= Yuka Nukui =

Japanese voice actress

- 貫井 柚佳
- Born: 30 December; Tokyo, Japan
- Occupation: Voice actress
- Years active: 2016–present
- Notable work: Airi Yamamoto in Back Street Girls; Nanao Hibiya in Reign of the Seven Spellblades; Anne Halford in Sugar Apple Fairy Tale

Yuka Nukui (貫井 柚佳, Nukui Yuka; born 30 December) is a Japanese voice actress from Tokyo, affiliated with Air Agency. She is known for voicing Airi Yamamoto in Back Street Girls, Noelle in Kizuna no Allele, Nanao Hibiya in Reign of the Seven Spellblades, Cy in Sacrificial Princess and the King of Beasts, and Anne Halford in Sugar Apple Fairy Tale.

== Biography ==
Nukui, a native of Tokyo, was born on 30 December. She was educated at the Japan Narration Acting Institute and Air Agency's Voice Actor Training Center. In 2016, she voiced Kana Terada in Aikatsu Stars!, Bishamonten in Monster Strike, Battle Leader Regen in Pokémon Ga-Olé, and Fumi Kasai in The Disastrous Life of Saiki K.. In 2017, she voiced Kasumi Fukumoto in 18if and Sanae Takahashi in Just Because!. The same year, she began voicing Meryl Tear in Is It Wrong to Try to Pick Up Girls in a Dungeon?, and later reprised the role in the video game adaptation Is It Wrong to Try to Pick Up Girls in a Dungeon?: Memoria Freese and the 2019 film adaptation Is It Wrong to Try to Pick Up Girls in a Dungeon?: Arrow of the Orion.

In May 2018, Nukui voiced Airi Yamamoto in Back Street Girls. The same year, she also voiced Astrea Anthem in Last Period, Maho Ogano in Slow Start, and Miho Sawatari in That Time I Got Reincarnated as a Slime. In June 2019, she was cast as Tarōmaru Seike in A Certain Scientific Accelerator, and she subsequently reprised the role in A Certain Scientific Railgun T and A Certain Magical Index: Imaginary Fest. In November 2019, she was cast as Ginny in Interspecies Reviewers. The same year, she also voiced Nia in Arifureta: From Commonplace to World's Strongest, Miss Kitty in Cannon Busters, Rushera in Do You Love Your Mom and Her Two-Hit Multi-Target Attacks?, Mirin Hinokuchi in Kaguya-sama: Love Is War, and Shikimi in Pokémon Masters EX.

In February 2020, Nukui was cast as Hana Shiraishi in Mewkledreamy. The same year, she voiced Igogusa-chan in Golden Kamuy. In 2021, she voiced Mikuri Cairo in 86, Anna Takayanagi in Amaim Warrior at the Borderline, and Serina in How a Realist Hero Rebuilt the Kingdom. In 2022, she voiced Lily Shirogane in Fuuto PI, Edward of Middleham in Requiem of the Rose King, and Ibara in RWBY: Ice Queendom. In March 2022, she was cast as Higuri in In the Heart of Kunoichi Tsubaki. In August 2022, she was cast as Cy in Sacrificial Princess and the King of Beasts and as Anne Halford in Sugar Apple Fairy Tale. In September 2022, she was cast as Mandara Samuragōchi in Shinobi no Ittoki. In December 2022, she was cast as Noelle in Kizuna no Allele. In March 2023, she was cast as Nanao Hibiya in Reign of the Seven Spellblades. In February 2024, she was cast as Magino in 2.5 Dimensional Seduction.

== Filmography ==
=== Television animation ===
2016

- Active Raid, narration
- Aikatsu Stars!, Kana Terada
- ClassicaLoid, mother
- Crayon Shin-chan, waitress, schoolgirl
- The Disastrous Life of Saiki K., Fumi Kasai, Akiko Murakami, others
- Mob Psycho 100, schoolgirl
- New Game!, Okada, catgirl, others

2017

- 18if, Kasumi Fukumoto, female student
- Alice & Zoroku, salesperson
- Children of the Whales, Honne, Kanae, Hasmulito
- Fire Force, schoolgirl, secretary
- Food Wars!: Shokugeki no Soma, female customer, female announcer, etc.
- Fuuka, schoolgirl
- Gamers!, schoolgirl, others
- Interviews with Monster Girls, schoolgirl
- Is It Wrong to Try to Pick Up Girls in a Dungeon?, Meryl Tear
- Just Because!, Sanae Takahashi
- Hina Logi: from Luck & Logic, announcer, staff, etc.
- Scum's Wish, girl

2018

- A Place Further than the Universe, schoolgirl, journalist
- Back Street Girls, Airi Yamamoto
- Bloom Into You, schoolgirl, female staff
- Cells at Work!, macrophage 1, macrophage 2, sweat gland cell 1, etc.
- Comic Girls, elementary school student, weather girl
- Dakaichi, female staff member
- The Girl in Twilight, Tomoya's fan
- Gundam Build Divers, reception
- Hi Score Girl, classmate, Kogal
- High School DxD Hero, girl, mother
- Last Period, Astrea Anthem, Celeas
- Merc Storia, Pipihina, Partisan
- Million Arthur, girl, swimsuit gal, etc.
- Ms. Vampire Who Lives in My Neighborhood, schoolgirl
- Rokuhōdō Yotsuiro Biyori, female customer
- Slow Start, Maho Ogano
- Takunomi, office lady, friend
- Teasing Master Takagi-san, elementary school student's sister
- That Time I Got Reincarnated as a Slime, Miho Sawatari

2019

- A Certain Magical Index III, daughter, girl
- A Certain Scientific Accelerator, Tarōmaru Seike
- Ahiru no Sora, young Katori, volleyball club member
- Aikatsu Friends!, citizen
- Arifureta: From Commonplace to World's Strongest, Nia
- Cautious Hero: The Hero Is Overpowered but Overly Cautious, goddess
- The Demon Girl Next Door, girl, Ochiai
- Do You Love Your Mom and Her Two-Hit Multi-Target Attacks?, Rushera
- Dr. Stone, student, reporter
- Ensemble Stars!, young Subaru Akehoshi
- Fairy Gone, refugee
- Fruits Basket, vice-chairman
- Is It Wrong to Try to Pick Up Girls in a Dungeon?, prostitute, Amazo prostitute
- Kaguya-sama: Love Is War, Mirin Hinokuchi, nurse
- Null & Peta, bug, classmate
- Revisions, schoolgirl, mother, etc.
- Stars Align, schoolgirl
- Symphogear XV, announcer
- We Never Learn, swimming club member

2020

- A Certain Scientific Railgun T, Tarōmaru Seike
- A3!, audience member
- Darwin's Game, Rein's friend
- Gleipnir, female collector
- Golden Kamuy, Igogusa-chan
- Interspecies Reviewers, Ginny
- Is the Order a Rabbit? BLOOM, Nacchan
- Lapis Re:Lights, couple, student
- Mewkledreamy, Hana Shiraishi, young Asahi Minamikawa, Gekun
- Somali and the Forest Spirit, elderly woman
- White Cat Project: Zero Chronicle, child, white mage

2021

- 86, Mikuri Cairo, reporter
- Amaim Warrior at the Borderline, Anna Takayanagi
- Blue Reflection Ray, student, moderator, etc.
- Cardfight!! Vanguard overDress, staff, spectators, etc.
- Higehiro, younger brother
- Horimiya, elementary school student
- How a Realist Hero Rebuilt the Kingdom, Serina
- Irina: The Vampire Cosmonaut, woman in the crowd
- Mieruko-chan, Nyansuke
- Mushoku Tensei, maid
- Skate-Leading Stars, women's tennis manager
- Suppose a Kid from the Last Dungeon Boonies Moved to a Starter Town, Part Rabbit
- Vivy: Fluorite Eye's Song, Employee AI, girl in wheelchair, etc.
- WIXOSS Diva(A)Live, classmate A, schoolgirl A

2022

- Detective Conan: Police Academy Arc, hostage
- The Devil Is a Part-Timer!, housewife
- Doraemon, girl
- The Executioner and Her Way of Life, girl in white
- Fuuto PI, Lily Shirogane
- Healer Girl, hospital people
- In the Heart of Kunoichi Tsubaki, Higuri
- JoJo's Bizarre Adventure: Stone Ocean, female prisoner A
- The Makanai: Cooking for the Maiko House, maiko, announcer
- Police in a Pod, citizen
- Requiem of the Rose King, Edward of Middleham
- RWBY: Ice Queendom, Ibara
- Shinobi no Ittoki, Mandara Samuragōchi
- Uncle from Another World, nurse

2023

- Kizuna no Allele, Noelle
- Reign of the Seven Spellblades, Nanao Hibiya
- Sacrificial Princess and the King of Beasts, Cy
- Sugar Apple Fairy Tale, Anne Halford

2024

- 2.5 Dimensional Seduction, Magino
- The Stories of Girls Who Couldn't Be Magicians, Mikana Fruity
- The Do-Over Damsel Conquers the Dragon Emperor, Sphere
- Murai in Love, Murai (young)

2025

- Can a Boy-Girl Friendship Survive?, Rion Enomoto
- Yano-kun's Ordinary Days, Kiyoko Yoshida

2026

- The Case Book of Arne, Lynn Reinweiss
- The Invisible Man and His Soon-to-Be Wife, Shizuka Yakou
- Agents of the Four Seasons: Dance of Spring, Hinagiku Kayō
- My Stepmother and Stepsisters Aren't Wicked, Arisa Kōnokura
- I'm Looking for Zombies, Sakura

=== Theatrical animation ===
2016

- Aikatsu Stars! the Movie, Terada

2017

- Haikara-San: Here Comes Miss Modern Part 1, schoolgirl

2019

- Blackfox, Gradsheim Public Relations Officer
- Her Blue Sky, Akane's colleague
- Is It Wrong to Try to Pick Up Girls in a Dungeon?: Arrow of the Orion, Meryl Tear

2021

- Sing a Bit of Harmony, rice cooker AI
- Words Bubble Up Like Soda Pop

=== Original net animation ===
2016

- Monster Strike, Bishamonten, Zephon's mother

2019

- Cannon Busters, Miss Kitty
- Gundam Build Divers Re:Rise, archery club member, panelist, etc.
- The Disastrous Life of Saiki K.: Reawakened, player, female student, etc.
- Zenonzard: The Animation, Laura

2021

- Tawawa on Monday 2, lingerie shop clerk, baby, etc.
- The Way of the Househusband, teacher

=== Video games ===
2016

- Pokémon Ga-Olé, Battle Leader Regen

2017

- Endride: X Fragments, Charcoal
- Tenka Hyakken: Zan, Dōtanuki Masakuni

2018

- 100% Orange Juice!: Saki
- Is It Wrong to Try to Pick Up Girls in a Dungeon?: Memoria Freese, Meryl Tear, Noel, Maria

2019

- Pokémon Masters EX, Shikimi

2020

- A Certain Magical Index: Imaginary Fest, Tarōmaru Seike
- Last Period, Astrea Anthem

2021

- Jack Jeanne, Onaka

2025

- The Hundred Line: Last Defense Academy, Zen'ta
- ToHeart, Kotone Himekawa
