= Tawawa on Monday =

Collection of illustrations by Kiseki Himura and its franchise

- Blu-ray box cover, featuring Ai

月曜日のたわわ (Getsuyōbi no Tawawa)
- Original net animation
- Directed by: Kōsuke Murayama (1–12); Yuki Ogawa (13–24)
- Produced by: Yūma Ōgami; Keisuke Fukunaga; Mitsutoshi Ogura (1–12); Kazuhiro Kanemitsu (1–12); Haruto Asai (13–24); Tatsunao Yanagawa (13–24)
- Written by: Kōsuke Murayama (1–12); Hajime Kamoshida (13–24)
- Music by: Yoshiaki Dewa
- Studio: Pine Jam (1–12); Cloud Hearts (13–24) (Note: With animation management and supervision (アニメーション統括) by Yokohama Animation Lab.)
- Licensed by: Crunchyroll: SA/SEA: Muse Communication
- Released: October 10, 2016 – December 6, 2021
- Runtime: 5 minutes
- Episodes: 24
- Original video animation
- Directed by: Kōsuke Murayama (1–2); Yuki Ogawa (3)
- Produced by: Yūma Ōgami; Keisuke Fukunaga; Mitsutoshi Ogura (1–2); Kazuhiro Kanemitsu (1–2); Haruto Asai (3); Tatsunao Yanagawa (3)
- Written by: Kōsuke Murayama (1–2); Hajime Kamoshida (3)
- Music by: Yoshiaki Dewa
- Studio: Pine Jam (1–2); Cloud Hearts (3)
- Released: December 29, 2016 – December 24, 2021
- Runtime: 5 minutes
- Episodes: 3
- Manga
- Written by: Kiseki Himura
- Published by: Kodansha
- English publisher: NA: Denpa
- Magazine: Weekly Young Magazine
- Original run: November 16, 2020 – present
- Volumes: 15
- icon

Tawawa on Monday (Japanese: 月曜日のたわわ, Hepburn: Getsuyōbi no Tawawa) is a collection of illustrations (most containing no dialogue) by Kiseki Himura. Himura has posted an illustration on his Twitter account every Monday starting from February 2015. An original net animation (ONA) adaptation by Pine Jam aired from October to December 2016. A second season by Cloud Hearts aired from September to December 2021. A manga adaptation began in Kodansha's Weekly Young Magazine in November 2020.

== Plot ==
The story revolves around an ample-breasted high school student named Ai who has a chance meeting with a salaryman on a train. They strike up a friendship and end up meeting every Monday on the train, where they chat. The salaryman serves as Ai's chaperone during the crowded commute, eventually starting a relationship with her. The series also focuses on other well-endowed female characters and their love interests.

== Concept ==
This project was initially called Getsuyō Asa no Shachiku Shokei ni Tawawa o Otodokeshimasu (月曜朝の社畜諸兄にたわわをお届けします; "I shall offer tawawa to our brothers in corporate slavery on Monday mornings") before Himura gave its current name after the 46th illustration, and has since posted more than 200 illustrations. These illustrations are colored in a blue monochrome theme. The initial purpose of these illustrations was to provide a positive motivation towards workers and students alike on Monday mornings, as the role of students and workers are reflected through the characters Ai and the salaryman, respectively. Besides Ai, the stories of other various girls and men are also illustrated every Monday. So far, the first volume illustration compilation book that also includes comic was released on December 31, 2015, at Comic Market 89. The second volume was released at Comic Market 90 and the third volume was released at Comic Market 91, all has been published by Himura himself.

== Characters ==
Ai (アイちゃん, Ai-chan)
Voiced by: Sayaka Harada
Ai is a high school student who, despite being slender, has big breasts. She used to suffer from low self-esteem as her breasts attract attention from men around her and has been trying to hide them. Because of her duty as the class president, she has to come to school earlier than everyone else every Monday, and has to ride the train during its rush hour. That is when she met the salaryman who shields her from the crowds every time they met and helped her gaining more confidence in her own body. Her nickname comes from the fact that her breast size is I cup. However, recently the size seems to be getting even bigger.
Salaryman (お兄さん, Onii-san; Older Brother)
Voiced by: Junji Majima
A salaryman who shields Ai from the crowded train every Monday morning. Every week, Ai gives him a weekly charm, which are mostly buttons popped off from her shirts. His niece is coincidentally Ai's best friend.
Junior (後輩ちゃん, Kōhai-chan)
Voiced by: Ai Kayano
A clumsy, but reliable office woman who works for a trading company. Junior often comes to Senior's house, since he is keeping a cat.
Senior (先輩, Senpai)
Voiced by: Yasuaki Takumi
Junior's senior at trading company. He takes care of Junior when she gets out of control with her alcohol. He is keeping a cat named "Fumi-chan".
Maegami (前髪ちゃん, Maegami-chan; Bangs)
Voiced by: Rie Takahashi
A freshman college girl who now lives with Teacher in his apartment after her feelings were finally reciprocated by him ever since her love confession on first year in high school. She refers to Teacher as Sensei when she calls him.
Maegami is not her real name. This nickname comes from her hairstyle, with the bangs covering her eyes.
Volley club member (バレー部ちゃん, Barē-bu-chan)
Voiced by: Shizuka Ishigami
Ai's best friend and Salaryman's niece. She is popular with both boys and girls, and she often teases Ai-chan about her breasts, but at the same time she is very protective of her.
Teacher (先生, Sensei)
Voiced by: Jun'ichi Yanagita
A male teacher who Maegami has liked since her first year of high school. He was having trouble accepting her love confession due to school regulations. He finally revealed his true feelings after she came back to him even after her graduation. He and Maegami are now living together, coincidentally next to Salary man's house and moving next to Ai-chan's house shortly after their wedding engagement.
Cheerleader (チアリーダーちゃん, Chiarīdā-chan)
Voiced by: Marika Kōno
A high school cheerleader who instantly becomes popular and becomes a model after she gets featured in media due to her body.
Baseball Club Member (野球部, Yakyū-bu)
Voiced by: Taito Ban
The childhood friend of Cheerleader who became conscious of her after he learned the differences between boys and girls.
Trainer (トレーナーさん, Torēnā-san)
Voiced by: Minami Tsuda
A gym trainer who occasionally accompanies Chief Manager at the gym.
Chief manager (課長, Kachō)
Voiced by: Kōichi Sōma
Salaryman's boss.
School Nurse (保健室の先生, Hoken-shitsu no Sensei)
Voiced by: Yō Taichi
Female employee (女性社員, Josei shain)
Voiced by: Lynn
Dental Hygienist (歯科衛生士さん, Shika eiseishi-san)
Voiced by: Mamiko Noto
Dental Assistant (歯科助手, Shika joshu)
Voiced by: Minami Shinoda
Male Dentist (男性歯科医師, Dansei shika ishi)
Voiced by: Ryūnosuke Watanuki
Ms. Tokumori (徳森さん, Tokumori-san)
Voiced by: Hisako Kanemoto
A worker at a minimarket.
Little Sister (妹ちゃん, Imōto-chan)
Voiced by: Yuka Iguchi
Ai-chan's younger sister who now studies at Ai-chan's high school as first year student. She also has a good figure like Ai-chan's.
Mother (お母さん, Okaa-san)
Voiced by: Kikuko Inoue
Mother to Ai-chan and her sister. She is always having trouble, due to having to fix the buttons that have popped off of Imōto-chan and Ai-chan's clothes due to their large breasts.
Rikei-chan (サイエンスちゃん, Science-chan)
Voiced by: Yukiyo Fujii
A graduate student and researcher at an unnamed university. She is a close friend of Kouhai-chan.
Sada-chan (貞ちゃん, Sada-chan)
Voiced by: TBA
A ghost streamer and former actress who is Ai-chan's neighbor.

== Media ==
=== Original net animation ===
A twelve episode original net animation (ONA), each episode of four minutes in length, aired from October 10 to December 26, 2016, and were streamed online for free on NBCUniversal Entertainment Japan's official YouTube account for episode 1 and Niconico channel for episode 2 onwards every Monday, following the routine of the original illustrations. Kōsuke Murayama directed the anime, Hiroyuki Yoshii adapted Kiseki Himura's original designs, and Pine Jam produced the series. Sayaka Harada sung the ending theme song titled Otome no Tawawa (乙女のたわわ) under her character name and is digitally released via iTunes Store, Amazon, Oricon Music Store, mora, and Recochoku starting November 14, 2016. Muse Communication licensed the series in Asia-Pacific.

A Blu-ray and DVD, compiling all 12 episodes, were released at Comic Market 91 (December 29–31, 2016) at NBCUniversal's booth. The DVD includes two new special episodes, with each episode focusing on Junior and Ai.

A second season was announced on September 20, 2021. It premiered on the same day and ended on December 6, 2021. Yuki Ogawa is directing the anime, with Hajime Kamoshida writing the scripts, and Tensho Sato adapting Himura's original designs. Cloud Hearts is producing the second season. Crunchyroll licensed the series outside of Asia.

==== Takedown ====
A day after NBCUniversal Entertainment Japan posted the first episode, the video was taken down by YouTube, stating that the video violates its Community Guidelines. The author Kiseki Himura apologized to fans on Twitter and that said that the anime will not be reuploaded on YouTube. Two days later, he announced via his Twitter account that the first episode has been restored and uploaded via the same channel, now under the YouTube account NBCUniversal Anime/Music. Starting from episode 2, the anime was uploaded via Niconico Channel along with the reuploaded first episode.

==== Episodes ====
===== Season 1 =====
No. overall	No. in season	Title (Note: Japanese Title: Taken from the episode's title card)	Original release date
1	1	"Tawawa on Monday" "Getsuyōbi no Tawawa" (月曜日のたわわ)	October 10, 2016 (Note: October 10, 2016 (original) October 13, 2016 (reuploaded) October 17, 2016 (Niconico Channel))
When a salaryman is returning to work on a Monday after his holidays, a buxom high school girl named Ai bumps into him and knocks him over causing him to be taken to hospital. She asks him to act as a type of bodyguard to protect her from the other passengers aboard the crowded train and so their friendship begins.
2	2	"A Junior Who Thinks She's Got Her Act Together but Shows More Than She Intends To" "Shikkarimono no Tsumori da ga Suki no Ōi Kōhai" (しっかり者のつもりだがスキの多い後輩)	October 17, 2016
One Monday morning, a Junior office woman offers to assist her senior, the Salaryman who is struggling to meet his deadline, and they end up working until dawn.
3	3	"Tawawa Sports"	October 24, 2016
One day, Salaryman is scolded by his Manager for not satisfying his quota. He sees a pamphlet for the Tawawa Sports gym and thinks about visiting it. Meanwhile his manager visits the gym on the weekend and after being given a tour, he joins up. On the following Monday, Salaryman's manager advises him that "result isn't everything, the progress is" and suggests that he join a gym.
4	4	"The Angel of Blue Mondays" "Burūmandē no Tenshi" (ブルーマンデーの天使)	October 31, 2016
One Monday morning while Ai gives the salaryman another button, this time off her part-time job uniform, he thinks about her neat appearance and her popularity.
5	5	"Ai-chan and the Deadly Battle of Measurements" "Ai-chan to Kessen no Shintai Sokutei" (アイちゃんと決戦の身体測定)	November 8, 2016
One Monday morning, Ai tells Salaryman that she skipped breakfast because she is due for a regular medical check up at her school. She is concerned that her large breasts make her comparatively heavy for her height.
6	6	"A Junior Who Thinks She's Really Careful, but Isn't at All" "Mimochi no Katai Tsumori da ga Guard no Yurui Kōhai" (身持ちの堅いつもりだがガードの緩い後輩)	November 14, 2016
A female employee asks if Junior wants to go on a blind double date. She is reluctant and after she mentions her long distance boyfriend, Senior saves her by saying they have to work. One evening, after a work related drinking party, Senior carries the drunk Junior back to her apartment home on his back and she reveals that she actually has no boyfriend but uses it as an excuse to avoid unwanted romantic advances from men.
7	7	"Ai-chan and Summer Memories" "Ai-chan to Hitonatsu no Omoide" (アイちゃんと一夏の思い出)	November 21, 2016
One Monday morning in Summer, Ai tells Salaryman that she's going to spend her summer vacation with her cool and popular best friend. Salaryman complains that unlike students, workers barely get a day off, but when Ai send him a photo of herself in a new swimsuit saying that her scheduled trip with her friends isn't taking place due to a storm and asks him to take her to the sea over the weekend instead. He decides to take the weekend off from work.
8	8	"A Painkiller That's Sure to Work" "Zettai ni Yokukiku Chintsū-zai" (絶対によく効く鎮痛剤)	November 28, 2016
One Monday morning, Ai notices that Salaryman has a toothache and advises him to go to the dentist. His appointment follows his manager, who praises the painkiller the dentist used.
9	9	"Ai-chan and the Bakery Uniform" "Ai-chan to Pan-ya no Seifuku" (アイちゃんとパン屋の制服)	December 5, 2016
One morning, Salaryman visits Ai-chan at the bakery café where she works part-time job as a waitress. Although quite businesslike while on duty, AI arranges to meet him after work and gives him her waitress uniform with some missing buttons.
10	10	"Ai-chan vs. the Marathon" "Ai-chan to Maraton no Tatakai" (アイちゃんとマラトンの戦い)	December 12, 2016
Ai is having trouble running in the school's marathon and is intrigued why her friend in the volleyball club, who also has fairly large breasts, seems to be not bothered. Her friend then grabs and supports Ai's breasts making the running easier.
11	11	"A Game Where You Look Back With Regret, Imagining What Life Would Be Like With the Girl You Missed Out on in Her Late Teens" "Marumaru Minogashita Kanojo no Haitīn Jidai o Kōkai to Tomoni Sōzō suru Asobi" (丸々見逃した彼女のハイティーン時代を後悔と共に想像する遊び)	December 19, 2016
A young man attends his junior high school reunion and meets a girl who he missed his 'chance' with back in their student days. She has now blossomed into a buxom woman.
12	12	"Ai-chan and the Stairs to Adulthood" "Ai-chan to Otona no Kaidan" (アイちゃんと大人の階段)	December 26, 2016
One Monday morning on the train, Salaryman asked what Ai did during the Christmas Day, but she initially refuses to answer. Later, she reveals that she 'has taken a step into adulthood', moving from 'I-chan' to 'J-chan'. (Note: Reference to the fact that she's called "Ai" due to her bra size)
13 (OVA)	13	"The Careless but Loveable and Cute Junior" "Ukkari-mono da ga Aisare Jōzu no Kawaii Kōhai" (うっかり者だが愛され上手の可愛い後輩)	December 29, 2016
One Monday morning, Junior is running late and forgets to zip up her skirt. When she arrives at work, Senior is the first to tell her. She exclaims she can't marry anymore and shocks him when she says that he must to take "responsibility" if nobody wants to marry her.
14 (OVA)	14	"Ai and Private Film" "Ai-chan to Puraibēto Firumu" (アイちゃんとプライベートフィルム)	December 29, 2016
While cleaning Salaryman's room, Ai finds an adult video which in the actress wears the same uniform she has in her part time job. Upset, Ai accidentally breaks one of his DVD's. Later, Ai tries to apologize by wearing her part time job uniform for Salaryman, but the buttons give way, revealing more than she intended.

===== Season 2 =====
No. overall	No. in season	Title (Note: English Title: Literal translation) (Note: Japanese Title: Taken from the episode's title card)	Original release date
15	1	"Part 1" "Sono ichi" (その1)	September 20, 2021
In the new school semester, Ai-chan gives two buttons to Salaryman while on train rather than the usual one. Ai explains that her sister will be joining her at school, but Ai maintains a physical advantage in the bust area. During lunch break, Ai-chan's sister questions her that why she still leaves home early to catch the morning train when it is no longer necessary. In an epilogue, as Salaryman leaves for work, he is embarrassed to see his neighbor, Teacher, being kissed goodbye by Maegami-chan.
16	2	"Part 2" "Sono ni" (その2)	September 27, 2021
Third year high school girl, Maegami-chan, has had a crush on Teacher since her first year at high school, but he has resisted her advances for the past three years. The night before April Fools which is after her graduation from high school, she goes to his apartment and urges him to reveal his true feelings for her as they no longer have a student-teacher relationship. He tells her, but then she reveals that there is one more day to go. Unable to hold back his desire, he drags her into his apartment, much to her surprise and joy.
17	3	"Part 3" "Sono san" (その3)	October 4, 2021
Senpai and Kouhai go on a company trip together to Kyushu. After a successful presentation, Senpai goes to Kouhai's room to invite her out for a drink, however, he is hugely embarrassed when Kouhai answers the door in a bath towel and he hastily leaves. The next morning while Senpai is buying a gifts for his colleagues back home, Kouhai adds a bottle wine to the purchase, suggesting that they could drink it at Senpai's house when they return.
18	4	"Part 4" "Sono yon" (その4)	October 11, 2021
Maegami-chan convinces Teacher to go to the beach with her after she shows him her new swimsuit which is sure to attract the attention of other men. Meanwhile, one day after work, Salaryman sees Maegami-chan enthusiastically welcoming Teacher when he's back from work and wishes he could also have a passionate relationship with Ai-chan, but he quickly dismisses the thought. Not long afterwards, Salaryman is cheered when Ai-chan texts an invitation to go to Tawawa Farm with her in an upcoming holiday break.
19	5	"Part 5" "Sono go" (その5)	October 18, 2021
Salaryman goes on a holiday break with Ai-chan and during the trip, Ai-chan notices that Salaryman has not been sleeping well. He explains that his passionate neighbors are keeping him awake. Salaryman and Ai-chan have a good time out, but Salaryman is distracted by the number of large breasted girls he sees during the day. On the way home, Ai-chan asks Salaryman what he would do if she stopped at his place, making him feel awkward.
20	6	"Part 6" "Sono roku" (その6)	October 25, 2021
One day on the train, Ai-chan notices Salaryman is looking more rested, and he explains that the man next door is ill, so things were much quieter. One night at Senpai's apartment, Kouhai mentions to Senpai that she saw a man buying an engagement ring before she passes out after drinking too much. Meanwhile, Teacher proposes to Maegami-chan, making her happy but frustrated that she did not record the event on her phone. Later, Ai-chan and her sister discover that a young couple have moved in next door, not realizing that they are Teacher and Maegami-chan who were Salaryman's previous neighbors.
21	7	"Part 7" "Sono nana" (その7)	November 1, 2021
One morning, Ai's Mother finds a bra hanging over their balcony and questions Ai-chan and her sister about it. They suspect that it may belong to their new neighbor Maegami-chan. Ai and her sister return the bra to Maegami-chan who tells them about her and Teacher's relationship since high school and how they are not yet married because it may create a scandal. The discussion about relationships causes Ai-chan and her sister to fantasize about having their own romantic interludes.
22	8	"Part 8" "Sono hachi" (その8)	November 8, 2021
During lunch at ramen shop, Senpai and Kouhai see a live TV program showing high school cheerleaders and Senpai warns Kouhai not to be captured on camera from weird angles. Kouhai also reminds him to delete the photo she sent him wearing a school uniform. Meanwhile, a red haired Cheerleader-chan who is popular at high school teases her childhood friend Baldy. One day, Baldy and his friends are inside the convenience store and they see a magazine with the Cheerleader-chan on cover page. Cheerleader-chan who passes by signals them through the store's glass to buy the magazine. At their workplace, Senpai sees an online article with a photo of a woman at a cosplay event and he thinks she looks somewhat familiar. As Kouhai passes by his desk, she recognizes herself in the photo causing her to stumble and fall.
23	9	"Part 9" "Sono kyū" (その9)	November 15, 2021
On a company trip to a hot spring, Kouhai challenges Senpai to a game of Ping Pong but he loses after being distracted by her constantly moving breasts. Late that night, Senpai decides to take a dip in the hot spring and finds that Kouhai has the same idea. They chat for a while over the dividing screen and Kouhai says they should get together later. However, Kouhai drinks too much beer while in a massage chair and Senpai has to carry her to her room. On the way home in the bus, Kouhai loudly says they should get together again in a hot spring, but her meaning is misinterpreted by their colleagues.
24	10	"Part 10" "Sono juu" (その10)	November 22, 2021
One day on the train, Ai-chan shows Salaryman a short news video of her appearing on the cheerleading team and she asks how he would react if she was scouted by model agency. He is noncommittal, but says he would like to see any pictures first, so Ai-chan shows him a cute cosplay of her which captures his interest. Meanwhile, Cheerleader-chan wears a bikini to help Baldy relax after his baseball practice. She then asks if she can copy his homework as her modelling work reduces her study time, but he refuses. When she then offers to change into another swimsuit in front of him, he relents and gives her his homework. She copies it while still wearing her bikini, and then she asks him to help her practice her ball throwing. Some days later, Cheerleader-chan is invited to throw the opening pitch at a local baseball game and after throwing a strike, a photo of her appears in a magazine in which she credits her childhood friend for helping her practice, much to Baldy's embarrassment.
25	11	"Part 11" "Sono Jū ichi" (その11)	November 29, 2021
One day at school, Ai-chan has trouble wiping the blackboard, so Barebu-chan lifts her up but the sudden movement breaks Ai-chan's bra. She decides to buy a new one and Barebu-chan accompanies her, but because Ai-chan's breast size is increasing she must pay a premium, depleting the month's earnings from her part-time job. They met Maegami-chan inside the shop while she is being measured for made-to-order wedding undergarments. Maegami-chan tells them about the wedding ceremony that Teacher promised her and invites them to attend. When Ai-chan arrives home, her family celebrates her reaching a one metre breast size, but Ai-chan is concerned that her large breast size will become a problem in the future.
26	12	"Part 12" "Sono Jū ni" (その12)	December 6, 2021
On Maegami-chan and Teacher's wedding day, Ai-chan's sister has to help zip up her blouse because of her increasing bust size. The wedding ceremony goes smoothly and Ai-chan catches the bridal flower bouquet. Meanwhile, Cheerleader-chan is envious when she sees the bridal party during a photo shoot. Kouhai feels envious too while passing by but Senpai tries to discourage her from thoughts of marriage. While holding a baby, Maegami-chan hints at having children with Teacher, but he laughs nervously. Kouhai stops with Senpai to look at wedding dresses, but that makes him nervous. The following Monday Ai-chan meets Salaryman at train station and suggests that they both try their best this week.
27 (OVA)	13	"Part 13" "Sono Jū san" (その13)	
Ai-chan goes to the beach with her family, while Kouhai cannot find a swimsuit her friend approves of and Maegami-chan sleeps in with Sensei.

=== Manga adaptation ===
A manga adaptation began in Kodansha's seinen manga magazine Weekly Young Magazine on November 16, 2020. The manga is released in two versions: the standard edition and the blue monochrome edition that stays true to the original style of the series. Kodansha released its first collected tankōbon volume on April 5, 2021. As of July 6, 2026, fifteen volumes have been released. During their Otakon 2022 panel, Denpa announced their license to the manga.

==== Volumes ====
No.	Original release date	Original ISBN	English release date	English ISBN
1	April 5, 2021	978-4-06-522434-2; 978-4-06-523281-1 (SE)	March 23, 2027	978-1-63-442842-2
2	August 2, 2021	978-4-06-524347-3; 978-4-06-524348-0 (SE)	—	—
3	December 6, 2021	978-4-06-526175-0; 978-4-06-526176-7 (SE)	—	—
4	April 4, 2022	978-4-06-527472-9; 978-4-06-527473-6 (SE)	—	—
5	August 1, 2022	978-4-06-528793-4; 978-4-06-528792-7 (SE)	—	—
6	December 5, 2022	978-4-06-530062-6; 978-4-06-530061-9 (SE)	—	—
7	May 8, 2023	978-4-06-531691-7; 978-4-06-531695-5 (SE)	—	—
8	August 7, 2023	978-4-06-532658-9; 978-4-06-532655-8 (SE)	—	—
9	December 4, 2023	978-4-06-533945-9; 978-4-06-533943-5 (SE)	—	—
10	May 7, 2024	978-4-06-535588-6; 978-4-06-535590-9 (SE)	—	—
11	September 2, 2024	978-4-06-536915-9; 978-4-06-536914-2 (SE)	—	—
12	February 3, 2025	978-4-06-538575-3; 978-4-06-538576-0 (SE)	—	—
13	June 30, 2025	978-4-06-540138-5; 978-4-06-540259-7 (SE)	—	—
14	January 5, 2026	978-4-06-541724-9; 978-4-06-541725-6 (SE)	—	—
15	July 6, 2026	978-4-06-544229-6; 978-4-06-544243-2 (SE)	—	—

== See also ==
- Just Because!, original animation collaboration between Kiseki Himura and The Pet Girl of Sakurasou's author Hajime Kamoshida
