= 'Tis Time for "Torture," Princess =

Japanese manga series

- First volume cover

姫様"拷問"の時間です (Hime-sama "Gōmon" no Jikan desu)
- Genre: Fantasy comedy
- Manga
- Written by: Robinson Haruhara
- Illustrated by: Hirakei
- Published by: Shueisha
- Imprint: Jump Comics+
- Magazine: Shōnen Jump+
- Original run: April 4, 2019 – August 19, 2025
- Volumes: 19
- Anime television series
- Directed by: Yōko Kanemori
- Written by: Kazuyuki Fudeyasu
- Music by: Masaru Yokoyama
- Studio: Pine Jam
- Licensed by: Crunchyroll; SA/SEA: Medialink
- Original network: Tokyo MX, BS11, Kansai TV, AT-X, TVh (S1 & 2); NBC (S1)
- Original run: January 9, 2024 – March 30, 2026
- Episodes: 24
- icon

'Tis Time for "Torture," Princess (Japanese: 姫様"拷問"の時間です, Hepburn: Hime-sama "Gōmon" no Jikan desu) is a Japanese manga series written by Robinson Haruhara and illustrated by Hirakei. It was serialized on the Shōnen Jump+ manga website from April 2019 to August 2025. It has been published in nineteen tankōbon volumes as of January 2026. An anime television series adaptation produced by Pine Jam aired from January to March 2024. A second season aired from January to March 2026.

== Premise ==
In an ongoing battle between the humanity's Imperial Army and the demonic Hell-hordes, the princess from the army has been captured along with her holy sword Ex. Since regular torture is prohibited by the prisoner of war treaty between the two parties, the grand inquisitor, Torture Tortura, employs unusual "torture" (in air quotes) techniques, usually in the form of tempting foods and snacks from Japanese culture. The princess relents, but gives information that is usually trivial in nature, and the few times she does give useful information, the Hell-Lord does not take advantage of it.

== Characters ==
=== Main characters ===
Princess (姫様, Hime-sama)
Voiced by: Haruka Shiraishi
The commander of the Third Order of the Imperial Army, and the princess of the Human World's kingdom. She is a formidable fighter but a food lover, thus is highly susceptible to the "torture" tactics employed by Tortura.
Excalibur (エクスカリバー, Ekusukaribā)
Voiced by: Chikahiro Kobayashi
Nicknamed "Ex", is the legendary holy sword that belongs to the Princess, who acts as a straight man. He often tries to advise the Princess not to submit to the Hellhorde's tortures to avoid her from sharing the imperial secrets, but just as often his attempts fails as Princess ends up giving in anyway.
Torture Tortura (トーチャー・トルチュール, Tōchā Toruchūru)
Voiced by: Shizuka Itō
The Hellhorde's Grand Inquisitor (the highest-ranking chief interrogator), and the Princess' main torturer. She specializes in food type "torture", utilizing the appetizing, irresistible aspects of foods and snacks to entice her interrogation target into spilling their secrets.

=== Torturers ===
Datama (ダターマ, Datāma)
The primary assistant of Torture Tortura who is depicted with a hand-painted star on his face and an intimidating stature. He usually helps with the cooking and presentation aspects of her food-based "torture".
Youki (陽鬼, Yōki) and Inki (陰鬼, Inki)
Voiced by: Anna Nagase (Youki), Honoka Inoue (Inki)
Two-horned Youki and one-horned Inki are the Oni sisters (actually cousins) that hold the rank of "Lieutorments" (the intermediate-level torturers). They are good in friendship-bonding activity "torture", and seems to be genuinely interested in making friends with the Princess.
Krall (クロル, Kuroru)
Voiced by: Aya Yamane
Top combatant and senior torturer, Beast Tamer Krall specializes in zoo-type "torture", employing many ferocious beasts and cute animals in her possession as her interrogation methods.
Giant (ジャイアント, Jaianto)
Voiced by: Ai Kayano
A gentle giantess, who the Princess calls "Master Mama". She seems more interested in relaxing activities and moderate leisure rather than tortures.
Mao-Mao (マオマオちゃん, Maomao-chan)
Voiced by: Rina Hidaka
The Hell-Lord's cute and pure preschool-aged daughter, who employs innocent and childish "torture" methods to tempt the Princess into sharing her secrets. Due to her young age, her "torture" is never effective enough to actually break the Princess into talking; however, Mao-Mao's sheer cuteness makes the Princess unable to resist revealing secrets to her anyway.
Gilga (ギルガ, Giruga)
Voiced by: Sayaka Senbongi
The Hell-hordes' weaponsmith, and Tortura's close friend. Although she's not an official torturer, she does help in a few of the Princess' torture sessions.
Vanilla Peschutz (バニラ・ペシュッツ, Banira Peshuttsu)
Voiced by: Miyu Tomita
A prideful yet immature young vampire of the Hellholm's noble clan "Peschutz". She holds the rank of the "Harm-Marshal" (the advanced-level torturers), but she is still inexperienced in tortures. Despite her repeated failures, she is able to bond with the Princess.
Sakura Heartrock (サクラ・ハートロック, Sakura Hātorokku)
Voiced by: Mutsumi Tamura

=== Hell-Hordes ===
Hell-Lord (魔王, Maō)
Voiced by: Tesshō Genda
The king of the Hell-hordes. A demon conqueror who wishes to subjugate the human world, he employs various torturers to interrogate the Princess and gain secrets of the Human World's kingdom for his army's invasion. However, oftentimes he ended up not using it due to his selfish excuses. He is also a family man, and he enjoys Japanese culture as well.
Lulune (ルルン, Rurun)
Voiced by: Mai Nakahara
The Hell-Lord's wife, and the queen of the Hell-Hordes. Even though she holds the position of the queen in the Hellholm, she lives a modest life alongside the Hell-Lord and her daughter, Maomao. She is mature, smart and beautiful.
Canadge (カナッジ, Kanajji)
Voiced by: Jun Fukushima
A dwarf humanoid pig who acts as the Hell-Lord's assistant.

=== Humans ===
Louch Brittan (ルーシュ・ブリタン, Rūshu Buritan)
A Holy White Knight employed by the imperial army to save Princess from the Hellhorde's captivity, he is a powerful combatant but is quite unattractive.
Jimochi (ジモチ)
Voiced by: Hōchū Ōtsuka
The imperial's honored former knight turned Princess' imperial butler who always appeared in her flashbacks. He was a strict supervisor of the Princess' training regimens, but he secretly treated her with the commoner's cheap snacks and Chinese restaurant foods after her trainings.

== Media ==
=== Manga ===
Written by Robinson Haruhara and illustrated by Hirakei, 'Tis Time for "Torture," Princess was serialized on the Shōnen Jump+ manga website from April 4, 2019, to August 19, 2025. The first tankōbon volume was released on September 4, 2019. As of January 2026, nineteen volumes have been released.

In October 2019, Manga Plus announced they would start publishing the series on their app and website.

==== Volumes ====
No.	Japanese release date	Japanese ISBN
1	September 4, 2019	978-4-08-882045-3
2	February 4, 2020	978-4-08-882221-1
3	August 4, 2020	978-4-08-882398-0
4	November 4, 2020	978-4-08-882524-3
5	January 4, 2021	978-4-08-882535-9
6	July 2, 2021	978-4-08-882719-3
7	September 3, 2021	978-4-08-882765-0
8	January 4, 2022	978-4-08-882886-2
9	May 2, 2022	978-4-08-883122-0
10	October 4, 2022	978-4-08-883277-7
11	March 3, 2023	978-4-08-883444-3
12	July 4, 2023	978-4-08-883622-5
13	January 4, 2024	978-4-08-883843-4
14	March 4, 2024	978-4-08-883869-4
15	May 2, 2024	978-4-08-884067-3
16	October 4, 2024	978-4-08-884283-7
17	May 2, 2025	978-4-08-884550-0
18	November 4, 2025	978-4-08-884716-0
19	January 5, 2026	978-4-08-884801-3

=== Anime ===
An anime television series adaptation was announced on June 27, 2023. It is produced by Pine Jam and directed by Yōko Kanemori, with scripts written by Kazuyuki Fudeyasu, character designs handled by Toshiya Kōno and Satoshi Furuhashi, and music composed by Masaru Yokoyama. The series aired from January 9 to March 26, 2024, on Tokyo MX and other networks. (Note: Tokyo MX and BS11 listed the series premiere on January 8 at 24:00, which is effectively January 9 at midnight JST.) The opening theme song is "Massakasa Magic!" (まっさかさマジック！), performed by Shallm, while the ending theme song is "Ashita wa Ashita no Kaze ga Fuku" (明日は明日の風が吹く) performed by Leevelles. Crunchyroll streamed the series outside of East Asia. Medialink licensed the series in South and Southeast Asia for streaming on Ani-One Asia's YouTube channel.

After the airing of the final episode, a second season was announced, which premiered on January 12, 2026. The opening theme song is "Sunday Morning", performed by Illit, while the ending theme song is "Ohime-sama ni wa Narenai" (お姫様にはなれない; 'I Can't Become a Princess'), performed by Yuika.

==== Episodes ====
===== Season 1 (2024) =====
No. overall	No. in season	Title	Directed by (Note: Production staff information is taken from the ending credits of each episode.)	Written by	Storyboarded by	Original release date
1	1	"Episode 1"	Yōko Kanamori	Kazuyuki Fudeyasu	Yōko Kanamori	January 9, 2024
Princess, and her intelligent weapon Excalibur (Ex) are captured and imprisoned together in a cell. Tortura and Damura goad the princess with freshly-baked toast. Ex proudly goes on a lengthy diatribe about how she would never confess. After some dawdling, the princess confesses, and receives the toast. The gag is then repeated with takoyaki and ramen.
2	2	"Episode 2"	Kenji Takahashi	Momoko Murakami	Kenji Takahashi	January 16, 2024
Youki and Inki play a game reminiscent of Super Smash Bros. inside of Princess's cell, in full view of where she is sitting. She is handed a controller, then confesses. Krall withholds a ball from a baby polar bear, but returns the bear's ball out of guilt. Giant "tortures" Princess by taking her to a hot spring, and Tortura eats cookies with animal prints without looking at them, all causing Princess to confess.
3	3	"Episode 3"	Ryō Takei	Konomi Shugo	Kazuhiro Yoneda	January 23, 2024
Youki and Inki invite Princess along to go to a theme park. At first reluctant, Tortura allows her to go, in exchange for a secret. The Hell-Lord's daughter, Mao-Mao, attempts to entice her using bubble wrap, but accidentally expends it all, Tortura shows her the proper way to eat xiaolongbao, both causing Princess to confess. The white knight Louch Brittan breaks in and attempts to teleport her and him to safety. She breaks off due to his unattractive appearance, and he accidentally teleports off without her.
4	4	"Episode 4"	Tetsuya Wakano	Kazuyuki Fudeyasu	Tetsuya Wakano	January 30, 2024
The Hell-Lord has Tortura "torture" him to prove that she's still capable, due to not getting "useful" information. She shows him the "proper way" to pour a canned beer into a glass, causing him to confess in exchange for the freshly-poured beer. Ex is given a sanding and a coarse sharpening while screaming out in pleasure the whole time. In exchange for a full finish, Ex confesses. Krall temps the princess using the "soft" paw pads of a tame giant wolf. At first the princess complains that it stinks like an animal. After Krall confesses a secret to princess, she tries it again, and likes it. Mao-Mao plays in a playground, both causing princess to confess so she can play with her.
5	5	"Episode 5"	Komawo Yukihiro	Momoko Murakami	Yume Miho	February 6, 2024
Tortura takes Princess by a river and entices her with toasted marshmallows. She confesses, and plays in the river. Tortura is ordered to "torture" her for a second time in the same day. The princess, taking pity, confesses a secret to her "in passing". Youki and Inki are invited over, and they along with Tortura, Datama, Ex, and Princess play in the river together. Giant brings her to a spa after. Youki sets up a haunted house, but cannot be there due to illness. The princess confesses to end the "torture", so she can visit her.
6	6	"Episode 6"	Yoshiyuki Asai	Konomi Shugo	Yoshiyuki Asai	February 13, 2024
The Hell-Lord promotes his daughter for her performance, and as a reward, he plays games with her. Princess realizes the nature of the "torture" so far, before Tortura walks in with a smoldering hot iron. After some suspense, she uses to melt raclette cheese onto meat. Tortura enters to draw some blood for a medical checkup, the princess, being afraid of needles, receives an anesthetic patch in exchange for a secret. Louch Brittan returns to rescue her, however, this time he begins teleporting their clothes first, causing the princess to again, break off, and he teleports off without her, again.
7	7	"Episode 7"	Kazuhiro Yoneda	Kazuyuki Fudeyasu	Kazuhiro Yoneda	February 20, 2024
Krall "tortures" the princess by placing a sleeping cat on the Princess's lap, and her legs fall asleep. She confesses to have the cat removed, without awakening the cat. The princess gets invited to watch the school Mao-Mao's attends field day, and sits outside the field alongside Tortura, Datama, Youki, Inki and Ex. The Hell-Lord participates in some of the games with Mao-Mao, along with her mother. Princess cannot believe that the threatening figure playing with Mao-Mao is the Hell-Lord, who she knows as the greatest enemy of humanity. After the Hell-Lord delivers the closing speech, the princess begins returning back with everyone else.
8	8	"Episode 8"	Ryō Takei	Momoko Murakami	Yōko Kanamori	February 27, 2024
The episode begins with a flashback to Youki and Inki in high school talking about careers. Inki decides she wants to make people happy, and Youki decides she wants to continue being friends with Inki, so the two become torturers. It then cuts back to the present day where the two attempt to "torture" the king as a promotion requirement using a dance game. They fail the first time, then on the advice of Princess "torture" the king again adding Mao-Mao to the dance game, and all three get promotions. Giant and Princess walk back from the onsen, walk to the store to get snacks and talk about the stars. A new torturer, Vanilla Peschutz, "tortures" princess with a roller coast ride, but winds up confessing instead.
9	9	"Episode 9"	Komawo Yukihiro	Momoko Murakami	Kotomi Deari	March 5, 2024
Tortura goes on a business trip and eats microwave foods and buffet food. Mao-Mao, Lulune and the Hell-Lord make cookies together. Lulune almost drops the tray while removing it from the oven, but the Hell-Lord catches tray with the cookies on it, injuring his hand, with his soldiers terrified of who the culprit could be. Tortura gives Princess some cookies from Mao-Mao, and tortures the princess with freshly brewed black tea. The princess confesses, and Tortura and Princess enjoy tea and cookies together. Vanilla Peschutz tortures princess with a cake she made from scratch, with her limited cooking experience, and winds up gifting her the cake. The Hell-Lord attends his daughter's parent child luncheon at her school.
10	10	"Episode 10"	Yoshiyuki Asai	Konomi Shugo	Yoshiyuki Asai	March 12, 2024
Princess fights Youki and Inki on the beach with toy swords to pop the balloons on their heads, in exchange for any request on victory or divulging a secret on defeat. Inki is eliminated, and just before Youki is eliminated, Tortura brings in the rest of the cast to prevent her from "unexpectedly" winning, which she does anyway. Louch Brittan is caught outside the castle by the Hell-Lord while returning from an idol release event. The Brittan attacks the Hell-Lord who is unfazed, falls off a cliff, is saved, and the two talk about anime. Vanilla Peschutz wants to play cards, so she decides to "torture" princess with the temptation of playing cards. Princess picks up on this, tells her she wants friends too as her "secret", and the two play cards together.
11	11	"Episode 11"	Kenji Takahashi	Kazuyuki Fudeyasu	Kenji Takahashi	March 19, 2024
Krall "tortures" princess with a small dog, who Princess plays catch with and gives belly rubs to, causing her to draw a map of the secret passageways in the empire. However, the Hell-Horde's expert infiltrator who would make use of the maps resigns to become a children's author, with the Hell-Lord's blessing and encouragement. Princess is in a lucid dream and confesses in her dream to eat the foods, thinking it will not matter because it is a dream. However, Tortura is standing over her while she's confessing, and hears all the secrets. A spell backfires in a lab that turns everyone but the princess into children, and Tortura uses Mao-Mao style torture on her. Ex realizes it's a chance to escape, but the cast comes into play with princess, and she accepts. The spell starts wearing off on Tortura, though not yet back to her normal self yet, who tortures princess with beef stew, though with the spell's effect she lost some of her cooking skills as well. Princess encourages her, tries it, and confesses. The spell is now fully worn off on Tortura, and "tortures" the princess by letting her order a pizza with different toppings on each quarter.
12	12	"Episode 12"	Yōko Kanamori	Kazuyuki Fudeyasu	Yoshiyuki Asai	March 26, 2024
Vanilla Peschutz reminisces on how the Princess is her first friend and wants to do something with her. Princess watches a video of her and Jimochi and her ice skating on her phone. Vanilla sees this and invites her to a skating rink. Princess mistakes this as torture, but later realizes it isn't, and teaches Vanilla how to skate. The princess catches a cold. Tortura calls off torture, and gives princess a futon, udon, pudding and a TV. Tortura tells Princess there's going to be position shuffles in the Hell-Horde, so the Princess indirectly asks her to call in everyone else before they're possibly swapped out, although everyone remains together. Princess and the Hell-Lord are teleported to an alternate world after being hit by lightning during a basketball game, and the Hell-Lord explains how he saved the parallel world in the two hours while Princess was still asleep.

===== Season 2 (2026) =====
No. overall	No. in season	Title	Directed by	Written by	Storyboarded by	Original release date
13	1	"Episode 13"	Yōko Kanamori	Keiichiro Ochi	Yōko Kanamori	January 12, 2026
14	2	"Episode 14"	Fuji Morita	Keiichiro Ochi	Fuji Morita	January 19, 2026
15	3	"Episode 15"	Hitomi Ezoe	Takamitsu Kohno	Hitomi Ezoe	January 26, 2026
16	4	"Episode 16"	Maria Shimazaki	Takayo Ikami	Kazuhiro Furuhashi & Yuzo Sato	February 2, 2026
17	5	"Episode 17"	Komawo Yukihiro & Hitomi Ezoe	Keiichiro Ochi	Komawo Yukihiro & Hitomi Ezoe	February 9, 2026
18	6	"Episode 18"	Mizuki Iwadare	Takamitsu Kohno	Yusuke Yamamoto	February 16, 2026
19	7	"Episode 19"	Hiroki Nagashima	Takayo Ikami	Sotaro Shimizu	February 23, 2026
20	8	"Episode 20"	Saka Ikeda	Keiichiro Ochi	Saka Ikeda	March 2, 2026
21	9	"Episode 21"	Hitomi Ezoe	Keiichiro Ochi	Hitomi Ezoe	March 9, 2026
22	10	"Episode 22"	Yūki Nakagami & Yōko Kanamori	Takamitsu Kohno	Kagetsu Aizawa	March 16, 2026
23	11	"Episode 23"	Yukiko Tsukahara	Takamitsu Kohno	Yusuke Yamamoto	March 23, 2026
24	12	"Episode 24"	Fumiya Goto & Yōko Kanamori	Keiichiro Ochi	Yusuke Yamamoto, Yuzo Sato & Yōko Kanamori	March 30, 2026

=== Other media ===
The Princess is featured as one of the playable characters in the video game Captain Velvet Meteor: The Jump+ Dimensions that was released on the Nintendo Switch on July 28, 2022.

== Reception ==
In 2020, the series ranked second in the Next Manga Award in the web manga category. Makoto Yukimura, author of Vinland Saga, recommended the series, calling it his "favorite manga these days".

In a review for the anime adaptation, Kevin Cormack of Anime News Network was slightly more critical of the series. He considered the show's central premise to be too repetitive despite some attempts to shake up the formula and compared the Princess to the protagonist of Sleepy Princess in the Demon Castle, finding the former a significantly less interesting lead. However, he found the other characters, such as Tortura and the Hell-Lord, to be more varied and was more positive of some "wholesome" moments in the show.

== See also ==
- Senyu, another manga series by the same author
