= Taishi Murata =

Japanese voice actor (born 1982)

- 村田 太志
- Born: May 13, 1982 (age 44); Kōchi Prefecture, Japan
- Occupation: Voice actor
- Years active: 2009–present
- Agent: Across Entertainment

Taishi Murata (村田 太志, Murata Taishi; born May 13, 1982) is a Japanese voice actor. He is affiliated with Across Entertainment.

== Filmography ==
=== Television animation ===
Year	Title	Role	Note
2010	Yumeiro Patissiere	Niklas Hayashi	
2011	Yu-Gi-Oh! Zexal	Takashi Todoroki	
2012	The Pet Girl of Sakurasou	Daichi Miyahara	
2012	Yu-Gi-Oh! Zexal II	Takashi Todoroki	
2013	Beast Saga	Geedam, Guerru	
2013	Ace of Diamond	Keisuke Miyauchi	
2013	Futari wa Milky Holmes	Red Lion of the Gale	
2013	Silver Spoon	Taro Ochanomizu	
2013	Log Horizon	Aizel	
2013	Ore no Kanojo to Osananajimi ga Shuraba Sugiru	Yamamoto	
2013	Unbreakable Machine-Doll	Crow	
2014	Aldnoah.Zero	Calm Craftman	
2014	Baby Steps	Eiichirō Maruo	
2014	Daimidaler: Prince vs Penguin Empire	Michael	
2014	Shirobako	Onodera	
2015	Ace of the Diamond Season 2	Takeru Asou	
2015	Aldnoah.Zero 2	Calm Craftman	
2015	Baby Steps Season 2	Eiichirō Maruo	
2015	Durarara!!x2 Ten	Hiroto Shijima	
2015	Haikyū!! 2	Akinori Konoha	
2015	Food Wars: Shokugeki no Soma	Shun Ibusaki	
2015	Mobile Suit Gundam: Iron-Blooded Orphans	Norba Shino	
2015	Noragami Aragoto	Utami	
2015	Onsen Yōsei Hakone-chan	Tōya	
2015	Subete ga F ni Naru	Fukashi Hamanaka	
2016	Active Raid	Tomoki Hachijō	
2016	Age 12: A Little Heart-Pounding	Tomoya	
2016	All Out!!	Masaru Ebumi	
2016	Prince of Stride: Alternative	Takeshi Eifuku	
2016	Rin-ne	Matsugo	
2016	Twin Star Exorcists	Atsushi Sukumozuka	
2017	Dragon Ball Super	Kai, Arak	
2017	Just Because!	Haruto Sōma	
2017	TSUKIPRO THE ANIMATION	Ren Munakata	
2017	Made in Abyss	Jiruo	
2018	Sword Art Online: Alicization	Volo Levantein	
2019	Ace of the Diamond act II	Takeru Asou	
2019	Beyblade Burst GT	Joe Rurikawa	
2020	Bakugan: Armored Alliance	Ajit	
2020	Kaguya-sama: Love Is War?	Kazeno	
2020	Magatsu Wahrheit -Zuerst-	Damian	
2021	86	Kujo Niko	
2021	TSUKIPRO THE ANIMATION 2	Ren Munakata	
2021	Blue Period	Takuro Ishii	
2021	Amaim Warrior at the Borderline	I-LeS Nayuta	
2022	Kaguya-sama: Love Is War – Ultra Romantic	Kazeno	
2023	Oshi no Ko	Pieyon	
2024	Chillin' in Another World with Level 2 Super Cheat Powers	Blonde Hero	
2024	That Time I Got Reincarnated as a Slime	Fritz	
2025	Dr. Stone: Science Future	Max	
2026	Iron Wok Jan	Tomohide Jun	
2026	Marronnier Ōkoku no Shichinin no Kishi	Swordsman	

=== Film animation ===
Year	Title	Role	Note
2020	The Stranger by the Shore	Shun Hashimoto	
2021	Pretty Guardian Sailor Moon Eternal The Movie	Artemis	2-Part Film, Season 4 of Sailor Moon Crystal (Dead Moon arc); Replacing Yoohei Ōbayashi
2023	Pretty Guardian Sailor Moon Cosmos The Movie	Artemis	2-Part Film, Season 5 of Sailor Moon Crystal (Shadow Galactica arc)

=== Original net animation ===
- A.I.C.O. -Incarnation- (2018), Kazuki Minase
- Romantic Killer (2022), Ryuya

=== Video games ===
- Super Bomberman R (Red Bomberman)
- Grimms Notes (Katze)
- Yakuza: Like A Dragon (young Masumi Arakawa)

=== Dubbing ===
- Cymbeline (Cloten (Anton Yelchin))
- Step Up: All In (Robert "Moose" Alexander III (Adam G. Sevani))
