= Pine Jam =

Japanese animation studio

Pine Jam Co., Ltd.
- Native name: 株式会社パインジャム
- Romanized name: Kabushiki-gaisha Pain Jamu
- Type: Kabushiki gaisha
- Industry: Japanese animation
- Founded: July 3, 2015
- Headquarters: Suginami, Tokyo, Japan
- Key people: Kazuyoshi Mukaitouge (CEO)
- Number of employees: 22
- Website: pinejam.jp

Pine Jam Co., Ltd. (株式会社パインジャム, Kabushiki-gaisha Pain Jamu) is a Japanese animation studio established on July 3, 2015, by ex-Eight Bit producer Kazuyoshi Mukaitouge.

== Works ==
=== Anime television series ===
Title	Director(s)	First run start date	First run end date	Eps	Note(s)	Ref(s)
Mahou Shoujo Nante Mouiidesukara	Kazuhiro Yoneda	January 12, 2016	December 21, 2016	24	Adaptation of the manga series by Sui Futami.	
Gamers!	Manabu Okamoto	July 13, 2017	September 28, 2017	12	Adaptation of the light novel series by Sekina Aoi.	
Just Because!	Atsushi Kobayashi	October 5, 2017	December 28, 2017	12	Original work.	
Gleipnir	Kazuhiro Yoneda	April 5, 2020	June 28, 2020	13	Adaptation of the manga series by Sun Takeda.	
Kageki Shojo!!	Kazuhiro Yoneda	July 4, 2021	September 26, 2021	13	Adaptation of the manga series by Kumiko Saiki.	
Do It Yourself!!	Kazuhiro Yoneda	October 6, 2022	December 22, 2022	12	Original work.	
Kubo Won't Let Me Be Invisible	Kazuomi Koga	January 10, 2023	June 20, 2023	12	Adaptation of the manga series by Nene Yukimori.	
Paradox Live the Animation	Naoya Ando	October 3, 2023	December 26, 2023	12	Adaptation of the multimedia franchise by Avex Pictures and GCREST.	
'Tis Time for "Torture," Princess	Yōko Kanamori	January 9, 2024	March 26, 2024	12	Adaptation of the manga series by Robinson Haruhara and Hirakei.	
'Tis Time for "Torture," Princess (season 2)	Yōko Kanamori	January 12, 2026	TBA	TBA	Sequel to 'Tis Time for "Torture," Princess.	

=== Original video animation ===
Title	Director(s)	Release date	Eps	Note(s)	Ref(s)
Tawawa on Monday	Kōsuke Murayama	December 29, 2016	2	Sequel to Tawawa on Monday.	
Hozuki's Coolheadedness	Kazuhiro Yoneda	September 20, 2019 — August 21, 2020	3	Side story of Hozuki's Coolheadedness.	

=== Original net animation ===
Title	Director(s)	First run start date	First run end date	Eps	Note(s)	Ref(s)
Tawawa on Monday	Kōsuke Murayama	October 10, 2016	December 26, 2016	12	Adaptation of the illustrations by Kiseki Himura.	

=== Anime films ===
Title	Director(s)	Release date	Ref(s)
Vspo!	Hiroki Hirano	2025	

=== Video games ===
Year	Title	Developer	Animation producer(s)	Role(s)	Note(s)	Refs.
2025	Puella Magi Madoka Magica: Magia Exedra	Pokelabo f4samurai	TBA	Opening animation production (with Shaft)	TBA	
