= Baby Steps (manga) =

Japanese manga series

- First tankōbon volume cover, featuring Eiichirō Maruo and Natsu Takasaki

ベイビーステップ (Beibī Suteppu)
- Genre: Sports
- Manga
- Written by: Hikaru Katsuki
- Published by: Kodansha
- English publisher: US: Kodansha
- Magazine: Weekly Shōnen Magazine
- Original run: October 17, 2007 – November 1, 2017
- Volumes: 47
- Anime television series
- Directed by: Masahiko Murata
- Produced by: Kenji Saito
- Written by: Katsuhiko Chiba
- Music by: Yoichiro Yoshikawa; Kōhei Yamada (S2)
- Studio: Pierrot
- Original network: NHK-E
- Original run: April 6, 2014 – September 20, 2015
- Episodes: 50
- icon

Baby Steps (Japanese: ベイビーステップ, Hepburn: Beibī Suteppu) is a Japanese manga series by Hikaru Katsuki. It was serialized in Kodansha's shōnen manga magazine Weekly Shōnen Magazine from October 2007 to November 2017, with its chapters collected in 47 tankōbon volumes. The story is centered on Eiichirō Maruo, a first year honor student who one day decides that he is lacking exercise. He then joins the Southern Tennis Club (STC) where he begins his tennis journey.

The manga was adapted into a 25-episode anime television series by studio Pierrot, which was broadcast on NHK-E from April to September 2014. A 25-episode second season was broadcast from April to September 2015.

In 2014, Baby Steps won the 38th Kodansha Manga Award in the shōnen category.

== Story ==
Eiichirō Maruo, a first year honor student, one day decides he is unhappy with the way things are and lacks exercise. He finds a flyer for the Tennis Club and decides to check it out. He is instantly captivated by it. With no prior experience and poor physical conditioning, he embarks on a tennis journey using his smarts, dedication and strong work ethic. He uses his inherent studious nature to develop an extremely strategic approach to tennis, taking notes on the habits and tendencies of his opponents thus allowing him to predict their shots before they make them.

== Characters ==
=== Southern Tennis Club ===
Eiichirō Maruo (丸尾 栄一郎, Maruo Eiichirō)
Voiced by: Taishi Murata
Eiichirō Maruo, also called Ei-chan (エーちゃん) by his friends, is an honor student who quickly became famous for his meticulous note-taking in class. During his first year of high school, however, he got into a rut studying all of the time and wanted to find a way to exercise. When he meets Natsu, a girl in the same year as him, her passion for tennis convinces him to try playing it. Like Natsu and their senpai Takuma, Ei-chan becomes a member of a prominent youth tennis program at Southern Tennis Club (STC). His years of experience in studying and taking notes help him in his path to become a tennis player. His aim is to become a professional tennis player. Ei-chan and Natsu's growing relationship is also a major part of the series.
Natsu Takasaki (鷹崎 奈津, Takasaki Natsu)
Voiced by: Minako Kotobuki
Natsu Takasaki, also known as Nat-chan (なっちゃん), is a member of Southern Tennis Club and has played tennis since she was very young. She studies at the same high school and in the same year as Maruo. She is aiming to become a professional player. Natsu is the exact opposite of Maruo tennis-wise. She is always very optimistic and encouraging toward Maruo, and the two become very close as the series progresses.
Takuma Egawa (江川 逞, Egawa Takuma)
Voiced by: Daisuke Namikawa
Takuma is one year older than Ei-chan and Nat-chan and attends the same high school, where he is known as a delinquent. He and Natsu have known each other for a long time through tennis practice at STC. He showed a talent for tennis at a young age. He is one of the best junior players in Japan, and he aims to go pro. He is often antagonistic toward others, but he is also protective of Natsu.
Yukichi Fukazawa (深沢 諭吉, Fukazawa Yukichi)
Voiced by: Hiro Shimono
Another high school player who practices at STC. Ei-chan impresses him so much after a certain event that he calls Ei-chan "aniki" ("big bro"). He often offers scouting info on other players to Ei-chan and supports him during his matches.
Yūsaku Miura (三浦優作, Miura Yūsaku)
Voiced by: Taiten Kusunoki
One of the boys' coaches at STC. He becomes very interested in helping Maruo after seeing his work ethic and how quickly he is able to improve.
Yūki Tajima (田島 勇樹, Tajima Yūki)
Voiced by: Yūki
An elementary school student who practices at STC. He teases Maruo a lot at first (despite Maruo being eight years older than him), but gradually becomes a friend.

=== Ōsugi High School ===
Kojirō Kageyama (影山 小次郎, Kageyama Kojirō)
Voiced by: Takuma Terashima
Maruo's best friend from school. He is a member of the shogi club at school. He often comes to tennis matches to support him.
Himeko Sasaki (佐々木姫子, Sasaki Himeko)
Voiced by: Asami Seto
An honor student who is in the same class as Maruo and Kageyama (and later Natsu). She develops a crush on Maruo as tennis begins to change him for the better, but Maruo is unaware of it. She often watches his tennis matches with Kageyama.

=== Kanagawa Prefecture Junior Players ===
Hiroshi Araya (荒谷 寛, Araya Hiroshi)
Voiced by: Wataru Hatano
The top player in Kanagawa Prefecture after Egawa (and as a result, Egawa's rival). He trains at GITC and is the same age as Maruo. He is left-handed baseline player with explosive power. He often yells loudly after winning points in his matches.
Takuya Miyagawa (宮川 卓也, Miyagawa Takuya)
Voiced by: Tetsuya Kakihara
One of the top players in Kanagawa Prefecture. He trains at Miyagawa Tennis Academy. He is a year younger than Maruo but very tall like Egawa. Like Maruo, he has a strange quirk during matches: he drinks hot kobucha (kelp tea) and eats umeboshi (pickled plums).
Ryō Ōbayashi (大林 良, Ōbayashi Ryō)
Voiced by: Tomoaki Maeno
The first seeded player Maruo ever plays against in a tournament. He is a year older than Maruo and is a serve-and-volley player. He becomes Miyagawa's senpai when the younger player enters the same high school.
Hiromi Iwasa (岩佐 博水, Iwasa Hiromi)
Voiced by: Shintarō Asanuma
He is a player with a unique and unpredictable style of play that focuses on shot placement.

=== Kanto Regional Junior Players ===
Takayuki Okada (岡田 隆行, Okada Takayuki)
Voiced by: Kentarō Itō
He lives in Chiba Prefecture. He admires Miki Yazawa, and also plays like her.
Yoshiaki Ide (井出 義明, Ide Yoshiaki)
Voiced by: KENN
He lives in Saitama Prefecture. He plays rather sensuously sensitive, but skillful tennis.
Sakuya Takagi (高木 朔夜, Takagi Sakuya)
Voiced by: Masakazu Morita
He lives in Tokyo. He and Nabae attend the same high school and have trained at the same tennis academy since they were kids.

=== All-Japan National Junior Players ===
Yū Nabae (難波江 優, Nabae Yū)
Voiced by: Takahiro Sakurai
Nationally famous junior player who lives in Tokyo. Like Maruo, he has a habit of taking notes, but he does it on a laptop.

=== Florida Tennis Academy ===
Sōji Ike (池 爽児, Ike Sōji)
Voiced by: Yoshimasa Hosoya
Also known as Sou-chan, is a professional tennis player who was previously a member of the Southern tennis club, same as Natsu, Maruo and Takuma. He was introduced to tennis by Nat-chan but quickly surpassed her and players of his age. Soji is in the same age as Eichiro. Currently ranked Top 1 in Japan and is aiming for the title of the best tennis player in the world.
Alex O'Brian (アレックス・オブライアン, Arekkusu Oburaian)
Voiced by: Hiroshi Kamiya
Marcia O'Brian (マーシャ・オブライアン, Maasha Oburaian)
Voiced by: Megumi Han
Atsushi Taira (平 敦士, Taira Atsushi)
Voiced by: Takuya Eguchi
Ramesh Krishna (ラメス・クリシュナ, Ramesu Kurishuna)
Voiced by: Natsuki Hanae
Mike Maguire (マイク・マグワイヤ, Maiku Maguwaiya)
Voiced by: Kenyu Horiuchi
He is a sports psychologist who sometimes visits STC, so he knows many of the coaches and players there.

== Media ==
=== Manga ===
Written and illustrated by Hikaru Katsuki, Baby Steps was serialized for ten years in Kodansha's shōnen manga magazine Weekly Shōnen Magazine from October 17, 2007, to November 1, 2017. Kodansha collected its chapters in 47 tankōbon volumes, released from February 15, 2008, to December 15, 2017.

Kodansha published the series in English on their K Manga service.

==== Volumes ====
No.	Release date	ISBN
1	February 15, 2008	978-4-06-363957-5
2	March 17, 2008	978-4-06-363968-1
3	May 16, 2008	978-4-06-363991-9
4	August 12, 2008	978-4-06-384027-8
5	October 17, 2008	978-4-06-384052-0
6	January 16, 2009	978-4-06-384089-6
7	April 17, 2009	978-4-06-384124-4
8	June 17, 2009	978-4-06-384149-7
9	September 17, 2009	978-4-06-384188-6
10	November 17, 2009	978-4-06-384214-2
11	February 17, 2010	978-4-06-384248-7
12	April 16, 2010	978-4-06-384283-8
13	July 16, 2010	978-4-06-384329-3
14	October 15, 2010	978-4-06-384381-1
15	January 17, 2011	978-4-06-384428-3
16	April 15, 2011	978-4-06-384459-7
17	June 17, 2011	978-4-06-384506-8
18	September 16, 2011	978-4-06-384558-7
19	November 17, 2011	978-4-06-384580-8
20	February 17, 2012	978-4-06-384631-7
21	April 17, 2012	978-4-06-384655-3
22	July 17, 2012	978-4-06-384706-2
23	September 14, 2012	978-4-06-384735-2
24	December 17, 2012	978-4-06-384782-6
25	February 15, 2013	978-4-06-384812-0
26	May 17, 2013	978-4-06-384865-6
27	August 16, 2013	978-4-06-394911-7
28	November 15, 2013	978-4-06-394964-3
29	January 17, 2014	978-4-06-394994-0
30	March 17, 2014	978-4-06-395028-1
31	June 17, 2014	978-4-06-395105-9
32	August 16, 2014	978-4-06-395160-8
33	November 17, 2014	978-4-06-395244-5
34	March 17, 2015	978-4-06-395346-6
35	May 15, 2015	978-4-06-395399-2
36	August 17, 2015	978-4-06-395461-6
37	October 16, 2015	978-4-06-395520-0
38	January 15, 2016	978-4-06-395580-4
39	March 17, 2016	978-4-06395623-8
40	June 17, 2016	978-4-06-395689-4
41	August 17, 2016	978-4-06-395728-0
42	November 17, 2016	978-4-06-395803-4
43	January 17, 2017	978-4-06-395853-9
44	April 17, 2017	978-4-06-395921-5
45	June 16, 2017	978-4-06-395961-1
46	September 15, 2017	978-4-06-510191-9
47	December 15, 2017	978-4-06-510974-8

=== Anime ===
An anime television series adaptation was announced in November 2013. Animated by studio Pierrot, the series was broadcast for 25 episodes on NHK Educational TV from April 6 to September 21, 2014. Mao Abe performed the opening theme "Believe in yourself" and Babyraids performed the ending theme "Baby Steps" (ベイビーステップ, Beibī Suteppu).

A 25-episode second season was broadcast from April 5 to September 20, 2015. Mao Abe's "Believe in yourself" was used again as the opening theme for the second season, while Ganbare! Victory performed the ending theme "Yume no Tsuzuki" (夢のつづき; "Dream Continuation").

== Reception ==
In 2014, Baby Steps won the 38th Kodansha Manga Award in shōnen category.
