= Amaim Warrior at the Borderline =

Japanese anime television series

- Key visual

境界戦機 (Kyōkai Senki)
- Genre: Mecha; Military
- Created by: Sunrise Beyond
- Manga

Kyōkai Senki: Frost Flower
- Written by: Hiroto Taguchi
- Published by: Hobby Japan
- Magazine: Monthly Hobby Japan
- Original run: July 21, 2021 – present
- Anime television series
- Directed by: Nobuyoshi Habara
- Produced by: Hiroki Komatsu; Yoshikazu Beniya
- Written by: Noboru Kimura
- Music by: Rasmus Faber
- Studio: Sunrise Beyond
- Licensed by: Crunchyroll: SEA: Mighty Media
- Original network: TV Tokyo, MBS TV, BS11
- Original run: October 5, 2021 – June 28, 2022
- Episodes: 25
- Original net animation

UltraSteel Ogre-Gear
- Directed by: Masami Obari
- Written by: Noboru Kimura
- Music by: Rasmus Faber
- Studio: Sunrise Beyond
- Released: August 10, 2023 – October 19, 2023
- Episodes: 6
- icon

Amaim Warrior at the Borderline (Japanese: 境界戦機, Hepburn: Kyōkai Senki; "War Machines on the Borderline") is an original Japanese anime television series animated by Sunrise Beyond. A photonovel series titled Kyōkai Senki: Frost Flower has been serialized in Hobby Japan's Monthly Hobby Japan magazine since July 2021. The series aired from October 2021 to June 2022.

== Plot ==
In the mid-20th century, as a result of the economic crisis and a collapsing birthrate, Japan was on the verge of becoming a failed state. In response, foreign nations sent forces to intervene. However, foreign intervention quickly became a foreign occupation, and the competing foreign nations started the destructive Boundary War, fought with autonomous drone mecha called AMAIMs.

By the year 2061, the Boundary War has ended but Japan has been divided into four occupied zones where native Japanese are treated like second-class citizens. In the wake of the resulting social upheaval and unrest, a young boy named Amō Shiiba stumbles across an abandoned AMAIM called Kenbu and a rogue autonomous AI named Gai. With Kenbu and Gai, Amō has the opportunity to change the course of history for both himself and the entire nation of Japan.

== Characters ==
=== Main characters ===
Amō Shiiba (椎葉 アモウ, Shiiba Amō)
Voiced by: Gen Satō (Japanese); Ry McKeand (English)
A 16-year-old boy orphaned by the Boundary Wars, he became a mechanic after discovering an abandoned AMAIM workshop, in which he found a left-over human-piloted, interface-comtrolled AMAIM unit, whose name Gai identifies as "Kenbu", and later becomes its designated pilot. While shy and kind, he enjoys any new experiences he makes.
Gashin Tezuka (鉄塚 ガシン, Tezuka Gashin)
Voiced by: Yūto Uemura (Japanese); Patrick Mealey (English)
A mecha pilot ace for the Japanese resistance group Yatagarasu. His father was the previous pilot of his AMAIM unit "Jogan", but he was killed, leaving Tezuka embittered about Japan's occupation.
Shion Shishibe (紫々部 シオン, Shishibe Shion)
Voiced by: Kana Ichinose (Japanese); Madeline Dorroh (English)
I-LeS Gai (I-LeS ガイ)
Voiced by: Natsumi Fujiwara (Japanese); Michelle Marie (English)
An autonomous AI unit with a grandiloquent but loyal personality. After he is rescued by Amō, he finishes assembling the Kendu for him and acts as the AMAIM's control computer. He is linked with the military and public information and communication networks, an asset which saves Amō more than once. His onscreen avatar is an over-fluffed, scarlet red Komainu.
I-LeS Kei (I-LeS ケイ)
Voiced by: Yui Ishikawa (Japanese); Jackie Lastra (English)
Tezuka's AI control unit controlling "Jogan". Her avatar is a white kitsune.
I-LeS Nayuta (I-LeS ナユタ)
Voiced by: Taishi Murata (Japanese); Michael Kovach (English)
Shion's ANAIM AI control unit. His avatar form is a purple Jakalope with hooves.

=== Yatagarasu ===
Gōken Kumai (熊井 ゴウケン, Kumai Gōken)
Voiced by: Masaki Terasoma (Japanese); Chris Tergliafera (English)
The leader of Yatagarasu Special Forces Group Two.
Risa Kōzaki (甲咲 リサ, Kōzaki Risa)
Voiced by: Masumi Asano (Japanese); Haviland Stillwell (English)
A friendly leading member of Yatagarasu whose family was killed in a crash with an Asia Entente car, whose drivers were unjustly cleared of any wrongdoing. She is killed when the Ghost attacks the camp shortly after Amō's arrival.
Eiji Umasaki (馬﨑 エイジ, Umasaki Eiji)
Voiced by: Kazuhiro Nakaya (Japanese); Luis Bermudez (English)
Misuzu Maki (槙 ミスズ, Maki Misuzu)
Voiced by: Ayaka Nanase (Japanese); Brittany Cox (English)
The Special Forces Group Two's chief mechanic.
Takeru Muramatsu (村松 タケル, Muramatsu Takeru)
Voiced by: Shin Matsushige (Japanese); Brendan Blaber (English)
Kiryu Udou (宇堂 キリュウ, Udō Kiryū)
Voiced by: Rikiya Koyama (Japanese); Eliah Mountjoy (English)

=== Arahabaki ===
Anna Takayanagi (高柳 アンナ, Takayanagi Anna)
Voiced by: Yuka Nukui (Japanese); Kayli Mills (English)
Takeru Konno (今野 タケル, Konno Takeru)
Voiced by: Daichi Hayashi (Japanese); Aleks Le (English)

=== Confederation of Oceania ===
Jeffrey Wilson (ジェフリー・ウィルソン, Jefurī Wiruson)
Voiced by: Tetsu Inada (Japanese); Keith Silverstein (English)
A ruthless Oceania officer who despises his duty in Japan and therefore seeks to reap merits by any means necessary.
Kate Byrne (ケイト・バーン, Keito Bān)
Voiced by: Shizuka Ishigami (Japanese); Caitlyn Elizabeth (English)
A female Oceania lieutenant and Wilson's subordinate.
Simon Tate (サイモン・テイト, Saimon Teito)
Voiced by: Volcano Ōta (Japanese); Paul Guyet (English)
Oliver Martin (オリバー・マーティン, Oribā Mātin)
Voiced by: Tarō Kiuchi (Japanese); Mike McFarland (English)

=== North America Coalition ===
Brad Watt (ブラッド・ワット, Buraddo Watto)
Voiced by: Yūki Ono (Japanese); Doug Erholtz (English)
A captain of the North American Coalition. An exceptionally skilled military analyst, he is intrigued by the concept of piloted AMAIMs.
Raymond Hardy (レイモンド・ハーディー, Reimondo Hādī)
Voiced by: Tarusuke Shingaki (Japanese); Brent Mukai (English)
An American warrant officer, and Watt's subordinate and friend.
Charley Orley (チャーリー・オーレイ, Chārī Ōrei)
Voiced by: Masayuki Kato (Japanese); Brandon Winckler (English)
Roger Young (ロジャー・ヤング, Rojā Yangu)
Voiced by: Shunichi Maki (Japanese); Major Attaway (English)
Sofia Louis (ソフィア・ルイス, Sofia Ruisu)
Voiced by: Saori Ōnishi (Japanese); Amanda Turen (English)
Joe Spears (ジョウ・スピアーズ, Jō Supiāzu)
Voiced by: Yutaka Nakano (Japanese); Gary Littman (English)
Tony Blanc (トニー・ブランク, Tonī Buranku)
Voiced by: Naoya Uchida (Japanese); Chris Guerrero (English)
Elliot Knox (エリオット・ノックス, Eriotto Nokkusu)
Voiced by: Kento Shiraishi (Japanese); Robb Moreira (English)
Roy Walker (ロイ・ウォーカー, Roi Wōkā)
Voiced by: Hironori Saitō (Japanese); Tom Laflin (English)
Gregory Cartland (グレゴリー・カートランド, Guregorī Kātorando)
Voiced by: Hinata Tadokoro (Japanese); Gianni Matragrano (English)
Mike Weaver (マイク・ウィーバー, Maiku Wībā)
Voiced by: Jun Inoue (Japanese); Mike Schneider (English)

=== Asia Free Trade Entente ===
Ho Guan (ホウ・グアン, Hō Guan)
Voiced by: Masaaki Mizunaka (Japanese); George Ledoux (English)
Sun Chong (スン・チョン, Sun Chon)
Voiced by: Kazumasa Nakamura (Japanese); Khoi Dao (English)
Liu Fu (リウ・フウ, Riu Fū)
Voiced by: Makoto Furukawa (Japanese); Daman Mills (English)
Xin Haoran (シン・ハオラン, Shin Haoran)
Voiced by: Ryō Sugisaki
Zhao Kweihua (ツァオ・クェイワァ, Tsao Kueiwā)
Voiced by: Kenta Sasa
Nadeck Elam (ナデート・イーラム, Nadēto Īramu)
Voiced by: Ryūnosuke Watanuki
Luang Thanarat (ルアン・タナラット, Ruan Tanaratto)
Voiced by: Shōta Yamamoto

=== Federation of Great Eurasia ===
Alexei Zelenoy (アレクセイ・ゼレノイ, Arekushisu Zerenoi)
Voiced by: Daisuke Namikawa (Japanese); Landon McDonald (English)
Dahlia Lvov (ダリア・リヴォフ, Daria Rivofu)
Voiced by: Aya Endo (Japanese); Heather Gonzalez (English)
Boris Gretkov (ボリツ・グレツコフ, Boritsu Guretsukofu)
Voiced by: Kōsuke Katayama (Japanese); Gary Littman (English)

=== A.R.E.S ===
Collin Dialo (コリン・ディアロ, Korin Diaro)
Voiced by: Kanehira Yamamoto (Japanese); J. Michael Tatum (English)

=== Brenson Corp ===
German Gobert (ジェルマン・ゴベール, Jeruman Gobēru)
Voiced by: Jun Fukuyama (Japanese); Kevin M. Connolly (English)

=== Others ===
Takuto Ōnishi (大西 タクト, Shishibe Shion)
Voiced by: Taito Ban (Japanese); Luis Bermudez (English)
Tsubasa Mishima (三島 ツバサ, Mishima Tsubasa)
Voiced by: Daiki Kobayashi (Japanese); Bryson Baugus (English)
Ken Tanasaka (田名坂 ケン, Tanazaka Ken)
Voiced by: Shogo Sakata (Japanese); Brandon Winckler (English)
Gen Sakuma (佐久間 ゲン, Sakuma Gen)
Voiced by: Katsuhisa Hōki (Japanese); Doug Stone (English)
Yoriko Sakuma (佐久間 ヨリコ, Sakuma Yoriko)
Voiced by: Hitomi Shogawa
Tokuji Iwata (岩田 トクジ, Iwata Tokuji)
Voiced by: Hitoshi Bifu (Japanese); Adin Rudd (English)
Yūsei Suenaga (末永 ユウセイ, Suenaga Yūsei)
Voiced by: Kenichi Suzumura (Japanese); Kieran Regan (English)

== Media ==
=== Photonovel ===
A photonovel series titled Kyōkai Senki: Frost Flower (境界戦機 フロストフラワー, Kyōkai Senki Furosuto Furawā) began serialization in Hobby Japan's Monthly Hobby Japan magazine since July 21, 2021.

=== Anime ===
Sunrise Beyond and Bandai Spirits revealed the project on March 16, 2021. The series was directed by Nobuyoshi Habara and written by Noboru Kimura. Character designs were provided by Kenichi Ohnuki, while Rasmus Faber composed the music. It aired from October 5 to December 28, 2021, on TV Tokyo, MBS and BS11. (Note: TV Tokyo listed the series premiere at 25:30 on October 4, 2021, which is effectively 1:30 a.m. JST on October 5.) Blank Paper performed the series' opening theme song "enemy". Funimation licensed the series outside of Asia. Just right after the first part ended, a second part was announced, and it aired from April 12 to June 28, 2022. (Note: TV Tokyo listed the premiere of the second half at 24:00 on April 11, 2022, which is effectively at midnight JST on April 12.)

On April 11, 2022, Crunchyroll announced that the series would receive an English dub, which premiered on April 25.

==== Episode list ====
No.	Title (Note: All English titles are taken from Funimation.)	Directed by	Written by	Storyboarded by	Original release date
Part 1
1	"Activate"; Transliteration: "Kidō" (Japanese: 起動)	Nobuyoshi Habara; Tatsunari Koyano	Noboru Kimura	Nobuyoshi Habara	October 5, 2021
In the mid-20th century, due to economic collapse and a shrinking population, Japan became a failed state, necessitating foreign nations to intervene. However, this began a war between the competing foreign powers for control of Japan through the use of autonomous mecha units called AMAIMs in a conflict known as the Boundary War. By 2061, the war has long ended, but Japan remains divided into four occupied regions. Amō Shiiba is a young orphan who is slowly rebuilding an abandoned AMAIM he found. While scavenging for parts, he comes across an AI core containing an autonomous AI calling itself Gai who requests Amō save him before his battery runs out. Amō plugs Gai into his salvaged AMAIM, and Gai begins rebuilding it and learns it is a rare manned model called Kenbu. Meanwhile, Oceanian mercenaries falsely accuse Amō and his scavenger friends of terrorism, forcing him to pilot Kenbu to destroy the AMAIMs sent after him.
2	"Voyage"; Transliteration: "Funade" (Japanese: 船出)	Takahiro Tamano	Noboru Kimura	Takeshi Mori	October 12, 2021
In order to protect his friends, Amō proclaims himself a terrorist who exploited them to build Kenbu before fleeing. Oceania is forced to release his friends to save face while they hunt for Amō. Soon, they reach a small coastal village where Gai has to temporarily enter sleep mode to process the new data he has acquired. Amō heads out to search for food, and ends up helping an elderly farmer harvest his crops. However, the farmer and his wife discover Amō is a fugitive, but decide to shelter him anyways, as they realize he's not a terrorist. They also have no love for the Oceania, as their son was killed during the Boundary War. Realizing his presence will only endanger the couple, Amō leaves in the middle of the night and borrows their son's abandoned fishing boat. As Amō and Gai leave Oceania's territory, they are ambushed by the Asian military. While Amō and Gai put up an effective fight, they are quickly outnumbered and pinned down until they receive assistance from another manned AMAIM.
3	"Reason to Fight"; Transliteration: "Tatakau Riyū" (Japanese: 戦う理由)	Masashi Abe	Noboru Kimura	Masashi Abe	October 19, 2021
Amō and Gai are rescued by another AMAIM pilot, Gashin Tezuka who pilots the AMAIM Jogan and is assisted by another autonomous AI named Kei. Gashin reveals he is part of the Japanese liberation group Yatagarasu and takes Amō to their base camp, where he meets the local leader, Goken Kumai. Kumai reveals that Kenbu was originally commissioned by Yatagarasu and belongs to the group, but was lost after the Yatagarasu branch it was destined for was destroyed. Kumai offers to let Amō join Yatagarasu as Kenbu's pilot, or give up Kenbu and return to civilian life under a new identity. It's also revealed Gashin's father was Jogan's previous pilot before being killed. Amō remains uncertain about joining, as he is afraid of having to fight. After spending some time with other Yatagarasu members and sympathizing with their cause, Amō ultimately decides to join them while Kenbu is upgraded. Amō and Gashin then participate in a mock battle where they switch to using each other's AMAIMs, and the battle ends in a draw. However, shortly after the conclusion of the mock battle, the base camp is suddenly attacked by mysterious black AMAIM.
4	"Separate Ways"; Transliteration: "Betsuri" (Japanese: 別離)	Masayuki Iimura	Noboru Kimura	Akihiro Enomoto	October 26, 2021
Amō and Gashin return to the camp to find it being attacked by an unknown AMAIM that has been nicknamed the "Ghost". Working together, Amō and Gashin are able to critically damage the Ghost and force it to retreat. However, during the fighting, one of the Yatagarasu members Amō had grown close with, Risa, had been killed trying to distract the Ghost. Amō is traumatized upon learning of Risa's death while Yatagarasu evacuates the area. Shortly after, officers from the North American military to investigate the site, and manage to conclude that Kenbu and Jogan battled the Ghost. Intrigued by the Ghost's presence in the area, the North American officers decide to deploy more forces. Meanwhile, Gashin leaves Amō to grieve for Risa's death. Eventually, Amō decides not to join Yatagarasu, as he's afraid of seeing people he has befriended die. Gashin allows Amō to leave with Gai, under the condition he hide Kenbu for Yatagarasu to recover later. After hiding Kenbu behind a waterfall, Amō takes his leave.
5	"Determination"; Transliteration: "Ketsui" (Japanese: 決意)	Tatsunari Koyano	Noboru Kimura	Takeshi Mori	November 2, 2021
Amō decides to head to Risa's hometown in order to return her necklace to her relatives. Meanwhile, Gashin is informed that a new AMAIM pilot has joined Yatagarasu. Upon arriving there, he meets Mr. Nose and his daughter Hina, who take him to meet Risa's friends. Amō informs them about Risa's death, but her friends reveal that Risa's family have all moved away due to scandal of her joining Yatagarasu. However, they do know where Risa's family grave is, where he can return necklace and pay his respects. That night, Mr. Nose and Hina are kidnapped by the local Deputy Governor, who intends to sell them as part of his human trafficking ring. The local townspeople protest Mr. Nose's arrest, and the Deputy Governor responds by arresting many of the protestors and sentencing them to death. Unwilling to stand by and watch more innocent people die, Amō retrieves Kenbu and rescues the prisoners while Gai broadcasts evidence of the Deputy Governor's illegal dealings. In order to save face, the Asian military releases all of the prisoners, including Mr. Nose and Hina, and orders the Deputy Governor be removed from his post. Amō leaves Risa's necklace at her family grave and reunites with Gashin, now committed to joining Yatagarasu.
6	"Voyage"; Transliteration: "Tabiji" (Japanese: 旅路)	Takahiro Tamano	Noboru Kimura	Atsushi Ōtsuki	November 9, 2021
Yatagaru's third AMAIM pilot reveals she joined the movement due to the Asian military stealing her grandfather's land. As Amō and Gashin continue on their journey to reach Yatagaru's HQ, their AMAIMs begin to suffer mechanical breakdowns due to lack of maintenance. Yatagarasu arranges for a collaborator to provide them the parts they need in a nearby city. Amō and Gashin hide their AMAIMs and head for the city. Meanwhile, the Oceanian military decides to take advantage of the Asian military's human trafficking scandal to stage an attack on the Asian territory. Amō and Gashin do their best to help civilians evacuate, but soon find themselves caught between the fighting between the Asian and Oceanian forces. Suddenly, an unknown AMAIM arrives and destroys multiple AMAIMs on both sides, forcing the Oceanian and Asian militaries to cease fighting and retreat. Amō and Gashin meet with the new AMAIM, which reveals it is controlled by the third pilot and an AI named Angelo. The pilot then exits her AMAIM and begins crying.
7	"The Hunt"; Transliteration: "Tōbatsu" (Japanese: 討伐)	Ryōki Kamitsubo	Noboru Kimura	Ryōki Kamitsubo	November 16, 2021
The third pilot introduces herself as Shion Shishibe and despite her AI calling himself Angelo, his actual name is Nayuta, while her AMAIM is called Reiki. As the trio travel to Yatagarasu's HQ, Amō becomes curious about the source of their AMAIMs and AI companions, especially since no other nation has such advanced technology. Gashin explains that they are receiving support from Brenson Corp, an unregistered corporation. Meanwhile, the North American military tasks Captain Brad Watts with hunting down Ghost, with the intention to either capture it so its AI technology can be studied, or destroy it to prevent it from falling into foreign hands. Brad leads an elite AMAIM squad to subdue Ghost, and despite being able to seriously damage it, Brad and his team suffer losses and are unable to stop Ghost from escaping. Brad promises to get revenge on Ghost for his fallen comrades. Meanwhile, Amō, Gashin, and Shion reach Yatagarasu HQ where Amō is introduced to the head of the organization, Udou Kiryu, and Brenson Corp's sales representative, German Gobert.
8	"Path to Recovery"; Transliteration: "Saisei no Tsuchioto" (Japanese: 再生の槌音)	Ryōki Kamitsubo	Misaki Morie	Takeshi Mori	November 23, 2021
German provides several upgrades for Kenbu and Jogan, such as new arm with retractable claws and additional weapons. Yatagarasu also receives a plea for help from the Fudou family, who are refugees that have fled to a nearby abandoned village for shelter who are running low on supplies. Since one of Yatagarasu's missions is to provide humanitarian relief, Udou and Goken agree to help the Fudou family. Yatagarasu helps rebuild the village, as well as constructing a well and waterwheel and repairing an old kiln. They quickly run into an issue where their efforts to build a well are blocked by a layer of thick bedrock, though they are able to build a laser drill and pile bunker to break through it. With access to water and electricity allowing them to be self sufficient, the Fudou family thanks Yatagarasu for their help.
9	"Autonomous Area" (Note: Title written as Autonomous City in the episode.); Transliteration: "Jichiku" (Japanese: 自治区)	Masashi Abe	Noboru Kimura	Masashi Abe	November 30, 2021
While on a supply run, Amō, Gashin, and Shion encounter Yuusei Suenaga, Gashin's foster brother and ex-Yatagarasu member. They both have a happy reunion and agree to meet each other again. Yuusei explains that he is the mayor of an autonomous city, where Japanese citizens can live and self govern without foreign interference. He explains that he wants to try a different path to achieve Japanese independence through negotiation and compromise rather than violence, which is why he left Yatagarasu. After touring the trio around the city, Yuusei privately offers Gashin residence in the city so that they can live together and Gashin can leave a life of violence behind. That night, German warns Gashin that Yuusei is a spy for the Asian military, which was how he was able to build the autonomous city. Gashin does his own investigation and finds that the Asian military is coercing Yuusei to give up information about Japanese rebels in return for much needed supplies for the city. Gashin then lays a trap and catches Yuusei red handed attempting to steal data from Yatagarasu. Gashin reveals that the data Yuusei stole was bait and Yatagarasu will be long gone by the time the Asian military mobilizes. Yuusei remains adamant with collaborating with the Asian military, and Gashin cannot bring himself to kill Yuusei and lets him go, wondering if he made the right choice.
10	"Expedition"; Transliteration: "Ensei" (Japanese: 遠征)	Tatsunari Koyano	Noboru Kimura	Tatsunari Koyano	December 7, 2021
On a request from German, Yatagarasu sends Amō, Gashin, and Shion to the Eurasian military held Tohoku region to rescue another resistance group, Arahabaki. Their leader, Konno, explains that they used to be the largest resistance group in the area until Eurasian officer Alexei Zelenoy took command. Meanwhile, Alexei notices the arrival of the Yatagarasu AMAIMs and decides to personally head to the frontline in his own manned AMAIM. Amō, Gashin, and Shion begin scouting the surrounding area, and discover a network of remote sensors the Eurasian military had set up to detect rebel movements. Together with their AIs, the manage to hack the sensor network to lure the Eurasian forces into a trap, where they destroy the majority of the AMAIMs, leaving only Alexei left. However, despite it being 3 versus 1, Alexei is able to hold his own, and Amō and his friends decide to fall back right as Alexei's AMAIM breaks down. After receiving thanks from Arahabaki for helping them escape, Amō, Gashin, and Shion leave the area.
11	"Encirclement"; Transliteration: "Hōimō" (Japanese: 包囲網)	Masashi Abe	Noboru Kimura	Takeshi Mori	December 14, 2021 (Note: This episode aired at 1:40 a.m. JST, 10 minutes after the original air time on TV Tokyo.)
Amō, Gashin, and Shion rendezvous with their maintenance team who begin repairing their AMAIMs. Meanwhile, Alexei gets approval to lead a flying column so that he can get his revenge on Yatagarasu. Brad and his team are contacted by German, who leaks them Ghost's current location. However, Brad notes that Ghost is likely still in Asian territory, and its self-improving nature means they will need even more troops to suppress it. Later, Amō and his friends head into a nearby city to buy supplies, and Amō accidentally runs into Brad, who recognizes his voice. That night, Amō and his friends head to a hot spring to relax, where Brad meets them. He tells them about his position as a North American soldier, as well as Ghost's location in the Oki Islands before leaving. Gashin is put on edge when another chance at revenge has presented itself.
12	"Battle of the Oki Islands (Part 1)"; Transliteration: "Oki no Shima-sen (Zenpen)" (Japanese: 隠岐の島戦（前編）)	Tomo Ōkubo	Misaki Morie	Akihiro Enomoto	December 21, 2021
Ghost attacks the Oki Islands, destroying the Asian military outposts located there and forcing the Asian military to retreat to the mainland. Amō, Gashin, and Shion head out to fight Ghost while Yatagarasu organizes a rescue mission to evacuate the Japanese residents were left behind on the islands. Meanwhile, Brad and his team keep an eye on the situation, ready to seize Ghost when the moment is right. At the Oki islands, Amō, Gashin, and Shion engage Ghost and save a detachment of Asian soldiers, who surrender to Yatagarasu and are allowed to evacuate with the civilians. Amō, Gashin, and Shion realize Ghost is far more formidable than the last they fought it, so they lure it into an abandoned ammo dump and detonate it. However, despite the massive explosion, Ghost emerges unharmed and ready to continue fighting.
13	"Battle of the Oki Islands (Part 2)"; Transliteration: "Oki no Shima-sen (Kōhen)" (Japanese: 隠岐の島戦（後編）)	Masayuki Iimura	Noboru Kimura	Fuji Teraoka	December 28, 2021
The battle between Yatagarasu and Ghost continues, but Amō, Gashin, and Shion quickly begin to find themselves outmatched by Ghost as it begins adapting to their tactics. Meanwhile, Brad watches the battle from a drone as he records all of the data. Ghost is quickly able to disable both Jogan and Reiki, leaving Kenbu as the only combat capable AMAIM. Gashin and Shion transfer most of their remaining power to Kenbu. They also find out that Ghost high performance comes at the cost of generating massive amounts of heat, and it relies on a heat sink on its back to keep itself cooled. Amō then confronts Ghost alone, with Gai removing Kenbu's limiters to allow Amō to fight Ghost on equal footing for a short period of time. Amō is able to distract Ghost long enough for Shion and Gashin to ambush it and destroy its heat sink. Rapidly heating up, Ghost attempts to flee to the ocean but Amō risks his life to stop Ghost. Ghost explodes, taking Kenbu with it. Unable to stay in the area for too long, Yatagarasu is forced to flee the islands and declare Amō missing in action. Later, Brad and his team are able to recover Ghost's AI core from the ocean floor, and Brad promises that he will put Ghost's capabilities to good use.
Part 2
14	"Eight Months Later"; Transliteration: "Hachikagetsugo" (Japanese: 8ヶ月後)	Akira Toba	Noboru Kimura	Susumu Nishizawa	April 12, 2022
Eight months after the battle with Ghost, the North American Coalition has managed to develop automated AI which they begin using in their AMAIMs, giving them a serious advantage over the other nations. Brad meanwhile is attempting to build an AMAIM that can contain Ghost. Soon, the NAC's territory begins to expand significantly, with many Japanese civilians being caught in the crossfire. Gashin, Shion, and Yatagarasu continue to fight to try and protect as many civilians as they can, but after losing contact with German and Brenson Corp, they are running short of supplies. Soon, a group of refugees and resistance warriors arrive at Yatagarasu's camp, having been chased there by advancing NAC forces. Lacking the strength to fight off an NAC army, Kumai attempts to negotiate for the safe release of the refugees, but the NAC commander sabotages the negotiations and attacks anyways. Gashin and Shion attempt to hold off the NAC army but are soon overwhelmed. However, at the last moment, Kenbu arrives and pushes back the NAC forces, revealing that Amō has survived.
15	"Reunion"; Transliteration: "Saikai" (Japanese: 再会)	Takahiro Tamano	Noboru Kimura	Takeshi Mori	April 19, 2022
With Amō's help, Yatagarasu is able to escape the NAC's encirclement. Maki then arrives, bringing a convoy of much needed supplies. She reveals she's actually the president of TRYVECTA, an AI development group affiliated with Brenson Corp. She also admits she was the person who developed Ghost. Brenson Corp took possession of Ghost but lost control of it, while Maki used Ghost as a basis to develop Gai, Kei, and Nayuta. She had intended to recover Ghost herself after the battle at the Oki Islands, but gave up the chance to save Amō and Gai instead. In addition, German betrayed Brenson Corp, trading Ghost for a position in the NAC and attempting to destroy Brenson Corp. For the past eight months, Brenson Corp has been busy rebuilding Kenbu, but Mika won't say what Amō was doing, and Amō himself seems far more distant and withdrawn than before. The next day, the NAC renews their attack, but Amō, Gai, and Shion are able to easily destroy their forces with their newly upgraded AMAIMs. When the NAC commander refuses to surrender, Amō coldly executes him, shocking everybody.
16	"Fierce Battle"; Transliteration: "Gekitō" (Japanese: 激闘)	Shōji Ikeno	Misaki Morie	Kia Asamiya	April 26, 2022
After witnessing Amō kill another person, Shion is left conflicted over her motivation to fight, while Gashin notices that Amō seems to be hiding some sort of trauma that he refuses to talk about. Meanwhile, Brad and his squad are sent to reinforce NAC forces battling a Eurasian army led by Alexei, who is invading NAC territory. The local commander, unwilling to let Brad steal the credit, decides to attack before the reinforcements arrive. Alexei takes advantage of this by luring the NAC forces into a trap, miring them in quicksand. Brad arrives just in time in a brand new AMAIM that incorporates Ghost in its program. Assisted by Ghost's rapid learning, Brad is able to destroy the majority of the Eurasian force and defeat Alexei in battle, with Alexei barely managing to escape with his life when Brad's AMAIM breaks down. Realizing that the NAC will gain a massive advantage if Brad's AMAIM is completed and mass produced, Alexei decides to retreat and regroup. Elsewhere, Amō, Gashin, and Shion arrive a Yatagarasu's new headquarters. There, Gashin and Shion confront Amō about what had happened to him in the past eight months.
17	"TRYVECTA"; Transliteration: "Toraivekuta" (Japanese: トライヴェクタ)	Masashi Abe	Noboru Kimura	Susumu Nishizawa	May 3, 2022
Seeing how concerned his friends are, Amō finally opens up about what happened in the past eight months. After German's betrayal of Brenson Corp, Amō fled with TRYVECTA to an emergency shelter, where he helped take care of the staff's children. However, the shelter was eventually discovered by German's men and assaulted, resulting in much of the staff being massacred. Amō meanwhile was forced to use a gun to kill one of the attackers in order to protect the children, becoming traumatized in the process. Meanwhile, Brad enlists German's aid in procuring blackmail material on Senator Roy Walker to prevent him from cutting the NAC's military budget. However, Brad voices his suspicion that German is involved with other elements of the NAC military as well. In the rest of the Japan, the other nations begin mobilizing their forces in preparation for more hostilities. German then talks with Joe Spears, Brad's superior officer and adoptive father, warning him that Brad is beginning to get suspicious. Spears simply replies that they can deal with Brad when the time comes.
18	"The Sanctuary"; Transliteration: "Hogoku" (Japanese: 保護区)	Makoto Hoshino	Noboru Kimura	Akihiro Enomoto	May 10, 2022
Yuusei contacts Yatagarasu, informing them of a Japanese sanctuary city that lies on the Eurasian territory's border with the NAC, which is under threat of invasion. Yatagarasu agrees to lend their aid and travel to the Sanctuary, led by Eurasian officer Cyril Zhirkov. Cyril reveals that he has a deep appreciation for Japan, and organized the Sanctuary under the guise of a corporate holding to avoid notice from his superiors. However, the NAC is preparing to invade the area, and the Eurasian military has refused to send reinforcements. The next day, Yatagarasu and Cyril's forces pretend to fight each other before ambushing the approaching NAC forces. However, Amō and his friends are caught off guard when NAC scientist Zack Taylor arrives with a unit of AMAIMs containing copies of Ghost's programming. While Amō and his friends are initially surprised, they quickly adapt and destroy the AMAIMs and force Zack to flee, pointing out his Ghost copies were incomplete. The NAC retreats from the area, and the Eurasian military, believing Cyril successfully repelled Yatagarasu, finally agrees to send reinforcements. Amō witnesses Cyril's wife giving birth to his daughter, and the baby taking a liking to him helps him overcome his trauma.
19	"Anniversary"; Transliteration: "Kinenbi" (Japanese: 記念日)	Tatsunari Koyano	Misaki Morie	Takeshi Mori	May 17, 2022
Shortly after Amō and his friends return to HQ, they and the rest of Yatagarasu begin acting strangely, secretly coming up with some sort of plan while trying to keep Gai, Kei, and Nayuta in the dark. At first, the AIs are curious about the secret operation, prodding everybody for information. However, when everybody refuses to tell them what is going on, and with the discovery that Amō and his friends have bought a number of high tech parts, they begin to fear that Yatagarasu is building a new AI to replace them. On the day the operation is supposed to commence, Gai, Kei, and Nayuta seclude themselves inside their AMAIMs, requiring Amō, Gashin, and Shion to coax them out. Amō and his friends then reveal that they have been organizing a surprise birthday party for Gai, Kei, and Nayuta to celebrate one year since their creation. In order to facilitate this, they had developed a special room where the AIs can manifest in an augmented reality system. As everybody celebrates, Udou quietly excuses himself from the celebrations and returns to his office, where it is revealed that he has secretly allied with the Eurasian, Asian, and Oceanian militaries.
20	"New Japan Cooperation Organization"; Transliteration: "Shin Nihon Kyōryoku Kikō" (Japanese: 新日本協力機構)	Tomo Ōkubo	Noboru Kimura	Susumu Nishizawa	May 24, 2022
Udou reveals to Yatagarasu that the Asian, Eurasian, and Oceanian blocs have formed an alliance to resist the NAC and are offering Yatagarasu to join in return for granting the Hokuriku region Japanese autonomy. However, the catch is that they will have to battle the NAC, who hold the legitimate Japanese government as a puppet state and will not voluntarily relinquish that advantage. In addition, the allied resistance organizations based in Hokuriku may not necessarily accept the deal. After some thought, and despite fears of betrayal, Yatagarasu ultimately decides to join the alliance. After a public signing ceremony, the alliance officially announces their intention to form the autonomous state of New Japan, inviting the Japanese government to administer it. Meanwhile, Brad begins making his own plans, much to his subordinate Sofia's concern, as she feels he's changed ever since he obtained Ghost. Spears orders to German to eliminate the alliance by any means necessary. Back in New Japan, Alexei reports that the NAC wants to hold a preliminary meeting, of which he will attend, and announces that the NAC also specifically requested Amō attend as well.
21	"Signs of Upheaval"; Transliteration: "Dōran no Kizashi" (Japanese: 動乱の兆し)	Akira Toba	Misaki Morie	Kia Asamiya	May 31, 2022
Amō and Alexei arrive in Tokyo on behalf of the newly formed New Japan Cooperation Organization to negotiate with the NAC. However, the mediator for the meeting, Congressman Roy Walker, is shot and wounded by a sniper. Amō and Alexei are detained by the NAC while they attempt to investigate the incident. Brad takes the opportunity to meet Amō personally, and Amō immediately suspects that he is in league with German. Meanwhile, it is revealed that German was responsible for the shooting, and he begins planting false rumors that the NJCO was responsible, giving Spears the pretext he needs to mobilize his troops again. Sofia voices her concerns about Brad's plans to Raymond, who agrees to help her investigate. The NAC attempts to invade the Asian territory, but are repelled thanks to Gashin intervening with an upgraded Jogan. Brad then meets with Amō and Alexei again, warning them that having been handed a humiliating defeat at the hands of the NCJO, the NAC will likely detain them indefinitely as hostages. However, Brad leaves behind security cards to allow the pair to escape.
22	"Fugitives"; Transliteration: "Tōbōsha" (Japanese: 逃亡者)	Masashi Abe	Noboru Kimura	Michio Murakawa	June 7, 2022
With NAC forces in pursuit of them, Amō and Alexei flee into the wilderness as they try to reach the safety of New Japan. Meanwhile Yatagarasu sends a rescue force consisting of Masaki and Dahlia to make contact with them until Shion is ready to deploy in Reiki. NAC forces soon surround Amō and Alexei, but Shion, Masaki, and Dahlia arrive just in time to distract the NAC forces. As Alexei is evacuated from the area, Amō begins to board Kenbu, but Masaki is killed protecting Dahlia from enemy fire. Angered by the death of their comrade, Amō and Shio rout the remaining NAC forces and they retreat. While the mission is a failure, Spears points out that with the escape of NCJO delegation and the battle that took place, the NAC has more than enough justification to stage an invasion of New Japan. Brad looks forward to the battle, eager to test his newly finished Brady Ghost AMAIM. Back in New Japan, everybody in Yatagarasu is despondent at the loss of Masaki.
23	"Outbreak of War"; Transliteration: "Kaisen" (Japanese: 開戦)	Takahiro Tamano	Misaki Morie	Takeshi Mori; Takahiro Tamano	June 14, 2022
Amō and Alexei return to New Japan, and the NCJO immediately begins their plans to defend against the NAC's inevitable assault. However, the odds are heavily against them due to the NAC's superior numbers and more advanced tactical AIs, so Maki begins work on upgrading the NCJO's tactical AIs. Meanwhile, Dialo and his men leave New Japan to hunt down German, but their initial attempt fails and German manages to elude them. The NAC's Command in Chief Freeman arrives in Japan to lead the NAC offensive, while Public Security warns Sofia to stop investigating Brad, as she risks blowing the cover of their own investigation. Public Security also captures men associated with Brad and German. Back in New Japan, Amō, Gashin, and Shion decide to spend the day visiting a nearby shrine so they can have an opportunity to relax before the battle. The next day, the NAC begins to mobilize, but Sofia is transferred out of Brad's unit at the last second. The leaders of both sides give rousing speeches to their troops, and the NAC officially begins their attack on New Japan.
24	"Hokuriku Frontline (Part 1)"; Transliteration: "Hokuriku Sensen (Zenpen)" (Japanese: 北陸戦線（前編）)	Shōji Ikeno	Noboru Kimura	Susumu Nishizawa	June 21, 2022
The battle for New Japan begins as the NAC sends in their forces to attack. The NJCO forces fight back, and manage to force a stalemate in the early stages of the battle. Meanwhile, German watches the battle from a distance when Dialo tracks him down, and the two engage in a gun battle. Amō, Gashin, and Shion each hold their own areas on the defense line until Brad appears in his Ghost unit and attacks Amō. Gashin and Shion attempt to go reinforce Amō, but they are pinned down by NAC reinforcements. Amō realizes Brad is piloting Ghost and asks if he ordered the attack on TRYVECTA, to which Brad claims he did, enraging Amō. The two battle but Brad looks to have the upper hand until Gai realizes that Brad disabled his cockpit safety systems to improve his performance. Even though Ghost inflicts more damage on Kenbu, Brad gets injured with Ghost's every move. However, the tide begins to turn on the rest of the battle as the NAC begins to overwhelm the NJCO's defense lines. Amō is finally able to temporarily disable Ghost, but Kenbu shuts down before he can land a finishing blow.
25	"Hokuriku Frontline (Part 2)"; Transliteration: "Hokuriku Sensen (Kōhen)" (Japanese: 北陸戦線（後編）)	Nobuyoshi Habara	Noboru Kimura	Kia Asamiya; Nobuyoshi Habara	June 28, 2022
Brad moves to deliver the finishing blow to Amō, but Kenbu reactivates thanks to Kei and Nayuta dedicating most of their processing power to Gai. Brad and Amō continue to fight as the battle rages on. Dialo is able to apprehend German, while Maki gets the idea to base the NCJO tactical AIs off of Gai, Kei, and Nayuta, similar to how the NAC AIs are based on Ghost. The NCJO AMAIMs receive a massive power boost and begin pushing back the NAC. Eventually, Amō gains the upper hand on Brad and inflicts critical damage to Ghost, destroying it along with Brad, but Gai is deleted due to the damage Kenbu suffered. At the NAC, Spears is arrested by Public Security, and the NAC forces withdraw. In the aftermath, with German in custody and Spears' corruption exposed, the NAC decides to enter into peace negotiations with NCJO to formally recognize New Japan. Brad is revealed to have survived, and admits to Sofia that he had been secretly working with Public Security to investigate Spears, and Sofia reveals Ghost activated Brad's ejection seat, saving his life. In New Japan, Amō, Gashin, and Shion decide to go their separate ways for the time being to enjoy the peace. Amō is given a new AI based on Gai's remaining code, and decides to raise and teach him. With Gai at his side, Amō begins traveling across Japan to revisit all of the people he has helped and encountered during his journey.

=== Original net animation ===
An original net animation spinoff series titled Amaim Warrior at the Borderline: UltraSteel Ogre-Gear (Japanese: 境界戦機 極鋼ノ装鬼, Hepburn: Kyōkai Senki Kyokkō no Sōki) is also produced by Sunrise Beyond and premiered on Bandai Spirits' YouTube Channel on April 10, 2023. Masami Obari directed the series alongside returning staff from the previous anime handling the writing (Noboru Kimura), music (Rasmus Faber) and mecha designs (Ippei Gyōbu, Kanetake Ebikawa, and Takayuki Yanase).

The opening theme is "Yobukoeganaruhougakue" by Organic Call. The ending theme is "I'll Be There" by Linkl Planet.

== Reception ==
Anime News Network felt the main protagonist was generally unoriginal and uninspired. They were also critical of the story, calling its political aspects poorly-executed. In their review, Anime Feminist felt that the anime contains content of nationalism and anti-immigration ideas. They felt the introduction part of the anime's first episode can be summarized as "we let foreigners in and they outbred us, and now the True Japanese People are being subjugated by the foreign powers they heralded".

=== Bilibili removal ===
Chinese streaming website Bilibili removed the series from its service due to the portrayal of Asian foreign powers as human traffickers in the fifth episode, "Determination".
