= Just Because! =

Japanese anime television series

- First Blu-ray Disc volume cover, featuring Mio Natsume
- Genre: Romantic drama; Slice of life
- Created by: FOA
- Anime television series
- Directed by: Atsushi Kobayashi
- Produced by: Keisuke Fukunaga; Takema Okamura; Yūma Ōgami; Shinji Ōmori; Hirotaka Kaneko
- Written by: Hajime Kamoshida
- Music by: Nagi Yanagi; Erika Fukusawa
- Studio: Pine Jam
- Licensed by: NA: Sentai Filmworks; SEA: Muse Communication
- Original network: AT-X, Tokyo MX, tvk, MBS, BS Fuji
- Original run: October 5, 2017 – December 28, 2017
- Episodes: 12
- Serial novel
- Written by: Hajime Kamoshida
- Illustrated by: Atsushi Kobayashi
- Published by: Kadokawa
- Imprint: Media Works Bunko
- Magazine: Da Vinci
- Published: November 11, 2017
- Volumes: 1
- icon

Just Because! is a Japanese anime television series created by Hajime Kamoshida, with character design by Kiseki Himura. It was produced by Pine Jam. The series aired from October to December 2017.

== Characters ==
=== Main ===
Eita Izumi (泉 瑛太, Izumi Eita)
Voiced by: Aoi Ichikawa (Japanese); Greg Cote (English)
A transfer student who come back to his hometown after four years. Because his father's job was often relocated, Eita often transfers to different schools. He was in baseball club along with Haruto during middle school. He has had a crush on Mio since middle school but could not confess to her.
Mio Natsume (夏目 美緒, Natsume Mio)
Voiced by: Karin Isobe (Japanese); Luci Christian (English)
The former student council president. Mio was Eita and Haruto's classmate during middle school. She plans to enroll in college and is studying hard to make it happen. Her unrequited feelings for Haruto since middle school still influence her, but as the series progresses, her feelings begin to change.
Haruto Sōma (相馬 陽斗, Sōma Haruto)
Voiced by: Taishi Murata (Japanese); Blake Shepard (English)
A baseball team member who has already secured a job after graduation. He and Eita are childhood friends. He has a crush on Hazuki and confesses his feelings but is rejected at first; however this changes over the series. Hazuki tells Haruto she won't date him until she is settled in college and Haruto finds a stable job and if he still loves her by that time.
Hazuki Morikawa (森川 葉月, Morikawa Hazuki)
Voiced by: Yuna Yoshino (Japanese); Patricia Duran (English)
Hazuki is a trumpet player from the school concert band and has already decided on her preferred college. She does not stand out in class, and seems uninterested in romantic relationships. Haruto has a crush on her and confesses his feelings but is rejected at first. However, over the course of the series, this changes. Hazuki tells Haruto she won't date him until she is settled in college, Haruto finds a stable job and if his feelings remain unchanged.
Ena Komiya (小宮 惠那, Komiya Ena)
Voiced by: Lynn (Japanese); Brittney Karbowski (English)
Ena is a second-year student, and a member of the photography club is close to being disbanded. In order to save the club, she enters a photography competition. Later on, she develops a crush on Eita. She has a go-getter attitude, taking active steps to get what she wants, speaking her mind openly where everyone else is too nervous to speak up.

=== Others ===
Yoriko Inui (乾 依子, Inui Yoriko)
Voiced by: Arisa Sakuraba (Japanese); Cat Thomas (English)
Hazuki's best friend who constantly looks after her, speaks out on her behalf and helps her and Haruto get together. At one point she admits to Hazuki she's also in love with someone, but refuses to say more.
Sanae Takahashi (高橋 早苗, Takahashi Sanae)
Voiced by: Yuka Nukui (Japanese); Christina Kelly (English)
Mio's best friend.
Momoka Suzuki (鈴木 桃花, Suzuki Momoka)
Voiced by: Reina Kondō (Japanese); Stephanie Wittels (English)
Mio's best friend.
Mayuko Satō (佐藤 真由子, Satō Mayuko)
Voiced by: Sayaka Senbongi (Japanese); Skyler Sinclair (English)
Mio's best friend who hates Hazuki.
Junpei Saruwatari (猿渡 順平, Saruwatari Junpei)
Voiced by: Kōhei Amasaki (Japanese); Adam Gibbs (English)
Haruto's best friend.
Rikuto Ishigaki (石垣 陸生, Ishigaki Rikuto)
Voiced by: Shōta Yamamoto (Japanese); Andrew Love (English)
Haruto's best friend.
Tōru Shimizu (清水 徹, Shimizu Tōru)
Voiced by: Junichi Yanagita (Japanese); Scott Gibbs (English)
A second-year student and a member of the photography club.
Kaoru Yamaguchi (山口 薫, Yamaguchi Kaoru)
Voiced by: Daiki Kobayashi (Japanese); Mike Haimoto (English)
A second-year student and a member of the photography club.
Watanabe-sensei (渡辺先生, Watanabe Sensei)
Voiced by: Tōru Okawa (Japanese); Josh Morrison (English)
The homeroom teacher of Mio and Haruto's class.

== Media ==
=== Anime ===
The project was first teased as an April's Fools joke in 2017 under title April 1st The Animation. It was later confirmed as real in the June issue of Gakken's Megami Magazine.

Kiseki Himura designed the characters, Atsushi Kobayashi directed the series with screenplay by Hajime Kamoshida. Hiroyuki Yoshii adapted Kiseki's art into animation. Keisuke Fukunaga produced the series. Pine Jam produced the animation. It aired from October 5 to December 28, 2017, on AT-X, Tokyo MX, TV Kanagawa, MBS, and BS Fuji's programming block Anime Guild. Nagi Yanagi served as music producer as well performed the opening theme titled "Over and Over", while Karin Isobe, Yuna Yoshino, and Lynn performed the ending theme "behind". Sentai Filmworks has licensed the series and streamed it on Amazon's Anime Strike service in the U.S. Sentai released the series for home video with an English dub on February 12, 2019. Muse Communication licensed the series in Southeast Asia and streamed on Muse Asia YouTube channel.

==== Episodes ====
No.	Title	Directed by	Original release date
1	"On your marks!"	Yūsuke Sunouchi	October 5, 2017
The winter at the third year of high school. Due to his father's job, Eita Izumi returns to Kanagawa when he was in middle school as a transfer student at an inconvenient time. When he wants to visit Kashiogawa High School, he meets Haruto Sōma, a middle school friend who has been out of touch since moving to Fukuoka. Even though Haruto has retired from the club, he tries to pedal a baseball bat to make home run on the field. They were awkward doing it at first. However, during the at bat practice match, they remember the familiar feeling from when they were in middle school. Haruto, who got a home run from Eita, go to confess his love. Just then, Eita gets a message his crush, Mio Natsume, is at Kashiogawa High School.
2	"Question"	Kazuomi Koga; Kōhei Hatano; Yasushi Muroya	October 12, 2017
After hitting a home run, Haruto confesses his love to Hazuki Morikawa. Haruto meets Hazuki, who was in the concert club to train her juniors. But at the last moment, Haruto hesitates and the declaration of love fails. Meanwhile, Mio Natsume and Eita Izumi meet again at the same place as Haruto. They looked at Haruto with pity. Since middle school, Eita knew Mio liked Haruto. After that, Eita, Haruto, Mio, Hazuki and Hazuki's friend, Yoriko Inui, agree to visit the aquarium. The next day while looking at the aquarium, Eita realizes Mio still likes Haruto. While returning home with complicated feelings, Eita is approached by a strange high school girl.
3	"Andante"	Tsutomu Murakami	October 19, 2017
Eita, Haruto, Mio, Hazuki and Yoriko join new Line group called "Enoshima Aquarium", then they start chatting normally. Haruto is very happy to know Hazuki's contact. At first, Hazuki is surprised to be suddenly asked to visit the aquarium, but she was happy because she felt like a high school student. Yoriko, who knows Haruto's feelings, enjoys every reaction. Eita's feelings are complicated before knowing Mio's feelings. Then, Mio sends Line account to Eita. At the station, Mio meets Ena Komiya, a second-year student who suddenly calls after Mio wants to go home from the aquarium. Ena is a second-year student from the same high school as them who is from the photography club. In order to save the photography club which is about to be disbanded, Ena wants to join a competition with Eita's photo.
4	"Full swing"	Kei Miura	October 26, 2017
Five people from the group prays for Mio's entrance exam on New Year's Eve. Haruto tell Mio and Eita he will definitely confess his love to Hazuki. At the end of the year, Eita, Mio and Yoriko visits their first shrine because Mio wants Haruto and Hazuki alone. Haruto is aware of it but not Hazuki. On the way home, Haruto confesses his love. Meanwhile, after Yoriko leaves Eita and Mio, Eita is worried about Mio's cheerful attitude and asks Haruto. Mio is still making excuses to hide her feelings and then, Eita, emotional about Mio's attitude, confesses his feelings to her.
5	"Rolling stones"	Naotaka Hayashi; Kazuomi Koga	November 2, 2017
Hazuki rejects Haruto's confession. Afterwards, Haruto tries to be strong but his feelings remains chaotic until the winter holiday ends. Eita, who has expressed his feelings for Mio, is also experiencing the same thing. The first day of the third semester begins. Meanwhile, Hazuki asks for Mio's opinion on Haruto's confession because she is worried for rejecting him immediately. Mio suggests that Hazuki express this feeling to Haruto. At night, Hazuki sends Haruto a message asking to meet again.
6	"Restart"	Tatsuya Nokimori; Kazuomi Koga; Mitsuhiro Yoneda	November 9, 2017
It has been three days since Haruto read Hazuki's message. When Haruto tells Eita he has not replied to it during their lunch break, he is challenged by Eita to an at-bat match. Eita wants Haruto to hit another home run in order to muster the confidence to contact Hazuki. Haruto is hesitant at first, but he is fired up by Eita's serious throw. Haruto finally hits a great home run. Mio, watching from afar, is amazed by Eita's seriousness and wants to put an end to her unrequited love. Mio eventually returns Haruto's old eraser.
7	"Snow day"	Yayoi Takano; Kazuomi Koga	November 23, 2017
Since the at-bat match, Eita runs every night because of his frustration. The day before Mio's visit to the Test Center, Eita sees a police car and a troubled Ena near his home. A man protests that Ena has taken the picture without his permission. When Eita escorts Ena away from the scene, she tells Eita the photography club was an important place to her. Eita agrees to Ena's photo of him and Haruto being submitted to a competition. Mio, who is going home from her cram school, sees them hugging. On the day of Mio's test, it snows heavily. The rail system is crippled, and Mio falls at the station. Eita suddenly appears and takes the confused Mio to the Test Center. Meanwhile, Mio remembers that when she was in middle school, Eita would always help her when she was in trouble.
8	"High Dynamic Range"	Sumito Sasaki	November 30, 2017
Mio, Eita, Haruto and Yoriko attend a party at Hazuki's house. Mio starts to care about Eita. While returning from the Test Center, Mio becomes worried about what Ena said about asking Eita out on a date. On Sunday, Eita and Ena meets Mio while they are travelling to their destination by train. Eita thinks Mio is going to her cram school, but Mio follows them and seems annoyed. Ena does not know what is going on and the situation becomes even more uneasy. Mio finally alights from the train. Eita arrives at Enoshima with Ena and they look like they are dating.
9	"Answer"	Kazuomi Koga; Mitsuhiro Yoneda	December 7, 2017
While returning from a supposed date, Ena tells Eita she will confess her love for him if she wins the photography competition. In school, they feel awkward. Meanwhile, Hazuki wants to express her feelings for Haruto. But before that, Hazuki wants to know Mio's feelings because she detected Mio's unrequited love when she saw Mio return the eraser to Haruto. Mio reveals to Hazuki there is someone else she really likes. Hazuki suggests that Mio confess her feelings. Mio is more confident in joining the university she has been thinking about.
10	"Childhood's end"	Yūta Takamura; Naotaka Hayashi	December 14, 2017
Mio tells her sister Mina that she will not join Suizan University, the same one Mina attended. Mina is happy to learn about it. On Valentine's Day, Hazuki invites Haruto to a baseball field. Hazuki plays her trumpet while Haruto goes through the motions of hitting a home run. Hazuki responds to Haruto's declaration of love again, saying she cannot be his girlfriend. In spring, Hazuki starts attending college in Hyōgo and Haruto starts working, so it will be hard for them. Haruto persists and to his surprise, Hazuki says she wants them to settle down first and she will agree Haruto's girlfriend when the time comes. Meanwhile, Mio wants to give chocolate to Eita but she cannot do it after seeing his cellphone wallpaper. The wallpaper is a photo of Ena saved as a prank by Ena, to Eita's annoyance. Mio, who does not know about it, immediately runs away. It is not long before Mio realizes the feelings she has for Eita is so real.
11	"Roundabout"	Kazuomi Koga; Yūsuke Sunouchi	December 21, 2017
Mio decides to reveal her feelings to Eita after she passes the Joei University entrance exam. Likewise, Eita wants to express his feelings for her after he passes the Suizan University entrance exam; he has chosen what he believes is Mio's first choice. However, Mio has changed it to Joei University, which has already accepted Eita. Eita and Mio separately focus on their exams without knowing this. They do not meet again until Graduation Day. Meanwhile, Ena learns the results of the photography contest.
12	"Get set, go!"	Atsushi Kobayashi; Erkin Kawabata; Mitsuhiro Yoneda	December 28, 2017
Mio passes the entrance exam for Joei University. Graduation day arrives in early spring. Mio wants to talk to Eita in school after the graduation ceremony, but she cannot find him. In the photography club room, Eita tells Ena he is happy to receive her confession to him, but he likes someone else. After he leaves, Ena starts crying. Mio leaves a message that she will wait for Eita on a hill. Eita actually knows there has been a message from Mio, but he will not read it. Eita has failed entrance exam for Suizan University, so he thinks he does not deserve to meet Mio. Haruto meets Eita and Eita tries to win the at-bat match between them. Eita finally hits the ball as far as he can, but arrives too late to meet Mio on the hill. A month later, Eita meets Mio at Joei University where they reveal their feelings for each other.

=== Novel ===
A serialized novel adaptation of the anime was launched in Kadokawa's Da Vinci magazine starting October 2017 issue (released on September 6). The first chapter tells the prologue anime's plot. Atsushi Kobayashi illustrated the cover for the novel.

No.	Release date	ISBN
1	November 25, 2017	978-4-04-893384-1

=== Web manga ===
A series of two-page-long manga chapters, illustrated by different authors, were published on the anime's official Twitter account from October 6 to December 10, 2017. A collected doujinshi volume, which included a special Drama CD, was distributed at Comiket 93 from December 29–31, 2017.
