= Gleipnir (manga) =

Japanese manga series by Sun Takeda

- First tankōbon volume cover

グレイプニル (Gureipuniru)
- Genre: Action; Dark fantasy; Supernatural thriller
- Manga
- Written by: Sun Takeda
- Published by: Kodansha
- English publisher: NA: Kodansha USA
- Imprint: Young Magazine Comics
- Magazine: Young Magazine the 3rd (2015–2021); Monthly Young Magazine (2021–2023)
- Original run: October 6, 2015 – April 20, 2023
- Volumes: 14
- Anime television series
- Directed by: Kazuhiro Yoneda
- Produced by: Takaya Ibira; Shin Furukawa; Adam Zehner
- Written by: Shinichi Inotsume
- Music by: Ryōhei Sataka
- Studio: Pine Jam
- Licensed by: Crunchyroll (Note: While Crunchyroll handles distribution in North America, Madman Anime distributes the series in Australia and Wakanim in Europe.): SEA: Medialink
- Original network: Tokyo MX
- Original run: April 5, 2020 – June 28, 2020
- Episodes: 13
- icon

Gleipnir (Japanese: グレイプニル, Hepburn: Gureipuniru) is a Japanese manga series written and illustrated by Sun Takeda. It was serialized in Kodansha's seinen manga magazine Young Magazine the 3rd from October 2015 to April 2021, and later transferred to Monthly Young Magazine, where it ran from May 2021 to April 2023. Its chapters were collected in fourteen tankōbon volumes. The manga was licensed by Kodansha USA in North America. A 13-episode anime television series adaptation by Pine Jam aired from April to June 2020.

== Plot ==
High school student Shuichi Kagaya receives the ability to transform into a giant monstrous dog. It resembles a mascot costume with a zipper on the back and a big smile on the front. He meets a normal girl from the same class, Claire Aoki, whose sister, Elena, was responsible for killing their parents.

== Characters ==
Shuichi Kagaya (加賀谷 修一, Kagaya Shuichi)
Voiced by: Natsuki Hanae, Natsumi Fujiwara (young) (Japanese); Ry McKeand (English)
A nervous high school boy with amnesia he himself is not aware of. He is capable of turning into a giant mascot costume resembling a dog, with a functioning gun that appears alongside him as well. Whenever any female people enter said mascot costume, they can share memories with Shuichi, and the mascot form's strength and speed is heightened. At some point in the past, Shuichi was in a romantic relationship with Elena, but he has no memory of this due to his amnesia.
Claire Aoki (青木 紅愛, Aoki Kurea) (Note: Also romanized as "Clair".)
Voiced by: Nao Tōyama (Japanese); Brittney Karbowski (English)
A high school girl. She attempts suicide when no one believed her. After meeting Shuichi, she gets obsessed with finding Elena and the truth behind the creation of monsters. At first, she abuses Shuichi, but cares about him to the point she swore to kill herself should he die first so they can stay together. Behind her personality, Claire possesses a determination to kill anyone without hesitation or remorse, and close herself off from her emotions to an extent that Shuichi finds terrifying. Claire is physically weak, but when she is inside Shuichi, she controls his body movement, and receives a massive boost to physical capability and superhuman level. She later uses a coin to gain the power to slow down her perception of time increasing her speed and reflexes. It is revealed that Clair and Elena are paternal half-sisters, due to Claire being born from an affair, between her father and one of his mistresses.
Elena Aoki (青木 江麗奈, Aoki Erena)
Voiced by: Kana Hanazawa (Japanese); Morgan Laure (English)
Claire's sister. After receiving the ability to transform into a ghost, she killed her parents, seemingly for the hypocritical manner they acted while the sisters had strict rules. She loves Claire dearly and may be the only person she is unwilling to harm. Emotionally unstable and psychotic even before becoming a monster she has, according to Shuichi after he scented her clothing, committed a staggering number of murders. Elena is revealed to be Shuichi's ex-girlfriend and the one who turned him into a monster. The idea that anyone else might be inside Shuichi makes Elena upset. She removes his head and finds Claire inside him, and he survives due to some unknown ability of his monster form to keep him alive after experiencing injuries.
Alien (宇宙人, Uchūjin)
Voiced by: Takahiro Sakurai (Japanese); Kyle Igneczi (English)
A member of a highly advanced alien species with the ability to grant a limited wish in exchange for golden coins containing one of his fellow aliens. Should anyone locate all coins he has even offered to grant the person enough power to do almost anything, even destroy a planet should they wish, seemingly regardless for how such a power may be abused.
Nana Mifune (三船 奈々, Mifune Nana)
Voiced by: Miku Itō (Japanese); Xanthe Huynh (English)
Another high school girl. She is cheerful, enough so Shuichi once felt better about himself. It is suggested she has a crush on Shuichi as she was the one to notice how depressed he was while everyone thought he just seemed well.
Abukawa (アブカワ)
Voiced by: Yoshiaki Hasegawa (Japanese); Nicholas Andrew Louie (English)
Shuichi's classmate.
Hikawa (氷川)
Voiced by: Shizuka Ishigami (Japanese); Dawn M. Bennett (English)
One of the Gatherers and a selfish student. She uses a coin to ask the Alien for increased speed in order to excel at sports, but dislikes her abilities after it transformed her arms and legs into monster limbs.
Tadanori Sanbe (三部 忠則, Sanbe Tadanori)
Voiced by: Hiroki Yasumoto (Japanese); Kamran Nikhad (English)
A university student and the first monster siding with Claire and Shuichi. Having found a coin he asked the Alien to make him stronger than anyone else. A martial artist, he created his style to utilize the strength of his body, but finding humans no longer challenged him he has decided to defeat monsters.
Chihiro Yoshioka (吉岡 ちひろ, Yoshioka Chihiro)
Voiced by: Kana Ichinose (Japanese); Michelle Marie (English)
One of Koyanagi's allies, a girl with fox ears and the ability to understand animals.
Ikeuchi (池内)
Voiced by: Shōya Chiba (Japanese); Daman Mills (English)
One of Koyanagi's allies. A notorious coward, he is easily controlled and manipulated by others, especially those he is afraid of. He is in love with Chihiro, but is fearful. His monster ability lets him transform his head into a surveillance camera, which he uses to follow and record a video. Any recording he makes he can upload to computers or wirelessly online.
Subaru (スバル)
Voiced by: Yō Taichi (Japanese); Suzie Yeung (English)
A very powerful Gatherer and Elena's friend. He despises being told what to do and enjoys killing people who try, except for Elena. Subaru summons and controls two large monsters, a male on the left side and a female on the right, calling them his Parents. They are immensely strong and do all by fighting for him, while he is kept safe between their hands.

== Media ==
=== Manga ===
Written and illustrated by Sun Takeda, Gleipnir was serialized in Kodansha's seinen manga magazine Young Magazine the 3rd from October 6, 2015, to April 6, 2021. It was transferred to Monthly Young Magazine, where it ran from May 20, 2021, to April 20, 2023. Kodansha collected its chapters in fourteen tankōbon volumes, released from March 18, 2016, to July 20, 2023.

In North America, Kodansha USA announced it had licensed the manga for English release in July 2018. The fourteen volumes were released from March 19, 2019, to March 19, 2024.

==== Volumes ====
No.	Original release date	Original ISBN	English release date	English ISBN
1	March 18, 2016	978-4-06-382752-1	March 19, 2019	978-1-63236-763-1
2	October 20, 2016	978-4-06-382868-9	May 28, 2019	978-1-63236-764-8
3	April 20, 2017	978-4-06-382957-0	July 23, 2019	978-1-63236-791-4
4	November 20, 2017	978-4-06-510308-1	October 15, 2019	978-1-6323-6835-5
5	June 20, 2018	978-4-06-511455-1	November 19, 2019	978-1-6323-6836-2
6	March 19, 2019	978-4-06-514803-7	February 18, 2020	978-1-6323-6909-3
7	December 20, 2019	978-4-06-518417-2	August 18, 2020	978-1-64651-014-6
8	April 6, 2020	978-4-06-519203-0	November 4, 2020	978-1-64651-042-9
9	November 19, 2020	978-4-06-521341-4	June 22, 2021	978-1-64651-199-0
10	May 20, 2021	978-4-06-523320-7	December 14, 2021	978-1-64651-359-8
11	December 20, 2021	978-4-06-526170-5	July 12, 2022	978-1-64651-397-0
12	June 20, 2022	978-4-06-528135-2	January 10, 2023	978-1-64651-637-7
13	January 19, 2023	978-4-06-530415-0	September 12, 2023	978-1-64651-696-4
14	July 20, 2023	978-4-06-532377-9	March 19, 2024	979-8-88877-042-9

=== Anime ===
An anime television series adaptation was announced in March 2019. The series is animated by Pine Jam and directed by Kazuhiro Yoneda, with Shinichi Inotsume handling series composition, and Takahiro Kishida designing the characters. Ryōhei Sataka composes the series' music. It aired from April 5 to June 28, 2020, on Tokyo MX and other channels. Hikaru performed the series' opening theme song "Altern-ate-", while international music group Mili performed its ending theme song "Ame to Taieki to Nioi".

Funimation (later branded as Crunchyroll) has acquired the series globally, excluding Asia and streams the series on FunimationNow, AnimeLab and Wakanim. In Southeast Asia and South Asia, the series is licensed by Medialink, which streams it on the Ani-One YouTube channel in South Asia and select Southeast Asian countries, and on the streaming service Dimsum in Singapore, Malaysia, and Brunei. On December 12, 2020, Funimation announced the series would receive a dub with a two-episode premiere the next day. The Gleipnir DVD and Blu-Ray set were released in North America on July 6, 2021.

==== Episodes ====
No.	Title (Note: All English titles are taken from Funimation.)	Directed by	Written by	Original release date
1	"Something Inside of Me"; Transliteration: "Boku no Naka niwa" (Japanese: 僕の中には)	Kazuhiro Yoneda	Shinichi Inotsume	April 5, 2020
A strange, shadowy figure puts a coin in a vending machine. A man steps out, thanks the person, and offers her a wish. Six months later, high school boy Shuichi Kagaya is tormented by his strange ability to transform into a giant dog mascot costume, which comes equipped with a working gun. He has no knowledge of how he came to be in his situation, and slowly becomes more distant from his peers. One day, he finds a girl setting a warehouse ablaze with her inside. After saving her via his mascot form, Shuichi leaves her, inadvertently leaving his phone behind. The next day at the pool, Shuichi runs into the girl again, who has stolen his phone and taken a photo of his mascot form. The girl introduces herself as Clair, and threatens to upload the photo to the internet if Shuichi does not assist her. As the two go to Clair's apartment and Clair prepares to explain her motives, the two are ambushed and attacked by a strange masked girl. When she grows bonelike appendages around her arms and legs, she begins to attack Shuichi and Clair.
2	"What It Means to Be Empty"; Transliteration: "Karappo no Imi" (Japanese: 空っぽの意味)	Directed by : Katsuya Shigehara; Storyboarded by : Katsuya Shigehara, Ryoma Ebata	Natsuko Takahashi	April 12, 2020
Sometime prior to the events of the series, a girl named Hikawa (who would later attack Shuichi and Clair) finds a coin in the forest. Inserting it into a vending machine, she bargains with the man who steps out and wishes to be better at sports. While her wish is granted, she soon grows bonelike appendages and becomes reclusive, determined to find another coin to revert the transformation. In the present day, Shuichi and Clair escape from Hikawa, and leave the apartment. As they are relentlessly pursued, Clair realizes that there is a zipper on the back of Shuichi's mascot form and unzips it, revealing his insides to be completely hollow. When she steps inside, she learns that by doing so she gains a telepathic connection with Shuichi and increases his strength. When Hikawa finally finds them, the three fight, until Clair forces Shuichi to break Hikawa's leg and kill her. A few days later, Shuichi is traumatized by the events, but Clair is nonplussed. After the two return to a warehouse to discuss the situation, Clair reveals that she wants to die alongside Shuichi and attempts to kill herself, before she is rescued by Shuichi's mascot form. The episode ends with a flashback to the past, revealing that Clair's sister bargained with the strange man in the vending machine at some point, and had a bag charm resembling Shuichi's mascot form.
3	"Elena"; Transliteration: "Erena" (Japanese: エレナ)	Directed by : Hiroki Nakanishi; Storyboarded by : Yoshiaki Kyogoku	Rinrin	April 19, 2020
In Clair's apartment, her and Shuichi practice controlling the mascot form in preparation for finding Clair's sister Elena, which had been Clair's driving motive for blackmailing Shuichi. Though Shuichi initially believes that Elena may be innocent due to a lack of proof, upon sniffing her school uniform he realizes she is responsible for hundreds of murders. Shuichi and Clair embark on a stakeout, tracing Elena's scent throughout the town, and eventually catch her leaving a train station. Upon confronting her, Elena turns into a giant ghostlike creature and attacks the two, but upon seeing the mascot form she becomes strangely calm and placid, taking Shuichi and Clair to a distant location and permitting them to kill her. However, when she hears Clair's voice inside the suit, she becomes angered and rips the suit's head off.
4	"I Wish I Was Someone Else"; Transliteration: "Henshin Ganbō" (Japanese: 変身願望)	Directed by : Ryota Aikei; Storyboarded by : Ryota Aikei, Kazuhiro Yoneda	Masahiro Okubo	April 26, 2020
Realizing that the voice inside the suit is her sister, Elena gives Clair another coin and directs her to the vending machine, where she can get the necessary means to heal Shuichi. When Clair and Shuichi head to the vending machine, they encounter the Alien, a member of a shapeshifting race from a distant planet who came to Earth for colonization purposes. Upon landing, however, the Alien's ship crashed and scattered his companions, who had taken the form of coins, around the surrounding area. The Alien now employs people as "Gatherers" with the purpose of getting the coins back, promising them wishes in return for their services. Shuichi is given a potion that reconnects his head, escaping his fate with merely a scar on his neck, but both Clair and Shuichi remain suspicious of him. The next day, they plan to find the spaceship, with the purpose of gathering more coins.
5	"Crazy Enemies"; Transliteration: "Yabai Teki" (Japanese: ヤバイ敵)	Directed by : Sho Kitamura; Storyboarded by : Masao Kawase, Kazuhiro Yoneda	Masahiro Okubo	May 3, 2020
Heading to the mountains, Clair and Shuichi suddenly sense an extremely powerful monster. The creature reveals itself to be a giant skeletal humanoid with bladed arms, who attacks Shuichi and Clair in a one-sided battle. As Shuichi and Clair slowly lose strength, the monster reveals that most Gatherers tend to get into death matches to prevent the others from finding the spaceship, and that he plans to follow the same path. He also reveals that his name is Tadanori Sanbe, and he used the coins to wish for immense strength. Eventually, Clair exits the suit when Sanbe is distracted and threatens him with the suit's gun. When Sanbe realizes that Clair's body mass would cause her to break her bones if she used the gun due to its size, he transforms into his human form and surrenders. The three decide to form a team, but are suddenly attacked by a horrifically deformed and sociopathic Gatherer named Sudo. However, Sanbe kills Sudo, while Shuichi and Sanbe contemplate what to do. Clair steals Sudo's phone and finds photos of more Gatherers.
6	"Gatherers"; Transliteration: "Shūshūsha" (Japanese: 収集者)	Directed by : Yoshinobu Kasai, Kazuhiro Yoneda; Storyboarded by : Hiroyuki Morita	Natsuko Takahashi	May 10, 2020
Clair contacts one of the Gatherers on Sudo's phone, asking him if she can join his group. Eventually, the person Clair contacted, a teen named Ikeuchi, invites her to him and his group's base in the mountains, where they discuss the coin system and the group's powers. Clair eventually reveals that she and Shuichi are two separate people, and is invited to a backroom by the group's leader, a young woman named Sayaka, to prove Clair and Shuichi's allegiance to the group. In the backroom, Sayaka attempts to initiate a sexual interaction with Clair, who remains nonplussed and tries to get information about Elena. Meanwhile, Shuichi begins to bond with Chihiro, a member of the group who can sense animal emotions (and by extension, those of Shuichi).
7	"Metamorphosis"; Transliteration: "Henkei" (Japanese: 変形)	Directed by : Takashi Ando; Storyboarded by : Kazueki Mitaka, Kazuhiro Yoneda	Rinrin	May 17, 2020
Koyanagi reveals she is Elena's former classmate. Shuichi finds Subaru and retrieves Chihiro's wallet. Koyanagi sends Yota and Claire to find the two. As Subaru wounds Shuichi and Chihiro, they regret their weaknesses and fuse themselves into a single monster. Shuichi and Chihiro lose their individual selves, and fuse into a single personality. Elena stops the fight. With their minds separated, they fall unconscious. As Elena and Subaru leave, Shuichi and Chihiro revert to separate bodies.
8	"Shadows in Memory"; Transliteration: "Kioku no Kage" (Japanese: 記憶の影)	Directed by : Masashi Abe; Storyboarded by : Takaomi Kanasaki	Shinichi Inotsume	May 24, 2020
Shuichi wears the hair necklace. Isao recognizes and learns that Shuichi attended the cram school, although he cannot remember it. Claire berates Chihiro for leaving them. Realizing she is upset, she warns her that she is different from Shuichi to become one with him. Shuichi discovers Abukawa burying a dog after it got hit by a car. Ikeuchi falsely accuses Shuichi for hiding it. He believes the purpose of his form can protect anyone. Chihiro calls Elena, but she explains that the power increases the abilities of two people with the same goal and it is powerful than Shuichi is aware of. The infuriated Elena reveals that she and Shuichi had different paths. Koyanagi reveals the information of the ship.
9	"Staked Claims"; Transliteration: "Gekitotsu no Māku" (Japanese: 激突のマーク)	Directed by : Kazuhiro Yoneda, Yoshinobu Kasai; Storyboarded by : Hiroyuki Morita	Masahiro Okubo	May 31, 2020
The group come across the previous fight. Opting to avoid enemy territories, Koyanagi leads them around a mountain. Chihiro feels guilty of hiding the information about a monster keeping the coins, but cannot tell the truth about Elena. Claire learns that the territory markers are the ones to turn weaker Gatherers into ambushers. They are ambushed by a giant centipede monster named Morita, who has killed the female Gatherer. Yota saves Koyanagi. After burying the member, they leave. Madoka and his group kill Morita for revenge. When Madoka sees Shuichi, he demands to know what they are.
10	"Beautiful Flower"; Transliteration: "Utsukushī Hana" (Japanese: 美しい花)	Directed by : Sho Kitamura; Storyboarded by : Fumitoshi Oizaki	Natsuko Takahashi	June 7, 2020
Madoka offers to steal the coins and grant a wish, though first one of them must die. Claire lays out the options, either one of them dies or the rest live with guilt. Before fleeing, Claire receives an escape plan for Shuichi to set Isao's nerium shrubs ablaze and kill Madoka's group. Claire tries to send Shuichi away, but he asks her for a decision. Ikeuchi abandons the group and is decapitated by the hair necklace. Koyanagi decides Claire scares her now she has seen what she can do. Claire believes she finally knows why Elena gave her another coin, she is wrought with guilt over her actions and desperately wants Claire to save her from herself.
11	"The Price of Resolve"; Transliteration: "Ketsui no Daishō" (Japanese: 決意の代償)	Directed by : Michita Shiroishi; Storyboarded by : Hiroyuki Morita	Shinichi Inotsume	June 14, 2020
Elena tries to blame the alien for everything, but he insists humans make choices. Claire worries some monsters may have survived so they can gather coins, but Koyanagi blames herself for the massacre and they separately return home. Isao is disturbed by how he accompanied Claire and Shuichi, and that he claimed that he attended cram school. Chihiro attends the same school as Shuichi. Knowing that Abukawa died at the river, Shuichi confronts the alien and demands to know why he chose a mascot costume. He agrees to offer to make him human again if he has a coin to trade, but Shuichi plans to find all coins and restore the world. Shuichi kills Taguchi, a swordsman. The alien recalls about Honoka.
12	"Where the Promise was Made"; Transliteration: "Yakusoku no Basho" (Japanese: 約束の場所)	Directed by : Takashi Ando; Storyboarded by : Hiroyuki Morita	Rinrin	June 21, 2020
Elena's group learn someone with the power of coins is guarding the ship from other Gatherers. Naoto recalls about when he and his friends attended the cram school. Months earlier, Naoto had dated Aiko, before Honoka vanished. Aiko suggested them not to find her. Kaito followed Aiko and met the alien, who told them about Honoka. Kaito killed Honoka, after learning that she buried the real Aiko. The truth reveals that Aiko killed herself and Honoka took advantage of her death. Kaito overcame the guilt and used a coin. Later, rumors spread about a female ghost forcing people to identify her. Shuichi decided if Kaito was responsible. Back in the present day, Claire finds a doll.
13	"We Two Are One"; Transliteration: "Futari de Hitotsu" (Japanese: 二人で一つ)	Directed by : Naotaka Hayashi; Storyboarded by : Kazuhiro Yoneda	Shinichi Inotsume	June 28, 2020
Shuichi requests all coins from the group and Claire investigates the house. Their hair necklaces fall off, and Koyanagi agrees to collect all coins for Elena. Elena worries if Shuichi remembers the truth and receives all coins from Chihiro. Claire shows the doll to Elena, causing Shuichi to remember. Elena tries to erase their memory, but he and Claire fight back. Elena tells Shuichi that she killed his parents. The girl appears and Shuichi almost calls her Honoka, but Elena erases their memories and the girl flees. The truth is revealed that Kaito kept all coins and guarded the ship, but by erasing Shuichi's memory. Elena ensured Shuichi was unaware of the ship, keeping him from being targeted unless he remembers. Despite being amnesiac, Shuichi swears to end the game, and goes to the forest with Claire and Sanbe.

== Reception ==
=== Previews ===
Anime News Network (ANN) had three editors review the first episode of the anime: James Beckett praised the premiere for creating "an aesthetic and a tone [that is] worth caring" and the "thoughtful approach to otherwise seedy material", highlighting the weighty and purposeful animation, the editing providing high tension in its scenes, and Shuichi being an interestingly "flawed and messy character" that's neither "boring or outright despicable," Nick Creamer praised the series' presentation of "uncomfortably hormonal adolescence" through its "terrific layouts and character designs, [its] strong sense of oppressive summer atmosphere, and [its] general quasi-horror tone" but was critical of Claire Aoki being used as a "source of pure fanservice" and "an idol of beauty and terror than a human being", concluding that: "Gleipnir is both visually enthralling and dramatically fascinating in its hormonal grindhouse way, and probably deserves at least a glance from any adventurous anime fans." The third reviewer, Theron Martin, praised the writing for keeping the series' concept from going over the top and highlighted the "dark and moody ambiance" and "strong musical score", but was unimpressed by the "character design aesthetic" and animation, concluding that: "On the whole, I can't seeing Gleipnir blowing people away with what it does, but it puts together just enough appeal that I can give it a mild recommendation."

=== Series ===
Fellow ANN editor Steve Jones placed Gleipnir at number five on his top 5 best anime list of 2020, saying while not the "tightest-written story, and [this] isn't a gold star adaptation or anything," he called it "gross, uncomfortable, subversive, and sexually-charged in the best way possible", concluding that: "Although the adaptation concludes without any kind of finality, it left me eager to see how these two broken kids would continue to enable their mutual downward spiral, and I hope I'll be able to sing its praises again in the future." Allen Moody, writing for THEM Anime Reviews, said: "I'm still not sure how I feel about this. Despite Claire's callousness, Claire's and Shuichi's actions are at least ostensibly (though sometimes debatably) motivated by necessity, and a strong bond begins to develop between them (there's some interesting jealousy at times too, when Shuichi lets anyone else "inside" him.) There are numerous things left unexplained just yet (though the show is somewhat less confusing on a second viewing), but I found it all surreal, perverse, and yet weirdly fascinating."
