= List of Rascal Does Not Dream episodes =

Cover of Rascal Does Not Dream of Bunny Girl Senpai Blu-ray box set released in 2023, featuring Mai Sakurajima

Rascal Does Not Dream is a Japanese anime television series based on the light novel series written by Hajime Kamoshida and illustrated by Kēji Mizoguchi. The series is produced by CloverWorks and directed by Sōichi Masui, with scripts written by Masahiro Yokotani, character designs handled by Satomi Tamura, and music composed by Fox Capture Plan.

The series aired from October 4 to December 27, 2018, on ABC and other networks. (Note: ABC listed the series premiere on October 3, 2018, at 26:20, which is effectively October 4 at 2:20 a.m. JST.) It adapts the first five light novel volumes. The opening theme song is "Kimi no Sei" (君のせい; lit. 'Because of You'), performed by The Peggies. while the ending theme song is "Fukashigi no Karte" (不可思議のカルテ; lit. 'Mysterious Chart'), with each arc performed by Asami Seto, Yurika Kubo, Nao Tōyama, Atsumi Tanezaki, Maaya Uchida, and Inori Minase as their respective character names. The staffs and casts had reprised for all of the subsequent films and television series.

An anime film adaptation, titled Rascal Does Not Dream of a Dreaming Girl, premiered on June 15, 2019. It adapts the sixth and seventh light novel volumes.

During the Aniplex Online Fest event in September 2022, an anime sequel adapting the eighth and ninth light novel volumes was announced. It was later revealed that the sequel would consist of two films; Rascal Does Not Dream of a Sister Venturing Out, adapting the eighth volume, was released theatrically on June 23, 2023, and Rascal Does Not Dream of a Knapsack Kid, adapting the ninth volume, premiered on December 1 of that same year.

An anime adaptation of the University Student Arc (tenth volume onwards) was announced in December 2023, which was later revealed to be a television series, titled Rascal Does Not Dream of Santa Claus, aired from July 5 to September 27, 2025, on Tokyo MX and other networks. The opening theme song is "Snowdrop", performed by Conton Candy, while the ending theme song is "Suiheisen wa Boku no Furukizu" (水平線は僕の古傷; lit. 'The Horizon Is My Old Wound'), performed by Sora Amamiya, Aya Yamane, Konomi Kohara and Reina Ueda as their respective characters.

An anime film adaptation of the final two light novel volumes was announced in September 2025, titled Rascal Does Not Dream of a Dear Friend. The film premiered on October 16, 2026.

== Series overview ==
Season	Episodes	Originally released		Adapted volume(s) (Note: of the original light novel)
Season	Episodes	First released	Last released	Adapted volume(s)
1	13	October 4, 2018	December 27, 2018	1–5
Film 1		June 15, 2019		6–7
Film 2		June 23, 2023		8
Film 3		December 1, 2023		9
2	13	July 5, 2025	September 27, 2025	10–13
Film 4		October 16, 2026		14–15

== Episodes ==
=== Rascal Does Not Dream of Bunny Girl Senpai (2018) ===
No. overall	No. in season	Title	Directed by	Storyboarded by	Original release date	Ref.
1	1	"My Senpai is a Bunny Girl"; Transliteration: "Senpai wa Banī Gāru" (Japanese: 先輩はバニーガール)	Kazuya Iwata	Sōichi Masui	October 4, 2018	
On May 29, Sakuta Azusagawa wakes up from a hazy dream and finds a journal which describes how, on May 6, he met a senior from school wearing a bunny girl costume in the Fujisawa Library. Her name, however, has been mysteriously erased from the journal. Mai Sakurajima, a teen celebrity and actress, had gone to the library wearing said costume that day to test if people there could still see her. When Sakuta noticed her presence, she advised him to forget her once he left. While on hiatus from her career, she enters the same high school as Sakuta midway through the year, after the students have already formed their social circles. To maintain the status quo, no one has befriended her and her existence remains largely ignored. However, she has lately realized through experiments that, aside from school, there were other areas where people have also become unable to acknowledge her existence. Those areas continue to grow and is becoming an inconvenience. Believing that she has the "Adolescence Syndrome", an urban legend about special powers that affected his sister Kaede in the past, Sakuta tries to help figure out what was happening to prevent her from disappearing completely from peoples' memories.
2	2	"On First Dates, Trouble Is Essential"; Transliteration: "Hatsu Dēto ni Haran wa Tsukimono" (Japanese: 初デートに波乱は付き物)	Kazuki Horiguchi	Junichi Sakata	October 11, 2018	
Rio Futaba explains her understanding of Adolescence Syndrome using quantum mechanics and the Schrödinger's cat paradox. While having a discussion with Mai, Sakuta reveals he learned about Mai's conflict with her manager, who is also her mother, from reporter Fumika Nanjo. After Mai contacts Fumika, she agrees to spend a day with Sakuta but denies it is an actual "date". Before that, Sakuta gets involved in a misunderstanding with Tomoe Koga, a first-year student, over a lost child in a park. When Sakuta and Mai later hang out together, the latter makes an appointment to meet with her mother. However, Mai discovers that even her mother does not remember her. Sakuta then decides to take Mai to a faraway city in order to see if anyone still remembers her, which is unsuccessful. That night, they decide to rest in the same hotel room. When Mai is taking a bath, Sakuta contacts Yuma and Rio and discovers they still remember Mai. Sakuta and Mai sleep in the same bed and discuss whether Sakuta will eventually forget her too. Mai offers to kiss Sakuta, but the latter chooses not to.
3	3	"A World Without You"; Transliteration: "Kimi Dake ga Inai Sekai" (Japanese: 君だけがいない世界)	Masahiro Shinohara	Sōichi Masui	October 18, 2018	
The next morning, Sakuta reveals he was unable to sleep next to Mai. At school, he discovers all of his peers, including Yuma and Tomoe, the girl he previously encountered, have forgotten about Mai, as they have all slept. Rio proposes the school's atmosphere and sleeping caused the students to no longer remember her. As such, Sakuta attempts to stay awake as midterm exams approach. When he begins to lose his composure, he constantly stabs himself with a pencil and drinks energy drinks to keep himself awake. While studying with Mai on his third sleepless day, she induces him into sleeping with pills and tearfully bids him farewell, thanking him for doing his best to try to remember her as he dozes off. On the last exam day, Sakuta has forgotten about her. However, his memories of her return upon spotting a kanji they had studied together on his exam sheet, prompting him to leave the classroom. Realizing that he loves Mai, Sakuta loudly confesses his feelings outside of school. Mai soon appears to chastise him. Now recognizable to her classmates again, Mai announces the truth about Sakuta's syndrome.
4	4	"There Is No Tomorrow for a Rascal"; Transliteration: "Buta Yarō ni wa Ashita ga Nai" (Japanese: ブタ野郎には明日がない)	Shōhei Yamanaka	Hideaki Kurakawa	October 25, 2018	
On June 27, Sakuta proceeds through his day by eating lunch with Mai, who accepts his feelings for her, and later notices Tomoe being asked out by Maezawa, a member of the basketball club. However, Sakuta finds himself stuck in a time loop, which Rio attributes to the phenomenon of Laplace's demon. To break out of the loop, she suggests he try to find whoever is behaving differently, leading him to Tomoe. While hiding under a desk, Tomoe explains she is avoiding Maezawa because her best friend has a crush on him. Sakuta and Tomoe eventually fall on top of each other by accident, angering Maezawa and Mai when they spot the two. Thinking he will be stuck in another loop, Sakuta wakes up to discover it is June 28. Tomoe later proposes she and Sakuta enter a fake relationship until the start of summer break. Sakuta ultimately agrees because Tomoe's dilemma reminds him of a similar situation involving Kaede. That night, as Sakuta wonders how he is going to explain himself to Mai, she surprisingly comes to his apartment and asks why he had not come to talk about Tomoe.
5	5	"All the Lies I Have for You"; Transliteration: "Arittake no Uso o Kimi ni" (Japanese: ありったけの嘘を君に)	Norihito Takahashi	Daisuke Hiramaki	November 1, 2018	
Now pseudo-dating Tomoe, Sakuta is taken aback when she shows up to work in the same restaurant as him as a waitress. While at work, he asks Yuma if Maezawa is a good person, as he wants to know if he should be feeling guilty for him for what is happening. However, Yuma instead tells him that Maezawa tried to get into the relationship with Tomoe while having a girlfriend, and that he has spoken negatively of his past partners, making Sakuta feel better. Tomoe's reputation begins to falter as Maezawa spreads false rumors about her promiscuity while dating Sakuta. Nevertheless, the two go on dates, getting closer to one another. At Shichirigahama Station after school, Maezawa finds and taunts the pair, instigating Sakuta into fighting him. However, Sakuta ultimately humiliates him in front if everyone, and denies the rumors of himself and Tomoe by admitting that he is a virgin. When they leave the scene, Tomoe thanks Sakuta for standing up for her. Sakuta assures Tomoe that they will remain friends upon ending their relationship.
6	6	"This World You Chose"; Transliteration: "Kimi ga Eranda Kono Sekai" (Japanese: 君が選んだこの世界)	Kazuya Iwata	Kazuya Iwata	November 8, 2018	
On July 18, the day before summer break, Sakuta and Tomoe agree to end their "romantic" relationship after a date on the beach. However, Sakuta is pulled another time loop which repeats July 18 multiple times; unlike the first loop, Tomoe is unaware of the cycle. Following a conversation with Rio, he realizes Tomoe has been lying about her feelings, hence the loop. After confirming his suspicions in his fourth July 18, Sakuta takes her to Enoshima instead and confronts her, where she admits she has fallen in love with him, but he respectfully turns her down. The following day, it is June 27 once again, though with Mai kissing Sakuta on the cheek while having lunch. While going home, the two encounter a middle schooler named Shoko Makinohara shielding an abandoned cat from the rain, a doppelgänger with the same name as another girl whom Sakuta had fallen in love with when he was younger. However, the Shoko he encountered was a high schooler.
7	7	"Adolescence Paradox"; Transliteration: "Seishun wa Paradokkusu" (Japanese: 青春はパラドックス)	Ryūta Ono	Ryūta Ono	November 15, 2018	
Shoko begins to regularly visit Sakuta's house to take care of the stray kitten she found, as Sakuta agreed to take care of him for now. During a trip to the library, Sakuta talks with Rio about Shoko when he notices she has her hair up and is without her glasses. After meeting up with Mai, the couple spot Rio entering an Internet café; when Sakuta tries to call her to find her in the building, Rio answers the call, but they spot the Rio in the library without a phone. As such, they corner her and she admits that there are indeed two concurrent Rios in synchronic existence. The Rio from the library goes with them to Sakuta's apartment, where she suggests the duplication is a result of two personalities that move via quantum teleportation. The other Rio also supports the idea, but believes she knows why it happened. During a conversation with Saki, Sakuta learns that Rio has been posting risqué photos of herself on social media.
8	8	"Wash It All Away on a Stormy Night"; Transliteration: "Ōame no Yoru ni Subete o Nagashite" (Japanese: 大雨の夜にすべてを流して)	Shōhei Yamanaka	Junichi Sakata	November 22, 2018	
Rio explains she has struggled with her confidence about her body; while a part of her enjoys the attention, the other dislikes having her appearance be the cause of it, leading to the former manifesting as her clone. Realizing the other Rio was posting the images online while in the train station with Sakuta, Rio receives a threatening message from an unknown user trying to extort her and asks Sakuta to go home with her. That night, Sakuta convinces Yuma to visit and the three play with fireworks on Shichirigahama beach before making plans to visit the fireworks festival. The next day, the Rio at Sakuta's house runs away, forcing him to search for her in the rain; he finds her at school, but collapses from a cold. In the hospital, the clone of Rio confronts Sakuta about a picture they took on the beach with the other Rio and Yuma and explains she desires to no longer exist as she is jealous of the other Rio. However, Sakuta reassures Rio about being herself. She later calls her other self and agrees to go to the festival, unifying them once again.
9	9	"Sister Panic"; Transliteration: "Shisutā Panikku" (Japanese: シスターパニック)	Daisuke Tsukushi	Yoshikazu Miyao	November 29, 2018	
The new school term has begun, though Sakuta, who has been barred from going on public dates with Mai due to her agency's policies, is unable to find her. Upon spotting her on the street, he discovers she has swapped bodies with Nodoka Toyohama, an idol and Mai's younger half-sister. They agree to live with their predicament, with Mai assuming Nodoka's activities, and vice versa. As the two try to adjust to their new lives, Sakuta learns the siblings harbor a grudge toward each other because of the expectations levied on them, with Nodoka especially resentful of having to live in her older sister's shadow. During a video shoot, Nodoka collapses in what is typically a routine act for Mai, as it proves to be too overwhelming for her. Mai later gives Sakuta the key to her house and orders him not to open a certain cabinet. At Mai's house, Sakuta comments on Nodoka's effort, and while she is bathing, he approaches the cabinet.
10	10	"Complex Congratulations"; Transliteration: "Konpurekkusu Konguratchurēshon" (Japanese: コンプレックスこんぐらっちゅれーしょん)	Norihito Takahashi	Norihito Takahashi	December 6, 2018	
Sakuta finds an aluminium box inside Mai's cabinet. When he returns home, Kaede greets him in her school uniform, while Mai gives him tickets to Nodoka's idol group's upcoming concert. Although Mai excels in the performance, Nodoka is distraught when she observes her mother praising Mai, something she did not do with her. At the beach, Nodoka attempts to drown herself, before Sakuta catches her and tells her that Mai does indeed love her. Back home, Nodoka demands an explanation, so Sakuta gives her the box he found, which contains letters she wrote to Mai when they were younger; Mai explains she read and kept them to motivate her through the stress of her work. She adds Nodoka's mother has worried for her happiness as she tries to live up to expectations, urging her to pursue her own goals. As they embrace, the two revert to their original bodies. Rio proposes the phenomenon is a variation of quantum teleportation from Nodoka wanting to be like her older sister and possibly Mai's jealousy of her younger sister. Nodoka later moves in with Mai following an argument with her mother, while Mai's relationship with Sakuta goes public.
11	11	"The Kaede Quest"; Transliteration: "Kaede Kuesuto" (Japanese: かえでクエスト)	Kazuki Horiguchi	Kazuki Horiguchi	December 13, 2018	
At a press conference, Mai elaborates on Sakuta's role in her life and influencing her decision to return to acting. However, she urges the public to respect his privacy. Inspired, Kaede decides to organize a list of goals she wants to accomplish by the end of the year, which include answering the phone, going outside, and going to school. Sakuta receives a letter from the Shoko from his past. With Sakuta's help, Kaede begins to achieve each of her goals, with Mai helping her accomplish her goal of answering the phone. Confident, she is able to step outside their apartment with Sakuta's help. As the days pass, they eventually manage to go to the park, and the beach. While playing at the beach, she runs into Kotomi Kano, her childhood friend, yet she has no memories of her. Sakuta reveals that Kaede has lost her memories of her past.
12	12	"Life in a Never-Ending Dream"; Transliteration: "Samenai Yume no Tsuzuki o Ikiteiru" (Japanese: 覚めない夢の続きを生きている)	Kazuya Iwata	Kazuya Iwata	December 20, 2018	
Sakuta explains Kaede's condition to Mai and Nodoka: due to cyberbullying, Kaede started to experience dissociative amnesia. Worried about her, their mother suffered a mental breakdown, making her unable to accept what had happened to her daughter, and Sakuta received the scars on his chest. When reading a note Kotomi left for her in the book she had loaned to her, Kaede collapses as her past recollections slowly start to return, though at the risk of forgetting her current life. The Azusagawa siblings try to go to Kaede's school, but the trauma returns when Kaede spots other students. Instead, the two visit Ueno Zoo to cheer her up, with Sakuta gifting her a year-round pass to visit the zoo's panda exhibit. At night, Sakuta tricks Kaede into believing they are taking a shortcut home but instead leads her to the school. With no one around, Kaede is comforted by the trip and proclaims she is ready to attend school again. The next morning, however, Kaede's old self has returned at the price of her recent memories.
13	13	"The Dawn After an Endless Night"; Transliteration: "Akenai Yoru no Yoake" (Japanese: 明けない夜の夜明け)	Hidetoshi Takahashi	Sōichi Masui	December 27, 2018	
While visiting Kaede in the hospital, Sakuta breaks into tears and regrets his inability to save the life she just lost, causing his scars to reopen. An older Shoko soon treats his injuries. As he is bathing, she reads entries from Kaede's diary that she began writing shortly after her initial memory loss; expecting to regain her old memories and Sakuta to respond negatively, Kaede created her list of goals to provide him with happy recollections once she reverted to her past self, further devastating Sakuta. The next day, Sakuta spots a note left by Shoko before finding out both versions of her have disappeared entirely; Rio suggests Shoko was an illusion created by Sakuta. Mai frees up time to visit Sakuta at home, but storms away angrily when she finds Shoko's note. Sakuta promptly follows her to her filming location. On an impromptu date, Mai apologizes for not being there to help him through his crisis, to which he answers he is simply happy to have her by his side. As Sakuta and Kaede pack their bags at the hospital, he thanks her and she states her interest in going to school, knowing she is no longer alone.

=== Films (2019–2023) ===
No.	Title	Directed by	Screenplay by	Original release date	Ref.
1	"Rascal Does Not Dream of a Dreaming Girl"; Transliteration: "Seishun Buta Yarō wa Yumemiru Shōjo no Yume o Minai" (Japanese: 青春ブタ野郎はゆめみる少女の夢を見ない)	Sōichi Masui	Masahiro Yokotani	June 15, 2019	
Following the events of the first season, Sakuta and Mai are visited by another version of Shoko Makinohara. Her Adolescence Syndrome causes a future version of her to time-travel to Sakuta's present and warn him of a car accident.
2	"Rascal Does Not Dream of a Sister Venturing Out"; Transliteration: "Seishun Buta Yarō ha Odekake Sisuta no Yume wo Minai" (Japanese: 青春ブタ野郎はおでかけシスターの夢を見ない)	Sōichi Masui	Masahiro Yokotani	June 23, 2023	
After getting her memory back at the end of the first season, Kaede is figuring out how to return to school.
3	"Rascal Does Not Dream of a Knapsack Kid"; Transliteration: "Seishun Buta Yarō wa Ransel Girl no Yume o Minai" (Japanese: 青春ブタ野郎はランドセルガールの夢を見ない)	Sōichi Masui	Masahiro Yokotani	December 1, 2023	
Sakuta comes to terms with his mother's mental breakdown, which caused her to abandon him and his sister Kaede.

=== Rascal Does Not Dream of Santa Claus (2025) ===
No. overall	No. in season	Title	Directed by	Storyboarded by	Original release date
14	1	"Puberty Continues"; Transliteration: "Shishunki wa Owaranai" (Japanese: 思春期は終わらない)	Aika Ikeda	Sōichi Masui	July 5, 2025
Sakuta, now studying a statistical sciences course at the Kanazawa-Hakkei campus of Yokohama City University, is invited to a student orientation event on September 30 by his course mate, Takumi Fukuyama. At the event, a girl named Miori Mitou starts a conversation with Sakuta, already aware that he is Mai's boyfriend. As they leave, Miori brings up Adolescence Syndrome again. On October 3, Sakuta attends a Spanish class with Miori, as well as Uzuki Hirokawa, an idol singer enrolled in the same program. After the lecture, Uzuki's idol group colleague, Nodoka Toyohama, pulls Sakuta aside—she confesses that she and Uzuki had a disagreement about their group's future after hearing Uzuki received a solo offer. The next day, when Nodoka confronts Uzuki again after class, Uzuki apologizes for the conflict, displaying such a clear grasp of the situation that Nodoka is left speechless.
15	2	"What Flavor is the Atmosphere?"; Transliteration: "Kūki no Aji wa Nani no Aji?" (Japanese: 空気の味は何の味？)	Takashi Yasui	Takashi Yasui	July 12, 2025
On October 5, Sakuta observes Miori and Mai becoming friendly after attending an English class together. Later, he consults Rio Futaba regarding Uzuki's unusual behavior. Before his shift at the family restaurant, his sister Kaede, who also works there, shows him a commercial featuring Uzuki, who has gained sudden popularity due to her singing a cover of a popular song by Touko Kirishima in the commercial. The following day, Sakuta notices Uzuki wearing a mask and hat to conceal her face on the way to university and soon discovers the reason for the laughter directed at her. By October 18, Nodoka expresses concern to Sakuta about Uzuki's poor rehearsal the prior day. While commuting, Sakuta sees Uzuki on the same train and realizes she remains aboard past their stop. He barely reenters the train before the doors close and follows her to the final station, Misakiguchi. There, they rent bicycles and ride together. After discussing Uzuki's career, Sakuta decides to take her to the Budokan.
16	3	"Idol Song"; Transliteration: "Aidoru Songu" (Japanese: アイドルソング)	Aika Ikeda & Hidetoshi Takahashi	Sōichi Masui	July 19, 2025
On October 22, Mai waits for Sakuta to complete his shift at the family restaurant before picking him up and driving them to a concert at Zepp DiverCity in Odaiba, where Uzuki and Nodoka would be performing with their group, Sweet Bullet. They attend the concert together, and notice Uzuki lose her voice during her performance. Afterwards, the other members of Sweet Bullet learn that Uzuki began receiving solo offers immediately after her commercial aired, but their management did not consult Uzuki regarding them. On their way home from the concert, Nodoka vows to continue performing without Uzuki at their next scheduled performance in Hakkeijima Sea Paradise the following day. Sakuta attends with Kaede and her friend Kotomi—due to rain, the lighting and speakers cut off midway through Sweet Bullet's performance. At that moment, Sakuta notices Uzuki among the audience, and goes to talk to her, finding out that she had never missed a performance until she lost her voice. The audience begins to disperse after seeing Sweet Bullet perform a cappella. After encouragement from Sakuta, Uzuki goes to re-join her group on stage. The weather clears up and the speakers and lighting turn back on, allowing Sweet Bullet to complete their concert properly. After the performance, Uzuki announces that she will do a solo debut while also staying in Sweet Bullet. The day after, on October 24, Uzuki drops out of university to focus on her solo career.
17	4	"Heroism"; Transliteration: "Seigi no Mikata" (Japanese: 正義の味方)	Kosuke Kuremizu	Kosuke Kuremizu	July 26, 2025
On October 30, after meeting with their old friend Yūma Kunimi outside Katase-Enoshima Station, Sakuta and Rio take the train back to their job at a cram school near Fujisawa Station. Sakuta discusses his recent encounter with a girl dressed as a miniskirt Santa Claus, which only he was able to see. The girl called herself Touko Kirishima and claimed to be responsible for Uzuki's case of Adolescence Syndrome, as well as the case of Ikumi Akagi, Sakuta's former middle-school classmate. The following day, Takumi invites Sakuta to a Halloween dinner party at a venue near Sakuragichō Station, claiming that the girls attending are from the nursing department. Sakuta accepts after receiving permission from Mai to attend. During the event, Sakuta learns about the "#dreaming" trend, in which dreams posted on social media were increasingly becoming prophetic. Sakuta leaves the event after an awkward encounter with Saki Kamisato, Yūma's girlfriend who had also been invited. While still at Sakuragichō, he bumps into Ikumi herself. Ikumi quickly moves to save a younger girl from a lantern that was about to fall on her.
18	5	"Dissonant Notes"; Transliteration: "Fukyōwaon" (Japanese: 不協和音)	Shun Tsuchida	Sōichi Masui	August 2, 2025
The day after he witnessed her heroic act, Ikumi approaches Sakuta through intermediaries at the university campus and lets him know of a reunion of their middle-school class on November 27. Later at cram school, Sara Himeji joins one of Sakuta's lessons. After the lesson, and while taking the same elevator down as Sakuta, Sara bumps heads with Sakuta while retrieving her handkerchief. Sakuta returns home to have dinner with Mai, Kaede, Nodoka and Uzuki. Afterwards, Sakuta finds out more about the "#dreaming" trend by looking up posts on Kaede's laptop, while Mai asks Sakuta about his third year of middle school, and whether he forgives his class for what he went through. On November 6, Sweet Bullet hold a concert at the campus grounds as part of a cultural festival, which Sakuta, Mai, Kaede and Kotomi attend as visitors. Sakuta notices Ikumi at a food stall run by the Nursing program with her right arm in a cast, and knows that she failed to heed his warning. After going to talk to Ikumi again, Sakuta notices something move across Ikumi's back, underneath her clothes.
19	6	"You and I Within the Realm of Memories"; Transliteration: "Kioku Ryōiki no Kimi Toboku" (Japanese: 記憶領域の君と僕)	Takahiro Harada	Takahiro Harada	August 9, 2025
Following the sudden "poltergeist" attack, Ikumi Akagi is taken to the campus infirmary where she challenges Sakuta to recall a specific middle school event to cure her Adolescence Syndrome. Upon leaving, Sakuta meets Kotomi, who identifies Ikumi as a former high school senior and reveals rumors of Ikumi having a live-in boyfriend during her senior year. On November 8, Sakuta discovers that Miwako Tomobe, Kaede's former counselor, is part of Ikumi's volunteer group. Four days later, Miwako takes Sakuta to see Ikumi after a volunteering activity; another poltergeist attack occurs, leaving notes on Ikumi's arm before she flees upon hearing her ex-boyfriend Seiichi Takasaka's voice, who subsequently explains their relationship's dissolution to Sakuta. After another brief encounter with the miniskirt Santa Claus, Mai appears and accompanies Sakuta to his parents' apartment. There, his parents—acquainted with Ikumi's mother—provide Sakuta's salvaged middle-school yearbook, which he consults to verify the message Ikumi insisted he wrote.
20	7	"From Beyond Hilbert Space"; Transliteration: "Hiruberuto Kūkan no Kanata kara" (Japanese: ヒルベルト空間の彼方から)	Kateseyama	Kateseyama	August 16, 2025
On November 27, after his shift, Sakuta Azusagawa travels to his former high school to confront Ikumi Akagi, whom he lured there with an online post, and he correctly deducts that she is the version from an alternate reality he previously visited; this Ikumi confesses that feelings of jealousy and inadequacy consumed her after her reality's Sakuta saved Kaede from her bullies and helped many others with their problems, causing her to fail her university exams. After Sakuta persuades her to return home, she reveals a message on her leg from the original reality's Ikumi, prompting Sakuta to rush to his middle school reunion where he calls out to Ikumi, making her visible again. Ikumi explains her Adolescence Syndrome and admonishes the other attendees for their past ridicule, which leads Sakuta to boast about his life with Mai Sakurajima before departing and later advising Ikumi to move past her guilt. The next day, after Sakuta apologizes to Mai for his boasting, Ikumi delivers a warning from the other reality's Sakuta: "Find Touko Kirishima. Mai is in danger."
21	8	"Secrets and Promises"; Transliteration: "Himitsu to Yakusoku" (Japanese: 秘密と約束)	Yoshiki Kitai	Koichiro Takatsu	August 23, 2025
On December 1, the cram school principal requests Sakuta begin tutoring Sara, mirroring his recent dream. Later, he receives a call on his landline from Touko Kirishima, whom he had been trying to reach for days; she claims her only availability is the following afternoon, conflicting with plans for Mai's birthday. Undeterred, Mai drives Sakuta to a mall in Minatomirai, where he buys her a birthday ring. That afternoon, Sakuta meets Touko, who appears in normal attire and leads him to a nearby pâtisserie; over a mont blanc, she admits to jealousy of Mai but denies malicious intent. Afterward, Sakuta brings desserts to his apartment where Mai, Kaede, Nodoka, and Uzuki are celebrating, and later, Mai requests he keep Christmas Eve open for a trip to a hot springs resort in Hakone. The next day, Sakuta awakens from a dream of dating Sara on Christmas Eve, riding the Enoden together. After his shift, Sara greets him at Fujisawa Station, ecstatic to have shared the same dream; she reveals her awareness of having Adolescence Syndrome since Golden Week, challenges him to discover its nature, and hints at a heartbreak that triggered it.
22	9	"I Need You"	Takashi Yasui	Takashi Yasui	August 30, 2025
On December 9, Sakuta encounters Touko Kirishima on campus filming a music video for her song to be released on Christmas Eve; she thanks him for his help and instructs him to return for her live stream on that date. The next day at the cram school, Sakuta learns from student Toranosuke Kasai that he is Sara's neighbor and though he grew up with her and everyone treated them as a couple, he eventually realized around Golden Week that he did not actually love her after falling in love with Rio; he asks Sakuta to look after Sara. Later, at a café, Sakuta relays this to Sara, who questions how one can love someone the way he does. On December 12, Miori suggests to Sakuta that Sara enjoys being the center of male attention and envied by other girls. Two days later, during a separate tutoring session with advanced material, Sakuta fails to explain a complex math problem and calls Rio Futaba for help; after Rio succeeds, Sakuta recommends she tutor Sara instead, prompting Sara to exclaim she "wants" Sakuta before leaving abruptly. The following day, Sakuta discovers the identity of "Touko Kirishima" on his university's beauty pageant website: she is actually a third-year student named Nene Iwamizawa.
23	10	"Holy Night"; Transliteration: "Seinaru Yoru ni" (Japanese: 聖なる夜に)	Aika Ikeda	Aika Ikeda	September 6, 2025
After apologizing for her previous disruption at the cram school, Sara reveals to Sakuta that her Adolescence Syndrome manifests as clairvoyance, permitting her to see through and read the minds of those she has previously touched via quantum entanglement. She offers to help him locate Touko Kirishima at her Christmas Eve live stream event. Later, Sakuta finds he can use the same ability to perceive Sara's vision and thoughts through their link. On Christmas Eve, Mai unexpectedly meets them at Fujisawa Station and drives them to Kamakura; while queuing at a mont blanc stand, Sakuta uses this link to see Sara admit to herself that she cannot compete with Mai, causing her to consciously relinquish her power and run away. Mai and Sakuta find Sara lamenting the loss of her Adolescence Syndrome in the bamboo forest of Hōkoku-ji, where she pleads for Mai to "lend" her Sakuta, a request Mai refuses. The trio then proceed to the live stream location, arriving too late and failing to identify Touko, who remains invisible to Sara. After departing, Mai and Sakuta drive Sara home before continuing to their booked resort in Hakone, where Sakuta has a prophetic dream.
24	11	"The World Dreams"; Transliteration: "Yumemiru Sekai" (Japanese: 夢見る世界)	Sotaro Shimizu	Sotaro Shimizu	September 13, 2025
Sakuta's dream has Mai revealing herself as Touko Kirishima during a music festival at the Yokohama Red Brick Warehouse. Mai's manager comes to her with an offer to perform at a music festival on April 1 while he is discussing this dream with her. Over the following days, Sakuta hears of dreams that others in his circle had experienced on the night of Christmas Eve, while also finding out that Mai did not have a dream that night. On January 6, his first day back at university, Sakuta has a conversation with Takumi where he learns that he is from Hokkaido and does not remember why he chose to attend this particular university. Sakuta sits an exam but is interrupted by Nene, still invisible while wearing a miniskirt Santa Claus outfit, who is clearly disturbed about the rumors on social media of Mai being Touko Kirishima. Sakuta promises Nene that Mai will come clean on Coming of Age Day and deny the rumors. After the exam, Miori tells Sakuta that she saw the miniskirt Santa, and also believes that Nene is not Touko Kirishima. The following day, Sakuta learns from a phone call with Mai that she will serve as a police chief for a day at an event in Fujisawa on February 4, which alarms Sakuta as February 4 was the date of a dream that Tomoe told him about, in which Mai had been left unconscious by equipment falling on her during the same event.
25	12	"Reindeer's Work"; Transliteration: "Tonakai no Shigoto" (Japanese: トナカイの仕事)	Kosuke Kuremizu	Kosuke Kuremizu	September 20, 2025
At the Fujisawa Coming-of-Age Ceremony on January 9, Mai publicly denies all rumors identifying her as Touko Kirishima. A week later, Nene instructs Sakuta to be available on January 30. That day, she drives him to a shopping centre in Motomachi to purchase a scarf for Takumi, who she confirms was her boyfriend back when they were attending high school in Hokkaido. After guiding him to buy another Christmas related item, she asks him to deliver the scarf. Recognizing Nene's lingering attachment to Takumi, Sakuta uses her phone to contact him and discovers he is departing for Haneda Airport for an emergency back home in Hokkaido. They intercept him at the airport, but Takumi displays no memory of Nene. On February 1, Miori shows Sakuta a video of Nene's past performance of a Touko Kirishima song, which stopped receiving views in April, when the new academic year started. She also shows him recent online covers of other Touko Kirishima songs, which no one but them can currently perceive. Later, Takumi calls after a friend's funeral, recalling the deceased's lack of a dream on Christmas Eve. This triggers Sakuta's fear for Mai's safety, prompting a relieved embrace when she arrives at his apartment. Two days later, Sakuta visits Nene's residence and clears trash at her behest. Sakuta salvages her old college pageant trophy and, while helping her with a building block project, realizes she has now forgotten Takumi and is dismissing the entirety of her previous identity. He leaves to contact Rio, who theorizes that Nene's pursuit of becoming the Touko Kirishima identity will endanger Mai.
26	13	"No Dreams of Santa Claus"; Transliteration: "Santa Kurōsu no Yume o Minai" (Japanese: サンタクロースの夢を見ない)	Taito Kawakami & Hidetoshi Takahashi	Sōichi Masui	September 27, 2025
Sakuta decides to resolve Nene's Adolescence Syndrome by bringing her trophy to Takumi in Hokkaido. Accompanied by Ikumi, who books their flights and accommodations, Sakuta is able to meet with Takumi at Sapporo Airport. Upon seeing the trophy, Takumi finally remembers Nene. The next day, Takumi returns to Yokohama with Sakuta and Ikumi to find Nene, eventually tracking her down at a rental parking garage. Takumi stops Nene by jumping out in front of her car, then professes his love for her. This causes Nene to remember Takumi in return, finally rendering her visible again as she laments over what she had turned herself into in attempting to become famous as Touko Kirishima when she was unable to do so as herself after moving to Tokyo. Nene offers to drive Sakuta and Ikumi to the event adjacent to Tsujidō Station where Mai would be speaking as the police chief for a day, to protect her from other would be Touko Kirishimas. Sakuta notices that the event is dangerously overcrowded because of the otherwise invisible Santa-costumed individuals who all believe themselves to be Touko Kirishima, and as the audience breach the stage Mai was speaking from, Sakuta rushes to save Mai from a set of loudspeakers about to fall on her. He suffers an injury to his head, but Mai catches him before he falls and calls for an ambulance. Sakuta is rushed to hospital in an ambulance driven by Kunimi, but later discharged after his injury is treated. As he leaves the treatment room, Ikumi, Takumi, Nene, Rio, Kaede, Tomoe and Sara visit him, with Mai last to see him after helping with the police investigation into the crowd crush. On March 31, the day before Mai is to perform at the Music festival in Yokohama, Sakuta and Miori pass their driving license exams. As they talk about the rumors that Mai is Touko Kirishima that have once again resurfaced, Sakuta sees the elementary school aged backpack clad Mai again.

=== Rascal Does Not Dream of a Dear Friend (2026) ===
No.	Title	Directed by	Screenplay by	Original release date	Ref.
4	"Rascal Does Not Dream of a Dear Friend"; Transliteration: "Seishun Buta Yarō wa Diafurendo No Yume o Minai" (Japanese: 青春ブタ野郎はディアフレンドの夢を見ない)	Sōichi Masui	Masahiro Yokotani	October 16, 2026	
On April 1, Mai shockingly reveals herself to be the internet singer Touko Kirishima, mirroring a strange dream Sakuta had on Christmas Eve. Impossible events that everyone previously dreams of starts to occur. Sakuta receives a warning from an alternate reality counterpart to stop Touko Kirishima before reality is completely rewritten.

== Home media release ==
=== Japanese ===
Aniplex (Japan – Region 2/A)
Vol.	Episodes	Cover art	Release date	Ref.
Season 1
1	1–3	Mai Sakurajima	December 19, 2018	
2	4–6	Tomoe Koga	February 6, 2019	
3	7–8	Rio Futaba	March 6, 2019	
4	9–10	Nodoka Toyohama	April 3, 2019	
5	11–13	Kaede Azusagawa	May 15, 2019	
—	1–13 + Film 1	Mai Sakurajima (bunny suit)	May 31, 2023	
Films
—	Film 1	Shoko Makinohara	November 27, 2019	
—	Film 2	Kaede Azusagawa	November 29, 2023	
—	Film 3	Mai Sakurajima (young)	June 26, 2024	
Season 2
1	1–3	Uzuki Hirokawa	September 17, 2025	
2	4–7	Ikumi Akagi	October 22, 2025	
3	8–10	Sara Himeji	November 19, 2025	
4	11–13	Nene Iwamizawa	December 24, 2025	

=== English ===
Aniplex of America (North America – Region A)
Release	Cover art	Release date	Ref.
Film 1	Shoko Makinohara	June 30, 2020	
Season 1 + Film 1	Mai Sakurajima	November 14, 2023	
Film 2	Kaede Azusagawa	July 16, 2024	
Film 3	Mai Sakurajima (young)	December 10, 2024	
Season 2	Nene Iwamizawa	July 7, 2026	
