= Aya Yamane =

Japanese voice actress

- 山根 綺
- Born: 4 February 1997 (age 29); Yokohama, Kanagawa Prefecture, Japan
- Occupations: Voice actress; singer
- Years active: 2015–present
- Agent: Aoni Production
- Notable work: Mikoto Aketa in The Idolmaster Shiny Colors; Sui Yamada in World's End Harem; Benisumomo in In the Heart of Kunoichi Tsubaki; Subaru Hoshina in The Fragrant Flower Blooms with Dignity; Riho Tsukishima in The Café Terrace and Its Goddesses; Daitaku Helios in Umamusume: Pretty Derby
- Height: 162 cm (5 ft 4 in)

Aya Yamane (山根 綺, Yamane Aya; born 4 February 1997) is a Japanese voice actress and singer affiliated with Aoni Production. She is known for voicing Shisel in Magatsu Wahrheit: Zuerst, Ruhuyu in Show by Rock!!, Mikoto Aketa in The Idolmaster Shiny Colors, Daitaku Helios in Umamusume: Pretty Derby, Sui Yamada in World's End Harem, Benisumomo in In the Heart of Kunoichi Tsubaki, Subaru Hoshina in The Fragrant Flower Blooms with Dignity, Riho Tsukishima in The Café Terrace and Its Goddesses, and Cathy in Sugar Apple Fairy Tale.

== Biography ==
Yamane was born on 4 February 1997 in Yokohama. She is of Chinese descent, with her father being half-Chinese and her mother being one-fourth Chinese. She was educated at a high school near Yokohama Station and Amusement Media Academy, where she was part of the 2016 graduating class. She was an assistant personality for Yū Kobayashi's radio show Kobayashi Yu Weekly.

In September 2020, she was cast as Shisel in Magatsu Wahrheit: Zuerst. In December 2020, she was cast as Sui Yamada in World's End Harem. In March 2022, she was cast as Benisumomo in In the Heart of Kunoichi Tsubaki. In September 2022, she was cast as Freya Chocolate in Sylvanian Families: Freya's Happy Diary. In November 2022, she was cast as Riho Tsukishima in The Café Terrace and Its Goddesses. In December 2022, she voiced Cathy in Sugar Apple Fairy Tale. In August 2023, she was cast as Noir in Rail Romanesque.

She voiced Mikoto Aketa, one of the two members of the unit SHHis, in The Idolmaster Shiny Colors, a spinoff of The Idolmaster franchise. Previously, she had unsuccessfully auditioned for Shiny Colors and Cinderella Girls, including for Shiny Colors characters Tōru Asakura and Hinana Ichikawa, and she chose Mikoto over Luca Ikaruga because she "saw [in the former] a future where we could walk together". She performed in two SHHis singles: Layered Wing 08 (which charted at #6 in the Oricon Singles Chart) and Panorama Wing 08 (which charted at #10 in the Oricon Singles Chart).

She voiced Ruhuyu as part of Mashumairesh!!, an in-universe singing unit in Sanrio's Show by Rock!! franchise. She voiced the character in the anime adaptation Show by Rock!! Mashumairesh!! and the game Show by Rock!! Fes A Live, and she performed in Mashumairesh!!'s 2021 single Trigger Rock. She voices Daitaku Helios in the Umamusume: Pretty Derby franchise; she reprised the role in the anime, video game, and 2023 stage play.

She is a member of the seiyū vocal unit Kleissis, where she portrays the in-group role of Hirona.

== Filmography ==
=== Anime series ===
2016

- Orange, schoolgirl

2017

- One Piece, Onē-san
- The Idolmaster SideM, schoolgirl

2018

- Bakutsuri Bar Hunter, trolling girl
- GeGeGe no Kitarō, Kumiko Dote, Karin Yamane
- Hug! Pretty Cure, chibi Hari
- Muhyo & Roji's Bureau of Supernatural Investigation, student

2019

- Actors: Songs Connection, SASA
- Case Closed, receptionist
- Kiratto Pri Chan, girl
- Rifle Is Beautiful, announcer
- The Disastrous Life of Saiki K.: Reawakened, elementary school student

2020

- A Certain Scientific Railgun T, Shokuho faction member
- A Destructive God Sits Next to Me, young Utsugi Tsukimiya
- Attack on Titan, kids
- Chibi Maruko-chan, Miyake-san
- Fire Force, hostess
- Fly Me to the Moon, reporter
- If My Favorite Pop Idol Made It to the Budokan, I Would Die, Ruri
- Is the Order a Rabbit? Bloom, kid
- Kaguya-sama: Love Is War, friend
- Magatsu Wahrheit: Zuerst, Shisel
- Mewkledreamy, Mika
- Our Last Crusade or the Rise of a New World, Michaela
- Re:Zero, villager
- Seton Academy: Join the Pack!, young Jin Mazama
- Show by Rock!! Mashumairesh!!, Ruhuyu
- Tamayomi, Shūgetsu Yō
- The Day I Became a God, festival guest
- The Millionaire Detective Balance: Unlimited, police officer

2021

- Amaim Warrior at the Borderline, immovable Naho
- Blue Reflection Ray, Saya
- Cells at Work!, platelet 2, solar cell
- Full Dive, Melissa
- Selection Project, Marie
- Skate-Leading Stars, student
- Taisho Otome Fairy Tale, young Tamahiko Shima, Yukino
- Umamusume: Pretty Derby, Daitaku Helios
- Vivy: Fluorite Eye's Song, Leclerc
- WIXOSS Diva(A)Live , Mē-chan
- World's End Harem, Sui Yamada

2022

- Healer Girl, Kenji Morishima
- In the Heart of Kunoichi Tsubaki, Benisumomo
- Luminous Witches, Rosalie de la Poype
- Mobile Suit Gundam: The Witch from Mercury, Secelia Dote
- Raven of the Inner Palace, third consort
- Skeleton Knight in Another World, Ceriana
- Sylvanian Families: Freya's Happy Diary, Freya Chocolate

2023

- 16bit Sensation: Another Layer, Toya Yamada
- The Café Terrace and Its Goddesses, Riho Tsukishima
- Rail Romanesque, Noir
- Rurouni Kenshin, Makimachi Misao
- Sugar Apple Fairy Tale, Cathy

2024

- 2.5 Dimensional Seduction, 753♡
- Chillin' in Another World with Level 2 Super Cheat Powers, Balirossa
- Demon Lord 2099, Reynard Hizuki Yamada
- Re:Monster, Hobsei
- Re:Zero, Liliana Masquerade
- 'Tis Time for "Torture," Princess, Krall
- The Unwanted Undead Adventurer, Laura Satii

2025

- Grand Blue Dreaming 2nd Season, Sakurako Busujima
- Rascal Does Not Dream of Santa Claus, Ikumi Akagi
- The Fragrant Flower Blooms with Dignity, Subaru Hoshina

2026

- Dandivine, Natsu
- Haibara's Teenage New Game+, Uta Sakura
- Hana-Kimi, Mizuki Ashiya
- In the Clear Moonlit Dusk, Nobara Tone

2027

- 7-nin no Nemuri Hime, Flora

=== Original net animation ===
- Pokémon: Twilight Wings (2020), secretary
- Kaiju Decode (2021), Real Rei
- Tawawa on Monday (2021), Holstein-san
- Onimusha (2023), Sayo

=== Anime films ===
- My Hero Academia: Heroes Rising (2019)
- Goblin Slayer: Goblin's Crown (2020), female warrior
- Pokémon the Movie: Secrets of the Jungle (2020)
- Sailor Moon Eternal (2021), Deimos
- Rascal Does Not Dream of a Knapsack Kid (2023), Ikumi Akagi
- My Oni Girl (2024), Mio Takahashi
- Rascal Does Not Dream of a Dear Friend (2026), Ikumi Akagi

=== Video games ===
2017

- Robot Girls Z Online, Bardaler

2018

- Onsen Musume: Yunohana Collection, Karen Misasa

2019

- Atelier Online: Alchemists of Bressisle, Ran
- Kemono Friends 3, California Rakko
- Reverse Othellonia, Sakura

2020

- Genjuu Keiyaku Cryptract, Isna
- Show by Rock!! Fes A Live, Ruhuyu
- White Cat Project, Kuroka Manetho

2021

- KonoSuba: God's Blessing on this Wonderful World! Fantastic Days, Carla
- Gate of Nightmares, Jasmine, Riley
- Metallic Child, Surai
- Quiz RPG: The World of Mystic Wiz, Tsuzumi Kizaki
- The Idolmaster Shiny Colors, Mikoto Aketa
- Umamusume: Pretty Derby, Daitaku Helios

2022

- Heaven Burns Red, Seika Higuchi

2023

- Goddess of Victory: Nikke, D

2025

- Fate/Grand Order, Typhon Ephemeros/Epsilon
- Groove Coaster Future Performers, Ravi Haneruno

=== Stage plays ===
- Umamusume: Pretty Derby, Daitaku Helios
