= The Pet Girl of Sakurasou =

Japanese light novel series and its franchise

- Cover of the first light novel volume, featuring Mashiro Shiina

さくら荘のペットな彼女 (Sakura-sō no Pet na Kanojo)
- Genre: Romantic comedy
- Light novel
- Written by: Hajime Kamoshida
- Illustrated by: Kēji Mizoguchi
- Published by: ASCII Media Works
- Imprint: Dengeki Bunko
- Original run: January 10, 2010 – March 8, 2014
- Volumes: 13
- Manga
- Written by: Hajime Kamoshida
- Illustrated by: Hōki Kusano
- Published by: ASCII Media Works
- Magazine: Dengeki G's Magazine; Dengeki G's Comic
- Original run: April 2011 – July 2015
- Volumes: 8
- Anime television series
- Directed by: Atsuko Ishizuka
- Written by: Mari Okada
- Music by: Yuzo Hayashi
- Studio: J.C.Staff
- Licensed by: AUS: Madman Entertainment; NA: Sentai Filmworks
- Original network: Tokyo MX, MBS, TVA, tvk, Animax
- English network: NA: Anime Network
- Original run: October 9, 2012 – March 26, 2013
- Episodes: 24
- Video game
- Developer: Netchubiyori
- Publisher: ASCII Media Works
- Genre: Visual novel
- Platform: PlayStation Portable, PlayStation Vita
- Released: JP: February 14, 2013
- icon

The Pet Girl of Sakurasou (Japanese: さくら荘のペットな彼女, Hepburn: Sakura-sō no Petto na Kanojo; lit. "The Pet Girl of Sakura Dormitory") is a Japanese light novel series written by Hajime Kamoshida, with illustrations by Kēji Mizoguchi. ASCII Media Works published 13 volumes between January 2010 and March 2014. A manga adaptation illustrated by Hōki Kusano was serialized ASCII Media Works' Dengeki G's Magazine and Dengeki G's Comic.

A drama CD was released in June 2012. A 24-episode anime television series adaptation by J.C.Staff aired between October 2012 and March 2013. It has been licensed by Sentai Filmworks in North America.

== Plot ==
Sakura Dormitory is a dorm of the high school affiliated with Suimei University of the Arts (often shortened as Suiko), which hosts the strangest, most trouble-making students. After being kicked out of the normal dorm for keeping a stray cat, Sorata Kanda moves into Sakura Dormitory. As he starts to get used to the life in the dorm, Mashiro Shiina, a world-famous artist who cannot even take care of her daily life, moves in. Sorata is forced to become Mashiro's caretaker. The story is about their daily lives as well as mental growth.

== Characters ==
=== Sakura Dormitory residents ===
Sorata Kanda (神田 空太, Kanda Sorata)
Voiced by: Yoshitsugu Matsuoka (Japanese); Greg Ayres (English)
Sorata is the male protagonist of the story. He is a second-year (later third year) student of Suiko, who lives in room 101 of Sakura Dormitory. He was kicked out of the regular dorms after he chose not to give up a stray cat he found (he cannot resist taking in stray cats, and he ends up keeping seven of them in his room). As many of the Sakura Dormitory residents have outstanding grades and art skills, he often feels plain and normal among them.
Chihiro, the dorm supervisor, chooses him to take care of Mashiro, the "pet girl" referenced in the title, and he is, understandably, reluctant to do so but ends up getting used to it. At the end of the thirteenth novel, he confesses to Mashiro. Sorata decides to become a computer game designer, but his game proposal to a famous computer game company is repeatedly turned down. In the sixth novel, he decides to make a game on his own. A major plot of the story is how his personality and self-expectation evolves.
Mashiro Shiina (椎名 ましろ, Shiina Mashiro)
Voiced by: Ai Kayano (Japanese); Caitlynn French (English)
Mashiro is the female protagonist of the story. She is the resident of room 202, as well as a world famous artist who transferred into Suiko as a second-year to learn how to draw manga. Although her artwork is widely admired, she knows nothing other than drawing and has an extreme lack of common sense and living ability. Due to this, Sorata is forced to "adopt" Mashiro and help her out with the basic tasks of everyday life that everyone else takes for granted; he even has to pick out underwear for her to wear or she will go out without them. Her focus on what she wants to do, draw manga, awes Sorata and inspires him. She has very bad grades, since she cannot pay attention in class, but she can still pass the make-up exams by photographically memorizing all of the answers with her art talent. In the third novel, Mashiro starts to develop feelings for Sorata and she even claims that she cannot live without him. According to Mashiro, she plans to live in Sorata's house and work as a manga artist after graduation.
Nanami Aoyama (青山 七海, Aoyama Nanami)
Voiced by: Mariko Nakatsu (Japanese); Christina Kelly (English)
Nanami is Sorata's classmate, who later moves into Sakura Dormitory's room 203. Although she is harsh to Sorata, she actually has a crush on him, and everyone aside from Sorata has noticed this. Despite this, Sorata does not reciprocate her feelings at all, and only sees her as a friend. She left her home to become a voice actress without her parents' consent, and has to live on her own. After she finds herself low on money, as well as noticing that Sorata and Mashiro are becoming close, she chooses to move into Sakura Dormitory, which is more affordable than standard student housing. She meets Sorata's mother in the fifth novel and earns the latter's admiration. Sorata's mother even tells him that she would welcome Nanami as a daughter-in-law, even though she is aware her son has no romantic feelings for Nanami. In the sixth novel, she fails her voice actor tryout and decides to reconcile with her parents before deciding her next step. She is able to convince her parents to let her continue her VA studies and returns to Sakura Dormitory for her final year of high school. She speaks with a Kansai dialect when she is angry or flustered.
Misaki Kamiigusa (上井草 美咲, Kamiigusa Misaki)
Voiced by: Natsumi Takamori (Japanese); Luci Christian (English)
Misaki is the resident of room 201, a third-year-student of Suiko who later attends Suimei University of the Arts. She is very outgoing and optimistic and Sorata often refers to her as an "alien". She has very good grades and is very good at drawing, but the school decided to send her to Sakura Dormitory because she pays too much attention to drawing anime and manga. She is very good at animation and can handle the work required to make one without help from others. She has already sold an animation to a famous publishing company and made enough money off of it to live comfortably for the rest of her life. She has feelings for Jin, and openly expresses them, but Jin turns a blind eye to this and dates many other girls, which makes her very depressed. The two finally become a couple during the fifth novel. In the sixth novel, she registers their marriage without asking Jin, making them officially husband and wife; her new name is Misaki Mitaka (三鷹 美咲, Mitaka Misaki). She moves out of Sakurasou after graduating and moves into the house next door which has a recording studio in the basement.
Jin Mitaka (三鷹 仁, Mitaka Jin)
Voiced by: Takahiro Sakurai (Japanese); Scott Gibbs (English)
Jin is the resident of room 103 and a third-year student of Suiko. He is Misaki's childhood friend and has feelings for her, but he feels he is not good enough for her, so he ends up becoming a playboy. He has dated several girls, including Misaki's elder sister, but in the end he breaks up with all of them. He finally goes out with Misaki during the fifth novel. He wants to become a playwright/script writer worthy of her artistic talents, and chooses to attend a university in Ōsaka to achieve his goal. To pacify Misaki, he gives her a marriage registration form with his signature as a warranty that he will return, but Misaki signs and turns it in on the same day that he leaves for Ōsaka, which makes them officially married.
Ryūnosuke Akasaka (赤坂 龍之介, Akasaka Ryūnosuke)
Voiced by: Yui Horie (Japanese); Blake Shepard (English)
Ryūnosuke is the resident of room 102. Ryūnosuke is a second-year student of Suiko. He is a hikikomori who rarely leaves his room, and usually communicates with others by text message or e-mail. To reduce the need to personally communicate with others, he has written the "Maid" AI program, which responds to messages in his place. He is an expert of computer programming, and gives Sorata much useful advice about his computer game. According to Ryūnosuke, his ultimate goal is to have Maid become a real human. He has gynophobia, and will pass out when a girl touches him. This affliction becomes more severe after Rita falls in love with him and kisses him on the cheek. His favorite food is tomatoes, saying that he trusts tomatoes more than anything in the world. He is nicknamed "Dragon" by Misaki. During his middle school years, Ryūnosuke was a part of a game project made by his friends, but his intelligence was such that the others could not keep up with him and sidelined him from the project, resulting in Ryūnosuke becoming wary of forming friendship with anyone (including everyone in Sakura Dormitory). However, after a call from Rita, he manages to get over his fear of friendship and help his friends prevent Sakura Dormitory from being demolished.
Maid (メイド, Meido)
Voiced by: Yui Horie (Japanese); Holly Segarra (English)
Maid is Ryūnosuke's artificial intelligence program. Originally, Ryūnosuke designed Maid to filter and automatically reply to his cellphone messages and e-mails to save him time. However, Ryūnosuke keeps expanding Maid's AI ability. Maid is now capable of blocking and replying to a message or e-mail by her own preference, using new words she has recently learned from other messages, e-mails, or the Internet in the reply, anticipating people's emotions, writing computer or cellphone viruses and sending them out by herself, hacking into Suiko's computer network to steal information and even giving Sorata solid advice about his computer game program. The only way to distinguish Maid's messages from those of a human is that she replies too quickly. Ryūnosuke lets Maid enter a social networking service, with most people who meet her not realizing she is an AI program. According to Ryūnosuke, his ultimate goal is to give Maid an artificial body and become a real human.
As running the Maid program requires a lot of hard drive space and RAM, Ryūnosuke is forced to keep her working in the high standard server set in room 102 of the Sakura Dormitory, while giving orders and receiving the results via the Internet when he is absent from the room. On the computer, Maid is shown as a 3D model (designed by Misaki) on the bottom right corner of the screen, and will be shown using various tools and stationary depending on her current work. Maid appears to have a crush on Ryūnosuke, although it is unknown whether she has developed the feelings herself or if it is simply a part of her program design. After Rita falls in love with Ryūnosuke and kisses him, Maid starts a fight with her over the Internet since Ryūnosuke constantly lets Maid handle Rita's love letters and e-mails. Maid even asks Sorata to go to England and help her eliminate Rita.
Chihiro Sengoku (千石 千尋, Sengoku Chihiro)
Voiced by: Megumi Toyoguchi (Japanese); Olivia Swasey (English)
Chihiro is an art teacher at Suiko and the dorm supervisor of Sakurasou. She is Mashiro's cousin and arranged for her transfer to Suiko. She once wanted to become a professional artist and was a conscientious student while attending Suiko herself. Unfortunately her dreams did not come true for unknown reasons and she became an art teacher. Despite being a teacher, she often gives Sorata improper advice. Perhaps due to her disappointment, she has become cynical and lazy, often foisting undesired tasks, such as looking after Mashiro, on the unfortunate Sorata. She appears to only be interested in drinking and trying to find a man.
Rita Ainsworth (リタ・エインワーズ, Rita Einwāzu)
Voiced by: Ayako Kawasumi (Japanese); Skyler Sinclair (English)
Rita was Mashiro's roommate and caretaker when Mashiro lived in England. She became jealous of Mashiro's talent, and so advised Mashiro to draw manga hoping to see her fail, but later she regrets her actions and comes to Japan to bring Mashiro back to England. After realizing Mashiro's determination, she gives up and returns to England with Mashiro's father and starts studying art again. Even though he is cold to her, she falls in love with Ryūnosuke and kisses him on the cheek before leaving, which makes him pass out. Afterwards he ignores her and has his Maid AI handle all of her e-mails, which only fortifies her resolve. In the fifth novel, she visits Japan again to give Ryūnosuke Valentine's Day chocolate, and manages to kiss him on the lips, which makes him pass out again. She moves into Sakurasou after Nanami leaves.
Iori Himemiya (姫宮 伊織, Himemiya Iori)
Voiced by: Nobunaga Shimazaki (Japanese); Bryson Baugus (English)
Iori is Saori Himemiya's little brother and also a first-year student who starts living in Sakura Dormitory after Jin and Misaki graduate. He moves to Sakura Dormitory because he was caught peeking on the girls' bath. He has feelings for Kanna.
Kanna Hase (長谷 栞奈, Hase Kanna)
Voiced by: Haruka Yamazaki (Japanese); Hilary Haag (English)
Kanna is a first-year student living in Sakura Dormitory after Jin and Misaki graduate. Despite having the highest score on the entrance exam, she moves to Sakura Dormitory because it was discovered that she sometimes does not wear her panties at school due to stress.

=== Suiko students ===
Yūko Kanda (神田 優子, Kanda Yūko)
Voiced by: Yui Ogura (Japanese); Brittney Karbowski (English)
Yūko is Sorata's younger sister and is in her third year of junior high school; she later attends Suiko. She borders on having a brother complex and wants to be spoiled by Sorata. At first, she does not like any of the other girls because she thinks they are taking her brother away, but after spending time with them, she at least accepts Mashiro because she "has a few issues". However, she still dislikes Nanami because not only can she take care of herself, she also helped Sorata and Yūko's mother with many of the household chores during her stay at their home, garnering praise from their mother. She is quite air-headed and has a tendency to jump to conclusions about her brother and the other girls, mostly ending in perverse ways. She enters Suiko as a first-year student during Sorata's third year.
Daichi Miyahara (宮原 大地, Miyahara Daichi)
Voiced by: Taishi Murata (Japanese); Adam Gibbs (English)
Daichi is Sorata's and Nanami's classmate. He has feelings for Nanami.
Mayu Takasaki (高崎 繭, Takasaki Mayu)
Voiced by: Yurika Kubo (Japanese); Avery Smithhart (English)
Mayu is Sorata's and Nanami's classmate.
Saori Himemiya (姫宮 沙織, Himemiya Saori)
Voiced by: Ayumi Fujimura (Japanese); Mai Le (English)
Saori is a third-year student in the Music department who Misaki calls "Hauhau", and often produces music for Misaki's anime. She is in a relationship with Sōichirō.
Sōichirō Tatebayashi (舘林 総一郎, Tatebayashi Sōichirō)
Voiced by: Satoshi Hino (Japanese); Mike Haimoto (English)
Sōichirō is a third-year student and the President of the Student Council. He has known Jin for a very long time. He is in a relationship with Saori.
Otoha Nakano (中野 乙羽, Nakano Otoha)
Voiced by: Yuka Ōtsubo
Otoha is an original character from the visual novel version. She is a first-year student of Suiko.
Kōichi Shinagawa (品川 孝一, Shinagawa Kōichi)
Voiced by: Tomoaki Maeno
Kōichi is an original character from the visual novel version. He is a second-year student of Suiko.
Yayoi Honjō (本尊 弥生, Honjō Yayoi)
Voiced by: Yumi Uchiyama (Japanese); Kira Vincent Davis (English)
Nanami's classmate and a member of their school's softball team.
Fukaya Shiho (深谷 志保, Shiho Fukaya)
Voiced by: Saori Ōnishi (Japanese); Natalie Rial (English)
Mashiro's classmate.

=== Others ===
Kazuki Fujisawa (藤沢 和希, Fujisawa Kazuki)
Voiced by: Shintarō Asanuma (Japanese); Heath Morrow (English)
Initially introduced as one of the judges for "Let's Make a Game", Kazuki is later revealed to be an alumnus of Suiko and lived in Sakurasou. It is hinted that he has feelings for Chihiro. Sorata idolizes him, and Kazuki admires Sorata's efforts. He later becomes Sorata's mentor and game adviser.
Ayano Iida (飯田 綾乃, Iida Ayano)
Voiced by: Masumi Asano (Japanese); Shelley Calene-Black (English)
Ayano is Mashiro's editor for her manga and also a friend of Rita.
Fūka Kamiigusa (上井草 風香, Kamiigusa Fūka)
Voiced by: Saori Hayami (Japanese); Kira Vincent-Davis (English)
Fūka is Misaki's older sister. She is Jin's childhood friend and ex-girlfriend.
Koharu Shirayama (白山 小春, Shirayama Koharu)
Voiced by: Mikako Takahashi (Japanese); Patricia Duran (English)
Koharu is the homeroom teacher of Sorata's class. She and Chihiro were acquaintances when they were in high school.
Sorata's Father (空太の父)
Voiced by: Tōru Ōkawa (Japanese); Mike Vance (English)
Sorata's father.
Akiko Kanda (神田 明子, Kanda Akiko)
Voiced by: Satomi Arai (Japanese); Nastasia Marquez (English)
Sorata's mother.
Noriko (ノリコ)
Voiced by: Harumi Sakurai
Momoko (桃子)
Voiced by: Nao Tōyama (Japanese); Julia Traber (English)
Momoko is a voice actress and Nanami's friend.
Shiori Nanba (難波 しおり, Nanba Shiori)
Voiced by: Sachiko Kojima (Japanese); Patricia Duran (English)
Shiori is the driving instructor of Misaki.

== Media ==
=== Light novels ===
The Pet Girl of Sakurasou began as a light novel series written by Hajime Kamoshida, with illustrations drawn by Kēji Mizoguchi. ASCII Media Works published 13 volumes in the series under their Dengeki Bunko imprint encompassing 10 main novels and three short story collections released between January 10, 2010, and March 8, 2014.

No.	Release date	ISBN
1	January 10, 2010	978-4048682800
2	April 10, 2010	978-4048684637
3	August 10, 2010	978-4048687652
4	December 10, 2010	978-4048701235
5	May 10, 2011	978-4048704168
5.5	September 10, 2011	978-4048707497
6	December 10, 2011	978-4048861403
7	April 10, 2012	978-4048865432
7.5	August 10, 2012	978-4048868013
8	October 10, 2012	978-4048869867
9	March 9, 2013	978-4048914710
10	July 10, 2013	978-4048917940
10.5	March 8, 2014	978-4048664127

=== Manga ===
A manga adaptation, illustrated by Hōki Kusano, began serialization in the April 2011 issue of ASCII Media Works' Dengeki G's Magazine. The manga ended serialization in the magazine's May 2014 issue and continued serialization in Dengeki G's Comic between the June 2014 and July 2015 issues. The first tankōbon volume was released on October 27, 2011, and there have been eight published as of June 27, 2015. A four-panel anthology volume was published on February 27, 2012.

=== Anime ===
A 24-episode anime television series adaptation, produced by J.C.Staff, written by Mari Okada, and directed by Atsuko Ishizuka, aired between October 9, 2012, and March 26, 2013, on Tokyo MX. The series makes use of five pieces of theme music: three opening themes and two ending themes. The first opening theme is "Kimi ga Yume o Tsuretekita" (君が夢を連れてきた; You Brought a Dream) sung by Pet na Kanojotachi, consisting of Ai Kayano, Mariko Nakatsu, and Natsumi Takamori. The first ending theme "Days of Dash" is by Konomi Suzuki. Episode 3 uses the tune "Days of Dash", but different lyrics and accompanying animation than episodes 1 and 2. From episode 13 onwards, the second opening theme is "Yume no Tsuzuki" (夢の続き; The Continuation of the Dream) by Suzuki. The second ending theme is "Prime Number (Kimi to Deaeru Hi)" (Prime Number ~君と出会える日~; Prime Number ~The Day I Met You~) by Asuka Ōkura. The opening theme of episode 14 is "I Call Your Name Again" by Nakatsu under her character name Nanami Aoyama.

The series was licensed by Sentai Filmworks in North America, which re-released the series on Blu-ray with an English dub on August 25, 2020. The series was also simulcast on Crunchyroll. Following the acquisitions of Crunchyroll by Sony Pictures Television and Sentai Filmworks by AMC Networks, The Pet Girl of Sakurasou, among several other titles licensed by Sentai Filmworks, were removed from Crunchyroll on March 31, 2022.

=== Visual novel ===
A visual novel adaptation, developed by Netchubiyori and published by ASCII Media Works, was released on the PlayStation Portable and PlayStation Vita on February 14, 2013.

== Reception ==
The Mainichi Shimbun reported in April 2012 that the novels have sold over 850,000 copies.

The anime's sixth episode, The Blue After the Rain, had a scene where Jin Mitaka prepared samgye-tang for Nanami, who was sick. This was a departure from the original novel where the equivalent scene had him serve kayu instead. This change has resulted in backlash from some fans, leading to some claiming that this change was made as part of a stealth marketing campaign for Korean food. The claim was denied by both Animax and Media Factory, which were part of the production committee at the time.

== See also ==
- Just Because!—Original anime television series collaboration between Hajime Kamoshida and Tawawa on Monday's author Kiseki Himura
- Rascal Does Not Dream of Bunny Girl Senpai—Another light novel series by the same author
