= Rascal Does Not Dream of a Dreaming Girl =

2019 Japanese anime film

- Theatrical release poster
- 青春ブタ野郎はゆめみる少女の夢を見ない; Seishun Buta Yarō wa Yumemiru Shōjo no Yume o Minai
- Type: Film
- Based on: Rascal Does Not Dream
- Creators: Hajime Kamoshida; Kēji Mizoguchi (Note: original character design)
- Director: Sōichi Masui
- Screenplay: Masahiro Yokotani
- Character designer: Satomi Tamura
- Music: Fox Capture Plan
- Voices: Kaito Ishikawa; Asami Seto; Inori Minase; Nao Tōyama; Atsumi Tanezaki; Maaya Uchida; Yurika Kubo
- Country of origin: Japan
- Original language: Japanese

Production
- Sound director: Yoshikazu Iwanami
- Art directors: Hisayo Usui; Satoru Hirayanagi
- Cinematographer: Yoshihiro Sekiya
- Color designer: Asuka Yokota
- CG director: Yuusuke Noma
- Editor: Akinori Mishima
- Animation producer: Kazuya Kida
- Studio: CloverWorks
- Producers: Yūichirō Kurokawa; Ayako Yokoyama
- Production companies: AoButa Project: ABC Animation; Aniplex; Hakuhodo DY Music & Pictures; Kadokawa; Nagoya TV; Nippon BS Broadcasting; Tokyo MX
- Distributor: Aniplex
- Runtime: 89 minutes
- Gross: ¥377 million (Japan) $3.76 million (worldwide)

Original release
- Release: June 15, 2019

Rascal Does Not Dream of a Dreaming Girl (Note: Seishun Buta Yarō wa Yumemiru Shōjo no Yume o Minai (Japanese: 青春ブタ野郎はゆめみる少女の夢を見ない)) is a 2019 Japanese animated supernatural romantic drama film based on the sixth and seventh volumes of the light novel series Rascal Does Not Dream written by Hajime Kamoshida and illustrated by Kēji Mizoguchi. It is a sequel to the anime television series Rascal Does Not Dream of Bunny Girl Senpai, which adapts the first five volumes of the series. The film was originally released in June 2019 in Japan, and received limited theatrical releases in other regions in late 2019. A sequel film, Rascal Does Not Dream of a Sister Venturing Out, was released in 2023.

== Plot ==
In Fujisawa, Sakuta Azusagawa is in his second year of high school. He greatly enjoys his days with Mai Sakurajima, who for the past 6 months has been both his girlfriend and senior. However, their peaceful lives are interrupted by the appearance of Sakuta's first love, Shoko Makinohara. While taking his younger sister to the hospital, Sakuta discovers that there are two Shokos — the one in middle school and the older one who helped him in the past. Sakuta discovers that the middle school Shoko is suffering from a heart disease that urgently requires heart transplantation to save her life.

When both Sakuta and Mai become concerned about the middle school Shoko's situation and think of ways to help her, Sakuta eventually figures out the link between his wounds and adult Shoko. Adult Shoko comes from the future after a successful heart transplant, and her heart donor was Sakuta himself — who Shoko reveals was declared brain dead after a near-fatal traffic accident on Christmas Eve. However, Shoko developed feelings for Sakuta through their interactions in her youth, so she decided to come back to the past and save his life. Against Mai's wishes, Sakuta decides to sacrifice himself so that Shoko can live. Sakuta nearly gets run over, but Mai pushes him aside at the last moment and gets hit by the car instead. As a result, the entire chain of causality changes — Sakuta lives, but Mai is killed and becomes Shoko's heart donor instead.

Sakuta is in shock and devastated after Mai's death. Unable to bear seeing him like this, adult Shoko helps him one last time by telling him a secret: with her help, he can also return to the past to rewrite history, the ultimate implication being that the adult Shoko disappears forever. Sakuta makes a firm decision and returns to the past to save his love. Sakuta eventually returns to Christmas Eve and is in a situation like Mai when the story first started. Thus, he desperately tries to find someone that can see him. Borrowing inspiration from Mai, he wears a pink rabbit costume and goes to the train station. When he finds someone able to see him (Tomoe Koga), he requests a call to his past self and explains the situation to him. Eventually, he runs to the spot of Mai's death before it happened and pushes his past self away from the car. As his past self and future self can't meet, he disappears from the bunny costume before being run over by the car. Due to that, neither Mai nor Sakuta dies from the car crash, causing Shoko to not have a heart donor and thus destined to die. However, Sakuta refuses to accept such an outcome and together with Mai, they agree to find a way to help the dying young Shoko, knowing that saving her means risking the loss of everything that has happened up to then. Nevertheless, the couple vow to find each other and fall in love all over again. Sakuta visits young Shoko one last time, where she reveals that she now knows everything that has happened. She decides to create a future in which she never meets Sakuta or Mai, thus saving them from the sadness of the situation, with Shoko dying. Time winds back to when Shoko was in fourth grade. She bravely writes down her future hopes, giving up the memory of meeting Sakuta and Mai and the likelihood of meeting them at all.

In the end, time returns to New Year's in the present day. Mai has starred in a film based on Shoko's story, even though she does not remember her, which was a success. Sakuta and Mai visit a shrine and pass by a beach, where for the first time they encounter Shoko, now a healthy young girl because she received another heart from an unknown donor. Thanks to memory pieces crossing different timelines, Sakuta and Shoko eventually recognize each other.

== Voice cast ==
Character	Japanese	English
Sakuta Azusagawa	Kaito Ishikawa	Stephen Fu
Mai Sakurajima	Asami Seto	Erica Mendez
Shoko Makinohara	Inori Minase	Risa Mei
Tomoe Koga	Nao Tōyama	Lizzie Freeman
Rio Futaba	Atsumi Tanezaki	Jenny Yokobori
Nodoka Toyohama	Maaya Uchida	Cristina Vee
Kaede Azusagawa	Yurika Kubo	Kayli Mills

== Production and release ==
The project was announced on February 9, 2019. The film adapts the series' sixth and seventh volumes and is a sequel to the anime television series Rascal Does Not Dream of Bunny Girl Senpai, which originally aired in Japan between October and December 2018. The sequel film features a returning staff, including director Sōichi Masui, scriptwriter Masahiro Yokotani, character designer Satomi Tamura, and musical composer Fox Capture Plan. CloverWorks, which produced the 2018 television series, returns as the production studio, and all voice cast members reprised their roles from the anime.

The film opened in theaters in Japan on June 15, 2019, distributed by Aniplex. The film earned a cumulative total of ¥377,590,790 from 257,191 ticket sales in 24 days. The film has been promoted through merchandise based on characters from the series, including figures of Mai Sakurajima and Shoko Makinohara, which are scheduled for release by Aniplex in 2020.

In the United States, Aniplex of America premiered the film at Anime Expo on July 7, 2019. Aniplex of America, in collaboration with Funimation Films, released the film in select theaters in the US on October 2 and 3, 2019, and in Canada on October 4 and 5, 2019. In Australia and New Zealand, Madman Entertainment premiered the film at Madman Anime Festival Melbourne on September 14, 2019, with a limited theatrical run from October 10, 2019.

The film was made available to stream on Crunchyroll, including its brand new English dub, on June 19, 2025.

== Reception ==
Kim Morrissy of Anime News Network praised the film, describing it as "a real tearjerker" and that it was a "perfect encapsulation of what makes the Sakuta and Mai relationship so endearing," giving it an overall score of A−, and stated "The film brings all the major themes and characters in its greater story full circle and will probably make you laugh and cry in the process. If you are a fan of the Rascal series, it is your duty to see its grand climax in this movie".
