= Mari Nakatsu =

Japanese actress (born 1983)

- 中津 真莉
- Born: Mariko Nakatsu; July 8, 1983 (age 42); Higashiōsaka, Osaka Prefecture, Japan
- Occupations: Actress; voice actress
- Years active: 2010-present
- Agent: Sun Music Production
- Height: 156 cm (5 ft 1 in)
- Children: 1

Mari Nakatsu (中津 真莉, Nakatsu Mari; born Mariko Nakatsu (中津 真莉子, Nakatsu Mariko), July 8, 1983) is a Japanese actress and voice actress from Higashiōsaka, Osaka Prefecture. She is affiliated with Sun Music Production. She is known for her roles as Nanami Aoyama in The Pet Girl of Sakurasou and Kinue Atago in Saki: The Nationals.

== Career ==
Nakatsu graduated from the voice acting department of the Amusement Media Academy in Osaka.

On August 8, 2014, she officially changed her stage name from her birth name, Mariko Nakatsu, to Mari Nakatsu.

== Personal life ==
On October 10, 2020, Nakatsu announced on her blog that she had married a man from outside the entertainment industry. On May 15, 2021, she announced the birth of her first child.

== Filmography ==
=== Anime television ===
- Zoobles! (2011), SunSan, Chip, Mato
- Ginga e Kickoff!! (2012), Erika Takatō
- The Pet Girl of Sakurasou (2012), Nanami Aoyama
- Kingdom Season 2 (2013), Kō
- Danball Senki (2013), Suzune Kinbako
- Saki: Zenkoku-hen (2014), Kinue Atago
- Hello!! Kin-iro Mosaic (2015), Kana Higurashi
- Magical Girl Lyrical Nanoha ViVid (2015), Jiikurinde Eremia
- Tantei Kageki Milky Holmes TD (2015), Miki Hōjō
- Heavy Object (2016), Charm

=== Video games ===
- Danball Senki (2013), Suzune Kinbako
- The Pet Girl of Sakurasou (2013), Nanami Aoyama
- Yome Collection (2013), Nanami Aoyama
