= Dengeki G's Comic =

Japanese manga magazine

- Cover of the June 2014 issue of Dengeki G's Comic featuring Honoka Kōsaka from Love Live!
- Categories: Seinen manga
- Frequency: Monthly
- Publisher: ASCII Media Works
- First issue: August 9, 2012 (digital); April 30, 2014 (print)
- Final issue: March 30, 2019
- Country: Japan
- Based in: Tokyo
- Language: Japanese
- Website: Dengeki G's Comic

Dengeki G's Comic (電撃G'sコミック, Dengeki Jīzu Komikku) was a Japanese seinen manga magazine published by ASCII Media Works. The magazine was first published digitally on August 9, 2012, with volume 0, and started monthly publication with the following issue released on October 15, 2012. From April 2013 to April 2014, the magazine was released biweekly. Dengeki G's Comic began to be published monthly in print with the June 2014 issue sold on April 30, 2014. The magazine ended its print version on March 30, 2019, and the manga serialized in it continued as a web publication on Kadokawa's ComicWalker service and Dwango's Niconico Seiga website.

== Serialized manga ==
Title	Author	Illustrator	Issue run
And you thought there is never a girl online?	Shibai Kineko	Kazui Ishigami	October 2014 – ongoing
Angel Beats! Heaven's Door	Jun Maeda	Yuriko Asami	June 2014^{[A]} – ongoing
Appare! Tenkagomen	BaseSon	Sōsuke Miyashiro	November 2015^{[B]} – ongoing
Charlotte	Jun Maeda	Makoto Ikezawa, Yū Tsurusaki	September 2015 – ongoing
Charlotte The 4-koma: Seishun o Kakenukero!	Jun Maeda	Haruka Komowata	May 2015 – ongoing
Chōkōsennin Haruka	AliceSoft	Ponkotsu Works	October 2015^{[B]} – ongoing
Daitoshokan no Hitsujikai	August	Akane Sasaki	June 2014^{[A]} – January 2015
Idolising!	Sakaki Hirozawa	Shinnosuke Fujishima	June 2014^{[A]} – September 2014
Idolising Gaiden: Orin Rising!	Sakaki Hirozawa	Chiruwo Kazahana	June 2014^{[A]} – September 2014
Little Busters! End of Refrain	Key	Zen	June 2014^{[A]} – January 2015
Little Busters! EX The 4-koma	Key	Yūya Sasagiri	June 2014^{[A]} – December 2014
Love Live!	Sakurako Kimino	Arumi Tokita	June 2014^{[A]} – ongoing
Love Live! School Idol Diary	Sakurako Kimino	Masaru Oda	June 2014 – ongoing
Mahō Ineko to Garasu no Kutsushita	Daisuke Moriyama	Daisuke Moriyama	November 2015 – ongoing
Menacing Dog's	Shaa	Shaa	May 2015^{[B]} – ongoing
Ore no Kōhai ga Konna ni Kawaii Wake ga Nai	Tsukasa Fushimi	Sakura Ikeda	June 2014^{[A]} – July 2015
Plastic Memories: Say to Good-bye	Naotaka Hayashi	Yūyū	June 2015 – ongoing
Punch Line Max	Mages, Fuji TV	Ginichi	November 2015 – ongoing
Release the Spyce: Naisho no Mission			March 2018 – ongoing
Rewrite: Side-B	Key	Sakana Tōjō	June 2014^{[A]} – July 2015
Ro-Kyu-Bu!	Sagu Aoyama	Yūki Takami	June 2014^{[A]} – ongoing
Sakura-sō no Pet na Kanojo	Hajime Kamoshida	Hōki Kusano	June 2014^{[A]} – July 2015
Seishun Buta Yarō	Hajime Kamoshida	Tsugumi Nanamiya	January 2016 – ongoing
Sengoku Koihime: Otome Kenran Sengoku Emaki	BaseSon	Yukino Amagai	June 2014 – ongoing
Sword Art Online: Caliber	Reki Kawahara	Shii Kiya	September 2014 – August 2015
Sword Art Online: Progressive	Reki Kawahara	Kiseki Himura	June 2014^{[A]} – ongoing
Tenshi no 3P!	Sagu Aoyama	Yuzu Mizutani	July 2014 – ongoing
The Awakened Fate Ultimatum	Nippon Ichi Software	Peke	November 2014 – May 2015
The Elder Sister-like One	Pochi Iida	Pochi Iida	2016 – ongoing
Tōshin Toshi III	AliceSoft	Gō Yabuki	October 2015^{[B]} – ongoing
Washio Sumi wa Yūsha de Aru	Takahiro	Mottsun*	August 2014 – ongoing
Yagate Maken no Alicebell	Chūgaku Akamatsu	Gekka Urū	June 2014 – ongoing
Yūki Yūna wa Yūsha de Aru	Takahiro	Tōko Kanno	February 2015 – ongoing

== Notes and references ==
^{A} These manga were transferred from Dengeki G's Magazine.
^{B} These manga were transferred from Dengeki G's Festival! Comic.
