= Hajime Kamoshida =

Japanese writer

- Born: April 11, 1978 (age 48); Kanagawa Prefecture, Japan
- Occupation: Novelist
- Writing career
- Pen name: Hajime Kamoshida (かもしだ はじめ)
- Period: 2007–present
- Notable works: The Pet Girl of Sakurasou; Rascal Does Not Dream

Hajime Kamoshida (鴨志田一, Kamoshida Hajime; born April 11, 1978) is a Japanese novelist. His best known works are the light novel series The Pet Girl of Sakurasou and Rascal Does Not Dream series, which have received manga and anime adaptations. His debut work was Saga of a World Without God (神無き世界の英雄伝) in 2007.

== Works ==
=== Light novels ===
- Kaguya: Tsuki no Usagi no Gin no Hakobune (2007–2008)
- Houkago Idol (2010)
- The Pet Girl of Sakurasou (2009–2014)
- Rascal Does Not Dream (2014–2026)

=== Anime ===
- The Pet Girl of Sakurasou (2012–2013) – original creator, scriptwriter
- M3: The Dark Metal (2014) – scriptwriter
- Selector Spread WIXOSS (2014) – scriptwriter
- Mobile Suit Gundam: Iron-Blooded Orphans (2015-2017) – scriptwriter
- Just Because! (2017) – series composition, scriptwriter
- Rascal Does Not Dream series (2018–2026) – original creator
  - Rascal Does Not Dream of Bunny Girl Senpai (2018)
  - Rascal Does Not Dream of a Dreaming Girl (2019)
  - Rascal Does Not Dream of a Sister Venturing Out (2023)
  - Rascal Does Not Dream of a Knapsack Kid (2023)
  - Rascal Does Not Dream of Santa Claus (2025)
  - Rascal Does Not Dream of a Dear Friend (2026)
- Tawawa on Monday 2 (2021) – scriptwriter
- Synduality (2023) – original story draft

=== Manga ===
- Mobile Suit Gundam: Iron-Blooded Orphans Steel Moon (2014–2018)
- Tora Kiss: A School Odyssey (2012–2014)
- Mobile Suit Gundam Eight (2025–)
