= Rascal Does Not Dream of a Sister Venturing Out =

2023 Japanese anime film

- Theatrical release poster
- Directed by: Sōichi Masui
- Screenplay by: Masahiro Yokotani
- Based on: Rascal Does Not Dream by Hajime Kamoshida
- Produced by: Shunsuke Nara; Yūichirō Kurokawa
- Starring: Kaito Ishikawa; Asami Seto; Yurika Kubo; Nao Tōyama; Atsumi Tanezaki; Maaya Uchida; Sora Amamiya
- Cinematography: Yoshihiro Sekiya
- Edited by: Akinori Mishima
- Music by: Fox Capture Plan
- Production company: CloverWorks
- Distributed by: Aniplex
- Release date: June 23, 2023
- Running time: 73 minutes
- Country: Japan
- Language: Japanese

Rascal Does Not Dream of a Sister Venturing Out (Note: Seishun Buta Yarō ha Odekake Sisuta no Yume o Minai (Japanese: 青春ブタ野郎はおでかけシスターの夢を見ない)) is a 2023 Japanese animated supernatural romantic drama film based on the eighth volume of the light novel series Rascal Does Not Dream written by Hajime Kamoshida and illustrated by Kēji Mizoguchi. The film is produced by CloverWorks and serves as a sequel to the 2019 anime film Rascal Does Not Dream of a Dreaming Girl.

It was released in Japan on June 23, 2023. A sequel film, Rascal Does Not Dream of a Knapsack Kid was released later that same year.

== Plot ==
Following the events with Shoko Makinohara, Sakuta was celebrating Mai's graduation, studying for his university entrance exams, and seeing his sister Kaede return to school. During a meeting with the school counselor regarding where she wants to go to high school, Kaede is given doubts when she expresses she wants to go to Sakuta's school. The counselor points out her absences and that an online-based high school may be better, which Kaede retreats to her room after hearing while Sakuta and their father ponder the choices.

Still unsure about the online school, Sakuta attends an orientation class and discovers it may be a good fit for Kaede after seeing testimonials from other students including idol Uzuki Hirokawa. Sakuta asks Kaede again where she would like to go to school and she reaffirms Minegahara is the place she wants to go. With tutoring from Mai, Nodoka, and Sakuta, Kaede feels confident with her exams and turns in the application form. Sakuta though notices her bruises from her previous bout with her Puberty Syndrome and confronts Kaede about keeping it secret. He tells her she can always count on him to help her; reassuring her confidence to go back to the real world.

On the day of the exams, Sakuta is called into the school as Kaede fell ill during lunch. At the nurses office, Kaede tells him she did well on the tests she took thanks to the tutoring, but ran into a former classmate which brought back her memories of bullying; with her bruises returning. She scolds Sakuta, asking if he supported her or the "other Kaede" and didn't do what was best for his sister. Sakuta laments and gathers her items from the exam room and reads the journal "Kaede" kept previously. When they return home, Sakuta shows Kaede the brochure from the online school and calls Nodoka for a favor.

Sakuta and Kaede visit a shopping mall where Nodoka's idol group, Sweet Bullet, are performing live. Sakuta informs Kaede that the lead singer Uzuki also attends an online school. Though wanting to be normal like most kids, online classes aren't much different and though it is alternative, Uzuki is living a full life as well. After the show, they visit Uzuki and Nodoka; Uzuki's mother drives them to the familiar Shichirigahama beach. During the car ride, and while at the beach, Kaede asks questions about what the school life is like and whether or not she should attend as well. Uzuki confides that her own upbringing was similar which she skipped traditional school at first which lead to her leaving and attending school online. When Kaede asks which one was better, Uzuki said both have their positives. Kaede decides to enroll in online school and shows her friend what is available to her which makes them both happy.

Soon after, Kaede receives a call saying she was accepted to Minegahara due to the school needing to meet a class quota. After consideration, Kaede reaffirms her choice to go to online school which makes Sakuta smile as he leaves to go to work.

== Voice cast ==
| Character | Japanese | English |
|---|---|---|
| Sakuta Azusagawa | Kaito Ishikawa | Stephen Fu |
| Mai Sakurajima | Asami Seto | Erica Mendez |
| Kaede Azusagawa | Yurika Kubo | Kayli Mills |
| Tomoe Koga | Nao Tōyama | Lizzie Freeman |
| Rio Futaba | Atsumi Tanezaki | Jenny Yokobori |
| Nodoka Toyohama | Maaya Uchida | Cristina Vee |
| Uzuki Hirokawa | Sora Amamiya | Lisa Reimold |

== Production ==
The project was initially announced during the Aniplex Online Fest event in September 2022. It was confirmed to be released as a theatrical film in December 2022, featuring a returning staff, including director Sōichi Masui, scriptwriter Masahiro Yokotani and character designer Satomi Tamura. The film is a sequel to Rascal Does Not Dream of a Dreaming Girl and is adapted from the eighth volume of the light novel series Rascal Does Not Dream, written by Hajime Kamoshida and illustrated by Kēji Mizoguchi.

Around one year after the end of the production of the television series and the previous film, in an event Masui was asked about his interest about making the sequel by the producer of the anime. When the production of the previous film just finished, Masui knew there were the eighth and ninth volumes of the novel series and wanted to make the sequel already at that time. Although he showed his interest immediately, it took a long time to gather the staff again and kick start the production, as the production team was once dismissed and the staff had other jobs scheduled already. From the very beginning he wanted to have Yokotani and Tamura joining the production again, and it took no time for Yokotani to start writing the script.

== Release ==
Rascal Does Not Dream of a Sister Venturing Out premiered theatrically in Japan on June 21, 2023.

In the United States, CloverWorks premiered the film at Anime Expo on July 3, 2023. Odex released the movie gradually in selected South East Asian countries in September 2023. It was released in India by PVR Inox Pictures on October 13, 2023. It was released in U.S. theaters by Aniplex of America on March 24, 2024, along with Knapsack Kid, with both films having an English dub which released on March 25, 2024.

== Reception ==
The film debuted at fourth (first among Japanese movies) at the Japanese box office, earning around ¥175 million on its opening weekend.

== Sequel ==
A third film in the series, titled Rascal Does Not Dream of a Knapsack Kid, adapting volume nine, premiered on December 1, 2023.
