= Rascal Does Not Dream of a Knapsack Kid =

2023 Japanese anime film

- Theatrical release poster
- Directed by: Sōichi Masui
- Screenplay by: Masahiro Yokotani
- Based on: Rascal Does Not Dream by Hajime Kamoshida
- Produced by: Shunsuke Nara; Yūichirō Kurokawa
- Starring: Kaito Ishikawa; Asami Seto; Yurika Kubo; Nao Tōyama; Atsumi Tanezaki; Maaya Uchida; Inori Minase
- Cinematography: Yoshihiro Sekiya
- Edited by: Akinori Mishima
- Music by: Fox Capture Plan
- Production company: CloverWorks
- Distributed by: Aniplex
- Release date: December 1, 2023
- Running time: 75 minutes
- Country: Japan
- Language: Japanese

Rascal Does Not Dream of a Knapsack Kid (Note: Seishun Buta Yarō wa Ransel Girl no Yume o Minai (Japanese: 青春ブタ野郎はランドセルガールの夢を見ない)) is a 2023 Japanese animated supernatural romantic drama film based on the ninth volume of the light novel series Rascal Does Not Dream written by Hajime Kamoshida and illustrated by Kēji Mizoguchi. The film is produced by CloverWorks, serves as a sequel to the anime film Rascal Does Not Dream of a Sister Venturing Out, and marks the end of the High School Student Arc of the series.

It was released in Japan on December 1, 2023.

In its post-credits scene, the University Student Arc is announced.

== Plot ==
In a dream, Sakuta envisions a young Mai Sakurajima on a beach asking him if he is lost. Sakuta wakes up and continues his life as usual; going to high school, studying for university, working, and dating Mai. One evening while studying with her, Mai brings out a marriage certificate she received as a half-joke from her co-stars which they both fill out. Sakuta asks her to keep it despite her protests, but says it is more beneficial for her to hold onto it than him at the time. Before she leaves, Sakuta shows Mai a new scar stemming from his belly button. They assume it is a new Puberty Syndrome case, with Futaba asking him to consult young Shoko Makinohara as she knows of multiple realities, but they leave it for the time being.

Later, Sakuta receives a call from his and Kaede's dad that their mother is doing better and will be able to return home soon. Their mother expresses wanting to see Kaede again and they arrange for a dinner together. After Kaede graduates from middle school, with their dad present and Mai attending in secret, the family has a nice evening together with Kaede spending the night while Sakuta has to leave since he has school the next day. Before leaving, his father hands him a key to their apartment in Yokohama in case they have more family dinners together.

Sakuta wakes up the next day and returns to school, but notices his teacher does not return his test back to him. Soon he realizes that no one can see nor hear him and returns to his parents' apartment where he deduces his mother is now the cause of the syndrome; however, neither his mother or Kaede can see nor hear him now, with the former's diary she used while in the hospital mentions nothing of Sakuta. Remembering the night before, Sakuta realizes that he and his mother never looked each other in the eye and never spoke to each other. Because he had to grow up so quickly to take care of Kaede while their mother was in the hospital, Sakuta put her in the back of his mind. With his mother healthy, he was no longer needed to perform his previous duties, so he ended up never needing to exist, hence his scar on his belly resembling his umbilical cord.

Returning to the beach, Sakuta sees the young Mai again who leads him "home." When he wakes up, he realizes he is not in the apartment he and Kaede shared in Fujisawa, but the family home they grew up in outside of Yokohama. Piecing things together after going to school and speaking with Futaba, he had apparently saved Kaede from bullying somehow which prevented her bruises, giving him the ideal life he never had, but he also notices a student (Ikumi Akagi) he had never met before at his high school, although they were formerly middle school classmates. Sakuta realizes that this is not the life he needs, so he has one last pleasant call with his mother before asking young Mai to take him back to his original timeline.

Back in his timeline, Sakuta notices his journal has a message reading to get a grip on his life, put a letter into Mai's mailbox, and figure out his relationship with someone named Touko Kirishima. Deducing that he switched places with his "ideal universe's" Sakuta, his own syndrome is still unresolved. Leaving the letter in Mai's mailbox, Sakuta resumes his life as normal while invisible to everyone else until Mai arrives. Since she held onto the marriage certificate, she was able to remember him and they embrace. That evening, Mai spends the night with Sakuta, consoling him as he does not know how to resolve the issues he has had to deal with regarding his mom. Mai comforts him saying that it is all a part of growing up and he needs to confront these feelings head on.

At the hospital for her checkup, Sakuta slips into the exam room with his mom seeing him again and they share a heartfelt reunion. Kaede soon enters and the three become a family once more.

Later at work, Sakuta notices the young Shoko listening to music. Shoko informs him that her family intends to move to Okinawa, and they have a playful conversation until Shoko informs Sakuta that the song she is listening to and the singer, Touko Kirishima, do not appear to exist in any other timeline that Shoko remembers.

== Voice cast ==
| Character | Japanese | English |
|---|---|---|
| Sakuta Azusagawa | Kaito Ishikawa | Stephen Fu |
| Mai Sakurajima | Asami Seto | Erica Mendez |
| Kaede Azusagawa | Yurika Kubo | Kayli Mills |
| Tomoe Koga | Nao Tōyama | Lizzie Freeman |
| Rio Futaba | Atsumi Tanezaki | Jenny Yokobori |
| Nodoka Toyohama | Maaya Uchida | Cristina Vee |
| Shoko Makinohara | Inori Minase | Risa Mei |

== Production and release ==
The project was initially announced during the Aniplex Online Fest event in September 2022, alongside its predecessor Rascal Does Not Dream of a Sister Venturing Out. It is adapted from the ninth volume of the light novel series Rascal Does Not Dream, written by Hajime Kamoshida and illustrated by Kēji Mizoguchi. The film features a returning staff, including director Sōichi Masui, scriptwriter Masahiro Yokotani and character designer Satomi Tamura, and premiered theatrically in Japan on December 1, 2023.

It was released in U.S. theaters by Aniplex of America on March 24, 2024, along with Sister Venturing Out with both films having an English dub which released on March 25, 2024.

== Reception ==
The film debuted at fourth at the Japanese box office, earning over ¥160 million on its opening weekend.
