= Yurika Kubo =

Japanese voice actress (born 1989)

- 久保 ユリカ
- Born: Yurika Kubo (久保 由利香); 19 May 1989 (age 37); Nara, Nara, Japan
- Other names: Shikaco; Yurika Narahara (楢原 ゆりか)
- Occupations: Voice actress; tarento; model; gravure idol; singer
- Years active: 2010–present
- Agent: Stay Luck
- Notable work: Love Live! as Hanayo Koizumi; Is It Wrong to Try to Pick Up Girls in a Dungeon? as Loki; Rascal Does Not Dream of Bunny Girl Senpai as Kaede Azusagawa; Girls' Last Tour as Yuuri; Undefeated Bahamut Chronicle as Philuffy Aingram; Please Put Them On, Takamine-san as Takane Takamine; Himitsu no AiPri as Tsumugi Suzukaze; Classroom of the Elite as Kikyo Kushida
- Height: 163 cm (5 ft 4 in)
- Website: www.shikaco.jp

Yurika Kubo (久保 ユリカ, Kubo Yurika; born 19 May 1989, formerly rendered as 久保 由利香 until 2011) is a Japanese voice actress, singer and model. She is associated with Stay Luck. She is best known for voicing Hanayo Koizumi in the idol group μ's (pronounced "Muse"), which is part of the Love Live! franchise, and Tsumugi Suzukaze in Himitsu no AiPri. Her nickname is Shikaco.

== Career ==
In 2002, Kubo won the 6th Nicora Model Audition Grand Prix. She signed with LesPros Entertainment shortly after that, and worked as a fashion model. While at LesPros, she shared a room with Ami Kikuchi.

In 2008, she moved to Sparks Productions and worked as a gravure model under the name Yurika Narahara.

Kubo moved to JMO Productions in 2010. She started voice acting while working as a gravure model for JMO, and started obtaining voice acting roles in 2012. She left JMO in 2012, and started working with Clare Voice in 2015.

In early 2015, μ's, the idol group that Kubo performed with as "Hanayo Koizumi", won the 9th Annual Seiyū Award. In late 2015, they performed at the 66th NHK Kōhaku Uta Gassen. The group went on hiatus after their final concert on 31 March and 1 April 2016, at the Tokyo Dome.

On 25 December 2015, Kubo debuted as a solo artist and released her first single, "Lovely Lovely Strawberry" a few months later on 17 February 2016. She released her first full album on 10 May 2017.

Her contract with Clare Voice ended on 31 December 2017, and she began freelancing. Her fan club "SHiKAKO PARK", stopped taking new members on 1 January 2018, and shut down later that year on 31 May.

On 1 October 2019, it was announced that Kubo would be joining Stay Luck as her new agency.

On 1 July 2025, Kubo announced her marriage to a non-celebrity man.

== Filmography ==
=== Anime series ===
Year	Title	Role	Notes	Source
2012	The Pet Girl of Sakurasou	Mayu Takasaki		
2012	Say "I love you".	Girl	Ep. 5	
2012	Let's Go! Anpanman	Potato-kun, Kumata		
2012	Muv-Luv Alternative: Total Eclipse	Irina Baranowa	Ep. 8–10	
2012	Hunter × Hunter (2011)	Elevator girl	Ep. 27	
2012	Kin-iro Mosaic	Female student B	Ep. 3	
2013	Gatchaman Crowds	Ao Sawamura schoolgirl	Ep. 2–4, 9–12; Ep. 3–8	
2013	Nagi-Asu: A Lull in the Sea	Kaori Akiyoshi		
2013	The "Hentai" Prince and the Stony Cat.	Stony Cat		
2013	Yuyushiki	Female student D girl	Ep. 4–5	
2013	Kotoura-san	Hiyori Moritani		
2013	Love Live!	Hanayo Koizumi		
2014	Chikasugi Idol Akae-chan	Peperonpoppupoponchu Midorikawa		
2014	Magimoji Rurumo	Schoolgirl, Nekoneko sister		
2014	Love Live! 2nd Season	Hanayo Koizumi		
2015	Tantei Opera Milky Holmes	Rhythmic		
2015	Is It Wrong to Try to Pick Up Girls in a Dungeon?	Loki		
2015	Mikagura School Suite	Kumano-san		
2015	Monster Musume	Tionishia		
2015	Gate	Nanami Kuribayashi	Ep. 10	
2015	Valkyrie Drive: Mermaid	Meifon Sakura		
2015	Mobile Suit Gundam: Iron-Blooded Orphans	Echo Turbine		
2016	Undefeated Bahamut Chronicle	Philuffy Aingram		
2016	Ōya-san wa Shishunki!	Chie Satonaka		
2016	Dimension W	Shiora Skyheart		
2016	High School Fleet	Rin Shiretoko		
2016	Amanchu!	Cha-Komon		
2016	Natsume's Book of Friends	Little Girl Youkai		
2017	Idol Incidents	Sakurako Īzuka		
2017	Urara Meirocho	Koume Yukimi		
2017	WorldEnd	Pannibal		
2017	Seiren	Bus girl	Ep. 6	
2017	Is It Wrong to Try to Pick Up Girls in a Dungeon?: Sword Oratoria	Loki		
2017	Kaitō Tenshi Twin Angel	Kotobuki Urara		
2017	Tsugumomo	Kukuri		
2017	Makeruna!! Aku no Gundan!	Narration	Ep. 1	
2017	Minami Kamakura High School Girls Cycling Club	Korone Hōōji		
2017	Mahōjin Guru Guru	Mekemeke (Ep. 1, 3), Girieru (Ep. 2–3, 7–8)	Ep. 1–3, 7–8	
2017	Classroom of the Elite	Kikyō Kushida		
2017	Girls' Last Tour	Yūri		
2018	The Ryuo's Work Is Never Done!	Mio Mizukoshi		
2018	Citrus	Himeko Momokino		
2018	Rascal Does Not Dream of Bunny Girl Senpai	Kaede Azusagawa		
2019	Pastel Memories	Rei Kurushima		
2019	Joshi Kausei	Mayumi Furui		
2019	Afterlost	Kana		
2019	Demon Lord, Retry!	Momo		
2019	Granbelm	Nene Rin		
2019	Isekai Cheat Magician	Aerial		
2019	A Certain Scientific Accelerator	Esther Rosenthal		
2020	Mewkledreamy	Peko		
2020	Tsugu Tsugumomo	Kukuri		
2020	Rail Romanesque	Riiko		
2021	Cells at Work! Code Black	Platelet		
2021	Peach Boy Riverside	Jucerino		
2021	Tsukimichi: Moonlit Fantasy	Toa		
2021	The Fruit of Evolution	Origa Calmeria		
2022	Classroom of the Elite 2nd Season	Kikyō Kushida		
2022	Legend of Mana: The Teardrop Crystal	Li'l Cactus		
2023	The Legendary Hero Is Dead!	Marguerit		
2023	A Playthrough of a Certain Dude's VRMMO Life	Ulna		
2024	Classroom of the Elite 3rd Season	Kikyō Kushida		
2024	Hokkaido Gals Are Super Adorable!	Hina		
2024	A Condition Called Love	Hibiki Asami/Kyō-chan		
2024	Himitsu no AiPri	Tsumugi Suzukaze		
2024	My Deer Friend Nokotan	Neko Nekoyamada		
2024	Fairy Tail: 100 Years Quest	Touka		
2024	2.5 Dimensional Seduction	Xiaoyu		
2025	Ishura Season 2	Tu the Magic		
2025	Please Put Them On, Takamine-san	Takane Takamine		
2025	Backstabbed in a Backwater Dungeon	Sionne		
2025	The Banished Court Magician Aims to Become the Strongest	Yorha Eisentz		
2025	Ninja vs. Gokudo	Ange	Ep. 7–9	
2026	The Strongest Job Is Apparently Not a Hero or a Sage, but an Appraiser (Provisional)!	Tanya		
2026	The Warrior Princess and the Barbaric King	Nimhara		
2026	Tetsuryō! Meet with Tetsudō Musume	Ibuki Kawagoe		
TBA	Rebuild World	Alpha		

=== Anime films ===
Year	Title	Role	Notes	Source
2015	Love Live! The School Idol Movie	Hanayo Koizumi		
2015	The Anthem of the Heart	Kaori Takamura		
2016	Monster Strike: the Movie	Shirayukihime Ribbon		
2019	Rascal Does Not Dream of a Dreaming Girl	Kaede Azusagawa		
2020	High School Fleet: The Movie	Rin Shiretoko		
2020	The Island of Giant Insects	Inou Ai		
2023	Rascal Does Not Dream of a Sister Venturing Out	Kaede Azusagawa		
2023	Rascal Does Not Dream of a Knapsack Kid	Kaede Azusagawa		
2026	Rascal Does Not Dream of a Dear Friend	Kaede Azusagawa		

=== Original net animation ===
Year	Title	Role	Notes	Source
2021	The Way of the Househusband	Policure Host Woman, Halloween Costume Contest Host Woman		
2022	Kotaro Lives Alone	Takuya's Mother, Konoe		
2026	Yu-Gi-Oh! Card Game The Chronicles	Wynn		

=== Original video animation ===
Year	Title	Role	Notes	Source
2009	Departed to the future (Movie)	Mell		
2010	Bokura no LIVE Kimi to no LIFE	Hanayo Koizumi		
2010	Snow Halation	Hanayo Koizumi		
2011	Natsuiro Egao de 1, 2, Jump!	Hanayo Koizumi		
2012	Mogyutto "LOVE" de Sekkin Chuu!	Hanayo Koizumi		
2012	Wonderful Rush	Hanayo Koizumi		
2013	Music S.T.A.R.T!!	Hanayo Koizumi		

=== Video games ===
Year	Title	Role	Notes	Source
2013	The Guided Fate Paradox	Nerueru Tōjō		
2013	Kaku-San-Sei Million Arthur	Tristan		
2013	Love Live! School Idol Festival	Hanayo Koizumi		
2014	Kami-sama to Unmei Kakusei no Kurosuteeze	Nerueru Toujou		
2014	Miko no Mori	Juri Iwasa		
2014	Faibu Kurosu	Hanayo Koizumi		
2015	Kaden Shōjo	Hinata, Becky, Coin, Shinobu		
2015	Xuccess Heaven	Kiri Tagawa, Eru Tagawa		
2015	Shanago Collection	Akusera, Silvia, Noah		
2015	Rage of Bahamut	Susie		
2015	Aegis of Earth: Protonovus Assault	Berry		
2015	The Soul of Sevens	Sera		
2015	Ta ga Tame no Alchemist	Ishuna		
2015	Tatakae! Princess Doll	Nikora Mimori		
2015	Is it Wrong to Pick Up Girls in a Dungeon? Cross Estoria	Loki		
2015	Valiant Knights	Irisu		
2015	Prince of Stride	Kokoro Kohinata		
2015	Rebellion Blade	Tīri		
2015	Racing Musume	Sora Oji		
2016	Idol Incidents	Sakurako Īzuka		
2016	Idol Death Game TV	Shirase Tsubaka		
2016	Uppers	Runa Yurikawa		
2016	Endride: X Fragments	Maru		
2016	Orutanshia Saga: Sora no Kishidan	Fredricka		
2016	KinokoreR: Dainiji Kinoko Takenoko Hyakunen Sensō	Yuki-chan		
2016	Grand Summoners	Faron		
2016	Gurimoa: Shiritsu Gurimowāru Mahō Gakuen	Nana Urajiro		
2016	Aozora no Liberation	Lione		
2016	Drift Girls	Niria Maeta		
2016	BraveSword X BlazeSoul	Kōden Atsuka Hendo, Rongomianto		
2016	Hentai Shōjo: Formation Girls	Janne Marseille		
2016	Monster Strike	Zettai Fumetsu Idol Shirayukihime Ribbon		
2016	Monster Musume Online	Tionishia		
2016	World Cross Saga	Shīgā, Ariesu		
2017	Ichi Banketsu Online	Izanami		
2017	Gensō Shōjo	Da Qiao		
2017	Shironeko Project	Toruche, Surusu		
2017	Sorahime	F-104, A7M Reppu		
2017	Is It Wrong to Try to Pick Up Girls in a Dungeon? Orario Rhapsodia	Loki		
2017	Is It Wrong to Try to Pick Up Girls in a Dungeon? Memoria Phrase	Loki		
2017	Project Tokyo Dolls	Reina		
2017	Dia Horizon	Ena		
2017	Pastel Memories	Rei Kurushima		
2017	Kirara Fantasia	Koume Yukimi		
2017	Megido72	Baal, Halphas		
2018	O.N.G.E.K.I.	Rio Takase		
2019	Is It Wrong to Try to Pick Up Girls in a Dungeon? Infinite Combat	Loki		
2019	Arknights	Croissant		
2019	Azur Lane	Cavalla		
2021	Blue Archive	Shishidō Izumi		
2021	Cookie Run: Kingdom	Cocoa Cookie		
2023	Goddess of Victory: Nikke	Noir		
2024	Genshin Impact	Kachina		

=== Dubbing roles ===
- All of Us Are Dead, Lee Na-yeon (Lee Yoo-mi)
- I Know What You Did Last Summer, Danica Richards (Madelyn Cline)
- RRR, Sita (Alia Bhatt)
- Squid Game, Ji-yeong (240) (Lee Yoo-mi)
- Stalker's Prey, Laura Wilcox (Saxon Sharbino)
- Firebuds (Pow)

== Discography ==
=== Albums ===
Title	Release date	Oricon
Anata dake no Taiyō ni Naritai (あなただけの太陽になりたい)	2 April 2014	
Subete wa Taisetsu no Deai ~ Meeting with you creates myself ~ (すべてが大切な出会い～Meeting with you creates myself～)	10 May 2017	11

=== Singles ===
Title	Release date	Oricon
"Lovely Lovely Strawberry"	17 February 2016	6
"Summer Chance!!"	17 August 2016	12
"Arigato no Jikan" (ありがとうの時間)	7 December 2016	14
