= Rascal Does Not Dream =

Japanese light novel series and its adaptations

- The cover of the first volume Rascal Does Not Dream of Bunny Girl Senpai, featuring Mai Sakurajima

青春ブタ野郎 (Seishun Buta Yarō)
- Genre: Psychological; Supernatural; Romantic comedy
- Light novel
- Written by: Hajime Kamoshida
- Illustrated by: Kēji Mizoguchi
- Published by: ASCII Media Works
- English publisher: NA: Yen Press
- Imprint: Dengeki Bunko
- Original run: April 10, 2014 – October 9, 2026
- Volumes: 15 + 2 extras
- Manga
- Written by: Hajime Kamoshida
- Illustrated by: Tsugumi Nanamiya; Tsukumo Asakusa; Tsukako Akina; Akuro Yoshibe; Eranto
- Published by: ASCII Media Works
- English publisher: NA: Yen Press
- Magazine: Dengeki G's Comic
- Original run: December 1, 2015 – present
- Volumes: 13
- Anime television series

Rascal Does Not Dream of Bunny Girl Senpai
- Directed by: Sōichi Masui
- Produced by: Ayako Yokoyama; Yūichirō Kurokawa
- Written by: Masahiro Yokotani
- Music by: Fox Capture Plan
- Studio: CloverWorks
- Licensed by: AUS: Madman Entertainment; NA: Aniplex of America; SEA: Plus Media Networks Asia; UK: MVM Films
- Original network: ABC, Tokyo MX, GTV, GYT, BS11, Mētele, AT-X
- English network: SEA: Aniplus Asia
- Original run: October 4, 2018 – December 27, 2018
- Episodes: 13
- Anime television series

Rascal Does Not Dream of Santa Claus
- Directed by: Sōichi Masui
- Written by: Masahiro Yokotani
- Music by: Fox Capture Plan
- Studio: CloverWorks
- Licensed by: NA: Aniplex of America; SEA: Plus Media Networks Asia
- Original network: Tokyo MX, GTV, GYT, BS11, ABC, Mētele, AT-X
- Original run: July 5, 2025 – September 27, 2025
- Episodes: 13
- Anime films
- Rascal Does Not Dream of a Dreaming Girl (2019); Rascal Does Not Dream of a Sister Venturing Out (2023); Rascal Does Not Dream of a Knapsack Kid (2023); Rascal Does Not Dream of a Dear Friend (2026)
- icon

Rascal Does Not Dream, (Note: The original title of each volume is set according to the syntax Rascal Does Not Dream of... (青春ブタ野郎は...の夢を見ない, Seishun Buta Yarō wa... no Yume o Minai; literally "Teenage Pig Does Not Dream of...")) known in Japan as Seishun Buta Yarō (Japanese: 青春ブタ野郎; Rascal, lit. 'Teenage Pig') or AoButa (青ブタ), is a Japanese light novel series written by Hajime Kamoshida and illustrated by Kēji Mizoguchi. ASCII Media Works published seventeen volumes from April 2014 to October 2026 under their Dengeki Bunko imprint. A manga adaptation by various illustrators has been serialized in ASCII Media Works' seinen manga magazine Dengeki G's Comic since December 2015.

The story is set in Kanagawa Prefecture, where it follows a young female third-year Japanese high school pupil, once a famous child actress, who has mysteriously ceased her career. Known for her unapproachability, she catches the attention of a young man when he finds her in a bunny girl costume in the library which he discovers she suffers from Puberty Syndrome, a rare and supernatural condition affecting teenagers. As he attempts to assist her, he encounters more girls also affected by this enigmatic illness.

The first season of an anime television series adaptation by CloverWorks, Rascal Does Not Dream of Bunny Girl Senpai, aired from October to December 2018. An anime film, Rascal Does Not Dream of a Dreaming Girl, premiered in June 2019. A second anime film, Rascal Does Not Dream of a Sister Venturing Out, premiered in June 2023. A third anime film, Rascal Does Not Dream of a Knapsack Kid, premiered in December 2023. A second anime television season, Rascal Does Not Dream of Santa Claus, aired from July to September 2025. A fourth anime film, Rascal Does Not Dream of a Dear Friend, concluded the series and premiered in October 2026.

== Premise ==
High school student Sakuta Azusagawa's life takes a turn for the unexpected when he meets teenage actress Mai Sakurajima, dressed as a bunny girl, wandering through a library, not being noticed by anyone else there. Mai is intrigued that Sakuta is the only one who can see her, as other people are unable to see her, even when she is dressing normally or attempting to stay away from celebrity life. Calling this phenomenon "Adolescence Syndrome" (思春期症候群, Shishunki Shōkōgun), (Note: Also referred to as "Puberty Syndrome" in some translations, as well as the English dub.) Sakuta decides to solve this mystery, while continuing to get closer to Mai and meeting other girls who suffer from Adolescence Syndrome as well.

== Characters ==
=== Main ===
Sakuta Azusagawa (梓川 咲太, Azusagawa Sakuta)
Voiced by: Kaito Ishikawa (Japanese); Stephen Fu (English)
Sakuta is known for an unverified rumor that he hospitalized three people in middle school, causing him to avoid attention until meeting Mai leads him to investigate Adolescence Syndrome. His younger sister Kaede's condition deeply affects him, leaving three mysterious scars on his chest. After aiding Mai with her struggles, he assists others experiencing similar phenomena. Though kind and selfless—often prioritizing others over himself—he is also blunt, sarcastic, and prone to making playful, lewd remarks. Despite this, he remains respectful and considerate. His compassion is shaped by Kaede's ordeal and his desire to become kinder after meeting Shoko Makinohara. Because of the bullying incidents concerning his sister, he does not own a cellphone. He later attends the same Yokohama college as Mai and Nodoka, studying Statistical Science. To help afford the cost of living with Kaede in Fujisawa away from his parents, he works part time in a family restaurant, and after starting college, a cram school.
Mai Sakurajima (桜島 麻衣, Sakurajima Mai)
Voiced by: Asami Seto (Japanese); Erica Mendez (English)
Tired of her acting career, Mai leaves the spotlight and enrolls in a regular high school, only to find people gradually stop noticing her—eventually becoming completely invisible to them. Sakuta, the only one who still sees her, helps investigate. They first meet in a library where Mai tests her invisibility in a bunny girl outfit. When others forget her entirely, Sakuta restores her existence by publicly confessing his love. Though reserved, Mai is very kind and warm, and shows playfulness with Sakuta, despite easily flustering. Initially affected by family tensions, she proves to be deeply compassionate and selfless—helping Sakuta's sister and later sacrificing herself to save Sakuta and Shoko. As she has revived through the timelines, she continues acting while attending university with Sakuta, living in happiness together with him.
Tomoe Koga (古賀 朋絵, Koga Tomoe)
Voiced by: Nao Tōyama (Japanese); Lizzie Freeman (English)
Tomoe, a first-year at Sakuta's high school, first meets him when he helps a lost child—prompting her to jokingly accuse him of being a lolicon. Cheerful yet insecure, she asks Sakuta to pretend to be her boyfriend to avoid gossip. When rumors escalate, she develops genuine feelings after witnessing his unwavering support. These emotions trigger a time loop, explained by Rio as Laplace's demon, forcing her to relive their final day together. After confessing, Sakuta gently rejects her, but they remain friends. Extremely socially conscious, she keeps Sakuta informed of goings on in social media that concern the Adolescence Syndrome cases he encounters. Tomoe also holds a part-time job at the same family restaurant that Sakuta works at.
Rio Futaba (双葉 理央, Futaba Rio)
Voiced by: Atsumi Tanezaki (Japanese); Jenny Yokobori (English)
Rio, the sole member of her high school's science club, is a rational and intelligent student who initially dismisses Adolescence Syndrome as fiction—until experiencing it herself. Though stoic and analytical, she proves to be kind and a loyal friend to Sakuta and Yūma, harboring unspoken feelings for the latter. When her insecurity about her appearance manifests as a rebellious clone posting suggestive photos online, Sakuta helps both versions reconcile. Through this, Rio learns to embrace her true self and the friendships she once doubted. She later attends a national university and works part time at the same cram school as Sakuta.
Nodoka Toyohama (豊浜 のどか, Toyohama Nodoka)
Voiced by: Maaya Uchida (Japanese); Cristina Vee (English)
Nodoka, Mai's half-sister and a member of the idol group Sweet Bullet, temporarily swaps bodies with her due to an inferiority complex. She reverts after realizing she does not need to emulate Mai, with the two reconciling. Though temperamental, Nodoka shows kindness by helping Kaede reintegrate into school life, eventually becoming her closest friend. She later attends the same university as Sakuta and Mai.
Kaede Azusagawa (梓川 かえで / 梓川 花楓, Azusagawa Kaede)
Voiced by: Yurika Kubo (Japanese); Kayli Mills (English)
Kaede, Sakuta's younger sister, develops Adolescence Syndrome after severe online harassment leaves her traumatized and unable to face strangers. Confined to her home with only her cat, she becomes deeply dependent on Sakuta. Her condition manifests through a dissociative disorder that fractures her personality until her original memories return, causing her alternate identity to disappear. Though heartbroken, Sakuta supports her gradual recovery. As she heals, Kaede divides her time between living with her parents in Yokohama and staying with Sakuta in Fujisawa, eventually enrolling in an online high school program and working at the same family restaurant that Sakuta works at.
Shoko Makinohara (牧之原 翔子, Makinohara Shōko)
Voiced by: Inori Minase (Japanese); Risa Mei (English)
Shoko, a middle school student sharing the name of Sakuta's childhood crush, first encounters him during a rainstorm. She later reappears after Kaede's recovery, helping Sakuta cope with his grief over his sister's changed personality. Initially staying temporarily at his home—much to Mai's irritation—her presence unravels a complex temporal paradox. Two versions of Shoko exist: one saved by Sakuta's donated heart after his future death, and another whose survival depends on that event. When Mai dies preventing the accident, Shoko aids Sakuta in altering the past, creating a timeline where they never meet. Their connection endures, however, as Sakuta later recognizes her by the sea and recalls their erased bond. She later moves to Okinawa.

=== Supporting ===
Yūma Kunimi (国見 佑真, Kunimi Yūma)
Voiced by: Yuma Uchida (Japanese); Clifford Chapin (English)
Sakuta's best friend. He is dating Saki Kamisato but they often argue over Yūma's interactions with Sakuta. He also worked in the same family restaurant as Sakuta before leaving the role to become a firefighter. He is kind and friendly, and the only one not affected by Adolescence Syndrome.
Saki Kamisato (上里 沙希, Kamisato Saki)
Voiced by: Himika Akaneya (Japanese); Dawn M. Bennett (English)
Saki is Yūma's girlfriend. She hates Sakuta and wishes he would stop being Yūma's friend, as his status as the class loner is making Yūma, and more importantly, herself, less popular. However, things change as she helps him with Rio Futaba's Adolescence Syndrome case. Two years later, Saki studies nursing at the same university as Sakuta.
Fumika Nanjō (南条 文香, Nanjō Fumika)
Voiced by: Satomi Satō (Japanese); Jennifer Sun Bell (English)
Fumika is a reporter who is interested in Adolescence Syndrome and believes the scars on Sakuta's chest were somehow caused by it.
Uzuki Hirokawa (広川 卯月, Hirokawa Uzuki)
Voiced by: Sora Amamiya (Japanese); Lisa Reimold (English)
Uzuki is the lead singer of the idol group Sweet Bullet, of which Nodoka is also a member. In Rascal Does Not Dream of a Sister Venturing Out, she is revealed to be distance learning at an online school. In Rascal Does Not Dream of Santa Claus, Uzuki initially attends university, enrolled in the same program as Sakuta's, before dropping out to pursue her solo and idol music career.
Minagi Ōtsu (大津 美凪, Ōtsu Minagi)
Voiced by: Akane Fujita
Kaho Hamatsu (浜松 夏帆, Hamatsu Kaho)
Voiced by: Azumi Waki
Ikumi Akagi (赤城 郁実, Akagi Ikumi)
Voiced by: Aya Yamane (Japanese); Ryan Bartley (English)
A first-year nursing student at the same university as Sakuta. She was also in the same class as Sakuta during the third year of middle school, when Sakuta's troubles with Adolescence Syndrome began. In a parallel reality that Sakuta visited in Rascal Does Not Dream of a Knapsack Kid, Ikumi also went to the same high school as Sakuta, in the same homeroom class with him and Saki. Her Adolescence Syndrome manifests due to her disappointment at being unable to help Sakuta during middle school while seeing him at their college matriculation ceremony, causing her to swap places with the parallel reality version of herself, allowing her to communicate between her two versions via physically writing on their own bodies.
Miniskirt Santa (ミニスカ サンタ, Minisuka Santa) / Nene Iwamizawa (岩見沢 寧々, Iwamizawa Nene)
Voiced by: Reina Ueda (Japanese); Maureen Price (English)
A mysterious girl, visible only to Sakuta, who identifies herself as Touko Kirishima (霧島 透子, Kirishima Tōko). She claims responsibility for distributing countless instances of Adolescence Syndrome, including those affecting Uzuki and Ikumi. Sakuta later discovers her true identity of Nene Iwamizawa by consulting a website archiving past winners of his university's beauty pageant. Nene was a successful model from Hokkaido who moved to Tokyo for more work opportunities, enrolling in the same university that Sakuta and Mai eventually did. However, her career did not take off, and after being overshadowed by Mai when she matriculated to university, Nene took on the role of Touko Kirishima to feel more accomplished and successful. Her boyfriend since high school back in Hokkaido was Takumi, but they had forgotten each other as she took on more of the role of Touko Kirishima.
Sara Himeji (姫路 紗良, Himeji Sara)
Voiced by: Konomi Kohara (Japanese); Xanthe Huynh (English)
A first-year student at the same high school as Sakuta, though she only joined after Sakuta graduated; she is also a student at the cram school Sakuta teaches at. She is two years younger than Tomoe. Her Adolescence Syndrome manifests as clairvoyance, being able to see through the eyes of and hear the thoughts of someone she has made physical contact with, after being unable to understand why her childhood friend whom everyone assumed she was dating broke up with her. She uses this to toy with the emotions of males in her presence but admits she is unable to do so to Sakuta after interacting with Mai. After her Adolescence Syndrome is resolved, Sara begins working part-time at the same restaurant that Sakuta, Tomoe and Kaede work at.
Miori Mitō (美東 美織, Mitō Miori)
Voiced by: Manaka Iwami (Japanese); Anjali Kunapaneni (English)
A first-year student at the same university as Sakuta, who first talked to him during an orientation event. She appears to know about Adolescence Syndrome. Sakuta later discovers that Miori can see the miniskirt Santa as well, and is aware of the miniskirt Santa's true identity.

== Production ==
The project originated from Hajime Kamoshida's desire to write a coming-of-age story with a slightly mysterious theme, often depicted in movies released in the summer. He coined the idea of "Adolescence Syndrome" when considering the mystery theme for the novel.

The female characters were conceptualized by imagining bizarre phenomena happening to girls. For example, Mai Sakurajima is designed as an unmissable national celebrity, such that her sudden invisibility creates a stark contrast that adds an element of surprise. Kamoshida stated that this choice also conveniently satisfy the classic male fantasy of dating a famous star. As for the protagonist, Sakuta Azusagawa, he was created as a counterpoint to Sorata Kanda from The Pet Girl of Sakurasou, Kamoshida's previous work. Kamoshida designed Sakuta around the concept of creating someone readers would find cool and charming.

The light novel titles follow the unnumbered format of Rascal Does Not Dream of... (青春ブタ野郎は...の夢を見ない, Seishun Buta Yarō wa... no Yume o Minai). This format was chosen because each volume centers on a different heroine, reflecting Kamoshida's intention to give each featured heroine their moment in the spotlight.

== Media ==
=== Light novel ===
Rascal Does Not Dream is written by Hajime Kamoshida and features illustrations by Keji Mizoguchi. ASCII Media Works published fifteen volumes from April 2014 to October 2024 under their Dengeki Bunko imprint. The original title of each volume is set according to the syntax Rascal Does Not Dream of... (青春ブタ野郎は...の夢を見ない, Seishun Buta Yarō wa... no Yume o Minai). In April 2024, it was announced that the series entered its final arc, with the final volume, volume 15, published on October 10 of the same year.

Yen Press has been publishing light novels in English since April 28, 2020.

No.	Title	Original release date	English release date
1	Rascal Does Not Dream of Bunny Girl Senpai; Seishun Buta Yarō wa Banīgāru Senpai no Yume o Minai (青春ブタ野郎はバニーガール先輩の夢を見ない)	April 10, 2014; 978-4-04-866487-5	April 28, 2020; 978-1-9753-9935-1
Chapter One: "Senpai Is a Bunny Girl"; Chapter Two: "The Price of Making Up"; Chapter Three: "First Dates Are Always Turbulent"; Chapter Four: "Our Memories"; Chapter Five: "A World Without You"; Last Chapter: "And in the Light of Dawn"
2	Rascal Does Not Dream of Petite Devil Kohai; Seishun Buta Yarō wa Puchidebiru Kōhai no Yume o Minai (青春ブタ野郎はプチデビル後輩の夢を見ない)	September 9, 2014; 978-4-04-866808-8	August 18, 2020; 978-1-9753-1254-1
Chapter One: "The Rascal Has No Tomorrow"; Chapter Two: "Do the Winds of Tomorrow Blow Tomorrow?"; Chapter Three: "The Start of a Relationship Lie"; Chapter Four: "All My Lies to You"; Chapter Five: "Laplace's Mini-Demon"; Last Chapter: "The World You Chose"
3	Rascal Does Not Dream of Logical Witch; Seishun Buta Yarō wa Rojikaru Witchi no Yume o Minai (青春ブタ野郎はロジカルウィッチの夢を見ない)	January 10, 2015; 978-4-04-869173-4	November 17, 2020; 978-1-9753-1256-5
Chapter One: "Mystery Calls to Mystery"; Chapter Two: "Youth Is a Paradox"; Chapter Three: "Friendship Travels at 25 mph"; Chapter Four: "A Night of Rain Washes It All Away"; Last Chapter: "All That Remains After the Fireworks Are Summer Memories"
4	Rascal Does Not Dream of Siscon Idol; Seishun Buta Yarō wa Shisukon Aidoru no Yume o Minai (青春ブタ野郎はシスコンアイドルの夢を見ない)	May 9, 2015; 978-4-04-865135-6	March 30, 2021; 978-1-9753-1258-9
Chapter One: "Sister Panic"; Chapter Two: "The Cold War Commences"; Chapter Three: "It's Not a Sister Complex"; Chapter Four: "Complex Congratulations"; Last Chapter: "And the Fall Brings..."
5	Rascal Does Not Dream of a Sister Home Alone; Seishun Buta Yarō wa Orusuban Imōto no Yume o Minai (青春ブタ野郎はおるすばん妹の夢を見ない)	September 10, 2015; 978-4-04-865394-7	July 27, 2021; 978-1-9753-1260-2
Chapter One: "The Rest of That Day Is Today"; Chapter Two: "Kaede Quest"; Chapter Three: "Living a Dream You Can't Wake Up From"; Chapter Four: "Dawn of an Endless Night"; Chapter Five: "And Once More, the Sun Rises"; Last Chapter: "Chance Encounter"
6	Rascal Does Not Dream of a Dreaming Girl; Seishun Buta Yarō wa Yumemiru Shōjo no Yume o Minai (青春ブタ野郎はゆめみる少女の夢を見ない)	June 10, 2016; 978-4-04-865891-1	November 30, 2021; 978-1-9753-1262-6
Chapter One: "Manifestation of a Girl's Dream"; Chapter Two: "Her Future Schedule"; Chapter Three: "Shouko Makinohara"; Chapter Four: "Two Paths"; Chapter Five: "Dye the White Snow"
7	Rascal Does Not Dream of His First Love; Seishun Buta Yarō wa Hatsukoi Shōjo no Yume o Minai (青春ブタ野郎はハツコイ少女の夢を見ない)	October 8, 2016; 978-4-04-892281-4	May 3, 2022; 978-1-9753-1264-0
Chapter One: "A Gray and Desolate Landscape"; Chapter Two: "Before the Snow Stops"; Chapter Three: "No Dreams of His First Love"; Chapter Four: "Kindness, and a Hand Offered in Kind"
8	Rascal Does Not Dream of a Sister Venturing Out; Seishun Buta Yarō wa Dekake Shisutā no Yume o Minai (青春ブタ野郎はおでかけシスターの夢を見ない)	April 10, 2018; 978-4-04-893585-2	August 23, 2022; 978-1-9753-1266-4
Chapter One: "The Rest of That Day"; Chapter Two: "Walking Speed"; Chapter Three: "Open the Door"; Chapter Four: "Dare to Dream"
9	Rascal Does Not Dream of a Knapsack Kid; Seishun Buta Yarō wa Randoseru Gāru no Yume o Minai (青春ブタ野郎はランドセルガールの夢を見ない)	October 10, 2018; 978-4-04-912017-2	December 13, 2022; 978-1-9753-1268-8
Chapter One: "March Cameras Rolling"; Chapter Two: "The Shape of a Bond"; Chapter Three: "A Dream of Happiness"; Chapter Four: "Home"; Intermezzo: "A New Season"
10	Rascal Does Not Dream of a Lost Singer; Seishun Buta Yarō wa Mayoeru Shingā no Yume o Minai (青春ブタ野郎は迷えるシンガーの夢を見ない)	February 7, 2020; 978-4-04-912850-5	March 21, 2023; 978-1-9753-1851-2
Chapter One: "Adolescence Doesn't End"; Chapter Two: "Catching the Wavelength"; Chapter Three: "Social World"; Chapter Four: "Idol Song"; Last Chapter: "Congratulations"
11	Rascal Does Not Dream of a Nightingale; Seishun Buta Yarō wa Naichingēru no Yume o Minai (青春ブタ野郎はナイチンゲールの夢を見ない)	December 10, 2020; 978-4-04-912902-1	June 20, 2023; 978-1-9753-4350-7
Chapter One: "Heroism"; Chapter Two: "Dissonant Notes"; Chapter Three: "Us, in Backup Memories"; Chapter Four: "From Deep in the Hilbert Space"; Last Chapter: "Message"
12	Rascal Does Not Dream of His Student; Seishun Buta Yarō wa Mai Suchūdento no Yume o Minai (青春ブタ野郎はマイスチューデントの夢を見ない)	December 9, 2022; 978-4-04-913936-5	November 21, 2023; 978-1-9753-7527-0
Chapter One: "December Gifts"; Chapter Two: "Secrets and Promises"; Chapter Three: "I Need You"; Chapter Four: "December 24"; Last Chapter: "Holy Night"
13	Rascal Does Not Dream of Santa Claus; Seishun Buta Yarō wa Santakurōsu no Yume o Minai (青春ブタ野郎はサンタクロースの夢を見ない)	July 7, 2023; 978-4-04-914867-1	August 20, 2024; 978-1-9753-9160-7
Chapter One: "The World Dreams"; Chapter Two: "Reindeer's Work"; Chapter Three: "Someone"; Chapter Four: "No Dreams of Santa Claus"; Last Chapter: "The Day Before"
14	Rascal Does Not Dream of His Girlfriend; Seishun Buta Yarō wa Gārufurendo no Yume o Minai (青春ブタ野郎はガールフレンドの夢を見ない)	August 9, 2024; 978-4-04-915131-2	June 10, 2025; 979-8-8554-1829-3
Chapter One: "Dream of an Imitation Lover"; Chapter Two: "Walking Through the Fog"; Chapter Three: "A Butterfly Flaps Its Wings"; Chapter Four: "Two Lines Running Along, Never Crossing"
15	Rascal Does Not Dream of a Dear Friend; Seishun Buta Yarō wa Dia Furendo no Yume o Minai (青春ブタ野郎はディアフレンドの夢を見ない)	October 10, 2024; 978-4-04-915132-9	January 27, 2026; 979-8-8554-2243-6
Chapter One: "Turn the World Upside Down"; Chapter Two: "The Answer Song Rings On"; Chapter Three: "The 22:50 from Fujisawa, Bound for Kamakura"; Last Chapter: "Hello, Good-Bye"
+	Rascal Does Not Dream of a Beach Queen; Seishun Buta Yarō wa Bīchikuīn no Yume o Minai (青春ブタ野郎はビーチクイーンの夢を見ない)	July 10, 2025; 978-4-04-916404-6	August 11, 2026; 979-8-8554-3445-3
"Rascal Does Not Dream of a Beach Queen" (Note: Originally released as bonus content with season 1 Blu-ray box set.); "Rascal Does Dream of a White Christmas" (Note: Originally a freebie during the first week screening of the Dreaming Girl film.); "Rascal Does Not Dream of a Tropical Summer"
+	Rascal Does Not Dream of Doctor Pig; Seishun Buta Yarō wa Dokutā Piggu no Yume o Minai (青春ブタ野郎はドクターピッグの夢を見ない)	October 9, 2026; 978-4-04-916976-8	—
Seishun Buta Yarō wa Animarurando no Yume o Minai (青春ブタ野郎はアニマルランドの夢を見る); Seishun Buta Yarō wa Supuringudeizu no Yume o Minai (青春ブタ野郎はスプリングデイズの夢を見る); Seishun Buta Yarō wa Dokutāpiggu no Yume o Minai (青春ブタ野郎はドクターピッグの夢を見ない)

=== Manga ===
A manga adaptation drawn by Tsugumi Nanamiya began serialization in the January 2016 issue of ASCII Media Works' Dengeki G's Comic magazine, which was released on December 1, 2015. Yen Press has been publishing the English version of the manga in a 2-in-1 omnibus edition since August 18, 2020.

No.	Title	Original release date	English release date
1	Rascal Does Not Dream of Bunny Girl Senpai 1 Seishun Buta Yarō wa Banīgāru Senpai no Yume o Minai 1 (青春ブタ野郎はバニーガール先輩の夢を見ない 1)	October 8, 2016; 978-4-04-892480-1	August 18, 2020; 978-1-9753-5962-1
Chapters 1–8
2	Rascal Does Not Dream of Bunny Girl Senpai 2 Seishun Buta Yarō wa Banīgāru Senpai no Yume o Minai 2 (青春ブタ野郎はバニーガール先輩の夢を見ない 2)	October 10, 2018; 978-4-04-912068-4	August 18, 2020; 978-1-9753-5962-1
Chapters 9–20

A manga adaptation drawn by Tsukumo Asakusa began serialization in the May 2018 issue of Dengeki G's Comic magazine.

No.	Title	Original release date	English release date
1	Rascal Does Not Dream of Petite Devil Kohai 1 Seishun Buta Yarō wa Puchidebiru Kōhai no Yume o Minai 1 (青春ブタ野郎はプチデビル後輩の夢を見ない 1)	October 10, 2018; 978-4-04-912070-7	December 15, 2020; 978-1-9753-1801-7
Chapters 1–6
2	Rascal Does Not Dream of Petite Devil Kohai 2 Seishun Buta Yarō wa Puchidebiru Kōhai no Yume o Minai 2 (青春ブタ野郎はプチデビル後輩の夢を見ない 2)	December 10, 2018; 978-4-04-912258-9	December 15, 2020; 978-1-9753-1801-7
Chapters 7–12

A manga adaptation drawn by Tsukako Akina began serialization on the ComicWalker website on August 1, 2020.

No.	Title	Original release date	English release date
1	Rascal Does Not Dream of Logical Witch 1 Seishun Buta Yarō wa Rojikaru Witchi no Yume o Minai 1 (青春ブタ野郎はロジカルウィッチの夢を見ない 1)	December 26, 2020; 978-4-04-913570-1	November 21, 2023; 978-1-9753-7339-9
Chapters 1–4
2	Rascal Does Not Dream of Logical Witch 2 Seishun Buta Yarō wa Rojikaru Witchi no Yume o Minai 2 (青春ブタ野郎はロジカルウィッチの夢を見ない 2)	July 27, 2022; 978-4-04-913894-8	November 21, 2023; 978-1-9753-7339-9
Chapters 5–11

A manga adaptation drawn by Akuro Yoshibe began serialization on the G's Channel and ComicWalker websites on April 30, 2023.

No.	Title	Original release date	English release date
1	Rascal Does Not Dream of a Sister Home Alone 1 Seishun Buta Yarō wa Orusuban Imōto no Yume o Minai 1 (青春ブタ野郎はおるすばん妹の夢を見ない 1)	November 10, 2023; 978-4-04-915373-6	December 9, 2025; 979-8-8554-2280-1
Chapters 1–6
2	Rascal Does Not Dream of a Sister Home Alone 2 Seishun Buta Yarō wa Orusuban Imōto no Yume o Minai 2 (青春ブタ野郎はおるすばん妹の夢を見ない 2)	August 9, 2024; 978-4-04-915951-6	December 9, 2025; 979-8-8554-2280-1
Chapters 7–12

A manga adaptation drawn by Eranto began serialization on the G's Channel and ComicWalker on April 30, 2023.

No.	Title	Original release date	English release date
1	Rascal Does Not Dream of a Dreaming Girl 1 Seishun Buta Yarō wa Yumemiru Shōjo no Yume o Minai 1 (青春ブタ野郎はゆめみる少女の夢を見ない 1)	October 10, 2023; 978-4-04-915372-9	January 20, 2026; 979-8-8554-2577-2
Chapters 1–4
2	Rascal Does Not Dream of a Dreaming Girl 2 Seishun Buta Yarō wa Yumemiru Shōjo no Yume o Minai 2 (青春ブタ野郎はゆめみる少女の夢を見ない 2)	March 8, 2024; 978-4-04-915640-9	January 20, 2026; 979-8-8554-2577-2
Chapters 5–9
3	Rascal Does Not Dream of a Dreaming Girl 3 Seishun Buta Yarō wa Yumemiru Shōjo no Yume o Minai 3 (青春ブタ野郎はゆめみる少女の夢を見ない 3)	October 10, 2024; 978-4-04-915961-5	January 20, 2026; 979-8-8554-2577-2
Chapters 10–15

A manga adaptation of Rascal Does Not Dream of Siscon Idol, illustrated by Jun Miyazaki, began serialization on the G's Channel on December 25, 2023.

No.	Title	Original release date	English release date
1	Rascal Does Not Dream of a Siscon Idol 1 Seishun Buta Yarō wa Shisukon Aidoru no Yume o Minai 1 (青春ブタ野郎はシスコンアイドルの夢を見ない 1)	June 10, 2025; 978-4-04-916578-4	—
Chapters 1–5
2	Rascal Does Not Dream of a Siscon Idol 2 Seishun Buta Yarō wa Shisukon Aidoru no Yume o Minai 2 (青春ブタ野郎はシスコンアイドルの夢を見ない 2)	May 27, 2026; 978-4-04-952232-7	—
Chapters 6–10

=== Anime ===
A 13-episode anime television series adaptation, titled Rascal Does Not Dream of Bunny Girl Senpai, aired from October 4 to December 27, 2018, on ABC and other networks. (Note: ABC listed the series premiere on October 3, 2018, at 26:20, which is effectively October 4 at 2:20 a.m. JST.) The series is animated by CloverWorks and directed by Sōichi Masui, with Kazuya Iwata as assistant director, Masahiro Yokotani handling series composition, and Satomi Tamura designing the characters. The band Fox Capture Plan composed the series' music. Satomi Tamura also served as the chief animation director along with Akira Takata. It adapts the first five light novel volumes. The opening theme song is "Kimi no Sei" (君のせい; lit. 'Because of You'), performed by The Peggies. while the ending theme song is "Fukashigi no Karte" (不可思議のカルテ; lit. 'Mysterious Chart'), with each arc performed by Asami Seto, Yurika Kubo, Nao Tōyama, Atsumi Tanezaki, Maaya Uchida, and Inori Minase as their respective character names.

An anime film adaptation, titled Rascal Does Not Dream of a Dreaming Girl, premiered on June 15, 2019. The staff and cast reprised their roles from the anime. It adapts the sixth and seventh light novel volumes.

During the Aniplex Online Fest event in September 2022, an anime sequel adapting the eighth and ninth light novel volumes was announced. It was later revealed that the sequel would consist of two films; Rascal Does Not Dream of a Sister Venturing Out, adapting the eighth volume, was released theatrically on June 23, 2023, and Rascal Does Not Dream of a Knapsack Kid, adapting the ninth volume, premiered on December 1 of that same year. Both films reprise the main staff and cast of the previous anime adaptation.

An anime adaptation of the University Student Arc (tenth volume onwards) was announced in December 2023, which was later revealed to be a television series, titled Rascal Does Not Dream of Santa Claus, aired from July 5 to September 27, 2025, on Tokyo MX and other networks, with the staff and cast from the anime series and films reprising their roles. The opening theme song is "Snowdrop", performed by Conton Candy, while the ending theme song is "Suiheisen wa Boku no Furukizu" (水平線は僕の古傷; lit. 'The Horizon Is My Old Wound'), performed by Sora Amamiya, Aya Yamane, Konomi Kohara and Reina Ueda as their respective characters.

An anime film adaptation of the final two light novel volumes was announced in September 2025, titled Rascal Does Not Dream of a Dear Friend, with the staff and cast once again reprising their roles. The film premiered on October 16, 2026. A new version of "Suiheisen wa Boku no Furukizu" is used as the film's theme song.

==== English release ====
Aniplex of America licensed Rascal Does Not Dream of Bunny Girl Senpai, streaming it on Crunchyroll, Hulu, FunimationNow, and Netflix, having released a complete Blu-ray set (with English subtitles) on November 19, 2019. In Australia and New Zealand, the series was simulcast on AnimeLab, and in Southeast Asia on Aniplus Asia. MVM Entertainment acquired the series for distribution in the UK and Ireland.

In addition to the two films that were released subtitled in US theaters by Aniplex of America, in association with Fathom Events on March 24, 2024, an English dub screening of Rascal Does Not Dream of a Sister Venturing Out & Knapsack Kid, commissioned by Burbank-based Bang Zoom! starring Erica Mendez, Stephen Fu and Kayli Mills with ADR direction handled by Michelle Ruff, premiered on March 25, 2024. Aniplex of America released the films individually on Blu-ray in the US in 2024. Crunchyroll streamed both films in English and Japanese on August 2, 2025.

Nearly six years after its premiere, an English dub of Bunny Girl Senpai was announced on August 23, 2024, and premiered on December 3 that same year with the cast of the films reprising their roles.

On June 17, 2025, Aniplex of America announced it would stream Rascal Does Not Dream of a Dreaming Girl on Crunchyroll with the English dub that premiered in December 2024 at Anime Frontier. It released on June 19, 2025, with the cast from the series and other films returning.

On July 25, 2025, Aniplex of America announced it would stream an English dub of Rascal Does Not Dream of Santa Claus on Crunchyroll the next day, with the main cast returning, plus new cast members.

== See also ==
- The Pet Girl of Sakurasou, a light novel series by the same creators
