= Masahiro Yokotani =

Japanese screenwriter

Masahiro Yokotani (横谷 昌宏, Yokotani Masahiro; born August 8, 1964) is a Japanese screenwriter from Osaka Prefecture.

== Screenwriting ==
- series head writer denoted in bold

=== Television ===
- Saint Tail (1996)
- Detective Conan (1997)
- Kasumin (2003)
- Di Gi Charat Nyo! (2003-2004)
- Popolocrois (2003-2004)
- Futakoi (2004)
- The Marshmallow Times (2004-2005)
- **Sgt. Frog** (2004-2011): head writer [eps 104-358]
- Ojarumaru (2004-2014)
- Animal Yokochō (2005)
- Himawari! (2006)
- Silk Road Boy Yuto (2006-2007)
- Nodame Cantabile (2007)
- **Reideen** (2007)
- Les Misérables: Shōjo Cosette (2007)
- Kenkō Zenrakei Suieibu Umishō (2007)
- **Deltora Quest** (2007-2008): head writer [eps 53-65]
- KimiKiss: Pure Rouge (2007-2008)
- Neuro: Supernatural Detective (2008)
- World Destruction: Sekai Bokumetsu no Rokunin (2008)
- Battle Spirits: Shounen Toppa Bashin (2008-2009)
- Toradora! (2008-2009)
- **Maria†Holic** (2009)
- Umi Monogatari (2009)
- Nodame Cantabile Final (2010)
- Dance in the Vampire Bund (2010)
- Maid Sama! (2010)
- K-On!! (2010)
- Black Butler (2010)
- **Beelzebub** (2011-2012)
- **Maria†Holic: Alive** (2011)
- Steins;Gate (2011)
- Nekogami Yaoyorozu (2011)
- Aquarion Evol (2012)
- **Busou Shinki** (2012)
- Accel World (2012)
- Magi: The Labyrinth of Magic (2012)
- Chōsoku Henkei Gyrozetter (2012)
- Robotics;Notes (2012)
- Rock Lee & His Ninja Pals (2012-2013)
- Mangirl! (2013)
- DD Fist of the North Star (2013)
- **The Devil Is a Part-Timer!** (2013-2022)
- **Free! -Iwatobi Swim Club-** (2013)
- Jewelpet Happiness (2013)
- Strike the Blood (2014)
- Riddle Story of Devil (2014)
- Lady Jewelpet (2014)
- **Free! - Eternal Summer** (2014)
- World Trigger (2014)
- **Jewelpet: Magical Change** (2015)
- **Mikagura School Suite** (2015)
- **Shimoneta** (2015)
- Heavy Object (2015)
- **Re:Zero − Starting Life in Another World** (2016, 2020–2021)
- **All Out!!** (2016-2017)
- MARGINAL#4 (2017)
- **Sakura Quest** (2017)
- Kabukibu! (2017)
- How to Keep a Mummy (2017)
- GeGeGe no Kitarō 6th series (2018)
- Nil Admirari no Tenbin: Teito Genwaku Kitan (2018)
- **Free! - Dive to the Future** (2018)
- **Bakumatsu** (2018)
- **Rascal Does Not Dream of Bunny Girl Senpai** (2018)
- **Bakumatsu: Crisis** (2019)
- YU-NO: A Girl Who Chants Love at the Bound of this World (2019)
- Wasteful Days of High School Girls (2019)
- Iwa-Kakeru! Climbing Girls (2020)
- Yu-Gi-Oh! Sevens (2020)
- Mewkledreamy (2020-2022)
- **Tropical-Rouge! Pretty Cure** (2021-2022)
- **Aoashi** (2022)
- **My New Boss Is Goofy** (2023)
- **Too Many Losing Heroines!** (2024)
- **I Have a Crush at Work** (2025)
- You and Idol Pretty Cure (2025)
- **The Klutzy Class Monitor and the Girl with the Short Skirt** (2026)
- **Even the Student Council Has Its Holes!** (2026)

=== Films ===
- Crossfire (2000)
- Oboreru Sakana (2001)
- Godzilla, Mothra and King Ghidorah: Giant Monsters All-Out Attack (2001)
- Godzilla: Tokyo S.O.S. (2003)
- Chō Gekijōban Keroro Gunsō 2: Shinkai no Princess de Arimasu! (2007)
- Keroro Gunso the Super Movie 3: Keroro vs. Keroro Great Sky Duel (2008)
- High Speed! Free! Starting Days (2015)
- Free! Take Your Marks (2017)
- Rascal Does Not Dream of a Dreaming Girl (2019)
- Free! The Final Stroke - Part 1 (2021), co-written with Eisaku Kawanami
- Free! The Final Stroke - Part 2 (2022), co-written with Eisaku Kawanami
- Rascal Does Not Dream of a Sister Venturing Out (2023)
- Rascal Does Not Dream of a Knapsack Kid (2023)
- Ōmuro-ke: Dear Sisters (2024)
- Ōmuro-ke: Dear Friends (2024)
- Rascal Does Not Dream of a Dear Friend (2026)
