= Risa Mei =

American voice actress

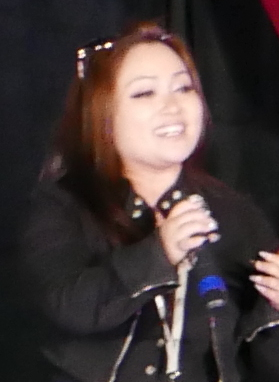
- Mei in 2024
- Education: Azusa Pacific University
- Occupation: Voice actress
- Years active: 2001–present
- Website: www.risamei.com

Risa Mei is an American voice actress, known for her work on video games and English dubs for anime.

== Early life and career ==
Mei started working in entertainment from age 7, after her second grade teacher noticed her singing abilities and a first performance at a school assembly lead to performing regularly both within and outside her school. Mei won "kid champion" on the first episode of Ed McMahon's The Next Big Star, performed on Showtime at the Apollo, and toured around Southern California as part of a local singing and dancing group. She booked her first commercial and landed an agent by age 9. Around this time, Mei discovered she had dwarfism and noticed the roles she was being offered had shifted towards "novelty" roles, and stopped receiving auditions for leading and background roles.

Mei attended Azusa Pacific University, and graduated with a bachelor's in music with a focus on vocal performance. While in college, Mei joined Beckii Cruel's Oishii Project, a Japanese pop idol group. She was also a founding member of 4TE, a Japanese electronic pop girl group, and the lead singer of Psycho Bando, a punk Japanese rock-inspired band.

After graduating, Mei worked as a suit and character actor for Universal Studios Japan on a contract basis, moving back and forth between the US and Japan for several years. When in Japan, Mei performed for shows such as Amazing Sesame Street, One Piece Premiere Shows, and was an atmospheric actor for Universal's Halloween Horror Nights. While in the US, she booked commercials and landed her first motion capture role as Tilly the Tortoise in Word Party.

== Personal life ==
Mei is of Chinese and Indonesian descent. Mei met her husband while working at Universal Studios Japan.

== Filmography ==
=== Animated series ===
List of voice performances in animated series
Year	Title	Role	Notes	Ref.
2016	Word Party	Tilly the Tortoise	Motion capture and voice	
2020	Kakushigoto	Nadila		
2020	Rainbow High	Kim Nguyen		
2021	Shadows House	Rum/Shirley		
2021	Restaurant to Another World	Pakke		
2021	My Senpai Is Annoying	Futaba Igarashi		
2022	Show By Rock!! Stars!!	Rameka		
2022	My Dress-Up Darling	Sajuna Inui		
2023	Heavenly Delusion	Nanaki		
2023	Rurouni Kenshin (2023 TV series)	Kaoru Kamiya		
2024	Delicious in Dungeon	Benichidori		
2024	Undead Unluck	Yusai, Leila Mirah		
2024	Hot Wheels Let's Race	Brights		
2024	Code Geass: Rozé of the Recapture	Oldrin Zevon, Yuri Sano		
2024	Rascal Does Not Dream of Bunny Girl Senpai	Shoko Makinohara		
2025	Medalist	Ryota, Ako Koara		
2025	Blue Box	Gomi, Akari, Une		
2025	Kowloon Generic Romance	Xiaohei		
2025	Digimon Beatbreak	Gekkomon		
2026	Fate/Strange Fake	Philia / Ishtar		
2026	Grow Up Show: Sunflower Circus	Imari Agano		

=== Film ===
List of voice performances in film
Year	Title	Role	Notes	Ref.
2022	Sing a Bit of Harmony	Satomi		
2022	The House of the Lost on the Cape	Hiyori		
2024	Sailor Moon Cosmos	Sailor Lethe		
2025	Virgin Punk: Clockwork Girl	Vespa		
2026	Cocoon	Shiho		

=== Video games ===
List of voice performances in video games
Year	Title	Role	Notes	Ref.
2017	Fire Emblem Heroes	Syrene		
2020	Genshin Impact	Sangonomiya Kokomi		
2022	Arcade Spirits: The New Challengers	Jynx		
2022	Azure Striker Gunvolt 3	Shiron		
2022	Tower of Fantasy	Annabella, Alyss, Gnonno		
2022	Goddess of Victory: Nikke	Folkwang		
2023	Higan: Eruthyll	Eupheria		
2023	Cassette Beasts	Heather		
2023	Loop8: Summer of Gods	Benihime Tenno		
2023	Eternights	Yuna		
2023	Honkai: Star Rail	Lynx		
2023	Reverse: 1999	Anjo Nala		
2023	Sand Land	Beelzebub		
2023	Astral Ascent	Aquarius		
2024	Unicorn Overlord	Melisandre		
2024	Solo Leveling: ARISE	Mirei Amamiya		
2024	Honor of Kings	Nakoruru, Mayene		
2024	Zenless Zone Zero	Burnice White		
2024	Romancing SaGa 2: Revenge of the Seven	Azami		
2025	Lunar: Silver Star Story Complete	Mia Ausa, Royce		
2025	Phantom Brave: The Lost Hero			
2025	Yakuza 0: Director's Cut	Makoto Makimura		
2025	Fantasy Life i: The Girl Who Steals Time	Rouge, Cherry		
2025	Octopath Traveler 0	Laurana		
2025	Everybody's Golf Hot Shots	Lani		
2026	Marvel Tokon: Fighting Souls	Peni Parker	Pending release	
2026	Mobile Legends Bang Bang	Hira (Hirara)		
