= Maru (Heavenly Delusion) =

Fictional character from Heavenly Delusion

- Heavenly Delusion character
- Maru as drawn by Masakazu Ishiguro
- First appearance: Heavenly Delusion #1, "Tokio" (2018)
- Created by: Masakazu Ishiguro
- Voiced by: Japanese: Gen Satō; English: Jonathan Leon

Maru (Japanese: マル) is a fictional character and protagonist from Masakazu Ishiguro's manga series Heavenly Delusion. Maru is an orphan who was given a mission by his dying caretaker Mikura to travel across Japan to find "Heaven" and find a person who possesses an identical face to hand over a cure. He is accompanied by the bodyguard, Kiruko, whom he is attracted to despite her claims that she is actually a boy who had his brain transplanted into his sister's body. Nevertheless, they develop a strong bond in their journey as they battle giant creatures that they call either man-eaters or Hirukos with Maru possessing the talent to destroy them by making contact with their cores that Kiruko names "Maru Touch" (マルタッチ). Maru's supernatural ability is also notable due to his surprising fighting skills which are later revealed to be connected with his origins from Heaven (The Takahara Academy) who used to experiment on teenagers.

Maru was based on Kona, a character Ishiguro wrote in a previous work, And Yet the Town Moves. He wanted to reuse the character after seeing an interview with Hirohiko Araki, regarding his continuous works in Jojo's Bizarre Adventure. Maru's relationship with Kiruko was inspired by buddy films and stories about siblings though Ishiguro suggested a more romantic idea since the series' beginning. In the anime adaptation, Maru is voiced by Gen Satō in Japanese and Jonathan Leon in English. The character was generally well-received due to his adventures with Kiruko and the bond they share. Maru's origins were also the subject of mystery in regard to his similarities with fellow character, Tokio and their possible connection.

== Creation ==
Kona's design from And Yet the Town Moves was an influence on Maru.

While manga artist Masakazu Ishiguro started writing Heavenly Delusion in 2018, he first revealed a teaser in late 2017 featuring the designs of Maru and fellow character, Tokio. The sibling-like dynamic of the duo of Maru and Kiruko was based on Ishiguro's personal life. He was inspired by an event when he noticed a person who was interested in his sister. Another aspect of the protagonists' dynamic was inspired by buddy films. Ishiguro was always inspired by stories of brothers and sisters, so he wanted to create his own story about a brother and sister swapping places, where the brother takes care of the sister. He rejected stories with supernatural elements and instead wanted the body swapping to be more realistic and accurate world to show what happens during a brain transplant. Another theme involves how relationships would change if somebody's sex changed such as Maru's feelings towards Kiruko's gender identity. He often writes metaphorical situations with Kiruko's menstrual cycle being caused by clashing with Maru's lips when awakening from a hallucination from a Hiruko's attack.

Despite Ishiguro's fascination with siblings, Maru and Kiruko are not blood relatives. Nevertheless, Ishiguro wanted to make Maru affectionally call Kiruko 'sis'. While Maru is often protected by Kiruko, Ishiguro decided to give Maru a strong fighting ability to compensate for such weakness. This helped Ishiguro to keep writing Heavenly Delusion as a buddy film. Maru's design was inspired by Ishiguro's series And Yet the Town Moves, specifically a character, Kon. The style is different from before, and Ishiguro thought he would stop reusing characters this time. However, after reading Hirohiko Araki's comments about his character designs in the story arc JoJolion where the author decided to keep writing Jojo's Bizarre Adventure. This interview motivated Ishiguro to keep using the Kon designs in Maru's in a similar fashion as JoJolion. Another influence was the manga Akira by Katsuhiro Otomo who makes heavy emphasis on a post-apocalyptic world that Ishiguro wants to create in calm scenes involving Maru interacting with Kiruko while having meals. In the beginning, Maru has feelings for Kiruko without knowing that his bodyguard is a boy inside a girl's body. Ishiguro called this premise as "transsexual sci-fi", alluding to the possibility of Maru still loving Kiruko despite knowing the truth.

=== Anime adaptation ===
Writer Makoto Fukami noted the constant banters between Kiruko and Maru important for the plot setting, so they avoided trimming them in the television adaptation. Director Hirotaka Mori thought Maru is a "very pure character but ignorant of the world" when the series begins. Mori finds him attractive but got the impression that Maru gradually gains an ego as if there is little he knows about the past. On the other hand, Kiruko is in a complicated situation with Maru, and has a past that is too heavy for her to handle alone. As a result, he enjoys the two and thinks it is a mutually complementary relationship. Maru's action sequences were animated by Tetsuya Takeuchi who wishes to match wuxia-like choreography with active camerawork. He was also assisted by Ryo Araki.

==== Casting ====
Gen Satō, Maru's Japanese voice actor, found that while Maru expresses several emotions, not much about him is known so it was difficult for him to voice the character. During the first episode, Satō said that it was difficult to create Maru's character, in the sense that his character's position and his personality are different. As a result, Sato was conscious of just talking reflexively. He tried to bring out a certain emptiness in him by acting as if Maru was reacting to what came to his impression. Ishiguro told him that the anime's take was identical to how he envisioned the manga and thus was glad he managed to give Maru normal conversations. Both Sato and Kiruko's actor were enthusiastic when recording fight scenes, but the director told them to remain casual to reveal to the audience that both Maru and Kiruko are used to deal with delinquents or man-eaters.

Meanwhile, Jonathan Leon said he enjoyed dubbing the character in English finding him "cool". Despite how dark the plot tends to be, Leon said he came to find Maru appealing for always retaining his smile and often jokes with Kiruko on topics which he relates to. He also finds the character hilarious, especially when Maru jumps to pick a battery for Kiruko's gun under the condition she will let him touch her cleavage.

== Role in Heavenly Delusion ==
Maru is a teenager who is on mission in Japan to find "heaven" after being given an item to hand over to a person who has the same face as him. His dying caretaker Mikura requests the bodyguard, Kiruko, to be his companion whom he affectionately calls "sis". Kiruko uses her skills with Mikura's gun to protect Maru who is capable to easily beat up adults in hand-to-hand combat much to Kiruko's surprise. They also often encounter huge creatures known as man-eaters that Maru can exterminate by getting close to them and destroying their cores. This ability is called "Maru Touch" by Kiruko. As Maru stops caring about reaching Heaven, he instead confesses to Kiruko that he likes her which results in her rejection when she confesses that she is actually a man, Haruki Takehaya, who has had his brain transplanted into the body of his sister Kiriko. Maru and Kiruko still continue their journey on friendly terms and learn from a man named Juichi that Heaven might be the former academy Takahara. Juichi gives them a van to travel which they named Kirukomaru Mark II. Kiruko also reveals her intentions of meeting her friend Robin Inazaki in the journey which causes them to split paths once they reach his current hometown. Unable to wait for his partner, Maru enters to Robin's territory by force and is shocked when discovering Kiruko has been violated by the man. Maru proceeds to beat down Robin, leaving him nearly dead but he is stopped by Kiruko. In the aftermath, Maru confesses his love to Kiruko again claiming he does not care at all about their past identity or gender since he still fell for Kiruko. The duo continue their journey together, though Kiruko is still traumatized and claims she does not deserve Maru.

After several encounters with man-eaters, Maru and Kiruko meet a woman named Michika Takezuka from Takahara, who wants to challenge Maru to a fight in exchange of information. The characters have two fights in which the first one ends with Michika easily defeating Maru and Michika giving up in the second as it is revealed both possess a talent in battle capable of predicting each other's moves. Before leaving, Michika claims that both Maru and him are Hirukos; creatures similar to man-eaters and much to Kiruko's confusion. After recovering, Maru meets a doctor from Takahara who also transplanted Kiruko's brain, Teruhiko Sawatari. Shocked by his physical appearance, the doctor reveals that Maru originates from Takahara and that his parents are two former students, Tokio and Kona, and also had another child named Yamato. When he was born, the doctor marked Maru's body a circle which led him to be named Maru as it is "circle" in Japanese. After protecting the city from another man-eater, Maru and Kiruko are given a robot with the location of Takahara and the location of Maru's family. In their journey, Kiruko asks Maru to stop by Osaka to find other people from her orphanage.

== Reception ==
Critical response to Maru's character has been positive. In the book Critical Posthumanities, Maru is called a "posthuman character" based on the commentaries from Francesca Fernando. Maru possesses an outstanding physical shape that allows to fight older people all alone and easily recover from wounds that do not work on common people like regrowing a tooth he loses when being attacked. Maru stands out as one of the first humans born with the nature to eliminate Hirukos just like him. Moreover, Maru's design includes a black jacket that contains "We are neither machines nor game pieces". This comes across as a visual resistance throughout the series against the non-consensual corruption of the children who suffer traumas while dealing with their supernatural abilities given by the doctors from the Takahara Academy. One of the series' biggest mysteries is Maru's physical similarities with the Takahara student Tokio. CBR theorized Ishiguro was hiding the fact they are son and mother by tricking the viewers that both Maru's journey and the activities in Takahara occur at the same time. After Tokio and Kona become intimate Tokio gives birth to two babies also sharing a similar appearance with the possibility of Maru being one of them. Maru's power to destroy man-eaters was also compared with abilities the Takahara students are born with and the fact that all of them are doomed to become man-eaters. This further reinforces that Maru is related by Takahara's students but unlike them, he possesses a more stable body that will not mutate and instead can kill others of his kind. With the eventual revelation that Kiruko is a young man who had his brain transplanted to his sister's body, the website Anime Feminist still found Maru likable when confessing his feelings to Kiruko and not sounding homophobic in response to the twist.

Anime News Network praised the relationship between Maru and Kiruko for how caring they are with one another. Anime Feminist agreed Maru with Anime News Network while enjoying the similarities he has with Tokio from the Heaven narrative. Clarin and Meristation compared the anime to the video game The Last of Us for the post-apocalypse setting it provides with the main duo exploring areas like its two protagonists, Ellie and Joel. IGN India directly called the duo's journey as one of the best parts of the anime. The Philippine Star praised the series for focusing on gender dysphoria through the relationship between Maru and Kiruko without queerbaiting audiences similar to "switcheroos" like Ranma ½ and Sailor Moon. Game Rant said that while the comedy between Maru and Kiruko always works, the sixth episode makes their sexual themes uncomfortable to the audience as during an action sequence. Kiruko offers Maru that she will let him touch her cleavage if he hands over a battery needed to battle an enemy. The following scenes where the two start arguing about the favor were the subject of criticism by the writer especially in contrast to Tokio and Kona's relationship which is calmly handled when the two become intimate. For the series' finale, Maru's beatdown against Robin Inazaki was praised by the website for giving the audience a sense of satisfaction when the teenager nearly kills the adult as a revenge for the sexual assault on Kiruko. This also led to praise for the sequence animated by Tetsuya Takeuchi for making the beatdown properly earned. Maru's eventual confession to Kiruko was also well-received as he claims that he fell in love with her regardless of gender or identity Kiruko wishes to choose which also parallels the romantic interactions between Mimihime and Shiro. Anime News Network agreed in regards to Maru's declaration of protection and love to Kiruko is well devlivered as it comforts Kiruko who accepts their current identity, a common theme in the series. This declaration makes the duo more fitting to be a romantic couple, according to the writer.
