= Kiruko =

Fictional character from Heavenly Delusion

- Heavenly Delusion character
- Kiruko as drawn by Masakazu Ishiguro
- First appearance: Heavenly Delusion #2, "Maru" (2018)
- Created by: Masakazu Ishiguro
- Voiced by: Japanese: Sayaka Senbongi; English: Anjali Kunapaneni

Kiruko (Japanese: キルコ) is a fictional character from the manga series Heavenly Delusion, created by Masakazu Ishiguro. Kiruko works alongside their partner Maru as a bodyguard job around Japan to reach an area known as Heaven. The character's true identity is Haruki Takehaya (竹早 春希, Takehaya Haruki), an orphan who was raised by his sister Kiriko and had his brain transplanted to her body to survive after suffering severe wounds from fighting a "man-eater" creature. Both Kiruko and Maru are able to defeat these creatures with Kiruko relying on the gun he names "Kiru-Beam" (キル光線, Kiru Kōsen).

When creating Kiruko, Ishiguro was inspired by stories of brothers and sisters; he was aiming to write a story in which the siblings swapped bodies. In contrast to previous stories he read, Ishiguro wanted Kiruko's body change to be written in a realistic manner. The relationship between Kiruko and Maru was one of the most important things Ishiguro found writing. In the anime adaptation of Heavenly Delusion, Kiruko was voiced by Sayaka Senbongi in Japanese and Anjali Kunapaneni in English.

The character was given a positive critical response for the serious portrayal to their gender identity and bond with Maru, with whom Kiruko forms an appealing relationship that acts as a counterpart to parallel stories involving other students from Heaven.

== Creation ==
Scrapped design of Kiruko in the Monthly Comic Ryū magazine.

Heavenly Delusion manga author Masakazu Ishiguro does not remember when the idea of a girl's body containing the brain of her younger brother came to him, but he still wanted to tell this story. He was inspired by stories of brothers and sisters, and wanted to create his own story about a brother and sister swapping places, and the brother taking care of the sister. Ishiguro rejected coincidences related to magic and wanted to create a more-realistic world to show what happens during a brain transplant with Kiruko. Furthermore, the author was opposed to the idea of a man turning into a woman, leading to jokes about cleavage and lacking a penis. With Kiruko, he wanted the scenario to be realistic. Another theme is the change in relationships in the event of a person's sex changing. Ishiguro often writes metaphorical situations; for example, Kiruko's menstrual cycle is caused by a clash with Maru's lips when awakening from a hallucination.

The sibling-like dynamic between Maru and Kiruko is based on Ishiguro's personal life. He was inspired by an event in which he noticed a person who was interested in his sister. Buddy films also inspired the protagonists' dynamic. While Maru has feelings for Kiruko without knowing his bodyguard is a man inside a woman's body; Ishiguro called this premise "transsexual sci-fi", alluding to the possibility of Maru still loving Kiruko despite knowing the truth. When asked about the portrayal of the protagonist, Ishiguro said Kiruko represents a gradation of spiritual sexuality.

Kiruko's design changed from original previews as Ishiguro drew them in the manga magazine Monthly Comic Ryū, where the design had a different hair color and hairstyle. Ishiguro was experimenting to see what how the character would look on the cover of a magazine if this manga was serialized. Unlike the characters from And Yet the Town Moves, Kiruko was based on Ishiguro's ideal type of woman. When drawing Kiruko, Ishiguro enjoys illustrating their face, especially the line that is created by the hollows under the eyes and the step of the cheekbones. He always thought this area cannot be expressed in a drawing. The step between the cheeks and the eye sockets is more expressed by the angle compared to when viewed from the front. Besides enjoying their hairstyle, Ishiguro said the design came from his ideal-older-sister style. While not meant to be read sexually, Ishiguro visualized the series by thinking of a man living with an older woman like an elder sister whom he regards as attractive.

The writer of the series' animated adaptation, Makoto Fukami, noted the constant banter between Kiruko and Maru is important for the plot setting and avoided trimming it. The director Hirotaka Mori thought Maru meets Kiruko from a place where he does not know his own past, and gradually gains an ego due to meeting her. Kiruko is in a complicated relationship with Maru, and has a past that is too heavy to handle alone. As a result, Mori enjoys the two and thinks it is a mutually complementary relationship.

The hints about Kiruko's identity are drawn from the first episode; Mori is glad if the audience can see it from several perspectives, such as curiosity about the mystery or liking the world view of Maru and Kiruko traveling through the ruins. Ishiguro believes Production I.G made Kiruko more sexually appealing than his own version.

=== Casting ===
While voicing Kiruko in the original Japanese series, Sayaka Senbongi was excited because she knew of the manga and liked the character. Senbongi was confused by the script, leading her to read the manga on her own to understand the story. It was important for Kiruko to be natural, according to Senbongi; she thought if she followed the fundamental feelings of "what do you want to do" and "what do you find fun" at each moment, she would naturally connect with the character.

Despite the tension action tends to give, Senbongi and Maru's actor, Gen Satō, were told to act such sequences in a casual fashion. This was mostly to show Kiruko and Maru were already skilled at dealing with such situations like burglars and man-eaters.

By the third episode of the anime, Senbongi said a lot of important information about her character was revealed, making them easier to understand. The actor expressed joy if the viewer pays attention to the relationship between Maru and Kiruko, what will happen to other relationships, and Maru's fate. Ishiguro praised Senbongi's work in the fifth episode when delivering Kiruko's mental breakdown, having added new lines to the anime.

Kiruko's English voice actor Anjali Kunapaneni said they became attached to their character while recording the episodes, and noted how friendly Kiruko becomes with Maru on their journey. They were impressed by how strong they are despite their youth, and keep jumping between several destroyed cities. Despite finding the story sad, Kunapaneni said they found the dynamic between the leads helped to give the anime a hopeful feeling. A scene that attracted them was the discovery Haruki is actually the brother living inside's Kiruko's body; according to them, this scene imparts ideas about identity and hidden depths to the protagonist. Kunapaneni tries to remember the voices of Haruki and Kiriko. They came to regard Kiruko as a superhero due to how way of living but also childish due to Maru's impact on them.

== Role in Heavenly Delusion ==
Kiruko first appears in Heavenly Delusion taking the appearance of a young girl who is guarding the teenager Maru while searching for a place known as Heaven after the death of his caretaker Mikura. Mikura had entrusted Maru's safety and a mysterious gun to Kiruko. Calling it Kiru-Beam, Kiruko uses this gun's power to protect Maru and herself during the journey while acting as a team to defeat giant Man Eaters who are attacking people; Maru has an unknown ability to instantly kill them on contact once psychically reaching their inner cores in battle; Kiruko labels it "Maru Touch". When Maru falls in love with Kiruko on their journey, Kiruko claims they are actually a boy trapped in their sister's body.

Kiruko's true identity is Haruki Takehaya who was raised by her sister Kiriko, in an orphanage. The older sister, Kiriko, was a successful electro-kart racer while her younger brother Haruki hung out with the much-older Robin Inazaki, who was the leader of a group fighting man-eaters, while helping the child to be a stronger fighter to protect Kiriko. One day during a race, a man-eater attacks Haruki and Kiriko tries to save him. Haruki later wakes up in a hospital, but realizes he had Kiriko's body after the doctor operated on them. Months later, Haruki tries to find out what happened but the orphanage and everyone she knew is gone. As a result, Haruki became an odds job and takes the name Kiruko. During their journey, Kiruko and Maru form a strong bond and continue fighting man-eaters.

They meet a man named Juichi who offers and upon meeting their people, they are given a van, which they call "Kirukomaru Mark II". In the Ministry of Reconstruction, Kiruko discovers that Robin is there. At the appointed time, Kiruko goes alone to tell Robin they are really Haruki in Kiriko's body, which causes Robin to suspect a man named Sakota did the operation. Robin handcuffs and rapes Kiruko, who suffers an identity crisis. However, Maru saves Kiruko, nearly killing the man in the process. Maru again confesses his love to Kiruko to protect them but Kiruko hates the way she let Robin violate their sister's body and cannot let Maru stay with them.

When resting in a town, Kiruko meets Teruhiko Sakota, who transplanted her brain years ago after Kiriko was shot in the head. When Sakota sees Maru, he claims Heaven is Takahara Academy, where Maru was conceived and born until being taken to Mikura. Finally having a lead about Heaven's location, the duo continue their journey but Kiruko visits Osaka to find a Funayama Orphanage. There, they meet a man named Toru Funayama, who recognizes Kiruko as Kiriko, who he believes was killed by Robin before the orphanage was abandoned.

== Reception ==
Several critics commented on Kiruko's backstory and gender identity. Anime News Network said the series appears to heavily focus on the gender, not on Kiruko's "experience of trans men, but rather as means of interrogating and playing with rigid gender constructs in a more generalized sense". They praised the relationship between Maru and Kiruko for caring as they are together and noted the flashback's incestuous appealed due to the way it was handled. With the revelation Kiruko is a young man whose brain has been transplanted into his sister's body, the reviewer from the same site was optimistic about the handling of the main characters. They were troubled by the repercussions of this twist in regards to Kiruko's feelings.

GameRant said Kiruko's backstory "nails body horror" for Haruki's wounds when facing a Man-eater and because of the shock of having the brain moved to Kiriko's body. In the book Critical Posthumanities, Kiruko is seen as a "human chimera" due to the nature of their life after surgery and both Maru, and they come across as "transhuman" and "posthuman" by nature, with Maru also standing out as one of the first humans born with the nature to eliminate Hirukos creatures just like him. The writer calls Kiruko "a new person born out of the combination of two bodies and yet a separate existence from them". Clarin and Meristation compared Kiruko's and Maru's story to the video game The Last of Us for the post-apocalypse setting and the two protagonists exploring areas like the game's characters Ellie and Joel.

Several sites praised the relationship between Kiruko and Maru as it develops the more time they share together. Comic Book Resources (CBR) also noted the series' gender norms due to how "complex" they found Maru and Kiruko's relationship because Maru retains his affection toward Kiruko despite knowing the apparent young woman was originally a young man, while Kiruko was compared to a transgender character who is trying to accept the idea of having a female body. The Philippine Star praised the focus on gender dysphoria through the relationship between Maru and Kiruko without queerbaiting audiences. On the other hand, Game Rant said while the comedy between Maru and Kiruko always works, the sixth episode makes their sexual themes uncomfortable to the audience because for interactions involving Kiruko allowing Maru to touch their cleaveage.

For the anime's finale, there were mixed feelings about Kiruko being raped by Robin. Game Rant said leads the teenager into an existential crisis about their identity or gender as Robin tortures them by reminding them of their previous persona. The writer noted Maru's proper love declaration to Kiruko is also comforting because due to Maru reassuring he loves them by who they are rather than previous identities. Anime News Network said the scene in the anime in which Robin violates Kiruko was poorly handled when compared to the manga; Kiruko quickly recovers while in the anime and responds to Maru's feelings whereas in the manga they remain traumatized. Regardless of version, the writer said Maru's declaration of protection and love to Kiruko is well delivered as it comforts Kiruko, and deepens their bond.
