= List of Heavenly Delusion characters =

The Heavenly Delusion manga series features an extensive cast of characters created by Masakazu Ishiguro.

== Main ==
=== Maru ===
Voiced by: Gen Satō (Japanese); Jonathan Leon (English)

Maru (マル) is a 15-year-old boy who is traveling together with Kiruko. He is skilled in martial arts.

=== Kiruko ===
Voiced by: Sayaka Senbongi (Japanese); Anjali Kunapaneni (English)

Kiruko (キルコ) is a young woman around 18 to 20 years old who travels with Maru. She is searching for both the doctor who performed an operation on her and a friend she knew.

==== Kiriko Takehaya ====
Voiced by: Sayaka Senbongi (Japanese); Anjali Kunapaneni (English)

Kiriko Takehaya (竹早 桐子, Takehaya Kiriko) is Haruki's older sister who raced electric cars in Tokyo.

==== Haruki Takehaya ====
Voiced by: Mariya Ise (Japanese); McKenzie Atwood (English)

Haruki Takehaya (竹早 春希, Takehaya Haruki) is Kiriko's younger brother who looks up to Robin Inazaki.

== Takahara Academy ==
=== Tokio ===
Voiced by: Hibiku Yamamura (Japanese); Brittany Lauda (English)

Tokio (トキオ) is part of the second generation of children living at the Takahara Academy facility on Izukunoe Island. She is a young girl who lives in a facility isolated from the outside world. She has a similar appearance as Maru.

=== Kona ===
Voiced by: Toshiyuki Toyonaga (Japanese); AJ Beckles (English)

Kona (コナ) is part of the first generation of children living at the Takahara Academy facility on Izukunoe Island.He is the oldest of the facility children who is a talented artist, although his drawings seem peculiar.

=== Mimihime ===
Voiced by: Misato Fukuen (Japanese); Tia Ballard (English)

Mimihime (ミミヒメ) is part of the second generation of children living at the Takahara Academy facility on Izukunoe Island. She is a socially inept girl who seems to be clairvoyant.

=== Shiro ===
Voiced by: Shunsuke Takeuchi (Japanese); Hao Feng (English)

Shiro (シロ) is part of the second generation of children living at the Takahara Academy facility on Izukunoe Island. He is an observant, tech-savvy boy who seems to be attracted to Mimihime.

=== Taka ===
Voiced by: Yuuki Shin (Japanese); John Choi (English)

Taka (タカ) is part of the second generation of children living at the Takahara Academy facility on Izukunoe Island. He is a very athletic and energetic child.

=== Anzu ===
Voiced by: Misato Matsuoka (Japanese); Courtney Lin (English)

Anzu (アンズ) is part of the second generation of children living at the Takahara Academy facility on Izukunoe Island. She is a girl who loves to dance and swim.

=== Kuku ===
Voiced by: Tomoyo Kurosawa (Japanese); Madeleine Morris (English)

Kuku (クク) is part of the third generation of children living at the Takahara Academy facility on Izukunoe Island. She is very agile and curious.

=== Tarao ===
Voiced by: Kei Shindō (Japanese); Xanthe Huynh (English)

Tarao (タラオ) is part of the third generation of children living at the Takahara Academy facility on Izukunoe Island. He is a young boy close to Tokio who is suffering from a debilitating disease.

=== Michika ===
Voiced by: Mai Nishikawa (Japanese); Kayli Mills (English)

Michika (ミチカ) is part of the third generation of children living at the Takahara Academy facility on Izukunoe Island. She has enhanced physical capabilities and a beastly nature.

=== Iwa ===
Voiced by: Satomi Kobashi (Japanese); Felecia Angelle (English)

Iwa (イワ) is part of the third generation of children living at the Takahara Academy facility on Izukunoe Island. She is a young girl who is attracted to her classmate Nanaki. They are often seen kissing each other.

=== Nanaki ===
Voiced by: Ayano Shibuya (Japanese); Risa Mei (English)

Nanaki (ナナキ) is part of the third generation of children living at the Takahara Academy facility on Izukunoe Island. She is a young girl who is attracted to her classmate Iwa. They are often seen kissing each other.

=== Asura ===
Voiced by: Mamiko Noto (Japanese); Ell (English)

Asura (アスラ) is part of the first generation of children living at the Takahara Academy facility on Izukunoe Island. She is one of the children with an unsettling appearance, with healing and telekinetic capabilities, who was close to Kona when they were younger.

=== Ohma ===
Voiced by: Hina Kino (Japanese); Madeline Dorroh (English)

Ohma (オーマ, Ōma) is part of the fifth generation of children living at the Takahara Academy facility on Izukunoe Island. She is a young timid girl who avoids the other children due to her power causing intense hallucinations upon eye contact.

=== Nata ===
Voiced by: Riho Sugiyama (Japanese); Jennifer Losi (English)

Nata (ナタ) is part of the fourth generation of children living at the Takahara Academy facility on Izukunoe Island. She gets tangled up in the adults' scheme at the academy.

=== Mako ===
Voiced by: Ayu Matsuura (Japanese); Caitlyn Elizabeth (English)

Mako (マコ) is part of the fourth generation of children living at the Takahara Academy facility on Izukunoe Island. He has the ability to compress and disintegrate matter.

=== Sakuya ===
Voiced by: Haruna Mikawa (Japanese); Abbey Veffer (English)

Sakuya (サクヤ) is part of the fourth generation of children living at the Takahara Academy facility on Izukunoe Island. She has the ability to scan the area around her, even seeing through objects.

=== Momoika ===
Momoika (モモイカ) is part of the fifth generation of children living at the Takahara Academy facility on Izukunoe Island. She seems to have premonitions powers.

=== Laima ===
Laima (ライマ, Raima) is part of the third generation of children living at the Takahara Academy facility on Izukunoe Island. His best friend is Hani.

=== Hani ===
Hani (ハニ) is part of the third generation of children living at the Takahara Academy facility on Izukunoe Island. His best friend is Laima.

=== Nonoko ===
Nonoko (ノノコ) is part of the fourth generation of children living at the Takahara Academy facility on Izukunoe Island. She is a young girl who questions her sexuality.

=== Shino Kaminaka ===
Voiced by: Masako Isobe (Japanese); Anzu Lawson (English)

Shino Kaminaka (上仲 詩乃, Kaminaka Shino) is the elderly director of the facility.

=== Mina / i373 ===
Voiced by: Aya Hisakawa (Japanese); Lisa Ortiz (English)

Mina (ミーナ) is the artificial intelligence running the facility.

=== Yuko Aoshima ===
Voiced by: Atsumi Tanezaki (Japanese); Jennifer Sun Bell (English)

Yuko Aoshima (青島 裕子, Aoshima Yūko) is a nurse and interpreter in the facility who gets promoted to assistant director.

=== Teruhiko Sawatari ===
Voiced by: Tadashi Mutō (Japanese); Nick Martineau (English)

Teruhiko Sawatari (猿渡, Sawatari Teruhiko) is and a high-ranking executive and a genius doctor working in the facility.

=== Eikichi Kaminaka ===
Voiced by: Kōsuke Echigoya

Eikichi Kaminaka (上仲 永吉, Kaminaka Eikichi) is the husband of Takahara Academy's director, Shino Kaminaka. He is also a high-ranking executive within the academy.

=== Nobuo Shimazaki ===
Voiced by: Takeru Yagi (Japanese); John Omohundro (English)

Nobuo Shimazaki (島崎 信夫, Shimazaki Nobuo) is a high-ranking executive and technician within the academy. After the attack on the facility, he took care of Maru with Kondo.

=== Kondo ===
Voiced by: Takeshi Hirabayashi (Japanese); Brandon McInnis (English)

Kondo (近藤, Kondō) is a technician within the academy. After the attack on the facility, he took care of Maru with Nobuo Shimazaki.

== The Outside ==
=== Robin Inazaki ===
Voiced by: Kazuya Nakai (Japanese); Eric Vale (English)

Robin Inazaki (稲崎 露敏, Inazaki Robin) is Kiruko's childhood friend and a sort of mentor who went missing years ago.

=== Ran Kawashima ===
Voiced by: Kanon Amane (Japanese); Cristina Valenzuela (English)

Ran Kawashima (川島 蘭, Kawashima Ran) is an odd and cheerful child who lived with Haruki at Funayama Orphanage.

=== Ken Tachibana ===
Voiced by: Kōhei Amasaki (Japanese); Harrison Xu (English)

Ken Tachibana (立花 健, Tachibana Ken) is one of Haruki's childhood friends, who lived in Funayama Orphanage.

=== Toru Funayama ===
Toru Funayama (船山 通, Funayama Toru) is a tall and imposing, but actually kind man who founded Funayama Orphanage, where Haruki, Kiriko and Robin grew up.

=== Marin Inazaki ===
Marin Inazaki (稲崎 真凛, Inazaki Marin) is Robin's younger sister who died prior to the end of the world.

=== Totori ===
Voiced by: Misato Matsuoka (Japanese); Deneen Melody (English)

Totori (トトリ) is a young girl who works with bandits in trapping and robbing people.

=== Mizuhashi ===
Voiced by: Seiko Tamura (Japanese); Marcy Edwards (English)

Mizuhashi (水橋, Mizuhashi) is the leader of the Liviumen cult, who are disgruntled by technology replacing their body, supposedly in the name of human experiments.

=== Kuwata ===
Voiced by: Yutaka Aoyama (Japanese); Brook Chalmers (English)

Kuwata (桑田, Kuwata) is one of Mizuhashi's right-hand man, who has an agenda of his own.

=== Yoneda ===
Voiced by: Kōichi Sōma

Yoneda (米田, Yoneda) is one of Mizuhashi's right-hand man, who will help him escape when the attacks against the Immortal Order begin.

=== Juichi ===
Voiced by: Shunsuke Sakuya (Japanese); Jonah Scott (English)

Juichi (ジューイチ, Jūichi) A scavenger and con artist with a dark past who encounters Maru and Kiruko during their travels. He is searching for his son Jugo.

=== Jugo ===
Voiced by: Ayano Shibuya (Japanese); Abbey Veffer (English)

Jugo (十五, Jūgo) is Juichi's son. He has freezing powers.

=== Helm ===
Helm (ヘルム, Herumu) is a 16–17 year old girl who travels alone with the goal of taking revenge on a man.

=== Priyanka Azuma ===
Priyanka Azuma (吾妻 プリヤンカ, Azuma Puriyanka) was Maru's Japanese-Indian teacher and first love during his time studying in a village in Uonuma, Niigata Prefecture.

== Ministry of Reconstruction ==
=== Sakae ===
Voiced by: Chiharu Sawashiro

Sakae (坂江, Sakae) is a member of the Ministry of Reconstruction of Ibaraki responsible for finding Maru and Kiruko, suspected of having helped Robin in his escape.

=== Heima ===
Heima (平馬, Heima) is a member of the Ministry of Reconstruction of Ibaraki responsible for finding Maru and Kiruko, suspected of having helped Robin in his escape.

=== Oikawa ===
Voiced by: Keisuke Misaizu

Oikawa (及川, Oikawa) is one of the chiefs of the Ministry of Reconstruction of Ibaraki. He is supervising the case surrounding Robin Inazaki's escape from his Ministry of Reconstruction duties.

=== Sato ===
Sato (佐藤, Satō) is a member of the Ministry of Reconstruction of Nara, working at the anti-Anjulas operations center. He is better known as Broadsword Sato.
