= Heavenly Delusion (TV series) =

2023 anime series

- Key visual of the series, featuring Maru (left) and Kiruko (right)

天国大魔境 (Tengoku Daimakyō)
- Genre: Adventure; Mystery; Science fiction
- Anime television series
- Directed by: Hirotaka Mori
- Written by: Makoto Fukami
- Music by: Kensuke Ushio
- Studio: Production I.G
- Licensed by: Disney Platform Distribution
- Original network: Tokyo MX, HTB, RKB, TV Aichi, MBS, BS11, AT-X
- Original run: April 1, 2023 – June 24, 2023
- Episodes: 13
- icon

Heavenly Delusion (Japanese: 天国大魔境, Hepburn: Tengoku Daimakyō; lit. 'Heaven Grand Makyō') is a Japanese anime television series based on Masakazu Ishiguro's manga series Heavenly Delusion. The series was produced by Production I.G and directed by Hirotaka Mori. It was broadcast for 13 episodes on Tokyo MX and other networks from April to June 2023. The story is divided in two storylines with one involving the characters Maru and Kiruko as they travel across a post-apocalyptic world, while another story focuses on a group of children who live in a school.

Mori and the production side had to think about the overall structure, so Ishiguro had to tell them the story to the end. Because of this, he asked the editorial department to appoint a separate editor, specifically for the anime. The series adapts the first six volumes of the manga. Mori and his colleagues worked to properly convey the setting seen in the manga, while balancing the screen time between Maru and Kiruko, and the students from Heaven.

The anime adaptation has been positively received for its animation, and its focus on relationships and gender issues. It has been regarded as one of the best anime of 2023.

== Plot ==
The story is divided in two storylines with one involving the characters Maru and Kiruko as they travel across a post-apocalyptic world, while another story focuses on a group of children who live in a school. In the outside world, 15 years have passed since an unprecedented disaster completely destroyed modern civilization. A group of children live in a facility isolated from the outside world. One day, one of them, a girl named Tokio, receives a message that says, "Do you want to go outside of the outside?" Mimihime, another girl who lives in the same facility, has a prediction and tells the upset Tokio that two people will come from the outside to save her, one of whom has the same face as her, while the director of the school tells her that the outside world is Hell. Meanwhile, a boy named Maru, who looks just like Tokio, is traveling through this devastated Japan with a girl named Kiruko, in search of Heaven.

== Production ==
For the anime adaptation by Production I.G, director of photography Kentarou Waki appointed Hirotaka Mori as director based on their close relationship. Mori was worried he would not perform well in the role but was helped by directors Yuji Kaneko and Waki. Mori had known the animation producer Masashi Ohira since he started directing; Ohira motivated Mori to work on the project. Because expectations had been raised, Mori felt he had to make a proper product and meet the expectations. He was particularly attracted by the premise of the dual storylines and how the manga would change.

Writer Makoto Fukami had read And Yet the Town Moves which made him interested in Heavenly Delusion. The offer to make the anime happened before the fourth volume was released so the staff did not know how to end it. The narrative of the first chapters were trimmed to tell a more-direct story. Fukami avoided trimming the constant banter between Kiruko and Maru, which they noted was important for the plot setting. Mori said because the episodes were 20 minutes long, they had to decide how much screentime to give each side of the narrative to properly show the characters' stories.

For Mori, action scenes were the most challenging parts. The most prominent were the man-eaters, which were animated to give the idea of horror. Maru's action sequences were animated by Tetsuya Takeuchi, who wishes to match wuxia-like choreography with active camerawork. Maru was also assisted by Ryo Araki. Mori said it would look better with sound and movement, and that is why he thinks there is a significance to doing it in animation, which led to more effort on it. Because manga is drawn black and white, Mori was conscious of adding color to the world, such as the ruined landscape and the school, to make it look more attractive. Mori thought Maru is very pure and knows nothing yet. Mori finds Maru attractive for how he does not strangely rubbed his perception of the world different the more he travels around it. The director thought Maru meets Kiruko from a place where he does not know his own past, and gradually gains an ego. Kiruko is in a complex relationship with Maru, and has a past that is too heavy for her to handle alone. As a result, Mori enjoys the two characters and thinks they have a complementary relationship. Tokio is seen as a pure, adolescent-like character. She has a different kind of purity than Maru, and he thought Maru has maintained his innocence despite having experienced a lot of hardships because he has not have a clear view of the world until meeting Kiruko. Tokio has never being exposed to external pressure. Mori thinks Maru embodies common topics explored in adolescence.

According to Mori, the original work already contains the message Ishiguro wanted to convey so the production side does not add anything else but has many elements, such as disasters and technology. Mori thinks his responsibility is making anime properly convey the original work with as much integrity as possible. Mori is glad if the audience can see the series from various perspectives. Production of the first episode was the most difficult; it is an introduction, so the animators wanted the audience to like the world view and characters, and look forward to future episodes. The series was intended to have twelve episodes but an extra episode was added to provide proper closure.

Gen Satō, Maru's Japanese voice actor, found while Maru expresses several emotions, little about him is known so voicing the character became difficult for him. Hibiku Yamamura, Tokio's Japanese voice actress, regards Tokio as a delicate, difficult-to-approach character. Regarding the anime adaptation, the director and production team had to think about the overall structure so Ishiguro had to tell them the manga's full story. He asked the editorial department to appoint an editor specifically for the anime. The series is an adaptation of the first six volumes of the manga. Both Satō and Sayaka Senbongi initially had problems understanding their characters Maru and Kiruko, respectively, because there was little information about their pasts in the first episodes. Satō said Maru was one of his most-challenging roles. Ishiguro contacted the voice actors and told them they made their characters properly interact in the way he had envisioned.

== Release ==
The series, produced by Production I.G, was announced on October 18, 2022. It was directed by Hirotaka Mori, with scripts written by Makoto Fukami, character designs handled by Utsushita of Minakata Laboratory, and music composed by Kensuke Ushio. The series aired from April 1 to June 24, 2023, on Tokyo MX and other networks. The opening theme is "Innocent Arrogance", performed by Bish, while the ending theme is "Daremo Karemo Dokomo Nanimo Shiranai" (誰も彼も何処も何も知らない; "I Don't Know Anyone Anywhere Anything"), performed by Asobi. Avex Pictures released the series on two Blu-ray box sets on August 30 and September 27, 2023.

Disney Platform Distribution acquired the distribution license of the anime and streamed the series worldwide on Disney+ and in the United States on Hulu. The series was released in English under its Japanese title, Tengoku Daimakyo.

== Episodes ==
| No. | Title (Note: All English titles are taken from Disney platforms.) | Directed by | Written by | Storyboarded by | Original release date |
|---|---|---|---|---|---|
| 1 | "Heaven and Hell"; Transliteration: "Tengoku to Jigoku" (Japanese: 天国と地獄) | Hirotaka Mori | Makoto Fukami | Hirotaka Mori; Tetsuya Takeuchi (Note: Battle Scene Storyboard (バトルシーンコンテ)) | April 1, 2023 |
Following a disaster which has left Japan devastated, within a walled area, children are schooled by robots in a place they call "Heaven" and believe that the outside world is "Hell" and populated by monsters. One day, a student named Tokio receives a message that poses the question, "Do you want to go outside of the outside?" Meanwhile, outside the walls of the school, a girl named Kiruko, accompanied by a boy named Maru who looks like Tokio, is traveling through the devastated land in search of two men in a photograph and a place called "Heaven". They eventually encounter a self-sufficient woman living alone on a small farm who gives them food and shelter. However, while the youngsters fall asleep, she prepares for an apparent attack during the night.
| 2 | "Two Confessions"; Transliteration: "Futari no Kokuhaku" (Japanese: 二人の告白) | Kai Shibata | Makoto Fukami | Itsuki Tsuchigami | April 8, 2023 |
Life proceeds as usual within Heaven. Meanwhile, Kiruko and Maru are woken by the sound of a monster. When they go outside, the pair are attacked by a bird-like Hiruko. Maru deduces its offensive abilities so Kiruko can shoot it with her powerful "Kiru-Beam" gun. However, the woman stops her, claiming the Hiruko is her son. After a brief pause, she is suddenly killed. Once Maru kills the Hiruko, the pair depart and Maru shows Kiruko a syringe and drug which he is supposed to inject into someone who looks like him in Tomato Heaven. This prompts Kiruko to recall that as Mikura was dying, she gave her the gun and told her to take Maru to Heaven. The pair reach a farming village led by Kusakabe, where someone thinks Kiruko is the electro-kart racer Kiriko Takehaya. While on the farm, Maru sees boxes with the same logo featured on the handle of Kiruko's gun and decides to head back to Tokyo. Later, while on board a ferry, when Maru makes a pass at Kiruko, she confesses that while she has a woman's body, her mind is that of a man.
| 3 | "Kiriko and Haruki"; Transliteration: "Kiriko to Haruki" (Japanese: 桐子と春希) | Kazuya Nomura | Asako Kuboyama | Kazuya Nomura | April 15, 2023 |
Kiruko tells Maru how five years ago, siblings Haruki and Kiriko Takehaya lived in an orphanage. The older sister, Kiriko, was a successful electro-kart racer while her younger brother Haruki hung out with the much older Robin, who was the leader of a group fighting man-eaters. One day during a race, Haruki saw a man-eater on the course and tried to kill it himself. However, he failed and the man-eater began to consume him. When Kiriko saw this, she crashed her kart into it. She then pulled what was left of Haruki's torso from its maw before a gunshot was heard. Haruki later woke up in a hospital, but realized that he had Kiriko's body after the doctor operated on them. Months later, Kiruko tried to find out what happened, but the orphanage and everyone she knew was gone. Four years later, she met Maru in Nakano. Maru still has trouble accepting this information when suddenly the ferry is attacked by a fish monster with arm-like appendages. Meanwhile in Heaven, Kuku criticizes Kona's drawing of a baby, saying they do not have faces as she has seen one herself.
| 4 | "Kuku" (Japanese: クク) | Takashi Ōtsuka | Makoto Fukami | Takashi Ōtsuka; Asuka Suzuki | April 22, 2023 |
In Heaven, Kuku takes Tokio into an incubator room filled with babies. However, they have no features, only concentric circles on their faces and strange appendages instead of legs. When Tokio approaches a baby, an alarm goes off but they manage to escape detection. The adults run the facility with the aid of Mina, the AI which controls its functions, and they monitor the activities of the children, including their amorous feelings towards each other. Later, Tokio visits her friend Tarao, who is dying from an ailment, and he tells her to escape as the facility is dangerous. Meanwhile, onboard the ferry in Hell, Kiruko deduces that the fish beast uses a coating of water to survive and lures it into the vessel where it dries out and dies after cardboard boxes degrade its protective wet coating. When they reach port, one of the crew tells Kiruko that the bird logo belongs to Mitsuba and one lies along the road to the town. They find the "Mitsuba Home Center" abandoned building with the logo on it, but realize that the logo looks quite different.
| 5 | "Day of Fate"; Transliteration: "Omukae no Hi" (Japanese: お迎えの日) | Kōji Komurakata | Ikumi Nomura | Yōjirō Arai | April 29, 2023 |
Maru gets into a fight with a group of thugs and ably defends himself. He tells Kiruko that he was born in the same year as the Great Disaster and grew up in an orphanage, but the children were dispersed when he was aged seven. He survived in gangs until he was about ten when Mikura took him in. Later, after Kiruko sells some books to buy a map, Maru explains the War Collapse Theory to Kiruko. A passenger from the ferry approaches Maru and Kiruko seeking protection for himself and his "cargo" until he reaches the doctor at the Immortal Order, who can apparently grant humans eternal life by transplanting parts of a man-eater into them. However, the flesh has degraded, so Maru and Kiruko decide to head for a zone shown on their map which indicates clean water. Meanwhile in Heaven, Tarao dies from his disease and the Director is frustrated that there is no cure, insisting that one must be found before the upcoming Day of Fate. However, following the cremation of Tarao's body, the medical team find what looks like a large bug in the ashes.
| 6 | "100% Safe Water"; Transliteration: "Hyaku Pāsento Anzen Sui" (Japanese: 100%安全水) | Atsuto Masuda, Shūji Saitō, Shōta Hamada | Asako Kuboyama | Ryōta Furukawa, Atsuto Masuda, Haruo Okuno | May 6, 2023 |
Maru and Kiruko ask a local girl named Totori for directions to find clean water and leave their belongings with her. They enter an underground tunnel and are attacked by a monster. After Kiruko stops it, they discover the monster is actually a wild bear. While trapped up a concrete pylon, Maru and Kiruko realize that they need each other to survive. Kiruko eventually kills the bear with a shot from her Kiru-Beam gun. Later that evening, Kiruko tells Maru that she suspects that the people they have met are trying to exploit them. Totori attempts to have sex with Maru in another room, but when he touches her breast, he detects the heart of a Hiruko before he has to explain the embarrassing situation to Kiruko. Meanwhile in Heaven, Tokio is advised to rest in the infirmary where she dreams that Asura appears before her and that her body becomes covered in a red blotch. That night, she enters Kona's room where they declare their love for each other. Elsewhere, Dr. Sawatari finds evidence from a boot mark that Tokio entered the incubator room.
| 7 | "The Immortal Order"; Transliteration: "Fumetsu Kyōdan" (Japanese: 不滅教団) | Masamitsu Abe | Ikumi Nomura | Haruo Okuno | May 13, 2023 |
Hoping to make contact with the Immortal Order, Kiruko creates a sign offering to kill man-eaters and a doctor orders that they be brought before him. However, they are approached by a group calling themselves the Liviuman, who are led by Mizuhashi. They oppose the inhuman experiments by the Immortal Order which blur the boundary between what is human and machine. Maru and Kiruko accept the contract to kill the man-eater rumored to be kept in the Immortal Order building. They enter the basement while members of Liviuman hold a demonstration outside. However, Maru suspects that they are being set up again. They find a number of small dormant Hiruko which Maru easily kills, but then Kiruko is hypnotized by a large one. She has visions of being overwhelmed and devoured until Maru brings her to her senses by kissing her. They are then met by a man wearing an eye patch who says he is Dr. Usami and he asks for their help.
| 8 | "Their Choices"; Transliteration: "Sorezore no Sentaku" (Japanese: それぞれの選択) | Ryō Nakano | Asako Kuboyama | Haruka Fujita | May 20, 2023 |
The Liviuman members hold a demonstration outside the Immortal Order building. However, they withdraw once Mizuhashi falls on her head. As she lies unconscious, the new leader claims she has died and calls for revenge. Inside the building, Dr. Usami takes Maru and Kiruko to see a young woman with amputated limbs being kept alive by machines named Hoshio. He explains that she has a progressive disease which will turn her into a man-eater when she dies, and he asks Maru to kill her before that can happen. Hoshio requests to see the sky, so they move her and the apparatus to the balcony where Maru uses his power to take her life. Before she died, Hoshio left a final message for Usami, which causes him to break down. As the Liviuman enter the building, Usami's group heads off to find other quarters, but one recognizes Kiruko's photo of Robin as Dr. Inazaki from two years ago. As the group leaves, Usami tenderly holds Hoshio's body before he commits suicide.
| 9 | "Children of the Nursery"; Transliteration: "Gakuen no Kodomo-tachi" (Japanese: 学園の子供たち) | Kazuya Nomura | Makoto Fukami | Kazuya Nomura | May 27, 2023 |
Some years ago in Heaven, the being named Asura, who had the ability to heal and levitate, appeared before Kona to say goodbye before unexpectedly hanging itself. Meanwhile in Hell, Kiruko finds that Usami held a button with the bird logo when he died. Following a small earthquake, Maru and Kiruko encounter Juichi, who offers to sell them information. He tells them the three theories concerning the origins of the Great Disaster: a meteor, an alien invasion, and war. He then talks about living inside a "Walled Town" where he was used as a worker and "breeding pig" for the governing women before he escaped. After Kiruko dismisses his tales, she discovers that they are outside a Takahara Academy, which used the bird logo. When Maru and Kiruko investigate the abandoned building, Kiruko finds a document describing how it functioned as a type of school for orphans. Back in Heaven, the Director shockingly reveals Tokio is pregnant.
| 10 | "The Walled Town"; Transliteration: "Kabe no Machi" (Japanese: 壁の町) | Kai Ikarashi | Asako Kuboyama | Kai Ikarashi | June 3, 2023 |
Maru and Kiruko accompany Juichi on a five-hour road trip to the Walled Town to see if his baby is still alive. When they arrive there, they find the facility is seemingly abandoned. However, it is inhabited by a spider-shaped man-eater which can create a freezing cold environment. Once Kiruko manages to neutralize it, she, Maru and Juichi are approached by two former breeding pigs who inform Juichi his child is still alive. After Juichi has an emotional reunion with his son, Jugo, Kiruko plans to travel to the Takahara Academy facility in Ibaraki. That night, when they are once again attacked by the man-eater, Maru realizes it is actually Jugo, who is unaware of his abilities. Juichi decides to stay with the other men and Jugo, so he gives Maru and Kiruko his van. Juichi later brutally kills the man who raised the alarm when he escaped from the Walled Town. Meanwhile in Heaven, more children arrive at the facility.
| 11 | "The Test Begins"; Transliteration: "Tesuto o Hajimemasu" (Japanese: テストを始めます) | Yūjirō Moriyama | Ikumi Nomura | Yūjirō Moriyama | June 10, 2023 |
In Heaven, Tokio gives birth and the Director discusses with Sawatari the possibility that the child of the two "children" may be able to resist the incurable disease which eventually effects all the children produced by Mina. As the Director is in her 80s, she plans to have her brain transplanted into the much younger Deputy Director, Aoshima, to see her plans through to fruition. Meanwhile in Hell, Maru and Kiruko continue their journey in Juichi's van. At night, they see smoke in the distance and decide to investigate the next day. Back in Heaven, Mimihime befriends a lonely young girl named Ohma. However, when she removes Ohma's sunglasses, Mimihime experiences a terrible nightmare. The children are later gathered together and informed that they will all be undertaking a test which will require them to "reach the outside of the outside" in their role as Hiruko.
| 12 | "Outside of the Outside"; Transliteration: "Soto no Soto" (Japanese: 外の外) | Jun Shinohara | Makoto Fukami | Toshimasa Ishii | June 17, 2023 |
On the day of the test in Heaven, an explosion shatters their peaceful existence. The outer wall is breached and the children discover the world outside while inside the nursery, Sawatari become confused about which baby belongs to Tokio. Meanwhile in Hell, Maru and Kiruko come across a bustling marketplace, but discover that "chips" are used for currency. They go the Ministry of Reconstruction, to register and obtain some, where Kiruko discovers that Robin is there. She is given an appointment to meet him later at the Large Filtration Plant, which is on the site of the former Takahara Academy Ibaraki facility. At the appointed time, Kiruko goes there alone and explains to Robin that she is really Haruki in Kiriko's body, which causes Robin to suspect Sakota did the operation. However, after encouraging Kiruko to take a bath, Robin handcuffs, rapes, and forces her to have an identity crisis.
| 13 | "The Journey Continues and Begins"; Transliteration: "Tabi no Tsuzuki Tabi no Hajimari" (Japanese: 旅の続き・旅の始まり) | Kai Shibata, Kōji Komurakata, Tetsuya Takeuchi, Hirotaka Mori | Hirotaka Mori | Tomohiko Itō | June 24, 2023 |
Taka and Anzu continue exploring the outside world, while Mimihime and Shiro elect to return to Heaven and tell the others what they found. In Heaven, Sawatari gives a baby to Aoshima saying that it is Tokio's. Aoshima then announces the Noah Project to save the children. When Sawatari meets up with Tokio, a badly injured Director arrives and tries to take the baby away, which causes Tokio to activate her power. Meanwhile in Hell, Maru finally decides to search for Kiruko after two days. When the guards mention Robin and his ex-girlfriend's activities, Maru fights his way into the filtration plant to find Kiruko tied up and naked. Maru confronts and attacks Robin, but Kiruko stops him from killing Robin and they leave together. Kiruko is confused and depressed following her ordeal, but Maru again confesses his feelings and promises to protect her. A consoled Kiruko tears up the photo of Robin before they drive off to continue the search for Heaven. Elsewhere, Mimihime, Shiro, Taka and Anzu are seen on a speedboat headed towards a brightly lit city.

== Home media release ==
Avex Pictures (Region A, Blu-ray, Japan)
| Volume | Discs | Episodes | Release date | Ref. |
|---|---|---|---|---|
| I | 2 | 1–7 | August 30, 2023 | |
| II | 2 | 8–13 | September 27, 2023 | |

== Reception ==
=== Critical response ===
When it came to the adaptation, Anime News Network gave the first episode of the Heavenly Delusion anime a positive response due to its dystopian premise and the amount of characters, and compared in to Blame!, and the animation of the human and monster designs. They noted the series appears to heavily focus on gender, not on Kiruko's themes that come across as negative as the reviewer still found the character interesting based on how they are written. The reviewer praised the relationship between Maru and Kiruko for the way they care for each other, and noted the flashback's incestuous "angle might just be sensationalism for the sake of it, but I don't mind that extra splash of taboo when the full picture is this interesting".

Toni Sun Prickett of Anime Feminist enjoyed the handling of the animation and the dynamic between the two leads, and said Maru looks suspiciously similar to another character in the parallel story. Prickett also mentioned the amount of gender-based violence that occurs when Maru and Kiruko are attacked. With the eventual revelation Kiruko is a young man who had his brain transplanted into his sister's body, the website was optimistic about the handling of the main duo; for Maru still appearing likable when confessing his feelings to Kiruko and not sounding homophobic in response to the twist. Prickett was troubled by the repercussions of this twist on Kiruko's feelings because her early scenes in the first episode now made her look incestuous. Alice Gallo of Comic Book Resources also noted the series gender norms due to the complexity of Maru's and Kiruko's relationship because Maru seems to retain his affection for Kiruko despite knowing he is male. Gallo also compared Kiruko with a transgender character who is trying to accept the idea of having a female body.

Before the series' release, Polygon stated despite the absence of talented creators in the production staff, aside the studio and the composer Kensuke Ushio, the series looks intriguing and the animation is impressive. Clarín and Meristation compared the anime to the video game The Last of Us for its post-apocalypse setting with the main duo exploring areas like The Last of Us's protagonists Ellie and Joel. NME enjoyed the mystery and lack of exposition dumps, positively comparing the premise to those of The Leftovers and Station Eleven. IGN praised both the animation and the dynamic of the leads as the best pars of the anime. The Philippine Star praised the series for focusing on gender dysphoria through the relationship between Maru and Kiruko without queerbaiting audiences in a manner similar to "switcheroos" like Ranma ½ and Sailor Moon.

The voice actor for Kiruko, Sayaka Senbongi, was excited to voice the character because she knew of the manga and liked Kiruko before being cast in the role. Ishiguro praised Senbongi's work in the fifth episode when delivering Kiruko's mental breakdown, having edited he script to add new lines to the anime. According to Ishiguro, Production I.G made Kiruko more sexually appealing than his own rendering. The scene in which Totori tries to seduce Maru also received Ishiguro's attention because he found it more erotic than the equivalent scene in the manga. Furthermore, Ishiguro claimed that he cried when watching episode 8, much to his surprise as he originally wrote it himself. Ishiguro said Robin was "born in the story out of sheer necessity", and was surprised he became the most-hated character in the series.

=== Accolades ===
Heavenly Delusion won the overall "Spring 2023 Anime Awards" in the Anime Trending Spring 2023 awards. With this award, the series secured an Anime of the Year nomination. Ishiguro was pleased with this award, considering himself a fan of the Production I.G adaptation of the manga. It also won the Spring 2023 Genre awards for "Favorite Supernatural" and "Favorite Mystery or Psychological". At the 10th Anime Trending Awards, Heavenly Delusion won Anime of the Year, Best in Episode Directing and Storyboard, Best in Sceneries and Visuals, Mystery or Psychological Anime of the Year, and Supernatural Anime of the Year. At the 8th Crunchyroll Anime Awards in 2024, the series was nominated for Best Director (Hirotaka Mori), Best Drama, Best New Series, Best Cinematography (Kentaro Waki), and Best Opening Sequence ("Innocent Arrogance" by Bish).

=== Awards and nominations ===
| Year | Award | Category | Recipient | Result | Ref. |
|---|---|---|---|---|---|
| 2023 | 13th Newtype Anime Awards | Best Work (TV) | Heavenly Delusion | 10th place | |
| 2023 | 13th Newtype Anime Awards | Best Director | Hirotaka Mori | 6th place | |
| 2023 | 13th Newtype Anime Awards | Best Screenplay | Makoto Fukami | 2nd place | |
| 2023 | 13th Newtype Anime Awards | Best Studio | Production I.G | Won | |
| 2024 | 8th Crunchyroll Anime Awards | Best Director | Hirotaka Mori | Nominated | |
| 2024 | 8th Crunchyroll Anime Awards | Best Drama | Heavenly Delusion | Nominated | |
| 2024 | 8th Crunchyroll Anime Awards | Best New Series | Heavenly Delusion | Nominated | |
| 2024 | 8th Crunchyroll Anime Awards | Best Cinematography | Kentaro Waki | Nominated | |
| 2024 | 8th Crunchyroll Anime Awards | Best Opening Sequence | "Innocent Arrogance" by Bish | Nominated | |
| 2024 | 10th Anime Trending Awards | Anime of the Year | Heavenly Delusion | Won | |
| 2024 | 10th Anime Trending Awards | Best in Adapted Screenplay | Makoto Fukami | Nominated | |
| 2024 | 10th Anime Trending Awards | Best in Animation | Heavenly Delusion | Nominated | |
| 2024 | 10th Anime Trending Awards | Best in Episode Directing and Storyboard | Episode 8: "Their Choices" | Won | |
| 2024 | 10th Anime Trending Awards | Best in Sceneries and Visuals | Heavenly Delusion | Won | |
| 2024 | 10th Anime Trending Awards | Opening Theme Song of the Year | "Innocent Arrogance" by Bish | Nominated | |
| 2024 | 10th Anime Trending Awards | Action or Adventure Anime of the Year | Heavenly Delusion | Nominated | |
| 2024 | 10th Anime Trending Awards | Mystery or Psychological Anime of the Year | Heavenly Delusion | Won | |
| 2024 | 10th Anime Trending Awards | Sci-Fi or Mecha Anime of the Year | Heavenly Delusion | Nominated | |
| 2024 | 10th Anime Trending Awards | Supernatural Anime of the Year | Heavenly Delusion | Won | |
| 2024 | Japan Expo Awards | Daruma for Best Anime | Heavenly Delusion | Nominated | |
| 2024 | Japan Expo Awards | Daruma for Best Action Anime | Heavenly Delusion | Nominated | |
| 2024 | Japan Expo Awards | Daruma for Best Suspense Anime | Heavenly Delusion | Nominated | |
| 2024 | Japan Expo Awards | Daruma for Best Original Soundtrack | Heavenly Delusion | Nominated | |
| 2024 | Japan Expo Awards | Daruma for Best Opening | "Innocent Arrogance" by Bish | Nominated | |
