= Ikemen Villains =

Ikemen Villains: Wrapped in Wicked Romance
- Developer: CYBIRD
- Artist: Natsume Lemon
- Series: Ikemen series
- Platforms: iOS; Android
- Release: JP: March 28, 2023; WW: March 28, 2024

Ikemen Villains: Wrapped in Wicked Romance (イケメンヴィラン 闇夜にひらく悪の恋, Ikemen'vu~iran yamiyo ni hiraku aku no koi) is a Japanese otome visual novel developed by CYBIRD. It was released on March 28, 2023.

The game is part of CYBIRD's Ikemen series.

== Characters ==
Kate (ケイト, Keito)
Name changeable.
The protagonist (player). Worked as a postal worker in London, but after accidentally discovering their secret during a delivery, was forced into a new life as a Storyteller (おとぎ師, Otogishi).

William Rex (ウィリアム・レックス, Wiriamu Rekkusu)
Voiced by Shinnosuke Tachibana

Harrison Gray (ハリソン・グレイ, Harison Gurei)
Voiced by Noriaki Sugiyama

Liam Evans (リアム・エヴァンス, Riamu Evansu)
Voiced by Kotaro Nishiyama

Elbert Greetia (エルバート・グリーティア, Erubāto Gurītia)
Voiced by Takeo Otsuka

Alphonse Sylvetica (アルフォンス・シルベチカ, Arufonsu Shirubechika)
Voiced by Soma Saito

Roger Barrel (ロジャー・バレル, Rojā Bareru)
Voiced by Takuya Eguchi

Jude Jaza (ジュード・ジャザ, Jūdo Jaza)
Voiced by Kaito Takeda

Ellis Twilight (エリス・トワイライト, Erisu Towairaito)
Voiced by Gen Sato

Victor (ヴィクトル, Vikutoru)
Voiced by Hiroki Takahashi

Darius Vogel (ダリウス・フォーゲル, Dariusu Fōgeru)
Voiced by Chiharu Shigematsu

Nika Schwarz (ニカ・シュワルツ, Nika Shuwarutsu)
Voiced by Tetsuya Kakihara

Rin Schwarz (リン・シュワルツ, Rin Shuwarutsu)
Voiced by Kosuke Tanabe

== Development and release ==
Ikemen Villains was announced by CYBIRD as part of its 10-year anniversary. The game was released in Japan on March 28, 2023, with over 66,666 pre-registrations. The game's theme song is Shikkoku (漆黒; lit. 'Jet-Black') by Fujita Maiko.

In 2024, as part of the game's 1-year anniversary, CYBIRD released the game in English worldwide on March 28, 2024.

As part of the game's 3-year anniversary, Act 3 of the game, featuring a new origination Libra (ライブラ, Raibura), will be released in summer 2026.
