= Anjali Kunapaneni =

American voice actor

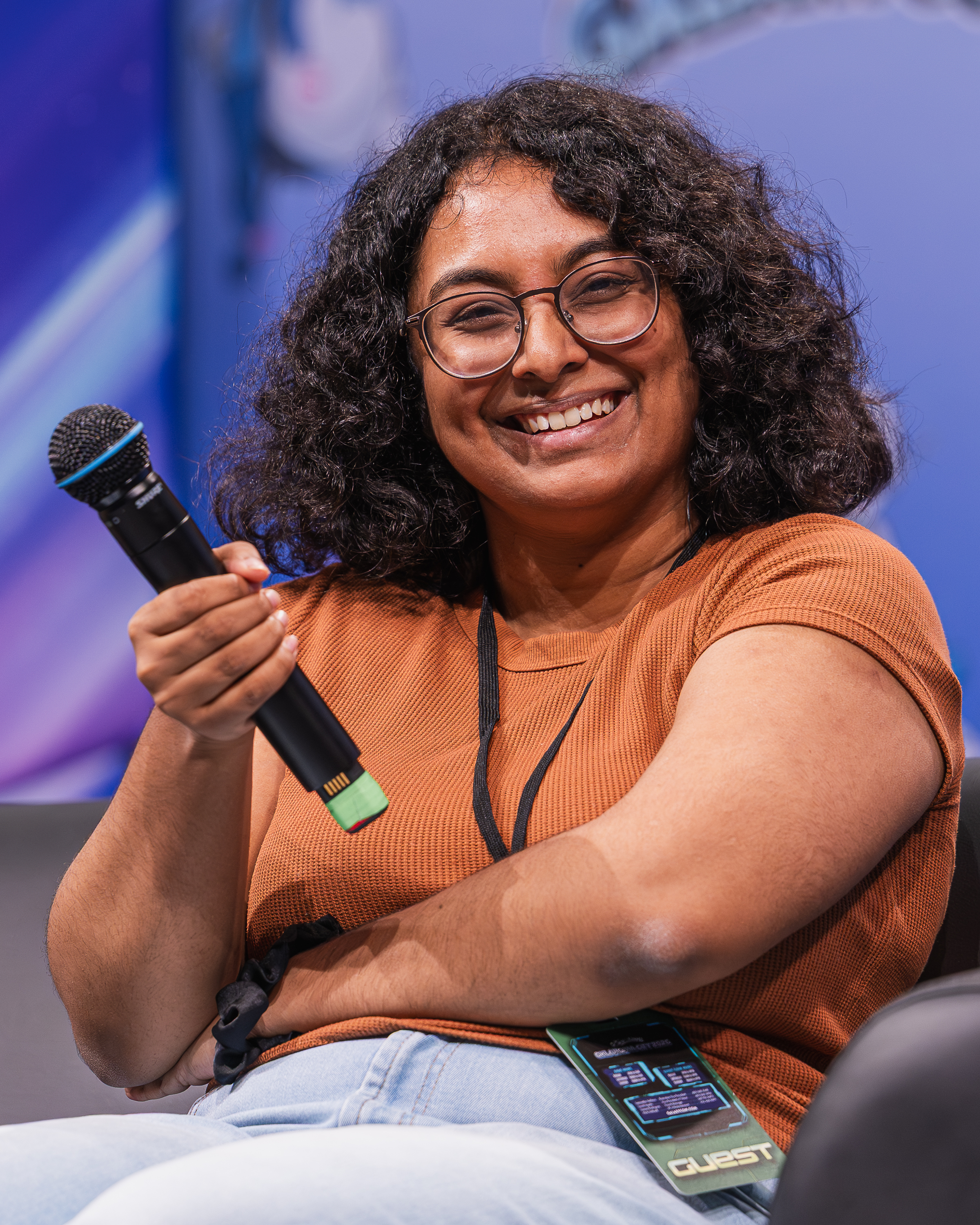
- Kunapaneni in 2026
- Occupation: Voice actor
- Years active: 2021–present
- Website: www.hearanjali.com

Anjali Kunapaneni is an American voice actor, known for their work on video games and English dubs of anime. They are known for their roles as Coco in Witch Hat Atelier, Ayaka Sajyou in Fate/Strange Fake, Yuri in the Gnosia anime, Roy in Pokémon Horizons: The Series and Kiruko in Heavenly Delusion.

== Biography ==
Originally intent on becoming a lawyer, Kunapaneni's college education was interrupted by the COVID-19 pandemic, which enabled them to explore other interests. After taking an acting class on a whim, Kunapaneni discovered their passion for acting.

In 2022, Kunapaneni was cast as Dori in Genshin Impact, after which they experienced harassment. At 6th Astra TV Awards in 2026, Kunapaneni was nominated in the Best Lead Voice-Over Performance category for their role as Coco in Witch Hat Atelier.

Kunapaneni is non-binary and uses they/them pronouns.

== Filmography ==
=== Animated series ===
List of voice performances in animated series
Year	Title	Role	Notes	Ref.
2021	Attack on Titan	Ramzi	Season 4	
2021	Record of Ragnarok	Parvati, Lilith		
2021	Fena: Pirate Princess	Karin		
2021	Kageki Shojo!!	Keito Mitsuki		
2021	How a Realist Hero Rebuilt the Kingdom	Kaede Foxia		
2021	The Heike Story	Sukemori		
2021	Demon Slayer: Kimetsu no Yaiba	Fuku		
2021	JoJo's Bizarre Adventure: Stone Ocean	Enrico Pucci (young)		
2021	Seirei Gensouki: Spirit Chronicles	Sara		
2022	Orient	Kojiro Kanemaki (young)		
2022	Tokyo 24th Ward	Kiriko Aoi		
2022	Ejen Ali	Mika	Season 3	
2023	The Legend of Heroes: Trails of Cold Steel – Northern War	Iseria Frost		
2023	Heavenly Delusion	Kiruko		
2023	Mashle: Magic and Muscles	Lemon	Season 1-2	
2023	Heaven Official's Blessing	Shi Qingxuan (Female)	Season 2	
2024	Pokémon Horizons: The Series	Roy	Seasons 26-present	
2024	Tower of God	Nya Nia	Season 2	
2024	Barbie Mysteries	Morgan		
2024	Invincible Fight Girl	Bertie, Kate, Toe #2		
2025	Your Friendly Neighborhood Spider-Man	Jeanne Foucault / Finesse		
2025	Mobile Suit Gundam GQuuuuuuX	Lalah Sune		
2025	Synduality: Noir	Theo		
2025	Kowloon Generic Romance	Lin Yaomay		
2025	Witch Watch	Keiko, Wolfina, Mr. Bread		
2025	Rascal Does Not Dream of Santa Claus	Miori Mito		
2025	Gnosia	Yuri		
2025	The Three Tomes	Sia Choudhury		
2025	Digimon Ghost Game	Sistermon Ciel		
2026	Fate/Strange Fake	Ayaka Sajyou		
2026	Jujutsu Kaisen	Yuki Tsukumo, Maki and Mai's Mother	Season 3	
2026	Witch Hat Atelier	Coco		
2026	Re:Zero	Shaula		

=== Films ===
List of voice performances in films
Year	Title	Role	Notes	Ref.
2022	Sing a Bit of Harmony	Ryoko		
2026	Cocoon	Mayu		

=== Video games ===
List of voice performances in video games
Year	Title	Role	Notes	Ref.
2017	Yu-Gi-Oh! Duel Links	Mimi Imimi / Number 6		
2017	Fire Emblem Heroes	Nidhoggr		
2022	Goddess of Victory: Nikke	Sakura		
2022	Genshin Impact	Dori		
2023	Arknights	Cardigan		
2023	Neptunia: Sisters VS Sisters	Ziri		
2023	Higan: Eruthyll	Fene, Icicle		
2023	Street Fighter 6	Chandi		
2023	Master Detective Archives: Rain Code	Shinigami		
2023	Rhapsody II: Ballad of the Little Princess	Gao, Nyan-Nyan Bakenekov	Also Rhapsody III: Memories of Marl Kingdom	
2024	Lunar: Silver Star Story Complete	Jessica de Alkirk, Lemia Ausa, Xenobia		
2024	Slave Zero X	Ayesha		
2024	Eiyuden Chronicle: Hundred Heroes	Lian		
2024	The Legend of Heroes: Trails through Daybreak	Feri Al-Fayed		
2024	Romancing SaGa 2: Revenge of the Seven	Orieve		
2025	Phantom Brave: The Lost Hero	Mayfair Jones		
2025	The Legend of Heroes: Trails Through Daybreak II	Feri Al-Fayed		
2025	Monster Hunter Wilds	Alma		
2025	Towa and the Guardians of the Sacred Tree	Kakan		
2025	Ys vs. Trails in the Sky	Cruxie		
2025	The Outer Worlds 2	Administrant Agarwal		
2026	The Legend of Heroes: Trails Beyond the Horizon	Feri Al-Fayed		
