= Heavenly Delusion =

Japanese manga series

- First tankōbon volume cover, featuring Kiruko (back) and Maru (front)

天国大魔境 (Tengoku Daimakyō)
- Genre: Adventure; Mystery; Science fiction
- Manga
- Written by: Masakazu Ishiguro
- Published by: Kodansha
- English publisher: NA: Denpa
- Imprint: Afternoon KC
- Magazine: Monthly Afternoon
- Original run: January 25, 2018 – present
- Volumes: 14
- Anime television series
- Heavenly Delusion (2023)
- icon

Heavenly Delusion (Japanese: 天国大魔境, Hepburn: Tengoku Daimakyō; lit. 'Heaven Grand Makyō') is a Japanese manga series written and illustrated by Masakazu Ishiguro. It has been serialized in Kodansha's seinen manga magazine Monthly Afternoon since January 2018 and its chapters have been collected in 14 tankōbon volumes as of October 2026.

The manga has two narratives; in one narrative, the characters Maru and Kiruko travel across a post-apocalyptic world to reach an area called "Heaven"; in the other, a group of children live in a school their superiors call "Heaven". The series was inspired by a manga Ishiguro read in university; he intended to make Heavenly Delusion different from his previous work, And Yet the Town Moves, portraying a proper dynamic between the two leads and the evil they face. Heavenly Delusion has themes of gender and natural disasters, which were inspired by Ishiguro's personal feelings.

An anime television series adaptation produced by Production I.G aired from April to June 2023.

By October 2026, the manga had over 2.5 million copies in circulation. The manga has been received positively, and was praised for its sense of mystery and the relationship between the characters from both scenarios presented at the same time. It has also won several accolades such as the Japan Expo Awards.

== Plot ==
Fifteen years after an unprecedented disaster destroyed modern civilization, a group of children live in a facility isolated from the outside world known as the Takahara Academy. One day, a girl named Tokio, receives a message that says: "Do you want to go outside of the outside?" Mimihime, another girl who lives in the same facility, has a premonition and tells the upset Tokio two people will come from the outside to save her, one of whom has the same face as her, while the school's director tells Tokio the outside world is Hell. A boy named Maru, who looks just like Tokio, is traveling through post-apocalyptic Japan with his bodyguard, a girl named Kiruko, in search of Heaven. Maru is looking for a person who has his face, and he and Kiruko often encounter thieves and kaiju-like creatures they call "Man-eaters". While Kiruko is a skilled fighter, having been trained by one of her caretakers, Robin Inazaki, she also mentors Maru who has an unknown power that allows him to instantly destroy the Man-eaters. The narrative often switches between Heaven and Hell, expanding upon each cast of characters.

Early in the series, Maru confesses his love for Kiruko, who claims they are actually a man whose brain was transferred to their sister's brother, Kiriko, after being fatally wounded by a Man-eater. A Takahara student named Kona remains traumatized about the suicide of his friend, Asura, but still starts a relationship with Tokio, resulting in the birth of the first biologically born baby in Takahara. A clone of the baby is made, but following an earthquake, Dr. Teruhiko "Sawatari" Sakota loses sight of the baby and cannot tell which is the original and which is the clone. At this point, it is revealed the Takahara Academy's timeline takes place several years in the past, as Maru and Kiruko investigate its fall. While investigating the city, Kiruko meets Robin, who sadistically violates her, and Maru brutally beats him after finding him. Though traumatized, Kiruko decides to protect Maru in their journey and abandon him once they reach Takahara, out of disgust with themselves. Maru's caretaker is also revealed to be Shino Kaminaka, the director from Takahara, who had her brain transplanted to the student Mikura by Sawatari, and is also the mastermind of the disaster that destroyed the world in an attempt to create a new world order through Takahara. Kiruko meets Sawatari, who recognizes her as the child who he transplanted the brain to the late sister, claiming somebody had killed her. Sawatari recognizes Maru as Tokio's child and, at the same time, as Yamato's brother, but is killed by a Man-eater.

Dr. Yuko "Imanaga" Aoshima learns of Sawatari's death and provides Maru and Kiruko with a vehicle and robot as an aid to find the location of Tokio and Yamato. As the duo keep traveling, Kiruko finds their caretaker, Toru Funayama, who explains that Robin killed Kiriko, as he claims he became a horrible person following his sister's death. As the manga also focuses on Mikura's and other Takahara students, most students start dying as a result of a disease believed to have started by an artificial intelligence known as Mina. Her true origins remain unknown, but she has orchestrated that the dying students would become the Man-eaters that Maru and Kiruko have been killing. Upon reaching a city, Maru and Kiruko meet Tokio and Yamato to give the shot to Tokio's. However, Yamato reveals it is meant to erase a copy of the child Tokio had. Despite having no proof who is the clone, Yamato injects himself, which causes Tokio to seal him, afraid it would kill him.

== Production ==
=== Development ===
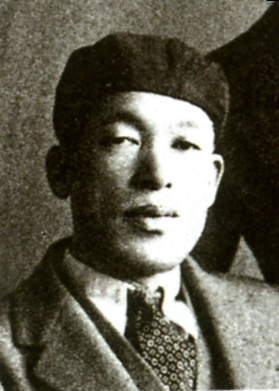
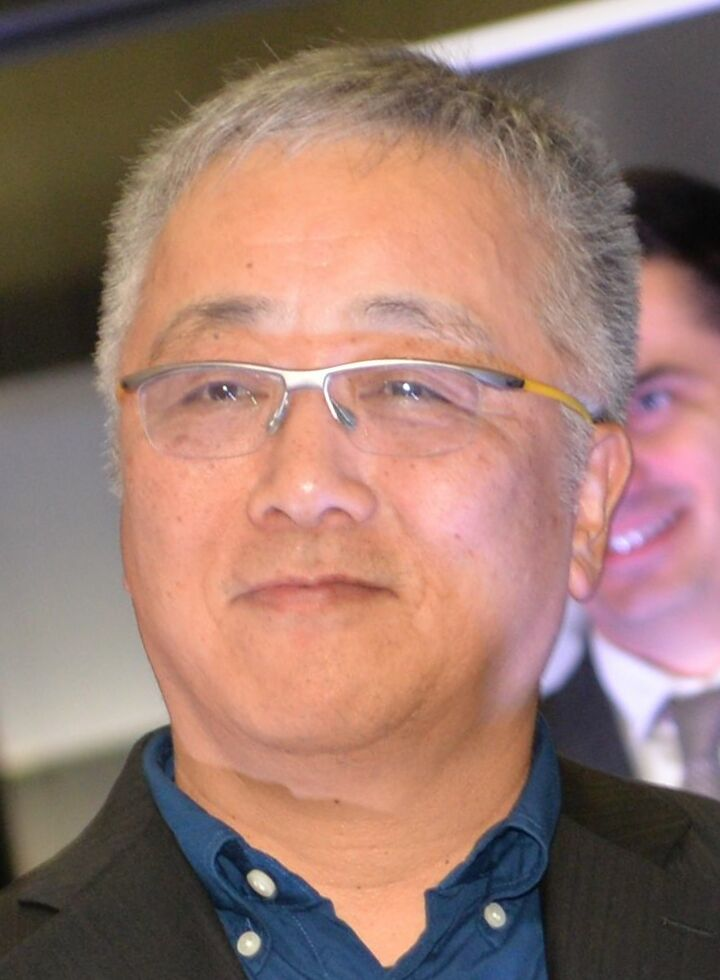
Yumeno Kyusaku (left) and Katsuhiro Otomo (right) influenced Ishiguro in the making of the series.

Following the conclusion of And Yet the Town Moves, Masakazu Ishiguro spent approximately a year developing a new series. His conceptual framework for Heavenly Delusion drew inspiration from the early Kojiki period of Japan and explored relationships between humans and artificial intelligence. The initial concept originated in 2013 as cover art for the magazine Monthly Comic Ryū. Ishiguro noted unintentional similarities to his favorite work, Akira, including the post-apocalyptic setting and the dynamic between the protagonists Maru and Kiruko. He consciously emulated Akira's detailed approach to backgrounds and character mannerisms, such as eating scenes. Deliberately seeking a darker tone than his previous work, Ishiguro aimed to depict "evil" convincingly, resulting in a significantly more grim post-apocalyptic world for Heavenly Delusion.

After Ishiguro drafted character designs for a shōnen demographic, editors from Monthly Afternoon requested he create a series for their seinen magazine. The resulting series employed a dark tone centered on children's delusions, a contrast to his earlier work, though Ishiguro still intended it for his existing readers. This theme was exemplified by the character Tokio, who resides in a mysterious facility and collects fantasy paintings created by her friend Kona, a character capable of imagining things he has never seen. Ishiguro related this ability to his own process of "drawing delusions". To preserve the series' mystery, the first volume established numerous plot threads with minimal direct foreshadowing of events.

Ishiguro first conceived the story's premise while a university student, based on a race on a circuit where the Earth is destroyed mid-event and the protagonist faces death. He created an ambiguous title by juxtaposing the words "Heaven" (天国) and "Great Demonic Lair" (大魔境). His artwork for the series became more detailed, particularly in rendering Kiruko's facial expressions. The design of the man-eaters, or kaiju-like creatures fought by Maru and Kiruko, was based on prehistoric organisms such as those from the Cambrian period, with their forms adapted to suit Ishiguro's drawing style. Ishiguro's longstanding interest in science fiction, influenced by the manga duo Fujiko Fujio, continued to inform the series' themes.

The manga's development spanned several years. Ishiguro's enjoyment of walking led him to fantasize about a world destroyed by catastrophe, finding inspiration in anime such as Armored Trooper Votoms, whose protagonist Chirico Cuvie wanders alone. This inspired the concept of a solitary hero traveling in combat armor, which influenced the leads' characterization. Initially planning a desert setting, Ishiguro changed to an urban environment after the Minami Kamakura Film Commission released a promotional video featuring a similar desert image with music by Kenshi Yonezu. Drawing backgrounds with numerous buildings proved challenging. The concept of the academy was modeled after Yumeno Kyusaku's novel Dogura Magura. The series was extended beyond its original planned length after Ishiguro judged the initial ending to be weak, and he frequently revised panels and scripts during production.

The sibling-like dynamic between Maru and Kiruko was based on Ishiguro's personal observation of someone showing interest in his sister, combined with inspiration from buddy films. Maru's character design was based on Kon from And Yet the Town Moves, inspired by how JoJo's Bizarre Adventure's eighth story arc, JoJolion, reused previous characters. A central narrative premise involves Maru developing feelings for Kiruko without knowing his bodyguard is a man inhabiting a girl's body. Ishiguro described this as "transsexual sci-fi", alluding to the potential for Maru's feelings to persist even after learning the truth.

=== Themes ===
The main cast of Heavenly Delusion includes the travelers Maru and Kiruko (foreground, from left to right) and the students from Heaven in the background. The themes of gender identity and oppression by their superiors are explored in the manga.

When Ishiguro started writing Heavenly Delusion, he felt discomfort about events in Japan. Around 2017 and 2018, Japan was looking for flaws in its governance in the run-up to the 2020 Summer Olympics. Ishiguro personally experienced a case of déjà vu because of the scandal with the empty New Year's food and wanted the handling of meals to be properly shown in his work. At that time, the country also experienced earthquakes and tsunamis. Sensing an ominous similarity between that time and the present, Ishiguro wanted to convey the sense of threat the society increasingly felt. The credo of the series is to be cautious, lest may encounter something truly terrible. The character of Totori was written to prove people who can easily be seen as villains are important to others; Totori is friendly with Maru and Kiruko to the point she attempts to seduce Maru who rejects her. In the aftermath, the duo learn that Totori belongs to a gang who had been chasing them in the past days and died, leaving her all alone. While reading the manga, Ishiguro wanted the reader to experience fear. One the manga's central themes is the most-minimal "heaven" for people is to "feel extremely comfortable in their own field of vision"; if a manga continues this search for "heaven" too much, the place will come across as a "hell". The concept of looking for heaven is the biggest moral of the series.

Ishiguro wanted to tell the story of a girl's body that contains the brain of her younger brother, but he does not remember when the idea came to him. He was inspired by stories of brothers and sisters, so he wanted to create his own story about a brother and a sister swapping places. He rejected coincidences related to magic and wanted to create a more-realistic world to show what might happen after a brain transplant. He opposed the idea of a man turning into a woman, leading to jokes about cleavage and lacking a penis. Instead, with Kiruko, he wanted the scenario to be more realistic. Another theme is a change in relationships in the event of a sex change. Ishiguro often writes metaphorical situations; Kiruko's menstrual cycle happens to end up resuming after having been awoken from a hallucination from a Hiruko's attack by Maru inducing temporary asphyxiation with mouth-to-mouth. Kiruko represents a gradation of spiritual sexuality. The school is depicted as a kind of thought experiment in a world where sexual elements are abolished.

In the book Critical Posthumanities, Maru and Kiruko are called posthuman characters based on the commentaries from Francesca Fernando; Maru possesses an outstanding physical shape that allows to fight older people all alone and easily recover from wounds that do not work on common people like regrowing a tooth he loses when being attacked. As the series progresses, it is revealed Maru is one of the first humans born with the nature to eliminate Hirukos just like him. The apparent lack morals Kiruko and Maru display in the series were noted for being allowed a woman to let a man-eater confused that might be her late son living as a man-eater. Maru's design includes a black jacket that contains "We are neither machines nor game pieces". This comes across as a visual resistance throughout the series against the non-consensual corruption of the children who suffer traumas while dealing with their supernatural abilities given by the doctors from Takahara Academy. Maru and Kiruko also show morals about the possible evolution of man-eaters in the first episodes of the anime but such scene ends with failure when one of them kills a woman claiming to be its mother. Kiruko is seen as a "human chimera" due to the nature of their life after the surgery. The writer calls Kiruko "a new person born out of the combination of two bodies and yet a separate existence from them".

== Media ==
=== Manga ===
Heavenly Delusion is written and illustrated by Masakazu Ishiguro, and it has been serialized in Kodansha's seinen manga magazine Monthly Afternoon since January 25, 2018. Kodansha has published its chapters in individual tankōbon volumes, the first of which was released on July 23, 2018; a promotional video that was directed by Tasuku Watanabe for the first volume was released on the same date. As of October 22, 2026, 14 volumes have been released.

In North America, the series is licensed in English by Denpa. The first volume was released on December 31, 2019.

=== Anime ===
A 13-episode anime television series adaptation by Production I.G was aired from April 1 to June 24, 2023, on Tokyo MX and other networks.

=== Other ===
An official guidebook for Heavenly Delusion was released on November 22, 2022. It includes detailed information about the series' setting, story, characters, and features an interview with Ishiguro.

== Reception ==
By December 2018, over 130,000 copies of the Heavenly Delusion manga were in circulation. By July 2025, the manga had over two million copies in circulation. By October 2026, the manga had over 2.5 million copies in circulation.

Reviewing the first volume of Heavenly Delusion, Anime News Network praised the narrative for its focus on Kiruko's and Maru's appealing relationship, and Ishiguro's character designs. The reviewer said while the volume explores the mysteries behind Kiruko, there were still too many mysteries the plot would explore in the future. The French website Manga News called the manga's premise captivating due to the mysteries it shows. Sigue en Serie also commented on the mysteries of the series, which would motivate readers to quickly move to the next volume to understand more of the plot through the parallel storylines. By the third volume, Manga News noted the events on the both storylines had been connected, especially from Tokio's point of view, while the duo's journey was noted to be more comic than tragic as a result of the way Ishiguro writes the chapters. The reviewer still felt both plots offer interesting mysteries whose connections are not easily given away. Brutus magazine listed Heavenly Delusion on its list of "Most Dangerous Manga", which includes works with the most-stimulating and thought-provoking themes.

Makoto Yukimura, author of the manga Vinland Saga, expressed interest in the themes of Heavenly Delusion due to the idea of a heaven, as well as the way Ishiguro tells two connected stories at the same time.

=== Accolades ===
Heavenly Delusion was ranked first on Takarajimasha's Kono Manga ga Sugoi! 2019 ranking of Top 20 manga series for male readers. Heavenly Delusion was one of the Jury Recommended Works at the 24th and 25th Japan Media Arts Festival in 2021 and 2022, respectively. The manga was awarded the French Daruma Award for the Best Screenplay category at the Japan Expo Awards in 2023.
