= I'm Enterprise =

Japanese talent agency

I'm Enterprise Co., Ltd.
- Native name: 株式会社アイムエンタープライズ
- Romanized name: Kabushikigaisha Aimuentāpuraizu
- Type: Private KK
- Industry: Voice acting
- Founder: June 22, 1993; 33 years ago
- Headquarters: Yoyogi, Shibuya, Tokyo, Japan
- Services: Talent management
- Website: https://www.imenterprise.jp/

I'm Enterprise Co., Ltd. (Japanese: 株式会社アイムエンタープライズ, Hepburn: Kabushikigaisha Aimuentāpuraizu) is a voice talent management firm in Japan.

== Members ==
=== Female ===
- Hikaru Akao
- Saori Hayami
- Hiromi Hirata
- Kaede Hondo
- Yuko Iida
- Konomi Inagaki
- Rie Kugimiya
- Rin Kusumi
- Mako
- Maria Naganawa
- Mai Nakahara
- Mayako Nigo
- Miho Okasaki
- Saori Ōnishi
- Ari Ozawa
- Chiwa Saitō
- Yū Sasahara
- Sayaka Senbongi
- Aya Suzaki
- Larissa Tago Takeda
- Mikako Takahashi
- Mutsumi Tamura
- Yuiko Tatsumi
- Hiromi Tsunakake
- Maaya Uchida
- Kana Ueda
- Sayuri Yahagi
- Mayumi Yoshida
- Haruka Yoshimura

=== Male ===
- Kōhei Amasaki
- Wataru Katoh
- Junji Majima
- Yoshitsugu Matsuoka
- Takuma Nagatsuka
- Takeo Ōtsuka
- Gen Satō
- Hiro Shimono
- Motoki Takagi
