= Sayaka Senbongi =

Japanese voice actress

- 千本木 彩花
- Born: November 24, 1995 (age 30); Saitama Prefecture, Japan
- Occupation: Voice actress
- Years active: 2013–present
- Agent: I'm Enterprise
- Spouse: Tasuku Hatanaka (m. 2019)

Sayaka Senbongi (千本木 彩花, Senbongi Sayaka; born November 24, 1995) is a Japanese voice actress.

== Biography ==
Senbongi studied acting at the Japan Narration Institute. Before graduating, she made her debut as Claire Kokonoe in Chronicles of the Going Home Club. In 2014, she joined I'm Enterprise. She voiced Mumei, the first main heroine in the anime series Kabaneri of the Iron Fortress. She played Chitose Karasuma in Girlish Number. She won the Best Rookie Actresses at the 11th Seiyu Awards. On September 1, 2019, she was selected as the Saturday personality for the program Hino Midnight Graffiti Run! Kayokyoku starting in October 2019. On December 29, 2019, her agency announced in a statement that she and fellow voice actor Tasuku Hatanaka had gotten married.

== Filmography ==
=== Anime series ===
List of performances in anime
Year	Title	Role
2013	Chronicles of the Going Home Club	Claire Kokonoe
2014	Inu Neko Hour: '47 Todoufuken R' and 'Nya~men - Are	high school girl; customer
2014	Sword Art Online II	schoolgirl (ep 23)
2015	Mobile Suit Gundam: Iron-Blooded Orphans	Cracker Griffon
2015	Unlimited Fafnir	Yū Mononobe (young); operator B
2015	Uta no☆Prince-sama♪ Maji Love Revolution	audience (ep 9)
2015	Wakaba Girl	voice 2 (ep 9)
2016	Girlish Number	Chitose Karasuma
2016	Haruchika	Nozomi Yamazaki
2016	Heavy Object	Beautiful investigator (ep 15)
2016	Kabaneri of the Iron Fortress	Mumei
2016	Magi: Adventure of Sinbad	Village girl A
2016	Magic★Kyun! Renaissance	Kohana Aigasaki
2016	Please Tell Me! Galko-chan	Tsunno
2016	Prince of Stride: Alternative	Girl (ep 12)
2016	Servamp	Marie
2016	Snow White with the Red Hair 2	Lady-in-waiting (ep 17)
2016	The Lost Village	Yūno
2016	Undefeated Bahamut Chronicle	Female student A
2017	Aho Girl	Ruri Akutsu
2017	Anime-Gataris	Arisu Kamiigusa
2017	Attack on Titan Season 2	Nifa
2017	Clockwork Planet	AnchoR
2017	Just Because!	Mayuko Satō
2017	Knight's & Magic	Stefania Serrati
2017	Onihei	Ojun
2017	Piace: Watashi no Italian	Morina Nanase
2018	Attack on Titan Season 3	Nifa
2018	Crossing Time	Ai
2018	Doreiku	Julia Katsushika
2018	JoJo's Bizarre Adventure: Golden Wind	Trish Una
2018	Overlord III	Cixous
2018	That Time I Got Reincarnated as a Slime	Shuna
2018	The Ryuo's Work Is Never Done!	Machi Kugui
2018	Bloom Into You	Chie Yuzuki (Note: Credited as "Senpai" (「先輩」))
2019	Ahiru no Sora	Madoka Yabuchi
2019	Beastars	Haru
2019	High School Prodigies Have It Easy Even In Another World	Jeanne du Leblanc
2019	Over Drive Girl 1/6	Belenore
2019	Pokémon Journeys: The Series	Kikuna, Gō's Messon
2019	The Demon Girl Next Door	Anri Sata
2019	Wasteful Days of High School Girls	Rie "USB" Mikami
2019	Outburst Dreamer Boys	Nanako Watase
2020	Magia Record: Puella Magi Madoka Magica Side Story	Kanagi Izumi (Episode 8, voice)
2020	Drifting Dragons	Nanami
2020	Peter Grill and the Philosopher's Time	Piglette Pancetta
2021	Beastars Season 2	Haru
2021	That Time I Got Reincarnated as a Slime Season 2	Shuna
2021	The Slime Diaries: That Time I Got Reincarnated as a Slime	Shuna
2021	Shinkansen Henkei Robo Shinkalion Z	Kasumi Abiko
2021	I've Been Killing Slimes for 300 Years and Maxed Out My Level	Falfa
2021	Kageki Shojo!!	Sarasa Watanabe
2022	The Genius Prince's Guide to Raising a Nation Out of Debt	Falanya Elk Arbalest
2022	The Demon Girl Next Door Season 2	Anri Sata
2022	Extreme Hearts	SaKo
2022	Peter Grill and the Philosopher's Time: Super Extra	Piglette Pancetta
2022	Arknights: Prelude To Dawn	Crownslayer (Lyudmila)
2022	Bocchi the Rock!	Kikuri Hiroi
2023	The Magical Revolution of the Reincarnated Princess and the Genius Young Lady	Anisphia Wynn Palettia
2023	Is It Wrong to Try to Pick Up Girls in a Dungeon? IV	Gojōno Kaguya
2023	Heavenly Delusion	Kiruko
2023	I Got a Cheat Skill in Another World and Became Unrivaled in the Real World, Too	Miu Midō
2023	Shangri-La Frontier	Animalia
2024	Chained Soldier	Koko Zenibako
2024	Delicious in Dungeon	Marcille Donato
2024	'Tis Time for "Torture," Princess	Gilga
2024	The Unwanted Undead Adventurer	Isabel
2024	Kaiju No. 8	Konomi Okonogi
2024	Dungeon People	Clay
2024	Trillion Game	Futaba
2024	Kinokoinu: Mushroom Pup	Tsubaki
2025	My Hero Academia: Vigilantes	Kuin Hachisuka
2025	Yaiba: Samurai Legend	Nadeshiko Yamato
2025	Alma-chan Wants to Be a Family!	Tokoyo Omoikane
2026	Hell Mode	Cecil
2026	Black Torch	Ichika Kishimojin
2026	Young Ladies Don't Play Fighting Games	Yu Inui
2026	Mebius Dust	Maria
2026	Romelia War Chronicle	Elizabeth

=== Film ===
- Attack on Titan: Roar of Awakening as Nifa
- Even if the World Will End Tomorrow (2019) as Kotoko
- Kabaneri of the Iron Fortress: Unato Decisive Battle (2019) as Mumei
- Fate/Grand Order: Camelot - Wandering; Agaterám (2020) as Hassan of Serenity
- Fate/Grand Order: Camelot - Paladin; Agaterám (2021) as Hassan of Serenity
- Eureka - Eureka Seven: Hi-Evolution (2021) as Red 2
- Bubble (2022) as Usagi
- That Time I Got Reincarnated as a Slime the Movie: Scarlet Bond (2022) as Shuna

=== ONA ===
- Shinken Zemi Kōkō Kōza's Short Anime "Turnover" (2015) as Ai
- Fool Night (2026) as Meg Okumura

=== Video games ===
2014

- Duel Blake School as Kugutsu Ayatsu, Suzuko Takamaha
- Granblue Fantasy as Gwynne
- Pirates of Fantasia as Veronica
- Venus Dungeon as Augustus; Choryo

2015

- Brave Sword X Blaze Soul
- Thousand Memories as Leonora; Wanda
- Twilight Lore as Ariel; Gera; Hawkeye

2016

- Fate/Grand Order as Hassan of Serenity
- Yome Collection as Mumei
- Ys VIII: Lacrimosa of Dana as Mia, Sia, Amy

2017

- Blue Reflection as Sanae Nishida
- Cyberdimension Neptunia: 4 Goddesses Online as Kiria
- Xenoblade Chronicles 2 as Vale (Mei in Japanese)
- Fire Emblem Heroes as Framme
- Nights of Azure 2: Bride of the New Moon as Aluche Anatoria
- School Girl/Zombie Hunter as Enami Kamijo
- SINoALICE as Shuna
- Song of Memories as Natsume Kurihara
- Tales of the Rays as Haze Cesario Ideafeldt
- Yuki Yuna is a Hero: Hanayui no Kirameki as Sekka Akihara

2018

- Attack on Titan 2 as Nifa
- Magia Record as Kanagi Izumi
- Dragalia Lost as Felicia
- Dragon Star Varnir as Minessa
- Crystar as Mirai Hatada
- Memories Off: Innocent Fille as Noel Kagamigawa

2019

- Chocobo's Mystery Dungeon: Every Buddy! as Shirma Magnolie
- Memories Off: Innocent Fille for Dearest as Noel Kagamigawa
- Pokemon Masters as Kotone

2020

- Octopath Traveler: Champions of the Continent as Shelby, Molrusso
- Punishing: Gray Raven as Teddy
- Touhou LostWord as Raiko Horikawa, Aya Shameimaru (Flower), Sagume Kishin (Truth Temple of Legitimacy and Integrity), Saki Kurokoma

2021

- Girls und Panzer: Senshadō Daisakusen! as Emi Nakasuga
- Guardian Tales as Lynn
- Rune Factory 5 as Livia

2022

- Xenoblade Chronicles 3 as Riku
- Azur Lane as FFNF Brest
- Chocobo GP as Shirma
- JoJo's Bizarre Adventure: All Star Battle R as Trish Una
- Goddess of Victory: Nikke as Eunhwa, Ether
- Granblue Fantasy as Gwynne
- Harvestella as Protagonist
- Heaven Burns Red as Bon Ivar Yamawaki
- Triangle Strategy as Anna Pascal

2023

- Blue Protocol as Charlotte
- Fire Emblem Engage as Framme
- Xenoblade Chronicles 3: Future Redeemed as Riku
- Sword Art Online: Last Recollection as Lipia
- Touhou Gensou Eclipse as Momiji Inubashiri

2024

- Eiyuden Chronicle: Hundred Heroes as Lian
- Final Fantasy VII Rebirth as Esther
- TOKYO PSYCHODEMIC as Tomona Akiba
- Unicorn Overlord as Dinah
- Zenless Zone Zero as Belle

2025

- Arknights as Crownslayer (Lyudmila)
- Double Dragon Revive as Marian Kelly
- Wuthering Waves as Buling

2026

- Blue Archive as Konoka Shima

=== Drama CDs ===
- Shidenkai no Maki (2015), Sachi
- Trinity Tempo (2015), Sae Kasuga

=== Dubbing ===
- All of Us Are Dead (Seo Hyo-ryung (Kim Bo-yoon))
- The Casagrandes Movie (Sid Chang (Leah Mei Gold))
- His Dark Materials (Lyra Belacqua (Dafne Keen))
- Hypnotic (Minnie (Hala Finley))
- Jentry Chau vs. the Underworld (Jentry Chau (Ali Wong))
- Marriage Contract (Cha Eun-seong (Shin Rin-ah))
- Shazam! (2021 THE CINEMA edition) (Young Thaddeus (Ethan Pugiotto))
- Strays (Riley (Mikayla Rousseau))
