= Phantom Brave: The Lost Hero =

2025 video game

- Developer: Nippon Ichi Software
- Publisher: Nippon Ichi Software
- Writer: Kento Jobana
- Platforms: Nintendo Switch; PlayStation 4; PlayStation 5; Windows
- Release: PS4, PS5, Switch; January 30, 2025; Windows; April 24, 2025
- Genre: Tactical role-playing
- Mode: Single-player

Phantom Brave: The Lost Hero (Note: Japanese: ファントム・ブレイブ 幽霊船団と消えた英雄) is a tactical role-playing game developed by Nippon Ichi Software. It is the sequel to 2004's Phantom Brave and released on January 30, 2025 for PlayStation 4, PlayStation 5, and Nintendo Switch, and on April 24, 2025 for Windows.

== Synopsis ==
Months after the events of Phantom Brave, Marona and Ash set sail across the seas, only to be attacked by ghost ships known as the Shipwreck Fleet. When they're attacked by a mysterious figure, Ash manages to get Marona out of there but is forced to stay behind.

After Marona washes ashore, she meets a ghost girl named Apricot who wishes to find her missing father and reunite their pirate crew who were broken up by the Shipwreck Fleet. The two agree to work together, sailing off to reform Apricot's father's pirate crew in order to find Ash and Apricot's father.

== Development and release ==
Phantom Brave: The Lost Hero was announced at Nintendo Direct presentation on June 16th, 2024 and confirmed for a simultaneous worldwide release date on January 30th, 2025 except for the Steam version which is planned to release in Spring 2025.

According to Yuya Hosono, the primary reason for creating a sequel to the original game was due to an American poll of the most popular Nippon Ichi Software characters; at the time the company had released several games in America but they thought the top spots would probably be held by the characters from the Disgaea series. However, the results showed the Phantom Brave characters ranked higher than the Disgaea characters. This made the development team realize that "even after twenty years, there is still a desire for Marona and her team". Nippon Ichi Software's American subsidiary, NIS America, also supported the decision to make a sequel.

== Reception ==
Reception

Aggregate scores
Aggregator	Score
Metacritic	NS: 74/100; PS5: 77/100
OpenCritic	75% recommend (Note: Based on 6 reviews)

Review scores
Publication	Score
Famitsu	8/10, 8/10, 8/10, 8/10
Shacknews	7/10

According to the review aggregation website Metacritic, the PlayStation 5 version of Phantom Brave: The Lost Hero received "generally favorable" reviews from critics, while the Nintendo Switch version received "mixed or average" reviews from critics. Fellow review aggregator OpenCritic assessed that the game received strong approval, being recommended by 75% of critics. In Japan, four critics from Famitsu gave the game a total score of 32 out of 40, with each critic awarding the game an 8 out of 10.
