= Gen Satō =

Japanese voice actor

- 佐藤 元
- Born: March 22, 1997 (age 29); Kanagawa Prefecture, Japan
- Occupation: Voice actor
- Years active: 2017–present
- Agent: I'm Enterprise
- Notable work: Dr. Stone as Chrome; Stars Align as Rintarō Futsu; Bottom-tier Character Tomozaki as Fumiya Tomozaki; Pretty Boy Detective Club as Sōsaku Yubiwa; High Card as Finn Oldman; Heavenly Delusion as Maru

Gen Satō (佐藤 元, Satō Gen; born March 22, 1997) is a Japanese voice actor. He is affiliated with I'm Enterprise. He is known for his roles as Chrome in Dr. Stone, Yamori Kou in Call of the Night, Rintarō Futsu in Stars Align, Fumiya Tomozaki in Bottom-tier Character Tomozaki, and Sōsaku Yubiwa in Pretty Boy Detective Club.

== Biography ==
Satō became interested in pursuing a career in voice acting during his third year of junior high school, after watching the anime series Star Driver. His family was not opposed to his decision provided that he also pursue college studies. While in university, he enrolled at the Japan Narration Actor Institute. After training, he passed an audition held by the talent agency I'm Enterprise and became formally affiliated with them in 2017.

In 2019, Satō voiced Chrome in the anime series Dr. Stone, and Rintarō Futsu in Stars Align. In 2021, he voiced Fumiya Tomozaki in Bottom-tier Character Tomozaki and Tomoyuki Kubota in Skate-Leading Stars. In 2022, he played the roles of Ko Yamori in Call of the Night and Ichibanboshi in Shine On! Bakumatsu Bad Boys!. Satō was one of the winners of the Best New Actor Award at the 16th Seiyu Awards.

== Filmography ==
=== Anime ===
2018

- Gundam Build Divers, Diver
- Golden Kamuy, Soldier (episode 1)
- Seven Senses of the Reunion, Adventurer, Player
- Cells at Work!, Red Blood Cell
- Persona 5: The Animation
- A Certain Magical Index III, Citizen (episode 3); Knight C (episode 12)
- Bloom Into You, Male student (episodes 2, 4)
- As Miss Beelzebub Likes, Purson

2019

- Endro!, Warrior
- That Time I Got Reincarnated as a Slime, Gale Gibson
- Sword Art Online: Alicization, Player
- Dr. Stone, Chrome
- Stars Align, Rintarō Futsu

2020

- King's Raid: Successors of the Will, Tam

2021

- Bottom-tier Character Tomozaki, Fumiya Tomozaki
- Skate-Leading Stars, Tomoyuki Kubota
- Dr. Stone: Stone Wars, Chrome
- Burning Kabaddi, Sōma Azemachi
- Pretty Boy Detective Club, Sо̄saku Yubiwa
- Fena: Pirate Princess, Enju
- Amaim Warrior at the Borderline, Amō Shiiba
- JoJo's Bizarre Adventure: Stone Ocean, Pi-Chan

2022

- Shine On! Bakumatsu Bad Boys!, Ichibanboshi
- Call of the Night, Ko Yamori
- Lucifer and the Biscuit Hammer, Mikazuki Shinonome
- Bibliophile Princess, Alan Ferrera

2023

- High Card, Finn Oldman
- Heavenly Delusion, Maru
- The Dangers in My Heart, Kenta Kanzaki
- Rokudo's Bad Girls, Tousuke Rokudō
- Insomniacs After School, Ganta

2024

- Beyblade X, Packun
- Bottom-tier Character Tomozaki 2nd Stage, Fumiya Tomozaki
- Cherry Magic! Thirty Years of Virginity Can Make You a Wizard?!, Minato Wataya
- Tales of Wedding Rings, Satou
- Twilight Out of Focus, Minoru Chiaki
- Uzumaki, Boy 1
- Is It Wrong to Try to Pick Up Girls in a Dungeon? V, Van

2025

- Übel Blatt, Zeffi
- The Beginning After the End, Elijah Knight
- Call of the Night Season 2, Ko Yamori

2026

- Dead Account, Minoru Wagari
- Easygoing Territory Defense by the Optimistic Lord, Xara
- Jujutsu Kaisen, Keita Oe
- Recommendations from Iwamoto-senpai, Ryū Sazame
- Tank Chair, Uzu

2027

- Tenkaichi: The Greatest Warrior Under the Rising Sun, Miyamoto Musashi

=== Video games ===
2021

- Jack Jeanne, Sōshirō Yonaga
- Fire Emblem Heroes, Saul

2023

- Arknights, Qanipalaat
- TEVI, Jethro

2026

- Genshin Impact, Alyosha

=== Dubbing ===
- No Hard Feelings (Percy Becker (Andrew Barth Feldman))
- Jurassic World Camp Cretaceous (Darius Bowman (Paul-Mikél Williams))
