= Masakazu Ishiguro =

Japanese manga artist (born 1977)

Masakazu Ishiguro 石黒正数
- Born: September 8, 1977 (age 49) Fukui, Fukui Prefecture, Japan
- Area: Manga artist
- Notable works: And Yet the Town Moves; Heavenly Delusion
- Awards: Seiun Award for Best Comic; Japan Media Arts Festival Excellence Award; Kono Manga ga Sugoi! Best Manga for Male Readers

Masakazu Ishiguro (Japanese: 石黒正数, Hepburn: Ishiguro Masakazu; born September 8, 1977) is a Japanese manga artist. He debuted in 2000 with the one-shot Hero prior to launching And Yet the Town Moves in 2005, which won the Seiun Award for Best Comic and an Excellence Award at the Japan Media Arts Festival. In 2018, he launched Heavenly Delusion, which topped the Kono Manga ga Sugoi! guidebook's list of the top manga for male readers.

== Biography ==
Ishiguro was born in Fukui on September 8, 1977. Ishiguro was fond of Fujiko Fujio's works growing up, especially Doraemon. When Ishiguro was in middle school, his dad rented Akira from a rental store and watched it with Ishiguro, who cites it as a major influence over his work. Ishiguro later said that growing up he felt that becoming a manga artist was "the only way to go". Ishiguro eventually graduated from Osaka University of Arts in 2001.

Just prior to graduation, Ishiguro submitted the one-shot Hero to Kodansha's Monthly Afternoon magazine, which won the Afternoon Shiki Shō in 2000. Soon after, he left Monthly Afternoon and published one-shots and short series in other magazines. In 2005, Ishiguro launched And Yet the Town Moves, which received an anime adaptation. In 2018, Ishiguro returned to Monthly Afternoon with Heavenly Delusion, which also received an anime adaptation.

Ishiguro has stated that the post-apocalyptic world in Heavenly Delusion was inspired by his interest in Japan's reconstruction period following World War II, during which he studied declassified American photographic archives to realistically portray landscapes in ruins.

== Works ==
=== Series ===
Title	Year	Magazine	Publisher(s)	Notes	Ref.
Agape: Hanzai Kōshō Nin Ichi-jō Haruka (アガペ -犯罪交渉人 一乗はるか-)	2004–2006	Monthly Comic Flapper	Media Factory	With Jun Kashima	
And Yet the Town Moves (それでも町は廻っている, Soredemo Machi wa Mawatteiru)	2005–2016	Young King OURs	Shōnen Gahōsha		
Nemurubaka (ネムルバカ)	2006–2008	Monthly Comic Ryū	Tokuma Shoten		
Skygrazer (外天楼, Getenrō)	2008–2011	Mephisto	Kodansha		
Kyōko to Tōsan (響子と父さん)	2008–2010	Monthly Comic Ryū	Tokuma Shoten		
Mokuyōbi no Furutto (木曜日のフルット)	2009–present	Weekly Shōnen Champion	Akita Shoten		
Heavenly Delusion (天国大魔境, Tengoku Daimakyō)	2018–present	Monthly Afternoon	Kodansha		
Yankī Jō-chan no Futashikana Shinjitsu (ヤンキー嬢ちゃんの不確かな真実)	2019–present	Bessatsu Shōnen Champion	Akita Shoten		

=== Anthologies ===
Title	Year	Publisher(s)	Notes	Ref.
Present for Me	2007	Shōnen Gahōsha		
Tantei Kitan (探偵綺譚)	2007	Tokuma Shoten		
Positive Sensei (ポジティブ先生)	2010	Tokuma Shoten		

== Awards ==
Year	Award	Category	Work/Recipient	Result	Ref
2012	5th Manga Taishō	Grand Prize	Skygrazer	Nominated	
2013	17th Japan Media Arts Festival Manga Division	Excellence Award	And Yet the Town Moves	Won	
2017	Da Vinci	Book of the Year	And Yet the Town Moves	44th place	
2018	Kono Manga ga Sugoi!	Best Manga for Male Readers	And Yet the Town Moves	20th place	
2018	49th Seiun Award	Best Comic	And Yet the Town Moves	Won	
2018	22nd Tezuka Osamu Cultural Prize	Grand Prize	And Yet the Town Moves	Nominated	
2019	Kono Manga ga Sugoi!	Best Manga for Male Readers	Heavenly Delusion	1st place	
2023	Japan Expo Awards	Daruma Award for the Best Screenplay	Heavenly Delusion	Won	
