= And Yet the Town Moves =

Japanese manga series

- First tankōbon volume cover, featuring Hotori Arashiyama

それでも町は廻っている (Soredemo Machi wa Mawatteiru)
- Genre: Comedy; Slice of life
- Manga
- Written by: Masakazu Ishiguro
- Published by: Shōnen Gahōsha
- English publisher: NA: JManga (former, digital); Crunchyroll (digital); BookWalker (digital); Manga Planet (former, digital)
- Magazine: Young King OURs
- Original run: March 30, 2005 – October 28, 2016
- Volumes: 16
- Anime television series
- Directed by: Akiyuki Shinbo (Note: Chief Director (総監督).); Naoyuki Tatsuwa (Note: Assistant Director (副監督). See the Shaft directors credit legend. Chief director Shinbo also referred to Tatsuwa as the Series Director (シリーズディレクター) in an interview.)
- Produced by: Mitsutoshi Kubota; Shinichi Nakamura; Junichirō Tanaka; Shōsei Itō; Chiaki Terada; Tomohiro Fujita
- Written by: Katsuhiko Takayama
- Music by: Round Table
- Studio: Shaft
- Licensed by: NA: Sentai Filmworks
- Original network: TBS
- Original run: October 8, 2010 – December 24, 2010
- Episodes: 12
- icon

And Yet the Town Moves (Japanese: それでも町は廻っている, Hepburn: Soredemo Machi wa Mawatteiru), abbreviated as Soremachi (それ町), is a Japanese manga series written and illustrated by Masakazu Ishiguro. It was serialized in the monthly magazine Young King OURs from March 2005 to October 2016, and was collected into 16 bound volumes. The series follows the exploits of whiny Hotori Arashiyama, her friends, family, neighbors, shopkeepers and colleagues at the local maid café. The slice of life format is occasionally interspersed with stories dealing with aliens, ghosts, and the paranormal.

An anime television series adaptation by Shaft was broadcast from October to December 2010. The manga was first licensed by JManga, then Crunchyroll; in 2020 it was also licensed by Manga Planet with the name SoreMachi: And Yet the Town Moves.

In 2018, And Yet the Town Moves won the 49th Seiun Award for the Best Comic category, as well as the Excellence Award at the 17th Japan Media Arts Festival in 2013.

== Plot ==
Hotori Arashiyama is a high school girl who works part-time as a waitress at Seaside coffee shop in the Maruko shopping district. One day, the owner, Uki Isobata, comes up with a secret plan to make the restaurant prosperous. It was to turn Seaside into a popular maid café. However, none of the people involved knew about maid cafes, and under the simple idea that if the waitresses wore maid clothes, it would be a maid cafe, and Seaside restarted as a maid cafe.

== Characters ==
=== Main characters ===
Hotori Arashiyama (嵐山 歩鳥, Arashiyama Hotori)
Voiced by: Chiaki Omigawa
Hotori is the clumsy, whiny and happy-go-lucky but mostly good-natured and well-meaning main protagonist of the series. Arguably the most well-known girl in town, she is very knowledgeable of all there is worth knowing about in their community. Possessing a face of childlike innocence, older townsfolk treat Hotori as a granddaughter while toddlers are effortlessly amused much to her annoyance. She is a huge fan of detective fiction and mystery novels; her deep dislike of mathematics stems from her belief that it offers little value for aspiring detectives such as herself. These unusual interests put her at odds against her math teacher (she has good grades in all her other subjects) and the town's patrolling police officer (she has vigilante tendencies). After being reminded by the Maid Seaside Café owner of all the free curry meals she enjoyed there as a child, Hotori began working part-time in the restaurant. Having almost non-existent cooking skills coupled with her lack of female charisma, Hotori is relegated into cleaning duties and running errands. Despite her limitations, she is very earnest in her work and genuinely wants to help not only the elderly proprietress but also the shopping district as a whole.
Toshiko Tatsuno (辰野 俊子, Tatsuno Toshiko)
Voiced by: Aoi Yūki
Toshiko is the pretty and well-endowed friend of Hotori. She decided to work in the same café when she discovered that her crush, their classmate Hiroyuki Sanada, is the lone regular customer. Her superb culinary talents and irresistible feminine charm instantly make her an indispensable asset for Maid Seaside Cafe; she has the desirable qualities of a maid that proprietress Uki Isohata has not found in Hotori. Toshiko's only failing is that her lack of humility more often than not manifests into arrogance. Even if her brutally frank personality often clashes against Hotori's immature antics, they are still very close friends. She disapproves of Hotori's childish habit of nicknaming her "Tattsun" (sometimes extended even further into "Tattsun-tsun"), but later relents when the moniker catches on and everyone else begins using it.
Hiroyuki Sanada (真田 広章, Sanada Hiroyuki)
Voiced by: Miyu Irino
Hotori's childhood friend and classmate. As the only child of a widowed fish merchant, Hiroyuki helps out often at their shop; he is quite skilled in preparing and cooking seafood. Being raised alone by a rarely affectionate father who was also known as a local troublemaker, they act more like siblings in a love-hate relationship. With his teen-idol good looks and congeniality, Toshiko is very enamored of him. But Hiroyuki hardly notices her advances because of his longtime secret crush on his childhood friend. Whenever he is alone with Hotori, he often fantasizes scenarios wherein he is able to muster enough courage to finally confess his feelings for her.
Uki Isohata (磯端 ウキ, Isohata Uki)
Voiced by: Takahiro Sakurai
Proprietress and head maid of the Maid Seaside Café, Uki took over the ownership of the restaurant after her husband died more than a decade earlier. To keep up with the current trend of the present generation, she converted her curry shop into a maid-themed cafe. Business started slow because the restaurant was severely understaffed with just her doing the cooking and Hotori waiting on the tables. Though they are unrelated, Hotori has known her for a long time and lovingly calls her "Granny". Although somewhat tyrannical at times, Uki genuinely cares for the well-being of others and is a well-respected elder in their community. Aside from her troublesome spine, she appears to be in good health and is still quite outgoing for someone her age.
Harue Haribara (針原 春江, Haribara Harue)
Voiced by: Ryoko Shiraishi
Buck-toothed classmate of Hotori and table-tennis ace.
Natsuhiko Moriaki (森秋 夏彦, Moriaki Natsuhiko)
Voiced by: Tomokazu Sugita
Oya High School mathematics teacher. He is also Hotori's homeroom teacher and sees her as one of his two nemeses (the other being his own math teacher from childhood). Hotori has a crush on him.
Futaba Kon (紺 双葉, Kon Futaba)
Voiced by: Rieka Yazawa
Initially mistaken as a younger boy by Hotori due to her short hair and slight build, she is in fact an upperclassman at Oya High School and the most laid-back member of its ping-pong club. Despite her seemingly uncaring personality and non-conformist nature, she is unexpectedly devoted to her parents and a good friend especially towards Hotori. Futaba plays bass guitar and is a cat-lover.

=== Arashiyama household ===
Ayumu Arashiyama (嵐山 歩, Arashiyama Ayumu)
Voiced by: Yūki Ono
Hotori's father.
Yukimi Arashiyama (嵐山 雪美, Arashiyama Yukimi)
Voiced by: Miyu Matsuki
Hotori's mother.
Takeru Arashiyama (嵐山 猛, Arashiyama Takeru)
Voiced by: Mutsumi Tamura
Hotori's younger brother. 7 years younger than Hotori.
Yukiko Arashiyama (嵐山 雪子, Arashiyama Yukiko)
Voiced by: Eri Sendai
Hotori's sister and youngest member of the family. 3 years younger than Takeru. Also likes detective stories and has good investigative skills herself.
Josephine (ジョセフィーヌ, Josefīnu)
Voiced by: Miyu Matsuki
The Arashiyama family's pet dog, resembling a Japanese raccoon dog. In the anime, she ends all of her sentences with "poko".

=== Townspeople ===
Shunsaku Matsuda (松田 旬作, Matsuda Shunsaku)
Voiced by: Shigeru Chiba
Hotori's arch-nemesis, the local police officer.
Yuuji Sanada (真田 勇司, Sanada Yūji)
Voiced by: Takaya Kuroda
Fishmonger and father to Hiroyuki.
Takanori Kikuchi (菊池 貴則, Kikuchi Takanori)
Voiced by: Nobuaki Kanemitsu
Owner of the grocery store and frequent visitor to the café.
Kazutoyo Arai (荒井 和豊, Arai Kazutoyo)
Voiced by: Toshiharu Sakurai
Owner of the laundry and frequent visitor to the café.
Shizuka Kameidō (亀井堂 静, Kameidō Shizuka)
Voiced by: Satsuki Yukino
Clumsy owner of the local antique shop.
Eri Isezaki (伊勢崎 恵梨, Isezaki Eri)
Voiced by: Emiri Katō
Tsundere classmate of Takeru, whom she has a crush on. Her nickname is "Ebi-chan".

== Media ==
=== Manga ===
Written and illustrated by Masakazu Ishiguro, And Yet the Town Moves was serialized in Shōnen Gahōsha's seinen manga monthly magazine Young King OURs from March 30, 2005, (Note: It debuted in the magazine's May 2005 issue, released on March 30 of that same year.) to October 28, 2016. Shōnen Gahōsha collected its chapters in 16 tankōbon volumes, released from January 2, 2006, to February 14, 2017.

It was originally published in English through JManga from its launch on August 17, 2011, until its shutdown on May 30, 2013, but it was later simultaneously published online by Crunchyroll since February 28, 2014. BookWalker also released the first ten English digital book volumes for purchase on November 17, 2015. In 2020, it was also licensed by Manga Planet under the name SoreMachi: And Yet the Town Moves, who released it digitally from May 20, 2020, to May 26, 2021.

==== Volumes ====
No.	Japanese release date	Japanese ISBN
1	January 2, 2006	978-4-7859-2604-5
1. "The Blessed Café (Before)" (至福の店 ビフォア, Shifuku no Mise Bifoa); 2. "The Blessed Café (After)" (至福の店 アフター, Shifuku no Mise Afutā); 3. "Sexual Harassment Trial" (セクハラ裁判, Sekuhara Saiban); 4. "Eyes" (目, Me); 5. "Romantic Runaway" (愛の逃避行, Ai no Tōhikō); 6. "Tatsuno Toshiko Never Breaks" (辰野トシ子は砕けない, Tatsuno Toshiko wa Kudakenai); 7. "Space Adventure Romance" (宇宙冒険ロマン, Uchū Bōken Roman); 8. "The Poster Girl Is World Famous" (看板娘は大人気, Kanban Musume wa Dai Ninki); 9. "Equation of Love" (恋の方程式, Koi no Hōteishiki); 10. "Kamaboko Bounce" (カマボコ ボヨン ボヨン, Kamaboko Boyon Boyon); 11. "Cat Boy" (猫少年, Neko Shōnen)
2	October 26, 2006	978-4-7859-2707-3
12. "An Invitation from a Sweet Maiden Is a Trap from Hell?!" (乙女の誘いは奈落の罠!?, Otome no Sasoi wa Naraku no Wana!?); 13. "And Yet the Town Moves (Before)" (それでも町は廻っている（前編）, Soredemo Machi wa Mawatteiru (Zenpen)); 14. "And Yet the Town Moves (After)" (それでも町は廻っている（後編）, Soredemo Machi wa Mawatteiru (Kōhen)); 15. "Angel in Pajamas" (パジャマの天使, Pajama no Tenshi); 16. "Night Walker" (ナイトウォーカー, Naito Wōkā); 17. "Maid Delivery Service" (出張メイドサービス, Shutchō Meido Sābisu); 18. "Hole" (穴, Ana); 19. "Summer of Josephine" (ジョセフィーヌの夏, Josefīnu no Natsu)
3	August 3, 2007	978-47859-2827-8
"The Beach House Tearjerker" (海の家号泣事件, Umi no Ie Gōkyū Jiken); 20. "Pandora's Box" (パンドラの箱, Pandora no Hako); 21. "Labyrinth Orchestra" (迷路楽団, Meiro Gakudan); 22. "One or Eight" (ワン・オア・エイト, Wan oa Eito); 23. "Save the Santa Dream" (まもれ サンタの夢, Mamore Santa no Yume); 24. "Detective Girls" (Detective girls, Ditekutibu Gāruzu); 25. "Cursed Roulette" (呪いのルーレット, Noroi no Rūretto); 26. "Birth of the Young Girl Detective" (少女探偵誕生, Shōjo Tantei Tanjō); 27. "One or Eight Again" (ワン・オア・エイト・アゲイン, Wan oa Eito Agein); 28. "Wisecracking Old Man" (ツッコミじいさん, Tsukkomi Jii San)
4	March 19, 2008	978-4-7859-2926-8
29. "Arashiyama Treasure Hunters" (嵐山財宝調査隊, Arashiyama Zaihō Chōsa Tai); 30. "Maid Detective Delivers Big" (メイド探偵大活躍, Meido Tantei Dai Katsuyaku); 31. "A Bowl of Machine Soba" (一ぱいのミシンそば, Ippai no Mishin Soba); 32. "Battle! Fairy vs. Reaper" (激突! 妖精VS死神, Gekitotsu! Yōsei Bāsasu Shinigami); 33. "Very Weak Card" (実に微妙なカード, Jitsu ni Bimyō na Kādo); 34. "A Dumb Way to Spend New Year's" (まぬけな正月の過ごし方, Manuke na Shōgatsu no Sugoshi Kata)
5	December 26, 2008	978-4-7859-3086-8
35. "Tale of the Visitor in the Snow" (下町雪訪い小話, Shitamachi Yukidoi Kobanashi); 36. "Graduation" (卒業式, Sotsugyō Shiki); 37. "Brain Cell Resurrection" (蘇る脳細胞, Yomigaeru Nōsaibō); 38. "We Aren't Machines!" (俺たちは機械じゃねぇ!, Oretachi wa Kikai Janē!); 39. "Novel Between Dream and Reality" (夢現小説, Yumeutsutsu Shōsetsu); 40. "Arashiyama House Fire" (嵐山家、火事になる, Arashiyama-ke, Kaji ni Naru); 41. "Stormy Night" (大嵐の夜に, Ōarashi no Yoru ni); 42. "School Labyrinth Guide" (学校迷宮案内, Gakkō Meikyū Annai)
6	October 30, 2009	978-4-7859-3256-5
43. "A Kiss with Hotori at the Flea Market" (フリーマーケットで歩鳥とキス, Furī Māketto de Hotori to Kisu); 44. "Tell It Like It Is" (ざっくばらん, Zakkubaran); 45. "Two Who Cannot Meet" (逢えない二人, Aenai Futari); 46. "Time Capsule" (タイムカプセル, Taimu Kapuseru); 47. "Hero Show" (ヒーローショー, Hīrō Shō); 48. "Hotori's First Time" (歩鳥初体験, Hotori Hatsutaiken); 49. "Kon-Senpai's Silent Rage" (紺先輩の静かな怒り, Kon Senpai no Shizuka na Ikari); 50. "Phantom Boy" (まぼろしの少年, Maboroshi no Shōnen)
7	April 30, 2010	978-4-7859-3376-0
51. "White Devil" (ホワイトデビル, Howaito Debiru); 52. "Autumn Festival" (秋まつり, Aki Matsuri); 53. "Contact" (コンタクト, Kontakuto); 54. "Disappointing Card" (ガッカリなカード, Gakkari na Kādo); 55. "Time Waits for No One" (時は待ってくれない, Toki wa Mattekurenai); 56. "Territory" (テリトリー, Teritorī); 57. "Soremachi Suspense Theater II" (それ町サスペンス劇場②, Soremachi Sasupensu Gekijō Ni); 58. "Bloody Valentine" (血のバレンタイン, Chi no Barentain)
8	November 30, 2010	978-4-7859-3519-1
59. "Smile Away" (笑ってごらん, Waratte Goran); 60. "Hotori and the Mysterious Kingdom" (歩鳥となぞの王国, Hotori to Nazo no Ōkoku); 61. "The Great Beast Appears at Oya High School" (大怪獣 尾谷校に現わる, Dai Kaijū Oyakō ni Arawaru); 62. "Dancing Dragnet" (踊る大捜査網, Odoru Dai Sōsa Mō); 63. "Kappa Quest" (KAPPA QUEST, Kappa Kuesuto); 64. "The Sign Is B!" (サインはB!, Sain wa Bī!); 65. "Farewell, Noodles" (さよなら麺類, Sayonara Menrui)
9	August 31, 2011	978-4-7859-3690-7
"Arashiyama Ninja Style" (嵐山忍法帳, Arashiyama Ninpō Chō); 66. "Burn, Hotori" (燃えよ 歩鳥, Moeyo Hotori); 67. "Return Jealous Look" (答砲悋気, Tōhō Rinki); 68. "Arashiyama Josephine-Sama" (嵐山ジョセフィーヌ様, Arashiyama Josefīnu Sama); 69. "Bleeding Process" (流血のプロセス, Ryūketsu no Purosesu); 70. "Impulse Buying like a Boss" (大人買い計画, Otonagai Keikaku); 71. "Walking Bird" (歩く鳥, Aruku Tori); 72. "The Ghost of Ri-Chan the Liar" (嘘つきリッちゃんの亡霊, Usotsuki Ri' Chan no Bōrei); 73. "Moriaki in the Night Sky" (森秋 夜空に散る, Moriaki Yozora ni Chiru)
10	July 30, 2012	978-4-7859-3888-8
74. "Diary About a Sister" (アネの日記, Ane no Nikki); 75. "Futaba Dead End" (フタバ・デッドエンド, Futaba Deddo Endo); 76. "Arashiyama Family Housework" (嵐山家 家事担う, Arashiyama-ke Kaji Ninau); 77. "Nest" (巣, Su); 78. "Detective Girls 2" (Detective girls 2, Ditekutibu Gāruzu Tsū); 79. "Hotori's War" (歩鳥の戦争, Hotori no Sensō); 80. "Mysterious Disk" (謎の円盤, Nazo no Enban); 81. "Hotori's First Kiss" (歩鳥ファーストキス, Hotori Fāsuto Kisu)
11	February 28, 2013	978-4-7859-4027-0
82. "The Final Mystery" (最後の謎, Saigo no Nazo); 83. "The Voice That Lurks in the Darkness" (闇に棲む声, Yami ni Sumu Koe); 84. "The Twilight Town" (夕闇の町, Yūyami no Machi); 85. "Kon-Senpai Is a Mystery!" (紺先輩は謎だ!, Kon Senpai wa Nazo Da!); 86. "Bad Boys & Fly Girls Ensemble Theater" (非行少年飛行少女群像劇, Hikō Shōnen Hikō Shōjo Gunzōgeki); 87. "The Conspiracy Is in the Fog" (陰謀は霧の中, Inbō wa Kiri no Naka); 88. "Miracle Super Lucky Ring" (ミラクルスーパーラッキー指輪, Mirakuru Sūpā Rakkī Yubiwa); 89. "The Adventure of the Speckled Band, Modern Version" (現代版まだらの紐, Gendai Ban Madara no Himo)
12	December 26, 2013	978-4-7859-5174-0
90. "The Vanishing Case" (消された事件, Kesareta Jiken); 91. "A Dumb Way to Spend New Year's Eve" (まぬけな大晦日の過ごし方, Manuke na Ōmisoka no Sugoshi Kata); 92. "Night Stalker" (ナイトストーカー, Naito Sutōkā); 93. "Hotori Solves a Mystery at a Kotatsu" (歩鳥はコタツで推理する, Hotori wa Kotatsu de Suiri Suru); 94. "A-ko-ga-re Longing" (A・KO・GA・REロンギング, Akogare Rongingu); 95. "Yukiko's Swordsmanship" (ユキコの剣, Yukiko no Ken); 96. "Ghost Painting" (幽霊絵画, Yūrei Kaiga); 97. "Two Girls Adrift in the Pacific" (二少女漂流記, Ni Shōjo Hyōryūki); 98. "Epilogue" (エピローグ, Epirōgu)
13	September 30, 2014	978-4-7859-5393-5
99. "Stake Out" (張り込み, Harikomi); 100. "The Case of the Dog" (犬事件, Inu Jiken); 101. "The Unpopular Gentleman" (モテない紳士, Motenai Shinshi); 102. "Abandoned Village" (廃村, Haison); 103. "Gone into the Darkness" (闇の中の消失, Yami no Naka no Shōshitsu); 104. "Ping Pong Girl of Darkness" (暗黒卓球少女, Ankoku Takkyū Shōjo); 105. "Cursed Video" (呪いのビデオ, Noroi no Bideo)
14	May 30, 2015	978-4-7859-5561-8
106. "Library Agent" (図書館の回し者, Toshokan no Mawashimono); 107. "Hotori Sunk" (歩鳥撃沈, Hotori Gekichin); 108. "Novel Between Dream and Reality - Continued" (続・夢現小説, Zoku-Yumeutsutsu Shōsetsu); 109. "Doppelganger" (ドッペルゲンガー, Dopperugengā); 110. "With Big Sister" (お姉さんといっしょ, O Nē San to Issho); 111. "Fantasy Novel" (夢幻小説, Yumemaboroshi Shōsetsu); 112. "The Lobster Returns a Favor" (エビの恩返し, Ebi no Ongaeshi); 113. "Red" (赤, Aka)
15	April 30, 2016	978-4-7859-5767-4
114. "School Trip" (修学旅行, Shūgaku Ryokō); 115. "Flying Bird" (飛ぶ鳥, Tobu Tori); 116. "The Untold Story of the Mysterious Glasses Disappearance" (メガネ行方不明事件の全貌, Megane Yukue Fumei Jiken no Zenbō); 117. "False" (虚, Kyo); 118. "Botan Doro" (牡丹灯籠, Botan Dōrō); 119. "Shy Boys and Bad Girls" (不猟少年不良少女群像劇, Furyō Shōnen Furyō Shōjo Gunzōgeki); 120. "Tatsuno Toshiko's Friend" (辰野俊子のお友達, Tatsuno Toshiko no O Tomodachi); 121. "Migrating Bird" (立つ鳥, Tatsu Tori)
16	February 14, 2017	978-4-7859-5959-3
122. "Dream of the Future" (未来の夢, Mirai no Yume); 123. "Detective Girls Final" (Detective girls final, Ditekutibu Gāruzu Fainaru); 124. "Huge Case" (大事件, Dai Jiken); 125. "Kon-Senpai Special" (紺先輩 スペシャル, Kon Senpai Supesharu); 126. "Evil" (悪, Aku); 127. "The Blessed Café (Forever)" (至福の店 フォーエバー, Shifuku no Mise Fōebā); 128. "Gone with the Wind" (嵐と共に去りぬ, Arashi to Tomo ni Sarinu); 129. "Girl A" (少女A, Shōjo Ē); "Epilogue" (エピローグ, Epirōgu)

===== Chapters not in volume format =====
These chapters have not been collected into volumes. They were published in issues of Young King Ours in May 2009 and November 2015. They can be found in the Soremachi Official Guide Book which was released on the same date as the final volume.

- 53. "Lock" (ロック, Rokku)
- 128. "Time Bomb" (時限爆弾, Jigen Bakudan)

=== Anime ===
The manga has been adapted into a 12-episode anime series that started airing on October 8, 2010. The anime is chief directed by Akiyuki Shinbo, with assistant direction by Naoyuki Tatsuwa, and produced by Shaft. J-pop band Round Table composed the music, Katsuhiko Takayama acted as series composition writer, and Hiroki Yamamura (Studio Pastoral) designed the characters. Yamamura, Yasutoshi Iwasaki, and Miyako Nishida (NEOX) served as chief animation directors. Half of the series was outsourced outside of Shaft: episodes 3 and 6 to Magic Bus; episodes 4 and 10 to Studio Pastoral; episode 8 to Doga Kobo; and episode 11 to Diomedéa. (Note: Outsourcing studios credited as Production Assistance (制作協力) on their respective episodes.)

The opening theme is Down Town by Maaya Sakamoto and the ending theme is Maids Sanjou! (メイズ参上！) by Maids (the main female cast) and arranged by Round Table, both released by Victor Entertainment. The CD of Down Town was released in Japan on October 20, 2010, and the CD of Maids Sanjou! was released on November 24, 2010. The first Blu-ray/DVD of the series was released in Japan on December 24, 2010, and the sixth and last on June 15, 2011. At Anime Weekend Atlanta 2011, Sentai Filmworks announced that they have licensed the anime, and they released it on DVD on January 3, 2012, and on Blu-ray on June 21, 2016. Anime Network streamed the series in North America from June 15 to August 31, 2012.

==== Episodes ====
No.	Title	Directed by (Note: Information is taken from the ending credits of each episode.)	Written by	Storyboarded by	Original release date
1	"Happiness Café Before/After" "Shifuku no Mise Bifōafutā" (Japanese: 至福の店ビフォーアフター)	Tomoyuki Itamura	Katsuhiko Takayama	Naoyuki Tatsuwa	October 8, 2010
At the Seaside maid café, Hotori Arashiyama is copying Hiroyuki Sanada's math homework. For Hiroyuki, being this close to Hotori is a dream come true. The next morning at Oya High School, teacher Natsuhiko Moriaki castigates Hotori for copying. She complains to friends Toshiko Tatsuno and Harue Haribara that the stern lecture she will receive after school will make her late for her new part time job at the café. Toshiko has a certain ideal of what a maid café should be and asks if she can visit. Upon arrival, she is severely disappointed with the welcome and level of service she receives. She demonstrates how a real café maid would welcome a customer. Proprietress Uki Isohata is so impressed with Toshiko's performance that she offers her a job on the spot. Toshiko cannot accept due to her school club commitments, but does offer to train Hotori. The next customer to enter the café gets the full "Welcome home, master" treatment from Hotori, but he misinterprets the greeting and makes a pass at her. Hotori strikes him. Toshiko's lesson continues with her teaching Hotori to use clumsiness as a charm point, with disastrous results. Customer number two is Hiroyuki. After learning that he is a regular, smitten Toshiko reconsiders Uki's offer and accepts the maid job. The following day, Hotori and Toshiko are caught heading to work by Mr Moriaki. Despite trying to escape, he manages to follow them to the café. He insists that they both obtain parental and school permission to work. Using their maid charms the two girls have a battle of wills with their teacher. Only when he is lecturing Hotori about her absentmindedness does Toshiko realize that Mr. Moriaki has forgotten about their getting permission to work.
2	"The Most Popular Sexual Harassment Trial" "Sekuhara Saiban ga Dai Ninki" (Japanese: セクハラ裁判が大人気)	Naoyuki Tatsuwa	Katsuhiko Takayama	Naoyuki Tatsuwa	October 15, 2010
3	"The Cat Boy" "Neko Shōnen" (Japanese: 猫省年)	Mitsutaka Noshitani	Katsuhiko Takayama	Takuya Satō	October 22, 2010
4	"The Curse of the Equation" "Noroi no Hōteishiki" (Japanese: 呪いの方程式)	Yoshihiro Mori	Katsuhiko Takayama	Yoshihiro Mori	October 29, 2010
5	"Tatsuno Toshiko is Quite Subtle" "Jitsu ni Bimyō na Tatsuno Toshiko" (Japanese: 実に微妙な辰野トシ子)	Yuki Yase	Miku Ooshima	Kazuma Fujimori	November 5, 2010
Toshiko Tatsuno has a ticket for an advance film screening and desperately wants to ask Hiroyuki Sanada on a date. Unfortunately, she is a little shy and despite her best efforts, is unable to summon the courage to ask him out. Hotori gets the tickets instead and Toshiko waits for Hiroyuki to come to the cafe for his usual homework session. In part two, Hotori's brother Takeru and his friends are getting hassled at school by tsundere classmate Eri Isezaki, who complains that they're constantly playing a trading card game, which is against school rules. One day during class, a note from Eri lands on his desk asking to 'hang out'. Takeru is surprised when she actually carries out her threat and turns up on his doorstep. With a ¥1000 note donated by Hotori, the two wander around town eating ice cream, visit a sweet shop and narrowly avoid Takeru's friends. The next time they meet at school, Eri punishes Takeru for using her nickname "Ebi-chan", indicating that, for now, their friendship should remain a secret. Meanwhile, Hotori challenges her younger sister Yukiko to prove her worth as a detective by finding out as much 'dirt' on her as she can. Yukiko spies on Hotori and discovers her diary.
6	"Pandora Maid Service" "Pandora Meido Sābisu" (Japanese: パンドラメイドサービス)	Tomokazu Tokoro; Naoyuki Tatsuwa; Yasutoshi Iwasaki	Miku Ooshima	Tomokazu Tokoro	November 12, 2010
While searching for a birthday present for Tatsuno, Hotori visits clumsy Shizuka Kameidō's antiques store. Shizuka offers Hotori an African mask that grants the wearer the ability to locate anyone and anything (including lovers). At Tatsuno's early birthday party, Hotori presents her gift: a strange locked box, missing its key. Hotori tries to discover everyone else's birth-dates, but Futaba changes the subject each time she is asked. When Hotori extracts Futaba's student ID card from her bag, she discovers that today is also her birthday, causing much consternation. Hotori meekly offers Futaba the love mask, but she and Tatsuno decide to swap presents. Futaba picks the box's lock and finds love charms inside. After discovering that the mask only finds lovers of African origin, Tatsuno returns it to Shizuka's antique store. In part two, the students are tasked with creating and uploading a website. Hotori decides to build one for the café. Using photos of Tatsuno in maid costume as payment, Hotori purchases from a classmate a cute illustration for the home page. In order to complete the site, she and Tatsuno head over to Hiroyuki's house. With little warning of their arrival, Hiroyuki has just minutes to clean up and hide his porn collection, which includes deleting hundreds of images from his computer. After discovering that he does not have a scanner, the girls leave... but not before discovering his porn magazines on top of a bookshelf. The pair next head over to Futaba's apartment in order to care for their sick friend. A delirious Futaba attacks after accidentally calling them "Mommy". After calming her down and putting her back to bed, Hotori discovers an electric bass guitar and wakes the neighborhood by strumming it. The next day, everyone seems to have caught the cold virus, except Hotori (because "only idiots don't catch cold").
7	"Lovers Night Escape" "Ai no Naitō Hikou" (Japanese: 愛のナイトウ避行)	Tomoyuki Itamura	Miku Ooshima	Tomoyuki Itamura	November 19, 2010
Hiroyuki leaves home in a bad mood after a disappointing breakfast, only to meet a tired looking Hotori at the bus stop. She explains that the previous day she arrived late at school and was made to stand in the corridor until homeroom was over. Not wanting to repeat the experience she woke up extra early, despite staying up late reading. Unfortunately, she falls asleep on Hiroyuki who, not wanting to disturb her and aching to fulfill today's blood horoscope prophecy, allows the bus to pass school and proceed to the next town. Due to the nice weather, Hiroyuki proposes taking the entire day off. Hotori agrees and takes his hand. In part two, it is past 11pm and Hotori's younger brother Takeru cannot sleep. A visit to his big sister's room finds her still awake. To help him sleep, Hotori suggests a night-time walk around the neighborhood. Spotting that Sanada's bedroom light is still on, the two try to attract his attention with a slingshot and acorns, with disastrous effect. After escaping they head out for ramen, but have to dodge the district's police officer. In a convenience store, Takeru witnesses the change of day for the first time. Back home the siblings share a hot bath together, and Takeru realizes that his sister knows too much about the night and must be sneaking out often.
8	"Automatic Orchestra" "Zenjidō Gakudan" (Japanese: 全自動楽団)	Naoyuki Tatsuwa	Katsuhiko Takayama	Naoyuki Tatsuwa	November 26, 2010
Hotori, Futaba and Toshiko are sheltering from heavy rain under the laundromat awning and complaining about the weather forecasters. Hotori suggests using the dryers inside to dry their clothing. While objecting on the grounds that they do not have anything else to wear, Toshiko pulls at the awning, soaking them all thoroughly. With little alternative, they head inside. After a liberating wait the three are back in warm clothes and Hotori decides to warm her insides with udon from an astonishing vending machine. Futaba follows suit and Toshiko plumps for a vending machine burger with dodgy ingredients. Later that night, hunger pangs bring Hotori back to the laundromat where she discovers Futaba. During an interlude, Toshiko has to ask Hiroyuki to open a pot of honey, which he does. Pleased at having a conversation opener, she scours the café kitchen for more jars with sticky lids. Hotori notices Uki's laddered stockings causing Hiroyuki to be caught out looking at Uki's legs. In part two, the school Cultural Festival approaches, but Hotori's class is not doing anything for it. Futaba bursts into the café with a stage ticket she has won and suggests forming a band. Hotori says she can play something keyboard-like, and Toshiko something guitar-ish. Harue has already been roped in as drummer. Accordions and violins are not what Futaba had in mind, but they proceed anyway. Toshiko has some luck with Hiroyuki when he agrees to watch her perform. "The Maids" folk song goes down well with the festival crowd.
9	"Duel! Adults Buying Plan" "Gekitotsu! Otonagai Keikaku" (Japanese: 激突！大人買い計画)	Yuki Yase	Katsuhiko Takayama	Akinobu Okada (Note: The pseudonym of an unknown director.)	December 3, 2010
At Shizuka's antiques store, a woman with green hair brings in a vase and seems to be in a hurry to sell it. The next day her husband sees his vase in the window and buys it back, only for it to be returned the following day by the wife. The process continues many times with Shizuka making a huge profit. Toshiko enjoys watching Hiroyuki playing basketball while Hotori fails at vaulting and table tennis. Hotori learns that among the table tennis squad, Futaba's name is revered and feared. Harue issues a match challenge to Toshiko, who not wanting to look bad in front of her love interest, plays a fantastic game but ultimately loses to her friend. The game had an effect on Hiroyuki, but for the wrong reasons. In part two, at Mouri's confectionery shop, a customer learns that the shop will be closing at the end of the month. He buys everything in the store and hands the sweets out on the street. Shizuka samples one of the Rainbow Delights and is enamored. Her quest to find more is thwarted at every turn, but she learns that others seek the maker. The girls in the café try to re-create the snack from the packet ingredients list but are unsuccessful. Hotori theorizes that the snack comes from the future. Strangely, she is not far off. In the year 2310, the woman with green hair asks the returned time-traveller what's the first thing he wants to do. Eat a Rainbow Delight he replies.
10	"Grandpa Tsukkomi" "Ana Tsukkomi Jii San" (Japanese: 穴ツッコミじいさん)	Yoshihiro Mori	Katsuhiko Takayama	Yoshihiro Mori	December 10, 2010
Hiroyuki prays at a shrine for him and Hotori to become closer. The television news channel reports that mysterious, perfectly circular holes have appeared in the neighborhood. At the breakfast table, Hotori watches sheepishly. Later at school, an excited Futaba questions her about the holes and asks to be taken to them. Hotori breaks down and admits that she caused them to appear. She recalls that on her way home from buying ice-cream the previous night, she came across a raygun lying in the road. Thinking it to be a child's toy she takes aim and triggers it, disintegrating a nearby sign. A huge metallic alien lands behind her and asks for the weapon. A second insectoid alien also appears demanding the gun and in the ensuing fight is disintegrated. The metallic alien grabs the raygun and departs. Fearing arrest for causing the damage, Hotori sobs. Futaba produces something she'd found from her pocket that can repair anything broken, and because of this believes Hotori's story. Back at the scene of the holes, Futaba repairs the damage, and unknowingly restores the insectoid alien. In part two, two old men sit on a bench. As one departs, it becomes clear that the other is a ghost. He tells the story of his death to Futaba's passing cat. Ignored by the collection angels, he is left to wander the town, tormenting dogs and waving his ghostly cane through the residents. The ghost is revealed to be Uki's late husband. Back at the shine, it appears that Hiroyuki's wish was overheard by the ghostly gentleman.
11	"Kon's Summer Crying" "Kon Senpai Gōkyū no Natsu" (Japanese: 紺先輩号泣の夏)	Toshikazu Yoshizawa	Katsuhiko Takayama	Kenichi Imaizumi	December 17, 2010
At the beach Hotori's exuberance results in her bursting a new inflatable ring, leaving her despondent. A storm rises up and takes away her new bikini top. Futaba tries to buy her a curry to cheer her up, but the kitchen has just closed. It is the worst summer break ever. Hotori's father, Ayumu Arashiyama awakes to take Josephine for her walk. He relishes the quiet of the morning, but keeps getting interrupted by shopkeepers warning of an approaching typhoon. Takeru and Yukiko beg their father to take them to the beach, but as he does not have a vacation, suggests Hotori take them to the pool instead. Unfortunately, she cannot go, as she has to attend remedial math class. Upon arrival she discovers that she is the only one there, much to the chagrin of her teacher. Mr. Moriaki tries to make Hotori understand math by comparing it to detective work. She is not convinced but tries anyway. Back home, Hotori takes Josephine for a walk and meets up with Harue and Futaba who point out that she resembles a tanuki, just like her dog. In a later dream, Josephine says goodbye and departs for the mountains, believing she really is a tanuki. Upon waking to the storm outside, Hotori finds Josephine's kennel empty and despairs. The dog is actually inside with the rest of the family. The next day Hotori attempts to train Josephine. Josephine believes the family's hierarchy to be Mom, Hotori, Yukiko, Takeru, herself and Dad in last place. After failing to train the dog, Hotori begins to understand Mr. Moriaki. Futaba returns home to find a showered Hotori sleeping in her bed, the air conditioning set to cold and a bottle of water removed from her fridge. To make matters worse, she has a stupid look on her face, an inflated rubber ring next to her, and has left the cat locked outside. In Hotori's dream, a race of Josephines attend to her every whim, but as Futaba snaps and opens the window to the hot air outside, Hotori's dream turns into a nightmare where she is burning. At the café, Toshiko is daydreaming. When Hiroyuki arrives, she tries to invite him to the beach, but instead mistakenly gives him the impression that Hotori has gone there with another man. A rain storm dampens everyone's spirits and steals Hotori's bikini top.
12	"Sore machi" "Sore Machi" (Japanese: それ町)	Naoyuki Tatsuwa	Katsuhiko Takayama	Naoyuki Tatsuwa; Akinobu Okada	December 24, 2010
At the café, Futaba and Toshiko are not on close speaking terms because of latter's refusal to join the high school table tennis club. To cheer everyone up, Hotori produces her new invention, a magnifying pendant, which she has altered to include a pen in its handle. Unfortunately the pen she chose to use is an expensive Montblanc pen, given to her as a gift by her uncle. Hotori goes home in a dazed state after learning how much they cost. Unable to repair the pen, her spirits are lifted when she sees a writing competition in one of her detective magazines. The first prize is ¥5million, the deadline three months away; just before she goes on holiday to her uncle's house. Hotori's Jelly Island Mystery is not very good and is dismissed early from the competition. She collapses in shock from the rejection letter and is promptly run over by a garbage truck. After a brief moment looking down at her body, she ascends (kicking and screaming) to heaven to stand before Anubis in the Hall of Two Truths, where her heart will be weighed against the feather of truth and justice. She is quickly dragged off to the Japanese line to learn her fate. A wise-cracking guide is assigned to her to show her around. Heaven is run-down and not at all what Hotori imagined it to be. She has fun using an afterlife photo booth to add spirit shadows to Futaba's photographs back on Earth. Using special binoculars to view her home, Hotori learns that she is not actually dead, but in a coma. She also sees how her absence has affected her family, friends and café patrons. Saddened, she sheds tears and expresses deep regret at having to leave early. The public-address system calls Hotori to the Heaven Immigration Bureau, where she learns that because her body survived the accident, she can return to Earth. Losing her memories of heaven, Hotori wakes up in the hospital. Later, Futaba shows her the photo of the two of them, in which a ghostly hand rests on Hotori's shoulder. She freaks out.

== Reception ==
On Kadokawa Media Factory's Da Vinci magazine "Book of the Year" list, the manga ranked 44th in the 2017 list. On Takarajimasha's Kono Manga ga Sugoi! ranking of top manga of 2018 for male readers, the manga ranked 20th.

And Yet the Town Moves was awarded the Excellence Award at the 17th Japan Media Arts Festival in the Manga Division in 2013; where the jury described the manga as one that can convey drama, happy daily lives and connection with people without depicting any dramatic or personal traumatic incidents. The jury members highly valued the work's realization of the "pursuit of cheerfulness", which they described as heliotropism, comparing it to works by Fujiko F. Fujio and Tetsuya Chiba, providing entertaining episodes with "high level contents every installment". The manga won the 49th Seiun Award for the Best Comic category in 2018. It was nominated for the 22nd Tezuka Osamu Cultural Prize in 2018.

== Notes ==
=== Works cited ===
- Shinbo, Akiyuki (2012). 新房語 [Shinbogatari] (in Japanese). Ichijinsha. ISBN 978-4758012591.
