= Wataru Katoh =

Japanese voice actor

- 加藤 渉
- Born: 17 July 1997 (age 29)
- Occupation: Voice actor
- Years active: 2016–present
- Employer: I'm Enterprise
- Notable work: Id – Invaded as Kokufu; Aoashi as Martis Jun Asari; The Legendary Hero Is Dead! as Touka Scott; Sweet Reincarnation as Squale Mill Kadorecheck; The 100 Girlfriends Who Really, Really, Really, Really, Really Love You as Rentaro Aijo; Kaiju No. 8 as Reno Ichikawa; Delicious in Dungeon as Kabru; You and I Are Polar Opposites as Taira

Wataru Katoh (Japanese: 加藤 渉, Hepburn: Katō Wataru; born 17 July 1997) is a Japanese voice actor from Tokyo, affiliated with I'm Enterprise. He is known for starring as Kokufu in Id – Invaded, Martis Jun Asari in Aoashi, Touka Scott in The Legendary Hero Is Dead!, Squale Mill Kadorecheck in Sweet Reincarnation, Rentaro Aijo in The 100 Girlfriends Who Really, Really, Really, Really, Really Love You, Reno Ichikawa in Kaiju No. 8, and Kabru in Delicious in Dungeon.

== Biography ==
Wataru Katoh, a native of Tokyo, was born on 17 July 1997 and educated at the Japan Narration Acting Institute. He joined I'm Enterprise in 2015, and he subsequently did voice acting for several anime series such as Long Riders!, Magic of Stella, Doreiku, Killing Bites, Ahiru no Sora, Hi Score Girl, Assault Lily Bouquet, and Higurashi When They Cry.

In 2020, he starred as Kokufu in Id – Invaded. He later starred as Martis Jun Asari in Aoashi and Touka Scott in The Legendary Hero Is Dead! In June 2023, he was cast as Squale Mill Kadorecheck in Sweet Reincarnation, and in August, he was cast as Reno Ichikawa in Kaiju No. 8. In 2024, he was cast as Kabru in Delicious in Dungeon and Fenfen in Dungeon People.

Since 2023, he has starred as Rentaro Aijo, the main protagonist in The 100 Girlfriends Who Really, Really, Really, Really, Really Love You.

== Filmography ==
=== Animated television ===
| Year | Title | Role(s) | Ref |
|---|---|---|---|
| 2016 | Long Riders! | | |
| 2016 | Magic of Stella | | |
| 2018 | Doreiku | | |
| 2018 | Killing Bites | | |
| 2018 | Mameneko | Megane | |
| 2019 | Ahiru no Sora | | |
| 2019 | Hi Score Girl | | |
| 2019 | RobiHachi | Team | |
| 2020 | Assault Lily Bouquet | | |
| 2020 | Higurashi When They Cry | | |
| 2020 | Id – Invaded | Kokufu | |
| 2021 | 2.43: Seiin High School Boys Volleyball Team | | |
| 2021 | 86 | | |
| 2021 | Amaim Warrior at the Borderline | | |
| 2021 | Combatants Will Be Dispatched! | | |
| 2022 | Aoashi | Martis Jun Asari | |
| 2022 | Kaguya-sama: Love Is War – Ultra Romantic | | |
| 2022 | Welcome to Demon School! Iruma-kun | Cosmo | |
| 2023 | Ayakashi Triangle | | |
| 2023 | Cardfight!! Vanguard will+Dress | | |
| 2023 | Don't Toy with Me, Miss Nagatoro | | |
| 2023 | Mobile Suit Gundam: The Witch from Mercury | | |
| 2023 | Sweet Reincarnation | Squale Mill Kadorecheck | |
| 2023 | The Legendary Hero Is Dead! | Touka Scott | |
| 2023 | The 100 Girlfriends Who Really, Really, Really, Really, Really Love You | Rentaro Aijo | |
| 2023 | Too Cute Crisis | Mokoro | |
| 2024 | Delicious in Dungeon | Kabru | |
| 2024 | Dungeon People | Fenfen | |
| 2024 | Kaiju No. 8 | Reno Ichikawa | |
| 2025 | May I Ask for One Final Thing? | Julius von Paristan | |
| 2026 | You and I Are Polar Opposites | Taira, Tempura | |
| 2026 | Red River | Kail Mursili | |
| 2027 | In a World Full of Zombies I'm the Only One Who Doesn't Get Attacked | Yūsuke Takemura | |

=== Animated film ===
| Year | Title | Role(s) | Ref |
|---|---|---|---|
| 2020 | Happy-Go-Lucky Days | | |
| 2020 | L'étranger de la Plage | | |
| 2021 | Farewell, My Dear Cramer: First Touch | Kishi | |
| 2021 | Sing a Bit of Harmony | | |
| 2022 | Fruits Basket: Prelude | | |
| 2022 | The First Slam Dunk | | |
