= In a World Full of Zombies I'm the Only One Who Doesn't Get Attacked =

Japanese light novel series

- First light novel volume cover

ゾンビのあふれた世界で俺だけが襲われない (Zonbi no Afureta Sekai de Ore Dake ga Osowarenai)
- Genre: Action
- Novel series
- Written by: Rokuro Uraji
- Published by: Nocturne Novels (Shōsetsuka ni Narō)
- Original run: January 9, 2013 – present
- Light novel
- Written by: Rokuro Uraji
- Illustrated by: Saburō
- Published by: Frontier Works
- Imprint: Nox Novels
- Original run: February 12, 2016 – present
- Volumes: 3
- Manga
- Written by: Rokuro Uraji
- Illustrated by: Chihiro Masuda
- Published by: Frontier Works
- English publisher: NA: MangaPlaza
- Magazine: Comic Ragchew
- Original run: June 25, 2021 – present
- Volumes: 5
- Manga

In a World Full of Zombies I'm the Only One Who Doesn't Get Attacked: Tokiko If Story
- Written by: Rokuro Uraji
- Illustrated by: Robo Kondo
- Published by: Frontier Works
- Magazine: Comic Ragchew
- Original run: October 25, 2025 – present
- Volumes: 1
- Anime television series
- Directed by: Kazuya Fujishiro
- Written by: Yasushi Hirano
- Music by: Isao
- Studio: Acca Effe; Frontier Engine
- Original network: AT-X
- Original run: January 2, 2027 – scheduled
- icon

In a World Full of Zombies I'm the Only One Who Doesn't Get Attacked (Japanese: ゾンビのあふれた世界で俺だけが襲われない, Hepburn: Zonbi no Afureta Sekai de Ore Dake ga Osowarenai; 'I Am the Only One Who Is Not Attacked in the World Filled with Zombies') is a Japanese light novel series written by Rokuro Uraji and illustrated by Saburō. It began serialization online in January 2013 on the Nocturne Novels male adult section of the user-generated novel publishing website Shōsetsuka ni Narō. It was later acquired by Frontier Works, who have published three volumes since February 2016 under their Nox Novels imprint. A manga adaptation with art by Chihiro Masuda has been serialized online via Frontier Works' Comic Ragchew website since June 2021 and has been collected in five tankōbon volumes. An anime television series adaptation produced by Acca Effe and Frontier Engine is set to premiere in January 2027.

== Plot ==
Yūsuke Takemura is an antisocial shut-in. On a rare day when he leaves his apartment, a mysterious man attacks and bites his arm. He returns to his room, but is bedridden with a fever for a few days. When he wakes up, he finds that zombies have emerged and invaded every corner of the world with survivors in hiding. Discovering that the zombies completely ignore him, he takes advantage of this to fulfill his hedonistic desires and eventually save people.

== Characters ==
Yūsuke Takemura (武村雄介, Takemura Yūsuke)
Voiced by: Wataru Katoh
Mitsuki Fujino (藤野深月, Fujino Mitsuki)
Voiced by: Yuno Azuma
Tokiko Kurose (黒瀬時子, Kurose Tokiko)
Voiced by: Rikako Itō
Sayaka Makiura (牧浦さやか, Makiura Sayaka)
Voiced by: Marie Miyake
Takashi Fujino (藤野隆, Fujino Takashi)
Voiced by: Mitsuki Kuribayashi
Yū Fujino (藤野ゆう, Fujino Yū)
Voiced by: Risae Matsuda
Kiriko Ogura (小倉キリコ, Ogura Kiriko)
Voiced by: Sarah Emi Bridcutt
Kudo (工藤)
Voiced by: Seigo Yokota
Sasaki (佐々木)
Voiced by: Shuhei Matsuda
Onodera (小野寺)
Voiced by: Takeyuki Shimada
Dokuro Otoko (どくろ男; lit. 'Skull Man')
Voiced by: Kentaro Tone

== Media ==
=== Light novel ===
No.	Release date	ISBN
1	February 12, 2016	978-4-86134-860-0
2	August 12, 2016	978-4-86134-901-0
3	March 11, 2017	978-4-86134-986-7

=== Manga ===
A manga adaptation illustrated by Chihiro Masuda began serialization on Frontier Works' Comic Ragchew manga website on June 25, 2021. Its chapters were collected into five tankōbon volumes as of August 2026.

On September 26, 2024, the manga adaptation was added to NTT Solmare's MangaPlaza website and app.

No.	Release date	ISBN
1	March 4, 2022	978-4-86-657524-7
2	January 4, 2023	978-4-86-657628-2
3	February 5, 2024	978-4-86-657736-4
4	April 4, 2025	978-4-86-657849-1
5	August 5, 2026	978-4-86-657956-6

==== Spin-off ====
A spin-off manga illustrated by Robo Kondo, titled In a World Full of Zombies I'm the Only One Who Doesn't Get Attacked: Tokiko If Story (ゾンビのあふれた世界で俺だけが襲われない 時子 IF STORY, Zonbi no Afureta Sekai de Ore Dake ga Osowarenai: Tokiko If Story), began serialization on the same website on October 25, 2025. Its chapters have been collected into a single tankōbon volume as of August 2026.

No.	Release date	ISBN
1	August 5, 2026	978-4-86-657958-0

=== Anime ===
An anime television series adaptation was announced on February 1, 2024. It will be produced by Acca Effe and Frontier Engine and directed by Kazuya Fujishiro, with Yasushi Hirano handling series composition, Kayō Shimoyama and Makuto Okimiru designing the characters, and Isao composing the music. The series was originally scheduled for 2026, but was later delayed due to various circumstances. It is set to premiere on January 2, 2027 on AT-X. (Note: AT-X listed the air dates for the season on Friday at 25:00, which is effectively Saturday at 1:00 JST.) The opening theme song is "No Reaction", performed by RetBear, and the ending theme song is "Moonlight" (月影, Tsukikage), performed by Itsuka Saisei.

== Reception ==
By February 2024, the series had over 380,000 copies in circulation.
