= Dungeon People =

Japanese manga series

- First tankōbon volume cover

ダンジョンの中のひと (Danjon no Naka no Hito)
- Genre: Fantasy
- Manga
- Written by: Sui Futami
- Published by: Futabasha
- English publisher: NA: Seven Seas Entertainment
- Imprint: Action Comics
- Magazine: Web Comic Action
- Original run: June 19, 2020 – present
- Volumes: 7
- Anime television series
- Directed by: Sayaka Yamai
- Written by: Toshimitsu Takeuchi
- Music by: Pieru; LASTorder
- Studio: OLM Team Yoshioka
- Licensed by: Sentai Filmworks: SEA: Tropics Entertainment
- Original network: MBS, TBS, BS-TBS, AT-X, HTB, UX, EBC
- Original run: July 6, 2024 – September 28, 2024
- Episodes: 12
- icon

Dungeon People (Japanese: ダンジョンの中のひと, Hepburn: Danjon no Naka no Hito) is a Japanese manga series written and illustrated by Sui Futami. It has been serialized in Futabasha's Web Comic Action website since June 2020, with its chapters collected in seven tankōbon volumes as of May 2026. An anime television series adaptation produced by OLM aired from July to September 2024.

== Plot ==
A young girl named Clay travels to a dungeon in search for her missing adoptive father, but ends up being hired to work in the dungeon by its owner: a young girl named Belle. During her time there, she learns more about the dungeon's past while continuing to search for clues of her adoptive father's whereabouts.

== Characters ==
Clay (クレイ, Kurei)
Voiced by: Sayaka Senbongi (Japanese); Donna Bella Litton (English)
A thief who went to a dungeon in order to find her adoptive father, who had been missing for three years after entering a dungeon. During the challenge, she accidentally discovered that the dungeon was operated by a powerful young girl named Belle. After losing to Belle, she then accepted her invitation and became her employee to help operate this dungeon.
Belle (ベル, Beru)
Voiced by: Sayumi Suzushiro (Japanese); Annie Wild (English)
The operator of the dungeon and also the boss of the tenth level. Despite resembling a young girl, she has outstanding abilities. Her full name is Beilleheila Langdass (ベーレヘーラー・ラングダス, Bērehērā Rangudasu), though she prefers her nickname.
Rangado (ランガド)
Voiced by: Naomi Kusumi (Japanese); Jay Hickman (English)
A dwarf and an employee of the dungeon. He is responsible for managing the dungeon's treasure chest finances, weapons manufacturing, and on-site construction supervision.
The Old Master (先代, Sendai)
Voiced by: Nobuo Tobita
The previous operator of the dungeon, who passed away prior to the story's events.
Renfringe (レンヒリンジ, Renhirinji)
Voiced by: Hōchū Ōtsuka (Japanese); Kyle C. Jones (English)
The chief of the thieves' guild. He used to be an assassin.
Fūrin (フーリン)
Voiced by: M.A.O (Japanese); Shannon Emerick (English)
The chief assistant of the thieves' guild.
Fen (フェン)
Voiced by: Wataru Katoh (Japanese); Ben McLaughlin (English)
The leader of Ice Wolf's Fang.
Ratta (ラッタ)
Voiced by: Yuki Sakakihara
A member of Ice Wolf's Fang.
Brans (ブランス, Buransu)
Voiced by: Akio Otsuka (Japanese); Jeremy Gee (English)
Clay's adoptive father, who taught Clay many combat skills. He went missing while challenging Belle's dungeon three years ago. His whereabouts still remain unknown.
Shieldmurg, Bandeg, and Bondog
Voiced by: Luis Gallindo (Shieldmurg), Cyrus Rodas (Bandeg), John Hallmark (Bondog) (English)
A trio of goblins that Clay meets in the dungeon. Shieldmurg is a high goblin compared to his brothers.
Kraitze
Voiced by: Akio Otsuka (Japanese); Joe Daniels (English)
One of the monsters who works in the dungeon. He resembles a reaper, but isn't all that intimidating.
Reilmond
Voiced by: David Wald (English)
A large reptilian monster who resides in the dungeon. Despite his intimidating appearance, he is also quite humble.
Parappoparo
A gray dragon who was recently recruited as one of the dungeon's new employees.
Fuuka
A large cat-like monster who was recently recruited as one of the dungeon's new employees. Although he can't move, he possesses powerful skills.
Teruru
A cyclops who was recently recruited as one of the dungeon's new employees. He is also a cook.
Helldande
A monster that resembles a large knight. He was meant to be one of the dungeon's new employees, but was not interested in the job and only wanted the magic gems for his own gain. As a result, Clay and Belle had to kill him.
Lugrant Haim Hasreid
The prince of Frairelvant. He challenged Belle for ownership of the dungeon after he became the new ruler, but lost. He is known to try and dig up information on his opponents.
Hiem
Lugrant's butler.
Lestence
A swordsman who works for Lugrant.
Algred
A warrior who also works for Lugrant.
Kiska
A sorceress who is also one of Lugrant's subordinates.
Pekkomo
Voiced by: Andrew Love (English)
The boss of the ninth floor. He only acts intimidating when fighting adventurers.
Binky
Voiced by: Elissa Cuellar (English)
A cat-like creature who is also one of the dungeon's inhabitants.
Hilkemast
The leader of a gang of murderers.
Buggs
A member of Hilkemast's gang.
Atoto
A member of Hilkemast's gang.
Millielent
An adventurer who joined Hilkemast's group so she can expose their true nature, but fails when they were aware that she was a spy in the first place. She is saved by the dungeon's owners before they can harm her.

== Media ==
=== Manga ===
Written and illustrated by Sui Futami, Dungeon People began serialization in Futabasha's Web Comic Action website on June 19, 2020. The first tankōbon volume was released on February 18, 2021. As of May 2026, seven volumes have been released.

In November 2021, Seven Seas Entertainment announced that it licensed the series for English publication.

==== Volumes ====
No.	Original release date	Original ISBN	English release date	English ISBN
1	February 18, 2021	978-4-575-85547-0	July 19, 2022	978-1-63-858527-5
2	December 16, 2021	978-4-575-85669-9	December 13, 2022	978-1-63-858774-3
3	November 16, 2022	978-4-575-85778-8	December 26, 2023	978-1-68-579513-9
4	August 17, 2023	978-4-575-85876-1	September 17, 2024	979-8-88-843771-1
5	June 20, 2024	978-4-575-85979-9	April 29, 2025	979-8-89-373457-7
6	May 15, 2025	978-4-575-86088-7	February 24, 2026	979-8-89561-671-0
7	May 14, 2026	978-4-575-86209-6	—	—

=== Anime ===
An anime television series adaptation was announced in August 2023. It is produced by OLM and directed by Sayaka Yamai, with Toshimitsu Takeuchi supervising the scripts, Hiroki Nakayama designing the characters, and Pieru and LASTorder composing the music. The series aired from July 6 to September 28, 2024, on the Animeism programming block on MBS, TBS and BS-TBS. (Note: MBS and TBS lists the series premiere on July 5, 2024, at 25:53, which is effectively July 6 at 1:53 a.m. JST.) The opening theme song is "Micro Revolution" (マイクロレボリューション) performed by TrySail, while the ending theme song is "Blueprint" (ブループリント) performed by Akari Nanawo. Sentai Filmworks licensed the series in North America, Australia and British Isles for streaming on Hidive. Tropics Entertainment licensed the series in Southeast Asia for streaming on Tropics Anime Asia YouTube channel.

==== Episodes ====
No.	Title	Directed by	Written by	Storyboarded by	Original release date
1	"A Person in the Dungeon"; Transliteration: "Danjon no Naka ni, Hito" (Japanese: ダンジョンの中に、ひと)	Joji Shimura	Toshimitsu Takeuchi	Sayaka Yamai	July 6, 2024
In a flashback, Clay goes through rough training by her father Brans, who is a skilled warrior. In the present day, Clay now works for a guild for thieves. She journeys her way through a dungeon, which her father has disappeared into years ago. The dungeon has ten floors and no one has ever cleared the seventh floor. The monsters defeated in the dungeon also leave behind small crystals. Clay manages to make it to the ninth floor, but the boss proves to be a strong foe. After accidentally smashing a hole in the wall, the boss's behavior surprisingly changes from being savage to humorous. Behind the wall is a bedroom, and a young girl suddenly enters the room. After the fight is canceled, the girl leads Clay to the area behind the bedroom, revealing a residential area. The girl introduces herself as Beilleheila Langdass and is revealed to be the dungeon's owner. She offers Clay a job in the dungeon, so Clay makes a deal: she will accept if Beilleheila beats her in a match, but will turn it down if she wins. Accepting the challenge, Beilleheila brings her to the tenth room for their battle. However, Beilleheila reveals that she possesses powerful abilities, allowing her to easily defeat Clay. Waking up in the bedroom, which was moved to the extra eleventh floor, Clay is concerned about her job at the thieves' guild, until Beilleheila reveals that the dungeon's original owner also owns the guild. In response, Clay finally accepts Beilleheila's offer.
2	"Starting Work in the Dungeon"; Transliteration: "Danjon no Shigoto Hajime" (Japanese: ダンジョンの仕事始め)	Mayu Numayama	Toshimitsu Takeuchi	Shigeharu Takahashi	July 13, 2024
A flashback, told from Clay's point of view, reveals the dungeon's discovery and how a nearby town was built near it. Clay is given a bedroom to stay in. Beilleheila tells her how the dungeon works and shows her around. Clay is then shown the gems that monsters drop after being killed, and reveals that monsters are cloned and their consciousnesses are transferred into their clone bodies while their real bodies are stored in the gems; should they die, they will return to their original bodies. This motives Clay to become stronger as Beilleheila creates a clone body for her and transfers her consciousness into it as her original body is stored in a gem that is placed inside her clone body. They then meet Rangado, a dwarf who works in the dungeon. Later, Clay helps leave chests for adventurers, though she is reluctant to use stairs, preferring climbing walls. While helping Beilleheila clean the messy control room, she learns that Clay has no friends and offers to be her friend, but she declines.
3	"The Ice Wolf's Fang"; Transliteration: "Hyōrō no Kiba" (Japanese: 氷狼の牙)	Norio Nitta	Toshimitsu Takeuchi	Norio Nitta	July 20, 2024
After the control room is cleaned out, Rangado visits, but isn't used with the cleaned room. Beilleheila shows Clay magic mirrors that show the dungeon's maps and the locations of its inhabitants and adventurers. They discover that a group of adventurers called Ice Wolf's Fang, who once harassed Clay in the past, are in the dungeon. Beilleheila decides to have Clay face them and contacts Kraitze, a reaper-like being who serves as one of the dungeon's inhabitants, requesting to borrow one of his skeleton minions. She transfers Clay's consciousness into that skeleton's body. During their confrontation with Ice Wolf's Fang, Clay manages to overpower them, forcing the adventurers to retreat. Clay is returned to her body afterwards. Having grown tried of people calling her by her full name due to how complicated it is to pronounce it, Beilleheila decides to nickname herself Belle. Clay is disappointed that there isn't much work at the moment.
4	"The Thieves' Guild and the Dungeon"; Transliteration: "Sīfu Girudo to Danjon" (Japanese: シーフギルドとダンジョン)	Nozomi Ishii	Toshimitsu Takeuchi	Takeshi Mori	July 27, 2024 (Note: This episode aired at 2:03 a.m. JST, 10 minutes after the original air time)
A flashback shows the disappearance of a thieves' guild in a kingdom called Frairelvant. In the present, Clay and Belle visit the guild that Clay works at via magical teleporter in the basement to make a delivery. They meet the guildmasters: Renfringe and Furin, who are in league with Belle. It is revealed that Belle and her master were the ones responsible for the disappearance of Frairelvant's guild due to them sending assassins to the dungeon. Renfringe reveals that he was originally an assassin, and tells Clay that he didn't see Brans leave the dungeon, hinting that he is still inside. Clay and Belle return to the dungeon to fix some magical bags requested by the guildmasters. Clay learns that her dagger came from the dungeon's tenth floor, revealing that Brans did reach the tenth floor after all. Belle introduces her to the dungeon's other inhabitants and shows her an arena for training, which has a glass wall that prevents outside interference. The three goblins that Clay previously defeated request for a rematch against her. She agrees as Belle explains that when entering the arena, competitors' consciousnesses will be interested into a digital copy of their bodies. In the arena, Clay wins the fight against the goblins, but now has to face a large dinosaur-like monster.
5	"Coworkers, Family"; Transliteration: "Shigoto Nakama, Kazoku" (Japanese: 仕事仲間、家族)	Mayu Numayama	Masanao Akahoshi	Shigeharu Takahashi	August 10, 2024 (Note: Episode 5 was delayed for one week due to broadcasting of the 2024 Summer Olympics) (Note: This episode aired at 2:23 a.m. JST, 30 minutes after the original air time)
The monster humbly introduces himself as Reilmond and requests a fight too. The fight ends in a draw, but the two decide to play fair and end the match. Later in the control room, Clay learns that even though she isn't doing anything right now, she is still working regardless. She is asked to make treasure for the dungeon and help Rangado expand it. Rangado also tells her about the old master, Belle's mentor, as well as Belle's past. This leads Clay to question Belle about Rangado.
6	"Exploration and Cooking"; Transliteration: "Tansaku to Ryōri" (Japanese: 探索と料理)	Yūma Imura	Toshimitsu Takeuchi	Takeshi Mori	August 17, 2024
During a meal, Belle and Clay reveal that their ways of eating are different from each others. Rangado comes to help, but his way of cooking is also different. After the meal is cooked, Rangado isn't satisfied, so Clay and Belle ask Furin to teach them how to properly cook. They go through several lessons and manage to create perfect meals for them to enjoy. Belle rewards Furin with dragon meat to thank her for her help, but this experience leaves Clay wondering. Later, Clay examines a dagger that Rangado made. He also provides Clay with a revealing armor, which was long requested by the old master. Clay also wishes to continue exploring the dungeon, and Belle reluctantly agrees despite warning her of what will happen if her clone body dies. During her exploration, she defeats a humanoid flame monster. After finding a chest, she recalls how some chests are fatal traps, but upon opening it, it is anything but dangerous. She then defeats a plant spirit and a metal golem, but grows worried about the obstacles getting harder. As a result, she heads back to the control room and reunites with Belle.
7	"Monster Job Interview"; Transliteration: "Monsutā no Mensetsu" (Japanese: モンスターの面接)	Norio Nitta	Masanao Akahoshi	Norio Nitta	August 24, 2024
Fen, Ice Wolf's Fang's leader, grows fearful of the skeleton (who is actually Clay) that he lost to in the dungeon. Meanwhile, Belle decides to interview some monsters from the demon world who are hired to work in the dungeon and has Clay join her. They head to the tenth floor where an interview area is set up. A summon circle is created to call up monsters. The first to appear is a dragon named Parappoparo, the second is a cat-like monster named Fuuka, and the third is a cyclops named Teruru. Clay questions Belle about the magic gems that Teruru mentioned as well as the demon world, leading Clay to wonder about herself. The next newcomer is a knight-like monster named Helldande, who greedily wants the magic gems for himself, so Clay decides to challenge him. Belle sees how much Clay has improved. Clay wins the fight and Belle helps kill him. After Clay wonders about her father, they proceed to carry the body away. Meanwhile, Ice Wolf's Fang have returned to the dungeon, where they face Fuuka.
8	"Remodeling and Employment"; Transliteration: "Moyōgae to Koyō" (Japanese: 模様替えと雇用)	Nozomi Ishii	Toshimitsu Takeuchi	Hiroyuki Fukushima	August 31, 2024
Ice Wolf's Fang managed to defeat Fuuka, though with some difficulties, but they still choose to press on. Meanwhile, Belle plans to remodel the dungeon and has Clay help out with the changes. She then gives out ideas on the traps and monsters, to which Belle also tasks her with redesigning the fifth floor. She and Clay then travel to the dungeon's core, which has a door that will only open for Belle. Once inside, Clay is bothered by the spirits living here, but Belle stops them. After Belle finishes writing the modifications, she adds it to the dungeon's settings, changing the floors. They then return to Rangado, who then proceeds to help finish the remodeling. Belle shows Clay the source slime, which serves as the source of life for all slimes in the dungeon, while also telling Clay more about slimes. The inhabitants are later assigned to different posts of the new floor. Meanwhile, Ice Wolf's Fang are waiting for a battle to finish in the room up ahead so they can advance.
9	"King and Dungeon Master"; Transliteration: "Kokuō to Danjon Masutā" (Japanese: 国王とダンジョンマスター)	Joji Shimura	Masanao Akahoshi	Joji Shimura	September 7, 2024
Clay tells the story of a young prince who now rules Frairelvant while visiting the kingdom. Upon returning, she finds Belle in a shrine maiden-like outfit. She explains that the true reason why Frairelvant was built in the first place is to gain control of the dungeon and its riches, but this angered the old master, who made the kingdom's guild disappear in retaliation. Whenever Frairelvant has a new ruler, they get to challenge the dungeon master and the winner gains full ownership of the dungeon, but the match must take place in the kingdom as Belle is the only one who can use teleportation magic. Clay is asked to accompany her and is given a maid's outfit to wear. Arriving at the kingdom, they meet Heim, the castle butler, who escorts them to the arena where the fight will take place. They then meet Lugrant Haim Hasreid, the kingdom's prince, and his subjects Lestence, Algred, and Kiska. As the fight begins, Belle has the upper handle against Lugrant's subordinates, but the prince, having planned ahead, attempts to force Belle to surrender by having Hiem take Clay hostage, but this fails when Clay overpowers Heim instead. As a result, Lugrant sees that he can't win and decides to admit defeat. He then asks Clay for her name, but she uses Rangado's name as an alias to throw him off track, knowing that he intends to dig up dirt on her. After returning to the dungeon, Belle discovers that the guild is looking for Rangado on Lugrant's orders, making them wonder how to resolve the situation.
10	"The Wind Slicer's Daughter"; Transliteration: "Kazakiri no Musume" (Japanese: 風切りの娘)	Mayu Numayama	Toshimitsu Takeuchi	Tomoko Akiyama	September 14, 2024
Clay recalls how she was orphaned and was adopted by Brans. After talking to Belle about her lifestyle, Clay decides to spend some time with the monsters in hopes of learning more about Brans' whereabouts. She meets Pekkomo, the boss of the ninth floor, and a cat-like monster named Binky, who tells her more about Brans, whom they refer to as the "Wind Slicer". She and Belle later visit an outdoor-like area containing a goblin village and that the goblins here are being produced in a similar manner to how plants grow and that should any goblins die, they are reborn in the village.
11	"Those Who are Not Protected"; Transliteration: "Mamoranu Monotachi" (Japanese: 守らぬ者たち)	Norio Nitta	Masanao Akahoshi	Norio Nitta	September 21, 2024
Fen learns of a group of murderers (consisting of Hilkemast, Buggs, and Atoto) who have entered the kingdom, but they pretend to be nice in public to hide who they really are. A female adventurer named Millielent joins the murderers with the intent to spy on them so to reveal the true colors. They later head to the dungeon. Meanwhile, the guild learns of the murderers' presence and the news is delivered to Belle. She and Clay prepare to face the murderers. Millielent is then betrayed by the murderers, who had known that she was a spy in the first place, but she is saved by Rangado's golems. They are forced to retreat while the golem's pursue them, leaving Millielent alone. Belle brings them to the tenth floor where she and Clay challenge them. Clay kills Buggs while Atoto flees out of fear. Hilkemast attempts to trick Belle into letting her guard down by pretending to propose a truce, but she does not fall for it, revealing that the thieves' guild is their ally, and kills him before doing the same to Atoto. Meanwhile, Millielent encounters the Ice Wolf's Fang, but cries out in relief that they have no negative comments.
12	"Dungeon People"; Transliteration: "Danjon no Naka no Hito" (Japanese: ダンジョンの中のひと)	Nozomi Ishii	Toshimitsu Takeuchi	Norio Nitta & Akiko Nagashima	September 28, 2024
After finishing a meal, Belle invites Clay to an area that resembles a large open field. They meet Pekkomo, Binky, and Reilmond again. They also visit a large kitchen where Teruru works. Noticing something off with Clay, they head to the same crystal that was used to create Clay's clone body. It turns out the crystal's power cannot last long and has to be replaced every now and then. After putting a new crystal in and transferring the data from the old crystal to the new one, Clay carries the old crystal as Belle escorts her to the dungeon's core, which functions like a heart and a brain. As Belle attempts to recharge the crystal so it can be reused, it shatters, but Belle isn't too upset as she had broken several of them in the past. After the process is finished, they return to the open field to watch the sunset. Clay then begins to find comfort in Belle as they head back inside for dinner.

== Reception ==
The manga was one of 50 nominees for the 2021 Next Manga Awards in the digital category. In 2024, the series, alongside Oblivion Battery, won the Grand Prize in the "I Want to Read it Now" category of the 2nd Rakuten Kobo E-book Awards.

Anime News Network (ANN) had four editors review the first episode of the anime: Richard Eisenbeis found it "competent in all areas" of story and visuals but wasn't pulled in by the humor, the main character's quest or the bureaucracy workplace setting. While finding the contrast of "blood and dismemberment" with the "cutesy art style" and Clay's cerebral fighting strategy memorable, he concluded that: "Still, in the end, it's safe to say that this one isn't for me. It's not bad. It just doesn't catch my interest." Rebecca Silverman wrote that: "The art and animation aren't great (though I am a sucker for limited use of color, like we see in the beginning), but the delivery seems like it may be more important to the humor for this one. I'm willing to give it a second episode to see how it plays out." Nicholas Dupree was baffled by Clay's story being told seriously with "multiple high-stakes battles" and "bloody violence", and felt out of place with the "soft and cuddly" aesthetic meant for a "low-stakes comedy". He critiqued that the setup could have been better as Clay learned about the logistics of the various dungeons, concluding that: "Perhaps episode two will do some of that, but I doubt I'll stick around to find out. First impressions are important, and nothing in this premiere impressed me enough to want to continue." The fourth reviewer, James Beckett, commended the "lively and consistent" animation and the character traits of both Clay and Belle, but was critical of the "generally unambitious presentation" and a couple of dark tonal beats interrupting the comedic story structure, saying: "It's a perfectly okay first episode, but I'm not convinced that Dungeon People is one of the anime you absolutely have to keep up with this summer."

Fellow ANN editor Kevin Cormack reviewed the complete anime series and gave it a B+ grade. He praised Belle and Clay's comedic friendship and the "super-cute, simple character designs," but was critical of the slow pacing and the "occasional unexpectedly dark subject matter" disrupting the relaxed vibes of viewers, concluding that: "Dungeon People is a cute, cozy mash-up of the fantasy and workplace comedy genres that mostly succeeds at what it sets out to do. While not as relentlessly creative or compelling as this year's earlier Delicious in Dungeon, Dungeon People maintains a pleasant, gently entertaining vibe of its own, with plenty of fun ideas to explore."
