= Kensho Ono =

Japanese voice actor

- 小野 賢章
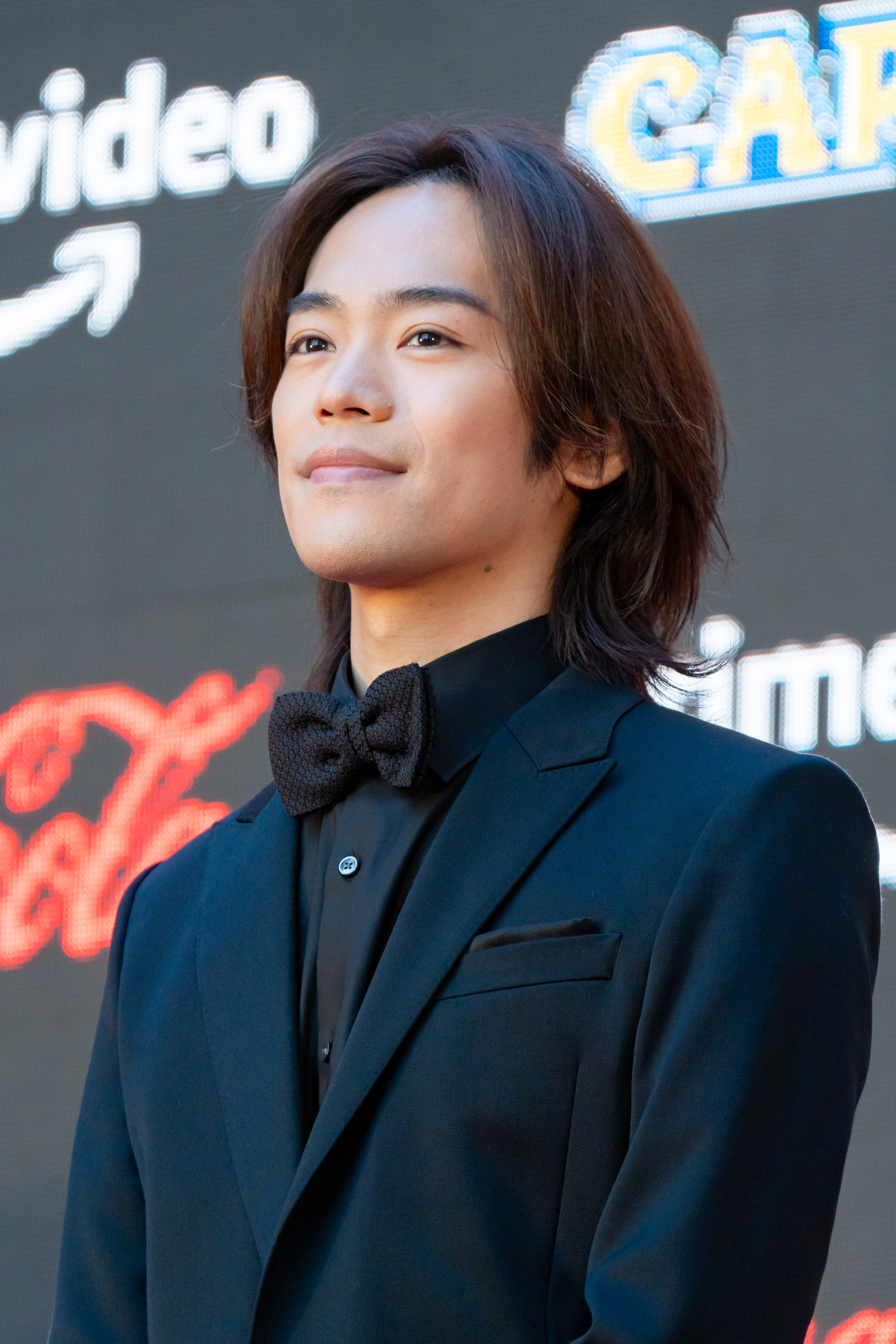
- Ono at the Tokyo International Film Festival in 2023
- Born: October 5, 1989 (age 37); Fukuoka, Fukuoka Prefecture, Japan
- Occupations: Actor; voice actor; singer
- Years active: 1993–present
- Agent: Animo Produce
- Height: 170 cm (5 ft 7 in)
- Spouse: Kana Hanazawa (m. 2020; div. 2025)
- Musical career
- Genre: J-pop
- Instrument: Vocals
- Years active: 2014–present
- Label: Lantis

Kensho Ono (小野 賢章, Ono Kenshō; born October 5, 1989) is a Japanese actor and singer. His most well-known characters are Tetsuya Kuroko, the titular protagonist in the anime series Kuroko's Basketball, Riku Nanase in Idolish7, Ryuunosuke Akutagawa in Bungo Stray Dogs, Giorno Giovanna in JoJo's Bizarre Adventure, Slaine Troyard in Aldnoah.Zero, Yuya Sakaki in Yu-Gi-Oh! Arc-V, Hakuryu Ren in Magi: The Labyrinth of Magic, and Mikaela Hyakuya in Seraph of the End. He is also known as the Japanese dub voice of Harry Potter in the Harry Potter film series, and Miles Morales in Spider-Man: Into the Spider-Verse and Spider-Man: Across the Spider-Verse. He also plays Muromachi Tōji in the Prince of Tennis musical.

== Career ==
Ono became a voice actor and starred in Toshiie to Matsu.

In February 2014, he launched a singing career with the single "Fantastic Tune". Since then, he has released four singles, two mini albums, and one full album. His fifth solo single "Five Star" was released through Lantis on June 27, 2018, after which he announced a summer tour titled 'Ono Kensho Live Tour 2018'.

Ono was previously represented by Sunaoka Office, a subsidiary of Gekidan Himawari; however, he is now represented by Amino Produce. He has also appeared in various anime and Japanese TV drama series. His 1st television Show was Fafner in the Azure: Dead Aggressor (2004).

In 2022, Ono won the Best Lead Actor Award at the 16th Seiyu Awards.

== Personal life ==
In February 2017, Ono and Kana Hanazawa confirmed that they were dating during a live stream promoting Hanazawa's album release, after Shūkan Bunshun published allegations about their relationship. On July 8, 2020, they announced that they had registered their marriage. On September 14, 2025, Ono and Hanazawa announced their divorce on their social media accounts, citing different lifestyles and being unable to spend time together as their reasons.

== Filmography ==
=== Films ===
- Shōnen H (2013) – Icchan
- Hōtai Club (2007)
- Dive!! (2008)
- ReLIFE (2017)

=== Dramas ===
- Taiga drama: Toshiie and Matsu (2002) – Maeda Magoshirō (Eps. 15–17)
- Taiga drama: Fūrin Kazan (2007) – Yoriyuki Suwa (Eps. 14–15)
- Ballad of a Shinigami – Maruyama
- Iwo Jima – Iwao Yamada
- Detective School Q – Junya Kameda (Eps. 4–5)
- Hakata Stay Hungry – Japanese: 博多ステイハングリ
- Fujoshi, Ukkari Gay ni Kokuru (2019) – Mr. Fahrenheit (voice)

=== Anime series ===
2006

- Tsubasa Chronicle – Chaos

2007

- Moribito: Guardian of the Spirit – Yāsamu
- Shinreigari/Ghost Hound – Komori Taro

2008

- Monochrome Factor – George
- Pocket Monsters: Diamond & Pearl – Ryō

2009

- Michiko to Hatchin – Lenine

2012

- Kuroko's Basketball – Kuroko Tetsuya
- Magi: The Labyrinth of Magic – Ren Hakuryuu

2013

- Gingitsune – Satoru Kamio
- Kuroko's Basketball 2 – Kuroko Tetsuya
- Magi: The Kingdom of Magic – Ren Hakuryuu
- Makai Ouji: Devils and Realist – Leonard

2014

- Ace of Diamond – Todoroki Raichi
- Aldnoah.Zero – Troyard Slaine
- Bakumatsu Rock – Okita Sōji
- Pokémon XY: Mega Evolution – Alain
- Shounen Hollywood: Holly Stage for 49 – Maiyama Shun
- Yu-Gi-Oh! ARC-V – Yuya Sakaki, Yuri

2015

- Ace of Diamond second season – Todoroki Raichi
- Aldnoah.Zero second season – Slaine Troyard
- Charlotte – Takato
- Fafner in the Azure: EXODUS – Kaburagi Sui
- Ghost in the Shell: Arise – Alternative Architecture – Vrinda Jr.
- Gintama – Kurokono Tasuke
- Kuroko's Basketball 3 – Tetsuya Kuroko
- Maria the Virgin Witch – Joseph
- Pokémon XY – Alan (Alain)
- Seraph of the End – Mikaela Hyakuya
- Star-Myu: High School Star Musical – Toru Nayuki
- Samurai Warriors – Toyotomi Hideyori
- Q Transformers: Return of the Mystery of Convoy – Hot Rod
- Q Transformers: Saranaru Ninki Mono e no Michi – Hot Rod
- Yu-Gi-Oh! ARC-V – Yuya Sakaki, Yuri

2016

- All Out!! – Ōharano Etsugo
- Bungo Stray Dogs – Ryūnosuke Akutagawa
- Bungo Stray Dogs 2 – Ryūnosuke Akutagawa
- Endride – Asanaga Shun
- Luck & Logic – Tsurugi Yoshichika
- Momokuri – Seichiro Usami
- Pocket Monsters: XY&Z – Alain
- Prince of Stride Alternative – Kohinata Hozumi
- ReLIFE – Arata Kaizaki
- Tanaka-kun Is Always Listless – Tanaka
- Tsukiuta. The Animation – Kanazuki Iku
- Www.Working!! – Shindo Yuta
- Yu-Gi-Oh! ARC-V – Yuya Sakaki, Yuri, Zarc
- Yuri!!! on Ice – Phichit Chulanont

2017

- Akashic Records of Bastard Magic Instructor – Kleitos Leos
- Boruto: Naruto Next Generations – Shikadai Nara, Akuta
- Ikemen Sengoku: Toki o Kakeru ga Koi wa Hajimaranai – Sanada Yukimura
- Love Tyrant – Seiji Aino
- Rage of Bahamut: Virgin Soul – Visponti Alessand
- Star-Myu: High School Star Musical 2 – Toru Nayuki
- Tsuredure Children – Akagi Masafumi

2018

- Aikatsu Friends! – Maito Chono
- Attack on Titan Third Season – Floch Forster
- Hakata Tonkotsu Ramens – Enokida
- Hakyū Hōshin Engi – Taikobo
- Idolish7 – Nanase Riku
- JoJo's Bizarre Adventure: Golden Wind – Giorno Giovanna/Gold Experience/Gold Experience Requiem
- RErideD: Derrida, who leaps through time – Yvain Derrida
- Zoku Touken Ranbu: Hanamaru – Monoyoshi Sadamune
- Tsurune – Shū Fujiwara
- Zoids Wild – Arashi

2019

- Ace of Diamond Act II – Todoroki Raichi
- Babylon – Atsuhiko Fumio
- BEM – Belo
- Beyblade Burst GT – Delta Akane
- Bungo Stray Dogs 3 – Ryūnosuke Akutagawa
- Business Fish – Ika
- Fairy Tail – Larcade Dragneel
- My Roommate Is a Cat – Mikazuki Subaru
- Radiant – Diabal
- Star-Myu: High School Star Musical 3 – Toru Nayuki
- Vinland Saga – Canute

2020

- Bofuri – Payne
- Idolish7: Second Beat! – Nanase Riku
- Ikebukuro West Gate Park – Kurō
- The Gymnastics Samurai – Leonardo
- Tsukiuta. The Animation 2 – Kanazuki Iku
- Uchitama?! Have you seen my Tama? – Pochi Yamada
- Woodpecker Detective's Office – Taro Hirai

2021

- 2.43: Seiin High School Boys Volleyball Team – Kimichika Haijima
- Attack on Titan: The Final Season – Floch Forster
- Back Arrow – Bit Namital
- Bungo Stray Dogs Wan! – Ryūnosuke Akutagawa
- Cestvs: The Roman Fighter – Ruska
- Dr. Stone: Stone Wars – Ukyō Saionji
- Idolish7: Third Beat! – Nanase Riku
- Komi Can't Communicate – Mono Shinobino
- My Hero Academia Season 5 – Oboro Shirakumo
- Night Head 2041 – Yūya Kuroki
- SK8 the Infinity – Tadashi Kikuchi
- Vivy: Fluorite Eye's Song – Tatsuya Saeki

2022

- Aoashi – Taira Nakamura
- Call of the Night – Mahiru Seki
- Fantasia Sango – Realm of Legends – Ōki
- I'm Quitting Heroing – Leo Demonheart
- Komi Can't Communicate 2nd Season – Mono Shinobino
- Love All Play – Taichi Higashiyama
- Shadows House 2nd Season – Christopher/Anthony
- Spy × Family – Yuri Briar
- Summer Time Rendering – Sō Hishigata
- Tiger & Bunny 2nd Season – Mugan
- Tomodachi Game – Kei Shinomiya
- Tribe Nine – Eiji Todoroki

2023

- Bofuri 2nd Season – Payne
- Bungo Stray Dogs 5 – Ryūnosuke Akutagawa
- Dog Signal – Miyu Samura
- Hell's Paradise: Jigokuraku – Tōma Yamada Asaemon
- Paradox Live – Kuzuryu Chisei
- Protocol: Rain – Shun Tokinoya
- The Legendary Hero Is Dead! – Friedrich Norstein
- Tsurune: The Linking Shot – Shū Fujiwara
- Vinland Saga Season 2 – Canute

2024

- Atri: My Dear Moments – Natsuki Ikaruga
- Blue Box – Shūji Yusa
- Blue Lock vs. U-20 Japan – Haru Hayate
- Blue Miburo – Sōji Okita
- Go! Go! Loser Ranger! – Yellow Keeper
- Kinnikuman: Perfect Origin Arc – Geronimo
- Let This Grieving Soul Retire! – Krai Andrey
- Shinkalion: Change the World – Akane Forden
- The Healer Who Was Banished From His Party, Is, in Fact, the Strongest – Raust
- The New Gate – Shin

2025

- Ameku M.D.: Doctor Detective – Yu Takanashi
- Araiguma Calcal-dan – Subcal
- Captivated, by You – Miyoshi Hayashi
- Gag Manga Biyori GO – Chupacabra
- Hero Without a Class: Who Even Needs Skills?! – Allele
- I Have a Crush at Work – Seiya Suzuki
- Ishura Season 2 – Rosclay the Absolute
- Lazarus – Schneider
- Li'l Miss Vampire Can't Suck Right – Tatsuta Ōtori
- Your Forma – Harold W. Lucraft

2026

- Daemons of the Shadow Realm – Yuru
- Dark Machine: The Animation – Kairi
- Full Clearing Another World Under a Goddess with Zero Believers – Ryōsuke Sakurai
- Hikuidori – Kaji Seijuro
- In the Clear Moonlit Dusk – Takuto Ohji
- My Hero Academia: Vigilantes Season 2 – Oboro Shirakumo
- Nippon Sangoku – Aoteru Misumi
- Please Excuse My Younger Brothers – Syu Narita

TBA

- The Boxer – Ryu

=== Original net animation ===
- Momokuri (2015) – Seiichiro Usami
- 7 Seeds (2019) – Ango
- Japan Sinks: 2020 (2020) – Kaito
- Hanma Baki – Son of Ogre (2021) – Chamomile Lessen
- Gundam Breaker Battlogue (2021) – Ryūsei Fudо̄
- Bastard!! -Heavy Metal, Dark Fantasy- (2022) – Kall-Su
- Dandelion (2026) – Yūichi Kyōkawa

=== Original video animation ===
- Beyond (The Animatrix) (2003) – Manabu
- Submarine 707R (2003) – Kenji Manahaya
- Coicent (2011) – Kakimono, Shinichi
- Ghost in the Shell: Arise (2014) – Vrinda, Jr.
- Mobile Suit Gundam: The Origin (2017) – Yuki Snow
- Hi Score Girl: Extra Stage (2019) – Sasquatch Tamagawagakuenmae

=== Anime films ===
- Legend of the Millennium Dragon (2011) – Tendo Jun
- Saint Seiya: Legend of Sanctuary (2014) – Cygnus Hyōga
- Boruto: Naruto the Movie (2015) – Shikadai Nara
- A Silent Voice (2016) – Nagatsuka Tomohiro
- Kuroko's Basketball The Movie: Last Game (2017) – Kuroko Tetsuya
- Pretty Cure Super Stars (2018) – Clover
- Bungo Stray Dogs: Dead Apple (2018) – Ryūnosuke Akutagawa
- A Whisker Away (2020) – Masamichi Isami
- BEM: Become Human (2020) – Belo
- Mobile Suit Gundam: Hathaway (2021) – Hathaway Noa/Mafty Navue Erin
- The Orbital Children (2022) – Taiyō Tsukuba
- Rakudai Majo: Fūka to Yami no Majo (2023) – Keith
- Komada: A Whisky Family (2023) – Kōtarō Takahashi
- My Next Life as a Villainess: All Routes Lead to Doom! The Movie (2023) – Aaqil
- My Oni Girl (2024) – Hiiragi Yatsuse
- The Rose of Versailles (2025) – Maximilien Robespierre
- Undead Unluck Winter Arc (2025) – Tella
- Tatsuki Fujimoto Before Chainsaw Man (2025) – Yūto
- Mobile Suit Gundam: Hathaway – The Sorcery of Nymph Circe (2026) – Hathaway Noa/Mafty Navue Erin
- Paris ni Saku Étoile (2026) – Kouzou Tsuguta
- Doraemon: Nobita's Steam-Powered Time Machine (2027) – Doug

=== Video games ===
- Winnie the Pooh: Pre School (1999) – Christopher Robin
- Eureka Seven Vol.1: New Wave (2005) – Natabachi's brother
- Shinreigari/Ghost Hound DS (2008) – Tarō Kōmori
- Sky Crawlers: Innocent Aces (2008) – Kō Ukumori
- Dissidia 012 Final Fantasy (2011) – Vaan
- Granblue Fantasy (2013) – Ayer, Baal
- Photograph Journey (2014) – Kohiyama Yūto
- Silent Scope: Bone-Eater (2014) - Jin Arkwright
- Tokyo Ghoul: Jail (2015) – Rio
- Yu-Gi-Oh-ARC-V Tag Force Special (2015) – Sakaki Yuya
- Idolish7 (2015) – Nanase Riku
- Touken Ranbu (2015) – Monoyoshi Sadamune (物吉貞宗)
- Prince of Stride (2015) – Hozumi Kohinata
- Ikémen Sengoku: Romances Across Time (2015) – Sanada Yukimura
- Dissidia Final Fantasy NT (2015) – Vaan
- Final Fantasy Explorers (2016) – Vaan
- Dissidia Final Fantasy Opera Omnia (2017) – Vaan
- Food Fantasy (2018) – B-52, Napoleon Cake, Brownie
- Final Fantasy Brave Exvius: War of the Visions (2019) – Mont Leonis
- Saint Seiya Awakening (2019) – Wolf Nachi
- JoJo's Bizarre Adventure: Last Survivor (2019) – Giorno Giovanna
- Genshin Impact (2020) – Diluc Ragnvindr
- Helios Rising Heroes (2020) – Marion Blythe
- Jump Force (2020) – Giorno Giovanna (DLC)
- Blaster Master Zero Trilogy: Metafight Chronicle (2021) – Jason Frudnick
- Cookie Run: Kingdom (2021) – Knight Cookie
- Yu-Gi-Oh! Duel Links (2021) – Yuya Sakaki
- Arknights (2022) – Enforcer
- Gunvolt Chronicles: Luminous Avenger iX 2 (2022) – Jason Frudnick
- JoJo's Bizarre Adventure: All Star Battle R (2022) – Giorno Giovanna
- Triangle Strategy (2022) – Serenoa Wolffort
- Metaphor: ReFantazio (2024) – Leon Strohl da Haliaetus
- The Hundred Line: Last Defense Academy (2025) – Gaku Maruko

=== Radio dramas ===
- Samurai Shodown: Warriors Rage (Radio Drama) – Seishiro Kuki
- Kuroko's Basketball – Kuroko Tetsuya

=== Drama CD ===
- Tsukiuta – Kannadzuki Iku
- Ikemen Sengoku: Romances Across Time – Sanada Yukimura
- Paradox Live – Chisei Kuzuryu
- Fantastic Night – Tenma Hino

=== Dubbing ===
==== Live-action ====
- Daniel Radcliffe
  - Harry Potter series – Harry Potter
  - December Boys – Maps
  - The Woman in Black – Arthur Kipps
  - A Young Doctor's Notebook – Young Doctor
  - Kill Your Darlings – Allen Ginsberg
  - Horns – Ignatius "Ig" Perrish
  - Victor Frankenstein – Igor Straussman
  - Now You See Me 2 – Walter Mabry
  - Swiss Army Man – Manny
  - Guns Akimbo – Miles Lee Harris
  - The Lost City – Abigail Fairfax
- Dessau Dancers – Frank (Gordon Kämmerer)
- Dragonheart: Battle for the Heartfire – Edric (Tom Rhys Harries)
- Dunkirk – Tommy (Fionn Whitehead)
- Free Guy – Keys (Joe Keery)
- Jeepers Creepers 2 – Billy Taggart (Shaun Fleming)
- Jurassic World: Fallen Kingdom (2025 The Cinema edition) – Franklin Webb (Justice Smith)
- Maleficent: Mistress of Evil – Prince Phillip (Harris Dickinson)
- Max Keeble's Big Move – Max Keeble (Alex D. Linz)
- Me and Earl and the Dying Girl – Greg Gaines (Thomas Mann)
- Molly's Game – Player X (Michael Cera)
- Mulan – Cricket (Jun Yu)
- Mystic River – Young Dave Boyle (Cameron Bowen)
- The Nutcracker and the Four Realms – Captain Philip Hoffman (Jayden Fowora-Knight)
- Pearl Harbor – Young Rafe McCawley (Jesse James)
- The Pillars of the Earth – Eustace (Douglas Booth)
- Seabiscuit – Young Red Pollard (Michael Angarano)
- West Side Story – Riff (Mike Faist)

==== Animation ====
- All Saints Street – Evan
- The Cuphead Show! – Mugman
- Return to Never Land – Slightly
- Spider-Man: Into the Spider-Verse – Miles Morales / Spider-Man
- Spider-Man: Across the Spider-Verse – Miles Morales / Spider-Man
- Toy Story 3 – Andy Davis

==== Theater ====
2001

- Elisabeth – Young Rudolf
- The Lion King – Young Simba

2003

- Sans Famille– Capi

2004

- Sans Famille – Capi

2005

- The Secret Garden – Dickon

2006

- Sans Famille – Capi

2008

- Night on the Galactic Railroad

2009

- Love on the planet〜
- Break Through! (パッチギ! Pacchigi!)
- Banana Fish

2011

- Musical Prince of Tennis – second season – Muromachi
- Switching On Summer-

2012

- Musical Prince of Tennis – second season – Muromachi
- Hybrid Project Vol.6 FLYING PANCAKE

2014

- Musical Prince of Tennis – second season – Muromachi

2016

- Kuroko no Basuke Stage – Kuroko Tetsuya 8–24 April

2026

- Harry Potter and the Cursed Child – Harry Potter

== Photobook ==
- Kensho was released on 10 January 2015.

== Discography ==
=== Studio albums ===
List of studio albums, with selected chart positions, sales figures and certifications
Title	Year	Album details	Peak chart positions	Sales
Title	Year	Album details	JPN	Sales
Take the Top	2018	Released: February 26, 2018; Label: Lantis; Formats: CD, digital download; Track listing: 1. "Take the Top"; 2. "Touch"; 3. "Night Drivin'"; 4. "Rain Dance"; 5. "Wonder Train"; 6. "Against The Wind"; 7. "Story"; 8. "Zero"; 9. "To You"; 10. "Fantastic Tune"	57	—
"—" denotes releases that did not chart or were not released in that region.

=== Extended plays ===
List of extended plays, with selected chart positions, sales figures and certifications
Title	Year	Album details	Peak chart positions	Sales
Title	Year	Album details	JPN	Sales
Touch the Style	2014	Released: June 25, 2014; Label: Lantis; Formats: CD, digital download; Track listing: 1. "Touch"; 2. "Needless to Say"; 3. "Phase"; 4. "Blue Horizon"; 5. "On the Road"; 6. "One Of Pieces"	37	—
Colors	2016	Released: March 23, 2016; Label: Lantis; Formats: CD, digital download; Track listing: 1. "Night Drivin'"; 2. "Roll Up"; 3. "Feel So Nice!!"; 4. "Going Home"; 5. "Snow Light"; 6. "Be With You"	45	—
"—" denotes releases that did not chart or were not released in that region.

=== Singles ===
List of singles, with selected chart positions, sales figures and certifications
Title	Year	Peak chart positions			Sales	Album
Title	Year	JPN	JPN Hot	JPN Ani.	Sales	Album
"Fantastic Tune"	2014	13	32	2	JPN: 8,730	Take the Top
"Zero"	2015	18	42	7	JPN: 3,538	Take the Top
"Story"	2016	45	—	—	—	Take the Top
"Against The Wind"	2017	31	—	—	—	Take the Top
"Five Star"	2018	88	—	—	—	Non-album single
"—" denotes releases that did not chart or were not released in that region.
