= Aoashi =

Japanese manga series

- First tankōbon volume cover, featuring Ashito Aoi

アオアシ
- Genre: Sports
- Manga
- Written by: Yūgo Kobayashi; Naohiko Ueno
- Illustrated by: Yūgo Kobayashi
- Published by: Shogakukan
- English publisher: NA: Titan Publishing Group; SG: Shogakukan Asia; UK: Titan Publishing Group
- Magazine: Weekly Big Comic Spirits
- Original run: January 5, 2015 – June 23, 2025
- Volumes: 40
- Manga

Aoashi Brotherfoot
- Written by: Yūgo Kobayashi
- Published by: Shogakukan
- Magazine: Big Comic Spirits
- Original run: July 12, 2021 – present
- Volumes: 2
- Anime television series
- Directed by: Akira Satō (S1); Kazuki Yokoyama (S2)
- Written by: Masahiro Yokotani
- Music by: Masaru Yokoyama
- Studio: Production I.G (S1); TMS Entertainment (S2)
- Licensed by: Crunchyroll (streaming); SEA: Disney Platform Distribution (S1); SEA: Medialink (S2)
- Original network: NHK Educational TV
- Original run: April 9, 2022 – present
- Episodes: 31
- icon

Aoashi (Note: The title refers to main character's name Aoi Ashito (in Japanese order). Ao means 'blue', which is the color of Japan national football team, while ashi means 'feet'. Ao (青) also comes from ("青春"; lit. 'youth', 'blue spring'). The title also means 'blue reed', which represents immaturity.) (アオアシ) is a Japanese manga series written and illustrated by Yūgo Kobayashi and based on a concept by Naohiko Ueno. It was serialized in Shogakukan's seinen manga magazine Weekly Big Comic Spirits from January 2015 to June 2025, with its chapters collected in 40 tankōbon volumes. The series involves youth football player Ashito Aoi and his journey and experiences in the Tokyo Esperion youth academy.

An anime television series adaptation produced by Production I.G aired from April to September 2022. A second season produced by TMS Entertainment premiered in October 2026.

By August 2026, the manga had over 26 million copies in circulation. In 2020, the manga won the 65th Shogakukan Manga Award for the general category.

== Synopsis ==
Aoashi tells the story of young Ashito Aoi in his third year at Ehime City Middle School and his meeting with football coach Tatsuya Fukuda. Ashito, although talented, is a difficult boy, but Fukuda believes in him and invites him to join his own team. Ashito could well change the face of Japanese football.

== Characters ==
=== Tokyo Esperion ===
Ashito Aoi (青井 葦人, Aoi Ashito)
Voiced by: Kōki Ohsuzu (Japanese); Ciarán Strange (English)
Ashito joined Team Esperion from the Ehime Prefecture after impressing Coach Fukuda with his vision, dedication, and commitment to improving. In the beginning, he played as a forward, but Fukuda converts him into a left back, much to his chagrin.
Eisaku Ohtomo (大友 栄作, Ōtomo Eisaku)
Voiced by: Tatsumaru Tachibana (Japanese); Christopher Llewyn Ramirez, Ben Balmaceda (14–24) (English)
A central/holding midfielder for Esperion's B Team and Ashito's first friend at Esperion. Although he looks like a coward and has quite a childish personality, Ohtomo is praised by his teammates and coaches for his composure, leadership, and link-up ability.
Sōichirō Tachibana (橘 総一朗, Tachibana Sōichirō)
Voiced by: Seiichirō Yamashita (Japanese); Clifford Chapin (English)
A center forward for Esperion's B Team and friend of Ashito. He was a former player for Tokyo Musashino.
Keiji Togashi (冨樫 慶司, Togashi Keiji)
Voiced by: Taku Yashiro (Japanese); Marcus D. Stimac (English)
A center-back for Esperion's B Team and Ashito's roommate.
Kanpei Kuroda (黒田 勘平, Kuroda Kanpei)
Voiced by: Shun Horie (Japanese); Ry McKeand (English)
An Esperion academy graduate and central midfielder for Esperion's B Team.
Jun Martis Asari (朝利 マーチス 淳, Asari Māchisu Jun)
Voiced by: Wataru Katoh (Japanese); Mitchell Stephens (English)
An Esperion academy graduate and full-back for Esperion's B Team.
Yūma Motoki (本木 遊馬, Motoki Yūma)
Voiced by: Junya Enoki (Japanese); Ricco Fajardo (English)
An Esperion academy graduate and forward who was newly promoted to Esperion's A Team.
Ryūichi Takeshima (竹島 龍一, Takeshima Ryūichi)
Voiced by: Kentarō Kumagai (Japanese); Austin Tindle (English)
An Esperion academy graduate and center-back for Esperion's B Team.
Tatsuya Fukuda (福田 達也, Fukuda Tatsuya)
Voiced by: Chikahiro Kobayashi (Japanese); Eric Vale (English)
The head coach of Tokyo Esperion Youth Team A and former footballer.
Nagisa Akutsu (阿久津 渚, Akutsu Nagisa)
Voiced by: Shunsuke Takeuchi (Japanese); Brienne Olvera (English)
A center-back for Esperion's A Team. He tends to be Ashito's harshest critic.
Haruhisa Kuribayashi (栗林 晴久, Kuribayashi Haruhisa)
Voiced by: Yūichirō Umehara (Japanese); Garret Storms (English)
The playmaker for Esperion's A Team.
Taira Nakamura (中村 平, Nakamura Taira)
Voiced by: Kensho Ono (Japanese); Jason Liebrecht (English)
Yōichi Kiriki (桐木 曜一, Kiriki Yōichi)
Voiced by: Koki Uchiyama (Japanese); Ethan Gallardo (English)
Eita Takasugi (高杉 榮太, Takasugi Eita)
Voiced by: Makoto Furukawa (Japanese); Christopher Wehkamp (English)
Kenta Yoshitsune (義経 健太, Yoshitsune Kenta)
Voiced by: Kazuyuki Okitsu (Japanese); David Matranga (English)
Nozomi Date (伊達 望, Date Nozomi)
Voiced by: Hiroki Yasumoto (Japanese); Robert McCollum (English)
The head coach of Esperion's B Team.

=== Supporting characters ===
Hana Ichijō (一条 花, Ichijō Hana)
Voiced by: Maki Kawase (Japanese); Marisa Duran (English)
Fukuda's younger step-sister and nutritionist. She does not understand football, but she declares herself as Ashito's biggest fan.
Anri Kaidō (海堂 杏里, Kaidō Anri)
Voiced by: Reina Ueda (Japanese); Molly Zhang (English)
The heiress of one of Tokyo Esperion's sponsors. She has substantial football knowledge and hopes to be a manager one day. She also develops a crush on Ashito.
Aoi Kaneko (金子 葵, Kaneko Aoi)
Voiced by: Mikako Komatsu (Japanese); Giovannie Cruz (English)
Noriko Aoi (青井 紀子, Aoi Noriko)
Voiced by: Mie Sonozaki (Japanese); Monica Rial (English)
Ashito and Shun's mother. She is initially against Ashito joining Tokyo Esperion due to lack of funds.
Shun Aoi (青井 瞬, Aoi Shun)
Voiced by: Yoshiki Nakajima (Japanese); Blake McNamara (English)
Ashito's older brother and former footballer.

=== Tokyo Musashino ===
Akinori Kaneda (金田 晃教, Kaneda Akinori)
Voiced by: Takuya Eguchi (Japanese); Cody Savoie (English)
A former trialist at Tokyo Esperion seeking revenge against Ashito.
Junnosuke Nakano (中野 淳之介, Nakano Junnosuke)
Voiced by: Koutaro Nishiyama (Japanese); Kevin D. Thelwell (English)
Another former trialist at Tokyo Esperion who makes friends with Ashito at the trial.
Chiaki Mutō (武藤 千秋, Mutō Chiaki)
Voiced by: Yūki Ono (Japanese); Ivan Jasso (English)
Kōji Satake (佐竹 晃司, Satake Kōji)
Voiced by: Tomoaki Maeno (Japanese); Landon McDonald (English)
The head coach of Tokyo Musashino.
Miyako Tachibana (橘 都, Tachibana Miyako)
Voiced by: Kei Shindō (Japanese); Kat Lozano (English)
Sōichirō's younger sister.

== Media ==
=== Manga ===
Aoashi is written and illustrated by Yūgo Kobayashi, and based on an original concept by Naohiko Ueno. It was serialized in Shogakukan's Weekly Big Comic Spirits from January 5, 2015, to June 23, 2025. Shogakukan collected its 410 individual chapters in 40 tankōbon volumes, released from April 30, 2015, to August 29, 2025. An alternate tankōbon edition for younger audiences, called Aoashi Junior-ban (アオアシ ジュニア版), began publication on March 17, 2022; this edition, published under the Shōnen Sunday Comics imprint, features furigana and a full-color guide written by former Kawasaki Frontale player Kengo Nakamura. The 40th and final volume of the Junior-ban edition was released on December 18, 2025.

The series is licensed in Southeast Asia by Shogakukan Asia. On May 26, 2025, Titan Publishing Group's Titan Manga imprint announced that it had licensed the series for English publication. The series is being released in 3-in-1 omnibus volumes, with the first volume released on June 9, 2026.

==== Spin-offs ====
A spin-off manga series by Kobayashi, titled Aoashi Brotherfoot (アオアシ ブラザーフット, Aoashi Burazāfutto), was serialized for five chapters in Weekly Big Comic Spirits from July 12 to August 23, 2021. The series resumed on April 6, 2026. The series was published monthly in the magazine before switching to a weekly schedule in July 2026. Shogakukan released its first tankōbon volume on August 30, 2021. As of June 30, 2026, two volumes have been released. Kobayashi stated that he plans to finish the series in six volumes.

A two-part spin-off manga by Kobayashi, titled Aoashi: Midnight Diner (アオアシ ミッドナイト・ダイナー, Aoashi Middonaito Dainā) was published in Big Comic Original from May 20 to June 5, 2024. Both parts were included in the main series's 36th and 37th volumes, released on June 28 and September 30, 2024, respectively.

Another two-part spin-off manga by Kobayashi, titled Aoashi: Shonan True Lies (アオアシ 湘南トゥルーライズ, Aoashi Shōnan Turū Raizu), was published in Big Comic Original on September 18 and October 5, 2026.

Another spin-off manga by Kobayashi, titled Aoashi: Ihō no Hito (アオアシ 異邦のひと; lit. 'Aoashi: The Stranger') started in Big Comic Original on October 20, 2026.

==== Volumes ====
No.	Original release date	Original ISBN	English release date	English ISBN
1	April 30, 2015	978-4-09-186892-3	June 9, 2026	978-1-78774-864-4
1. "First Touch" (ファーストタッチ, Fāsuto Tatchi); 2. "Tokyo City Esperion" (東京シティエスペリオン, Tōkyō Shiti Esuperion); 3. "Essential Light" (不可欠な光, Fukaketsuna Hikari); 4. "Intelligence" (思考力, Shikō-ryoku); 5. "A Flash of Light" (一閃, Issen); 6. "A Thinking Reed" (考える葦, Kangaeru Ashi); 7. "Meeting" (会合する, Kaigō Suru)
2	July 30, 2015	978-4-09-187144-2	June 9, 2026	978-1-78774-864-4
8. Chōsen (挑戦); 9. Saishū Shiken Kaishi (最終試験開始); 10. Honryō (本領); 11. Akutsu (阿久津); 12. Ressei (劣勢); 13. Jukensei ni Tsugu (受験生に告ぐ); 14. Tsumetai me (冷たい目); 15. Ganbatteru (がんばってる); 16. "Crow"; 17. "Clock Strikes"; 18. Sōkatsu (総括)
3	October 30, 2015	978-4-09-187307-1	June 9, 2026	978-1-78774-864-4
19. (合否); 20. Orenji-iro no Keshiki Zenpen (オレンジ色の景色前編); 21. Orenji-iro no Keshiki Chūhen (オレンジ色の景色中編); 22. Orenji-iro no Keshiki Kōhen (オレンジ色の景色後編); 23. J Yūsu no Tokken (Jユースの特権); 24. Saikai (再会); 25. Shōkaku-sei (昇格生); 26. Sukauto-sei (スカウト生); 27. Ichijo Hana 1 (一条花1); 28. Ichijo Hana 2 (一条花2)
4	January 29, 2016	978-4-09-187433-7	October 6, 2026	978-1-78774-865-1
29. Yūsu Uijin (ユース初陣); 30. "Walk"; 31. Chōhatsu (挑発); 32. Masshiro (真っ白); 33. Mushi (無視); 34. Tenteki (天敵); 35. Hana no Tsui Iro (花の追爐); 36. Yoru Neri (夜練); 37. Dōshitsu no Otoko (同室の男); 38. Suparuta Rīzento (スパルタリーゼント); 39. Hirogaru Sashi Rikiichi (広がるサシ力一)
5	April 28, 2016	978-4-09-187595-2	October 6, 2026	978-1-78774-865-1
40. "A1"; 41. "A2"; 42. "A3"; 43. Kyūjitsu no Sugoshi Kata 1 (休日のすごしかた1); 44. Kyūjitsu no Sugoshi Kata 2 (休日のすごしかた2); 45. Nyūgakushiki Tōjitsu no Fūkei (入学式当日の風景); 46. Yuzurenai Koto (譲れないこと); 47. Tōkyōto Rīgu Dai 1-setsu Narikyō Kōkō-sen (東京都リーグ第1節成京高校戦); 48. HT + kinkyū Mītingu (HT +緊急ミーティング); 49. Shikō no Nami (思考の波); 50. "Eye to Eye"
6	July 29, 2016	978-4-09-187716-1	October 6, 2026	978-1-78774-865-1
51. "3"; 52. Kotae-awase (答え合わせ); 53. "Eagle Eye 1"; 54. "Eagle Eye 2"; 55. "Eagle Eye 3"; 56. Shukushō no Yoru (祝勝の夜); 57. Saikō Kessaku (最高傑作); 58. Senbō no Taishō (羨望の対象); 59. Tōkyōto Rīgu Dai 2-setsu Kurume Dai Ichi Kōkō-sen (東京都リーグ第2節久留米第一高校戦); 60. Shisen (視線); 61. Ten (転)
7	October 28, 2016	978-4-09-187897-7	December 15, 2026	978-1-78774-866-8
62. "Piece"; 63. Shiki-sha-tachi no Omowaku (指揮者達の思惑); 64. Takaga Sakkā (たかがサッカー); 65. Ki Ryō (帰寮); 66. Miwataseru (見渡せる); 67. Fujiyū (不自由); 68. Irubeki Basho (いるべき場所); 69. Jikaku (自覚); 70. "Please Tell Me"; 71. Kubi (首); 72. Ari (蟻)
8	January 30, 2017	978-4-09-189337-6	December 15, 2026	978-1-78774-866-8
73. Omae Mitai ni (お前みたいに); 74. Mitaka-eki Kitaguchi Nite 1 (三鷹駅北口にて1); 75. Mitaka-eki Kitaguchi Nite 2 (三鷹駅北口にて2); 76. Ureshī (嬉しい); 77. Tōkyōto Rīgu Dai 7-setsu Tama Taiiku Daigaku Fuzoku Kōkō-sen (東京都リーグ第7節多摩体育大学付属高校戦); 78. Futatsu no Kōchingu (二つのコーチング); 79. Chō-kyū (超級); 80. Sentaku (選択); 81. "Wind of Change"; 82. Omaega Ita Toko (お前がいたとこ); 83. Ukanaikao (浮かない顔)
9	April 28, 2017	978-4-09-189487-8	December 15, 2026	978-1-78774-866-8
84. Satake Kantoku (佐竹監督); 85. Oretachi ni nai Mono (俺達にないもの); 86. Kono Chīmu de Ichiban (このチームで一番); 87. In'nen no Honō (因縁の炎); 88. Besuto Menbā (ベストメンバー); 89. 3-nen Hira 1 (3年平刖1); 90. 3-nen Hira 2 (3年平刖2); 91. 3-nen Hira 3 (3年平刖3); 92. Hontōni Yowai Yatsu wa (本当に弱い奴は); 93. 10-bu Dake Inaku Naru (10分だけいなくなる); 94. Tōkyōto Rīgu Dai 8-setsu Tōkyō Musashino Shūkyū-dan Yūsu-sen (東京都リーグ第8節東京武蔵野蹴球団ユース戦)
10	July 28, 2017	978-4-09-189605-6	—	—
11	October 30, 2017	978-4-09-189721-3	—	—
12	February 23, 2018	978-4-09-189796-1	—	—
13	May 30, 2018	978-4-09-189878-4	—	—
14	August 30, 2018	978-4-09-860062-5	—	—
15	November 30, 2018	978-4-09-860133-2	—	—
16	March 29, 2019	978-4-09-860244-5	—	—
17	June 28, 2019	978-4-09-860316-9	—	—
18	October 30, 2019	978-4-09-860404-3	—	—
19	January 30, 2020	978-4-09-860465-4	—	—
20	April 27, 2020	978-4-09-860596-5	—	—
21	July 30, 2020	978-4-09-860679-5	—	—
22	October 30, 2020	978-4-09-860753-2	—	—
23	February 26, 2021	978-4-09-860855-3	—	—
24	May 28, 2021	978-4-09-861047-1	—	—
25	August 30, 2021	978-4-09-861126-3	—	—
26	November 12, 2021	978-4-09-861179-9	—	—
27	February 28, 2022	978-4-09-861251-2	—	—
28	May 30, 2022	978-4-09-861336-6	—	—
29	August 30, 2022	978-4-09-861394-6	—	—
30	November 10, 2022	978-4-09-861468-4	—	—
31	February 28, 2023	978-4-09-861585-8	—	—
32	May 30, 2023	978-4-09-861705-0	—	—
33	September 28, 2023	978-4-09-862518-5	—	—
34	December 27, 2023	978-4-09-862618-2	—	—
35	March 29, 2024	978-4-09-862689-2	—	—
36	June 28, 2024	978-4-09-862776-9	—	—
37	September 30, 2024	978-4-09-863033-2	—	—
38	December 25, 2024	978-4-09-863085-1	—	—
39	April 30, 2025	978-4-09-863409-5	—	—
40	August 29, 2025	978-4-09-863533-7	—	—

=== Anime ===
An anime television series adaptation was announced in May 2021. The series is produced by Production I.G and directed by Akira Satō, with scripts written by Masahiro Yokotani, and character designs by Manabu Nakatake, Toshie Kawamura, Asuka Yamaguchi, and Saki Hasegawa, with Nakatake and Yamaguchi also serving as chief animation directors. Masaru Yokoyama composed the music. It aired from April 9 to September 24, 2022, on NHK Educational TV. The first opening theme song is "Mushin Hakusū" (無心拍数; 'Innocent Beat Count'), performed by Alexandros, while the first ending theme song is "Blue Diary", performed by Rinne. The second opening theme song is "Presence", performed by Superfly, while the second ending theme song is "Color Lily no Koibumi" (カラー・リリィの恋文; lit. 'Color Lily's Love Letter'), performed by Kami wa Saikoro wo Furanai.

On April 30, 2025, a second season was announced. It is produced by TMS Entertainment and directed by Kazuki Yokoyama, with Asami Taguchi and Junko Yamanaka handling character designs alongside Nakatake. It premiered on October 4, 2026. The season will air for 24 episodes. For the second season, the opening theme song is "Fortress Defense", performed by 10-Feet, while the ending theme song is "Triangle" (トライアングル, Toraianguru), performed by Ai Higuchi.

Crunchyroll streamed the series outside of Asia. On April 11, 2022, Crunchyroll announced that the series would receive an English dub, which premiered on April 23. Disney Platform Distribution licensed the series in Southeast Asia.

Medialink licensed the second season in Southeast Asia.

==== Episodes ====
===== Season 1 (2022) =====
No. overall	No. in season	Title	Directed by (Note: Information is taken from the ending credits of each episode.)	Written by	Storyboarded by	Original release date
1	1	"First Touch"; Transliteration: "Fāsuto Tatchi" (Japanese: ファーストタッチ)	Akira Satō	Masahiro Yokotani	Akira Satō	April 9, 2022
2	2	"Tokyo City Esperion"; Transliteration: "Tōkyō Shiti Esuperion" (Japanese: 東京シティ・エスペリオン)	Hideki Tonokatsu	Masahiro Yokotani	Hideki Tonokatsu	April 16, 2022
3	3	"The Final Stage of Assessment Begins"; Transliteration: "Saishū Shiken Kaishi" (Japanese: 最終試験開始)	Tsuyoshi Tobita	Daisuke Daitō	Akira Satō	April 23, 2022
4	4	"CROW"	Takatoshi Suzuki	Shingo Irie	Akira Satō	April 30, 2022
5	5	"Orange Scenery"; Transliteration: "Orenji Iro no Keshiki" (Japanese: オレンジ色の景色)	Norihiro Naganuma	Masahiro Yokotani	Norihiro Naganuma	May 7, 2022
6	6	"First Fan"; Transliteration: "Saisho no Fan" (Japanese: 最初のファン)	Shōta Hamada	Sumika Hayakawa	Takashi Igari	May 14, 2022
7	7	"The First Youth Match"; Transliteration: "Yūsu Uijin" (Japanese: ユース初陣)	Sumito Sasaki	Shingo Irie	Takayuki Hamana	May 21, 2022
8	8	"Night Training"; Transliteration: "Yoruren" (Japanese: 夜練)	Masahito Otani	Masahiro Yokotani	Marie Tagashira	May 28, 2022
9	9	"A Broader Soccer"; Transliteration: "Hirogaru Sakkā" (Japanese: 広がるサッカー)	Hiromasa Seki	Daisuke Daitō	Jun Soga, Takayuki Hamana	June 4, 2022
10	10	"No Compromises"; Transliteration: "Yuzurenai Koto" (Japanese: 譲れないこと)	Sumio Watanabe	Sumika Hayakawa	Kiyoko Sayama	June 11, 2022
11	11	"Tokyo Metropolis League Match 1 - Seikyo High School"; Transliteration: "Tōkyō-to Rīgu Dai Issetsu Seikyō Kōkō Sen" (Japanese: 東京都リーグ第1節 成京高校戦)	Masahiko Suzuki	Shingo Irie	Akira Satō, Jun Soga, Eisuke Shirai	June 18, 2022
12	12	"Eagle Eye"	Shūji Saitō	Shingo Irie	Jun Soga	June 25, 2022
13	13	"Turn"; Transliteration: "Ten" (Japanese: 転)	Jun Soga	Masahiro Yokotani	Jun Soga	July 2, 2022
14	14	"It's Just Soccer"; Transliteration: "Takaga Sakkā" (Japanese: たかがサッカー)	Norihiro Naganuma	Daisuke Daitō	Norihiro Naganuma	July 9, 2022
15	15	"Where I Ought To Be"; Transliteration: "Irubeki Basho" (Japanese: いるべき場所)	Shōta Hamada	Sumika Hayakawa	Shōta Hamada	July 16, 2022
16	16	"Just Like You"; Transliteration: "Omae Mitai ni" (Japanese: お前みたいに)	Masamitsu Abe	Shingo Irie	Satoshi Shimizu	July 23, 2022
17	17	"Tokyo Metropolis League Match 7 - Tama Sports University High School"; Transliteration: "Tōkyō-to Rīgu Dai Nanasetsu Tama Taiiku Daigaku Fuzoku Kōkō Sen" (Japanese: 東京都リーグ第7節 多摩体育大学附属高校戦)	Sumio Watanabe	Ken'ichi Takeshita	Kazuki Yokoyama	July 30, 2022
18	18	"Wind of Change"	Shinnosuke Tonaka	Ken'ichi Takeshita	Kazuki Yokoyama	August 6, 2022
19	19	"What We Lack"; Transliteration: "Oretachi ni Nai Mono" (Japanese: 俺達にないもの)	Kazumi Yū	Sumika Hayakawa	Kazumi Yū	August 20, 2022
20	20	"The Truly Weak One"; Transliteration: "Hontō ni Yowai Yatsu wa" (Japanese: 本当に弱い奴は)	Masahiko Suzuki	Sumika Hayakawa	Takashi Igari	August 27, 2022
21	21	"Tokyo Metropolis League Match 8 - Tokyo Musashino Football Club Youths"; Transliteration: "Tōkyō-to Rīgu Dai Hassetsu Tōkyō Musashino Shūkyūdan Yūsu Sen" (Japanese: 東京都リーグ第8節 東京武蔵野蹴球団ユース戦)	Shūji Saitō	Shingo Irie	Kazuto Nakazawa	September 3, 2022
22	22	"Like A Demon"; Transliteration: "Shura no Gotoku" (Japanese: 修羅の如く)	Shōta Hamada	Shingo Irie	Tetsuya Takahashi	September 10, 2022
23	23	"Do Your Best. Don't Lose. Fight to Your Limits"; Transliteration: "Ganbare Makeru na Chikara no Kagiri" (Japanese: 頑張れ負けるな力のかぎり)	Sumio Watanabe, Jun Soga	Masahiro Yokotani	Takashi Igari, Jun Soga	September 17, 2022
24	24	"From Now"; Transliteration: "Koko kara" (Japanese: ここから)	Akira Satō	Masahiro Yokotani	Jun Soga, Akira Satō	September 24, 2022

===== Season 2 (2026–2027) =====
No. overall	No. in season	Title	Directed by	Written by	Storyboarded by	Original release date
25	1	"Starting Line"; Transliteration: "Sutāto Rain" (Japanese: スタート・ライン)	Unknown	Unknown	TBA	October 4, 2026

== Reception ==
=== Manga ===
By April 2020, the manga had over 4.5 million copies in circulation, including digital versions; over 10 million copies in circulation, including digital versions, by February 2022; over 12 million copies in circulation by June 2022; over 15 million copies in circulation by August 2022; over 17 million copies in circulation by February 2023; over 18 million copies in circulation by May 2023; over 20 million copies in circulation by April 2024; over 21 million copies in circulation by September 2024; over 23 million copies in circulation by January 2025; over 25 million copies in circulation by March 2026; and over 26 million copies in circulation by August 2026.

Aoashi was nominated for the 10th Manga Taishō awards in 2017, and ranked fourth with 60 points. In 2020, along with Kaguya-sama: Love Is War, the manga won the 65th Shogakukan Manga Award for the general category. The series ranked 20th on the 2022 "Book of the Year" list by Da Vinci magazine.

In March 2023, the manga was recommended by Spanish midfielder Andrés Iniesta.

=== Anime ===
Rebecca Silverman of Anime News Network reviewed the complete anime series: She was critical of the first half for Ashito's interactions with the adults being made up of "cryptic statements and ultimatums" instead of actual coaching, the one-dimensional supporting players and the scarce character designs but was positive towards Ashito's motivation and the potential development for him and the rest of the cast. While critical of the lack of coaching, a better "balance between development and gameplay" and Hana's character going into "stereotypical territory", Silverman praised the second half for Ashito and his friends going through "strong character growth", the payoff to "baffling plot choices" from the previous half and a "solid finale", concluding that "Aoashi has its issues, but it still ends on a particularly strong note, with Ashito lacing up and taking the field with the big boys. It's a good show when all is said and done, and we can only hope that someone licenses the manga or decides to animate more so that we can find out what happens next." Silverman placed Aoashi at number four on her top 5 best anime list of 2022, calling it "an addictive experience, with everything dialed up almost as high as it can go without making it feel like a parody of itself. It's frustrating, it's intense, and I desperately hope we get another season."

== See also ==
- Fermat Kitchen, another manga series by the same author
