= The Legendary Hero Is Dead! =

Japanese manga series

- First tankōbon volume cover

勇者が死んだ! 村人の俺が掘った落とし穴に勇者が落ちた結果。 (Yūsha ga Shinda! Murabito no Ore ga Hotta Otoshiana ni Yūsha ga Ochita Kekka)
- Genre: Adventure, fantasy
- Manga
- Written by: Subaruichi
- Published by: Shogakukan
- English publisher: SEA: Shogakukan Asia
- Imprint: Ura Sunday Comics
- Magazine: Ura Sunday; MangaOne
- Original run: December 16, 2014 – December 14, 2020
- Volumes: 20
- Manga

Yūsha ga Shinda! Kami no Kuni-hen
- Written by: Subaruichi
- Published by: Shogakukan
- Magazine: MangaOne
- Original run: May 9, 2022 – January 19, 2026
- Volumes: 2
- Anime television series
- Directed by: Rion Kujo
- Written by: Yū Satō
- Music by: Kana Utatane; Yūki Nara; Yamazo; Kayo Konishi; Yukio Kondо̄
- Studio: Liden Films
- Licensed by: Crunchyroll: SA / SEA: Muse Communication
- Original network: Tokyo MX, BS11, Family Gekijo
- Original run: April 7, 2023 – June 23, 2023
- Episodes: 12
- icon

The Legendary Hero Is Dead! (勇者が死んだ! 村人の俺が掘った落とし穴に勇者が落ちた結果。, Yūsha ga Shinda! Murabito no Ore ga Hotta Otoshiana ni Yūsha ga Ochita Kekka) is a Japanese manga series written and illustrated by Subaruichi. It was serialized in Shogakukan's Ura Sunday website and MangaOne app from December 2014 to December 2020, with its chapters collected into twenty tankōbon volumes. An anime television series adaptation produced by Liden Films aired from April to June 2023.

== Premise ==
Sion Bladen sealed away the Demon King and his army at Hell's Gate. Now, with the Demon King ready to rise again, Sion jumps back into battle to face his sworn enemy. Unfortunately, he ends up getting killed in a pit trap dug by farmer Touka Scott who was trying to defend himself from the demons. With no other option, necromancer Anri Haysworth puts Touka's perverted soul in the deceased body of Sion to pose as him. Along with Touka's childhood friend Yuna Eunice, the three mismatched heroes must rise to the challenge, and seal the Gates of Hell.

== Characters ==
Touka Scott (トウカ・スコット, Tōka Sukotto)
Voiced by: Wataru Katoh, Shun'ichi Toki (Japanese); Ricco Fajardo (English)
An ordinary farmer who was forced to pose as the Hero Sion after his pit trap accidentally killed the Hero. His soul was extracted and put in Sion's corpse as a result, until he actually became the next hero.
Sion Bladan (シオン・ブレイダン, Shion Bureidan)
Voiced by: Shun'ichi Toki (Japanese); Justin Briner (English)
The hero whose accidental death forces the necromancer Anri to extract Touka's soul and put it in his body. It was eventually revealed that his death was suicide due to massive trauma throughout his journey, and committed the worst crime by incompletely sealing the Gates of Hell to save Anri.
Anri Haysworth (アンリ・ヘイズワース, Anri Heizuwāsu)
Voiced by: Ayana Taketatsu (Japanese); Michelle Rojas (English)
The snot-nosed necromancer partner of Sion Bladan, hailing from a necromancer clan whose ancestors were humans trapped into the Demon world. She used her power to extract Touka Scott's soul and put it in Sion's corpse.
Yuna Eunice (ユナ・ユニス, Yuna Yunisu)
Voiced by: Hibiku Yamamura (Japanese); Alexis Tipton (English)
Touka's childhood friend, who dreamed of being a mage, but her superhuman strength and absence of magical abilities frustrated her. Initially she had feelings for Sion, as she constantly criticized Touka, later, she is now in love with the latter, but due to the results of her past mistreatment, Touka never acknowledged it, which she immediately regrets.
Marguerit Farom (マルグリット・ファロム, Maruguritto Faromu)
Voiced by: Yurika Kubo (Japanese); Dani Chambers (English)
A princess who develops feelings for Touka, serving as Yuna's love rival.
Kyle Osment (カイル・オズメント, Kairu Ozumento)
Voiced by: Yuichi Nakamura (Japanese); Bradley Gareth (English)
Sion's former partner, who tries to get Sion's body for himself.
Millie Eunice (ミリィ・ユニス, Mirī Yunisu)
Voiced by: Sakura Shinfuku
Yuna's younger sister.
Ethel Borgnine (エセル・ボーグナイン, Eseru Bōgunain)
Voiced by: Sayaka Ohara (Japanese); Caitlin Glass (English)
A warrior who helps Touka on his journey.
Belarco (ベラーコ, Berāko)
Voiced by: Wataru Hatano
A spearman who also aids Touka on his journey.
Isaac Gardner (アイザック・ガードナー, Aizakku Gādonā)
Voiced by: Takashi Aoki
Marguerit's tutor.
Leland Tallman (リーランド・トールマン, Rīrando Tōruman)
Voiced by: Chikahiro Kobayashi
A mad scientist who possesses X-ray vision. He plotted to create an army of undead skeletons made from people.
Friedrich Norstein (フリードリヒ・ノルシュテイン, Furīdorihi Norushutein)
Voiced by: Kensho Ono
A necromancer who despises humans.
Diego Valentine (ディエゴ・ヴァレンタイン, Diego Varentain)
Voiced by: Shintarō Asanuma
A necromancer who despises humans.

== Media ==
=== Manga ===
Written and illustrated by Subaruichi, The Legendary Hero Is Dead! was serialized in Shogakukan's Ura Sunday website and MangaOne app from December 16, 2014, to December 14, 2020. Twenty tankōbon volumes have been published from May 2015 to March 2021. In Southeast Asia, the series is licensed by Shogakukan Asia.

A spin-off titled Yūsha ga Shinda! Kami no Kuni-hen (勇者が死んだ！ 神の国編) began serialization in the MangaOne app on May 9, 2022. The first volume was published on March 17, 2023. The series has ended with its second volume, released on January 19, 2026.

==== Volumes ====
No.	Japanese release date	Japanese ISBN
1	May 12, 2015	978-4-09-126139-7
2	September 11, 2015	978-4-09-126434-3
3	November 12, 2015	978-4-09-126628-6
4	February 12, 2016	978-4-09-127023-8
5	May 12, 2016	978-4-09-127258-4
6	September 9, 2016	978-4-09-127380-2
7	January 12, 2017	978-4-09-127477-9
8	April 12, 2017	978-4-09-127585-1
9	August 10, 2017	978-4-09-127747-3
10	November 10, 2017	978-4-09-128016-9
11	March 12, 2018	978-4-09-128158-6
12	July 12, 2018	978-4-09-128410-5
13	October 12, 2018	978-4-09-128634-5
14	December 19, 2018	978-4-09-128730-4
15	April 12, 2019	978-4-09-129099-1
16	August 19, 2019	978-4-09-129383-1
17	January 10, 2020	978-4-09-129538-5
18	May 12, 2020	978-4-09-850110-6
19	October 12, 2020	978-4-09-850293-6
20	March 18, 2021	978-4-09-850483-1

=== Anime ===
An anime television series adaptation was announced on April 28, 2022. It is produced by Liden Films and directed by Rion Kujo, with scripts supervised by Yū Satō, character designs by Yosuke Yabumoto, monster and prop designs by Akito Fujiwara, and music composed by Kana Utatane, Yūki Nara, Yamazo, and Moka, a group composed of Kayo Konishi and Yukio Kondо̄. The series aired from April 7 to June 23, 2023, on Tokyo MX and BS11. The opening theme song is "Shinda!" (死んだ！; lit. 'Dead!'), performed by Masayoshi Ōishi, and the ending theme song is "Kawaikutte Ijiwaru Shichau" (可愛くって意地悪しちゃう; lit. 'So Cute That I'll Be Mean to You'), performed by Yurika Kubo. The series has been licensed by Crunchyroll outside Asia, and by Muse Communication in South and Southeast Asia.

==== Episodes ====
No.	Title	Directed by (Note: Information is taken from the ending credits of each episode.)	Written by	Storyboarded by	Original release date
1	"The Legendary Hero Is Dead?!"; Transliteration: "Yūsha ga Shinda!?" (Japanese: 勇者が死んだ！？)	Rion Kujo	Yū Satō	Rion Kujo	April 7, 2023
Three years after the hero Sion sealed the Gates of Hell the demons have somehow returned. Touka harbours a crush on childhood friend Yuna and protects his home from demons by digging spike filled traps. A demon attacks Yuna but it is slain by Sion who abruptly blunders right into Touka's trap and dies, leaving the world without a hero. To protect themselves from blame, the villagers secretly bury Sion. The next morning Touka awakens in Sion's body and necromancer Anri Haysworth reveals she swapped Touka's soul into Sion's corpse so Touka can save the world, holding his original body hostage to ensure obedience. On the journey Touka is challenged by one of Sion's acquaintances and accused of impersonating the real Sion due to his inability to use Sion's holy sword. Anri explains the situation to Sion's old teammate Kyle, who rescues Touka from the mob. Yuna wagers Touka can prove himself by completing a quest to slay demons. Anri confirms Touka lacks the spiritual power to use the sword or even stop Sion's body from continuing to rot. Kyle challenges Touka for the right to replace Touka's soul with his own and take over the role of hero.
2	"The Legendary Hero Impostor"; Transliteration: "Nise no Yūsha" (Japanese: 偽の勇者)	Fumio Maezono	Yū Satō	Rion Kujo	April 14, 2023
Kyle claims he was joking. Scared, Touka attempts to steal back his body from Anri's necklace while she sleeps but instead witnesses Kyle try to kill him by stabbing the necklace. Knowing Kyle wants to kill him Touka tries to avoid Kyle during the quest. While fighting demons they are separated from Anri so Kyle reveals he was jealous Sion became the Hero and tried to secretly assassinate him multiple times, hoping Anri would soul-swap him. Yuna stops Kyle killing Touka while Anri overhears everything Kyle said. Kyle reveals necromancers are part demon so if he takes Anri's crystal heart he can soul-swap himself into Sion. Anri admits necromancers are humans born on the other side of Hell's gate, causing mutations like her crystal heart. Touka decides Anri is actually trustworthy so he will do his best as the hero. Anri decides if Touka saves the world she will marry him. Touka lures Kyle into one of his traps, dropping him deep into the ocean. The quest reward doesn't cover the debts they incurred buying equipment and food so Touka decides they will travel to the royal capital to earn big money. Meanwhile, shadowy individuals decide to target Princess Marguerite.
3	"The Legendary Hero Is a Skeleton!"; Transliteration: "Yūsha ga Hakkotsuka!" (Japanese: 勇者が白骨化！)	Sōta Yokote	Yū Satō	Rion Kujo	April 21, 2023
Touka continues rotting until only his skeleton remains. While meeting Larcvalt, King of Farom, Touka wears a mask of Sion's face, only to discover Larcvalt desperately wanted Sion to marry princess Marguerite. Touka is forced to agree to a date to a masquerade festival in two days. Marguerite passes out from MES, a condition that fatally drains her mana unless she consumes vast amounts of food. A doctor named Leland discovers Anri is a necromancer and offers a potion to restore Touka if they hunt devils for the city. On the hunt they meet Knight Siruela. Yuna and Anri are kidnapped the necromancer Skeleton-Man. Touka discovers Marguerite becomes fat after every meal before her MES rapidly shrinks her, causing him to attempt to place stockings on her plumper thighs, infuriating her tutor Isaac. Marguerite visits her doctor so the bored Touka searches for Yuna and Anri and comes across Leland, Marguerites doctor who is also Skeleton-Man. Leland visits the kidnapped Yuna and unveils his plan; kill everyone and remove their flesh before resurrecting them as immortal skeletons, then give the flesh to the devils in exchange for peace while framing Anri. At the masquerade Touka is excited when Marguerite deliberately wears stockings, further infuriating Isaac who correctly suspects Touka is not the real Sion.
4	"The Legendary Hero and Bride"; Transliteration: "Hanayome to Yūsha" (Japanese: 花嫁と勇者)	Masahiko Watanabe	Yū Satō	Katsuyuki Kodera	April 28, 2023
Marguerite confirms Touka is not Sion by his drastically different personality, overheard by Isaac and Siruela. Marguerite runs away and is found by Leland who lures Marguerite to the slums where he has already skeletonised dozens of people. Touka attempts to rescue her, showing her he is actually a good person, but gets his skull knocked off while Leland escapes with Marguerite. Touka convinces Isaac and Siruela to trust him and infiltrate Leland's dungeon where they rescue Yuna and Anri. Leland begins the ceremony to remove Marguerite's flesh then marry her. Touka interrupts while Siruela battles Leland's demon allies. Leland uses a mana increasing potion, summoning more skeletons to retrieve Marguerite, injuring Isaac. They escape to the woods, amazing Anri with Touka's tactical genius. Touka reveals as a child he learned stealth and strategy to survive attacks by demons after his parents deaths, his confession making Marguerite develop a crush. As Touka desperately needs mana to fight Leland, Isaac reveals a side effect of MES saturates Marguerite's body fluids in mana, so Touka can recover by drinking them. As she cannot cry, and refuses to let Touka lick her sweat, Marguerite embarrassingly concludes she must urinate into poor Touka's mouth.
5	"The Legendary Hero Is Revived"; Transliteration: "Fukkatsu no Yūsha" (Japanese: 復活の勇者)	Kazuya Fujishiro	Yū Satō	Katsuyuki Kodera	May 5, 2023
Touka stops Marguerite at the last possible second by realising Leland is not a necromancer, he just uses a crystal that manipulates the dead. Touka exposes the crystal which Marguerite smashes. Leland is captured but a demon appears with the defeated Siruela. Touka has his skull broken and dies. Having fallen in love with him Marguerite cries enough tears that Touka's body regenerates and he uses the hero's sword to kill the demon. Elsewhere, the necromancer controlling the demon finds Touka interesting. Leland is imprisoned and goes insane. Marguerite realises crying to release her repressed emotions has cured her MES. The king rewards Touka with a magic powered carriage, which Marguerite secretly stows away on to join the hero's party. Touka realises stopping his body rotting uses so much magic he only has a few weeks before becoming a powerless skeleton again. Anri and Marguerite fight over who will marry Touka one day. Yuna questions her own feelings for Touka and, upset by Marguerite's presence, decides to leave. Yuna is bitten by undead and starts to turn into a zombie. She tries to insult Touka into abandoning her, but he refuses. They are both rescued by spearman Belarco, who knows Touka is not the hero.
6	"The Legendary Hero Is a Girl"; Transliteration: "Nyotaika Yūsha" (Japanese: 女体化勇者)	Takahiro Tanaka	Yū Satō	Masayuki Takahashi	May 12, 2023
Belarco suggests taking refuge at the mansion of mayor Dott. Yuna fully transforms but Anri controls her with necromancy, revealing the zombies are people cursed with a spell to heighten aggression and reduce self-control, spread via bites. Needing to find who cast the curse Anri suggests she temporarily possess Yuna to keep her controlled. Touka volunteers instead but once inside Yuna it becomes clear he just wanted to grope her body. Anri and Marguerite foil his every lecherous attempt, even tying him up overnight. A demon breaks into the mansion, allowing zombies inside. After saving Dott he leads the survivors to a secret panic room, including warriors Colin and Neigan whom Touka eventually remembers were allies of Leland during the skeleton incident. Marguerite offers a reduced sentence in exchange for help, which they reluctantly accept. Demons and a high ranking devil destroy the panic room, which also leaves Marguerite half naked, and Belarco is uselessly thrown into the river. Touka kills a demon with his sword, shocking everyone; Touka's soul is currently in Yuna so using the sword without the body of hero Sion should be impossible, unless Touka possesses a truly heroic soul.
7	"A New Legendary Hero"; Transliteration: "Arata na Yūsha" (Japanese: 新たな勇者)	Ryōta Karasawa	Yū Satō	Katsuyuki Kodera	May 19, 2023
Marguerite is ecstatic; if Touka has become the next Hero she can marry him. Colin is bitten then stabbed by necromancer Diego, the one who controlled a demon during the Leland incident. As he killed Sion Diego hopes Touka and Anri will side with the necromancers in wiping out humans for their massacre of necromancers after Sion sealed Hell's gate. Touka refuses so Diego directs his zombies to kill them. Touka bluffs he used a power greater than the hero's to kill Sion, the power of Lushighs (lush thighs). Diego hesitates and is crushed by Dott driving Touka's magic carriage, having been bribed by Lushighs (the chance to see Marguerite naked in stockings). Dott had also brought another legendary hero, Milly Yunis, Yuna's sister, their pervy father Fieri, who prefers breasts over thighs, and Milly's party members Shannon and Dorothy. Diego flees but reveals the zombies will become demons in 24 hours. Touka rounds up the zombies and promises Colin he will kill Diego's demon to save them. Touka manages to pretend he is Yuna to her family. Milly claims she is engaged to Touka whom she loves, angering Marguerite. Fieri, who despises Touka, insists "Yuna" return home, claiming she is too weak to be of any use in a fight, angering Touka. Diego ambushes them with an army of necromancers and demons.
8	"The Legendary Hero Is a Student!"; Transliteration: "Yūsha ga Deshi!" (Japanese: 勇者が弟子！)	Tetsuya Endo	Yū Satō	Yasushi Tomoda	May 26, 2023
Demons controlled by a necromancer kill everyone except Touka. When the necromancer moves to take his sword Touka reveals it was a trick, Anri had stolen control of the demons while everyone faked being killed. Touka realises the necromancer is Ethel, the woman who taught him survival skills after his parents deaths. His reaction causes Milly to realise Touka is controlling Yuna's body, leading to the revelation Touka accidentally killed Sion. Ethel reveals she was there when Hell's gate reopened, and what she saw caused her to support the necromancers. She advises Touka and Anri to go and see for themselves too. Touka convinces Ethel to accompany them. Watching, Diego is amazed the mysterious Lushighs even defeated Ethel. Dott and Belarco board a boat to inform Marguerites father what is happening. Fieri and Ethel turn out to be old enemies. Ethel takes them to have the carriage repaired by Ledo the blind craftsman, who happens to be Sion's grandfather. During repairs Touka learns Milly is not technically a hero, since her sacred sword is actually man-made. While it could slay the demon king only Touka's genuine sacred sword can seal Hells gate. Ethel reveals the necromancers now control the demon king's four generals. Milly is confident Touka will somehow save Yuna from becoming a demon.
9	"Into the Legendary Hero's Past"; Transliteration: "Yūsha Kako e" (Japanese: 勇者過去へ)	Keisuke Nishijima & Yoshifumi Sueda	Yū Satō	Rion Kujo	June 2, 2023
Touka wakes up in the past when his parents were alive but quickly realises it is not real as everyone acts mindless and unresponsive. He is quickly confronted by Yuna, revealing they are inside a magic illusion modelled on his and Yuna's childhood memories, resulting from their souls sharing Yuna's body. They pass from the memory of their first meeting through many others going forward in time to the memory of when Touka first left his hometown of Elvania. Yuna regrets she fought with him that day and didn't say goodbye. They reach the day his mother was killed and Touka is able to say goodbye. The next memory shows Touka was there when Hell's gate reopened. Yuna cannot believe how much of his painful past Touka kept from her and that it was only his feelings for her that helped him survive until he returned home. A devil interrupts, revealing he has infiltrated Touka's mind and forced him to relive his worst memories for amusement. Realising the devil must die to free them Touka finds a memory of himself as a true hero but the devil can read his mind to predict his moves. Touka realises the devils magic only lets him enter one mind at a time, so he cannot see Yuna at all. Knowing this, Yuna controls his arms movements and the devil is easily killed. Awakening in reality Touka finds he can now see and speak to Yuna's soul.
10	"The Raid of the Legendary Hero"; Transliteration: "Sennyū Yūsha" (Japanese: 潜入勇者)	Kazuya Fujishiro	Yū Satō	Katsuyuki Kodera	June 9, 2023
Touka's soul is forced back into Sion's body as a result of Yuna's soul regaining consciousness. They attempt to hide Yuna's body in the carriage, but are caught by Fieri. Bellarco and Dott reach the city. Diego and the necromancers kill the Order of Magical Warriors sent by Marguerites father. Dott convinces him to send an army of knights, with Isaac and Siruela also taking the imprisoned Kyle, who survived Touka's attempt to drown him. Fieri forgives Touka under condition he admits breasts are superior to thighs. Ledo, who can see souls despite his blindness, is happy to see Sion's soul hiding in the Hero Sword. Free again, Kyle still plans to steal Sion's body from Touka. Reaching Elvania to confront Diego, Ethel betrays and stabs Touka with a soul destroying weapon, killing him permanently. However, this was a ruse to get Sion's body inside safely as Anri had actually put Touka's soul back in his own body. Disguised as demons Touka gets close to Adele, the zombie creating demon, and puts her to sleep with a spell. Before he can behead her they are stopped by necromancer Friedrich, Anri's older brother she believed was dead. Yuna and the zombies now have only an hour before becoming demons.
11	"The Legendary Hero Fights to the Death!"; Transliteration: "Yūsha ga Kettō!" (Japanese: 勇者が決闘！)	Kōji Aritomi & Ryōta Karasawa	Yū Satō	Katsuyuki Kodera	June 16, 2023
Friedrich is furious Anri has sided with humans, but also admits he doesn't want to kill all humans, just the royals and nobles responsible for massacring necromancers three years ago. Despite sharing his pain Anri chooses to save lives by siding with Touka. Diego arrives and with the power of demon General Vertex absorbs Adele, meaning to save Yuna Touka must somehow kill Diego. Milly and Marguerite kill many demons using traps left behind by Touka three years ago. Diego merges with Vertex for the duel but is betrayed by Ethel who pins him long enough for Touka to re-possess Sion's corpse and stab Diego. Unfortunately one of Vertex' powers completely absorbs magic attacks and Diego is unharmed. Friedrich confronts Ethel. Yuna remembers Sion defeating Vertex close to their village and realises Vertex can only block attacks he can see coming, so if he is attacked randomly from multiple directions some attacks will hit him. Marguerite is confronted by another necromancer. Touka and Diego wound each other repeatedly, but Touka runs out of mana first and takes a mana potion despite already experiencing overdose symptoms, and passes out. Belarco and Kyle arrive nearby. Yuna's body only has 15 minutes before becoming a demon.
12	"The Legendary Hero Is a Duo!"; Transliteration: "Yūsha ga Futari!" (Japanese: 勇者が二人！)	Rion Kujo	Yū Satō	Rion Kujo	June 23, 2023
Kyle arrives to get revenge on Touka. Touka awakens inside the Hero Sword and meets Sion who shows him a doorway through which every woman he has ever met is naked except for stockings. Sion reveals it is a gift from the Sword, an afterlife tailored to Touka's innermost desires, but if he chooses to enter he won't be able to save Yuna. Touka doesn't hesitate in returning to save Yuna. He returns to Sion's body while Sion's soul temporarily inhabits Touka's body to fight alongside him. Diego is defeated with seconds to spare and is torn apart by demons in revenge for his murdering Adele. Yuna's soul returns to her body completely cured. In the aftermath Ethel and Friedrich disappear. As the new hero Touka is swarmed by women but he is jealously dragged into a nearby bedroom by Yuna. After some hesitation and arguing she decides to reward him for saving her by letting him worship her thighs in a bikini and stockings, only to flee when Touka reveals Sion can probably see her from inside the Sword. Marguerite correctly deduces Yuna has fallen in love with Touka and becomes her friend and rival for his affection. At Sion's urging Touka delays going to Hells Gate until he has permanently increased his mana levels. To that end Sion orders Kyle and Dorothy to guide Touka to a mana manipulation expert, the Sage.
