= Sweet Reincarnation =

Japanese light novel and its adaptations

- First light novel volume cover

おかしな転生 (Okashi na Tensei)
- Genre: Fantasy; Isekai
- Novel series
- Written by: Nozomu Koryu
- Published by: Shōsetsuka ni Narō
- Original run: February 17, 2015 – present
- Light novel
- Written by: Nozomu Koryu
- Illustrated by: Yasuyuki Shuri
- Published by: TO Books
- Imprint: TO Bunko
- Original run: October 20, 2015 – present
- Volumes: 30
- Manga
- Written by: Midori Tomizawa
- Illustrated by: Seriko Iida
- Published by: TO Books
- English publisher: NA: J-Novel Club
- Magazine: Comic Corona
- Original run: December 25, 2017 – present
- Volumes: 14
- Manga

Licorice Diary
- Written by: Kirii
- Published by: TO Books
- Magazine: Comic Corona
- Original run: April 27, 2023 – present
- Volumes: 1
- Anime television series
- Directed by: Naoyuki Kuzuya
- Written by: Mitsutaka Hirota
- Music by: Hiroshi Nakamura
- Studio: SynergySP (Note: Animation production assistance (アニメーション制作協力) for all episodes provided by Studio Comet.)
- Licensed by: Crunchyroll (streaming); SA/SEA: Muse Communication
- Original network: TV Tokyo, BS TV Tokyo, AT-X
- Original run: July 4, 2023 – September 19, 2023
- Episodes: 12
- icon

Sweet Reincarnation (Japanese: おかしな転生, Hepburn: Okashi na Tensei) is a Japanese light novel series written by Nozomu Koryu and illustrated by Yasuyuki Shuri. It began as a web novel that is published in the Shōsetsuka ni Narō website since February 2015. It was later acquired by TO Books, who have published 30 volumes in print since October 2015. A manga adaptation, written by Midori Tomizawa and illustrated by Seriko Iida, has been serialized in the Nico Nico Seiga-based Comic Corona manga service since December 2017, with its chapters collected into fourteen tankōbon volumes as of April 2026. An anime television series adaptation produced by SynergySP aired from July to September 2023.

== Plot ==
A talented pastry chef dies before achieving his dream of creating a new type of dessert and is reincarnated in a fantasy world as Pastry Mille Morteln, the young heir of a poor noble family. Retaining his memories and passion for sweets, Pastry is determined to pursue confectionery.

Living in a frontier territory under his father, a talented but war-focused lord, Pastry begins learning both magic and combat to help protect his land from threats, such as bandits and political conflicts. At the same time, he uses his knowledge from his previous life to experiment with making sweets, gradually introducing new ideas and techniques to those around him. He begins working toward creating a land where sweets can be widely enjoyed, balancing his personal dream with the realities of his status.

== Characters ==
Pastry Mille Morteln (ペイストリー=ミル=モルテールン, Peisutorī Miru Morutērun)
Voiced by: Ayumu Murase (Japanese); Trina Nishimura (English)
Marcarullo Doroba (マルカルロ=ドロバ, Marukaruro Doroba)
Voiced by: Natsumi Fujiwara (Japanese); Molly Zhang (English)
Luminito Aidolihappa (ルミニート=アイドリハッパ, Ruminīto Aidorihappa)
Voiced by: Maaya Uchida (Japanese); Reshel Mae (English)
Licorice Mille Hubarek (リコリス=ミル=フバーレク, Rikorisu Miru Fubāreku)
Voiced by: Kaede Hondo (Japanese); Emi Lo (English)
Casserole Mille Morteln (カセロール=ミル=モルテールン, Kaserōru Miru Morutērun)
Voiced by: Hiroshi Tsuchida (Japanese); David Matranga (English)
Josephine Mille Morteln (ジョゼフィーネ=ミル=モルテールン, Jozefīne Miru Morutērun)
Voiced by: Rumi Okubo (Japanese); Thi Le (English)
Feuille Beetwin (シイツ=ビートウィン, Shiitsu Bītowin)
Voiced by: Yū Wakabayashi (Japanese); Charles Nguyen (English)
Petra Mille Hubarek (ペトラ=ミル=フバーレク, Petora Miru Fubāreku)
Voiced by: Kaya Okuno (Japanese); Macy Anne Johnson (English)
Squale Mille Kadlecek (スクヮーレ=ミル=カドレチェク, Sukwāre Miru Kadorecheku)
Voiced by: Wataru Katoh (Japanese); Ben Stegmair (English)
Anies Mill Morteln (アニエス=ミル=モルテールン, Aniesu Miru Morutērun)
Voiced by: Hitomi Nabatame (Japanese); Cassie Ewulu (English)
Brioche Salgret Mill Retes (ブリオシュ=サルグレット=ミル=レーテシュ, Burioshu Saruguretto Miru Rēteshu)
Voiced by: Yoko Hikasa (Japanese); Brianna Roberts (English)

== Media ==
=== Light novel ===
Written by Nozomu Koryu, the light novel began publication on the Shōsetsuka ni Narō website on February 17, 2015. The same year on October 20, TO Books acquired the novel and began imprint publishing of it, with illustrations by Yasuyuki Shuri. As of April 2026, 30 volumes have been released.

No.	Title	Japanese release date	Japanese ISBN
1	Apple Pie with a Smile (アップルパイは笑顔と共に, Appuri Pai wa Egao to Tomo ni)	October 20, 2015	978-4-86-472428-9
2	Honeymoon (蜂蜜の月, Hachimitsu no Tsuki)	November 20, 2015	978-4-86-472429-6
3	Pumpkin Pie and a Romantic Rival (パンプキンパイと恋の好敵手, Panpukin Pai to Koi no Kōtekishu)	July 10, 2016	978-4-86-472501-9
4	The Runaway Son has a Fruit Flavor (家出息子はフルーツ味, Iede Musuko wa Furūtsu Aji)	August 10, 2016	978-4-86-472502-6
5	Romantic Affair of the Raisin Bread (レーズンパンの恋模様, Rēzun Pan no Koi-moyō)	November 10, 2016	978-4-86-472536-1
6	Sugar Confectionary is a Recipe of Conflict (糖衣菓子は争いの元, Tōi Kashi wa Arasoi no Moto)	March 10, 2017	978-4-86-472563-7
7	Baked Dishes for a Broken Engagement (婚約破棄には焼き菓子を, Kon'yaku-Haki ni wa Yaki Kashi o)	July 10, 2017	978-4-86-472596-5
8	Sweets That Call Happiness (幸せを呼ぶスイーツ, Shiawase o Yobu Suītsu)	December 9, 2017	978-4-86-472637-5
9	Let Me Complete the Fruits Battle (戦いはフルーツに合わせて, Tatakai Furūtsu ni Awasete)	March 10, 2018	978-4-86-472660-3; 978-4-86-472659-7 (SE)
10	Put Raspberry In the Unrequited Love (片思いにはラズベリーを, Kataomoi ni wa Rasuberī o)	July 10, 2018	978-4-86-472703-7
11	An Artist with Some Baked Goods (詐欺師は焼き菓子と共に, Sagishi wa Yaki Kashi to Tomoni)	November 10, 2018	978-4-86-472750-1
12	Candies and Sticks for Students (学生たちには飴と鞭, Gakusei-tachi ni wa Ame to Muchi)	July 10, 2019	978-4-86-472835-5
13	The Cotton Candy's Romantic Affair (綿飴の恋模様, Wataame no Koi-moyō)	August 10, 2019	978-4-86-472836-2
14	The Chocolate Pie That Flies in the sky: Pie in the Sky (空飛ぶチョコレート・パイ～Pie in the sky～, Soratobu Chokorēto Pai: Pie in the Sky)	January 10, 2020	978-4-86-472895-9
15	The Dragon Likes Fruits (ドラゴンはフルーツがお好き, Doragon wa Furūtsu ga o Suki)	May 9, 2020	978-4-86-472978-9
16	Conspiracy is Dark and Bittersweet (陰謀は黒くてほろ苦く, Inbō wa Kurokute Horo Nigaku)	November 10, 2020	978-4-86-699072-9
17	The Resurrection Egg: Easter Egg (復活の卵～イースター・エッグ～, Fukkatsu no Tamago: Īsutā Eggu)	March 10, 2021	978-4-86-699167-2
18	Strawberry Tart is the Teary Flavor (イチゴタルトは涙味, Ichigo Taruto wa Namida Aji)	August 10, 2021	978-4-86-699295-2
19	Financier of Dark Struggles (暗闘のフィナンシェ, Antō no Finanshie)	December 20, 2021	978-4-86-699384-3
20	Sweets Call Forth Spring (スイーツは春を告げる, Suītsu wa Haru o Tsugeru)	May 10, 2022	978-4-86-699505-2
21	Sweets and Cold Relationship (スイーツと冷たい関係, Suītsu to Tsumetai Kankei)	August 10, 2022	978-4-86-699574-8
22	蜜蝋は未来を照らす	January 10, 2023	978-4-86-699732-2
23	Fluffy Sweets are Twice as Delicious (ふわふわお菓子は二度美味しい, Fuwa-fuwa Kashi wa Nido Oishī)	April 10, 2023	978-4-86-699806-0
24	Ice Cream Timing (アイスクリームはタイミング, Aisu Kurīmu wa Taimingu)	July 10, 2023	978-4-86-699870-1; 978-4-86-699871-8 (SE)
25	A Treasure Hunt with a Southern Flavor (お宝探しは南国の味, Otakara-sagashi Nankoku no Aji)	October 10, 2023	978-4-86-699968-5
26	Orangette Carries the Scent of Turmoil (オランジェットは騒乱の香り, Oranjetto wa Sōran no Kaori)	April 15, 2024	978-4-86-794158-4
27	A Gentle and Melting Treat After the Battle (優しいくちどけは戦いのあとに, Yasashī Kuchi-doke wa Tatakai no Ato ni)	September 20, 2024	978-4-86-794315-1
28	The Perfect Reading Companion is a Fruit Sandwich (読書のお供はフルーツサンド, Dokusho no Otomo wa Furūtsu Sando)	February 15, 2025	978-4-86-794462-2
29	Fresh-baked Goods for the Dragons (ドラゴンたちには焼きたてを, Doragon-tachi ni wa Yakitate o)	September 1, 2025	978-4-86-794688-6
30	Golden Brown for the Jesters (道化師たちはこんがりと, Dōkeshi-tachi wa Kongari to)	April 10, 2026	978-4-86-794959-7

=== Manga ===
A manga adaptation, written by Midori Tomizawa and illustrated by Seriko Iida, began serialization in the Comic Corona manga service on December 25, 2017. As of April 2026, fourteen tankōbon volumes have been released. In April 2019, J-Novel Club announced that it had licensed the manga for an English digital release.

A spin-off manga written and illustrated by Kirii, titled Sweet Reincarnation: Licorice Diary began serialization on the Comic Corona website on April 27, 2023. As of September 2023, one volume has been published.

No.	Original release date	Original ISBN	English release date	English ISBN
1	August 1, 2018	978-4-86-472721-1	November 26, 2019	978-1-71-834700-7
2	December 1, 2018	978-4-86-472756-3	May 5, 2020	978-1-71-834701-4
3	July 1, 2019	978-4-86-472832-4	September 15, 2020	978-1-71-834702-1
4	January 20, 2020	978-4-86-472894-2	July 27, 2021	978-1-71-834703-8
5	August 15, 2020	978-4-86-699034-7	September 7, 2021	978-1-71-834704-5
6	April 1, 2021	978-4-86-699171-9	January 25, 2022	978-1-71-834705-2
7	December 1, 2021	978-4-86-699383-6	October 5, 2022	978-1-71-834706-9
8	August 16, 2022	978-4-86-699575-5	October 11, 2023	978-1-71-834707-6
9	January 14, 2023	978-4-86-699736-0	January 3, 2024	978-1-71-834708-3
10	August 15, 2023	978-4-86-699920-3	August 21, 2024	978-1-71-834709-0
11	April 15, 2024	978-4-86-794150-8	June 25, 2025	978-1-71-834777-9
12	February 15, 2025	978-4-86-794450-9	December 3, 2025	978-1-71-834778-6
13	September 1, 2025	978-4-86-794680-0	August 26, 2026	978-1-71-834779-3
14	April 10, 2026	978-4-86-794939-9	—	—

==== Sweet Reincarnation: Licorice Diary ====
No.	Original release date	Original ISBN	English release date	English ISBN
1	September 15, 2023	978-4-86-699943-2	—	—

=== Anime ===
In August 2022, it was announced that Sweet Reincarnation would receive an anime television series adaptation. It is produced by SynergySP, with cooperation from Studio Comet, and directed by Naoyuki Kuzuya, with scripts written by Mitsutaka Hirota, character designs handled by Tomoko Miyakawa, and music composed by Hiroshi Nakamura. The anime aired from July 4 to September 19, 2023, on TV Tokyo and other networks. (Note: TV Tokyo listed the series premiere on July 3 at 25:30, which is effectively July 4 at 1:30 a.m. JST.) The opening theme song is "Brand-new Day" by Sana from Sajou no Hana, while the ending theme song is "Fūmizekka" (風味絶佳; lit. 'Delicious Taste') by YuNi. Crunchyroll streamed the anime series. Muse Communication licensed the series in Southeast Asia.

==== Episodes ====
No.	Title	Directed by (Note: Information is taken from the ending credits of each episode.)	Written by	Storyboarded by	Original release date
1	"Dreaming of a Land of Sweets"; Transliteration: "Yume wa Okashi no Kuni" (Japanese: 夢はお菓子の国)	Masafumi Satō	Mitsutaka Hirota	Naoyuki Kuzuya	July 4, 2023
During the world champion sweet making competition, a famous sweet maker is accidentally crushed by his own candy statue. Full of regret he never became the worlds greatest sweet maker he is given a second chance by a goddess who reincarnates him into an alternate world as Pastry Mille Morteln, son of minor lord Casserole and his wife Agnes. Pastry retains his passion for sweets but their farmlands can only produce wheat and barley, and sugar is an expensive luxury. By improving farming techniques Pastry hopes he can bring about a dessert renaissance in his new world. Bandits threaten their farms so Casserole decides Pastry will undergo Sanctification, a religious ceremony to unlock his magical powers. Teleporting to the capital Pastry sees for the first time this world's fruits and exotic foods and is determined to achieve his dream. During Sanctification Pastry is denied all sensory stimulation for 48 hours, which he endures by imagining all the desserts he will create, and unlocks a powerful magic ability called Replication. Casserole makes a donation to the church but the greedy priest, who secretly despises Casserole for earning his lordship through military victories instead of noble birth, is unsatisfied with the amount and decides to sell information about Pastry's abilities to whoever can afford it.
2	"The Patissier and the Fief's Defense Line"; Transliteration: "Patishie to Ryōchi Bōeisen" (Japanese: パティシエと領地防衛戦)	Yoshitaka Koyama	Mitsutaka Hirota	Yoshitaka Koyama	July 11, 2023 (Note: From Episode 2, episodes are released on select platforms 1 week before their air dates on television.)
With the bandits only days away Casserole orders all crops harvested, all water sources blocked up and all his people to gather in his village with the crops to draw the bandits directly to them, reducing collateral damage from the expected battle. The bandits arrive, hungry and eager to plunder the crops. Fearing he will never realise his dream of creating desserts Pastry begins planning a defensive strategy. Casserole discovers the bandits are all ex-cavalry who deserted from the army, leading a group of prisoners as human shields. They lure the cavalry in close where Pastry and the village children cause chaos with slingshots and flaming arrows. As the bandits make their way inside they kill several villagers and Pastry is taken hostage by the bandit's leader. Having fallen into his trap Pastry reveals his Replication ability can copy absolutely anything he sees, so he "copies" one bandits fire burned face onto all the bandits, crippling them with the pain and ending the battle in an instant.
3	"Apple Pie and Smiles"; Transliteration: "Appuru Pai wa Egao to Tomo ni" (Japanese: アップルパイは笑顔と共に)	Masahiko Watanabe	Mitsutaka Hirota	Naoyuki Kuzuya	July 18, 2023
The bandits are restrained in the barn. For political reasons they are to be handed over to Countess Brioche of Retes territory where the bandits came from, so the Countess can retain her reputation by claiming she captured the bandits, since it was her responsibility in the first place. Pastry's friends Marc and Lumi are awarded swords taken from the bandits and assigned as Pastry's future lieutenants. Curious about the bandits, Marc and Lumi sneak into the barn where the bandit leader tricks Marc into coming too close, steals back his sword, stabs Lumi and escapes with Marc as a hostage. Pastry follows after them and manages to rescue Marc while the bandit escapes. Pastry is forced to admit to Casserole they only survived thanks to having secretly replicated Casserole's Teleportation magic onto himself. Casserole swears Pastry to secrecy; if it was revealed Pastry can replicate every magic spell in existence, powerful people would try turning him into a living weapon. Marc apologizes to Lumi for getting her hurt and Pastry bakes a Bonka (apple) pie to celebrate. Lumi's father Glacage suggests that Marc should properly atone his mistake by marrying Lumi, and Lumi nonchalantly agrees, leaving Marc embarrassed about being engaged to be married to Lumi.
4	"A Spicy Negotiation and Sweet Baked Treats"; Transliteration: "Karakuchi Kōshō to Amai Yakigashi" (Japanese: 辛口交渉と甘い焼き菓子)	Kyōhei Suzuki	Mitsutaka Hirota	Naoyuki Kuzuya	July 25, 2023
Casserole is short of money for repairs to his lands following the bandit invasion. As his sister Josephine is almost old enough to marry Pastry has a brilliant idea. Nobles arranging marriages for their children travel extensively so their children can meet potential spouses. As travel is expensive Pastry suggests replicating images of their children's faces. These "matchmaking pictures" can be sent back and forth by messenger cheaper than people travelling for weeks and are a guaranteed commercial success. Casserole and Pastry visit Countess Brioche, a shrewd politician. She serves tea and sweet biscuits to impress them with her wealth, yet is confused when Pastry clearly dislikes them and completely thrown off balance when it is Pastry, not Casserole, who mentions her failure to eradicate the bandits. Catching her in several lies Pastry expertly manipulates Brioche into admitting responsibility and paying compensation for the damage to Casserole's lands. Accepting defeat Brioche asks what was wrong with her biscuits and is surprised at his answer; the biscuits were actually too sugary and not a good match for the flavour of tea. Brioche decides Pastry might be worth keeping an eye on and is amazed by his gift of a replicated picture of her.
5	"Sweet Matchmaking Photos and Twin Ladies"; Transliteration: "Amai Omiai Shashin to Futago no Reijō" (Japanese: 甘いお見合い写真と双子の令嬢)	Masafumi Satō	Mitsutaka Hirota	Shigeru Kimiya	August 1, 2023
At a banquet held by Lord Kadlececk, leader of the Kingdoms army, Pastry and Casserole meet his grandson Squale. While demonstrating his picture making magic Pastry causes Squale to fall for a picture of Lady Petra Hubarek, who is seeking a husband. Kadlececk is furious Pastry manipulated Squale as the Hubarek's are in a constant feud with their neighbouring duchy. However, he rethinks his anger when Pastry secretly informs him Margrave Hubarek is using Petra's betrothal for illicit means in his ongoing feud. Impressed by his political awareness Kadlececk publicly visits Margrave Hubarek so Squale can meet Petra, cleverly bringing the feud to the King's personal attention, as Pastry had hoped. Days later Squale is secretly engaged to Petra. As Hubarek's enemies will be angered by this if they find out Kadlececk hires Casserole to safely escort Petra to the capital for her coming-of-age ceremony, where the biggest problem will be stopping the church leaking news of the secret engagement. Pastry has the brilliant idea to hide Petra in the churches Sanctification chamber, protected from assassins and preventing the church prying. On the journey the carriage is attacked by assassins. Pastry defends Petra and her sister Licorice, causing Licorice to develop a crush on him.
6	"Schemes and Frothy Hearts"; Transliteration: "Bōryaku to Awadatsu Kokoro" (Japanese: 謀略と泡立つ心)	Yoshihiro Mori	Mitsutaka Hirota	Mitsuko Ōya; Naoyuki Kuzuya	August 8, 2023
Casserole teleports them the rest of the way to the Cathedral in the city. Elsewhere, Lord Armire, the enemy of Margrave Hubarek, hires mercenaries to kidnap Petra. This would disgrace Lord Kadlececk and, by pretending to rescue her, would restore Lord Armire to his former noble status by being allowed to marry Petra himself. Petra begins her Sanctification so Casserole sends Pastry to help Licorice relax before her own ceremony. Now Sanctified Petra is taken to attend her and Squale's official engagement announcement party. Licorice cannot relax around her maid, Caera, chaperoning her against being alone with a man, even one as young as Pastry. The mercenaries attack the Cathedral and escape with Pastry and Licorice. Pastry keeps Licorice from panicking and easily manipulates their guard to reveal they are employed by a noble who hates the Kadlececk's and the Hubarek's, Lord Armire, a disgraced duke stripped of his nobility. Pastry quickly teleports a message to Casserole who gathers men to storm the Armire mansion. The mercenary chief realises they kidnapped the wrong sister and won't be paid, so he decides to kill Licorice. Pastry escapes his ropes and confidently challenges him to fight.
7	"Beloved Smiles and Baked Treats"; Transliteration: "Itoshiki Egao ni Yakigashi o" (Japanese: 愛しき笑顔に焼き菓子を)	Nao Tajima	Mitsutaka Hirota	Yoshitaka Koyama	August 15, 2023
Casserole and his men invade the mansion so the chief escapes. Armire is arrested while Casserole and Pastry pursue the chief whom Pastry easily defeats, having magically sabotaged his sword back when they were still tied up. One month later Squale and Petra's engagement is made public. Pastry privately confronts Lord Kadlececk on the implausibility of mercenaries kidnapping Licorice so easily, unless they received secret assistance from someone with an interest in seeing Armire dealt with for good. Kadleck, who was that very someone, is surprised by Pastry's figuring out his scheme but admits it was wrong to put Licorice in danger and agrees to finance improvements to Casseroles farmlands in exchange for Pastry's silence. Lord Hubareck is able to sneakily outmanoeuvre a panicking Pastry into agreeing to marry Licorice, leaving Casserole aghast. Kadlececk, thoroughly amused by Pastry's predicament, gets petty revenge by announcing the engagement throughout the kingdom. Licorice is thrilled by the engagement and Pastry decides to make her as happy as he can. Knowing his fondness for sweets Licorice presents him cookies she made herself which Pastry forces himself to eat, concealing from her that she must have mistakenly used salt instead of sugar.
8	"Honey for Sweets, and a Reservoir for the Villages"; Transliteration: "Okashi ni Hachimitsu, Mura ni Chosuichi" (Japanese: お菓子に蜂蜜、村に貯水池)	Masahiko Watanabe	Mitsutaka Hirota	Yūichi Satō	August 22, 2023
Casserole risks his life telling Agnes Pastry is suddenly engaged. Brioche is furious at Lord Hubarek; by marrying one daughter to Squale and another daughter to Pastry he is blatantly trying to gain enough political influence to surpass her. Pastry receives Black-Locust saplings from Lord Kadlececk, trees that survive in poor soil and produce nectar, a substitute for honey. Pastry plans to construct reservoirs to store rainwater. Casserole is thrilled thanks to Pastry his farms are in profit for the first time. His joy is short lived when he learns Pastry is up to something drastic again. Using Drill, a tunnelling spell copied from the mercenary chief, Pastry digs three vast reservoirs. Casserole is furious Pastry flattened one of his mountains to do so and punishes not only Pastry, but Marc and Lumi too. Brioche has no daughter to marry Pastry and is too old to marry him herself, so she plots something else instead. Pastry's reservoirs collect so much rain the village constructs permanent canals to irrigate their farms and Pastry's trees. Brioche invites Pastry to a tea party with obvious ulterior motives. Casserole announces Licorice is moving in with them so she can get to know Pastry and her future in-laws.
9	"Sweet or Bitter? The Tea Tasting Ceremony"; Transliteration: "Amai ka Nigai ka? Shincha Shiin-kai" (Japanese: 甘いか苦いか？新茶試飲会)	Kōichirō Kuroda	Mitsutaka Hirota	Takaaki Ishiyama	August 29, 2023
Lord Hubareck, certain Brioche has illicit plans for Pastry, hopes Licorice being by Pastry's side at the tea party will deter these plans. Pastry shows Licorice he is making honey flavoured sweets for the party; his excitement making her love him even more. A spying Agnes and Josephine are frustrated Pastry is focusing on sweets instead of Licorice. At the party, which is mostly young nobles seeking marriage partners, Pastry's sweets are a success. Their popularity prompts Pastry to propose regular trade between Casserole and other nobles, but only if their trades are exempted from the extortionate sugar tax. Concerning such trade negotiations Brioche draws Pastry away for a private conversation, leaving Licorice with Caera and guard Nico. Pastry plans to produce sugar from Casserole's farms within three years, a bold and highly profitable goal, so Brioche grants him use of her coastal ports for shipping his sweets but still cannot guess what his true goal is. In Pastry's absence Licorice overhear gossiping nobles and fears Pastry might soon abandon her for a nobler bride, and tries to leave the party upset. Brioche asks Pastry if he loves Licorice, flustering him enough she easily traps him in a hug, just as Licorice enters and sees them.
10	"Apples of Love and Sad Threats of War"; Transliteration: "Ai no Ringo to Kanashiki Sen'un" (Japanese: 愛の林檎と悲しき戦雲)	Seo Hye-Jin	Mitsutaka Hirota	Shigeru Kimiya	September 5, 2023
Licorice runs away, which amuses Brioche. Licorice tearfully regrets not being more like Petra, able to stand up to bullies. Pastry assures her it is okay not to be Petra, but herself. After giving her a toffee apple, they almost kiss but are interrupted by a disapproving Caera. They return home where as petty revenge for upsetting Licorice Pastry uses pictures of Brioche grabbing him as wrappers for his sweets, which are then shipped to all his customers. As a result rumours spread the humiliated Brioche likes younger men and begins receiving marriage proposals from nobles as young as eight to ten. Hubareck's enemy Margrave Lutoroute is furious at Petra's engagement to Squale and decides to invade Hubareck's land with 30,000 men to settle their rivalry before Petra can marry into the Kadlececk family. Pastry plans to purchase goats and chickens for milk and eggs. He also plans to produce sugar from sweet grass. His first attempt to build a sugar extracting machine fails, so Licorice points out he would get the result he wants from a grape press used in winemaking. Pastry rushes to ask Casserole to buy a grape press but is informed the rivalry between Hubareck, Lutoroute and their various allies has caused civil war throughout the kingdom.
11	"Reinforcements and a Bittersweet First Deployment"; Transliteration: "Engun to Horonigai Uijin" (Japanese: 援軍とほろ苦い初陣)	Keisuke Ōnishi	Mitsutaka Hirota	Masafumi Satō	September 12, 2023
Lutoroute, assuming the war has strained the alliance between Hubareck and Kadlececk, decides to deepen their conflict by targeting Squale, since his death as Petra's fiancé and Kadlececk's heir will be devastating to both families. As there is nothing he can do himself Pastry focuses on the farms but learns the noble Baron Lunzvage forcibly bought his goats from the trader before they could be delivered. Lunzvage is notorious for bullying less noble families, but due to the war requiring food supplies it is not practical to lodge a complaint over mis-sold goats. Pastry and Casserole realise they can get the goats back and help the war by volunteering as reinforcements for Hubareck, gaining priority access to war supplies, and depart to the front lines. As a noble Squale does the honourable thing and joins the front line as well but is sent to a less dangerous area by Hubareck to ensure his survival. Lutoroute, having predicted this, sends a large force to wait for Squale. Casserole and Pastry also figure this out and arrive just in time to save Squale from the ambush.
12	"The Flavor of Consolation: Tarte Tatin"; Transliteration: "Nagusame no Aji: Taruto Tatan" (Japanese: 慰めの味タルト・タタン)	Naoyuki Kuzuya	Mitsutaka Hirota	Naoyuki Kuzuya	September 19, 2023
Lutoroute learns of Squale's survival and, fearing Kadlececk might decide to get involved even though Petra hasn't married Squale yet, is forced to retreat. Squale is deeply affected by his first experience of death and isolates himself in depression. Recalling Pastry helped Marc with his depression, Casserole asks Pastry to help. Squale is plagued by guilt over his men who died. At the victory ball, Pastry presents Tarte Tatin, a dessert made with baked bonkas. Pastry explains the dessert was originally created by mistake and yet was a success anyway. Squale realises just because he made mistakes does not mean he failed; the battle was won and he returned to Petra safely. Hubareck offers Pastry a reward, leading to Pastry receiving his goats, along with horses and supplies that should have been sent to Lunzvage, and even the wine press Pastry wanted. Licorice is invited to the Royal Capital with Petra so Pastry is immediately dispatched to the city to order a dress for Licorice suitable for the occasion. With access to goat milk and sugar Pastry makes Licorice a cheesecake, and with the extra supplies from Hubareck he is able to begin experimenting with different types of fruit.

=== Video game ===
In May 2023, the G123 service announced that a simulation video game adaptation based on the series titled Sweet Reincarnation: Pastries Utopia (おかしな転生 スイートユートピア, Okashi na Tensei: Suīto Yūtopia), was released.

== See also ==
- The Saint's Magic Power Is Omnipotent – A light novel series with the same illustrator
