= List of We Never Learn chapters =

We Never Learn is a Japanese manga series written and illustrated by Taishi Tsutsui. It was launched in the 10th issue of Shueisha's Weekly Shōnen Jump magazine on February 6, 2017. Viz Media announced their license of the manga for English release in North America in April 2017, and serialized it digitally in their Weekly Shonen Jump magazine. The series concluded with 187 chapters in total, collected in 21 tankōbon volumes; the final five volumes each depict an alternative ending.

== Volumes ==
No.	Title	Original release date	English release date
1	Genius and [x] Are Two Sides of the Same Coin; Tensai to [X] wa hyōriittaidearu (天才と[X]は表裏一体である)	June 2, 2017; 978-4-08-881111-6	December 4, 2018; 978-1-9747-0302-9
1. "Genius and [X] Are Two Sides of the Same Coin" (天才と[X]は表裏一体である, Tensai to [X] wa hyōriittaidearu); 2. "A Genius's Yearning Is [X]" (天才の憧憬は[X]である, Tensai no dōkei wa [X] dearu); 3. "When Geniuses Make a House Call, [X] Is of Utmost Importance" (天才の来訪は[X]の一大事である, Tensai no raihō wa [X] no ichidaijidearu); 4. "A Fish Is to Water as a Genius Is to [X]" (魚心あれば、天才に[X]心あり。, Uogokoro areba, tensai ni [X] kokoro ari.); 5. "The Pathos of a Celebrated Genius Is [X]" (高嶺の天才は[X]に憂う, Takane no tensai wa [X] ni ureu); 6. "A Genius's Conception of Modern Technology Is [X]" (天才は[X]によって文明を思案する, Tensai wa [X] ni yotte bunmei o shian suru); 7. "Therefore, a Genius Enjoys [X]" (かくして天才どもは[X]を楽しむ, Kakushite tensai-domo wa [X] o tanoshimu)
2	A Genius in the Forest Strays for [X] Tensai wa [X] ni mo kokoro tsūzuru mono to shiru (天才は[X]にも心通ずるものと知る)	August 4, 2017; 978-4-08-881195-6	February 5, 2019; 978-1-9747-0301-2
8. "Who Does a Genius Wrestle with [X] For?" (誰が為に天才は[X]に抗う, Daregatame ni tensai wa [X] ni aragau); 9. "A Genius Resonates Emotionally with [X]?" (天才は[X]にも心通ずるものと知る, Tensai wa [X] ni mo kokoro tsūzuru mono to shiru); 10. "The Maiden Genius's Day Is [X]" (それは乙女なる天才の[X]なる一日である, Sore wa otomenaru tensai no [X] naru tsuitachidearu); 11. "Said Value to a Genius Is a Consequence of [X]" (かの数値は天才による[X]の応報である, Kano sūchi wa tensai ni yoru [X] no ōhōdearu); 12. "What She Wants from a Genius Is [X]" (彼女が天才に望むもの即ち[X]である, Kanojo ga tensai ni nozomu mono sunawachi [X] dearu); 13. "Sometimes a Genius's Panic Is Inversely Related to [X]" (天才の焦燥は時に[X]反比例する, Tensai no shōsō wa tokini [X] hanpirei suru); 14. "A Genius in the Forest Is Strayed by [X]" (林間の天才は[X]に迷走する, Rinkan no tensai wa [X] ni meisō suru); 15. "A Genius Boiled in Bathwater Exposes [X]" (浴場にうだる天才は[X]をさらける, Yokujō ni udaru tensai wa [X] o sarakeru); 16. "Thus, a Predecessor Still Relates to a Genius as [X]" (かくして前任者は天才を未だ[X]する, Kakushite zen'nin-sha wa tensai o imada [X] suru)
3	Thus, [X] Geniuses Never Learn; Tensai x tachi wa kakushite benkyō ga dekinai (天才xたちはかくして勉強ができない)	October 4, 2017; 978-4-08-881214-4	April 2, 2019; 978-1-9747-0299-2
17. "Youth Is a Genius's Drive, Vehicle and [X]" (青春とは天才の熱意と車輪と[X]である, Seishun to wa tensai no netsui to sharin to [X] dearu); 18. "Thus, [X] Geniuses Never Learn!" (天才xたちはかくして勉強ができない, Tensai x tachi wa kakushite benkyō ga dekinai); 19. "A Genius and [X] Take the Weather for Granted" (天才とxは互いの空模様を思い做す, Tensai to x wa tagai no soramoyō o omoi nasu); 20. "A Genius Is Swayed by [X] in a Blurry World" (天才は不鮮明な世界のxにたゆとう, Tensai wa fusenmeina sekai no x ni tayutō); 21. "The Forbidden Item That Connects an [X] Genius" (それはxの天才と繋がる禁断のものである, Sore wa x no tensai to tsunagaru kindan no mono de aru); 22. "A Former Tutor's Secret Spot Is [X]" (前任者の秘匿領域はxな有様である, Zennin-sha no hitoku ryōiki wa x na arisama de aru); 23. "[X] Is Indispensable in a Genius's Flower Garden" (天才たちの花園にxは不可欠である, Tensai tachi no Hanazono ni x wa fukaketsu de aru); 24. "A Dauntless Genius Struggles Against Rumors of [X]" (果敢なる天才はxの流説に抗う, Kakan naru tensai wa x no ryūsetsu ni aragau); 25. "It All Begins with a Genius's Struggle with [X]" (事の発端は天才のxなる敢闘である, Koto no hottan wa tensai no x naru kantō de aru)
4	A Lost Lamb in New Territory Encounters [X] Kano shin tenchi ni mayoe ru kohitsuji wa x to kaikō suru (かの新天地に迷える子羊はxと邂逅する)	December 4, 2017; 978-4-08-881289-2	June 4, 2019; 978-1-9747-0300-5
26. "Sometimes a Genius's Every Action Is at the Mercy of [X]" (天才の一挙手一投足は時に[x]を翻弄する, Tensai no ichi kyoshu ichi tōsoku wa toki ni [x] o honrō suru); 27. "A Genius Is Frightened of the Horrible [X], While He Ponders Over It" (怖じる[x]に天才は憂い彼は虜る, Ojiru [x] ni tensai wa ui kare wa toriko ru); 28. "He Struggles with [X] in a Forbidden Zone" (禁断の地にて彼は[x]が為奮闘する, Kindan no chi nite kare wa [x] ga tame funtō suru); 29. "A Genius Reaches [X] After an Exhaustive Search" (天才は飽くなき探究の末[x]に至る, Tensai wa aku naki tankyū no sue [x] ni itaru); 30. "A Genius Is Avidly Dedicated to the Investigation of [X]" (されどなお天才は[x]の究明に勤しむ, Saredo nao tensai wa [x] no kyūmei ni isoshimu); 31. "A Lost Lamb in New Territory Encounters [X]" (かの新天地に迷える子羊はxと邂逅する, Kano shin tenchi ni mayoe ru kohitsuji wa x to kaikō suru); 32. "An Elder Sees an [X] Future with Naïve Honesty" (先人はかくも愚直に[x]な明日を見る, Senjin hakaku mo guchoku ni [x] na asu o miru); 33. "Geniuses and a Predecessor Cause Mental Anguish for [X]" (天才と先人寄れば[x]の懊悩となる, STensai to senjin yore ba [x] no ōnō to naru); 34. "An Illustrious Veteran Sometimes Serves [X]" (威厳ある前任者は時に[x]にかしづく, Igen aru zennin-sha wa toki ni [x] ni kashizuku)
5	On a Clamorous Night, [X] Cannot Study; Kenken taru yoru ni hatashite [x] wa benkyō ga dekinai (喧々たる夜に果たして[x]は勉強ができない)	February 2, 2018; 978-4-08-881342-4	August 6, 2019; 978-1-9747-0444-6
35. "A Genius Secretly Dances to the Foolery of [X]" (人知れず天才は[x]どもの戯言に踊る, Hito shirezu tensai wa [x] domo no zaregoto ni odoru); 36. "Sometimes Poignant Solitude and [X] Can Be the Downfall of a Genius" (時に天才は[x]に憂い孤独に仇をなす, Toki ni tensai wa [x] ni urei kodoku ni ada o nasu); 37. "Sometimes Geniuses Are Subject to the Domino Effect of [X]" (時に天才どもが砂上の[x]は連鎖, Toki ni tensai domo ga sajō no [x] wa rensa); 38. "On a Clamorous Night, [X] Cannot Study" (喧々たる夜に果たして[x]は勉強ができない, Kenken taru yoru ni hatashite [x] wa benkyō ga dekinai); 39. "The Light in a Genius's Eye Is All [X]" (天の光はすべて[x]である, Ten no hikari wa subete [x] de aru); 40. "An Elder Faces Her Own Choice with [X]" (先人は己の選択に[x]をもって向き合う, Senjin wa onore no sentaku ni [x] o motte mukiau); 41. "At Times, the Vision of an Elder Leads Back to Young [X]" (前任者の姿は時に青き[x]へ遡行する, Zennin-sha no sugata wa toki ni aoki [x] e sokō suru); 42. "A Genius and the Surface of the Water Reflect Only [X]" (水面駆ける天才は唯々[x]に映ゆ, Suimen kakeru tensai wa tadatada [x] ni ei yu)
6	Blooming in the Hot Spring Water Are Traces of a Genius's [X] Yunohana ni saku wa tensai-domo ga [x] no ato de aru (湯の花に咲くは天才どもが[x]の跡である)	May 2, 2018; 978-4-08-881414-8	October 1, 2019; 978-1-9747-0488-0
43. "Sometimes a Genius Travels Down Memory Lane with [X]" (天才は時に[x]をともに分かち追懐する, Tensai wa toki ni [x] o tomo ni wakachi tsuikai suru); 44. "He and a Genius Each Consider a Decision Pertaining to [X]" (天才と彼はその[x]なる判定に銘々慮る, Tensai to kare wa sono [x] naru hantei ni meimei omonpakaru); 45. "Her [X] Is a Bolt from the Blue for a Predecessor" (彼女の[x]は前任者にとって青天霹靂である, Kanojo no [x] wa zennin-sha ni totte seiten hekireki de aru); 46. "Her Feminine Wiles [X] Him" (彼女はかくも妖姿媚態に彼を[x]する, Kanojo wa kaku mo ayakashi sugata bitai ni kare o [X] suru); 47. "An Oblivious [X] Glimpses the Depths of the Abyss" (露知らず[x]はその深淵をのぞかれるものである, Tsuyu shirazu [x] wa sono shinen o nozokareru mono de aru); 48. "An Elder Is Vividly [X] When an Item Is Lost to the Sea" (渚に失せものありで先人は艶然と [x] する, Nagisa ni use mo no aride senjin wa enzen to [x] suru); 49. "The Only Thing That Engenders [X] When an Elder Experiences a Close Call" (それは九死の前任者に唯一[x]させるものである, Sore wa kyūshi no zennin-sha ni yuiitsu [x] saseru mono de aru); 50. "Blooming in the Hot Spring Water Are Traces of the Geniuses' [X]" (湯の花に咲くは天才どもが[x]の跡である, Yunohana ni saku wa tensai-domo ga [x] no ato de aru); 51. "With the Changing Seasons, a Genius Experiences the Sorrow of [X]" (天才は変遷する季節[x]模様に憂う, Tensai wa hensen suru kisetsu [x] moyō ni ureu)
7	They Express Words of [X] as a Diversion; Karera wa tawamure ni [x] naru koto no ha o hirekisuru (彼らは戯れに「x」なる言の葉を披瀝する)	July 4, 2018; 978-4-08-881510-7	December 3, 2019; 978-1-9747-0489-7
52. "Sometimes a Genius Pursues the Investigation of an Ignorant [X]" (天才は時に蒙昧たる[X]の究明に邁進する, Tensai wa toki ni mōmai taru [X] no kyūmei ni maishin suru); 53. "Sometimes the Proximal [X] Is Green and Quick" (時に隣の[x]は青く捗捗しいものである, Toki ni tonari no [x] wa aoku hakabakashī mono de aru); 54. "At Times, an Elder's Pride Is in Direct Opposition to [X]'s Circumstances" (時には、長老の誇りはXの状況に直接反対, Tokiniha, chōrō no hokori wa [x] no jōkyō ni chokusetsuhantai); 55. "They Express Words of [X] as a Diversion" (彼らは戯れに「x」なる言の葉を披瀝する, Karera wa tawamure ni [x] naru koto no ha o hirekisuru); 56. "Sometimes Fate Leads a Predecessor to Wrestle with [X]" (運命は時に前任者を抗えめ「x」へといざなう, Unmei wa toki ni zenninsha o aragaeme [x] heto izanaou); 57. "A Genius's New Look Lands in [X]'s Blind Spot" (天才の変貌は時に「x」の盲目となる, Tensai no hengou ha toki ni [x] no moumoku tonaru); 58. "On a Stormy Night, a Genius's Heart Isn't in [X]" (荒ぶる夜たまさかに天才の心「x」に在らず, Araburu yoru tamasaka ni tensai no kokoro [x] ni arazu); 59. "Sometimes a Genius Struggles With a Limited [X]" (時に天才は限定された「x」において奮闘する, Toki ni tensai wa genteisareta [x] ni oite funtousuru); 60. "Sometimes a Predecessor's [X] Becomes His Sacrifice" (先人の「x」は時に彼の献身となる, Senjin no [x] wa toki ni kare no kenshin tonaru)
8	As the Festival Unfolds Mysteriously, [X] Dance in Full Splendor; Matsuri no yukue wa izashirazu [X]-domo wa hanayaka ni mau (祭の行方はいざ知らず「x」どもは華やかに舞う)	September 4, 2018; 978-4-08-881564-0	February 4, 2020; 978-1-97-470490-3
61. "Wherefore Might They Fathom the Aspirations of the Immediate [X]" (彼らは安んぞ面する「x」の志を知らんや, Karera wa izukunzo mensuru [X] no kokorozashi o shiran ya); 62. "A Best Friend Illustrates [X] for a Genius" (親友が天才に描くもの即ち「x」である, Shin'yū ga tensai ni egaku mono sunawachi [X] dearu); 63. "After a Dream, [X] Responds to a Certain Form" (その姿に想起するは「x」どもが夢のあとである, Sono sugata ni sōki suru wa [X]-domo ga yumenoatodearu); 64. "Excitement and Busyness in Anticipation of [X]" (誰しも「x」の前は忙しなく期待を胸に奔走する, Dareshimo [X] mae wa sewashinaku Kitai o mune ni honsō suru); 65. "[X] Descends Like Wildfire at the Festival's Beginning" (祭のはじめは矢継ぎ早彼らに「x」が降りかかる, Matsuri no hajime wa yatsugibaya Karera ni [X] ga furikakaru); 66. "As the Festival Unfolds Mysteriously, [X] Dance in Full Splendor" (祭の行方はいざ知らず「x」どもは華やかに舞う, Matsuri no yukue wa izashirazu [X]-domo wa hanayaka ni mau); 67. "[X] Treads a Thorny Path as the Festivities Continue..." (祭の騒ぎは留まらず「x」どもは茨の道を往く, Matsuri no sawagi wa todomarazu [X]-domo wa ibara no michi o yuku); 68. "At the Festival's Climax, Each Frantically Strives for [X]" (祭の佳境はめいめいに「x」を求め空騒ぐ, Matsuri no kakyō wa meimei ni [X] o motome kara sawagu); 69. "A Post-Festival Celebration of [X], Both Dazzling And Lonely" (祭の終わりは寂しくも華やかに「x」どもを祝福する, Matsuri no owari wa sabishiku mo hanayaka ni [X]-domo o shukufuku suru)
9	The Flow of [X] Never Ends... Yuku [X] no nagare wa taezu shite... (ゆく「x」の流れは絶えずして。。。)	December 4, 2018; 978-4-08-881646-3	April 7, 2020; 978-1-97-470951-9
70. "Sometimes a Mysterious Palpitation Derives From [X]" (その奇怪な早鐘は時に「x」に因るものである, Sono kikaina hayagane wa tokini [X] ni yoru monodearu); 71. "However, a Predecessor Is Swayed by a Certain [X]" (さりとて先人も一分の「x」に揺らぐものである, Saritote senjin mo ichi-bun no [X] ni yuragu monodearu); 72. "Its Marks Sometimes Disturb the Stability of [X]" (その痕跡は時に「x」の安寧を揺るがすものである, Sono konseki wa tokini [X] no annei o yurugasu monodearu); 73. "A Genius's Questions Cleverly Become the Battle of the [X]" (天才の質疑はいみじくも「x」どもの攻防となる, Tensai no shitsugi wa imijikumo [X]-domo no kōbō to naru); 74. "Sometimes a Predecessor Experiences Formidable [X]s" (時に前任者は艱難たる「x」にも閲するものである, Tokini zennin-sha wa kannantaru [X] ni mo essuru monodearu); 75. "Sometimes a Mechanical Girl Serves [X]" (機械仕掛けの彼女は時に「x」にかしずくものである, Kikai shikake no kanojo wa tokini [X] ni kashizuku monodearu); 76. "The Flow of [X] Never Ends..." (ゆく「x」の流れは絶えずして。。。, Yuku [X] no nagare wa taezu shite...); 77. "At Times a Murky Sensation Waxes or Wanes and Settles in [X]" (時によどみのうたかたはかつ消えかつ結びて「x」にとどまる, Tokini yodomi no utakata wa katsu kie katsu musubite [X] ni todomaru); 78. "A Heartfelt Gift Sometimes Becomes a Complicated [X]" (心尽くしの賜物は時に「x」の錯綜となる, Kokorozukushi no tamamono wa tokini [X] no sakusō to naru)
10	An [X]'s Joke Makes a Genius Dance; Mata shite mo tensai wa [X]-domo no zaregoto ni odoru (またしても天才は「x」どもの戯言に踊る)	February 4, 2019; 978-4-08-881724-8	June 2, 2020; 978-1-97-471239-7
79. "He Struggles Again Due to [X] at a New Location" (癒しの新天地にて彼は再び「x」が為奮闘する, Iyashino shintenchi nite kare wa futatabi [X] ga tame funtō suru); 80. "At Steam's Edge, a Disastrous [X] Increases the Predecessor's Distress" (湯煙の果て前任者は散々たる「x」にたゆたう, Yukemuri no hate zennin-sha wa sanzantaru [X] ni tayutau); 81. "A Genius Secretly Responds with [X] to Their Conjectures" (人知れず天才は彼らの忖度に「x」する, Hitoshirezu tensai wa karera no sontaku ni [X] suru); 82. "Sometimes a Detained Predecessor Struggles with the Immediate [X]" (隔絶された先人は時に目前の「x」に葛藤する, Kakuzetsu sa reta senjin wa tokini mokuzen no [X] ni kattō suru); 83. "An [X]'s Joke Makes a Genius Dance" (またしても天才は「x」どもの戯言に踊る, Mata shite mo tensai wa [X]-domo no zaregoto ni odoru); 84. "A Certain Book Alludes to a Predecessor's [X]" (かの書物は前任者の[x]を諷示するものである, Kano shomotsu wa zennin-sha no [X] o fūji suru monodearu); 85. "The Star of Ultimate Love and the Name of [X], Part 1" (最愛の星に「x」の名を①, Saiai no hoshi ni [X] no na o ①); 86. "The Star of Ultimate Love and the Name of [X], Part 2" (最愛の星に「x」の名を②, Saiai no hoshi ni [X] no na o ②); 87. "The Star of Ultimate Love and the Name of [X], Part 3" (最愛の星に「x」の名を③, Saiai no hoshi ni [X] no na o ③)
11	The Star of Ultimate Love and the Name of [X] Saiai no hoshi ni [X] no na o (最愛の星に「x」の名を)	April 4, 2019; 978-4-08-881798-9	August 4, 2020; 978-1-97-471240-3
88. "The Star of Ultimate Love and the Name of [X], Part 4" (最愛の星に「x」の名を④, Saiai no hoshi ni [X] no na o ④); 89. "The Star of Ultimate Love and the Name of [X], Part 5" (最愛の星に「x」の名を⑤, Saiai no hoshi ni [X] no na o ⑤); 90. "Sometimes a Genius Engages in Nonsense [X] by the Water" (汀の天才は時に嘯きながらも「x」する, Migiwa no tensai wa tokini usobukinagara mo [X] suru); 91. "In the Shadow of Geniuses, [X] Inadvertently Opens Up" (天才どもの英姿にかくして「x」は朦朧と言い洩らす, Tensai-domo no eishi ni kakushite [X] wa mōrō to ii morasu); 92. "Sometimes a Genius Primes the Pump for [X]" (時に天才はよかれと「x」に呼び水をさす, Tokini tensai wa yokare to [X] ni yobimizu o sasu); 93. "A Predecessor Knowingly Raises an Unprecedented [X]" (前任者は賢しらに未曾有の「x」を育む, Zennin-sha wa sakashira ni mizouno [X] o hagukumu); 94. "Sometimes a Predecessor Does [X] to a Beloved Object" (時に先人は愛しきその姿に「x」を重ねる, Tokini senjin wa itoshiki sono sugata ni [X] o kasaneru); 95. "He Has a Flash of Enlightenment and Sprints Forth to [X]" (そうして彼は頓悟して「x」が為に走り出す, Sōshite kare wa tongo shite [X] ga tame ni hashiridasu); 96. "Geniuses Secretly [X] in Response to His Hurried Busied State" (怱々たる彼の様に天才どもは隠密に「x」する, Sōsōtaru kare no sama ni tensai-domo wa onmitsu ni [X] suru)
12	The Ice Flower Dances with [X] at Twilight; Tasogare ni kōri no hana wa [X] to mau (黄昏に氷の華は[X]と舞う)	June 4, 2019; 978-4-08-881866-5	October 6, 2020; 978-19-7471260-1
97. "The Silence of Absence Aptly Becomes the Geniuses' [X]" (不在の森関はいみじくも天才どもの[X]となる, Fuzai no shinkan wa imijikumo tensai-domo no [X] to naru); 98. "Sometimes a Tome Lures Them to the [X] of Seduction" (かの章編は時に彼らを蠱惑の[X]へと誘う, Kano shō-hen wa tokini karera o kowaku no [X] e to izanau); 99. "Nonetheless, a Predecessor Imitates [X]'s Appearance Anticipating Tomorrow" (さりとて先人は[X]の形振りを倣い明日を見る, Saritote senjin wa [X] no narifuri o narai ashita o miru); 100. "The Ice Flower Dances with [X] at Twilight, Part 1" (黄昏に氷の華は[X]と舞う①, Tasogare ni kōri no hana wa [X] to mau ①); 101. "The Ice Flower Dances with [X] at Twilight, Part 2" (黄昏に氷の華は[X]と舞う②, Tasogare ni kōri no hana wa [X] to mau ②); 102. "The Ice Flower Dances with [X] at Twilight, Part 3" (黄昏に氷の華は[X]と舞う③, Tasogare ni kōri no hana wa [X] to mau ③); 103. "Said Association Sometimes Causes Her to [X]" (その連接は時に彼女を[X]させるものである, Sono rensetsu wa tokini kanojo o [X] sa seru monodearu); 104. "A Little Pale Pink Evokes Memories of [X]" (薄紅の粧しは時にかつての[X]を喚び起こす, Usubeni no mekashi wa tokini katsute no [X] o yobi okosu); 105. "A Maiden's Invitation Inadvertently Reflects [X]" (乙女の招きはたまさかに[X]の鏡鑑となる, Otome no maneki wa tamasaka ni [X] no kyōkan to naru)
13	Spirits on the Sand Draw Tomorrow's [X] Sajō no yōsei wa [X] ni asu o kaku (砂上の妖精は[X]に明日を描く)	September 4, 2019; 978-4-08-882021-7	December 1, 2020; 978-19-7471725-5
106. "A Visit Is a Crisis for the [X]" (その来訪は果たして[X]どもの一大事である, Sono raihō wa hatashite [X]-domo no ichidaijidearu); 107. "Spirits on the Sand Draw Tomorrow's [X], Part 1" (砂上の妖精は[X]に明日を描く①, Sajō no yōsei wa [X] ni asu o kaku ①); 108. "Spirits on the Sand Draw Tomorrow's [X], Part 2" (砂上の妖精は[X]に明日を描く②, Sajō no yōsei wa [X] ni asu o kaku ②); 109. "Spirits on the Sand Draw Tomorrow's [X], Part 3" (砂上の妖精は[X]に明日を描く③, Sajō no yōsei wa [X] ni asu o kaku ③); 110. "Spirits on the Sand Draw Tomorrow's [X], Part 4" (砂上の妖精は[X]に明日を描く④, Sajō no yōsei wa [X] ni asu o kaku ④); 111. "A Predecessor's [X] Visit Can Sometimes Turn Peculiar" (前任者のおとづろ[X]は時に奇異なるものである, Zennin-sha no otozuro [X] wa tokini kiinaru monodearu); 112. "Sometimes Worrying About the Heat and a Coat Goes Against a Well-Intentioned [X]" (熱に憂う外套は時に善意の[X]に抗う, Netsu ni ureu gaitō wa tokini zen'i no [X] ni aragau); 113. "Sometimes [X] Dances With Aspects of Fortune Telling..." (時に[X]は占卜の如何に踊るものである, Tokini [X] wa sen boku to no ikaga ni odoru monodearu); 114. "The Clockwork Fireflies Yearn for the Snow Flurries of [X], Part 1" (機械仕掛の蛍は[X]の淡雪に焦がる①, Kikai jikake no hotaru wa [X] no awayuki ni ko garu ①)
14	The Clockwork Fireflies Yearn for the Snow Flurries of [X] Kikai jikake no hotaru wa [X] no awayuki ni ko garu (機械仕掛の蛍は[X]の淡雪に焦がる)	November 1, 2019; 978-4-08-882083-5; 978-4-08-908359-8 (BD bundled version)	February 2, 2021; 978-19-7471726-2
115. "The Clockwork Fireflies Yearn for the Snow Flurries of [X], Part 2" (機械仕掛の蛍は[X]の淡雪に焦がる②, Kikai jikake no hotaru wa [X] no awayuki ni ko garu ②); 116. "The Clockwork Fireflies Yearn for the Snow Flurries of [X], Part 3" (機械仕掛の蛍は[X]の淡雪に焦がる③, Kikai jikake no hotaru wa [X] no awayuki ni ko garu ③); 117. "The Clockwork Fireflies Yearn for the Snow Flurries of [X], Part 4" (機械仕掛の蛍は[X]の淡雪に焦がる④, Kikai jikake no hotaru wa [X] no awayuki ni ko garu ④); 118. "Sometimes a Predecessor Drifts Among Mineral Deposits and [X]" (先人は時に湯花と[X]にたゆとうものである, Senjin wa tokini yubana to [X] ni tayutō monodearu); 119. "Traveling Back in Time Makes It So You Encounter a Past [X]" (時の遡行は過ぎ去りし[X]との邂逅となる, Toki no sokō wa sugisarishi [X] to no kaikō to naru); 120. "At Year's End, a Genius Leaves a Clean Trail When [X]" (年の暮 天才は[X]にて跡を濁さず, Toshi no kure tensai wa [X] nite ato o nigosazu); 121. "Sometimes a Lovable Beast Causes a Tumultuous [X]" (時に愛すべき獣は波乱と[X]をもたらすものである, Tokini aisubeki kemono wa haran to [X] o motarasu monodearu); 122. "Thus, They Quietly Celebrate [X]" (斯様に彼女らは粛々と[X]を祝す, Kayō ni kanojora wa shukushuku to [X] o shukusu); 123. "Their Thoughts Turn to the Departing Year and [X]" (詣でる彼らは過ぎ往く年と[X]に馳せる, Mōderu karera wa sugi yuku toshi to [X] ni haseru)
15	More than Ever, What Supports [X] Is... Soredemo nao [X] o sasaeru mono wa (それでも尚[X]を支えるものは)	January 4, 2020; 978-4-08-882173-3	April 6, 2021; 978-19-7471870-2
124. "Sometimes a Genius's Transformation Becomes a Great Leap in [X]" (天才の変貌は時に[X]の進境となる, Tensai no henbō wa tokini [X] no shinkyō to naru); 125. "A Young Girl's Acts of Devotion to [X]" (縁の下の少女はかくも[X]に献身する, En'noshita no shōjo wa kaku mo [X] ni kenshin suru); 126. "A Predecessor Stockpiles [X] in Anticipation of the Big Day" (先人はかの日に備え[X]を蓄積する, Senjin haka no hi ni sonae [X] o chikuseki suru); 127. "The [X]'s Face the Fateful Morning Fresh and Pure!" (楚々として[X]どもはその朝を迎える, Soso to shite [X]-domo wa sono asa o mukaeru); 128. "More than Ever, What Supports [X] Is..." (それでも尚[X]を支えるものは, Soredemo nao [X] o sasaeru mono wa); 129. "After Slushy Shenanigans, They Grow Closer to [X]" (雪解けに彼女らは戯れ[X]に寄り添う, Yukidoke ni kanojora wa tawamure [X] ni yorisou); 130. "Sometimes a Genius Still Struggles with [X]" (時に天才どもは再び親難に[X]するものである, Tokini tensai-domo wa futatabi oya-nan ni [X] suru monodearu); 131. "Sometimes Their [X] Is Flexible" (時に彼らの[X]は柔軟たるものである, Tokini karera no [X] wa jūnantaru monodearu); 132. "On the Dusky Riverbank, She Finally Rows to the [X]" (薄明に水辺の君はやがて[X]に漕ぎつく, Hakumei ni mizube no kimi wa yagate [X] ni kogi tsuku)
16	The Time of [X] Soshite [x] no toki (そして[x]の時)	April 3, 2020; 978-4-08-882253-2; 978-4-08-908376-5 (BD bundled version)	June 1, 2021; 978-1-9747-2002-6
133. "A Predecessor Enjoys the Passing [X]" (前任者はそして過ぎ去りし[x]を享受する, Zen'nin-sha wa soshite sugisarishi [x] o kyōju suru); 134. "A Predecessor's Past Is Colored by [X]" (先人のかつてはやがて[x]に色づく, Senjin no katsute wa yagate [x] ni irodzuku); 135. "Sometimes They Choose [X] in the Presence of Ogres" (時に彼らは鬼のいる間に[x]を選択する, Tokini karera wa oni no iru ma ni [x] o sentaku suru); 136. "From Slumber, They Who Awaken to [X]..." (眠りの果て[x]の現に目覚めたものは, Nemuri no hate [x] no gen'ni mezameta mono wa); 137. "Sometimes, a Maiden's Sweet Sentiments Are Connected to [X], Part 1" (乙女の甘い想いは時に[x]に連なるものである①, Otome no amai omoi wa tokini [x] ni tsuranaru monodearu ①); 138. "Sometimes, a Maiden's Sweet Sentiments Are Connected to [X], Part 2" (乙女の甘い想いは時に[x]に連なるものである②, Otome no amai omoi wa tokini [x] ni tsuranaru monodearu ②); 139. "They Learn the Final [X] Alone" (彼らはひとり最後の[x]に学ぶ, Karera wa hitori saigo no [x] ni manabu); 140. "The Time of [X]" (そして[x]の時, Soshite [x] no toki); 141. "Some Smile and Some Sob at [X], and..." (その[x]に微笑む者と咽ぶ者そして..., Sono [x] ni hohoemu mono to musebu mono soshite...)
17	The Ephemeral Mermaid Princess Sprinkles into the Promised [X] Utakata no ningyo hime wa yakusoku no [X] ni nuretsu (泡沫の人魚姫は約束の[X]に濡つ)	June 4, 2020; 978-4-08-882335-5	August 3, 2021; 978-1-9747-1528-2
142. "The Ephemeral Mermaid Princess Sprinkles into the Promised [X], Part 1" (泡沫の人魚姫は約束の[X]に濡つ①, Utakata no ningyo hime wa yakusoku no [X] ni nuretsu ①); 143. "The Ephemeral Mermaid Princess Sprinkles into the Promised [X], Part 2" (泡沫の人魚姫は約束の[X]に濡つ②, Utakata no ningyo hime wa yakusoku no [X] ni nuretsu ②); 144. "The Ephemeral Mermaid Princess Sprinkles into the Promised [X], Part 3" (泡沫の人魚姫は約束の[X]に濡つ③, Utakata no ningyo hime wa yakusoku no [X] ni nuretsu ③); 145. "The Ephemeral Mermaid Princess Sprinkles into the Promised [X], Part 4" (泡沫の人魚姫は約束の[X]に濡つ④, Utakata no ningyo hime wa yakusoku no [X] ni nuretsu ④); 146. "The Ephemeral Mermaid Princess Sprinkles into the Promised [X], Part 5" (泡沫の人魚姫は約束の[X]に濡つ⑤, Utakata no ningyo hime wa yakusoku no [X] ni nuretsu ⑤); 147. "The Ephemeral Mermaid Princess Sprinkles into the Promised [X], Part 6" (泡沫の人魚姫は約束の[X]に濡つ⑥, Utakata no ningyo hime wa yakusoku no [X] ni nuretsu ⑥); 148. "The Ephemeral Mermaid Princess Sprinkles into the Promised [X], Part 7" (泡沫の人魚姫は約束の[X]に濡つ⑦, Utakata no ningyo hime wa yakusoku no [X] ni nuretsu ⑦); 149. "The Ephemeral Mermaid Princess Sprinkles into the Promised [X], Part 8" (泡沫の人魚姫は約束の[X]に濡つ⑧, Utakata no ningyo hime wa yakusoku no [X] ni nuretsu ⑧); 150. "[X] =..." ([X]=)
18	[X] = Thumbelina Supercomputer [X] = kikai shikake no oyayubi hime-hen ([X]=機械仕掛けの親指姫編)	August 4, 2020; 978-4-08-882383-6	October 5, 2021; 978-1-9747-2292-1
151. "[X] = Thumbelina Supercomputer, Part 1" ([X]=機械仕掛けの親指姫編①, [X] = kikai shikake no oyayubi hime-hen ①); 152. "[X] = Thumbelina Supercomputer, Part 2" ([X]=機械仕掛けの親指姫編②, [X] = kikai shikake no oyayubi hime-hen ②); 153. "[X] = Thumbelina Supercomputer, Part 3" ([X]=機械仕掛けの親指姫編③, [X] = kikai shikake no oyayubi hime-hen ③); 154. "[X] = Thumbelina Supercomputer, Part 4" ([X]=機械仕掛けの親指姫編④, [X] = kikai shikake no oyayubi hime-hen ④); 155. "[X] = Thumbelina Supercomputer, Part 5" ([X]=機械仕掛けの親指姫編⑤, [X] = kikai shikake no oyayubi hime-hen ⑤); 156. "[X] = Thumbelina Supercomputer, Part 6" ([X]=機械仕掛けの親指姫編⑥, [X] = kikai shikake no oyayubi hime-hen ⑥); 157. "[X] = Thumbelina Supercomputer, Part 7" ([X]=機械仕掛けの親指姫編⑦, [X] = kikai shikake no oyayubi hime-hen ⑦); 158. "[X] = Thumbelina Supercomputer, Part 8" ([X]=機械仕掛けの親指姫編⑧, [X] = kikai shikake no oyayubi hime-hen ⑧); 159. "[X] = Thumbelina Supercomputer, Part 9" ([X]=機械仕掛けの親指姫編⑨, [X] = kikai shikake no oyayubi hime-hen ⑨)
19	[X] = Sleeping Beauty of the Literary Forest [X] = bungaku no mori no nemuri hime-hen ([X]=文学の森の眠り姫編)	October 2, 2020; 978-4-08-882430-7	December 7, 2021; 978-1-9747-2345-4
160. "[X] = Sleeping Beauty of the Literary Forest, Part 1" ([X]=文学の森の眠り姫編①, [X] = bungaku no mori no nemuri hime-hen ①); 161. "[X] = Sleeping Beauty of the Literary Forest, Part 2" ([X]=文学の森の眠り姫編②, [X] = bungaku no mori no nemuri hime-hen ②); 162. "[X] = Sleeping Beauty of the Literary Forest, Part 3" ([X]=文学の森の眠り姫編③, [X] = bungaku no mori no nemuri hime-hen ③); 163. "[X] = Sleeping Beauty of the Literary Forest, Part 4" ([X]=文学の森の眠り姫編④, [X] = bungaku no mori no nemuri hime-hen ④); 164. "[X] = Sleeping Beauty of the Literary Forest, Part 5" ([X]=文学の森の眠り姫編⑤, [X] = bungaku no mori no nemuri hime-hen ⑤); 165. "[X] = Sleeping Beauty of the Literary Forest, Part 6" ([X]=文学の森の眠り姫編⑥, [X] = bungaku no mori no nemuri hime-hen ⑥); 166. "[X] = Sleeping Beauty of the Literary Forest, Part 7" ([X]=文学の森の眠り姫編⑦, [X] = bungaku no mori no nemuri hime-hen ⑦); 167. "[X] = Sleeping Beauty of the Literary Forest, Part 8" ([X]=文学の森の眠り姫編⑧, [X] = bungaku no mori no nemuri hime-hen ⑧); 168. "[X] = Sleeping Beauty of the Literary Forest, Part 9" ([X]=文学の森の眠り姫編⑨, [X] = bungaku no mori no nemuri hime-hen ⑨)
20	[X] = Tomorrow Night's Pixie [X] = ashita no yoru no ko yōsei-hen ([X]=明日の夜の小妖精編)	January 4, 2021; 978-4-08-882530-4; 978-4-08-908397-0 (CD bundled version)	February 1, 2022; 978-1-9747-2538-0
169. "[X] = Tomorrow Night's Pixie, Part 1" ([X]=明日の夜の小妖精編①, [X] = ashita no yoru no ko yōsei-hen ①); 170. "[X] = Tomorrow Night's Pixie, Part 2" ([X]=明日の夜の小妖精編②, [X] = ashita no yoru no ko yōsei-hen ②); 171. "[X] = Tomorrow Night's Pixie, Part 3" ([X]=明日の夜の小妖精編③, [X] = ashita no yoru no ko yōsei-hen ③); 172. "[X] = Tomorrow Night's Pixie, Part 4" ([X]=明日の夜の小妖精編④, [X] = ashita no yoru no ko yōsei-hen ④); 173. "[X] = Tomorrow Night's Pixie, Part 5" ([X]=明日の夜の小妖精編⑤, [X] = ashita no yoru no ko yōsei-hen ⑤); 174. "[X] = Tomorrow Night's Pixie, Part 6" ([X]=明日の夜の小妖精編⑥, [X] = ashita no yoru no ko yōsei-hen ⑥); 175. "[X] = Tomorrow Night's Pixie, Part 7" ([X]=明日の夜の小妖精編⑦, [X] = ashita no yoru no ko yōsei-hen ⑦); 176. "[X] = Tomorrow Night's Pixie, Part 8" ([X]=明日の夜の小妖精編⑧, [X] = ashita no yoru no ko yōsei-hen ⑧); 177. "[X] = Tomorrow Night's Pixie, Part 9" ([X]=明日の夜の小妖精編⑨, [X] = ashita no yoru no ko yōsei-hen ⑨)
21	[X] = The Queen of Thin Ice [X] = hakuhyō no joō-hen ([X]=薄氷の女王編)	March 4, 2021; 978-4-08-882577-9; 978-4-08-908398-7 (CD bundled version)	May 17, 2022; 978-1-9747-2709-4
178. "[X] = The Queen of Thin Ice, Part 1" ([X]=薄氷の女王編①, [X] = hakuhyō no joō-hen ①); 179. "[X] = The Queen of Thin Ice, Part 2" ([X]=薄氷の女王編②, [X] = hakuhyō no joō-hen ②); 180. "[X] = The Queen of Thin Ice, Part 3" ([X]=薄氷の女王編③, [X] = hakuhyō no joō-hen ③); 181. "[X] = The Queen of Thin Ice, Part 4" ([X]=薄氷の女王編④, [X] = hakuhyō no joō-hen ④); 182. "[X] = The Queen of Thin Ice, Part 5" ([X]=薄氷の女王編⑤, [X] = hakuhyō no joō-hen ⑤); 183. "[X] = The Queen of Thin Ice, Part 6" ([X]=薄氷の女王編⑥, [X] = hakuhyō no joō-hen ⑥); 184. "[X] = The Queen of Thin Ice, Part 7" ([X]=薄氷の女王編⑦, [X] = hakuhyō no joō-hen ⑦); 185. "[X] = The Queen of Thin Ice, Part 8" ([X]=薄氷の女王編⑧, [X] = hakuhyō no joō-hen ⑧); 186. "[X] = The Queen of Thin Ice, Part 9" ([X]=薄氷の女王編⑨, [X] = hakuhyō no joō-hen ⑨); 187. "An [X] Future..." ([X]なる未来へ, [X] naru mirai e)
