= Monster Girl Doctor =

Japanese light novel series and its franchise

- Cover of the first light novel volume of Monster Girl Doctor, featuring Saphentite "Sapphee" Neikes

モンスター娘のお医者さん (Monsutā Musume no Oisha-san)
- Genre: Fantasy comedy; Harem
- Light novel
- Written by: Yoshino Origuchi
- Illustrated by: Z-Ton
- Published by: Shueisha
- English publisher: NA: Seven Seas Entertainment
- Imprint: Dash X Bunko
- Original run: June 24, 2016 – March 25, 2022
- Volumes: 10
- Manga
- Written by: Yoshino Origuchi
- Illustrated by: Tetsumaki Tomasu
- Published by: Tokuma Shoten
- Magazine: Comic Ryū Web
- Original run: February 26, 2018 – December 20, 2019
- Volumes: 2
- Anime television series
- Directed by: Yoshiaki Iwasaki
- Written by: Hideki Shirane
- Music by: TO-MAS
- Studio: Arvo Animation
- Licensed by: Crunchyroll (streaming); NA: Sentai Filmworks (home video); SA/SEA: Muse Communication
- Original network: Tokyo MX, KBS, SUN, BS11
- Original run: July 12, 2020 – September 27, 2020
- Episodes: 12
- Manga

Monster Girl Doctor 0
- Written by: Yoshino Origuchi
- Illustrated by: Mitsuhiro Kimura
- Published by: Shueisha
- Magazine: Dash X Comic
- Original run: July 26, 2020 – April 4, 2021
- Volumes: 2
- icon

Monster Girl Doctor (Japanese: モンスター娘のお医者さん, Hepburn: Monsutā Musume no Oisha-san), also known as Doctor for Monster Girls, (Note: This title is seen on the cover of the Japanese version of the light novel.) is a Japanese light novel series written by Yoshino Origuchi and illustrated by Z-Ton. Shueisha published ten volumes of the series under their Dash X Bunko imprint. Seven Seas Entertainment has licensed the light novel series in English for North America. A manga adaptation by Tetsumaki Tomasu was serialized online in Tokuma Shoten's Comic Ryū Web magazine from February 2018 to December 2019. A second manga adaptation titled Monster Girl Doctor 0 was serialized in Shueisha's Dash X Comic from July 2020 to April 2021. An anime television series adaptation by Arvo Animation aired from July to September 2020.

== Premise ==
Taking place after a long war between humans and monsters ended, the story focuses on the human Dr. Glenn Litbeit and his lamia assistant, Saphentite "Sapphee" Neikes, as they run a clinic in the city of Lindworm, which is home to many species of monsters living alongside humans.

== Characters ==
Glenn Litbeit (グレン・リトバイト, Guren Ritobaito)
Voiced by: Shun'ichi Toki (Japanese); Griffin Puatu (English)
Glenn is a human male from a merchant family from the far east, who specialized in medicines during the war. He strives to become a doctor for the monster population of the city of Lindworm. His calm demeanor and quick mind and focus allow him to treat everyone from a harpy girl to an immortal dragon; this tends to make him have a cadre of girls vying for his affection, much to the annoyance of Sapphee. It is implied he reciprocates Sapphee's affections, but cannot act on it until his clinic is paid off. He has some oni blood in his lineage, which results in him having a higher body temperature than normal, allowing him to dress like it is summer even in the cold mountains.
Saphentite Neikes (サーフェンティット・ネイクス, Sāfentitto Neikusu)
Voiced by: Saori Ōnishi (Japanese); Cristina Vee (English)
Glenn's childhood friend and assistant in the clinic who goes by the nickname of "Sapphee". She organizes the clinic and monitors the fairies that assist them. She is a rare albino lamia, so she has to wear a special outfit whenever she goes out into the sunlight. Her family were also merchants during the war, allying with the Litbeit family to aid the wounded and ensure medicine production on both sides. She was sent to the Litbeits as a political hostage, where she met Glenn and fell in love with him; however, her family are also well known assassins, and if the Litbeits were to betray them she was set to kill Glenn's family. She also has a low tolerance for alcohol.
Tisalia Scythia (ティサリア・スキュテイアー, Tisaria Sukyuteiā)
Voiced by: Sarah Emi Bridcutt (Japanese); Julia McIlvaine (English)
A centaur who is the sole heiress of Scythia Transportation. A high ranked arena fighter, she was on a losing streak until Glenn realized her problem and was able to help her by giving her horseshoes. She is very open about her infatuation for Glenn and is not afraid to say so in public, mostly to annoy Sapphee, whom she considers a friend and romantic rival.
Lulala Heine (ルララ・ハイネ, Rurara Haine)
Voiced by: Yukiyo Fujii (Japanese); Ryan Bartley (English)
A mermaid who sings at the Merrow Waterways in order to provide financial support for her family. Even while suffering from inflammation of her gills due to staying above and out of water too much, she continued singing. She saved a boy from drowning and Glenn saves her from drowning due to her gills. She develops feelings for Glenn after he saved her and treated the inflammation.
Arahnia Taranterra Arachnida (アラーニャ・タランテラ・アラクニダ, Arānya Tarantera Arakunida)
Voiced by: Yū Shimamura (Japanese); Wendee Lee (English)
An arachne who is a fashion designer, sewing clothes with her own silk. She is a friend of Sapphee and has known her for a long time, and has made several of her sunblocking outfits due to arachne silk being very durable. Her skill is so good, she can do minute stitchwork swiftly and efficiently. She tries to seduce Glenn originally to get a response from Sapphee and Tisalia, but soon realizes that she has fallen for him herself.
Skadi Dragenfelt (スカディ・ドラーゲンフェルト, Sukadi Dorāgenferuto)
Voiced by: Atsumi Tanezaki (Japanese); Cherami Leigh (English)
The chairwoman and head council representative of Lindworm. She was the dragon that was able to bring the humans and monsters together before they could destroy each other completely, bringing an end to the war and founding the city as an experiment to see if monsters and humans can co-exist. She is hundreds of years old, yet has the body of a young girl. She dresses head to toe in robes and a veil so few have seen her face, but they are used to hide a parasitic condition. Due to said condition she rarely speaks above a whisper, so her words are relayed by Kunai (in a very loud tone).
Kunai Zenow (苦無・ゼナウ)
Voiced by: Maki Kawase (Japanese); Lizzie Freeman (English)
Lady Skadi's personal assistant and bodyguard. A rare flesh golem from the east, she was taken in by Skadi and became entirely devoted to her, and takes her job seriously. However, due to her nature, she has been known to lose parts if she is damaged. Due to how she was created, she is not fond of doctors and she can hear the voices of those whose body parts she is created from. While she is very proud of her warrior nature, her heart is that of a pure maiden, and she develops feelings for Glenn after he helps repair her during a mission. Now she goes to him whenever she needs to replace her stitches or parts, because as he helps her the voices are a lot quieter.
Illy (イリィ, Irii)
Voiced by: Sayumi Suzushiro (Japanese); Kira Buckland (English)
A harpy who was captured by bandits and forced to lay eggs, which were to be illegally sold. However, she had an impacted egg from stress until Glenn helped her while Skadi and Sapphee held off the remaining bandits. Afterward, she and the others went to a nearby harpy village to live.
Memé Redon (メメ・ルドン)
Voiced by: Miho Okasaki (Japanese); Giselle Fernandez (English)
A cyclops who works at the Kuklo Workshop. She has dry eye issues because hers is larger than the others; however, it gives her more clarity in very fine work such as detailing and making surgical instruments like scalpels and needles that the hospital and Glenn use. She was inspired by Skadi to try to make things people could use to live. She also likes wearing Gothic Lolita outfits created by Arahnia. While she seems to have feelings for Glenn, she often feels embarrassed when she get closer to him.
Kay Arte (ケイ・アルテ, Kei Arute)
Voiced by: Fairouz Ai (Japanese); Erica Mendez (English)
A centaur who is one of Tisalia's attendants. She was a war orphan who was adopted by the Arte family, servants of the Scythia family.
Lorna Arte (ローナ・アルテ, Rōna Arute)
Voiced by: M.A.O (Japanese); Sarah Anne Williams (English)
A centaur who is one of Tisalia's attendants. Like Kay, Lorna was a war orphan who was adopted by the Arte family. Due to her being more sensitive than Tisalia and Kay, she suffers from self-esteem issues and needs a more controlling hand than Kay. She is unknowingly into binding, which actually calms her down.
Dione Nephilim (ディオネ・ネフィリム, Dione Nefirimu)
Voiced by: Hisako Kanemoto (Japanese); Lizzie Freeman (English)
A rare gigas who lives near the harpy village and sees Glenn for a head cold while he was performing examinations at the village. Due to her size, she moves very slowly and carefully so not to injure any smaller creatures, but every step causes earthquakes and landslides. Though young for her race, she still is hundreds of years old and has known Cthulhy and Skadi for a long time. She is friends with Illy, who goes to her mountaintop to visit her.
Cthulhy Squele (クトゥリフ・スキュル, Kuturifu Sukyuru)
Voiced by: Yukana (Japanese); Jeannie Tirado (English)
A Cecaelia who is the head medical doctor of the Lindworm Central Hospital. Cthulhy is the mentor and primary teacher of both Glenn and Sapphee, and she had them start the clinic in order to expand their learning of medicine and to groom Glenn to take over for her one day. She has known Skadi for a long time, hinting that she is hundreds of years old, despite looking like she is in her 30s. She enjoys openly flirting with Glenn, much to the annoyance of Sapphee.
Aluloona Loona (アルルーナ・ルーナ, Arurūna Rūna)
Voiced by: Yō Taichi (Japanese); Cherami Leigh (English)
An alraune who is a member of the city council. Second-in-command to Skadi, she is in charge of agriculture. She rarely ever meets with men, due to her race's nymphomaniac nature. Aluloona punishes would-be assaulters by giving them to her less restrained daughters; they don't survive.
Molly Vanitas (モーリー・ヴァニタス, Mōrī Vuanitasu)
The former shoggoth that was attached to Skadi. Once collected, she joined the skeleton of the former supervisor of the dead district and is working to make it a tourist attraction with the help of the undead residents. She uses a shovel as a weapon in order to keep the more unruly monsters in line. She is also highly interested in Glenn, but more as a lover than a mate.
Sioux Litbeit (スー・リトバイト, Sū Ritobaito)
Glenn's sister from the east who suffers from Demonitis. She began sprouting horns from her forehead, which proves her family has more than just human blood in their ancestry, which lead her to overheating if she becomes flustered or overexerts herself until Glenn was able to help her. She currently works in the red light district as a patrol member. She considers Sapphee as her sister, and is friends with Memé and Arahnia. Due to all the women flocking to Glenn, she takes it upon herself, by orders of her mother, to find Glenn the most suitable to be his wife.

== Media ==
=== Light novel ===
The Monster Girl Doctor light novel series is written by Yoshino Origuchi and illustrated by Z-Ton, who is one of the artists featured in the Monster Musume: I ♥ Monster Girls manga anthology. Shueisha published ten volumes of the series under their Dash X Bunko imprint from June 24, 2016, to March 25, 2022. Seven Seas Entertainment licensed the series for its North American distribution, and the first volume was released on December 19, 2017.

==== Volumes ====
No.	Original release date	Original ISBN	English release date	English ISBN
1	June 24, 2016	978-4-08-631120-5	December 19, 2017	978-1-62-692654-7
2	December 22, 2016	978-4-08-631160-1	April 17, 2018	978-1-62-692740-7
3	June 23, 2017	978-4-08-631188-5	August 28, 2018	978-1-62-692867-1
4	February 23, 2018	978-4-08-631231-8	May 28, 2019	978-1-64-275056-0
5	December 21, 2018	978-4-08-631284-4	November 26, 2019	978-1-64-275725-5
6	July 25, 2019	978-4-08-631321-6	August 27, 2020 (digital); September 8, 2020 (print)	978-1-64-505513-6
7	November 22, 2019	978-4-08-631340-7	January 19, 2021	978-1-64-505822-9
0	March 25, 2020	978-4-08-631358-2	May 4, 2021	978-1-64-827196-0
8	July 22, 2020	978-4-08-631373-5	October 19, 2021	978-1-64-827319-3
9	February 25, 2021	978-4-08-631403-9	September 20, 2022	978-1-64-827573-9
10	March 25, 2022	978-4-08-631460-2	October 17, 2023	978-1-63-858327-1

=== Manga ===
A manga adaptation is illustrated by Tetsumaki Tomasu and was serialized online in Tokuma Shoten's Comic Ryū Web magazine from February 26, 2018, to December 20, 2019. It was collected in two tankōbon from January 2019 to March 2020.

==== Volumes ====
===== Monster Girl Doctor =====
No.	Japanese release date	Japanese ISBN
1	January 12, 2019	978-4-19-950666-6
2	March 13, 2020	978-4-19-950700-7

===== Monster Girl Doctor 0 =====
No.	Japanese release date	Japanese ISBN
1	February 19, 2021	978-4-08-891811-2
2	June 18, 2021	978-4-08-892016-0

=== Anime ===
An anime television series adaptation was announced by Bandai Namco Arts on November 14, 2019. The series was animated by Arvo Animation and directed by Yoshiaki Iwasaki, with Hideki Shirane handling series composition, Hiromi Kato designing the characters, and TO-MAS composing the music. While the anime had an advanced streaming debut on the d Anime Store on July 4, 2020, the series officially aired from July 12 to September 27, 2020, on Tokyo MX and other channels. The opening theme is "Campanella Hibiku Sora de" (カンパネラ響く空で; "In the Sky Where the Bells Ring") performed by ARCANA PROJECT, while the ending theme is "Yasashisa no Namae" (やさしさの名前; "The Name of Kindness") performed by Aina Suzuki.

Crunchyroll streamed the series. In Southeast Asia and South Asia, the series is licensed by Muse Communication and released on Muse Asia YouTube channel and streaming service iQIYI in Southeast Asia. On August 11, 2020, Crunchyroll announced that the series would receive an English dub, which premiered on August 16.

On May 18, 2021, it was announced Sentai Filmworks picked up the home video rights.

==== Episodes ====
No.	Title (Note: English translated titles are taken from Crunchyroll.)	Original release date
1	"The Centaur of the Arena"; Transliteration: "Tōgi-ba no Kentaurosu" (Japanese: 闘技場のケンタウロス)	July 12, 2020 (Note: It had an advanced streaming debut on July 4, 2020.)
Many years ago, a war raged between humans and monsters for 100 years. With both sides exhausted and unable to remember why the war began, peace broke out and now humans and monsters live in harmony. Dr. Glenn Litbeit, a human, specializes in treating monsters with his lamia assistant, Saphentite "Sapphee" Neikes. After conducting an examination on a female minotaur, which reveals her pregnancy, Glenn is asked by his mentor Dr. Cthulhy Squele, a Scylla, to conduct physical exams on fighters at the city arena. One of the fighters is Tisalia Scythia, a centaur who is the sole heiress of Scythia Transportation. During the examination, she expresses a wish to marry someone like Glenn, which makes Sapphee jealous. Tisalia has not won a battle in over a month, but Glenn finds nothing medically wrong with her. After a while, he finally realizes her belief that her body is already perfect meant she never allowed herself to be fitted with steel shoes and her hooves have worn unevenly, unbalancing her. Despite her protests, Glenn has new shoes fitted and she starts winning battles again. Glenn wonders if Cthulhy was testing how he would deal with a difficult patient.
2	"The Mermaid of the Waterways"; Transliteration: "Suiro-gai no Māmeido" (Japanese: 水路街のマーメイド)	July 19, 2020
Sapphee narrates how, during the war, she met Glenn as children when she was given to his father as a political hostage. After this, she did not see him again until they both entered the academy to study monster medicine. Glenn and Sapphee go shopping on the Merrow Waterways, built by the dragon Lady Skadi Dragenfelt. A mermaid singer, Lulala Heines, offers to let Glenn and Sapphee purchase a song, but despite her obvious skill, she is unable to finish. Glenn diagnoses Lulala with inflamed gills from not spending enough time in the water. Lulala claims she will soon earn a salary singing at the Central Council Hall, but in the meantime must sing on the Waterways to support her mother and siblings. A human child falls into the water and Lulala manages to save him. However, with her gills inflamed, she accidentally inhales water into her lungs and begins to drown. Glenn manages to save her by forcing air into her lungs via a kiss so her gills can expel the inhaled water. After Glenn provides medicine for Lulala's gills, she starts singing full-time at the Council Hall and develops a crush on him.
3	"The Flesh Golem Who Hates Doctors"; Transliteration: "Isha-girai no Furesshu Gōremu" (Japanese: 医者嫌いのフレッシュゴーレム)	July 26, 2020
Sometime in the evening, a woman is chasing a bandit when she is ambushed. The next day, after Glenn and Sapphee finish treating a slime girl, they are approached by Lady Skadi and her bodyguard, Kunai Zenow. Skadi asks if they can help locate and reattach Kunai's right arm. She then reveals that Kunai is a flesh golem. Once Skadi leaves, Kunai refuses Glenn's help due to her hatred of doctors and she decides to look for her arm on her own. Outside, she notices another bandit and she follows them. Later, Glenn is out looking for Kunai's arm when he runs into Tisalia, who finds Kunai's leg. Examining the leg, Glenn notices the stitches are badly degraded. He then heads further into town where he runs into Lulala, who has Kunai's arm. Using the body parts to locate Kunai, Glenn reattaches them, despite her protests. Meanwhile, at the clinic, Sapphee has a conversation with her friend Arahnia Taranterra Arachnida. After Glenn is finished, Kunai thanks him. It is later revealed the bandits were watching. When Glenn returns to the clinic, Sapphee tells him she believes that she is pregnant.
4	"The Lamia With an Incurable Disease"; Transliteration: "Fuji-no-yamai no Ramia" (Japanese: 不治の病のラミア)	August 2, 2020
Sapphee reveals that she was actually hiding an abandoned harpy egg. Just then, several bandits attack the clinic. When they run into Kunai, she explains the bandits are slavers. They join Skadi and Lulala on the Waterways where they are attacked by archers. Fortunately, Tisalia was nearby and she fights them. At the hideout, one of the harpies has an impacted egg from stress. While Skadi and Sapphee fight the bandits, Sapphee regrets hiding from Glenn that she has an incurable illness, and that her family specializes in assassination. As children, she was actually under orders to assassinate Glenn's family if the business deal fell through. During the battle, Sapphee is poisoned and passes out. When she awakens, Glenn explains the slavers were arrested and the harpy laid her egg safely. Sapphee decides to admit the truth to Glenn, who reveals he actually knew already. Sapphee is so happy she attempts to seduce him, only to pass out again. Glenn agrees to hold her tail until she sleeps, like when they were children. Sapphee hints that the incurable illness she suffers from might just be love.
5	"The Centaur With a Sprain"; Transliteration: "Nenza no Kentaurosu" (Japanese: 捻挫のケンタウロス)	August 9, 2020
Glenn hires Tisalia to transport them to the harpy village for the harpies' medical checks. A rockslide injures Kay, one of Tisalia's attendants, so she is flown to the village by the harpies where Glenn diagnoses her with a sprain. Lorna, Kay's childhood friend, becomes extremely distracted without Kay and almost ruins Tisalia's negotiations to employ the harpies as air couriers. Worried, Tisalia asks Glenn to examine Lorna. Glenn struggles to know where to start as Lorna has a psychological issue. Sapphee suggests that since Lorna grew up higher strung and more sensitive than Tisalia and Kay, she may feel useless without someone in charge. Glenn makes the strange decision to take all control away from Lorna, outfitting her with a blindfold and reins. Surprisingly, Lorna immediately feels better as she is more able to focus on her job, though Glenn privately thinks Lorna might simply enjoy being tied up. As thanks, Kay and Lorna try to seduce Glenn together, reasoning that if they sleep together, Tisalia would probably insist Glenn take responsibility by marrying her. Glenn is quick to refuse, but Kay and Lorna still hope Glenn becomes their master as well one day.
6	"The Harpy Who Couldn't Fly"; Transliteration: "Tobenai Hāpī" (Japanese: 飛べないハーピー)	August 16, 2020
After checking on Kay, Glenn, Sapphee, and Tisalia visit Illy. There, Glenn examines her where he states that she is not sick and is simply molting. An angry Illy attempts to attack Glenn, but she is stopped by Tisalia. When Tisalia catches up with her, Illy challenges her to a fight. Afterwards, Tisalia reveals to Glenn and Sapphee that she won the fight. When she hands Glenn a feather Illy lost during the fight, he asks Sapphee and Tisalia if they can help with something. The following day, they gather all the feathers they can find. Later that night, Illy reminisces when she used to be able to fly. When they catch up with her, Glenn reveals the reason she is molting is she is getting her adult feathers and she has phoenix blood in her. In Lindworm, it is revealed Cthulhy already knew this. Sometime later, an elated Illy shows off her new wings and she is able to fly again. When one of her new feathers falls into Glenn's hand, he notes that it is hot, wondering if Illy may be closer to the phoenix than he first thought. Meanwhile, Arahnia visits the clinic to see Glenn.
7	"The Hedonistic Arachne"; Transliteration: "Kyōraku no Arakune" (Japanese: 享楽のアラクネ)	August 23, 2020
Just as Glenn and Sapphee are about to head home, Illy shows up covered in a sticky substance. Glenn notices that it is arachne silk. Heading to the forest, Glenn and Sapphee run into Arahnia where she introduces herself to Glenn. Arahnia reveals she is there to catch Illy so she can see her rainbow wings for herself. At the village, a very excited Arahnia meets Illy. Meanwhile, Sapphee and Tisalia get into an argument over Arahnia. The following day, Sapphee, Kay, and Lorna are at the hot springs. While this is happening, Arahnia visits Glenn. Afterwards, she asks him to join her where she catches him in a trap. She wants to seduce him so she can be closer to Sapphee. However, Tisalia arrives to stop her. Arahnia states she and Tisalia are the same in terms of what they want. Just as they are about to fight each other, Sapphee shows up. She tells them Glenn has no time for courtship. Later that night, Sapphee tells Glenn she loves him. They are then interrupted when they hear tremors caused by a gigas.
8	"Attack on Gigas"; Transliteration: "Shingeki no Gigasu" (Japanese: 進撃のギガス)	August 30, 2020
The village is frightened as the giant goddess gets closer. Tisalia takes charge and gets everyone to work together to evacuate the village, sends Illy to Lindworm to speak with Lady Skadi, and then sneaks off to face the giant alone. However, she is stopped by Sapphee and Glenn, who realized she was not with the group. Just then, the giant, Dione Nephilim, appears, asking to see Glenn. Meanwhile, in Lindworm, Skadi tells a panicked Illy about her. Glenn realizes Dione has a head cold and offers her medicine and asks Arahnia to make her some new warmer clothes, while the harpies make friends with her, especially Illy. The group head back to Lindworm to reopen the clinic, where Glenn asks Tisalia out to dinner. During the dinner, Tisalia finds Sapphee spying on them and both declare that they will not lose in the battle for Glenn's heart. Shortly afterwards, everyone arrives at the Merrow Waterways for the commemoration ceremony, where Glenn notices something wrong with Skadi's tail. As Skadi is giving a speech, she passes out in front of everyone.
9	"The Collapsed Dragon"; Transliteration: "Taoreta Doragon" (Japanese: 倒れたドラゴン)	September 6, 2020
At the Lindworm Central Hospital, Cthulhy explains to Glenn and Sapphee that despite her resilient dragon physiology, Skadi has a rare condition that will eventually kill her. She also mentions Skadi has no interest in being cured. Kunai later asks Glenn to help Skadi. Once he is inside Skadi's room, Glenn hears Skadi's voice for the first time and finds she has the appearance of a young girl. Skadi reluctantly agrees to be examined and reveals a tumor on her chest that has begun infiltrating her veins and altering her blood flow. She believes it is karma for her dragon ancestors leaving the realm of Gods and for her actions during the Great War. Glenn asks Cthulhy's permission to perform a complicated surgery and she agrees after hearing his heartfelt motivations, but worries Skadi will still need convincing and they require at least one more surgeon. Glenn asks Arahnia for her sewing skills to help repair the damaged veins. Arahnia refuses at first but relents after realizing she would get to wear a nurse's uniform like Sapphee. Undaunted by the challenge, Glenn begins his preparation.
10	"The Self-Deprecating Cyclops"; Transliteration: "Jigyaku no Saikuropusu" (Japanese: 自虐のサイクロプス)	September 13, 2020
Kunai attempts to convince Skadi to have the surgery without success. Meanwhile, Glenn visits the Kuklo Workshop to talk to the boss about creating some surgical tools when he runs into Memé. As they are walking, Memé becomes flustered due to her lack of confidence. When they reach the boss, he asks her to create the needles, much to her chagrin. Later, Arahnia is at the clinic where she practices for the surgery with Kunai. Cthulhy and Glenn go to check on the new tools. Memé is in the drafting room trying to review the needles when the spinning wheel catches her eye. The next day, Illy rushes to the clinic to get Glenn as Memé has passed out. Glenn takes her to the clinic and asks her what she was doing, where he figures she suffered from exhaustion and vertigo. She then shows everyone her new plan to make new stronger, thinner needles, which earns her praise. As Glenn heads off to once again convince Skadi to have the surgery, Sapphee and Arahnia wish him luck.
11	"Lindworm's Major Operation"; Transliteration: "Rindo Vurumu Dai Shujutsu" (Japanese: リンド・ヴルム大手術)	September 20, 2020
Glenn arrives at the Central Council Hall to convince Skadi to have the surgery. Meanwhile, Sapphee, Arahnia, and Tisalia have a girls' night out at a pub. When they return to the clinic, Sapphee catches Arahnia stealing a dragon scale. Attempting to flee, she is stopped by Tisalia and Sapphee. Rather than turn her in to the authorities, Sapphee and Tisalia have a heartfelt conversation with a surprised Arahnia. They also reveal to Arahnia that she has fallen in love with Glenn. Sometime later, Glenn catches up with Skadi where she explains why she refuses to have the surgery. However, when Glenn tells her that she deserves to live a happy life, Skadi decides to have the surgery after all. On the night of the surgery, Glenn, Cthulhy, Sapphee, and Arahnia operate on Skadi, while all of Lindworm holds a vigil hoping for its success. The next morning, it is revealed that the surgery was a success and the city rejoices.
12	"The City of Dragons' Doctor"; Transliteration: "Ryū no Machi no Oishasan" (Japanese: 竜の街のお医者さん)	September 27, 2020
Following the surgery, Skadi arrives at a ceremony. She then heads to the clinic. Meanwhile, Glenn treats an ill Sapphee. When he leaves the clinic to make a house call, he runs into Skadi and Kunai. However, when their carriage is broken, Memé shows up and fixes it. Skadi thanks Glenn and Memé by giving them two large barrels of wine. Back at the clinic, Arahnia looks after Sapphee. At the harpy village, Dione helps the harpies. When Glenn returns, he has Tisalia, Kay, and Lorna transport the barrels for them. At the clinic, Arahnia teases Sapphee about Glenn when Illy and her friends show up. They give Sapphee and Arahnia some food from their village and the mountains. Just then, Glenn arrives and he is mobbed by the girls. Glenn reveals that on his way home, everyone kept giving him food. Later that night, a party takes place in the city.

== See also ==
- Nurse Hitomi's Monster Infirmary, a manga series with a similar premise
