= Studio Cabana =

Japanese manga series

- First tankōbon volume cover

スタジオカバナ (Sutajio Kabana)
- Genre: Coming-of-age, romance
- Manga
- Written by: Agri Uma
- Published by: ASCII Media Works
- English publisher: NA: Yen Press
- Imprint: Sylph Comics
- Magazine: Pixiv Sylph
- Original run: June 24, 2021 – present
- Volumes: 9
- Anime television series
- Directed by: Shinichirō Ushijima
- Written by: Sawako Hirabayashi
- Studio: Juvenage
- Original run: 2027 – scheduled
- icon

Studio Cabana (Japanese: スタジオカバナ, Hepburn: Sutajio Kabana) is a Japanese manga series written and illustrated by Agri Uma. It began serialization on the Pixiv Comic website under ASCII Media Works' Pixiv Sylph brand in June 2021. An anime television series adaptation produced by Juvenage is set to premiere in 2027.

== Synopsis ==
Yukari Maki is a high school girl who believes her best quality is her honesty. She feels that she has nothing in common her delinquent classmate Yusuke Kusaka, and becomes attached to him, becoming his caretaker much to his disapproval. Later, she follows him to a music studio named "Studio Cabana" and discovers Yusuke's secret as a musician.

== Characters ==
Yukari Maki (牧 ゆかり, Maki Yukari)
Voiced by: Sayumi Suzushiro (PV, voice comic, anime)
Yusuke Kusaka (日下 優助, Kusaka Yūsuke)
Voiced by: Koki Uchiyama (PV, voice comic)

== Media ==
=== Manga ===
Written and illustrated by Agri Uma, Studio Cabana began serialization on the Pixiv Comic website under ASCII Media Works' Pixiv Sylph brand on June 24, 2021. Its chapters have been compiled into nine tankōbon volumes as of August 2026.

During their panel at Anime North 2026, Yen Press announced that they had licensed the series for English publication.

| No. | Original release date | Original ISBN | North American release date | North American ISBN |
|---|---|---|---|---|
| 1 | September 21, 2021 | 978-4-04-913884-9 | December 15, 2026 | 979-8-8554-3670-9 |
Chapters 1–4
| 2 | February 21, 2022 | 978-4-04-914242-6 | — | — |
Chapters 5–8; Bonus Track 1; Character Profile
| 3 | August 22, 2022 | 978-4-04-914587-8 | — | — |
Chapters 9–13
| 4 | February 21, 2023 | 978-4-04-914899-2 | — | — |
Chapters 14–17; Bonus Track 2
| 5 | August 21, 2023 | 978-4-04-915227-2 | — | — |
Chapters 18–22
| 6 | May 22, 2024 | 978-4-04-915613-3 | — | — |
Chapters 23–27
| 7 | March 22, 2025 | 978-4-04-916219-6 | — | — |
Chapters 28–32
| 8 | November 21, 2025 | 978-4-04-916700-9 | — | — |
Chapters 33–36; Bonus Track 4
| 9 | August 21, 2026 | 978-4-04-952373-7 | — | — |
Chapters 37–41

=== Anime ===
An anime television series adaptation was announced on July 22, 2026. It will be produced by Juvenage and directed by Shinichirō Ushijima, with series composition handled by Sawako Hirabayashi and characters designed by Haruka Sagawa. The series is set to premiere in 2027.

=== Other ===
In commemoration of the second volume's release on February 21, 2022, two promotional videos were uploaded to the Kadokawa YouTube channel that same day. The first one featured a voice performance from Sayumi Suzushiro, while the second one was a TikTok-style video centered around Yusuke. In commemoration of the fifth volume's release on August 21, 2023, another promotional video, and a voice comic were uploaded to the same YouTube channel that same day. Both featured voice performances from Suzushiro and Koki Uchiyama. In commemoration of the seventh volume's release on March 22, 2025, another promotional video was again uploaded to the same channel four days earlier, and featured Suzushiro and Uchiyama reprising their roles.

== Reception ==
The series was nominated for the ninth Next Manga Awards in the web category.
