= Arvo Animation =

Japanese animation studio

Arvo Animation Inc.

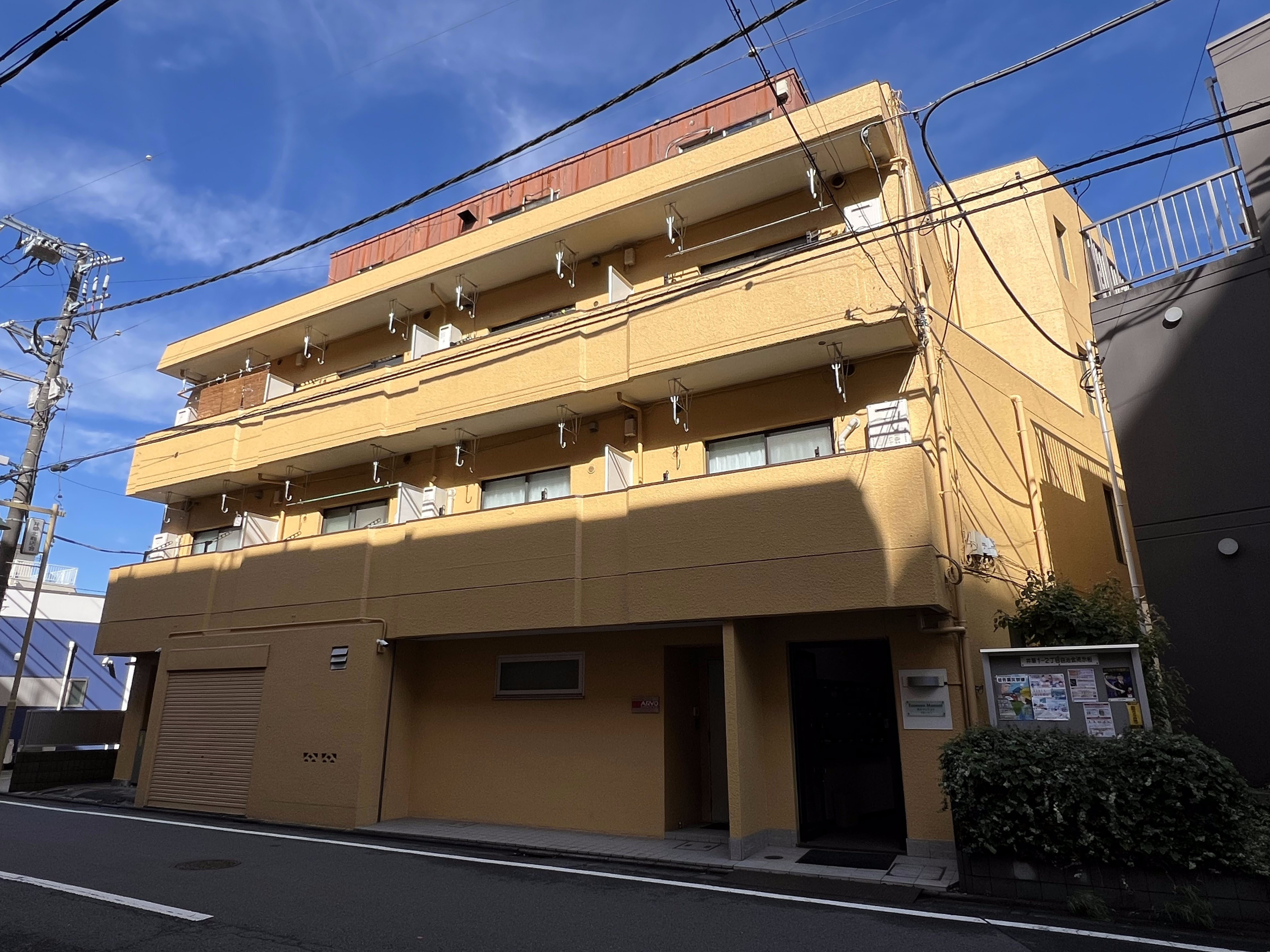
- Headquarters in Suginami, Tokyo
- Native name: 株式会社アルボアニメーション
- Romanized name: Kabushiki-gaisha Arubo Animēshon
- Type: Kabushiki gaisha
- Industry: Japanese animation
- Founded: July 2017; 9 years ago
- Headquarters: Kami-Igusa, Suginami, Tokyo, Japan
- Key people: Rajeev Karki (president)
- Total equity: ¥ 3,000,000
- Number of employees: 47
- Divisions: Arvo Animation Animation Team; Arvo Animation Tokyo Studio; Arvo Animation Yamagata Studio; Arvo Animation Chiba Studio
- Website: arvo-animation.co.jp

Arvo Animation Inc. (Japanese: 株式会社アルボアニメーション, Hepburn: Kabushiki-gaisha Arubo Animēshon) is a Japanese animation studio based in Suginami, Tokyo.

== Works ==
=== Television series ===
Year	Title	Director(s)	Animation producer(s)	Source	Eps.	Refs.
2019	We Never Learn: Bokuben (co-animated with Silver)	Yoshiaki Iwasaki	Hideo Deguchi; Kazuyuki Ida	Manga	26	
2020	Monster Girl Doctor	Yoshiaki Iwasaki	Rajeev Karki	Light novel	12	
2021	Irina: The Vampire Cosmonaut	Akitoshi Yokoyama	Rajeev Karki	Light novel	12	
2023—present	A Returner's Magic Should Be Special	Taishi Kawaguchi	Rajeev Karki	Novel	TBA	
2025	Kowloon Generic Romance	Yoshiaki Iwasaki	Rajeev Karki	Manga	13	
2026	Super Psychic Policeman Chojo	Junichi Yamamoto	Rajeev Karki	Manga	TBA	

=== Films ===
Year	Title	Director(s)	Animation producer(s)	Source	Refs.
2026	Paris ni Saku Étoile	Gorō Taniguchi	Rajeev Karki	Original work	

=== Original video animations ===
Year	Title	Director(s)	Animation producer(s)	Source	Eps.	Refs.
2019–2020	We Never Learn: Bokuben	Yoshiaki Iwasaki	Hideo Deguchi; Kazuyuki Ida	Manga	2	

== Notable staff ==
=== Representative Staff ===
- Taishi Kawaguchi (animation director since 2021; first president, 2021~2025)
