= Syd Craft: Love Is a Mystery =

Japanese manga series

- First tankōbon volume cover, featuring (clockwise from seated) Syd Craft, Elio Evelyn (Levie Oleyn), Lulu Chatnoir, and Souffle Flamberry

シド・クラフトの最終推理 (Shido Kurafuto no Saishū Suiri)
- Genre: Mystery; Romantic comedy
- Manga
- Written by: Taishi Tsutsui
- Published by: Shueisha
- English publisher: NA: Viz Media
- Imprint: Jump Comics
- Magazine: Weekly Shōnen Jump
- Original run: November 18, 2024 – June 16, 2025
- Volumes: 4
- icon

Syd Craft: Love Is a Mystery (Japanese: シド・クラフトの最終推理, Hepburn: Shido Kurafuto no Saishū Suiri; lit. 'Syd Craft's Final Deductions') is a Japanese manga series written and illustrated by Taishi Tsutsui. It was serialized in Shueisha's shōnen manga magazine Weekly Shōnen Jump from November 2024 to June 2025, with its individual chapters collected in two tankōbon volumes as of June 2025. The series follows Syd Craft, a brilliant young detective who solves mysteries with his assistant Elio Evelyn; together, they help police inspector Souffle Flamberry and thwart criminals, including the cat burglar Lulu Chatnoir. The four are entangled in an unrecognized, unrequited love triangle.

Viz Media licensed the manga in North America. Shueisha simultaneously published the series in English on the website and app Manga Plus.

== Plot ==
Syd Craft is a "great detective" who combines keen observation with deductive reasoning to solve the most difficult cases while maintaining a cool, professional demeanor. Privately, he hates blood and scary situations, but fell into the detective business due to his background and talents; rather than mysteries, he relaxes by reading romance novels written by his favorite author, Levie Oleyn. Levie's novels are popular and allow Syd an outlet to socialize with others, including Lulu Chatnoir.

Syd is assisted by Elio Evelyn, a cheerful and popular teenager; while Elio idolizes Syd's suave manner and abilities, Syd envies Elio's easy manner with women. Syd is notably unlucky in love, as the women he meets also often are responsible for the crimes he solves. Police Inspector Souffle Flamberry reluctantly relies on their help to catch criminals and considers Syd a rival; she is determined to solve a crime before he does. Lulu has a secret identity as Phantom Thief Mistcat, an altruistic cat burglar whose heists are repeatedly stopped by Syd.

== Characters ==
Syd Craft (シド・クラフト, Shido Kurafuto)
Syd is a great detective, born to parents who were great detectives, and thrust into his celebrated great detective career through a series of childhood traumas: his first love's parents were murdered and she was adopted by distant relatives, his best friend turned to a life of crime as part of the family business, and his tutor was a serial killer. Since then, he has continued to attract difficult cases while seeking comfort and escape in the romance novels of Levie Oleyn. Despite his keen powers of observation, he fails to recognize the true identities of the women closest to him: faithful assistant Elio is actually Levie, police inspector Souffle is his first love, and romance fan Lulu is Phantom Thief Mistcat.
Elio Evelyn (エリオ・エヴリン, Erio Evurin) / Levie Oleyn (レビエ・オレイン, Rebie Orein)
Elio is Syd's young assistant, who idolizes and is learning Syd's skills. As an assistant, Elio dresses as a boy to disguise her true identity as the count's daughter of the same name, Elio Evelyn. She also writes under an anagrammatic pseudonym as novelist Levie Oleyn. After Syd cleared her of false criminal charges, she responded to his advertisement for a male assistant to learn the detective craft; unknown to her, he specifically requested a male assistant because talking to women makes him nervous. When she is overwhelmed by her feelings for Syd, she expresses them in written notes, which have been collected and published as romantic novels by Levie; she believes her confessions are safe, as she assumes Syd never reads romances.
Souffle Flamberry (スフレ・フランベリ, Sufure Furanberi)
Souffle is a police inspector who relies Syd's help to solve the most difficult cases, to her eternal shame; she considers Syd her fiercest rival and dreams that one day she will surpass him. Syd is able to talk to her because he is slightly intimidated by her forward manner. She and Syd are both unaware they thought of each other as their first loves, as they were separated as children after a robber murdered her parents. Like Syd, she does not know Elio is Levie.
Lulu Chatnoir (ルル・シャノワール, Ruru Shanowāru)
Lulu is also a fan of the romance novels of Levie Oleyn. Her secret identity as the seventh to bear the title Phantom Thief Mistcat is closely guarded by the Chatnoir family, which regard the Craft family as their mortal enemies. Lulu is quite perceptive and immediately saw that Elio is a woman after they first met; she later learns that Elio is Levie, the author. Syd assumes Lulu has started to visit the agency more often to pursue a relationship with Elio, as he believes Elio is popular with women. After learning that Syd is vulnerable to seduction, her attempts to gain an advantage result in awkward situations with Syd, just short of making him succumb.
Hakua Metalica
Hakua is a brilliant inventor and the daughter of Syd's landlord. In the five years he has known her, she has proven to be intractably lazy and also has grown from a tomboy to an adult who considers Syd her big brother.
Zero Craft (ゼロ・クラフト, Zero Kurafuto)
Zero is a mysterious relative of Syd who is the mastermind responsible for goading Scissorleg into his crimes and the Elfy bombing incident. Zero claims to love Syd and promises to keep sending difficult cases to him.

== Publication ==
Written and illustrated by Taishi Tsutsui, Syd Craft: Love Is a Mystery was serialized in Shueisha's Weekly Shōnen Jump magazine from November 18, 2024, to June 16, 2025.

No.	Release date	ISBN
1	April 4, 2025	978-4-08-884453-4
1. "A Great Detective's Fate" (名探偵の宿命, Mei Tantei no Shukumei Case); 2. "The Great Detective and Secret Reverence" (名探偵と密かなる敬愛, Mei Tantei to Hisokanaru Keiai Case); 3. "Thus the Transformation Deceives the Great Detective" (その変幻はかくして名探偵を絆し惑わす, Sono Hengen wa Kakushite Mei Tantei o Kizuna shi Madowasu); 4. "Cats at Twilight Strangely Sleep to the Same Dream" (宵闇の猫は奇しくも同じ夢に眠る, Yoiyami no Neko wa Kushikumo Onaji Yume ni Nemuru); 5. "The Great Detective and the Stormy Night" (名探偵と遣らずの雨の一夜, Mei Tantei to Yarazunoame no Ichiya); 6. "The Lost Cat Dwells on an Enemy Love Letter" (迷い猫は敵陣の恋文に馳せる, Mayoi Neko wa Tekijin no Koibumi ni Haseru); 7. "The Great Detective's Crew Sets Out to Sea in Disguise" (名探偵一味は装い洋上に舞う, Mei Tantei Ichimi wa Yosōi Yōjō ni Mau)
Syd Craft reflects briefly how he became a great detective, fated to attract cases. When he visits a pub with his popular assistant Elio Evelyn, Inspector Souffle Flamberry presents a murder mystery, and Syd deduces the pub's owner is the culprit. In separate reveals, Elio is a woman and Souffle is Syd's long-lost first love. Syd meets a fellow fan of romance novelist Levie Oleyn at Cafe Elmo; while tailing Syd, Elio encounters Souffle, and the cafe erupts into flames. Elio overhears a confession and is abducted; Syd pieces together the clues and saves her. Later, Elio writes down her overwhelming emotions for Syd: she is author Levie Oleyn, whose feelings are adapted into the Sophia's Unforgivable Love series. Syd's pen pal gives him tickets to a stage adaptation of Sophia in Wesdia; on the train ride there, he runs into Souffle, who is escorting con artist Petty Jean to jail. Petty overwhelms Souffle and assumes her identity, but Syd uncovers the deception. When they arrive, Syd invites Souffle to watch Sophia with him. Phantom Thief Mistcat (Lulu Chatnoir) taunts Souffle by declaring her next target is at a museum; when she goes to case it, Lulu and Syd bond over their shared love of the Sophia novels, and he inadvertently foils all of her attempts to steal the artwork while returning her book. After getting caught in the rain, Syd and Elio shelter with a kindly man who is the notorious killer Scissorleg. Elio mistakes Syd's actions for love and panics while they are hiding together, stopping the killer. When Lulu comes to the agency hoping to find Syd's weaknesses, she sees through Elio's male disguise immediately. Souffle arrives to explain a love note she apparently sent to Syd, and the others pounce on her for romance advice. Syd realizes the note is a bomb threat acrostic for the cruise ship Elfy and all four make plans to join the voyage. Posing as newlyweds, Syd and Souffle board the Elfy; stowaway Elio is pressed into service as a substitute singer and ad-libs lyrics revealing her jealousy. Syd and Souffle find and subdue one bomber in the boiler room, who reveals there is another bomber.
2	June 4, 2025	978-4-08-884555-5
8. "The Scales of Love and Her Resolve" (愛の天秤と彼女の覚悟, Ai no Tenbin to Kanojo no Kakugo); 9. "The Formless Fan and the Great Detective's Determination" (姿なき愛好家と名探偵の決意, Sugata Naki Aikō-ka to Mei Tantei no Ketsui); 10. "The Drifting Great Detective Nearly Succumbs to the Hot Spring" (たゆたう名探偵は湯花の誘いに瀕する, Tayutau na Tantei wa Yubana no Sasoi ni Hinsuru); 11. "The Great Detective Teams Up on His Long-Overdue Homecoming" (名探偵は久方の帰省に共闘する, Mei Tantei wa Hisakata no Kisei ni Kyōtō Suru); 12. "An Extraordinary Day in a Magnificent Noble Daughter's Life" (絢爛たる令嬢のとある非日常, Kenrantaru Reijō no Toaru hi Nichijō); 13. "The Great Detective Yields to the Red-Lipped Peach Blossom" (名探偵は朱唇の桃化に屈託する, Mei Tantei wa Shushin no Momo-ka ni Kuttaku Suru); 14. "The Twilight Cat Scopes the Enemy's Situation" (宵闇の猫は敵陣情勢を俯瞰する, Yoiyami no Neko wa Tekijin Jōsei o Fukan Suru); 15. "Ghosts Sometimes Seductively Tempt the Great Detective" (怪異は時に名探偵を蠱惑に誘う, Kaii wa Tokini Mei Tantei o Kowaku ni Izanau); 16. "The Girl in Pursuit and the Lovely Inner Conflict" (追跡する彼女と可憐なる内包コンフリクト, Tsuiseki Suru Kanojo to Karen'naru Naihō Konfurikuto)
The other bomber is the singer Kate Waltz, who is acting to save her beloved, who is being held hostage. Lulu manages to separate the locked bomb from Kate before it explodes; as the passengers abandon the sinking ship, Syd returns to find Souffle chained to another bomb; a recorded message from Zero Craft declares their love for Syd, and Zero confesses they are the mastermind behind the bombs. Souffle saves Syd from drowning by giving him another breath by mouth while he solves the lock puzzle; Lulu carries them off Elfy before it sinks. Separated from the other lifeboats, Syd, Souffle, Elio, and Lulu end up on a deserted island, where they warm up in a natural hot spring. Syd tries to keep his distance out of modesty, but realizes it is a geyser and rushes to warn the others; just before Elio's secret is revealed, he and Souffle pass out from the heat. Improbably, the island is owned by Mr. Luce, Syd's pen-pal friend who rescues them. Returning home to see what his parents might know about Zero, Syd is greeted by Lulu, posing as a maid, and together they play a game of Twister to unlock family secrets, which are embarrassing childhood photographs of Syd. Even though his parents recognized her as a Chatnoir, they pushed them together deliberately and Lulu learns of Syd's weakness to women. Elio starts her day as the lovely daughter of Count Evelyn; while commuting to work as Syd's assistant, she and Syd track down a hijacked cargo of Levie's latest novel and share a warm memory, but she forgets to go to work, causing Syd to fret. Syd and Souffle discuss Zero at a cafe, where a distracted Syd remembers their underwater kiss; he unwittingly manages to foil the plans of waitress "Madhell" Misery Killthy while solving the mystery of the on-the-run slasher. Mistcat's awkward attempts at seduction lead Lulu to seek coaching from Souffle, who mistakenly teaches her martial arts. During the lesson, Lulu realizes that both Elio and Souffle love Syd. Syd manages to move Lulu's heart, just before she collapses from overexertion. Syd investigates a "haunted" mansion with Elio, Souffle, and Lulu; it is filled with traps prepared by "Madhell" Misery that prove more thrilling than deadly, placing Syd with each woman in a compromising position. While pursuing a drug smuggler, Syd and Souffle go undercover at a maid cafe; after he defends her costume from ridicule by her superior Constable Pierre Hogale, she indulges her personal style and arrives at the agency in a cute outfit the next day.
3	August 4, 2025	978-4-08-884609-5
17. "The Noble Daughter Author Has Another Chance Encounter at a Certain Meeting" (かの会合にて令嬢作家は再び邂逅する, Kano Kaigō Nite Reijō Sakka wa Futatabi Kaigō Suru); 18. "For Whom the Twilight Cat Dances" (宵闇の猫は誰が為に舞う, Yoiyami no Neko wa Daregatame ni Mau); 19. "The Inventor Downstairs Trifles with the Great Detective with Abandon" (階下の発明家は奔放に名探偵を翻弄する, Kaika no Hatsumei-ka wa Honpō ni Mei Tantei o Honrō Suru); 20. "They Often Feel Overwhelmed by Revealing Falsehoods" (時に彼らは偽りの開示に胸蓋がる, Tokini Karera wa Itsuwari no Kaiji ni Mune Futa Garu); 21. "A Desperate Cat and a New Target" (窮余の猫と新たなる標的, Kyūyo no Neko to Aratanaru Hyōteki); 22. "The Imposed Choice and the New Clue" (課せられた選択と新たなるよすが, Kase Rareta Sentaku to Aratanaru Yosuga); 23. "The Lie Brought to Light and Feelings Carried On" (白日の嘘と受け継ぐ想い, Hakujitsu no Uso to Uketsugu Omoi)
Levie Oleyn is surprised to see Lulu and Syd at her planned final book signing; his suspicions about her flimsy disguise are allayed when her editor, Nina Elena, poses as Elio with Lulu. When Syd saves Levie from a jealous author, Nina sees how Levie is inspired and asks him to court her. Syd surprises Lulu at Kitten Orphanage; she visits often to donate and volunteer, and he has learned that Mistcat might be its mysterious benefactor. After playing with the children and helping put them down for a nap, Syd tells a young orphan thief that Mistcat is motivated to help others, not flaunt her skills, and Lulu develops real feelings for Syd. When Elio is startled by a loud noise downstairs, Syd introduces her to the landlord's daughter, Hakua Matelica, an inventor who has been trying to facilitate his work so he can spend more time with her again. When her latest automata malfunction, jeopardizing Elio's modesty (and identity), Syd rescues them and is later incapacitated by Hakua's attentions. Souffle asks Syd if he has a girlfriend, and his interest in romance is revealed by Hakua's latest invention, a robotic lie detector. In swift order, the detector shows Elio has a crush on someone in the room, Souffle runs out before hearing if he thinks she is cute, Syd is keeping secrets from Hakua, and finally he confesses to Lulu that he shares her unspoken dream to live quietly with someone they love, not pursuing their careers. In a final lie, Lulu denies having feelings for Syd. Mistcat lures Elio into a deadly trap to save the Kitten Orphanage, who have been abducted by Zero Craft, but she is stopped by Syd. He decoded her Caesar cipher and they prepare to track down Zero. Syd and Mistcat find the orphans, held atop a tower by a man calling himself X Craft. When the hideout bursts into flames, Mistcat and the orphans are sent down by Syd, who stays behind to operate the lift. As his escape plan fails, she saves him from falling, vowing to steal his heart; Elio and Souffle are shocked to see Mistcat kissing Syd. In the aftermath, Syd dismisses Elio, concerned that his assistant is endangered by association; Evelyn family retainer Steve reveals her secret identities. Her carriage is waylaid by an assailant on Zero's orders and she stays to protect Steve, cutting her hair to escape and overpower her foe, with help from Syd, who had read the notes Elio left behind, prompting him to dash out of the office.
4	September 4, 2025	978-4-08-884742-9
24. "Our Crude and Unembellished Reverence" (無粋で飾らぬ僕たちの敬愛, Busui de Kazaranu Bokutachi no Keiai); 25. "You in My Recollection Confused with the Truth" (追憶の君は真実に惑う, Tsuioku no Kimi wa Shinjitsu ni Madou); 26. "The Great Detective and the Bonds of the Pact" (名探偵と盟約の絆, Mei Tantei to Meiyaku no Kizuna); 27. "The Conclusion of a Certain Story of Love and Yearning" (或る渇愛物語の帰結, Aru Katsuai Monogatari no Kiketsu); 28. "The Great Detective's Final Deduction" (名探偵の最終推理, Mei Tantei no Saishū Suiri)
Syd arrives just in time to knock out the assailant and tells Elio she is strong, having saved both Steve and him, then asks her to stay as his assistant. He confesses to being a huge fan of her romances and Elio kisses him; they are surprised by Lulu, who saw them. In a hazy childhood memory, Syd realizes that a dog bit him in the past. Elsewhere, X approaches Souffle. After Lulu realizes that Souffle is Syd's first love, he rushes to her, fearing she will be targeted next while remembering how, as children, she used to chase him with her dog. When he finds her unharmed, he deduces she is Zero Craft from the assembled clues; in a hypnotic trance induced by X, she stabs Syd. X is their childhood friend Toby Rex; he abducts Souffle and pressures her to marry him, but she refuses, saying he is lying. As children, Toby used the catchphrase "it is all for the sake of love" to hypnotize his friends Souffle (Primrose) and Syd. His parents were arrested by the Primroses for drug trafficking, after being reported by Syd, and they were murdered by the trafficker in retaliation for breaking up the deal. This also cleared Elio of suspicion and served as the beginning of Syd's career, but Toby blamed Syd for making him and Souffle orphans. Returning to the present, Souffle realizes that Zero was a planted identity to cover up Toby's actions; Syd reveals that he survived the ambush and when Tony tries to use the catchphrase, Mistcat intervenes. Elio and Hakua arrive to protect Souffle and prepare for the final confrontation between Toby and Syd. Toby sets off a massive firebomb and threatens Syd with guns, telling Syd the only way to get the key to Soufflé's cuffs is to kill him. Souffle kicks a bullet that would have killed Syd and he tells lovelorn Toby his parents turned themselves in to the authorities and confessed to their crimes, convinced they were not worthy of Toby's love; their last request was for Syd to take care of Toby. Souffle and Syd team up to rescue Toby for their friendship's sake and she confesses her love for Syd. Toby has a vision of his parents in jail and confesses his crimes. Souffle and Syd share a tender moment in their childhood flower field; he tells her that he plans to live a quiet life now that he has found his great love, but he is taken away by Elio, Lulu, and then Hakua in quick succession, and then is knocked unconscious as he is about to say who that is, leaving each involved convinced he loves her, and when he is about to clarify who he means, he hears of a new case and his body moves instinctively to solve it, continuing the story indefinitely.

=== Publication history ===
The chapters were originally serialized in Japanese in issues of Weekly Shōnen Jump.

== See also ==
- We Never Learn, another manga series by the same author
