= Irina: The Vampire Cosmonaut =

Japanese light novel series and its adaptations

- First light novel volume cover, featuring Irina Luminesk

月とライカと吸血姫 (Tsuki to Raika to Nosuferatu)
- Genre: Science fantasy
- Light novel
- Written by: Keisuke Makino
- Illustrated by: Karei
- Published by: Shogakukan
- English publisher: NA: Seven Seas Entertainment
- Imprint: Gagaga Bunko
- Original run: December 20, 2016 – October 19, 2021
- Volumes: 7
- Manga
- Written by: Keisuke Makino
- Illustrated by: Sojihogu
- Published by: Kodansha
- Imprint: Morning KC
- Magazine: Comic Days
- Original run: March 8, 2018 – March 3, 2023
- Volumes: 2
- Anime television series
- Directed by: Akitoshi Yokoyama
- Produced by: Naoko Itou; Shuuhou Kondou; Hajime Maruyama; Takahiro Yamakawa
- Written by: Keisuke Makino
- Music by: Yasunori Mitsuda
- Studio: Arvo Animation
- Licensed by: Crunchyroll: SA/SEA: Medialink
- Original network: TV Tokyo, BS NTV, SUN, KBS Kyoto
- Original run: October 4, 2021 – December 20, 2021
- Episodes: 12
- icon

Irina: The Vampire Cosmonaut (Japanese: 月とライカと吸血姫(ノスフェラトゥ), Hepburn: Tsuki to Raika to Nosuferatu; lit. 'The Moon, Laika, and the Nosferatu') is a Japanese science fantasy light novel series written by Keisuke Makino and illustrated by Karei. Shogakukan have published seven volumes since December 2016 under their Gagaga Bunko label. The light novel is licensed in North America by Seven Seas Entertainment under their Airship light novel imprint. A manga adaptation with art by Sojihogu was serialized online via Kodansha's Comic Days website from March 2018 to March 2023 and was collected in two tankōbon volumes. An anime television series adaptation by Arvo Animation aired from October to December 2021.

The novel is set in an alternate version of the post-World War II era. The rival superpowers of the Zirnitra Socialist Republics (this world's version of the Soviet Union) and the United Kingdom of Arnack (UK for short, this world's version the United States) have dominated planet Earth and have entered a space race which they view as the only option for their expansionist plans. The vampire girl Irina Luminesk is chosen for training as the first cosmonaut, while a young male cosmonaut candidate is assigned as her handler. While instructed to treat Irina impersonally as a mere test subject, he starts bonding with her and eventually falls for her.

== Plot ==
With the conclusion of World War II in 1945, the world is divided between two major superpowers: the Union of Zirnitra Socialist Republics [UZSR, the Zirnitra Union] (based on the Soviet Union) in the east and the United Kingdom of Arnack [UK] (based on the United States) in the west. With their borders set on earth, both superpowers look to space as the next frontier for expansion, sparking a space race. However, the Zirnitra Union has a trump card in the form of Irina Luminesk, a vampire whom they hope to use as a test subject to spearhead research into achieving the first human spaceflight. In order to ensure her training goes smoothly, the young cosmonaut candidate Lev Leps is assigned to be her handler. While he is instructed to treat Irina as nothing more than a test subject, Lev cannot help but be fascinated with the young vampire girl.

== Characters ==
Irina Luminesk (イリナ・ルミネスク, Irina Ruminesuku)
Voiced by: Megumi Hayashibara (Japanese); Tia Ballard (English)
A vampire girl. She is treated by people as a "cursed race" and hates humans. For some reason, she has a strong will to go to the Moon, and aims to become an astronaut. Over the course of the series, she slowly develops feelings towards Lev due to him treating her like a person.
Lev Leps (レフ・レプス, Refu Repusu)
Voiced by: Koki Uchiyama (Japanese); Stephen Fu (English)
A lieutenant in the Air Force. He has longed to fly since he was a child. He volunteered to be an astronaut candidate. He has a strong sense of justice and rebels against unreasonable things. Over the course of the series, he bonds with Irina, even letting her drink his blood, and falls in love with her. In episode 11, he realizes his dream and becomes the first human astronaut in the series.
Anya Simonyan (アーニャ・シモニャン, Ānya Shimonyan)
Voiced by: Hina Kino (Japanese); Jad Saxton (English)
A researcher at the Biomedical Research Institute. She specializes in studying the biology of vampires. She is in charge of checking Irina's medical data. For this reason, she is not afraid of Irina, and treats her in a friendly manner.
Mikhail Yashin (ミハイル・ヤシン, Mihairu Yashin)
Voiced by: Satoshi Hino (Japanese); Jonah Scott (English)
An astronaut candidate and a lieutenant in the Air Force. Handsome with a good family background. His grades are always at the top, and he plays a leading role. Acknowledged by himself and others as the most promising astronaut candidate.
Roza Plevitskaya (ローザ・プレヴィツカヤ, Rōza Purevuitsukaya)
Voiced by: Mikako Komatsu (Japanese); Kimmie Britt (English)
The only female astronaut candidate. A lieutenant in the Air Force. A former ace pilot who was called the "White Rose of Sunglade." She has a strong competitive spirit, and tends to be harsh to the other candidates around her.
Slava Korovin (スラヴァ・コローヴィン, Surava Korōvin)
Voiced by: Takaya Hashi (Japanese); Mark Stoddard (English)
A genius engineer who creates spaceships for the Republic of Zirnitra. His existence is kept secret from the public, and he is referred to only by his title, "Chief Designer."
Lieutenant Victor (ヴィクトール中将, Vikutōru Chūjō)
Voiced by: Masaki Terasoma (Japanese); Marcus Stimac (English)
An instructor of astronaut cadets and a hero of the last great war. A strong, muscular man with a large face. He is strict, but he is also very compassionate.
Natalia (ナタリア, Nataria)
Voiced by: Kikuko Inoue (Japanese); Caitlin Glass (English)
A matron of the communal dormitory where astronaut candidates live. With her gentle, maternal smile, she treats everyone with kindness.
Fjodor Gergiev (フョードル・ゲルギエフ, Fyōdoru Gerugiefu)
Voiced by: Kenichi Ogata (Japanese); Bill Jenkins (English)
A supreme leader of the Republic of Zirnitra. He came to this position after overthrowing the previous regime. While he has a cheerful and lively impression, he also has a side that silences those around him with a strong sense of intimidation and cold-heartedness.
Lyudmila Halrova (リュドミラ・ハルロヴァ, Ryudomira Harurova)
Voiced by: M.A.O (Japanese) Morgan Lauré Garrett (English)
A secretary in charge of documents for Fjodor Gergiev. A member of the old aristocracy, she is one of the few people who can give Gergiev opinions without hesitation. She always eats something sweet.
Narrator (ナレーション, Narēshon)
Voiced by: Hiroki Tōchi (Japanese); R. Bruce Elliot (English)
An unknown person who narrates the story.

== Media ==
=== Light novels ===
No.	Original release date	Original ISBN	English release date	English ISBN
1	December 20, 2016	978-4-09-451647-0	June 23, 2022 (Digital); August 9, 2022 (Physical)	978-1-63858-576-3
Prelude: прелюдия; Chapter 1: The Nosferatu and the Zilant; Chapter 2: The Path to Becoming a Cosmonaut; Chapter 3: Night Flight; Interlude: интерлюдия; Chapter 4: Blood Connection; Chapter 5: The Territory of the Gods; Coda: постлюдия
2	April 18, 2017	978-4-09-451672-2	September 1, 2022 (Digital); October 4, 2022 (Physical)	978-1-63858-700-2
Prelude: прелюдия; Chapter 1: The Nosferatu Project, Mission Complete; Chapter 2: A Maiden's Prayer; Chapter 3: The Final Cosmonaut Exam; Chapter 4: Further than the Moon; Chapter 5: A Cold Spring; Interlude: интерлюдия; Chapter 6: History's First Cosmonaut; Chapter 7: Hero of the Motherland; Chapter 8: To a New World; Coda: постлюдия; Second Movement: The Silver-Haired Vampire
3	February 20, 2018	978-4-09-451720-0	December 22, 2022 (Digital); January 3, 2023 (Physical)	978-1-63858-909-9
Prelude: Intro; Chapter 1: The Astronaut's Younger Brother and the Nosferatu Room Manager; Chapter 2: Arnack One; Chapter 3: Stargazing; Chapter 4: The Night of the Hurricane; Chapter 5: March of the Sun and the Moon; Coda: Outro
4	September 19, 2018	978-4-09-451752-1	March 16, 2023 (Digital); April 4, 2023 (Physical)	978-1-68579-632-7
Chapter 1: Queen of the Sun, Dragon of the Night; Chapter 2: The Long Road to the Moon; Chapter 3: Rulers; Chapter 4: The 21st Century Expo; Chapter 5: The Way to the Future; Coda: Outro; 3rd Movement: Vampire Princess and the Winged Dragon '63
5	August 21, 2019	978-4-09-451804-7	June 8, 2023 (Digital); July 4, 2023 (Physical)	978-1-68579-651-8
Prelude: прелюдия; Chapter 1: Afloat in a Sea of Stars; Chapter 2: The Goddess of the Moon; Chapter 3: For Whom?; Chapter 4: A Historic First Tragedy; Interlude: интерлюдия; Chapter 5: Last Hopes; Chapter 6: The Hunting Dogs
6	March 18, 2021	978-4-09-451886-3	August 3, 2023 (Digital); September 26, 2023 (Physical)	978-1-68579-927-4
Chapter 1: Project Soyuz Begins; Interlude 1; Chapter 2: Manned Lunar Orbit; Chapter 3: Foreign Countries; Interlude 2; Chapter 4: The Sorceress of the West; Interlude 3; Chapter 5: Where Hopes and Dreams Go
7	October 19, 2021	978-4-09-453037-7	December 21, 2023 (Digital); January 23, 2024 (Physical)	979-8-88843-125-2
Chapter 6: Vampires; Interlude 4; Chapter 7: Mission 3; Chapter 8: The Road to the Lunar Landing; Chapter 9: The Final Simulation; Chapter 10: Launch; Interlude 5; Chapter 11: The Lunar Landing

=== Manga ===
A manga adaptation with art by Sojihogu was serialized on Kodansha's Comic Days website from March 8, 2018, to March 3, 2023. It was collected in two tankōbon volumes. The adaptation went on an indefinite hiatus that lasted until January 2023 due to Sojihogu's poor health.

No.	Japanese release date	Japanese ISBN
1	November 14, 2018	978-4-06-513165-7
2	August 8, 2023	978-4-06-531660-3

=== Anime ===
An anime television series adaptation was announced on March 17, 2021. The series was animated by Arvo Animation and directed by Akitoshi Yokoyama, with series author Keisuke Makino handling series' composition, Hiromi Kato designing the characters, and Yasunori Mitsuda composing the score. It aired from October 4 to December 20, 2021, on TV Tokyo, BS NTV, SUN, and KBS Kyoto. (Note: TV Tokyo lists the series premiere at 25:35 on October 3, 2021, which is effectively 1:35 a.m. JST on October 4.) The opening theme song, "Hi no Tsuki" (緋ノ月, Scarlet Moon), is performed by Ali Project while the ending theme song, "Arifureta Itsuka" (ありふれたいつか, Everyday Someday), is performed by Chima. Funimation licensed the series outside of Asia. Medialink licensed the series in Asia-Pacific, it is streamed on the Ani-One YouTube channel with ULTRA membership, iQIYI, and Bilibili.

==== Episode list ====
No.	Title	Directed by (Note: Information is taken from the ending credits of each episode.)	Written by	Storyboarded by	Original release date
1	"The Nosferatu Project"; Transliteration: "Nosuferatu Keikaku" (Japanese: ノスフェラトゥ計画)	Masato Kitagawa	Keisuke Makino	Akitoshi Yokoyama	October 4, 2021
In the year 1957, the Republic of Zirnitra has humiliated its rival the United Kingdom of Arnak by staying ahead in the space race launching the first artificial satellite into space, launching a probe into the Moon's orbit, and putting a living dog in space. Now both nations are competing to achieve the first crewed spaceflight by putting a human in space. Lev Lep is a young man who has joined Zirnitra's space program in hopes of becoming a cosmonaut. However, due to a previous incident, his chances of being selected are low, so he is assigned to the "N Project". Due the desire of Zirnitra's leadership to broadcast their first crewed mission live, all potential risk to their cosmonauts must be eliminated. In order to achieve this, they plan to use a vampire, Irina Luminesk, as a test subject by secretly launching her into space ahead of the human mission. Lev is assigned to be Irina's handler, along with the young vampire researcher Anya Simonyan. Lev shows Irina around their training facility, LAIKA44, but she is treated coldly by the cosmonaut candidates due to her status as a vampire and she similarly shows little respect for humans. Lev reveals that the first dog Zirnitra put into space, Maly, was launched without any plans to retrieve it and died two hours after entering orbit, which Zirnitra covered up. Lev has trouble treating Irina as simply test subject, but Irina privately reminds herself that Zirnitra will not hesitate to execute her for any reason.
2	"The Path to Becoming a Cosmonaut"; Transliteration: "Uchū Hikōshi e no Michi" (Japanese: 宇宙飛行士への道)	Yoshitsugu Kimura	Keisuke Makino	Akitoshi Yokoyama	October 11, 2021
The next night, Lev begins Irina's training regimen, including running, physical examination, heat tolerance, G-force tolerance, and parachute training. However, during the parachute training, Lev discovers that Irina is afraid of heights. He also learns that vampires don't need to drink blood but enjoy the taste, though drinking human blood is a great taboo to them and they drink milk instead as a substitute. But during the Great Plague, vampires were made the scapegoats of the disease, which is where all of their negative stereotypes stemmed from. In order to cheer Irina up, Lev introduces her to soda water, which she immensely enjoys but won't admit it to him. Meanwhile, N Project leaders Slava Korovin and Lt. General Viktor discuss the progress of the project, with Korovin revealing he picked Lev to oversee Irina because he showed open respect for Maly's death, convincing Korovin that he was the right person to be paired with Irina despite his demotion to reserve status. Korovin also warns Viktor that not only will Arnack try to sabotage their project, but also rival factions within Zirnitra, as well. Elsewhere on the base, someone burns a picture of Irina.
3	"Night Flight"; Transliteration: "Yakan Hikō" (Japanese: 夜間飛行)	Yasuhiro Geshi	Takayo Ikami	Tsukasa Sunaga	October 18, 2021
In a meeting with the leader of Zirnitra, Gegriev, while Korovin reports the N Project is proceeding as planned, some government ministers call for Irina's immediate execution after the test flight. Gegriev is publicly ambivalent about the decision, but privately disagrees with wasting valuable manpower. Meanwhile, Irina's training continues, but her biggest weakness is her fear of heights, which prevents her from completing her parachute training. In order to solve this, Lev takes Irina on a plane flight, which serves to inspire her and helps alleviate her fears. Meanwhile, an ICBM test at Zirnitra's rocket launch facility in Albinar explodes, killing 500 people. While the incident is covered up, there is turmoil within the government as suspicions of sabotage are raised. Soon, Irina is able to take on more advanced parachute exercises. As her training continues, Lev begins to wonder what motivates her to undergo such harsh training to be a test subject. Meanwhile, Irina promises to herself that she won't lose no matter what, even if it costs her life.
4	"A Promise by the Lake"; Transliteration: "Mizuumi no Chikai" (Japanese: 湖の誓い)	Masato Kitagawa	Akitoshi Yokoyama	Toshikatsu Tokoro	October 25, 2021 (Note: This episode aired at 1:45 a.m. JST, 10 minutes after the original air time on TV Tokyo.)
While Irina's training progresses smoothly, there are issues in the development of the test rocket as more safety features need to be removed to meet the upcoming deadline. Korovin also is not in good health as he tries to personally oversee the construction. Irina's next training is to undergo a solitude test in a anechoic altitude chamber. Lev recommends that Irina try something relaxing before the test to better prepare for it, and she decides to accompany him to the jazz bar he likes to frequent. After having some drinks, Lev tells Irina that he was fascinated by space since he was a child. He then takes Irina to the lake so she can ice skate. During a break, Irina reveals her parents were killed in the World War, and she has always been fascinated with the Moon. She admits she volunteered for the Nosferatu Project because she wanted to reach space before humans do, even if it costs her life. Lev promises to make sure she will reach space. The next day, Irina has no memories of the previous night due to being drunk, and she proceeds to her solitude training.
5	"Training Separately"; Transliteration: "Hanarebanare no Kunren" (Japanese: 離ればなれの訓練)	Hiromichi Matano	Takayo Ikami	Toshiharu Kudō; Akitoshi Yokoyama	November 1, 2021 (Note: This episode aired at 2:10 a.m. JST, 35 minutes after the original air time on TV Tokyo.)
While Irina is in the anechoic chamber, Lev returns to his usual training routine. Zirnitra's leadership sends Lyudmila Kharlova to inspect the site and the cosmonaut candidates. With Arnak having already announced its selected astronauts, Zirnitra is pressured to choose six candidates to be its official cosmonauts. Lyudmila assures everybody that the project is still on schedule and ahead of Arnack's space program. She also privately reminds Lev that Irina is a vampire and therefore not considered human. After Irina's solitude training is concluded, Lev puts her back on parachute training and she's able to perform a solo parachute drop. However, during training, they witness the reentry module for a test rocket crash nearby. Korovin explains that the rocket successfully reached orbit, but malfunctioned during reentry forcing them to remote detonate it. Zirnitran leadership orders Korovin to install a similar self destruct feature in Irina's rocket to prevent it falling into enemy hands. When Lev and Irina investigate the crash site, Irina sees the corpse of the test dog and goes into shock.
6	"Nosferatu"; Transliteration: "Nosuferatu" (Japanese: 吸血姫(ノスフェラトゥ))	Taishi Kawaguchi	Keisuke Makino	Nagisa Miyazaki	November 8, 2021
After having a nightmare about dying like the test dog at the rocket crash site, Irina's performance in training begins to decline considerably. Worried, Lev takes her to the infirmary, where it's revealed that Irina is suffering from anemia. With human treatments seemingly having no effect on her, Lev figures that Irina needs to drink blood to regain her strength. Unwilling to let Irina's dream slip away, Lev offers to let Irina drink his blood, which she agrees to. Afterwards, her strength returns, and she asks how Lev deals with the fear of an accident, and he reassures her by telling her their dreams should be something they'd be willing to risk their own lives for. With less than a week before the test flight, Korovin's requests to delay the launch a month to improve safety features is denied, and he is ordered to install a self destruct system in case the reentry module risks landing outside Zirnitra's borders. During G-force training, Lev's friend Franz secretly sabotages the training machine in an effort to kill Irina. Lev manually shuts down the machine to save her, earning the ire of Sagalevich, who begins beating Irina with his garlic necklace. When Lev intervenes and intimidates him, he's arrested for assault of a superior officer. With the launch only a few days away, Irina must travel to the launch site at Albinar without Lev.
7	"Lycoris Cooking Show"; Transliteration: "Rikorisu no Ryōri Shō" (Japanese: リコリスの料理ショー)	Toshiya Niidome	Keisuke Makino	Tsukasa Sunaga	November 15, 2021
Lev is freed from confinement after an investigation reveals that Franz sabotaged the G-force training machine, though Franz himself is arrested and removed from his position. It's also revealed that the lunchlady he is acquainted with, Natalia, is in fact a member of Zirnitra's secret police who has been keeping an eye on him Irina. He is able to attend the test launch, where Irina is give instructions to recite a recipe as a code in case her radio transmissions are intercepted by Arnak. She is either recite a borscht recipe if she feels no ill effects, or a cheeseburger recipe if something has gone wrong. While communications are briefly lost, the launch goes as planned and Irina is able to reach Earth's orbit. While in space, Irina is happy she's reached space, but sadly realizes she may never actually reach the Moon. The space capsule then reenters the atmosphere but goes off course, missing the designated landing zone. Lev joins the search and rescue efforts and manages to find Irina safe and sound, and warmly welcomes her back to Earth.
8	"A Maiden's Prayer"; Transliteration: "Otome no Inori" (Japanese: 乙女の祈り)	Yoshitsugu Kimura	Kurasumi Sunayama	Tsukasa Sunaga	November 22, 2021
With the test launch a success, Korovin and his team celebrate and congratulate Irina. The government decides to postpone the issue of Irina's disposal until a thorough medical exam to search for any long term health effects is completed. Lev is also reinstated as a cosmonaut candidate, giving him a chance to be the first human in space. However, with the Nosferatu Project concluded, Lev is relieved as Irina's caretaker leaving Anya as her sole guardian. Irina and Anya celebrate New Year's Eve together while Lev concentrates on his cosmonaut training. However, he can't stop thinking about Irina. Lev does manage to visit Irina one night, organizing their own private celebration for being the first cosmonaut. When Irina asks if he has passed the graduation exam, he replies that he doesn't know yet.
9	"The White Rose of Sangrad"; Transliteration: "Sangurādo no Shirobara" (Japanese: サングラードの白薔薇)	Daisuke Kurose	Takayo Ikami	Toshikatsu Tokoro	November 29, 2021
Arnak manages to successfully launch a chimpanzee into space and recover it safely, showing that they are quickly catching up to Zirnitra in the space race. The worried Zirnitran government puts additional pressure on Korovin to get their first manned flight ready as soon as possible. At LAIKA44, Lev is chosen as one of the three cosmonauts along with Mikhail Yashin and Roza Plevitskaya that will participate in their first manned space flight. However, training continues as the regimen is adapted according to data gained from Irina's flight, and there is still the question of who will be designated the lead cosmonaut, though Mikhail is the expected frontrunner. During a parachute training test, Roza loses focus and enters a dangerous spin, which Lev risks his life to save her from. Afterwards, Roza confides in Lev that she had to become hypercompetitive in order to overcome her male rivals, which earned her the nickname "The White Rose of Sangrad". Irina sees Lev talking with Roza and decides to avoid him, and narrowly avoids being run over by a rogue Zirnitran agent who is secretly caught and executed by Natalia. The next day, Lev visits Irina who reveals she will be transferred to Sangrad in two days, so they agree to meet one last time for a farewell party the next evening.
10	"A Cold Spring"; Transliteration: "Tsumetai Haru" (Japanese: 冷たい春)	Masayuki Iimura	Kurasumi Sunayama	Toshikatsu Tokoro	December 6, 2021
Lev and Irina spend their last night together before Irina leaves for Sangrad, and Irina once again makes Lev promise that he will become the first human in space. However, the next day, both Lev and Mikhail are taken to Sangrad to pose for publicity photos, revealing that they are the final two candidates to be the first cosmonaut in space. Irina happens to catch sight of Lev and heads over to greet him, only to be stopped by government agents who forbid them to meet. It's later revealed that Irina is being kept confined to a lab for more medical tests, with Irina likely to be disposed of if the human spaceflight is a success. Meanwhile, Gergiev picks who will be the first cosmonaut, and then wonders what to do with Irina. Lyudmila then intercedes and suggests that instead of disposing of her like their political rivals want, they should use her as a weapon for their own political ends. Later, Viktor announces that Lev has been chosen to be the first cosmonaut, much to Lev's joy, and he chooses the callsign "Aster" as a way to tell Irina he hopes she is doing well.
11	"Lies and Truths"; Transliteration: "Uso to Shinjitsu" (Japanese: 嘘と真実)	Toshikatsu Tokoro	Takayo Ikami	Shinsaku Sasaki	December 13, 2021
On the day of the launch, Lev prepares to be sent to space. During a conversation with Korovin, Lev is shocked to learn that Irina lied about joining the Design Bureau, though Korovin promises to do everything in his power to help her. The launch ends up being a success, and Lev becomes the first human to fly in space and mass celebrations are held all across Zirnitra. Through coded phrases Lev gives through his broadcasts, Irina is able to hear and recognize that Lev has not forgotten about her, but she has mixed feelings about Lev being hailed as the first cosmonaut. After the conclusion of the space flight and Lev's return to Earth, he is immediately made to attend numerous social functions now that he is a national hero. As he tries to draft the speech he will make in front of all of Zirnitra, Lyudmila reminds him that with his status as a hero, he has the power to stage a revolution and lead the people towards a new world. Meanwhile, numerous factions within the government begin making plans on how to take advantage of Lev and Irina. At the lab, Anya reveals that she is being removed as Irina's caretaker, but starts making her own plan to reunite Irina with Lev.
12	"To the New World"; Transliteration: "Shin Sekai e" (Japanese: 新世界へ)	Taishi Kawaguchi; Honami Inamura	Keisuke Makino	Tsukasa Sunaga; Akitoshi Yokoyama	December 20, 2021 (Note: This episode aired at 2:34 a.m. JST, 59 minutes after the original air time on TV Tokyo.)
Lev arrives in Sangrad to give his speech to the nation. Meanwhile, Anya knocks out the guards in the lab and helps Irina escape so they can go see Lev. Shortly after, government agents looking to eliminate Irina arrive at the lab only to find her missing. Lev initially gives a standard speech that doesn't mention Irina, and she loses heart and decides to return to the lab. However, Lev changes his speech and instead publicly reveals Irina's existence and that she is in fact the first cosmonaut. Inspired, Irina manages to storm the stage with Lev's help while Gegriev halts any attempt to stop them. Despite initial hostility from the crowd, Irina gives her own speech, expressing how Lev helped achieve her dream of reaching space before humans, and now her new dream is to go to the Moon together with him. This stuns the crowd, and Gegriev takes the chance to craft a new narrative, claiming that Irina was supposed to be present but was hampered by secret police. He then publicly chastises his political enemies and foreign nations like Arnack that still discriminate against vampires and announces he plans to reform Zirnitra and eliminate its authoritarian measures. After the celebration, Lev realizes that Gegriev and Lyudmila planned for him to reveal Irina's existence, and that Korovin threatened to resign from the Design Bureau if Irina was killed. Despite being uncomfortable at being used as a political pawn, Lev still looks forward with Irina to the day that Zirnitra and Arnack can overcome their differences and explore space together. Brief shots of the future show Arnack continuing with its own space program, and both Arnack and Zirnitran astronauts, consisting of both humans and vampires, peacefully coexisting on an orbital space station.

== Reception ==
Irina: The Vampire Cosmonaut was awarded the 53rd Seiun Award in the Best Japanese Long Story category in 2022.
