= Sayumi Suzushiro =

Japanese voice actress

- 鈴代 紗弓
- Born: February 4, 1998 (age 28); Kanagawa Prefecture, Japan
- Occupation: Voice actress
- Years active: 2017–present
- Agent: Arts Vision
- Notable work: Hi Score Girl as Akira Ono; The Magnificent Kotobuki as Kylie; We Never Learn as Uruka Takemoto; Do You Love Your Mom and Her Two-Hit Multi-Target Attacks? as Wise; Monster Girl Doctor as Illy; Kaguya-sama: Love Is War as Kei Shirogane; 86 as Kurena Kukumila; In the Heart of Kunoichi Tsubaki as Asagao; Bocchi the Rock! as Nijika Ijichi; You and I Are Polar Opposites as Miyu Suzuki

Sayumi Suzushiro (鈴代 紗弓, Suzushiro Sayumi; born February 4, 1998) is a Japanese voice actress from Kanagawa Prefecture who is affiliated with Arts Vision. She played her first main role in 2018 as Akira Ono in the anime television series Hi Score Girl. She is also known for her roles as Kylie in The Magnificent Kotobuki, Uruka Takemoto in We Never Learn, and Wise in Do You Love Your Mom and Her Two-Hit Multi-Target Attacks?. In 2020, she received the Best Rookie Award at the 14th Seiyu Awards.

== Filmography ==
=== Anime ===
Year	Title	Role
2017	Aoharu x Machinegun	Yūka
2017	Love Live! Sunshine!!	Female student
2017	Classicaloid	Woman, employee
2017	Konohana Kitan	Female kin
2018	Hi Score Girl	Akira Ono
2018	Gundam Build Divers	Lip
2018	Yuuna and the Haunted Hot Springs	Woman
2018	The Girl in Twilight	School broadcast, Matsu Akiko
2018	Bloom Into You	Serizawa
2019	The Magnificent Kotobuki	Kylie
2019	Kaguya-sama: Love Is War	Kei Shirogane
2019	We Never Learn	Uruka Takemoto
2019	Do You Love Your Mom and Her Two-Hit Multi-Target Attacks?	Wise
2019	Hi Score Girl II	Akira Ono
2019	Rifle Is Beautiful	Reina Serena
2020	A Certain Scientific Railgun T	Rakko Yumiya
2020	Kaguya-sama: Love Is War?	Kei Shirogane
2020	Monster Girl Doctor	Ily
2020	The Misfit of Demon King Academy	Himka Houra
2021	86	Kurena Kukumila
2021	Seirei Gensouki: Spirit Chronicles	Christina Beltrum
2021	That Time I Got Reincarnated as a Slime	Nine-Head
2021	2.43: Seiin High School Boys Volleyball Team	Kei Suemori
2021	Blue Reflection Ray	Kana Sugiura
2022	The Strongest Sage with the Weakest Crest	Lurie
2022	Requiem of the Rose King	Lady Anne Neville
2022	The Dawn of the Witch	Holt
2022	Kaguya-sama: Love Is War -Ultra Romantic-	Kei Shirogane
2022	In the Heart of Kunoichi Tsubaki	Asagao
2022	Shine Post	Haru Nabatame
2022	Bocchi the Rock!	Nijika Ijichi
2022	Mobile Suit Gundam: The Witch from Mercury	Renee Costa
2023	Blue Lock	Sena Naruhaya (ep 15)
2023	Don't Toy with Me, Miss Nagatoro 2nd Attack	Hana Sunomiya
2023	KonoSuba: An Explosion on This Wonderful World!	Dodonko
2023	The Café Terrace and Its Goddesses	Ami Tsuruga
2023	Undead Girl Murder Farce	Annie Kerber
2023	My Tiny Senpai	Aiko Yamagishi
2023	Umamusume: Pretty Derby 3rd Season	Satono Crown
2023	A Returner's Magic Should Be Special	Romantica Eru
2023	Shy	Lady Black
2023	Sacrificial Princess and the King of Beasts	Richard (ep 24)
2023	The Vexations of a Shut-In Vampire Princess	Villhaze
2024	Frieren: Beyond Journey's End	Lawine
2024	The Unwanted Undead Adventurer	Rina Rupaage
2024	A Condition Called Love	Satomi Satomura
2024	Tasūketsu	Hikari Ebina
2024	2.5 Dimensional Seduction	Nonoa
2024	Dungeon People	Belle
2024	The Elusive Samurai	Ayako
2024	Fairy Tail: 100 Years Quest	Touka, Faris
2024	No Longer Allowed in Another World	Tama
2024	Why Does Nobody Remember Me in This World?	Saki
2024	Blue Archive	Noa Ushio (ep 8)
2024	The Stories of Girls Who Couldn't Be Magicians	Sally Andol
2025	I Got Married to the Girl I Hate Most in Class	Himari Ishikura
2025	Even Given the Worthless "Appraiser" Class, I'm Actually the Strongest	Ursula
2025	Can a Boy-Girl Friendship Survive?	Himari Inuzuka
2025	Kowloon Generic Romance	Xiaohei
2025	Zatsu Tabi: That's Journey	Koyomi Hasunuma
2025	My Hero Academia: Vigilantes	Yuu
2025	Welcome to the Outcast's Restaurant!	Henrietta
2025	My Friend's Little Sister Has It In for Me!	Iroha Kohinata
2026	Wash It All Away	Wakana Kinme
2026	Tune In to the Midnight Heart	Iko Kirino
2026	An Adventurer's Daily Grind at Age 29	Rirui
2026	The Holy Grail of Eris	Scarlett Castiel
2026	You and I Are Polar Opposites	Miyu Suzuki
2026	High School! Kimengumi	Pochi
2026	Haibara's Teenage New Game+	Yuino Nanase
2026	I Made Friends with the Second Prettiest Girl in My Class	Yū Amami
2026	Botan Kamiina Fully Blossoms When Drunk	Botan Kamiina
2026	Mistress Kanan Is Devilishly Easy	Jeanne
2026	The Barbarian's Bride	Serafina de Lavillant
2026	Thunder 3	Pyontarō
2026	Sparks of Tomorrow	Chiemi Sakamoto
2026	Magical Girl Raising Project: Restart	Genopsyko Yumenoshima
2026	Full Clearing Another World Under a Goddess with Zero Believers	Sofia
2026	So What's Wrong with Getting Reborn as a Goblin?	Eirene
2026	Dandivine	Karen Shinonome
2026	Reincarnated as a Sword	Serimea
2027	Are You a Landmine, Chihara-san?	Mai Chihara
2027	Now That We Draw	Niina Miyamoto
2027	Nue's Exorcist	Kazusa Suo
2027	Studio Cabana	Yukari Maki

=== Film ===
Year	Title	Role
2019	KonoSuba: God's Blessing on This Wonderful World! Legend of Crimson	Dodonko
2020	High School Fleet: The Movie	Keiko Nogiwa
2026	Chiikawa the Movie: The Secret of the Mermaid Island	Futaba
2027	Eiga Bocchi the Rock! Hoshi no Ashiato	Nijika Ijichi

=== Video games ===
Year	Title	Role
2019	Azur Lane	U-101
2020	Atelier Ryza 2: Lost Legends & the Secret Fairy	Cassandra Cappelli
2021	Arknights	Jackie
2022	Hyperdimension Neptunia: Sisters vs. Sisters	Maho
2022	Dead or Alive Xtreme Venus Vacation	Amy
2022	Blue Archive	Noa Ushio
2023	Umamusume: Pretty Derby	Satono Crown
2023	Street Fighter 6	Yua
2023	Master Detective Archives: Rain Code	Shinigami
2023	Path to Nowhere	Lynn
2023	Genshin Impact	Kirara
2023	Rear Sekai	Tatta
2023	Magia Record	Amaryllis
2023	Honkai: Star Rail	Hanya
2023	The Seven Deadly Sins: Grand Cross	Hel
2023	Tevi	Caprice
2024	Fate/Grand Order	Andromeda
2024	Iwakura Aria	Ichiko Kitagawa
2024	Azur Lane	Napoli
2025
2025	Trails in the Sky 1st Chapter	Aina Holden
2025	Shine Post: Be Your Idol!	Haru Nabatame
2025	D.C. Re:tune	Moe Mizukoshi
2026	Arknights: Endfield	Chen Qianyu
2026	Kyoto Xanadu	Sena Nakiri
2026	The Adventures of Elliot: The Millennium Tales	Marnie
2026	Strinova	Nora
2026	Echoes of Aincrad	Saayu
2026	Demon's Night Fever	Maria Shakado
