= Super Psychic Policeman Chojo =

Japanese manga series

- First tankōbon volume cover, featuring Meguru Chojo (center) and Nao Ippongi (left)

超巡！超条先輩 (Chōjun! Chōjō Senpai)
- Genre: Buddy cop; Comedy
- Manga
- Written by: Shun Numa
- Published by: Shueisha
- English publisher: NA: Viz Media
- Imprint: Jump Comics
- Magazine: Weekly Shōnen Jump
- Original run: February 13, 2024 – June 9, 2025
- Volumes: 8
- Anime television series
- Directed by: Junichi Yamamoto
- Written by: Hayashi Mori
- Studio: Arvo Animation
- Licensed by: Crunchyroll: SEA: Medialink
- Original network: FNS (Kansai TV, Fuji TV)
- Original run: October 6, 2026 – present
- Episodes: 5
- icon

Super Psychic Policeman Chojo (Japanese: 超巡！超条先輩, Hepburn: Chōjun! Chōjō Senpai) is a Japanese manga series written and illustrated by Shun Numa. It was serialized in Shueisha's Weekly Shōnen Jump magazine from February 2024 to June 2025; as of September 2025, eight volumes have been released. An anime television series adaptation produced by Arvo Animation premiered in October 2026.

== Plot ==
Rookie police officer, Nao Ippongi, is assigned to the West Chinjuku Police Station. There, she is assigned to work with senior police officer Meguru Chojo, who can use super psychic powers but is despised by everyone in the station due to his lazy and self-centered personality, and the two of them start working together to keep the peace in the town, solve crimes and deal with the eccentric townsfolk.

== Characters ==
Meguru Chojo (超条巡, Chojo Meguru)
Voiced by: Yūsuke Kobayashi
Nao Ippongi (一本木直, Ippongi Nao)
Voiced by: Riko Aono
Robo-kun (ローボくん)
Voiced by: Maria Naganawa
Yuki Inukai (犬養由基, Inukai Yuki)
Voiced by: Daisuke Ono
Hajime Keinain (恵那院肇, Keinain Hajime)
Voiced by: Toshiya Miyata
Hossan (ホッさん)
Voiced by: Nobuaki Kanemitsu
Lily Togari (尖里リリ, Togari Riri)
Voiced by: Kanna Nakamura
Heisuke Ban (伴平助, Ban Heisuke)
Voiced by: Kazuki Ura

== Media ==
=== Manga ===
Written and illustrated by Shun Numa, the series began publication as a one-shot, which was published in Shueisha's Weekly Shōnen Jump magazine on April 24, 2023. The one-shot was turned into a full series, which was serialized in Weekly Shōnen Jump from February 13, 2024, to June 9, 2025. As of September 2025, the series' individual chapters have been collected into eight tankōbon volumes.

Viz Media and Manga Plus are publishing the series in English simultaneously with its Japanese release.

==== Volumes ====
No.	Original release date	Original ISBN	English release date	English ISBN
1	June 4, 2024	978-4-08-884108-3	January 6, 2026	978-1-9747-6180-7
01. "The Psychic Senior Police Officer" (超能力巡査長, Chō Nōryoku Junsa-chō); 02. "The Cat-Hunting Senior Police Officer" (猫探し巡査長, Neko Sagashi Junsa-chō); 03. "The Senior Police Officer Duelist" (決闘者巡査長, Dyuerisuto Junsa-chō); 04. "The Gofer Senior Police Officer" (パシリ巡査長, Pashiri Junsa-chō); 05. "The Speed Demon Senior Police Officer" (爆走巡査長, Bakusō Junsa-chō); 06. "The Senior Police Officer Who Reads Texts but Doesn't Reply" (既読無視巡査長, Kidoku Mushi Junsa-chō); 07. "The Quizzed Senior Police Officer" (クイズ! 巡査長, Kuizu! Junsa-chō)
2	September 4, 2024	978-4-08-884172-4	March 3, 2026	978-1-9747-5784-8
08. "Tailing the Senior Police Officer" (追跡! 巡査長, Tsuiseki! Junsa-chō); 09. "The Convenience Store Senior Police Officer" (コンビニ巡査長, Konbini Junsa-chō); 10. "The Adolescent Senior Police Officer" (思春期巡査長, Shishunki Junsa-chō); 11. "The Off-Duty Senior Police Officer" (非番の巡査長, Hiban no Junsa-chō); 12. "The Food Stall-Guard Senior Police Officer" (出店警察巡査長, Shutten Keisatsu Junsa-chō); 13. "The Festival Senior Police Officer" (お祭り巡査長, Omatsuri Junsa-chō); 14. "The Somchai Senior Police Officer" (ソムチャイ巡査長, Somuchai Junsa-chō); 15. "The Transforming Senior Police Officer" (変身! 巡査長, Henshin! Junsa-chō); 16. "The Sunday Morning Senior Police Officer" (日曜朝巡査長, Nichiyō asa Junsa-chō)
3	November 1, 2024	978-4-08-884255-4	May 5, 2026	978-1-9747-6324-5
17. "The Noob-Hunting Senior Police Officer" (初狩り巡査長, Hatsu Kari Junsa-chō); 18. "The Senior Police Officer's Rival" (ライバル巡査長, Raibaru Junsa-chō); 19. "The Alumni Senior Police Officer" (OB巡査長, OB Junsa-chō); 20. "Farewell, Senior Police Officer" (さよなら巡査長, Sayonara Junsa-chō); 21. "The Watchdog Senior Police Officer" (見守り巡査長, Mimamori Junsa-chō); 22. "Blaze On, Senior Police Officer!" (燃え上がれ巡査長, Moeagare Junsa-chō); 23. "The Spine-Tingling Senior Police Officer" (世にも奇妙な巡査長, Yonimokimyōna Junsa-chō); 24. "The Flower-Peddling Senior Police Officer" (お花屋巡査長, O Hanaya Junsa-chō); 25. "The Suppressed Senior Police Officer" (抑制! 巡査長, Yokusei! Junsa-chō)
4	February 4, 2025	978-4-08-884403-9	July 7, 2026	978-1-9747-6452-5
26. "The Bored Senior Police Officer" (暇した巡査長, Hima Shita Junsa-chō); 27. "The True Story of the Police Officer" (実録巡査長, Jitsuroku Junsa-chō); 28. "The Senior Police Officer in Love" (恋をしたのは巡査長, Koi o Shita no wa Junsa-chō); 29. "The Family Court Senior Police Officer" (係争巡査長, Keisō Junsa-chō); 30. "A Veggie Senior Police Officer" (お野菜巡査長, O Yasai Junsa-chō); 31. "The Gorilla and the Senior Police Officer" (ゴリラ巡査長, Gorira Junsa-chō); 32. "The Idol Senior Police Officer" (アイドル巡査長, Aidoru Junsa-chō); 33. "The Senior Police Officer Named Andre" (アンドレ巡査長, Andore Junsa-chō); 34. "The Unlucky Pervert Senior Police Officer" (アンラッキースケベ巡査長, Anrakkī Sukebe Junsa-chō)
5	May 2, 2025	978-4-08-884513-5	September 1, 2026	978-1-9747-6583-6
35. "The Unsavory Senior Police Officer" (悪い巡査虫巡査長, Warui Junsa Mushi Junsa-chō); 36. "The Senior Police Officer's Video Letter" (「ビデオレター」巡査長, "Bideo Retā" Junsa-chō); 37. "The Outbreak Senior Police Officer" (アウトブレイク巡査長, Autobureiku Junsa-chō); 38. "Thank You For Being Born, Senior Police Officer" (生まれてきてくれてありがとう巡査長, Umarete Kite Kurete Arigatō Kunsa-chō); 39. "The Left-Behind Senior Police Officer" (置いてけぼり巡査長, Oitekebori Junsa-chō); 40. "The Lewd Senior Police Officer" (ハレンチ巡査長, Harenchi Junsa-chō); 41. "Senior Police Officer and Master Detective" (名探偵巡査長, Mei Tantei Junsa-chō); 42. "The Curry-Loving Senior Police Officer" (カレー大好き巡査長, Karē Daisuki Junsa-chō); 43. "The Split-Up Senior Police Officer" (分裂! 巡査長, Bunretsu! Junsa-chō)
6	July 4, 2025	978-4-08-884568-5	November 3, 2026	978-1-9747-1653-1
44. "The Senior Police Officer's BFF" (心の友巡査長, Kokoro no Tomo Junsa-chō); 45. "The Senior Police Officer's Collaboration" (コラボ巡査長, Korabo Junsa-chō); 46. "The Cursed Senior Police Officer" (呪いの巡査長, Noroi no Junsa-chō); 47. "The Solo Karaoke Senior Police Officer" (ヒトカラ巡査長, Hitokara Junsa-chō); 48. "The Senior Police Officer's Cool-Guy Transformation" (イケメン化巡査長, Ikemen-ka Junsa-chō); 49. "The Previous Series' Main Character" (前作主人公, Zensaku Shujinkō); 50. "The Personality Quiz and the Senior Police Officer" (心理テスト巡査長, Shinri Tesuto Junsa-chō); 51. "The Entertaining Senior Police Officer" (接待巡査長, Settai Junsa-chō)
7	September 4, 2025	978-4-08-884658-3	January 5, 2027	978-1-9747-6658-1
52. "The Snack-Loving Senior Police Officer" (駄菓子大好き巡査長, Dagashi Daisuki Junsa-chō); 53. "Dating the Senior Police Officer" (デキてる巡査長, Deki teru Junsa-chō); 54. "The Senior Police Officer and His Peer" (同期の巡査長, Dōki no Junsa-chō); 55. "The Godkiller Senior Police Officer" (神をも殺す巡査長, Kami o mo Korosu Junsa-chō); 56. "The Five-Star Senior Police Officer" (五ツ星巡査長, Itsutsu Hoshi Junsa-chō); 57. "The Asparagus Senior Police Officer" (アスパラ巡査長, Asupara Junsa-chō); 58. "The After-Party Senior Police Officer" (二次会巡査長, Nijikai Junsa-chō)
8	September 4, 2025	978-4-08-884733-7	—	—
59. "The Senior Police Officer's Okizeme" (起き攻め巡査長, Okizeme Junsa-chō); 60. "The Senior Police Officer on a Date" (アベック巡査長, Abekku Junsa-chō); 61. "The Senior Police Officer on Monday" (月曜日巡査長, Getsuyōbi Junsa-chō); 62. "Another Senior Police Officer" (もう一人の巡査長, Mōhitori no Junsa-chō); 63. "The Early Summer Senior Police Officer" (初夏の巡査長, Shoka no Junsa-chō); 64. "The Unforgettable Senior Police Officer" (忘れ得ぬ巡査長, Wasureenu Junsa-chō); 65. "The Future Senior Police Officer" (未来の巡査長, Mirai no Junsa-chō)

=== Anime ===
An anime television series adaptation was announced on October 13, 2025. It will be produced by Arvo Animation and directed by Junichi Yamamoto, with series composition and screenplays by Hayashi Mori and characters designed by Masakatsu Sasaki. The series premiered on October 6, 2026, on the Ka-Anival!! programming block on Kansai TV, Fuji TV, and their affiliates. The opening theme song is "That's! Chojo" (ザッツ！超常), performed by Milk, and the ending theme song is "Mata Ashita" (またあした; 'See You Tomorrow'), performed by Shifuku Poncho. Crunchyroll is streaming the series. Medialink licensed the series in Southeast Asia for streaming on Ani-One Asia's YouTube channel.

== Reception ==
By October 2025, the manga had over 300,000 copies in circulation. Brian Salvatore of Multiversity Comics praised the characters and story, though he felt the story can also be too "over the top". Kittun Nozomi of Real Sound noted similarities in the characters and their interactions to Numa's previous works. The series was recommended by Jujutsu Kaisen creator Gege Akutami. The series ranked sixth in the print category at the tenth Next Manga Awards in 2024. It was ranked third in the 2025 edition in the same category.
