= We Never Learn =

Japanese manga series and its adaptations

- First tankōbon volume cover, featuring (from left to right) Fumino Furuhashi, Rizu Ogata, and Uruka Takemoto

ぼくたちは勉強ができない (Bokutachi wa Benkyō ga Dekinai)
- Genre: Harem; Romantic comedy; Slice of life
- Manga
- Written by: Taishi Tsutsui
- Published by: Shueisha
- English publisher: NA: Viz Media
- Imprint: Jump Comics
- Magazine: Weekly Shōnen Jump
- English magazine: NA: Weekly Shonen Jump
- Original run: February 6, 2017 – December 21, 2020
- Volumes: 21
- Light novel
- Written by: HamuBane
- Illustrated by: Taishi Tsutsui
- Published by: Shueisha
- Imprint: Jump J-Books
- Original run: April 4, 2019 – December 4, 2019
- Volumes: 2
- Anime television series

We Never Learn: Bokuben
- Directed by: Yoshiaki Iwasaki
- Produced by: Nobuhiro Nakayama; Kozue Kaneniwa; Tomoyuki Oowada; Kazumasa Sanjouba
- Written by: Gō Zappa
- Music by: Masato Nakayama
- Studio: Studio Silver; Arvo Animation
- Licensed by: NA: Aniplex of America; SEA: Muse Communication
- Original network: Tokyo MX, GTV, GYT, BS11, AT-X, MBS, TVA
- Original run: April 7, 2019 – December 29, 2019
- Episodes: 26 + 2 OVAs
- icon

We Never Learn (Japanese: ぼくたちは勉強ができない, Hepburn: Bokutachi wa Benkyō ga Dekinai; lit. "We Can't Study"), also known as BokuBen (ぼく勉), is a Japanese manga series written and illustrated by Taishi Tsutsui. It was serialized in Shueisha's shōnen manga magazine Weekly Shōnen Jump from February 2017 to December 2020, with its individual chapters collected and published by Shueisha in twenty-one tankōbon volumes. The series follows the story of Nariyuki Yuiga, a high school student tasked with tutoring three female geniuses as they start to gradually develop romantic feelings for him.

An anime television series adaptation produced by Studio Silver and Arvo Animation aired from April to June 2019. A second season aired from October to December of the same year. The manga also spawned two light novel spin-offs released in 2019.

Viz Media licensed the manga in North America and serialized it in their digital Weekly Shonen Jump magazine and started releasing it in print in 2018. Shueisha simultaneously published the series in English on the website and app Manga Plus in January 2019. The anime series is licensed by Aniplex of America.

== Plot ==
Nariyuki Yuiga is a senior high school student attending Ichinose Academy who, in order to secure a university scholarship, must tutor three female geniuses in different subjects: Fumino Furuhashi is a genius in humanities, but horrible at science and mathematics; Rizu Ogata is a genius in science and mathematics, but terrible at humanities; and Uruka Takemoto is a genius on the athletic field, but dreadful in academics. As the girls work with Nariyuki to achieve their academic goals, they must also deal with their growing feelings for him. As the story progresses, two other girls are focused upon: Mafuyu Kirisu, their teacher who despite her professionalism, is a slob at home, and Asumi Kominami, a rōnin who has the appearance of a middle schooler despite her age.

Near the middle of the story, at the Ichinose School Festival, rumor has it that people who are touching when the first firework goes off are destined to become a couple. During this event, Nariyuki encounters one of the girls, but her identity is obscured upon the chapter's first release. The story has five separate endings with Nariyuki ending up with one of the five girls. While their endings vary, the focused girl is the one who Nariyuki encountered at the fireworks. The final chapter shows instead another continuity where all the girls, including various secondary characters, end up touching Nariyuki during the festival, and the fireworks school legend is revealed to have been created by Nariyuki's late father in his youth. Flashes of the other endings are seen by the girls, signifying that in this new reality, any of the events leading up to them have the same probability to occur.

== Characters ==
Nariyuki Yuiga (唯我 成幸, Yuiga Nariyuki)
Voiced by: Ryōta Ōsaka
A third-year student. In order to provide for his poor family, Nariyuki seeks to obtain his school's special VIP nomination, a scholarship which waives all future university tuition fees. He receives the nomination, but is given the arduous task of getting three fellow classmates into their universities of choice. His focus on studies was inspired by his late father, who died shortly after he entered junior high school. While book smart, he is extremely oblivious to the romantic interest the other girls develop for him over the course of the series.
Fumino Furuhashi (古橋 文乃, Furuhashi Fumino)
Voiced by: Haruka Shiraishi
A third-year student and a genius in the fields of humanities and social sciences. Fumino is fascinated with stars and wishes to pursue a degree in astronomy, despite her mediocre mathematics skills. Ironically, her father is a university mathematics professor. Fumino and her father have had a strained relationship ever since her mother's death ten years prior. However, with Nariyuki's support, they are finally able to reconcile. She often finds herself as the go-between for Nariyuki and the other girls regarding romance advice. She eventually falls for him herself, but tries to suppress her feelings for the sake of her friends. Fumino is inspired by the book The Lights in the Sky are Stars by Fredric Brown.
In her ending, Fumino is the one who falls on the way to the college entrance exam rather than Nariyuki. Using her broken leg as a means to grow closer to him, she and Nariyuki struggle to confess their mutual feelings for each other, but the two eventually do and become a couple.
Rizu Ogata (緒方 理珠, Ogata Rizu)
Voiced by: Miyu Tomita
A third-year student and a genius in the fields of mathematics and science. Rizu finds difficulty in understanding emotions, which inspired her decision to pursue a degree in psychology to overcome her own weakness. She is also passionate about board and card games, an interest fueled by gifts she had received from her late grandmother. She has never won a single game, blaming her endless losing streak on her inability to read people. Her family runs an udon shop, which she occasionally helps run.
In her ending, Rizu and Nariyuki help their friend Sawako Sekijou reconcile with her estranged parents, after which they become a couple.
Uruka Takemoto (武元 うるか, Takemoto Uruka)
Voiced by: Sayumi Suzushiro
A third-year student and a swimming prodigy. Uruka dreams of becoming an Olympic athlete and seeks to earn an athletic scholarship. However, due to her poor academics, she is placed under Nariyuki's tutelage to help improve her English skills and become a more well-rounded student. She has had a crush on Nariyuki since middle school, and befriended him after helping him cope with his father's death. Nevertheless, she continuously struggles to confess her feelings towards him. Later in the series, she receives a scholarship opportunity from an Australian university and becomes a famous swimmer.
In her ending, it is revealed that Uruka is the one who helped Nariyuki emotionally recover from the loss of his father. She confesses her feelings to Nariyuki before she leaves for Australia. Several years later she returns, now a world champion swimmer, and Nariyuki proposes to her, which she accepts.
Mafuyu Kirisu (桐須 真冬, Kirisu Mafuyu)
Voiced by: Lynn
A teacher at Ichinose Academy, and Rizu and Fumino's first tutor. Her opinions on education are very strong, and feels it is a waste of ability to not pursue a path that takes advantage of one's natural talents. She later had a change of heart after seeing Nariyuki help her students progress and apologizes to them for her selfishness. She was formerly an aspiring figure skater who retired from the sport after being inspired to pursue a career in teaching by Nariyuki's father. While Mafuyu comes off as cold and callous, she cares deeply about her students and wants them to succeed. Despite her professional demeanor while on the job, she is a complete slob at home.
In her ending, Nariyuki moves into the apartment next to Mafuyu's, and Nariyuki becomes her colleague after he starts teaching at Ichinose Academy. The arc ends with her realizing her feelings for Nariyuki and the two getting married.
Asumi Kominami (小美浪 あすみ, Kominami Asumi)
Voiced by: Madoka Asahina
An alumna of Ichinose Academy and a rōnin student. Asumi is often mistaken for a middle school student due to her petite stature. She aspires to attend the national medical university, despite her lackluster grades in science, in order to support her father's medical clinic. She first meets Nariyuki during cram school, and enjoys teasing him flirtatiously, much to his embarrassment. To pay for her cram school lessons and medical school entrance exam fee, she works at a maid café called High Stage.
In her ending, which takes place several years later, Asumi is doing her residency to become a doctor on a small, remote island. Nariyuki happens to land a job on the same island as a teacher and is also her next door neighbor. After a series of events, Nariyuki badly injures himself rescuing two of his students during a storm. Requiring surgery, Asumi is forced to operate on him to save his life. The incident solidifies her feelings for Nariyuki and after his full recovery, he proposes to her. After accepting his proposal, the two decide to one day start a family.

== Media ==
=== Manga ===
Written and illustrated by Taishi Tsutsui, We Never Learn started in Shueisha's shōnen manga magazine Weekly Shōnen Jump on February 6, 2017. The series "Ephemeral Mermaid Princess" arc finished in Weekly Shōnen Jump on March 9, 2020. It was followed by the series' last arc, the "Parallel Story" arc, featuring Nariyuki having endings with other characters in the series, which started in Weekly Shōnen Jump on March 16, 2020. The series finished on December 21, 2020. Shueisha has collected its chapters twenty-one into individual tankōbon volumes. The first volume was released on June 2, 2017, and the last on March 4, 2021.

Viz Media announced in April 2017 that they had licensed the manga for English release in North America, and serialized it digitally in their Weekly Shonen Jump magazine. On March 30, 2018, Viz Media announced the print release of the manga later that year. Shueisha began to simultaneously publish the series in English on the website and app Manga Plus in January 2019.

=== Light novel ===
A light novel titled Bokutachi wa Benkyō ga Dekinai hi Nichijō no Reidai-shū (ぼくたちは勉強ができない 非日常の例題集) written by Hamubane and illustrated by Tsutsui was published on April 4, 2019, by Shueisha under their Jump J-Books imprint. A second light novel titled Bokutachi wa Benkyō ga Dekinai: Mitaiken no Jikanwari with the same writer and artist was released on December 4, 2019.

=== Anime ===
An anime television series adaptation was announced in August 2018. The anime series was directed by Yoshiaki Iwasaki and written by Gō Zappa, featuring co-animation by Studio Silver and Arvo Animation and character designs by Masakatsu Sasaki. Masato Nakayama composed the music. The series aired from April 7 to June 30, 2019, on Tokyo MX, GTV, GYT, BS11, AT-X, MBS, and TV Aichi. (Note: Tokyo MX listed the series premiere at 24:30 on April 6, 2019, which is effectively April 7 at 12:30 a.m.) The opening theme is "Seishun Seminar" (セイシュンゼミナール) and the ending theme is "Never Give It Up!!", both performed by Haruka Shiraishi, Miyu Tomita, and Sayumi Suzushiro under the name Study. Aniplex of America licensed the series for distribution under the title We Never Learn: Bokuben, and streamed it on Crunchyroll, Hulu, and FunimationNow. In Australia and New Zealand, AnimeLab streamed the series in the region.

After the first season's finale aired, a second season was announced, which aired from October 6 to December 29, 2019. (Note: Tokyo MX listed the season premiere at 24:30 on October 5, 2019, which is effectively October 6 at 12:30 a.m.) The second opening theme is "Can now, Can now", performed by Study, while the ending theme is "Hōkago no Liberty" (放課後のリバティ), performed by Halca. The second season ran for 13 episodes. An OVA episode was bundled with the manga's fourteenth volume, which was released on November 1, 2019. Another OVA episode was bundled with the manga's sixteenth volume, which was released on April 3, 2020.

== Reception ==
In May 2018, the manga reached 1 million volumes in circulation. In February 2019, the circulation reached 2 million volumes, including digital sales. By March 2021, the total circulation of the series exceeded 4.4 million copies.

== See also ==
- Syd Craft: Love Is a Mystery, another manga series by the same author
