= Swindler (Akudama Drive) =

- Akudama Drive character
- Promotional illustration of Swindler
- First appearance: "Se7en" (2020)
- Created by: Kazutaka Kodaka, Tomohisa Taguchi
- Voiced by: Tomoyo Kurosawa (Japanese), Macy Anne Johnson (English)

In-universe information
- Alias: Ordinary Citizen

The Swindler (Japanese: 詐欺師, Hepburn: Sagi-shi), also known as Ordinary Person (一般人, Ippanjin), is the protagonist of the anime series Akudama Drive by Studio Pierrot and Too Kyo Games. A young woman working at the Kansai Seal Office who accidentally becomes a criminal when meeting the Akudama Courier. After saving what she thought was a black cat, the girl pretends to be a criminal named "Swindler" to avoid being killed by the other Akudama. As a result of this, Swindler is the target of justice and often escapes from the policemen known as Executioners. Eventually, Swindler embraces her transformation into an Akudama to bodyguard two children known as Brother and Sister who Executioners from Kansai wish to kidnap. The character has also appeared in the series' manga adaptation. She is voiced by Tomoyo Kurosawa in Japanese and Macy Anne Johnson in English.

In the making of the series, writer Kazutaka Kodaka had different plans for the character, envisioning as a mysterious character who would come across as an equal to the Akudama but stands out as well. However, after multiple discussions with director Tomohisa Taguchi, Swindler was rewritten to be as a more common character that might come across as the audience surrogate but still share her role as an assemble. The character was adapted by Cindy Yamauchi who aimed to give Swindler first an innocent design and later altered her into a more mature-like persona to symbolize her character arc.

Swindler was originally the subject of a mixed reception by anime and manga critics due to how she comically becomes a member of the main cast by accident, but still has no reason for staying with them, making her characterization appear forced and weak. However, Swindler's embracement of her criminal life was the subject of a more positive reception for becoming stronger as she wishes to protect two children regardless the cost. Kurosawa's voice acting as Swindler was also praised by the staff in charge of making the series.

== Creation ==
Swindler's redesign was inspired by Detroit: Become Human.

The character of Swindler was revised from Kazutaka Kodaka's original vision as he wanted to show a character who could not fit into the Akudamas but Tomohisa Taguchi revised her for his own take of a protagonist: "I first thought about the plot, I had prepared a lot of gimmicks for her, and she wasn't as straightforward of a character as she is in the final version. Amongst that, I wanted to include an ordinary person that would be mixed into the line-up of all the other Akudama. In that sense, I wanted to create a character that would be like a matchstick, or a character that fans could use as a reference point to see the abnormality of the other Akudama. I imagined a very ordinary character that would have different gimmicks later on." He expects to use this type of character again in other types of works. When he was thinking of Swindler, instead of having her stand under the spotlight, Kodaka wanted to make the viewers feel surprised. As a result, he wanted more mystery and suspense would be developed into her character.

As a result, Kodaka considers Swindler as a young girl who would surprise the audience. While Kodaka agreed that character designer Komatsuzaki does not care about his works sharing similarities, the team wanted each of them to stand out in the same fashion protagonists of Danganronpa stand out. Despite her innocence, with a societal punishment mindset, after Swindler's actions across the narrative, and threw society into chaos, Kodaka believes she might have gotten over potential to stay in prison for a century had she ever survived rather than been the subject of a public execution. According to Kodaka, the spotlight of the series is Swindler but it is not that everything goes from her point of view, and rather than the protagonist of the series, the cast of is an ensemble drama. Kodaka was surprised by the direction of Swindler's death scene due to the impact it delivers on the narrative when it comes to the series' main theme in regards to the what is justice and law as her death causes civilians and Executioners to question the law, resulting in the mayhem of Kansai.

The producer was concerned about the series promoting "evil" and came up with the idea of every character dying in a "cool" way similar to Reservoir Dogs. The day next after the series' finale, Taguchi noted that Swindler became a trend with Yamauchi praising her role in the series.

Rui Komatsuzaki created Swindler's design. When being asked about her similarities with Brother, Sister and Cutthroat, Kodaka claimed that while it is common to find visual similarities in designs within the cast, Komatsuzaki created the character to stand out alongside the other characters. Cindy Yamauchi adapted Komatsuzaki's work for the anime. The artist claims she found Swindler as the most difficult character to draw as she had to fit both the idea of being the protagonist and at the same time as innocent. Originally, Swindler was designed with the idea of looking beautiful and innocent, while a bag was added to her clothing which meant to hide from common items to weapons. Yamauchi revised Swindler and Sister's design for the series' second half, giving them a more adult feel based on the video game Detroit: Become Human.

=== Casting ===
Tomoyo Kurosawa voices the character in Japanese. When Taguchi heard Kurosawa's audition tape for Swindler, he thought she was fitting for the role. Kurosawa felt her character became more active in the narrative during the third episode as she becomes more prominent in most scenes. By the next episode, Kurosawa claimed that she felt the courage to finish the dialogue as she was inspired by the script. For the finale, Kurosawa stated she was glad with her work and wanted the audience to look forward to Swindler's role in the story.

Macy Anne Johnson voices the character in English. Since the protagonist of the series is not an actual Akudama, Johnson felt such role to be "super fun" as she had to act like a criminal.

== Appearances ==
Akudama Drive introduces the character as Ordinary Citizen, a young adult working for the city of Kansai. As criminals known as Akudama terrorize Kansai, an ordinary citizen gets dragged into danger when her good intentions steer her wrong after an encounter with Courier. The two meet Brawler, Doctor, Hacker, and Hoodlum. The ordinary citizen ends up helping Courier in destroying a tank drone. Together, they rescue Cutthroat from being executed who then places explosive collars on all of them. After this, it is revealed that a black cat Swindler rescued earlier is the mastermind behind bringing the Akudama together. Black Cat informs the Akudama that it has brought them together to attack the Shinkansen and steal a vault from its front carriage. The Execution Division Master and Pupil, members of a police force specialized to deal with the criminals. Once they finally reached the last carriage, Black Cat disintegrates into ash, leaving behind a special seal required to unlock the vault. After opening the vault, the Akudama find two children inside with the boy revealed to be the one controlling Black Cat and the orchestrator of the mission. The two children reveal themselves as the masterminds behind Black Cat and request the Akudama another mission: go back to Kansai, promising to double the amount of money they promised.

In the ensuing chaos, Brother forces Swindler and Sister aboard the rocket to protect them, leaving himself behind as the rocket launches. Swindler and Sister escape from the rocket after crash-landing and return to Kansai. Swindler is recognized as an Akudama and escapes with Sister. After arriving at a seemingly abandoned garbage plant, Swindler and Sister, thugs find the two and aim to violate them. Swindler is able to fight back with enough time to be saved by Courier. He later gives Sister a bag Brother wanted to return to her. When asked to fight alongside her to reunite the siblings, Courier allies with Swindler. When they head to the Executioners' headquarters, they are confronted by Cutthroat, who reveals that he has been waiting for the right opportunity to kill Swindler. Following a long chase, Swindler ultimately kills Cutthroat. Due to having a broken leg, Swindler requests Courier her last will of taking Brother and Sister to a safe area, returning the 500 yen as a price. Courier accepts and when taking the children, Swindler tries confusing the Executioners until she is killed. Courier is cornered by more Executioners, but people's protest against Swindler's murder allows him to escape with the children.

== Reception ==
Early critical response to Swindler has been mixed. In the series' premier, Anime Feminist was concerned about the apparent poor portrayal of female characters citing Swindler's weak persona. Otaku USA felt Swindler's inclusion within the Akudamas as a form of black comedy due to her innocence and how she is forced to deal with life-threatening situations as a result of only wanting to return Courier's lost money. On the other hand, Fandom Post felt her existence in the narrative to be strange as she is too normal despite being accidentally allied with the Akudama to the point she might be a "red herring". Although the writer criticized how Swindler has become attached to these types of situations and her trust to Courier despite both briefly interacting, something which the writer felt the narrative needed to the develop the cast, her bonding with Brother and Sister made her more appealing calling her the "voice of reason" of the group with Doctor's antagonism towards her making her more engaging as well as Cutthroat obsession with her. Anime News Network stated that the Akudama are" all on relatively equivalent footing—even the aggressively normal Swindler finds herself welcome in their absurdly powerful ranks". Richard Eisbens from Biggest In Japan found her intriguing due to how she interacts with the rest of the cast despite her codename giving her the idea of an ordinary person, leading to conspiracy whether or not there was something missing to reveal in the narrative especially based on the writing previously made by the series' staff.

Starting with the series' eighth episode, writers noticed a major change in Swindler's personality symbolized by her change of clothing and hairstyle as she has been forced to become an Akudama due to her adventures with the actual criminals. Fandom Post was impressed how she actually becomes a more violent person in the process due to how she kills two criminals who wanted she and Sister to be their sex slaves to protect her protegee, generating a major contrast with the character's original innocent persona. Both Anime News Network and Anime Feminist enjoyed not only the development but also redesign for not making her more sexually appealing but criticized her near rape scene which she found too dark. Her eventual confrontation with Cutthroat was also the subject of praise due to how Swindler has embraced her sins and murders one of the most dangerous characters in the series in a gruesome battle.

The character's death in the finale was also well received for the impact made as she interacts with the Executioners as she forces her own death so that Courier will transport Brother and Sister to a safe place while using her death scene as something the citizens of Kansai make each other wonder what is exactly a criminal resulting in mayhem in the entire city. Anime Feminist made an article focused on the major character arcs involving Swindler and Pupil as the two characters have moral issues with how citizens are treated in Kansai with the former becoming more active throughout her appearances. The character's death scene was praised for the delivery and often compared with Christian religion. Syfy.com found deep themes in Swindler's death scene which causes a cross shaped blood and the fact that the series aired in Christmas Eve implied more commentary. Meanwhile, Anime News Network found that the writers properly developed her character, pointing not only her death scene but also how the opening video of the anime and another scene from the finale show several changes in her appearance and facial expressions. Like Syfy, Anime News Network noted the similarities between Swindler and Jesus' deaths. Bubble Bubbler agreed in regards to the Christian notes involving Swindler's death and noted that despite being the most notable developed character in the series, she has had a major effect in Courier but subtle as in the finale, Courier carriers her legacy of protecting the children in powerful scenes before giving back the money Swindler gave her but to Brother and Sister in order to protect them from the enemies before his imminent death.

Renta made a popularity poll which ended with Swindler taking fourth place. The character is also collaboration illustration between Akudama Drive and the Danganronpa characters as both series involve the same artists. Tomoyo Kurosawa was praised by the staff members for her work as Swindler. Courier's voice actor, Yūichirō Umehara, enjoyed the work of Kurosawa-based how she portrays a different type of Akudama based on her innocence. Umehara in particular enjoyed the episode where Cutthroat tries to kill Swindler as he was able to record it with Kurosawa whose work left a major impression on him due to giving him the idea of a horror movie.
