= Akudama Drive =

Japanese anime television series

- Key visual

アクダマドライブ (Akudama Doraibu)
- Genre: Action; Cyberpunk
- Created by: Studio Pierrot; Too Kyo Games; Kazutaka Kodaka
- Manga
- Written by: Rokurō Ōgaki
- Published by: Papyless
- Magazine: Renta!
- Original run: July 7, 2020 – April 25, 2023
- Volumes: 9
- Anime television series
- Directed by: Tomohisa Taguchi
- Produced by: Yoshito Danno; Kazuaki Takahashi; Yoshihiko Tominaga; Akimichi Tsugawa
- Written by: Norimitsu Kaihō; Tomohisa Taguchi
- Music by: Aida Shigekazu; Maiko Iuchi
- Studio: Studio Pierrot
- Licensed by: Crunchyroll (Note: In North America through Crunchyroll, LLC (formerly known as Funimation).); SEA: Muse Communication
- Original network: BS NTV, SUN, Tokyo MX, KBS, AT-X
- Original run: October 8, 2020 – December 24, 2020
- Episodes: 12
- icon

Akudama Drive (Japanese: アクダマドライブ, Hepburn: Akudama Doraibu) is a 2020 Japanese cyberpunk anime television series conceptualized by Kazutaka Kodaka and produced by Pierrot and Too Kyo Games. It was written by Norimitsu Kaihō and directed by Tomohisa Taguchi. Set in a dystopian future in Kansai, the story follows a young woman who accidentally finds herself in a situation where she is forced to keep up the appearance of a Swindler to ensure she does not get killed by a group of Akudama, criminals who are pursued by the government. The series aired from October to December 2020. A total of six DVD and Blu-ray box sets collected the twelve-episode series in Japan.

Taguchi was inspired after seeing Kodaka's work in the Danganronpa series and both agreed to work together. Inspired by Quentin Tarantino's 1992 film Reservoir Dogs, Kodaka wrote the original draft of similar villains who acts as the protagonists. After showing his ideas to Too Kyo Games, the project was greenlit and Pierrot was brought in to create appealing action scenes. A manga adaptation has also been serialized, while a character CD soundtrack was released in Japan.

Critical response to the series was positive based on the cyberpunk setting as well as the handling of the main cast, most notably the lead Swindler. It is widely considered to be one of the best anime of 2020. Reviewers noted that the series primarily centered around the ideals of justice.

== Premise ==
In a dystopian future where Kansai became a vassal state of Kantō, multiple highly skilled criminals, called Akudama, are sent a message from an anonymous client to free a death row prisoner named Cutthroat before he is executed. Four Akudama respond to the challenge and descend into Kansai Police Headquarters to earn a big payday. However, once inside, they discover the job was part of a larger scheme by their client to make them work together on a bigger job: to infiltrate the Shinkansen and steal precious cargo from a vault at the front of the train. Roped into the job are an ordinary girl arrested on a minor charge but forced to keep up the appearance of a Swindler, and a low-level Hoodlum who was accidentally broken out of jail during the initial heist. The team must work together to finish the job and earn their large payday, all while keeping ahead of the Executioners from the Kansai Police on their tail.

== Characters ==
=== Akudama ===
Ordinary Person (一般人, Ippanjin) / Swindler (詐欺師, Sagi-shi)
Voiced by: Tomoyo Kurosawa (Japanese); Macy Anne Johnson (English)
A young woman working at the Kansai Seal Office who accidentally becomes a criminal when meeting Courier. After saving what she thought was a black cat, the girl pretends to be a criminal named "Swindler" to avoid being killed by the other Akudama.
Courier (運び屋, Hakobi-ya)
Voiced by: Yūichirō Umehara, Natsumi Fujiwara^{Ep. 11 credits} (young) (Japanese); Jonah Scott, Courtney Meeker (young) (English)
A terse man who is skilled at delivering any package to any recipient as long as he is paid. Courier can also fight with the use of his customized motorbike, which contains a small railgun built into the front.
Doctor (医者, Isha)
Voiced by: Megumi Ogata (Japanese); Brittany Lauda (English)
An attractive master surgeon, chemist, and all-around medical doctor who can heal herself almost instantly from injuries that would normally prove fatal.
Hoodlum (チンピラ, Chinpira)
Voiced by: Subaru Kimura (Japanese); Kellen Goff (English)
A chinpira who was serving a four year sentence in a Kansai prison when he was accidentally freed during the Cutthroat heist. Hoodlum becomes friends with Brawler.
Cutthroat (殺人鬼, Satsujinki)
Voiced by: Takahiro Sakurai (Japanese); Matt Shipman (English)
A mentally unstable person who was on Death Row for beheading 999 victims until he was freed by the other Akudama, making the police chief in charge of his execution the 1,000th beheading.
Hacker (ハッカー, Hakkā)
Voiced by: Shun Horie (Japanese); Y. Chang (English)
A master hacker who can infiltrate any system that is remotely accessible. He controls a pair of drones that can also act as weapons or turn into a makeshift hoverboard.
Brawler (喧嘩屋, Kenka-ya)
Voiced by: Shunsuke Takeuchi (Japanese); Zeno Robinson (English)
A brash and incredibly strong man who enjoys fighting and befriends Hoodlum.

=== Execution Division ===
Execution Division Pupil (処刑課弟子, Shokei-ka Deshi)
Voiced by: Yumiri Hanamori (Japanese); Jenny Yokobori (English)
As her namesake implies, the student of the Executioner Master who is incredibly skilled in close-quarters combat, including the use of an electric jutte.
Boss (ボス, Bosu)
Voiced by: Yoshiko Sakakibara (Japanese); Veronica Taylor (English)
An old woman who oversees the Executioners out of Kansai Police Headquarters.
Execution Division Master (処刑課師匠, Shokei-ka Shishō)
Voiced by: Akio Otsuka (Japanese); D. C. Douglas (English)
A ninja-like Executioner for the Kansai Police Department, trained to eliminate highly-dangerous Akudama.
Execution Division Junior (処刑課後輩, Shokei-ka Kōhai)
Voiced by: Taiko Katono (Japanese); Eddy Lee (English)
A novice Executioner who is assigned to work with Pupil.

=== Other characters ===
Black Cat (黒猫, Kuro Neko) / Brother (兄, Ani)
Voiced by: Maaya Uchida (Japanese); Daisy Guevara (English)
A robot taking the form of its namesake, Black Cat is a robotic animal controlled by a mysterious young boy who recruits the Akudama to break him and his sister out of a bank vault.
Sister (妹, Imōto)
Voiced by: Kana Ichinose (Japanese); Laura Stahl (English)
A mysterious young girl and the younger sister of Brother whom the Akudama encounter during the Shinkansen heist.
Bunny (ウサギ, Usagi)
Voiced by: Kurumi Mamiya (Japanese); Michael Kovach (English)
A bunny who serves as one of the mascots of Kansai.
Shark (サメ, Same)
Voiced by: Chō (Japanese); SungWon Cho (English)
A shark who serves as one of the mascots of Kansai.

== Production ==
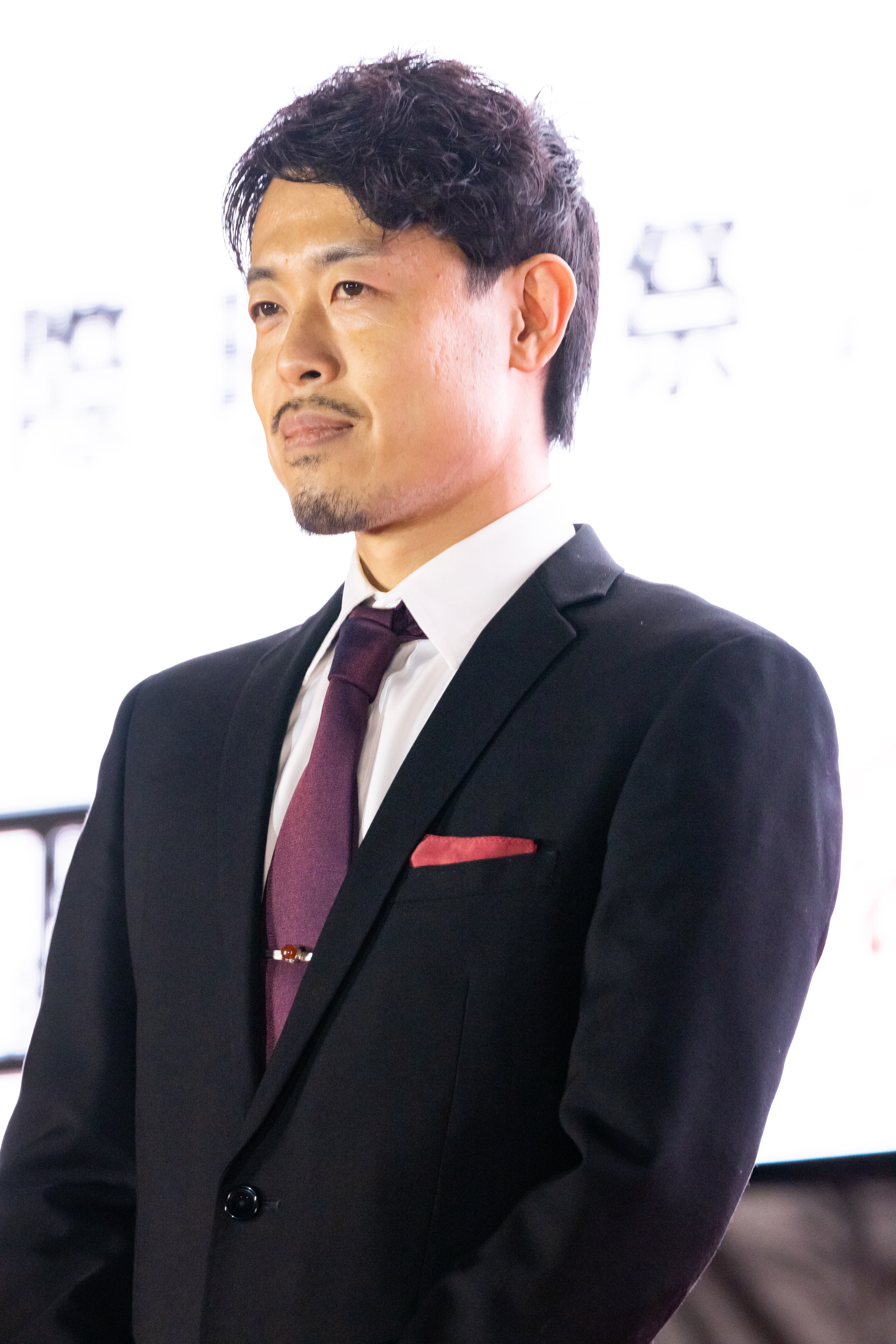
Director Tomohisa Taguchi (pictured) created Akudama Drive with Kazutaka Kodaka.

Akudama Drive was directed by Tomohisa Taguchi. This series originated with Taguchi's positive impression of Kazutaka Kodaka's work in Danganronpa franchise and both agreed to work together in this new project. Both were fans of the films Reservoir Dogs (1992), Pulp Fiction (1994), and The Usual Suspects (1995). This fascination with these films went into their desire to make a story set in a cyberpunk world with a Quentin Tarantino-inspired plot. Due to the cast being composed of seven protagonists, the team originally meant to call it Akudama Seven. The appeal of Reservoir Dogs led to the team to develop a unique cast with different features, all being referred by pseudonyms rather than personal names. Norimitsu Kaihō commented that the cast is meant to be rebellious in contrast to similar series where the cast relies on each other.

=== Setting and animation ===
The series had been planned ever since 2014. Kodaka recommended the anime to fans of the steampunk and crime genres. In an interview a few days prior to the series premiere, Kodaka stated that once it was decided the main cast would be villains, their roles, appearances, personalities, and names were chosen. He also stated that while he and Kaihō wrote the scripts, Taguchi was allowed to make the final decisions. Art director Yoshio Tanioka received aid from the directors of each episodes in regards to storyboards. The lighting was done by Saori Goda to generate a balance between the multiple colors while photography director Kazuhiro Yamada finished combining all their work. Tanioka denied a cyberpunk comparison and instead referenced "Japan, Kansai, and Showa". The Tsūtenkaku and Osaka Castle were carefully designed to give the setting the feeling the series was set in Osaka. Taguchi personally revised scenes of the series. For him, the biggest asset was having Tanioka as art director based on his idea that helped visualize the setting of Akudama Drive. Goda personally revised the colors presented through the animation. This also helped to create cells and shading.

Asahi Production did the series' animation. They were primarily in charge of creating monitors or holograms. On the other hand, there were many cases where the signboard was drawn by art, and the signboard on the screen of the first episode. In the Kansai city scene, signboards drawn with art and signboards of 2D works are mixed. The placement of the "2D Works sign" was done at the time of shooting, and the color and density of the monitor material were adjusted so that it blended in with the background. In addition, hologram processing was added to the signboards drawn by art. The setting were described by the art directors as a hybrid of everyday life and delusions. Telephone poles and quaint houses on the way to work were also added to the setting. The city of Kansai includes cutting-edge high-tech in order to make it nostalgic. The opening and ending video sequences were created to give multiple ideas to the viewers in regards to what the series is about while also showing appealing music. The characters were adapted by Cindy H. Yamauchi, who worked in order to make them stand out as individuals. Most of the series' voice acting was done in March 2020. In order to make the narrative more thrilling, during recording of the series, the Executioners were given more ruthless lines and interactions than the Akudama, even though the latter are criminals. Tomoyo Kurosawa was praised by the staff members for her work as Swindler.

=== Influences ===
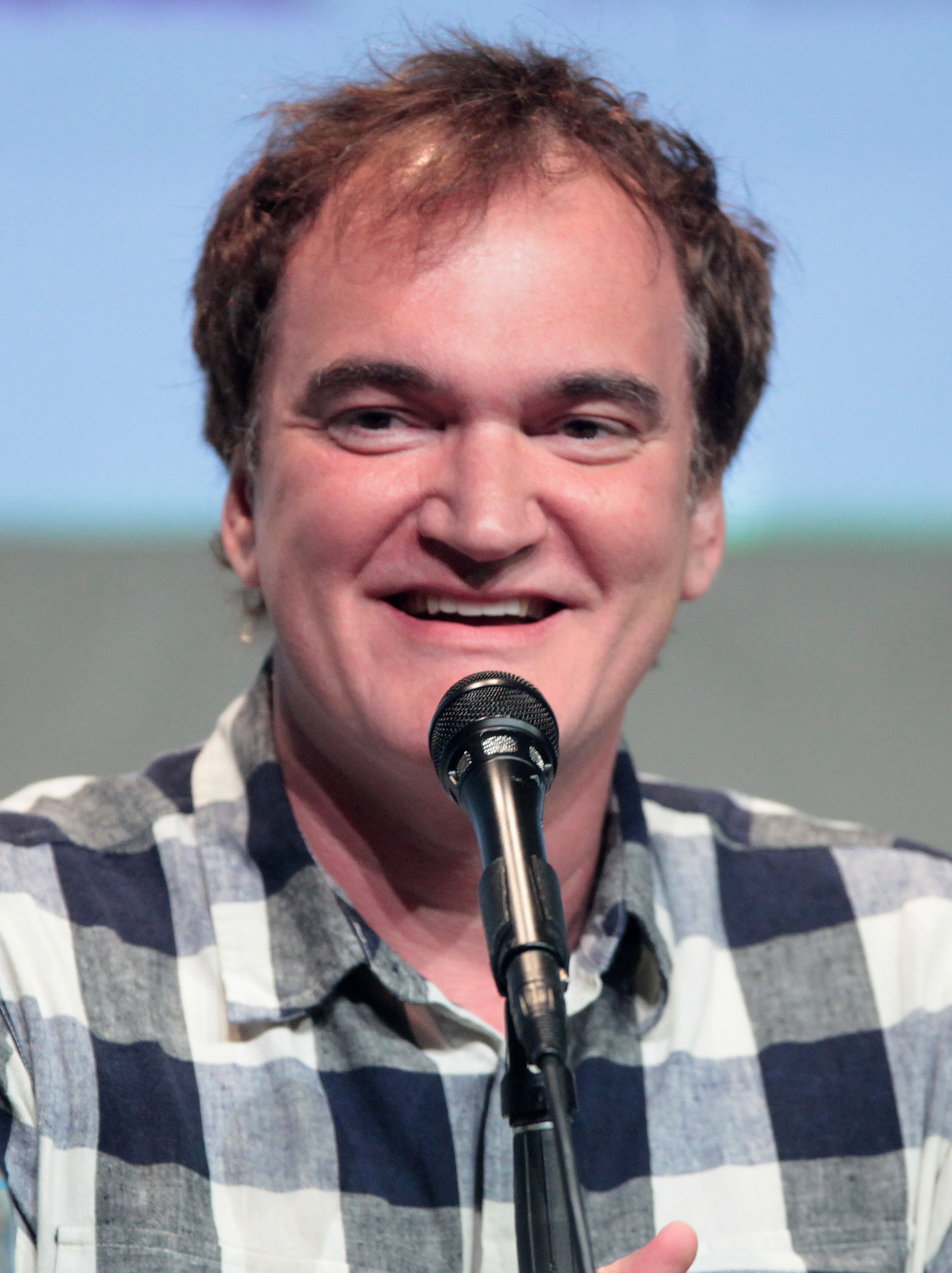
Quentin Tarantino was a major inspiration for the series, most notably through his film Reservoir Dogs.

Although the series is influenced by multiple works, the team wanted it to be a unique cyberpunk series based on the elements they wrote taken from Japanese culture. Other influences include Ridley Scott's Blade Runner (1980) and Mamoru Oshii's film Ghost in the Shell (1995). Taguchi wanted to entertain Western audience besides the Japanese which is why the anime takes place in Kansai, as Taguchi believed the Kansai city of Osaka felt more Japanese to overseas tourists than Tokyo. The artistic direction was hence based on the Osaka streetscape from the 1960s and 1970s. Once Taguchi and Kodaka agreed to work together, the latter showed Too Kyo Games his ideas for the series, which the studio greenlighted. Kodaka specifically chose the studio Pierrot to coanimate the series, believing its previous works were fitting for an action series.

The character of Swindler was revised from Kodaka's original vision as he wanted to show a character who could not fit into the Akudama, but Taguchi revised her for his own take of a protagonist. As a result, Kodaka considered Swindler as a young girl who would surprise the audience. While Kodaka agreed that character designer Komatsuzaki did not care about his works sharing similarities, the team wanted each of them to stand out in the same fashion protagonists of Danganronpa stood out. Yamauchi revised Swindler and Sister's design for the series' second half, giving them a more adult feel based on the video game Detroit: Become Human.

Subaru Kimura's portrayal of Hoodlum was noted to fit the director's original approach. Yūichirō Umehara was found as the fitting voice actor for Courier, with the staff finding that if he talked too much, he would be out of character. Umehara explained he found it a fitting yet challenging job due to Courier's silent personality via his lack of interactions. Umehara in particular enjoyed the work of Tomoyo Kurosawa (Swindler) and Takahiro Sakurai (Cutthroat) based on the appeal they gave to their characters, with the former for portraying a different type of Akudama based on her innocence and the latter for showing areas of dementia when talking as well as due to the fact they were more involved in interactions. He felt it was an entertaining work as a result of interacting with other famous voice actors like Akio Ōtsuka (Master) and Shunsuke Takeuchi (Brawler).

Megumi Ogata's voice acting was done to create a sexually appealing woman in contrast to her previous roles which included young males. The staff described Brawler as a bishōnen yet muscular character. Takeuchi's pitch was carefully done to fit the idea of Brawler. Originally a child, Hacker was transformed into a more mature person in the making of the series to fit the demographic. Shun Horie was told by the staff to give him a cold personality. The team found Cutthroat as the most difficult character to write. Brother was originally older than Sister, but Yamauchi altered them to make them look like twins while retaining their original clothes.

The Executioners' outfits were based on the Imperial Japanese Army and police officers. Master originally had a caring experience in the character table, but was altered due to his dark job. Yamauchi referred to the certain character in a certain special effects work while following the concept art for the hairstyle. The disciples had no major changes ever since their concept art. Only the hairstyle was altered due to the artist's preference. Boss was modeled after Judi Dench. The producer was concerned about the series promoting "evil" and came up with the idea of every character dying in a "cool" way similar to Reservoir Dogs. The finale was inspired by the 1994 film Léon: The Professional and the survival of Natalie Portman's character. Rather than having the dilemma of surviving, Kodaka agreed with the team that each character would die without regrets. Meanwhile, the surviving characters, Brother and Sister, were sent to the Shikoku region with the idea of giving the series an idea of hope. However, their fates were left ambiguous and Kodaka believed explaining it would require writing another series to focus on their journey.

=== Themes ===
Kodaka claims the series was specifically created to appeal to the overseas market. When it comes to writing, Kodaka took more priority when dealing with the beginning. As the Reservoir Dogs inspired characters are criminals, Kodaka wanted to give each a meaningful death based on his philosophies when writing characters: Kodaka claims that deaths help to properly fulfil the cast. Due to the fact that the Akudama were criminals, Kodaka envisioned them as individuals that had to die in the series. Early sketches of the series involved more brutal scenes, but Kodaka decided to use a "pop" aesthetic for the narrative. As Swindler goes from an accidental criminal, the narrative explores her acceptance of any dark actions she has to commit for her job which involves her decision to protect Brother and Sister even if she has to kill people.

According to Kodaka, the series' main theme regarding the Executioners and their character arcs involve their concept of crime and justice, which is touched upon with Swindler's death. Taguchi claims the director's cut scene further improves the narrative as it explores more of the chaotic city which Courier was trying to escape from to protect the children. Taguchi and Umehara stated that across the finale, the Executioners were developed, most notably through Pupil. However, the staff claimed there is no message and is instead meant to be ambiguous. Swindler's history was compared with Jesus due to how her fate is controversial it is found to the standers.

== Media ==
=== Manga ===
A manga adaptation by Rokurō Ōgaki debuted on Papyless's Renta! service with its first two chapters on July 7, 2020, and ended on April 25, 2023. The series was collected into nine digital volumes, published from January 28, 2022, to May 27, 2023.

Renta! began releasing the English version of the manga digitally on October 9, 2020.

=== Anime ===
Norimitsu Kaihō and Taguchi oversaw the series scripts. Cindy H. Yamauchi adapted Rui Komatsuzaki's original character designs for animation. Aida Shigekazu composed the music. The opening theme is "STEAL!!" by SPARK!!SOUND!!SHOW!!, while the ending theme is "Ready" by Urashimasakatasen. A collection of image songs was released on December 23, 2020.

The anime was delayed from July 2020 to October 2020 due to the COVID-19 pandemic. The series aired from October 8 to December 24, 2020. Funimation licensed the series outside of Asia and streamed it on its website in North America and the British Isles, in Europe through Wakanim, and in Australia and New Zealand through AnimeLab. On December 2, 2020, Funimation announced that the series would receive an English dub. Following Sony's acquisition of Crunchyroll, the series was moved to Crunchyroll. Muse Communication has licensed the series in Southeast Asia.

==== Episodes ====
No.	Title (Note: Each episode, aside from Episode 12, is named after a film title.)	Directed by	Written by	Original release date
1	"Se7en" (Note: Stylized as SE7EN)	Tomohisa Taguchi	Norimitsu Kaihō, Tomohisa Taguchi	October 8, 2020
As criminals known as Akudama terrorize Kansai, an Ordinary Person gets dragged into danger when her good intentions steer her wrong after an encounter with Courier. At the Kansai Police Station, the Ordinary Person, who is forced to use the alias "Swindler", ends up helping Brawler, Doctor, Hacker, Courier, and Hoodlum rescue Cutthroat from being executed. He then places explosive collars on all of them. Afterwards, it is revealed that a black cat Swindler rescued earlier is the mastermind behind bringing the Akudama together.
2	"Reservoir Dogs" (Note: Stylized as RESERVOIR DOGS)	Yoshifumi Sasahara	Norimitsu Kaihō, Yoshifumi Sasahara, Tomohisa Taguchi	October 15, 2020
Black Cat informs the Akudama that it has brought them together to attack the Shinkansen and steal a vault from its front carriage. While discussing the details, the group is attacked by Execution Division Master and Pupil, members of a police force specialized to deal with Akudama. The group narrowly escapes the assault.
3	"Mission: Impossible" (Note: Stylized as MISSION:IMPOSSIBLE)	Hikaru Murata	Ryō Morise, Yoshifumi Sasahara, Tomohisa Taguchi	October 22, 2020
The Akudama rendezvous at an abandoned warehouse where they go over the finer details of the Shinkansen heist. They put their plan into motion and barely manage to make it to the loading dock in time, but a premature power cut forces Swindler to enter the train instead of Hacker, and the emergency reset it triggers sets the Shinkansen in motion earlier than anticipated, with the group still on board.
4	"Speed" (Note: Stylized as SPEED)	Yoshinori Odaka	Norimitsu Kaihō, Tomohisa Taguchi	October 29, 2020
On their way to complete their mission, the Akudama are attacked by the two Executioners again. Courier and Brawler face them but are overpowered. Doctor, Cutthroat, and Hoodlum assist them while Swindler and Hacker alongside Black Cat follow their objective. Once they finally reached the last carriage, Black Cat disintegrates into ash, leaving behind a special seal required to unlock the vault. After opening the vault, the Akudama find two children inside, with the boy revealed to be the one controlling Black Cat and the orchestrator of the mission.
5	"Dead Man Walking" (Note: Stylized as DEAD MAN WALKING)	Takumi Dōyama	Norimitsu Kaihō, Ryō Morise, Yoshifumi Sasahara, Tomohisa Taguchi	November 5, 2020
The two children, Brother and Sister, reveal themselves as the masterminds behind Black Cat and request the Akudama another mission: go back to Kansai, promising to double the amount of money they promised. While Hacker decides to leave the group after he removes the explosive collar from his neck, the rest of the Akudama decide to finish the mission. Meanwhile, Master decides to continue his job despite his wounds.
6	"Brother" (Note: Stylized as BROTHER)	Yoshifumi Sasahara	Yoshifumi Sasahara, Tomohisa Taguchi	November 12, 2020
When Master catches up with the Akudama, Brawler fights him willingly, while the others are forced to do so as they try to make their escape. During the battle, Cutthroat uses Brother as a shield in order to stab Master. It is later revealed that Brother has a healing factor. After the battle between Brawler and Master, which leaves both of them dead, Hoodlum encounters Pupil and attacks her.
7	"The City of Lost Children"; Transliteration: "Rosuto・Chirudoren" (Japanese: ロスト・チルドレン)	Hikaru Murata	Hikaru Murata, Tomohisa Taguchi	November 19, 2020
After Brawler's death, Hoodlum returns to the Akudama who learn of Brother and Sister's origins. They are the only survivors of a group of test subjects who want escape to the Moon. With their job completed, Brother and Sister grant the Akudama their money, but Doctor betrays them and reveals their location to the Executioners. Boss then reveals to Brother and Sister that the Moon was also destroyed during the war and thus they have nowhere to escape. In the ensuing chaos, Brother forces Swindler and Sister aboard the rocket to protect them, leaving himself behind as the rocket launches.
8	"Black Rain" (Note: Stylized as BLACK RAIN)	Yūta Suzuki, Tomohisa Taguchi, Yoshifumi Sasahara	Tomohisa Taguchi	November 26, 2020
Swindler and Sister escape from the rocket after it crash-lands and returns to Kansai. However, while attempting to buy a meal, Swindler is recognized as an Akudama and escapes with Sister. Meanwhile, Doctor and Hoodlum search for Brother and Pupil is revealed to be alive, now wearing an eyepatch, and assigned to a new partner by Boss. After arriving at a seemingly abandoned garbage plant, Swindler and Sister indulge in the food stored inside and clean themselves up with Swindler cutting her hair short. Shortly thereafter, thugs find the two and aim to violate them. Swindler is able to fight back, which gives them enough time to be saved by Courier. He later gives Sister a bag Brother wanted to return to her. When asked to fight alongside her to reunite the siblings, Courier allies with Swindler. Elsewhere, Cutthroat finds the rocket's crash site and promises to find Swindler.
9	"The Shining" (Note: Stylized as THE SHINING)	Tomohisa Taguchi	Tomohisa Taguchi	December 3, 2020
Courier and Swindler devise a plan to reach Brother. When they head to the Executioners' headquarters, they are confronted by Cutthroat, who reveals that he has been waiting for the right opportunity to kill Swindler. Following a long chase, Swindler ultimately kills Cutthroat. Later, the Executioners escape with Brother just as Courier, Swindler, and Sister reach the roof.
10	"Babel" (Note: Stylized as BABEL)	Hikaru Murata	Tomohisa Taguchi	December 10, 2020
Courier, Swindler, Sister, Hoodlum, and Doctor all follow the Executioners to the Kansai Station. Meanwhile, in order to quell the riots, Boss has the Chief of Police declare the insurgents Akudama. At the station, just as Brother is about to be shipped inside the Shinkansen, everyone arrives with Doctor putting a needle through Junior's heart while Hoodlum holds a scalpel to Swindler's throat. When Swindler gets through to Hoodlum, Doctor reveals that she manipulated him after she orchestrated Brawler's death. While she is distracted by a crowd entering the station, Hoodlum slits Doctor's throat. However, he dies when she slits his throat as well. Doctor is then trampled to death by the crowd. Afterwards, Brother, Courier, Swindler, and Sister goes inside the Shinkansen, while Pupil stays behind with Junior.
11	"War Games" (Note: Stylized as WAR GAMES)	Yoshifumi Sasahara	Tomohisa Taguchi	December 17, 2020
Swindler and Courier are trapped in their past memories in a digital world until they are both saved by Hacker. Hacker explains Kanto has been using Brother and Sister to continue existing. Hacker sacrifices himself to save the children who reunite with Swindler. After Hacker passes to the afterlife, Swindler and Courier discuss their next move. However, they are attacked while they are inside the Shinkansen.
12	"Akudama Drive" (Note: Stylized as AKUDAMA DRIVE); Transliteration: "Akudama Doraibu" (Japanese: アクダマドライブ)	Tomohisa Taguchi	Tomohisa Taguchi	December 24, 2020
Due to having a broken leg, Swindler requests Courier take Brother and Sister to a safe area, returning the 500 yen as payment. After they leave, Swindler tries to confuse the Executioners until she is killed. Courier is later cornered by more Executioners, but people's protest against Swindler's murder, which she recorded, allows him to escape with the children. Following multiple battles, Courier tells the children to leave him and move to their destiny with Swindler's 500 yen as he has suffered major wounds in his chest. Once he finally takes out the remaining drones, Courier dies peacefully while Brother and Sister reach their destiny.

=== Home media release ===
Japanese

Name	Date	Discs	Episodes
Volume 1	December 25, 2020	1	1–2
Volume 2	January 29, 2021	1	3–4
Volume 3	February 26, 2021	1	5–6
Volume 4	March 26, 2021	1	7–8
Volume 5	April 28, 2021	1	9–10
Volume 6	May 28, 2021	1	11–12

English

Name	Date	Discs	Episodes
The Complete Season	November 30, 2021	2	12

=== Stage play ===
A stage play adaptation was announced in December 2021. It ran at the Stellar Ball in Tokyo from March 10 to March 21, 2022, and at the Cool Japan Park Osaka WW Hall in Osaka on March 26 and March 27 of the same year. Tomoyo Kurosawa reprised her role as Ordinary Person/Swindler.

== Reception ==
Akudama Drive was approached by critics from manga and anime before its release. Lauren Orsini from Anime News Network and D. M. Moore from Polygon regarded Akudama Drive as their most anticipated series from Fall 2020. On its premiere, the series attracted multiple positive reactions from fans and reviews, citing similarities between Kodaka's Danganronpa series and the 1982 film Blade Runner. One reviewer was more skeptical of the premiere, calling the series "edgy". The Fandom Post gave the first episode a "B", finding the large cast fun but at the same time hilarious when they are introduced. The following episode earned an "A" with praise focused on the cast's interaction and fight scenes. Although Anime Feminist was concerned about the apparent poor portrayal of female characters citing Doctor's skimpy appearance and Swindler's weak persona, Richard Eisbens from Biggest In Japan found the latter intriguing due to how she interacts with the rest of the cast despite her codename giving her the idea of an ordinary person, leading to conspiracy whether or not there was something missing to reveal in the narrative especially based on the writing previously made by the series' staff. Based on the premise and cast, Syfy.com considered the series as a Suicide Squad-like story with elements of cyberpunk but in the form of a chaotic utopia as a result of how society is viewed. Comic Book Resources noted that despite the simplistic personalities the protagonists have, they are still unpredictable to describe as a result of how violent they are due to their nature as Akudama, whom the writer compared to Quentin Tarantino's protagonists from the movie Reservoir Dogs.

Starting with the series' eighth episode, writers noticed a major change in Swindler's personality symbolized by her change of clothing and hairstyle as she has been forced to become an Akudama due to her adventures with the actual criminals. The Fandom Post was impressed how she actually becomes a more violent person in the process due to how she kills two criminals. Both Anime News Network and Anime Feminist enjoyed not only the development but also redesign for not making her more sexually appealing, but criticized her near rape scene, which she found too dark. Her eventual confrontation with Cutthroat was also the subject of praise due to how Swindler has embraced her sins and murders one of the most dangerous characters in the series in a gruesome battle.

The series finale was acclaimed by Anime News Network and The Fandom Post for the focus given on Swindler's actions to generate chaos in the society to the point the law is attacked as well as Courier's last job he was given by his ally to protect both Brother and Sister. Syfy.com noted that the finale involved heavy themes that were not subtle such as commentary about the law through the handling of the criminals. The writers also found deeper themes in Swindler's death scene which causes a cross shaped blood and the fact that the series aired in Christmas Eve implied more commentary. Anime Feminist made an article focused on the major character arcs involving Swindler and Pupil as the two characters have moral issues with how citizens are treated in Kansai with the former becoming more active throughout her appearances as she becomes a heroic figure to save Brother and Sister accepting the title of Akudama in the process.

In a general review, Otaku USA praised the animation as it "is always spectacular and action choreography/camerawork always hyper-kinetic" but suggested its fans rely on home video to see the uncensored violent scenes which occur multiple times as he was surprised by the large number of deaths in the series. Syfy.com also commented on the animation, but found the violence to be too impactful for sensitive viewers. Comic Book Resources regarded the animation in regards to the setting as one of the reasons why the anime became popular, referring to Kansai as "distinctively cyberpunk" as well as the dark elements provided subsequently.

Multiple writers from Anime News Network listed Akudama Drive as one of their favorite series from 2020, while readers from the same site also voted it as the 9th best anime of the year. Funimation and UK Anime News listed it as one of the best anime of 2020, with the latter commenting on to its usage of characters and setting to the point of calling it one of the best sci-fi anime alongside Id – Invaded. Anime Feminist listed it as a runner up involving the best 2020 anime series regarding it as "transgressive and subversive" for making a likable cast despite their professions and developing Swindler while at the same time criticizing the near rape scene and the apparent racist portrayal of Brawler. In the 2021 Anime Trending's "Anime of the Year Awards", the series won the categories of "Best Anime", "Best Original Screenplay", as well as "Best Sci-Fi and Best Mystery". Courier was also nominated for "Boy of the Year" in December 2020. Renta! made a popularity poll, which ended with Cutthroat's victory.

The anime's entry in The Encyclopedia of Science Fiction notes that the series is "a violent, colourful, action-packed Cyberpunk Dystopia [...] thoughtful and [...] ultimately downbeat", concluding that while "the serious undercurrent clashes a little with the implausibility of some of the high jinks [...] this is a very good Anime that engages with police brutality, Sociology, Politics and Jonbar Points".
