= Courier (Akudama Drive) =

Akudama Drive character

- Akudama Drive character
- Promotional illustration for the character Courier by Cindy Yamauchi.
- First appearance: "Se7en" (2020)
- Created by: Kazutaka Kodaka; Tomohisa Taguchi
- Voiced by: Yūichirō Umehara, Natsumi Fujiwara (young) (Japanese); Jonah Scott, Courtney Meeker (young) (English)

In-universe information
- Occupation: Courier

The Courier (Japanese: 運び屋, Hepburn: Hakobi-ya) is a protagonist in the anime series Akudama Drive by Studio Pierrot and Too Kyo Games. He is a terse man who is skilled at delivering any package to any recipient as long as he is paid. Courier can also fight with his customized motorbike, which contains a small railgun built into the front. Courier is introduced in the first episodes, where he accidentally drags the Ordinary Citizen, who becomes the Akudama Swindler, into teaming up with other criminals and go on missions to protect people wanted by the law. He is voiced by Yūichirō Umehara.

The character of Courier was created by Kazutaka Kodaka and inspired by the cast of the Quentin Tarantino film Reservoir Dogs. His design was changed throughout the creation of the series, as its concept wavered between steampunk and cyberpunk, which also involved changes to the bike the character drives. Rui Komatsuzaki designed the character while Cindy Yamauchi adapted the visuals for the animation. Both of Courier's designers were pleased with the visual appearance of the original design.

Critical response to Courier was often mixed, with positive comments focused on his action scenes and role in the series, and negative comments focused on the simplistic and silent personality. Nevertheless, multiple writers noted that Courier often showed a more charming self when interacting with Swindler as he aids her in her journey without caring about the money he needs for her jobs. His character has also been popular in polls.

== Creation ==
Courier driving his advanced bike which differed in the original drafts as it was aimed to look like a steampunk setting in contrast to the finished cyberpunk setting.

Writer Kazutaka Kodaka created Courier as he oversaw the writing of Akudama Drive. The character was first revealed in March 2020, but made his debut in a manga adaptation made to promote the delayed anime. Originally, Kodaka did not give the characters names while writing the script of Akudama Drive. As the work progressed, Kodaka decided to give Courier and the rest of the members such aliases instead of names, inspired by the film Reservoir Dogs. In the series' beginning, Courier drops 500 yen in the street accidentally but decides not to pick it up, considering it bad luck. This scene was specifically written by Kodaka due to his views on collecting money, which he finds a "chore". Kodaka created Courier as a protagonist in a certain sense who takes the most prominent action in the series but would remain silent in the subsequent scenes. Director Tomohisa Taguchi agreed, claiming that Courier has a strong presence in the narrative even though there is no intonation, something he found important to properly portray him.

Kodaka has claimed that both Courier and Cutthroat are his two favorite characters from the anime, having enjoyed the original concept art by Rui Komatsuzaki. The design was adapted by Cindy Yamauchi who found it challenging despite its apparent simplicity. In regards to his bike, Yamauchi claims that it did not receive a title. Yamauchi felt pressure when Akudama Drive appeared in the Otomedia magazine based on Courier's clothing that she felt made him look attractive. Yamauchi also drew a young Courier into the making of the series as she aimed to such work into the anime. Initially, the carrier's bike was also sent to steampunk, but with the addition of the setting made by Kanto, it returned to cyberpunk. The director found appealing the usage of security robots and combat helicopters which Courier often battles. In the first episode, Courier does a tribute to the 1988 film Akira through the way he moves his bike like Shotaro Kaneda. Manga artist Rokurou Ogaki found the character appealing especially in the finale despite his poor manners, and looked forward to generate the same appeal in the manga version of the series.

The producer was concerned about the series promoting "evil" and came up with the idea of every character dying in a "cool" way similar to Reservoir Dogs. For the finale, Pierrot added a new scene where Courier interacts more with Brother and Sister during the mayhem Kansai suffers as a form of director's cut which the television series lacked. The finale was inspired by the 1994 film Léon: The Professional and the survival of Natalie Portman's character. Rather than having the dilemma of surviving, Kodaka agreed with the team that each character would die without regrets. The surviving characters, Brother and Sister, were sent to the Shikoku region after Courier and Swindler die protecting them, like Jean Reno's title character Leon.

=== Casting ===
Yūichirō Umehara was found the fitting voice actor for Courier with the staff finding that if he talked too much, he would be out of character. When he looked at the materials, he said that every Akudama was interesting and wondered how to bring out the character of the Courier even though he is the least active Akudama. Since the cast did not know the future episodes when recording, Umehara looked forward to seeing Courier's role in the story.

Umehara explained he found it a fitting yet challenging job due to Courier's silent personality and lack of interactions. Umehara in particular enjoyed the work of Tomoyo Kurosawa (Swindler) and Takahiro Sakurai (Cutthroat) based on the appeal they give to their characters, with the former for portraying a different type of Akudama based on her innocence and the latter for portraying his character's dementia in his speech. He felt it was entertaining to interact with famous voice actors like Akio Ōtsuka (Master) and Shunsuke Takeuchi (Brawler). Umehara looked forward to the series' finale and make viewers explore the themes of the series involving justice and evil.

Jonah Scott voices Courier in the English dub of the series, while Courtney Meeker provides the voice of his younger self. Scott noted that the character was "cool" based on his design and weaponry. Scott also joked about Courier's personality for his tendency of calling Swindler "shithead" and recommended Akudama Drive to people who have enjoyed the Danganronpa franchise due to sharing the same writer.

== Appearances ==
Courier is introduced as a criminal labeled as "Akudama" known for his skills as a gunner and biker. In Kansai, he visits a store to eat takoyaki, but accidentally drops money, which an ordinary citizen tries to return to him. Unwilling to take it due to his belief in bad luck, Courier accidentally drags the young woman into his Akudama affairs. The two meet Brawler, Doctor, Hacker, and Hoodlum. The ordinary citizen ends up helping Courier in destroying a tank drone as the new forced Akudama help at finding the imprisoned Cutthroat. As Cutthroat is saved, he places explosive collars on all of his allies. After this, it is revealed that a black cat Swindler rescued earlier is the mastermind who brought the Akudama together. Black Cat informs the Akudama that it has gathered them to attack the Shinkansen and steal a vault from its front carriage. The Execution Division Master and Pupil, members of a police force specialized to deal with the Akudama. Once they reach the last carriage, Black Cat disintegrates into ash, leaving behind a seal required to unlock the vault. After opening the vault, the Akudama find two children inside, with the boy revealed as the one controlling Black Cat and the orchestrator of the mission. The two children give the Akudama another mission: go back to Kansai, promising to double the amount of money they promised.

In the ensuing chaos, Brother hires Courier to return to Kansai and give him an item to partner, codenamed Sister, protecting her in the process. Courier arrives at a seemingly abandoned garbage plant and saves both Swindler and Sister from thugs who wanted to violate them. Swindler then hires Courier again to reunite Sister with Brother even though she does not have much money. Courier accepts nevertheless. When they head to the Executioners' headquarters, the AIs try trapping Courier and Swindler in the area, making the former relive his past life when he used to work alongside an unknown partner who got killed by criminals. After being saved by Hacker, Swindler requests for Courier to take Brother and Sister to a safe area, returning the 500 yen as payment. Courier accepts, and Swindler tries holds up the Executioners until she is killed. Courier is cornered by more Executioners, but protests against Swindler's murder allow him to escape with the children. After being seriously wounded, Courier gives Brother and Sister the money from the late Swindler as a good luck memento to protect them as he uses his last forces to destroy the droids hunting them. Courier is last seen dying on his bike, smiling.

== Reception ==
=== Critical response ===
Ever since his introduction, Courier was noted for his skills at driving his bike in over-the-top ways, though two writers from Anime News Network disagreed on whether such abilities were appealing or not. The Fandom Post was more positive to his introduction, noting how he introduces the viewers to the cyberpunk setting. Otaku USA described him as "your traditional taciturn "all business" cyberpunk hero". While praising Courier's fight scenes against the Executioners, Comic Book Resources criticized his silent personality alongside Doctor's.

Critics also commented around the bond Courier develops alongside Swindler. The Fandom Post criticized the handling of Courier and Swindler's relationship due to their lack of interactions despite the former triggering the latter's branding as an Akudama accidentally. Despite retaining his stoic self, Anime News Network enjoyed the dynamic Courier develops with Swindler, Brother and Sister as he comes across as more human similar to how Spike Chunsoft handled the characters from the Danganronpa franchise through their character arcs. In regards to the handling of Courier's personality, Anime News Network regarded him as a tsundere character for how he keeps his distant personality despite his continuous assistance towards Swindler. The Fandom Post was confused about Courier's backstory being explored, unlike with the rest of the Akudama.

For the series finale, The Fandom Post acclaimed Courier's action scenes. Bubble Bubbler noted that despite Swindler being the most notable developed character in the series, she has had a major effect in Courier, as in the finale, Courier carriers her legacy of protecting the children, culminating in giving the money Swindler picked up for him to Brother and Sister before his imminent death. Anime News Network claimed that Courier did "some of the coolest shit in the show to date", specifically bringing up how he uses his prosthetic arm to fire his bike's railgun.

=== Popularity ===
Courier is a popular character within the series fandom. Renta made a popularity poll in which Courier took second place behind Cutthroat. The character is also part of collaboration illustration between Akudama Drive and the Danganronpa characters as both series involve the same artists. Courier was also nominated to "Best Boy" in December 2020 by Anime Trendz. In commemoration of the series' first anniversary, the TV series carried out a Twitter campaign where Yuichiro Umehara autographed an image of Courier by Yamauchi. In AnimeAnime 2021 survey, Umehara's performance as Courier was praised by fans, ranking as the 8th best character voiced by him. When Akudama Drive won the best anime award of 2020 in Anime Trendz the character's image was used alongside Swindler, Brother and Sister to receive the award.
