= Hortensia Saga =

2015 video game

オルタンシア・サーガ (Orutanshia Sāga)
- Video game

Hortensia Saga: Ao no Kishidan
- Developer: f4Samurai; Sega
- Genre: Role-playing
- Platform: Android, iOS
- Released: JP: April 22, 2015
- Manga
- Illustrated by: Pon Jea; Seiji
- Published by: Media Factory
- Magazine: Monthly Comic Alive
- Original run: March 27, 2020 – November 27, 2020
- Volumes: 2
- Anime television series
- Directed by: Yasuto Nishikata
- Written by: Rintarō Ikeda
- Music by: Zenta
- Studio: Liden Films
- Licensed by: Crunchyroll (Note: In North America through Crunchyroll, LLC (formerly known as Funimation).): SEA: Muse Communication
- Original network: Tokyo MX, BS11, GTV, GYT, CBC, YTV, AT-X
- English network: US: Crunchyroll Channel
- Original run: January 7, 2021 – March 25, 2021
- Episodes: 12
- icon

Hortensia Saga: Ao no Kishidan (Japanese: オルタンシア・サーガ -蒼の騎士団-, Hepburn: Orutanshia Sāga: Ao no Kishidan; lit. "Hortensia Saga: Blue Knights") was a Japanese free-to-play role-playing video game developed and published by f4Samurai and Sega. It was released in Japan in April 2015 for Android and iOS devices. The game ended service in May 2022. An anime television series adaptation produced by Liden Films aired from January to March 2021.

== Plot ==
The Kingdom of Hortensia has been protected by its two vassal states, Olivier and Camellia, for centuries. One day, however, Camellia decides to rebel against its allies. The situation gets worse upon the arrival of monsters. Hortensia is forced to fight in order to stop the rebellion and restore peace to the land.

== Characters ==
Alfred Albert (アルフレッド・オーベル, Arufureddo Ōberu)
Voiced by: Yoshimasa Hosoya (Japanese); Chris Hackney (English)
The protagonist is the main player-controlled character of Hortensia Saga. He is named Alfred Albert in the anime series.
Marius Casterede (マリユス・カステレード, Mariyusu Kasuterēdo)
Voiced by: Yui Horie (Japanese); Laura Stahl (English)
A young boy who was rescued by Maurice after the rebellion that took his parents' lives. He has trained for years alongside Alfred and becomes his squire. Secretly, Marius is Princess Mariel D'Hortensia (マリエル・ド・オルタンシア, Marieru do Orutanshia), hiding under Maurice to keep her out of the sights of Camellia.
Maurice Baudelaire (モーリス・ボードレール, Mōrisu Bōdorēru)
Voiced by: Kenjiro Tsuda (Japanese); D. C. Douglas (English)
A Knight Templar of Hortensia who lost his right eye during the rebellion, but managed to escape the capital with Fernando's sword and a boy named Marius. He spends a few years training both Alfred and Marius to defend themselves.
Nonnoria Foly (ノンノリア・フォリー, Nonnoria Forī)
Voiced by: Reina Ueda (Japanese); Kayli Mills (English)
A maid serving the Albert household.
Qoo Morimoru (クー・モリモル, Kū Morimoru)
Voiced by: Aya Uchida (Japanese); Suzie Yeung (English)
A small winged talking mammal who ends all his sentences with "moru."
Deflotte Danois (デフロット・ダノワ, Defurotto Danowa)
Voiced by: Yuichiro Umehara (Japanese); Alejandro Saab (English)
A womanizing spearman with a small bounty on his head who fled his village at an early age, only to find it overrun by zombies when he returned years later. He joins Alfred's party after they help save what is left of his home from the Church.
Adelheid Olivier (アーデルハイド・オリヴィエ, Āderuhaido Orivie)
Voiced by: Yū Kobayashi (Japanese); Rebekah Thomas (English)
A Knight Templar of Hortensia who wields a spear in combat. The heir to the Olivier Dominion after her father died, she is forced to run a vassal state under the eyes of the Church, but secretly continues searching for the missing Princess Mariel.
Leon D. Olivier (レオン・D・オリヴィエ, Reon D Orivie)
Voiced by: Tetsuya Kakihara
The leader of the Olivier Dominion and Adelheid's father who died while protecting the King of Hortensia during Camellia's rebellion.
Fernando Albert (フェルナンド・オーベル, Ferunando Ōberu)
Voiced by: Takehito Koyasu
A Knight Templar of Hortensia who gave his life to drive out Duke Rugis from the castle during the rebellion. His sword was passed down to his son, Alfred.
Rugis F. Camellia (ルギス・F・カメリア, Rugisu F Kameria)
Voiced by: Kenji Nomura (Japanese); Patrick Seitz (English)
The Duke of Camellia who makes a pact with dark powers to rebel against Hortensia and take control for himself. He can transform into a giant werewolf.
Roy Bachelot (ロイ・バッシュロ, Roi Basshuro)
Voiced by: Takuya Eguchi (Japanese); Jonah Scott (English)
A master archer who serves under Rugis, he wields a custom-made bow that allows him to defend himself at close range as well as shoot down targets from afar.
Bernadette Albert (ベルナデッタ・オーベル, Berunadetta Ōberu)
Voiced by: Yuka Ōtsubo
Alexis Vall d'Hebron (アレクシ・バルデブロン, Arekushi Barudeburon)
Voiced by: Kazuma Horie (Japanese); Daman Mills (English)
Didier Viardot (ディディエ・ヴィアルドー, Didie Viarudō)
Voiced by: Shūichi Ikeda (Japanese); Kent Williams (English)
Palthouser Dreadnought (バルトハウザー・ドレッドノート, Barutohauzā Doreddonōto)
Voiced by: Takaya Hashi
Georg Dalmas (ゲオルグ・ダルマス, Georugu Darumasu)
Voiced by: Unshō Ishizuka (game), Atsuki Tani (anime)
A senior Knight Templar of Hortensia forced to work with the Church after the Pope uses Charlot to give the Church's own knights authority over the Knights Templar.
Beltran De Boske (ベルトラン・デ・ボスケ, Berutoran de Bosuke)
Voiced by: Takehito Koyasu
Saria/Elva (サリア/エルヴァ, Saria/Eruvua)
Voiced by: Rie Kugimiya
A pair of young Dayerehan twins who wield dark magic and can summon some monsters.
Charlot D'Hortensia (シャルロ・ド・オルタンシア, Sharuro do Orutanshia)
Voiced by: Miyuki Sawashiro
A young boy who was crowned King of Hortensia after his father died and his older sister, the Princess, went missing during the rebellion. Currently used as a puppet ruler under the Pope.
Marie (マリー, Marī)
Voiced by: Shizuka Itō
Jim McNeil (ジム・マクニール, Jimu Makunīru)
Voiced by: Toshiyuki Morikawa
Adel (アデル, Aderu)
Voiced by: Toshiyuki Morikawa
Gaston (ガストン, Gasuton)
Voiced by: Kōji Ishii
Lucan (ルーカン, Rūkan)
Voiced by: Takahiro Sakurai
Doctor Graff (ドクトル・グレフ, Dokutoru Gurefu)
Voiced by: Shigeru Chiba
Lacroix (ラクロワ, Rakurowa)
Voiced by: Kana Asumi

== Media ==
=== Manga ===
A manga adaptation illustrated by Pon Jea and Seiji was serialized in Media Factory's seinen manga magazine Monthly Comic Alive from March 27 to November 27, 2020.

==== Volumes ====
No.	Release date	ISBN
1	December 23, 2020	978-4-04-064706-7
Chapters 1–4
2	January 21, 2021	978-4-04-680140-1
Chapters 5–8

=== Anime ===
An anime television series adaptation by Liden Films was announced on December 28, 2019. The series was directed by Yasuto Nishikata and written by Rintarō Ikeda, with character designs by Takayuki Onoda and music by Zenta. It aired from January 7 to March 25, 2021. (Note: Tokyo MX listed the series premiere at 24:30 on January 6, 2021, which is January 7 at 12:30 a.m.) The opening theme is "LEADER" performed by MY FIRST STORY. Mafumafu performed the first ending theme "Night Dream and Daydream" (夜想と白昼夢, Yasō to Hakuchūmu) from Episodes 1–7 and 9–12, while Yui Horie performed the second ending theme "VEIL" for Episode 8 as her character Mariel D'Hortensia.

Funimation licensed the series and streamed it on its website in North America and the British Isles, in Europe through Wakanim, and in Australia and New Zealand through AnimeLab. On October 29, 2021, Funimation announced the series would receive an English dub, which premiered the following day. Following Sony's acquisition of Crunchyroll, the series was moved to Crunchyroll. In Southeast Asia, Muse Communication has licensed the series and streamed it on Bilibili.

==== Episodes ====
No.	Title (Note: All English titles are taken from Funimation.)	Directed by	Written by	Original release date
1	"Resolve ~The Conflict with Camellia~"; Transliteration: "Kakugo ～Kameria to no Tatakai～" (Japanese: 覚悟 ～カメリアとの戦い～)	Keishi Kawakubo	Rintarō Ikeda	January 7, 2021
December 5, 767, of the New Holy Era, the forces of Camellia rebel against their allies in the Kingdom of Hortensia. Duke Rugis Camellia transforms into a werewolf and slaughters the King of Hortensia and a few of his Knights Templar, while his Camellia knights and a force of magical monsters wreak havoc across the capital. Maurice Baudelaire barely manages to escape after losing an eye in the battle, delivering Fernando Albert's sword to his son Alfred, as well as a boy named Marius that he rescued. Hortensia manages to survive the rebellion, but with the King dead and the Princess Mariel missing, Hortensia's next king is a young boy named Charlot. Two weeks later, after mourning their dead relatives, Alfred and Marius begin training under Maurice to get revenge on Camellia. Four years later, Alfred and Marius join their first real battle with Hortensia soldiers, but find themselves under attack by a skilled Camellia archer unit led by Roy Bachelot, who easily beats Alfred and Marius with his custom bow, but retreats when Maurice steps in.
2	"Memories ~The Lore of Magonia~"; Transliteration: "Kioku ～Magonia no Denshō～" (Japanese: 記憶 ～マゴニアの伝承～)	Ishii Akira	Rintarō Ikeda	January 14, 2021
A floating island called Magonia is rumored to grant a wish to those who reach it, but is also rumored to be the source of the monsters that appeared in Hortensia during the rebellion and still roam around the countryside. Flashbacks to the night of Camellia's rebellion show Maurice spiriting Princess Mariel away from the castle with the help of fellow knight Georg Dalmas. Georg tells him the new Pope of the Orthodox Church, Alexi Baldebron, secretly planned the coup behind the scenes so he could place Charlot on the throne and rule Hortensia through him. As Maurice fled the castle, he asked Mariel to cut her hair to make it easier to hide her from their pursuers, which she reluctantly did. In the present, Alfred and Marius hear rumors of a shapeshifting monster terrorizing a nearby village. A young boy gets lost in the nearby caves, as Alfred and Marius go to rescue him. However, they get lost in the labyrinth, so Nonnoria Folley goes to rescue him herself. She manages to find the boy but both of them are attacked by monsters, and are saved at the last moment by Alfred.
3	"Repose of Souls ~To the Quarantined Village~"; Transliteration: "Chinkon ～Kakurisareta Mura e～" (Japanese: 鎮魂 ～隔離された村へ～)	Norikazu Ishigōoka	Yū Satō	January 21, 2021
Even though Charlot is the current King of Hortensia, his underage status allows the Pope to appoint himself his legal guardian. Georg calls upon Maurice to investigate a quarantined village full of monsters that appear human. Maurice takes Alfred and Marius to the village, where they run into former bounty hunter Deflotte Danois and a village full of zombies. Deflotte does not trust them until Maurice informs him the bodies were not the dead villagers that Deflotte grew up with. Deflotte reveals that he was born in the village, and his father was the head priest who hated that he left, but the Pope quarantined the village to stop the spread of a plague, so the priest led the village in prayer until he was the last man alive. Soon after finding the priest's diary, the Ecclesiastical Knights threaten to burn what is left of the village, when a giant monster appears. Marius uses a flower that Deflotte left to hold the monster long enough for the group to finish it off. Later, Deflotte decides to join the group as they decide to find out if Georg sold them out to the Church.
4	"Turnabout ~Prelude to Turmoil~"; Transliteration: "Kyūten ～Konmei e no Jokyoku～" (Japanese: 急転 ～混迷への序曲～)	Tarō Kubo	Yurika Miyao	January 28, 2021
With Camellia no longer allied with Hortensia, the Dayerehan Empire has begun probing Hortensia's defenses. Alfred and his group come across a merchant caravan with everyone brutally slaughtered except for two Dayerehan children. The group decides to take them to the Hortensia capital. At the capital, Georg tells Alfred and Maurice that he had nothing to do with the Ecclesiastical Knights trying to kill them. Suddenly, the main cathedral is attacked by monsters summoned by the two children from before, Saria and Elva, who demand the Pope hand over a relic that Rugis instructed them to find. Alfred and his allies break through the demonic ghosts surrounding the cathedral and manage to subdue the twins with the Pope's help. Suddenly, a giant dragon, the Salamander of Magonian legend, breaks into the cathedral, but the black knight Didier Viardot quickly cuts it down with his large weapons. The Salamander takes the twins and escapes the cathedral, later settling down in Camellia territory before transforming into a woman named Theresia. Meanwhile, Georg tells Maurice that the Pope and Didier were the ones with the authority to send the knights to burn the village without his knowledge.
5	"Impact ~The Protected One~"; Transliteration: "Shōtotsu ～Mamorareru Mono～" (Japanese: 衝突 ～守られるもの～)	Hiroshi Kimura	Rintarō Ikeda	February 4, 2021
After Leon Olivier died during the rebellion, his daughter Adelheid was set to inherit the Olivier Dominion. However, the Church instead used the newly-installed King Charlot to make Olivier a vassal state under Hortensia. Alfred's party tries to meet with Adelheid to leverage Olivier against the Church, but Didier arrives with several knights to arrest Adelheid for alleged treason against Hortensia. Marius and Deflotte plan to fight back and Alfred hesitates to raise his sword against Hortensia, when Camellia suddenly stages an attack on Olivier's port. Didier's knights, Alfred's party, and Adelheid's forces all join together to repel the invaders, including Roy who reappears on the battlefield. However, Roy mysteriously retreats with the rest of his forces midway through battle. After the battle, Alfred convinces Didier not to arrest Adelheid for now. Elsewhere, Duke Rugis explains that he simply wished to fake an invasion through Olivier to build up Adelheid and drive a wedge between her forces and Hortensia, but Roy and Theresia believe there was another motive behind his decision.
6	"True or False ~The Burden of a Princess~"; Transliteration: "Shingi ～Ōjo no Omomi～" (Japanese: 真偽 ～王女の重み～)	Masatoyo Takada	Yurika Miyao	February 11, 2021
Marius tells Deflotte about a legend of how a princess was protected by a giant. Alfred and Maurice then show up, revealing that a young woman claiming to be Princess Mariel has been spotted on Juin Island. When they arrive on the island, they witness the young woman addressing her volunteer army. Afterwards, the young woman learns the Church is looking for her. Meanwhile, Saria and Elva have also arrived on the island. When the young woman, whose real name is Marie, is later confronted, she reveals she and her childhood friend Jim lied about her identity in order to give the island hope. As such, Marius decides to help her. While they are alone, Marie tells Marius how Jim has always looked out for her. She then decides to reveal the truth to everyone, which Jim agrees with. When they do so, they are attacked by Saria and Elva. However, when the fake giant approaches Marius, it disappears. The next day, Marie and Jim thanks Alfred's party for helping them. Additionally, Marie asks Marius to relay a message to the real princess.
7	"Dilemma ~A Truth Revealed~"; Transliteration: "Kyūchi ～Abakareta Shinjitsu～" (Japanese: 窮地 ～暴かれた真実～)	Keishi Kawakubo	Yū Satō	February 18, 2021
Alfred, Marius, and Deflotte head to Cocon Village after they hear a rumor that it is now a ghost town. When they arrive there, they learn that the village has been controlled by the Church for nearly two years. Just then, a former priest named Adel shows up. He takes the party to Gnoll Hospital where he asks them to help him liberate the patients of the petridermic plague. However, Alfred is reluctant to act thanks to the power the Church has. While they are underground, they are attacked by zombies. Once they reach the basement of the hospital, they are confronted by Doctor Graff and his bodyguard Gaston. Graff admits that he has been conducting experiments on the patients under the Pope's orders. After they defeat Gaston, Didier arrives and he discovers Marius' true identity.
8	"Lamplight ~The Return of the Princess~"; Transliteration: "Tomoshibi ～Ōjo no Kikan～" (Japanese: 灯火 ～王女の帰還～)	Tsuyoshi Tobita	Rintarō Ikeda	February 25, 2021
A month later, Alfred and Deflotte are at the Fairie Tour Prison where they encounter Lucan de Luch, a friend of Alfred's, who reveals that Marius will be executed. Sometime later, Maurice shows up to aid in Alfred and Deflotte's escape. Meanwhile, Marius is interrogated when Didier arrives, revealing he knows she is really Princess Mariel. He then admits that he locked away a portion of her memories when she was young. Just as Marius is about to executed, she is rescued by her friends and allies. Afterwards, Marius reveals her true identity to Alfred, which causes him to swear his allegiance to her.
9	"The Witch ~A Trial into the Past~"; Transliteration: "Majo ～Kako e no Shiren～" (Japanese: 魔女 ～過去への試練～)	Masashi Nakamura	Yurika Miyao	March 4, 2021
After being briefed on the current situation, Rugis declares that a turning point of Hortensia's history is soon approaching. Meanwhile, Adelheid gives a speech telling the anti-Church coalition to assemble in Olivier. Sometime later, she takes Alfred's party to meet a witch named Lacroix, who reveals witches are Magonian sentinels. She then uses her power to have Mariel relive her past prior to the rebellion. Mariel learns that her father's attempt to bring her mother back to life using a relic ultimately led to the tragedy that befell the kingdom. When she is given the opportunity to use it to undo the tragedy, Mariel refuses. Once Mariel awakens, Lacroix reveals the Pope has the relic and Mariel passed her trial. Thanks to this information, the party decides to head to the capital. Elsewhere, Theresia reports this to Rugis. A couple of weeks later, Mariel rallies the Liberation Army. On their way to the capital, they are ambushed by Saria and Elva.
10	"Showdown ~The March to Liberation~"; Transliteration: "Kessen ～Kaihō e no Kōgun～" (Japanese: 決戦 ～解放への行軍～)	Yuki Komada	Yū Satō	March 11, 2021
As Didier informs the Pope that the Liberation Army is heading to the capital, Flegal Dreadnought arrives to let them know that he is ready for battle. Meanwhile, Roy drives Saria and Elva away, revealing Camellia will not take any hostile action toward the army. Just then, they are ambushed by a unit of Ecclesiastical Knights carrying unknown weapons. After defeating the knights, the army learn the weapons are muskets. The next day, the army notices the elite squads of the Royal Order are blocking their path. They then discover Flegal is the commander of said squads. Once the battle commences, Camellia forces team up with the army. As the elite squads are being overwhelmed, Flegal reveals he removed his grandfather Balthauser, causing his allies to abandon him. Later on, he challenges Alfred to a duel, which Alfred wins. Afterwards, Flegal is shot and killed.
11	"Tug-of-War ~The Far Reaches of Conviction~"; Transliteration: "Kōbō ～Shinnen no Hate ni～" (Japanese: 攻防 ～信念の果てに～)	Tarō Kubo; Satoru Kakutani	Rintarō Ikeda	March 18, 2021
Three days later, the Liberation Army arrives at the capital. While the army is battling the Ecclesiastical Knights, Balthauser shows up, revealing he survived. Elsewhere, Rugis, Saria, and Elva head to the capital. Back in the capital, Alfred, Deflotte, and Maurice learn Georg is fighting against them. As such, Maurice decides to take him on. Meanwhile, Didier confronts and overwhelms Alfred, Deflotte, Mariel, and Adelheid. Just as Alfred is about shield Mariel, she distracts Didier long enough to allow Alfred to defeat him. Afterwards, it is revealed that the Pope is secretly the king's son. Later on, Alfred, Mariel, Deflotte, Maurice, and Adelheid are confronted by their deceased loved ones.
12	"Promise ~Once Again, on the Hill at Sunset~"; Transliteration: "Yakusoku ～Mō Ichido, Yūhi no Oka de～" (Japanese: 約束 ～もう一度、夕日の丘で～)	Keishi Kawakubo	Rintarō Ikeda	March 25, 2021
Four years earlier, the king attempted and failed to resurrect his wife. The Pope then manipulated him into making Rugis angry, which ultimately led to the kingdom's tragedy. Back in the present, while Alfred, Maurice, and Adelheid are fighting their loved ones, they learn that the Pope is controlling their bodies. As such, Alfred and Adelheid reluctantly kill their fathers in order to set them free. Afterwards, a wounded Maurice decides to stay behind while Alfred and Mariel go ahead to confront the Pope. Elsewhere, Nonnoria and Kuu find Deflotte once his battle is over with. When Alfred and Mariel arrive at the Pope's location, he reveals to them the motivation for his actions. During the battle, Rugis provides assistance, which allows Alfred and Mariel to defeat the Pope. However, Alfred is mortally wounded when they discover Rugis was the werewolf who slaughtered everyone. Sometime later, as Mariel is giving a speech to the citizens, Lacroix reveals Mariel committed a taboo when she invoked a hidden power to resurrect Alfred.
Special	"'Hortensia Saga' TV Anime Broadcast Completion Special"; Transliteration: "'Orutanshia Sāga' Terebi Anime Hōsō Kanketsu Supesharu" (Japanese: 「オルタンシア・サーガ」TVアニメ放送完結スペシャル)	Keisuke Shinno; Tatsuya Nagata	N/A	April 1, 2021
A special that summarizes the series and promotes the game and home media release.
