= Macy Anne Johnson =

American voice actress

- Johnson speaking at a panel in 2025.
- Occupation: Voice actress
- Years active: 2017–present
- Notable credits: Swindler in Akudama Drive; Pop☆Step in My Hero Academia: Vigilantes; Howan in the Show By Rock!! franchise; Kaede in Gal & Dino
- Website: www.macyannejohnson.com

Macy Anne Johnson is an American voice actress, known for her work in anime dubs, film, and video games.

== Biography ==
A theater arts major, Johnson was cast in her first lead role as Yoshiko in Human Lost while still in college.

== Filmography ==
=== Animated Series ===
Selected Credits
| Year | Title | Role | Notes | Ref. |
|---|---|---|---|---|
| 2017 | Konohana Kitan | Aya | Credited as Macy Johnson | |
| 2018 | Hanebado! | Actress | | |
| 2018 | SSSS.Gridman | Marusan | | |
| 2018 | Hinomaru Sumo | Hinomaru (young) | | |
| 2018 | That Time I Got Reincarnated as a Slime | Pirino | | |
| 2019 | The Helpful Fox Senko-san | Little Yoko | | |
| 2019 | Dr. Stone | Ruby | | |
| 2019 | Arifureta: From Commonplace to World's Strongest | Nana | | |
| 2020 | Smile Down the Runway | Chiyuki Fujito | | |
| 2020 | Higurashi: When They Cry - Gou | Rumiko Chie | | |
| 2020 | Akudama Drive | Ordinary Person/Swindler | | |
| 2021 | Tamayomi: The Baseball Girls | Ryo | | |
| 2021 | Show By Rock!! Mashumairesh!! | Howan | | |
| 2021 | The World Ends with You: The Animation | Eri | | |
| 2021 | Miss Kobayashi's Dragon Maid S | Shouta | Season 2 | |
| 2021 | Restaurant to Another World | Rorona | Season 2 | |
| 2022 | Gekidol | Seira Morino | | |
| 2022 | Show By Rock!! Stars!! | Howan | | |
| 2022 | Gal & Dino | Kaede | | |
| 2022 | Love After World Domination | Haru/Pink Gelato | | |
| 2022 | Shikimori's Not Just a Cutie | Shikimori | | |
| 2022 | Spy × Family | Emile Elman | | |
| 2022 | Higehiro | Yuzuha | | |
| 2022 | Remake Our Life! | Nanako Kogure | | |
| 2022 | The Maid I Hired Recently Is Mysterious | Yuuri | | |
| 2022 | Shinobi no Ittoki | Ryoko Sukuno | | |
| 2022 | More Than a Married Couple, But Not Lovers | Shiori | | |
| 2022 | The Daily Life of the Immortal King | Xiaoyu Lin | Seasons 2-5 | |
| 2023 | The Iceblade Sorcerer Shall Rule the World | Rebecca Bradley | | |
| 2023 | Trigun Stampede | Rollo | | |
| 2023 | The Ice Guy and His Cool Female Colleague | Nyamero | | |
| 2023 | Hell's Paradise | Mei | | |
| 2023 | Reborn as a Vending Machine, I Now Wander the Dungeon | Suori | | |
| 2023 | A Returner's Magic Should Be Special | Pram Schneider | Seasons 1-2 | |
| 2024 | Banished from the Hero's Party | Lavender | | |
| 2024 | Quality Assurance in Another World | Namiko | | |
| 2024 | After-School Hanako-kun | Tiara | Season 2 | |
| 2025 | My Hero Academia: Vigilantes | Pop☆Step | Seasons 1-2 | |
| 2025 | Lord of Mysteries | Daly | | |
| 2025 | Campfire Cooking in Another World with My Absurd Skill | Ninrir | Season 2 | |

=== Film ===
- Human Lost (2019), Yoshiko
- One Piece: Stampede (2019), Ann
- Sing a Bit of Harmony (2022), Mayumi
- Spy x Family Code: White (2023), Emil

=== Video games ===
- Fantasian Neo Dimension (2024), Clicker
- SMITE (2014), Dreadful Doll Izanami, Shadow Claw Bastet, Adventurer's Guild Bastet
- Paladins (2018), Emerald Bandit Maeve, Replicant Ying
- MiSide (2024), Mita, Crazy Mita, Kind Mita
