= High-Rise Invasion =

Japanese manga series

- Second tankōbon volume cover of High-Rise Invasion, featuring protagonist Yuri Honjo

天空侵犯 (Tenkū Shinpan)
- Genre: Action; Isekai; Survival
- Manga
- Written by: Tsuina Miura
- Illustrated by: Takahiro Oba
- Published by: Kodansha
- English publisher: NA: Seven Seas Entertainment
- Magazine: Manga Box
- Original run: December 5, 2013 – April 4, 2019
- Volumes: 21
- Manga

High-Rise Invasion Arrive
- Written by: Tsuina Miura
- Illustrated by: Takahiro Oba
- Published by: Kodansha
- Magazine: Magazine Pocket
- Original run: July 28, 2019 – April 24, 2021
- Volumes: 7
- Original net animation
- Directed by: Masahiro Takata
- Written by: Touko Machida
- Music by: tatsuo; Youichi Sakai
- Studio: Zero-G
- Licensed by: Netflix
- Released: February 25, 2021
- Runtime: 25–27 minutes
- Episodes: 12
- icon

High-Rise Invasion (Japanese: 天空侵犯, Hepburn: Tenkū Shinpan) is a Japanese manga series written by Tsuina Miura and illustrated by Takahiro Oba. The series was serialized online in DeNA's Manga Box app from December 2013 to April 2019, with Kodansha compiling it into twenty-one tankōbon volumes. The manga is licensed in North America by Seven Seas Entertainment. A sequel manga titled High-Rise Invasion Arrive (Japanese: 天空侵犯arrive, Hepburn: Tenkū Shipan Arrive) was serialized in Kodansha's Magazine Pocket website and app from July 2019 to April 2021, with seven tankōbon volumes released.

An original net animation (ONA) series adaptation produced by Zero-G streamed worldwide on Netflix in February 2021.

== Premise ==
High school student Yuri Honjo suddenly finds herself on the rooftop of a high-rise building in a surreal world consisting entirely of interconnected skyscrapers with no reachable ground. Hunted by mysterious masked figures, she must navigate the hostility to survive, find an escape, and locate her brother, Rika, who is also trapped in the same world.

== Characters ==
Yuri Honjo (本城 遊理, Honjō Yuri)
Voiced by: Haruka Shiraishi (Japanese); Suzie Yeung (English)
Yuri is a schoolgirl who was suddenly transported into a strange world filled with high-rise buildings where she and others like her are chased by killers donning mysterious white masks. Upon realizing that her older brother Rika has also been transported to this bizarre world, the two siblings decide to find each other and look for a way to escape. She has a brother complex.
Mayuko Nise (二瀬 真由子, Nise Mayuko)
Voiced by: Shiki Aoki (Japanese); Jennie Kwan (English)
Mayuko is one of the people transported to the mysterious skyscraper world. Bullied and neglected by everyone, including her parents, Mayuko became a merciless killer in this new world, unwilling to trust anyone. However, after being saved by Yuri, Mayuko devotes herself to helping Yuri. After they become friends, Mayuko develops feelings for Yuri.
Kuon Shinzaki (新崎 九遠, Shinzaki Kuon)
Voiced by: Akira Sekine (Japanese); Stephanie Sheh (English)
Kuon is a God Candidate. She is sometimes referred to as the Railgun User. Kuon is delicate and innocent in all matters. Having adapted to a high social etiquette, she did not have the capability to understand the dangerous world at first sight. Throughout the travels with her companion, Sniper Mask, she is able to show her abilities, yet she remains naive and humble nonetheless. She finds Sniper Mask intriguing and mysterious, which leads her to develop feelings for him due to his care for her.
Rika Honjo (本城 理火, Honjō Rika)
Voiced by: Junya Enoki (Japanese); Zeno Robinson (English)
Rika is the older brother of Yuri and one of the people transported to the mysterious skyscraper world. His dependable character leads him to quickly become the leader of a small human group working hard to find a way out of this world while keeping contact with his sister through his phone to give her advice and exchange information.
Sniper Mask (スナイパー仮面, Sunaipā Kamen)
Voiced by: Yūichirō Umehara, Chisato Mori^{Ep. 10 credits} (young) (Japanese); Jonah Scott (English)
Also known as "Mr. Mask", Sniper Mask is an Angel who wields a sniper rifle. He has an unknown connection to Rika.
Kazuma Aohara (青原 和真, Aohara Kazuma)
Voiced by: Kōji Yusa
Aohara is a God Candidate who controls the Angels Ein and Zwei. He is initially obsessed with becoming a Perfect God, but after being defeated by Yuri, he becomes her ally.
Yayoi Kusakabe (日下部 弥生, Kusakabe Yayoi)
Voiced by: Yoko Hikasa (Japanese); Cristina Vee^{Ep. 6 credits} (English)
Kusakabe is an Angel who serves Aikawa.
Mamoru Aikawa (相川 守, Aikawa Mamoru)
Voiced by: Jun Fukuyama (Japanese); Johnny Yong Bosch^{Ep. 8 credits} (English)
Aikawa is a God Candidate who controls thirty Angels.

== Media ==
=== Manga ===
The manga was serialized online in DeNA's Manga Box app from December 5, 2013, to April 4, 2019. Kodansha held the license to publish the series and compiled it into twenty-one tankōbon volumes, while Seven Seas Entertainment published it in two-in-one omnibus volumes in North America from June 2018 to October 2021. A sequel manga, titled High-Rise Invasion Arrive, was serialized in Kodansha's Magazine Pocket website and app from July 28, 2019, to April 24, 2021, and was compiled into seven volumes.

=== Anime ===
At the Netflix Anime Festival on October 26, 2020, an original net animation (ONA) anime series adaptation was announced with a February 2021 release window. In mid-January 2021, Netflix revealed that the series was scheduled for a February 25 release on the streaming service. The series was animated by Zero-G and directed by Masahiro Takata, with Touko Machida handling series' composition, Yōichi Ueda designing the characters, and tatsuo and Youichi Sakai composing the series' music. EMPiRE performed the opening theme "HON-NO," while Have a Nice Day! performed the ending theme "My Name Is Blue" (わたしの名はブルー, Watashi no Na wa Burū).

==== Episodes ====
| No. | Title (Note: All English titles are taken from Netflix.) | Directed by (Note: Information is taken from the ending credits of each episode.) | Written by | Original release date |
|---|---|---|---|---|
| 1 | "I Just Don't Get This World"; Transliteration: "Wake Wakannai, Kono Sekai" (Japanese: わけわかんない、この世界) | Masahiro Takata | Tōko Machida | February 25, 2021 |
Yuri Honjo appears on the roof of a building. Frantic, she calls her brother, Rika, who explains the "world" they are in. Masked figures run amok, despairing people to commit suicide by jumping off roofs, which Yuri witnesses. A Mask then attacks her. As she reaches an adjacent roof, a police officer shoots the Mask. Another officer, Mizushita, assesses the scene, but then pushes the first officer off the roof. Mizushita attempts to sexually assault Yuri when a masked sniper shoots Mizushita. Yuri burns Mizushita's body and takes his gun. Yuri is then spotted by Maid Mask. When Yuri shoots the mask, she learns of another secret of the world: the Masks are humans who are ordered by a God Command to do tasks. The Command then orders Maid Mask to commit suicide. Shaken, Yuri vows to defeat the God Command by any means necessary. As she makes her way to another building, she spots a helicopter, which can transport one person out of the world at certain time intervals. Making her way to the helicopter, Yuri finds a girl threatening a man, but the girl is not wearing a mask.
| 2 | "I've Found a New Goal"; Transliteration: "Mitsukatta, Atarashii Mokuhyō ga" (Japanese: 見つかった、新しい目標が) | Kenta Ōnishi | Tōko Machida | February 25, 2021 |
The girl, Mayuko Nise, kills the man then threatens to kill Yuri. However, they call a truce. As they are talking, Yuri protects Mayuko from Sniper Mask. Reminiscing about her past, Mayuko decides to team up with Yuri to make their way to the helicopter. As a distraction, a grenade is lobbed down the stairs as Sniper Mask follows them. Mayuko and Yuri get to know each other and makes their way to the helipad. When the helicopter departs, Yuri shoots at it. Believing it is their way out, Yuri decides to create alliances and hijack the helicopter. Elsewhere, Sniper Mask partially regains his memories back. Yuri reminisces when she saw an extremely tall skyscraper that was only visible to her before being teleported to the new world. Believing that Mayuko abandoned her, she makes her way to another building when she gets spotted by trio of Masks. As two of the three die by a member of their own trio, Mayuko provides cover before being attacked by the third. Yuri and Mayuko shoots the Mask, who then commits suicide.
| 3 | "I'm Sorry, Mayuko Nise"; Transliteration: "Gomen ne, Nise Mayuko-san..." (Japanese: ごめんね、二瀬真由子さん･･･) | Daisuke Kurose | Masahiro Takata | February 25, 2021 |
Yuri and Mayuko decide to become allies. When Yuri contacts Rika to let him know what has happened, he orders her to kill Mayuko. Yuri wholeheartedly disagrees as her ally is more important than her safety. Rika says it was a test to gauge her tenacity. Afterwards, Rika discusses his beliefs that a Mask can never become a human again, and killing every Mask is necessary to survive. A flashback shows that Rika and Sniper Mask had a brief altercation. Back in the present, Rika's allies, Takeda and Okihara, meet up when Baseball Mask lobs a cannonball at them, killing Takeda. Believing Baseball Mask is playing on an actual field, Rika fights him. Baseball Mask says that Rika is nowhere close to a "God" in this realm. Before any more information can be extracted, Okihara shoots Baseball Mask dead. Believing the realm is villainous, Rika vows to destroy the new world. Meanwhile, Sniper Mask tries to despair a girl to commit suicide when the God Command reveals to him that the girl is an individual that is fostered to become God, and the realm is a facility to create God.
| 4 | "I Won't Give in to This World"; Transliteration: "Konna Sekai ni Nante Makenai" (Japanese: こんな世界になんて負けない) | Tōru Kitahata | Masahiro Takata | February 25, 2021 |
The Command reiterates that the girl, Kuon Shinzaki, is a "God Candidate" and is being fostered to become God. The Angels, or Masks, have the task to supplement a Candidate. Sniper Mask accompanies Kuon despite not knowing the Command's order. Meanwhile, Yuri and Mayuko are given a bag from an emotionless Mask, which contains weapons and food. As Yuri sleeps, Mayuko and Rika awkwardly talk about Yuri's well-being and their alliance. On an adjacent roof, Chef Mask schemes to kidnap Mayuko. Yuri and Mayuko travel to another building, while Mayuko thinks about how Yuri accepts her despite having a troubled past. Chef Mask then kidnaps Mayuko, but Yuri catches wind of it. Chef Mask reveals that his mask has a defect, meaning that he gets orders, but kept his deranged will. Yuri shows up to injure him then Mayuko brutally kills him. They follow signs to a room where they are accosted by a group of humans. Suddenly, Rider Mask shows up and kills the group. When he targets Yuri, Mayuko puts on the defected mask to become an Angel.
| 5 | "That's an Incredible Ultimate Weapon"; Transliteration: "Are wa Tondemonai Saishū Heiki" (Japanese: あれはとんでもない最終兵器) | Tomoya Takayama | Tōko Machida | February 25, 2021 |
During the fight, Rider Mask shatters Mayuko's mask, revealing that her will is preserved. Mayuko and Yuri then take him down. As they leave, they are approached by Sachio Tanabe, a man who wants to kill God Candidates. He recalls that his allies were killed by an Angel of another Candidate named Kazuma Aohara. Meanwhile, Sniper Mask and Kuon overheard the conversation. When they confront Aohara, he proclaims that nothing can stop him from being the "Perfect God" and orders his Angel, Ein, to kill them. As Ein tires, Aohara orders his other Angel, Zwei, to attack, but gets quickly killed by Yuri. She recalls that a Candidate can control more than one Angel from a previous call with Rika. Desperate, Kuon tries to intervene by activating her "weapon." This causes a railgun to blow up a nearby building, which leads Aohara to believe Yuri did it. She uses her acting skills to make him surrender. Kuon vows to be the Perfect God to end the world. Elsewhere, Rikuya Yoshida, another Candidate, hopes to ally with Rika. Rika wonders how one becomes a Candidate; it is then revealed a person becomes one if they wear a mouthless mask.
| 6 | "If I Become a Perfect God"; Transliteration: ""Kanzen Naru Kami" ni Nareba..." (Japanese: 『完全なる神』になれば･･･) | Yū Kazūchi | Tōko Machida | February 25, 2021 |
Mayuko starts feeling the effects of wearing the mask. A distressed Yuri offers Mayuko to sit out, but she refuses. As they make their way to Yoshida, they reach a library where they find Bat Mask. Mayuko rashly attacks him, but gets knocked out. Sniper Mask then shows up and kills him. Thinking that he is an enemy, they run away. However, Sniper Mask hoped they could all team up. Afterwards, he recalls an encounter with Rika. He also recalls how he became an Angel; it was forcibly put on him by Yayoi Kusakabe, an Angel in a police uniform. Elsewhere, Mayuko believes that her masked alter-ego is taking over. She then collapses after Yuri stops her from committing suicide. Dealer Mask approaches Yuri and explains Mayuko's state as "hibernation", in which she has less than two hours to live, but can be saved by a Candidate. She also tells Yuri that there is a mouthless mask nearby, which will allow her to be a Candidate. Vowing to save Mayuko, Yuri departs. Unbeknownst to her, Mayuko is saved by Kuon minutes later. As Yuri goes to the mask, she is attacked by a skier Angel.
| 7 | "I Will End This Realm"; Transliteration: "Kono Ryōiki o Owaraseru" (Japanese: この領域を終わらせる) | Hiroyuki Furukawa | Masahiro Takata | February 25, 2021 |
Recalling Dealer Mask's instructions, Yuri finds the mouthless mask. As she puts it on, the God Command orders her to kill her opponent, which Yuri does. Meanwhile, as Rika finds more allies, it is revealed Kusakabe is monitoring them. When Yuri puts the mask back on, the Command tells her that her memories and consciousness will not be affected and that she can control Angels based on wavelength compatibility. Mayuko calls Yuri and lets her know that "a Candidate" saved her. Mayuko then demands to know everything from Kuon, while Yuri plans to keep moving forward to meet Yoshida. Elsewhere, Rika and his crew finally meet Yoshida and believes they can trust him. They are then suddenly ambushed by Kusakabe and her team. Rika tries fights off a halberdier Angel when Yoshida's Angels comes for support. Kusakabe orders her team to keep attacking when Rika collapses. While Yoshida's Angels and Rika's team fight them off, Swimmer Mask kidnaps Rika. Kusakabe recalls that she is supposed kidnap any competent human and take them to "that person." Later, Yuri receives a call informing her of Rika's kidnapping.
| 8 | "I've Cast Off My Humanity, But That's Fine"; Transliteration: "Ningen o Sutechatta... Kedo Sore de mo Ii" (Japanese: 人間を捨てちゃった･･･けどそれでもいい) | Akira Mano | Tōko Machida | February 25, 2021 |
An enraged Yuri vows to save Rika. Meanwhile, Mayuko encounters a pair of Angels. However, Sniper Mask saves her. Knowing that they are at a tough situation, Yuri comes to the rescue. One of the Angels launches grenades at them, but Yuri destroys it. The Angels are then killed by Yuri and Sniper Mask. Afterwards, Kuon introduces herself to Yuri and confirms that they are God Candidates. Elsewhere, Rika is finally taken to see "that person", whose name is Mamoru Aikawa. Aikawa talks about his plan for the new world and he wants Rika to be his ally. They head to a rooftop where Aikawa further explains that in order to be the Perfect God, a Candidate must go to the railgun tower. As such, he believes that his loyal team can supplement him to be God. As Kuon wonders the connection between Sniper Mask and Rika, a helicopter flies over the city. It stops at the helipad Aikawa is at then flies away. Aikawa confirms that the angry masked Angels, or Guardian Angels, are trying to prevent Candidates from becoming God.
| 9 | "Which of Us Will Live a Cool Life?"; Transliteration: "Dochira ga Kakko Ii Ikikata o Suru no ka" (Japanese: どちらがカッコいい生き方をするのか) | Hisaya Takabayashi | Tōko Machida | February 25, 2021 |
Aikawa orders a squad to guard a helipad and kill any trespassers. He then orders Kusakabe and his Superior Angels to eliminate Yuri and any other Candidates. Meanwhile, White Feather, one of Aikawa's Angels, duels with Sniper Mask, with White Feather gaining the upper hand. With Sniper Mask in trouble, Kuon decides to fire her railgun, but only then Ein shows up at White Feather's roof, and manages to escape, with Sniper Mask being all right. Kazuma Aohara surmises that Yuri is nearby and hopes to meet her. A kid named Uzuki, Sachio Tanabe, and Aohara goes to meet with Yuri. White Feather reports to Aikawa, who surmises that the railgun user is possibly on the east end, where Yuri is, and proclaims to be the Perfect God. As Yuri and her people reach the rendezvous point, Mayuko wonders if Kuon is the railgun user, which is proven true. Elsewhere, Aikawa gets information to where the railgun user is. Afterwards, Sniper Mask shows up and talks about how strong Yuri has become. As he and Kuon leave, Aohara and his allies meet with Yuri. Kuon tells Sniper Mask that their enemy (Aikawa) has a hostage, Rika. Kusakabe starts interrogating Rika.
| 10 | "Our Enemy Is One Who Desires Chaos"; Transliteration: "Teki wa "Konton o Nozomu Mono"" (Japanese: 敵は『混沌を望む者』) | Kenta Ōnishi | Tōko Machida | February 25, 2021 |
Kusakabe learns that Rika knows Sniper Mask personally, and tries to turn him into an Angel, but Rika injures himself. He proclaims that Sniper Mask is strong enough to beat Aikawa before he passes out. Meanwhile, Sniper Mask and Kuon talk about Rika when the hibernation program is activated. He tells Kuon to save him once the time comes. Aohara lets Yuri know that Aikawa is trying to kill other Candidates. Kuon then informs Yuri and Mayuko about Sniper Mask's state and wants Yuri to talk to him. Yuri talks about Rika to him and wonders of their connection. Yoshida receives a report from his Angel of Rika's whereabouts and to meet with Yuri. After Sniper Mask and Yuri have a conversation, he enters hibernation. From another building, Student Mask, one of Aikawa's Angels, watches Yuri. Kuon, Mayuko, and Mayuko's Angel alter-ego dive into Sniper Mask's brain and subsequently his dream. There, they meet a young Sniper Mask talking to a young Rika, who calls him "Yuka Makoto". Once Kuon ends his hibernation, the girls leave his dream. Later, Yuri finds a band of Masks and kills them while Student Mask watches.
| 11 | "I AM Justice!"; Transliteration: "Ware Koso ga Seigi!" (Japanese: 我こそが正義！) | Ryōichi Kuraya | Masahiro Takata | February 25, 2021 |
Student Mask attacks Yuri in the name of Aikawa. Just then, Mayuko arrives and saves her. After Student Mask talks about Aikawa's beliefs, Yuri decides that she will kill him as a step to end the world. Meanwhile, Aikawa announces that his team of Kusakabe, Swimmer Mask and the Archangel are going to assassinate Yuri's people. Kusakabe recalls the time when she and Aikawa met Archangel; Archangel sees everything as evil and killing people is justice. It is that belief that made Aikawa compatible to control him. One of Yoshida's Angels report on Kusakabe, Archangel and Rika's whereabouts. Elsewhere, Yuri receives Yoshida's report and also the news that Kusakabe's squad is closing in. Aohara tries to extract info from Student Mask and also announces that he has the power to stop an Angel from moving for a second. Yuri and her people then get ready for the final battle. Before Sniper Mask can shoot Kusakabe, Uzuki reveals she is his mother. Swimmer Mask and Archangel fight Yuri, Ein, and Mayuko, when Aikawa activates Archangel's full power. Archangel runs after Aikawa, with Mayuko and Ein following, while Yuri fights off Swimmer Mask.
| 12 | "This Is a High-Rise Invasion"; Transliteration: "Kore Koso ga Tenkū Shinpan" (Japanese: これこそが天空侵犯) | Tōru Kitahata | Masahiro Takata | February 25, 2021 |
Makoto tries to shoot at Archangel, but he stops the bullet with his fingers. Ein sneaks up on Archangel, but cannot take him down. Just then, Aohara uses his power, which allows Ein and Mayuko to injure Archangel. Archangel uses Makoto's spare bullet and shoots it, hitting Aohara in the neck. As Ein tends to Aohara, Mayuko calls upon her Angel alter-ego to complete "defragmentation." To buy time, Tanabe shows up and confuses Archangel. With Mayuko's defragmentation complete, her combat skills matches Archangel. Yuri ends up killing Swimmer Mask, while Kuon calms down to use their final attack. Mayuko signals Kuon to use the railgun. Kusakabe attempts to report to Aikawa, but escapes. Archangel comes out of the rubble. Before Yuri can kill Archangel, the God Command announces that their wavelengths matched, therefore she can control him. Unsure what to do, Tanabe convinces Yuri to control him. Despite Yuri's team winning the battle, Aohara dies. Elsewhere, Aikawa learns of Yuri's existence, and informs Rika of using him as leverage to make Yuri surrender. When Rika rejects Aikawa's proposal, Aikawa activates the Angel Command onto him.

== Reception ==
Jean-Karlo Lemus and Steve Jones reviewed the series in their "This Week in Anime" segment for Anime News Network. Lemus said that the series does not give the "best first impression," and while he hated it when he first started watching, he became "indifferent," comparing it to Gantz, adding that the series "preoccupied itself with panty shots and various states of undress." Jones, however, praised the portrayal of the villains and hoped that a second season of the series would be produced, while acknowledging it is "not for everyone."
