= Jonah Scott =

American voice actor (born 1993)

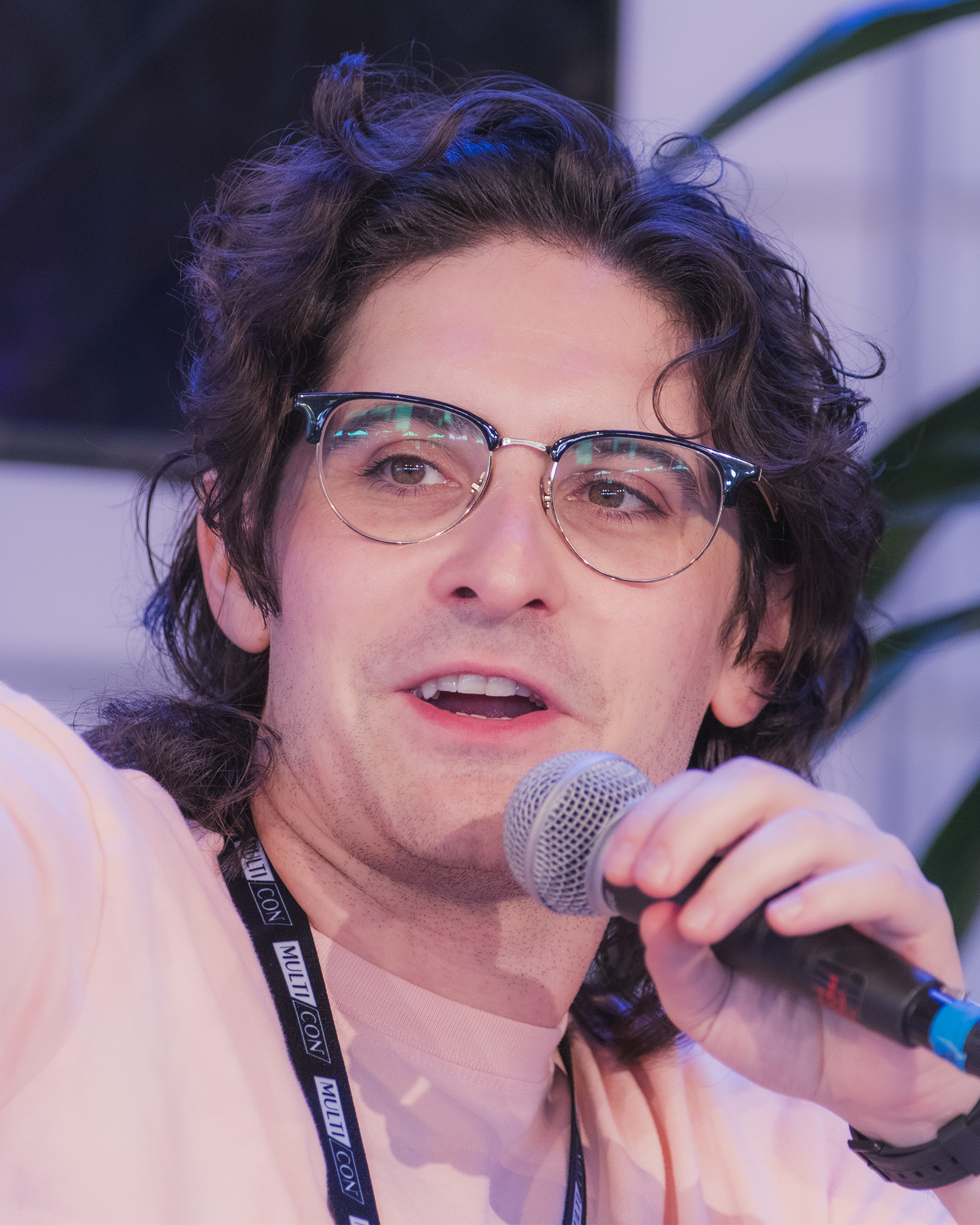
- Scott in 2026
- Born: September 8, 1993 (age 33)
- Occupation: Voice actor
- Years active: 2015–present

Jonah Scott (born September 8, 1993) is an American voice actor. He is known for his roles in Beastars as Legoshi, Akudama Drive as Courier, High-Rise Invasion as Sniper Mask, Dying Light 2: Stay Human as Aiden Caldwell, SK8 the Infinity as Joe, Blue Lock as Oliver Aiku, and Disney's Twisted Wonderland: The Animation as Jade Leech.

== Biography ==
Before becoming a voice actor, Scott worked in manual trades, such as roofing. He is bisexual.

== Filmography ==
=== Anime ===
List of voice performances in anime
Year	Title	Role	Notes	Source
2019–24	Kengan Ashura	Lihito, Raruma the 13th, Mitsuyo		
2019–present	One-Punch Man	Phoenix Man		
2020	JoJo's Bizarre Adventure	Formaggio	TV series	
2020	Drifting Dragons	Vadakin		
2020	Akudama Drive	Courier		
2020–26	Beastars	Legoshi	First lead role	
2021	Kuroko's Basketball	Kosuke Wakamatsu		
2021	Attack on Titan	Willy Tybur	Season 4	
2021	Gleipnir	Sakuma		
2021	Fire Force	Takagi Oze	Season 2	
2021	SK8 the Infinity	Joe		
2021	High-Rise Invasion	Sniper Mask		
2021–23	The Way of the Househusband	Tatsu	Lead role	
2021	Record of Ragnarok	Adam, Seijuro Yoshioka		
2021	86	Raiden Shuga		
2021	Edens Zero	Jinn		
2021	A3!	Omi		
2021	Kageki Shojo!!	Kouzaburou Shirakawa		
2021	Re-Main	Riku Momosaki		
2021	Hortensia Saga	Roy Bachelot		
2021	Irina: The Vampire Cosmonaut	Mikhail		
2021	Talentless Nana	Jin Tachibana		
2021	Super Crooks	Johnny Bolt	Lead role	
2022	Scar on the Praeter	Ran		
2022	Sasaki and Miyano	Jiro Ogasawara		
2022	The Prince of Tennis	Kunimitsu Tezuka		
2022	Moriarty the Patriot	Herschel		
2022	One Piece	Charlotte Katakuri		
2022	Given	Akihiko Kaji		
2022	The Yakuza's Guide to Babysitting	Kirishima		
2023	The Misfit of Demon King Academy	Erdomaid DittiJohn	Season 2	
2023	Demon Slayer: Kimetsu no Yaiba	Kokushibo	Season 3	
2023	Tengoku Daimakyo	Juichi		
2023	Akuma-kun	Hiroki		
2024	Metallic Rouge	Afdal Bashar		
2024	Kaiju No. 8	Aoi Kaguragi		
2024	My Hero Academia	Tajima	Season 7	
2024	Mission: Yozakura Family	Seiji Hotokeyama		
2024	Black Butler	Herman Greenhill	Season 4	
2024	Spice and Wolf: Merchant Meets the Wise Wolf	Merchant		
2024–25	Campfire Cooking in Another World with My Absurd Skill	Fel		
2024–25	Go! Go! Loser Ranger!	Red Keeper		
2024–present	Undead Unluck	Billy Alfred, Chikara's Father		
2024–present	The Elusive Samurai	Ashikaga Takauji		
2024–present	Ranma ½	Tatewaki Kuno	2024 series	
2024–present	Blue Lock	Oliver Aiku		
2025–present	Disney Twisted-Wonderland: The Animation	Jade Leech		
2026	Frieren: Beyond Journey's End	Revolte	Season 2	

=== Films ===
Year	Title	Role	Notes
2021	We Couldn't Become Adults	Keiichiro	Lead role, English dub
2022	One Piece Film: Red	Charlotte Katakuri	English dub
2022	That Time I Got Reincarnated as a Slime the Movie: Scarlet Bond	Hiiro	English dub
2023	The First Slam Dunk	Hisashi Mitsui	Lead role, English dub
2023	Case Closed: The Scarlet Bullet	Subaru Okiya	English dub

=== Web ===
Year	Title	Role	Notes
2019	My Inner Demons	Rhal	
2017–22	Death Battle	Thor, Jiraiya	Episode 84: "Thor VS Wonder Woman (Marvel vs. DC)"; Episode 102: "Roshi VS Jiraiya (Dragon Ball vs. Naruto)"; Episode 159: "Thor VS Vegeta (Marvel vs. Dragon Ball)"
2023	Drawfee Show	Karina (voice)	"Did Anyone Remember To Make The Anniversary Merch Ad?" "Here's What You Missed Last Time On Drawfee"
2023–24	5 Years Later	Eon, Technus, Jack Fenton	Lead role
2025	The Unexpectables II	Halva	DnD Podcast Guest Role "111-121"
2026	Wolfstory	Silas (Bad Guy)(voice)	
TBA	Far-Fetched †	Warren Webber (voice)	Main cast; YouTube webseries

=== Video games ===
List of voice performances in video games
Year	Title	Role	Notes	Source
2015	Seduce Me the Otome	Damien		
2016	Seduce Me 2: The Demon War	Damien		
2017–present	Yandere Simulator	Riku Soma, Info-kun		
2019	The Legend of Heroes: Trails of Cold Steel III	Randy Orlando		
2020	The Legend of Heroes: Trails of Cold Steel IV	Randy Orlando		
2020	The Elder Scrolls Online	Count Verandis Ravenwatch		
2022	Dying Light 2 Stay Human	Aiden Caldwell	Lead role	
2022	The Divine Speaker	Leos		
2022	We Never Left	Michael		
2022	When The Night Comes	August Willenheim	Lead Role	
2022	Shadowverse	Taketsumi	Chapters Empyrean Inn and Whispers of Purgation	
2022	Arena of Valor	Stuart (The Collector)	Reskin of old joker character	
2023	Fire Emblem Engage	Additional voices		
2023	The Legend of Heroes: Trails into Reverie	Randy Orlando, Vesse, Division Soldier		
2023	Komorebi	Zero / Kyron		
2023	Disgaea 7: Vows of the Virtueless	Additional voices		
2024	Final Fantasy VII Rebirth	Solemn Gus		
2024	Sand Land	Additional voices		
2024	Ys X: Nordics	Gunnar		
2024	A Date with Death	Grim / Casper		
2025	Fatal Fury: City of the Wolves	Kevin Rian		
2025	Date Everything!	Eddie, Volt		
2025	Demon Slayer: Kimetsu no Yaiba – The Hinokami Chronicles 2	Kokushibo		
2025	Dying Light: The Beast	Aiden Caldwell		
2026	Fire Emblem: Fortune's Weave	Solel		
2026	Final Fantasy Resonance	Jake		

== Awards ==
Year	Nominated work	Category	Award	Result	Notes	Ref.
2021	Legoshi in Beastars	Best VA Performance (EN)	Crunchyroll Anime Awards	Nominated		
