= A Polar Bear in Love =

Japanese manga series

恋するシロクマ (Koisuru Shirokuma)
- Manga
- Written by: Koromo
- Published by: Kadokawa
- English publisher: Yen Press
- Imprint: Monthly Comic Gene Series
- Magazine: Comico; Monthly Comic Gene
- Original run: December 2014 – present
- Volumes: 6
- Original video animation
- Directed by: Kazuya Ichikawa
- Written by: Kazuya Ichikawa
- Music by: Scenario Art
- Released: March 4, 2017
- Runtime: 5 mins.
- Episodes: 10

A Polar Bear in Love (Japanese: 恋するシロクマ, Hepburn: Koisuru Shirokuma) is a Japanese shōjo manga series by Koromo. A Polar Bear in Love was first launched in Comico in December 2014 before being serialized in the monthly manga magazine Monthly Comic Gene beginning in June 2015.

== Plot ==
A lost earless seal finds himself in the company of a polar bear. The polar bear falls in love with the seal, but the fearful seal constantly misinterprets his romantic advances as a strong desire to eat him.

== Characters ==
Seal (アザラシ君, Azarashi-kun)
Voiced by: Natsuki Hanae
Polar Bear (シロクマさん, Shirokuma-san)
Voiced by: Yūichirō Umehara
Cathy (キャシー, Kyashī)
Voiced by: Tetsuya Kakihara
Orca (シャチ, Shachi)
Voiced by: Ryohei Otani

== Media ==
=== Manga ===
A Polar Bear in Love is written and illustrated by Koromo. The manga was first launched on the manga app Comico in December 2014. It was later serialized in the monthly magazine Monthly Comic Gene beginning in June 2015. The chapters were later released in 4 bound volumes by Kadokawa under the Monthly Comic Gene Series imprint.

In 2017, Yen Press licensed the manga for distribution in English.

No.	Original release date	Original ISBN	English release date	English ISBN
1	January 27, 2016	978-4-04-067892-4	November 21, 2017	978-0-31-644171-1
2	August 27, 2016	978-4-04-068528-1; 978-4-04-068529-8 (LE)	February 27, 2018	978-0-31-644173-5
3	March 27, 2017	978-4-04-069091-9; 978-4-04-068914-2 (LE)	July 24, 2018	978-1-97-532622-7
4	April 27, 2018	978-4-04-069830-4; 978-4-04-069833-5 (LE)	December 11, 2018	978-1-97-532889-4
5	December 27, 2021	978-4-04-680956-8	January 17, 2023	978-1-97-532889-4

=== Anime ===
An anime adaptation was announced in December 2016 as a theatrical short. The film was written and directed by Kazuya Ichikawa, with Yō Yamada in charge of sound direction and Scenario Art providing the theme song. The film was screened on March 4, 2017.

==== Theatrical shorts ====
No.	Title	Directed by	Written by	Original release date
1	"Passing By Each Other"; Transliteration: "Surechigai" (Japanese: すれ違い)	Kazuya Ichikawa	Kazuya Ichikawa	March 4, 2017
2	"If You Eat Me"; Transliteration: "Taberu nara" (Japanese: 食べるなら)	Kazuya Ichikawa	Kazuya Ichikawa	May 13, 2017
3	"A Misunderstanding"; Transliteration: "Gokai" (Japanese: 誤解)	Kazuya Ichikawa	Kazuya Ichikawa	July 1, 2017
4	"Uneasiness"; Transliteration: "Fuan" (Japanese: 不安)	Kazuya Ichikawa	Kazuya Ichikawa	September 4, 2017

==== Web shorts ====
No.	Title	Directed by	Written by	Original release date
0	"Encounter"; Transliteration: "Deai" (Japanese: 出会い)	Kazuya Ichikawa	Kazuya Ichikawa	March 1, 2017
1	"Ice Wall Slam"; Transliteration: "Hyōhekidon" (Japanese: 氷壁ドン)	Kazuya Ichikawa	Kazuya Ichikawa	November 3, 2017
2	"The Weight of Love"; Transliteration: "Ai no Omosa" (Japanese: アイの重さ)	Kazuya Ichikawa	Kazuya Ichikawa	December 1, 2017
3	"This is Correct"; Transliteration: "Kore ga Seikai" (Japanese: これが正解)	Kazuya Ichikawa	Kazuya Ichikawa	February 1, 2018
4	"Dear Star"; Transliteration: "Ohoshi-sama" (Japanese: お星さま)	Kazuya Ichikawa	Kazuya Ichikawa	January 15, 2018
5	"Food Chain"; Transliteration: "Shokumotsu Rensa" (Japanese: 食物連鎖)	Kazuya Ichikawa	Kazuya Ichikawa	March 1, 2018
6	"Matching Outfits"; Transliteration: "Osoroi" (Japanese: お揃い)	Kazuya Ichikawa	Kazuya Ichikawa	May 4, 2018
7	"It Hurts (Part 1)"; Transliteration: "Kurushii (1)" (Japanese: 苦しい（1）)	Kazuya Ichikawa	Kazuya Ichikawa	July 6, 2018
8	"It Hurts (Part 2)"; Transliteration: "Kurushii (2)" (Japanese: 苦しい（2）)	Kazuya Ichikawa	Kazuya Ichikawa	September 7, 2018

== Reception ==
Reviewers at Anime News Network praised the artwork, but had mixed opinions about the story's more serious moments. The book came under scrutiny when parents in Orange County, California pushed to have the book banned.
