= Yūichirō Umehara =

Japanese voice actor

- 梅原 裕一郎
- Born: March 8, 1991 (age 35); Shizuoka Prefecture, Japan
- Occupation: Voice actor
- Years active: 2013–present
- Agent: Arts Vision
- Musical career
- Genre: Pop rock
- Instruments: Vocals; guitar
- Label: TuneCore
- Member of: Sir Vanity

Yūichirō Umehara (梅原 裕一郎, Umehara Yū'ichirō; born March 8, 1991) is a Japanese voice actor affiliated with Arts Vision. He is best known for his roles in Goblin Slayer as the titular protagonist, Ensemble Stars! as Keito Hasumi, Cautious Hero: The Hero Is Overpowered but Overly Cautious as Seiya Ryuuguuin, Cute High Earth Defense Club Love! as En Yufuin, Master Detective Archives: Rain Code as Vivia Twilight, Mobile Suit Gundam: Iron-Blooded Orphans as Eugene Sevenstark, Jugram Haschwalth in Bleach: Thousand-Year Blood War, The Legend of the Galactic Heroes: Die Neue These - Kaikou as Siegfried Kircheis, JoJo's Bizarre Adventure: Stone Ocean as Weather Report, Black Clover as Mars, and Mobile Suit Gundam Narrative as Zoltan Akkanen. At the 10th Seiyu Awards, he won the Best Rookie Actors Award for his roles as Kurō Hazama in Young Black Jack and Wakasa in Merman in My Tub.

Umehara is the vocalist and guitarist of pop rock band Sir Vanity, a band he formed with Yoshiki Nakajima and two other musicians.

== Personal life ==
Umehara has been married since 2016.

On May 10, 2018, it was announced that Umehara was hospitalized due to an acute disseminated encephalomyelitis. On July 30, 2018, Arts Vision announced that he had recovered. Arts Vision also stated that while Umehara was at the hospital, he had a complication of intracranial hypotension, but after medical treatment and rehabilitation, his doctors discharged him from the hospital with no worries about the effects.

== Filmography ==
=== Anime series ===
2014

- Brynhildr in the Darkness (Math teacher, man A, student, man, police officer, worker, Hekusen'yakuto man)
- Chaika - The Coffin Princess (Thug C)
- Magimoji Rurumo (Urata)
- Merman in My Tub (Wakasa)
- Riddle Story of Devil (Student of the darts shop)
- Wolf Girl and Black Prince (Student, clerk)
- Yowamushi Pedal (Audience)

2015

- Aquarion Logos (Hayato Kujō)
- Cute High Earth Defense Club Love! (En Yufuin)
- Gatchaman Crowds insight (Rhythm Suzuki)
- Makura no Danshi (Ryūshi Theodore Emori)
- Million Doll (Ryū-san)
- Mobile Suit Gundam: Iron-Blooded Orphans (Eugene Sevenstark)
- Pokémon: XY (Orunisu)
- Seraph of the End (René Simm)
- Shōnen Hollywood -Holly Stage for 50- (Friend)
- Snow White with the Red Hair (Mitsuhide Lowen)
- Young Black Jack (Kurō Hazama)

2016

- Amanchu! (Makoto Ninomiya)
- Battery (Kazuki Kaionji)
- Cute High Earth Defense Club LOVE! LOVE! (En Yufuin)
- Gate: Jieitai Kanochi nite, Kaku Tatakaeri - Enryuu-hen (Diabo)
- Girlish Number (Gojou Karasuma)
- Haruchika (College Student) (ep 10)
- Magic★Kyun! Renaissance (Teika Ichijōji)
- Snow White with the Red Hair 2nd Season (Mitsuhide Lowen)
- Tiger Mask W (Fujii Takuma)
- Trickster (Inoue Ryo)
- Masamune Datenicle (3rd Lord Yoshihiro, Yoshihiro Date)

2017

- Children of the Whales (Ouni)
- Chiruran : Nibun no Ichi (Nagakura Shinpachi)
- Classroom of the Elite (Manabu Horikita)
- Dynamic Chord (Shinobu Kurosawa)
- Ikemen Sengoku: Toki o Kakeru ga Koi wa Hajimaranai (Takeda Shingen)
- Jūni Taisen (Ushii/Eiji Kashii)
- Kabukibu! (Tonbo Murase)
- Karada Sagashi (Sugimoto Kenji)
- Kino's Journey -the Beautiful World- the Animated Series (Shizu)
- A Polar Bear in Love (Polar Bear)
- Rage of Bahamut: Virgin Soul (Charioce XVII)
- Robomasters: The Animated Series (Tei)
- Sengoku Night Blood (Masamune Date)
- Star-Myu 2 (Ren Kitahara)
- The IDOLM@STER SideM (Kyoji Takajo)
- Tsukipro The Animation (Dai Murase)
- Whistle! (ONA) (Ryoichi Tenjo)

2018

- Amanchu! Advance (Makoto Ninomiya)
- Asa Da Yo!Kaishain (Kaibura Kai)
- Black Clover (Mars)
- Caligula (Izuru Minezawa)
- Captain Tsubasa (2018) (Ken Wakashimazu)
- Dame×Prince (Vino von Ronzado)
- Darling in the Franxx (Goro)
- Gakuen Babysitters (Hayato Kamitani)
- Gintama: Shirogane no Tamashii-hen (Enshou)
- Goblin Slayer (Goblin Slayer)
- Hakyū Hōshin Engi (Igo)
- Last Hope (Jay Yoon)
- The Legend of the Galactic Heroes: Die Neue These - Kaikou (Siegfried Kircheis)
- Mobile Suit Gundam Narrative (Zoltan Akkanen)
- Planet With (Hideo Torai)
- Sword Gai The Animation (Ichijou Seiya)
- Tada Never Falls in Love (Sugimoto Hajime)
- The iDOLM@STER SideM: WakeAtte Mini! (Kyoji Takajo)
- The Thousand Musketeers (Ieyasu)
- Uchū no Hō: Reimei-hen (Alpha)

2019

- Ace of Diamond Act II (Soiichiro Mima)
- Ahiru no Sora (Shigenobu Yakuma)
- Cautious Hero: The Hero Is Overpowered but Overly Cautious (Seiya Ryuuguuin)
- Crayon Shin-chan (Ikemen)
- Ensemble Stars! (Keito Hasumi)
- Fire Force (Tōjō)
- Fragtime (OVA) (TBA)
- Kimi dake ni Motetainda (Shun Gotōda)
- Meiji Tokyo Renka (Ozaki Kouyou)
- One-Punch Man (Kuroi Sēshi)
- RobiHachi (Prince Chamechamecha)
- Stand My Heroes: Piece of Truth (Miyase Gou)
- Star-Myu 3 (Ren Kitahara)
- The Legend of the Galactic Heroes: Die Neue These - Seiran (Siegfried Kircheis)
- Tsukipro The Animation 2nd Season (Dai Murase)
- ZENONZARD The Animation (Ash Claude)

2020

- Akudama Drive (Courier)
- Ascendance of a Bookworm (Damuel, Matthias)
- Fruits Basket 2nd Season (Kureno Souma)
- Goblin Slayer: Goblin's Crown (Goblin Slayer)
- Golden Kamuy (Vasily)
- Kapibara-san (Narrator, Zookeeper)
- Plunderer (Jail Murdoch)
- Shadowverse (Kiriyama Shirou)
- Uchitama?! Have you seen my Tama? (Kuro Mikawa)
- Woodpecker Detective's Office (Sakutarō Hagiwara)
- Toilet-Bound Hanako-kun (Nene's secret crush)

2021

- 2.43: Seiin High School Boys Volleyball Team (Misao Aoki)
- Heaven's Design Team (Kimura)
- Hetalia: World Stars (Portugal)
- Hortensia Saga (Defrost Danois)
- I-Chu: Halfway Through the Idol (Lucas)
- Let's Make a Mug Too (Tomonari Kusano)
- Seven Knights Revolution: Hero Successor (Gales)
- Skate-Leading Stars (Izumi Himekawa)
- So I'm a Spider, So What? (Balto Phthalo)
- SSSS.Dynazenon (Koyomi Yamanaka)
- The Saint's Magic Power is Omnipotent (Erhart Hawke)
- The Slime Diaries: That Time I Got Reincarnated as a Slime (Zegion)
- Those Snow White Notes (Seiryū Kamiki)
- Tsukipro The Animation 2nd Season (Dai Murase)

2022

- Aoashi (Haruhisa Kuribayashi)
- Bleach: Thousand-Year Blood War (Jugram Haschwalth)
- Build Divide -#FFFFFF- Code White (Arkeld)
- Cap Kakumei Bottleman DX (Shiman Ijūin)
- Classroom of the Elite 2nd Season (Manabu Horikita)
- Echigo Bafuku (Sawatari)
- I'm the Villainess, So I'm Taming the Final Boss (Claude Jean Ellmeyer)
- Legend of Mana: The Teardrop Crystal (Elazul)
- Miss Kuroitsu from the Monster Development Department (Professor Sadamaki)
- My Master Has No Tail (Rakuda)
- Play It Cool, Guys (Takayuki Mima)
- Shoot! Goal to the Future (Atsushi Kamiya)
- Tales of Luminaria -The Fateful Crossroad- (August Wallenstein)
- Tokyo Mew Mew New (Pie)
- Golden Kamuy Season 4 (Vasily)
- I've Somehow Gotten Stronger When I Improved My Farm-Related Skills (Volpe Dorma)

2023

- A Girl & Her Guard Dog (Keiya Utō)
- Ayaka: A Story of Bonds and Wounds (Aka Ibuki)
- Bikkuri-Men (Ippontsuri)
- Demon Slayer: Kimetsu no Yaiba – Swordsmith Village Arc (Sekido)
- Goblin Slayer II (Goblin Slayer)
- High Card (Vijay Kumar Singh)
- Mashle (Abel Walker)
- My New Boss Is Goofy (Yūsei Shirosaki)
- Opus Colors (Iori Haijima)
- Revenger (Yuen Usui)
- Rurouni Kenshin (2023 TV series) (Tsukioka Tsunan)
- Spy Classroom (Klaus)
- Tearmoon Empire (Ludwig Hewitt)
- The Iceblade Sorcerer Shall Rule the World (Evi Armstrong)
- The Misfit of Demon King Academy 2nd Season (Anos Voldigoad)
- The Reincarnation of the Strongest Exorcist in Another World (Haruyoshi Kugano)
- Tokyo Mew Mew New Season 2 (Pie)
- Tsurune: The Linking Shot (Reiji Aragaki)
- Why Raeliana Ended Up at the Duke's Mansion (Noah Voltaire Wynknight)

2024

- As a Reincarnated Aristocrat, I'll Use My Appraisal Skill to Rise in the World Season 2 (Jean Tendry)
- Blue Miburo (Niimi Nishiki)
- Classroom of the Elite 3rd Season (Manabu Horikita)
- Fairy Tail: 100 Years Quest (Mercphobia)
- Mr. Villain's Day Off (Yoiyami Black)
- Nina the Starry Bride (Azure)
- Suicide Squad Isekai (The Joker)
- The Healer Who Was Banished From His Party, Is, in Fact, the Strongest (Sieg)
- Vampire Dormitory (Ren Nikaido)
- Wind Breaker (Jō Togame)

2025

- Anyway, I'm Falling in Love with You (Tōgo Hoshikawa)
- From Bureaucrat to Villainess: Dad's Been Reincarnated! (Richard Verseau)
- Mechanical Marie (Roy)
- Scooped Up by an S-Rank Adventurer! (Daggers)
- The Gorilla God's Go-To Girl (Leohart)
- The Shiunji Family Children (Arata Shiunji)

2026

- A Gentle Noble's Vacation Recommendation (Gil)
- A Tale of the Secret Saint (Saviz Nav)
- From Far Away (Rachef)
- Hana-Kimi (Minami Nanba)
- Hikuidori (Gengo Matsunaga)
- Kusunoki's Garden of Gods (Saiga Harima)
- The Ogre's Bride (Reiya Kiryuin)
- The Villainess Is Adored by the Prince of the Neighbor Kingdom (Aquasteed)
- Though I Am an Inept Villainess (Shin-u)

2027

- Otherworldly Munchkin: Let's Speedrun the Dungeon with Only 1 HP! (Sharaza)

=== Original net animation ===
- High-Rise Invasion (2021) - Sniper Mask
- JoJo's Bizarre Adventure: Stone Ocean (2021) - Weather Report
- Romantic Killer (2022) - Tsukasa Kazuki
- Disney Twisted-Wonderland the Animation (2025) - Leona Kingscholar
- Yu-Gi-Oh! Card Game The Chronicles (2026) - Diabellstar

=== Anime films ===
- Words Bubble Up Like Soda Pop (2021) - Toughboy
- My Hero Academia: World Heroes' Mission (2021) - Shidero
- Gridman Universe (2023) - Koyomi Yamanaka
- Cute High Earth Defense Club Eternal Love! (2025) - En Yufuin
- Eiga Odekake Kozame Tokai no Otomodachi (2025) - Man with a mohawk
- ChaO (2025) - Roberta

=== Video games ===
2014

- DYNAMIC CHORD feat. (reve parfait) (Shinobu Kurosawa)
- IDOL-RISM (Ichido Haruna)
- The IDOLM@STER SideM (Mobage) (Kyoji Takajo)
- Ikemen Bakumatsu - Unmei no Koi (Sakamoto Ryōma)
- Majo no Nina to Tsuchikare no Senshi
- Senjou no Wedding
- Tenku no Craft Fleet (Damien, Hauness, Reel)

2015

- Ai ★ Chū (Lucas)
- BELIEVER! (Inami You)
- Cute High Earth Defense Club Love! Game! (Yufuin En)
- Ensemble Stars! (Keito Hasumi)
- Gakuen Club ~Houkago no Himitsu~ (Kimiki Renji)
- I DOLL U (Peter)
- The IDOLM@STER SideM (Kyoji Takajo)
- Ikémen Sengoku: Romances Across Time (Takeda Shingen)
- Seraph of the End: Unmei no Hajimari (Rene Simm)

2016

- Band Yarouze! (Shin Koganei)
- DAMEXPRINCE (Vino von Ronzado)
- Do s ni Koishite ~Suiteroom de Himitsu no Shihai~ (Kokonoe Naoki)
- Icchibanketsu (Takemi Kazuchi)
- Magic★Kyun! Renaissance (Teika Ichijoji)
- Period Cube ~Torikago no Amadeus~ (Demento)
- Toraware no Palm (Haruto Kisaragi)
- The Caligula Effect (Izuru Minezawa)
- Hortensia Saga: Ao no Kishidan (Defrost)

2017

- Akane-sasu Sekai de Kimi to Utau (Ono no Imoko)
- Kingdom Hearts HD 2.8 Final Chapter Prologue (Ira)
- Hana Oboro: Sengoku-den Ranki (Hashiba Hideyoshi)
- The IDOLM@STER SideM LIVE ON ST@GE! (Kyoji Takajo)
- Sengoku Night Blood (Masamune Date)
- SENSIL (Sakuraba Shion)
- Shiro to Kuro no Alice (Rain)
- White Cat Project (Liam)
- Gakuen Club ~ Himitsu no Nightclub ~ PSVita (Kamiki Renji)
- Dear my Magicalboys (Niki Mugendo)
- Kimi to Kiri no Labyrinth (Hishikawa Hodaka)
- Grand Summoners (Vox)

2018

- Majestic ☆ Majolical (Jasper Beryl)
- Shiro to Kuro no Alice -Twilight Line- (Rain)
- Senjyushi: The Thousand Noble Musketeers (Ieyasu)
- Servant of Thrones (Phiet Crestan)
- Caligula Overdoes (Izuru Minezawa)
- Dream Collection ~Mukanshu~ (Seika)
- Dynamic Chord JAM&JOIN!!!! (Kurosawa Shinobu)
- Kannagi no Mori (Nishina Nao)
- Quiz Magical Academy (Mysterious Black Mage)
- Yoake no Bel Canto (Astoria Bragium, Aunaus Ryuusu)
- Dash! (Lucas)
- DYNAMIC CHORD feat.apple-polisher V edition (Kurosawa Shinobu)
- Dekiai voice drama × Berry's Danshi (Takabata Ibuki)
- Puzzle Cafe (Hiruma Seiki)
- Koutetsujou no Kabaneri -ran- (Chihiro)
- Tlicolity eyes (Mochizuki Yousuke)
- Ikemen Sengoku Toki o kakeru Koi -Aratanaru Deai- (Takeda Shingen)
- Alchemia Story (Shizu)
- Eternal Dungeon (Hijikata Toshizo
- Danmachi ~Memoria Friese~ (Shizu)
- Shinen Resist (Volker)
- Meiji Tokyo Renka -Haikara Date- (Ozaki Kouyou)
- Ayakashi Koi Mekuri (Gin'No Jou)
- Ordinal Strata (Reinhardt)
- Octopath Traveler (Cyrus Albright)
- Black Clover : Quartet Knight (Mars)
- Seikimatsu Days: Our Era's End (Toya Isui, Kusanagi Goshou)
- 23/7 (George A. Custer)
- World End Heroes (Raijo Shigure)
- Valkyrie Anatomia: The Origin (Goblin Slayer)
- Identity V (Luca Balsa - "Prisoner")

2019

- ZENONZARD (Ash Claude)
- BROWNDUST (Aaron)
- Dragon Marked For Death (Warrior)
- Kingdom Hearts III (Ira)
- Criminal Girls X (Male Protagonist)
- DRAGALIA LOST (Prometheus)
- The Caligula Effect: Overdose (Nintendo Switch edition) (Izuru Minezawa)
- RELEASE THE SPYCE secret fragrance (Mrs. Chocolatier)
- Grand Summoners (Goblin Slayer, (Vox)
- Tlicolity Eyes -twinkle showtime- (Mochizuki Yousuke)
- Dear My Magical Boys (Nintendo Switch edition) (Niki Mugendo)
- Libra of Precatus (Claudio)
- Graffiti Smash (Calm)
- Toraware no Palm (Nintendo Switch edition) (Haruto Kisaragi)
- Ken Ga Toki (Shakushain)
- Palette Parade (El Greco)
- Gensou Kissa Enchanté (Canus Espada)
- War of the Visions: Final Fantasy Brave Exvius (Sterne Leonis)
- Gensou Maneji (Serge)
- Sakura Wars (Xiaolong Yang)
- Gunvolt Chronicles: Luminous Avenger iX (Dystnine)
- Kaikan♥Phrase -CLIMAX- (Noah Walker)
- Kannagi no Mori Satsuki Ame Tsuzuri (Nishina Nao)
- The King of Fighters '98 (Goblin Slayer)
- Goblin Slayer -THE ENDLESS REVENGE- (Goblin Slayer)

2020

- Birushana Senki ~Genpei Hikamu Sou~ (Musashibou Benkei)
- Wind Boys (Hanashiro Seriya)
- Digimon ReArise (Hackmon)
- Ensemble Stars!! Basic/Music (Keito Hasumi)
- Disney: Twisted-Wonderland (Leona Kingscholar)
- I★Chu Étoile Stage (Lucas)
- Bleach: Brave Souls (Jugram Haschwalt)
- Jack Jeanne (Einishi Rokurou)
- Hyakka Ryouran Sengoku Star (Tenkabito)
- Miya no Kei -Palace Trick- (Emperor Bo Hokukou)
- OVERLORD: MASS FOR THE DEAD (Ryuuguuin Seiya)
- World Flipper (Educeus)
- Kingdom of Heroes Season 2 : The Broken King (Osric)
- Touken Ranbu (Ochidori Jyumonjiyari)
- Mitra Sphere (Prince)

2021

- Monster Hunter Rise (Merchant Kagero)
- Meiji Restoration Tensho Keru Koi (Ōkubo Toshimichi)
- Valkyrie Connect (Takamimusubi, Savior Dis)
- London Labyrinth (Globley)
- Octopath Traveler: Champions of the Continent (Cyrus Albright)
- Nekopara - Catboys Paradise (Sage)
- Three Kingdoms Heroes, Three Kingdoms RPG (Hua Xiong, Gan Ning, Taishi Ci)
- The IDOLM@STER SideM GROWING STARS (Kyoji Takajo)
- Deep Insanity: Asylum (Wu Innominatus)
- Fire Emblem Heroes (Raven)
- The Legend of Heroes: Trails Through Daybreak (Kasim Al-Fayed)
- My Next Life as a Villainess: All Routes Lead to Doom! ~The Pirate Who Summons Trouble~ (Albert)
- Code Geass: Genesic Re;Code (Hijikata Tochizou)
- Tarot Boys: 22 Apprentice Fortune Tellers (Ein Baphomet)
- Dragon Quest X (Hakuou)
- Ragnador: Ayashiki Koutei to Shuuen no Yashahime (Ginko)
- Pokémon Masters EX (Darach)
- Tales of Luminaria (August Wallenstein)

2022

- Birushana Senki ~Ichijuu no Kaze~ (Musashibou Benkei)
- Sentimental Photography (Saijou Mamoru)
- Radiant Tale (Paschalia)
- Shironeko Golf (Liam)
- Gran Saga (Kaito)
- Dream Meister and the Recollected Black Fairy (Kuchen)
- Shadowverse (Magna Zero)
- Soukaitenki (Reiji)
- Genshin Impact (Alhaitham)
- JoJo's Bizarre Adventure: Last Survivor (Weather Report)
- LAST CHOUDIA (Thouzer)
- Majestic☆Majolical [Nintendo Switch] (Jasper Beryl)
- Shikōtei no michi e: Shichiyū no arasoi (Lord Xinling)
- WORLD II WORLD (Col)
- Eternal Tree (Hakuro)
- ALICE Fiction (Lex)
- JoJo's Bizarre Adventure: All Star Battle R (Weather Report)

2023

- Master Detective Archives: Rain Code (Vivia Twilight)
- Radiant Tale: Fanfare! (Paschalia)
- Tower of Sky (Anker)
- Alchemy Stars (Leyn)
- DUEL MASTERS PLAY'S (Shuramaru)
- The Irregular at Magic High School: Reloaded Memory (Inoue Shou)
- Final Fantasy XVI (Sleipnir Harbard)
- Mystery Record (Shiyou)
- Final Fantasy VII: Ever Crisis (Young Sephiroth)
- Fate/Grand Order (Takeda Shingen)

2024

- Reynatis (Masayoshi Dogo)

TBA

- Goblin Slayer Another Adventurer: Nightmare Feast (Goblin Slayer)

=== Drama CD ===
2014

- Exit Tunes Present Actors2 (Kiriyama)
- GANGSTA. (Subordinate)
- Mawazaka no Kenshi to Shoukan Maou (Loki)
- Nozomubeku mo Nai (Friend A)

2015

- FlyMEproject "MEDICODE (Semimaru)
- Zenryoku Shounen Tachi no O-ut (Toa Sakuraba)

2017

- Goblin Slayer (Goblin Slayer)

2018

- Blossom (Kiritani Yamato)
- Koiiro Shihyou -Sweet Days- (Tokitsu Kaname)

2021

- High Card (Vijay Kumar Singh)

=== BLCD ===
2015

- Ai no Mitsu ni Yoe! (Dormitory Student)

=== Vomic ===
2014

- My Hero Academia (Katsuki Bakugō)

=== Stage ===
2015

- Hoshi no Koe (2015) (Terao Noboru)

2017

- Homunculus (2017) (Julius)

2018

- Eraser in My Head 11th letter (Stage Edition) (2018) (Kousuke)

2019

- Chévere Note ~Story from Jeanne d'Arc~ (2019) (Étienne de Vignolles)

2020

- EL GALLEON (2020) (William Dampier)
- THANATOS (2020) (Dr. Edmund Earhart)
- VOICARION (Noguchi Tamon)

=== Film ===
2020

- Seiyuu Danshi Desu Ga...? (Himself)

=== CM ===
2015

- MAMESHIBA GAKUEN (Midori Edao)

=== Dubbing ===
==== Live-action ====
- Digger (Kenny)
- DMZ (Skel)
- A Dog's Purpose (Teenage Ethan Montgomery)
- Goosebumps (Zach Cooper)
- School of Rock (Freddie) (Episodes 1 and 2, episode 12 onwards)
- Spiral (Detective William Schenk)
- Unforgotten (Tyler Da Silva)
- Valley of the Boom (Marc Andreessen)

==== Animation ====
- Bravest Warriors (Daniel "Danny" Vasquez)
- Love, Death & Robots (Sale man) (Episode 12)
- Miraculous Ladybug (Luka Couffaine)

=== Other ===
2025

- Umarekawattara Suki na Hito ni Kawareru Neko ni Naritai (Chiharu, Murooka)
