= Papyless =

Japanese e-book distribution company

Papyless Co., Ltd
- Native name: 株式会社パピレス
- Type: Kabushiki gaisha
- Industry: Publication
- Genre: E-book
- Founded: March 31, 1995; 31 years ago
- Founder: Mikio Amaya
- Number of locations: 2
- Key people: Yasuko Matsui (CEO)
- Revenue: ¥414.46 million
- Website: www.papy.co.jp

Papyless Co. Ltd. (株式会社パピレス, Kabushiki-gaisha Papiresu), formerly known as Fuji Online Systems (フジオンラインシステム) from 1995 to 2000, is a Japanese e-book distribution company first established on March 31, 1995. Papyless is the parent company of Renta!, a digital manga online rental service.

== History ==
Papyless was first established as Fuji Online Systems, Co. Ltd on March 31, 1995 and was launched online in December 1996. By October 2000, the company was renamed to Papyless Co. Ltd.

== Subsidiaries ==
=== Renta! ===
Papyless launched Renta!, an online manga rental service, on April 10, 2007. An English version of the website, with English translated comics, was launched in September 2011, with a global location set up in San Francisco, California on May 1, 2017. A Chinese version of the website was launched in July 2013. By March 17, 2020, over 6 million users were registered on the website.

A variety television series titled Comic Bar Renta!, hosted by voice actor Shuta Morishima, was broadcast on Tokyo MX beginning in January 2017. Beginning in January 2019, the show was also broadcast on BS Fuji. The series, lasting 3 minutes and 45 seconds per episode, features Morishima as a bartender recommending manga to a guest voice actor, and the two re-enact a scene of their choice.

On June 26, 2018, Papyless announced that Renta! was publishing their original manga under the imprint Renta Comics, with their first published title being Kimi ni Ai o! by Noll Shikishima, the winner of the Renta! TateComi Prize.
