= Tomohisa Taguchi =

Japanese anime director

- 田口智久
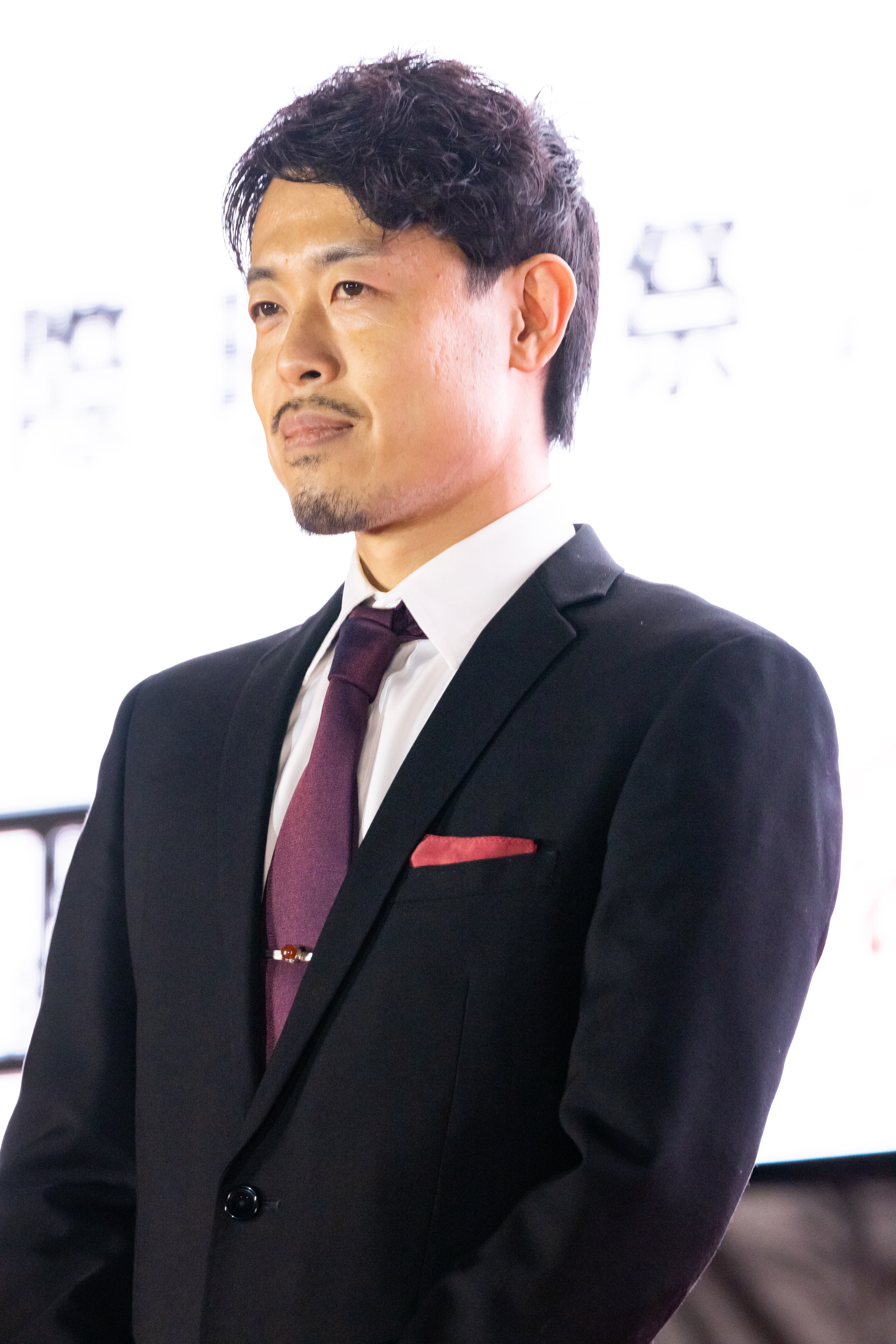
- Taguchi in 2022
- Born: Sōja, Okayama, Japan
- Education: Osaka Seikei University
- Occupations: Animator, director, storyboard artist, screenwriter
- Years active: 2007–present

Tomohisa Taguchi (Japanese: 田口智久, Hepburn: Taguchi Tomohisa) is a Japanese animator, director, storyboard artist and screenwriter.

== Personal life ==
Taguchi was born and raised in Sōja. He graduated from Osaka Seikei University Faculty of Arts in 2007 and worked as a production assistant at Anime International Company. While attending college, he wanted to make live-action films. Although he is still interested in making one, he feels that animation has its own merits and charms, and there are many things that can only be expressed in animation. For this reason, he would like to focus on creating works that make good use of the expressions that are only possible in animation.

== Career ==
In 2014, under A-1 Pictures, Taguchi made his directorial debut with Persona 3 The Movie: No. 2, Midsummer Knight's Dream. He worked on various Persona anime before. Taguchi shared that it was a tough job for him because it was his first directorial work and he was also directing Persona 4: The Golden Animation at the same time. After the film was released, he received an offer from Aniplex producer, Kazuki Adachi, to direct another Persona film, Persona 3 The Movie: No. 4, Winter of Rebirth. On December 19, 2015, during Jump Festa 2016, it was announced that Taguchi is the director for Twin Star Exorcist TV anime adaptation. The series was produced on a tight schedule. At AnimeJapan 2017, Taguchi, who rushed to the event in the middle of final work, said that when he finished storyboarding the final episode (while stating that the work was still ongoing), he felt a deep emotion that he had never felt before in any other work.

On July 9, 2017, the 56th volume of Dengeki Bunko Magazine revealed that Taguchi is directing the new Kino's Journey TV anime at Lerche. In the interview, Taguchi said that the anime uses different color palette and art production company for each episode. The reason for this was because he wanted to express the feeling that each country was completely different from the others to the audience. On September 11, 2018, it was announced that Taguchi is the director for new original anime project by Pierrot producer, Yoshihiro Tominaga, and his college friend, Too Kyo Games CEO, Kazutaka Kodaka, which two years later was revealed to be called Akudama Drive. Tominaga personally chose him to direct the project because he got the impression that Taguchi is particularly good at directing action scenes and designing the screens when he had the opportunity to work with him before. Taguchi said he has been approached by Tominaga since around 2017. Tominaga told him about wanting to do a Tarantino-like crime suspense anime with a cyberpunk setting. It was a project he hadn't seen much in animation, so he thought it would be interesting. On July 6, 2019, "Future of Digimon" panel at Anime Expo 2019 revealed that Taguchi is directing Digimon's 20th anniversary film, Digimon Adventure: Last Evolution Kizuna. Taguchi was appointed as the director of the film by Toei producer, Yosuke Kinoshita, since before the production of the sixth Digimon Adventure tri. film has been finished. The ideas that formed the basis of the film storyline were solidified with his participation.

In 2021, Akudama Drive, an original anime series he co-wrote and directed won Top Anime at the 7th Anime Trending Awards. On August 1, 2021, at DigiFes 2021, it was announced that Taguchi will be directing another Digimon film. On December 18, 2021, during Jump Festa 2022, it was announced that Taguchi is directing and writing the anime adaptation of the last twenty volumes of Bleach, under supervision of Tite Kubo. On April 27, 2022, the anime film adaptation for The Tunnel to Summer, the Exit of Goodbyes, released its first trailer. The trailer reveals that Taguchi will be writing the script for the film along with directing it as previously announced.

== Works ==
=== Anime series ===
- Persona 4: The Golden Animation (2014) – Director
- Twin Star Exorcists (2016–2017) – Director
- Kino's Journey: The Beautiful World - The Animated Series (2017) – Director
- Akudama Drive (2020) – Director and series composition
- Bleach: Thousand Year Blood War (2022–2026) – Director and series composition

=== Anime films ===
- Persona 3 The Movie: No. 2, Midsummer Knight's Dream (2014) – Director
- Persona 3 The Movie: No. 4, Winter of Rebirth (2016) – Director
- Digimon Adventure: Last Evolution Kizuna (2020) – Director
- The Tunnel to Summer, the Exit of Goodbyes (2022) – Director and screenplay
- Digimon Adventure 02: The Beginning (2023) – Director
