= List of Cute High Earth Defense Club Love! episodes =

Cute High Earth Defense Club Love! is an anime television series by Diomedéa, directed by Shinji Takamatsu and written by Michiko Yokote. The series is a parody of the magical girl genre, in which five male students are chosen to become the magical Battle Lovers in order to protect the Earth from evil monsters. The series aired in Japan between January 6, 2015, and March 24, 2015, and was simulcast by Crunchyroll and Funimation. The series was licensed in North America by Ponycan USA, who began releasing the series on Blu-ray Disc and DVD in August 2015.

The opening theme is "Zettai Muteki☆Fallin'LOVE☆" (絶対無敵☆Fallin'LOVE☆, Absolutely Invincible Fallin' Love) by the Earth Defense Club (Kazutomi Yamamoto, Yuichiro Umehara, Kōtarō Nishiyama, Yūsuke Shirai, and Toshiki Masuda), while the ending theme is "I Miss You no 3 Metre" (I miss you の3メートル, Three Metres of I Miss You) by the Conquest Club (Hiroshi Kamiya, Jun Fukuyama, Takuma Terashima).

A second season, title Cute High Earth Defense Club Love! Love!, began airing in Japan from July 7, 2016, to September 27, 2016. The opening theme for Season two is "Futten Toppa☆LOVE IS POWER☆" (沸点突破☆ LOVE IS POWER ☆, Past the Boiling Point☆LOVE IS POWER☆) by the Earth Defense Club (Kazutomi Yamamoto, Yuichiro Umehara, Kōtarō Nishiyama, Yūsuke Shirai, and Toshiki Masuda), the ending theme is "Anata wa Haruka Ittousei" (あなたは遥か一等星, You're a distant star of the first magnitude) by the Vepper / Beppu brothers Keisuke Koumoto and Yoshiki Murakami.

== Episode list ==
=== Cute High Earth Defense Club Love! (2015) ===
No.	Title	Original air date
1	"In the Name of Love"; Transliteration: "Ai to Iuna no Moto ni" (Japanese: 愛という名のもとに)	January 6, 2015
At Binan High School, the members of the Earth Defense Club, also known as the "do-nothing club", enjoy their leisurely high school lives. But their normal high school life suddenly changes when a talking pink Wombat appears out of nowhere and recruits the boys to help save the Earth with the power of love and become magical warriors known as Battle Lovers.
2	"Love Means Never Feeling Regret"; Transliteration: "Ai towa Keshite Kōkaishinai Soto" (Japanese: 愛とはけして後悔しないこと)	January 13, 2015
While the Earth Defense Club meets to try and understand their new role as superheroes, the Binan High Student Council convenes to discuss the appearance of this mysterious group of Battle Lovers who have interfered with their plans of conquering the Earth as the Earth Conquest Club, Caerula Adamas.
3	"Feel the Love, Narcissus!"; Transliteration: "Aiseyo, Narushisu!" (Japanese: 愛せよ、ナルシス！)	January 20, 2015
Binan High's traditional pretty boy contest is drawing near. The members of the Earth Defense Club, not showing much interest in the event, mess around in the club in their free time. But when a rival in the student council, Akoya, tries to oppose Ryuu, the club decides to hold a strategy meeting to propel the Earth Defense Club's "#1 Hustler" to victory. Meanwhile, the ballet club advisor's fruitless struggles to take the #1 pretty boy slot catch the eye of the Conquest Club. The day of the contest arrives, and the winner is about to be announced, when suddenly...
4	"Cute Little Boys of Love and Youth"; Transliteration: "Ai to Seishun no Bishōnen" (Japanese: 愛と青春の美少年)	January 27, 2015
When they were kids, Atsushi and Kinshiro made wishes on a shooting star. One night in the student council room, Kinshiro thinks back on that day, and renews his oath of world domination. Meanwhile, the Earth Defense Club is holding one of its usual meetings in Kurotama Bath, discussing what it means to be young. The next day, all the students at Binan High are suddenly transformed into children, and the Battle Lovers are forced to fight a new enemy even though they're child sized.
5	"To Steal Love Without Regret"; Transliteration: "Ai wa Oshiminaku Ubau" (Japanese: 愛は惜しみなく奪う)	February 3, 2015
The Binan High Press Society has become interested in the recent events involving the Battle Lovers happening around the school, and have pursued the Earth Defense Club much to the dismay of the club members. Can the Defense Club keep their identities a secret?
6	"Love is Something You Wear on Your Back"; Transliteration: "Ai wa Senaka de Katarumono" (Japanese: 愛は背中で語るもの)	February 10, 2015
The Earth Defense Club is in danger of being disbanded if any of the members can't pass their exams. And in an attempt to forcefully disband the Defense Club, the Student Council offers Io a position as student council treasurer.
7	"Love, Training Camp and Toothbrushes"; Transliteration: "Ai to Gasshuku to Haburashi" (Japanese: 愛と合宿と歯ブラシ)	February 17, 2015
The Defense Club goes on a training camp at the beach. When Io discovers that someone among their group used his toothbrush, everyone starts to become suspicious of each other. Meanwhile, The Conquest Club is also on vacation at a luxury private resort.
8	"Love Wanders!"; Transliteration: "Ai wa Samayō" (Japanese: 愛は彷徨う)	February 24, 2015
A new monster appears that has the power to cause friends to fight. When En is put under the monster's influence, he and Atsushi immediately have a huge argument and a tension grows between them. Can the Battle Lovers defeat this new enemy and save En and Atsushi's friendship?
9	"Love is Stronger than Pride"; Transliteration: "Ai wa Puraido Yori Tsuyoi" (Japanese: 愛はプライドより強い)	March 3, 2015
After having their monsters beaten one after another, the Conquest Club attempts a new strategy for fighting the Battle Lovers by setting a trap for them on Mt. Binan. Although the Defense Club is suspicious of the trap, they don't have enough money to make the trip. The Press Society overhears their dilemma and offers to help fund the Defense Club if they participate in a photoshoot.
10	"Love is Glasses"; Transliteration: "Ai Sore wa Megane" (Japanese: 愛それはメガネ)	March 10, 2015
Yumoto catches a cold for the first time in his life. After resting for a day at home, he returns to school the next day; however his character has completely changed. He changes into a refreshing glasses character similar to his classmate, Rui Megawa, causing Rui to become jealous of Yumoto's new popularity among the upperclassmen.
11	"The Trial Called Love"; Transliteration: "Ai to Iuna no Shiren" (Japanese: 愛という名の試練)	March 17, 2015
Binan High is preparing for their Culture Festival. Since the class or club that win the popularity vote receives a cash prize, the Defense Club will participate as well. They decided to serve Atsushi's curry and transform into their Battle Lover costumes to sell "Cosplay Hero Curry". On the day of the Culture Festival, when Kinshiro follows the smell of curry that's drifting into the student council room, he finds Atsushi transformed as Epinard in the Defense Club room, learning his secret identity. Being fueled by spiteful memories, Kinshiro transforms into Aurite, and the fated battle between the Battle Lovers and Caerula Adamas begins.
12	"Love Forever"; Transliteration: "Ai yo Eien ni" (Japanese: 愛よ永遠に)	March 24, 2015
The goldfish Hireashi reveals that all the events surrounding the Battle Lovers and Caerula Adamas had actually been a reality show that was being broadcast throughout the universe.

=== Cute High Earth Defense Club Love! Love! (2016) ===
No.	Title	Original air date
1 (13)	"Love, Once More!"; Transliteration: "Ai, Futatabi!" (Japanese: 愛、ふたたび！)	July 7, 2016
As the Earth Defense Club plan to see the Student Council off as they go to study abroad, an hourglass monster appears and destroys their Loveracelets. When the monster appears the next day, Wombat returns and gives the boys new Loveracelets, allowing them to transform into the Battle Lovers once more and defeat the monster with just enough time to see the student council off. Meanwhile, a sinister pair of twins decide to transfer into Binan High School.
2 (14)	"Love is a Mayfly"; Transliteration: "Ai wa Kagerō" (Japanese: 愛はカゲロウ)	July 14, 2016
Two twins, Haruhiko and Akihiko Beppu, transfers into Binan High School, attracting the attention of overweight, beauty-obsessed student Tsukuna Ouso. After charming most of the school, the twins, also known as Galaxy Vepper, transform Osou into a Tofu Monster, which is soon defeated by the Battle Lovers.
3 (15)	"Brotherly Love"; Transliteration: "Aisuru Burazāzu" (Japanese: 愛するブラザーズ)	July 21, 2016
With the Student Council studying abroad, the Defense Club is asked to present a reading to children. Tagaru Katari, a member of the Speaking Poets Society, is upset at this development as he thinks that only someone with passion can do this job. Thanks to a suggestion from Yumoto, the group decides to do the story "Jizo and the Hats" for the children. But when Vepper transforms Katari into the Mic Monster, it's up to the Battle Lovers to keep the children safe and save the play.
4 (16)	"The Synchronicity of Love"; Transliteration: "Ai no shinkuronishitī" (Japanese: 愛のシンクロニシティー)	July 28, 2016
Continuously annoyed by Yumoto's brotherly connection to Gora, Haruhiko and Akihiko try to come up with a new plan to destroy the Battle Lovers. Meanwhile, Bernardo, the older of the Italian twins that also recently transferred to Binan, tries to figure out if his brother really hates him as the two have had a rocky relationship recently. Taking advantage of this development, the Beppu twins transform Bernard's brother Alan into the Chest Hair Monster. Thanks to the Battle Lovers, the monster is defeat and Alan and Bernard finally work out their differences.
5 (17)	"Receive Love"; Transliteration: "Ai o uketomero!" (Japanese: 愛を受け止めろ!)	August 4, 2016
Fed up with Munakata's practicing in the Volleyball club, Shuzo Oka quits. But as Munakata finds a new club ally in Yumoto, Shuzo becomes jealous and is transformed into the Volleyball Monster. When he finally sees the truth, Shuzo and Munakata vow to not graduate until they finally participate in a Volleyball tournament. Meanwhile, we see a little more of a connection between the Beppu twins and a certain former Battle Lover.
6 (18)	"Everyone Loves Someone!"; Transliteration: "Min'na dare ka o" (Japanese: みんな誰かを)	August 11, 2016
To the rest of the Defense Club's disappointment, Io and Ryuu got themselves into a little fight. Yumoto, En, and Atsushi excuse themselves to Kurotama while Wombat is left to help Io and Ryuu reconcile, though with no results. The flashbacks show how Io and Ryuu met, showing us they couldn't stand each other at first, and how they decided to join the Defense Club. Kuroshiro Kumano approaches the Beppu twins on how to become an idol, as he would like to become like them.
7 (19)	"A Christmas of Love and Miracles"; Transliteration: "Ai to kiseki no kurisumasu" (Japanese: 愛と奇跡のクリスマス)	August 18, 2016
Christmas is a magical time that makes people go a little crazy. On the day of Christmas Eve, Yufuin makes the shockingly uncharacteristic suggestion that they hold a Christmas party. Gora joins the Christmas party at Kurotama Bath, and even more unexpected visitors show up, throwing the party into chaos! A one-night-only miracle of love and confusion begins!
8 (20)	"Love is Like the Snow"; Transliteration: "Ai wa yuki no yō ni" (Japanese: 愛は雪のように)	August 25, 2016
It's New Year's Eve, and the Defense Club members are gathered at the Kurotama Bath, fighting over the TV and cozying up at the kotatsu with their usual leisurely air. Although they expected to go their separate ways after eating Gora's home-made soba, the area directly around the Kurotama Bath is suddenly hit by a blizzard, which cuts them off from the outside world! How will the club react to this disaster situation?!
9 (21)	"The Chemical Substance of Love"; Transliteration: "Ai no kagaku busshitsu" (Japanese: 愛の化学物質)	September 1, 2016
The Beppu Brothers declare outright to the Defense Club that they're the ones who have been sending the monsters, but the Defense Club members just brush them off, spending their days in their usual slow pace while ignoring the brothers for two whole months. The Beppu Brothers, enraged over this slight, choose February 14th as the day they will have their revenge. And so the Valentine's Day grudge match begins!
10 (22)	"Days of Love and Acclaim"; Transliteration: "Ai to kassai no hibi" (Japanese: 愛と喝采の日々)	September 8, 2016
The always-energetic Yumoto is sighing, which takes the other Defense Club members aback! It seems an old amusement park he used to go to, Binan Land, is closing. The other Defense Club members aren't too surprised, saying "it was a pretty sad place" and "Every couple that's gone there has broken up", but Yumoto is truly despondent at the thought of losing a place he used to go to with his big brother. The others can't stand to watch him looking so down, so they pool their money to give Yumoto one last trip to Binan Land.
11 (23)	"Love is What Matters"; Transliteration: "Aisureba koso" (Japanese: 愛すればこそ)	September 15, 2016
The wood chopping-obsessed Gora has gone missing, leaving wood unchopped! Yumoto and his "senpais" search fervently for Gora, but can't find a single clue as to his whereabouts. A dejected Defense Club returns to the bath to relax, where they receive an unexpected visitor...
12 (24)	"Love Will Save the Earth"; Transliteration: "Ai wa chikyū o sukuu!" (Japanese: 愛は地球を救う！)	September 27, 2016
The Defense Club has decided to fight to save Gora, and VEPPer will try to keep him at any cost. How will this heated battle end? Will love save the Earth?!

=== Cute High Earth Defense Club HAPPY KISS! (2018) ===
No.	Title	Original release date
1 (25)	"The Suddenness of HAPPY! KISS"; Transliteration: "Happy! Kiss wa Totsuzen ni" (Japanese: HAPPY! KISSは突然に)	April 8, 2018
2 (26)	"HAPPY Recipe"; Transliteration: "Happy no recipe" (Japanese: HAPPYのレシピ)	April 15, 2018
3 (27)	"HAPPY Ice Cream"; Transliteration: "HAPPY aisu kurīmu" (Japanese: HAPPYアイスクリーム)	April 22, 2018
4 (28)	"It's A Wonderful HAPPY"; Transliteration: "Subarashiki kana HAPPY" (Japanese: 素晴らしきかな HAPPY)	April 29, 2018
5 (29)	"HAPPY and Beautiful"; Transliteration: "HAPPY ni utsukushiku" (Japanese: HAPPY に美しく)	May 6, 2018
6 (30)	"HAPPY Identity"; Transliteration: "HAPPY aidentitī" (Japanese: HAPPY アイデンティティー)	May 13, 2018
7 (31)	"Let's happy kiss our way to HAPPY Flutter Kicks"; Transliteration: "Bataashi HAPPY" (Japanese: バタアシ HAPPY)	May 20, 2018
8 (32)	"HAPPY Endless Summer"; Transliteration: "HAPPY endoresu samā" (Japanese: HAPPY エンドレスサマー)	May 27, 2018
9 (33)	"HAPPY Dice"; Transliteration: "HAPPY daisu" (Japanese: HAPPY ダイス)	June 3, 2018
10 (34)	"HAPPY Old Men"; Transliteration: "HAPPY ōrudo men" (Japanese: HAPPY オールドメン)	June 17, 2018
11 (35)	"One Centimeter to HAPPY"; Transliteration: "Ato 1 centi no HAPPY" (Japanese: あと 1 センチの HAPPY)	June 24, 2018
12 (36)	"Always HAPPY in the Heart!"; Transliteration: "Itsumo kokoro ni HAPPY wo" (Japanese: いつも心にHAPPYを)	July 1, 2018
