= Cute High Earth Defense Club Eternal Love! =

2025 film by Shinji Takamatsu

- Kanji: 美男高校地球防衛部ETERNAL LOVE！
- Revised Hepburn: Binan Kōkō Chikyū Bōei-bu Etānaru Rabu!
- Directed by: Shinji Takamatsu
- Screenplay by: Michiko Yokote
- Based on: Cute High Earth Defense Club Love! by Kurari Umatani
- Starring: Kazutomi Yamamoto; Yūichirō Umehara; Kōtarō Nishiyama; Yusuke Shirai; Toshiki Masuda
- Cinematography: Kenji Takehara
- Edited by: Toshihiko Kojima
- Music by: yamazo
- Production company: Studio Comet
- Distributed by: Pony Canyon Inc.
- Release date: January 24, 2025
- Running time: 81 minutes
- Country: Japan
- Language: Japanese

Cute High Earth Defense Club Eternal Love! (Note: Japanese: 美男高校地球防衛部ETERNAL LOVE！, Hepburn: Binan Kōkō Chikyū Bōei-bu Etānaru Rabu!; lit. "Beautiful Man High School Defense Club Eternal Love!") is a 2025 Japanese animated fantasy parody film directed by Shinji Takamatsu and written by Michiko Yokote; the film is based on the Cute High Earth Defense Club Love! franchise by Kurari Umatani. Produced by Studio Comet and distributed by Pony Canyon, Eternal Love! celebrates the franchise's 10th anniversary, and serve as a sequel to the first anime series. The film stars the voices of Kazutomi Yamamoto, Yūichirō Umehara, Kōtarō Nishiyama, Yusuke Shirai, and Toshiki Masuda. Eternal Love! was released in Japan on January 24, 2025.

== Synopsis ==
To save Earth and love itself, Wombat aims to travel to year 2015, but then accidentally lands on the year 2025. The Battle Lovers must reunite and face cold-hearted Deathamor.

== Voice cast ==
Earth Defense Club

- Kazutomi Yamamoto as Yumoto Hakone
- Yūichirō Umehara as En Yufuin
- Kōtarō Nishiyama as Atsushi Kinugawa
- Yusuke Shirai as Io Naruko
- Toshiki Masuda as Ryuu Zaruo
- Tomokazu Sugita as Gōra Hakone
- Mugihito as Wombat

Conquest Club

- Hiroshi Kamiya as Kinishiro Kusatsu
- Jun Fukuyama as Ibushu Arima
- Takuma Terashima as Akoya Gero
- Hiroki Yasumoto as Zundar

Vepper

- Keisuke Koumoto as Akihiko Beppu
- Yoshiki Murakami as Haruhiko Beppu
- Hiroki Yasumoto as Danacha

Defense Club Happy Kiss

- Naoyuki Shimozuru as Kyotaro Shuzeji
- Ryōga Komata as Ryoma Kirishima
- Takahide Ishii as Nanao Wakura
- Rikuya Yasuda as Taishi Manza
- Shouta Hayama as Ichiro Dōgo
- Takuya Eguchi as Karurusu

Student Council Edelstein

- Hikaru Midorikawa as Ata Ibusuki
- Kosuke Toriumi as Taiju Unazuki
- Yoshitsugu Matsuoka as Maasa Shirohine
- Hiroki Yasumoto as Rafunui

Film characters

- Kappei Yamaguchi as Aye-aye
- Jūrōta Kosugi as Deathamor

== Production ==
In July 2024, it was announced that the Cute High Earth Defense Club Love! franchise will receive a film adaptation to commemorate its tenth anniversary, along with the returning voice cast and staff members. In October 2024, it was announced that the voice cast members of Cute High Earth Defense Club Happy Kiss! would also reprise their roles for the film. In November of that year, it was announced that Kappei Yamaguchi and Jūrōta Kosugi have been cast as new characters.

The theme song for the film is "Forever Unchanging☆LOVE IS LIFE☆" (永久不変☆LOVE IS LIFE☆, Eikyū Fuhen☆Rabu is Raifu☆) by Cute High Earth All Stars.

== Release ==
The film was released in theaters in Japan on January 24, 2025.

== Reception ==
=== Box office ===
The film did not reach the top 10 in the Japanese box office in its opening weekend.
