= Kaz Harada =

Kaz Harada may refer to:

- Kazuo Harada (died 1998), Japanese anime producer, audio director, and sound effects director who worked for Studio Comet
- Kimikazu Harada, chairman of Sony Music Entertainment Japan and Sony Music Artists Inc.
- Kaz Harada, a fictional character based on the latter person in the American-Japanese animated fantasy-comedy television series Hi Hi Puffy AmiYumi
