= Sora no Manimani =

Japanese manga series

- First tankōbon volume cover, featuring (from left to right) Masashi Edogawa, Hime Makita, Takeyasu Roma, Sayo Yarai, Mihoshi Akeno, and Saku Ōyagi

宙のまにまに
- Genre: Romantic comedy
- Manga
- Written by: Mami Kashiwabara
- Published by: Kodansha
- Imprint: Afternoon KC
- Magazine: Monthly Afternoon
- Original run: September 24, 2005 – July 25, 2011
- Volumes: 10
- Anime television series
- Directed by: Shinji Takamatsu
- Written by: Shinji Takamatsu
- Music by: CooRie; Kaoru Okubo
- Studio: Studio Comet
- Original network: AT-X
- Original run: July 7, 2009 – September 22, 2009
- Episodes: 12
- icon

Sora no Manimani (Japanese: 宙のまにまに; lit. 'At the Mercy of the Sky') is a Japanese manga series written and illustrated by Mami Kashiwabara. It was serialized in Kodansha's seinen manga magazine Monthly Afternoon from September 2005 to July 2011, with its chapters collected in 10 tankōbon volumes. A 12-episode anime adaptation by Studio Comet and directed by Shinji Takamatsu aired in Japan between July and September 2009.

== Plot ==
Sora no Manimani revolves around Saku Ōyagi, a bookworm who moves back to the town he lived in as a child after seven years. He had a childhood friend named Mihoshi Akeno who loved astronomy and would always take Saku outside against his will to look at the stars, or do other outdoor activities, whereas Saku would rather have stayed inside with his books. Saku broke his arm the day he moved away after trying to catch Mihoshi falling out of a tree; Saku resented her for this, and that she never saw him off. However, this was a misunderstanding since he was too stubborn to listen to the whole story (the fall had put her in the hospital so she could not see him off), and later becomes friends with Mihoshi again after they meet attending the same high school. Mihoshi convinces Saku to join the astronomy club she is a member of, despite Saku actually wanting to join literature club instead. Hime Makita, a girl in Saku's class who has a crush on him, also joins the astronomy club.

== Characters ==
Saku Ōyagi (大八木 朔, Ōyagi Saku)
Voiced by: Tomoaki Maeno, Saori Hayami (child)
Saku is the main protagonist for this story, who grew up traveling around Japan due to his father constantly changing jobs. Saku loves to read books and can often be seen reading, whether it be on the bus, at school, or at home. He generally likes to stay indoors and read, but after joining the astronomy club, he starts to enjoy going out and stargazing or participating in other club activities. As Fumie notes, his writing skills are top notch, making him better suited for the literature club. While he is constantly annoyed by Mihoshi, he does enjoy her company. However, because of how Mihoshi shows up to his class a lot, many of his classmates believe that they are dating (much to the dismay of Hime and Saku).
Mihoshi Akeno (明野 美星, Akeno Mihoshi)
Voiced by: Kanae Itō
Mihoshi is a cheerful girl who is a childhood friend of Saku's though she is one year older than him and has a tendency to act childish. She is very enthusiastic about and has a strong love for all things astronomy, an interest she learned about from her late father. She has always enjoyed going outside and stargazing or doing other activities, and would usually drag Saku along with her, often against his will. She is thrilled to be reunited with Saku and convinces him to join the astronomy club at their school. She becomes the club president after Roma graduates.
Sayo Yarai (矢来 小夜, Yarai Sayo)
Voiced by: Saori Hayami
Sayo is a calm and intelligent girl who is in the same year as Mihoshi and is also a member of the astronomy club. Her family runs a Buddhist temple.
Hime Makita (蒔田 姫, Makita Hime)
Voiced by: Haruka Tomatsu
Hime is a girl who is in the same class as Saku, whom she has a crush on. After Saku joins the astronomy club, she quickly follows suit so as to spend more time closer to him and getting to know him. She had originally met Saku briefly on the bus before taking their entrance exam for the school, and was surprised to see him again in her class. She is generally a calm girl though is known to get jealous of Mihoshi when she is sticking close to Saku. Though she has a crush on Saku, she is easily put off by other guys trying to make advances on her. Hime's hair gets frizzy in high-humidity weather, and her sister can use this trait to gauge the humidity in the air.
Masashi Edogawa (江戸川 正志, Edogawa Masashi)
Voiced by: Reiko Takagi
Masashi Edogawa is one of Saku's classmates and friend, and while he often takes part in astronomy club activities, is actually a member of the photography club. He enjoys hanging around the astronomy club because of Mihoshi, Sayo and Hime, whom he sees as all very attractive, and is jealous that Saku is surrounded by beautiful girls. However, he also enjoys astronomy and actively participates in stargazing events. His photography skills tend to come in handy in promoting the astronomy club.
Takeyasu Roma (路万 健康, Roma Takeyasu)
Voiced by: Junji Majima
Takeyasu Roma is the president of the astronomy club. He has always had a poor constitution and as such is generally very weak and often spits up blood or passes out after doing something straining. He has an intense love of astronomy, akin to Mihoshi's own enthusiasm. After graduating, he goes to college with Ayumi Ōmi, a girl with the same passion for astronomy as him, and who has a crush on him.
Fumie Kotozuka (琴塚 文江, Kotozuka Fumie)
Voiced by: Ami Koshimizu
Fumie is the student council president and also a member of the literature club, where she often takes charge of club events despite not being the club president. She notices how Saku also enjoys books and reading and has invited him to join the literature club on multiple occasions. She admires Saku's writing skills and develops an interest in him. She feels that the astronomy club and its members are not what a club should be and is generally not favorable about their activities. She has known Mihoshi for several years and feels animosity towards her. She has terrible eyesight and has trouble distinguishing objects and people without her glasses on.

== Media ==
=== Manga ===
Written and illustrated by Mami Kashiwabara, Sora no Manimani began serialization in Kodansha's seinen manga magazine Monthly Afternoon on September 24, 2005. (Note: Debuted in the magazine's November 2005 issue, released on September 24, 2005.) The final chapter was released on June 25, 2011, with a bonus chapter released the following month on July 25. Kodansha collected its chapters in 10 tankōbon volumes, released from June 23, 2006, to September 23, 2011.

==== Volumes ====
No.	Release date	ISBN
1	June 23, 2006	978-4-06-314417-8
2	December 22, 2006	978-4-06-314439-0
3	July 23, 2007	978-4-06-314461-1
4	March 21, 2008	978-4-06-314495-6
5	September 22, 2008	978-4-06-314528-1
6	April 23, 2009	978-4-06-314560-1
7	November 20, 2009	978-4-06-310607-7
8	July 23, 2010	978-4-06-310679-4
9	March 23, 2011	978-4-06-310737-1
10	September 23, 2011	978-4-06-310777-7

=== Anime ===
A 12-episode anime adaptation animated by Studio Comet and directed by Shinji Takamatsu aired in Japan between July 7 and September 22, 2009. The opening theme is "Super Noisy Nova" by Sphere, and the ending theme is "Hoshikuzu no Surround" (星屑のサラウンド, Hoshikuzu no Saraundo) by CooRie.
