= Fairy Ranmaru =

2021 anime television series

- Key visual of Fairy Ranmaru

Fairy蘭丸～あなたの心お助けします～ (Fearī Ranmaru: Anata no Kokoro Otasuke Shimasu)
- Genre: Magical boy
- Created by: Taiga Umatani
- Anime television series
- Directed by: Masakazu Hishida; Kōsuke Kobayashi (Note: Series director (シリーズディレクター).)
- Produced by: Yōka Kawahara; Masayo Kudō; Hajime Maruyama; Ayaka Sugiura; Shōta Watase; Yukari Iso
- Written by: Masakazu Hishida (Note: Credited under the pseudonym Jō Aoba (青葉譲).)
- Music by: Yamazo
- Studio: Studio Comet
- Licensed by: Crunchyroll
- Original network: AT-X, Tokyo MX
- Original run: April 8, 2021 – June 24, 2021
- Episodes: 12

Fairy Ranmaru (Japanese: Fairy蘭丸～あなたの心お助けします～, Hepburn: Fairy Ranmaru: Anata no Kokoro Otasuke Shimasu; lit. "Fairy Ranmaru: We'll Save Your Heart") is an original Japanese anime television series animated by Studio Comet, which aired from April 8 to June 24, 2021.

== Synopsis ==
Five young fairies from various clans are chosen by the Fairy Queen and given the mission to heal the afflicted hearts of people and collect the so-called "Attachments", the main resource of their kingdom. In the human world, the group poses as high school students while they work in the mysterious "Bar F". They do not accept any payment, the only price being the heart of their customers.

== Characters ==
=== Main characters ===
Ranmaru Ai (阿以 蘭丸, Ai Ranmaru)
Voiced by: Shogo Sakata
Ranmaru is the Fairy of Illumination and is from the Lux Clan. An honest and kind boy, Ranmaru is totally dedicated to his mission of heal the afflicted hearts of people. Likewise, he shows a great disposition to help others, acting numerous times as a mediator between his companions. He suffers from amnesia and his past is a mystery.
Homura Hoterase (歩照瀬 焔, Hoterase Homura)
Voiced by: Kōsuke Tanabe
Homura is the Fairy of Flames and is from the Ignis Clan. Although hot-tempered, Homura is passionate and caring; however, he tends to clash with Uruu due to the rivalry between the Ignis and Aqua Clans. From a young age, Homura struggles over the death of his father, who was executed.
Uruu Seiren (清怜 うるう, Seiren Uruu)
Voiced by: Yutaka Balletta
Uruu is the Fairy of Luster and is from the Aqua Clan. As the Aqua Clan is in charge of political affairs in the fairy world, he has a strict sense of morality and is the most serious in the group. From a young age, he was neglected by his parents and his mother committed suicide after having an extramarital affair with a member from the Ignis Clan, causing him to despise Homura. Uruu eventually discovers that Homura's father was his mother's lover, and he struggles to balance both his hatred for Homura as well as his attraction towards him.
Jyuka Mutsuoka (陸岡 樹果, Matsuoka Juka)
Voiced by: Taichi Kusano
Jyuka is the Fairy of Verdure and is from the Arbor Clan. The youngest of the group, Jyuka has a childish appearance, however, he doesn't like to be considered as someone cute, preferring instead to be seen as someone cool. His main power is healing.
Takara Utashiro (雅楽代 寶, Utashiro Takara)
Voiced by: Akihiro Hori
Takara is the Fairy of Gold and is from the Metallum Clan. He is the caretaker of the other fairies and works as a bartender at Bar F. He is the true heir of the Metallum Clan, but, as a child, he and his mother fled from the fairy world after a power struggle started in his clan. After his mother died from starvation, Takara worked as a child prostitute. He is the only fairy in the group who does not abide by the Ten Laws, and he maintains a connection with an ex-fairy lawyer.

=== Supporting characters ===
Sirius Tenrōin (天狼院 シリウス, Tenrōin Shiriusu)
Voiced by: Tetsuei Sumiya
A mysterious young man whose main objective is to destroy the world of fairies and humans alike. He harbors a strong hate for the Fairy Queen and wishes to see her dead. He also seems to have some kind of connection with Ranmaru's dark past. Later, it's revealed that he is a fallen fairy.
Hōjō Omamori (御守 豊穣, Omamori Hōjō)
Voiced by: Junpei Morita
Hōjō is the Fairy of Loam and is from the Earth Clan. He is the loyal assistant of the Fairy Queen. He is a fairy from the Earth Clan and usually takes the appearance of a human.
Queen (女王, Joō)
Voiced by: Shiori Mikami
The queen of the fairy world gives the boys the mission of collect attachments in order to rebuild her kingdom. However, her true intentions remain hidden. Her real name is Procyon (プロキオン, Purokion).
Bakkun (バックン)
Voiced by: Kazutomi Yamamoto
A small baku that accompanies the group to Earth and is usually seen with them.

== Production and release ==
On January 8, 2021, the anime original television series was announced through Twitter. The series is animated by Studio Comet and directed by Masakazu Hishida, with Kōsuke Kobayashi as series director, Hishida as scriptwriter under the pseudonym Jō Aoba, and Yamazo composing the series' music. It aired from April 8 to June 24, 2021, on AT-X, Tokyo MX, and BS NTV. Crunchyroll licensed the series outside of South-east Asia. The voice actors for the five main characters performed the opening theme song Ayashiku Get your heart (妖しく Get your heart, Bewitching Get your heart) and the ending theme song Yōsei Aika (夭聖哀歌, Fairy Lament) under the group name 5 to Heaven.

== Episode list ==
No.	Title	Directed by	Original release date
1	"Romance"; Transliteration: "Ren'ai" (Japanese: 恋愛)	Kōsuke Kobayashi	April 8, 2021
The queen sends representatives of each of the five clans to pose as humans and collect "attachments" by healing the hearts of people. On the first day of school at Et Fran de Muse Academy, Ranmaru notices his classmate, Eiko, being cyberbullied by Mimi, another classmate, over jealousy that her ex-boyfriend Ichirō has fallen in love with her. Ranmaru saves Eiko from a suicide attempt and takes her heart, transporting into a world based on Pablo Picasso's artwork. After locating Mimi's heart, he defeats her and gathers the attachment. Though Eiko has lost her memories of Ranmaru, the next day, she confirms she and Ichirō are dating, while Mimi becomes cyberbullied by her other classmates.
2	"Wrath"; Transliteration: "Fundo" (Japanese: 憤怒)	Ryōhei Horiuchi	April 15, 2021
Homura recalls that his father's execution in the past and reluctantly establishes a connection with Shiina Hayasaki, a manga artist who is bullied by her editor. Shiina decides to make her new series about fairies and requests Homura to be the model for her protagonist. However, her editor refuses to publish her story and plagiarizes it, replacing her protagonist with a cute female character. Homura ascends to a world based on moe manga and, powered by Shiina's wrath, defeats the editor. Much later, Shiina's manga series, Homura the Fairy, has become a hit, while her editor is fired.
3	"Envy"; Transliteration: "Shitto" (Japanese: 嫉妬)	Kazuya Fujishiro	April 22, 2021
Uruu establishes a connection with Iyo Hokari, a woman dating a 2.5D musical actor named Soji Henmi. Despite Iyo supporting his career, Soji treats her coldly, leading her to post photos of herself wearing his clothing on social media. When Iyo catches Soji cheating on her with another fan, Uruu ascends to a world based on Thirty-six Views of Mount Fuji and The Dream of the Fisherman's Wife and defeats Soji. However, as Iyo has been corrupted over getting revenge, Uruu attacks her as well and is punished as a result. In the end, Iyo has moved on with her life, while Soji comes out as gay.
4	"Degeneracy"; Transliteration: "Daraku" (Japanese: 堕落)	Kōsuke Kobayashi	April 29, 2021
Jyuka establishes a connection with Kei Riju, a member of the idol girl group Aurora Vikings, after he stops a thief from stealing her costume. To Jyuka's dismay, Kei requests him to teach her how to be cute, as she is not as popular as L Nuikawa, who currently occupies the group's center position. Despite her hard work, Kei remains unpopular, but she learns that L is earning her popularity through fraternizing with fans. Jyuka ascends to a world based on Wheat Fields, Sunflowers, and The Starry Night, where L temporarily blinds him. After Ranmaru saves him, Jyuka locates L through her voice and defeats her. Afterwards, Jyuka attends Aurora Vikings' concert, where Kei has now become the center of the group; however, she is repeating L's methods to become popular.
5	"Lust"; Transliteration: "Shikiyoku" (Japanese: 色欲)	Hisaya Takamura	May 6, 2021
Takara, the sole heir to the Metallum Clan and the only fairy not abiding by the Ten Laws, establishes a connection with Ruise, whose injured father owns a grocery shop and is currently in debt. Ruise's malnourished condition reminds Takara of how he and his mother used to survive while escaping from his clan's power struggle, and he hires her at Bar F. Ruise is forced to quit after being harassed by her debt collector, but her debt collector propositions her to become a mail-order bride to a wealthy man willing to pay off all her expenses. Takara ascends to a world based on Guernica and overpowers the beast, defeating the debt collector. As a result, Takara's lawyer accomplice helps Ruise and her father get back their money.
6	"Liberation"; Transliteration: "Kaihō" (Japanese: 解放)	Ryōhei Horiuchi	May 13, 2021
The fairies learn from each other that they are their heirs to their respective clans and begin to suspect the queen is hiding something. Meanwhile, Ranmaru helps out Chika, a saleswoman employed under a pyramid scheme designated to sell eel supplements and bullied by her boss. When the boss refuses to let visit her dying grandmother, Chika attempts suicide, but she is saved by Ranmaru. Ranmaru ascends to a world based on monochrome art, where her boss forces him to surrender by feigning remorse. Despite Sirius appearing and taunting him, Ranmaru is able to defeat Chika's boss. In the end, Chika is unable to see her grandmother before she dies but makes peace with her death. Takara reports to the queen about Sirius' return, and she demands that he be killed.
7	"Pride"; Transliteration: "Gōman" (Japanese: 傲慢)	Seo Hye-jin	May 20, 2021
Homura the Fairy is getting an anime adaptation, and despite Shiina losing memories of him, Homura re-establishes a connection when she requests him to become the model for her protagonist again. When Shiina's jealous assistant, Ogi Wakamura, falsely claims that Shiina had plagiarized one of her old manga series, Homura becomes determined to help, while Uruu confronts him over falling in love with her. Homura ascends to a world based on Kiyoshi Yamashita's paintings, where cannons attempt to destroy the creatures inhabiting the area. He protects Shiina from Ogi and defeats her. However, Chilka subdues him with a near-fatal attack, and, as Homura falls into the lake, Uruu rescues and kisses him.
8	"Violence"; Transliteration: "Bōryoku" (Japanese: 暴力)	Toshiaki Kanbara	May 27, 2021
Jyuka again feels inferior about his roles with the Arbor Clan as well as his desire to be seen as "cool" instead of "cute." He establishes a connection with Aru, a kindergarten teacher, who is overworked by the principal and asks for his help. While the principal refuses to help and spends her time at host clubs, Aru falls ill while managing the class' potato garden project. Jyuka ascends to a world based on the Thirty-six Views of Mount Fuji and is attacked by a man-eating plant. Ranmaru subdues Chilka before he can attack Jyuka, and when Jyuka is eaten by the plant, his healing abilities allow him to self-regenerate and defeat the principal. In the end, the principal is fired, and Jyuka acknowledges his healing abilities as strengths. Meanwhile, Uruu oversees Homura's recovery and confirms that his mother had an affair with Homura's father.
9	"Apathy"; Transliteration: "Reitan" (Japanese: 冷淡)	Hisaya Takamura	June 3, 2021
As Uruu recalls his mother's suicide, he establishes a connection with Birika Kanda, a high school art student who suspects her mother is cheating on her father, a famous politician. When Birika learns that her mother's lover does not return her feelings and begins making advances on her, Uruu ascends to a world based on Water Lilies. He sees a projection of his mother and Homura's father's affair, with his mother protecting Homura's father from his attacks and forcing him to experience the heat she felt from Homura's father. Homura saves and frees Uruu, allowing him defeat the lover. Afterwards, Uruu learns that Birika's mother committed suicide after learning her lover's feelings about her. Having realized the truth behind his mother's suicide, Uruu tells Homura that he realized his mother did not regret her affair.
10	"Hedonism"; Transliteration: "Kairaku" (Japanese: 快楽)	Shōtarō Kitamura (Note: As the pseudonym An Ōkawara (大川原杏).)	June 10, 2021
While searching for Sirius on orders from the queen, Takara meets Tina Soejima, a pole dancer earning a living for her infant son while her deadbeat boyfriend spends her earnings on gambling, which reminds him of his past as a prostitute. When Tina's boyfriend attempts to force her into prostitution, Takara ascends to a world based on the Wind God and Thunder God, of which the Wind and Thunder Gods attack him with tobacco fumes and alcohol. Takara resists the attacks, and he is assaulted by a projection of his mother. The rest of the fairies come to his rescue, and he defeats Tina's boyfriend. In the end, Tina joins the Cirque du Mars while Takara discovers that Chilka and Ranmaru used to be in an idol duo called the Winter Tri-Angels, with the queen as their producer.
11	"Hatred"; Transliteration: "Zōo" (Japanese: 憎悪)	Kōsuke Kobayashi; Kyōhei Suzuki	June 17, 2021
While Ranmaru searches for Chilka, who has begun corrupting souls en masse to lure out the queen, Hojo arrives at Bar F. Chilka and Hojo share the past respectively: years ago, the queen, whose real name is Procyon, had come down to the human world with Chilka and Ranmaru, who were known as Sirius and Betelgeuse. Sirius and Betelgeuse had gathered a large amount of attachment by performing as the idol duo Winter Tri-Angels, which helped the fairy world grow rapidly. However, the amount of attachment was unable to sustain the fairy world, causing power struggles within the Ignis, Aqua, and Metallum Clans; in addition, Sirius decided to leave the fairy world to be with a human woman with whom he had fallen in love. When the woman rejects him and dies, Sirius believed Procyon plotted her death and attempted to destroy the fairy world. In present time, Hojo requests the fairies to help him remove the seal on Procyon's heart. Meanwhile, Chilka steals Ranmaru's heart to locate Procyon, while Hojo comes to her defense.
12	"Love"; Transliteration: "Ai" (Japanese: 愛)	Kōsuke Kobayashi; Kyōhei Suzuki	June 24, 2021
As Ranmaru recovers, an injured Hojo entrusts his pocket watch to him. The fairies find Procyon in the fairy world, but she flies into a rage when Chilka reveals that Ranmaru was the one who destroyed the fairy world after attempting suicide over being forced to fight him. Procyon transforms into a demonic form and the fairies attempt to unlock her heart with Hojo's pocket watch, but she distracts Homura by revealing that his father's execution was related to Uruu's mother's suicide. While the fairies are separated, Uruu reveals the truth behind his mother's suicide to Homura and kisses him. Afterwards, the fairies meet the ghosts of their parents, who entrust them the responsibility of their clans. Meanwhile, Ranmaru reveals to Chilka that he met his ex-girlfriend's soul, who told him she returned his feelings but rejected him because she had a terminal illness. The other fairies return, including Hojo, and they unlock Procyon's heart, returning her to her true form. Procyon apologizes to the fairies, and everyone, except for Chilka, agrees to help her rebuild the fairy world. The fairy world is revived, and after Chilka returns to the human world, he is given a letter from his ex-girlfriend, and Ranmaru confesses his love for him.
