= Shogo Sakata =

Japanese voice actor

- 坂田 将吾
- Born: 23 January 1998 (age 28); Kumamoto Prefecture, Japan
- Occupation: Voice actor
- Years active: 2017–present
- Agent: Aoni Production
- Notable work: Tsugumomo as Akito Ashimine; Fairy Ranmaru as Ranmaru Ai; Chainsaw Man as Aki Hayakawa; The Magical Revolution of the Reincarnated Princess and the Genius Young Lady as Algard von Palletia; The Wrong Way to Use Healing Magic as Usato; Blue Archive as Sensei; Steel Ball Run: JoJo's Bizarre Adventure as Johnny Joestar

Shogo Sakata (坂田 将吾, Sakata Shōgo; born 23 January 1998) is a Japanese voice actor from Kumamoto Prefecture. He is known for voicing Akito Ashimine in Tsugumomo, Ranmaru Ai in Fairy Ranmaru, Aki Hayakawa in Chainsaw Man, Johnny Joestar in Steel Ball Run: JoJo's Bizarre Adventure, Algard von Palletia in The Magical Revolution of the Reincarnated Princess and the Genius Young Lady, Usato in The Wrong Way to Use Healing Magic, and Sensei in Blue Archive.

== Biography ==
Sakata, a native of Kumamoto Prefecture, was born on 23 January 1998. As a junior high school student, he read a light novel and wanted to be the main character, inspiring him to become a voice actor. After graduating from high school, he was educated at the Amusement Media Academy, during which he appeared in the film Jinrō Game: Mad Land and worked on the Japanese-language dub of the 2017 film Loving Vincent.

In April 2019, Sakata voiced Jun Komine as part of Sanrio's Warahibi multimedia project. In December 2019, he voiced Akito Ashimine in Tsugumomo. In January 2021, he voiced Ranmaru Ai in Fairy Ranmaru. In July 2021, he voiced Leviathan in My Hero Academia: World Heroes' Mission. In August 2022, he voiced Aki Hayakawa in Chainsaw Man. In October 2022, he voiced Algard von Palletia in The Magical Revolution of the Reincarnated Princess and the Genius Young Lady. In January 2023, he voiced Takuya Yanagida in MF Ghost. In July 2023, he voiced Usato in The Wrong Way to Use Healing Magic. In November 2023, he voiced Marse in Tales of Wedding Rings. In December 2023, he voiced Jun Shirosaki in Love Is Indivisible by Twins and Taku Yazaki in My Instant Death Ability Is So Overpowered. In 2025, he voiced Saito Hōjō in I Got Married to the Girl I Hate Most in Class.

== Filmography ==
=== Animated television ===
2018

- Chibi Maruko-chan, Yōsuke

2020

- Fire Force, Karin Sasaki
- Is It Wrong to Try to Pick Up Girls in a Dungeon?, Modaka
- Tsugumomo, Akito Ashimine

2021

- Fairy Ranmaru, Ranmaru Ai
- Full Dive, Takafumi
- Pokémon, Inteleon
- Shaman King, Midori Tamurazaki
- So I'm a Spider, So What?, Kenichi Ogiwara
- That Time I Got Reincarnated as a Slime, Nansou

2022

- Chainsaw Man, Aki Hayakawa

2023

- The Magical Revolution of the Reincarnated Princess and the Genius Young Lady, Algard von Palletia
- MF Ghost, Takuya Yanagida

2024

- Blue Archive the Animation, Sensei
- Blue Box, Ryōsuke Nishida
- Love Is Indivisible by Twins, Jun Shirosaki
- My Instant Death Ability Is So Overpowered, Taku Yazaki
- Ron Kamonohashi's Forbidden Deductions 2nd Season, Shunsuke Sakai
- Tales of Wedding Rings, Marse
- The Most Notorious "Talker" Runs the World's Greatest Clan, Leon Frederic
- The Unwanted Undead Adventurer, Ryuntus
- The Wrong Way to Use Healing Magic, Usato
- Wind Breaker, Masaki Anzai

2025

- Chitose Is in the Ramune Bottle, Saku Chitose
- I Got Married to the Girl I Hate Most in Class, Saito Hōjō
- My Awkward Senpai, Yū Kamegawa
- Possibly the Greatest Alchemist of All Time, Takumi Iruma
- Secrets of the Silent Witch, Felix Arc Ridill
- The Brilliant Healer's New Life in the Shadows, Zenos
- Tougen Anki, Ikari Yaoroshi
- Wind Breaker Season 2, Masaki Anzai

2026

- Agents of the Four Seasons: Dance of Spring, Rōsei Kantsubaki
- Classroom of the Elite, Riku Utomiya
- Even the Student Council Has Its Holes!, Ume Mizunoe
- Even Though I'm a Super Timid Noble Girl, I Accepted the Bet from My Cunning Fiancé, Phillip
- Kusunoki's Garden of Gods, Minato Kusunoki
- Thunder 3, Doku
- You and I Are Polar Opposites, Tani

=== Animated film ===
- My Hero Academia: World Heroes' Mission (2021), Leviathan
- Chainsaw Man – The Movie: Reze Arc (2025), Aki Hayakawa

=== Original net animation ===
2019

- The Disastrous Life of Saiki K.: Reawakened, Kaito

2026

- Steel Ball Run: JoJo's Bizarre Adventure, Johnny Joestar
- Love Through a Prism, Peter Anthony

=== Video games ===
2018

- God Eater 3, Soul

2020

- Crash Fever, Lancelot
- Koi no Hanasaku Hyakkaen, Shion Miyazawa
- Lost Ark, Hudong

2021

- Akuma Shitsuji to Kuroi Neko, Fennesz Oswald
- Bravely Default II, Prince Pollux
- Caligula2, Kaoru Uno
- Samurai Warriors 5, Saitō Toshimitsu

2024

- Honkai: Star Rail, Moze
- Mobile Legends:Bang Bang, Suyou
- 18TRIP, Nagi Hachinoya

2025

- ToHeart, Hiroyuki Fujita
- Black Beacon, Ji Xia
