= RobiHachi =

Japanese anime television series

- Official art
- Created by: Taiga Umatani
- Anime television series
- Directed by: Shinji Takamatsu
- Written by: Hiroko Kanasugi
- Studio: Studio Comet
- Licensed by: Funimation
- Original network: AT-X, BS11, Tokyo MX, MBS
- Original run: April 8, 2019 – June 24, 2019
- Episodes: 12

RobiHachi is a 12-episode Japanese anime television series produced by Studio Comet. The series aired from April 8 to June 24, 2019. The storyline is futurist but alludes to the story of Tōkaidōchū Hizakurige. The comically silly and purposely lame Hizakuriger robot (named after the Tōkaidō story) makes its appearance, a reimagining of the "long forgotten" 1970s era robot anime Chōgattai Majutsu Robo Ginguiser.

== Plot ==
In Neo Tokyo in the year Galaxy Century (G.C.) 0051, humans have known of aliens for the last 50 years and obtained super light-speed navigation technology and formed a commonwealth of planets. Self-proclaimed freelance reportage writer Robby Yarge fails at work, so his contract is cut. His girlfriend leaves him, he nearly dies in a traffic accident, and debt collectors are after him. One day, a bag snatcher steals Robby's bag, and a young man helps him. Hatchi Kita, an 18-year-old part-time worker, catches the criminal and returns Robby's bag. However, Hatchi turns up again in Robby's life as a debt collector. Hatchi explains that it's his part-time job working for the loan shark Yang. A cat-and-mouse chase begins, and Yang takes his subordinates Allo and Gras along for the ride.

== Characters ==
Robby Yarge (ロビー・ヤージ, Robī Yāji)
Voiced by: Kazuya Nakai (Japanese); Cris George (English)
Robby is a man in his thirties and a self-proclaimed freelance reporter. He has a weakness for beautiful woman and lucrative money. After being scammed by a get-rich-quick scheme, he has a string a bad luck, leading him to be chased down by Yang.
Hatchi Kita (ハッチ・キタ)
Voiced by: Keisuke Koumoto (Japanese); Stephen Fu (English)
Hatchi is an eighteen-year-old boy skilled in academics and martial arts. He is a part-time debt collector working for Yang. Although he was assigned to collect from Robby, things took an unpredictable turn when he joins Robby on a journey to Isekandar.
JPS-19 (イック, Ikku)
Voiced by: Daisuke Sakaguchi (Japanese); Anthony Bowling (English)
JPS-19 is Robby's house support robot, and is commonly referred known as "Iku". Shown as a wisecracking robot rabbit, he has a sassy attitude and often ridicules Robby.
Yang (ヤン, Yan)
Voiced by: Tomokazu Sugita (Japanese); Ian Sinclair (English)
Yang is a loan shark and the president of Yang's Finance. He has a unique sense of beauty of fashion. After lending Robby some money, Yang started having an intense obsession with Robby, to the point of chasing him around the universe. His favorite food is milky strawberry candy.
Allo (アロ, Aro)
Voiced by: Subaru Kimura (Japanese); Christopher Wehkamp (English)
Allo is one of Yang's subordinates and an employee of Yang's Finance. His blonde pompadour hair is his charm point.
Gras (グラ, Gura)
Voiced by: Shinnosuke Tokudome (Japanese); Alison Viktorin (English)
Gras is one of Yang's subordinates and an employee of Yang's Finance. His pink afro hair is his charm point.

== Production ==
An original anime was announced by Studio Comet on November 19, 2018. The 12-episode series is directed by Shinji Takamatsu, with Hiroko Kanasugi handling series composition and Yuuko Yahiro designing the characters. It aired from April 8 to June 24, 2019, on AbemaTV and AT-X.

No.	Title	Original release date
1	"Traveling Companions; Journey to the Star"; Transliteration: "Tabi wa Michidure Journey to the Star" (Japanese: 旅は道連れ Journey to the Star)	April 8, 2019
In Neo Tokyo in the year Galaxy Century (G.C.) 0051, Robby Yarge is introduced as a self-proclaimed freelance reporter with a weakness for beautiful women and lucrative money. He loses his contract at work, is dumped by his girlfriend and nearly dies from a traffic accident. One day, Robby decides to offer fast food to an orderly eighteen-year-old vegan named Hatchi Kita as a token of appreciation for catching a thief who attempted to snatch Robby's money bag. At night in a bar, Robby sees an advertisement for Isekandar, rumored to be a planet that has the power to make dreams come true. Robby comes home drunk to his house support robot JPS-19. The next morning, Hatchi shows up at Robby's penthouse, where it is revealed that Hatchi is actually a part-time debt collector working for a loan shark named Yang, whose subordinates are named Allo and Gras. Robby traps Hatchi in an airlock just as Yang, Allo and Gras prepare to destroy the penthouse. In a bidding move, Robby escapes with JPS-19 in the penthouse, which converts into an old spaceship called the Nagaya Voyager. Unfortunately, Hatchi joins them for the intergalactic travel to Isekandar. Aboard a giant shachihoko spaceship, Yang, Allo and Gras try to capture the Nagaya Voyager with a tractor beam. After accessing a secret storage unit, Robby and Hatchi pilot two space fighters, which then merge into a samurai mecha named Hizakuriger.
2	"Truth Found From an Octopus"; Transliteration: "Tako Kara Deta Makoto" (Japanese: タコから出た真実(まこと))	April 15, 2019
After Robby and Hatchi flash a beam of light from Hizakuriger, they retreat as JPS-19 pilots the Nagaya Voyager at warp speed, though it eventually runs out of fuel. They make a pit stop and have the Nagaya Voyager serviced on Mars, where all the Martians are anthropomorphic octopuses. Robby and Hatchi enjoy some spicy takoyaki in the shopping district. Yang, Allo and Gras travel towards Haccone, a planet famously known for its hot springs. Robby and Hatchi visit a bar, where Hatchi is soon confined in jail after secretly discovering that the Martians are actually humans wearing octopus costumes. Hatchi learns that Mars was once an inhabitable desert that later became a tourist destination due to a misunderstanding with octopuses. Robby finds out the secret from a woman, whose father named Chu Chu Takakowaina is the head of the Mars Tourism Bureau. Hatchi is roped into being featured in an advertisement for an unpopular amusement park called Takotubo Land, but Robby and Chu Chu's daughter try to convince Chu Chu to expose the truth about the Martians. Since Hatchi paid for the Nagaya Voyager to be serviced, he ultimately joins Robby and JPS-19 on their trip to Isekandar. Yang, Allo and Gras decide to postpone their visit to Haccone upon realizing that Robby and Hatchi were on Mars after a news article reveals that the Martians are not anthropomorphic octopuses. Hatchi later tells Robby that Hizakuriger was featured in a short-lived fifty-year-old sci-fi anime series called "Galaxy Traveler Hizakuriger".
3	"Pique on Planet Pluto"; Transliteration: "Meiōsei no Hoshi Urami" (Japanese: 冥王星の惑星(ほし)恨み)	April 22, 2019
When the warp drive of the Nagaya Voyager gets damaged, Robby, Hatchi and JPS-19 are forced to land on the snowy tundra planet of Pluto, where they are greeted by the chief of the Pluto Travel Bureau and his daughter initially wearing mascot costumes called Mr. Pluto and Ms. Denshi, sponsored by an advertising agency. Outraged that Pluto has been demoted as a planetoid, the chief and his daughter are campaigning to change "Monday" to "Plutoday" and promote their signature shaved ice. Since Mars has improved tourism due to Robby and Hatchi's influence, the chief and his daughter recruit Robby and Hatchi to do the same with Pluto. After Hatchi realizes that an icefield in Pluto called the Tombaugh Regio is shaped like a heart, Robby has the brilliant idea of branding Pluto as the planet of love. Meanwhile, Yang, Allo and Gras arrive on Mars, where Chu Chu informs them that Robby and Hatchi are headed to Isekandar. The acting manager Kodai and Morisugi, employees from the advertising agency Dontsu Incorporated, deliver a full-size Mr. Pluto mecha to the chief as a bargaining tactic, but Robby points out that Mr. Pluto was featured on a trading card that was popular twenty years ago. When Kodai and Morisugi operate Mr. Pluto in retaliation, they are defeated by Robby and Hatchi using Hizakuriger. After the warp drive of the Nagaya Voyager is repaired, Robby, Hatchi and JPS-19 then travel out of the Solar System.
4	"Merfolk on the End of the Pole"; Transliteration: "Sao no Sakini Hangyojin" (Japanese: 竿の先に半魚人)	April 29, 2019
Yang recalls that he received a bag of milky strawberry candy after he gave a loan to Robby. After believing they are being followed by three spaceships, Robby, Hatchi and JPS-19 visit the water planet Odwarla, one of the 53 stage station planets. They find a shopping district that resembles a giant fish loaf, where the residents of Odwarla are merfolk. At a seafood bowl restaurant, Robby and Hatchi try a seafood bowl of freshly caught fish. Robby is admitted to the hospital for food poisoning supposedly from the Plutonian shaved ice, though he reunites with a pretty nurse whom he previously met back on Earth. Meanwhile, Hatchi and JPS-19 work as dishwashers alongside an engaged merman named Gyo-Gyo at the seafood bowl restaurant in order to pay off the debt from the meal. Being tipped off by the pretty nurse, Robby later informs Hatchi and JPS-19 that reward money will be granted for catching an elusive oarfish. When they are unable to catch the oarfish even with Gyo-Gyo's help, Robby and Hatchi use Hizakuriger to dive into the ocean, though Hizakuriger starts to sink. Robby and Hatchi manage to make it out of the escape hatch, and Gyo-Gyo carries them to shore. Although Robby, Hatchi and JPS-19 catch the oarfish that spouted out of Hizakuriger, they use the reward money to haul Hizakuriger out of the ocean and pay for Gyo-Gyo's wedding.
5	"The Don Opens All Doors"; Transliteration: "Jigoku no Sada Mo Don Shidai." (Japanese: 地獄の沙汰もドン次第)	May 6, 2019
While on the planet Tottska, where racing is everything, Yang, Allo and Gras learn that Robby, Hatchi and JPS-19 caught the oarfish in Odwarla. Robby, Hatchi and JPS-19 arrive at Haccone Gateway, the first Galaxy Highway checkpoint. Since they do not have the required transit permits, they decide to visit one of the ten hot springs in Haccone, where the residents are kappa. Hatchi overhears that travel permits can be acquired from a local underworld boss. The bartender serves peach hot spring coffee with peach hot springs sticky buns for Hatchi to enjoy. Robby hangs out with three female tourists at the hot spring, while Hatchi and JPS-19 collect information regarding the underworld boss. However, the three female tourists choose to ride with Hatchi on a pirate ship, much to Robby's chagrin. A ticket booth attendant named Kapako, who is also the bartender's daughter, mentions to Robby that the ten hot springs were built by her benefactor. After figuring out that the underworld boss is Kapako's benefactor, Hatchi asks Kapako if there is a way to obtain the transit permits. Kapako advises Robby, Hatchi and JPS-19 not to look directly at the underworld boss. They meet the underworld boss, who just so happens to be an adorable wombat. After acquiring the transit permits, Robby, Hatchi and JPS-19 are shocked upon learning that the transit permits are not required for traveling to Isekandar.
6	"Qu-eel-le Surprise"; Transliteration: "Ne Mimi ni Unagi" (Japanese: 根耳にウナギ)	May 13, 2019
Robby, Hatchi and JPS-19 make their way towards Hamama II, the 29th planet on the Galaxy Highway, where the residents are tribesmen. Hamama II is a kingdom that is famous for its delicious eel. Robby, Hatchi and JPS-19 make it just in time for the Great Eel Festival, where the eels are enormous. They meet Unami, a child who offers to be their tour guide. Unami informs Robby, Hatchi and JPS-19 that prize money is awarded in events taking place in an arena. Yang, Allo and Gras also arrive on Hamama II, hoping to find Robby, Hatchi and JPS-19. Ironically, Yang has a close encounter with Robby during a parade. Robby, Hatchi and JPS-19 stay at a hotel and enjoy the amenities, unaware that Yang, Allo and Gras are looking for them. At night, Robby is fast asleep, while Hatchi and JPS-19 hear Yang groaning outside their hotel bedroom, but Yang suddenly leaves after bursting a blood vessel. When Hatchi and JPS-19 step outside, they see the splattered blood on the floor, prompting Hatchi to believe that it was a ghost. The next day, Unami brings Robby, Hatchi and JPS-19 to the arena, where Yang, Allo and Gras finally find them. As Yang urges Robby to pay back his loan, they eventually participate in an eel racing event, where Yang wins first place and Robby wins second place. Before taking their leave, Robby, Hatchi and JPS-19 learn that Unami is biologically male despite having a female appearance.
7	"Land of Dreams Just Ahead"; Transliteration: "Issunsaki wa Yume no Kuni" (Japanese: 一寸先は夢の国)	May 20, 2019
Robby, Hatchi and JPS-19 reach Akka Sakka, the 36th planet on the Galaxy Highway, believed to be the planet of love and hope. Thanks to Hatchi acquiring more than 10,000 followers on social media, Robby, Hatchi and JPS-19 are able to use the rear entrance and skip the long lines into the main entrance. They soon find out that the residents are dressed in flower fairy costumes while breaking into song. Moreover, Hatchi informs Robby and JPS-19 that complaining of any kind is against the law on Akka Sakka. While visiting an amusement park, Hatchi has the time of his life, while Robby and JPS-19 suffer in agony. Meanwhile, Yang, Allo and Gras arrive on Akka Sakka. While refilling his caramel box, Hatchi is escorted to the missing children's center. Robby is then paged by the intercom to retrieve Hatchi. As a parade commences, Robby, Hatchi and JPS-19 are caught off guard when they see Yang, Allo and Gras standing on a float. Yang chases Robby and Hatchi towards the castle. When the phenomenon called the Lovely Star Night occurs, in which nearby planetoids form a rare heart-shaped eclipse, Robby and Hatchi accidentally ring the bell at the top of the stairway, mistakenly being chosen as the love king and queen. JPS-19 brings Robby and Hatchi aboard the Nagaya Voyager as they make their escape, while Yang still yearns for his dream to come true.
8	"Heads I'm Tin, Tails You Lose"; Transliteration: "Mekaru ga Kachi" (Japanese: メカるが勝ち)	May 27, 2019
Robby, Hatchi and JPS-19 approach Mulberry VII, the 42nd planet on the Galaxy Highway, which is apparently known for its grilled clam. However, they realize that they have landed on Mulberry VIII, where its residents are giant mecha who recreationally fight while the humans are regarded as slaves. Robby and Hatchi pilot Hizakuriger in order to blend in with society. As Yang, Allo and Gras later arrive on Mulberry VIII, Yang builds a miniature mecha in his likeness, sparking interest in a royal figure called the Mecha Count, who agrees to help Yang search for Robby. On Mulberry VII, Robby, Hatchi and JPS-19 find a seaside grilled clam shop, where they help the shop owner named Hoshiro by harvesting some clams using Hizakuriger. After Robby, Hatchi and JPS-19 are halted by the pharaoh mecha Prince Chamechamecha, they are then recruited by the mustached mecha King Chamechamecha to participate in a mock battle against the Mecha Count outside the palace on Mulberry VIII. During the foggy morning, King Chamechamecha's forces fight against the Mecha Count's forces. Inside their respective mecha, Robby, Hatchi and JPS-19 end up dueling Yang. Surprisingly, things take a turn when Hoshiro leads a revolution with the humans by using tanks and missiles against King Chamechamecha and the Mecha Count, which allows Robby, Hatchi and JPS-19 to escape aboard the Nagaya Voyager. Yang, Allo and Gras then join Hoshiro in the revolution.
9	"The Family That Sticks Together, Hizakuriger"; Transliteration: "Teishu no Sukina Hizakurigā" (Japanese: 亭主の好きなヒザクリガー)	June 3, 2019
The mark of the new era called the Galaxy Century began fifty years ago, when the first Japanese astronaut landed on the Moon and gave a back rub to an alien who had chronic cramps. Robby, Hatchi and JPS-19 arrive on the industrial planet Yokkamarché, conveniently where JPS-19, the Nagaya Voyager and Hizakuriger were manufactured. Upon entering a dock, they meet a mechanic named Armeni, a huge fan of "Galaxy Traveler Hizakuriger", which ran for thirteen episodes but the twelfth episode was deemed lost after its original airing. Robby gives up a rare cel of the female protagonist named Rock from "Galaxy Traveler Hizakuriger", and Armeni agrees to repair Hizakuriger while noting that Robby's grandfather Yuma Yarge was the director for the anime series. Yang, Allo and Gras arrive on Yokkamarché, where the shopping district is full of classic anime media and merchandise. Armeni invites Robby to the archives, where superfans Animesu, Tierney, Gimency and Takuo eventually realize that Robby has seen the twelfth episode during childhood and attempt to extract it from his memory. Yang, Allo and Gras barge inside the dock, rescuing Robby and destroying the archives. Robby, Hatchi and JPS-19 hightail it out of Yokkamarché, while Yang realizes that Armeni is also a fan of his favorite romance anime series called "Binan Shonen Love-Love". Aboard the Nagaya Voyager, Robby recalls the ending of the twelfth episode, in which the protagonists Yuma and Rock wanted to make an outer space adventure movie together when they grow up.
10	"Never Get Involved in a Buddies' Quarrel"; Transliteration: "Badi Kenka wa Inumokuwanai" (Japanese: 相棒(バディ)喧嘩は犬も食わない)	June 10, 2019
Robby, Hatchi and JPS-19 make their way towards Hinaga Junction, the last Galaxy Highway checkpoint right before Isekandar. However, Hatchi ascertains that Robby is included in the list of criminals, debtors and other blacklisted individuals who cannot be granted entry to Isekandar. This erupts into a quarrel between Robby and Hatchi, which startles JPS-19. The cases that Robby and Hatchi argue about include issues concerning the bathroom, restroom, bedroom, noise, refrigerator, pajamas, laundry, mail order and lighting. They end up spray painting a line in the middle of the corridor, forbidding the other to cross over. Meanwhile, Yang, Allo and Gras enjoy sukiyaki together while planning to capture Robby at Hinaga Junction. Hatchi begins to realize that Robby generously gave him a pair of "I Love Space" pajamas and a Martian souvenir octopus candle. When JPS-19 activates the warp drive of the Nagaya Voyager, the candle accidentally knocks over and starts a fire in the corridor. Robby prepares to use the pajamas to put out the flames, but JPS-19 ultimately uses a fire extinguisher hidden inside him. As Robby, Hatchi and JPS-19 reach Hinaga Junction, Hatchi secretly pays off Robby's debt, which grants them entry to Isekandar without a problem. Yang, Allo and Gras wait in customs, unaware that Robby, Hatchi and JPS-19 were never detained. Robby, Hatchi and JPS-19 then approach Isekandar, not knowing that they are being followed by the Lunar Fleet.
11	"Common Fame Is a Common Isekandar"; Transliteration: "Ki'ite Gokuraku, Isekandaru" (Japanese: 聞いて極楽、イセカンダル)	June 17, 2019
Robby, Hatchi and JPS-19 learn that a collection of sponsoring ads create the sparkling rings orbiting around Isekandar. At a local temple filled with vendors, Robby is roped into attending a cabaret while Hatchi and JPS-19 visit a manjū restaurant. They briefly spot a sacred bird called an Akafu jack, rumored to extend one's life by a hundred days upon praying to it. After staying the night at an inn, Robby, Hatchi and JPS-19 visit the sacred mountain Akafuji, a tourist attraction where the giant Akafucrystal is enshrined. The priestess named Spacia gives everyone a warm welcome. The souvenir bags are made from the pouches of Isekangaroos, the mascots of Isekandar. Robby uses a sledgehammer to dent the Akafucrystal, revealed to be made of polymer resin instead of natural stone. Upon finding a manmade hallway inside Akafuji, this leads Robby, Hatchi and JPS-19 to discover that Kodai and Morisugi have been conning visitors all along. The Akafu jack is just a drone, Spacia is only a diva actress, several tourists are actually standby extras and the Akafucrystal pieces are being mass-produced. Yang, Allo and Gras realize that Robby somehow paid off his debt. Robby, Hatchi and JPS-19 briefly visit the site of a genuine but small Akafucrystal in the outskirts. Upon arriving, Yang, Allo and Gras find out that the giant Akafucrystal is fake when they yank it out of Akafuji. As the Lunar Fleet approaches, Robby and JPS-19 learn that Hatchi is the Prince of the Moon.
12	"Dream of the Moon, Dream of the Earth"; Transliteration: "Tsuki no Yume, Chikyū no Yume" (Japanese: 月の夢、地球の夢)	June 24, 2019
Robby, Hatchi and JPS-19 escape aboard the Nagaya Voyager, hiding in a cargo spaceship after being chased by Yang, Allo and Gras as well as the Lunar Fleet in outer space. Upon being pestered by Robby and JPS-19, Hatchi lets slip that he paid off Robby's debt using the last of his finances. Hatchi explains that he ran away from the Luna Land Embassy in Neo Tokyo and eventually worked for Yang. Moreover, Hatchi's grandfather was the same first Japanese astronaut who ended up building a lunar kingdom. Hatchi is grateful that Robby fulfilled his thrill for adventure. When the chase resumes, Robby, Hatchi and JPS-19 latch onto a Dontsu Incorporated spaceship headed towards the Dontsu Private Hyperroad, a secret passageway between Earth and Isekandar. Yang, Allo and Gras fight off the Lunar Fleet before following suit chasing after Robby, Hatchi and JPS-19. However, the Lunar Fleet manages to ram into Yang, Allo and Gras, allowing Robby, Hatchi and JPS-19 to evade capture. A massive spaceship prepares to destroy Neo Tokyo, but Robby, Hatchi and JPS-19 crash-lands into the massive spaceship's blast port, causing the massive spaceship to self-destruct. Robby, Hatchi and JPS-19 survive by deploying inside Hizakuriger, earning them praise for being space heroes. Having kept a rock as a souvenir from Isekandar, Robby discovers that it contains a piece of the genuine Akafucrystal inside, giving it to Hatchi as payment for his loan. The final scene shows Robby, Hatchi and JPS-19 starting a new journey together.
