= Possibly the Greatest Alchemist of All Time =

Japanese light novel series

- First light novel volume cover, featuring (from left to right) Maria, Maple, Iruma Takumi, and Sofia

いずれ最強の錬金術師？ (Izure Saikyō no Renkinjutsu-shi?)
- Genre: Isekai
- Novel series
- Written by: Kogitsunemaru
- Published by: AlphaPolis
- Original run: August 6, 2017 – present
- Light novel
- Written by: Kogitsunemaru
- Illustrated by: Hitogome
- Published by: AlphaPolis
- Original run: February 28, 2018 – present
- Volumes: 18
- Manga
- Written by: Kogitsunemaru
- Illustrated by: Tarō Sasakama
- Published by: AlphaPolis
- English publisher: Alpha Manga
- Original run: August 17, 2018 – present
- Volumes: 9
- Anime television series
- Directed by: Naoyuki Kuzuya
- Written by: Mitsutaka Hirota
- Music by: Hiroshi Nakamura
- Studio: Studio Comet
- Licensed by: Crunchyroll
- Original network: Tokyo MX, BS11, AT-X
- Original run: January 8, 2025 – present
- Episodes: 12
- icon

Possibly the Greatest Alchemist of All Time (Japanese: いずれ最強の錬金術師？, Hepburn: Izure Saikyō no Renkinjutsu-shi?; lit. 'Someday Will I Be The Greatest Alchemist?') is a Japanese light novel series written by Kogitsunemaru and illustrated by Hitogome. Originally published online since August 2017, AlphaPolis have published eighteenth volumes of the series since February 2018. A manga adaptation illustrated by Tarō Sasakama began serialization online via AlphaPolis' manga website in August 2018 and has been collected in nine tankōbon volumes. The manga is published digitally in English through Alpha Manga. An anime television series adaptation produced by Studio Comet aired from January to March 2025. A second season has been announced.

== Plot ==
Takumi Iruma is accidentally caught up in a summoning spell to gather heroes in the fantasy world of Mildgard. Since he cannot be returned to Earth, the goddess Nolyn compensates him with the power of alchemy. Takumi prefers to live a peaceful life, but his incredible powers start attracting attention.

== Characters ==
=== "Wings of Nolyn" Members ===
Takumi Iruma (タクミ・イルマ)
Voiced by: Shogo Sakata (Japanese); Zac Loera (English)
A Japanese salaryman who was accidentally summoned to the world of Mildgard by the goddess Nolyn. His body was disintegrated by the spell, so Nolyn resurrects him as a teenager and gives an array of magical powers to make a new life for himself in Mildgard. Initially, Takumi wants to live peacefully and avoid conflict, so he decides to become an alchemist in the city of Bolton, but to gain employment, he has to become a member at the local adventurer's guild and fulfill at least one quest for them per month. His inventions cause the kingdom of Barcula to get unwanted attention from the Holy Sidonia Empire, which gets inspired to summon three heroes from Takumi's old world. He soon becomes the ruler of Wedgefort, a town that he built.
Sofia Sylphid (ソフィア・シルフィード, Sofia Shirufīdo)
Voiced by: Ai Kayano (Japanese); Dee Meo (English)
An elf and Takumi's adventuring partner. She was crippled and under a magic sealing curse before Takumi healed her. She is initially harsh and tries to keep her distance from Takumi, but after her healing, she becomes nicer and develops feelings for him.
Maria (マリア)
Voiced by: Nao Tōyama (Japanese); Monica Flatley (English)
Takumi's housekeeper and Sofia's best friend. She is trained in cooking, cleaning and fighting, to the point she becomes excited whenever Takumi crafts tools that facilitate her tasks. Maria is cheerful and more socially adept, providing a contrast to the more restrained Sofia.
Maple (カエデ, Kaede)
Voiced by: Afumi Hashi (Japanese); Jessica Peterson (English)
A Killer Spider that helps Takumi survive an attack from a wild boar. Takumi decides to adopt her and they form a telepathic bond, which allows Takumi to interpret her thoughts as spoken words. Because of her ability to produce silk, she becomes an asset to Takumi's production efforts. Takumi named her Maple due to the pattern on her back that resembles a maple leaf. She later evolves into an Arachne with a human torso atop her spider body and develops the ability to speak with others without Takumi having to act as her translator. It is through her that Takumi finds and adopts a Drake Horse who later evolved into a Dragon Horse named Camellia, whom Maple grows attached to. She can enter and exit Takumi's pocket dimension at will.
Reyva (レーヴァ, Rēva)
Voiced by: Nene Hieda (Japanese); Kelsey Cruz (English)
A fox-girl that accepted to become a slave so that she could send money to her younger brother, who lives in a poor village. Despite her interest and skills in magic, she was unable to find an employer because she would require time-consuming training. Luckily, Takumi buys her over their shared interest in alchemy.
Máni (マーニ, Māni)
Voiced by: Moeka Koizumi (Japanese); Monica Piskor (English)
A bunny-girl widow who was forced out of her hometown by corrupt nobles. She at first distrusts Takumi and did not want to join him, but changes her mind after he saves her from monsters, making her see that he is not like the nobles who threatened her way of life.
Camellia
A Drake Horse who later evolves into a Dragon Horse. After Takumi's group rescue her from monsters, she joins them and helps pull their carriage. She gets along well with Maple, who likes to ride and sleep on her back.
Akane
One of the three heroes who was summoned by the Holy Empire of Sidonia, possessing an ability called the Blessing of Revelation that allows her to reveal a person's true intentions. She soon defects from the empire due to her distrusting their methods and joins Takumi's group.
Lulu
A catgirl slave who was given to Akane by the Holy Empire of Sidonia. She and Akane later escape from the empire and move to Wedgefort, where Takumi removes Lulu's collar. She still chooses to stay with Akane, but as a friend rather than a servant.
Titan
An iron golem whom Takumi befriends and becomes a member of his group.

=== Other characters ===
Goddess Nolyn (女神ノルン, Megami Norun)
Voiced by: Sora Amamiya (Japanese); Lexa Childress (English)
A goddess that accidentally summoned Takumi to the world of Mildgard. As an apology, she resurrects him as a teenager and gives him magical powers so he can start a new life as an alchemist. It is later revealed that she actually brought Takumi to Mildgard before the Holy Sidonia Empire could summon three heroes, implying that Nolyn's summoning might not actually have been accidental.
Molly
A young girl whom Takumi meets after saving her from a monster. She is the first human that Takumi meets in his new life.
Banga and Martha
Molly's parents.
Elizabeth
The empress of the Holy Empire of Sidonia, who summoned the three heroes.
Papek
A trader who forms good terms with Takumi.
Heath, Riell, and Bogar
Members of the party Lion Fang.
Mulan
The owner of the Mulan Slave Company.
Akira and Yamato
The other two heroes who were summoned by the Holy Empire of Sidonia. Unlike Akane, they are more willing to help the empire, eventually becoming ruthless warriors as a result of a drug that the empire fed them, which Akane managed to resist.
Barack
A guildmaster whom Takumi works with and helps train him.
Marquis Godwin Bolton
A noble who works in Bolton.
Dgambo
A blacksmith dwarf.
Burton
The manager of the Palum Company.
Lobos Barcula
The ruler of Bolton's capital.

== Media ==
=== Light novel ===
No.	Release date	ISBN
1	February 28, 2018	978-4-434-24342-4
2	April 30, 2018	978-4-434-24576-3
3	September 30, 2018	978-4-434-25200-6
4	January 31, 2019	978-4-434-25594-6
5	June 30, 2019	978-4-434-26124-4
6	October 31, 2019	978-4-434-26664-5
7	March 31, 2020	978-4-434-27239-4
8	November 30, 2020	978-4-434-28128-0
9	May 31, 2021	978-4-434-28892-0
10	August 31, 2021	978-4-434-29267-5
11	December 31, 2021	978-4-434-29728-1
12	May 31, 2022	978-4-434-30331-9
13	September 30, 2022	978-4-434-30875-8
14	January 31, 2023	978-4-434-31501-5
15	October 31, 2023	978-4-434-32816-9
16	May 31, 2024	978-4-434-33918-9
17	December 30, 2024	978-4-434-35012-2
18	September 30, 2025	978-4-434-36426-6

=== Manga ===
A manga adaptation illustrated by Tarō Sasakama began serialization on AlphaPolis' manga website in August 2018. The manga's chapters have been collected in nine tankōbon volumes as of December 2024. AlphaPolis has published the series in English on their Alpha Manga app. AlphaPolis would later publish the English version physically starting in 2026.

No.	Original release date	Original ISBN	English release date	English ISBN
1	March 31, 2019	978-4-434-25609-7	March 31, 2023 (digital); April 7, 2026 (print)	979-8-9933-4766-0
2	February 29, 2020	978-4-434-27000-0	March 31, 2023 (digital); June 9, 2026 (print)	979-8-9933-4767-7
3	December 31, 2020	978-4-434-28252-2	March 31, 2023 (digital); August 4, 2026 (print)	979-8-9933-4768-4
4	September 30, 2021	978-4-434-29407-5	August 25, 2023 (digital)	—
5	August 31, 2022	978-4-434-30758-4	December 22, 2023 (digital)	—
6	July 31, 2023	978-4-434-32319-5	April 26, 2024 (digital)	—
7	May 31, 2024	978-4-434-33910-3	December 20, 2024 (digital)	—
8	December 31, 2024	978-4-434-34999-7	October 24, 2025 (digital)	—
9	March 31, 2026	978-4-434-37494-4	—	—

=== Anime ===
An anime television series adaptation was announced on May 9, 2024. It is produced by Studio Comet and directed by Naoyuki Kuzuya, with Mitsutaka Hirota writing series scripts, Sayaka Anesaki designing the characters, and Hiroshi Nakamura composing the music. The series aired from January 8 to March 26, 2025, on Tokyo MX and BS11. The opening theme song is "TREASURE!", performed by Dialogue+, while the ending theme song is "Twinkle Days" (トゥインクル・デイズ; Tuinkuru・Deizu), performed by harmoe. Crunchyroll streamed the series. The company is set to release the series in Blu-ray set on March 10, 2026.

A second season was announced on September 11, 2025.

==== Episodes ====
No.	Title	Directed by	Storyboarded by	Original release date (Note: Episodes are released on ABEMA and Crunchyroll a week before their televised airings.)
1	"I Was Summoned By Accident"; Transliteration: "Makikomarete Shōkan Saremashita" (Japanese: 巻き込まれて召喚されました)	Kyohei Suzuki	Naoyuki Kuzuya	January 8, 2025
Takumi Iruma is accidentally caught in a summoning spell that takes him to the world of Mildgard. The Goddess Nolyn explains the spell was cast by the Holy Empire of Sidonia to summon three heroes. As Takumi was an unintended fourth target, she can't send him home, so as a consolation, she gives him magical abilities and sends him to a remote area in the Kingdom of Barcula to start a new life. He encounters a young girl named Molly and rescues her from a monster. In Sidonia, the three heroes meet Empress Elizabeth. The hero Akane receives a Blessing of Revelation from Nolyn that tells her that Elizabeth cannot be trusted. Molly's parents Banga and Martha explain their village is a haven for craftsmen. Takumi chooses to be an alchemist and a blacksmith. Whilst searching for potion ingredients, he encounters an Armoured Boar and an injured Poison Spider. Surprisingly, the spider helps him, allowing him time to deconstruct the boar's brain with alchemy, killing it. After healing the spider, he tames her into a pet, giving her the ability to speak to him telepathically. He also names her Maple due to the pattern on her back resembling a maple leaf, causing her to evolve into a Killer Spider. He brings the boar's body back to the village, and the villagers are surprised that he managed to tame a Killer Spider, which is thought to be impossible. One of Nolyn's Goddess friends is curious what plans she has for Takumi, given that when she sent him to Mildgard, she also sent him a year into the past, long before the Empire summons the other heroes.
2	"To A New Land"; Transliteration: "Shintenchi e" (Japanese: 新天地へ)	Masao Arai	Naoyuki Kuzuya	January 15, 2025
Takumi desires to visit a city to study alchemy so the villagers arrange a carriage to the city of Bolton. Martha realizes Takumi can use Light Magic, which is used to heal and purify, and warns him people may try to take advantage. Takumi promises to return as he now views the village as his home. The carriage is operated by the trader Papek and his bodyguards Heath, Riell, and Bogar, who are also surprised that he has a pet Killer Spider. Seeing the quality of his goods, Papek offers to buy Takumi's healing potions. After defeating some goblins, they arrive at Bolton where, discovering there is no Alchemist Guild, Takumi registers as an adventurer. He then sells his potions to Papek for 7000 silver (¥7,000,000) and rents a house and workshop. Takumi notices the city has an inefficient sewage system, so he crafts a toilet that purifies waste. Papek is astounded at such an invention and places an order for 100 toilets. He also warns Takumi if word of his Light Magic reaches the Sidonia Empire, there is a possibility he will be kidnapped by the Sidonian Church of Holy Light, which believes all Light Magic belongs to them. To assist with production, Papek recommends buying a slave. Takumi is repulsed by slavery, but soon realizes he will need the help as he must complete a quest once a month to remain an adventurer. While waiting for the manager of the Mulan Slave Company, Takumi encounters a female elf who tells him to get out.
3	"Contracts and Oaths"; Transliteration: "Keiyaku to Chikai" (Japanese: 契約と誓い)	Maezono Fumio	Naoyuki Kuzuya	January 22, 2025
The manager, Mulan, explains that slaves have rights and owners are expected to provide them with a good life. Takumi asks for someone who can manage his household and accompany him on quests. Mulan recommends the maid Maria to manage his home. Takumi hears about another slave from Maria and Mulan reluctantly shows him the elf, Sofia, who has crippled limbs and had her magic sealed by a curse. Takumi decides to contract with her, claiming he can fix everything. Sofia feels she has no choice, so Takumi signs contracts with both Maria and Sofia. Takumi visits a church and is curious why Nolyn dislikes Sidonia. Nolyn appears and explains she is worshipped by the Church of Creation, but Sidonia follows the Church of Holy Light which worships a Goddess named Anat, who doesn't exist, and uses their false piety to amass power. She also warns Takumi that her blessing will soon weaken and he will have to start relying on himself. A year in the future, the heroes Akira and Yamato are convinced to train as warriors, but Akane continues to resist Elizabeth. Sofia is convinced Takumi has evil intentions after witnessing his experiments. However, Takumi was actually levelling up his Light magic. With his preparations complete, Takumi successfully dispels Sofia's curse and heals her crippled body. Sofia realizes she was wrong about him.
4	"Takumi Party's First Battle!"; Transliteration: "Takumipātī, Uijin!" (Japanese: タクミパーティー、初陣!)	Kōichirō Kuroda	Naoyuki Kuzuya	January 29, 2025
Takumi realizes alchemy is rare because all alchemical texts are in a dead language that only he can read thanks to Nolyn's blessing. Takumi plans to start adventuring now that Sofia can act as his bodyguard. Maria asks to accompany them and Takumi discovers Maria has combat magic, plus warrior and thief skills. After crafting weapons and armor for them, Maria and Sofia register as adventurers. Thuggish adventurers pick a fight, which Takumi wins using alchemy to coat his skin in unbreakable diamond. Guildmaster Barack takes note of this and gives him several quests suited to his skills. After slaying goblins and kobolds, gathering herbs, and slaying a Goblin General, Maple soon evolves into an Arachne with a human torso atop her spider body, allowing her to talk without Takumi having to translate for her. Having completed all their quests in less than 12 hours, Takumi is promoted to Rank E and both girls to Rank F. Maria asks for new underwear for herself and Sofia and becomes obsessed when Takumi shows her modern panties and bras. Papek introduces Takumi to Marquis Godwin Bolton who is impressed with his toilets and in exterminating the goblin general. Takumi finishes the panties, but the embarrassment is so great that he goes temporarily mad, frustrating the girls.
5	"Shadow of Sidonia"; Transliteration: "Shidonia no Kage" (Japanese: シドニアの影)	Yoshitaka Koyama	Naoyuki Kuzuya	February 5, 2025
Takumi invents a fridge. He also plans to upgrade their armour with mythril and adamantite mined from the city of Horas. Barack assigns him a quest to slay monsters in the mine in exchange for ore. He also asks him to hunt Treant wood from a forest whilst bodyguarding a blacksmith. Papek loans him horses in exchange for some of the ore and extra fridges. The blacksmith they escort is the dwarf Dgambo. The king's attempts to make Takumi's toilets widespread in Barcula gains attention from the Sidonia Empire. In the future, Akira and Yamato become deadly fighters devoted to Sidonia while Akane openly dislikes Elizabeth. Takumi and the girls hunt dozens of Treants. In the mine, Takumi exterminates Iron Moles and is allowed to mine ore. With Dgambo's help, Takumi makes armor for himself and the girls plus weapons imbued with magic. Sofia also requests a shield. Nolyn looks into the future and sees Akira and Yamato involved in a bloody conflict as the Emperor sends them to the Samandor Kingdom. Sofia notices Takumi exhausting himself working on her shield and decides he needs a proper assistant. Sidonia contacts Barcula's king, demanding information on the toilets that use Light Magic.
6	"A Drake Horse Appears"; Transliteration: "Ryūba Arawaru" (Japanese: 竜馬現る)	Katsunari Mikajiri	Naoyuki Kuzuya	February 12, 2025
A representative from Sidonia insists that the blasphemous magician using Light Magic to create toilets be surrendered or the Church of Holy Light will withdraw all their priests from Barcula. The king finds this hilarious and invites their bothersome priests to leave whenever they want. Takumi is invited to meet the king. Maria suspects Sofia has fallen in love with Takumi. Nolyn informs Takumi about sending him a year into the past, so the other three heroes won't even be summoned for several months. Takumi creates a coach for the week-long journey and at Maria's urging, hunts down a Drake Horse, a monster known to be much faster than normal horses. Maple makes friends with an injured Drake Horse after saving it from monstrous bugs, so Takumi places it with Maple in his storage dimension, unaware that storing an untamed monster is highly dangerous, and he passes out. Maria and Sofia worry he might die since the magical strain keeps him unconscious, yet he can't release the Drake until he wakes up, or Maple opens the dimension from the inside. Sofia is able to use telepathy to reach Maple, who opens the dimension and places the Drake Horse in the garden. Takumi eventually awakens, tames the Drake Horse, and names her Camellia.
7	"The Fox-Eared Girl of the Royal Capital"; Transliteration: "Ōto no Kitsune-Mimi Shōjo" (Japanese: 王都の狐耳少女)	Kyōhei Suzuki	Kyōhei Suzuki	February 19, 2025
In the capital at the Palum Slave Trading Company, a fox-girl named Reyva, who is capable of magic, appears for sale, but no one buys her as she requires time-consuming training. Takumi finishes their coach and enchants it with Spacial Expansion, so the inside contains bedrooms, kitchen and a toilet. He has Camellia pull it as Maple rides on her back. Marquis Godwin decides to increase his protection of Takumi from other nations, especially Sidonia. In the future, Akane studies the Church of Holy Light and finds they believe Goddess Anat created humans to be superior to all other races. Arriving in the capital, Papek suggests creating a second enchanted carriage as a gift for the king. With 5 days until they meet the king, Takumi agrees, so Papek arranges a private work space at the Palum Company. Sofia puts her foot down and demands that Takumi find an assistant. Palum's manager, Burton, arranges for him to meet Reyva. Reyva believes Takumi will reject her too, but she is thrilled when Takumi offers to teach her and send her wages to help her mother and brother. Sidonia's emperor is furious that Barcula's king has ignored his demands concerning Takumi, and considers invading in response. Elizabeth cautions him to wait until they summon the three heroes before starting a war, and in the meantime spread a rumor about a craftsman disrespecting the church, causing their believers to find Takumi for them.
8	"Let's Choose a Party Name!"; Transliteration: "Pātī Mei o Kimeyō!" (Japanese: パーティー名を決めよう！)	Fumio Maezono	Kōji Yoshikawa, Hikaru Takeuchi & Naoyuki Kuzuya	February 26, 2025
The king, Lobos Barcula, casually introduces himself to a shocked Takumi hours before the official ceremony. Lobos regrets he cannot grant Takumi a noble rank for his work, as it would reveal his identity to Sidonia. Elizabeth's spies obtain one of Takumi's devices that purify the sewers, so she sends men to Bolton to kill the craftsman responsible. Reyva registers as an adventurer and the guild reminds Takumi his party needs a name. Barack begins training Takumi to fight. In the future, Akane is increasingly disturbed by the beliefs of the church and fears what such an organization wants her, Akira, and Yamato to do. Takumi creates a staff of mithril and Treant wood for Reyva. Barack assigns Takumi a 4-day quest to escort a merchant to Kilbus Village where he will be trading Takumi's purification devices to other countries. Takumi is delighted to find Kilbus has milk and cheese, which Takumi has not had since leaving Japan. He also learns Samandor Kingdom grows rice, though importing it is difficult. Feeling nostalgic for his old life Takumi suddenly decides on a party name: Wings of Nolyn. They return to Bolton where assassins attack them with paralysis poison, but Takumi possesses a poison resistance skill and uses Barack's training to defeat the assassins easily with Maple's help; Maple is also immune to the poison. Barack arrests the assassins and insists Takumi tell Marquis Godwin about the attack so he can do something about it.
9	"Resolve"; Transliteration: "Kesshin" (Japanese: 決心)	Masahiko Watanabe	Naoyuki Kuzuya	March 5, 2025
The assassins are identified as Sidonia's Divine Light Squadron. Fortunately, Godwin, the Church of Creation, and the Adventurers Guild agree Takumi's safety is their top priority. Takumi begins working on a barrier device to protect their home. The girls insist on adding a female warrior to their party to protect Takumi on quests. Takumi experiments with creating golems as an extra layer of defense. Following his squad's capture, the Emperor decides to temporarily leave Takumi alone and focus on summoning the hero's in three months. As creating a golem is difficult, Maple suggests Takumi should simply tame a wild one. Takumi locates an Iron Golem which turns out to be guarding a temple dedicated to Nolyn, making it his immediate friend and he tames it without needing to fight it. He names it Titan. In the future, Akira and Yamato become arrogant and cruel and Akane wants nothing to do with them. Titan receives a robot-like body of adamantine and mithril, the ability to talk, and a second, much larger body for emergencies. Meanwhile, Nolyn is concerned the belief from the Church of Divine Light's followers might cause Anat to manifest as an actual Goddess, an evil one. She hopes Takumi will soon be powerful enough to end the war with Sidonia in the future.
10	"Takumi Takes on Pioneering!"; Transliteration: "Takumi, Kaitaku ni Chōsen!" (Japanese: タクミ、開拓に挑戦！)	Masayuki Egami	Naoyuki Kuzuya	March 12, 2025
A village to the south of Bolton is abandoned by corrupt nobles, forcing the villagers to leave. The young woman Máni is especially bitter as their poverty contributed to her husband's death. Godwin plans to settle them in undeveloped land overrun by monsters and asks Takumi to establish a village. With his alchemy and his friends magic, Takumi constructs a well-fortified town near good farmland and a water source in only ten days. At first the refugees are skeptical, believing they are being sent to monster-filled territory to get rid of them, so they are shocked to see an entire town with a castle and soldier barracks to defend them. Máni cannot trust Takumi and after being rude to him, decides to leave the area, convinced Takumi will eventually throw her out for insulting him. Monsters attack and Máni is trapped outside the wall, but Takumi saves her. Máni realizes his generosity is genuine and accepts his offer to work as his maid. Godwin is glad Takumi succeeded, but also reveals the new town is strategically located. Sidonia's Emperor is furious Barcula Kingdom has placed a town full of soldiers right next to his empire's borders. Elizabeth reveals that her spell is ready. In the town, everybody suddenly feels a pulse of unnatural magic, causing Takumi to realize it has been exactly one year since he arrived, meaning Sidonia has just summoned the heroes.
11	"Signs of Turmoil"; Transliteration: "Haran no Yochō" (Japanese: 波乱の予兆)	Yasuyuki Fuse	Naoyuki Kuzuya	March 19, 2025
Three months after the hero summoning, Takumi's town has grown and has been named Wedgefort. The heroes begin visiting other kingdoms, scaring believers of the Church of Creation. Papek hires Takumi to escort the heroes to the royal capital Bakilatos. Akira and Yamato begin casually abusing innocent people. Akane, with her blessing of Revelation, senses something she needs in Bakilatos. Akira and Yamato barge into the Bakilatos Guild and attempt to buy Máni and Sofia, only for Takumi to refuse their demands while Máni and Sofia are not willing to leave Takumi, but the heroes refuse to take no for an answer. Takumi then destroys Akira's sword and takes down Yamato after they charge at him. The heroes leave, but swear revenge. Akane realizes Takumi is what she has been searching for and after receiving advice from him, flees to Takumi's hotel with her loyal slave Lulu while Takumi's friends take out the guards chasing them. Takumi admits that he was the fourth hero accidentally summoned by Sidonia and sent to the past by Nolyn. Akane realizes Sidonia only summoned heroes to legitimize Anat and gain more followers for when they declare war. Akane shares her belief that Akira and Yamato's personalities only changed due to being drugged, which she avoided with Purification Magic. At Akane's request, Takumi removes Lulu's slave collar, though she remains friends with Akane and does not want to leave her side. Takumi decides to take Akane and Lulu to his home and informs King Lobos Barcula what happened. An army of monsters attacks Wedgefort. Takumi cancels all his slave contracts, wanting everyone to stay with him by their own choice. He also constructs two swords; Holy Sword Amaterasu and Sublime Sword Tsukuyomi. The Guild sends an emergency summons to Takumi and all A and B Rank adventurers to urgently defend Wedgefort.
12	"When Bonds Are Tested"; Transliteration: "Kizuna ga Tamesareru Toki" (Japanese: 絆が試される時)	Yurika Fukaya, Shinya Une & Naoyuki Kuzuya	Naoyuki Kuzuya	March 26, 2025
Takumi joins the parties Lion Fang and Crimson Rose. Takumi gifts Amaterasu to Sofia and keeps Tsukuyomi for himself. They arrive and find Wedgefort under attack with the villagers reporting the monsters are using tactics. Takumi theorizes the excess mana from Sidonia's hero summoning might have evolved some monsters, making them capable of controlling the others. The Emperor is pleased monsters are attacking Wedgefort and decides to send the heroes to prevent Samandor Kingdom from sending help to Barcula. During the next attack, the monster's leader appears, a two headed dragon. Sofia puts herself in danger and is injured. Takumi combines Amaterasu and Tsukuyomi, cuts the dragon in half and scolds Sofia for putting herself in danger. After several days rebuilding Wedgefort, Takumi and the others return to Bolton. Akira and Yamato massacre an innocent village in Samandor, having decided that they don't need Akane after all. Seeing Sofia is upset, the others urge Takumi to make up with her. After apologizing, the mood almost turns romantic, but Akane tactlessly interrupts. Akane swears to stop the heroes the next time they meet after learning of their ruthless nature. Takumi speaks with Nolyn and assures her he will fight to protect what he cares about. He also finally delivers the sweets she asked for. Nolyn regrets the future will not be easy for Takumi, but it will be worth it once he becomes the greatest living alchemist and saves the world.
