= Studio Comet =

Japanese animation studio

Studio Comet Co., Ltd.

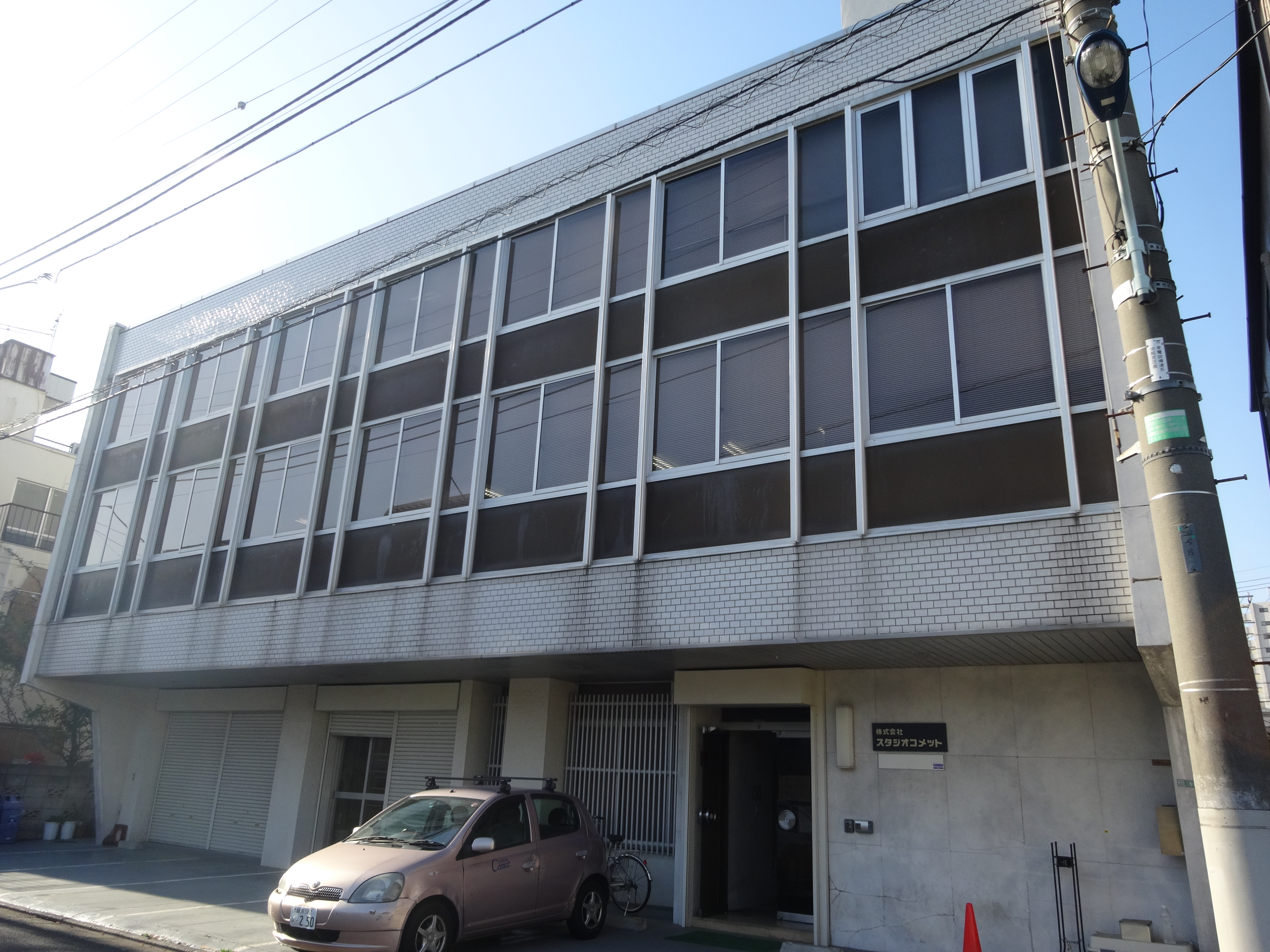
- NRM Building in Nerima, where the head office is located
- Native name: 株式会社スタジオコメット
- Romanized name: Kabushiki Kaisha Sutajio Kometto
- Type: Kabushiki gaisha
- Industry: Japanese TV, movie, and animation studio
- Founded: January 21, 1986; 40 years ago
- Headquarters: Toyotamanaka, Nerima, Tokyo, Japan
- Number of employees: 60 (as of August 2024)
- Website: Studio Comet homepage

Studio Comet Co., Ltd. (Japanese: 株式会社スタジオコメット, Hepburn: Kabushiki Kaisha Sutajio Kometto) is an animation studio with its headquarters in Toyotamanaka, Nerima, Tokyo, Japan. It was established on January 21, 1986.

== Notable staff ==
- Hiroshi Kanazawa (animation director, character designer)
- Kazuo Harada (animation producer, sound effects and audio director)
- Shin Misawa (animation)

== Productions ==
Title	Media type	Run dates
A Livid Lady's Guide to Getting Even	TV series	2026
A Salad Bowl of Eccentrics	TV series	2024; with SynergySP
Art of Fighting	OVA	1993
Baby Princess 3D Paradise Love	OVA	2011
Bikkuriman 2000	first digital production, TV series	2000
Bowwow Celebrity Poodle Let's Go! Tetsunoshin	TV series	2006
Capeta	TV series	2005–2006
Captain Tsubasa J	TV series	1994–1995
Chō Hatsumei Boy Kanipan	TV series	1999
Cute High Earth Defense Club Eternal Love!	Theatrical film	2025
Cute High Earth Defense Club LOVE! LOVE!	TV series	2016
Cute High Earth Defense Club HAPPY KISS!	TV series	2018
Dragon Quest	TV series	1989–1991
Dr. Rin ni Kiitemite!	TV series	2001
Fairy Ranmaru	TV series	2021
Fatal Fury: Legend of the Hungry Wolf	TV special	1992
Fatal Fury: The Motion Picture	Theatrical film	1994
Fatal Fury 2: The New Battle	TV special	1993
Haibara's Teenage New Game+	TV series	2026
Hatsumei Boy Kanipan	TV series	1998
Highschool! Kimengumi	TV series (from ep.9, working with Gallop)	1985–1987
High School Mystery: Gakuen Nanafushigi	TV series	1991
Humanoid Monster Bem	TV series	2006
I'm Looking for Zombies	TV series	2026
Initial D	TV series	1998; with Studio Gallop on behalf of Pastel
Jewelpet	TV series	2009; with Sanrio and Sega Sammy Group (both uncredited)
Jewelpet Twinkle☆	TV series	2010; with Sanrio and Sega Sammy Group (both uncredited)
Jewelpet Sunshine	TV series	2011; with Sanrio and Sega Sammy Group (both uncredited)
Jewelpet Kira☆Deco	TV series	2012; with Sanrio and Sega Sammy Group (both uncredited)
Jewelpet the Movie: Sweets Dance Princess	Theatrical film	2012; with Sanrio and Sega Sammy Group (both uncredited)
Jewelpet Happiness	TV series	2013; with Sanrio (uncredited)
Lady Jewelpet	TV series	2014–2015; with Zexcs and Sanrio (uncredited)
Kero Kero Chime	TV series	1997
Kirby: Right Back at Ya!	TV series	2001–2003; with Studio Sign and Nintendo Stars Inc. (Note: credited as Warpstar, Inc.)
Maboroshi Mabo-chan	TV series	1992
Meimon! Dai San Yakyūbu	TV series	1988–1989
Mizuiro Jidai	TV series	1996
Mutsuen Meiryū Gaiden: Shura no Toki	TV series	2004
Onegai My Melody	TV series	2005; with Sanrio (uncredited)
Onegai My Melody: Kuru Kuru Shuffle	TV series	2006; with Sanrio (uncredited)
Onegai My Melody: Sukkiri	TV series	2007; with Sanrio (uncredited)
Onegai My Melody: Kirara	TV series	2008; with Sanrio (uncredited)
Onegai My Melody: Yū & Ai	Theatrical film	2012; with Sanrio (uncredited)
Peach Girl	TV series	2005
Possibly the Greatest Alchemist of All Time	TV series	2025
Reborn to Master the Blade: From Hero-King to Extraordinary Squire	TV series	2023
Reincarnated as a Neglected Noble: Raising My Baby Brother with Memories from My Past Life	TV series	2025
RobiHachi	TV series	2019
Samurai Shodown	TV special	1994; with Studio Gazelle
School Rumble	TV series	2004
School Rumble: Second Term	TV series	2006
Shin Megami Tensei: D-Children – Light and Dark	TV series (from ep.27)	2002–2003
Shōta no Sushi	TV special	1999
Sora no Manimani	TV series	2009
Suzuka	TV series	2005
The Marshmallow Times	TV series	2004
Tsuide ni Tonchinkan	TV series	1987–1988
Tsuyoshi Shikkari Shinasai	TV series	1992–1994
Ugoku! Neko Mukashi Banashi	ONA	2025
Whistle!	TV series	2002
