= Cute High Earth Defense Club Love! =

Japanese television series

- Key visual featuring the five main characters in uniform

美男高校地球防衛部LOVE! @ (Binan Kōkō Chikyū Bōei-bu Love!)
- Genre: Magical boy, parody
- Light novel
- Written by: Natsuko Takahashi
- Illustrated by: Yumiko Hara
- Published by: Pony Canyon
- Imprint: Ponikanyon
- Original run: January 6, 2015 – present
- Manga
- Written by: Mizu Morino
- Magazine: Pony Canyon
- Original run: October 16, 2014 – June 25, 2015
- Volumes: 1
- Video game
- Developer: Anipani Co. Ltd
- Publisher: Anipani Co. Ltd
- Genre: Otome
- Platform: iOS; Android
- Released: February 26, 2015
- Anime television series
- Directed by: Shinji Takamatsu
- Written by: Michiko Yokote
- Music by: yamazo
- Studio: Diomedéa
- Licensed by: AUS: Madman Entertainment; NA: Ponycan USA
- Original network: TV Tokyo, TVA, TVO, AT-X
- English network: SEA: Animax Asia
- Original run: January 6, 2015 – March 24, 2015
- Episodes: 12
- Anime television series

Cute High Earth Defense Club LOVE! LOVE!
- Directed by: Shinji Takamatsu
- Written by: Michiko Yokote
- Music by: yamazo
- Studio: Studio Comet
- Licensed by: NA: Ponycan USA
- Original network: TV Tokyo, TVA, TVO, AT-X
- English network: US: Funimation
- Original run: July 8, 2016 – September 23, 2016
- Episodes: 12
- Original video animation

Cute High Earth Defense Club LOVE! LOVE! LOVE!
- Directed by: Shinji Takamatsu
- Written by: Michiko Yokote
- Music by: yamazo
- Studio: Studio Comet
- Released: August 26, 2017
- Runtime: 56 minutes
- Anime television series

Cute High Earth Defense Club HAPPY KISS!
- Directed by: Shinji Takamatsu
- Written by: Shinji Takamatsu
- Music by: yamazo
- Studio: Studio Comet
- Original network: TV Tokyo, TVO, AT-X
- Original run: April 8, 2018 – July 1, 2018
- Episodes: 12
- Anime film
- Cute High Earth Defense Club Eternal Love! (2025)
- Anime television series

Binan Kōkō Chikyū Bōei-bu Haikara!
- Directed by: Shinji Takamatsu
- Written by: Takashi Aoshima
- Music by: yamazo
- Studio: Studio Deen
- Original network: AT-X, Tokyo MX, BS NTV
- Original run: July 7, 2025 – September 22, 2025
- Episodes: 12

Cute High Earth Defense Club Love! (美男高校地球防衛部Love!, Binan Kōkō Chikyū Bōei-bu LOVE!; lit. 'Pretty Boy High School Earth Defense Club Love!') is a Japanese anime television series created by Kurari Umatani and produced by Diomedéa. The series is directed by Shinji Takamatsu and written by Michiko Yokote. The series premiered on January 6, 2015. The anime is licensed by Madman Entertainment in Australia and New Zealand and by Ponycan USA in North America, with Funimation and Crunchyroll streaming it. A second season premiered on July 7, 2016. An anime film opened in Japan in January 2025. A new anime series titled Binan Kōkō Chikyū Bōei-bu Haikara! aired from July to September 2025.

The story follows the lives of five ordinary boys who gain nature-based powers given to them by a mysterious creature from outer space. Calling themselves the "Earth Defense Club", they fight against the "Earth Conquest Club", whose members seek to conquer Earth.

A spin-off manga titled Binan Kokou Chikyuu Seifuku-bu Love! started serialization in Pony Canyon's web comics magazine online, on October 16, 2014. A light novel was released on January 7, 2015, in Japan, with two additional light novels released in 2016. A game based on the series for Android and iOS devices was released in Japan in February 2015.

== Plot ==
One day, the Earth Defense Club at Binan High School, consisting of Yumoto Hakone, En Yufuin, Atsushi Kinugawa, Io Naruko, and Ryuu Zaou, who regularly attend a local bathhouse run by Yumoto's brother, meet a pink wombat-creature from another planet who tasks them with saving the world. Using a set of "Loveracelets" he gives them, the group transforms into Battle Lovers (バトラヴァーズ, Batoravuāzu), who use the power of love to combat those intent on spreading hate and discord. As they battle, they encounter the Earth Conquest Club, which has fallen under the influence of the green hedgehog-like creature Zundar. Kinshiro Kusatsu, Ibushi Arima and Akoya Gero, the members of the school's student council, become their enemies, being responsible for creating the monsters they fight.

== Characters ==
=== Earth Defense Club ===
Originally an unofficial school club, the Earth Defense Club became semi-official because its members occupied a club room which had a sign reading "Earth Defense Club" on its door. After the student council orders them to formally register their club, it is later approved.

Yumoto Hakone (箱根 有基, Hakone Yumoto)
Voiced by: Kazutomi Yamamoto
A first-year student whose family owns a bathhouse called Kurotamayu. He is carefree and loves animals, cute things, and food. He transforms into the Sparkling Prince; Battle Lover Scarlet (キラメキ王子バトラヴァ・スカーレット, Kirameki Ouji Batorava Sukaaretto). His color is red and his element is light. His love stick is called Lumiere of Love, which allows him to use the attacks Scarlet Lumiere and Love Sprinkle.
En Yufuin (由布院 煙, Yufuin En)
Voiced by: Yūichirō Umehara
A third-year student who is lazy and prefers to go at his own pace. He is somewhat vain, as, despite having recently turned 18, he is worried that his youthful appearance is fading. He transforms into the Flashing Prince; Battle Lover Cerulean (ヒラメキ王子バトラヴァ・セルリアン, Hirameki Ōji Batorava Serurian). His color is blue and his element is water. His love stick is called Purifying Aqua, which allows him to use the attack Cerulean Aqua.
Atsushi Kinugawa (鬼怒川 熱史, Kinugawa Atsushi)
Voiced by: Kōtarō Nishiyama
A third-year student and Kinshiro's childhood friend, who comes from a rich family and has good grades. He transforms into the Piercing Prince; Battle Lover Epinard (ツラヌキ王子バトラヴァ・エピナール, Tsuranuki Ōji, Batoru Ravua Epināru). His color is green and his element is air. His love stick is called Gallant Hurricane, which allows him to use the attack Epinard Hurricane.
Io Naruko (鳴子 硫黄, Naruko Io)
Voiced by: Yusuke Shirai
A second year student who has made money through the stock market and believes that life is all about money. He is close to Ryuu and is implied to have romantic feelings for him. He transforms into the Roaring Prince; Battle Lover Sulfur (トドロキ王子バトラヴァ・サルファー, Todoroki Ōji Batorava Sarufā). His color is yellow and his element is earth. His love stick is called Raging Gaia, which allows him to use the attack Sulfur Gaia.
Ryuu Zaou (蔵王 立, Zaō Ryū)
Voiced by: Toshiki Masuda
A second year student who is popular with girls and best friends with Io. He transforms into the Thrilling Prince; Battle Lover Vesta (トキメキ王子バトラヴァ・ヴェスタ, Tokimeki Ouji, Batorava Vesuta). His color is pink and his element is fire. His love stick is called Blazing Ignit, which allows him to use the attack Vesta Ignit.
Wombat (ウォンバット, Uonbatto)
Voiced by: Mugihito
A pink wombat-like creature from another planet who tasks the club's members with the mission of protecting Earth from evil and filling it with love. He has the ability to control En and Atsushi's homeroom teacher, Mr. Tawarayama, when he holds him.

=== Conquest Club ===
Kinshiro Kusatsu (草津 錦史郎, Kusatsu Kinshirō)
Voiced by: Hiroshi Kamiya
A third year student and the president of the school's student council. He is childhood friends with Atsushi, but their relationship is distant and he dislikes that he hangs out with En and the club. He transforms into Aurite, the Golden Chevalier, shining in radiance (光輝く黄金のシュヴァリエ オーアイト, Hikari Kagayaku Ōgon no Shuvarie, Ōaito). At the end of season 1, he reconciles with Atsushi and they become friends again.
Ibushi Arima (有馬 燻, Arima Ibushi)
Voiced by: Jun Fukuyama
A third year student and the vice-president of the school's student council, who serves as Kinshiro's assistant. He transforms into Argent, the Silver Chevalier, rustling young leaves (風薫る白銀のシュヴァリエ アージエント, Kazekaoru Hakugin no Shuvarie, Ājento).
Akoya Gero (下呂 阿古哉, Gero Akoya)
Voiced by: Takuma Terashima
A second year student who is in the same class as Io and Ryuu, but does not get along with Ryuu. He transforms into Perlite, the Pearl Chevalier, making flowers bloom (花咲ける真珠のシュヴァリエ， ペルライト, Hanasakikeru Shinju no Shuvarie, Peruraito).
Zundar (ズンダー, Zundaa)
Voiced by: Hiroki Yasumoto
A green hedgehog-like creature from another planet who came to conquer Earth. He ends his sentences with "dar".

=== Monsters ===
People with strong negative feelings who Caerula Adamas turns into monsters using Zundar's needles.

Kazutake Chiku (知久和武, Chiku Kazutake)
Voiced by: Akira Ishida
An ordinary third-year high school student who does not stand out. He is turned into a chikuwabu monster.
Wario Hashida (橋田割男, Hashida Wario)
Voiced by: Katsuyuki Konishi
A high school student who is obsessed with order and rules. He is turned into a chopsticks monster.
Moteo Kurotori (黒鳥持手男, Kurotori Moteo)
Voiced by: Kōji Yusa
The advisor to the school's Ballet Club, who is obsessed with winning the school's pretty boy contest. He is turned into a black swan monster.
Oyaji Igarao (五十顔親治, Igarao Oyaji)
Voiced by: Kōsuke Toriumi
A high school student who is known as a "guy with the face of a 50-year old". He is turned into a bishōnen monster.
Enkaku Sōsa (宗佐円覚, Sōsa Enkaku)
Voiced by: Takuya Eguchi
A high-school student whose life is controlled by his father. He is turned into a remote control monster that resembles a squid.
Ichiban Itsumo (逸茂一番, Itsumo Ichiban)
Voiced by: Kenichi Suzumura
A third-year high-school student whose grades are "always No. 1". After his grade drops to No. 2 behind Io, his jealousy attracts Caerula Adamas and he is turned into a screw tank monster.
Shō Komi (古見翔, Komi Shō)
Voiced by: Yoshitsugu Matsuoka
A second-year high-school student who transferred to Binan High School at the end of his first year. After getting sick with the flu, he stopped coming to school and became a shut-in. He is turned into a hikikomori monster that would turn best friends against each other.
Uriya Makuwa (真桑ウリヤ, Makuwa Uriya)
Voiced by: Hikaru Midorikawa
An self-conscious high-school student who is turned into a melon monster.
Rui Megawa (芽川類, Megawa Rui)
Voiced by: Tsubasa Yonaga
Yumoto's classmate and the manager of the baseball club, who enjoys the attention he gets from wearing glasses. After Yumoto's cold turns him into a meganedanshi as well, Rui's jealousy causes him to be turned into a dog-like baseball bat monster with glasses.

=== Others ===
Gōra Hakone (箱根強羅, Hakone Gōra)
Voiced by: Tomokazu Sugita
Yumoto's older brother, who helps run the bathhouse and chop wood for the baths. The finale of the first season reveals that he was the original Battle Lover.
Kou Kinosaki (城崎コウ, Kinosaki Kō)
Voiced by: Showtaro Morikubo
The president of the Binan High Press Society. He is often seen observing the Defense Club.
Tazawa (田沢益也, Tazawa Masuya)
Voiced by: Yūichi Iguchi
The photographer for the Binan High Press Society. He is normally stoic, but passionate about photography.
Hireashi (ヒレアシ, Hireashi)
Voiced by: Hiroshi Ōtake
A mysterious talking goldfish that is involved with the Binan High Press Society. The finale of the first season reveals that he had been broadcasting a reality show about the Battle Lovers and Caerula Adamas throughout the universe.
Mr. Tawarayama (俵山先生, Tawarayama-sensei)
Voiced by: Mugihito
En and Atsushi's instructor, who is supposedly killed after tripping over Wombat and falls down a flight of stairs. While Wombat explains that he is not technically dead, he must remain near him to prevent him from suffering the effects of decomposition, using him as a cover to avoid appearing suspicious. While he later recovers, he is soon injured and falls into a coma again.

=== Season 2 ===
==== Vepper ====
Akihiko Beppu (別府月彦, Beppu Akihiko)
Voiced by: Keisuke Koumoto
A second year student and Haruhiko's twin brother, who, along with him, transforms into the twins shining in the heavens, Melty Luna (空に輝く二つ星・メルティルーナ, Sora ni kagayaku futatsu boshi Merutirūna).
Haruhiko Beppu (別府日彦, Beppu Haruhiko)
Voiced by: Yoshiki Murakami
A second year student and Akihiko's twin brother, who, along with him, transforms into The twins shining in the heavens, Salty Sol (空に輝く二つ星・ソルティーソル, Sora ni kagayaku futatsu boshi Sorutīsoru).
Dadacha (ダダチャ, Dadacha)
Voiced by: Hiroki Yasumoto

A flying squirrel-like creature who is Zundar's brother.

==== Monsters ====
People who are overcome with jealousy and are turned into monsters by The Vepper through Dadacha.

Tomaru Tokiwa (常盤都丸, Tokiwa Tomaru)
Voiced by: Akira Ishida
He is turned into an hourglass monster from his desire to return to the past. He has the earliest birthday among his classmates.
Tsukuna Ouso (大宇曽造那)
Voiced by: Soichiro Hoshi
A high school student who believes beauty is a sin, and is turned into a tofu monster.
Tagaru Katari (語多賀流, Katari Tagaru)
Voiced by: Katsuyuki Konishi
He is turned into a microphone monster from his desperation to steal the spotlight.
Alan Salvatore (アラン・サルヴァトーレ)
Voiced by: Takehito Koyasu
An Italian exchange student who is turned into a chest hair monster for having a hairless chest, unlike his twin brother.
Shuzo Oka (岡修造, Oka Shuzo)
Voiced by: Daisuke Namikawa
He is turned into a volleyball monster.
Kuroshiro Kumano (熊野九呂四郎, Kumano Kuroshiro)
Voiced by: Yoshitsugu Matsuoka
He is turned into a panda monster.
Kazuto Hijiriya (聖夜一人, Hijiriya Kazuto)
Voiced by: Kazuya Nakai
He is turned into a reindeer monster due to his loneliness during Christmas.
Shin Nito (仁藤真, Nito Shin)
Voiced by: Natsuki Hanae
He is turned into a snowman monster.
Entaro Meguriya (巡屋円太郎, Meguriya Entaro)
Voiced by: Daisuke Hirakawa
One of The Vepper's henchmen, who is turned into a merry-go-round monster.

== Media ==
=== Anime ===
The series, which was directed by Shinji Takamatsu at Diomedéa and written by Michiko Yokote, aired in Japan between January 6, 2015, and March 24, 2015, and was streamed by Crunchyroll, Funimation, and Viewster. The series is licensed in North America by Ponycan USA, who began releasing the series on Blu-ray Disc and DVD in August 2015. The first opening theme for season one is "Zettai Muteki☆Fallin'LOVE☆" (絶対無敵☆Fallin'LOVE☆, Absolutely Invincible Fallin' Love) by the Earth Defense Club (Kazutomi Yamamoto, Yuichiro Umehara, Kōtarō Nishiyama, Yusuke Shirai, and Toshiki Masuda), while the ending theme is "I Miss You no 3 Metre" (I miss you の3メートル, Three Metres of I Miss You) by the Conquest Club (Hiroshi Kamiya, Jun Fukuyama, Takuma Terashima). The second season aired in Japan titled Cute High Earth Defense Club Love! Love! from July 7, 2016, to September 27, 2016. The opening theme for Season two is "Futten Toppa☆LOVE IS POWER☆" (沸点突破☆ LOVE IS POWER ☆, Past the Boiling Point☆LOVE IS POWER☆) by the Earth Defense Club (Kazutomi Yamamoto, Yuichiro Umehara, Kōtarō Nishiyama, Yusuke Shirai, and Toshiki Masuda), the ending theme is "Anata wa Haruka Ittousei" (あなたは遥か一等星, You're a distant star of the first magnitude) by the Vepper/ Beppu brothers Keisuke Koumoto and Yoshiki Murakami.

A new anime series, titled Binan Kōkō Chikyū Bōei-bu Haikara! (美男高校地球防衛部ハイカラ!), was announced on March 17, 2025. It is produced by Studio Deen and directed by Takamatsu, with Takashi Aoshima writing the scripts, Ayashi Murakami designing the characters, and yamazo composing the music. The series aired from July 7 to September 22, 2025, on AT-X and other networks.

=== Manga ===
A parallel manga entitled Binan Kokou Chikyuu Seifuku-bu Love! (lit. 'Cute High Earth Conquest Club Love!') has finished its monthly serialization in Pony Canyon's web comics magazine, having started on October 16, 2014. The manga focuses more on the lives of the series' antagonists.

=== Light novel ===
A light novel series written by Natsuko Takahashi and illustrated by Yumiko Hara was released in Japan on January 7, 2015, as a paperback novel.

=== OVA ===
A OVA titled Binan Koukou Chikyuu Boueibu LOVE! LOVE! LOVE! (美男高校地球防衛部LOVE! LOVE! LOVE!), subtitled The Graduation of Love and Youth! (愛と青春の卒業!, Ai to Seishun no Sotsugyou!) which aired in select theatres across Japan for a 3-week period in August and September 2017, starting on August 26. It was preceded by an all night season two screening/advance OVA screening on August 25, 2017, exclusive to the Ticket Pia booking system. The OVA is said to be the "concluding chapter" about the graduation of the 3rd years. The opening theme is Eternal Future LOVE YOU ALL (永遠未来LOVE YOU ALL, Eien Mirai LOVE YOU ALL), while the ending is From Both Our Hearts (心と心で, Kokoro to Kokoro de). both by the Earth Defense Club.

=== Film ===
An anime film, titled Cute High Earth Defense Club Eternal Love!, which serves as a sequel to the original series and celebrates its 10th anniversary, was released on January 24, 2025. The staff and cast members from the series are reprising their roles.

== Reception ==
Reviews for the anime have been generally positive. Amy McNulty from Anime News Network gave the first three episodes of the series an "A" rating writing that: "Cute High Earth Defense Club LOVE! should make any anime fan laugh, although long-time fans of magical girl shows will get the jokes better by default. As a parody of a genre that can still entertain in its own right, this series walks the line of critiquing and venerating the magical girl genre with finesse. It's comedic, but it's not a gag-a-minute affair. Yes, it has over-the-top situations, but it's just slightly less believable than the typical magical girl show, so it works. We're not laughing at the show, we're laughing with it." When reviewing the ninth episode, to which she gave an A+ rating, McNulty later wrote that it: "demonstrates that the show entertains best when it's both a parody and a magical boy show in its own right. The fact that the boys are able to talk the melon monster down before they heal him with love is another fun twist on the give-speeches-about-justice-to-monster-then-heal-with-love formula. Overall, the viewers spend more time with this monster than any of the previous ones, paving the way for laughs aplenty."

Ian Wolf writing for Anime UK News gave the first two episodes a rating of 9 out of 10 saying: "Cute High Earth Defense Club LOVE! has so far proven itself to be a highly entertaining show, mainly because of the knowing parody it contains. The series mocks all of the normal magical girl tropes, whether it is the poses, the lines that are spouted, the transformations, or the attacks. The only real difference is the fact that you have male characters instead of female ones." He also stated comparisons to shows such as Ouran High School Host Club, a romantic comedy manga which also parodies romantic manga; and Free! in which he compares the similar fan-bases, namely fujoshi, saying: "Let's be honest, we all knew that as soon as the concept of five attractive boys akin to magical girls was revealed that every fujoshi and fudanshi was preparing to write quite a lot fan fiction."

In a review of the first three episodes Dan Barnett of UK-Anime Network gave the series 7 out of 10 claiming that: "Cute High Earth Defence Club Love is a series that has the potential to be a bit of a breakout hit if it plays its cards right. The series is undeniably hilarious as the characters take everything around them seriously, and sexual innuendo flies around so much that it's impossible to keep a straight face. The pains that Wombat must go through to try and avoid being cuddled by Yumoto are fantastically funny too! What might hold it back though is that three episodes in there's little evidence of a plot other than the bog standard 'bad guys make monster of the week' fare that's typical of the genre. ... It's a tricky line to walk if the series wants to keep as wide an audience as possible, though there are certainly fans around who'll happily pick-up another pretty-boy series to fill the void left by Free."
