= Michiko Yokote =

Japanese screenwriter

Michiko Yokote (横手 美智子, Yokote Michiko) is a Japanese screenwriter.

== Screenwriting ==
• Head writer/series composition denoted in bold

=== Anime television series ===
- Patlabor: The TV Series (1990)
- Ranma ½ (1990–1992)
- Rurouni Kenshin (1996)
- Magical Project S (1996–1997)
- You're Under Arrest (1996–1997)
- Adventures of Mini-Goddess (1998–1999)
- Cowboy Bebop (1998–1999)
- I'm Gonna Be An Angel! (1999)
- Magic User's Club (1999)
- Phantom Thief Jeanne (1999–2000)
- Carried by the Wind: Tsukikage Ran (2000)
- **Strange Dawn** (2000)
- The Kindaichi Case Files (2000)
- Gensomaden Saiyuki (2000–2001)
- **Gravitation** (2000–2001)
- You're Under Arrest 2 (2001)
- Comic Party (2001)
- **Haré+Guu** (2001)
- Hikaru no Go (2001–2003)
- .hack//SIGN (2002)
- Tokyo Underground (2002)
- Seven of Seven (2002)
- **Princess Tutu** (2002–2003)
- Naruto (2002–2005)
- **Air Master** (2003)
- Full-Blast Science Adventure – So That's How It Is (2003–2004)
- **Genshiken** (2004)
- The Marshmallow Times (2004–2005)
- Bleach (2004–2009)
- Ginban Kaleidoscope (2005)
- Strawberry Marshmallow (2005)
- **Kujibiki Unbalance** (2006)
- **xxxHolic** (2006)
- Sgt. Frog (2006)
- Blood+ (2006)
- Ayakashi: Samurai Horror Tales (2006)
- Kiba (2006)
- Digimon Data Squad (2006–2007)
- Gin Tama (2006–2013)
- Big Windup! (2007)
- **Mononoke** (2007)
- Junjo Romantica (2008)
- **xxxHolic: Kei** (2008)
- **Nabari no Ou** (2008)
- Junjo Romantica 2 (2008)
- **Valkyria Chronicles** (2009)
- Chrome Shelled Regios (2009)
- Kanamemo (2009)
- **Kobato** (2009–2010)
- Tamagotchi! (2009–2012)
- Squid Girl (2010)
- **C³** (2011)
- The World's Greatest First Love (2011)
- Shinryaku!? Ika Musume (2011)
- **Joshiraku** (2012)
- Brave 10 (2012)
- Hiiro no Kakera (2012)
- Tari Tari (2012)
- Say I Love You (2012)
- Kamisama Kiss (2012)
- Tamagotchi! Yume Kira Dream (2012–2013)
- Shirokuma Cafe (2012–2013)
- Ixion Saga DT (2012–2013)
- Saint Seiya Omega: Chapter Mars (2012–2013)
- **Genshiken 2** (2013)
- **Red Data Girl** (2013)
- **Devils and Realist** (2013)
- Senyu (2013)
- Tamako Market (2013)
- Nagi no Asukara (2013)
- **Saint Seiya Omega: Chapter Zodiac Temples** (2013–2014)
- Tamagotchi! Miracle Friends (2013–2014)
- **Love Stage!!** (2014)
- **Girl Friend Beta** (2014)
- **No-Rin** (2014)
- Witchcraft Works (2014)
- Notari Matsutarō (2014)
- **Shirobako** (2014–2015)
- GO-GO Tamagotchi! (2014–2015)
- **Seiyu's Life!** (2015)
- **Prison School** (2015)
- **Yamada-kun and the Seven Witches** (2015)
- **Cute High Earth Defense Club Love!** (2015)
- Mr. Osomatsu (2015)
- Dance with Devils (2015)
- Anti-Magic Academy: The 35th Test Platoon (2015)
- Junjo Romantica 3 (2015)
- **Rin-ne** (2015–2017)
- **Cute High Earth Defense Club LOVE! LOVE!** (2016)
- **Handa-kun** (2016)
- **The Disastrous Life of Saiki K.** (2016)
- **Kiss Him, Not Me** (2016)
- **ReLIFE** (2016)
- **Sekkō Boys** (2016)
- Rilu Rilu Fairilu: Yosei no Door (2016)
- D.Gray-man Hallow (2016)
- Dagashi Kashi (2016)
- **Masamune-kun's Revenge** (2017–2023)
- **Chronos Ruler** (2017)
- **Knight's & Magic** (2017)
- **Children of the Whales** (2017)
- **Teasing Master Takagi-san** (2018–2022)
- **Okko's Inn** (2018)
- Dagashi Kashi 2 (2018)
- Comic Girls (2018)
- Happy Sugar Life (2018)
- HUG! Pretty Cure (2018)
- **Tsurune** (2018–2019)
- **Bermuda Triangle: Colorful Pastrale** (2019)
- **The Magnificent Kotobuki** (2019)
- **Ao-chan Can't Study!** (2019)
- The Ones Within (2019)
- Science Fell in Love, So I Tried to Prove It (2020)
- **Heaven's Design Team** (2021)
- **The Great Jahy Will Not Be Defeated!** (2021)
- **Saiyuki Reload: Zeroin** (2022) – with Aya Matsui
- **Tribe Nine** (2022)
- Love All Play (2022)
- **The Greatest Demon Lord Is Reborn as a Typical Nobody** (2022)
- **Call of the Night** (2022)
- **Campfire Cooking in Another World with My Absurd Skill** (2023)
- **Onimai: I'm Now Your Sister!** (2023)
- **The Dreaming Boy Is a Realist** (2023)
- **Train to the End of the World** (2024)
- **Oblivion Battery** (2024)
- **Love Is Indivisible by Twins** (2024)
- **Puniru Is a Cute Slime** (2024)
- **Ruri Rocks** (2025)
- **The Shy Hero and the Assassin Princesses** (2025)
- **Inexpressive Kashiwada and Expressive Oota** (2025)
- **Always a Catch!: How I Punched My Way into Marrying a Prince** (2026)
- **Magilumiere Magical Girls Inc.** season 2 (2026)

=== Anime films ===
- Ah! My Goddess The Movie (2000)
- Saint Seiya Heaven Chapter – Overture (2004)
- Hikaru no Go: Journey to the North Star Cup (2004)
- Bleach: The DiamondDust Rebellion (2007)
- Crayon Shin-chan: Super-Dimension! The Storm Called My Bride (2010)
- Zunda Horizon (2017)
- Shirobako: The Movie (2020)
- Bright: Samurai Soul (2021)
- Cute High Earth Defense Club Eternal Love! (2025)

=== OVAs ===
- GinRei (1994)
- You're Under Arrest (1994–1995)
- Cho Kido Densetsu Dynagiga (1998)
- Saint Seiya: Hades (2002–2003)
- Haré+Guu DELUXE (2002–2003)
- Haré+Guu FINAL (2003–2004)
- Kujibiki Unbalance (2004–2005)
- Iriya no Sora, UFO no Natsu (2005)
- Genshiken (2006–2007)
- Urusei Yatsura: Obstacle Course Swim Meet (2008)
- Strawberry Marshmallow Encore (2009)
- Otome wa Boku ni Koishiteru: Futari no Elder (2012)
- Yuruyuri Nachuyasumi! (2015)

=== ONAs ===
- **Good Night World** (2023)
- **The Grimm Variations** (2024)

=== Live action TV ===
- Moero!! Robocon (1999)
- Tokusou Sentai Dekaranger (2004–2005)
- Mahou Sentai Magiranger (2005–2006)
- **Juken Sentai Gekiranger** (2007–2008)
- **Tensou Sentai Goseiger** (2010–2011)
- Mashin Sentai Kiramager (2020–2021)

== Books ==
=== Manga ===
- Mermaid Melody Pichi Pichi Pitch (original scenario, 2002–2005)

=== Novels ===
- Patlabor (2) Syntax Error
- Patlabor (3) Third Mission
- Patlabor (4) Black Jack Vol. 1
- Patlabor (5) Black Jack Vol. 2
