= Shinji Takamatsu =

Japanese film director (born 1961)

- 高松 信司
- Born: December 3, 1961 (age 64); Tochigi Prefecture, Japan
- Occupations: Storyboard artist, screenwriter, director

Shinji Takamatsu (高松 信司, Takamatsu Shinji; born December 3, 1961) is a Japanese storyboard artist, screenwriter, and director.

== Filmography ==
=== Director ===
- Mobile Suit SD Gundam's Counterattack (1989; director)
- The Brave Express Might Gaine (1993; director as "Tesaki Okuno" (握乃手紗貴))
- Brave Police J-Decker (1994; director, episode storyboard, episode director)
- The Brave of Gold Goldran (1995; director, episode storyboard, episode director)
- Mobile Suit Gundam Wing (1995; director [uncredited] from ep. 27 to ep. 49), episode storyboard)
- After War Gundam X (1996; director, episode storyboard)
- Kochira Katsushika-ku Kameari Kōen-mae Hashutsujo (1998; director from ep. 76 to ep. 338)
- Kochira Katsushika-ku Kameari Kōen-mae Hashutsujo The Movie (1999; director)
- Kochira Katsushika-ku Kameari Kōen-mae Hashutsujo The Movie 2: UFO Shūrai! Tornado Daisakusen!! (2003; director)
- School Rumble (2004; director, episode storyboard, episode director)
- Gin Tama OVA (2005; director)
- Ginban Kaleidoscope (2005; director, episode storyboard; as "Shinji Takamatsu" (タカマツシンジ))
- School Rumble: Extra Class (2005; director, episode storyboard, episode director)
- Gin Tama (2006; director from ep. 1 to 105; supervisor from ep. 106 to 201)
- School Rumble: Third Semester (2008; director)
- Sora no Manimani (2009; director, writer, episode storyboard)
- Gintama: The Movie (2010; director) — Prugio Citizen's Choice Award at the Puchon International Fantastic Film Festival
- Gintama' (2011; supervisor, recording production)
- Daily Lives of High School Boys (2012; director, writer, episode storyboard, sound director)
- Chō Soku Henkei Gyrozetter (2012, chief director, episode storyboard)
- Ixion Saga DT (2012, director, episode storyboard, sound director)
- Cute High Earth Defense Club LOVE! (2015; director, episode storyboard, episode director)
- Haven't You Heard? I'm Sakamoto (2016; director, writer, episode storyboard, sound director)
- Cute High Earth Defense Club LOVE! LOVE! (2016; director)
- Nanbaka (2016; director)
- Cute High Earth Defense Club LOVE! LOVE! LOVE! OVA (2017; director)
- Cute High Earth Defense Club HAPPY KISS! (2018; director, writer, episode storyboard, sound director)
- Grand Blue Dreaming (2018; director, writer, episode storyboard, episode director, sound director)
- RobiHachi (2019; director, storyboard, sound director)
- Teppen!!!!!!!!!!!!!!! Laughing 'til You Cry (2022; chief director)
- Astro Note (2024; chief director)
- Okaimono Panda! (2024; director, sound director)
- Cute High Earth Defense Club Eternal Love! (2025; director)
- Binan Kōkō Chikyū Bōei-bu Haikara! (2025; director, sound director)
- Grand Blue Dreaming 2nd Season (2025; director, writer, sound director)
- Grand Blue Dreaming 3rd Season (2026; director, writer, sound director)
- Happy Kanako's Killer Life (2027; director, writer)

=== Other ===
- Mobile Suit Zeta Gundam (1985; episode director; as "Tsumakata Jinshi" (妻方仁))
- Mobile Suit Gundam ZZ (1986; episode storyboard, episode director)
- Deat Heat (1987; episode director)
- Dirty Pair OVA (1987; episode storyboard, episode director)
- Metal Armor Dragonar (1987; episode storyboard)
- Armor Hunter Mellowlink (1988; episode storyboard, episode director)
- Mobile Suit Gundam: Char's Counterattack (1998; co-producer)
- Ronin Warriors (1988; opening and ending coordinator; episode storyboard, episode director)
- Mobile Suit Gundam 0080: War in the Pocket (1989; episode storyboard, episode director)
- Patlabor: The TV Series (1989; episode storyboard, episode director)
- Brave Exkaiser (1990; episode storyboard, episode director)
- Chibi Maruko-chan (1990; episode storyboard, episode director)
- Mobile Suit SD Gundam OVA (1990; episode storyboard, episode director)
- The Brave Fighter of Sun Fighbird (1991; episode storyboard, episode director)
- The Brave Fighter of Legend Da-Garn (1992; production chief; episode storyboard, episode director)
- Salad Jūyūshi Tomatoman (1992; episode storyboard, episode director)
- The King of Braves GaoGaiGar (1996; episode storyboard as "Tesaki Okuno")
- Ginga Hyōryū Vifam 13 (1998; episode storyboard, episode director)
- Japan Hikarian Railroad (1998; episode storyboard)
- Outlaw Star (1998; episode storyboard)
- Yu-Gi-Oh! Duel Monsters (2000; episode storyboard)
- Brigadoon: Marin & Melan (2001; episode storyboard)
- s-CRY-ed (2001; episode storyboard)
- Lightning Attack Express (2002; episode storyboard)
- AM Driver (2004; episode storyboard; as "Tesaki Okuno")
- Gintama: The Movie: The Final Chapter: Be Forever Yorozuya (2013; supervisor, recording production)
