= Kazutomi Yamamoto =

Japanese voice actor and singer

- 山本 和臣
- Born: January 3, 1988 (age 38); Hyōgo Prefecture, Japan
- Occupations: Voice actor, singer
- Years active: 2009–present
- Employer: amuleto
- Musical career
- Genre: J-pop
- Instrument: Vocals
- Years active: 2014–present
- Labels: Lantis (previous); Nippon Columbia
- Website: https://columbia.jp/artist-info/yamamotokazutomi/

Kazutomi Yamamoto (山本 和臣, Yamamoto Kazutomi; born January 3, 1988, Hyōgo Prefecture) is a Japanese voice actor and singer affiliated with amuleto. In 2013, he won the 7th Seiyu Awards as the Best Rookie actors along with Nobunaga Shimazaki.

== Voice acting roles ==
=== Anime television series ===
2009

- Seitokai no Ichizon as Yoshiki Nakameguro

2010

- Mitsudomoe as Yuudai Chiba

2011

- Is This a Zombie? as Fan (episode 12)
- Sekai Ichi Hatsukoi as Company Employee (episode 7), Moving Contractor (episode 2)
- Nichijou as Tsuyoshi Nakanojō
- Mitsudomoe Zōryōchū! as Yuudai Chiba
- Deadman Wonderland as Yamazaki

2012

- Another as Yuuya Mochizuki
- Mobile Suit Gundam AGE as Kio Asuno

2013

- Noucome as Touya Yoshiwara
- Majestic Prince as Claine
- Genshiken: Second Generation as Kenjiro Hato (as a male)
- Blood Lad as Mimic Yoshida
- Makai Ouji: Devils and Realist as Amon

2014

- Yona of the Dawn as Min-su
- Gugure! Kokkuri-san as Yamamoto-kun
- The Seven Deadly Sins as Young Gilthunder
- Haikyū!! as Mori (episode 1)
- Chaika - The Coffin Princess as Leonardo Stoller
- Future Card Buddyfight as Tetsuya Kurodake, Dancing Magician
- Love Stage!! as Kōsuke Sotomura

2015

- Rainy Cocoa, Welcome to Rainy Color as Noel Koga
- Cute High Earth Defense Club LOVE! as Yumoto Hakone
- Yurikuma Arashi as Life Beauty
- Dance with Devils as Loewen (dog)
- Future Card Buddyfight 100 as Tetsuya Kurodake

2016

- Shōnen Maid as Ibuki
- Cute High Earth Defense Club LOVE! LOVE! as Yumoto Hakone
- Touken Ranbu: Hanamaru as Midare Tōshirō
- D.Gray-man Hallow as Kiredori
- Nananin no Ayakashi – Chimi Chimi Mōryō!! Ima Monogatari as Cheruta
- Rainy Cocoa in Hawaii as Noel Koga

2017

- Kabukibu! as Katsumi Kazuma
- Beyblade Burst as Akira Yamabuki
- Natsume Yuujinchou Roku as Azuma
- Altair: A Record of Battles as Vasco

2018

- Gdgd Men's Party as Yomi
- Uchi no Oochopus as Kantarō
- Skull-face Bookseller Honda-san as Rabbit Head, E Company salesman
- RErideD: Derrida, who leaps through time as Graham
- Cute High Earth Defense Club HAPPY KISS! as Yumoto Hakone

2019

- The Magnificent Kotobuki as Allen
- Midnight Occult Civil Servants as Yuki
- Why the Hell are You Here, Teacher!? as Takashi Takahashi
- Ensemble Stars! as Sora Harukawa

2020

- Gleipnir as Isao Kasuga
- Mr. Osomatsu 3 as AI Robots

2021

- I-Chu: Halfway Through the Idol as Momosuke Oikawa
- Kuro-Gyaru ni Natta Kara Shinyū to Shite Mita, Shion Chihara
- Fairy Ranmaru as Bakkun
- How Not to Summon a Demon Lord Ω as Guryun

2022

- Lucifer and the Biscuit Hammer as Lance Lumiere
- Boruto: Naruto Next Generations as Konashi Nerikiri

2023

- Reign of the Seven Spellblades as Carlos Whitrow

2024

- Delusional Monthly Magazine as Jirō Tanaka
- Haigakura as Rabbit Mask

2025

- City the Animation as Obaba
- 9-Nine: Ruler's Crown as Yoichi Fukazawa

2026

- Goodbye, Lara as Kota

=== OVA ===
- Love Stage!! as Kōsuke Sotomura

=== Anime films ===
2025

- Cute High Earth Defense Club Eternal Love! as Yumoto Hakone

=== Video games ===
- Touken Ranbu as Midare Toushirou
- Ensemble Stars! as Sora Harukawa
- I-Chu as Momosuke Oikawa
- Sword Art Online: Fatal Bullet as ArFA-Sys
- Mega Man 11 as Block Man
- Genshin Impact as Dahlia

=== Dubbing ===
- Lab Rats as Leo Dooley (Tyrel Jackson Williams)
- Dark Skies as Jesse Barrett (Dakota Goyo)
- The Lego Movie 2: The Second Part as Finn (Jadon Sand)
- The Secret Life of Walter Mitty as Rich Melhoff (Marcus Antturi)
- West Side Story as Anybodys (Iris Menas)

== Discography ==
=== Single ===
Date Release	Title	Track list	Details
August 6, 2014	Click Your Heart!!	1. CLICK YOUR HEART!!; 2. PROMISE YOU...; 3. CLICK YOUR HEART!! (Instrumental); 4. PROMISE YOU...(Instrumental)	Product type: CD Label: Lantis (company) Click Your Heart!! used as the ending theme for the anime Love Stage!!
May 27, 2015	Soleil MORE	DISC 1: 1. Soleil MORE (ソレーユ・モア); 2. 309 light years 3. Soleil MORE (ソレーユ・モア Another ver.); 4. Soleil MORE (ソレーユ・モア Instrumental); 5. 309 light years (Instrumental); 6. Soleil MORE (ソレーユ・モア Another ver. Instrumental); ==== DISC 2 (Limited edition) ==== : 1. Soleil MORE (ソレーユ・モア PV); 2. Making of PV + Interview	Product type: CD Label: Nippon Columbia Soleil MORE used as the ending theme for the anime Triage X

=== Mini-album ===
Date Release	Title	Track list	Album details
February 10, 2016	White	1. Ever; 2. Soleil MORE (ソレーユ・モア); 3. Kyou wa Mou Nakanaide Oyasumi (今日はもう泣かないでおやすみ); 4. Nagarebushi Bebop (流れ星ビバップ); 5. 309 light years; 6. Key of Life	Product type: CD Label: Nippon Columbia
