= Mayuko Kazama =

Japanese voice actress

- 風間 万裕子
- Born: 2 October
- Occupation: Voice actress
- Years active: 2021–present
- Employer: I'm Enterprise
- Notable work: Gushing over Magical Girls as Sayo Minakami/Magia Azul; Baban Baban Ban Vampire as Aoi Shinozuka

Mayuko Kazama (Japanese: 風間 万裕子, Hepburn: Kazama Mayuko; born 2 October) is a Japanese voice actress from Tokyo, affiliated with I'm Enterprise. She has starred as Sayo Minakami/Magia Azul in Gushing over Magical Girls and Aoi Shinozuka in Baban Baban Ban Vampire.

== Biography ==
Mayuko Kazama, a native of Tokyo, was born on 2 October. She was educated at the Japan Narration Acting Institute. She joined I'm Enterprise on 1 April 2018.

She voiced Maina Atomika in 86 and Yui Yashiya in Rokudo's Bad Girls, as well as minor roles in Don't Toy with Me, Miss Nagatoro, Non Non Biyori Nonstop, Blue Lock, Fuuto PI, Sasaki and Miyano, Horimiya: The Missing Pieces, Oshi no Ko, and Rurouni Kenshin. In January 2024, she began starring as Sayo Minakami/Magia Azul in Gushing over Magical Girls. and voiced Hakua Igarashi in Kaiju No. 8 and a young Masachika Kuze in Alya Sometimes Hides Her Feelings in Russian; the same year, she had minor roles in 2.5 Dimensional Seduction, Dandadan, and Jellyfish Can't Swim in the Night. In 2025, she starred as Aoi Shinozuka in Baban Baban Ban Vampire, while voicing Madoka Inumiya in Chikuwa Senki and Miyako Honda in My Dress-Up Darling.

In May 2023, she became part of Marine Entertainment's voice acting unit ALiCE Eyez.

== Filmography ==
=== Television animation ===
Year	Title	Role	Ref.
2021	86	Maina Atomika	
2021	Cardfight!! Vanguard overDress	Employee #2	
2021	Don't Toy with Me, Miss Nagatoro	Art exhibition attendant	
2021	Non Non Biyori Nonstop	Akane's upperclassman	
2021	The Way of the Househusband	Boba yea passerby	
2022	Blue Lock	High school girl, Sae's opponent	
2022	Cardfight!! Vanguard will+Dress	Student, Mirei's aid	
2022	Fuuto PI	Nurse	
2022	Sasaki and Miyano	Kaede	
2023	Horimiya: The Missing Pieces	High school student	
2023	Insomniacs After School	Schoolgirl	
2023	My Love Story with Yamada-kun at Lv999	Girl	
2023	Oshi no Ko	Schoolgirl	
2023	Rokudo's Bad Girls	Yui Yashiya	
2023	Rurouni Kenshin	Azusa Arai, child, Rocke	
2023	Shy	Train announcer	
2024	2.5 Dimensional Seduction	High school student	
2024	Alya Sometimes Hides Her Feelings in Russian	Masachika Kuze (young), Seirei Academy student, customer	
2024	Dandadan	Elementary school boy	
2024	Gushing over Magical Girls	Sayo Minakami/Magia Azul	
2024	Kaiju No. 8	Hakua Igarashi	
2024	Jellyfish Can't Swim in the Night	High school girl	
2024	Solo Leveling	Hibiki Hayate	
2025	Babanba Banban Vampire	Aoi Shinozuka	
2025	Chikuwa Senki	Madoka Inumiya	
2025	Dealing with Mikadono Sisters Is a Breeze	Shogi reporter	
2025	Gachiakuta	Sphereite boy	
2025	My Dress-Up Darling	Miyako Honda	
2025	Rock Is a Lady's Modesty	Natsuki	
2025	Takopi's Original Sin	High School Student	
2025	Umamusume: Cinderella Gray	Meikun Tsukasa	
2025	You and Idol Pretty Cure	Wakaba Shinbashi, Koharu Mori, Cafe Glitter customer, Chikara, Kirakiland fairy, saleswoman, and townsperson	
2026	Anyway, I'm Falling in Love with You	Kuroda	
2026	Psyren	Sakurako Amamiya	

=== Animated film ===
Year	Title	Role	Ref.
2024	Given the Movie: Hiiragi Mix	Fan	
2024	The Colors Within	Student	

=== Video games ===
Year	Title	Role	Ref.
2021	The Legend of Heroes: Trails Through Daybreak	Kaela MacMillan	
2022	The Legend of Heroes: Trails Through Daybreak II	Kaela MacMillan	
2022	Tower of Fantasy	Yanuo	
2023	Gal Guardians: Demon Purge	Tsubasa Yomoyama	
2023	Street Fighter 6	Female avatar	
2024	Solo Leveling: Arise	Hibiki Hayate	
2024	Unicorn Overlord	Mercenary (Type D), Elma	
