= Babanba Banban Vampire =

Japanese manga and anime series

- First tankōbon volume cover

ババンババンバンバンパイア (Babanba Banban Banpaia)
- Genre: Comedy, yaoi
- Manga
- Written by: Hiromasa Okujima
- Published by: Akita Shoten
- English publisher: NA: Dark Horse Comics
- Imprint: Shōnen Champion Comics
- Magazine: Bessatsu Shōnen Champion
- Original run: October 12, 2021 – present
- Volumes: 14
- Anime television series
- Directed by: Itsuro Kawasaki
- Written by: Itsuro Kawasaki
- Music by: Jun Ichikawa
- Studio: Gaina
- Licensed by: Netflix (streaming rights)
- Original network: ANN (TV Asahi)
- Original run: January 11, 2025 – March 29, 2025
- Episodes: 12
- Live-action film
- Directed by: Shinji Hamasaki
- Written by: Yūko Matsuda
- Studio: Shochiku; TV Asahi
- Released: July 4, 2025
- Runtime: 105 minutes
- icon

Babanba Banban Vampire (Japanese: ババンババンバンバンパイア, Hepburn: Babanba Banban Banpaia) is a Japanese manga series written and illustrated by Hiromasa Okujima. It began serialization in Akita Shoten's shōnen manga magazine Bessatsu Shōnen Champion in October 2021. An anime television series adaptation produced by Gaina aired from January to March 2025, and a live-action film adaptation opened in Japanese theaters in July 2025.

== Plot ==
Ranmaru Mori, a 450-year-old vampire, lives and works at a long-established public bathhouse called Koi-no-Yu. Years earlier, when he was severely injured while being hunted by vampire hunters, his life was saved by a young boy named Rihito, the son of the bathhouse owners. Since then, Ranmaru has remained at the bathhouse as a live-in worker, secretly planning to one day drink Rihito's blood, which he believes will be at its best when Rihito becomes an 18-year-old virgin.

To preserve the "perfect" conditions for this plan, Ranmaru carefully watches over Rihito's life and tries to prevent him from getting into romantic or sexual relationships. However, when Rihito enters high school and falls in love with a classmate named Aoi, Ranmaru begins interfering in his daily life in order to stop their relationship from progressing. While trying to sabotage Rihito's chances at romance, Ranmaru must also hide his identity as a vampire and deal with other supernatural threats.

== Characters ==
Ranmaru Mori (森 蘭丸, Mori Ranmaru)
Voiced by: Daisuke Namikawa
Portrayed by: Ryo Yoshizawa
Rihito Tatsuno (立野 李仁, Tatsuno Rihito)
Voiced by: Yūsuke Kobayashi
Portrayed by: Rihito Itagaki
Aoi Shinozuka (篠塚 葵, Shinozuka Aoi)
Voiced by: Mayuko Kazama
Portrayed by: Nanoka Hara
Ken Shinozuka (篠塚 健, Shinozuka Ken) / Franken (フランケン, Furanken)
Voiced by: Taku Yashiro
Portrayed by: Mandy Sekiguchi
Nagayoshi Mori (森 長可, Mori Nagayoshi)
Voiced by: Yuichi Nakamura
Portrayed by: Gordon Maeda
Umetarō Sakamoto (坂本 梅太郎, Sakamoto Umetarō)
Voiced by: Katsuyuki Konishi
Portrayed by: Shinnosuke Mitsushima
Kaoru Yamaba (山羽 カオル, Yamaba Kaoru)
Voiced by: Akira Sekine

== Media ==
=== Manga ===
Written and illustrated by Hiromasa Okujima, Babanba Banban Vampire began serialization in Akita Shoten's shōnen manga magazine Bessatsu Shōnen Champion on October 12, 2021. The series' chapters have been compiled into fourteen tankōbon volumes as of August 2026.

In March 2026, Dark Horse Comics announced that they had licensed the series for English publication, with the first volume set to release in November later in the year.

No.	Original release date	Original ISBN	English release date	English ISBN
1	March 8, 2022	978-4-253-22973-9	November 10, 2026	978-1-506-75659-2
2	July 7, 2022	978-4-253-22974-6	—	—
3	November 8, 2022	978-4-253-22975-3	—	—
4	March 8, 2023	978-4-253-22976-0	—	—
5	July 6, 2023	978-4-253-22977-7	—	—
6	December 7, 2023	978-4-253-22978-4	—	—
7	March 7, 2024	978-4-253-22979-1	—	—
8	October 16, 2024	978-4-253-22980-7	—	—
9	December 16, 2024	978-4-253-29494-2	—	—
10	March 7, 2025	978-4-253-29495-9	—	—
11	June 7, 2025	978-4-253-29496-6	—	—
12	November 7, 2025	978-4-253-00887-7	—	—
13	April 8, 2026	978-4-253-01280-5	—	—
14	August 6, 2026	978-4-253-01883-8	—	—

=== Anime ===
An anime television series adaptation was announced on Garlic Day on February 29, 2024. It is produced by Gaina and directed and written by Itsuro Kawasaki, with assistant direction by Takahiro Tamano, characters designed by Yukiko Ban, and music composed by Jun Ichikawa. The series aired from January 11 to March 29, 2025, on the brand new IMAnimation programming block on TV Asahi and its affiliates. The opening theme song is "Bloody Liar", performed by Blue Encount, while the ending theme song is "Ne-Chu-Show", performed by Botchi Boromaru. Netflix streams the series globally.

==== Episodes ====
No.	Title	Directed by (Note: Production staff information is taken from the ending credits of each episode.)	Storyboarded by	Original release date
1	"The Vampire of the Public Bathhouse"; Transliteration: "Sentō no Kyūketsuki" (Japanese: 銭湯の吸血鬼)	Itsuro Kawasaki	Itsuro Kawasaki	January 11, 2025
2	"The Unpleasant Vampire"; Transliteration: "Fuyukai na Kyūketsuki" (Japanese: 不愉快な吸血鬼)	Takahiro Tamano	Itsuro Kawasaki	January 18, 2025
3	"Franken and the Vampire"; Transliteration: "Furanken to Kyūketsuki" (Japanese: フランケンと吸血鬼)	Itsuro Kawasaki	Itsuro Kawasaki	January 25, 2025
4	"The Vampire's Slumber Party"; Transliteration: "Zakone no Kyūketsuki" (Japanese: 雑魚寝の吸血鬼)	Takahiro Tomano	Itsuro Kawasaki; Takahiro Tamano	February 1, 2025
5	"The Vampire of Fate"; Transliteration: "Shukumei no Kyūketsuki" (Japanese: 宿命の吸血鬼)	Itsuro Kawasaki	Hiromitsu Kanazawa	February 8, 2025
6	"A Vampire Put on The Spot"; Transliteration: "Semarareru Kyūketsuki" (Japanese: 迫られる吸血鬼)	Takahiro Tomano	Hiromitsu Kanazawa	February 15, 2025
7	"The Cornered Vampire"; Transliteration: "Happō Fusagari no Kyūketsuki" (Japanese: 八方塞がりの吸血鬼)	Itsuro Kawasaki	Itsuro Kawasaki	February 22, 2025
8	"A Gal and the Vampire"; Transliteration: "Gyaru to Kyūketsuki" (Japanese: ギャルと吸血鬼)	Takahiro Tomano	Itsuro Kawasaki, Takahiro Tamano	March 1, 2025
9	"A Certain Family and the Vampire"; Transliteration: "Toaru Ikka to Kyūketsuki" (Japanese: とある一家と吸血鬼)	Itsuro Kawasaki	Hiromitsu Kanazawa	March 9, 2025 (Note: This episode aired at 12:00 a.m. JST, 30 mins after the original air time on TV Asahi.)
10	"Mr. Sakamoto and the Vampire"; Transliteration: "Sakamoto-sensei to Kyūketsuki" (Japanese: 坂本先生と吸血鬼)	Raita Sunaga	Itsuro Kawasaki	March 15, 2025
11	"Love, the Cross, and the Vampire"; Transliteration: "Koi to Jūjika to Kyūketsuki" (Japanese: 恋と十字架と吸血鬼)	Ryota Tamura	Ryota Tamura	March 22, 2025
12	"And Thus, A New Vampire"; Transliteration: "Soshite Arata Naru Kyūketsuki" (Japanese: そして新たなる吸血鬼)	Itsuro Kawasaki	Itsuro Kawasaki	March 29, 2025

=== Live-action film ===
A live-action film adaptation was also announced on Garlic Day on February 29, 2024. It is produced by Shochiku and TV Asahi, directed by Shinji Hamasaki and written by Yūko Matsuda. It was originally set to premiere in Japanese theaters on February 14, 2025, but was later delayed due to "various circumstances" related to Ranmaru's actor, Ryo Yoshizawa, and his 2024 trespassing incident. The film opened on July 4, 2025.

The film was also selected at the 24th New York Asian Film Festival, which was held from July 11 to July 27, 2025, for its North American Premiere.
