= I Want to Love You Till Your Dying Day =

Japanese yuri manga

- First tankōbon volume cover, featuring Sheena Totsuki (left) and Mimi Kagari (right)

きみが死ぬまで恋をしたい (Kimi ga Shinu made Koi o Shitai)
- Genre: Dark fantasy; Yuri
- Manga
- Written by: Aono Nachi
- Published by: Ichijinsha
- English publisher: NA: Kodansha USA
- Magazine: Comic Yuri Hime
- Original run: August 18, 2018 – present
- Volumes: 9
- Anime television series
- Directed by: Yasushi Tomoda
- Written by: Jukki Hanada
- Music by: Yukari Hashimoto; Michiru
- Studio: Roll2
- Licensed by: Crunchyroll
- Original network: AT-X, Tokyo MX, KBS Kyoto, SUN, BS11, WOWOW Prime
- Original run: July 7, 2026 – September 29, 2026
- Episodes: 13
- icon

I Want to Love You Till Your Dying Day (Japanese: きみが死ぬまで恋をしたい, Hepburn: Kimi ga Shinu made Koi o Shitai) is a Japanese yuri manga series written and illustrated by Aono Nachi. It was serialized in Ichijinsha's Comic Yuri Hime from August 2018 to December 2019, before moving to online serialization on both PixivYurihime and Ichijin Plus. Kodansha USA licensed the series for an English-language release. An anime television series adaptation produced by Roll2 aired from July to September 2026.

== Synopsis ==
At a school that takes in orphaned children and raises them to be magical weapons for war, one morning, a 14-year-old Sheena Totsuki suddenly loses her roommate. Sheena suppresses her grief and tries to act strong, until later that evening when a girl covered in blood approaches her. Despite her injuries, the girl remains cheerful, much to Sheena's confusion. The next day, the girl joins Sheena's class as a new student and introduces herself as Mimi Kagari, while Sheena finds out that Mimi is rumored to be the school's secret weapon as she is seemingly unable to die. The pair become roommates and grow closer despite their different outlooks on their situation within their school.

== Characters ==
Sheena Totsuki (トツキ シーナ, Totsuki Shīna)
Voiced by: Rie Takahashi (PV, anime)
A 14-year-old girl whose magic ability and grades are unremarkable. She hates war and hurting others, and has doubts about her mission within the school. She is the first student to meet Mimi and is disturbed by her cheerful disposition despite being covered in blood from the battlefield. She comes to learn more about Mimi once they are assigned as roommates.
Mimi Kagari (カガリ ミミ, Kagari Mimi)
Voiced by: Rina Hidaka (PV, anime)
A mysterious girl who met Sheena by chance after returning from the battlefield. Despite her young appearance and carefree mannerisms she is rumored to be the school's secret weapon that can never die. She possesses unimaginable power and has no hesitation in killing her enemies. She can revive herself even if she is injured in battle to the point where she no longer retains her human form.
Seiran Lidsey (リジィ セイラン, Rīji Seiran)
Voiced by: Asami Seto (PV, anime)
One of Sheena's classmates and friends. She is earnest and has a strong sense of justice. She is usually with her roommate and girlfriend, Ali.
Ali Maud (モード アリ, Mōdo Ari)
Voiced by: Yui Ishikawa (PV, anime)
Seiran's girlfriend, she's a classmate and friend of Sheena. She is always smiling and has a gentle personality. She has a tendency to speak her thoughts very direct and bluntly.
Before arriving at the orphanage, she was a waitress in a brothel.
Fran (フラン, Furan)
Voiced by: Yumi Uchiyama (anime)
The school nurse. She is skilled in healing magic. She looks after Mimi when she returns from battle, however since Mimi always comes back heavily injured, Fran is often annoyed with her.
Omi (オミ)
Voiced by: Ai Kayano (anime)
The teacher of class 14 at the school. A woman who wears glasses.
Nino Esther (エスタ 二ノ, Esuta Nino)
Voiced by: Haruka Shiraishi (anime)
A student from class 16 and a senior of Sheena and her friends. She is frequently seen with bandages and wraps from past injuries. Sheena and Mimi first saw Esther kissing her roommate on the stairs at school, however by the time they were properly introduced to Esther her roommate had since died in battle.
Halfred Anhalt (アンハルト・ハルフレズ, Anharuto Harufurezu)
Voiced by: Riho Sugiyama (anime)
Nicknamed Haru. A student in class 14, she is befriend by Mimi. She has a frank personality and suffers a weak physical condition, getting persistent fevers when in direct sunlight and thus cannot partake in mock-battles at school. She wears a boys uniform and while conflicted about her gender and romantic identity she is encouraged by Fran to take her time working it out.

== Media ==
=== Manga ===
Written and illustrated by Aono Nachi, I Want to Love You Till Your Dying Day was serialized in Ichijinsha's Comic Yuri Hime from August 2018 to December 2019, before moving to online serialization on both the PixivYurihime page on the Pixiv Comic website and Ichijin Plus. The series has been collected in nine tankōbon volumes as of July 2026.

The series is licensed for an English release in North America by Kodansha USA.

==== Volumes ====
No.	Original release date	Original ISBN	English release date	English ISBN
1	January 18, 2019	978-4-7580-7898-6	February 18, 2025	979-8-8887-7380-2
1. "Nice to Meet You" (はじめまして, Hajimemashite); 2. "Kiss" (キス, Kisu); 3. "I Am Me" (わたしはわたし, Watashi wa watashi); 4. "Yeah, It Hurts" (ちゃんと痛いと, Chanto itaito); 5. "The Immortal Girl" (死なない女の子, Shinanai on'nanoko)
2	July 18, 2019	978-4-7580-7964-8	April 15, 2025	979-8-8887-7381-9
6. "Friends" (ともだち, Tomodachi); 7. "Accomplices" (共犯, Kyōhan); 8. "An Enduring Tale" (お伽話の続き, O togibanashi no tsudzuki); 9. "You'll Understand One Day" (いつかわかるよ, Itsu ka wakaru yo); 10. "A Never-ending Night" (終わらない夜, Owaranai yoru)
3	July 31, 2020	978-4-7580-2147-0	June 10, 2025	979-8-8887-7382-6
11. "Welcome Back" (おかえり, Okaeri); 12. "Motive" (理由, Riyū); 13. "After the Tears" (涙のあと, Namidanoato); 14. "I'm Not Scared Anymore" (もう怖くないよ, Mō kowakunai yo); Bonus: "A Patch of Sunlight" (ひだまり, Hida mari)
4	June 30, 2021	978-4-7580-2267-5	August 12, 2025	979-8-8887-7383-3
15. "I'm Back" (ただいま, Tadaima); 16. "A Choice" (選択, Sentaku); 17. "My Magic" (わたしの魔法, Watashi no mahō); Bonus: "A Dream" (ゆめ, Yume); 18. "Still Unknown" (まだ知らない, Mada shiranai); 19. "An Unforgettable Day" (忘れない日, Wasurenai-bi)
5	April 30, 2022	978-4-7580-2399-3; 978-4-7580-2400-6 (SE)	October 14, 2025	979-8-8887-7384-0
20. "I'm Okay" (だいじょうぶ, Daijōbu); 21. "Innocence" (無垢, Muku); 22. "A Lost Child" (迷子の子供, Maigo no kodomo); 23. "On My Own" (わたしのままで, Watashi no mama de); 24. "I Want to See You" (会いたい, Aitai)
6	January 25, 2023	978-4-7580-2497-6	December 9, 2025	979-8-8887-7385-7
25. "Thank You" (ありがとう, Arigatō); 26. "Wound" (傷ロ, Kizu ro); 27. "A Sweet Fever" (甘い熱病, Amai netsubyō); 28. "Don't Cry" (泣かないで, Nakanaide); 29. "Forever Mine" (好きな人, Sukinahito)
7	February 29, 2024	978-4-7580-2648-2	February 10, 2026	979-8-8887-7660-5
30. "A Flicker" (またたき, Matataki); 31. "Hope" (希望, Kibō); 32. "What's Here With Us" (ここにあるもの, Koko ni aru mono); 33. "At the End of Our Days" (日々の果て, Hibi no hate); 34. "The Shape of Us" (二人のかたち, Futari no katachi); Bonus: "I Love You" (だいすき, Daisuki)
8	March 17, 2025	978-4-7580-2865-3	April 14, 2026	979-8-8887-7661-2
35. "From Here On Out" (これから, Korekara); 36. "A Promise" (約束, Yakusoku); 37. "Having a Dream" (夢をみる, Yume o miru); 38. "Reaching for You" (届かないの？, Todokanai no?); Bonus: "Wavering" (ゆらめき, Yurameki); Bonus: "I Remember" (おぼえてる, Oboe teru)
SS	January 29, 2026	978-4-7580-8938-8	—	—
1. Kirakira (きらきら); 2. Baibai (ばいばい); 3. Kurakura (くらくら); 4. Zukizuki (ずきずき); 5. Meromero (めろめろ); 6. Pikapika (ぴかぴか)
9	July 16, 2026	978-4-8251-0010-7	July 20, 2027	979-8-9007-4274-8
39. Owari made (おわりまで); 40. Mama (ママ); 41. Uso-tsuki (うそつき); 42. Watashi no koi (わたしの恋)

=== Anime ===
An anime television series adaptation was announced on March 2, 2025. It is produced by Roll2, with Takudai Kakuchi originally announced as the director of the series, that however, in February 2026, his credit was changed to "creative advisor". Yasushi Tomoda, originally Kakuchi's assistant director, replaced him as the director, with Nao Enomoto replacing Tomoda's position as assistant director. Jukki Hanada is handling series composition, Kyoko Yufu is designing the characters, and Yukari Hashimoto and Michiru are composing the music. The series aired from July 7 to September 29, 2026, on AT-X and other networks. The opening theme is "Amore" by ReoNa, while the ending theme is "Éternel" (エテルネル, Eteruneru; 'French for Eternal') by Sajou no Hana. Crunchyroll streamed the series.

==== Episodes ====
No.	Title	Directed by	Storyboarded by	Original release date
1	"The Kiss"; Transliteration: "Kisu" (Japanese: キス)	Minami Honma	Takudai Kakuchi	July 7, 2026
In a magical world caught in a state of constant warfare, pacifist Sheena Totsuki is informed of her roommate being killed in action. She laments her duty as a child soldier and struggles with her magic. One day, Sheena is confronted by a bloodied yet cheerful girl. The girl compliments Sheena's smell before being scolded and fetched by the school nurse Fran. Sheena is left unsettled as the girl, whose name is Mimi Kagari, joins her class and becomes her new roommate. Mimi becomes affectionate to a bewildered Sheena and learns about the school's traditions. Fellow classmates Ali Maud and Seiran Lidsey reveal to Sheena that Mimi is treated as the school's secret weapon. Mimi is summoned for a combat mission, leaving Sheena to wonder on her background. Sheena later moves Mimi's belongings to their dorm and encounters two girls kissing by the stairs, with Mimi also spying. Sheena explains to Mimi that the kiss is a form of healing magic which only works if two people share a special bond. Fascinated by its effectiveness, Mimi kisses Sheena's lips after seeing her poor health.
2	"It Does Hurt"; Transliteration: "Chanto Itai yo" (Japanese: ちゃんと痛いよ)	Yasushi Tomoda	Yasushi Tomoda, Takudai Kakuchi & Nao Enomoto	July 14, 2026
Sheena becomes flustered by her first kiss with Mimi and is unable to focus during class. Their teacher Omi schedules them for a mock battle, much to Sheena's displeasure of not wanting to kill. The next day, Omi leads the class to a battlefield and tasks them to kill three targets. The mock battle commences, where Mimi coldly demonstrates her skill as the school's secret weapon. Ali and Seiran work together to eliminate their targets while seeing Mimi effortlessly kill more. Sheena attempts to locate her first target when her arm is severed by an assassin. Mimi kills the assassin as Sheena is brought to Fran's infirmary to recover. Mimi kisses a pained Sheena on the mouth to restore her arm, surprising Ali and Seiran. After Sheena wakes up, Omi apologizes for placing them in danger before reminding Sheena and Mimi of their wartime situation. As Sheena and Mimi return to their dorm, Omi questions Fran on why she did not tell Sheena about Mimi's special recovery magic. Mimi discloses to Sheena on her loneliness and tendency to lose her limbs, allowing the two girls to connect. Mimi then admits she kissed her, leaving Sheena bashful.
3	"Friends"; Transliteration: "Tomodachi" (Japanese: ともだち)	Nao Enomoto	Nao Enomoto	July 21, 2026
Sheena has difficulty understanding Mimi upon seeing her status as a weapon and her playful personality. She confides in Ali and Seiran on her concerns, as Ali and Seiran share a rumor of her immortality. After parting ways, Ali confides in Seiran on her eagerness to see Sheena change with Mimi's presence. Later that night, Fran observes Mimi restore her own mutilated remains after carelessly dying in battle. Mimi reunites with Sheena, who apologizes to her for her distant attitude. Sheena requests they become friends, which Mimi gleefully accepts. The two girls spend their day off discussing what friends do, like revealing each other's secrets, and doing chores. Fran shows up to fetch Mimi for battle and confirms to Sheena on Mimi's immortality; Mimi voices discontent on being sent to several combat missions, as Fran reminds her of maintaining her secret. Sheena later welcomes Mimi's return, and Mimi secretly admits that her immortality is rooted on her being already dead, shocking Sheena.
4	"Accomplices"; Transliteration: "Kyōhan" (Japanese: 共犯)	Yū Aiba	Yasushi Tomoda & Nao Enomoto	July 28, 2026
Sheena is left troubled at Mimi's revelation while Omi spies on their conversation and later confronts Fran, who promises to handle it. In class, Omi teaches them about resurrection magic, a special but forbidden spell where one person sacrifices themselves to give another eternal life. Learning this, Sheena begins to suspect Mimi is a resurrected individual. Sheena and Mimi are then called to Fran's office, where Fran confirms to Sheena that Mimi was resurrected by her mother many years ago, adding that her immortality has been a crucial asset to the war effort. She then warns Sheena not to spread Mimi's secret. Meanwhile, the school faculty discuss the nation's war plans and the possibility of having to mobilize more students. Troubled by the escalating conditions and wary of Fran's motives with Mimi, Omi plans to accelerate her students' training. Ali and Seiran muse about what they would do with resurrection magic, while Sheena takes Mimi to a field of daisies near school. Realizing Mimi has mostly lived a secluded life, Sheena resolves to provide as much happiness to Mimi as she can.
5	"Endless Night"; Transliteration: "Owaranai Yoru" (Japanese: 終わらない夜)	Shunsuke Takahashi	Yuki Komada & Nao Enomoto	August 4, 2026
During a general cleaning of the school's facilities on Gratitude Day, Sheena wonders on the ability to break Mimi's resurrection spell. The two girls accomplish their cleaning duties and visit the school's bazaar. They meet a girl named Nino Esther, whom they recognize as the student kissing another girl by the stairs. Esther gives them a matching pair of dresses, voicing that she no longer needs them. Sometime later, Mimi returns to the dorm following a combat mission, and Sheena invites her to bathe together upon seeing her stained with blood. Sheena remains discomforted by Mimi's childlike innocence despite her circumstances, causing her to explain the stakes involved in war and the cost of taking a life. Sheena meets with Fran to discuss the possibility of undoing Mimi's immortality, but Fran retorts that the change would result in all the students, including Sheena herself, being sent to battle and certain death. Despite the precarious dilemma, Fran motivates Sheena to find something she wants to do for Mimi.
6	"Welcome Home"; Transliteration: "Okaeri" (Japanese: おかえり)	Minami Honma	Minami Honma	August 11, 2026
Sheena checks on Mimi at the infirmary after a combat mission and sees several wounded students being treated by Fran. Sheena then witnesses Mimi's bloodied but conscious remains restoring itself, leaving her to realize how much Mimi sacrifices herself for the student's lives. Recalling Fran's words, Sheena accompanies Mimi in making a flower crown, which Mimi admits on carrying around during combat to be reminded of her newfound joy. With their resources stretched thin and the faculty remaining resolute on mobilizing more students, Omi informs Seiran of her upcoming combat test against Mimi. The school begins to gossip about the duel, leaving Sheena and Ali to wonder how Seiran will handle it. Ali points out to Seiran that the duel will test her emotional mindset in battle, and Seiran insists she is prepared since surviving in the slums. Seeing Seiran's resolve, Ali eagerly assists in her training. Seiran bids Mimi luck for their duel, and Mimi promises to Sheena that she will do well.
7	"Not Afraid Anymore"; Transliteration: "Mō Kowakunai yo" (Japanese: もう怖くないよ)	Nao Enomoto	Nao Enomoto	August 18, 2026
Seiran struggles in matching Mimi's strength at their duel. Mimi prepares to cast a deadly spell, forcing Omi to call off the duel. Seiran rebukes Mimi for not putting her full effort, though Mimi states she does not want to hurt herself and worry Sheena, relating her situation to Seiran's relationship with Ali. Seiran reveals she fights to prevent Ali from being conscripted and asks Mimi what she is fighting for. Although Fran muses to Omi on using the duel as reason to cancel the mobilization, she is infuriated to learn Seiran volunteered to go to the frontlines anyways. Seiran is summoned for her first combat mission, as Ali kisses her and Fran orders her to stay alive. Seiran safely returns, but she opens up to Ali on gaining trauma from being forced to kill for the first time. Ali remarks that she was able to protect her loved ones and gifts her a locket containing her letters as a good-luck charm. At another mission, Seiran administers first aid to her allies until she is mortally wounded by an unseen assailant. Despite using up all her medicine and her deteriorating health, Seiran uses her remaining strength to reunite with Mimi before dying and disappearing, leaving behind Ali's locket.
8	"I'm Back"; Transliteration: "Tadaima" (Japanese: ただいま)	Yasushi Tomoda	Yasushi Tomoda	August 25, 2026
Mimi is welcomed by Sheena at school, who then learns of Seiran's death. After Omi informs the class of the news, Ali arranges Seiran's belongings in their dorm. Ali wistfully reminisces on spending several intimate moments with Seiran, including cuddling in bed, seeing if an intricate hair clip fits either of them, and applying matching ear piercings and toenail polish. With her future with Seiran prematurely cut off, Ali tries to cope with her newfound reality. Sheena and Mimi aid Ali on arranging Seiran's belongings, as Ali reassures them that she will be fine, much to their concern. Fran vents to Omi on her failure to stop Seiran, and Omi suggests they incite change within the school's system. At a funeral for the fallen students, Mimi returns the locket last held by Seiran to Ali, causing Ali to break into tears and wail in despair. A student later approaches Sheena and Ali to share of Seiran saving him with her medicine, easing Ali's pain. Mimi suddenly reveals she can resurrect Seiran from the dead, stunning both Ali and Sheena.
9	"My Magic"; Transliteration: "Watashi no Mahō" (Japanese: わたしの魔法)	Kyōhei Yamamoto	Kyōhei Yamamoto	September 1, 2026
Recalling her conversation with Seiran on resurrection magic, Ali declines Mimi's offer to respect Seiran's choice to risk her own life. Although Ali thanks her, Mimi grows frustrated at their circumstances as Sheena consoles her. Sheena worries on her disposition and resolves to continue staying by her side. After eating midnight snacks with Mimi, Sheena asks for Fran's guidance on her magic to help out the students in any way she can before they are mobilized for battle. After Sheena opens up on her ability to revive flowers, Fran remarks that Sheena has a rare form of healing magic drawn from her inner spirit, and she encourages her to improve it to expand her healing abilities to humans. Fran also muses that Mimi is drawn to Sheena due to her similarity to her mother, who was a powerful user of similar healing magic. Upon learning of their compatibility and remembering Seiran's compassion, Sheena grows determined to change her demeanor and hone her healing magic, as it strongly reacts to Sheena peacefully sleeping by Mimi's side.
10	"An Unforgettable Day"; Transliteration: "Wasurenai hi" (Japanese: 忘れない日)	Takuma Suzuki & Tomomori Mine	Yuki Komada	September 8, 2026
Mimi begins to grow frustrated when Sheena spends more time practicing her healing magic rather than with her. Mimi finds classmate Halfred Anhalt in the infirmary. Mimi learns about Halfred's indifference towards her own recurrent illnesses and standing, and Halfred nonchalantly comments on Mimi's usefulness compared to the other students before being aided by Sheena. Sheena and Mimi attend to a few errands and run into Halfred again. Mimi compliments Halfred's decision to wear boys' clothing despite being a girl, leaving Halfred surprised and relieved. Sheena later praises Mimi's straightforwardness, adding that her lack of biases and assumptions endears herself to Ali and Halfred. They head to the library to return Halfred's book when Sheena receives a scrape from falling. Sheena asks Mimi not to heal it with her magic out of a desire to not always depend on her, frustrating the latter. Mimi requests Sheena to return the promise of not hurting herself, and the two girls affectionately kiss to heal Sheena's wounds.
11	"Untarnished"; Transliteration: "Muku" (Japanese: 無垢)	Shunsuke Takahashi, Nao Enomoto, & Atsuo Yamai	Nao Enomoto & Atsuo Yamai	September 15, 2026
Sheena participates in another mock battle to become useful to her peers, even as she recalls the assassin ambushing her. Mimi voices her worries to Halfred on Sheena becoming hurt in battle like Seiran, further admitting she sees Sheena's weakness. Mimi completes several combat missions with no injuries and casualties, leading Sheena to believe that the war is cooling down. However, Fran and Omi remain aware that Mimi is hiding the true extent of the injuries she suffers while protecting the other students, with Omi pointing out that Sheena will discover the truth soon. Sheena is horrified to learn about Mimi's grave injuries from Esther and is left feeling deceived. Sheena insists on being able to help through improving her healing magic, but Mimi bluntly tells Sheena she is too weak to be useful in combat. The two girls then argue, forming a rift between them. Fran explains to Sheena that Mimi's pragmatic decision is supported by the faculty, though she motivates Sheena to continue convincing Mimi on not taking the burden by herself.
12	"As I Am"; Transliteration: "Watashi no Mama de" (Japanese: わたしのままで)	Tsumori Shindo	Nao Enomoto	September 22, 2026
Mimi hears of Ali's intention to give away Seiran's belongings on the next Gratitude Day, with Ali stating she will always cherish the memories she and Seiran made. Mimi vents to Ali on her recent argument with Sheena, and Ali remarks that disagreements are natural in a relationship. Sheena attempts to make amends when she learns that the retrieval of Mimi was disrupted by an enemy group, prompting Sheena to rescue Mimi by herself. Upon seeing Mimi, Sheena kisses her to heal her injuries in time for them to escape the enemies. After returning to school to recuperate, Sheena admits she is able to move forward as a person thanks to Mimi and remains determined to improve her magic to help her and their fellow classmates. Sheena and Mimi reach an agreement to support each other, allowing both girls to reconcile. The two decide to spend the following day doing leisurely activities, as Fran discusses to Omi on how Mimi meeting Sheena made her into a stronger and more informed individual.
13	"I Miss You"; Transliteration: "Aitai" (Japanese: 会いたい)	Yūka Aoki	Yūka Aoki	September 29, 2026
Ali, who continues to mourn Seiran's death, crosses paths with Esther, who asks about the status of Sheena and Mimi's relationship. Ali confides in her jealousy towards Sheena and Mimi's love for each other that forces her to recall the love she lost with Seiran. Ali silently cries at her inability to come to terms with her current circumstances. During a rainy day, Esther meets with Ali again to apologize for her insensitive remarks. Esther connects with Ali's struggles after she also lost her beloved roommate and girlfriend in battle, adding she gave her the courage to move forward. Ali is comforted by Esther surmising that Seiran carried the same thoughts, allowing her to open up on how she first loved Seiran on a rainy day. Esther accompanies Ali outside the school grounds, where Ali tearfully voices her gratefulness on befriending Sheena through Seiran's efforts. Ali also admits on putting up a front and aspires to continue living as the person Seiran loved. Esther supports Ali's renewed drive as they return to school, with Ali thanking her. Ali joins Sheena and Mimi for dinner and also thanks them, much to Sheena and Mimi's delighted confusion.

== Reception ==
I Want to Love You Till Your Dying Day was nominated for the 2019 Next Manga Award in the print manga category. It was also featured in MyAnimeList's 2024 "You Should Read This Manga" list within the Unique Art/Story category.

Tatsuya Kusunoki, editor of Bloom Into You at manga magazine Dengeki Daioh, praised the series for its setting.
