= Chikuwa Senki =

Japanese manga series

- Chikuwa Senki: Ore no Kawaii Chikyū Shinryaku
- First tankōbon volume cover

ちくわ戦記～おれのカワイイで地球侵略～
- Manga
- Written by: Bubu
- Published by: Cygames; Shogakukan
- Imprint: Cycomi x Ura Shōnen Sunday Comics
- Magazine: Cycomi
- Original run: January 29, 2024 – present
- Volumes: 6
- Anime television series
- Directed by: Satoshi Mizuno
- Written by: Satoshi Mizuno
- Music by: Morrigan
- Studio: Imagica Infos; Imageworks Studio
- Original network: tvk
- Original run: April 8, 2025 – June 24, 2025
- Episodes: 12

Chikuwa Senki: Ore no Kawaii Chikyū Shinryaku (ちくわ戦記～おれのカワイイで地球侵略～; lit. 'Chikuwa War Chronicles: My Cute Invasion of Earth') is a Japanese manga series written and illustrated by Bubu. It has been serialized online via Cygames' Cycomi manga website since January 2024. A "light anime" television series adaptation produced by Imagica Infos and Imageworks Studio aired from April to June 2025.

== Characters ==
Chikuwa (ちくわ)
Voiced by: Tomokazu Sugita
Madoka Inumiya (犬宮まどか, Inumiya Madoka)
Voiced by: Mayuko Kazama
Banjirō Inumiya (犬宮伴次郎, Inumiya Banjirō)
Voiced by: Mutsuki Iwanaka
Nene Inumiya (犬宮寧々, Inumiya Nene)
Voiced by: Rie Hikisaka
Geppler Alien (ゲップラー星人, Geppurā Hoshibito)
Voiced by: Shunichi Maki

== Media ==
=== Manga ===
Written and illustrated by Bubu, Chikuwa Senki: Ore no Kawaii Chikyū Shinryaku began serialization on Cygames' Cycomi manga website on January 29, 2024. The manga's chapters have been compiled into six tankōbon volumes as of June 2025.

=== Anime ===
A "light anime" television series adaptation was announced on March 17, 2025. The series is produced by Imagica Infos and Imageworks Studio and directed and written by Satoshi Mizuno, with Morrigan of WAVE composing the music. It aired on tvk from April 8 to June 24, 2025.
