= Roll2 =

Japanese animation studio

ROLL2 Inc.
- Native name: 株式会社ROLL2
- Romanized name: Kabushiki-gaisha ROLL2
- Type: Kabushiki gaisha
- Industry: Animation studio
- Founded: November 6, 2017
- Headquarters: Kichjoji Honcho, Musashino, Tokyo, Japan
- Website: www.roll2.co.jp

ROLL2 Inc. (Japanese: 株式会社ROLL2, Hepburn: Kabushiki-gaisha ROLL2) is a Japanese animation studio based in Musashino, Tokyo founded in November 2017.

== History ==
The studio was founded on November 6, 2017, by White Fox production assistant Kazuaki Ochi.

== Works ==
=== Television series ===
Title	Director(s)	First run start date	First run end date	Eps	Note(s)	Ref(s)
Love Is Indivisible by Twins	Motoki Nakanishi	July 10, 2024	September 25, 2024	12	Based on a light novel by Shihon Takamura.	
I Want to Love You Till Your Dying Day	Yasushi Tomoda	July 7, 2026	September 29, 2026	13	Based on a manga by Aono Nachi.	
Now That We Draw	Shunsuke Ishikawa	January 2027	TBA	TBA	Based on a manga by Kyu Takahata and Yuwji Kaba.	
Within the Villainess	Yoshihisa Iida	2027	TBA	TBA	Based on a light novel by Makiburo.	
