= Love Is Indivisible by Twins =

Japanese light novel series

- First light novel volume cover

恋は双子で割り切れない (Koi wa Futago de Warikirenai)
- Genre: Romantic comedy
- Light novel
- Written by: Shihon Takamura
- Illustrated by: Almic
- Published by: ASCII Media Works
- Imprint: Dengeki Bunko
- Original run: May 8, 2021 – present
- Volumes: 6
- Manga
- Written by: Shihon Takamura
- Illustrated by: Okari
- Published by: ASCII Media Works
- Imprint: Dengeki Comics Next
- Magazine: Comic Dengeki Daioh "g"
- Original run: April 27, 2022 – present
- Volumes: 3
- Anime television series
- Directed by: Motoki Nakanishi
- Written by: Michiko Yokote
- Music by: Kana Utatane
- Studio: Roll2
- Licensed by: Crunchyroll
- Original network: AT-X, Tokyo MX, SUN, KBS, BS NTV
- Original run: July 10, 2024 – September 25, 2024
- Episodes: 12
- icon

Love Is Indivisible by Twins (Japanese: 恋は双子で割り切れない, Hepburn: Koi wa Futago de Warikirenai), abbreviated as Futakire (ふたきれ), is a Japanese light novel series written by Shihon Takamura and illustrated by Almic. It began publication in May 2021 under ASCII Media Works' Dengeki Bunko imprint, with six volumes released as of July 2024. A manga adaptation illustrated by Okari has been serialized in ASCII Media Works' Comic Dengeki Daioh "g" magazine since April 2022, with its chapters collected into three tankōbon volumes as of August 2024. An anime television series adaptation produced by Roll2 aired from July to September 2024.

== Plot ==
The twin sisters Rumi and Naori Jingūji are both in love with their childhood friend Jun Shirosaki, and the three of them must navigate their complicated love triangle relationship.

== Characters ==
Jun Shirosaki (白崎 純, Shirosaki Jun)
Voiced by: Shogo Sakata
He has known Rumi and Naori since they moved in next-door when they were children. He is the top student in his grade, although he does not excel in athletics. He is fond of reading.
Rumi Jingūji (神宮寺 琉実, Jingūji Rumi)
Voiced by: Konomi Kohara (voice drama), Moeha Nochimoto (anime)
One of Jun's childhood friends and Naori's twin sister. She has short hair, in contrast to Naori. She has a tomboyish personality and is a member of the basketball club. She and Jun previously dated, but they broke up so that she would not interfere with Naori's own feelings for Jun.
Naori Jingūji (神宮寺 那織, Jingūji Naori)
Voiced by: Aoi Koga (voice drama), Maaya Uchida (anime)
One of Jun's childhood friends and Rumi's twin sister. Unlike Rumi, she has long hair. She is fond of otaku media. She has liked Jun for a long time and confessed to him during their third year of junior high school, even though he does not reciprocate.
Toyoshige Moriwaki (森脇 豊茂, Moriwaki Toyoshige)
Voiced by: Katsumi Fukuhara
Reira Asano (浅野 麗良, Asano Reira)
Voiced by: Misaki Ikeda
Ririsu Kamedake (亀嵩 璃々須, Kamedake Ririsu)
Voiced by: Yūko Ōno
Shiena Amamiya (雨宮 慈衣菜, Amamiya Shiena)
Voiced by: Kaori Ishihara

== Media ==
=== Light novel ===
Written by Shihon Takamura and illustrated by Almic, Love Is Indivisible by Twins began its publication on May 8, 2021, under ASCII Media Works' Dengeki Bunko imprint. As of July 2024, six volumes have been released.

No.	Japanese release date	Japanese ISBN
1	May 8, 2021	978-4-04-913732-3
2	August 6, 2021	978-4-04-913941-9
3	January 8, 2022	978-4-04-914140-5
4	July 8, 2022	978-4-04-914461-1
5	March 10, 2023	978-4-04-914821-3
6	July 10, 2024	978-4-04-915277-7

=== Manga ===
A manga adaptation illustrated by Okari began serialization in ASCII Media Works' Comic Dengeki Daioh "g" magazine on April 27, 2022. The first tankōbon volume was released on November 25, 2022. As of August 2024, three volumes have been released.

No.	Japanese release date	Japanese ISBN
1	November 25, 2022	978-4-04-914735-3
2	July 26, 2023	978-4-04-915163-3
3	August 27, 2024	978-4-04-915925-7

=== Anime ===
An anime television series adaptation was announced at the Dengeki Bunko 30th anniversary event in July 2023. It is produced by Infinite and animated by Roll2, with Motoki Nakanishi serving as the director, Michiko Yokote supervising the scripts, Mai Watanabe designing the characters, and Kana Utatane composing the music. The series aired from July 10 to September 25, 2024, on AT-X and other networks. The opening theme song is "Parallel na Heart" (パラレルなハート; lit. 'Parallel Heart'), performed by Maaya Uchida, while the ending theme song is "Honey Citron" (ハニーシトロン), performed by Moeha Nochimoto and Uchida. Crunchyroll licensed the series.

==== Episodes ====
No.	Title	Directed by	Written by	Storyboarded by	Original release date
1	"Let's End It Tonight"; Transliteration: "Kyō de Owari ni Shiyō" (Japanese: 今日で終わりにしよう)	Motoki Nakanishi	Michiko Yokote	Yūko Horikawa & Kyōhei Maruyama	July 10, 2024
As young children, Jun Shirasaki meets his new neighbors, fraternal twins Naori and Rumi Jinguji, and they become very close friends. Jun enjoys learning and reading advanced level books, as does Naori and over time begin spending more time together while Rumi, who is more interested in sports, spends more time by herself. Despite this, Rumi harbors an intense love for Jun and jealousy of his closeness to Naori. By the time they are in middle school, Rumi impulsively asks Jun to be her boyfriend and convinces him to accept. However, straight away she feels deep guilt at stealing him from Naori and asks Jun to keep their relationship a secret. Over several months, their relationship grows, but Rumi cannot handle the guilt and breaks up with him. During the same time period Naori, being smarter than average, struggled to mix with her peers and suffered some bullying until Jun helped her make friends. Despite her own feelings for Jun, she was always aware Rumi was in love with him and so never confessed to Jun herself, even supporting Rumi in keeping her relationship with Jun secret from their classmates. When Rumi breaks up with Jun seemingly for no reason, Naori is confused and angry.
2	"If I Were to Be Asked Out"; Transliteration: "Moshi Kokuhaku Sareru Koto ga Attara" (Japanese: もし告白されることがあったら)	Yasushi Tomoda	Michiko Yokote	Yūko Horikawa & Kyōhei Maruyama	July 17, 2024
Following their breakup, it is revealed that Rumi had asked Jun to date Naori instead, feeling they were better suited for each other. Several weeks go by over summer break and Rumi regrets their break up whilst also being frustrated Jun has not yet asked Naori to be his girlfriend. Eventually she confronts him in his bedroom, but Jun is not over Rumi and they almost kiss, but once again Rumi rejects him and demands he date Naori. Jun eventually invites Naori to the movies and they enjoy spending the day together, culminating in Jun asking her to be his girlfriend. Despite teasing him, Naori accepts and they start dating. Naori tells Rumi straight away she is now dating Jun and Rumi pretends to be happy for them so Naori will not feel guilty, but inside she is still deeply unhappy at giving Jun away. That same day, Jun and Naori share their first kiss in his room.
3	"You Never Once Told Me You Loved Me"; Transliteration: "Ichido mo Suki tte Iwaretenai" (Japanese: 一度も好きって言われてない)	Fumito Yamada	Michiko Yokote	Tetsuya Miyanishi	July 24, 2024
Rumi's friend Reira thinks Rumi should put her own feelings first instead of feeling guilty. Naori talks Jun into a movie marathon on the next weekend with Jun's friend Toyoshige. Naori also goes to karaoke with her classmate Ririsu. While at Toyoshige's house he tells Jun he has a crush on Naori and even confessed to her once but was rejected. Now she is dating Jun he has moved on, except for the erotic movie collection he has of an adult actress who greatly resembles Naori. Jun admits feeling guilty; he knows both girls love him but still has feelings for Rumi despite now dating Naori. Rumi sprains her wrist in basketball and, fearing it has ruined her chances to join the team, locks herself in her room. She only relents when Jun is able to comfort her and they almost kiss again, but are interrupted by Naori, who suspects what almost happened and decides not to confront them. Later, Toyoshige tells Naori, despite what she believes, she was Jun's first crush, not Rumi. Jun tells Rumi he is still in love with her and regrets not saying it when they were dating. Rumi confesses she has been keeping a secret from him.
4	"Anything You Want"; Transliteration: "Suki ni Shite Ii nda yo" (Japanese: 好きにしていいんだよ)	Ōri Yasukawa	Michiko Yokote	Ōri Yasukawa	July 31, 2024
Jun admits his initial attraction to Naori was academic rivalry, but when he realized she was not competing like he was, he became happy being her friend. Rumi is happy she had Jun to herself for a little while, but is sure he will be happier with Naori. Naori asks Jun on a date and resists Ririsu's suggestion she wear lingerie. Rumi is concerned when Naori starts watching Rom-Coms, but Naori is adamant she has no intention of having sex. The date goes well so they plan to ride the ferris wheel. At the same time, Rumi plays in a basketball tournament, but her team does badly, only coming 5th place. Wind blows up Naori's skirt, exposing she wore a thong, and though she scolds Jun for peeking, she is secretly pleased it aroused him. Rumi becomes worried about Jun and Naori when Reira tries to ask her advice about sexual problems with her own boyfriend. While on the ferris wheel, Naori reveals she fell in love with him when he was trying to compete with her, but was afraid to tell him. Jun admits to his own cowardice as well. The next day, Naori attempts to have sex with Jun, but even though they are dating, he refuses from guilt. Naori shares her opinion that, by her definition, they are not really dating.
5	"Easily Swayed"; Transliteration: "Nagasareru Tokoro ga Aru kara ne" (Japanese: 流されるところがあるからね)	Minami Honma	Michiko Yokote	Minami Honma, Yūko Horikawa & Kyōhei Maruyama	August 7, 2024
Naori claims when Jun asked her out she never actually said “Yes” or “No”, so they are not dating yet. She also knows he still loves Rumi. Jun is hurt Naori knew everything and has been playing mind games with him and Rumi the whole time. As he is technically single, she offers him a choice; start their relationship over from scratch or go back to Rumi. Due to his confusion, Jun delays choosing, though this pleases Naori too as being part of a love-triangle will allow her and Rumi to compete as equals. She later has an honest conversation with Rumi, revealing everything and criticizing Rumi's decision to dump Jun for her sake. Angered that she knew all along and was manipulating her, Rumi tells Naori she should have never felt guilty about stealing Jun from her. Following their argument, they agree to stop considering each other's feelings as twins and treat each other like two women in love with the same man. Naori also warns she will be trying her hardest to seduce Jun again so if Rumi loves Jun, she will need to be proactive in winning his heart herself. Toyoshige yells at Jun for his cowardice in not choosing who to date, leaving both girls uncertain and upset, then in true Toyoshige manner tells Jun to just pick the twin he most wants sex with. Jun decides not to date either of them for a while. Ririsu warns Naori if she keeps causing trouble she will only push Jun and Rumi closer together, though Naori remains confident she will win.
6	"Until the Make-Ups"; Transliteration: "Ma, Tsuishi Made Yoroshikutte Koto de" (Japanese: ま、追試までよろしくってことで)	Kyōhei Yamamoto	Naoki Hayashi	Kyōhei Yamamoto	August 14, 2024
After scoring higher than her in an exam, Naori tricks Jun into hugging her where Rumi can see them, causing Rumi to request a hug too. Rumi is worried when beautiful student and professional model Amamiya wants Jun to tutor her. Jun tries to refuse but Amamiya does not listen and asks to meet later. With the twins birthday approaching, Ririsu plans to help Naori celebrate it. Jun asks Ririsu to keep Naori away while he and Rumi talk to Amamiya. Rumi is embarrassed to learn her basketball team all knew about her and Jun despite trying to keep it secret, including that they kissed on the stairs to the roof. As her parents are absent, Amamiya invites Jun and Rumi to her house to discuss the tutoring over dinner. Naori figures out something is going on and learns about Amamiya from Toyoshige, though she is confident Jun will not be attracted to Amamiya's airhead personality. Naori later catches Jun and Rumi returning from Amamiya's home and is astounded that, against her prediction, Jun has agreed to tutor Amamiya until she sits her make-up exam.
7	"She Already Likes Someone. And..."; Transliteration: "Tabun, Hoka ni Suki na Hito ga Iru. Soshite" (Japanese: 多分、他に好きな人がいる。そして)	Fumito Yamada	Naoki Hayashi	Moe Katō	August 21, 2024
Naori threatens to attend all tutoring sessions but relents after Jun insists he has no interest in Amamiya. Amamiya is late to the first session even though it is at her apartment, then delays further by showering. While out with her teammates, Rumi spots Naori wandering aimlessly. Realizing she is lonely with both her and Jun busy, she invites Naori to join them. Jun is irritated when Amamiya emerges in just underwear, then insists on talking about romance. She confesses to having a crush on an intelligent classmate, while Jun only admits he dated Rumi. Naori shares her worry over Amamiya with Rumi. Jun ends up seeing Amamiya's room and is amazed she is a secret otaku. The next day, with the twin's birthday approaching, Amamiya helps Jun shop for Rumi's gift as he already has Naori's. Naori, out shopping with Ririsu, spots them together. Despite Rumi's belief, Amamiya has a crush on someone else. Naori stubbornly attends their next tutoring session. Surprisingly, Amamiya is thrilled to see her. Naori exhausts herself playing with the cat and falls asleep. Amamiya's mother Shiho, a fashion designer, arrives home excited Amamiya's father has returned to Japan. Naori feels slightly better about Amamiya and holds Jun's hand while walking home together.
8	"I Thought About You So Much"; Transliteration: "Kangaete, Ippai Ippai Kangaete" (Japanese: 考えて、いっぱいいっぱい考えて)	Minami Honma	Naoki Hayashi	Minami Honma	August 28, 2024
As Rumi has an important basketball game, Jun gives her birthday present a day early; a new water bottle. Rumi kisses him, claiming it is for good luck. Feeling slightly guilty, she tells Naori she met Jun but keeps the kiss secret. Naori pretends not to care. Amamiya starts her make-up exams and is confident she will succeed. Jun gives Naori her present; a seal plushie and a case for her glasses. Naori becomes emotional and confesses she knows he gave Rumi her gift first even though their birthdays are on the same day. Naori scolds Jun for keeping secrets and asks him to pay attention to her from now on. Jun agrees to be more careful about treating them equally. Naori tells Ririsu she plans to start a new school club and manipulate Jun into joining with her. Amamiya arrives with gifts for Naori and Rumi; necklaces she designed and had made by her mother's jewellery company. Amamiya and Ririsu confess they actually planned Amamiya needing a tutor in order to help Amamiya become friends with Naori. Rumi makes the winning shot in her match and qualifies to play an even more important match the next day. Overnight Rumi cannot sleep so Naori tells her to go see Jun so she will feel better. After Rumi goes, Naori reveals it was her final kindness to Rumi as she is determined to win Jun's heart and will no longer be playing fair.
9	"You Wanted Him to Stop You"; Transliteration: "Tomete Hoshikatta kedo, Tomete Kurenakatta" (Japanese: 止めてほしかったけど、止めてくれなかった)	Shun Nagasawa & Fujisuke	Michiko Yokote	Hiroyuki Fukushima	September 4, 2024
Rumi and her team lose the next match, for which Rumi blames herself. During this time, Mizuma Sakaguchi, from the boys basketball team, unexpectedly confesses to her. Naori manages to convince Jun to form a pop-culture research club with Ririsu, Toyoshige and Amamiya. Even after learning Rumi is in love with Jun, Mizuma still asks her on a date and gives her time to consider her answer. Reira suspects Mizuma deliberately upset Rumi before asking her out so she would be vulnerable and more likely to say yes. Exasperated, she tells Rumi to start taking beating Naori seriously before she loses Jun without having tried at all. Naori decides not to tell Rumi about the club just yet. After talking with Reira, Rumi rejects Mizuma but eventually agrees to spending time together as platonic friends. Jun discovers the club room they requested has also been requested by the recreational board games club and it is uncertain who will get the room. Rumi tells Jun about maybe spending time with Mizuma and is upset when he leaves the decision up to her, instead of becoming jealous and asking her to avoid Mizuma, like she secretly wanted him to. Naori comforts her, then abruptly tells her she should go and spend time with Mizuma.
10	"Isn't My Queen Defenseless?"; Transliteration: "Watashi no Kuīn, Tore Sō ja Nai?" (Japanese: 私のクイーン、取れそうじゃない？)	Kyōhei Yamamoto	Naoki Hayashi	Kyōhei Yamamoto	September 11, 2024
Rumi starts avoiding Jun. Jun challenges Maple, the board game club leader, for the clubroom with a game of chess and if he loses Jun will join their club instead as they currently do not have enough members. Maple agrees but chooses Naori as his opponent. As she has not played in years, Naori demands Jun spend two days helping her practice. Naori tells Rumi that she was being unfair with how she handled things with Jun and that she told to spend time with Mizuma cause she wanted to see how Jun would react. Rumi continues to be indecisive about Mizuma as she is unsure how she wants Jun to react. Rumi's teammate Mai reveals she briefly dated Mizuma, but he dumped her due to liking Rumi. Realizing this, Rumi decides to reject Mizuma and tell him to take Mai back. After their chess lesson, Naori asks to spend the night in his room, but he sends her home. Rumi finally talks to Jun and learns about the club. Jun admits he does not want her to see Mizuma, but as Mizuma is his friend too, he felt guilty feeling that way and decided not to interfere. Rumi apologizes for putting him in the spot. Rumi arranges a date with Mizuma, and she also observes the next chess lesson and the three end up laughing together like when they were children. On the day of the chess match. Rumi sets off to meet Mizuma. Jun is disturbed when Mizuma suddenly messages him to tell him he is serious about liking Rumi.
11	"I'm Happy Just Knowing You Care"; Transliteration: "Chanto Kangaete Kureteru tte Wakatta Dake de, Watashi wa Jūbun" (Japanese: ちゃんと考えてくれてるってわかっただけで、私は十分)	Ryōtarō Iyo & Motoki Nakanishi	Michiko Yokote	Yūko Horikawa & Kyōhei Maruyama	September 18, 2024
Naori sees the message and tells Jun to go deal with it. Jun kisses her on the cheek, though she kisses him back on the lips. Mizuma accepts he does not have a chance with Rumi and explains he cannot take Mai back as he has no feelings for her. Maple turns out to be an intellectual like Naori and enjoys their conversation so he gives them the clubroom regardless of who wins. Jun finds Rumi and Mizuma at the park. Mizuma urges him to say what he really feels. Jun tells Rumi the reason he cannot choose between her and Naori is because he loves them both. Despite knowing it is selfish, he asks Rumi for more time to choose. Rumi agrees while Mizuma is exasperated by his selfish indecision. Naori wins her chess match, but feels uneasy Jun is still with Rumi. Later, at home Rumi and Jun learn Naori is having a sleepover with Amamiya. This makes Rumi suspicious and Jun disappointed as he wanted to tell Naori what he told Rumi. Amamiya and Ririsu deduce from her behavior Naori is planning to go all in by seducing Jun, as she leaves the sleepover to go after Jun. Meanwhile, while shopping for dinner, Jun and Rumi hold hands. Jun eventually returns home, but finds Naori outside his house asking to stay the night.
12	"My Feelings Right Now"; Transliteration: "Boku no Ima no Kimochi o" (Japanese: 僕の今の気持ちを)	Yoshitaka Nagaoka	Michiko Yokote	Yūko Horikawa & Kyōhei Maruyama	September 25, 2024
Despite his uncertainty, he allows Naori to sleep over. Jun is shocked when she joins him in the bath naked. He leaves before anything happens, upsetting her. Naori recalls a conversation with Toyoshige where he questioned whether she only loves Jun because Rumi dated him first. Certain that she loves him, she convinces Jun to share a bed. Jun refuses to have sex with her behind Rumi's back and after kissing her only once they go to sleep. The next day, Toyoshige is exasperated Jun does not just date Naori given their similar interests, but Jun feels he cannot just forget the year he spent dating Rumi. Out of nowhere, their parents announce a joint family trip, making Jun nervous as it means staying overnight with both girls. On the trip, Rumi and Naori bicker between themselves until it causes a huge argument, with both girls blaming each other for their actions, with Naori blaming Rumi for asking Jun out in the first place, while Rumi accuses Naori of manipulating her feelings. After slapping each other, they get into a physical fight that Jun breaks up, though he is accidentally slapped by both of them. Jun reiterates that he cannot pick one of them as it would mean breaking the others heart, so even though it hurts all three of them, he will not choose and tells them both to wait until he make his decision. Both girls resign themselves to competing for his heart as they return to school, to their friends' considerable exasperation.

== See also ==
- A Nobody's Way Up to an Exploration Hero, another light novel series with the same illustrator
