= Power of Hope: PreCure Full Bloom =

2023 Japanese anime television series

- Key visual
- Japanese: キボウノチカラ～オトナプリキュア'23～
- Revised Hepburn: Kibō no Chikara: Otona Purikyua 23
- Genre: Magical girl
- Creator: Izumi Todo
- Director: Takayuki Hamana
- Series composition: Yoshimi Narita
- Character designers: Akira Inagami (original); Toshie Kawamura (original); Atsuko Nakajima
- Music: Naoki Satō
- Country of origin: Japan
- Original language: Japanese
- No. of episodes: 12

Production
- Sound director: Miho Sugawara
- Art director: Miho Kawakami
- Cinematographer: Akira Shimozaki
- Color designer: Yui Azumi
- Editor: Keiko Onodera
- Animation producers: Takaharu Kado; Yoshifumi Nakata
- Studios: Toei Animation; Studio Deen
- Producers: Aki Murase; Kanako Toda; Kenichiro Naesiro; Rika Tone; Haruhisa Oya; Takumi Kohama
- Production companies: Power of Hope-Otona Precure Production Committee

Original release
- Network: NHK Educational TV
- Release: October 7 – December 23, 2023

Related
- Preceded by
- PreCure Splash Star (2006–2007); Yes! PreCure 5 (2007–2008); Yes! PreCure 5 GoGo! (2008–2009)

Power of Hope: PreCure Full Bloom (Note: Japanese: キボウノチカラ～オトナプリキュア'23～, Hepburn: Kibō no Chikara: Otona Purikyua 23; lit. "Power of Hope: Grown-Up Pretty Cure 23") is a 2023 Japanese anime television series based on the Pretty Cure franchise created by Izumi Todo. The story is a continuation of Yes! PreCure 5 and its sequel Yes! PreCure 5 GoGo!, which both originally aired between 2007 and 2009, its prior 2006 series, PreCure Splash Star, and focuses on an adult Nozomi Yumehara and her friends. The series is directed by Takayuki Hamana at both Toei Animation and Studio Deen, written by Yoshimi Narita, character designed by Atsuko Nakajima from a co-original character concept by Akira Inagami and Toshie Kawamura, and music composed by Naoki Satō. The series aired on NHK Educational TV between October 7 and December 23, 2023.

== Story ==
The series takes place years after the events of Yes! PreCure 5 GoGo!, PreCure Splash Star, and Pretty Cure Max Heart. It focuses on Nozomi Yumehara and her friends, who once fought as Pretty Cure and are now adults working towards their dreams. When a mysterious figure named Bell causes creatures called Shadows to appear from the shadows of people, strange flowers called Time Flowers allow Nozomi and the others to turn younger and once again transform into Pretty Cures. Joined by Saki and Mai, who were also Pretty Cure, Nozomi and the others fight the Shadows and Bell while investigating their origin.

== Characters ==
=== Yes! PreCure 5 and GoGo! characters ===
Nozomi Yumehara (夢原 のぞみ, Yumehara Nozomi) / Cure Dream (キュアドリーム, Kyua Dorīmu)
Voiced by: Yūko Sanpei
The main protagonist who once fought as Cure Dream. She works as an elementary school teacher at Plaisir Academy.
Rin Natsuki (夏木 りん, Natsuki Rin) / Cure Rouge (キュアルージュ, Kyua Rūju)
Voiced by: Junko Takeuchi
Nozomi's best friend who once fought alongside her as Cure Rouge. She works as an accessory designer while pursuing soccer as a hobby.
Urara Kasugano (春日野 うらら, Kasugano Urara) / Cure Lemonade (キュアレモネード, Kyua Remonēdo)
Voiced by: Mariya Ise
One of Nozomi's friends who once fought alongside her as Cure Lemonade. She is working in theater.
Komachi Akimoto (秋元 こまち, Akimoto Komachi) / Cure Mint (キュアミント, Kyua Minto)
Voiced by: Ai Nagano
One of Nozomi's friends who once fought alongside her as Cure Mint. She is trying to become a novelist.
Karen Minazuki (水無月 かれん, Minazuki Karen) / Cure Aqua (キュアアクア, Kyua Akua)
Voiced by: Ai Maeda
One of Nozomi's friends who once fought alongside her as Cure Aqua. She is working as a doctor.
Milk (ミルク, Miruku) / Kurumi Mimino (美々野 くるみ, Mimino Kurumi) / Milky Rose (ミルキィローズ, Mirukī Rōzu)
Voiced by: Eri Sendai
A rabbit-like fairy from Palmier Kingdom, known in her fairy form as Milk, who gained a human form and fought alongside the Pretty Cure as Milky Rose. She currently works as a temp secretary.
Coco (ココ, Koko) / Kouji Kokoda (小々田 コージ, Kokoda Kōji)
Voiced by: Takeshi Kusao
A fox-like fairy and the prince of Palmier Kingdom.
Natts (ナッツ, Nattsu) / Natsu (夏さん, Natsu-san)
Voiced by: Miyu Irino
A squirrel-like fairy from the Palmier Kingdom.
Syrup (シロップ, Shiroppu) / Shiroh Amai (甘井 シロー, Amai Shirō)
Voiced by: Romi Park
A bird-like fairy from the Donut Kingdom.
Bunbee (ブンビー, Bunbī)
Voiced by: Wataru Takagi
A man who initially opposed the Yes! 5 team, working for Nightmare and then Eternal. He can transform into a form resembling a humanoid bumblebee. Following the events of the series, he opened a handyman agency.
Madoka Akimoto (秋元 まどか, Akimoto Madoka)
Voiced by: Ai Nagano
Komachi's older sister.
Sakamoto "Jii-ya" (坂本 〈じいや〉, Sakamoto "Jiiya)
Voiced by: Tomoaki Ikeda
The trusted butler of the Minazuki family. He has worked for them for a long time and takes care of the villa where Karen lives.
Kazuyo Natsuki (夏木 和代, Natsuki Kazuyo)
Voiced by: Mayumi Asano
Rin's mother who runs a flower shop called "Fleuriste Natsuki".

=== PreCure Splash Star characters ===
Saki Hyuga (日向 咲, Hyūga Saki) / Cure Bloom (キュアブルーム, Kyua Burūmu)
Voiced by: Orie Kimoto
A girl who once fought alongside Mai as Cure Bloom and Cure Bright. She currently works as a baker for her family's bakery, Panpaka Pan. She is engaged to a man she met at culinary school.
Mai Mishou (美翔 舞, Mishō Mai) / Cure Egret (キュアイーグレット, Kyua Īguretto)
Voiced by: Atsuko Enomoto
A girl who once fought alongside Saki as Cure Egret and Cure Windy. She has loved drawing since she was in middle school. She got engaged to a man, but has since broken up with him.
Michiru Kiryuu (霧生 満, Kiryū Michiru) & Kaoru Kiryuu (霧生 薫, Kiryū Kaoru)
Voiced by: Yuriko Fuchizaki and Akemi Okamura
Former enemies of Saki and Mai, who were originally created by Dark Fall to defeat the Pretty Cures but eventually became their friends and allies. They have since become video streamers, Night (ナイト, Naito) and Light (ライト, Raito), using their Dark Night Light channel to report on the locations of Shadows and spread awareness of things that bring them joy.
Kenta Hoshino (星野 健太, Hoshino Kenta)
Voiced by: Junko Takeuchi
Saki's childhood friend. In middle school, he formed a comedy duo with his classmate Miyasako, since he loves making jokes. His parents work as fishers. He opened a coffee bar together with Yuko, with whom he married and had a son.
Yuko Hoshino (星野 優子, Hoshino Yūko)
Voiced by: Masako Jō
Saki's friend and softball teammate in middle school, whose original name was Yuko Ota (太田優子, Ota Yuko). She married and had a child with Kenta, whom she was in love with.

=== Pretty Cure Max Heart characters ===
Nagisa Misumi (美墨 なぎさ, Misumi Nagisa) / Cure Black (キュアブラック, Kyua Burakku)
Honoka Yukishiro (雪城 ほのか, Yukishiro Honoka) / Cure White (キュアホワイト, Kyua Howaito)
Hikari Kujou (九条 ひかり, Kujō Hikari) / Shiny Luminous (シャイニールミナス, Shainī Ruminasu)
Voiced by: Yōko Honna (Nagisa), Yukana (Honoka), and Rie Tanaka (Hikari)
The trio who preceded Nozomi and the others as Pretty Cures and join them in the final battle against the Shadows.
Sanae Yukishiro (雪城 さなえ, Yukishiro Sanae)
Voiced by: Masako Nozawa
Honaka's grandmother whom Komachi holds interviews about the history of the town with.

=== Villains ===
Bell (ベル, Beru)
Voiced by: Yoko Hikasa
A mysterious villain who believes that time cannot be stopped. She has the power to amplify peoples' negative emotions and summon monsters called Shadows. Bell is later revealed to be the guardian angel of the town's clock tower who traveled back in time to prevent a future in which the town was destroyed as a result of humanity's actions.
Shadow (シャドウ, Shadō)
Voiced by: Hiroshi Shimozaki
Monsters summoned by Bell from peoples' shadows.

=== Other characters ===
Rumi Katagiri (片桐 るみ, Katagiri Rumi)
Voiced by: Hana Tamegai
A student at Plaisir Academy where Nozomi teaches at. She aspires to become a dancer, but due to her parents' divorce and her father's struggling business, she is moving to the countryside where her grandmother lives.
Tomoji Katagiri (片桐知二, Katagiri Tomoji)
Voiced by: Kenji Takahashi
Rumi's father who is a fabric wholesaler whose company has fallen on hard times.
Komiya (小宮) & Kanai (金井)
Voiced by: Mei Shibata (Komiya) and Yurie Mikami (Kanai)
They are students at Plaisir Academy.
Mariko Takigawa (滝川 毱子, Takigawa Mariko)
Voiced by: Makiko Nabei
A world-renowned stage director, who is currently directing Urara's play, Angel.
Nana Shinozaki (篠崎 ナナ, Shinozaki Nana)
Voiced by: Akane Fujita
A high school girl and Karen's patient. She is an excellent running athlete, but was hospitalized after spraining her foot during a race. This made her sensitive and grumpy, even refusing to undergo rehabilitation following surgery. Karen tries to take care of her and, despite an initial disagreement, the two form a bond.
Kaho Sasaki (嘉穂 佐々木, Sasaki Kahō)
Voiced by: Yuki Kodaira
Shimizu (清水)
Voiced by: Eiko Hanawa
Yamaguchi (山口)
Voiced by: Kikumi Umeda
Yumi (ゆみ)
Voiced by: Misaki Ikeda
Kenta & Yuko's son (健太と裕子の息子, Kenta to Yūko no Musuko)
Voiced by: Miyuki Satō

== Production ==
In March 2023, it was announced that Yes! PreCure 5 was to receive a sequel, and that same month, it was announced that Takayuki Hamana will direct the series at both Toei Animation and Studio Deen, with Atsuko Nakajima designing the characters from co-original character concept by Akira Inagami and Toshie Kawamura, while Yoshimi Narita and Naoki Satō are returning to oversee the series' scripts and compose the music from Yes! PreCure 5 respectively. In April 2023, a teaser trailer with narration by Yūko Sanpei, Nozomi's voice actress, was released. In June 2023, additional three cast members were announced, including the two protagonists of Futari wa Pretty Cure Splash Star (the original Yes! PreCure 5's predecessor season). In August of that year, more returning cast members: Mariya Ise, Ai Nagano, Ai Maeda and Eri Sendai would reprise their roles as their respective characters from Yes! PreCure 5. In October of that year, it was announced that Yoko Hikasa was cast as a mysterious character named Bell, and that same month, it was announced that Takeshi Kusao, Miyu Irino, Romi Park and Wataru Takagi would reprise their roles as Coco, Nuts, Syrup and Bunbee respectively from Yes! PreCure 5. The series began airing from October 7, 2023, and is being simulcast by Crunchyroll.

The opening theme song for the series is "Tokimeki" (ときめき; lit. 'Exciting') by Ikimonogakari, while the ending theme song is "Drops of Pretty Cure" (雫のプリキュア, Shizuku no Purikuya), performed by Cure Quartet (Mayumi Gojo, Yuka Uchiyae, Mayu Kudō, and Kanako Miyamoto).

== Episodes ==
No.	Title	Direction	Screenplay	Storyboard	Animation direction	Original release date
1	"The Shape of the Future"; Transliteration: "Mirai no Katachi" (Japanese: ミライノカタチ)	Shigeru Yamazaki	Yoshimi Narita	Takayuki Hamana	Seika Matsui, Risa Sugimoto, Ayaka Murakami, Yuri Nikami, Kiyoko Kametani, Yunchō, Sara Iyama, Maki Fujii (chief)	October 7, 2023
In 2023 – 14 years after the events of Yes! PreCure 5 and Yes! PreCure 5 GoGo! – former Pretty Cure Nozomi Yumehara is working as a teacher, hoping to give dreams to her students. However, she starts to doubt after being unable to support her student Rumi, who dreams of being a dancer but is moving elsewhere due to her father's struggling business. As Nozomi laments her sorrows to her friend, Rin Natsuki, a mysterious figure unleashes darkness on Rumi's father, increasing his negative emotions about his business failure. The next day, as Nozomi and Rin lament that they no longer can become Pretty Cures due to their transformation items disappearing, they reunite with their old friends and fellow Cures, Urara Kasugano, Komachi Akimoto, Karen Minazuki and Kurumi Mimino, with the latter suspecting there is more to their reunion than just coincidence. Meanwhile, the amassed negative emotions from Rumi's father and other people in town summon mysterious monsters.
2	"The Shape of Determination"; Transliteration: "Ketsui no Sugata" (Japanese: ケツイノスガタ)	Taiei Andō	Yoshimi Narita	Yukihiro Matsushita	Yū Yoshiyama, Aya Miyajima, Shun Nakajima, Daichi Nakajima, Yukari Furuike, Yuka Kudo (chief)	October 14, 2023
Nozomi and the others have a drinking party to commemorate their reunion and update each other on their lives. Meanwhile, in the Palmier Kingdom, Syrup notices strange buds growing in the Cure Rose Garden, which Natts identifies as Time Flowers. The next day, as the other Cures struggle in their current careers, Nozomi and Rin are confronted by the monsters, known as Shadows, which multiply as they target peoples' shadows. Nozomi is attacked while defending her students from the Shadows, but her desire to meet Rumi again in the future awakens one of the Time Flowers and she gains the ability to transform into Cure Dream again and defeat the Shadows.
3	"Memories of the Heart"; Transliteration: "Kokoro no Kioku" (Japanese: ココロノキオク)	Matsuo Asami	Deko Akao	Toshio Susukida	Yuri Namiue, Sara Iyama, Mayuko Umigishi, Asami Sodeyama, Ayaka Murakami, Zhang Yun, Ayumi Ono, Seika Matsui, Miho Sugimoto (Chief); Meiji Ishii (Chief), Maki Fujii (Chief), Kiyoko Kametani (Chief)	October 21, 2023
As the girls are curious about how Nozomi became a Pretty Cure again, Karen, now a doctor, worries about one of her patients, Nana Shinozaki, who refuses to do rehab following surgery on her foot. That evening, she has dinner with Kurumi, who ends up drinking too much and spending the night at Karen's house. After being reminded of why she became a doctor from looking after Kurumi, Karen shares her personal experiences with Nana, who in turn shares her frustrations of no longer being able to take up track-and-field during school. When more Shadows appear at the hospital that night, Karen's desire to protect Nana allows her to transform into Cure Aqua, while Kurumi's desire to protect Karen allows her to transform into Milky Rose. Upon reporting this to the other girls, they are reunited with former Pretty Cures, Saki Hyuga and Mai Mishou.
4	"Wings of Doubt"; Transliteration: "Mayoi no Tsubasa" (Japanese: マヨイノツバサ)	Ko-kun	Isao Murayama	Ryōji Fujiwara	Zhang Yun, Risa Sugimoto, Kei Saotome, Daichi Nakajima, Yōen, Gu Jinqui, Yang Guofu, Zhu Zifeng, Meiji Ishii (Chief)	October 28, 2023
Saki, who is working for her family's bakery, announces she is engaged. Mai, who is now a graphic designer, is on the verge of breaking up with her boyfriend. After taking the day-off work to help Saki with her food truck, Mai confides in her she does not see marriage in her future. Just then, they are caught up in a Shadow attack but saved after Nozomi, Kurumi, and Syrup – along with Bunbee – a former enemy of the Pretty Cure 5, arrive. Upon being brought up to speed on the Shadow situation, Saki and Mai decide to support Nozomi and the others in any way they can. As Mai decides to settle things with her boyfriend, Syrup delivers a message from Kurumi to the Palmier Kingdom's king, Coco.
5	"Nozomi's Wish"; Transliteration: "Nozomi no Nozomi" (Japanese: ノゾミノノゾミ)	Takahiro Tanaka	Yoshimi Narita	Ryōji Fujiwara	Yuri Naminoue, Ayaka Murakami, Mayuko Umigishi, Seika Matsui, Miho Sugimoto, Maki Fujii (chief)	November 4, 2023
As the Cures look into the Dark Night Light video channel, who seems to know about the Shadows before anyone else, Natts arrives in town to investigate the Time Flowers growing in the Cure Rose Garden, while Nozomi is concerned that Coco has not come to see her in the past four years. Later, as more Shadows appear in town, Nozomi is abducted by Bell, who attempts to exploit her insecurities. Just then, Coco comes to Nozomi's aid, giving Nozomi the encouragement to fight back.
6	"The Wavering Flame"; Transliteration: "Honō no Yuragi" (Japanese: ホノオノユラギ)	Shigeru Yamazaki	Isao Murayama	Toshio Susukida	Motohide Yoshimura, Aya Miyajima, Zhang Yun, Kana Tsuchimoto, Seika Matsui, Kiyoko Kametani (Chief)	November 11, 2023
While running late to a presentation, Rin spots a dog-like Shadow but pretends not to see it to make it to her presentation on time. Meanwhile, Coco tells Kurumi how he had been watching over Nozomi without coming into contact with her. The next day, following a report by the Dark Night Light channel, Rin and Karen go to a forest near Saki's bakery, where Rin confesses that she had ignored the Shadow before. As Karen tells Rin to rely on others more, more Dog Shadows appear, consuming each other to become more powerful. Realizing she is the only one Karen can rely on, Rin gains the power to transform into Cure Rouge again and help Karen defeat the Shadows.
7	"The Fruit of Sadness"; Transliteration: "Urei no Kajitsu" (Japanese: ウレイノカジツ)	Taiei Andō	Yoshimi Narita	Taiei Andō, Takayuki Hamana	Ayaka Murakami, Tomoyo Sawada, Miwako Masuki, Risa Sugimoto, Meiji Ishii (Chief)	November 18, 2023
Urara, who has been told to take some time off from acting practice, is approached by Syrup to go with him for an outing. Reminded of how much fun she used to have with singing before she turned her focus towards becoming an actress, Urara writes a new song with Syrup which catches the attention of the Dark Night Light Channel and is shared all over the internet. When Bell uses the online comments to spawn Shadows from people's smartphones, Syrup's words give Urara the courage to once again become Cure Lemonade, defeat the Shadows, and find what she was missing with her acting.
8	"My Town"; Transliteration: "Watashi no Machi" (Japanese: ワタシノマチ)	Matsuo Asami	Deko Akao	Toshio Susukida	Zhang Yun, Marina Sato, Aya Miyajima, Daichi Nakajima, Miho Sugimoto (Chief)	November 25, 2023
After noticing the Shadows only appear within the town and surrounding areas, Komachi, along with Nozomi and Coco, visit Sanae Yukishiro to find a link to the Shadow incidents in the town's past. Sanae explains the town was once destroyed during the war, but the clock tower remained standing and gave everyone hope to rebuild it. She further reveals that Bell is the name of an angel engraved on the tower's bell, although Komachi's initial investigation of the bell turns up nothing. When more Shadows appear, Komachi's desire to protect the town allows her to transform into Cure Mint to defeat them. However, after the battle, Nozomi briefly faints, causing concern in the others.
9	"Their Bond"; Transliteration: "Futari no Kizuna" (Japanese: フタリノキズナ)	Mitsuki Kobayashi	Isao Murayama	Mitsuki Kobayashi	Yukari Furuike, Shun Nakajima, Mayuko Umigishi, Kiyoko Kametani, Seika Matsui, Maki Fujii (Chief)	December 2, 2023
Concerned about Saki after spending the day with her, Mai takes her to the Sky Tree to get her to open up. Saki tells her that she is torn between inheriting her family business and going to France to study breadmaking. Just then, they are attacked by a tree-like Shadow, but are rescued by their old friends and former enemies, Michiru and Kaoru. Bell warns them that continuing to get in her way will lead to the planet's downfall, but Saki and Mai's supports of each other allows them to once again transform into Cure Bloom and Cure Egret and defeat the Shadow. The next day, as Michiru and Kaoru, who are revealed to be behind the Dark Night Light Channel, tell the others that Bell resides in the Clock Tower, Nozomi faints again.
10	"The Last Promise"; Transliteration: "Saigo no Yakusoku" (Japanese: サイゴノヤクソク)	Shun Nakajima	Yoshimi Narita	Ryōji Fujiwara	Kei Saotome, Risa Sugimoto, Moe Matsuda, Tomoyo Sawada, Zhang Yun, Meiji Ishii (Chief)	December 9, 2023
Natts warns the girls to stop transforming into Pretty Cures, as the Time Flowers that turn them younger and allow them to transform are taking a toll on their bodies and could potentially kill them. As the girls become conflicted between saving people's lives and putting their own at risk, Michiru and Kaoru tell Saki and Mai that the Shadows tend to emerge from humans with malicious intent. The next day, Bell unleashes countless Shadows upon the town. Despite the risks involved, the Cures remain determined to fight and protect the town. Deciding this will be her last time transforming, Nozomi makes a promise with Coco before heading off into battle. Upon being confronted by the Cures, Bell reveals she is from a future in which the town has been destroyed because of the actions of humans.
11	"The End of the Future"; Transliteration: "Mirai no Owari" (Japanese: ミライノオワリ)	Tetsuji Nakamura	Yoshimi Narita	Takashi Iida	Yū Yoshiyama, Seika Matsui, Yukari Furiuke, Zhang Yun, Kiyoko Kametani (Chief), Miho Sugimoto (Chief), Maki Fujii (Chief), Ayaka Murakami (Chief)	December 16, 2023
Bell reveals that in her future, pollution affected the climate and led to extreme weather conditions that caused people to abandon the town. As Bell continues to produce Shadows from the humans whose thoughtless actions would cause this future, she merges them into a giant Shadow, only for it to run amok and start destroying the very town she was trying to protect. As Nozomi becomes further affected by her wilting Time Flower, the Pretty Cures are aided by Cure Black and Cure White.
12	"The Power of Hope"; Transliteration: "Kibō no Chikara" (Japanese: キボウノチカラ)	Ko-kun and Takayuki Hamana	Yoshimi Narita	Takayuki Hamana	Kei Saotome, Risa Sugimoto, Yū Yoshiyama, Ayaka Murakami, Daichi Nakajima, Seika Matsui, Zhang Yun, Kenta Yokoya, Kiyoko Kametani (Chief), Tomoyo Sawada (Chief), Miho Sugimoto (Chief), Kyoko Yufu (Chief), Mayuko Umigishi (Chief)	December 23, 2023
As the Shadow continues to grow larger, Kaoru and Michiru stream the fight to the public, urging them to do their best to protect their town. This brings forth a light of hope, giving the Pretty Cures the power to defeat the Shadow and Bell a hope for a brighter future. After the battle, however, Nozomi dies as her Time Flower completely wilts, but Bell negates the effects and she falls into a coma instead. Some time later, as the girls and the townspeople continue to work towards their dreams, Nozomi awakens from her coma after Coco confesses his love and asks her to marry him.

== Notes ==
Preceded by Soaring Sky! Pretty Cure	Power of Hope: PreCure Full Bloom; 2023	Succeeded by Wonderful Pretty Cure!
