= Spacewalking with You =

Japanese manga series

- First tankōbon volume cover, featuring Keisuke Uno (left) and Yamato Kobayashi (right)

君と宇宙を歩くために (Kimi to Uchū o Aruku Tame ni)
- Genre: Buddy comedy; Coming-of-age; Slice of life
- Manga
- Written by: Inuhiko Doronoda
- Published by: Kodansha
- English publisher: NA: Kodansha USA
- Imprint: Afternoon KC
- Magazine: &Sofa
- Original run: June 26, 2023 – present
- Volumes: 7
- icon

Spacewalking with You (Japanese: 君と宇宙を歩くために, Hepburn: Kimi to Uchū o Aruku Tame ni) is a Japanese manga series written and illustrated by Inuhiko Doronoda. It began serialization on Kodansha's &Sofa manga website in June 2023.

In 2024, the series won the 17th Manga Taishō.

== Synopsis ==
Yamato Kobayashi is a yankī who struggles with school and holding a part-time job, and is on the verge of becoming a delinquent. His life begins to change after he becomes friends with Keisuke Uno, an eccentric transfer student.

== Publication ==
Written and illustrated by Inuhiko Doronoda, Spacewalking with You has been serialized on Kodansha's &Sofa website since June 26, 2023. Its first chapter was published in the August 2023 issue of Kodansha's seinen manga magazine Monthly Afternoon, released three days earlier on June 23; between November 2023 and April 2025, six additional bonus stories were published in Monthly Afternoon. The series' chapters have been collected into seven tankōbon volumes as of October 2026.

At Anime Expo 2024, Kodansha USA announced that they licensed the series for English publication. The first volume was released on May 27, 2025.

=== Volumes ===
No.	Original release date	Original ISBN	English release date	English ISBN
1	November 22, 2023	978-4-06-533487-4	May 27, 2025	979-8-88877-438-0
1. "One Giant Leap" (ワン・ジャイアント・リープ, Wan Jaianto Riipu); 2. "The Way Home for Lost Stars" (惑う星たちの帰り道, Madō Hoshitachi no Kaerimichi); 3. "My Admirable Senpai" (憧れの先輩!, Akogare no Senpai!)
2	May 22, 2024	978-4-06-535388-2	November 25, 2025	979-8-88877-439-7
4. "Space is Kinda Cool" (重力っていいな, Jūryoku tte Iina); 5. "Motivation" (もちベーション, Mochibēshon); 6. "That's What Makes You Cool!" (そういうところがかっこいい!, Sōiu Tokoro ga Kakkoii!); 7. "Searching for a Reason" (理由を探して, Riyū o Sagashite); Bonus Story 1: "Hanpen Chit-Chat" (はんペン談義, Han Pen Dangi); Bonus Story 2: "Tamagoyaki Rhapsody" (たまごやきラプソディ, Tamagoyaki Rapusodi) (Note: Published in Monthly Afternoon on November 25, 2023.)
3	October 22, 2024	978-4-06-537200-5	July 7, 2026	979-8-88877-530-1
8. "Once You Know It's There" (Note: Titled "When You Think about It Being There" on the K Manga digital service.) (あると思うと, Aru to Omōto); 9. "Incredible Energy" (すごいエネルギー, Sugoi Enerugii); 10. "Who Needs a Point?" (意味がなくても, Imi ga Nakute mo); 11. "A Very Special Christmas" (Note: Titled "Special Festival" on the K Manga digital service.) (とくべつなお祭り, Tokubetsu Nao Matsuri); Bonus Story 1: "Favorite Tune" (お気に入りのメロディ, Okiniiri no Merodi) (Note: Published in Monthly Afternoon on April 25, 2024.); Bonus Story 2: "At Karaoke" (カラオケにて, Karaoke nite) (Note: Published in Monthly Afternoon on May 24, 2024.)
4	April 23, 2025	978-4-06-539152-5	November 10, 2026	979-8-88877-686-5
12. "What You See and What You Don't" (Note: Titled "Between the Interior and Exterior" on the K Manga digital service.) (外側と内側のあいだで, Sotogawa to Uchigawa no Aida de); 13. "While Waiting for Om-Soba" (オムそばを待ちながら, Omu Soba o Machinagara); 14. "Trust?!" (信頼!?, Shinrai!?); 15. "Because We're Different" (自分じゃないから, Jibun janaikara); 16. "Even If You Don't Stand Out" (Note: Titled "Even if I Don't Stand Out" on the K Manga digital service.) (目立たなくても, Medatanakute mo); Bonus Story 1: "My Favorite Things" (マイフェイバリットシングス, Mai Feibaritto Shingusu) (Note: Published in Monthly Afternoon on October 25, 2024.); Bonus Story 2: "Fruit Discourse" (果物談議, Kudamono Dangi) (Note: Published in Monthly Afternoon on December 24, 2024.)
5	October 23, 2025	978-4-06-541165-0	February 23, 2027	979-8-88877-921-7
17. "Anti-Birthday Boys" (バースデー・アンチ・ボーイズ, Bāsudē Anchi Bōizu); 18. "If I Could Be Kind" (優しくなれたら, Yasashiku Naretara); 19. "Invisible Vibe" (見えない空気, Mienai Kūki); 20. "I'll Teach You" (教えてあげよう, Oshiete Ageyō); 21. "It's Like a Dream" (夢みたいな, Yume Mitai na); Boisu Dorama Shūroku Repo Manga (ボイスドラマ収録レポ漫画) (Note: Published in Monthly Afternoon on April 24, 2025.)
6	May 22, 2026	978-4-06-543386-7	—	—
22. "Don't Leave Me" (おいてかないでね, Oite Kanaide ne); 23. "To Our Desired Destination" (行きたいところへ, Ikitaitokoro e); 24. "The Good and Bad of Growing Up" (成長よしあし, Seichō Yoshiashi); 25. "Peek into the Telescope" (望遠鏡を覗き込んで, Bōenkyō o Nozoki Konde); Bonus Story 1: Kuida Ore Dangi in Ōsaka (食いだおれ談義 in大阪); Bonus Story 2: O Toku Masutā (お得マスター); Bonus Story 3: Kuwaietto Furenzu (クワイエットフレンズ)
7	October 22, 2026	978-4-06-545249-3	—	—

== Reception ==
The series won the 17th Manga Taishō in 2024. It ranked sixth at the 3rd Late Night Manga Awards in 2024 hosted by Bungeishunjū's Crea magazine. It topped the 2025 edition of Takarajimasha's Kono Manga ga Sugoi! guidebook's list of the best manga for male readers. The series ranked third in the Nationwide Bookstore Employees' Recommended Comics list of 2025. It was nominated for the 49th Kodansha Manga Award in 2025 in the general category; It was also nominated for the 50th edition in the same category in 2026. It was also nominated at the Japan Society and Anime NYC's second American Manga Awards for Best New Manga in 2025. The series, alongside Host to Shachiku, won the Men's Comic Prize at the 2026 Digital Comic Awards. The series has been nominated for the 30th Tezuka Osamu Cultural Prize in 2026.
