= Within the Villainess =

Japanese light novel series

- First light novel volume cover

悪役令嬢の中の人～断罪された転生者のため嘘つきヒロインに復讐いたします～ (Akuyaku Reijō no Naka no Hito ~Danzai Sareta Tensei-sha no Tame Usotsuki Hiroin ni Fukushū Itashimasu~)
- Genre: Isekai
- Novel series
- Written by: Makiburo
- Published by: Shōsetsuka ni Narō
- Original run: May 14, 2020 – May 25, 2020
- Light novel
- Written by: Makiburo
- Illustrated by: Mai Murasaki
- Published by: Ichijinsha
- Imprint: Ichijinsha Novels
- Original run: February 2, 2021 – February 2, 2024
- Volumes: 2
- Manga
- Written by: Makiburo
- Illustrated by: Nazuna Shiraume
- Published by: Ichijinsha
- English publisher: NA: Abrams ComicArts
- Magazine: Comic Lake
- Original run: November 19, 2021 – May 30, 2025
- Volumes: 6
- Anime television series
- Directed by: Yoshihisa Iida
- Written by: Hiroyuki Yoshino
- Music by: Shūji Katayama
- Studio: Roll2
- Original run: 2027 – scheduled
- icon

Within the Villainess (Note: Japanese: 悪役令嬢の中の人～断罪された転生者のため嘘つきヒロインに復讐いたします～, Hepburn: Akuyaku Reijō no Naka no Hito ~Danzai Sareta Tensei-sha no Tame Usotsuki Hiroin ni Fukushū Itashimasu~; lit. 'The Person Within the Villainess: I Will Take Revenge on the Lying Heroine for the Condemned Reincarnator') is a Japanese light novel series written by Makiburo and illustrated by Mai Murasaki. It was originally serialized on the user-generated novel publishing website Shōsetsuka ni Narō in May 2020. It was later acquired by Ichijinsha who began publishing it under their Ichijinsha Novels light novel imprint in February 2021. A manga adaptation illustrated by Nazuna Shiraume was serialized on the Pixiv Comic website under Ichijinsha's Comic Lake brand from November 2021 to May 2025. An anime television series adaptation produced by Roll2 is set to premiere in 2027.

== Premise ==
After a high fever, the young noble lady Remilia awakens to the shocking realization that her body is now hosting the reincarnated soul of a Japanese girl named Emi, while her own soul remains trapped in her body and unable to control it. Though initially furious, Remilia gradually accepts Emi as the dearest person in her life by sensing Emi's kindness and experiencing her beautiful memories.

Emi realizes she has been reincarnated into the villainess of an otome game, Hoshi no Otome to Guze no Kishi, (Note: Hoshi no Otome to Guze no Kishi (星の乙女と救世の騎士; lit. The Star Maiden and the Knight of Salvation)) which she played before. Out of compassion and a desire to change the tragic destiny of the character, Emi diligently trains herself and builds positive relationships, hoping to help the character find a happy ending.

Everything should have gone that way. But unexpectedly, Emi still falls into the same tragic end when she is framed by the saintess, who also reincarnated into this world like her. Overwhelmed by grief, Emi's soul falls into a deep slumber, allowing Remilia's soul to regain control of the body. Bearing a burning grudge against the Saintess and this world, Remilia is determined to vindicate Emi and take revenge on the Saintess. Simultaneously, she promises to build a beautiful world where Emi can live happily. With her sharp intellect, inherent power, and knowledge of both the game and Earth through Emi, Remilia carries out her plan step by step.

== Characters ==
Remilia Rosa Graupner (レミリア・ローゼ・グラウプナー, Remiria Rōze Guraupunā)
Voiced by: Miyuki Sawashiro
The main female antagonist of the game. Remilia grows up without love, which leads her to develop an extreme personality. After the soul of a girl named Emi reincarnates into her body, Remilia begins to experience Emi's previous life through her memories. Initially filled with anger, Remilia gradually comes to see Emi as her dearest person. She resolves to clear Emi's name and take revenge on the saintess and all those involved, while also building a better world where Emi can live happily.
Emi Kobayashi (小林恵美(エミ), Kobayashi Emi)
Voiced by: Rie Takahashi
A soul that reincarnates into Remilia's body. Originally a normal girl who had a happy and joyful life in Japan. After her death, Emi reincarnates as the villainess in a game world she once played. Feeling deep sympathy for the character's tragic destiny in the original storyline, Emi becomes determined to change it and create a happy ending. After experiencing a devastating emotional blow during the first major event in the game, Emi's soul falls into a deep sleep, returning the body to Remilia.
Pina Blanche (ピナ・ブランシュ, Pina Buranshu)
Voiced by: Ayane Sakura
The main female protagonist and the true saintess (Note: Hoshi no otome (星の乙女, lit. Star Maiden)) of the game. Throughout the story, her body is possessed by the reincarnated soul of Rina. After the incident where Remilia is framed, Pina's soul is finally freed from her body.
Rina (リィナ)
A soul from Earth who reincarnates into Pina's body. Rina is characterized by a selfish personality. Upon entering the academy, Rina discovers the original story has changed because everyone treats Remilia kindly due to Emi's influence. Determined to return the story to its original path, she devises a plan to frame Remilia. Rina's plan succeeds, resulting in Remilia being exiled to an abandoned village.
Williard Ark Klaisen (ウィリアルド・アーク・クライゼン, Wiriarudo Āku Kuraizen)
The second prince, heir to the throne, and one of the main male protagonists of the game. He has been engaged to Remilia since childhood. However, after meeting Pina (possessed by Rina's soul), he is deceived and led to falsely accuse Remilia. As a result, he breaks off his engagement with Remilia and becomes engaged to Pina instead.
Ángel (アンヘル, Anheru)
The Demon King who rules over the demon realm, possessing eyes that can see through lies. Ángel joins forces with Remilia to defeat the creator god, the source of the miasma, to save the world and the demon realm, thereby completely altering the game's original storyline. After the battle, Remilia helps him build a relationship with humankind.

== Media ==
=== Light novel ===
Written by Makiburo, Within the Villainess was originally serialized on the user-generated novel publishing website Shōsetsuka ni Narō from May 14 to 25, 2020. It was later acquired by Ichijinsha who began publishing it with illustrations by Mai Murasaki under their Ichijinsha Novels imprint on February 2, 2021. Two volumes have been released as of February 2024.

No.	Release date	ISBN
1	February 2, 2021	978-4-7580-9337-8
2	February 2, 2024	978-4-7580-9588-4

=== Manga ===
A manga adaptation illustrated by Nazuna Shiraume was serialized on the Pixiv Comic website under Ichijinsha's Comic Lake brand from November 19, 2021, to May 30, 2025. The manga's chapters were compiled into six tankōbon volumes released from April 25, 2022, to June 25, 2025.

In March 2026, Abrams ComicArts announced that they had licensed the manga for English publication, with the first volume set to release in July 2027.

No.	Original release date	Original ISBN	English release date	English ISBN
1	April 25, 2022	978-4-7580-2386-3	July 6, 2027	978-1-4197-8004-2
2	October 25, 2022	978-4-7580-2459-4	October 5, 2027	978-1-4197-8005-9
3	May 25, 2023	978-4-7580-2536-2	—	—
4	February 24, 2024	978-4-7580-2655-0	—	—
5	November 25, 2024	978-4-7580-2804-2	—	—
6	June 25, 2025	978-4-7580-2924-7	—	—

=== Anime ===
An anime adaptation was announced on May 30, 2025. It was later confirmed to be a television series that will be produced by Roll2 and directed by Yoshihisa Iida, with Hiroyuki Yoshino handling series composition, Reiko Nagasawa designing the characters, and Shūji Katayama composing the music. It is set to premiere in 2027.

== Reception ==
The manga adaptation was nominated for the eighth Next Manga Awards in the digital category in 2022 and was ranked 20th. The manga was also nominated for the ninth edition in 2023 and was ranked 9th. The manga was also nominated for the Web Manga General Election 10th Anniversary Edition in 2023, and was ranked 5th. The manga was nominated for the same award the following year and was ranked 3rd. The manga was also ranked eighth in AnimeJapan's "Manga We Want to See Animated" poll in 2025. The manga, alongside Orizuru and Host to Shachiku, was ranked eighth in the 2026 edition of Takarajimasha's Kono Manga ga Sugoi! guidebook's list of the best manga for female readers.

== See also ==
- Betrothed to My Sister's Ex, another light novel series by the same illustrator
- I'm the Villainess, So I'm Taming the Final Boss, another light novel series by the same illustrator
