= Gushing over Magical Girls =

Japanese manga series

- First English language tankōbon volume cover, featuring Utena Hiiragi as Magia Baiser

魔法少女にあこがれて (Mahō Shōjo ni Akogarete)
- Genre: Black comedy; Magical girl; Yuri
- Manga
- Written by: Akihiro Ononaka
- Published by: Takeshobo
- English publisher: NA: J-Novel Club; Coolmic (digital); Yen Press (print)
- Magazine: Storia Dash; Manga Life Storia (2019)
- Original run: March 29, 2019 – present
- Volumes: 13
- Anime television series
- Directed by: Masato Suzuki; Atsushi Ōtsuki
- Produced by: Takashi Kouchiyama; Ryuutarou Usukura; Atsushi Kimura; Taiyou Matsuda; Shuka Nishimae; Kouta Kimizuka; Shuuhei Yamamoto
- Written by: Noboru Kimura
- Music by: Yasuharu Takanashi; Akinari Suzuki; Johannes Nilsson
- Studio: Asahi Production
- Licensed by: Sentai Filmworks (Note: Home video rights through Section23 Films and streaming rights through Hidive.)
- Original network: AT-X (partially uncensored); Tokyo MX, BS11, SUN, KBS Kyoto (censored)
- Original run: January 3, 2024 – present
- Episodes: 13
- icon

Gushing over Magical Girls (Japanese: 魔法少女にあこがれて, Hepburn: Mahō Shōjo ni Akogarete), also known as I Admire Magical Girls, and..., (Note: This alternative English title is seen on the cover of the Japanese version of the manga.) is a Japanese magical girl manga series written and illustrated by Akihiro Ononaka. It began serialization on Takeshobo's Storia Dash website in March 2019. Thirteen tankōbon volumes have been released as of September 2026. It is licensed in English by J-Novel Club. An anime television series adaptation produced by Asahi Production aired from January to March 2024. It is licensed outside of Japan by Sentai Filmworks for streaming and home video. A second season is set to premiere in 2027.

== Plot ==
Utena Hiiragi is a normal, introverted girl with a strong admiration for magical girls, especially the beautiful trio that protect her town, Tres Magia. One day, a mascot named Venalita approaches Utena and gives her magical powers, but rather than becoming the magical girl of justice she always wanted to be, she instead becomes an evil general of the Enormita organization. Despite the misfortune in being forced to fight against the magical girls she admires, Utena soon discovers that she has a hidden sadistic side. She revels in torturing her idols with her newfound obsession.

== Characters ==
Due to magical powers, the true identity of Tres Magia's members when transformed is unknown to Enormita's members and vice versa. As the magical girls' power come from their emotions, some of them later learn to assume a more powerful form known as "La Veritas" when their emotions grow stronger.

=== Enormita / Evil Magical Girls ===
Utena Hiiragi (柊 うてな, Hiiragi Utena) / Magia Baiser (マジアベーゼ, Majia Bēze)
Voiced by: Fūka Izumi
A shy and introverted school girl who admires magical girls, but also loves them in a twisted sense. She was forced into joining Enormita against her will, but soon comes to revel in her sadistic side, eventually becoming a perverted villain. As Magia Baiser, she wears a succubus/dominatrix motif, and is able to use her crop to transform inanimate objects and animals into sadistic monsters. After defeating Lord, she develops a much stronger form, which evolves into spider motif when she attains her La Veritas form. She has an interest in sewing, and her grades have been affected by her interest in Enormita. She later becomes Enormita's new leader following Lord's defeat.
Venalita (ヴェナリータ, Venarīta)
Voiced by: Misato Fukuen
A black mascot character who tricked Utena into joining Enormita, blackmailing her into staying through sharing a video of her on social media. Its motive is unknown and it seems to be very manipulative, but nevertheless supportive of Utena and her friends.
Kiwi Araga (阿良河 キウィ, Araga Kiwi) / Leoparde (レオパルト, Reoparuto)
Voiced by: Aoi Koga
A member of Enormita who is in love with Utena, to the point she even decides to transfer to her school. As a civilian, she is an Internet celebrity, but grows to hate Tres Magia and magical girls in general for stealing her fans. As Leoparde, she wears a military motif and attacks using various explosives and guns. During her fight against Sister, she reveals a more powerful form. She has strong heated rivalry with Magia Sulfur.
Korisu Morino (杜乃 こりす, Morino Korisu) / Nero Alice (ネロアリス, Nero Arisu)
Voiced by: Shiori Sugiura
A member of Enormita, a quiet girl in elementary school who does not speak much but loves playing with toys. As Nero Alice, she wears an Alice motif, able to manipulate toys in various ways, such as trapping victims in doll houses, influencing a person's mind, or making stuffed toys giant.
Roboko (ロボ子)
A robot girl given life by Utena and Korisu's combined powers. Originally a doll that was given to Korisu by her mother and fixed up by Utena, and a plastic model given to her by Kiwi, she is sworn to protect Korisu.
Matama Akoya (阿古屋 真珠, Akoya Matama) / Loco Musica (ロコムジカ, Roko Mujika)
Voiced by: Yūka Aisaka
A member of Enormita and former member of the Lord Squad who aspires to be an idol, but is terrible at singing. As Loco Musica, she wears a sailor motif and uses sound waves to attack her enemies.
Nemo Anemo (姉母 ネモ, Anemo Nemo) / Leberblume (ルベルブルーメ, Ruberuburūme)
Voiced by: Minami Tsuda
A member of Enormita and former member of the Lord Squad who cares for Matama. As Leberblume, she wears an assassin motif and is able to transform herself into a shadow and manipulate others.
Holy Tengeiji (天花寺 ホリィ, Tengeiji Holy) / Sister Gigant (シスタギガント, Shisuta Giganto)
Voiced by: Kikuko Inoue
A member of Enormita and The Lord Squad who wears a nun motif and has the ability to change her size to become gigantic or tiny. Following Lord's defeat, she goes into hiding to continue serving Venalita behind Utena's back.

=== Heroic Magical Girls ===
==== Tres Magia ====
Haruka Hanabishi (花菱 はるか, Hanabishi Haruka) / Magia Magenta (マジアマゼンタ, Majia Mazenta)
Voiced by: Kaori Maeda
Utena's classmate. A naïve, kind, pure-hearted girl. Wielding a spear, she starts out with no unique ability, but eventually gains the power to heal others. Following an incident in which Baiser's magic went out of control and manipulated her, she ends up obtaining a Dark La Veritas form, Fallen Nurse, which enhances her healing abilities in perverted ways.
Sayo Minakami (水神 小夜, Minakami Sayo) / Magia Azure (マジアアズール, Majia Azūru)
Voiced by: Mayuko Kazama
She is a shrine maiden who likes to clean the temple. She loves peace and she prefers cute, modest outfits. She seems to have a secret masochistic side to her, as she likes spending time with Magia Baiser. She has power over water and ice and gathers water around her wand to form a sword. After nearly succumbing to Baiser's sadism, Azure obtains the La Veritas form Maiden of Hoarfrost, giving her the ability to power herself up by taking on enemy attacks.
Kaoruko Tenkawa (天川 薫子, Tenkawa Kaoruko) / Magia Sulfur (マジアサルファ, Majia Sarufa)
Voiced by: Misaki Ikeda
She is the tough, quick-witted, no nonsense team member. While seen as the defensive member of the team, she secretly wields massive knuckledusters for pummeling her enemies. She obtains the La Veritas form Blizengel, which gives her lightning speed and the ability to launch projectile fists. She has a strong heated rivalry with Leoparde.
Vatz (ヴァーツ, Vātsu)
Voiced by: Kana Asumi
Tres Magia's mascot, who is the same kind of creature as Venalita, but is white instead.

==== Shio-chans ====
Michiko Tanaka (田中 みち子, Tanaka Michiko) / Shion Imita (忌田 シオン, Imita Shion) / Imitatio (イミタシオ, Imitashio) / Lord Enorme (ロードエノルメ, Rōdo Enorume)
Voiced by: Yoko Hikasa
Former leader of Enormita who defected to create the Lord Squad in the hopes of ruling the world and is now the leader of the Shio-chans. As Lord Enorme, her magic allows her to create monsters out of black goop. After she is humiliatingly defeated by Utena and ambushed by Sister Gigant, she escapes with heavy injuries and is later nursed back to health by Randa. She uses a stolen magical girl item to become the magical girl Imitatio, using her military officer-themed La Veritas form constantly to masquerade as Shion Imita. As Imitatio, she wields a large sword and can utilise various potions to affect her enemies. Initially driven by revenge against Utena and Enormita, she eventually reforms and becomes a true magical girl in order to protect Randa.
Momo Momomori (桃森 百花, Momomori Momo) / Pantano Pesca (パンタノペスカ, Pantano Pesuka)
A member of the Shio-chans who wears a scholar motif in La Veritas mode and enjoys indulging in perverted behavior. She is able to manipulate the earth to her liking and create golems.
Randa Tada (多田 蘭朶, Tada Randa) / Berserga (ベルゼルガ, Beruzeruga)
A masochistic member of the Shio-chans. Formerly known as Magia Blanc, she fell in love with Michiko after being spared from her magical girl hunt due to being considered "too weak" to hunt. She can transform her own blood into sharp weapons and wears a mummy motif in La Veritas mode.

== Media ==
=== Manga ===
Written and illustrated by Akihiro Ononaka, Gushing over Magical Girls began serialization on Takeshobo's Storia Dash website on March 29, 2019. It was also serialized on the company's Manga Life Storia magazine, until it ceased publication in July 2019. As of September 2026, thirteen tankōbon volumes have been published. On March 15, 2024, it was announced the manga would go on hiatus due to Ononaka's health issues. The series resumed serialization on Takeshobo's TakeComi! website on October 17, 2025.

J-Novel Club licensed the series for English release, and began pre-publishing it in March 2022. Previously, Coolmic licensed the series and published the manga divided in, as of late December 2022, 68 "episodes" consisting of about 10 pages each, on a smartphone-only website, under the title "I Admire Magical Girls, and....". In January 2025, J-Novel Club announced that a print release would begin publication in July 2025.

==== Volumes ====
No.	Original release date	Original ISBN	English release date	English ISBN
1	November 30, 2019	978-4-8019-6809-7	June 1, 2022 (digital); July 15, 2025 (print)	978-1-7183-8370-8 (digital); 978-1-7183-3930-9 (print)
Episodes 1–5
2	April 30, 2020	978-4-8019-6862-2	August 2, 2022 (digital); August 12, 2025 (print)	978-1-7183-8371-5 (digital); 978-1-7183-3931-6 (print)
Episodes 6–10
3	September 30, 2020	978-4-8019-7073-1	September 28, 2022 (digital); September 9, 2025 (print)	978-1-7183-8372-2 (digital); 978-1-7183-3932-3 (print)
Episodes 11–15
4	February 27, 2021	978-4-8019-7212-4	December 1, 2022 (digital); October 14, 2025 (print)	978-1-7183-8373-9 (digital); 978-1-7183-3933-0 (print)
Episodes 16–20
5	July 29, 2021	978-4-8019-7372-5	February 20, 2023 (digital); November 11, 2025 (print)	978-1-7183-8374-6 (digital); 978-1-7183-3934-7 (print)
Episodes 21–25
6	December 27, 2021	978-4-8019-7507-1	May 31, 2023 (digital); December 9, 2025 (print)	978-1-7183-8375-3 (digital); 978-1-7183-3935-4 (print)
Episodes 26–30
7	May 30, 2022	978-4-8019-7635-1	August 19, 2023 (digital); January 13, 2026 (print)	978-1-7183-8376-0 (digital); 978-1-7183-3936-1 (print)
Episodes 31–35
8	October 17, 2022	978-4-8019-7879-9	October 25, 2023 (digital); February 10, 2026 (print)	978-1-7183-8377-7 (digital); 978-1-7183-3937-8 (print)
Episodes 36–40
9	March 16, 2023	978-4-8019-7976-5	January 24, 2024 (digital); March 10, 2026 (print)	978-1-7183-8378-4 (digital); 978-1-7183-3938-5 (print)
Episodes 41–45
10	August 17, 2023	978-4-8019-8118-8	August 28, 2024 (digital); May 11, 2026 (print)	978-1-7183-8379-1 (digital); 978-1-7183-3939-2 (print)
Episodes 46–50
11	January 17, 2024	978-4-8019-8232-1	February 5, 2025 (digital); July 14, 2026 (print)	978-1-7183-8380-7 (digital); 978-1-7183-3940-8 (print)
Episodes 51–55
12	February 17, 2026	978-4-8019-8889-7	—	—
Episodes 56–60
13	September 16, 2026	978-4-8019-9080-7	—	—
Episodes 61–65

=== Anime ===
An anime television series adaptation was announced on March 16, 2023. The series was produced by Asahi Production and directed by Masato Suzuki and Atsushi Ōtsuki, with series composition by Noboru Kimura, character designs by Yasuka Otakil, and music composed by Yasuharu Takanashi, Akinari Suzuki, and Johannes Nilsson. It aired from January 3 to March 27, 2024, on AT-X and other networks. The series aired censored on all television networks and partially uncensored with censored audio on AT-X and streaming sites, with the fully uncensored visuals and audio being featured on the home media release. The opening theme song is "My Dream Girls", performed by Nacherry (a voice unit composed of Chiemi Tanaka and Natsumi Murakami), while the ending theme song is "Togetoge Sadistic" (とげとげサディスティック) performed by Fūka Izumi, Aoi Koga and Shiori Sugiura (with additional vocals by Yūka Aisaka and Minami Tsuda from episode 10 onwards).

Sentai Filmworks licensed the series in North America, Australia and British Isles for streaming on its Hidive platform and home video through Section23 Films, simulcasting the AT-X version as it aired.

A second season was announced during an event for the anime series on October 5, 2024. It is set to premiere in 2027.

==== Episodes ====
No.	Title (Note: English translated titles are taken from Hidive.)	Directed by (Note: Production staff information is taken from the ending credits of each episode.)	Written by	Storyboarded by	Original release date
1	"A Villain is Born!?"; Transliteration: "Aku no Onna Kanbu, Tanjō!?" (Japanese: 悪の女幹部、誕生!?)	Masato Suzuki	Noboru Kimura	Masato Suzuki	January 3, 2024
A town is protected by the Tres Magia team of magical girls; Magia Magenta, Magia Azure, and Magia Sulfur. Utena Hiiragi, a girl who wishes to become a magical girl herself, is approached by a mascot character named Venalita, who transforms her not into a magical girl but a general of the evil organization Enormita. Despite trying to get out of it, Utena is blackmailed by Venalita after it threatens to upload a sexy video of her if she doesn't comply and is forced into a fight against Tres Magia. Forced to defend herself, Utena uses her new whip weapon to create a monster from a flower, which restrains the magical girls and awakens Utena's inner sadist as she is prompted to spank them, until they break free and force her to retreat. The next day, as the girls behind Tres Magia; Haruka Hanabishi, Sayo Minakami, and Kaoruko Tenkawa, who are unaware of Utena's true identity and vice versa, are still reeling from the previous day's pain, Venalita arranges another fight between them and Utena, who animates some mannequins to tickle torture the magical girls, until they break free and force her to retreat.
2	"Her Name is Magia Baiser!"; Transliteration: "Sono Na wa, Majia Bēze" (Japanese: その名は、マジアベーゼ)	Maki Kamiya	Yasunori Yamada	Atsushi Ōtsuki	January 10, 2024
While visiting the shrine where Sayo works at after school, Utena is drawn to several S&M magazines secretly placed on the shrine grounds by Venalita, causing her to inadvertently transform into her villain form and attract Azure's attention. Using her powers on a mask to blindfold Azure, Utena takes advantage of Azure's defenseless state and heightened senses to put what she learned from the magazines into practice. The next day, as Sayo is left emotionally confused and slightly traumatized by the ordeal, Utena is called into battle against Sulfur. Utena uses a candle monster to remove her top and pour hot wax over her body, but Sulfur reveals her true violent nature that she normally keeps hidden, bringing out powerful knuckle weapons to get the upper hand. Forced to retreat, while also leaving behind wax doppelgangers of herself, Utena leaves behind the villain name she had decided upon for herself, Magia Baiser, while another girl watches her from above.
3	"The Explosive Leoparde"; Transliteration: "Bakuretsu Musume Reoparuto" (Japanese: 爆裂娘レオパルト)	Aoi Mori	Noboru Kimura	Aoi Mori	January 17, 2024
Venalita takes Utena to Enormita's hideout, Nachtbase, to meet another Enormita member, Kiwi Araga aka Leoparde, the girl from the previous episode. Having joined Enormita out of spite of Tres Magia's popularity and feeling annoyed with Utena for sparing them, Kiwi fights against her using an array of explosives and weaponry. However, Utena, accepting her sadistic nature, manages to use a lightbulb to trap Kiwi and subject her to electrical shocks, leading Kiwi to fall in love with Utena and transfer to her school. On another day, Utena and Kiwi go on a date together which culminates in Kiwi transforming the both of them, attracting Tres Magia's attention. While Kiwi fights against Magenta and Sulfur, Azure becomes subjected to more of Utena's punishment. When Kiwi runs out of magic, however, Utena saves her by using her whip on an Azure figure she had bought to distract the magical girls, which allows them to escape.
4	"Everyone Loves the Tres Magia!"; Transliteration: "Saikyō Aidoru ♥ Toresu Majia" (Japanese: 最強アイドル♥トレスマジア)	Kouta Amagi	Yasunori Yamada	Kouta Amagi	January 24, 2024
Following another victory against the magical girls, Utena has to study for a make up exam to avoid having her magical girl collection thrown out, but ends up having to fight Magenta on the way home, leaving her in an embarrassing state of undress in public with her scissor monsters. Finding herself unable to concentrate on studying due to cutting their battle short, Utena faces Magenta again the next day, only to find she has taken unexpected precautions against her scissor attack. In the end, Utena is unable to study but manages to survive the make up exam thanks to Kiwi. On another day, Tres Magia attend a photoshoot with their mascot/manager Vatz, only for their magic blocking forcefield generator to get accidentally destroyed by the staff, drawing Enormita's attention. Utena and Kiwi combine their attacks to lay down an explosive offensive, but Sulfur takes advantage of the resulting smoke to bring out her knuckles against them without having to worry about public image. Despite this, Utena and Kiwi still manage to defeat them and leave afterwards.
5	"Neroalice in Wonderland"; Transliteration: "Fushigi no Kuni no Neroarisu" (Japanese: 不思議の国のネロアリス)	Tomio Yamauchi	Noboru Kimura	Takehiro Nakayama	January 31, 2024
Venalita introduces Utena and Kiwi to the newest member of Enormita, a young girl named Korisu Morino aka Neroalice, who they had recently recruited. Korisu soon showcases her ability to manipulate toys by trapping Tres Magia inside a doll's house, which starts to affect their personalities in weird ways up until Korisu gets sleepy and runs out of energy. On another day, Korisu invites Utena and Kiwi over to her house, where Utena offers to help mend a damaged doll that she received from her mother. As Utena ends up catching a cold from staying up all night fixing the doll, Korisu repays her by using her powers to become a nurse and treat her.
6	"The Tres Magia's Secret Backstory"; Transliteration: "Toresu Majia Tanjō Hiwa" (Japanese: トレスマジア誕生秘話)	Takahiro Ōtsuka	Noboru Kimura	Kazutaka Muraki & Aoi Mori	February 7, 2024
Trying to act more like a mother to her teammates and friends, Haruka spends some time playing with Korisu at the park. Afterwards, Korisu transforms into Neroalice and traps Magenta inside her dollhouse, where she is made to believe she is a baby. Although she manages to regain her senses by thinking about her friends and remembering how she and Azure recruited Kaoruko, Magenta ends up feeling sorry for Neroalice and continues to indulge her until she gets worn out and takes her leave before Haruka's friends arrive.
7	"Azure in Trouble!"; Transliteration: "Gyakkyō Azūru" (Japanese: 逆境アズール)	Maki Kamiya	Noboru Kimura	Masato Suzuki	February 14, 2024
As Sayo grows concerned with how weird she has become following each encounter with Enormita, she joins Utena as she attends a magical girl exhibition. Determined to overcome her weakness, Azure decides to fight against Baiser alone, but still ultimately loses to her. Left broken by her defeat, Azure offers to swear loyalty to Baiser, but Utena becomes disgusted with Azure and rejects her, telling her to have more dignity as a magical girl. Meanwhile, Venalita tells the other members of Enormita about Baiser and the others.
8	"Here Comes the Lord Squad!"; Transliteration: "Rōdo-dan, Arawaru!" (Japanese: ロード団、現る！)	Aoi Mori	Noboru Kimura	Aoi Mori	February 21, 2024
Utena and the others are brought to NachtBase to meet the founding members of Enormita; Loco Musica, Leberblume, Sister Gigant and their leader, Lord Enorme. Disappointed with Venalita not taking world domination and hunting down magical girls seriously, Lord decides to betray Enormita and sends Sister, who can increase her size, to fight against Utena and Kiwi, forcing them to retreat due to Sister being too strong for them. As Utena recovers from the injuries sustained during her attack, Kiwi and Korisu are confronted by Loco, who wants to take over the world so she can become a pop idol. Loco's attempts to beat the pair fail when Kiwi rightfully points out that she is terrible at singing, allowing them to create an opportunity to escape while Loco is left to be punished by Lord. Meanwhile, Tres Magia have left the city to train so they can help Sayo.
9	"Gushing Over Pop Idols!"; Transliteration: "Aidoru ni Akogarete!" (Japanese: アイドルにあこがれて！)	Masato Suzuki	Yasunori Yamada	Kouta Amagi	February 28, 2024
While Tres Magia train to become stronger, Utena and the others are drawn out to a concert by Loco, where they are forced to fight against not only her but also Leberblume, who has the power to control others through their shadows. Despite initially being overwhelmed, Utena manages to capture Leber in Korisu's dollhouse in order to force Loco to cooperate, revealing the crowd attending Loco's concert were being forced to watch by Leber. Cooerced by Utena into performing in the nude, Loco discovers that she can actually sing well while being watched in an embarrassing state. Admitting defeat, Loco and Leber, aka Matama Akoya and Nemo Anemo, decide to switch sides to Utena's team.
10	"Loco x Leber"; Transliteration: "Roko × Rube" (Japanese: ロコ×ルベ)	Tomio Yamauchi	Noboru Kimura	Kazutaka Muraki	March 6, 2024
Wanting Matama and Nemo to repent for hunting down magical girls before officially joining her team, Utena traps them in an inescapable room sealed by magic. She stipulates that they will not be released until they "satisfy" her by expressing their hidden love for each other. At Utena's urging, Matama and Nemo kiss each other and ultimately have sex, with Nemo realizing the feelings she had harbored for Matama earlier in their relationship. Later, Lord sends her monsters, along with Sister, into town to attack Utena and the others. Sending Utena on ahead to Nachtbase to put a stop to Lord, Kiwi decides to fight against Sister alone, revealing she is much stronger than she had previously let on.
11	"Gushing Over World Domination!"; Transliteration: "Sekai Seifuku ni Akogarete!" (Japanese: 世界征服にあこがれて！)	Maki Kamiya	Yasunori Yamada	Aoi Mori & Kouta Amagi	March 13, 2024
Despite the toll using her full power takes on her body, Kiwi manages to outsmart Sister by using her second form, collapsing the ground beneath her and scaring her into submission. Elsewhere, Korisu, Matama and Nemo are rescued by Tres Magia, who don't know of their true identities, with Azure using a new power known as La Veritas to defeat Lord's monsters. Meanwhile, Lord seemingly overpowers Utena, but Utena turns the table by picturing Lord as a child and turning her own monsters against her, giving her a much stronger form. After being dealt a humiliating punishment by Utena, Lord is kicked out of Enormita by Venalita, who reveals that she was a pawn to make Utena and the others stronger. After having Sister eliminate Lord, Venalita appoints Utena as the new supreme commander of Enormita.
12	"Supreme Commander Magia Baiser Calls the Shots"; Transliteration: "Sōsui Majia Bēze no Ketsudan" (Japanese: 総帥マジアベーゼの決断)	Aoi Mori	Noboru Kimura	Aoi Mori	March 20, 2024
Utena, still perplexed by her sudden promotion to supreme commander, comes across Azure, who is helping Tres Magia rebuild the city following Lord's attacks. After giving Azure a massage for her hard work, Utena, relieved to see Azure has regained her resolve as a magical girl, decides that Enormita's goal going forward is to be the perfect villains for Tres Magia to fight against. On a later day, Utena and Kiwi take Korisu to a toy store where they come across Haruka and her little sisters. Korisu ends up getting too excited about her new toys and transforms into NeroAlice, setting loose a giant dinosaur toy while also forcing Magenta into a giant size to fight against it. Following some embarrassing torture from her teammates and enemies being in her clothing, Magenta defeats NeroAlice, Baiser, Leoparde, and the dinosaur toy by punching them into the sky as vengeance from being tortured as a little baby.
13	"Still Gushing over Magical Girls"; Transliteration: "Yappari Mahō Shōjo ni Akogarete" (Japanese: やっぱり魔法少女にあこがれて)	Masato Suzuki	Yasunori Yamada	Masato Suzuki	March 27, 2024
Utena and the others go on a trip to the beach, where Haruka and co. are also enjoying some time off. As the two groups play with each other, Utena tells Sayo about how she became a fan of Tres Magia. The fun is short-lived, however, as Kiwi ends up transforming to protect Utena from some rowdy customers, causing a fight between Enormita and Tres Magia to break out. Utena uses her power to transform an octopus, which indiscriminately attacks both friends and foes, but Azure manages to stop it before unveiling her new La Veritas form, Maiden of Hoarfrost. Baiser unveils her second form too to fight against Azure for glory. Azure, combining her inner masochism with a mind of ice, takes Enormita's attacks head on before returning them tenfold, sending them flying. With the fight over, all the girls enjoy the rest of their day at the beach. The next day, back in the city, the Tres Magia and Enormita are ready to fight for a showdown.

== Reception ==
In 2020, the manga was among 50 nominees for the 6th Next Manga Awards in the web category.
