= Now That We Draw =

Japanese manga series

- First tankōbon volume cover, featuring Niina Miyamoto

描くなるうえは (Kakunaru Ue wa)
- Genre: Coming-of-age; Romantic comedy
- Manga
- Written by: Kyu Takahata
- Illustrated by: Yuwji Kaba
- Published by: Hakusensha
- English publisher: NA: Seven Seas Entertainment
- Imprint: Young Animal Comics
- Magazine: Young Animal
- Original run: February 24, 2023 – present
- Volumes: 8
- Anime television series
- Directed by: Shunsuke Ishikawa
- Written by: Deko Akao
- Music by: Yoshiaki Miura
- Studio: Roll2
- Original run: January 2027 – scheduled
- icon

Now That We Draw (Japanese: 描くなるうえは, Hepburn: Kakunaru Ue wa) is a Japanese manga series written and illustrated by Kyu Takahata and illustrated by Yuwji Kaba. It has been serialized in Hakusensha's seinen manga magazine Young Animal since February 2023, with its chapters collected in eight tankōbon volumes as of September 2026. An anime television series adaptation produced by Roll2 is set to premiere in January 2027.

== Plot ==
Yuuki Uehara, a high school student and an aspiring manga artist, has created a manuscript of a romantic comedy starring its protagonist, Kiyone Shiraishi. When it is rejected by an editor for being unrealistic, Uehara is devastated. He soon encounters a popular classmate of his named Niina Miyamoto, who is also an aspiring manga artist. Revealing she received the same feedback from her editor, Miyamoto proposes that she and Uehara enter a fake relationship due to their inexperience. As such, they agree to act like a real couple so they will have enough material for their respective manga.

== Characters ==
Yuuki Uehara (上原 勇紀, Uehara Yūki)
Voiced by: Ayumu Murase
A high school student who dreams of becoming a manga artist.
Niina Miyamoto (宮本 仁衣奈, Miyamoto Niina)
Voiced by: Sayumi Suzushiro
A gyaru and Uehara's classmate who is also involved in making manga.

== Media ==
=== Manga ===
Written by Kyu Takahata and illustrated by Yuwji Kaba, Now That We Draw started in Hakusensha's seinen manga magazine Young Animal on February 24, 2023. Hakusensha has collected its chapters into individual tankōbon volumes, with the first one released on August 29, 2023. As of September 29, 2026, eight volumes have been released.

The series is licensed in English by Seven Seas Entertainment, which published the first volume in February 2025.

==== Volumes ====
No.	Original release date	Original ISBN	English release date	English ISBN
1	August 29, 2023	978-4-592-16656-6	February 4, 2025	979-8-89160-867-2
1. "I Can't Draw Based on Fiction" (フィクションなんかじゃ描けない, Fikushon Nanka ja Egakenai); 2. "I've Always Wanted to Talk About This" (ずっとこんな話がしたかった, Zutto Konna wa ga Shitakatta); 3. "The School at Night" (夜の学校, Yoru no Gakkō); 4. "Didn't Count" (Note: This chapter is titled "no count" in the Japanese version.); 5. "A Cheer for You" (エール, Ēru); 6. "A Stormy Night" (嵐の一夜, Arashi no Ichiya)
2	December 27, 2023	978-4-592-16657-3	June 10, 2025	979-8-89160-980-8
7. "Most in My Life" (人生で一番, Jinsei de Ichiban); 8. "Can't Look" (直視できない, Chokushi Dekinai); 9. "I Don't Want to Make Her a Liar" (ウソにしたくない, Uso ni Shitakunai); 10. "Assistants" (アシスタント, Ashisutanto); 11. "What Makes You Special" (特別なわけ, Tokubetsuna Wake); 12. "The Blues" (青い痛み, Aoi Itami); 13. "I..." (僕は, Boku wa)
3	June 28, 2024	978-4-592-16658-0	October 21, 2025	979-8-89373-707-3
14. "Practically Telling Her I Like Her" (好きって言ってるようなもの, Suki tte Itteru Yōna Mono); 15. "Surprise Attack" (不意打ち, Fuiuchi); 16. "That Annoying Sound" (うるさい音, Urusai Oto); 17. "After the Festival" (祭りのあと, Matsuri no Ato); 18. "My Type" (あたしのタイプ, Atashi no Taipu); 19. "Penpen-kun" (ペンペンくん); 20. "In Their Own World" (ふたりの世界, Futari no Sekai)
4	October 29, 2024	978-4-592-16659-7	February 24, 2026	979-8-89561-183-8
21. "Serene" (凪, Nagi); 22. "He's So..." (こんなに, Konnani); 23. "Newcomer Awards Ceremony" (新人賞授賞式, Shinjinshō Jushōshiki); 24. "Girls' Day Out" (ガールズデート, Gāruzu Dēto); 25. "Spineless Coward" (意気地なし, Ikuji Nashi); 26. "Like When We First Met" (出会った頃のように, Deatta Koro no Yō ni); 27. "Girl Talk" (ガールズトーク, Gāruzutōku)
5	April 28, 2025	978-4-592-16660-3	July 28, 2026	979-8-89765-170-2
28. "It Makes No Sense" (イミわかんない, Imi Wakannai); 29. "What Made Your Heart Race the Fastest" (一番ドキドキしたこと, Ichiban Doki Doki Shita Koto); 30. "I Super Can't Wait" (ちょー楽しみ, Chō Tanoshimi); 31. "Together" (二人なら, Futarinara); 32. "All Night"; 33. "Message"; 34. "Countdown" (カウントダウン, Kauntodaun)
6	November 28, 2025	978-4-592-16694-8	December 22, 2026	979-8-89863-220-5
35. Gyaru Nanoni (ギャルなのに); 36. Tomodachi (友達); 37. Uchi Demo (うちでも); 38. Chiisana Koi (小さな恋); 39. "Debut"; 40. Purezento (プレゼント); 41. Dotchi? (どっち?)
7	April 28, 2026	978-4-592-16697-9	—	—
42. Saikyō JK (最強JK); 43. "Run Run"; 44. Oyakusoku (お約束); 45. "Newcomer"; 46. Tanoshii? (楽しい?); 47. Sansen! Bukatsu Taikō Rirē (参戦! 部活対抗リレー); 48. Inparusu (インパルス)
8	September 29, 2026	978-4-592-16715-0	—	—
49. Chau Chau (ちゃうちゃう); 50. Gomakasanakute mo (ごまかさなくても); 51. "Rerise"; 52. Taisetsu na Koto (大切なこと); 53. Kimi no Senaka (きみの背中); 54. Afureru (溢れる); 55. Sorezore no Kimochi (それぞれのキモチ)

=== Anime ===
In November 2025, it was announced that the manga would receive an anime television series adaptation. It will be produced by Roll2 and directed by Shunsuke Ishikawa, with Deko Akao supervising and writing the series scripts, Hiromi Nakagawa designing the characters, and Yoshiaki Miura composing the music. The series is set to premiere in January 2027. The opening theme song is "Kimiiro Hikari" (キミイロヒラリ; lit. 'The Light of Your Color'), performed by Shallm.

== Reception ==
The series has been recommended by manga author Yusuke Nomura, with a comment featured on the obi of the first volume. It was also recommended by Minoru Toyoda with a comment featured on the obi of the second volume; the volume also includes supporting illustrations by Hajime Isayama, Yura Urushibara, Makoto Ojiro, Nao Emoto, and Keigo Maki. The manga was nominated for the tenth Next Manga Award in the print category in 2024. It was also nominated for the 2025 edition in the same category.
