= Misaki Ikeda =

Japanese voice actress

- 池田 海咲
- Born: 25 January
- Occupation: Voice actress
- Years active: 2014–present
- Employer: Ken Production
- Notable work: Chōfutsū-ken: Chiba Densetsu as Ako Shikawa; Gushing over Magical Girls as Kaoruko Tenkawa/Magia Sulfur; Love Is Indivisible by Twins as Reira Asano

Misaki Ikeda (Japanese: 池田 海咲, Hepburn: Ikeda Misaki; born 25 January) is a Japanese voice actress from Kyoto Prefecture, affiliated with Ken Production. She has starred as Ako Shikawa in Chōfutsū-ken: Chiba Densetsu, Kaoruko Tenkawa/Magia Sulfur in Gushing over Magical Girls, and Reira Asano in Love Is Indivisible by Twins.

== Biography ==
Misaki Ikeda, a native of Kyoto Prefecture, was born on 25 January, and educated at an all-girls school. Her father was an electrical worker and mother was a library worker.

Having studied performing arts and singing in her youth, Ikeda became interested in acting and enjoyed it so much that she began considering an acting career. She was eventually inspired to do a voice acting career by an older student at her junior high drama club who was a fan of voice acting, as well as her hobby of "reading books to understand the motivations of characters in stories". She was educated at School Duo, where she was part of their 15th upper class. She joined Ken Production on 1 April 2015.

Ikeda did voice acting work for the 2014 anime Bakumatsu Rock, before voicing characters in Aikatsu Stars!, Karakuri Circus, Pop Team Epic, Cardfight!! Vanguard: High School Arc Cont., Chihayafuru, Dragon Quest: The Adventure of Dai, and The Irregular at Magic High School, and Power of Hope: PreCure Full Bloom. In October 2023, it was announced that she would star as Kaoruko Tenkawa/Magia Sulfur in Gushing over Magical Girls. She also starred as Ako Shikawa in Chōfutsū-ken: Chiba Densetsu and Reira Asano in Love Is Indivisible by Twins.

Ikeda speaks kyō-kotoba and her specialties include Italia kakyokushū.

== Filmography ==
=== Television animation ===
| Year | Title | Role | Ref |
|---|---|---|---|
| 2014 | Bakumatsu Rock | | |
| 2016 | Aikatsu Stars! | | |
| 2016 | Crayon Shin-chan | | |
| 2016 | Kamisama Minarai: Himitsu no Cocotama | Shogo | |
| 2017 | Seven Mortal Sins | Earth | |
| 2017 | Vatican Miracle Examiner | Danny Glassen | |
| 2017 | Chiruran: Nibun no Ichi | Kyoto native | |
| 2018 | Karakuri Circus | | |
| 2018 | Pop Team Epic | Ayumu Ichinohashi | |
| 2018 | Sanrio Boys | Ruka, young Shunsuke | |
| 2019 | Cardfight!! Vanguard: High School Arc Cont. | Hexagonal Magus | |
| 2019 | Chihayafuru | Momo Yukawa | |
| 2019 | Given | | |
| 2020 | Dragon Quest: The Adventure of Dai | Monster, Maribee | |
| 2020 | Ikebukuro West Gate Park | Mion's mother | |
| 2020 | Wandering Witch: The Journey of Elaina | Sho | |
| 2021 | Fushigi Dagashiya Zenitendō | Mion Nakamura, Mina Nakamura, Non | |
| 2021 | The Irregular at Magic High School | Female student | |
| 2023 | Power of Hope: PreCure Full Bloom | Yumi | |
| 2024 | Chōfutsū-ken: Chiba Densetsu | Ako Shikawa | |
| 2024 | Gushing over Magical Girls | Kaoruko Tenkawa/Magia Sulfur | |
| 2024 | Kagaku × Bōken Survival! | Announcer | |
| 2024 | Love Is Indivisible by Twins | Reira Asano | |
| 2024 | Ranma ½ | Rhythmic gymnastics club member | |
| 2024 | Senpai Is an Otokonoko | Saki's homeroom teacher | |
| 2025 | Lazarus | Gangster | |
| 2025 | The Mononoke Lecture Logs of Chuzenji-sensei | Nami Kitamura | |

=== Animated film ===
| Year | Title | Role | Ref |
|---|---|---|---|
| 2017 | Lu Over the Wall | | |
| 2018 | Godzilla: The Planet Eater | | |
| 2018 | K: Seven Stories | | |
| 2019 | Pretty Cure Miracle Universe | Birdperson | |

=== Original net animation ===
| Year | Title | Role | Ref |
|---|---|---|---|
| 2020 | Pokémon: Twilight Wings | Children | |
| 2022 | Kakegurui Twin | Students | |

=== Original video animation ===
| Year | Title | Role | Ref |
|---|---|---|---|
| 2020 | Maidens – Tomoshibi | Tsugumi Ban | |

=== Video games ===
| Year | Title | Role | Ref |
|---|---|---|---|
| 2016 | SoulWorker | Xenia | |
| 2017 | Earth Defense Force 5 | Captain Spriggan | |
| 2017 | Mayonaka Qaran | White girl | |
| 2018 | Katana Maidens: Toji No Miko: Kizamishi Issen no Tomoshibi]] | Tsugumi Ban | |
| 2018 | Onmyoji | Kaguya-hime Frog, Yellow Imp | |
| 2020 | Final Fantasy VII Remake | | |
| 2020 | Valorant | Jett | |
| 2024 | Eiyuden Chronicle: Hundred Heroes | Air | |
| 2024 | Infinity Nikki | Fearless Freddie | |
| ? | Fantasy Life i: The Girl Who Steals Time | Singer of "Black Mud Prince" | |
| ? | Forever Seven Days | Xili | |
| ? | Genshin Impact | Hypatia, Ricardo | |
| ? | Granblue Fantasy | | |
