= Host to Shachiku =

Japanese manga series

- First tankōbon volume cover

ホストと社畜 (Hosuto to Shachiku)
- Genre: Drama; Slice of life
- Manga
- Written by: Mitsuru Kawajiri
- Published by: Futabasha
- Imprint: Action Comics
- Magazine: Manga Action
- Original run: January 4, 2024 – present
- Volumes: 5
- icon

Host to Shachiku (Japanese: ホストと社畜, Hepburn: Hosuto to Shachiku; lit. 'Host and Corporate Slave') is a Japanese manga series written and illustrated by Mitsuru Kawajiri. It began serialization in Futabasha's seinen manga magazine Manga Action in January 2024.

== Synopsis ==
Naoto Suzuki is a systems engineer headed to work, while Ren Sasaki is a host heading home from a club. The two often see each other at a beef bowl restaurant in Kabukicho for about fifteen minutes before heading out to their respective destinations, but have never uttered a word to each other. One day, after an incident involving Naoto's order, Ren offers to share his order with Naoto, and they start eating breakfast together.

== Characters ==
Ren Sasaki (佐々木蓮, Sasaki Ren)
Voiced by: Natsuki Hanae (voice comic, PV)
Naoto Suzuki (鈴木直人, Suzuki Naoto)
Voiced by: Taku Yashiro (voice comic, PV)

== Media ==
=== Manga ===
Written and illustrated by Mitsuru Kawajiri, Host to Shachiku began serialization in Futabasha's seinen manga magazine Manga Action on January 4, 2024. Its chapters have been compiled into five tankōbon volumes as of October 2026.

No.	Release date	ISBN
1	August 28, 2024	978-4-575-86001-6
2	April 10, 2025	978-4-575-86074-0
3	September 25, 2025	978-4-575-86138-9
4	March 26, 2026	978-4-575-86203-4
5	October 29, 2026	978-4-575-86280-5; 978-4-575-86281-2 (SE)

=== Other ===
In commemoration of the release of the second volume, a voice comic and promotional video were uploaded to Futabasha Comic YouTube channel on April 10, 2025. Both consisted of voice performances from Natsuki Hanae and Taku Yashiro.

== Reception ==
The series was ranked twentieth in the print category of the 11th Next Manga Awards in 2025. The series, alongside Within the Villainess, and Orizuru, was ranked eighth in the 2026 edition of Takarajimasha's Kono Manga ga Sugoi! guidebook's list of the best manga for female readers. The series, alongside Spacewalking with You, won the Men's Comic Prize at the 2026 Digital Comic Awards.
