= That Time I Got Reincarnated as a Slime (TV series) =

Japanese anime television series

- The series logo
- Also known as: The Slime Diaries: That Time I Got Reincarnated as a Slime (2021)
- 転生したらスライムだった件; Tensei Shitara Suraimu Datta Ken
- Genre: Adventure; Fantasy; Isekai
- Based on: That Time I Got Reincarnated as a Slime by Fuse
- Written by: Kazuyuki Fudeyasu (S1–2); Toshizo Nemoto (S3); Hitomi Ogawa (S4); Kotatsumikan (SD); Yūji Haibara (CR)
- Directed by: Yasuhito Kikuchi (S1); Atsushi Nakayama (S2–3); Atsushi Nakayama (S2–3); Naokatsu Tsuda (S4); Kentarō Sugimoto (CR); Slime Diaries: Yūji Haibara; Shin Tosaka (Note: Credited as Animation Director (アニメーションディレクター), a credit separate from Animation Director (作画監督), and one that denotes series director responsibilities, as confirmed through Keizou Shimizu and his work Legend of the Galactic Heroes.); Shintarō Inokawa
- Voices of: Miho Okasaki; Tomoaki Maeno
- Music by: Elements Garden; R.O.N (SD)
- Country of origin: Japan
- Original language: Japanese
- No. of seasons: 4
- No. of episodes: 96 + 5 OADs; 12 (SD); (list of episodes)

Production
- Executive producer: Bungo Kondō
- Producers: Yōhei Itō; Shigeto Sugimoto
- Cinematography: Hiroshi Satō
- Animator: Eight Bit
- Running time: 24 minutes
- Production company: Tensura Production Committee (Note: Label consisting of various companies.)

Original release
- Network: Tokyo MX, BS11, tvk, MBS (S1–2); NNS (Nippon TV), BS11 (S3–4)
- Release: October 2, 2018 – present
- Network: Tokyo MX, MBS, BS11, TV Aichi, TVh, TVQ, GYT, GTV, TUF, AT-X, Animax
- Release: April 6 – June 22, 2021
- Release: April 2027

Related
- Scarlet Bond; Tears of the Azure Sea
- Original net animation

Visions of Coleus
- Directed by: Atsushi Nakayama
- Written by: Toshizo Nemoto
- Music by: Hitoshi Fujima
- Studio: Eight Bit
- Released: November 1, 2023
- Episodes: 3

That Time I Got Reincarnated as a Slime (Japanese: 転生したらスライムだった件, Hepburn: Tensei Shitara Suraimu Datta Ken; lit. 'The Story of My Reincarnation as a Slime'), also known as Regarding Reincarnated to Slime and by the contraction TenSura (転スラ), is a Japanese fantasy anime television series based on the light novel series of the same name written by Fuse. Produced by Eight Bit, the series follows Satoru Mikami, a salaryman who is murdered and reincarnated in a fantasy world as a powerful slime named Rimuru Tempest.

Since its debut in 2018, the series has become a cornerstone of the Isekai genre, praised for its focus on nation-building and diplomacy rather than just combat. As of February 2026, the franchise has produced three television seasons, multiple OVAs, and two theatrical films. A fourth season, consisting of an unprecedented five-cour broadcast, premiered on April 3, 2026, following the release of the second film, Tears of the Azure Sea.

== Plot ==
Satoru Mikami is an ordinary 37-year-old corporate worker living in Tokyo. He is almost content with his monotonous life, despite the fact that he does not have a girlfriend. During a casual encounter with his colleague, an assailant tries to stab his friend, and Satoru pushes his friend out of the way and gets stabbed instead. While succumbing to his injuries, a mysterious voice echoes in his mind and asks a series of questions. In response to Satoru's answers, the voice grants him various gifts and powers to use in his next life.

After regaining consciousness, Satoru discovers that he has been reincarnated as a slime in an unfamiliar world. At the same time, he also acquires newfound skills, particularly the ability called "Predator", which allows them to devour anything and mimic its appearance and skills. He stumbles upon Veldora, a powerful 'Storm Dragon', who has been sealed for the last 300 years for reducing a town to ashes. Feeling sorry for him, Satoru befriends the dragon, promising to help him in destroying the seal. He decides to exchange names, Veldora bestows upon them the name Rimuru, and he receives the surname Tempest in return. Rimuru then consumes the dragon together with his prison in order to analyze the spell and eventually free Veldora. During their journey, he gains a human form after devouring a deceased human named Shizue Izawa.

The disappearance of Veldora's aura creates a power vacuum, which eventually makes Rimuru the leader of all beings inhabiting the Great Forest of Jura, who accept them as a ruler and together, they establish the nation of Tempest. With Rimuru's strength, wisdom, and idealistic vision, the new nation quickly grows in strength and influence. Soon Rimuru and their subjects draw the attention of nearby foreign powers, from monarchs and legendary heroes to demon lords, some seeking to become their allies, others intending to take advantage of or destroy them completely.

=== Season 1 ===
Satoru Mikami is reincarnated as a Slime after being stabbed. He meets the Storm Dragon Veldora and acquires the "Predator" and "Great Sage" skills. He organizes the goblins and direwolves into a unified village and meets a human named Shizue Izawa, whose appearance he eventually mimics after her passing.

Rimuru encounters the ogre survivors of a destroyed village (whom he names Benimaru, Shuna, Shion, Souei and Kurobe) and discovers a massive orc army invading. He defeats the orc Disaster Geld, absorbing his sins. This leads to the formal founding of the Jura Tempest Federation, a nation where monsters live in harmony.

The demon lord Milim Nava arrives in Tempest, seeking excitement. Rimuru "tames" her with food and friendship. They later defend the forest against the calamitous Charybdis, which was summoned by the Moderate Harlequin Alliance to destroy the city.

To fulfill Shizue's final wish, Rimuru travels to the Kingdom of Ingracia to teach her five "Otherworlder" students. He takes them to the Dwelling of Spirits, where they summon superior spirits to stabilize their overflowing mana and save their lives.

=== Season 2 ===
While Rimuru returns from Ingracia, he is ambushed by the holy knight Hinata Sakaguchi, who seeks to avenge Shizu and believes that Rimuru killed her. Simultaneously, the Kingdom of Falmuth and the Western Holy Church launch a surprise attack on Tempest, exploiting a barrier that weakens monsters.

Following his survival against Hinata, Rimuru returns to the city. Devastated by the death of Shion and many citizens, Rimuru learns he can resurrect them by becoming a demon lord. He annihilates the 20,000-strong Falmuth army with the spell "Megiddo" to trigger his Harvest Festival. He evolves into a true demon lord and summons the primordial demon Diablo, who becomes his servant.

Rimuru exposes demon lord Clayman's schemes at the Walpurgis banquet. After a one-sided battle where Rimuru defeats Clayman, the "Ten Great Demon Lords" are restructured into the Octagram. Veldora is formally reintroduced to the world.

=== Season 3 ===
Tempest enters a cold war with the Holy Empire of Lubelius. Miscommunications led by the Seven Days Clergy result in a second duel between Rimuru and Hinata. The conflict ends when the True Demon Lord Luminous Valentine intervenes, leading to a peace treaty.

To celebrate Tempest's new status, Rimuru hosts a world-class festival. He introduces the 100-floor Labyrinth (managed by Veldora and Ramiris) and befriends the "Chosen Hero" Masayuki. The arc focuses on the economic and cultural dominance of Tempest over the Western nations.

=== Season 4 ===
As Tempest refines the Labyrinth, the Council of the West extends an invitation to join. Expecting a trap, Rimuru attends the meeting and easily deflates an assassination attempt from the mysterious Rozzo family, a powerful faction among the Western Kingdoms, earning Tempest a spot on the Council.

When Rimuru and Milim investigate ruins beneath the castle of former Demon Lord Clayman, Granville, head of the Rozzo family, invites the Western Nations' guild creator and "Otherworlder" Yuuki Kagurazaka to defeat the two Demon Lords for the sake of humanity. Granville's idealistic granddaughter Maribel goes with Yuuki, who unleashes Milim's former pet, the Chaos Dragon. When Maribel is unable to defeat Rimuru, Yuuki betrays and kills her, returning to Granville, claiming the Demon Lords had done it. Together, Rumiru and Milim defeat the Chaos Dragon and reincarnate it as an egg for Milim to raise.

Tempest is invited to perform a concert in Lubelius as an act of friendship, but a combined assault on the city from the Rozzos and Moderate Harlequin Alliance, run by Yuuki, disrupt proceedings as they search for the "True Hero" sleeping within Luminus's castle. Similarly, influenced by Yuuki, Demon Lord Leon continues his search into Lubelius for an "Otherworlder" named Chloe, who had been under Tempest's protection. Fighting against Granville, Hinata is seemingly killed while Chloe, who arrived with Rimuru, suddenly disappears. Yuuki is successful in awakening the True Hero, named Chronoa, who unleashes her endless power.

Chronoa is revealed to the personification of Chloe's rage and grief as she has countlessly traveled to the past and lived out history in order to search for the "perfect timeline" where Rimuru, Hinata, and Luminus survive. In the present, Rimuru is able to enter Chronoa's soul, which also contains Hinata, Chloe, and Shizue, calming her down and reviving Hinata and Chloe while Luminus slays Granville.

== Series overview ==
Season	Episodes		Originally released	
Season	Episodes		First released	Last released
1	24		October 2, 2018	March 19, 2019
2	24	12	January 12, 2021	March 30, 2021
2	24	12	July 6, 2021	September 21, 2021
3	24		April 5, 2024	September 27, 2024
4	TBA	24	April 3, 2026	September 25, 2026
4	TBA	TBA	July 2027	TBA

== Production ==
=== Season 1 ===
An anime television series adaptation aired from October 2, 2018, to March 19, 2019, on Tokyo MX and other networks. (Note: Tokyo MX listed the broadcast times as Monday nights at 24:00, meaning the first broadcast technically occurred on Tuesday at midnight JST.) The series is animated by Eight Bit and directed by Yasuhito Kikuchi, with Atsushi Nakayama as assistant director, Kazuyuki Fudeyasu handling series composition, Ryouma Ebata designing the characters, and Takahiro Kishida providing monster designs. Elements Garden is composing the series' music. The first opening theme is "Nameless story", performed by Takuma Terashima, while the first ending theme is "Another colony", performed by True. The second opening theme is "Megurumono" (メグルモノ), performed by Terashima, while the second ending theme is "Little Soldier" (リトルソルジャー, Ritoru Sorujā), performed by Azusa Tadokoro. The series is simulcast by Crunchyroll, with Funimation streaming an English dub as it airs. The first season ran for 24 episodes.

=== Season 2 ===
A second season was announced to be a split-season anime, but the first half was delayed from October 2020 to January 2021, and the second half was delayed from April to July 2021 due to the effects of the COVID-19 pandemic in Japan. The first half aired from January 12 to March 30, 2021, and the second half aired from July 6 to September 21, 2021. Eight Bit animated the series, with the staff and cast members reprising their roles. The opening theme is "Storyteller", performed by True, while the ending theme is "Storyseeker", performed by Stereo Dive Foundation. The second opening theme is "Like Flames" performed by MindaRyn, while the second ending theme is "Reincarnate" performed by Takuma Terashima.

=== Season 3 ===
A third season was announced on November 9, 2022, and aired from April 5 to September 27, 2024, on the Friday Anime Night programming block on Nippon TV and its affiliates, as well as BS11. The staff from the second season and the Visions of Coleus ONA series are returning to reprise their roles. The first opening theme song is "Peacekeeper" performed by Stereo Dive Foundation, while the ending theme song is "Believer" performed by Rin Kurusu. The second opening theme song is "Renacer Serenade" (レナセールセレナーデ) performed by Momoiro Clover Z, while the second ending theme song is "Miracle Soup" performed by MindaRyn.

=== Season 4 ===
Following the airing of the third season's final episode, a fourth season has been announced, along with a second film. The fourth season is set to premiere 5 cours, with the first 2 cours airing from April 3 to September 25, 2026. The third cour is set to premiere in July 2027. The other two cours have no release dates yet. The first opening theme is "Esoragoto" (絵空事), performed by Eir Aoi, while the first ending theme is "Katsubō" (渇望), performed by CiON. The second opening theme is "Tactic", performed by Daoko, while the second ending theme is "Hymnal" (ヒムナル), performed by Azusa Tadokoro.

=== Spin-off and OADs/ONA ===
A spin-off anime series based on the Slime Diaries: That Time I Got Reincarnated as a Slime manga was scheduled to premiere in January 2021 but had been delayed to April 2021 due to COVID-19. The series aired from April 6 to June 22, 2021. Eight Bit also animated the series, with Yūji Haibara directing the series, Kotatsumikan writing the script, Risa Takai and Atsushi Irie as character designers, and R.O.N composing the music. The opening theme is "Brand new diary", performed by Akane Kumada.

An original animation DVD was originally scheduled to be released on March 29, 2019, bundled with the 11th manga volume, but it was delayed to December 4, 2019, bundled with the 13th manga volume. A second original animation DVD was released on July 9, 2019, bundled with the 12th manga volume. Three more original animation DVDs have been announced, with the third OAD being released on March 27, 2020, bundled with the 14th manga volume. The fourth OAD is being bundled with the 15th manga volume, which released on July 9, 2020. The fifth OAD was to be bundled with 16th manga volume, which released on November 9, 2020.

A three-episode original net animation (ONA) series, titled Visions of Coleus, was announced on February 19, 2023, and premiered on November 1, 2023. The staff from the second season reprised their roles along with Toshizo Nemoto handling series composition. The opening theme song is "Hikaru Hanatsu" performed by Takuma Terashima, while the ending theme song is performed by Miho Okasaki.

A second spin-off anime series based on the That Time I Got Reincarnated as a Slime: Clayman's Revenge manga is set to premiere in April 2027. Eight Bit is also animating the series, with Kentarō Sugimoto directing the series, Yūji Haibara writing the script, and Asumi Hashimoto and Hideki Sakai as character designers.

=== Films ===
Following the airing of the second season's final episode, it was announced that the series would receive an anime film, titled That Time I Got Reincarnated as a Slime the Movie: Scarlet Bond. The film premiered in Japan on November 25, 2022. Crunchyroll screened the film outside of Asia in early 2023. The second film, entitled Tears of the Azure Sea, premiered on February 27, 2026. Crunchyroll has acquired the worldwide theatrical rights for the film.

== Music ==
No.	Opening theme	Artist	Ending theme	Artist
1	"Nameless Story"	Takuma Terashima	"Another Colony"	TRUE
2	"Megurumono"	Takuma Terashima	"Little Soldier"	Azusa Tadokoro
3	"Storyteller"	TRUE	"Storyseeker"	Stereo Dive Foundation
4	"Like Flames"	MindaRyn	"Reincarnate"	Takuma Terashima
5	"Peacekeeper"	Stereo Dive Foundation	"Believer"	Rin Kurusu
6	"Renacer Serenade"	Momoiro Clover Z	"Miracle Soup"	MindaRyn
7	"Esoragoto"	Eir Aoi	"Katsubō"	CiON
8	"Tactic"	Daoko	"Hymnal"	Azusa Tadokoro

== Reception ==
In 2019, Rimuru Tempest won "Best Protagonist" at the 3rd Crunchyroll Anime Awards. The anime was also nominated for "Best Anime Series" at the IGN Awards in the same year. The second season won the award for "Best Fantasy" at the sixth edition in 2022. Rimuru Tempest's voice actor Rosie Yaziji, was nominated for "Best Voice Artist Performance (Arabic)" at the eighth edition in 2024. The third season was nominated for "Best Isekai Anime" at the ninth edition in 2025.

In May 2021, That Time I Got Reincarnated as a Slime was one of five isekai-oriented anime titles (along with KonoSuba, Zombie Land Saga, Princess Lover!, and Nekopara) that were given a limited ban by the Russian government for their depiction of reincarnation.
