= List of That Time I Got Reincarnated as a Slime episodes =

That Time I Got Reincarnated as a Slime is an anime television series based on Fuse's TenSura light novel series. The series follows a man who dies and is reincarnated in another world as a slime named Rimuru. The anime is produced by Eight Bit and directed by Yasuhito Kikuchi, with Atsushi Nakayama as assistant director, Kazuyuki Fudeyasu handling series composition, Ryouma Ebata designing the characters, and Takahiro Kishida providing monster designs. Elements Garden is composing the series' music. The 24-episode series aired from October 2, 2018, to March 19, 2019, on Tokyo MX and other networks. (Note: Tokyo MX listed the broadcast times as Monday nights at 24:00, meaning the first broadcast effectively occurred on Tuesday at 12:00 a.m. JST.) The anime series is simulcast by Crunchyroll, with Funimation streaming an English dub as it airs. An original animation DVD (OAD) was originally scheduled to be released on March 29, 2019, bundled with the 11th manga volume, but it was delayed to December 4, 2019, bundled with the 13th manga volume. A second original animation DVD released on July 9, 2019, bundled with the 12th manga volume. Three more original animation DVDs have been announced, with the third OAD being released on March 27, 2020, bundled with the 14th manga volume. The fourth OAD was bundled with the 15th manga volume, which released on July 9, 2020. The fifth OADs was bundled with 16th manga volume, which released on November 11, 2020.

A second season was announced to be a split-cour anime, and the first half was scheduled to premiere in October 2020, but has been delayed to January 2021 due to COVID-19. The second half was also delayed from April to July 2021. The first half aired from January 12 to March 30, 2021, and the second half aired from July 6 to September 21, 2021. Eight Bit returned to animate the series, with the staff and cast members reprising their roles.

A spin-off anime series based on the Slime Diaries: That Time I Got Reincarnated as a Slime manga was scheduled to premiere in January 2021 but was delayed to April 2021 due to COVID-19. The series aired from April 6 to June 22, 2021. Eight Bit also animated the series, with Yuji Ikuhara directing the series, Kotatsumikan writing the scripts, Risa Takai and Atsushi Irie as character designers, and R.O.N composing the music.

A three-episode original net animation (ONA) series, titled Visions of Coleus, was announced on February 19, 2023, and premiered on November 1, 2023. The staff from the second season reprised their roles along with Toshizo Nemoto handling series composition. The opening theme song, "Hikaru Hanatsu", is performed by Takuma Terashima, while the ending theme song is performed by Miho Okasaki.

A third season was announced in November 2022 and premiered on April 5, 2024, on the Friday Anime Night programming block on Nippon TV and its affiliates, as well as BS11. The staff from the second season and the Visions of Coleus ONA series are returning to reprise their roles.

Following the airing of the third season's final episode, a fourth season was announced, along with a second film. The second film was released on February 27, 2026, while the fourth season was released on April 3, 2026.

== Series overview ==
Season	Episodes		Originally released	
Season	Episodes		First released	Last released
1	24		October 2, 2018	March 19, 2019
2	24	12	January 12, 2021	March 30, 2021
2	24	12	July 6, 2021	September 21, 2021
3	24		April 5, 2024	September 27, 2024
4	TBA	24	April 3, 2026	September 25, 2026
4	TBA	TBA	July 2027	TBA

== Episodes ==
=== Season 1 (2018–19) ===
No. overall	No. in season	Title (Note: English translated titles are taken from Crunchyroll)	Directed by (Note: Production staff information is taken from the ending credits of each episode)	Storyboarded by	Chief animation directed by	Original release date
1	1	"The Storm Dragon, Veldora"; Transliteration: "Boufuu Ryuu Verudora" (Japanese: 暴風竜ヴェルドラ)	Atsushi Nakayama	Yasuhito Kikuchi	Ryōma Ebata	October 2, 2018
2	2	"Meeting the Goblins"; Transliteration: "Goburin-tachi to no Deai" (Japanese: ゴブリンたちとの出会い)	Shintaro Inokawa	Masashi Kojima	Ryōma Ebata	October 9, 2018
3	3	"Battle at the Goblin Village"; Transliteration: "Goburin Mura de no Tatakai" (Japanese: ゴブリン村での戦い)	Shin Tosaka	Takaomi Kanasaki	Junichi Takaoka	October 16, 2018
4	4	"In the Kingdom of the Dwarves"; Transliteration: "Dowāfu no Ōkoku Nite" (Japanese: ドワーフの王国にて)	Tokugane Tanizawa	Taizo Yoshida	Kenichirō Katsura	October 23, 2018
5	5	"Hero King, Gazel Dwargo"; Transliteration: "Eiyū-ō Gazeru・Dowarugo" (Japanese: 英雄王ガゼル・ドワルゴ)	Yoshihiro Mori	Junichi Takaoka	Junichi Takaoka	October 30, 2018
6	6	"Shizu" (Japanese: シズ)	Yasuhiro Ito	Masashi Kojima	Kenichirō Katsura	November 6, 2018
7	7	"Conqueror of Flames"; Transliteration: "Bakuen no Shihai-sha" (Japanese: 爆炎の支配者)	Atsushi Nakayama	Masashi Kojima	Kenichirō Katsura	November 13, 2018
8	8	"Inherited Will"; Transliteration: "Uketsugareru Omoi" (Japanese: 受け継がれる想い)	Takumi Dōyama	Katsumi Terahigashi	Takashi Mamezuka	November 20, 2018
9	9	"Attack of the Ogres"; Transliteration: "Dai Kizoku no Shūgeki" (Japanese: 大鬼族の襲撃)	Shin Tosaka	Katsumi Terahigashi	Junichi Takaoka	November 27, 2018
10	10	"The Orc Lord"; Transliteration: "Ōku Rōdo" (Japanese: オークロード)	Tokugane Tanizawa	Hidetoshi Namura	Kenichirō Katsura	December 4, 2018
11	11	"Gabiru Is Here!"; Transliteration: "Gabiru Sanjō!" (Japanese: ガビル参上！)	Yoshifumi Sasahara	Taizo Yoshida	Takashi Mamezuka	December 11, 2018
12	12	"The Gears Spin Out of Control"; Transliteration: "Kuruiyuku Haguruma" (Japanese: 狂いゆく歯車)	Yoshihiro Mori	Munenori Nawa	Takashi Mamezuka & Kenichirō Katsura	December 18, 2018
13	13	"The Great Clash"; Transliteration: "Dai Gekitotsu" (Japanese: 大激突)	Atsushi Nakayama	Shinji Itadaki	Kenichirō Katsura	December 25, 2018
14	14	"The One Who Devours All"; Transliteration: "Subete o Kurau Mono" (Japanese: 全てを喰らう者)	Yasuhiro Ito	Masashi Kojima	Takashi Mamezuka	January 8, 2019
15	15	"The Jura Forest Alliance"; Transliteration: "Jura no Mori Dai Dōmei" (Japanese: ジュラの森大同盟)	Akira Yamada	Katsumi Terahigashi	Junichi Takaoka	January 15, 2019
16	16	"Demon Lord Milim Attacks"; Transliteration: "Maō Mirimu Raishū" (Japanese: 魔王ミリム来襲)	Munenori Nawa	Yasuhito Kikuchi & Masashi Kojima	Kenichirō Katsura	January 22, 2019
17	17	"The Gathering"; Transliteration: "Tsudōsha-tachi" (Japanese: 集う者達)	Shin Tosaka	Masashi Kojima	Junichi Takaoka	January 29, 2019
18	18	"Evil Creeps Closer"; Transliteration: "Shinobiyoru Akui" (Japanese: 忍び寄る悪意)	Yoshihiro Mori	Masashi Kojima & Yasuhito Kikuchi	Kenichirō Katsura	February 5, 2019
19	19	"Charybdis"; Transliteration: "Karyubudisu" (Japanese: 暴風大妖渦(カリュブディス))	Atsushi Nakayama	Yasuhito Kikuchi & Risako Yoshida	Takashi Mamezuka	February 12, 2019
20	20	"Yuuki Kagurazaka" (Japanese: ユウキ・カグラザカ)	Tokugane Tanizawa	Masashi Kojima	Junichi Takaoka	February 19, 2019
21	21	"Shizu-san's Students"; Transliteration: "Shizu-san no Oshiego-tachi" (Japanese: シズさんの教え子達)	Ōri Yasukawa	Katsumi Terahigashi	Takashi Mamezuka	February 26, 2019
22	22	"Conquering the Labyrinth"; Transliteration: "Meikyū kōryaku" (Japanese: 迷宮攻略)	Shige Fukase	Shinji Itadaki	Hideki Sakai	March 5, 2019
23	23	"Saved Souls"; Transliteration: "Sukuwareru tamashii" (Japanese: 救われる魂)	Shin Tosaka	Masashi Kojima	Junichi Takaoka	March 12, 2019
24	24	"Black and a Mask"; Transliteration: "Gaiden: Kuro to Kamen" (Japanese: 外伝：黒と仮面)	Munenori Nawa	Shinji Itadaki	Ryōma Ebata	March 19, 2019

=== Season 2 (2021) ===
No. overall	No. in season	Title	Directed by	Storyboarded by	Chief animation directed by	Original release date
Part 1
25	1	"Rimuru's Busy Life"; Transliteration: "Rimuru no Isogashii Hibi" (Japanese: リムルの忙しい日々)	Munenori Nawa	Atsushi Nakayama & Ryōma Ebata	Tomoko Ito	January 12, 2021 (Note: Episode 25 and 26 were pre-screened on December 26, 2020 at 7:00 p.m. JST on d Anime Store.)
26	2	"Trade with the Animal Kingdom"; Transliteration: "Jū Ōkoku to no Kōeki" (Japanese: 獣王国との交易)	Daisuke Eguchi	Taizo Yoshida	Keiya Nakano	January 19, 2021
27	3	"Paradise, Once More"; Transliteration: "Rakuen, Futatabi" (Japanese: 楽園、再び)	Shō Kitamura	Satoshi Shimizu	Hideki Sakai	January 26, 2021
28	4	"The Scheming Kingdom of Falmuth"; Transliteration: "Bōryaku no Farumusu Ōkoku" (Japanese: 謀略のファルムス王国)	Akira Katō	Masashi Kojima	Yūichi Tanaka	February 2, 2021
29	5	"Prelude to the Disaster"; Transliteration: "Saiyaku no Zensōkyoku" (Japanese: 厄災の前奏曲)	Shunji Yoshida	Taizo Yoshida	Tomoko Ito	February 9, 2021
30	6	"The Beauty Makes Her Move"; Transliteration: "Ugokidasu Reijin" (Japanese: 動き出す麗人)	Shunsuke Ishikawa	Satoshi Shimizu & Masashi Kojima	Keiya Nakano & Hideki Yamazaki	February 16, 2021
31	7	"Despair"; Transliteration: "Zetsubō" (Japanese: 絶望)	Munenori Nawa, Daishi Katō & Takahiro Tanaka	Satoshi Shimizu	Yūichi Tanaka, Tomoko Ito & Keiya Nakano	February 23, 2021
32	8	"Hope"; Transliteration: "Kibō" (Japanese: 希望)	Kazuto Fujiwara	Shinji Itadaki	Yūichi Tanaka, Tomoko Ito & Hideki Sakai	March 2, 2021
33	9	"Putting Everything on the Line"; Transliteration: "Subete o Kakete" (Japanese: 全てを賭けて)	Shigeru Fukase	Shinji Itadaki	Hideki Sakai	March 9, 2021
34	10	"Megiddo"; Transliteration: "Megido" (Japanese: 神之怒(メギド))	Daisuke Eguchi	Satoshi Shimizu	Keiya Nakano & Hideki Sakai	March 16, 2021
35	11	"Birth of a Demon Lord"; Transliteration: "Maō Tanjō" (Japanese: 魔王誕生)	Shō Kitamura	Satoshi Shimizu	Yūichi Tanaka, Tomoko Ito & Hideki Sakai	March 23, 2021
36	12	"The One Unleashed"; Transliteration: "Tokihanatareshi Mono" (Japanese: 解き放たれし者)	Shunsuke Ishikawa	Satoshi Shimizu	Hideki Sakai, Keiya Nakano, Yūichi Tanaka & Tomoko Ito	March 30, 2021
Part 2
37	13	"The Visitors"; Transliteration: "Otozureru Mono-tachi" (Japanese: 訪れる者たち)	Atsushi Nakayama	Satoshi Shimizu	N/A	July 6, 2021 (Note: This episode was pre-screened on July 5, 2021 on d Anime Store.)
38	14	"A Meeting of Humans and Monsters"; Transliteration: "Jinma Kaidan" (Japanese: 人魔会談)	Ken Sanuma	Shinji Itadaki	Tomoko Ito	July 13, 2021
39	15	"Ramiris's Warning"; Transliteration: "Ramirisu no Shirase" (Japanese: ラミリスの報せ)	Ryōsuke Azuma	Masashi Kojima	Hideki Sakai, Keiya Nakano & Tomoko Ito	July 20, 2021
40	16	"The Congress Dances"; Transliteration: "Kaigi wa Odoru" (Japanese: 会議は踊る)	Ryō Nakamura	Masashi Kojima	Keiya Nakano, Yūichi Tanaka, Hideki Yamazaki, Hideki Sakai & Masahiko Komino	July 27, 2021
41	17	"The Eve of Battle"; Transliteration: "Kaisen Zen'ya" (Japanese: 会戦前夜)	Kazuto Fujiwara	Satoshi Shimizu	Keiya Nakano, Yūichi Tanaka, Hideki Yamazaki, Hideki Sakai & Masahiko Komino	August 3, 2021
42	18	"The Demon Lords"; Transliteration: "Maō-tachi" (Japanese: 魔王たち)	Ken Sanuma	Satoshi Shimizu	Tomoko Ito	August 10, 2021
43	19	"The Signal to Begin the Banquet"; Transliteration: "Kaien no Aizu" (Japanese: 開宴の合図)	Munenori Nawa	Taizo Yoshida	Keiya Nakano, Hideki Sakai, Yūichi Tanaka, Hideki Yamazaki & Masahiko Komino	August 17, 2021
44	20	"On This Land Where It All Happened"; Transliteration: "Innen no Chi de" (Japanese: 因縁の地で)	Shō Kitamura	Masashi Kojima	Keiya Nakano, Hideki Sakai, Yūichi Tanaka, Hideki Yamazaki & Masahiko Komino	August 24, 2021
45	21	"Adalmann, the Index Finger"; Transliteration: "Jishi no Adaruman" (Japanese: 示指のアダルマン)	Shigeru Fukase	Satoshi Shimizu	Hideki Sakai, Keiya Nakano, Hideki Yamazaki, Yūichi Tanaka, Masahiko Komino & Yasuhito Kikuchi	August 31, 2021
46	22	"Demon Lords' Banquet: Walpurgis"; Transliteration: "Maō-tachi no Utage ～Warupurugisu～" (Japanese: 魔王達の宴 〜ワルプルギス〜)	Takahiro Enokida	Satoshi Shimizu	Tomoko Ito & Hideki Yamazaki	September 7, 2021
47	23	"Returning from the Brink"; Transliteration: "Kishikaisei" (Japanese: 起死回生)	Munenori Nawa	Satoshi Shimizu	Hideki Sakai, Tomoko Ito, Keiya Nakano, Hideki Yamazaki, Yūichi Tanaka, Yasuhito Kikuchi & Masahiko Komino	September 14, 2021
48	24	"Octagram"; Transliteration: "Okutaguramu" (Japanese: 八星魔王(オクタグラム))	Daisuke Eguchi	Satoshi Shimizu	Hideki Sakai, Tomoko Ito, Hideki Yamazaki, Keiya Nakano, Yūichi Tanaka & Masahiko Komino	September 21, 2021

=== Season 3 (2024) ===
No. overall	No. in season	Title	Directed by	Written by	Storyboarded by	Original release date
49	1	"Demons and Strategies"; Transliteration: "Akuma to Sakubō" (Japanese: 悪魔と策謀)	Satoshi Ōsedo	Toshizo Nemoto	Masashi Kojima	April 5, 2024
50	2	"The Saint's Intentions"; Transliteration: "Seijin no Omowaku" (Japanese: 聖人の思惑)	Chen Xiaocan	Toshizo Nemoto	Masashi Kojima	April 12, 2024
51	3	"Peaceful Days"; Transliteration: "Heiwana Hibi" (Japanese: 平和な日々)	Tomio Yamauchi	Toshizo Nemoto	Shinji Itadaki	April 19, 2024
52	4	"Everyone Has a Part to Play"; Transliteration: "Sorezore no Yakuwari" (Japanese: それぞれの役割)	Tomio Yamauchi	Shingo Irie	Taizo Yoshida	April 26, 2024
53	5	"Meeting of Both Sides"; Transliteration: "Ryōyoku Kaigi" (Japanese: 両翼会議)	Masaharu Tomoda	Okumura Junichirō	Masashi Kojima	May 3, 2024
54	6	"Those Approaching"; Transliteration: "Semari Kuru Mono-tachi" (Japanese: 迫り来る者達)	Chen Xiaocan	Toshizo Nemoto	Shinji Itadaki	May 10, 2024
55	7	"Saint and Demon Clash"; Transliteration: "Seima Gekitotsu" (Japanese: 聖魔激突)	Satoshi Ōsedo	Shingo Irie	Satoshi Ōsedo & Hideki Yamazaki	May 17, 2024
56	8	"Misunderstanding"; Transliteration: "Botan no Kake Chigai" (Japanese: ボタンのかけ違い)	Yasushi Muroya	Okumura Junichirō	Satoshi Shimizu	May 24, 2024
57	9	"The Scheming of the Seven Days"; Transliteration: "Shichiyō Anyaku" (Japanese: 七曜暗躍)	Masahiko Suzuki	Tatsuto Higuchi	Ken Ōtsuka	May 31, 2024
58	10	"God and Demon Lord"; Transliteration: "Kami to Maō" (Japanese: 神と魔王)	Daisuke Tsukushi	Toshizo Nemoto	Kenta Mimuro	June 7, 2024
59	11	"Reconciliation and Agreement"; Transliteration: "Wakai to Kyōtei" (Japanese: 和解と協定)	Naokatsu Tsuda & Neito Hirohara	Toshizo Nemoto	Masashi Kojima	June 14, 2024
60	12	"Festival Preparations"; Transliteration: "Kaisai Junbi" (Japanese: 開催準備)	Takaaki Wada	Shingo Irie	Takaaki Wada	June 21, 2024
61	13	"Invitations for All Nations"; Transliteration: "Kakkoku to Shōtaijō" (Japanese: 各国と招待状)	Yasushi Muroya	Okumura Junichirō	Yasushi Muroya	June 28, 2024
62	14	"Labyrinth and Storm Dragon"; Transliteration: "Meikyū to Bōfū Ryū" (Japanese: 迷宮と暴風竜)	Chen Xiaocan	Tatsuto Higuchi	Gō Kurosaki	July 5, 2024
63	15	"Audience"; Transliteration: "Ekkenshiki" (Japanese: 謁見式)	Satoshi Ōsedo	Toshizo Nemoto	Satoshi Shimizu	July 19, 2024
64	16	"Benimaru's Ordeal"; Transliteration: "Benimaru no Junan" (Japanese: ベニマルの受難)	Daisuke Tsukushi	Shingo Irie	Daisuke Tsukushi	July 26, 2024
65	17	"The Lightspeed Hero"; Transliteration: "Senkō no Yūsha" (Japanese: 閃光の勇者)	Hitomi Ezoe	Tatsuto Higuchi	Futoshi Higashide	August 2, 2024
66	18	"A Throng of Visitors"; Transliteration: "Senkyaku Banrai" (Japanese: 千客万来)	Migmi	Okumura Junichirō	Chihiro Nitta	August 16, 2024
67	19	"Festival Eve"; Transliteration: "Zen'yasai" (Japanese: 前夜祭)	Atsushi Nakayama	Toshizo Nemoto	Chihiro Nitta	August 23, 2024
68	20	"Nation's Opening Festival"; Transliteration: "Kaikoku-sai" (Japanese: 開国祭)	Satoshi Ōsedo	Shingo Irie	Chihiro Nitta & Kiyoshi Okuyama	August 30, 2024
69	21	"The Martial Arts Tournament"; Transliteration: "Butō Taikai" (Japanese: 武闘大会)	Yasushi Muroya	Tatsuto Higuchi	Ken Ōtsuka	September 6, 2024
70	22	"Settling the Score with the Hero"; Transliteration: "Yūsha to no Ketchaku" (Japanese: 勇者との決着)	Natsumi Suzuki	Okumura Junichirō	Masashi Kojima	September 13, 2024
71	23	"The Labyrinth Is Opened"; Transliteration: "Meikyū Kaihō" (Japanese: 迷宮開放)	Naokatsu Tsuda	Shingo Irie	Naokatsu Tsuda & Neito Hirohara	September 20, 2024
72	24	"After the Festival"; Transliteration: "Matsuri no Ato" (Japanese: 祭の後)	Daisuke Tsukushi	Tatsuto Higuchi	Masashi Kojima	September 27, 2024

=== Season 4 (2026) ===
No. overall	No. in season	Title	Directed by	Written by	Storyboarded by	Original release date
73	1	"New Days"; Transliteration: "Atarashī Hibi" (Japanese: 新しい日々)	Unknown	Unknown	TBA	April 3, 2026
74	2	"The Dungeon Evolves"; Transliteration: "Shinka suru Meikyū" (Japanese: 進化する迷宮)	Unknown	Unknown	TBA	April 10, 2026
75	3	"The Avatar Team is Formed"; Transliteration: "Karimatai Chīmu Kessei" (Japanese: 仮魔体チーム結成)	Unknown	Unknown	TBA	April 17, 2026
76	4	"Invitation"; Transliteration: "Shōtaijō" (Japanese: 招待状)	Unknown	Unknown	TBA	April 24, 2026
77	5	"The First Step"; Transliteration: "Saisho no Ippo" (Japanese: 最初の一歩)	Unknown	Unknown	TBA	May 8, 2026
78	6	"The Council of the West"; Transliteration: "Seihō Shokoku Hyōgikai" (Japanese: 西方諸国評議会)	Unknown	Unknown	TBA	May 15, 2026
79	7	"The Mastermind's Identity"; Transliteration: "Kuromaku no Shōtai" (Japanese: 黒幕の正体)	Unknown	Unknown	TBA	May 22, 2026
80	8	"The Groundwork of Greed"; Transliteration: "Gōyoku no Fuseki" (Japanese: 強欲の布石)	Unknown	Unknown	TBA	May 29, 2026
81	9	"Investigating the Ruins"; Transliteration: "Iseki Chōsa" (Japanese: 遺跡調査)	Unknown	Unknown	TBA	June 5, 2026
82	10	"The Master of Greed"; Transliteration: "Gōyoku no Shujin" (Japanese: 強欲の主人)	Unknown	Unknown	TBA	June 12, 2026
83	11	"Milim's Friend"; Transliteration: "Mirimu no Tomodachi" (Japanese: ミリムの友達)	Unknown	Unknown	TBA	June 19, 2026
84	12	"Tempest Evolves"; Transliteration: "Shinka Suru Makokurenpō" (Japanese: 進化する魔国連邦)	Unknown	Unknown	TBA	June 26, 2026
85	13	"New Companions"; Transliteration: "Atarashī Nakamatachi" (Japanese: 新しい仲間達)	Unknown	Unknown	TBA	July 3, 2026
86	14	"The Black Numbers"; Transliteration: "Burakku Nanbāzu" (Japanese: 黒色軍団(ブラックナンバーズ))	Unknown	Unknown	TBA	July 10, 2026
87	15	"An Unsettling Feeling"; Transliteration: "Fuon'na Kehai" (Japanese: 不穏な気配)	Unknown	Unknown	TBA	July 17, 2026
88	16	"Gran, the Hero of Dawn"; Transliteration: "Yoake no Yūsha Guran" (Japanese: 夜明けの勇者グラン)	Unknown	Unknown	TBA	July 24, 2026
89	17	"Lubelius, the Point of Convergence"; Transliteration: "Shūsoku no ji Ruberiosu" (Japanese: 集束の地ルベリオス)	Unknown	Unknown	TBA	August 7, 2026
90	18	"Turbulence in the West"; Transliteration: "Nishikata Dōran" (Japanese: 西方動乱)	Unknown	Unknown	TBA	August 14, 2026
91	19	"Death and Disappearance/Death and Loss"; Transliteration: "Shi to Shōshitsu" (Japanese: 死と消失)	Unknown	Unknown	TBA	August 21, 2026
92	20	"Chronoa the Hero, Part One"; Transliteration: "Yūsha Kuronoa Zenpen" (Japanese: 勇者クロノア・前編)	Unknown	Unknown	TBA	August 28, 2026
93	21	"Chronoa the Hero, Part Two"; Transliteration: "Yūsha Kuronoa Kōhen" (Japanese: 勇者クロノア・後編)	TBA	TBA	TBA	September 4, 2026
94	22	"Where the Soul Resides"; Transliteration: "Tamashī no Arika" (Japanese: 魂の在処)	TBA	TBA	TBA	September 11, 2026
95	23	"Granville's Hope"; Transliteration: "Guranberu no Kibō" (Japanese: グランベルの希望)	TBA	TBA	TBA	September 18, 2026
96	24	"The Awakening of the Hero"; Transliteration: "Yūsha Kakusei" (Japanese: 勇者覚醒)	TBA	TBA	TBA	September 25, 2026

== The Slime Diaries (2021) ==
A more light hearted series showing the day-to-day lives of those in Tempest; taking place in the gaps between major events.

No.	Title	Directed by	Storyboarded by	Chief animation directed by	Original release date
1	"The Residents of the City of Monsters"; Transliteration: "Mamono no Machi no Jūnin-tachi" (Japanese: 魔物の町の住人たち)	Shintaro Inokawa	Yūji Haibara & Shintaro Inokawa	Atsushi Irie & Kazuaki Morita	April 6, 2021
Rimuru decides to keep a diary of the adventures experienced in this new world, remembering the trials and the friends made along the way. With the monster city growing, Rimuru and the council hold a meeting to help bring up everyone's morale. The Oni, Orcs, and Dragonewts enjoy their new lives under Rimuru's leadership.
2	"The Air in Spring and..." Transliteration: "Haru no Kūki to" (Japanese: 春の空気と)	Kōsuke Hirota	Shintaro Inokawa, Lone Claire & Akihiro Ino	Atsushi Irie & Kazuaki Morita	April 13, 2021
Rimuru gets to enjoy a rare break from work in Rimuru City, but quickly returns to old duties as boredom sets in. The inhabitants plough the fields and plant crops, including rice, to improve the city's food variety and production. Geld learns to appreciate the value of the less physically demanding gardening jobs, while Dryad Treyni is upset she didn't get invited to participate in the seeding.
3	"Summer in Jura"; Transliteration: "Jura no Natsu" (Japanese: ジュラの夏)	Shin Tosaka & Hiroshi Tamada	Shintaro Inokawa & Shin Tosaka	Atsushi Irie & Kazuaki Morita	April 20, 2021
As summer arrives, its heat is causing exhaustion among the city's working population. To cool down, Rimuru enjoys some activities in the forest with a group of Hobgoblins, including bug-catching and a water fight. Back in the city, Benimaru takes part in an endurance contest to see who can best take the heat, but is taken out by Shion's cooking. Later in the evening, Rimuru enjoys a refreshing drink in Treyni's bar before heading to a lake lit up by fireflies.
4	"A Day in a Swimsuit"; Transliteration: "Mizugi de Ichinichi" (Japanese: 水着で一日)	Yūsuke Yamamoto	Yūsuke Yamamoto	Atsushi Irie & Kazuaki Morita	April 27, 2021
Accompanied by the Kijin, Gobta, Ranga, and Souka, Rimuru takes some time off at the beach. Shion and Shuna enjoy games on the beach with Rimuru, while Hakurou spends his time fishing with Gobta. Treyni and Gabiru are disappointed they weren't taken along, but Treyni joins the group anyway under the pretense of an inspection. Souka and Souei confide in their friends about their relationship with each other.
5	"Return of the Summer Festival"; Transliteration: "Saigen Natsu Matsuri" (Japanese: 再現ナツマツリ)	Shin Tosaka	Shin Tosaka & Satoshi Shimizu	Atsushi Irie, Kazuaki Morita, Hideki Yamazaki & Risa Takai	May 4, 2021
Preparations are made for a Japanese-style summer festival in Tempest. Rimuru is creeped out by the usage of masks in his likeness, but is delighted, along with everyone else, with both the food served and games played at the stalls. The festival ends with a dance performance by the Dragonewts, a parade featuring Rimuru, and a fireworks show.
6	"Changes"; Transliteration: "Utsuroikawaru" (Japanese: うつろいかわる)	Shige Fukase	Masashi Kojima	Miyuki Nakayama	May 11, 2021
As the spirit of Shizu enters the village, the Bon Festival is announced, a festival to connect with your own kin and ancestors. Many townsfolk reminisce about the past. A number of changes that the Kijin have undergone after their evolution are highlighted. Shizu is embarrassed by both people's memories of her, and the outfits worn by Rimuru in the human form that resembles her.
7	"Here Comes the Demon Lord!"; Transliteration: "Maō ga Kita!" (Japanese: 魔王が来た！)	Shintaro Inokawa	Tomomi Mochizuki	Yūichi Tanaka & Keiya Nakano	May 18, 2021
Milim writes her own diary entry. After enjoying some food with Rimuru and the Kijin, she runs into Ranga and Gobta in town before returning for more snacks. To learn about the simple pleasantries in life, she watches Geld do construction work. In the evening, she rests while being carried on Rimuru's back, who has to repair the damage Milim's caused with her reckless behavior.
8	"A Fruitful Autumn"; Transliteration: "Minori no Aki" (Japanese: みのりの秋)	Kazuo Miyake	Shin Tosaka, Matsuo Youko & Takayuki Tanaka	Atsushi Irie, Kazuaki Morita & Risa Takai	May 25, 2021
Autumn arrives, and the citizens, supervised by Ririna, work together to harvest the crops planted in spring. Shion and Milim have potato-harvesting contests, while Treyni shows great fondness for the tubers, revealing she was born from a potato. The harvesters all enjoy their roasted sweet potatoes and gathered fruit. Treyni makes off with a supply of potatoes, planning to fry them and serve them at her bar.
9	"The Arrival of Winter"; Transliteration: "Fuyu no Otozure" (Japanese: 冬のおとずれ)	Ryō Nakamura	Masashi Kojima	Yukiyo Komito & Atsushi Irie	June 1, 2021
Winter is around the corner, so as the temperature drops, Milim finds enjoyment in resting under a kotatsu. Shuna prepares for winter by handing out personalised clothes to Rimuru and Benimaru. A delegation from Blumund makes their way to Rimuru City meeting Youm's party along the way, but they are mostly interested in Tempest's meat and potato chips. Youm tries to get used to the differences between monsters and humans.
10	"Snow Blankets the City of Monsters"; Transliteration: "Mamono no Machi no Yukigeshō" (Japanese: 魔物の町の雪化粧)	Noriyoshi Sasaki	Satoshi Shimizu & Masashi Kojima	Atsushi Irie, Kazuaki Morita & Risa Takai	June 8, 2021
Tempest sees its first snow, and a team is assembled to shovel the city's streets. After a snowball fight, Milim builds a Kamakura shaped like Rimuru where they eat sweets with some of the town's children. To warm up, Rimuru enjoys a hot spring bath built by Souei, accompanied by Shion, Shuna, Milim and Eren.
11	"Where Is Santa Claus?"; Transliteration: "Santa Kurōsu wa Doko ni Iru" (Japanese: サンタクロースはどこにいる)	Kazuo Miyake & Munenori Nawa	Masashi Kojima & Shin Tosaka	Atsushi Irie & Kazuaki Morita	June 15, 2021
Rimuru introduces Santa Claus to Tempest and has the dwarves help him set up a Christmas festival, complete with a tree and Santa outfits. Together with Milim, they get to enjoy a fancy Christmas dinner. Eren performs a Christmas song on stage with the children's choir. At the gift exchange, Rimuru is the intended recipient for many of the city's presents.
12	"Enjoying New Year's to the Fullest"; Transliteration: "Shōgatsu o Mankitsu" (Japanese: 正月を満喫)	Shigeru Fukase	Tomomi Mochizuki & Shintaro Inokawa	Atsushi Irie, Risa Takai & Kazuaki Morita	June 22, 2021
Festivities are held around the Japanese New Year. Rimuru performs an act of worship at the first shrine visit before learning that Rimuru is himself the deity revered at the shrine. A body double is left at the shrine to greet the line of visitors. Geld, Kurobe and three Hobgoblins form a team to make mochi, while Shion can barely enjoy dinner with the Kijin after losing to Milim in badminton and having her face inked black as punishment.

== Visions of Coleus (2023) ==
A three episode-OVA that takes place between seasons 1 and 2.

No.	Title	Directed by	Storyboarded by	Chief animation directed by	Original release date
1	"To Coleus"; Transliteration: "Koriusu Koku e" (Japanese: コリウス国へ)	Daisuke Tsukushi	Masashi Kojima	Tomoko Ito	November 1, 2023
Yuuki asks Rimuru to investigate the Kingdom of Coleus, where a battle for succession has pitted the kingdom's two princes against each other. Rimuru launches a covert operation to sneak into Coleus and find out what's driving this conflict.
2	"Great Phantom Thief Satoru"; Transliteration: "Dai Kaitō Satoru" (Japanese: 大怪盗サトル)	Michita Shiraishi	Satoshi Shimizu	Tomoko Ito & Sinomin	November 1, 2023
Aslan visits Rimuru to thank him for saving his sister, Zenobia. They discuss her illness and Souther's behavior, and begin to suspect that the court physician, Gustav, is behind both. Rimuru dons yet another disguise to investigate further.
3	"Purple and Roses"; Transliteration: "Murasaki to Bara" (Japanese: 紫と薔薇)	Daisuke Tsukushi	Ken Ōtsuka	Tomoko Mori	November 1, 2023
Rimuru confirms that it was Gustav who cursed Zenobia with illness. It turns out he and his accomplice, Carl, are Archdemons plotting to manifest their god using Zenobia as a vessel. Can Rimuru stop them before the Kingdom of Coleus is lost?

== OVAs (2019–20) ==
The first two OVAs take place in between the major events and the others take place between season 1 and the OVA season.

No.	Title	Directed by	Storyboarded by	Chief animation directed by	Original release date
1	"The Tragedy of M?"; Transliteration: "Gaiden: Emu no Higeki?" (Japanese: 外伝：Mの悲劇？)	Shintaro Inokawa	Masashi Kojima	Takashi Mamezuka	July 9, 2019
Sick of Shion and Shuna's tug-a-war for his attention, Rimuru decides to make a cushion in his image. Acquiring spandex for the exterior, Rimuru is stumped on a substitute for Styrofoam pellets. Learning of a special sand that's similar, Rimuru takes a group to a lake to collect it. After avoiding Shion's cooking, Rimuru leads everyone in a swim to collect the sand. They are attacked by a monster that was driven insane by a rice ball Shion made; its slime dissolves everyone's swimsuits, and Rimuru settles the problem. Despite the success of the Rimuru cushions, Shion and Shuna continue Rimuru's tortuous tug-a-war; Benimaru and Souei can only pity their master.
2	"Hey! Butts!"; Transliteration: "Gaiden: Hē! Shiri!" (Japanese: 外伝：HEY！尻！)	Makoto Nakata	Taizo Yoshida	Takashi Mamezuka	December 4, 2019 (Note: Unspecified production delays led to OAD1 being released much later than scheduled.)
Rimuru teaches the citizens of Tempest about sumo wrestling.
3	"Rimuru's Glamorous Life as a Teacher, Part 1"; Transliteration: "Gaiden: Rimuru no Karei na Kyōshi Seikatsu Sono 1" (Japanese: 外伝：リムルの華麗な教師生活 その1)	Atsushi Nakayama	Taizo Yoshida	Hideki Sakai	March 26, 2020
Rimuru, who is teaching Shizu's students as a substitute at the Kingdom of Ingrassia's Freedom Academy, takes part in an orientation in actual field combat in the school's annual outdoor training event. Transfixed by the prize he gets if he wins, he accepts a challenge from the teacher Jeff. However, an enemy appears before the students...
4	"Rimuru's Glamorous Life as a Teacher, Part 2"; Transliteration: "Gaiden: Rimuru no Karei na Kyōshi Seikatsu Sono 2" (Japanese: 外伝：リムルの華麗な教師生活 その2)	Shige Fukase	Shinji Itadaki	Hideki Sakai	July 9, 2020
Rimuru, now a teacher at the Freedom Academy in the Kingdom of Ingrassia, has become involved in the school's outdoor training event with his class. The outdoor training event is an annual competition in which the students of each class guard the teachers on a journey to a nearby town. Rimuru is assigned to Class A, while his own students in Class S escort the young Tiss-sensei. All the students are eager to show how much their daily training has paid off, but the situation turns around when they're attacked by thieves!
5	"Rimuru's Glamorous Life as a Teacher, Part 3"; Transliteration: "Gaiden: Rimuru no Karei na Kyōshi Seikatsu Sono 3" (Japanese: 外伝：リムルの華麗な教師生活 その3)	Ōri Yasukawa	Shinji Itadaki	Tomoko Ito, Keiya Nakano & Hideki Sakai	November 27, 2020
Tiss and the Class S students have made it through the first exercise of the Freedom Academy's annual outdoor training event. Class S has arrived first at the destination, the mansion of Count Guratol, and now they're ready to begin the second exercise, a cave exploration... but awaiting them there are thieves (the same ones that Rimuru encountered earlier) who hope to kidnap the students and make a fortune returning them for ransom money. Just when it seems like Rimuru's students have fought them off thanks to the skills he taught them, they realize a monster is lurking among the thieves: a Spectre! It is too strong for them, but they are saved by Kuro.

== See also ==
- List of That Time I Got Reincarnated as a Slime volumes
- List of That Time I Got Reincarnated as a Slime characters
