= List of That Time I Got Reincarnated as a Slime characters =

A promotional poster featuring Rimuru, Chloe, Milim and other demon lords.

The following is the list of characters, groups, and locations from That Time I Got Reincarnated as a Slime.

== Central World ==
The main setting, where the entire series takes place. It is a fantasy world made up of three continents: the Magic Continent, the Ice Continent, and El Dorado. The majority of the continents are controlled by the Octagram. The Magic Continent is the largest of the three continents and its regions are owned by Demon Lords Rimuru Tempest, Luminous Valentine, Dagruel, and Milim Nava. Most of the series takes place on this continent. The Ice Continent is the domain of Demon Lord Guy Crimson and El Dorado is the domain of Demon Lord Leon Cromwell. Surrounding the continents is an ocean filled with sea monsters, making it too dangerous to sail across.

== Main characters ==
Rimuru Tempest (リムル・テンペスト, Rimuru Tenpesuto)
Voiced by: Miho Okasaki (Rimuru), Takuma Terashima (Satoru) (Japanese); Brittney Karbowski (Rimuru), Jason Liebrecht (Satoru) (English)
Rimuru Tempest's background story begins in Japan, where he was originally a human man named Satoru Mikami. One day, while meeting a colleague from work, he is stabbed and killed by a criminal. However, he is reincarnated into a fantasy world called the Central World as a slime monster with unique abilities compared to the most Otherworlders, who were instead brought into the Central World. As a slime, Rimuru initially struggles to survive in this new world, but soon discovers that he has the power to absorb and mimic the abilities of any creature he consumes, eventually gaining an androgynous human form that resembles a younger version of Shizue Izawa. This allows him to gain new skills and become stronger. Rimuru eventually meets and befriends different monster races quickly gaining a reputation as a powerful and benevolent leader who strives to build a peaceful society for all races. He then establishes a nation called Jura Tempest Federation and becomes its ruler, promoting equality and justice among all its inhabitants. He also forms alliances with other powerful beings, including the Demon Lord Milim Nava, "The Destroyer", and the Storm Dragon, Veldora Tempest. Throughout his journey, Rimuru learns about the politics, conflicts of the fantasy world, and becomes a respected leader who is known for his wisdom, kindness, high intelligence, and strategic thinking. Though considered male, Rimuru is technically genderless. Despite facing many challenges and enemies, Rimuru remains determined to protect his friends and allies while achieving his goals. He eventually evolves into a Demon Lord and becomes a member of the Octagram after defeating rogue Demon Lord Clayman. He owns the center region of the Magic Continent.
Great Sage (大賢者, Dai-kenja) / Raphael (智慧之王(ラファエル), Rafaeru)
Voiced by: Megumi Toyoguchi (Japanese); Mallorie Rodak (English)
Great Sage is one of Rimuru Tempest's most powerful abilities in the series. It is a "Unique Skill", which means it is a unique ability that Rimuru gained when they were first reincarnated as a slime. Great Sage is a type of artificial intelligence that exists within Rimuru's mind, and it serves as their personal advisor and assistant. Whenever Rimuru faces a problem or needs information, Great Sage is able to analyze the situation and provide suggestions and solutions. It has vast knowledge and expertise in various fields, including science, magic, history, and more. It also has the ability to communicate with Rimuru through telepathy, making it a valuable tool for them. This feature was possible because of a partition of the voice from "Words of the World", also known as "Voice of the World", upon Rimuru's reincarnation to help them. Great Sage's intelligence and analytical abilities are almost unparalleled, and it is able to perform complex calculations and simulations in seconds. It also has a vast database of information, which it can access at any time to provide Rimuru with the answers they need. In addition, Great Sage has a wide range of other abilities, such as being able to manage Rimuru's skills and abilities, predict future events, and provide suggestions for strategic planning. After Rimuru became a Demon Lord, Great Sage evolves into Raphael.
Veldora Tempest (ヴェルドラ, Berudora)
Voiced by: Tomoaki Maeno (Japanese); Chris Rager (English)
One of the four original True Dragons, the "Storm Dragon", Veldora is a powerful dragon classified as a "Catastrophe-level" threat who was sealed away by a "Hero" in a cave for 300 years. When Veldora meets Rimuru, he was impressed by Rimuru's intelligence and confidence, especially being that they are a slime, one of the lowest, if not the lowest, of the monster races. The two then formed a strong bond by giving each other names. Veldora then teaches them about the world and helps them to improve their skills and abilities. In turn, Rimuru helped Veldora by providing him with companionship and freeing him from the "Infinite Prison" by devouring him. He is soon released and given a human body. He also agreed to serve as a front for the defeat of Falmuth's army. Throughout the series, Rimuru and Veldora work together to achieve their goals and protect their friends. Veldora also provides Rimuru with valuable advice and assistance, using his immense power to aid them in battles against powerful enemies. Their relationship is a testament to the power of friendship and loyalty, and their bond remains strong even when they are separated for prolonged periods of time. Overall, Rimuru and Veldora's relationship is one of the major highlights of the series. He is also revealed to be the uncle of the Demon Lord Milim Nava. He later moves into the Dungeon, where he serves as its master.

== Great Jura Forest ==
A large woodland found within the center of the Central World. The Jura Tempest Federation is located here, and within it lies Rimuru City. This domain is controlled by Rimuru Tempest. The Dungeon, which functions like an RPG game for adventurers, and the Dwelling of Elemental Spirits are also located here, both controlled by Ramiris.

=== Goblins/Hobgoblins/Goblinas ===
Gobta (ゴブタ, Gobuta)
Voiced by: Asuna Tomari (Japanese); Ryan Reynolds (English)
Gobta is a small hobgoblin who serves Rimuru as the leader of goblin riders. Despite how younger, smaller, and dumber he looks than other hobgoblins, he unexpectedly holds great proficiency in sword-skills enough to take down a big monster. Hakuro noted Gobta has talent worth nurturing. He ends up being a comedy relief, but nevertheless a competent fighter, not only as a swordsman, but as a magic user as well.
Rigurd (リグルド, Rigurudo)
Voiced by: Kanehira Yamamoto (Japanese); Kent Williams (English)
Rigurd is the sub-leader of the goblins in Tempest. Rigurd tends to be the comic relief due to his loyalty to Rimuru making him act silly at times. Along with Rimuru's evolution, he evolves to Goblin King status and becomes a sort of diplomat as well as leader of Rimuru's city while Rimuru themselves are away.
Gobzo (ゴブゾウ, Gobuzō)
Voiced by: Gakuto Kajiwara (Japanese); Clifford Chapin (English)
Gobzo is an aloof and reserved small goblin, slightly taller than Gobta. He is one of the goblin riders trained by Hakurou, who secretly has a crush on Shion. He becomes the target of Kirara's provocation when her group arrives in Tempest to instigate war and sacrifices himself to protect Shuna from Shōgo. Upon Rimuru's ascent to True Demon Lord, he is revived as a Death Onie and becomes a part of Shion's troops as those revived from the dead, the Yomigaeri.
Rigur (リグル, Riguru)
Voiced by: Haruki Ishiya (Japanese); Derick Snow (English)
Rigur is the son of Rigurd. Rimuru gave Rigur the name previously given to their elder brother to honor his memory. Rigur leads the hunting party for the village's meat supply.
Haruna (ハルナ, Haruna)
Voiced by: Juri Kimura (Japanese); Megan Shipman (English)
Haruna is a young and well-endowed goblina and one of Rimuru's handmaids.
Gobwa (ゴブア, Gobua)
Voiced by: Anna Nagase (Japanese); Katie Wetch (English)
Gobwa is a former goblin, who evolved into an ogre due to Benimaru's evolution, who serves as Benimaru's right-hand woman.

=== Ogres/Kijins/Oni/Wicked Oni ===
Benimaru (紅丸)
Voiced by: Makoto Furukawa (Japanese); Ricco Fajardo (English)
An ogre prince whose village was decimated by orcs. While leading the six ogre survivors for revenge, he comes across Rimuru and attacks them, mistaking them for the one who instigated the massacre. Upon realizing the truth, he makes a temporary alliance with Rimuru until the Orc Lord is defeated. After defeat of the Orc Lord, he and the other ogres permanently swear their allegiance to Rimuru and are named; resulting in their evolution into Kijin, a rare type of ogre with a more human-like appearance. Later, after pledging eternal allegiance to Rimiru, he was given the title of "Samurai General". He becomes immensely powerful after Rimuru becomes a Demon Lord, causing him to evolve into an Oni. He has a crush on Albis, but is also in an arranged engagement with Momiji.
Shion (紫苑)
Voiced by: M.A.O (Japanese); Michelle Rojas (English)
Shion is a well endowed female ogre who is also a terrible cook. One of the six survivors of the ogre village. She becomes Rimuru's (self-appointed) secretary and bodyguard after evolving into a Kijin. She loves hugging and carrying Rimuru whenever they're in their true form, and shares a rivalry with Shuna for Rimuru's attention. She is a great fighter, but often speaks out of turn, comically forcing Rimuru to take action to save face. She was given the simple title "Warrior" after the Orc Lord's defeat. Her strength grows severely from then on after evolving into a Wicked Oni, even after Rimuru revives her from death following their evolution to a Demon Lord, to the point that Demon Lord Clayman was no match for her.
Hakuro (白老, Hakurō)
Voiced by: Hōchū Ōtsuka (Japanese); Charlie Campbell (English)
Hakuro is an old ogre skilled at swordsmanship; like Rigurd, he regains some youth after being named and evolving into a Kijin. He is given the title of "Instructor" and teaches the art of swordsmanship to Rimuru, Gobuta and the other hobgoblin kids, and other monsters. He was also the teacher of the king of Dwargon; their meeting was 300 years before Rimuru's arrival. Following Rimuru's ascension to Demon Lord, he evolves into an Oni and becomes immensely powerful as well, with his speed becoming unmatched by most people. He is also Kaede's husband and Momiji's father.
Souei (蒼影, Sōei)
Voiced by: Takuya Eguchi (Japanese); Ian Sinclair (English)
Soei is a male ogre. He is a friend of Benimaru. One of the six survivors of the ogre village. Alongside the others, he evolves into a Kijin after being named. His abilities resemble that of ninjas, and he serves as scout, spy and messenger for Rimuru. After defeating the Orc lord, Rimuru gave him the title "Spy". After he evolves into an Oni, his skills grow even stronger after Rimuru becomes a Demon Lord.
Shuna (朱菜)
Voiced by: Sayaka Senbongi (Japanese); Tia Ballard (English)
Shuna is an ogre princess and Benimaru's sister. One of the six survivors of the ogre village. She is good at making clothes and teaches her skills to the goblins after evolving into a Kijin. Later, Rimuru gave her the title "Holy Princess". She usually competes with Shion for Rimuru's attention as she too likes to snuggle and carry Rimuru whenever they're in their blob form. Despite her traditional role as a healer and priestess, who stays behind in Tempest, she is a proficient magic user, even capable of using holy magic as a monster. She is also capable of fighting. After she evolves into an Oni, her magical abilities grew even stronger after Rimuru evolved into a Demon Lord.
Kurobe (黒兵衛, Kurobē)
Voiced by: Junichi Yanagita (Japanese); Eric Vale (English)
Kurobe is a large male ogre who was given the title of "Blacksmith" by Rimuru and works as such. He is the least featured of his companions, only appearing in the spin-off manga; he is even absent from the first anime opening. He and Kaijin make up most of Tempest's tools and weapon manufacturing. When he actually fights, he utilizes a giant mallet. After Rimuru evolves into Demon Lord, he becomes an excellent craftsman.

=== Lizardmen/Dragonewts ===
Gabil (ガビル, Gabiru)
Voiced by: Jun Fukushima (Japanese); Austin Tindle (English)
Gabil is the son of the lizardman chieftain. He is arrogant and always looks down upon others. Ignorant, he is spurred by Laplace to fight the Orc Lord himself, by overthrowing his father, but realizes his folly when he actually gets into the fight. He is saved by Rimuru's interference. For his actions, he is banished by his father and later he decides to serve Rimuru to atone for his sins, but not before being entrusted with his father's Vortex Spear. His name is overwritten by Rimuru, causing him evolving into a Dragonewt with wings. He becomes good friends with Vesta, whom works in a laboratory in the sealed cave Gabil and his men use to farm magical herbs.
Souka (ソーカ, Sōka)
Voiced by: Rumi Ōkubo (Japanese); Caitlin Glass (English)
Souka is the sister of Gabiru. She was the former leader of the guards of the lizardmen chieftain. After forming the Jura forest alliance with Rimuru, her father Abil sends her to serve Rimuru to gain some experience. She evolves into a Dragonewt with wings and a more human-like appearance after having been named by Rimuru; this was due to her infatuation with Souei and wish to be of use to him. Afterwards, she and her comrades join Souei as the spy-corps.
Abil (アビル, Abiru)
Voiced by: Tomoyuki Shimura (Japanese); Christopher Sabat (English)
Abil is the lizardmen chieftain. When he receives news of the pending Orc Disaster coming their way, though courageous, he is mostly lost on how to protect his tribe, until Rimuru offers help. He decides to take Rimuru's help and wanted to stand by, instead of fighting the Orc Lord, until the coup d'état by his own son. He is later released and saved. He banishes his son, so that he may go and serve Rimuru instead. He also sends his daughter to serve Rimuru for a term, so that she may receive experience.
Touka (東華, Tōka)
Voiced by: Yū Sasahara (Japanese); Dani Chambers (English)
A female lizardman who evolves into Dragonewt with wings and a human-like appearance after being given her name. She is a member of Souei's spy-corps.
Saika (西華)
Voiced by: Ayaka Shimizu (Japanese); Molly Searcy (English)
A female lizardman who evolves into Dragonewt with wings and a human-like appearance after being given her name. She is a member of Souei's spy-corps.

=== Demons ===
Diablo (ディアヴロ, Diaburo)
Voiced by: Takahiro Sakurai (Japanese); Daman Mills (English)
Diablo is one of the seven Primordial Demons, known as "Noir", and Rimuru's strongest subordinate. Having been summoned by Rimuru during the former's ascension to Demon Lord status, Diablo desired to serve them in order to see the "truth of the world", evolving into a Daemon Lord. Utterly devoted to his master, Diablo founded the Black Numbers, an organization of demons he has strictly disciplined, which has become Tempest's strongest fighting force. Several years prior, he was assigned to hunt demons down in a kingdom because of a contract where he has to kill demons as a woman's loved one died in return of her soul. In this time, he names himself Black and after this, he meets Shizu.
Ultima (ウルティマ, Urutima)
Voiced by: Miyu Tomita (Japanese); Cristina Valenzuela (English)
Also known as 'Violet' or "Primordial of Violet"; she is one of the Primordial Demons named after colors like Diablo and Guy Crimson. She loves to cause trouble for her own amusement, all while hoping to gain a vessel. Despite her antagonism, she handles her manipulative antics very strictly as she does not like her plans being tampered with and will either execute or end her allegiance with her subordinates if they violate her deal or do not accomplish their tasks the way she wanted them to. Through Diablo, she eventually is recruited to Rimuru's side and they name her Ultima, after another sports car. She debuts ahead of the manga in the first movie and also appears in the spin-off Visions of Coleus.
Carrera (カレラ, Karera)
Voiced by: Ikumi Hasegawa (Japanese); Emi Lo (English)
A carefree and energetic Primordial Daemon also known as 'Jaune' or "Primordial of Yellow". She is eventually recruited to join the Black Numbers and Rimuru names her Carrera, after a sports car.
Testarossa (テスタロッサ, Tesutarossa)
Voiced by: Yumi Uchiyama (Japanese); Stephanie Young (English)
An alluring, noble and mature Primordial Daemon also known as 'Blanc' or "Primordial of White". She is eventually recruited to join the Black Numbers and Rimuru names her Testarossa, after a sports car.
Veyron (ヴェイロン, Vueiron)
Voiced by: Mugihito (Japanese); John Gremillion (English)
He is Ultima's personal butler and a powerful Archdemon.
Zonda (ゾンダ, Zonda)
Voiced by: Yoshiki Nakajima (Japanese); Aaron Roberts (English)
He is Ultima's youthful Archdemon man-servant and her lieutenant.
Esprit (エスプリ, Esupuri)
Voiced by: Yurika Kubo (Japanese); Abigail Blythe (English)
She is Carrera's aloof attendant and an Archdemon.
Agera (アゲーラ, Agēra)
Voiced by: Kazuhiro Nakaya (Japanese); Ryan Negrón (English)
He is an Archdemon subordinate of Carrera and her voice of reason. He is also the reincarnation of Byakuya Araki (荒木 白夜, Araki Byakuya), founder of the Hazy Style and Hakurou's grandfather and master.
Cien (シエン)
Voiced by: Tatsumaru Tachibana (Japanese); Branden Loera (English)
He is Testarossa's obedient and diligent subordinate and an Archdemon.
Moss (モス, Mosu)
Voiced by: Misato Matsuoka (Japanese); Maganda Marie (English)
He is an Archdemon and one of Testarossa's subordinates. He has stood undefeated for tens of thousand of years, with his strength second only to the Primordials, though hides his strength in a childlike concealed form.
Venom (ヴェノム, Venomu)
Voiced by: Chiharu Sawashiro (Japanese); Tom Aglio (English)
He is a Greater Demon and Diablo's direct subordinate. It is said that he is very young but was born with a Unique skill, making him a Unique Daemon.

=== Dwarves ===
Kaijin (カイジン)
Voiced by: Atsushi Ono (Japanese); Bruce DuBose (English)
Kaijin is a dwarven blacksmith famous for his crafts. He is originally from the Dwarven capital city of Dwargon, and was serving under the king; until he was forced to take responsibly for a failed experiment by Vesta. After he assaulted the minister Vesta for insulting Rimuru, he and his friends are exiled from the dwarven kingdom and recruited by Rimuru to their village. He still holds the king of Dwargon in high esteem.
Garm (ガルム, Garumu)
Voiced by: Kōichi Sōma (Japanese); Phil Parsons (English)
The oldest of the dwarf brothers who specializes in armor-smithing.
Dold (ドルド, Dorudo)
Voiced by: Masashi Nogawa (Japanese); Bryan Massey (English)
The second oldest of the dwarf brothers who specializes in jewelry-crafting.
Myrd (ミルド, Mirudo)
Voiced by: Ryou Sugisaki (Japanese); Josh Martin (English)
The youngest of the dwarf brothers who specializes in architecture. He never speaks, only answering with "mm-hmm" to everything; this habit annoys Rimuru, who often briefly shouts for Myrd to speak.

=== Dryads/Dryas Doll Dryads ===
Treyni (トレイニー, Toreinī)
Voiced by: Rie Tanaka (Japanese); Jamie Marchi (English)
Treyni is a dryad. She and her kind are guardians of Great Forest of Jura. She was the one who warns Rimuru of the arrival of the Orc Disaster and requests them to defeat it. Later on, she forms an alliance with Rimuru to form the Jura-Tempest Federation; though she tricks them into taking the job. Beforehand, she served under the Fairy Queen turned Demon Lord, Ramiris. Later, she evolves into a Dryas Doll Dryad with Rimuru's help.
Trya (トライア, Toraia)
Voiced by: Kana Asumi (Japanese); Felecia Angelle (English)
Trya is a dryad as well as Treyni's younger sister. She notifies Rimuru of the arrival of the Orc army. She later serves Ramiris.
Doris (ドリス, Dorisu)
Voiced by: Kaori Maeda (Japanese); Kristi Rothrock (English)
A dryad and Treyni and Trya's little sister, who serves Ramiris alongside her sisters.

=== Other characters ===
Ranga (嵐牙)
Voiced by: Chikahiro Kobayashi (Japanese); Tyson Rinehart (English)
Ranga is a dire wolf who first encounters Rimuru when raiding the goblin village. Though in the ensuing battle, his father, who is the pack's leader, is killed, he, being next in line, chooses to serve Rimuru instead of avenging his father as he was aware that his father's death was his own fault; it is implied that he was against the idea of attacking the goblins. After being named by Rimuru, he and his pack evolved into Tempest Wolves, while Ranga himself evolved further as Tempest Star Wolf after using his skill 'Death Storm'.
Vesta (ベスター, Besutā)
Voiced by: Kenjiro Tsuda (Japanese); Brandon Potter (English)
Vesta was the former minister of the Dwarven Kingdom. Following his conflict with Rimuru, he was fired for his unwise actions. After establishing an alliance with Jura-Tempest Federation, dwarven king gave Vesta to Rimuru as a gift hoping he could help Tempest with his knowledge.
Geld (ゲルド, Gerudo)
Voiced by: Kenji Nomura (Japanese); Jim Foronda (English)
An orc who served as one of the Orc Lord's bodyguard; as well as his son. Though he was fond of his former lord, he also understood how much suffering his lord was going through, and hence doesn't bear a grudge towards Rimuru for defeating him, instead wants to take responsibility for their joint actions as he knew that Rimuru is not to blame for his father's death. After the defeat of the Orc Lord, he is named by Rimuru and evolved into a High Orc. He is appointed as the lord of the other High Orcs in Tempest and a commander of its army. Despite his gruff appearance, he is good with children just like his father was.
Gard Mjöllmile (ミョルマイル, Garudo Myorumairu)
Voiced by: Yutaka Aoyama (Japanese); Kenny Green (English)
A merchant formerly from Ingressia. He moved to Tempest shortly after Rimuru's ascension to Demon Lord. Mjöllmile is in charge of finance and advertising for Tempest.
Adalman (アダルマン, Adaruman)
Voiced by: Tomokazu Sugita (Japanese); J. Michael Tatum (English)
Adalman is a former holy man from the Holy Western Church, who became an undead wight mage capable of controlling armies of undead and even undead dragons. He was enslaved by Clayman, becoming his Index Finger before Shuna sets him free and inspired him with her holy magic capabilities. As such, he joined Rimuru's side and resides in the Jura Tempest Federation.
Kumara (九魔羅)
Voiced by: Sayumi Suzushiro (Japanese); Lindsay Seidel (English)
Kumara is a Cryptid originally enslaved by Clayman who served as a member of his Five Fingers, and was freed from his curse by Rimuru Tempest and joined Tempest as a result. She is the only subordinate of Rimuru to have received a total of nine names, in contrast to Ranga, whose single name became the name of his entire species. She serves as the Guardian of the 90th floor of the Dungeon and a member of the Twelve Guardian Lords respectively.
Beretta (ベレッタ)
Voiced by: Ayako Kawasumi (Japanese); Morgan Lauré (English)
Beretta originally was a Greater Daemon who was summoned to fulfill a contract of inhabiting a Golem created by Rimuru to be the guardian of Ramiris for 100 years. As soon as they possessed the Golem and were named, they evolved into an Arch Doll. Though they swore to Guy Crimson to only serve Ramiris after settling the debt to Rimuru, they can still serve Rimuru and evolve together with them as Rimuru is their creator.
Kaoru Yoshida (田薫 吉, Yoshida Kaoru)
Voiced by: Tsuyoshi Koyama (Japanese); Josh Tomar (English)
Yoshida is an Otherworlder who had a renowned cafe that sells various otherworld pastries in the Kingdom of Inglassia, but is convinced by Rimuru to move to the Jura Tempest Federation.
Mezul (メズール, Mezūru)
Voiced by: Kyouhei Natsume (Japanese); Markus Lloyd (English)
The leader of the Equinoids and Gozul's rival. They both wanted to serve Rimuru just so they can defeat each other, but Rimuru is able to convince them to work together. In turn, they swear loyalty to Rimuru and become the joint guardians of the 50th floor of the Dungeon.
Gozul (ゴズール, Gozūru)
Voiced by: Naoya Nosaka (Japanese); Ray Hurd (English)
The leader of the Bovoids and Mezul's rival. They both wanted to serve Rimuru just so they can defeat each other, but Rimuru is able to convince them to work together. In turn, they swear loyalty to Rimuru and become the joint guardians of the 50th floor of the Dungeon.
Daggra (ダグラ, Dagura)
Voiced by: Ryuuho Nagaoka (Japanese); Ben Balmaceda (English)
The oldest of Dagruel's sons. He and his brothers are sent to Tempest by their father to train with Rimuru due to the ruckus that they made in their homeland. After Shion defeats him and his brothers, they become infatuated with her.
Liura (リューラ, Ryūra)
Voiced by: Yuuga Satou (Japanese); Kevin D. Thelwell (English)
The second oldest of Dagruel's sons. He and his brothers are sent to Tempest by their father to train with Rimuru due to the ruckus that they made in their homeland. After Shion defeats him and his brothers, they become infatuated with her.
Chonkra (デブラ, Debura)
Voiced by: Youhei Hamada (Japanese); Alex Mai (English)
The youngest of Dagruel's sons. He and his brothers are sent to Tempest by their father to train with Rimuru due to the ruckus that they made in their homeland. After Shion defeats him and his brothers, they become infatuated with her.
Momiji (紅葉)
Voiced by: Moe Kahara (Japanese); Suzie Yeung (English)
Momiji is the representative of the Tengu Tribe of the Mountains and the child of Hakuro and Kaede. She's been entrusted to Hakuro's care by her mother with the hope that she progresses in her training and improves her skills, but above all, to form a bond with her father. She is also engaged to Benimaru and later moves to Tempest. She holds great resentment towards Frey for trying to conquer her village in the past.
Glenda Attley (グレンダ・アトリー, Gurenda Atorī)
Voiced by: Mari Hino (Japanese); Laura Stahl (English)
Glenda Attley of Raging Sea is an Otherworlder mercenary, who was recruited to be a member of the Ten Great Saints. She also works for the Rozzo family, though it is because she is under a curse that forces her to serve them. She does not accompany Hinata to Tempest after she receives a false message from Rimuru challenging her, instead taking part in Falmuth's civil war; it was she who forged the message. After she and Saare fight Diablo, she flees in the middle of the fight, knowing that she can't win. After murdering Muese to cover the Rozzo family's tracks, she next tries to kill Elric for his failures and frame Rimuru for his death, but Rimuru thwarts this at the last second. Following her capture, Rimuru undoes her curse, and she allies with Rimuru in return.
Ifrit (イフリート, Ifurīto) / Charys (カリス, Karisu)
Voiced by: Mariko Higashiuchi (Japanese); Madeleine Norton (English) (Female)
Voiced by: Taku Yashiro (Japanese); Chris Guerrero (English) (Male)
A fire spirit who previously possessed Shizu. Like Rimuru, they are genderless. After taking full control of Shizu's body, they were defeated and imprisoned by Rimuru, but were later freed and given a body so they can work as Veldora's assistant in the Dungeon. Veldora gives Ifrit the name Charys, causing them to evolve into a Flame Lord. They can switch between genders.
Takt (タクト, Takuto)
Voiced by: Riho Sugiyama (Japanese); Ali Macaulay (English)
A young halfling who serves as a symphony conductor for Tempest's orchestra.

== Dwargon Kingdom ==
The home of the Dwarves. It is located north of the Jura Forest inside a cavern in the Canaat Mountains. This area is controlled by Gazel Dwargo. It soon became part of Rimuru's territory.

Gazel Dwargo (ガゼル・ドワルゴ, Gazeru Dowarugo)
Voiced by: Takaya Hashi (Japanese); Randy E. Aguebor (Season 1), Bill Butts (Season 2–present) (English)
The king of dwarven kingdom Dwargon and an old friend of Kaijin's. Known as the Heroic King, he is powerful, wise, and fair. He is a powerful warrior specialized in swordsmanship and was once trained by Hakuro. He forms a friendship and political alliance with Rimuru and their nation of Tempest after realizing their worth.
Dolf (ドルフ, Dorufu)
Voiced by: Hisao Egawa (Japanese); Shawn Gann (English)
Dolf is the prudent Captain of the Pegasus Knights and a close associate of Gazel Dwargo. He spends most of his time in the public eye acting the role of a civil servant.
Kaidou (カイドウ, Kaidō)
Voiced by: Shouto Kashii (Japanese); Jeff Johnson (English)
Kaido is the captain of the dwarven guards in Dwargon and Kaijin's younger brother. He quickly befriended Rimuru after the latter provided their highly potent healing potions to save Garm's group. Whenever Rimuru and their friends are in Dwargon, they tend to hang out in the elven brothel.
Henrietta (アンリエッタ, Anrietta)
Voiced by: Madoka Asahina (Japanese); Leah Clark (English)
The leader of Dwargon's Dark Ministry, known by her title "Head of the Night Assassins". She serves as Dwargo's undercover shadow, and is a member of his inner circle of officials. Dwargo once sent her to keep an eye on Rimuru.
Jane (ジェーン, Jēn)
Voiced by: Kyo Yaoya (Japanese); Monica Rial (English)
The arch-wizard of Dwargon's Royal Court and close advisor. She had supported Dwargon since its founding with her magical expertise and knowledge.

== Blumund Kingdom ==
A human nation that neighbors the Kingdom of Falmuth and the Jura Tempest Federation. It is controlled by Drum Blumund. The kingdom soon became part of Rimuru's territory.

Fuze (フューズ, Fyūzu)
Voiced by: Ken Narita (Japanese); Mike McFarland (English)
Guild Master of the Free Guild in the smaller Eastern nation of Blumund Kingdom. He is often shocked to the point he literally loses his color whenever something happens in Tempest.
Velyard (ベルヤード, Beruyādo)
Voiced by: Itaru Yamamoto (Japanese); David Wald (English)
Velyard is one of Blumund's ministers and the one who usually assigns the missions to Fuze.
Kazak (カザック, Kazakku)
Voiced by: Yōji Ueda (Japanese); Nic Olsen (English)
A corrupt viscount formerly from the Blumund Kingdom, who runs a criminal organization called Orthrus. He once came to Gard's place to get more slaves for his demi-human trafficking operation and when he considers taking Rimuru, Gard cuts ties with him, causing him to vow revenge. It is later revealed that he was arrested after his operation was stopped by Masayuki.
Drum Blumund (ドラム・ブルムンド, Doramu Burumundo)
Voiced by: Takehiro Hasu (Japanese); Kyle Hebert (English)
Blumund's king, who forms a good relationship with Rimuru.

== Kabal's Party ==
A trio of B rank adventures that usually come in conflict with Rimuru during his adventures. They are good friends to Shizu and Rimuru.

Kabal (カバル, Kabaru)
Voiced by: Kengo Takanashi (Japanese); Justin Cook (English)
A male human adventurer in the Fighter class. He is the leader of the adventurer party simply known as Kabal's Party, consisting of himself, Elen, and Gido. He is one of Shizue's companions and one of Rimuru's first human friends as a slime. Though his party is known to Rimuru as somewhat clumsy (and considered comic relief), they are considered very reliable in their local adventurer community. He is one of the mages protecting Elen, an elf princess.
Elen (エレン, Eren) / Elyun Grimwald (エリューン・グリムワルト, Eryūn Gurimuwaruto)
Voiced by: Akane Kumada (Japanese); Natalie Hoover (English)
A female human adventurer in the Mage class. She is one of Shizue's companions and one of Rimuru's first human friends as a slime. She later reveals to Rimuru that she is truly an elf princess from the Sorcerous Dynasty of Thalion, having gone adventuring with her guards/friends.
Gido (ギド)
Voiced by: Ryuichi Kijima (Japanese); Brad Hawkins (English)
A male human adventurer in the Thief class. He is one of Shizue's companions and one of Rimuru's first human friends as a slime. Although he specializes in covert operations and information-gathering, he tends to lead his party straight into monster dens instead of away from them; in short, he's someone who pokes a hornet's nest to see what happens. He is one of the mages protecting Elen, an elf princess.

== Kingdom of Falmuth/Farmenas ==
A country west of the Dwargon Kingdom, that was for a time known as the gateway to the western nations. It was brought to ruin and passed down to future generations as a foolish country that incurred the wrath of Rimuru after the inhabitants attacked their city. The Kingdom of Farmenas was built in its place. It is currently controlled by Youm Farmenas and also became a part of Rimuru's territory.

Youm Farmenas (ヨウム・ファルメナス, Yōmu Farumenasu)
Voiced by: Yoshimasa Hosoya (Japanese); David Matranga (English)
Youm is the captain of the Falmuth Kingdom's scouting mission of the Jura Forest. He later swears loyalty to Rimuru and takes credit for slaying the Orc Disaster as part of improving Tempest's image. He later weds Myulan, a witch previously controlled by Clayman, and overthrows the Falmuth monarchy with Rimuru's help, establishing the Kingdom of Farmenas in its place and becoming its first king.
Myulan (ミュウラン, Myūran)
Voiced by: Atsumi Tanezaki (Japanese); Colleen Clinkenbeard (English)
Myulan is a very powerful wizard majin enslaved by Clayman, turning her into one of his five strongest combatants, the Five Fingures, having the title of Ring Finger. She seals away magic in Tempest, which inadvertently causes the temporary deaths of Shion and many goblin citizens, but she soon helps Rimuru destroy the army of Falmuth after Rimuru frees her from Clayman's control by removing her artificial heart that binds her will to Clayman's and replacing it with a normal artificial heart (all while tricking Clayman into believing that she was murdered). She falls for Youm during their short time together in Tempest, and joins him in rebuilding Falmuth after the two marry.
Grucius (グルーシス, Gurūshisu)
Voiced by: Satoshi Hino (Japanese); Nazeeh H. Tarsha (English)
Originally an envoy to the Tempest-Jura Federation from Eurazania, he is a lycanthrope, who becomes friends with Youm during their training with Hakuro. He also cares deeply for Myulan, and is the key to her and Youm admitting their feelings for each other.
Razen (ラーゼン, Rāzen)
Voiced by: Eiji Hanawa (Japanese); R. Bruce Elliot (English)
A powerful human-turned majin, who has served the kingdom of Falmuth as its most powerful magic user for centuries. He employs the Otherworlder group led by Shōgo regularly to do his dirty work. After assigning them the mission to instigate a conflict in the Jura Tempest Federation, which would make it look like the monsters are violent, the army of Falmuth sets out to invade, but they underestimated how powerful Tempest's forces are. During the battle, Rimuru slaughters the army, which begins their evolution to Demon Lord status. After Rimuru uses the bodies of the slain to summon the Primordial Demon Noir into their servitude, Razen is quickly captured by the latter. Following brutal torture at Shion's hands, Razen swears fealty to Diablo after he restores his body and helps his cause with installing Youm as the new ruler.
Shōgo Taguchi (ショウゴ・タグチ, Taguchi Shōgo)
Voiced by: Chiaki Kobayashi (Japanese); Matt Shipman (English)
A sadistic Otherworlder, who possesses the Unique Skill Berserker. He and his comrades are enslaved by Falmuth's forces. He is bored and uninterested by the world of monsters and relishes in killing, successfully killing Shion for a brief period, while Tempest is stripped of magic. During Rimuru's retribution, Geld brutalizes him to the point, that he kills Kirara to gain her Unique skills. When he still proves too weak, Falmuth's great sorcerer of many centuries, Razen, takes his body over, who then proceeds to get decimated by Diablo.
Kyōya Tachibana (キョウヤ・タチバナ, Tachibana Kyōya)
Voiced by: Sho Nogami (Japanese); Kyle Phillips (English)
An Otherworlder swordsman, who possesses the Unique Skill All-Seeing Eye, which grants him the ability to greatly increase the speed of his thoughts and perception of the world around him. He and his comrades are enslaved by Falmuth's forces. When Tempest is stripped of magic, he gravely injures Hakuro and Gobta. During the counterattack of Rimuru, Hakuro effortlessly decapitates him, while his skill is active, making him feel his death for a greatly extended period.
Kirara Mizutani (キララ・ミズタニ, Mizutani Kirara)
Voiced by: Hiyori Kono (Japanese); Meg McClain (English)
A manipulative Otherworlder who possesses the Unique skill to brainwash people with her words. She and her comrades are enslaved by Falmuth's forces. She attempts to trick the humans in Tempest that the monsters are dangerous, but Gobta defuses her powers. She is later murdered by Shogo during Rimuru's annihilation of the Falmuth army.
Edmaris Falmuth (エドマリス ファルムス, Edomarisu Farumusu)
Voiced by: Hiroshi Yanaka (Japanese); Bill Flynn (English)
The former king of Falmuth who tried to destroy the Jura Tempest Federation under the direction of the Western Holy Empire, but his army is instead wiped out as he highly underestimated how powerful the monster nation is, and he is then captured by Rimuru. Following brutal torture at Shion's hands, Edmaris realizes his folly and swears to help Diablo's mission to install Youm as the new ruler of the kingdom, so as not to anger Rimuru again. He eventually steps down and his brother takes over for him.
Reyhiem (レイヒム, Reihimu)
Voiced by: Hayato Fuji (Japanese); Ben Phillips (English)
Reyhiem is an archbishop of the Western Holy Church, and the most powerful religious figure in the Kingdom of Falmuth. He was king's right hand who lead the latter into Falmuth's adoption of Luminism as its state religion. Due to the hostility for monsters in the Luminism religion, Reyhiem leads Edmaris into attacking Tempest, which leads to their fall from grace as Tempest's army was stronger than theirs. After enduring torture at Shion's hands, he also swears loyalty to Diablo and Youm as the new leaders of the kingdom. He is killed by the Seven Luminaries after delivering a message from Rimuru to the Western Holy Church after realizing that they tampered with the message to make it seem like a declaration of war.
Carlos (カルロス, Karurosu)
Voiced by: Yū Wakabayashi (Japanese); Frank Todaro (English)
A hot-tempered noble from the Kingdom of Falmuth. He is the only noble who completely opposes the idea of allying with Tempest and is imprisoned in a block of ice by Razen as punishment.
Edward Falmuth (エドワルド ファルムス, Edowarudo Farumusu)
Voiced by: Shouto Kashii (Japanese); Brook Chalmers (English)
Edmaris's ambitious younger brother, who takes over for Edmaris after he steps down. He soon resigns and passes the throne to Youm.
Edgar Falmuth (エドガー ファルムス, Edogā Farumusu)
Voiced by: Mayu Minami (Japanese); Greg Ayres (English)
Former king Edmaris' young son, who became Youm's assistant following his father and uncle's abdication of the throne.

== Kingdom of Ingrassia ==
The most advanced human nation west of the Jura Forest prior to Tempest's emergence. It is controlled by King Aegil and soon becomes a part of Rimuru's territory.

Yuuki Kagurazaka (ユウキ カグラザカ, Yūki Kagurazaka)
Voiced by: Natsuki Hanae (Japanese); Clifford Chapin (English)
The grandmaster of the Freedom Academy. An "otherworlder" formerly tutored by Shizu, Yuuki was secretly a nihilist who wants to watch the world burn in chaos in order to create a peaceful world. Devious and highly intelligent, Yuuki plays the long game to build up enough forces in order to achieve this goal. He succeeded in resurrecting the Demon Lord Kazalim in a new body, and manipulates his subordinate Clayman as well as the Western Holy Church in an attempt to gain attention and love from Rimuru. Although not completely a villain, he also fears that Rimuru might become a dangerous threat and makes attempts to stop them using his pawns, but every ploy ends in failure. Eventually, he had to flee to the East when his schemes and true colors are exposed by Rimuru.
Chloe Aubert (クロエ オベール, Kuroe Obēru) / Chronoa (クロノア, Kuronoa)
Voiced by: Azusa Tadokoro (Japanese); Emily Neves (English)
Chloe is truly an enigma. Having been trapped in an endless cycle of time-jumping reincarnation, Chloe has been both the student and teacher to Shizu, as well as being the hero who sealed Veldora. In the present, this cycle was broken. Her current body is kept in a Holy Ark by Luminous while a younger version of her attended Freedom Academy. The adult Chloe is later awakened and used by Granville to eliminate the Demon Lords, leading to Chronoa, a manas that exists inside of Chloe as a second personality to also awaken, while the young Chloe vanishes 2,000 years into the past with Hinata's soul inside her body to befriend Luminous and become the Hero Chronoa, who seals Veldora before being sealed by Luminous herself, upon her new birth into the world. It is then revealed that the time cycle was triggered whenever Hinata was killed. In the original timeline, Rimuru and Hinata were killed by the Eastern Empire and a rampaging Veldora, but because Hinata was killed by Granville, the time jump was triggered too early. Chloe worked with Hinata to change the future so Rimuru and Hinata will not die in the new timeline, eventually putting themselves in stasis inside the Holy Ark when their past selves arrived in the Central World. She is eventually awakened from within Chronoa and restored to her young age by Rimuru.
Kenya Misaki (ケンヤ ミサキ, Misaki Kenya)
Voiced by: Ayaka Asai (Japanese); Brittany Lauda (English)
An energetic and brash boy who favors fire magic. He is currently a host to a light spirit.
Ryōta Sekiguchi (リョウタ セキグチ)
Voiced by: Shizuka Ishigami (Japanese); Apphia Yu (English)
A quiet child, who possesses berserker magic.
Gale Gibson (ゲイル ギブソン)
Voiced by: Gen Satō (Japanese); Justin Briner (English)
The oldest of the summoned children, he is proficient at using magic bullets.
Alice Rondo (アリス ロンド, Arisu Rondo)
Voiced by: Haruka Shiraishi (Japanese); Sarah Wiedenheft (English)
A smug girl who loves stuffed toys. Alice can control them with telepathy.
Jeff Segal (ジェフ シーガル, Jefu Shīgaru)
Voiced by: Hiroyuki Kinoshita (Japanese); David Vincent (English)
A nobleman and homeroom teacher of the Freedom Academy's Class A students. He is Ulamuth and Chiffon's brother.
Tiss (ティス, Tisu)
Voiced by: Mikako Komatsu (Japanese); Erica Mendez (English)
A homeroom teacher of the Freedom Academy who is assigned to watch over Class S students during a test. She later takes over for Rimuru after their time at the school is over.
Guratol (グラトル, Guratoru)
Voiced by: Masaki Terasoma (Japanese); Brad Venable (English)
The count of the Town of Guratol and a supporter of the Freedom Academy. After his wife got ill, he ordered medicine for her illness, but thieves had stolen it. When Class S arrives during a test, they were a day earlier than expected and as their rooms are not ready. He suggests they to check the caves, but soon learns of the events with the thieves and Phantom in the caves and that the medicine was used by them. Learning that Rimuru has such a medicine, which is one of their potions, he begs Rimuru to give him one and Rimuru agrees on the condition he treats his wife. Rimuru operates on Ulamuth, removing the affected organ and then uses their potion to heal her. As Ulamuth makes full recovery, the Count is happy that his wife is alive and can walk again.
Ulamuth Guratol (ウラムス グラトル, Uramusu Guratoru)
Voiced by: Arisa Sakuraba (Japanese); Cristina Valenzuela (English)
Count Guratol's wife, Jeff's sister, and Chiffon's elder sister. When she suffered from a terrible illness, her husband had arranged to get a medicine for her illness, but thieves had stolen the caravan carrying the medicine, which ends up being used by them. Learning that the medicine is a Full Potion like the ones Rimuru creates, Count Guratol and Jeff asks Rimuru if they have any and he confirms that they do. After analyzing her condition, Rimuru agrees to give them the potions, but they want to treat Ulamuth himself. As applying a potion on her may do harm rather than good, they removed the affected organ and used the potion to regenerate the organ. Ulamuth then recovers and is now able to walk again.
Gesdar (ゲスダー, Gesudā)
Voiced by: Yōji Ueda (Japanese); Neil Kaplan (English)
A butler serving Count Guratol. Gesdar brings Count Guratol a letter from Freedom Academy reminding him that the students training is coming up. He asks Gesdar if there are any news on the thieves who stole the caravan containing the medicine for his wife, but Gesdar declines. Guratol then orders him to inspect the caves and arrange the students lodging. Reaching the caves, Gesdar is surprised at the sight of the door open and enters to inspect it. Inside, he gets possessed by a Phantom, but is eventually freed by Noir.
Anne (アン, An)
Voiced by: Hina Kino (Japanese); Cherami Leigh (English)
A student at Freedom Academy. She is in Jeff's Class A and is assigned to be observed by Rimuru during a test.
Ukya (ウキャ, Ukya)
Voiced by: Kayuki Matsumoto (Japanese); Kellen Goff (English)
A student at Freedom Academy. He is in Jeff's Class A and is assigned to be observed by Rimuru during a test.
Elizabeth (エリサベ, Erisabe)
Voiced by: Yuka Iwahashi (Japanese); Jeannie Tirado (English)
A student at Freedom Academy. She is in Jeff's Class A and is assigned to be observed by Rimuru during a test.
Illory (イロリ, Irori)
Voiced by: Ayaka Nanase (Japanese); Suzie Yeung (English)
A student at Freedom Academy. She is in Jeff's Class A and is assigned to be observed by Rimuru during a test.
Oloy (オロイ, Oroi)
Voiced by: Ikumi Hasegawa (Japanese); Amber Lee Connors (English)
A student at Freedom Academy. He is in Jeff's Class A and is assigned to be observed by Rimuru during a test.
Elric von Ingrassia (エルリック フォン イングラシア, Erurikku fon Ingurashia)
Voiced by: Ryōhei Arai (Japanese); Cody Savoie (English)
The first prince of Ingrassia. Due to his wariness of Rimuru, he once asked Hinata to serve as his bodyguard so he can confront Rimuru without worry in an upcoming meeting, but she refuses. He later attends the meeting to take down Rimuru himself, but his plan failed. He is almost killed by Glenda for his failure, but Rimuru saves him at the last second. Afterwards, he ends his war with Rimuru after realizing that he was tricked.
Lester (レスター, Resutā)
Voiced by: Soshiro Hori (Japanese); Lucas Schuneman (English)
The chairman of the Council of the West.
Reiner (ライナー, Rainā)
Voiced by: Takaaki Uchino (Japanese); Adam Michael Gold (English)
A prideful knight who serves Elric. After being defeated by Hinata, he was arrested for his crimes and sent to be an experiment.
Aegil von Ingrassia (エーギル フォン イングラシア, Ēgiru fon Ingurashia)
Voiced by: Takaaki Torashima (Japanese); Mike Bodie (English)
The king of Ingrassia and Elric's father.

== Moderate Harlequin Alliance ==
A group of powerful Majin created by Kagali, who currently work with Yuuki Kagurazaka. Clayman is their leader. They are a jack-of-all-trades that can be hired to do various kinds of jobs and their number one and absolute rule is to never betray their friends and clients. Their defining characteristic is their clown-like appearance with use of various masks. The Puppet Nation of Jistav serves as Clayman's domain, but after the latter's demise, it becomes a part of both Rimuru and Milim's territory.

Kagali (カガリ, Kagari)
Voiced by: Yui Ishikawa (Japanese); Margaret MacDonald (English)
Voiced by: Volcano Ōta (Japanese); Jason Marnocha (English) (Kazalim)
A former Demon Lord known as the "Curse Lord" Kazalim and the president of the Moderate Harlequin Alliance. Believed to have been killed by Leon Cromwell 200 years ago, Kagali survived as an Astral Body and now resides in a Homunculus. She serves as Yuuki Kagurazaka's secretary.
Laplace (ラプラス, Rapurasu)
Voiced by: Kazuya Nakai (Japanese); Christopher Bevins (English)
The vice-president of the Moderate Harlequin Alliance, a mysterious group whose members all wear clown masks representing different emotions. He is one of Clayman's allies and considers him a good friend, though he always warns Clayman about his recklessness. He is the one who provoked Gabil to imprison his father. Despite relying mostly on his skills of manipulation, he is actually immensely strong, as he quickly dispatches the proxy of Demon Lord Luminous Valentine, Roy Valentine, in a fit of rage after the latter taunts him about Clayman's demise. He later delivers the bad news to the others, who all decide to lay low for a bit. He and his allies eventually resurface and continue aiding Yuuki with his plans.
Clayman (クレイマン, Kureiman)
Voiced by: Takehito Koyasu (Japanese); John Burgmeier (English)
A deathman Demon Lord, known as the "Marionette Master" due to his manipulative, behind-the-scene tendencies; he is also known for removing the hearts of three of his five subordinates, the Five Fingers, and using them as wire taps. He is the leader of the Moderate Harlequin Alliance and a good friend to Laplace, but the latter is wary of how overconfident Clayman is and constantly warns him to correct it. He is directly responsible for the plan to awaken a true Demon Lord. As such, he was indirectly responsible for destroying the Kijin's village, the war with the Lizardmen through Gelmud, setting Hinata Sakaguchi up against Rimuru while manipulating Falmuth into attacking their nation, and the destruction of Carrion's kingdom through Milim; however, he is actually doing these acts under orders from his benefactor: Yuuki Kagurazaka. He seems to despise Rimuru, disliking the idea of a slime monster becoming a Demon Lord. He believes himself to be the orchestrator of the fall of Eurazania and attempts to set Rimuru up in front of the other Demon Lords, but Rimuru exposes his plots and effortlessly kills him.
Footman (フットマン, Futtoman)
Voiced by: Shinji Kawada (Japanese); Sonny Strait (English)
A member of the Moderate Harlequin Alliance, wearing a mask of anger. He is one of Clayman's allies, often working together with Tear, a fellow Jester. He was the one manipulating the original Orc Lord Geld into slaughtering the Ogre village, later also manipulating Phobio with Tear to resurrect the Calamity Charybdis. After Charybdis's defeat, Phobio later tried to get revenge on them during the battle between Rimuru and Clayman's forces, but he and Tear were too strong for him; however, they did not kill him as they weren't ordered to do so. Once he found out about Clayman's death, the team decide to go into hiding for a while. He and his allies eventually resurface and continue aiding Yuuki with his plans.
Tear (ティア, Tia)
Voiced by: Kaede Hondo (Japanese); Monica Rial (English)
A member of the Moderate Harlequin Alliance, wearing a mask of tears. She is one of Clayman's allies and one of the few people he cares for dearly. She manipulates Phobio together with Footman into resurrecting Charybdis. After Charybdis's defeat, Phobio later tried to get revenge on them during the battle between Rimuru and Clayman's forces, but she and Footman were too strong for him; however, they did not kill him as they weren't ordered to do so. Once she found out about Clayman's death, the team decide to go into hiding for a while. She and her allies eventually resurface and continue aiding Yuuki with his plans.
Gelmud (ゲルミュッド, Gerumyuddo)
Voiced by: Kengo Kawanishi (Japanese); Vic Mignogna (English)
One of Clayman's minions, he gave names to the Orc Lord Geld, Gabil, and others to awaken a true demon lord. He was later eaten by the Orc Lord, becoming the catalyst for his awakening.
Yamza (ヤムザ, Yamuza)
Voiced by: Yūya Hirose (Japanese); Bryson Baugus (English)
Yamza is the Frozen Swordmage and the Commander-in-Chief of Clayman's army, as well as the Middle Finger of his Five Fingers. He is one of the members of the Five Fingers not to be enslaved by Clayman, having joined of his own volition. During the assault of Rimuru's forces he faces off against Albis and Gobta and they both humiliate him in battle, to the point that he attempts to flee. Clayman forces him to turn into an imitation of Charybdis however, after which Benimaru easily annihilates him.
Eva (エヴァ)
Voiced by: Aki Toyosaki (Japanese); Tiana Camacho (English)
Eva is the elder of the Dark Elves and a member of the Moderate Harlequin Alliance, known as the "No Face". She swore loyalty to Kazalim and they lived together through history, serving under him, then Clayman, and later the resurrected Kazalim as Kagali.

== Kingdom of Eurazania ==
A country located south of the Great Jura Forest, and is inhabited by various bestial beastmen. It is currently controlled by Carrion and is a part of Milim's territory.

Carrion (カリオン, Karion)
Voiced by: Yasuaki Takumi (Japanese); Marcus D. Stimac (English)
Carrion is a beastman Demon Lord, a race of demi-humans that possess animalistic features. Unlike most of his kin, he is quite level headed, but he is quick to punish his subordinates. He is a powerful warrior and the king of the "Beast Country" Eurazania. Following Phobio's actions against Tempest, he is deemed a traitor and Clayman had Demon Lords Milim and Frey eliminate him, but his death was faked to fool Clayman. After Clayman is slain, he relinquishes his status as Demon Lord and becomes Milim's subordinate.
Albis (アルビス, Arubisu)
Voiced by: Ai Kakuma (Japanese); Elizabeth Maxwell (English)
A lamia and the leader of the Three Beastketeers, Carrion's elite guard. She is a formidable fighter, capable of turning anything she sees into stone as well as being adept with poisons. During the battle between Rimuru and Clayman's army, she emerges victorious in the fight against Clayman's most formidable subordinate, the Middle Finger Yamza, wielder of the Ice-Sword. She and Suphia later help move all of Eurazania's citizens into Tempest for the time being and also aid Rimuru in their battle against Hinata and her forces. She has feelings for Benimaru.
Phobio (フォビオ, Fobio)
Voiced by: Seiichirō Yamashita (Japanese); Stephen Fu (English)
A reckless panther lycanthrope who is a member of the Three Beastketeers. He went off on his own to attack Tempest, first beating Rigurd, only to be beaten by Milim. He was later saved by Rimuru after being tricked by Tear and Footman into being possessed by Charybdis so he can get revenge on Milim. During the battle against Clayman's army, he sought to get revenge on Tear and Footman for tricking him with Geld's help, but the clowns were stronger than them. He and Geld were nevertheless spared as they aren't Tear and Footman's intentional targets; however, their actions still ensured Rimuru's victory.
Suphia (スフィア, Sufia)
Voiced by: Yō Taichi (Japanese); Terri Doty (English)
A tiger lycanthrope, whose physical power is equal to Shion; as well as having similar personalities. During the conquest to eliminate Clayman, she teams up with Gabil in an attempt to defeat Father Middray, a Dragonewt follower of Milim. She and Albis later help move all of Eurazania's citizens into Tempest for the time being and also aid Rimuru in their battle against Hinata and her forces. Near the end of the series, she marries Gabil and has a child with him.

== Western Holy Empire ==
An empire that houses the Western Holy Church, which is hostile to non-human creatures (especially Rimuru and their people); however, their perspective towards Tempest changed upon learning that the monster nation is no threat. This is Luminous Valentine's territory; the Night Rose was Luminous's original territory until Veldora destroyed it.

Luminous Twilight Valentine (ルミナス・バレンタイン, Ruminasu Barentain)
Voiced by: Lynn (Japanese); Jill Harris (English)
A powerful vampire and one of the oldest True Demon Lords who is known by the epithet "Queen of Nightmares". She is the secret ruler of the Western Holy Empire, with the lower "Demon Lord" Roy Valentine being her puppet demon lord while she herself is disguised as a maid. Having fought Veldora once many centuries ago, her identity is exposed by him during the Walpurgis. She also appears in the spin-off series Visions of Coleus where she attempts to stop the Primordial Violet's troublesome antics. Unlike most of her subordinates, she does not appear to bear any hostility towards Rimuru and their followers. She owns the borders of the Magic Continent's west region.
Hinata Sakaguchi (ヒナタ・サカグチ, Sakaguchi Hinata)
Voiced by: Manami Numakura (Japanese); Alexis Tipton (English)
An Otherworlder and former student of Shizu. She works as a knight for the Holy Western Empire. She is an immensely formidable individual, stated to be much more powerful than Shizu and Ifrit at age fifteen. She has the ability to steal her opponents' skills during battle, though she soon loses this skill. During Falmuth's invasion of the Jura Tempest Foundation, Yuuki and Clayman set Rimuru up against Hinata, as the latter wishes to avenge her teacher (unaware that Shizu genuinely asked Rimuru to devour her). Rimuru proves to be no match for her at the time due to an anti-magic barrier in the area, but they manage to survive her attack and deceive her into thinking she had succeeded. Sometime later, she drives Laplace away from the empire. Once she found out that Rimuru is still alive and is much stronger than before, she began to regret her actions and viewed them differently after learning that they aren't malevolent, but also suspects that she's being manipulated. She soon receives a message from Rimuru challenging her to a duel and travels to Tempest for a rematch, unaware that the message is fake. During their second fight, she is injured by the sword that the Seven Luminaries gave her, which is a trap that the Luminaries rigged to kill them both. Luminous later heals her and she finally makes peace with Rimuru. During the battle against Granville, she is killed while trying to protect Chloe, but her soul has entered Chloe's body as she is sent back in time where she helps Chloe change the future so to end Chloe's endless time jumps and prevent her and Rimuru's deaths in the original timeline's future, eventually putting themselves in stasis inside the Holy Ark when their past selves arrived in the Central World. In the present time, she is eventually awakened and revived.
Roy Valentine (ロイ・ヴァレンタイン, Roi Varentain)
Voiced by: Masaaki Mizunaka (Japanese); Gabe Kunda (English)
Roy is the vampire body double for Demon Lord Luminous Valentine, who serves as emperor of the Holy Empire on her orders. When Veldora reveals his master's identity at Walpurgis, he steps down from the seat of Demon Lord and returns to protect the empire for her, after Clayman's demise. Back in the empire, he encounters Laplace fleeing from Hinata Sakaguchi and taunts him about Clayman's demise. Sent into a fit of rage, Laplace easily kills Roy by ripping his heart out and crushing it.
Louis Valentine (ルイ・ヴァレンタイン, Rui Varentain)
Voiced by: Masaaki Mizunaka (Japanese); Gabe Kunda (English)
Louis is the Holy Emperor of Lubelius, a subordinate of Demon Lord Luminous Valentine and her proxy in controlling the citizens of Lubelius, while his deceased younger twin brother Roy Valentine played the role of the evil Demon Lord to unite the populace of Lubelius under Louis.
Gunther Strauss (ギュンター・シュトラウス, Gyuntā Shutorausu)
Voiced by: Kousuke Katayama (Japanese); Shogo Miyakita (English)
A butler who works for Luminous Valentine. He is part of the archduke class, the highest of vampire nobles, and is tasked with handling the affairs of the Night Garden.
Arnaud Bauman (アルノー・バウマン, Aruno Bauman)
Voiced by: Eiji Takemoto (Japanese); Chris Hackney (English)
Arnaud Bauman of Space is one of the Captains of Crusaders and a member of the Ten Great Saints, considered the second strongest Holy Knight after Hinata Sakaguchi, his direct leader. He accompanies Hinata to Tempest after she receives a false message from Rimuru challenging her, and later joins the fight between Leonard and Garde's army and Tempest's army. He fights Benimaru and ends up losing. After learning that he had been duped, he officially makes peace with Rimuru's nation.
Bacchus (バッカス, Bakkasu)
Voiced by: Hajime Iijima (Japanese); Edward Bosco (English)
Bacchus of Earth is a quiet and sturdy older man and a member of the Ten Great Saints. He accompanies Hinata to Tempest after she receives a false message from Rimuru challenging her, and later joins the fight between Leonard and Garde's army and Tempest's army. He and Fritz fight Albis and Suphia and they end up losing. After learning that he had been duped, he officially makes peace with Rimuru's nation.
Leonard Jester (レナード・ジェスター, Renādo Jesuta)
Voiced by: Kenji Nojima (Japanese); Chris Niosi (English)
Leonard the Childe of Light is the calm and observant vice-chief of the Crusaders of the Western Holy Empire and a member of the Ten Great Saints. He secretly accompanies Hinata to Tempest after she receives a false message from Rimuru challenging her, but intends to wage war rather than negotiate at the direction of the Seven Luminaries. They fight Shion, but she proves to be too strong for them, forcing them to admit defeat. He is injured after discovering that he had been duped, but Hinata heals him and he officially makes peace with Rimuru's nation.
Litus (リティス, Ritusu)
Voiced by: Haruka Aikawa (Japanese); Rebecca Wang (English)
Litus of Water is a young and slim girl and a member of the Ten Great Saints. She accompanies Hinata to Tempest after she receives a false message from Rimuru challenging her, and later joins the fight between Leonard and Garde's army and Tempest's army, engaging Souei in a one-on-one duel and develops a crush on him after he defeated her. After learning that she had been duped, she officially makes peace with Rimuru's nation.
Garde (ギャルド, Gāde)
Voiced by: Wataru Komada (Japanese); Xander Mobus (English)
Garde of Fire is one of the Captains of the Crusaders and a member of the Ten Great Saints, who is a skilled fire mage who wields the fire spear – "Red Spear". He secretly accompanies Hinata to Tempest after she receives a false message from Rimuru challenging her, but intends to wage war rather than negotiate at the direction of the Seven Luminaries. They fight Shion, but she proves to be too strong for them, forcing them to admit defeat. It is later revealed that he was killed and impersonated by Ars.
Fritz (フリッツ, Furitsu)
Voiced by: Taishi Murata (Japanese); Zeno Robinson (English)
Fritz of Wind is a member of the Ten Great Saints and a skilled warrior, who uses a combination of Wind Spirit Magic and Swordsmanship. He accompanies Hinata to Tempest after she receives a false message from Rimuru challenging her, and later joins the fight between Leonard and Garde's army and Tempest's army. He and Bacchus fight Albis and Suphia and they end up losing. After learning that he had been duped, he officially makes peace with Rimuru's nation.
Saare (サーレ, Sāre)
Voiced by: Shōya Chiba (Japanese); A.J. Beckles (English)
Saare of Blue Sky is a member of the Ten Great Saints who has an ongoing rivalry with Hinata, because he lost his position as head of the Rock Geniuses in the army of the Holy Emperor to her. He does not accompany Hinata to Tempest after she receives a false message from Rimuru challenging her, instead taking part in Falmuth's civil war. After he and Glenda fight Diablo, he soon learns the truth behind the Luminaries' motives and makes peace with Tempest after the Luminaries are defeated.
Grigori (グレゴリー, Gurigori)
Voiced by: Masashi Yamane (Japanese); Brent Mukai (English)
Grigori of Giant Boulder is a member of the Ten Great Saints and Saare's right hand man who possesses the ability to harden his body, also known as the "Immovable" for his defense. He does not accompany Hinata to Tempest after she receives a false message from Rimuru challenging her, instead taking part in Falmuth's civil war.
Nikolaus Spertus (ニコラウス・シュペルタス, Nikorausu Shuperutasu)
Voiced by: Makoto Yasumura (Japanese); Nicholas Andrew Louie (English)
He is a cardinal of the Western Holy Church and its second-highest ranked member after Louis.
Dina (ディナ)
Voiced by: Hiroki Maeda (Japanese); Bob Carter (English)
The Luminary of the Moon and one of the Seven Luminaries and follower of Luminous, who plot to destroy Rimuru and Hinata using Leonard and Garde. He and his comrades are killed by Luminous and Diablo.
Ars (アーズ, Āzu)
Voiced by: Kenta Sasa (Japanese); Sean Hennigan (English)
The Luminary of Mars and one of the Seven Luminaries and follower of Luminous, who plot to destroy Rimuru and Hinata using Leonard and Garde. It is revealed that he killed and impersonated the Saint Garde. He and his comrades are killed by Luminous and Diablo.
Meris (メリス, Merisu)
Voiced by: Akira Koga (Japanese); Mick Lauer (English)
The Luminary of Mercury and one of the Seven Luminaries and follower of Luminous, who plot to destroy Rimuru and Hinata using Leonard and Garde. He and his comrades are killed by Luminous and Diablo.
Salun (サルン, Sarun)
Voiced by: Ryuunosuke Watanuki (Japanese); Jeremy Schwartz (English)
The Luminary of Jupiter and one of the Seven Luminaries and follower of Luminous, who plot to destroy Rimuru and Hinata using Leonard and Garde. He and his comrades are killed by Luminous and Diablo.
Vina (ヴィナ, Vina)
Voiced by: Ryou Sugisaki (Japanese); Kent Williams (English)
The Luminary of Venus and one of the Seven Luminaries and follower of Luminous, who plot to destroy Rimuru and Hinata using Leonard and Garde. He and his comrades are killed by Luminous and Diablo.
Zaus (ザウス, Zausu)
Voiced by: Hayato Kimura (Japanese); Imari Williams (English)
The Luminary of Saturn and one of the Seven Luminaries and follower of Luminous, who plot to destroy Rimuru and Hinata using Leonard and Garde. She and her comrades are killed by Luminous and Diablo.

== Sorcery Dynasty of Thalion ==
An ancient elven kingdom of powerful mages and sorcerers, built on top of a forest of giant trees. This area is controlled by Elmesia El-Ru Thalion. Frey once tried to conquer this kingdom in the past.

Elmesia El-Ru Thalion (エルメシア・エル・リュ・サリオン, Erumeshia Eru Ryu Sarion)
Voiced by: Hisako Kanemoto (Japanese); Amber Lee Connors (English)
Elmesia is a beautiful but androgynous elf woman with a youthful appearance that one could mistake for a child, despite her being the 2000 year old empress of the Sorcery Dynasty of Thalion.
Elalude Grimwald (エラルド・グリムワルト, Erarudo Gurimuwaruto)
Voiced by: Kenji Hamada (Japanese); Robert McCollum (English)
He is the Archduke of the Sorcerous Dynasty of Thalion as well as Elen/Elyun's father. Upon hearing that his daughter has befriended the newly evolved Demon Lord Rimuru Tempest, he warily arrives to investigate. At the behest of his daughter and old friend, King Gazel Dwargo, he sits down for a diplomatic meeting between Rimuru and all their allies, after which he quickly befriends Rimuru, officially announcing his country's alliance with the Jura Tempest Foundation.

== Eastern Empire ==
The Nasca Namrium Ulmeria United Eastern Empire, commonly known as the Eastern Empire, is a large military nation that is known as the strongest nation in the entire world, founded by the legendary hero, Rudra, who also serves as its ruler.

Damrada (ダムラダ, Damurada)
Voiced by: Daisuke Namikawa (Japanese); Keith Silverstein (English)
Damrada of Gold is one of the three governing officials of Cerberus, the most powerful underground organization in the east. He is also the vice commander of Rudra's Imperial Guardians as 002 in the sequence. He holds a grudge against Rimuru for killing Clayman. Recently, he worked for Yuuki and the Rozzo family.
Masayuki Rudra Nam Ul Nasca (マサユキ・ルドラ・ナム・ウル・ナスカ, Masayuki Rudora Namu Uru Nasuka)
Voiced by: Yoshitsugu Matsuoka (Japanese); Micah Solusod (English)
Typically shortened to simply Masayuki or Rudra, he is the emperor of the Eastern Empire and a legendary historic figure. He is technically an Otherworlder who uniquely serves as both a person of legend and as the current hero Lightspeed Masayuki of Team Lightspeed simultaneously due to him and his corrupted past self existing in the same space-time. His older self's wife and empress is Velgrynd, the third oldest of the True Dragons.
Jiwu (ジウ, Jiu)
Voiced by: Konomi Inagaki (Japanese); Xanthe Huynh (English)
Jiwu is a member of Team Lightspeed and is the personal bodyguard of Masayuki.
Jinrai (ジンライ)
Voiced by: Tarō Kiuchi (Japanese); Patrick Seitz (English)
Jinrai is an adventurer from the Kingdom of Ingrassia. He is the first member who joined Masayuki's party after arriving to the Central World, currently acting as the vanguard of the team.
Bernie (バーニィ, Bānyi)
Voiced by: Shōya Ishige (Japanese); Joel McDonald (English)
Bernie is originally a 45-year old Otherworlder from the United States, who is an adventurer and member of Masayuki's party.
Velgrynd (ヴェルグリンド, Verugurindo)
Velgrynd, also known as Scorch Dragon (灼熱竜, Shakunetsuryū), is the third-oldest of the five True Dragons and one of the most powerful beings in the world, the wife of the legendary hero Masayuki, as well as empress of the Eastern Empire.
Misha (ミーシャ, Mīsha)
Voiced by: Hana Satō (Japanese); Corey Pettit (English)
A femme fatale member of Cerberus, who replaces Damrada with aiding Yuuki with his schemes.

== Kingdom of Seltrosso ==
The Kingdom of Seltrosso is a small kingdom with a population of two million, bordering the Kingdom of Farmenas and the Kingdom of Englassia, facing the North Sea. It is ruled by the Rozzo family, and through the Council of the West founded by Granville, holds strong influence over the Western Nations alongside the Five Elders.

Granville Rozzo (グランベル・ロッゾ, Guranberu Rozzo)
Voiced by: Daisuke Ono (Japanese); Michael Sorich (English)
Granville is head of the Rozzo family, an influential family in the Kingdom of Seltrozzo, and secretly the Luminary of Sun "Gran" as well as co-leader of the Five Elders, who secretly try to control the Council of the West. He is also a former Chosen Hero. He schemed to eliminate Rimuru and Hinata with the help of the Seven Luminaries. His plan failed and he narrowly avoids being killed by Nikolaus. He and Maribel make another attempt to take down Tempest using Duke Muese, but this plan also ended in failure. Following Mariabel's death, he made one last attempt to destroy Rimuru along with Leon and Luminous by tricking Yuuki into awakening Chronoa. He is eventually killed by Luminous. Before dying, he is still confident that Chronoa will eliminate anything that threatens mankind in the future. He reunites with Maria and Razul in the afterlife.
Mariabel Rozzo (マリアベル・ロッゾ, Mariaberu Rozzo)
Voiced by: Inori Minase (Japanese); Kira Buckland (English)
Maribel is Granville's granddaughter and an avaricious Otherworlder, as well as the reincarnation of his wife and co-leader of the Five Elders. She and her grandfather plotted to eliminate Hinata and Rimuru using the Seven Luminaries, but the plan was unsuccessful. She and Granville make another attempt to take down Tempest using Duke Muese, but this plan also ended in failure. As an alternative, Mariabel makes a third attempt to destroy Rimuru during a meeting with the Council of the West. After another failure, she moved in to defeat Rimuru herself, but is eventually killed by Yuuki.
Muese (ミューゼ, Myūze)
Voiced by: Yōhei Azakami (Japanese); SungWon Cho (English)
A duke who works for the Rozzo family. After the end of Tempest's festival, he planned to make Tempest be indebted to the Five Elders so they can bring Tempest down from within, but the plan failed as Rimuru already got the money he needed to pay the merchants from Elmesia. He is eventually murdered for his failures.
Johann Rostia (ヨハン ロスティア, Yohan Rosutia)
Voiced by: Yuuki Ishikari (Japanese); Johnathon Ha (English)
One of the Five Elders, who aids the Rozzo family in their war against Rimuru. He later works with Team Green Fury to destroy the Council of the West for allying with Tempest with the help of Misery, but Testarossa thwarts this plan and he is arrested.
Gaban (ギャバン, Gyaban)
Voiced by: Kensuke Shimizu (Japanese); Christopher Corey Smith (English)
Count Gaban is another member of Five Elders who tried to take down Rimuru using Elric, but his plan failed and he is arrested.
Razul (ラズル, Razuru)
Voiced by: Taiten Kusunoki (Japanese); Mike Smith (English)
A powerful insectoid general who works for Granville. He was named by Granville, still the Hero Gran at the time. He is eventually killed by Shion and Ranga and his soul is absorbed into Granville to empower himself. He reunites with Granville in the afterlife.
Maria Rozzo (マリア・ロッゾ, Maria Rozzo)
Voiced by: Inori Minase
Granville's wife and Maribel's previous incarnation, who was murdered in the past. Granville kept her corpse and later animated it to help him in his war against the Demon Lords. She is killed by Luminous and her corpse is absorbed into Granville to empower him. She reunites with Granville in the afterlife.

== City of the Forgotten Dragon ==
This is Milim's domain, populated by dragon descendants. The Dragon Faithful manage this city. After Carrion and Frey became Milim's subordinates, Milim was forced to be a more responsible ruler and Rimuru also had a castle built for her in the city.

Milim Nava (ミリム・ナーヴァ, Mirimu Nāba)
Voiced by: Rina Hidaka (Japanese); Kristen McGuire (English)
Milim is a dragonoid and one of the strongest and most ancient True Demon Lords; daughter of the True Dragon Veldanava, making her Veldora and Velzard's niece. She is also the most carefree and whimsical, only being concerned with interesting things. Milim is known as the "Destroyer", a "Catastrophe-level" Demon Lord whose power is the epitome of destruction itself. She befriends Rimuru and frequently visits Tempest, only to cause them nothing but stress and problems from her unintentional mischief; aside from Rimuru, she hangs out with her uncle and fellow Demon Lord, Ramiris, who prior to the story was her only friend. Clayman brainwashes her to help him with his schemes to take down Rimuru under orders from Yuuki, but she later reveals that she was pretending all along and that the necklace used to mind control her (which Clayman got from Kagali and Yuuki) had no effect. Following Clayman's defeat, she gains two new subordinates: Frey and Carrion, after they stepped down from their role as Demon Lords. She owns the east region of the Magic Continent.
Middray (ミッドレイ, Middorei)
Voiced by: Atsushi Imaruoka (Japanese); Jason Douglas (English)
Middray is a powerful Dragonewt and the Head Priest of the Dragon Faithful that worships Milim Nava. Unlike Gabil and the other Lizardmen, he is a born Dragonewt, out of the communion between a human and a dragon. During Walpurgis, he was manipulated into siding with Clayman and faces off against Gabil and Suphia, defeating them, before Benimaru arrives to calm the air.
Hermes (ヘルメス, Herumesu)
Voiced by: Daiki Kobayashi (Japanese); Howard Wang (English)
Hermes is Middray's young assistant and a priest of the Dragon Faithful that worships Milim Nava.
Gaia (ガイア)
Voiced by: Hana Hishikawa (Japanese); Brooklyn Wade (English)
Milim's pet elemental dragon, who was killed years ago, but was revived as the Chaos Dragon and was imprisoned by Milim. Maribel and Yuuki later free him in their attempt to defeat Rimuru and Milim, but the latter two defeat it and transform it back into egg, and it is later reborn. A grateful Milim then names Gaia. However, Gaia must stay in Tempest's Dungeon to survive.

== Octagram, the Eight-Star Demon Lords ==
A powerful group of eight Demon Lords. It was previously called the Ten Great Demon Lords, but they became eight following Clayman's demise and after Frey and Carrion stepped down from their positions as Demon Lords to serve Demon Lord Milim Nava. Alongside Rimuru, Milim, and Luminous, they have control over most of the Central World.

Guy Crimson (ギィ・クリムゾン, Gii Kurimuzon)
Voiced by: Akira Ishida (Japanese); Anthony Bowling (English)
The Primordial Demon called Rouge, or Red, he is one of the first True Demon Lords to exist as well as one of the strongest beings in existence and is classified as "Catastrophe-level". His epithet is "Lord of Darkness". He takes a liking to Rimuru after he learns that Rimuru has gained the Primordial Demon Black or Noir as their subordinate, Diablo. He has a sexual attraction to the Demon Lord Leon Cromwell, a friend. Veldora's older sister, Velzard, is one of his closest confidants. He owns the Ice Continent.
Ramiris (ラミリス, Ramirisu)
Voiced by: Anzu Haruno (Japanese); Jad Saxton (English)
One of the oldest True Demon Lords along with Guy and Milim. Ramiris is a fairy and the former Spirit Queen who reincarnates whenever she perishes. Able to create and control an alternate dimension known as the labyrinth, Ramiris guards the dwelling of spirits from would-be trespassers. She is known by the epithet "Labyrinth Master". She later moves to Jura Forest and is allowed to use her labyrinth as a tourist attraction (which is now referred to as the Dungeon) akin to an RPG. She shares a love of manga with Veldora, who crafts them from Rimuru's memories.
Leon Cromwell (レオン・クロムウェル, Reon Kuromuweru)
Voiced by: Jun Fukuyama (Japanese); Christopher Wehkamp (English)
A powerful Demon Lord who summoned Shizu. Upon finding that she has an affinity of fire, he had her body bound to Ifrit. Leon is an old friend of Chloe's, but hasn't been able to find her due to a ridiculously complicated temporal loop leaving her existence unstable. He is a rarity among demon lords, as he is a Summoned Otherworlder and a former True Hero, who gained his status after killing Demon Lord Kazalim and a demonoid. He is known by the epithets "Platinum Saber" and "Platinum Devil". He owns the minor continent El Dorado.
Dagruel (ダグリュール, Daguryūru)
Voiced by: Rikiya Koyama (Japanese); Jarrod Greene (English)
A reasonable giant Demon Lord, who has sparred against Veldora many times centuries ago and managed to stay on nearly equal ground. His epithet is "Earthquake". He owns the Magic Continent's west region (excluding the region's borders, which are owned by Luminous).
Dino (ディーノ, Dino)
Voiced by: Yūsuke Kobayashi (Japanese); Dallas Reid (English)
A fallen angel Demon Lord who is extremely lazy and tends to sleep all the time, even through most of the meeting of Demon Lords at Walpurgis and has the epithet "Sleeping Ruler". After losing his home, he now works in Tempest's dungeon.

== Kingdom of Coleus ==
A nation located to the far west, on the border between the Western Nations and the Barren Lands. It has a strong Arabian-style culture and mandatory military service. The kingdom is currently controlled by Sauzer Coleus after his tyrannical father was killed. It also became a part of Rimuru's territory.

Aslan Coleus (アスラン コリウス, Asuran Koriusu)
Voiced by: Masaya Matsukaze (Japanese); Ben Stegmair (English)
One of the princes of Coleus and the brother of Sauzer and Zenobia. He is manipulated by the Arch Demon Gustav and his father Tedron into fighting his brother so that either him or Sauzer will be used as a new vessel for their father. Following Gustav's defeat and the death of his evil father, he became the Minister of Defense.
Sauzer Coleus (サウザー コリウス, Sauzā Koriusu)
Voiced by: Atsushi Tamaru (Japanese); Matt Holmes (English)
One of the princes of Coleus and the brother of Aslan and Zenobia. He is manipulated by the Arch Demon Gustav and his father Tedron into fighting his brother so that either him or Aslan will be used as a new vessel for their father. Following Gustav's defeat and the death of his evil father, he became the king of Coleus.
Zenobia Coleus (ゼノビア コリウス, Zenobia Koriusu)
Voiced by: Natsumi Hioka (Japanese); Kelly Greenshield (English)
The princess of Coleus and the sister of Aslan and Zenobia who was made ill by Gustav, who is working for her wicked father Tedron, so that the Primordial Violet could use her as a vessel. Although Gustav was successful, Zenobia was not yet a suitable vessel for Violet and the Demon Lord Luminous Valentine knows the truth of their scheme, leading Violet to kill Gustav for his failure and then leaves Zenobia's body. She then recovers afterwards.
Paulo (パウロ, Pauro)
Voiced by: Nobuhiko Okamoto (Japanese); Ryan Negrón (English)
A warrior who accompanies Rimuru to Coleus to help stop the Arch Demon Gustav. Following Gustav's defeat, he decides to remain in Coleus.
Tedron Coleus (テドロン コリウス, Tedoron Koriusu)
Voiced by: Reigo Yamaguchi
The cruel former king of Coleus and the father of Aslan, Sauzer, and Zenobia. It was he who summoned Gustav and Karl in the first place with the intention of having his daughter being used as a vessel for Violet, all while hoping to use one of his sons as a new vessel for himself after manipulating them into fighting each other, but the plan was foiled by Rimuru and Luminous Valentine, who later kills him for his misdeeds and playing a major part in Violet's ploy.
Gustav (グスタフ, Gusutafu)
Voiced by: Masayuki Katō (Japanese); Mark Allen Jr. (English)
An Arch Demon who was summoned by Tedron Coleus to help provide a vessel for Violet using his daughter Zenobia. In turn, they will help Tedron convert one of his sons into a new vessel for him after the other is killed. He idolizes Violet and although he is successful in placing her inside of Zenobia, Violet did not like her vessel because it was not yet a proper one for her. Also, Luminous Valentine knows the truth of their plot and Violet cannot defeat her even though Gustav believes otherwise. Gustav is killed by Violet for his screw up before she leaves Zenobia's body.
Karl (カール, Kāru)
Voiced by: Kazuyuki Okitsu (Japanese); Justin Cook (English)
An Arch Demon who was summoned by Tedron Coleus to help provide a vessel for Violet using his daughter Zenobia. In turn, they will help Tedron convert one of his sons into a new vessel for him after the other is killed. He is Gustav's right hand man. During the fight against Rimuru, he is killed by Gustav so that he can finish inserting Violet inside of Zenobia.
Barak Jahil (バラク ジャヒル, Baraku Jahiru)
Voiced by: Fuminori Komatsu (Japanese); Ben Bryant (English)
The head of the Coleus Royal Guard and the personal advisor to Sauzer Coleus. He is also Chiffon's husband.
Chiffon Jahil (シフォン ジャヒル, Shifon Jahiru)
Voiced by: Kaori Nazuka (Japanese); Lydia Mackay (English)
She is Barak's wife, and Jeff and Ulamuth's younger sister.

== Kingdom of Raja ==
A small nation located west of the Jura Tempest Federation. It is currently controlled by Queen Towa. The kingdom is also an ally to the Jura Tempest Federation.

Hiiro (ヒイロ, Hīro)
Voiced by: Yuma Uchida (Japanese); Jonah Scott (English)
An ogre born in the same village as Benimaru and his friends, whom he is close friends with. He one day decided to venture out as a mercenary alongside a small group of fellow ogres. After surviving an ambush from Yamza, he and his men were retrieved by the nearby kingdom of Raja, but with little medical aid, they had been unable to heal their mortal wounds. Raja's queen, Towa decided to grant Hiiro his name, hoping it would allow him to survive his injuries. Upon waking up, Hiiro immediately set off to his village on the back of one of Raja's dragons. He arrived at the ruined village, too late to help them fend off the orcs. He decided to return to Raja afterwards and dedicating himself to repaying the debt he owed to the nation's queen, swearing loyalty to her. He soon traveled to Tempest to seek help from Rimuru to cure Towa's illness. It is soon discovered that it is the work of the Daemon Lacua, who seeks to have Towa become a vessel for the Primordial Violet and Hiiro is tricked into swallowing a piece of Charybdis, turning him into a savage monster before eventually ripping it out and destroying it; this causes him to disintegrate, but Towa manages to revive him.
Towa (トワ, Towa)
Voiced by: Riko Fukumoto (Japanese); Cherami Leigh (English)
The queen of Raja. She has used the magical power of her tiara created by Violet, which has been passed down in the royal family from generation to generation, to neutralize the poison in the mines of her country and protect the people of Raja. However, the price to pay for this was a curse that ate away at her life, which is part of Violet's bet with her ancestors to gain a vessel. Following the defeat of Violet's subordinate Lacua, she sacrifices her life to revive Hiiro, but Violet revives her as a reward for all the entertainment she gave her and as an apology as Lacua's unauthorized actions had constituted as unfair interference on her part of the bet and thus ruined her fun.
Lacua (ラキュア, Rakyua)
Voiced by: Subaru Kimura (Japanese); Tony Oliver (English)
A Daemon descended from Violet. He took the guise of a peddler who frequented Raja and dealt in rare and precious gems while he secretly ensured the continued use of the tiara by Towa from behind the scenes in order to help Violet gain a vessel. But after deciding to take matters in his own hands against Violet's orders, she is forced to void the contract she made with Towa and cut ties with Lacua. He then blows himself up to try and destroy Raja, but Rimuru contains the explosion.
Chikuan (チクアン, Chikuan)
Voiced by: Shinpachi Tsuji (Japanese); Greg Dulcie (English)
An Elven physician in the service of Towa. He is later revealed to be an ally to Lacua and is later killed by Ranga.
Fuji (フジ, Fuji)
Voiced by: Sekai Yamamoto (Japanese); Ben Balmaceda (English)
A knight from Raja who is one of Hiiro's subordinates. He accompanies Hiiro to Tempest.
Kikyō (キキョウ, Kikyou)
Voiced by: Kurumi Karikawa (Japanese); Sara Ragsdale (English)
A knight from Raja who is one of Hiiro's subordinates. She accompanies Hiiro to Tempest.
Mobuji (モブジ, Mobuji)
Voiced by: Mitsuru Ogata (Japanese); Mark Stoddard (English)
The Prime Minister of Raja who has watched over Towa since long ago.

== Kingdom of Kaien ==
An underwater nation located near the Resort Island that is owned by Elmesia. It is ruled by King Lete. A Water Dragon protects the kingdom.

Yura (ユラ)
Voiced by: Saori Ōnishi (Japanese); Allegra Clark (English)
A shrine maiden from Kaien. She is revealed to be the Water Dragon's core. Gobta develops feelings for her, but she herself later reveals that she really isn't in love with him. She later dissolves into bubbles after Djeese and Zodon are defeated.
Djeese (ジース, Jīsu)
Voiced by: Kōji Yusa (Japanese); Yuri Lowenthal (English)
A minister who plans to use the Water Dragon to invade the surface. His plans were foiled by Rimuru and his friends. He is then killed by Zodon, who was using him the whole time.
Zodon (ゾドン)
Voiced by: Koichi Domoto (Japanese); Christopher Corey Smith (English)
A minister who plans to marry Yura and use her in his plans for world domination. He manipulates Djeese into doing his dirty work, but later kills Djeese for his failures. Rimuru eventually kills him and foils his plans.
Lete (レーテ, Rēte)
Voiced by: TBA (Japanese); Lucien Dodge (English)
The king of Kaien. He was tricked by Djeese and Zodon into thinking that Yura had betrayed the kingdom and that the Demon Lords are attempting to attack the kingdom.
Yori (ヨリ) and Mio (ミオ)
Voiced by: Kaho Fujishima (Japanese); Marianne Bray (English) (Yori)
Voiced by: Nao Kosaka (Japanese); Natalie Van Sistine (English) (Mio)
Yura's maids and bodyguards.

== Other characters ==
Tamura (田村, Tamura)
Voiced by: Ryōta Suzuki (Japanese); Jordan Dash Cruz (English)
A junior who worked at the same company as Satoru Mikami. He and his fiancé Miho Sawatari had asked to meet Satoru to ask for advice. During their meeting, a person was running with a kitchen knife and was about to stab Tamura when Satoru pushed him aside to take the blow. As Satoru died, Tamura was entrusted with his dying wish to destroy the contents on his PC. He fulfilled his promise by turning the computer on in a bathtub of water and also intended to name his child after him. Unbeknownst to him, Satoru was reborn in another world as a slime monster named Rimuru Tempest.
Miho Sawatari (沢渡美穂, Sawatari Miho)
Voiced by: Yuka Nukui (Japanese); Kristi Rothrock (English)
Tamura's fiancée; whom Satoru protected from a criminal who tried to attack them.
Shizue Izawa (井沢 静江, Izawa Shizue)
Voiced by: Yumiri Hanamori (Japanese); Dawn M. Bennett (English)
Shizue, also known by her nickname Shizu (シズ), is a Japanese girl and an Otherworlder who was summoned into this world during the Bombing of Tokyo. Her summoning was considered a failure, and she was abandoned after having a fire spirit named Ifrit bound to her body. Soon after, she gained the title "Conqueror of Flames". Shizu is actually of elderly age, but has not outwardly aged past her prime thanks to Ifrit's possession. She figures out that Rimuru was also once from Japan and in their short time together, they become good friends. She had also formed good friendships with Kabal's Party, Class S, and Hinata. Ifrit was soon able to gain control of her after she was weak enough, but Rimuru defeated Ifrit and separated him from Shizu. Without Ifrit, she began to quickly age. Before passing away, she requested her body to be devoured by Rimuru (as she did not want to be buried), giving them a human form that resembles a younger version of Shizu. Shizu's soul still remains inside of Rimuru. When Rimuru enters Chronoa's mind, Shizu's spirit appears to help him save Chloe and Hinata.
Orthos (オルトス, Orutosu)
Voiced by: Kazuyuki Okitsu (Japanese); Patrick Seitz (English)
Orthos was an Arch-Demon descendant of Rouge and the true king of the Kingdom of Filtwood. He tried to trick adventurers into a hunt for demons, including Shizue Izawa, where he would actually kill them to become more powerful. The Primordial Demon Noir revealed his presence at the gathering of adventurers, where Shizu fought him and entranced him with her unique mask, which would lead to his infatuation with Rimuru. Orthos attempts to trap Shizu in the guise of congratulating her for fighting Noir and living, but she sees through the trap. However, Orthos proves to be too powerful for Shizu, weakened by her fight with Noir. Luckily for her, Noir arrives to save her and erases Orthos's soul from existence.
Frey (フレイ, Furei)
Voiced by: Sayaka Ohara (Japanese); Lisa Ortiz (English)
A Harpy known as the Sky Queen and a former Demon Lord, who relinquished her status and swore obedience to her friend Milim, after realizing she was weaker than awakened Clayman, who roped her into his schemes (although she secretly plotted against him), before the new Demon Lord Rimuru annihilated him. She is the ruler of the Harpy Queendom of Fulbrosia, which is currently a part of Milim's territory.
Velzard (ヴェルザード, Veruzādo)
Voiced by: Yuka Iguchi (Japanese); AmaLee (English)
Velzard is the eldest sister of Veldora Tempest, thus one of the four True Dragons, known as the White Ice Dragon. She inhabits the northern continent as Guy's closest confidant, not particularly interested in the affairs of the world. She has a particular disdain for Guy's friend, the Demon Lord Leon Cromwell.
Misery (ミザリ, Mizari)
Voiced by: Yuuki Hirose (Japanese); Kara Edwards (English)
Also known as 'Vert' or "Primordial of Green", she is the Green Primordial Daemon and a subordinate of fellow Primordial, Rouge, Guy Crimson. Team Green Fury worships her as their god, yet she does not seem to care about them.
Rain (レイン, Rein)
Voiced by: Eri Yukimura (Japanese); Jenny Yokobori (English)
Also known as 'Bleu' or "Primordial of Blue", she is the Blue Primordial Daemon and a subordinate of fellow Primordial, Rouge, Guy Crimson.
Kaede (楓)
Voiced by: Yūko Kaida (Japanese); Erica Schroeder (English)
Kaede is the sickly leader of the Tengu Tribe and Hakuro's former lover as well as mother of their child Momiji.
Gaiye (ガイ, Gai)
Voiced by: Hiromu Mineta (Japanese); Austin Sisk (English)
An arrogant warrior who takes part in Tempest's festival in hopes of challenging Rimuru and Masayuki, but ended up losing both the tournament and the Dungeon challenge. He later worked with Elric and Team Green Fury to take down Rimuru. After being defeated by Shuna, he is arrested. Mariabel later breaks him out and uses him to help her defeat Rimuru, but he is quickly killed.
Ayn (アイン, Ain)
Voiced by: Yurina Amami (Japanese); Marianne Bray (English)
A member of Team Green Fury, a group of adventurers who worship Misery.
Girard (ジラード, Jirādo)
Voiced by: Kouji Okino (Japanese); Kyle Phillips (English)
The leader of Team Green Fury, a group of adventurers who worship Misery.

== See also ==
- List of That Time I Got Reincarnated as a Slime episodes
- List of That Time I Got Reincarnated as a Slime volumes
