= Miho Okasaki =

Japanese voice actress

- 岡咲 美保
- Born: November 22, 1998 (age 27); Okayama Prefecture, Japan
- Other name: Miporin
- Occupations: Voice actress; singer
- Years active: 2017–present
- Agent: I'm Enterprise
- Notable work: Ongaku Shōjo as Miku Nishio; That Time I Got Reincarnated as a Slime as Rimuru Tempest; My Next Life as a Villainess: All Routes Lead to Doom! as Mary Hunt
- Musical career
- Genres: J-Pop; Anison
- Instrument: Vocals
- Years active: 2021–present
- Label: King Records (King Amusement Creative)
- Website: www.okasakimiho.com

Miho Okasaki (岡咲 美保, Okasaki Miho; born November 22, 1998) is a Japanese voice actress and singer from Okayama Prefecture who is affiliated with I'm Enterprise. She debuted as a voice actress in 2017, playing mostly background roles in anime series, as well as playing some roles in a number of video games. In 2018, she played her first main roles as Miku Nishio in the anime series Ongaku Shōjo and Rimuru Tempest in the anime series That Time I Got Reincarnated as a Slime.

== Biography ==
Okasaki was born in Okayama Prefecture on November 22, 1998. Aspiring to become a voice actress since early in her life, she enrolled at the Japan Narration Actor Institute (日本ナレーション演技研究所). After graduating, she became affiliated with the I'm Enterprise agency. She debuted as a voice actress in 2017, playing background and minor roles in anime series such as Love Live! Sunshine!!, Kino's Journey, Aikatsu Stars!, and Classicaloid. She also played roles in the video games Quiz RPG: The World of Mystic Wiz and Hentai Shōjo: Formation Girls, as well as playing several minor roles in the 2018 anime series Idolish7. She would then voice background characters in series such as Ms. Koizumi Loves Ramen Noodles, Citrus, and Slow Start.

In 2018, Okasaki played her first main role as the character Miku Nishino in the anime series Ongaku Shōjo. She also became part of the anime's in-universe musical unit Ongaku Shōjo (音楽少女, Music Girls), which performed the anime's opening theme "On Stage Life" and ending theme "Jumping Peace". She was then cast as Rimuru Tempest, the protagonist of the anime series That Time I Got Reincarnated as a Slime. From July to September 2018, she hosted a radio program that aired on the JOQR station in Tokyo.

On July 1, 2021, she made her solo singer debut under King Records with her first single released on September 15, 2021. "Happiness" (ハピネス) She released her second single, "Petals" (ペタルズ) which was released on November 3, 2021. The song "Petals" was used at the second ending theme song for the anime, The Great Jahy Will Not Be Defeated!.

Okasaki released her first album Blooming on August 17, 2022. The album includes the song "Infinite" which was used as the opening theme to the anime series Extreme Hearts.

== Personal life ==
Okasaki is interested in karaoke and girls' manga. She is skilled at badminton and in playing the piano. She is also skilled in calligraphy and has a grade of three in the use of the brush.

== Filmography ==
=== Television animation ===
2017

- Love Live! Sunshine!! (Female student)
- Classicaloid (Girl)
- Elegant Yokai Apartment Life (Female student D)
- Blood Blockade Battlefront (Children)
- Aikatsu Stars! (Children)

2018

- Idolish7 (High school student A, female customer B, female fan A, others)
- The Disastrous Life of Saiki K. (female B)
- Ms. Koizumi Loves Ramen Noodles (female student A)
- Slow Start (Girl)
- Citrus (Woman)
- Junji Ito Collection (Women)
- Food Wars!: Shokugeki no Soma (female student B)
- Golden Kamuy (Children)
- High School DxD Hero (Fox sister)
- Last Period (MC)
- Hoshin Engi (Daughter)
- Ongaku Shōjo (Miku Nishino)
- Overlord III (Foil)
- Gundam Build Divers (Miyu)
- High Score Girl'
- That Time I Got Reincarnated as a Slime (Rimuru Tempest)

2019

- The Magnificent Kotobuki (Maria)
- Demon Slayer: Kimetsu no Yaiba (Teruko)
- The Case Files of Lord El-Melloi II: Rail Zeppelin Grace Note (Yvette L. Lehrman)

2020

- My Next Life as a Villainess: All Routes Lead to Doom! (Mary Hunt)
- Monster Girl Doctor (Memé Rudon)

2021

- That Time I Got Reincarnated as a Slime Season 2 (Rimuru Tempest)
- The Slime Diaries: That Time I Got Reincarnated as a Slime (Rimuru Tempest)
- My Next Life as a Villainess: All Routes Lead to Doom! X (Mary Hunt)
- The Great Jahy Will Not Be Defeated! (Maō)
- Fena: Pirate Princess (Young Abel Bluefield)

2022

- The Dawn of the Witch (Loux Krystas)
- Extreme Hearts (Saki Kodaka)

2023

- Farming Life in Another World (Flowrem)
- World Dai Star (Iroha Senju)
- A Playthrough of a Certain Dude's VRMMO Life (Milly)

2024

- Jellyfish Can't Swim in the Night (Mero Setō)
- As a Reincarnated Aristocrat, I'll Use My Appraisal Skill to Rise in the World (Rosell Kischa)
- The New Gate (Yuzuha)
- That Time I Got Reincarnated as a Slime Season 3 (Rimuru Tempest)

2025

- I'm a Noble on the Brink of Ruin, So I Might as Well Try Mastering Magic (Chris)
- Private Tutor to the Duke's Daughter (Lynne Leinster)

2026

- Champignon Witch (Merino)
- FX Fighter Kurumi-chan (Yasuko Takane)

2027

- Arcanadea (Velretta)

=== Original net animation ===
2020

- MILGRAM as Mahiru Shiina

2021

- Pokétoon (Jigglypuff)

2022

- Tales of Luminaria: The Fateful Crossroad (Celia Arvier)

2026

- Cyberpunk: Edgerunners 2 (Jessie)

=== Anime films ===
2021

- Seitokai Yakuindomo: The Movie 2 (Yū Hirose)
- Knights of Sidonia: Love Woven in the Stars (Itsuki Hanma)

2022

- Idol Bu Show (Mirei Wakatsuki)
- That Time I Got Reincarnated as a Slime the Movie: Scarlet Bond (Rimuru Tempest)

2023

- My Next Life as a Villainess: All Routes Lead to Doom! The Movie (Mary Hunt)

=== Video games ===
2017

- Quiz RPG: The World of Mystic Wiz (Aspina)
- Hentai Shōjo: Formation Girls (Amy Johnson)

2018

- Grand Chase: Dimensional Chaser (Sasha)

2019

- Magia Record (Hanna Sarasa)

2020

- Azur Lane (Cooper)
- The Idolmaster Shiny Colors (Hinana Ichikawa)
- Sword Art Online: Alicization Lycoris (Medina Orthinanos)
- Guardian Tales (Goddess of War Plitvice)
- Grand Summoners (Vicorie)

2021

- Alchemy Stars (Ophina, Dayna)
- Umamusume: Pretty Derby (Kiryuin Aoi)
- Honkai Impact 3 (Klein)
- That Time I Got Reincarnated as a Slime: Isekai Memories (Rimuru Tempest, Emils)

2022

- Counter:Side (Edith Twins)
- Koumajo Remilia: Scarlet Symphony (Suika Ibuki)
- Goddess of Victory: Nikke (Anis)

2024

- Wuthering Waves (Danjin)

2026

- Kyoto Xanadu (Fuka Rikudo)

TBA

- Grimm Echoes (Clock Rabbit)

=== Drama CDs ===
2018

- Wandering Witch: The Journey of Elaina (Avelia)
