= That Time I Got Reincarnated as a Slime season 1 =

That Time I Got Reincarnated as a Slime
- Season 1
- Key visual
- No. of episodes: 24

Release
- Original network: Tokyo MX
- Original release: October 2, 2018 – March 19, 2019

Season chronology
- Next → Season 2

That Time I Got Reincarnated as a Slime is an anime television series based on the light novel series of the same title written by Fuse and illustrated by Mitz Vah. The anime is produced by studio Eight Bit and directed by Yasuhito Kikuchi, with Atsushi Nakayama as assistant director, Kazuyuki Fudeyasu handling series composition, Ryouma Ebata designing the characters, and Takahiro Kishida providing monster designs. Elements Garden is composing the music. The series follows a man who is killed and reincarnated in another world as a slime named Rimuru.

The first season aired from October 2, 2018, to March 19, 2019, on Tokyo MX and other channels. (Note: Tokyo MX listed the broadcast times as Monday nights at 24:00, meaning the first broadcast effectively occurred on Tuesday at 12:00 a.m. JST.) The series is simulcast by Crunchyroll with Funimation streaming an English dub as it airs. The season ran for 24 episodes.

The first opening theme song is "Nameless Story" performed by Takuma Terashima, while the first ending theme song is "Another Colony" performed by True. The second opening theme song is "Megurumono" (メグルモノ) performed by Terashima, while the second ending theme song is "Little Soldier" (リトルソルジャー, Ritoru Sorujā) performed by Azusa Tadokoro.

== Episodes ==
| No. overall | No. in season | Title (Note: English translated titles are taken from Crunchyroll) | Directed by (Note: Production staff information is taken from the ending credits of each episode) | Storyboarded by | Chief animation directed by | Original release date |
|---|---|---|---|---|---|---|
| 1 | 1 | "The Storm Dragon, Veldora"; Transliteration: "Boufuu Ryuu Verudora" (Japanese: 暴風竜ヴェルドラ) | Atsushi Nakayama | Yasuhito Kikuchi | Ryōma Ebata | October 2, 2018 |
One day, office worker Satoru Mikami is killed after being stabbed, but not before requesting for his friend to destroy the contents on his computer. He awakens in a cave in an unfamiliar fantasy world to discover that he has been reincarnated as a slime, possessing various skills formed from his final thoughts before death, and also includes an A.I. helper called the Great Sage, residing in his mind. While exploring the cave, gaining new skills along the way with the aid of Great Sage, the slime comes across and befriends an ancient dragon named Veldora, who was sealed in the cave centuries ago. Meanwhile, Satoru's friend keeps his promise by destroying Satoru's computer.
| 2 | 2 | "Meeting the Goblins"; Transliteration: "Goburin-tachi to no Deai" (Japanese: ゴブリンたちとの出会い) | Shintaro Inokawa | Masashi Kojima | Ryōma Ebata | October 9, 2018 |
The slime, who is given the new name of Rimuru Tempest, helps Veldora (who is also given the surname Tempest in return) to find a way to break his seal by using his Predator skill to swallow him inside his body and analyze it from both sides; Veldora's disappearance causes unrest in the outside world. After gaining more skills from swallowing other creatures, Rimuru finds his way out of the cave after three human adventurers, who were sent to search for Veldora's whereabouts, opens the entrance. Rimuru then encounters a group of goblins, who ask for his help in protecting them against a group of Direwolves.
| 3 | 3 | "Battle at the Goblin Village"; Transliteration: "Goburin Mura de no Tatakai" (Japanese: ゴブリン村での戦い) | Shin Tosaka | Takaomi Kanasaki | Junichi Takaoka | October 16, 2018 |
Working together with the goblins, Rimuru battles against the Direwolves and kills their leader, forcing them to surrender. Convincing the goblins and Direwolves to live together in harmony, Rimuru gives them all names, but then passes out for three days due to exhausting his magic. When he wakes up, he discovers the names he had given to the goblins and Direwolves had caused them all to evolve into hobgoblins and Tempest Star Wolves. The son of the Direwolves' deceased leader swears allegiance to him. Realizing that the goblins have no skills to craft houses and clothes, Rimuru and a small group set off to the town of Dwargon to seek help from dwarf artisans.
| 4 | 4 | "In the Kingdom of the Dwarves"; Transliteration: "Dowāfu no Ōkoku Nite" (Japanese: ドワーフの王国にて) | Tokugane Tanizawa | Taizo Yoshida | Kenichirō Katsura | October 23, 2018 |
Arriving at Dwargon with Gobta the goblin, Rimuru ends up getting in a fight with some thugs and is thrown in jail. Rimuru is eventually set free after providing the guards with potions and is introduced to Kaijin the blacksmith. Using the magisteel ore he had gathered in the caves, Rimuru helps Kaijin to fulfill an order of longswords in exchange for his help in providing artisans for the goblin village. As Rimuru and the dwarves celebrate at an elf bar, a figure approaches.
| 5 | 5 | "Hero King, Gazel Dwargo"; Transliteration: "Eiyū-ō Gazeru・Dowarugo" (Japanese: 英雄王ガゼル・ドワルゴ) | Yoshihiro Mori | Junichi Takaoka | Junichi Takaoka | October 30, 2018 |
A fortune teller elf decides to predict Rimuru's destined one, showing him a vision of a girl parting ways with her family. When Vesta, the minister who ordered the swords, arrives and insults Rimuru due to his disgust for monsters, Kaijin punches him in anger, resulting in both him, Rimuru, and the other dwarves getting arrested and put on trial. During the trial, the hero king Gazel Dwargo, who has a history with Kaijin, exiles him and his men, who join Rimuru as his team of artisans. After also exiling Vesta for his dishonest actions, Gazel, noticing Rimuru's connections with Veldora, dispatches a ninja to follow him.
| 6 | 6 | "Shizu" (Japanese: シズ) | Yasuhiro Ito | Masashi Kojima | Kenichirō Katsura | November 6, 2018 |
When Eren, Kaval, and Gido, the group of adventurers that Rimuru saw earlier, have discovered Veldora's disappearance from the cave, they are ordered by a guildmaster to investigate the forest; a masked girl named Shizu asks to join them. When they run into trouble, they are rescued by Rimuru, who recognizes Shizu from the elf's vision. As Shizu reveals she was summoned to this world from Japan during the war, Rimuru shares some of his memories of a modern, peaceful Japan. What Rimuru doesn't know, however, is that Shizu's summoner, the demon king Leon Cromwell, has made her the vessel of the fire spirit Ifrit.
| 7 | 7 | "Conqueror of Flames"; Transliteration: "Bakuen no Shihai-sha" (Japanese: 爆炎の支配者) | Atsushi Nakayama | Masashi Kojima | Kenichirō Katsura | November 13, 2018 |
Shizu recalls the anguish she felt when Ifrit inside her killed her friend after considering her an enemy. Just as Shizu prepares to leave with the adventurers, Ifrit once again takes control of her and unleashes his flames upon the village. With his water attacks proving ineffective, Rimuru copies Eren's ice magic spell to take care of Ifrit's minions. Discovering that he is immune to fire attacks, Rimuru uses his Predator ability to swallow Ifrit, separating him from Shizu in the process and trapping him inside of his stomach along with Veldora.
| 8 | 8 | "Inherited Will"; Transliteration: "Uketsugareru Omoi" (Japanese: 受け継がれる想い) | Takumi Dōyama | Katsumi Terahigashi | Takashi Mamezuka | November 20, 2018 |
Shizu tells Rimuru about someone known as the Hero who took her in and showed her the right path before mysteriously disappearing one day. Sensing her life is coming to an end, Shizu, not wishing her body to remain in this world, asks Rimuru to eat her, giving him the ability to take a human form that resembles a younger version of Shizu. He then informs the others of Shizu's death. The three say their farewells to Shizu through Rimuru's human form and receive new weapons from him before leaving. As Rimuru decides to seek out information on Leon in order to convey Shizu's final words to him, a masked man named Gelmud recruits an orc that he names Geld with the intention of bringing forth a great orc disaster in the forest.
| 9 | 9 | "Attack of the Ogres"; Transliteration: "Dai Kizoku no Shūgeki" (Japanese: 大鬼族の襲撃) | Shin Tosaka | Katsumi Terahigashi | Junichi Takaoka | November 27, 2018 |
As Rimuru familiarizes himself with the form and abilities he inherited from Shizu and Ifrit, he discovers that he is genderless. The goblins come under attack by a group of ogres, who claim Rimuru has been manipulating orcs to attack their village. After a show of strength, Rimuru manages to convince the ogres, with some help of the ogre princess, that he is not their enemy and invites them to the goblin village to talk things over.
| 10 | 10 | "The Orc Lord"; Transliteration: "Ōku Rōdo" (Japanese: オークロード) | Tokugane Tanizawa | Hidetoshi Namura | Kenichirō Katsura | December 4, 2018 |
Learning that the orcs who attacked the ogre village were being led by a masked majin, who is revealed to be Gelmud, Rimuru proposes that the ogres join him as his subordinates. Agreeing to a temporary alliance until the orcs are defeated, Rimuru names the ogres Benimaru, Shuna, Shion, Hakurou, Souei, and Kurobe, evolving them into kijins. Meanwhile, the chieftain of the lizardmen, sensing an Orc Lord is controlling the thousands of orcs heading their way, sends his son, Gabiru, to enlist help from goblins.
| 11 | 11 | "Gabiru Is Here!"; Transliteration: "Gabiru Sanjō!" (Japanese: ガビル参上！) | Yoshifumi Sasahara | Taizo Yoshida | Takashi Mamezuka | December 11, 2018 |
It has been a few days since Benimaru and other kijins joined Rimuru. Gabiru arrives at Rimuru's village to try and get everyone to serve under him to fight the orcs. Gobta is sent in to duel against Gabiru, defeating him quickly with the skills he's learned and forcing the lizardmen to retreat. Later, Rimuru is approached by a dryad named Treyni, who asks him to defeat the Orc Lord.
| 12 | 12 | "The Gears Spin Out of Control"; Transliteration: "Kuruiyuku Haguruma" (Japanese: 狂いゆく歯車) | Yoshihiro Mori | Munenori Nawa | Takashi Mamezuka & Kenichirō Katsura | December 18, 2018 |
Treyni explains that the Orc Lord has used a unique skill "Starved" on the Orcs, causing them to constantly crave sustenance, go berserk, and even eat their own to gain more power. Accepting Treyni's request, Rimuru sends Souei to negotiate with the lizardmen for an alliance. As the chieftain urges his soldiers not to engage in battle with the orcs until Rimuru's group arrives, Gabiru, swayed by the words of Gelmud's messenger Laplace, usurps the chieftain's position and leads the lizardmen into a direct attack on the orcs, unaware of the Orc Lord's true power.
| 13 | 13 | "The Great Clash"; Transliteration: "Dai Gekitotsu" (Japanese: 大激突) | Atsushi Nakayama | Shinji Itadaki | Kenichirō Katsura | December 25, 2018 |
Rimuru's group comes across Gabiru's sister, who informs them of Gabiru's coup d'etat and asks them to rescue the chieftain and save the lizardmen. Meanwhile, Gabiru and his troop find themselves cornered after the orcs eat one of the soldiers and gain their powers. As Treyni discovers Gelmud and Laplace and forces them to leave the forest with the help of a light spirit, Gabiru struggles against the Orc General, but is rescued by the arrival of Rimuru's group. The gang defeats the general and most of the orc army while Souei rescues the chieftain, after which Rimuru goes to confront Geld the Orc Lord.
| 14 | 14 | "The One Who Devours All"; Transliteration: "Subete o Kurau Mono" (Japanese: 全てを喰らう者) | Yasuhiro Ito | Masashi Kojima | Takashi Mamezuka | January 8, 2019 |
Gelmud suddenly appears, revealing he created the Orc Lord in order to turn him into a new Demon Lord. After failing to beat Rimuru, Gelmud is killed and devoured by Geld, who evolves into the Demon Lord Orc Disaster, which proves too powerful for the kijins to defeat. Realizing Geld's power, Rimuru has Great Sage take control of his body in order to fight against him, but after Geld develops fire resistance, Rimuru resumes control and engages in a battle with Geld to see who can consume the other first. Learning that Geld was on a search to end the famine afflicting his people before he was manipulated by Gelmud, Rimuru devours his sins along with his body. Afterward, as the orcs are freed from Starved's effects, the kijins decide to continue serving under Rimuru.
| 15 | 15 | "The Jura Forest Alliance"; Transliteration: "Jura no Mori Dai Dōmei" (Japanese: ジュラの森大同盟) | Akira Yamada | Katsumi Terahigashi | Junichi Takaoka | January 15, 2019 |
Rimuru forms the Jura Forest Alliance to allow the lizardmen, goblins, and orcs to live together in harmony, inadvertently ending up as the alliance's chancellor. Rimuru bestows the name of Geld onto the Orc Lord's son, evolving him into the Orc King and the other orcs into High Orcs. Then, he gives the lizardmen chieftain the name Abiru. Later, Gabiru is excommunicated and exiled from the lizardmen for his actions and embarks on a journey. Laplace informs his boss Clayman, the mastermind behind the Orc army, of the Orc Lord's defeat, leading Clayman to grow curious about Rimuru. Three months later, Dwarf King Gazel learns of Rimuru's actions and the Orc Lord's defeat. He and his army travel to the Goblin Village to challenge Rimuru to a duel and determine his true nature. After Rimuru succeeds in blocking all of his strikes, and upon learning the two share the same swordmaster (Hakurou), Gazel accepts he is not evil and offers a treaty between their groups. The Jura Tempest Federation is formed and recognized as an official nation.
| 16 | 16 | "Demon Lord Milim Attacks"; Transliteration: "Maō Mirimu Raishū" (Japanese: 魔王ミリム来襲) | Munenori Nawa | Yasuhito Kikuchi & Masashi Kojima | Kenichirō Katsura | January 22, 2019 |
Two days after forming an alliance with Rimuru, Gazel visits again, bringing Vesta, who apologizes to Rimuru and Kaijin for the trouble he caused in the past and begins to work for them as a researcher. Gabiru and his sister, along with several other lizardmen, also become Rimuru's servants, evolving into dragonewts after Rimuru names them; this causes them to grow wings while the females are given a more human-like appearance. Sometime later, four Demon Lords: Milim Nava, Clayman, Frey, and Carrion, learn about Rimuru and the Orc Lord's defeat. Milim takes an interest in the Jura Forest and goes there to see Rimuru. Fearing for their master's safety, Ranga and the kijins appear to defend Rimuru, but can do little against her overwhelming power. In the end, Rimuru calms Milim down by putting some honey into her mouth and the two become friends, with Milim deciding to live in the village with him. Despite being relieved that she will not attack them anymore, Rimuru's council gets concerned with Milim and Rimuru's new friendship, as the other Demon Lords can view it as a threat to their own balance of power.
| 17 | 17 | "The Gathering"; Transliteration: "Tsudōsha-tachi" (Japanese: 集う者達) | Shin Tosaka | Masashi Kojima | Junichi Takaoka | January 29, 2019 |
Vesta succeeds in developing a full potion to equal Rimuru's potions, prompting Rimuru to attempt negotiations to develop low potions in the city. Just then, Phobio, beastkeeper of the Demon Lord Carrion, comes to Tempest with the intent of taking it over but is promptly dealt with by Milim before Rimuru resolves things peacefully, offering Milim a new weapon in exchange for information. Later, the Border Survey Corps led by a man named Youm, joined Eren's party, and come to Tempest, where Rimuru asks them to take credit for defeating the Orc Lord. Meanwhile, Clayman takes an interest in a powerful beast known as Charybdis and sends Tear the harlequin, one of his allies, to investigate.
| 18 | 18 | "Evil Creeps Closer"; Transliteration: "Shinobiyoru Akui" (Japanese: 忍び寄る悪意) | Yoshihiro Mori | Masashi Kojima & Yasuhito Kikuchi | Kenichirō Katsura | February 5, 2019 |
While Phobio fumes over his humiliation at Milim's hands, Tear and Footman, two of Clayman's harlequins, approach and convinces him to become a Demon Lord himself so he can get revenge on Milim. All he must do is let Charybdis possess his body and maintain control. Phobio breaks the seal on Charybdis. Tear reveals she was under orders to revive Charybdis and send it Milim's way. Treyni's sister, Trya, warns Rimuru of the revival. Born from a cloud of Vledora's magicules, Charybdis is the mindless ruler of the skies, focused only on destruction. It has summoned thirteen megalodon from the Spirit World to aid in its rampage and is heading to Jura. Rimuru and the Dwargon Empire prepare for battle.
| 19 | 19 | "Charybdis"; Transliteration: "Karyubudisu" (Japanese: 暴風大妖渦(カリュブディス)) | Atsushi Nakayama | Yasuhito Kikuchi & Risako Yoshida | Takashi Mamezuka | February 12, 2019 |
Assisted by 100 Pegasus Knights from Dwargon, Rimuru's forces destroy the megalodons and attempt to destroy Charybdis with a full-scale attack, but fail. Rimuru then battles Charybdis himself, only to discover it is possessing Phobio, and its true target is Milim, who was kept out of the battle earlier. By Rimuru's request, Milim defeats Charybdis while sparing Phobio's life. After the battle, Phobio apologizes for all the trouble he caused, and his master, Demon Lord Carrion, establishes a non-aggression pact with Tempest. Rimuru and the others finally discover that all the troubles they had faced recently were caused by Clayman's harlequin gang: the Moderate Harlequin Alliance.
| 20 | 20 | "Yuuki Kagurazaka" (Japanese: ユウキ・カグラザカ) | Tokugane Tanizawa | Masashi Kojima | Junichi Takaoka | February 19, 2019 |
The city celebrates its victory with a filleted megalodon. Milim later leaves during the celebration. That night, Rimuru has a dream about Shizu's regret over not being able to help her students; five children brought into this world. Rimuru goes to the Kingdom of Ingrassia with Ranga to see them. There, he meets Yuuki Kagurazaka, the grandmaster in charge of the children, a teenager himself. Yuuki arranges for Rimuru to teach Shizu's students but warns him that while the two of them are Otherworlders who came here, the children are Summons meant to be weapons for the Summoner. They have so much energy in their young bodies that it will kill them within five years. Rimuru vows to honor Shizu's wish and find a way to save them. Rimuru states that it has been two years since he was reincarnated in this world; thus putting Milim's arrival at least a year after the Orc Lord incident.
| 21 | 21 | "Shizu-san's Students"; Transliteration: "Shizu-san no Oshiego-tachi" (Japanese: シズさんの教え子達) | Ōri Yasukawa | Katsumi Terahigashi | Takashi Mamezuka | February 26, 2019 |
Shizu's students don't show Rimuru much respect so he decides to show them the difference in their skills in a series of duels. Kenya uses fire magic, Chloe uses water magic, Gale fires magic bullets, Ryota uses body enhancements, and Alice uses puppetry to control toys to attack him. They lose and accept him as their sensei. Rimuru visits Treyni, believing the children will survive if inhabited by superior spirits since Shizu was Summoned as a child but lived to adulthood, possibly because of Ifrit. Treyni directs him to the Dwelling of Spirits, but with the Queen of Spirits the dryads once served dead, they have lost their link to it and no longer know the entrance. While on a picnic with the students, they see a Sky Dragon heading to the capital and Rimuru interferes and eats it with Gluttony. Mjolmire, a merchant whose Rimuru's appearance is saved, invites them to dinner. Mjolmire knows who Rimuru is and Rimuru invites him to come to Tempest to help them sell their wares. He agrees. Mjolmire's assistant asks the Queen of Spirits to protect the children after dinner. She tells a curious Rimuru she came from a village near the Dwelling of Spirits. He, Ranga, and the children head to its location.
| 22 | 22 | "Conquering the Labyrinth"; Transliteration: "Meikyū kōryaku" (Japanese: 迷宮攻略) | Shige Fukase | Shinji Itadaki | Hideki Sakai | March 5, 2019 |
Rimuru, Ranga, and the students enter the Dwelling of Spirits and a spirit in the opening labyrinth battles them with a giant metal golem to test them, though Rimuru quickly incinerated it. The labyrinth spirit introduces herself as Ramiris, one of the ten Demon Lords, though she's so small no one believes her. She explains that Leon, who summoned Shizu, used to be a Hero before he fell from grace and become a Demon Lord. Likewise, she used to be the Queen of Spirits before dying and returning as a Demon Lord. In exchange for creating a new golem for her, Ramiris agrees to aid Rimuru in summoning superior spirits.
| 23 | 23 | "Saved Souls"; Transliteration: "Sukuwareru tamashii" (Japanese: 救われる魂) | Shin Tosaka | Masashi Kojima | Junichi Takaoka | March 12, 2019 |
A plethora of inferior spirits answer the prayers of Gale, Alice, and Ryota so Rimuru devours them and turns them into three new superior spirits, which successfully inhabit the three. Kenya summons and is inhabited by a superior spirit of light. When an unknown spirit-like being appears, Veldora reacts to its presence. Despite Ramiris's attempt to stop it, as she feels it is dangerous, it still possesses Chloe. Regardless, the dangerous energy in the five children has calmed, so they will not die in a few years. Rimuru makes a new golem for Ramiris and they return to Ingrassia. Yuuki finds it unlikely the nations that abandoned the children will try to take them back so they should be able to live normal lives. Rimuru doesn't tell Yuuki how he saved them. Rimuru thinks about the past two years and declares all their problems have been solved. He gives Chloe Shizu's magicule-suppressing mask but isn't certain why, simply feeling it was for the best. Unknown to Rimuru, a shady woman is spying on him.
| 24 | 24 | "Black and a Mask"; Transliteration: "Gaiden: Kuro to Kamen" (Japanese: 外伝：黒と仮面) | Munenori Nawa | Shinji Itadaki | Ryōma Ebata | March 19, 2019 |
A dying woman summons a demon to avenge her and her partner and the demon agrees to her request, deciding it would be an amusing distraction. Shizu's memory: Shizu is summoned to the Kingdom of Filtwood with other adventurers to stop a demon from taking its remains under the castle and reviving it. Upon hearing the Silver Wings, a pair of famous adventurers, were killed by the nameless demon, some try to withdraw. The minister refuses to let them leave, revealing some are possessed by demons, which causes paranoia among the group. One of the crowd, the demon from before, starts laughing, claiming the knights summoned the lesser demons but does not explain. Hired to kill a demon, he reveals he intends to kill all the other adventurers present to find the responsible party. Shizu refuses to let that happen and duels with the being, who calls himself "Kuro." One of his blows is reflected by Shizu's mask and takes off his arm. He decides to withdraw, saying the fight was amusing because Shizu was able to hurt him. Afterward, Shizu recalls how Leon told her the most powerful demons were the progenitors, known by colors like Rouge (red) and Noir (black). One of the knights summons her to the king and takes her to the castle. It is revealed the king and minister were puppets of the same demon she was hired to stop, who has taken on the persona of Orthos, the hero who previously defeated him, thus gaining the name Orthos and becoming an archdemon. They intend to sacrifice the adventurers and Shizu, who is still worn out from her fight, to regain his full strength. Orthos is able to defeat her but Kuro timely appears and kills the king and minister. He reveals he was summoned by the dying Silver Wings to avenge them and kept his promises. He scolds Orthos for being overconfident despite being dependent on Rouge and destroys his soul. Officially, the king and minister were killed by Kuro, who Shizu then defeated. As long as they keep their stories straight, Kuro says he has no reason to target Shizu before leaving. In the post-credits, Kuro observes Rimuru through a scrying glass and declares that next time Rimuru will lead him "to the truth of this world."

== Recap special ==
| No. overall | No. in season | Title | Directed by (Note: Production staff information is taken from the ending credits of each recap special) | Original release date |
|---|---|---|---|---|
| 24.5 | 24.5 | "Tales: Veldora's Journal"; Transliteration: "Kanwa: Verudora Nikki" (Japanese: 閑話：ヴェルドラ日記) | Atsushi Nakayama | March 26, 2019 |
Ifrit, who has been trapped in Rimuru due to the latter's Predator skill, recaps events of the season while in a discussion with Veldora as they play Shogi.

== International broadcast ==
The series is available with multilingual subtitles on iQIYI in South East Asia. Also available on JioCinema for Indian subcontinent.
