= That Time I Got Reincarnated as a Slime the Movie: Scarlet Bond =

2022 Japanese animated film by Yasuhito Kikuchi

- Theatrical release poster
- Kanji: 劇場版 転生したらスライムだった件 紅蓮の絆編
- Revised Hepburn: Gekijō-ban Tensei Shitara Suraimu Datta Ken: Guren no Kizuna-hen
- Directed by: Yasuhito Kikuchi
- Screenplay by: Kazuyuki Fudeyasu
- Story by: Fuse
- Based on: That Time I Got Reincarnated as a Slime by Fuse
- Produced by: Nobuaki Sugimoto; Yoshiyuki Shiotani
- Starring: Miho Okasaki; Yuma Uchida; Riko Fukumoto; Makoto Furukawa; Megumi Toyoguchi; Tomoaki Maeno; Sayaka Senbongi; M・A・O; Takuya Eguchi; Hōchū Ōtsuka; Junichi Yanagita; Kanehira Yamamoto; Asuna Tomari; Chikahiro Kobayashi; Taro Yamaguchi; Jun Fukushima; Takahiro Sakurai; Subaru Kimura
- Cinematography: Hiroshi Satō
- Edited by: Yumi Jinguji
- Music by: Hitoshi Fujima
- Production company: Eight Bit
- Distributed by: Bandai Namco Filmworks
- Release dates: November 9, 2022 (Tokyo); November 25, 2022 (Japan)
- Running time: 108 minutes
- Country: Japan
- Language: Japanese
- Box office: ¥1.5 billion (Japan); $14.7 million (worldwide)

That Time I Got Reincarnated as a Slime the Movie: Scarlet Bond, (Note: Japanese: 劇場版 転生したらスライムだった件 紅蓮の絆編, Hepburn: Gekijō-ban Tensei Shitara Suraimu Datta Ken: Guren no Kizuna-hen) often shortened to Tensura the Movie: Scarlet Bond, (Note: Japanese: 劇場版 転スラ 紅蓮の絆編, Hepburn: Gekijō-ban Tensura: Guren no Kizuna-hen) is a 2022 Japanese animated isekai fantasy film based on the light novel series That Time I Got Reincarnated as a Slime by Fuse. Produced by Eight Bit and distributed by Bandai Namco Filmworks, the film is directed by Yasuhito Kikuchi from a script written by Kazuyuki Fudeyasu, who adapted an original story drafted by Fuse. Set after the second season of the anime television series adaptation, the film follows Hiiro, another surviving member of the Ogre Village, and Towa, the queen of a small country located west of the Jura Tempest Federation.

Talks for an anime film version of the light novel series began in 2019, with Fuse being asked to write a draft in early 2020. Production began in late 2020, and the film was revealed to the public in September 2021. The cast reprising their roles for the film were announced in March 2022, with Yuma Uchida, Riko Fukumoto, and Subaru Kimura joining them in August to voice the original characters. That month, the staff involved in the production were revealed.

That Time I Got Reincarnated as a Slime the Movie: Scarlet Bond premiered in Tokyo on November 9, 2022, and was released in Japan on November 25. The film received mixed reviews, with critics praising one of the original characters (Hiiro) and visuals while criticizing how the character Rimuru Tempest was written. It grossed over ¥1.5 billion in Japan.

== Plot ==
Following their desertion from Clayman's army, an Ogre and his fellow mercenaries are attacked by Clayman's soldiers, whose leader Yamza severely injures the Ogre. He is found by the people of the Kingdom of Raja and is given the name "Hiiro" by its queen Towa to recover from his injuries. Ten days later, Hiiro escapes Raja to return to the Ogre Village, only to find it destroyed by the Orcs. Wanting vengeance against the Orcs, Hiiro returns to Raja four days later and swears loyalty to Towa.

Rimuru, who recently defeated Clayman and has been recognized by other Demon Lords as one of their own, is informed by Souei of an attack toward Geld and his fellow Orcs. The Orcs are fighting against Hiiro and his two Raja subordinates, during which Geld learns that Hiiro seeks revenge against his race, so he drops his weapons and accepts his fate of being killed by him. However, Benimaru saves Geld and pacifies Hiiro, who actually is his childhood friend. Hiiro reunites with Benimaru, Shion, Shuna, Hakuro, Souei, and Kurobe, and reconciles with Geld after learning that the Orcs are no longer their enemies and that the one manipulating them is long dead. During a feast hosted by Rimuru, Hiiro reveals that he had arrived at the Jura Tempest Federation as Raja's messenger to ask permission to cultivate a part of the Great Jura Forest to serve as a food source for the kingdom. He informs that Towa is suffering from Curse Poison, the effect of using the power of her tiara to purify a lake filled with toxins from the country's gold mines. Milim Nava then joins in on the meeting, unhappy that she wasn't invited. Agreeing to help, Rimuru decides to visit the kingdom.

Rimuru, Benimaru, Shion, Shuna, and Ranga arrive at Raja. After analyzing her condition, Rimuru gives Towa honey from Tempest to restore part of her health. At the lake, Rimuru reveals to Towa that the toxins are not from mines, as he then splits the lake into two to reveal a hidden structure with an old magic circle that produces the toxin and destroys it. These events have angered Lacua, the merchant behind the poisoning, and schemes to create another disaster to earn praise from the Primordial Demon Violet. The lake is poisoned again, so Towa uses her tiara to purify it, resulting in her health deteriorating. A neighboring country takes advantage of her worsening condition to attack Raja and seize the gold that the kingdom mined. Having learned of the news about the encroaching enemy, Rimuru mobilizes his allies, while Diablo heads out to meet with Violet, who created the tiara and the magic circle at the lake.

Hiiro is tricked by Lacua to ingest a Curse Orb, being told that it is for transferring Towa's soul to his healthy body, and is fed by him with memories of his village being destroyed to fuel his transformation. Rimuru chases after Lacua, while Benimaru fights Hiiro and Shuna protects Towa. Meanwhile, Diablo confronts Violet, who reveals that she had given the tiara to a previous queen of Raja as part of a game with Raja's royal line in which if the possessor is fully inflicted by the Curse Poison, then she can take over the body and be physically reborn. After failing to defeat him, Violet agrees to Diablo's terms of leaving Raja alone while also voiding the contract with Towa and her line after learning that Lacua interfered with her game against her wishes instead of observing only. She cuts ties with Lacua for ruining her fun. Chikuan, Towa's doctor, is revealed to be in allegiance with Lacua, but he is killed by Ranga. Rimuru eventually defeats Lacua, who blows himself up to destroy everything around him. However, the explosion is contained by Rimuru. Hiiro removes the orb from his body and destroys it.

Towa uses the full power of the tiara to revive Hiiro from the Curse Orb, causing her body to be covered by the Curse Poison and vanish. However, Violet revives Towa after voiding the game as an apology for her subordinate's actions. While celebrating, Rimuru offers the kingdom's ministers help in rebuilding Raja in exchange for Tempest buying their iron ore. Rimuru returns to Tempest, finds it partially destroyed after Veldora and Milim played together, and punishes them before collapsing from exhaustion.

== Voice cast ==
Character	Japanese	English
Rimuru	Miho Okasaki	Brittney Karbowski
Hiiro	Yuma Uchida	Jonah Scott
Towa	Riko Fukumoto	Cherami Leigh
Benimaru	Makoto Furukawa Makoto Koichi (young)	Ricco Fajardo Emily Fajardo (young)
Violet	Miyu Tomita	Cristina Vee
Lacua	Subaru Kimura	Tony Oliver
Raphael	Megumi Toyoguchi	Mallorie Rodak
Veldora	Tomoaki Maeno	Chris Rager
Shuna	Sayaka Senbongi	Tia Ballard
Shion	M・A・O	Michelle Rojas
Souei	Takuya Eguchi	Ian Sinclair
Hakuro	Hōchū Ōtsuka	Charlie Campbell
Kurobe	Junichi Yanagita	Eric Vale
Ranga	Chikahiro Kobayashi	Tyson Rinehart
Rigurd	Kanehira Yamamoto	Kent Williams
Rigur	Haruki Ishiya	Derick Snow
Gobta	Asuna Tomari	Ryan Reynolds
Geld	Taro Yamaguchi	Cris George
Gabil	Jun Fukushima	Austin Tindle
Soka	Rumi Okubo	Caitlin Glass
Yashichi	Akinori Egoshi	Ricco Fajardo
Kakushin	Hiromichi Tezuka	Patric Carroll
Sukero	Yoshihito Sasaki	Garret Storms
Diablo	Takahiro Sakurai	Daman Mills
Milim	Rina Hidaka	Kristen McGuire
Frey	Sayaka Ohara	Lisa Ortiz
Ramiris	Anzu Haruno	Jad Saxton
Treyni	Rie Tanaka	Jamie Marchi
Mobuji	Mitsuru Ogata	Mark Stoddard
Minister	Uoken	Sean Hennigan
Fuji	Sekai	Ben Balmaceda
Kikyo	Kurumi Karikawa	Sara Ragsdale
Miner A	Hiroki Nunokawa	Aaron Roberts
Miner B	Michio	Jordan Woollen
First queen	Risa Ozaki	Luci Christian
Chikuan	Shinpachi Tsuji	Greg Dulcie
Yamza	Yūya Hirose	Bryson Baugus
Violet's chef	Yoshiki Nakajima	Aaron Roberts
Violet's butler	Mugihito	John Gremillion

== Production ==
Initial talks for an anime film version of the light novel series That Time I Got Reincarnated as a Slime began in the second half of 2019. Light novel series author Fuse was informed about this project during the premiere of the third original animation DVD (OAD) of the anime television series on January 26, 2020. He was initially opposed to the idea of continuing the story that was seen in the second season with a film and then the latter would be followed by a third season, believing that there "would be a missing link in the TV series", and had shown hesitation in making an original story that would not connect to the main one. Bandai Namco Filmworks producer Nobuaki Sugimoto stated that the film based on an original story would help in attracting new fans to continue the series itself, while he affirmed that the main story would remain in a television format. Fuse was formally asked to write a draft for the film in early 2020. The first draft that he submitted was rejected in September 2020 because it was "not really suitable for a film". Fuse then wrote the key lines in two days and submitted it as the plot instead of writing the draft as a novel which a script could be based on because he had no time due to the deadline being set to December 2020. Production on the film began by the end of that year.

The official Twitter account of the anime series announced the film to the public in September 2021. The title of the film was revealed in March 2022 as Gekijōban Tensei Shitara Suraimu Datta Ken: Guren no Kizuna-hen (劇場版 転生したらスライムだった件 紅蓮の絆編). (Note: The English translations of the subtitle Guren no Kizuna-hen (紅蓮の絆編) were first reported as Scarlet Bonds by Anime News Network and Blazing Bonds Arc by Crunchyroll.) The film was also confirmed to be based on an original story drafted by Fuse, which features the character Benimaru's older brother named Hiiro, and a new small country ruled by an unnamed queen and located west of Jura Tempest Federation called Raja (ラージャ). That month, Eight Bit and Bandai Namco Arts were announced to be producing and distributing the film, respectively, while Miho Okasaki, Makoto Furukawa, Megumi Toyoguchi, Tomoaki Maeno, Sayaka Senbongi, M・A・O, Takuya Eguchi, Hōchū Ōtsuka, Junichi Yanagita, Kanehira Yamamoto, Asuna Tomari, Chikahiro Kobayashi, Taro Yamaguchi, Jun Fukushima, and Takahiro Sakurai were set to reprise their roles from the anime series. In June 2022, Crunchyroll licensed the film under the title That Time I Got Reincarnated as a Slime the Movie: Scarlet Bond.

The name of the queen of Raja was revealed in July 2022 as Towa (トワ). In August 2022, Riko Fukumoto joined the cast as Towa, as did Yuma Uchida as Hiiro and Subaru Kimura as Lacua, a peddler who frequently visits Raja. Additionally, the staff working on the film were also announced, including Yasuhito Kikuchi as the director, Kazuyuki Fudeyasu as the screenwriter, Ryōma Ebata as the character designer, Takahiro Kishida as the monster designer, Yūichi Tanaka as the chief animation director, Ayumi Satō as the art director, Yumi Jinguji as the editor, and Hiroshi Satō as the cinematographer, with Bandai Namco Filmworks attached as the distributor. In October 2022, Sekai Yamamoto of the J-pop male group Fantastics from Exile Tribe, in his first voice acting, and the Japanese comedy duo Tom Brown (Hiroki Nunokawa and Michio) were confirmed to be making guest appearances as Fuji, Hiiro's subordinate and assistant, and the Raja miners, respectively. By December 2022, Miyu Tomita was confirmed to be voicing Violet. That month, Crunchyroll revealed Jonah Scott as the English dub for Hiiro.

== Music ==
In August 2022, Hitoshi Fujima was announced to be composing That Time I Got Reincarnated as a Slime the Movie: Scarlet Bond. In September 2022, MindaRyn was announced to be performing the theme song of the film titled "Make Me Feel Better", while True and Stereo Dive Foundation were also announced to be performing the insert songs "Jōka" (浄歌; lit. 'Purifying Song' or 'A Sacred Song') and "Sparkles", respectively. The album Eternal Bond (永遠の絆, Eien no Kizuna), which includes the three songs, and the original soundtrack album, titled Tensei Shitara Eiga no Sound Track Datta Ken (転生したら映画の音楽だった件), were released in Japan on November 25, 2022.

Tensei Shitara Eiga no Sound Track Datta Ken [Disc 1]
No.	Title	Length
1.	"Majin"	1:40
2.	"Kesshi"	1:36
3.	"Nazuke"	1:38
4.	"Mōshin"	1:44
5.	"Gakuzen"	1:25
6.	"Heigei"	1:14
7.	"Kyūhen"	2:08
8.	"Yūigi"	7:04
9.	"Gyakushū"	2:00
10.	"Isshin'Ittai"	9:09
11.	"Kōi"	1:35
12.	"Osananajimi"	1:36
13.	"Zannin"	1:40
14.	"Rakushō"	1:34
15.	"Shinrai"	1:48
16.	"Kesshin"	1:42
17.	"Taiji"	1:32
18.	"Fushigi"	1:22
19.	"Tiara"	3:07
20.	"Bōryaku"	1:51
21.	"Yūsei"	2:02
22.	"Han'ei"	1:26
Total length:		50:53

Tensei Shitara Eiga no Sound Track Datta Ken [Disc 2]
No.	Title	Length
1.	"Shūshō"	1:52
2.	"Naimitsu"	1:39
3.	"Yūjō"	2:18
4.	"Sakusen Kaigi"	1:37
5.	"Wakare"	1:49
6.	"An'yaku"	1:46
7.	"Gunbatsu"	1:29
8.	"Kettō"	2:07
9.	"Shinkoku"	1:36
10.	"Kodoku"	1:38
11.	"Honshō"	4:22
12.	"Tōki"	2:17
13.	"Nazo"	1:25
14.	"Kimagure"	2:21
15.	"Sōgi"	2:28
16.	"Keiyaku"	1:43
17.	"Kōgeki"	2:35
18.	"Honō"	1:56
19.	"Funki"	2:23
20.	"Tsūkoku"	1:14
21.	"Sōtō"	2:06
22.	"Kore Kara"	2:12
23.	"Maō"	1:22
Total length:		46:15

== Marketing ==
The teaser key visual for That Time I Got Reincarnated as a Slime the Movie: Scarlet Bond was released in September 2021. The second key visual and the first trailer for the film were released in March 2022. That month, Akinori Egoshi, who voices Gabil's subordinate Yashichi, participated in the 2021 Tokyo Marathon to promote the release of the film. The third key visual was unveiled in July 2022. A marketing campaign for the film, titled "Challenge Everyone! Make Rimuru-sama the Best in Japan!" (みんなでチャレンジ！リムルさまを日本一に！), was launched in August 2022, in which participants could win prizes by completing certain missions on a dedicated website to elevate the character Rimuru's position in reaching the highest point in Japan (Mount Fuji).

The main trailer for the film, which features the theme song, was released in early November 2022. Three special programs for the film were aired on Nippon TV stations: the first program hosted by the Japanese comedy duo Magical Lovely on November 18, 2022; the second program in collaboration with the Japanese documentary variety show World Great TV on November 19; and the third program featuring the first 6 minutes and 30 seconds of the film on November 26. A prequel manga illustrated by Taiki Kawakami, titled That Time I Got Reincarnated as a Slime the Movie: Scarlet Bond 0 (劇場版 転生したらスライムだった件 紅蓮の絆編 0, Gekijōban Tensei Shitara Suraimu Datta Ken: Guren no Kizuna-hen 0), was given as a gift to the first 800,000 filmgoers during the first week of the film's theatrical run. A special leaflet, titled Interview with Violet (インタビュー・ウィズ・ヴィオレ), was given as a gift during the fifth week of the film's theatrical run. It contains a short story written by Fuse which features the back side of the film in Violet's point of view.

Promotional partners for the film included condiment maker Riken Vitamin, professional football club Tokyo Verdy, the store Funtos via a collaboration cafe, Frito-Lay via their Dragon Potato snack, Daiichi Kosho Company via their karaoke brand DAM and karaoke box chain Big Echo, and Liv Heart via their Nemu Nemu Animals product.

== Release ==
=== Theatrical ===
That Time I Got Reincarnated as a Slime the Movie: Scarlet Bond had its world premiere in Tokyo on November 9, 2022, and was released in Japan on November 25. A barrier-free screening of the film, which included an audio description for the blind and visually impaired filmgoers and closed captioning with Japanese subtitles for the deaf and hard of hearing filmgoers, began on December 16, 2022. The film ended its theatrical run on February 19, 2023.

Crunchyroll screened the film in the United Kingdom and Ireland on January 18, 2023, in Australia on January 19, and in the United States and Canada on January 20.

=== Home media ===
The limited-time transactional video on demand (TVOD) for That Time I Got Reincarnated as a Slime the Movie: Scarlet Bond in Japan began from March 24, 2023, to June 30, while its electronic sell-through began on May 1. The film was released on Blu-ray and DVD in Japan on July 28, 2023, as well as its actual TVOD. The features of the Blu-ray's special limited edition include a special booklet and two unreleased scenes from the film ("Interlude: Kurobe's Blacksmith Workshop" (幕間：クロベエの鍛冶工房) and "Interlude: Gabil and Wyvern" (幕間：ガビルとワイバーン)). The film began streaming on Netflix in Japan on November 25, 2023. Animax aired the film on December 3, 2023.

Muse Asia released the film on over-the-top media services in Southeast Asia on March 23, 2023. Crunchyroll added the film for streaming in North America, Central America, South America, Europe, Africa, Oceania, the Middle East, and the Commonwealth of Independent States on April 20, 2023, and released it on Blu-ray in North America on September 17, 2024. They released it on Blu-ray and DVD in the United Kingdom on October 14, 2024.

== Reception ==
=== Box office ===
That Time I Got Reincarnated as a Slime the Movie: Scarlet Bond grossed over ¥1.5 billion (US$11.4 million) in Japan, becoming the tenth highest-grossing anime film of 2022 in the country. The film had a worldwide box office gross of $14.7 million.

The film grossed ¥416 million (US$3.2 million) in its opening weekend in Japan, debuting at second place in the box office behind Suzume (2022). It reached the 500-million-yen box office gross in six days since its release. The film earned ¥154.6 million (US$1.2 million) in its second weekend, dropping its ranking to fourth place, and ¥120 million (US$915,738) in its third weekend. In 24 days since its release, the film reached the one-billion-yen box office gross, becoming the thirteenth Japanese animated film of 2022 to do so. An additional ¥74 million (US$564,185) had been earned by the film in its fourth weekend, ¥40 million (US$304,890) in fifth weekend, and ¥24 million (US$184,008) in sixth weekend. Over one million tickets were reported to have been sold on the 46th day of the film's theatrical run, bringing its total box office at that time to ¥1.3 billion (US$10.1 million).

Outside Japan, the film earned £62,612 (US$77,639), including £27,291 (US$33,841) from its previews, in its opening weekend in the United Kingdom and Ireland. In the United States and Canada, Deadline Hollywood reported the film had earned US$697,700 from 1,468 theaters on its opening day, including the earnings from Thursday previews, and had an opening-weekend box office gross of US$1.46 million.

=== Critical response ===
The review aggregator website Rotten Tomatoes reported an approval rating of 53% with an average rating of 5.8/10, based on 15 reviews. On Metacritic, That Time I Got Reincarnated as a Slime the Movie: Scarlet Bond has a weighted average score of 41 out of 100, based on 5 critics, indicating "mixed or average reviews". Audiences polled by PostTrak reported 77% of audience members gave the film a positive score, with 58% saying they would definitely recommend it.

Demelza of Anime UK News gave the film a score of 7 out of 10, feeling that it was "a fun installment of the series, but it's not without issues and certainly isn't something you can enjoy without having kept up to date with the TV series. It's an interesting story that's held back by being divorced from the canon material and unable to leave any lasting effects." She lauded the well-written stories of Hiiro and Towa, the animation done by Eight Bit which she felt was "just as good as its TV counterparts", the well-fit new music compositions, and the "energetic" theme song. However, she criticized how Rimuru was written in the film, feeling that the character was "far more powerful than anyone else in this story and that overshadows the struggles Hiiro faces" and wishing he "had stayed behind in Tempest and just sent the group of Ogres by themselves, which would have made for more compelling drama in the end." Richard Eisenbeis at Anime News Network graded the film "C+", feeling that it was "above average as far as original, tie-in anime films go. There were apparent attempts to connect the movie in a meaningful way to both the past and future of the story, and the film's newly created lead, Hiiro, is a character worth exploring. But other than that, everything about the film is forgettable, from the villains and the one-off heroine to the plot and setting." Eisenbeis praised the film for depicting a "justifiable" motives of Hiiro, its visual that he felt was "a step up from the TV series", and the theme song. However, he criticized how Rimuru was utilized in the film, feeling that the character was "so powerful he gets in the way of the story the film wants to tell", and the music for being "forgettable". Phil Hoad of The Guardian gave the film 3 out of 5 stars, feeling that it was similar to "having the contents of a Dungeons & Dragons manual screamed at you by your 12-year-old nephew after a Haribo binge – but it's kind of fun trying to keep up." Hoad felt that the film being in medias res was "not helpful", but he noted it had "crunchily animated brawls every five minutes and a playful embrace of sword'n'sorcery hokum that gives it a little lift" and found a "po-faced mope of a lead" in Hiiro.

Wendy Ide of The Observer gave the film 2 out of 5 stars, believing that familiarity with the previous adaptations of the source material was needed to understand the work. Ide felt the film was "visually striking, and at times somewhat overwhelming." Richard Whittaker at The Austin Chronicle also gave the film 2 out of 5 stars, feeling that it "collapses into the hourlong, supposedly epic but ultimately low-stakes multifront battle de rigueur in too much anime right now." Whittaker also felt that the film was not accessible to first-time viewers and would not make long-term fans satisfy. He criticized the "clumsy" comedy, "airless" script about Towa's poisoning, and cramming of cameos for every background characters, believing the film "might have been better as a season." Simon Abrams of TheWrap felt the film was "underwhelming because its creators don't seem to know how to translate their show's ever-mutating high-concept appeal into a feature-length movie." Abrams also felt the film did not compare well with the light novel, noted how Rimuru was written as a secondary role in his film, and found the characters Hiiro and Towa were not meshing well with the recurring characters.
