= That Time I Got Reincarnated as a Slime season 3 =

That Time I Got Reincarnated as a Slime
- Season 3
- Third season key visual
- No. of episodes: 24

Release
- Original network: NNS (Nippon TV), BS11
- Original release: April 5 – September 27, 2024

Season chronology
- ← Previous; Season 2 Next → Season 4

That Time I Got Reincarnated as a Slime is an anime television series based on the light novel series of the same title written by Fuse and illustrated by Mitz Vah. The anime is produced by Eight Bit. The series follows a man who is killed and reincarnated in another world as a slime named Rimuru. The third season was announced in November 2022 with the cast members each reprising their roles, and aired from April 5 to September 27, 2024, on the Friday Anime Night programming block on Nippon Television and its affiliates, as well as BS11. The staff from the second season and the Visions of Coleus ONA series are returning to reprise their production roles.

The first opening theme song is "Peacekeeper" performed by Stereo Dive Foundation, while the ending theme song is "Believer" performed by Rin Kurusu. The second opening theme song is "Renacer Serenade" (レナセールセレナーデ) performed by Momoiro Clover Z, while the second ending theme song is "Miracle Soup" performed by MindaRyn.

Following the airing of the season's final episode, a fourth season was announced, along with a second film, which is scheduled to be released on February 27, 2026, while the fourth season will be released on April 3, 2026.

== Episodes ==
No. overall	No. in season	Title	Directed by (Note: Production staff information is taken from the ending credits of each episode)	Written by	Storyboarded by	Original release date
49	1	"Demons and Strategies"; Transliteration: "Akuma to Sakubō" (Japanese: 悪魔と策謀)	Satoshi Ōsedo	Toshizo Nemoto	Masashi Kojima	April 5, 2024
After Clayman's defeat, Rimuru continues to attend Walpurgis, to which Leon Cromwell and Luminous Valentine leave early, Rimuru gains the ability to replicate dishes and refuses to let Milim Nava drink wine due to him thinking that she's too young for it, and Ramiris passes out from overdrinking. Rimuru returns home where he is greeted by the citizens, including Diablo. While having matcha pudding, Rimuru finds out that Veldora told everything to Diablo and had his pudding taken away in response, but soon feels pity and gives it back. He learns that Diablo had healed Falmuth's king and his subordinates, who were previously tortured by Shion for threatening Tempest. During a flashback, the three became Diablo's servants after he heals the subordinates and they all travel back to Falmuth along with Youm, Grucius, and Mjurran. Meanwhile, the nobles in Falmuth are unable to heal the king. Once Diablo's group arrives, they present their story of the defeat of Falmuth's army and Veldora's revival. This shocks the nobles as the Western Holy Church claimed that Veldora was long gone, until Razen points out that a True Dragon can never be destroyed as they can be reborn. They also learned that the Dryads helped Rimuru bargain with Veldora to calm his wrath. This leads the nobles to see that attacking Tempest was a bad idea. When Carlos, one of the nobles, refuses to believe this nor agree with the idea to ally with Tempest, Razen imprisons him in a block of ice. After healing the king using one of Rimuru's potions, Diablo has them choose to either ally with Tempest or continue the war, all while warning them to not double cross Rimuru or else. This gives the nobles very little time to decide. After learning of this, Rimuru leaves Diablo to handle the situation.
50	2	"The Saint's Intentions"; Transliteration: "Seijin no Omowaku" (Japanese: 聖人の思惑)	Chen Xiaocan	Toshizo Nemoto	Masashi Kojima	April 12, 2024
Laplace informs Yuuki and the rest of the Moderate Harlequin Alliance of Clayman's death and that their plan to take down Rimuru has ended in failure, to which he and Footman almost get into a fight. Now seeing that his plans for world domination is being compromised, Yuuki begins planning revenge, but also decides to lay low for a while as Rimuru is too powerful for them to fight. Meanwhile, at the Western Holy Empire, Hinata recalls her past, including her confrontation with Roy, his twin brother Louis, and Luminous Valentine. Louis later informs her of Roy's death, Veldora's revival, Falmuth's defeat, and that Tempest is still intact; Hinata realizes that Rimuru is still alive and tricked her into letting him escape, but suspects that she's being manipulated due to information that she received from an Eastern merchant. They later deliver the news to Luminous, who, after she explains what happened in Walpurgis, warns them not to engage Veldora or Rimuru, knowing how powerful they are now, and that she has not declared them enemies. Also, she reveals that although Rimuru technically isn't evil, he presumably still holds a grudge towards Hinata for trying to destroy him and his nation. Meanwhile, in Falmuth, the king holds a meeting and, after learning of the events that occurred in Walpurgis, Blumund's allegiance with Tempest, and what the Western Holy Church plan to do next, they eventually decide to form an alliance with Tempest after all. The king also steps down from his throne and passes it to his brother.
51	3	"Peaceful Days"; Transliteration: "Heiwana Hibi" (Japanese: 平和な日々)	Tomio Yamauchi	Toshizo Nemoto	Shinji Itadaki	April 19, 2024
In Tempest, Rimuru and his subordinates recall their battle against Clayman. After a few days, Diablo informs Rimuru that Falmuth has formed a peace treaty with Tempest and that a civil war will break out due to the king stepping down and having his brother take over, which will eventually allow Youm to take the throne. Diablo also reports that the Church may be planning to take action to this. Afterwards, the residents of Eurazania move into Tempest for the time being, accompanied be two of the Three Beastketeers. Gabil returns from his mission, who also hands Rimuru a letter from Milim, who intends to invite guests to give her cooking lessons during her next visit. Geld later returns and reveals that there were complications during his mission, so the two spend time with each other at a bar. Rigurd soon reveals that Blumund has formed a relationship with Tempest. The Oni later inform Rimuru of the dangerous Kusha Mountains, inhabited by the Tengu. Benimaru decides to go speak to them alongside Albis, leading everyone to suspect that he has a crush on her. Hakuro later tells Rimuru about the dark elves that reside in Clayman's domain, and Rimuru convinces Hakuro to keep it a secret. During another meeting, Rimuru decides to invite more people to his nation and expand his territory.
52	4	"Everyone Has a Part to Play"; Transliteration: "Sorezore no Yakuwari" (Japanese: それぞれの役割)	Tomio Yamauchi	Shingo Irie	Taizo Yoshida	April 26, 2024
After Rimuru hears of dangerous monsters that lurk around the road to Tempest, Vesta and Kaijin reveal that they have planned to place Anti-Magic Barriers around the road to keep visitors safe. Veldora is hoping to unleash his aura, but the others insist that he doesn't as it could kill them; however, Diablo warns Rimuru that he cannot contain his aura for long. Rimuru tasks Geld with building Milim a castle and learns from Diablo that Edmaris, Flamuth's former king, is teaching Youm how to properly act like a noble, and Reyhiem is on his way to the Holy Western Empire to deliver his message. Veldora also begins to remember Luminous after Rimuru mentions her. Recalling his encounter with Hinata, Rimuru begins to wonder who is the mastermind behind Falmuth's attack, Hinata's attempt to kill him, and Clayman's motives, while Diablo suspects that there is another mastermind. Suspecting that a merchant is helping these masterminds, Rimuru has his subordinates hunt down the merchant. Meanwhile, at the Western Holy Empire, Hinata begins a meeting.
53	5	"Meeting of Both Sides"; Transliteration: "Ryōyoku Kaigi" (Japanese: 両翼会議)	Masaharu Tomoda	Okumura Junichirō	Masashi Kojima	May 3, 2024
Hinata, Nikolaus Spertus, and the Ten Great Saints talk about the revival of Veldora, Rimuru's motive, and Falmuth's downfall, with Louis watching the meeting in secret. While starting to regret not listening to Rimuru in the first place, Hinata also suspects that the Eastern merchants visiting Tempest and the Holy Western Empire are up to something. She also explains that Luminous has ordered them to not attack Rimuru and his nation, but the Saints aren't happy with this. After revealing Rimuru's origins and the merchants' deception, she decides to negotiate with Rimuru despite the Saints' concerns. Reyhiem then arrives to deliver his message; three of the Seven Luminaries, followers of Luminous, appear to listen to this. Reyhiem then explains how dangerous Rimuru is and the truth behind the defeat of Falmuth's army. He also displays a crystal ball that shows Rimuru challenging her, which, to Reyhiem's shock, was not his intended message. Despite having suspicions, Hinata agrees to challenge Rimuru. The Luminaries support her decision and provide her with a powerful sword called the Dragon Buster. Hinata then leaves to confront Rimuru despite Nikolaus having doubts that the situation will go well. Meanwhile, at Tempest, Rimuru learns that Hinata is coming, accompanied by some of the Saints. Rimuru is confused that his message didn't play out well, but Diablo appears and reveals that Reyhiem was murdered.
54	6	"Those Approaching"; Transliteration: "Semari Kuru Mono-tachi" (Japanese: 迫り来る者達)	Chen Xiaocan	Toshizo Nemoto	Shinji Itadaki	May 10, 2024
Rimuru informs his subordinates of Reyhiem's death, Hinata's approach, and the forces gathering in Falmuth to eliminate the demon seemly responsible for killing Reyhiem. They request the help of Adalmann for more information about the Western Holy Church. Adalmann tells them about the Seven Luminaries, the Ten Great Saints, and Hinata. Diablo also explains the current situation going on in Falmuth, leading Rimuru to decide to take action against this. Upon learning that Hinata is bringing an army with her and will be arriving in two weeks, Rimuru prepares to face them, all without trying to kill them. Albis and Suphia also decide to join in on the conflict. Veldora also wants to join in, but Rimuru has him serve as their last line of defense. Meanwhile, it is revealed that Glenda, one of the Ten Great Saints, and Damrada, the merchant who manipulated Hinata earlier, are working for the Rosso family and the Five Elders, led by Granville and his granddaughter Maribel, who seek to take out both Hinata and Rimuru.
55	7	"Saint and Demon Clash"; Transliteration: "Seima Gekitotsu" (Japanese: 聖魔激突)	Satoshi Ōsedo	Shingo Irie	Satoshi Ōsedo & Hideki Yamazaki	May 17, 2024
Rimuru recalls his first encounter with Hinata and wonders what she'll do. Meanwhile, Hinata learns that four of the Saints have followed her and she reluctantly lets them tag along. Arriving in Blumund, they notice how much the city has changed, leading them to suspect that Tempest had something to do with this. They also try out food at one of the restaurants, but end up eating all of it. As they continue their journey to Tempest, they are amazed by the road's structure and how friendly the monsters in Tempest are. While stopping for a drink of water, the group begin to see that Rimuru is not as much of a threat as they thought, though Hinata is unsure of why Rimuru wants to challenge her. Rimuru soon learns that Hinata is close. Meanwhile, the Seven Luminaries have sent two other Saints with an army to destroy Rimuru and his city, all while tricking them into believing that Hinata is in danger, but they are ambushed by Tempest's forces; this leads Rimuru to take the situation as a real challenge. After Hinata learns from Nikolaus that the other three Saints, the Three Battlesages, are taking part in Falmuth's civil war, Rimuru interferes with her telepathic call before it is cut off and prepares for battle. Meanwhile, the Holy Empire's army is overwhelmed just as Rimuru and his subordinates arrive. When Hinata's group arrives at the battlefield, she notices how powerful the monsters are and, believing that Rimuru truly does want to fight her, prepares to face the monster leader.
56	8	"Misunderstanding"; Transliteration: "Botan no Kake Chigai" (Japanese: ボタンのかけ違い)	Yasushi Muroya	Okumura Junichirō	Satoshi Shimizu	May 24, 2024
As Luminous cuddles the Holy Ark that houses a mysterious sleeping woman, Louis and Gunther inform her of Hinata and the Seven Luminaries' actions. Luminous leaves with them to handle the situation. Meanwhile, back in Tempest, Shion faces off against Leonard and Garde, the leaders of the army, who place a Holy Field around her. However, Shion reveals that she is a Wicked Oni and proves to be too strong for them, although she is ordered to not kill them. Though Leonard admits defeat, Garde refuses to, until Shion destroys the Holy Field. Leonard begins to grow suspicious of the situation after noticing that Garde is acting differently. While Hinata explains that she did not intend to bring an army, she also didn't know of Reyhiem's death, while Rimuru does not recall challenging Hinata and believes that she is responsible for the attack. While their subordinates split up to fight each other, Rimuru and Hinata fight each other one on one. Seeing that Rimuru is stronger than before and her skill-stealing ability has no effect on him, Hinata takes on a much stronger form to combat him, but without using the Dragon Buster; she instead resorts to using her own weapon. During the fight, Hinata remembers her past with Shizu after seeing a vision of her over Rimuru. At the same time, Rimuru gains a new ability that allows him to predict Hinata's attacks. The fight ends in a draw, and Rimuru suspects that his message to Hinata has been tampered with. Rimuru's subordinates emerge victorious over Hinata's. After surviving Hinata's final attack by sacrificing a previous ability to gain a new one that allows him to withstand it, the two immediately become friends, but then realize that the Dragon Buster is a rigged trap as it suddenly releases a deadly attack that strikes Hinata after she pushes Rimuru out of the way.
57	9	"The Scheming of the Seven Days"; Transliteration: "Shichiyō Anyaku" (Japanese: 七曜暗躍)	Masahiko Suzuki	Tatsuto Higuchi	Ken Ōtsuka	May 31, 2024
In Falmuth, Damrada analyzes Rimuru, Edmaris, and Edward's motives, while preparing to leave as the demon who supposedly killed Reyhiem is too powerful for him to deal with. Meanwhile, Edward prepares to attack Youm's hometown with the Three Battlesages helping him; however, the three are also seeking to defeat the one who killed Reyhiem. Diablo is observing this from the skies and sees that one of the Three Battlesages is leaving with the army, while the other two are with Edward. He then has Hakuro deal with the army, all while trying not to kill them. Edward's army is quickly defeated by Rimuru's forces, forcing them to retreat. Diablo then confronts Edward and the two Battlesages, and creates a forcefield around them to keep innocents out of the way. He demands that they make peace with Youm, but Edward refuses as he is aware of Diablo's actions in Falmuth, also believing that he killed Reyhiem due to false evidence from Glenda. Diablo nevertheless challenges them and easily defeats Damrada's men, also revealing his true nature that scares off the soldiers and Edward, leaving only the two Battlesages to face him. They too prove to be no match for him, resulting in Glenda fleeing. The remaining Battlesage eventually realizes that Diablo is innocent, but three of the Seven Luminaries arrive and attack Diablo's forcefield in an attempt to eliminate witnesses. Meanwhile, Hinata is gravely injured by the Dragon Buster's attack while Rimuru tries to save her life, albeit unsuccessfully as only holy magic can heal her. Two of the Seven Luminaries arrive and, after restraining the four Saints to prevent them from healing Hinata, intend to destroy Hinata for seemly disobeying their orders.
58	10	"God and Demon Lord"; Transliteration: "Kami to Maō" (Japanese: 神と魔王)	Daisuke Tsukushi	Toshizo Nemoto	Kenta Mimuro	June 7, 2024
The Luminaries prepare to exact punishment on Hinata for her apparent disobedience. Leonard realizes that he had been tricked, but is stabbed by Garde, whom Rimuru realizes is actually one of the Luminaries in disguise, having killed the real Garde. With his cover blown, the Luminary removes his disguise. Diablo contacts Rimuru and reveals that it was they who killed Reyhiem and framed him for it, and also altered Rimuru's message so to manipulate him and Hinata into fighting each other. The Saints realize that the Luminaries are the real masterminds behind the war. Rimuru orders his subordinates to kill the Luminaries, but they prove to be strong opponents, though Shion was able to stop their magic circle. The Luminaires release a powerful attack to wipe out Rimuru, Hinata, and their subordinates, but Rimuru blocks it with a copy of a previously-sacrificed ability. The Luminaries then use the same attack that Hinata previously used on Rimuru in their first fight, but this attack also fails to defeat Rimuru and Hinata as he manages to defend them both with a new ability. This frees the Saints. The Luminaries decide to let Luminous deal with them, but the latter personally arrives with Louis; the Saints learn who their god really is. After Luminous heals Hinata, Hinata recalls her unhappy childhood, how she entered the Central World and gained her skill-stealing ability, and how she met Shizu. As Hinata heals Leonard, Luminous kills the Luminaries for their corruptive actions and disobedience. Meanwhile, the other three Luminaries fail to destroy Diablo's forcefield. The reporters realize Diablo's innocence, though Diablo does not forgive Edward for his earlier actions and in turn, Edward decides to pass the throne to Youm in exchange for protection. The Luminaries unleash a powerful attack on Diablo, but he turns the tables and kills them instead. Back at the Holy Western Empire, Nikolaus confronts the last Luminary, having learned of their scheme, and kills him with a magical amulet. Unbeknownst to him, the Luminary survived and is actually Granville. He and Maribel realize that their plan failed and start planning their next move against Rimuru. Meanwhile, Veldora isn't all that happy that he got left out of the fight, but accidentally reveals that Luminous is a Demon Lord in front of everyone, resulting in the two fighting as a result of Luminous having a long held grudge against him. Rimuru is nevertheless glad that he settled things with Hinata and Luminous. In the aftermath, the group enjoy the public baths and Japanese foods.
59	11	"Reconciliation and Agreement"; Transliteration: "Wakai to Kyōtei" (Japanese: 和解と協定)	Naokatsu Tsuda & Neito Hirohara	Toshizo Nemoto	Masashi Kojima	June 14, 2024
Damrada speaks with Granville and Maribel regarding Diablo's presence and their failed attempt to defeat Hinata and Rimuru; however, Granville is still determined to eliminate Rimuru. Deciding to not be involved any further, Damrada leaves, leaving Granville to swear revenge. Meanwhile, Rimuru speaks with Hinata and Luminous regarding past events that led to their conflicts along with Clayman and Damrada's motives. Luminous explains the origin of the Seven Luminaries, their true intentions, and their connection with Clayman, and that Granville was once a hero who previously fought her. Rimuru also suspects that Yuuki is the one pulling the strings. As they make peace with each other, Luminous vows to have Veldora punished one day. As a result, they decide to have two of the Saints remain in Tempest and build a church in the city to symbolize their alliance. Hinata also receives a new sword from Rimuru. Both groups then spend the evening together. Damrada later speaks with Yuuki, who had secretly assisted the Rozzo family with their scheme, about what he learned along with Diablo's presence in Tempest, making the latter see that his revenge plan wasn't successful while knowing that it is not wise to face Diablo. Damrada leaves and Yuuki prepares to make his next move.
60	12	"Festival Preparations"; Transliteration: "Kaisai Junbi" (Japanese: 開催準備)	Takaaki Wada	Shingo Irie	Takaaki Wada	June 21, 2024
Rimuru decides to host a festival to celebrate the opening of Rimuru City and his country being accepted as a nation. He starts by seeing how Vesta and Gabil have been doing with the healing potions and then has a brief talk with Shion. Next, he and Shuna pay a visit to see Yoshida, a chef who is also an Otherworlder, who requests a special dish from them in exchange for his allegiance. Meanwhile, viscount Lord Kazak speaks with Gard Mjollmille regarding elf slaves, leading Gard to see that he's a criminal. Rimuru disrupts the meeting, to Kazak's annoyance. He then considers taking Rimuru as a slave, but a disgusted Gard kicks him out in retaliation and ends his business with him, leading Kazak to swear revenge. He and Rimuru talk about Kazak's motives and the upcoming festival. They also consider opening a restaurant for Veldora to work at in Tempest. Rimuru also requests for five people to help Veldora run the shop. He also has plans to turn his city into a resort with many fun activities for people. After learning about the theater and arena in the Kingdom of Ingrassia, Rimuru also decides to set up his own arena in Tempest. Gard agrees to help out of gratitude for Rimuru saving his life earlier. They then continue to talk about their upcoming plans. Later, Rimuru talks to Fuze, who is emotionally overwhelmed by the recent events, especially the truth behind the Seven Luminaries' real intentions. Rimuru passes some invitations to him to give to the king of Blumund. Fuze also tells him about what Yuuki was recently doing. Rimuru decides to invite him too along with Milim, which worries Fuze.
61	13	"Invitations for All Nations"; Transliteration: "Kakkoku to Shōtaijō" (Japanese: 各国と招待状)	Yasushi Muroya	Okumura Junichirō	Yasushi Muroya	June 28, 2024
Dwargo and his subordinates: Henrietta, Jane, and Vaughn, learn of Rimuru's recent actions and his evolution to Demon Lord. They also receive an invitation to Tempest's upcoming festival as Dwargo ponders about Rimuru's motives. Meanwhile, back in Tempest, Rimuru is preparing for the festival and comes across Ramiris, Beretta, and Treyni. They have left her old labyrinth and are trying to establish a new home in Tempest. Rimuru decides to build a labyrinth somewhere under the arena that is still in construction for Ramiris to live in and also create a dungeon in that labyrinth as an attraction for adventurers. Rimuru also hires Ramiris to help him create the dungeon and is promised good payment in return. Ramiris also decides to hire the Lycanthropes living in where they plan to build the labyrinth for help, as well as move their homes inside it. At the Sorcerous Dynasty of Thalion, the kingdom's ruler Elmesia has also received an invitation to the festival. Three months ago, she sent Erald to form a peace agreement with Tempest, even though he is concerned by the fact that it is a monster nation. Learning of Yoshida's connection with Rimuru along with Rimuru's plans, which proves overwhelming for Erald, Elmesia deducts that Rimuru is actually an Otherworlder who came from Earth like Shizu, Hinata, and Yuuki, except he was reincarnated.
62	14	"Labyrinth and Storm Dragon"; Transliteration: "Meikyū to Bōfū Ryū" (Japanese: 迷宮と暴風竜)	Chen Xiaocan	Tatsuto Higuchi	Gō Kurosaki	July 5, 2024
The arena in Tempest is almost finished while the dungeon is in construction. Ramiris had finished transporting the Lycanthropes' town inside it. She and Rimuru also get the idea to put stronger monsters in the dungeon as people proceed further inside it. Rimuru visits Kurobe for weapons to put in the dungeon, to which it is revealed that he had become a skilled craftsman after Rimuru evolved into a Demon Lord. Rimuru is hopeful that the dungeon and arena will make Tempest famous as Kurobe provides Rimuru with a new sword, though it is not finished yet. Later, Rimuru tells Veldora about the dungeon and has him live there as its strongest guardian and master so he can harmlessly release his aura from within. He then brings Veldora to the unfinished arena and sets up a room for him inside the dungeon with Ramiris's help where he can fight adventurers if they make it to him, along with a private room where he can read manga. The dungeon is finished in about a week, outfitted with a hundred transforming rooms and save points. Rimuru also decides to add bosses for some of the floors. Ramiris reveals her creation: a bracelet that can teleport people back to the beginning of the dungeon if they are defeated, but only one person can use it and the bracelet itself can only be used once. In the final room, Veldora finally unleashes his aura and assumes his dragon form as his aura travels across the dungeon. Rimuru warns Veldora to only release his aura inside the dungeon and also has Beretta serve Ramiris from now on. Afterwards, the group develop traps and obstacles for the dungeon. When Ramiris cannot put in terrain effects, Milim shows up to help.
63	15	"Audience"; Transliteration: "Ekkenshiki" (Japanese: 謁見式)	Satoshi Ōsedo	Toshizo Nemoto	Satoshi Shimizu	July 19, 2024
Milim gets into a fight with Ramiris over the fact that the latter now works for Rimuru and that she too wants to help before Shuna breaks it up. After deducting that Milim snuck out of her domain without Carrion and Frey knowing, Rimuru has her capture some elemental dragons to put in the dungeon as well as help finish with its construction. Gard visits Tempest for a tour and after learning that he was attacked by a monster, they suspect that it was sent by Kazak. During a meeting, Rimuru is warned that the tribes of the Jura Forest are coming to visit and may revolt against him if they don't deem him worthy to own the place. Rimuru is given a king's outfit to wear, to his embarrassment. Around this time, Falmuth has collapsed and a new kingdom will take its place as Youm becomes its new king. The next day, the tribes arrive. The first to visit are the Lizardmen, where their leader Abiru is informed of how his son is doing. The last group to visit are Trya and Doris. After meeting up with Ramiris and Treyni, Rimuru decides to have them work for Ramiris as well as help manage the Dungeon. On the second day, Rimuru meets two rival tribes: the Bovoids and the Equinoids, who both want to serve Rimuru so they can take each other down. Their argument is disrupted by something breaking through the barrier around the city. It revealed to be three brothers, who are the sons of another Demon Lord. They are upset by the fact that Rimuru robbed their chance of becoming a Demon Lord by killing Clayman. When they challenge Shion, Rimuru has them fight in the arena. After Shion easily defeats them, scaring Rimuru a bit, they reveal that Dagruel is their father and he had sent them to Tempest to train under Rimuru. Shion agrees to become their mentor and the Bovoids and the Equinoids both swear loyalty to Rimuru after watching the fight. The last visiting group are a tribe of elves, who are grateful of Rimuru for ending the conflict between the Bovoids and the Equinoids, which previously forced them to relocate. Rimuru provides them with a place to live in the Dungeon and after learning that some of their kind never returned, he suspects that Kazak is to blame and sends Souei to investigate. On the third day, Geld and Diablo have returned from Falmuth as Rimuru prepares to meet the arriving group: the Tengu.
64	16	"Benimaru's Ordeal"; Transliteration: "Benimaru no Junan" (Japanese: ベニマルの受難)	Daisuke Tsukushi	Shingo Irie	Daisuke Tsukushi	July 26, 2024
Raphael tells Rimuru about the Tengu and the female Tengu that's visiting is named Momiji. Sometime earlier, Benimaru and Albis were sent by Rimuru to negotiate with the Tengu, but find a barrier around their village. Only Benimaru and Albis are allowed in, where they meet Momiji. Benimaru wishes to pass through the village and build a tunnel through the mountains to Thalion. Momiji does not like that idea because the mountains are sacred to them. After she insults Albis, they get into a fight before Benimaru intervenes. Kaede, Momiji's mother, arrives and stops their bickering. She explains her history with the ogres and a human named Araki Byakuya, who passed away years ago. She also reveals that Hakuro is her husband, making him Momiji's father. Kaede also proposes that Momiji should be engaged to Benimaru in exchange for the Tengu's allegiance with Tempest, but they are both hesitant as Momiji wishes to win Benimaru's heart first. After learning of Kaede's illness, Benimaru deducts that she lost lots of life energy giving birth to her daughter and naming her. Returning to the present, Momiji makes a deal with Rimuru while fearing that he may want to wage war with them due to his connection with Frey, who once tried to take over the Tengu's domain so she can conquer Thalion, but she agrees to form an alliance with Rimuru after clearing up the misunderstanding with Frey, who had long given up her plans in favor of Milim's capital. She gets embarrassed when the letter that her mother sent to Rimuru reveals her feelings for Benimaru; there are actually two letters and the first was for Hakuro, not Rimuru. Hakuro returns from Falmuth and meets his daughter for the first time while agreeing to improve her fighting skills and is also supportive of her arranged engagement to Benimaru. Rimuru's subordinates then talk about their relationships with others, leading them to decide to compete for those that they love.
65	17	"The Lightspeed Hero"; Transliteration: "Senkō no Yūsha" (Japanese: 閃光の勇者)	Hitomi Ezoe	Tatsuto Higuchi	Futoshi Higashide	August 2, 2024
Rimuru introduces Gard, who's now in charge of Tempest's finances, to his subordinates (with the exception of Milim, who had to leave) and explains his plans for the upcoming festival, which includes an opera performance, the arena, and the Dungeon. After learning about the overgrowing trees in the Dungeon, Ranga suggests having the fox demon that Rimuru previously rescued from Clayman to deal with it as well as become one of the bosses of the Dungeon. Rimuru names her Kumara, though giving her a name drains a lot of energy out of him. Souei informs the group that Kazak and his men have been arrested and explains that the Lightspeed Hero Masayuki is the one who stopped his operations. Meanwhile, Masayuki and his group are on their way to Tempest. Flashbacks reveal that Masayuki is also an Otherworlder. After transporting to the Central World, he developed a special power that allows him to fight strong foes and eventually formed a group of heroes that includes himself and three other members. Yuuki later requests for him to take down a slave trading company called Orthrus in the Kingdom of Ballachia. Gosel, one of Orthus's leaders, tries to make him look like a criminal after he discovers his true motives, but his party members foil this ploy and heal the surviving victim as a witness to the king. With the king's assistance, Masayuki destroys Orthrus' operations and is asked to return the rescued elves to the Jura Forest, which by now has become Rimuru's territory. The townsfolks believe that he is planning to fight the monster leader, whom they think is a threat. Returning to the present, Masayuki is doubtful that Rimuru is of any threat and although his party is thinking about challenging Rimuru, he decides to see what Rimuru is like first after learning about his fight with Hinata. Learning of his approach, Rimuru's subordinates intend to challenge him, but he decides to deal with him personally to avoid confrontations.
66	18	"A Throng of Visitors"; Transliteration: "Senkyaku Banrai" (Japanese: 千客万来)	Migmi	Okumura Junichirō	Chihiro Nitta	August 16, 2024
Many visitors arrive for the festival. The first to arrive is King Blumund, who is grateful that Rimuru took care of Falmuth and makes a deal with him. The next to visit is Dwargo, who heard of his fight with Hinata along with the Western Holy Church's connections with Tempest, to which Rimuru tells him about the Seven Luminaries' plot. Youm is the third to visit along with Mjurran, who by now has become Youm's wife and that she and Youm are now the new rulers of the new kingdom that was built in place of the collapsed Falmuth. Accompanying them are Grucius and Edgar, the son of Falmuth's former king, who is surprised by the fact that Youm becoming king was Rimuru's doing. Rimuru later meets Yuuki and they talk about their previous conflicts. Yuuki agrees to go to the festival and introduces Kagali to Rimuru. Kagali reveals that she had recently explored some old ruins discovered near Dagruel's domain while Rimuru tells them about a discovery that Clayman made in the ruins. Afterwards, Rimuru and Yuuki visit Class S, who are also eager to go to the festival upon being invited. After meeting up with Tiss, she and the students prepare for their trip to Tempest as Rimuru teleports them all there. Rimuru gives the students an amulet that allows to them buy free stuff for the festival, but then learns that Masayuki has arrived and goes to greet them. Though Masayuki's group want to fight Rimuru, Masayuki (who, unlike his allies, doesn't want to), Rimuru, and Yuuki try to talk them out of it. Rimuru then makes a deal: if they can win tomorrow's battle tournament, then he will fight them. Despite having doubts, Masayuki is pressured by his comrades into accepting the challenge as they leave to prepare for it.
67	19	"Festival Eve"; Transliteration: "Zen'yasai" (Japanese: 前夜祭)	Atsushi Nakayama	Toshizo Nemoto	Chihiro Nitta	August 23, 2024
Many guests gather in a ballroom in Tempest, where Rimuru begins the festival eve. Geld and Hakuro cut up a giant monstrous fish to make sushi. Hinata and Yuuki join Rimuru for a meal, while Rimuru learns of distribution issues going on in the Central World. A large dragon appears above Tempest, indicating the arrival of Elmesia. Dwargon tells Rimuru about the history of Elmesia and Thalion, leading Rimuru to be cautious of her. As Elmesia arrives, she tries to charm Rimuru with her powers, but it is blocked by Raphael. She requests a private meeting with Rimuru later. Gard later informs Rimuru of the motivations of some arriving merchants. Milim, Frey, and Carrion then arrive for the festival along with the Dragon Faithful while Maribel is shown to have also attended. After Rimuru accidentally insults Frey, he apologizes to avoid a bad outcome while Carrion finds this amusing and is punished by Frey. Middray considers the food an insult to Milim, leading an offended Shuna to force him to try it, making him reconsider following a lecture from Shuna. Benimaru and Rimuru are both proud of her. The next day, the festival itself is about to begin as Rimuru, again dressed as a king, gives his speech and announces that he has no intention of harming humans while warning them that he will treat them with hostility if they do consider him a threat as the festival officially starts.
68	20	"Nation's Opening Festival"; Transliteration: "Kaikoku-sai" (Japanese: 開国祭)	Satoshi Ōsedo	Shingo Irie	Chihiro Nitta & Kiyoshi Okuyama	August 30, 2024
Class S is surprised to learn that Rimuru is the king of the monster nation while Tiss is too shocked to wake up upon learning of this. Hinata then arrives and Rimuru introduces her to Class S and explains her history, warning them to not insult her. She agrees to watch over Class S as she reminds them of Shizu. Hinata also reveals that Luminous is also coming since she was also invited. A concert begins, starting with an orchestra led by a young halfling named Takt, followed by a duet performed by Shuna and Shion. The next event involves a potion experiment demonstrated by Vesta and Gabiru, which astounds Jeff. After meeting up with Hinata and Class S, Rimuru attends a meeting with Luminous, who requests cultural exchange after listening to the concert and gifts him with a new power and in return, Rimuru allows her to have her researchers do business in Tempest. During a meal, Rimuru speaks with Hinata and Yuuki regarding what happened so far. Later, Gard reveals that they are low on money and the coins they have are of no help. They suspect that someone is trying to sabotage them. Rimuru then forms a plan to deal with the financial problem, but they decide to continue enjoying the festival first. The next day, the Martial Arts Tournament is about to begin.
69	21	"The Martial Arts Tournament"; Transliteration: "Butō Taikai" (Japanese: 武闘大会)	Yasushi Muroya	Tatsuto Higuchi	Ken Ōtsuka	September 6, 2024
Sometime earlier, Rimuru makes plans for the tournament and has Shion, Diablo, and Benimaru become part of a group called the Elite Four, but forbids them from entering the competition as they would easily win. He also decides that whoever wins the tournament will either become the fourth member of the Elite Four or will be allowed to fight him. As the tournament starts, Masayuki, Jinrai, a warrior named Gaiye, the leaders of the Bovoids and the Equinoids, and Lion Mask, who is actually Carrion in disguise, pass the preliminaries. Gobta and Geld are also signed up for the tournament. Rimuru starts the competition and promises to fight whoever wins. The Bovoid and Equinoid leaders fight each other, with the Bovoid leader winning. Masayuki and Jinrai are to fight each other, but Jinrai forfeits to ensure Masayuki wins. As Gaiye and Gobta prepare to fight each other, Gaiye reveals his arrogant side, which angers Diablo. Though he overwhelms Gobta, the latter wins with Ranga's help. Geld and Lion Mask fight each other next, with Lion Mask winning and Geld fairly admitting defeat. In the semi-finals, Masayuki prepares to fight the Bovoid leader next, but after he gives out a speech, the Bovoid leader agrees to forfeit and challenge him later in the Dungeon. Lion Mask and Gobta are up next and although Lion Mask has the upper hand, Gobta wins with the assistance of Rimuru and Ranga while convincing Lion Mask to forfeit. In the final round, Gobta faces Masayuki next, but the tournament is put on hold until tomorrow as everyone celebrates with a meal, but Rimuru becomes concerned about the upcoming fight between Gobta and Masayuki. Dwargo later comes to talk to Rimuru.
70	22	"Settling the Score with the Hero"; Transliteration: "Yūsha to no Ketchaku" (Japanese: 勇者との決着)	Natsumi Suzuki	Okumura Junichirō	Masashi Kojima	September 13, 2024
Rimuru reveals that he called Dwargo over to deal with the financial problem. Elmesia also joins in on the conversation and agrees to help with the problem, providing him with a large amount of gold. During their conversation, they suspect that someone from the Western Nations is responsible for the financial problem. Souei goes to investigate. Elmesia enacts a pact between her and Rimuru, and questions him about Diablo due to her being cautious of him. Rimuru promises to stop him should he ever go rogue, to Elmesia's surprise. Dwargo also promises to aid Rimuru in the future while Elmesia explains that she will try to stop Rimuru if he does turn evil. They nevertheless form an alliance afterwards. The next day, the tournament continues with Gobta and Masayuki preparing to face each other, but Masayuki's fear begins to grow on him. Gobta reveals that he has gained the ability to fuse with Ranga, but he messes up and misses Masayuki, hitting the wall instead due to him being too inexperienced with his new skill. Despite winning by default, Masayuki decides to forfeit as he believes that he isn't ready to face Rimuru just yet, though the audience still cheer for him. Rimuru learns of Masayuki's influence on the audience and has Souei invite him to lunch later. Gobta is deemed the winner of the competition and becomes the fourth member of the Elite Four while Masayuki accepts Rimuru's invitation. Milim decides to help train Gobta and Ranga so they can handle their new form better. During Rimuru's meeting with Masayuki, he learns of Masayuki's true identity as an Otherworlder and the latter learns that Rimuru is a human reincarnated as a slime. Because he doesn't enjoy being a hero, he decides to become Rimuru's subordinate. The two also discuss Rimuru's plan to open the Dungeon to the public.
71	23	"The Labyrinth Is Opened"; Transliteration: "Meikyū Kaihō" (Japanese: 迷宮開放)	Naokatsu Tsuda	Shingo Irie	Naokatsu Tsuda & Neito Hirohara	September 20, 2024
On the third day of the festival, the Dungeon is officially open to the public. The groups that are taking part in it are Team Great Lightning, Kabal's Party, and Team Lightspeed, who have been given a map for the Dungeon. Gaiye also takes part in the event in hopes of humiliating Rimuru, to Diablo and Shion's annoyance, though Rimuru stops them from attacking him. Four Dryads are tasked with observing the four groups and items are being sold to help them in the Dungeon so they cannot die. Gard also demonstrates the power of the resurrection bracelet by going into the Dungeon and having Gaiye slay him, to which he is revived and sent back to the entrance, though Rimuru is angered by Gaiye's ruthless actions. When Team Great Lightning falls into a trapdoor and Kabal's Party is able to easily avoid the traps, Rimuru is annoyed with Ramiris for modifying the rooms that he designed and giving Kabal's Party an unfair advantage after being bribed by Eren. Meanwhile, Team Lightspeed have reached the fourth floor through trapdoors and Gaiye is revealed to have a special ability that allows him to navigate through the Dungeon and find treasure easily. Team Great Lightning is eliminated several times while Kabal's Party have made it to the second floor where they defeat some bat monsters and obtain a sword before returning to the entrance with a magical whistle, but this convinces Rimuru to remove some of the trapdoors later. Meanwhile, Veldora is still waiting for challengers in the one hundredth floor. Team Lightspeed confront and defeat a spider monster, obtaining a sword before using their magic whistle to return to the entrance. Gaiye arrives too late to gain the treasure that Team Lightspeed got and demands that Delta, the Dryad accompanying him, brings the boss back early, but she cannot do so. Offended, he decides to no longer follow the rules and attacks Delta in response, but she overpowers him, disables his bracelet, and kills him, sending him back to the entrance where he is revived without his rewards. Grad warns challengers against disobeying the Dungeon rules while Team Great Lightning returns to the entrance after falling into another trap. Rimuru then announces that whoever can beat the entire Dungeon can challenge him. A party is then held afterwards. The next day, Rimuru still needs to pay those who had helped with the festival.
72	24	"After the Festival"; Transliteration: "Matsuri no Ato" (Japanese: 祭の後)	Daisuke Tsukushi	Tatsuto Higuchi	Masashi Kojima	September 27, 2024
A group of merchants gather around Gard demanding payment from Rimuru, as they will only accept dwarven money. Duke Muese, who is in league with the Rosso Family, offers to pay them himself so he can make Rimuru indebted to the Five Elders so they can bring Tempest down from within, but Rimuru shows up with the money he got from Elmesia to pay them while Benimaru, Shion, and Diablo grow suspicious of Muese. Reporters and Shuna enter the room as the payment is done, where Rimuru reveals what Tempest really is to them. When the merchants expect further payment, Rimuru refuses because of their earlier criticism of Tempest as well as only taking dwarven coins, therefore leading Rimuru to reject them out of distrust, ruining Muese's plan. Rimuru later has a meeting with their subordinates and allies regarding the earlier meeting with the merchants, having known of Muese's scheme, and the train that Rimuru plans to build. Momiji, seeing why Rimuru wanted to construct a tunnel through the mountains, agrees to the idea. Dwargo questions Rimuru about the projected screens used for the tournament and Elmesia enters a trading business with Rimuru. Youm, Mjurran, Fuze, and Velyard enter an agreement with Rimuru regarding the train. Rimuru and Gard also talk to Yuuki and Hinata regarding the Dungeon; the latter deciding to have some of the holy knights do some training in it while attracting outsiders to try it out due to Veldora growing bored of waiting for someone to face him. The Rosso Family learn of Muese's failure, but they still continue their plans to take over the Central World and destroy Tempest. While talking about the Eastern Merchants' motives, Hinata tells Rimuru about Damrada and that Laplace's earlier infiltration in Luminous's territory is connected. Later, Rimuru tells his subordinates of Yuuki and Clayman's connections with Moderate Harlequin Alliance and the Eastern Merchants, and decides to be ready for their actions in the future. The next day, some of the visitors leave while others remain in Tempest. A month later, Tempest receives a letter from the Council of the West.

== Recap special ==
No. overall	No. in season	Title	Directed by (Note: Production staff information is taken from the ending credits of each recap special)	Written by	Original release date
48.5	0	"Digression: Diablo's Journal"; Transliteration: "Kanwa: Diaburo Nikki" (Japanese: 閑話：ディアブロ日記)	Atsushi Nakayama & Fumihisa Aigasa	Toshizo Nemoto & Kazuyuki Fudeyasu	March 31, 2024
After Rimuru defeats Clayman during the Walpurgis Banquet, he is officially accepted as a Demon Lord and becomes a member of the Octagram. Meanwhile, Diablo, who is anxiously waiting back home in Tempest, cannot wait to hear about the exploits of his master. He decides to offer a contract to Veldora who is participating in the banquet. The two of them comment on the events of the battle against Falmuth and the Walpurgis Banquet in this special edition.
65.5	17.5	"Digression: Luminous Memories"; Transliteration: "Kanwa: Ruminasu Memorīzu" (Japanese: 閑話：ルミナスメモリーズ)	Fumihisa Aigasa	Toshizo Nemoto	August 9, 2024
Although Luminous and Hinata both held similar values, they ended up in a fierce fight. What happened behind the scenes of that tangled mess? Luminous, the one god of Lubelius and a member of Octagram, tells the story from her point of view.
