= Kristen McGuire =

American voice actress (born 1985)

- McGuire at GalaxyCon St Louis in 2026
- Born: Kristen Maegan McGuire; August 27, 1985 (age 41); Reston, Virginia, U.S.
- Occupations: Voice actress; ADR director
- Years active: 2013–present
- Employer(s): Sony Pictures Television; AMC Networks
- Spouse: Clifford Chapin (m. 2021)
- Children: 2
- Website: kriscomics.com

Kristen Maegan McGuire (born August 27, 1985) is an American voice actress. She started as a comic book artist, before later joining Funimation as a voice actress. Some of her noteworthy roles for Funimation and Sentai Studios include Milim Nava in That Time I Got Reincarnated as a Slime, Akane Kurokawa in Oshi no Ko, Ruri in Dr. Stone, Chiyo Kurihara in Prison School, Senko in The Helpful Fox Senko-san, and Alice in The Duke of Death and His Maid.

== Biography ==
McGuire started working professionally as a comic artist. She was later invited to a comic book convention as a guest of honor, where she met a voice actor with Funimation. After hearing Funimation offered open auditions, she decided to apply. Five months later in June 2013, she was asked to come in for an audition, where she was cast as minor characters in a Funimation dub.

== Personal life ==
McGuire was diagnosed with type 1 diabetes at age 21.

In 2021, McGuire became engaged with fellow voice actor Clifford Chapin. The couple have since been married.

== Filmography ==
=== Anime series ===
List of voice performances in anime series
Year	Title	Role	Notes	Source
2015	Mikagura School Suite	Yuriko		
2015	Maria the Virgin Witch	Vera		
2015	Sky Wizards Academy	Beach		
2015	Prison School	Chiyo Kurihara		
2015–16	Assassination Classroom	Hinano Kurahashi		
2016	Shōnen Maid	Amahara		
2016	Castle Town Dandelion	Karen Ayugase		
2016	Keijo!!!!!!!!	Hanabi Kawai		
2016	Yuri On Ice	Loop Nishigori		
2016–18	ReLIFE	An Onoya		
2017	Monster Hunter Stories: Ride On	Alph		
2017	Akiba's Trip: The Animation	Mashiro Kuga		
2017	Chain Chronicle – The Light of Haecceitas –	Farrah		
2017	Fuuka	Chitose Haruna		
2017	ēlDLIVE	Dolugh	Main	
2017	Gosick	Cecil Lafitte		
2017	Tokyo Ghoul:re	Haru Shirazu, Mitsushita		
2017	Tsukigakirei	Aira		
2017	Brave Witches	Mia Misumi		
2017	New Game!	Rin Toyama		
2017	King's Game The Animation	Hiroko		
2017	Anime-Gataris	Yui		
2018	Magical Girl Raising Project	Tama		
2018	My Hero Academia	Tatami Nakagame		
2018	How NOT to Summon a Demon Lord	Takuma Sakamoto (young)		
2018	B't X	Teppei (young)		
2018	Goblin Slayer	Fighter		
2018	Darling in the Franxx	Newly Appointed Nana		
2018	Senran Kagura Shinovi Master	Murasaki		
2018	Conception	Tarua		
2018	Ulysses: Jeanne d'Arc and the Alchemist Knight	Thomas		
2018	YU-NO: A Girl Who Chants Love At the Bound of This World	Kanna Hatano		
2018	A Certain Magical Index	Lancis		
2018–22	Teasing Master Takagi-san	Yukari Tenkawa	Seasons 1 and 3	
2018–present	That Time I Got Reincarnated As A Slime	Milim Nava		
2019	Azur Lane	Cleveland		
2019	Fruits Basket (2019)	Chie		
2019	Afterlost	Nami		
2019	The Helpful Fox Senko-san	Senko	Lead role	
2019	Nichijou - My Ordinary Life	Annaka		
2019	Hensuki	Mao Nanjo		
2019	Sarazanmai	Otone Jinnai		
2019	Fire Force	Yū		
2019	Kemono Friends	Southern Tamandua		
2019–26	Dr. Stone	Ruri		
2019–present	Demon Lord, Retry!	Luna Elegant		
2020	Nekopara	Cinnamon		
2020	Asteroid in Love	Yuu Nanami		
2020	Super HxEros	Moena Wakakusa		
2020	Higurashi: When They Cry - Gou	Daiki Tomita		
2020	Warlords of Sigrdifa	Misato Honjo		
2020	Assault Lily Bouquet	Tazusa Andō	Main role	
2020–22	Kaguya-Sama: Love is War	Erika Kose		
2020–23	Bofuri	Yui		
2021	Tamayomi: The Baseball Girls	Tamaki	Lead role	
2021	The Titan's Bride	Koichi's Mom		
2021	Back Arrow	Jim		
2021	Kemono Jihen	Inari		
2021	Combatants Will Be Dispatched!	Heine		
2021	86	Lecca Lin		
2021	SSSS.Dynazenon	Yume	Main role	
2021	The Duke of Death and His Maid	Alice	Lead role	
2021	The Honor Student at Magic High School	Saho Mizuo		
2021–present	Banished from the Hero's Party, I Decided to Live a Quiet Life in the Countryside	Tanta		
2022	She Professed Herself Pupil of the Wise Man	Amalette		
2022	Akebi's Sailor Uniform	Ms. Tamura		
2022	Date A Live IV	Mukuro Hoshimiya		
2022	Girls' Frontline	Skorpion		
2022	Restaurant to Another World	Myra		
2022	Aharen-san Is Indecipherable	Ooshiro		
2022	Trapped in a Dating Sim: The World of Otome Games is Tough for Mobs	Angelica		
2022	The Executioner and Her Way of Life	Manon Libelle		
2022	The Devil Is a Part-Timer!!	Hitoshi Sasaki	Ep. 8 & 9	
2022	Orient	Shunrai		
2022	Made in Abyss	Vueko		
2022	Natsume's Book of Friends	Little Fox		
2022	Lucifer and the Biscuit Hammer	Animus (young)		
2023	Trigun Stampede	Vash the Stampede (young)		
2023	The Ice Guy and His Cool Female Colleague	Fuyutsuki	Lead role	
2023	Ningen Fushin: Adventurers Who Don't Believe in Humanity Will Save the World	Claudine		
2023	Mobile Suit Gundam: The Witch from Mercury	Kal		
2023	The Aristocrat's Otherworldly Adventure: Serving Gods Who Go Too Far	Reine		
2023	A Galaxy Next Door	Momoka Morikuni		
2023	Kuma Kuma Kuma Bear	Senia	Season 2	
2023	Oshi no Ko	Akane Kurokawa		
2024	I've Somehow Gotten Stronger When I Improved My Farm-Related Skills	Ruri		
2024	Campfire Cooking in Another World with My Absurd Skill	Rita		
2024	My Instant Death Ability Is So Overpowered	Sion		
2024	Chained Soldier	Nei		
2026	A Misanthrope Teaches a Class for Demi-Humans	Tobari		
2026	Nippon Sangoku	Hina Hiraizumi		

=== Animation ===
List of voice performances in films
Year	Title	Role	Notes	Source
2016	RWBY	Nora Valkyrie (young)		
2021	Pinocchio and Friends	Miss Ollister		

=== Films ===
List of voice performances in films
Year	Title	Role	Notes	Source
2018	Hells	Abel (young)		
2021	Girls und Panzer das Finale: Part 2	Nishihara		
2023	That Time I Got Reincarnated as a Slime the Movie: Scarlet Bond	Milim Nava		

=== Video games ===
List of voice performances in video games
Year	Title	Role	Notes	Source
2018	Smite	Itsy Bitsy Chibi Arachne		
2019	Borderlands 3	Ash, Mother Fearest		
2020	Xeno Crisis	Sarah Ridley		
2021	Genshin Impact	Kachina, Aeval, Yuka, Wenjing		
2021	Muv-Luv: Project MIKHAIL	Asfana Shepsut		
2021	Battle Axe	Etheldred, Fae		
2021	Project Star: Makeover Story	Lily		
2022	Smite	Charybdis Prototype 2.0, Discordia Lunar Moth		
2022	Tiny Tina's Wonderlands	Flora	Credited in-game	
2022	Tower of Fantasy	Shiro, Seele	Credited in-game	
2022	Smite	Twilight Sky Jing Wei		
2022	Tales of Luminaria	Leo Fourcade (Child)		
2023	Goddess of Victory: Nikke	Biscuit, Rouge	Credited in-game	
2023	Dragonball Z: Kakarot - Bardock Alone Against Fate DLC	Kakarot, Female Saiyans	Credited in-game	
2023	Outerplane	Tio	Credited in-game	
2023	Street Fighter 6	World Tour Civilian Voices	Credited in-game	
2023	Disgaea 7	Pirilika	Credited in-game	
2024	Genshin Impact	Kachina	Credited in-game	
2024	Farmagia	Sylphie, Anemone	Credited in-game	
2024	Strinova	Maddelena		
2025	Rune Factory: Guardians of Azuma	Iroha		
2025	Everybody's Golf Hot Shots	Aya		
2025	Zenless Zone Zero	Ye Shunguang		

== Production credits ==
=== ADR directing ===
List of ADR directing credits
Year	Title	Role	Notes	Source
2017	Gamers!	ADR director		
2018	Citrus	ADR director		
2023	That Time I Got Reincarnated as a Slime the Movie: Scarlet Bond	Assistant ADR Director		

=== ADR script ===
List of ADR script credits
Year	Title	Role	Notes	Source
2016	Love Live! Sunshine!!	ADR scriptwriter	Shared with Tia Ballard	
2017	Interviews With Monster Girls	ADR scriptwriter		
2017	KanColle: Kantai Collection	ADR scriptwriter	Shared with Clayton Browning	
2017	Yamada-kun and the Seven Witches	ADR scriptwriter	Split with Niki Schultz	
2018	The Master of Ragnarok & Blesser of Einherjar	ADR scriptwriter		
2018	Magical Girl Raising Project	ADR scriptwriter		
2018	That Time I Got Reincarnated as a Slime	ADR scriptwriter		
2018	Senran Kagura Shinovi Master	ADR scriptwriter		
2020	Kakushigoto	ADR scriptwriter		
2021	Kuma Kuma Kuma Bear	ADR scriptwriter, ADR script supervisor		
2021	Diary of Our Days at the Breakwater	ADR scriptwriter	Shared with Leah Clark	
2021	Wonder Egg Priority	ADR scriptwriter		
2021	SSSS.Dynazenon	ADR scriptwriter		
2022	In the Land of Leadale	ADR scriptwriter		
2023	That Time I Got Reincarnated as a Slime the Movie: Scarlet Bond	ADR scriptwriter	Movie Credits	
