= That Time I Got Reincarnated as a Slime season 2 =

That Time I Got Reincarnated as a Slime
- Season 2
- Second season key visual
- No. of episodes: 24

Release
- Original network: Tokyo MX
- Original release: January 12 – September 21, 2021

Season chronology
- ← Previous; Season 1 Next → Season 3

That Time I Got Reincarnated as a Slime is an anime television series based on the light novel series of the same title written by Fuse and illustrated by Mitz Vah. The anime is produced by studio Eight Bit. The series follows a man who is killed and reincarnated in another world as a slime named Rimuru. The second season was announced to be split-cour anime, with the first part originally set to premiere in October 2020, but it was instead delayed to January 2021 due to production complications resulting from the COVID-19 pandemic. The second part was also delayed from April to July 2021. The first part aired from January 12 to March 30, 2021, while the second part aired from July 6 to September 21, 2021.

The first opening theme song is "Storyteller" performed by True, while the first ending theme song is "Storyseeker" performed by Stereo Dive Foundation. The second opening theme song is "Like Flames" performed by MindaRyn, while the second ending theme song is "Reincarnate" performed by Takuma Terashima.

== Episodes ==
No. overall	No. in season	Title (Note: English translated titles are taken from Crunchyroll)	Directed by (Note: Production staff information is taken from the ending credits of each episode)	Storyboarded by	Chief animation directed by	Original release date
Part 1
25	1	"Rimuru's Busy Life"; Transliteration: "Rimuru no Isogashii Hibi" (Japanese: リムルの忙しい日々)	Munenori Nawa	Atsushi Nakayama & Ryōma Ebata	Tomoko Ito	January 12, 2021 (Note: Episode 25 and 26 were pre-screened on December 26, 2020 at 7:00 p.m. JST on d Anime Store.)
Rimuru entrusts the children's education to Tiss and returns to Tempest. After being updated on the events that transpired during his absence, Rimuru starts negotiations to establish diplomatic relations with the Kingdom of Eurazania, led by Carrion, by meeting with the Three Beastketeers, which results in Shion fighting one of them.
26	2	"Trade with the Animal Kingdom"; Transliteration: "Jū Ōkoku to no Kōeki" (Japanese: 獣王国との交易)	Daisuke Eguchi	Taizo Yoshida	Keiya Nakano	January 19, 2021
After Rimuru stops Shion's out-of-control attack, the negotiations between Tempest and Eurazania are successful and both countries begin exchanging technologies and establishing trade routes. Sometime later, Rimuru visits Class S and then pays a visit to Gazel in Dwargon, unaware that Clayman is preparing another scheme against him and his nation and sends his spy, who is enslaved with an artificial heart that binds her will to Clayman's, to handle the task.
27	3	"Paradise, Once More"; Transliteration: "Rakuen, Futatabi" (Japanese: 楽園、再び)	Shō Kitamura	Satoshi Shimizu	Hideki Sakai	January 26, 2021
After Rimuru keeps Gazel updated on his recent achievements, they make the alliance between Tempest and Dwargon official. Later, Rimuru and his friends ditch their lady friends to make a stop at a place they visited during their last stay in the kingdom, just to get themselves into trouble.
28	4	"The Scheming Kingdom of Falmuth"; Transliteration: "Bōryaku no Farumusu Ōkoku" (Japanese: 謀略のファルムス王国)	Akira Katō	Masashi Kojima	Yūichi Tanaka	February 2, 2021
Rimuru gives his last lessons to the children of Class S and has Tiss take over for him from now on while Youm returns to Tempest along with his new companion, the magician Mjurran, unaware that she is Clayman's spy, having sent her to Tempest as part of his plan to bring down the monster nation. Rimuru also pays a visit to Gard. Meanwhile, at the Kingdom of Falmuth, the king and his subordinates view Tempest's ascension as a threat to their power and make preparations to invade it, using three otherworlders that they had enslaved as weapons.
29	5	"Prelude to the Disaster"; Transliteration: "Saiyaku no Zensōkyoku" (Japanese: 厄災の前奏曲)	Shunji Yoshida	Taizo Yoshida	Tomoko Ito	February 9, 2021
With Rimuru out of the country, amidst news that Milim is about to launch an attack on Eurazania. Clayman forces Mjurran to summon a barrier that negates all magic power within Tempest and the Kingdom of Falmuth creates another barrier that traps all inhabitants inside to prevent their escape.
30	6	"The Beauty Makes Her Move"; Transliteration: "Ugokidasu Reijin" (Japanese: 動き出す麗人)	Shunsuke Ishikawa	Satoshi Shimizu & Masashi Kojima	Keiya Nakano & Hideki Yamazaki	February 16, 2021
On his way back home, Rimuru is ambushed by Hinata Sakaguchi, a paladin with orders to kill him and is also the mysterious woman from earlier; she also believes that he murdered her mentor Shizu. Rimuru tries reasoning with her, but she refuses to hear anything he has to say and is hellbent on killing him. Hinata proves to be a strong foe as she had placed an anti-magic barrier around them and also has the ability to steal her opponents' skills. Meanwhile, at Tempest, the Falmuth forces invade the country and the citizens fight desperately for their lives.
31	7	"Despair"; Transliteration: "Zetsubō" (Japanese: 絶望)	Munenori Nawa, Daishi Katō & Takahiro Tanaka	Satoshi Shimizu	Yūichi Tanaka, Tomoko Ito & Keiya Nakano	February 23, 2021
Rimuru survives his fight with Hinata by tricking her into defeating a doppelganger so he can escape without her knowing, making her believe she killed him, and returns to Tempest just to find that the city was attacked and many of his subjects were killed, including Shion. He manages to get through the barriers surrounding the city. In preparation for another attack from Falmuth, Rimuru gathers his council and is informed of the situation.
32	8	"Hope"; Transliteration: "Kibō" (Japanese: 希望)	Kazuto Fujiwara	Shinji Itadaki	Yūichi Tanaka, Tomoko Ito & Hideki Sakai	March 2, 2021
Having understood the situation, Rimuru learns that there is a way to resurrect Shion and all the other monsters who were killed in the invasion from Kabal's group. He also learns of Mjurran's motives for working as Clayman's spy while preparing for a full invasion from the Kingdom of Falmuth. Before doing so, he places a third barrier under Mjurran and Falmuth's to keep the souls of the murdered monsters from leaving and frees Mjurran from Clayman's control by replacing her artificial heart with a new one while fooling Clayman into believing that she died. Youm is extremely grateful of this as he has feelings for Mjurran, who in turn decides to help Rimuru. Youm is also tasked by Rimuru to be the new king of Falmuth once he defeats the army.
33	9	"Putting Everything on the Line"; Transliteration: "Subete o Kakete" (Japanese: 全てを賭けて)	Shigeru Fukase	Shinji Itadaki	Hideki Sakai	March 9, 2021
Rimuru reveals his past as a human to the others and together, they begin a plan to deal with the enemy forces while preparing the ritual to revive their lost companions. Rimuru also makes plans to become a Demon Lord.
34	10	"Megiddo"; Transliteration: "Megido" (Japanese: 神之怒(メギド))	Daisuke Eguchi	Satoshi Shimizu	Keiya Nakano & Hideki Sakai	March 16, 2021
Rimuru begins the counterattack on the invading Falmuth forces, sending his subjects to dispel the barrier surrounding the city. In the occasion, they also have their rematch against the three otherworlders and soldiers who attacked the city. Tempest's army proves to be much stronger than Falmuth's, resulting in their barrier being destroyed and two of the otherworlders being slain as Mjurran and Shuna place another barrier around Tempest over the one that Mjurran placed earlier. The last otherworlder is saved by Razen, a majin who works for Falmuth, who is shocked to learn that Rimuru is still alive as all of Falmuth thought he was killed by Hinata. After escaping, Razen kills and takes over the otherworlder's body as Rimuru sends his subordinates back to Tempest so he can begin the next phrase of his attack.
35	11	"Birth of a Demon Lord"; Transliteration: "Maō Tanjō" (Japanese: 魔王誕生)	Shō Kitamura	Satoshi Shimizu	Yūichi Tanaka, Tomoko Ito & Hideki Sakai	March 23, 2021
Rimuru wipes out the entire Falmuth army with a newly obtained skill, except for the king and his subject Reyhiem, to absorb their souls and complete his evolution into a Demon Lord. After a confrontation with the king, Rimuru begins losing his strength and has Ranga take him back to Tempest with the captured king and Reyhiem. His actions summon the Primordial Demon that Shizu and Tiss met before, who then becomes his subordinate. After evolving and gaining new abilities, all while sacrificing one of his previous abilities, Rimuru uses his newfound powers to revive Shion and the rest of his deceased companions, making the barriers disappear in the process. Meanwhile, the Primordial is sent to capture Razen, who also survived Rimuru's attack. Razen fights back, but is unable to defeat the Primordial and is brought back to Tempest. The Primordial also sacrifices his two subordinates to ensure that Rimuru's task succeeds. Once finished, Rimuru collapses from exhaustion.
36	12	"The One Unleashed"; Transliteration: "Tokihanatareshi Mono" (Japanese: 解き放たれし者)	Shunsuke Ishikawa	Satoshi Shimizu	Hideki Sakai, Keiya Nakano, Yūichi Tanaka & Tomoko Ito	March 30, 2021
After recovering from his transformation, Rimuru is informed that the Kingdom of Eurazania was destroyed and Carrion defeated by Milim with assistance from Frey, but the citizens had safely taken refuge in Tempest. On the occasion, Rimuru also learns of Clayman's possible involvement in Milim and Frey's actions and sends Souei and Souka to investigate. The Primordial Demon whom Rimuru summoned officially becomes his subordinate under the name "Diablo" and Rimuru fulfills his promise to Veldora by releasing his seal and giving him a new body.
Part 2
37	13	"The Visitors"; Transliteration: "Otozureru Mono-tachi" (Japanese: 訪れる者たち)	Atsushi Nakayama	Satoshi Shimizu	N/A	July 6, 2021 (Note: This episode was pre-screened on July 5, 2021 on d Anime Store.)
The citizens of Tempest welcome Rimuru and Veldora back and they have a huge celebration together. Afterwards, Rimuru, his subordinates and his allies gather to discuss their next moves given the recent events. Dwargon and the newly allied Sorcerer Dynasty Sarion later arrive to take part in the meeting.
38	14	"A Meeting of Humans and Monsters"; Transliteration: "Jinma Kaidan" (Japanese: 人魔会談)	Ken Sanuma	Shinji Itadaki	Tomoko Ito	July 13, 2021
Laplace is chased out of the Holy Western Empire after being caught. It is revealed that he and the rest of the Moderate Harlequin Alliance are working for Yuuki, who schemes to take over the world for his own means and has been manipulating the recent events, including the Orc Army and Falmuth's invasion. Yuuki also introduces the Alliance's leader, Kagali. Laplace then proposes the idea to have Walpurgis, a special meeting for Demon Lords, in hopes that they can deal with Rimuru. Meanwhile, the representatives of Tempest and their allied nations hold a meeting to deal with Rimuru's ascension as a Demon Lord, Veldora's resurrection, Hinata's motives, and Clayman's interference among other subjects. On the occasion, Rimuru realizes that their recent predicaments are orchestrated by Yuuki, but has not still discovered his true intentions. To keep the public opinion of Tempest neutral, Dwargon, Blumund, and Sarion agree to lie that Veldora awoke in response to Falmuth's invasion and wiped out the enemy, then the newly awoken Demon Lord Rimuru "tamed" him. As Rimuru explains his plan to everyone, Ramiris then arrives and warns Rimuru that Tempest is doomed.
39	15	"Ramiris's Warning"; Transliteration: "Ramirisu no Shirase" (Japanese: ラミリスの報せ)	Ryōsuke Azuma	Masashi Kojima	Hideki Sakai, Keiya Nakano & Tomoko Ito	July 20, 2021
Rimuru calms Ramiris down and has Veldora watch over her. After the conference ends with Tempest strengthening their ties with their allied nations and Youm's endorsement as the future king of Falmuth with Mjurran by his side, Rimuru and his friends turn their attention to their imminent confrontation with Clayman, who is making preparations for the upcoming Walpurgis. Rimuru announces his plan to back Youm as the new king of Falmuth. After hearing this, Gazel tests Youm to see if he has what it takes to be a ruler, and Youm answers with full sincerity. Erald also takes a liking to Rimuru after hearing him say he just wants to create a world where everyone can prosper and smile. Meanwhile, Clayman learns that the attack on Tempest was a failure and believes that Mjurran was killed, but doesn't know that he had been duped by Rimuru. After telling this to Laplace, he warns Clayman about his recklessness and overconfidence before leaving.
40	16	"The Congress Dances"; Transliteration: "Kaigi wa Odoru" (Japanese: 会議は踊る)	Ryō Nakamura	Masashi Kojima	Keiya Nakano, Yūichi Tanaka, Hideki Yamazaki, Hideki Sakai & Masahiko Komino	July 27, 2021
Shortly after the meeting is over, Ramiris, who has taken a liking to manga, warns Rimuru about Walpurgis and Clayman's motive, to which Rimuru reveals that Mjurran is still alive after she was told of her murder by Clayman. Rimuru and his allies discuses Falmuth and the Western Holy Church's motives and look ahead to the battle against their new enemy: Clayman. Mjurran tells Rimuru about the Five Fingers, five powerful individuals who were enslaved by Clayman, and that she was one of them, just as Souei and Souka arrive with news about Clayman.
41	17	"The Eve of Battle"; Transliteration: "Kaisen Zen'ya" (Japanese: 会戦前夜)	Kazuto Fujiwara	Satoshi Shimizu	Keiya Nakano, Yūichi Tanaka, Hideki Yamazaki, Hideki Sakai & Masahiko Komino	August 3, 2021
Rimuru prepares for a battle with Clayman, but observing the enemy army's movements reveals that Clayman's target is not Tempest, but Eurazania. In Eurazania, to rescue the people in opposition of Clayman's army, Rimuru receives advice from Raphael, in addition the plan to subdue Clayman is a suggestion from a secretary. Meanwhile, the Dragon Faithful, a powerful group who reside in Milim's domain, are approached by Yamza, a member of the Five Fingers who is not enslaved like the others, who requests for their help in the fight against Rimuru's nation. Rimuru then teleports his army to the battlefield.
42	18	"The Demon Lords"; Transliteration: "Maō-tachi" (Japanese: 魔王たち)	Ken Sanuma	Satoshi Shimizu	Tomoko Ito	August 10, 2021
Clayman learns of Veldora's revival and considers making him a subordinate, but is unaware of Rimuru's deception. After Benimaru and his army depart, Youm and co. set off for Falmuth, Diablo in tow. Rimuru brimming with positivity begins preparation for Walpurgis. Meanwhile, it is revealed that sometime earlier, Milim has been brainwashed by Frey and Clayman with a mind controlling necklace, who plans to use her for his own means, explaining her earlier actions. Demon Lord Leon visits the residence of fellow Demon Lord, Guy Crimson. They discuss Walpurgis, the actions of other Demon Lords, and the revival of the Storm Dragon. At this point, Velzard, the older sister of Veldora joins the discussion and expresses her interest in the topic. Leon informs them of the story going around about Veldora's seal being undone by the blood of the Falmuth soldiers, but Guy and Velzard were skeptical about this. Leon, too, is of the same opinion and shared his theory that Veldora's seal was dismantled by Rimuru. Guy takes the theory at face value and muses that Rimuru would have to be a demon lord to accomplish that. After a bit more talking, Leon departs, leaving just Guy and Velzard behind. Guy offers Velzard a spot in Walpurgis but she rejects it, saying she's not interested, and leaves. Guy reflects on the contents of the discussion, excited for Walpurgis.
43	19	"The Signal to Begin the Banquet"; Transliteration: "Kaien no Aizu" (Japanese: 開宴の合図)	Munenori Nawa	Taizo Yoshida	Keiya Nakano, Hideki Sakai, Yūichi Tanaka, Hideki Yamazaki & Masahiko Komino	August 17, 2021
Rimuru continues with preparations for Walpurgis, including making Treyni evolve into a Dryas Doll Dryad. Meanwhile, Benimaru and his forces his have arrived in Eurazania via transport magic, and they promptly run Clayman's army into a trap set by Geld. The Three Beastketeers, determined to rescue Carrion, set out to subdue the enemy army's leader. Beastketeer Albis fights Yamza with some help from Rimuru's minions, while Phobio and Geld go to confront Footman and Tear.
44	20	"On This Land Where It All Happened"; Transliteration: "Innen no Chi de" (Japanese: 因縁の地で)	Shō Kitamura	Masashi Kojima	Keiya Nakano, Hideki Sakai, Yūichi Tanaka, Hideki Yamazaki & Masahiko Komino	August 24, 2021
The main forces of Tempest attack Clayman's army. While Beastketeer Suphia and Gabiru lead their comrades against the Dragon Faithful, Albis manages to defeat Yamza. When he tries to surrender to save his life, Clayman remotely forces him to swallow a piece of Charybdis and turn into a mindless, weaker version of the monster. After Yamza is brought down by Benimaru, Tempest makes peace with the Dragon Faithful. Meanwhile, Phobio and Geld are outmatched by Footman and Tear; however, they are spared since the clowns were not told to eliminate them. This however gives Rimuru's army the advantage.
45	21	"Adalmann, the Index Finger"; Transliteration: "Jishi no Adaruman" (Japanese: 示指のアダルマン)	Shigeru Fukase	Satoshi Shimizu	Hideki Sakai, Keiya Nakano, Hideki Yamazaki, Yūichi Tanaka, Masahiko Komino & Yasuhito Kikuchi	August 31, 2021
Rimuru heads to Walpurgis with Shion and Ranga, while Ramiris is joined by Beretta and Treyni. Shuna, Hakuro and Souei journey to the Puppet Kingdom of Justin, Clayman's domain; while Benimaru and the Beastketeers handle the main forces in Milim's domain. They encounter undead led by a wight named Adalmann, another member of the Five Fingers, who was cursed to guard the land by Clayman. Seeing Adalmann wears the remains of a priest's robes, Shuna shows him that even monsters can wield holy magic; demonstrating by creating a barrier for them to fight in. Adalmann is impressed, asking for the god she worships; Shuna explains her magic is a manifestation of her great respect for someone. As Shuna's magic purifies the land, only the binding curse breaks. Adalmann, wishing to serve Shuna's master, pledges his and the undead army's loyalty to Rimuru. Shuna internally bemoans Adalmann is just like Diablo - fanatic.
46	22	"Demon Lords' Banquet: Walpurgis"; Transliteration: "Maō-tachi no Utage ～Warupurugisu～" (Japanese: 魔王達の宴 〜ワルプルギス〜)	Takahiro Enokida	Satoshi Shimizu	Tomoko Ito & Hideki Yamazaki	September 7, 2021
Once Walpurgis begins, Clayman presents his false story of how Carrion encouraged Rimuru to become a Demon Lord and set up the Harvest Festival for him by influencing Falmouth to attack Tempest and used Veldora's revival as a way to evolve into a Demon Lord; the brainwashed Milim and Frey only helped punish Carrion for creating a Demon Lord without majority consent of the existing Demon Lords, and Clayman calls for them to destroy Rimuru in response to this. Rimuru calls him out on all the lies, revealing that Mjurran is still alive as a witness (which Clayman refuses to believe) and Tempest's forces have collected more than enough evidence tying Clayman into the manipulation of Falmuth. Head of the Demon Lord council, Guy Crimson, tells them to fight it out; he wants the matter resolved simply and quickly. Clayman has Milim fight with his subordinates, leaving Rimuru's side unbalanced. Beretta joins the fight on Ramiris' behalf. Right before Milim can punch Rimuru, Veldora suddenly appears and takes the hit.
47	23	"Returning from the Brink"; Transliteration: "Kishikaisei" (Japanese: 起死回生)	Munenori Nawa	Satoshi Shimizu	Hideki Sakai, Tomoko Ito, Keiya Nakano, Hideki Yamazaki, Yūichi Tanaka, Yasuhito Kikuchi & Masahiko Komino	September 14, 2021
Turns out Veldora came to pester Rimuru for more manga. Rimuru has him play with Milim, with the otaku dragon calling out attack names from Street Fighter and Dragon Ball. Beretta takes out Viola, the puppet that Clayman summoned, while Rimuru frees the fox demon (another member of the Five Fingers) that was under Clayman's control and puts it in Ranga's care. Clayman, in the meantime, finally snaps and loses his composure, transforming into his Crazed Clown form. When Clayman orders Milim to use her Stampede form to take out Rimuru and his allies, she turns on him and reveals that she was never brainwashed and was faking it the whole time (the mind controlling necklace that Clayman used on her had no effect), much to Rimuru's surprise and Clayman's anger; Veldora and some of the Demon Lords suspected this earlier while Frey knew about this the whole time and was never on Clayman's side. His weakness and plots are exposed with his defeat by Shion and Carrion reveals himself to be alive and is disguised as one of Frey's attendants; his death was faked to trick Clayman. Even after being defeated, Clayman refuses to reveal the name of his benefactor, but a flashback reveals that he is working for Yuuki. In utter despair at his own weakness, Clayman begs for power, undergoing a pseudo awakening.
48	24	"Octagram"; Transliteration: "Okutaguramu" (Japanese: 八星魔王(オクタグラム))	Daisuke Eguchi	Satoshi Shimizu	Hideki Sakai, Tomoko Ito, Hideki Yamazaki, Keiya Nakano, Yūichi Tanaka & Masahiko Komino	September 21, 2021
Crazed and half awoke as a True Demon Lord, Clayman plans to kill Rimuru to keep his title. However, Rimuru simply pummels and devours Clayman instead; learning the Moderate Harlequin Alliance works for former Demon Lord Kazeream, whose body Leon killed to take his spot, but was reincarnated as Kagali by Yuuki. Thanks to Veldora and Milim's blunder, Demon Lord Roy Valentine is revealed to be a stand-in for true Demon Lord Luminous Valentine, who is the maid Rimuru had suspicions about earlier. This forces Luminous to remove her disguise and send Roy back to her domain to deal with the intruder lurking there while expressing annoyance at Veldora for blowing her cover. Carrion and Frey give up their seats as Demon Lords upon seeing they are too weak; while still ruling their lands, they now work for Milim, though she isn't happy with this. As the group is down to eight members, Guy suggests that Rimuru should pick their new name. Rimuru sees stars above the meeting and decides to call them the Eight Star Demons Lords - Octagram. In the Holy Empire, Laplace (the intruder that Luminous mentioned) is chased off by Hinata; having believed the Demon Lord's absence meant a lack of security. Roy returns early from Walpugus as Luminous felt unease, confronting him. Laplace learns that Clayman was killed and promptly tears out Roy's heart after hearing his dear friend insulted. The anguished clown can only laugh hysterically as he crushes the heart, killing Roy.

== Recap specials ==
No. overall	No. in season	Title	Directed by (Note: Production staff information is taken from the ending credits of each recap special)	Storyboarded by	Chief animation directed by	Original release date
24.9	0	"Digression: Hinata Sakaguchi"; Transliteration: "Kanwa: Hinata・Sakaguchi" (Japanese: 閑話：ヒナタ・サカグチ)	Atsushi Nakayama & Tomotaka Kawabe	Atsushi Nakayama	Kenichirō Katsura	January 5, 2021
The Chief Knight of the Holy Emperor's Imperial Guard of Holy Empire of Lubelius and the Captain of the Western Holy Church's Crusaders, Hinata Sakaguchi receives a letter from an eastern merchant. In it, she reads about the kingdom of monsters; the Jura Tempest Federation, and its shocking facts. As a former student of Shizu, just what could Hinata be thinking about Rimuru? Here we will look back on Rimuru's story as we enter the new turbulent chapter.
36.5	12.5	"Tales: Veldora's Journal 2"; Transliteration: "Kanwa: Verudora Nikki Ni" (Japanese: 閑話：ヴェルドラ日記2)	Atsushi Nakayama & Tomotaka Kawabe	Atsushi Nakayama	N/A	June 29, 2021
While inside Rimuru's stomach, Veldora discusses with Ifrit about the recent developments in the Jura Forest.

== International broadcast ==
The series is available on Crunchyroll and Hulu with both English sub and dub. The series is also available with multilingual subtitles on iQIYI in South East Asia and Taiwan. Muse Communication also streams the episodes on its YouTube channel.
