= That Time I Got Reincarnated as a Slime =

Japanese light novel series and its franchise

- First light novel volume cover, featuring Shizue (right), Ranga (left), Gobta (top left), and Rimuru (front)

転生したらスライムだった件 (Tensei Shitara slime Datta Ken)
- Genre: Isekai
- Novel series
- Written by: Fuse
- Published by: Shōsetsuka ni Narō
- Original run: February 20, 2013 – January 1, 2016
Further information
Light novel
Written by	Fuse
Illustrated by	Mitz Vah
Published by	Micro Magazine
English publisher	NA: Yen Press
Imprint	GC Novels
Original run	May 30, 2014 – November 29, 2025
Volumes	23 + 2 extra
Manga
Written by	Fuse
Illustrated by	Taiki Kawakami
Published by	Kodansha
English publisher	NA: Kodansha USA
Magazine	Monthly Shōnen Sirius
Original run	March 26, 2015 – present
Volumes	33
Manga
That Time I Got Reincarnated as a Slime: The Ways of the Monster Nation
Written by	Fuse
Illustrated by	Shō Okagiri
Published by	Micro Magazine
English publisher	NA: Yen Press
Magazine	Comic Ride
Original run	July 28, 2016 – March 1, 2021
Volumes	8
Manga
The Slime Diaries: That Time I Got Reincarnated as a Slime
Written by	Fuse
Illustrated by	Shiba
Published by	Kodansha
English publisher	NA: Kodansha USA
Magazine	Monthly Shōnen Sirius
Original run	March 2018 – present
Volumes	7
Manga
That Time I Got Reincarnated (Again!) as a Workaholic Slime
Written by	Fuse
Illustrated by	Shizuku Akechi
Published by	Kodansha
English publisher	NA: Kodansha USA
Magazine	Suiyōbi no Sirius
Original run	September 26, 2018 – January 22, 2020
Volumes	2
Manga
That Time I Got Reincarnated as a Slime: Trinity in Tempest
Written by	Fuse
Illustrated by	Tae Tono
Published by	Kodansha
English publisher	NA: Kodansha USA
Magazine	Suiyōbi no Sirius
Original run	March 14, 2019 – present
Volumes	13
Manga
That Time I Got Reincarnated as a Slime: Clayman's Revenge
Written by	Fuse
Illustrated by	Wataru Kajika
Published by	Kodansha
English publisher	Kodansha (digital)
Magazine	Monthly Shōnen Sirius
Original run	April 26, 2022 – present
Volumes	9
Novel series
Toaru Kyūka no Sigoshi-kata
Written by	Fuse
Published by	Shōsetsuka ni Narō
Original run	February 20, 2023 – present
Manga
That Time I Got Reincarnated as a Slime: Gourmet Legend: Peko and Rimuru's Cooking Notebook
Written by	Fuse
Illustrated by	Chika Nakatani
Published by	Kodansha
Magazine	Monthly Shōnen Sirius
Original run	April 26, 2023 – present
Volumes	1
Manga
Toaru Kyūka no Sigoshi-kata
Written by	Fuse
Illustrated by	Yuzo Takada
Published by	Kodansha
Magazine	Monthly Shōnen Sirius
Original run	July 26, 2023 – May 26, 2025
Volumes	4
Anime television series
That Time I Got Reincarnated as a Slime (2018–present); The Slime Diaries: That Time I Got Reincarnated as a Slime (2021); That Time I Got Reincarnated as a Slime: Clayman's Revenge (2027)
Anime film
That Time I Got Reincarnated as a Slime the Movie: Scarlet Bond (2022); That Time I Got Reincarnated as a Slime the Movie: Tears of the Azure Sea (2026)
- icon

That Time I Got Reincarnated as a Slime (Japanese: 転生したらスライムだった件, Hepburn: Tensei Shitara Suraimu Datta Ken; lit. 'The Story of My Reincarnation as a Slime'), also known as Regarding Reincarnated to Slime (Note: This Engrish title is seen on the cover of the Japanese version of the light novel.) and by the contraction TenSura (転スラ), is a Japanese fantasy light novel series written by Fuse, and illustrated by Mitz Vah. The story follows Satoru Mikami, a salaryman who is murdered and then reincarnated in a sword and sorcery world as the titular slime Rimuru Tempest, who goes on to gather allies to build its own nation of monsters.

It was serialized online from 2013 to 2016 on the user-generated novel publishing website Shōsetsuka ni Narō. It was later acquired by Micro Magazine, who published the story as a series of light novels from 2014 to 2025 for twenty-three volumes. The light novels have been licensed in North America by Yen Press, which published the first volume in December 2017. It has received a manga adaptation published by Kodansha along with five manga spin-offs published, by Micro Magazine and Kodansha, respectively. It has received an anime television series adaptation, produced by Eight Bit, which aired from October 2018 to March 2019. A second season of the anime series aired from January to September 2021, and an anime adaptation of the second spin-off manga aired from April to June 2021. An anime film was released in November 2022. A three-episode (ONA) original net animation spin-off, titled Visions of Coleus was released in November 2023. A third season aired from April to September 2024. A fourth season premiered in April 2026. A second film was released in February 2026. An anime adaptation of the sixth spin-off manga is set to premiere in April 2027.

== Plot ==
Satoru Mikami is an ordinary 37-year-old corporate worker living in Tokyo. He is almost content with his monotonous life, despite the fact that he does not have a girlfriend. During a casual encounter with his colleague, an assailant tries to stab his friend, and Satoru pushes his friend out of the way and gets stabbed instead. While succumbing to his injuries, a mysterious voice echoes in his mind and asks a series of questions. In response to Satoru's answers, the voice grants him various gifts and powers to use in his next life.

After regaining consciousness, Satoru discovers that he has been reincarnated as a Slime in an unfamiliar world. At the same time, he also acquires newfound skills, particularly the ability called "Predator," which allows them to devour anything and mimic its appearance and skills. He stumbles upon Veldora, a powerful 'Storm Dragon' who has been sealed for the last 300 years for reducing a town to ashes. Feeling sorry for him, Satoru befriends the dragon, promising to help him in destroying the seal. He decides to exchange names, Veldora bestows upon them the name Rimuru, and he receives the surname Tempest in return. Rimuru then consumes the dragon together with his prison in order to analyze the spell and eventually free Veldora. During their journey, he gains a human form after devouring a deceased human named Shizue Izawa.

The disappearance of Veldora's aura creates a power vacuum, which eventually makes Rimuru the leader of all beings inhabiting the Great Forest of Jura, who accept them as a ruler and together, they establish the nation of Tempest. With Rimuru's strength, wisdom, and idealistic vision, the new nation quickly grows in strength and influence. Soon Rimuru and their subjects draw the attention of nearby foreign powers, from monarchs and legendary heroes to demon lords, some seeking to become their allies, others intending to take advantage of or destroy them completely.

== Media ==
=== Light novels ===
Fuse originally serialized the series as a web novel on the user-generated content site Shōsetsuka ni Narō between February 20, 2013, and January 1, 2016. The series was acquired for print publication by Micro Magazine, which published the first light novel, with illustrations by Mitz Vah, under their GC Novels in May 2014. On April 15, 2017, English publisher Yen Press announced during their panel at Sakura-Con that they had licensed the series for release in North America.

A spin-off web novel series set between the ninth and tenth volumes of the light novel, titled Toaru Kyūka no Sugoshi-kata (How to Spend a Certain Holiday), began serialization on Shōsetsuka ni Narō on February 20, 2023.

=== Manga ===
Taiki Kawakami launched a manga adaptation in Kodansha's shōnen manga magazine Monthly Shōnen Sirius on March 26, 2015. Kodansha USA announced their license to the manga during their panel at New York Comic Con on October 6, 2016.

A spin-off manga, titled That Time I Got Reincarnated as a Slime: The Ways of the Monster Nation (転生したらスライムだった件～魔物の国の歩き方～, Tensei Shitara Suraimu Datta Ken Mamono no Arukikata), with art by Shō Okagiri, was serialized in Micro Magazine's Comic Ride web magazine between July 28, 2016, and March 1, 2021. The series was later cancelled due to the poor health of the artist.

A second spin-off manga, titled The Slime Diaries: That Time I Got Reincarnated as a Slime (転スラ日記 転生したらスライムだった件, Tensura Nikki Tensei Shitara Suraimu Datta Ken), with art by Shiba, has been serialized in Kodansha's shōnen manga magazine Monthly Shōnen Sirius since March 2018, compiled into seven volumes as of January 2024, and licensed in English by Kodansha USA.

A third spin-off manga, titled That Time I Got Reincarnated (Again!) as a Workaholic Slime (転生しても社畜だった件, Tensei Shitara Shachiku Datta Ken) and illustrated by Shizuku Akechi began serialization in Kodansha's Niconico-based Suiyōbi no Sirius manga web platform on September 26, 2018, and has been compiled into two volumes as of March 27, 2020. On June 3, 2020, Kodansha USA announced that it has licensed That Time I Got Reincarnated (Again!) as a Workaholic Slime.

A fourth spin-off manga, titled Tensei Shitara Slime datta Ken Ibun - Makoku Gurashi no Trinity (転生したらスライムだった件 異聞 ～魔国暮らしのトリニティ～), with art by Tae Tono began serialization in Suiyōbi no Sirius on March 14, 2019. On March 18, 2020, Kodansha USA announced their license to the manga for a print release under the title That Time I Got Reincarnated as a Slime: Trinity in Tempest.

A fifth spin-off, a yonkoma titled Tenchura! Tensei Shitara Slime Datta Ken (転ちゅら！ 転生したらスライムだった件), with art by Chacha, began serialization in Monthly Shōnen Sirius on February 26, 2019. This story differs from the main one after Rimuru's encounter with Shizu, when they learn how to mimic a human body. However, the body they create is that of a three-year-old.

A sixth spin-off manga centered around Demon Lord Clayman, titled Tensei Shitara Slime Datta Ken: Clayman Revenge (転生したらスライムだった件クレイマンREVENGE) (That Time I Got Reincarnated as a Slime: Clayman's Revenge), with art by Wataru Kajika began serialization in Monthly Shōnen Sirius on April 26, 2022.

A seventh spin-off manga, titled That Time I Got Reincarnated as a Slime: Gourmet Legend: Peko and Rimuru's Cooking Notebook, with art by Chika Nakatani began serialization in Monthly Shōnen Sirius on April 26, 2023.

A manga adaptation of the Toaru Kyūka no Sigoshi-kata web novel illustrated by Yuzo Takada began serialization in Monthly Shōnen Sirius on July 26, 2023. The manga is set to end serialization on May 26, 2025.

=== Anime series and films ===
An anime television series adaptation produced by Eight Bit and directed by Yasuhito Kikuchi, was broadcast from October 2, 2018, to March 19, 2019, on Tokyo MX and other networks. (Note: Tokyo MX listed the broadcast times as Monday nights at 24:00, meaning the first broadcast technically occurred on Tuesday at midnight JST.) A second season was announced to be a split-season anime; the first half aired from January 12 to March 30, 2021, and the second half aired from July 6 to September 21, 2021. A third season aired from April 5 to September 27, 2024, on the Friday Anime Night programming block on Nippon TV and its affiliates, as well as BS11. The fourth season is set to premiere 5 cours, with the first 2 cours premiering from April 3 to September 25, 2026. The third cour is scheduled to premiere in July 2027. The fourth and fifth cours have no release dates yet.

The first anime film, titled That Time I Got Reincarnated as a Slime the Movie: Scarlet Bond, premiered in Japan on November 25, 2022. The second anime film, entitled Tears of the Azure Sea, premiered on February 27, 2026.

A spin-off anime series based on the Slime Diaries: That Time I Got Reincarnated as a Slime manga aired from April 6 to June 22, 2021.

A second spin-off anime series based on the That Time I Got Reincarnated as a Slime: Clayman's Revenge manga is set to premiere in April 2027.

=== Video games ===
At the AnimeJapan 2021 special stage for the franchise, a free-to-play role-playing game app, titled Tensei Shitara Slime Datta Ken: Maō to Ryū no Kenkoku-tan (That Time I Got Reincarnated as a Slime: The Saga of How the Demon Lord and Dragon Founded a Nation), was announced. It is developed by Bandai Namco Entertainment and was released in 2021. The game was released in English under the title That Time I Got Reincarnated as a Slime: ISEKAI Memories.

In August 2024 another game, That Time I Got Reincarnated as a Slime ISEKAI CHRONICLES, was released.

The mobile game The Seven Deadly Sins: Grand Cross had a crossover event where some of the characters of the series could be obtained for a limited time. A similar event occurred in the Japanese version of the mobile game Yo-kai Watch: Wibble Wobble.

== Reception ==
The light novel series had over 4.5 million volumes in print by October 2018. It was the fifth best-selling title of 2018 with 539,277 light novel sales, and its manga adaptation was the ninth best-selling title of 2018 with 3,460,066 copies. It also became the first manga series based on a light novel with at least 20 million total copies in print. By March 2021, it had over 24 million copies in circulation. In May 2021 it reached 25 million. In January 2022, it had over 30 million copies in circulation. In February 2023, it had 40 million copies in circulation, with 35 million copies in Japan and 5 million copies overseas. The 31th volume of the manga adaptation was the tenth best-selling manga volume of the first half of 2026, with 345,330 copies sold. In the Billboard Japan Hot Manga 2026—which ranks the top manga of the year—volumes 31 and 32 placed 16th and 20th, respectively.

=== Awards and accolades ===
The light novel ranked eighth in 2017 in Takarajimasha's annual light novel guide book Kono Light Novel ga Sugoi!, in the tankōbon category; it ranked sixth in 2018; and fifth in 2019.

In 2017, the manga adaptation was ranked fifth at the third Next Manga Awards in the print category. The manga adaptation (along with its light novels) also won the 2018 BookWalker Award. It was nominated for the 45th Kodansha Manga Award in the shōnen category in 2021; it won the 46th edition in the same category in 2022.

== See also ==
- Alderamin on the Sky—Another light novel series whose manga adaptation was illustrated by Taiki Kawakami
