= Eight Bit (studio) =

Japanese animation studio

Eightbit co., Ltd.
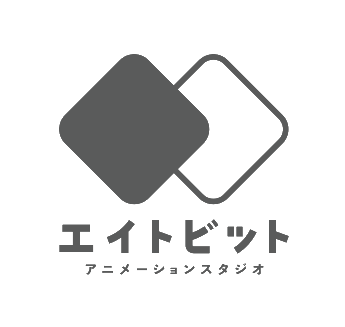
- Native name: 株式会社エイトビット
- Romanized name: Kabushiki-gaisha Eitobitto
- Type: Kabushiki gaisha
- Industry: Japanese animation
- Founded: September 2008; 18 years ago
- Founder: Tsutomu Kasai
- Headquarters: Kamiogi, Suginami, Tokyo, Japan
- Area served: Japan
- Key people: Hirokazu Suyama (president)
- Number of employees: 68 (2021)
- Parent: Bandai Namco Filmworks (2024–present)
- Divisions: Niigata Studio (Note: Niigata Eightbit (新潟エイトビット), the studio's Niigata branch established in November 2021.)
- Website: 8bit-studio.co.jp

Eightbit co., Ltd. (Japanese: 株式会社エイトビット, Hepburn: Kabushiki-gaisha Eitobitto), also known as Animation Studio Eightbit or 8bit for short, is a Japanese animation studio established in September 2008 by former Satelight members.

On June 8, 2020, it was announced that Eight Bit had entered a partnership with Bandai Namco Arts to create multiple anime productions. Their first project was Season 2 of The Slime Diaries: That Time I Got Reincarnated as a Slime.

On November 1, 2021, Eight Bit opened a new studio in the Niigata Prefecture.

On April 1, 2024, Eight Bit became a wholly owned subsidiary of Bandai Namco Filmworks.

== Works ==
=== Television series ===
Title	Director(s)	First run start date	First run end date	Broadcast network(s)	Eps	Note(s)	Ref(s)
Infinite Stratos	Yasuhito Kikuchi	January 7, 2011	April 1, 2011	TBS	12	Adaptation of the light novel series written by Izuru Yumizuru.	
Aquarion Evol	Shōji Kawamori (Note: Credited as Chief Director (総監督, Sō Kantoku).); Yusuke Yamamoto	January 8, 2012	June 24, 2012	TV Tokyo	26	Sequel to Genesis of Aquarion. Co-animated with Satelight.	
Busou Shinki	Yasuhito Kikuchi	October 4, 2012	December 20, 2012	TBS	12	Based on the Busou Shinki armored women action-figure toys manufactured by Konami Digital Entertainment.	
Encouragement of Climb	Yusuke Yamamoto	January 3, 2013	December 21, 2022	Tokyo MX	61	Adaptation of the manga series written by Shiro.; Known as Encouragement of Climb: Next Summit for season 4	
Infinite Stratos 2	Shin Tosaka (Note: Credited as Series Director (シリーズディレクター, Shirīzu Direkutā).); Yasuhito Kikuchi	October 4, 2013	December 20, 2013	TBS	12	Sequel to Infinite Stratos.	
Walkure Romanze	Yusuke Yamamoto	October 6, 2013	December 22, 2013	Tokyo MX	12	Adaptation of an adult visual novel by Ricotta.	
Tokyo Ravens	Takaomi Kanasaki	October 9, 2013	March 26, 2014	Tokyo MX	24	Adaptation of the light novel series written by Kōhei Azano.	
The Irregular at Magic High School	Manabu Ono (S1); Risako Yoshida (S2); Jimmy Stone (S3)	April 6, 2014	June 28, 2024	Tokyo MX	52	Based on the novel series of the same name by Tsutomu Satō; Assumed production from Madhouse; Known as The Irregular at Magic High School: Visitor Arc for season 2	
The Fruit of Grisaia	Tensho	October 5, 2014	December 28, 2014	AT-X & Tokyo MX	13	The first adaptation of the adult visual novel trilogy by Front Wing.	
Absolute Duo	Atsushi Nakayama	January 4, 2015	March 22, 2015	AT-X & Tokyo MX	12	Adaptation of the light novel series written by Takumi Hiiragiboshi.	
The Eden of Grisaia	Tensho	April 19, 2015	June 21, 2015	AT-X & Tokyo MX	10	The third adaptation of The Fruit of Grisaia visual novel trilogy.	
Comet Lucifer	Atsushi Nakayama; Yasuhito Kikuchi	October 4, 2015	December 20, 2015	Tokyo MX	12	Original work.	
Shōnen Maid	Yusuke Yamamoto	April 8, 2016	July 1, 2016	TBS	12	Adaptation of the manga series written by Ototachibana.	
Rewrite	Tensho	July 2, 2016	March 25, 2017	Tokyo MX	24	Adaptation of the visual novel developed by Key.	
Knight's & Magic	Yusuke Yamamoto	July 2, 2017	September 24, 2017	AT-X & Tokyo MX	13	Adaptation of the light novel series written by Hisago Amazake-no.	
How to Keep a Mummy	Kaori	January 11, 2018	March 29, 2018	TBS	12	Adaptation of the manga series written by Kakeru Utsugi.	
That Time I Got Reincarnated as a Slime	Yasuhito Kikuchi	October 2, 2018	March 19, 2019	24	Adaptation of the light novel series written by Fuse.		
Stars Align	Kazuki Akane	October 10, 2019	December 26, 2019	12	Original work.		
If My Favorite Pop Idol Made It to the Budokan, I Would Die	Yusuke Yamamoto	January 10, 2020	March 27, 2020	12	Adaptation of the manga series written by Auri Hirao.		
That Time I Got Reincarnated as a Slime Season 2	Atsushi Nakayama	January 12, 2021	September 21, 2021	24	Sequel to That Time I Got Reincarnated as a Slime.		
The Slime Diaries: That Time I Got Reincarnated as a Slime	Yuji Ikuhara	April 6, 2021	June 22, 2021	12	Spin-off to That Time I Got Reincarnated as a Slime.		
Blue Lock	Tetsuaki Watanabe	October 9, 2022	March 25, 2023	24	Adaptation of the manga series written by Muneyuki Kaneshiro.		
Synduality: Noir	Yusuke Yamamoto	July 11, 2023	March 26, 2024	24	Based on a mixed-media project created by Bandai Namco Entertainment, Bandai Namco Filmworks and Bandai Spirits.		
Shy	Masaomi Andō	October 3, 2023	September 24, 2024	24	Adaptation of the manga series written by Bukimi Miki.		
Laid-Back Camp: Season 3	Shin Tosaka	April 4, 2024	June 20, 2024	12	Sequel to Laid-Back Camp: Season 2 by C-Station.		
That Time I Got Reincarnated as a Slime Season 3	Atsushi Nakayama	April 5, 2024	September 27, 2024	24	Sequel to That Time I Got Reincarnated as a Slime Season 2.		
Blue Lock vs. U-20 Japan	Yūji Haibara	October 5, 2024	December 28, 2024	14	Sequel to Blue Lock.		
That Time I Got Reincarnated as a Slime Season 4	Naokatsu Tsuda	April 3, 2026	TBA	60+	Sequel to That Time I Got Reincarnated as a Slime Season 3.		
That Time I Got Reincarnated as a Slime: Clayman's Revenge	Kentarō Sugimoto	April 2027	TBA	TBA	Spin-off to That Time I Got Reincarnated as a Slime.		
Witch and Mercenary	Shinpei Ezaki	April 2027	TBA	TBA	Adaptation of the light novel series written by Kaeru Chōhōkiteki.		
Blue Lock: Neo Egoist League	TBA	TBA	TBA	TBA	Sequel to Blue Lock vs. U-20 Japan.		

=== Films ===
Title	Director(s)	Release date	Note(s)	Ref(s)
Macross Frontier: Itsuwari no Utahime	Shōji Kawamori	November 21, 2009	A film adaptation of Macross Frontier. Co-animated with Satelight.	
The Labyrinth of Grisaia	Tensho	April 12, 2015	The second adaptation of The Fruit of Grisaia visual novel trilogy.	
The Irregular at Magic High School: The Movie – The Girl Who Summons the Stars	Risako Yoshida	June 17, 2017	A film based on an original new storOriginal net animationsers from The Irregular at Magic High School.	
The Irregular at Magic High School: Reminiscence Arc	Risako Yoshida	December 31, 2021	Sequel to The Irregular at Magic High School: Visitor Arc. Co-produced with Eight Bit Niigata.	
That Time I Got Reincarnated as a Slime the Movie: Scarlet Bond	Yasuhito Kikuchi	November 25, 2022	Based on That Time I Got Reincarnated as a Slime.	
Blue Lock: Episode Nagi	Shunsuke Ishikawa	April 19, 2024	A film adaptation of the Blue Lock: Episode Nagi spin-off manga.	
That Time I Got Reincarnated as a Slime the Movie: Tears of the Azure Sea	Yasuhito Kikuchi	February 27, 2026	Based on That Time I Got Reincarnated as a Slime.	
The Irregular at Magic High School: The Movie – Yotsuba Succession Arc	Jimmy Stone	May 8, 2026	Sequel to The Irregular at Magic High School Season 3.	

=== Original video animations ===
Title	Director	Release date	Notes	Ref(s)
IS Encore: A Sextet Yearning for Love	Yasuhito Kikuchi	December 7, 2011	Sequel to IS <Infinite Stratos>.	
Infinite Stratos 2: Long Vacation Edition	Yasuhito Kikuchi; Shin Tosaka	October 30, 2013	An extended version of the second season's first episode.	
Infinite Stratos 2: World Purge	Yasuhito Kikuchi; Shin Tosaka	November 26, 2014		
Encouragement of Climb: Omoide no Present	Yusuke Yamamoto	October 28, 2017		

Title	Director	Release date	Eps	Notes	Ref(s)
Zenonzard The Animation Episode 0		September 10, 2019	1	Anime adaptation to Bandai app game Zenonzard.	
Zenonzard The Animation	Kei Oikawa	January 31, 2020 – October 31, 2020	9		
Sukuwareru Ramiris		March 19, 2022 – July 21, 2022	2	Short animation released for a limited time on Bandai Spirits YouTube channel.	
Coleus no Yume	Atsushi Nakayama	November 2, 2023	3	Side story set after Season 1 of That Time I Got Reincarnated as a Slime.	

== Related Studios ==
- Chiptune (fka 8bit Rocket) - A CGI animation studio established in 2012 before being independent in 2015.
- Pine Jam - A studio founded in 2015 by former producer Kazuyoshi Mukaitouge.
- Studio Bind - A studio founded in 2018 by Egg Firm and White Fox and led by former producer Toshiya Otomo.
- Staple Entertainment - A studio founded in 2020 by former producer Shinya Ueda.
- Soigne - A studio founded in 2023 by former producers Hikaru Murakami and Norikiyo Fujita.
