= Fuse (writer) =

Japanese light novel author

- 伏瀬
- Occupation: Light novel author
- Years active: 2013–present
- Notable work: That Time I Got Reincarnated as a Slime

Fuse (Japanese: 伏瀬, Hepburn: Fuse) is a Japanese light novel writer. He is best known as the creator of the fantasy series That Time I Got Reincarnated as a Slime, which originated as a web novel before being published as a light novel series and adapted into manga, an anime television series, and feature films.

== Early life ==
Fuse has kept most details of his personal life private.

== Career ==
=== Web novel origins ===
In 2013, Fuse began serializing That Time I Got Reincarnated as a Slime on the Japanese web novel platform Shōsetsuka ni Narō, a website that allows users to publish original fiction.

=== Light novel publication ===
The web novel was later acquired by Micro Magazine, which began publishing the series as a light novel under its GC Novels imprint in 2014, with illustrations by Mitz Vah.

The series was licensed for English-language publication by Yen Press.

The light novel series concluded in 2025 with its 23rd volume, completing the main storyline originally established in the web novel format.

=== Manga and anime adaptations ===
Following the success of the light novel series, That Time I Got Reincarnated as a Slime was adapted into multiple manga series. The primary manga adaptation began serialization in Monthly Shōnen Sirius, with Fuse credited for the original story.

An anime television series adaptation produced by Eight Bit premiered in 2018. Subsequent seasons, original video animations, and feature films were released as part of the franchise's expansion.

=== Writing approach ===
In interviews, Fuse has stated that material from the original web novel was revised and expanded during its adaptation into a light novel format, allowing for additional world-building and narrative refinement.

== Works ==
=== Light novels ===
- That Time I Got Reincarnated as a Slime (2014–2025)

=== Manga ===
- That Time I Got Reincarnated as a Slime (original story)
- Various spin-off manga adaptations within the franchise

== Reception ==
That Time I Got Reincarnated as a Slime achieved commercial success following its publication as a light novel and has been cited by industry publications as an example of a web novel transitioning into a large multimedia franchise.
