= Maximianopolis (Palestine) =

Ancient Roman city

Coordinates: 32°35′06″N 35°11′04″E

Maximianopolis (Ancient Greek: Μαξιμιανόπολις) was an ancient city in the Roman province of Syria Palaestina, later in the province of Palaestina Secunda within the Byzantine Empire. The name Maximianopolis ('City of Maximian') was given to it by Diocletian (r. 284–305), in honour of his co-emperor Maximian. It was located 17 M.P. from Caesarea and 10 M.P. from Jezreel.

Legio's name was preserved in that of the nearby former Arab village of Lejjun.

== History ==
=== Bible reference ===
Jerome identified Maximianopolis with the Hadad-rimmon of Zechariah 12:11 –

On that day the mourning in Jerusalem will be as great as the mourning for Hadad-rimmon in the plain of Megiddo

The mention of the Hadad-rimmon mourning may be a reference to pagan worship ceremonies or to an event such as the death of Josiah, mortally wounded in the Battle of Megiddo (609 BC).

=== Episcopal see ===
Maximianopolis in Palaestina was also a seat of a bishop in the province of Palestina II.

In the time of the so-called Pilgrim of Bordeaux and of Jerome, the town already bore the name of Maximianopolis.

The camp of the Legio VI Ferrata was within the same Catholic see, at a place that was known as Legio. In the Latin version of an episcopal Notitia Episcopatuum, probably of the 11th century, the name "Legionum" is given to what in the original Greek text is Maximianopolis. Legio became Lajjun, currently the site of Kibbutz Meggido, closer than Maximianopolis to Megiddo.

Only three of its residential bishops are known:

- Paul, in 325
- Megas, in 518
- Domnus, in 536

=== Titular see ===
The ancient episcopal see is now included, under the name Maximianopolis in Palaestina, in the list of titular sees of the Roman Catholic Church given in the Annuario Pontificio.

- Gaetano Mantegazza, B. † (25 Jun 1778 Appointed – 1793)
- Alexander Cameron † (19 Sep 1797 Appointed – 7 Feb 1828)
- Kajetan von Kowalski † (15 Apr 1833 Appointed – 13 Jan 1840)
- William Walsh † (15 Feb 1842 Appointed – 27 Sep 1844)
- Aleksander Kazimierz Beresniewicz † (27 Sep 1858 Appointed – 30 May 1875)
- Ferdinand Maria Ossi, OCD † (3 Apr 1883 Appointed – 14 Dec 1886)
- John Hutchinson, OSA † (13 May 1887 Appointed – 28 Oct 1897)
- Auguste François Louis Grimault, CSSp † (24 Jan 1927 Appointed – 18 Jun 1980)

== See also ==
- Megiddo church, located in the area of ancient Legio
- Maximianopolis (disambiguation page)
