= P. L. O. Guy =

British archaeologist and soldier (1885–1952)

Philip Langstaffe Ord Guy (23 January 1885 – 7 December 1952) was a British archaeologist, administrator, and British Army officer.

== Career ==
Having served in the First World War, Guy assisted with the excavations at Carchemish in Syria and El Amarna in Egypt. In 1922, he was appointed Chief Inspector of Antiquities in Palestine and began an association with the Holy Land that would last the rest of his life. He served as Director of the Tel Megiddo excavations from 1927 to 1935 succeeding Clarence S. Fisher, and then as Director of the British School of Archaeology in Jerusalem from 1935 to 1939. He innovated the use of balloon photography in archaeology during his excavations at Megiddo. He returned to the British Army during the Second World War, being promoted to lieutenant colonel and serving as a military governor. With the end of the war and the independence of Israel, he remained in the country and joined the newly created Israel Department of Antiquities and Museums.

== Personal life ==
In 1925, Guy married Yemima, the eldest daughter of Eliezer Ben Yehuda, a lexicographer and Zionist responsible in large part for the revival of Hebrew. They had a daughter.

== Selected works ==
- Guy, P L O; Staples, William Ewart (1931). New light from Armageddon; second provisional report (1927-29) on the excavations at Megiddo in Palestine. Chicago, Il: The University of Chicago Press.
- Guy, P.L.O. (June 1932). "Balloon Photography and Archaeological Excavation". Antiquity. 6 (22): 148–155. doi:10.1017/S0003598X00006682.
- Guy, P L O; Engberg, Robert M (1938). Megiddo tombs. Chicago, Il: University of Chicago Press.
