= Tel Megiddo =

Site of an ancient city in northern Israel's Jezreel Valley

- תל מגידו (Hebrew) (Hebrew)
- Tell el-Muteselim (Arabic)
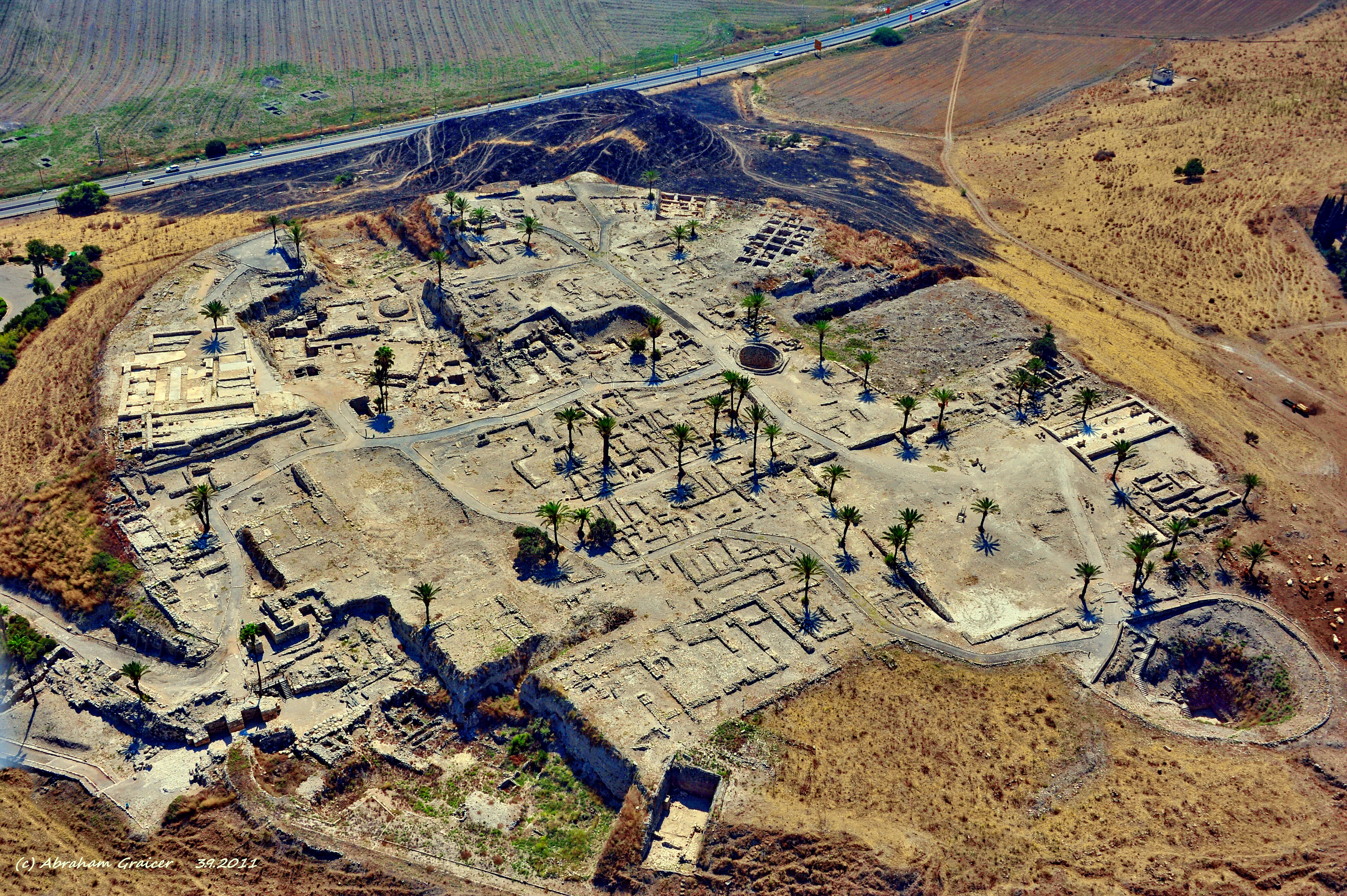
- An aerial view of Tel Megiddo

- Location within Jezreel Valley region of Israel Location within Israel Location within West and Central Asia
- 32°35′07″N 35°11′04″E
- Type: Settlement
- Location: northern end of Wadi Ara toward Jezreel Valley, Israel
- Region: Levant
- Part of: Canaanite city-state (Early to Middle Bronze Age); Egyptian empire (Late Bronze Age); Kingdom of Israel (Iron Age II)

History
- Abandoned: 350 BCE

Site notes
- Public access: yes (national park)
- Website: Tel Megiddo National Park website The Megiddo Expedition website

UNESCO World Heritage Site
- Official name: Biblical Tells – Megiddo, Hazor, Beer Sheba
- Type: Cultural
- Criteria: ii, iii, iv, vi
- Designated: 2005 (29th session)
- Reference no.: 1108
- Region: Asia-Pacific

Tel Megiddo (from Hebrew: תל מגידו; Arabic: تل المتسلم, Tell el-Muteselim) is the site of the ancient city of Megiddo (/məˈɡɪdoʊ/; Hebrew: מגידו; Greek: Μεγιδδώ), the remains of which form a tell or archaeological mound, situated in northern Israel at the western edge of the Jezreel Valley. During the Bronze Age, Megiddo was an important Canaanite city-state, and in the Iron Age, it became a royal city in the Kingdom of Israel. The site is renowned for its historical, geographical, and theological significance, especially under its Greek name Armageddon (Ἁρμαγεδών), which appears once in the Koine Greek New Testament in Revelation 16:16.

Excavations have unearthed 20 strata of ruins since the Neolithic phase, indicating a long settlement period. Occupied continuously from the early Bronze Age (c. 3000 BCE) to the Persian period (c. 332 BCE), Megiddo was strategically located at the crossroads of major ancient trade routes, making it a key center for trade, politics, and military affairs. Excavations have uncovered impressive fortifications, including massive city walls and gates, as well as palaces, temples, residential buildings, and a sophisticated water system. The site is protected as Megiddo National Park and is a UNESCO World Heritage Site.

== Etymology ==
Megiddo was known in the Akkadian language used in Assyria as Magiddu, Magaddu. In Egyptian, it was Maketi, Makitu, and Makedo. In the Canaanite-influenced Akkadian used in the Amarna letters, it was known as Magidda and Makida. Koine Greek: Μαγεδών/Μαγεδδώ, Magedón/Mageddó in the Septuagint; Latin: Mageddo in the Vulgate. Revelation 16:16 describes an apocalyptic battle at Armageddon (Koine Greek: Ἁρμαγεδών, romanized: Harmagedōn, a transliteration of the Hebrew Har Megiddo "Mount Megiddo"). From this appearance in a well-known eschatological text, the term "Armageddon" has come to signify any world-ending catastrophe.

== Location ==
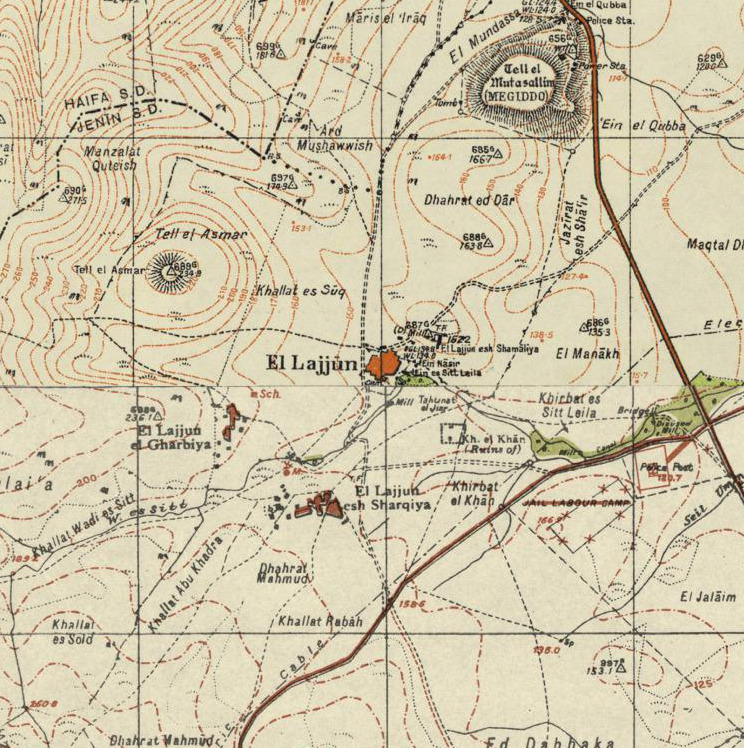
The tell in the 1940s Survey of Palestine, northeast of Lajjun.

The tell is situated about 30 kilometres (19 mi) southeast of Haifa Its strategic location at the northern end of the defile of the Wadi Ara, which acts as a pass through the Carmel Ridge, and its position overlooking the rich Jezreel Valley from the west gave it much of its importance.

The location of the Megiddo was widely debated by scholars throughout the 19th century, using Biblical, Egyptian and classical sources. Marino Sanuto’s map of 1322 CE showed Megiddo adjacent to Zububa. Edward Robinson, in his Biblical Researches in Palestine, identified it with Lajjun, due to its position as an important town, and its being close to the village Ti'inik: “The distance of Taanach from Legio is given by Eusebius and Jerome at three or four Roman miles; and it is somewhat remarkable, that Megiddo is rarely spoken of in Scripture, except in conjunction with Taanach; a circumstance which likewise implies their vicinity to each other... All these circumstances make out a strong case in favour of the identity of Legio and Megiddo; and leave in my own mind little doubt upon the point.” The PEF Survey of Palestine noted the same, but preferred the site of Mujedda near the village of Al-Ashrafiyya, writing that: “The site of Megiddo is generally placed at Lejjûn. The site of Khŭrbet Mujedda, near Beisân, fits well the requirements of the Egyptian accounts, and the Biblical account of the battle of Tabor (Judges iv.), when the kings are said to have fought 'in Taanach by the waters of Megiddo,' and again (Psa. lxxxiii. 9) to have 'perished in Endor.'” They followed with nine pages of various scholars’ debates regarding the location.

The debate over the location of Megiddo was settled in George Adam Smith's The Historical Geography of the Holy Land; the work's final edition explained it as follows:

The excavations which have proved Robinson's theory of the site of Megiddo as only approximately true were those on Tell el-Mutesellem by Schumacher in 1903-5, and recently renewed at Professor Breasted's suggestion by the Oriental Institute of Chicago University. They have shown so far that not Lejjun, but the Tell or Mound about a mile farther north is the ancient Megiddo. A wall has been traced almost all round the Tell with a city gate of well-dressed ashlar, presumed to be the work of Phoenician masons employed by Solomon but bearing some Hittite features. Some debris and ashes above this stratum suggest a destruction of the city. Above all this are two strata with walls mostly of unhewn stone assigned to the period of the N. Israel monarchy; and here was found a cartouche of the Pharaoh Shoshenk, Heb. Shishak or Shoshak, whose record at Karnak of the cities subjected by him includes both Megiddo (Makidu) and Ta'anach. Above those two strata there is nothing that can be dated later than 350 B.c. about which date therefore the inhabitants of Megiddo appear to have removed to a site a mile farther south on the same ridge which the Romans when they came fortified and called Legio.

== History ==
Megiddo was important in the ancient world. It guarded the western branch of a narrow pass on the most important trade route of the ancient Fertile Crescent, linking Egypt with Mesopotamia and Anatolia and known today as Via Maris. Because of its strategic location, Megiddo was the site of several battles. It was inhabited approximately from 5000 to 350 BCE, or even, as Megiddo Expedition archaeologists suggest, since around 7000 BCE.

=== Neolithic ===
==== Yarmukian culture ====
Archaeological Stratum XX at Tel Megiddo began around 5000 BCE during the Neolithic. The first Yarmukian culture remains were found at this level in 1930s excavations, but they were not recognized as such then. These remains, found in Area BB, were pottery, a figurine, and flint items.

=== Chalcolithic ===
==== Wadi Rabah culture ====
The Chalcolithic period came next, with significant content around 4500–3500 BCE, as part of the Wadi Rabah culture, at the following base level of Tel Megiddo, as other large tell sites in the region, was located near a spring.

=== Early Bronze Age ===
==== Early Bronze I ====
Megiddo's Early Bronze Age I (3500–2950 BCE) was originally worked in 1933–1938 by the Oriental Institute, now the Institute for the Study of Ancient Cultures. Decades later, a temple from the end of this period was found and dated to Early Bronze Age IB (ca. 3000 BCE) and described by its excavators, Adams, Finkelstein, and Ussishkin, as "the most monumental single edifice so far uncovered" in the early Bronze Age Levant and among the largest structures of its time in the Near East.

Samples, obtained by Israel Finkelstein's Megiddo Expedition, at the temple-hall in the year 2000, provided calibrated dates from the 31st and 30th century BCE. The temple is the most monumental Early Bronze I structure known in the Levant, if not the entire Ancient Near East. Archaeologists' view is that "taking into account the manpower and administrative work required for its construction, it provides the best manifestation for the first wave of urban life and, probably, city-state formation in the Levant".

To the South of this temple there is an unparalleled monumental compound. It was excavated by the Megiddo Expedition in 1996 and 1998, and belongs to the later phase of Early Bronze IB, ca. 3090–2950 BCE. It consists of several long, parallel stone walls, each of which is 4 meters wide. Between the walls were narrow corridors, filled hip-deep with the remains of animal sacrifice. These walls lie immediately below the huge 'megaron' temples of the Early Bronze III (2700–2300 BCE). The megaron temples remained in use through the Intermediate Bronze period.

Magnetometer research, before the 2006 excavations, found that the entire Tel Megiddo settlement covered an area of ca. 50 hectares, being the largest known Early Bronze Age I site in the Levant. In 2014, the archaeologist Pierre de Miroschedji stated that Tel Megiddo covered around 25 hectares in the Early Bronze IA and IB periods, when most settlements in the region only covered a maximum area of 5 hectares, but that excavations suggest large sites like Tel Megiddo were "sparsely built, with dwellings disorderly distributed and separated by open spaces."

==== Early Bronze II–III ====
Tel Megiddo was still among the large fortified sites, between 5 and 12 hectares, during the Early Bronze II–III period, when its palace testifies that it was a real city-state "characterized by a strong social hierarchy, a hereditary centralized power, and the functioning of a palatial economy."

Stratum XVI (EB IIA-B; 3000-2750 BCE; decline). Stratum XVb (EB IIIA; 2720-2500 BCE; peak economy). Contemporary to the 3rd and 4th dynasties of Egypt. Stratum XVa (EB IIIB; 2500-2350 BCE; drier climate cause intensified centralization and urbanization). Contemporary to the 5th Dynasty of Egypt. The end of Stratum XV is marked by the abandonment of the temples as the economy declines.

==== Early Bronze IV ====
The town declined in the Early Bronze Age IV period (2300–2000 BCE) as the Early Bronze Age political systems collapsed at the last quarter of the third millennium BCE.

Stratum XIVB (EB IVA; 2350-2150 BCE). At the end of this period, the Fall of the Akkadian Empire (c. 2334-2154 BCE) and Fall of the Old Egyptian Kingdom. 4.2 ka event.

Stratum XIVA (EB IVB; 2150-2020/2000 BCE). At the end of this period, the Fall of the Ur III Empire (c. 2112-2004 BCE). End of the Early Bronze Age. 4.0 ka event. The local water source at 'Ain el-Qubbi spring allowed the city to withstand shorter droughts.

=== Middle Bronze Age ===
==== Middle Bronze I ====
Early in the second millennium BCE, at the beginning of the Middle Bronze Age (ca. 1950 BCE), urbanism once again took hold throughout of the southern Levant. Large urban centers served as political power in city-states.

Stratum XIII (MB I) can be subdivided into XIIIB (MB IA; 2020/2000-1900 BCE; semi-rural) and XIIIA (MB IB; 1900-1820 BCE; fortified settlement).

==== Middle Bronze II ====
By the later Middle Bronze Age, the inland valleys were dominated by regional centers such as Megiddo, which reached a size of more than 20 hectares, including the upper and lower cities. A royal burial was found in Tel Megiddo, dating to the later phase of the Middle Bronze Age, around 1700–1600 BCE, when the power of Canaanite Megiddo was at its peak and before the ruling dynasty collapsed under the might of Thutmose's army.

Stratum XII (MB IIA peak economy). In MB IIA the "Nordburg" belongs to Level XII. Compare with the nearby city of Shimron to the north.

Stratum XI (MB IIB-C/MB III/LB IA). In the Southern Levant, the Middle Bronze IIC (c. 1590-1550 BCE) corresponds with Late Bronze IA in the Northern Levant, where Mursili I of the Hittites around 1600 BCE destroyed the Great Kingdom of Yamhad (Aleppo) causing political turmoil.

In mortuary contexts, in a dental calculus of individual MGD018 (c. 1630–1550 BCE), at Tel Megiddo, turmeric and soybean proteins were found, which are South Asian products, suggesting he may have been a merchant or trader who "consumed foods seasoned with turmeric or prepared with soy oil in the Levant, in South Asia, or elsewhere," indicating the possible existence of an Indo-Mediterranean trade. Sesamum protein (sesame), another South Asian product, was found in individual MGD011 (c. 1688–1535 BCE).

=== Late Bronze Age ===
==== Late Bronze IA ====
In Egypt, the New Kingdom began with Ahmose I (r. 1570-1546 hCh) who along with his successors conducted military campaigns into the Southern Levant, destroying or subjugating many of the MB IIC settlements. At Tel Megiddo areas H and K, radiocarbon datings indicate the LBA began in the first half of the 16th century BCE (c. 1585–1545 BCE).

Stratum X (LB IA).

==== Late Bronze IB ====
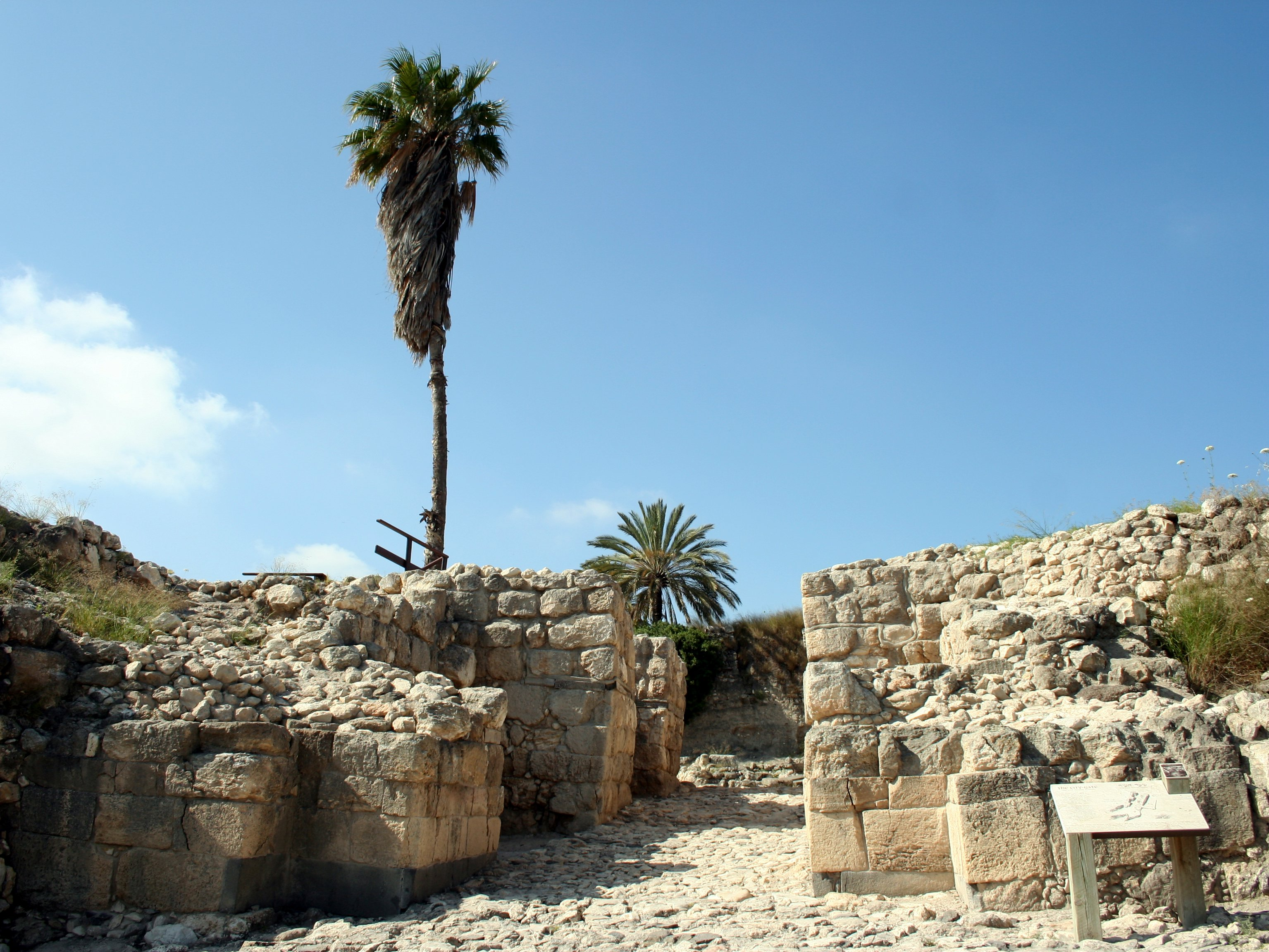
Late Bronze Age city gate

Stratum IX (LB IB). Megiddo Stratum IX "was better protected than it was in the Middle Bronze Age, as the old brick wall was still in use, and houses that created a continuous outer stone wall were constructed on top of it". It was a vassal of the early 18th Dynasty until the reign of Hatshepsut.

At the end of Stratum IX (LB IB/IIA), during the Battle of Megiddo, the city was subjugated by Thutmose III (r. 1479–1425 BCE), and became part of the Egyptian Empire. The city still prospered, and a massive and elaborate government palace was constructed in the Late Bronze Age. Thutmose III's campaign is attested in Stratum IX at Tel Megiddo, a well fortified site in Late Bronze Age I.

==== Late Bronze II – Egyptian period ====
Stratum VIII (LB IIA). Palace. In the Amarna period (c. 1353–1336 BCE), Megiddo was a vassal of the Egyptian Empire.

The Amarna Archive (c. 1350 BC), contains letters from the time of Amenhotep III, Akhenaten and Tutankhamen. Megiddo is mentioned in seven letters (EA 242, 243, 244, 245, 246, 246 and 365). Biridya of Megiddo is mentioned in several letters from Megiddo (EA 242, 243, 244, 246, 247, 365) and from Taanach (EA 248).

The Amarna Letter E245 mentions local ruler Biridiya of Megiddo. Other contemporary rulers mentioned were Labaya of Shechem and Surata of Akka, nearby cities. This ruler is mentioned in the corpus from the city of 'Kumidu', the Kamid al lawz. This indicates that there were relations between Megiddo and Kumidu.

Stratum VIIA (LB IIB). Palace. During the reign of Merneptah, Hazor and several other cities including the Jezreel Valley rebelled against the Egyptians.

Stratum VIIB (LB IIB/Iron IA). Megiddo's Stratum VIIB lasted until slightly before or in the reign of Ramesses III (c. 1184–1153 BCE).

=== Iron Age ===
==== Iron Age I ====
Iron Age I (c. 1150–950 BCE) began in Tel Megiddo around 1150 BCE. Egypt's control of this Canaanite region ended around 1130 BCE, as Stratum VIIA was destroyed around this date or shortly thereafter, attested in the palace and adjacent Level H-11 building. A Canaanite dynasty still controlled the city after the Egyptians abandoned the region.

Stratum VIB (Iron IA; Early Iron I) can be aligned with the late 20th Dynasty of Egypt. The Transitional Iron IA/IB may reflect the end of the Egyptian Empire in the Southern Levant.

Stratum VIA (Iron IB; Late Iron I) correspond with the 21st Dynasty in Egypt. Radiocarbon dating indicate that Philistine Bichrome appeared at Megiddo around 1111-1086 BC (68%) or 1128-1079 BC (95.4%).

The Iron I/II transition saw a fierce conflagration that consumed Stratum VIA. The transition led to the end of the old culture which had lingered since the Late Bronze and the beginning of a new culture forming the Northern Kingdom. Scholars debate the exact timing of this transition.

The city represented by Stratum VI is considered completely Canaanite by Israel Finkelstein. It is thought to have a mixed Canaanite and Philistine character by archaeologists Yigael Yadin and Amihai Mazar (2005). It fell victim to fire, when the earliest fragmentary Gate 3165 from Stratum VIA in the Late Iron Age I (c. 1050–950 BCE) was destroyed along with the whole city at the end of this period, marking the end of Iron I in the Jezreel Valley and of Canaanite culture there. This destruction was "caused by the growing proto-Israelite power in the central hill country, out of which [emerged] the Northern Kingdom of Israel [that] should be dated to the first half of the 10th century BCE," related to "the biblical narrative of the war led by Deborah and Barak in Judges 4–5."

Ben-Dor Evian and Finkelstein (2023), based on an updated Bayesian model and recent radiocarbon datings, proposed that Stratum VIA ended sometime between 999 and 974 BCE, not due to the conquest of Shoshenq I but by "the expansion of the highlanders into the valley, a development that soon brought about the emergence of the Israelite Northern Kingdom." Applying Bayesian model inference (OxCal v.4.4 software), archaeologist Enrique Gil Orduña (2024) considers this destruction took place sometime around 986 to 983 BCE.

==== Iron Age II ====
Stratum V. There have been several contradictory proposals for the political history of the Early Iron Age excavation layers. The destruction of Stratum V was attributed, by Yadin and Mazar, to Shoshenq I, the first pharaoh of the 22nd Dynasty of Egypt, who would have taken Megiddo sometime around 926 BCE, which is attested in a cartouche on a stele fragment, found in a spoil heap of the Shumacher excavation by the Oriental Institute team, and in a partial and damaged list of toponyms at the Temple of Karnak. However, recalibration of radiocarbon datings, using calibration curve (IntCal20), supports Finkelstein's view that the destruction of Stratum V was due to Hazael's campaign, c. 835 BCE (9th century BCE).

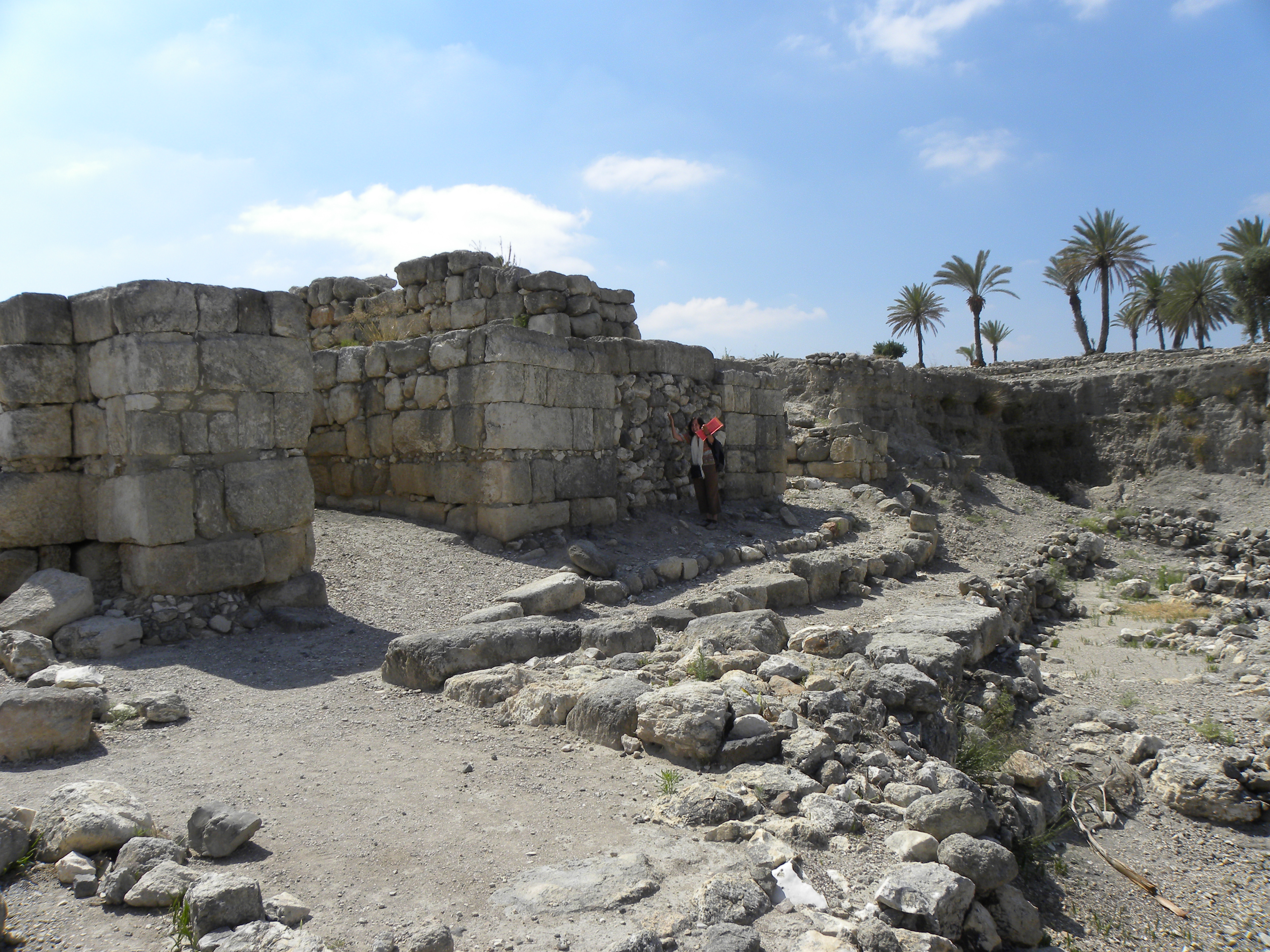
Gate 2156, built by a proto-Israelite power or during the Omride dynasty (Late Iron Age IIA, c. 900–780 BCE).

Rulers of the Israelite Northern Kingdom improved the fortress from around 900 to 750 BCE. The palaces, water systems and fortifications of the site at this period were among the most elaborate Iron Age constructions found in the Levant. There is a putative "Solomonic gate" (Gate 2156), which belongs to Stratum VA-IVB, dated by recent excavations and new radiocarbon analysis by Megiddo Expedition, led by Israel Finkelstein, during the time of the Omrides, (c. 886–835 BCE), in the Late Iron Age IIA (around 900–780 BCE).

Hendrik J. Bruins recalibrated Israel Finkelstein's radiocarbon available samples, using the latest 2020 calibration curve (IntCal20), and concluded that the initial establishment of Stratum VB belongs to the 10th century BC, during the time of the possible United Monarchy, based on two radiocarbon samples. These two samples are RTT-5498 and RTK-6755, dated to 961 cal BC (median) and 928 cal BCE (median) respectively. Four other samples from Stratum VA-IVB, which are RTK-6408, 6760, 6429, and RTT-3948, belong to the period of the Omrides, dated to 865, 858, 858, and 857 cal BCE (median) respectively.

Tel Megiddo became an important city, before being destroyed, possibly by Aramaean raiders. The Aramean occupation was around 845–815 BCE. Jeroboam II (c. 789–748 BCE) reigned over Megiddo.

==== Assyrian period ====
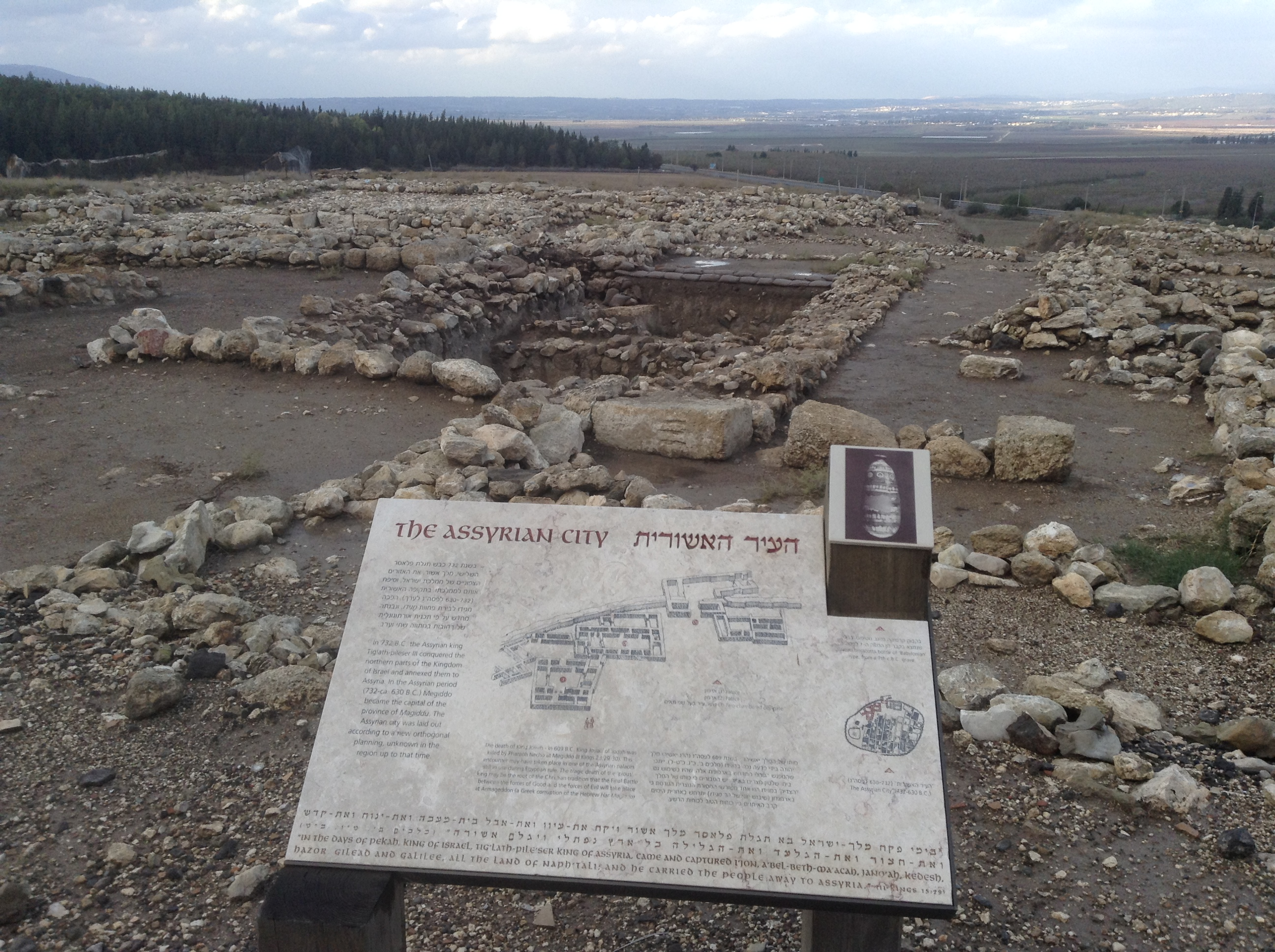
The Assyrian period, when the site was called Magiddu, c. 732–609 BCE – plan and ruins

Tiglath-Pileser III of Assyria conquered Megiddo in 732 BCE, turning it to the capital of the Neo-Assyrian Empire's province of Magiddu. Hoshea (c. 732–721 BCE), the last king of the Israelite Northern Kingdom, was vassal to Tiglath-Pileser III. The site was rebuilt as an administrative center for Tiglath-Pileser III's occupation of Samaria.

==== Egyptian period ====
In 609 BCE, Megiddo was conquered by Egyptians under Necho II, during the Battle of Megiddo.

==== Babylonian period ====
Its importance soon dwindled, and it was thought as finally abandoned around 586 BCE. Since that time it would have remained uninhabited, preserving ruins pre-dating 586 BCE without settlements ever disturbing them. Archaeologist Eric Cline considers that Tel Megiddo came to an end later, around 350 BCE, during Achaemenid times. Then, the town of al-Lajjun, not to be confused with the al-Lajjun archaeological site in Jordan, was built up near to the site, but without inhabiting or disturbing its remains.

=== Roman and Byzantine periods ===
During the Roman and Byzantine periods, while the site was part of the provinces of Syria Palaestina (136-390) and Palaestina Secunda (390-638), there were three settlements in the vicinity of the tell: the Jewish village of Kefar 'Othnay (Caparcotna in Latin or Kaperkotnei in Greek); Legio, the Roman military camp of the Legio VI Ferrata ('6th "Ironclad" Legion'); and later, in the 4th and 5th centuries during Byzantine rule, a polis named Maximianopolis. J. C. Howry, processing the results of a surface reconnaissance survey in 2019 which had used LiDAR (Light Detection and Ranging) technology to obtain enhanced images of the ground, places Maximianopolis northwest of the tell, Legio south-southeast of it, and a village which grew next to the legion camp for which it provided services (the future Arab village of Lejjun), southwest of the tell. Adams, David and Tepper (2014) write that the VIth Legion was deployed to the country sometime between 100 and 132, and was stationed there through most of the 3rd century; Howry (2020) places it at Legio between 192 and 316.

==== Megiddo church ====
The Megiddo church is next to Megiddo Junction, inside the precinct of the Megiddo Prison. It was built within the ancient city of Legio. It is believed to date to the 3rd century, making it one of the oldest Christian churches in the world. It was a few hundred yards from the Roman base camp of Legio VI Ferrata. A centurion donated one of the mosaics found in the church.

=== Modern period ===
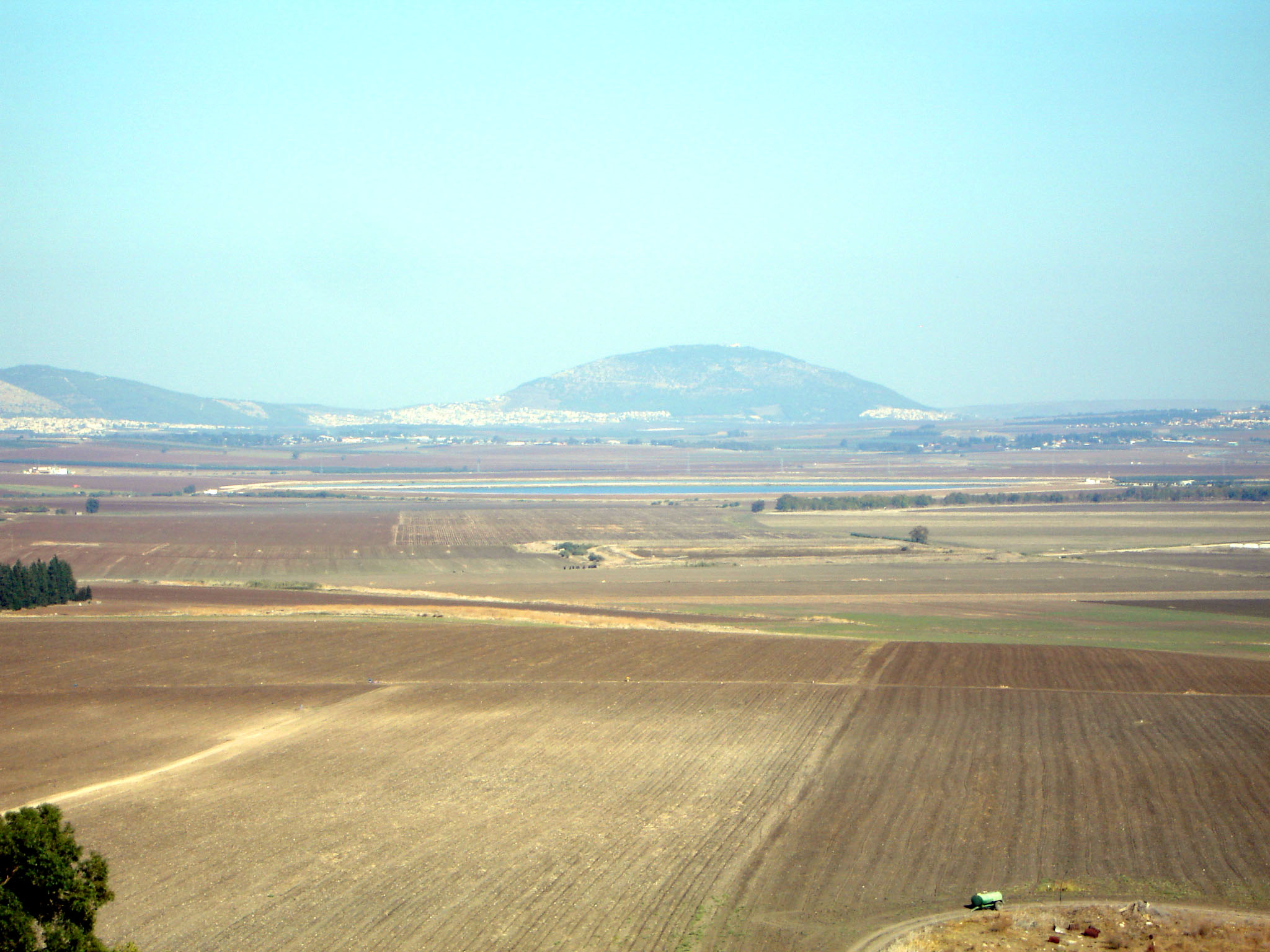
A view of Jezreel Valley and Mount Tabor from Megiddo

Megiddo is south of Kibbutz Megiddo by 1 kilometre (0.62 mi). Today,it lies at the northern entrance to Wadi Ara, an important mountain pass connecting the Jezreel Valley within Israel's coastal plain.

In 1964, during Pope Paul VI's visit to the Holy Land, Megiddo was the site where he met with dignitaries, including President Zalman Shazar and the Prime Minister Levi Eshkol.

=== Battles ===
Famous battles include:

- Battle of Megiddo (15th century BCE): fought between the armies of the Egyptian pharaoh Thutmose III and a large Canaanite coalition led by the rulers of Megiddo and Kadesh.
- Battle of Megiddo (609 BCE): fought between Necho II, pharaoh of the Twenty-sixth Dynasty of Egypt, and the Kingdom of Judah, during which King Josiah fell.
- Battle of Megiddo (1918): fought during World War I between Allied troops, led by General Edmund Allenby and the defending Ottoman army.

== Archaeological features ==
A path leads up through a six-chambered gate, considered by some archaeologists to have been built by Solomon, but which Israel Finkelstein dates to the Omrides, found in Stratum VA-IVB, late Iron IIA period. It overlooks the excavations of the Institute for the Study of Ancient Cultures. A solid circular stone structure has been interpreted as an altar or a high place from the Canaanite period. Further on is a grain pit from the Israelite period for storing provisions in case of siege. There are stables, originally thought to date from the time of Solomon but now dated a century and a half later to the time of Ahab. A water system consists of a square shaft 35 metres (115 ft) deep, the bottom of which opens into a tunnel bored through rock for 100 metres (330 ft) to a pool of water.

=== The Great Temple ===
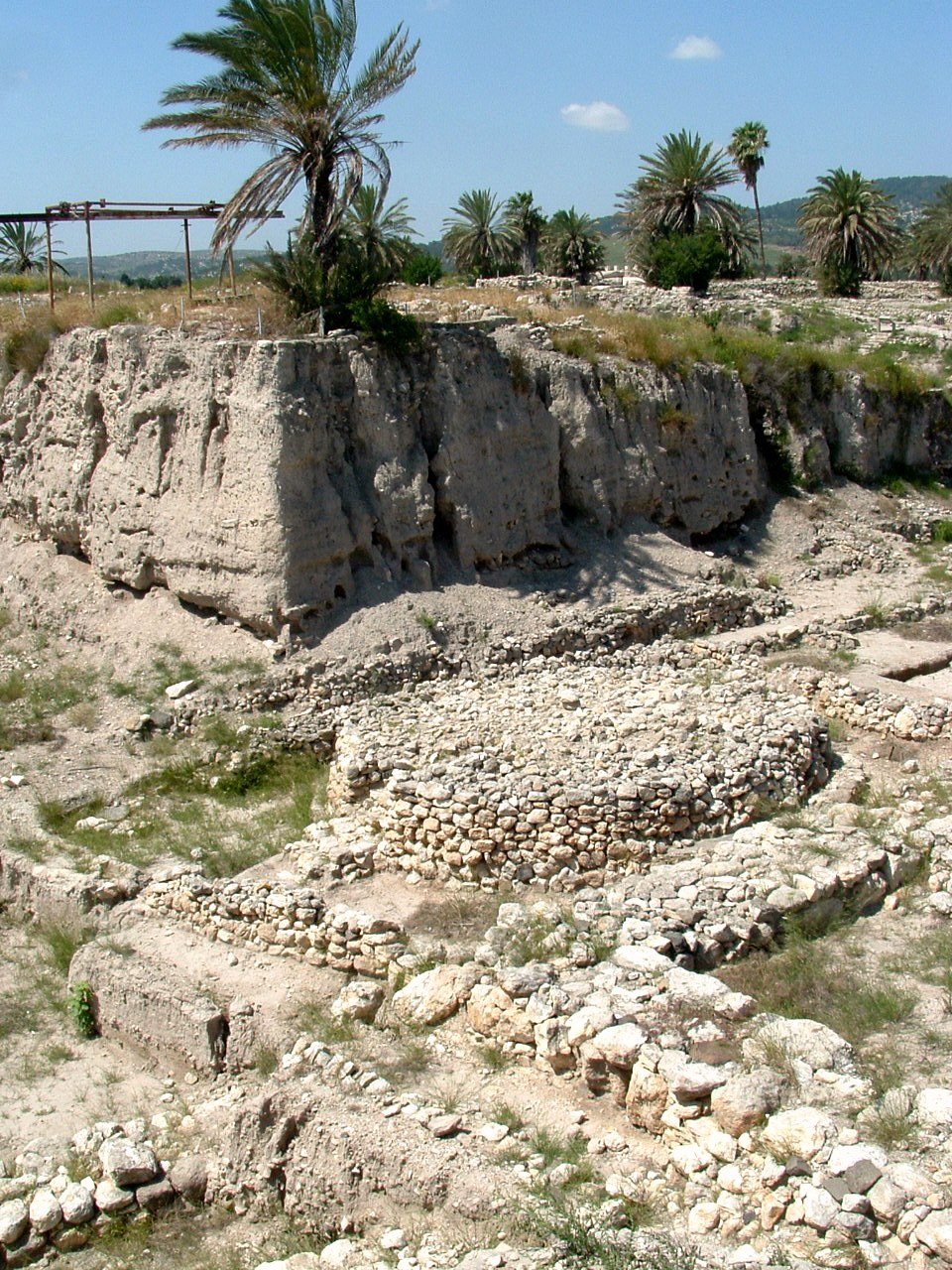
A circular altar-like shrine from the Early Bronze Age

Megiddo's 5,000-year-old "Great Temple", dated to the Early Bronze Age IB (ca. 3000 BC), has been described by its excavators as "the most monumental single edifice so far uncovered in the EB I Levant and ranks among the largest structures of its time in the Near East." The structure includes an immense 47.5 by 22 meters sanctuary. The temple was more than ten times larger than a typical temple of that era and was determined to be the site of ritual animal sacrifice. Corridors were used as favissae (deposits of cultic artifacts) to store bones after ritual sacrifice. More than 80% of the animal remains were young sheep and goats. The rest were cattle.

=== Jewelry ===
In 2010, a collection of jewelry pieces was found in a ceramic jug. The jewelry dates to around 1100 BC. The collection includes beads made of carnelian stone, a ring and earrings. The jug was subjected to molecular analysis to determine the contents. The collection was probably owned by a wealthy Canaanite family, likely belonging to the ruling elite.

=== Megiddo ivories ===
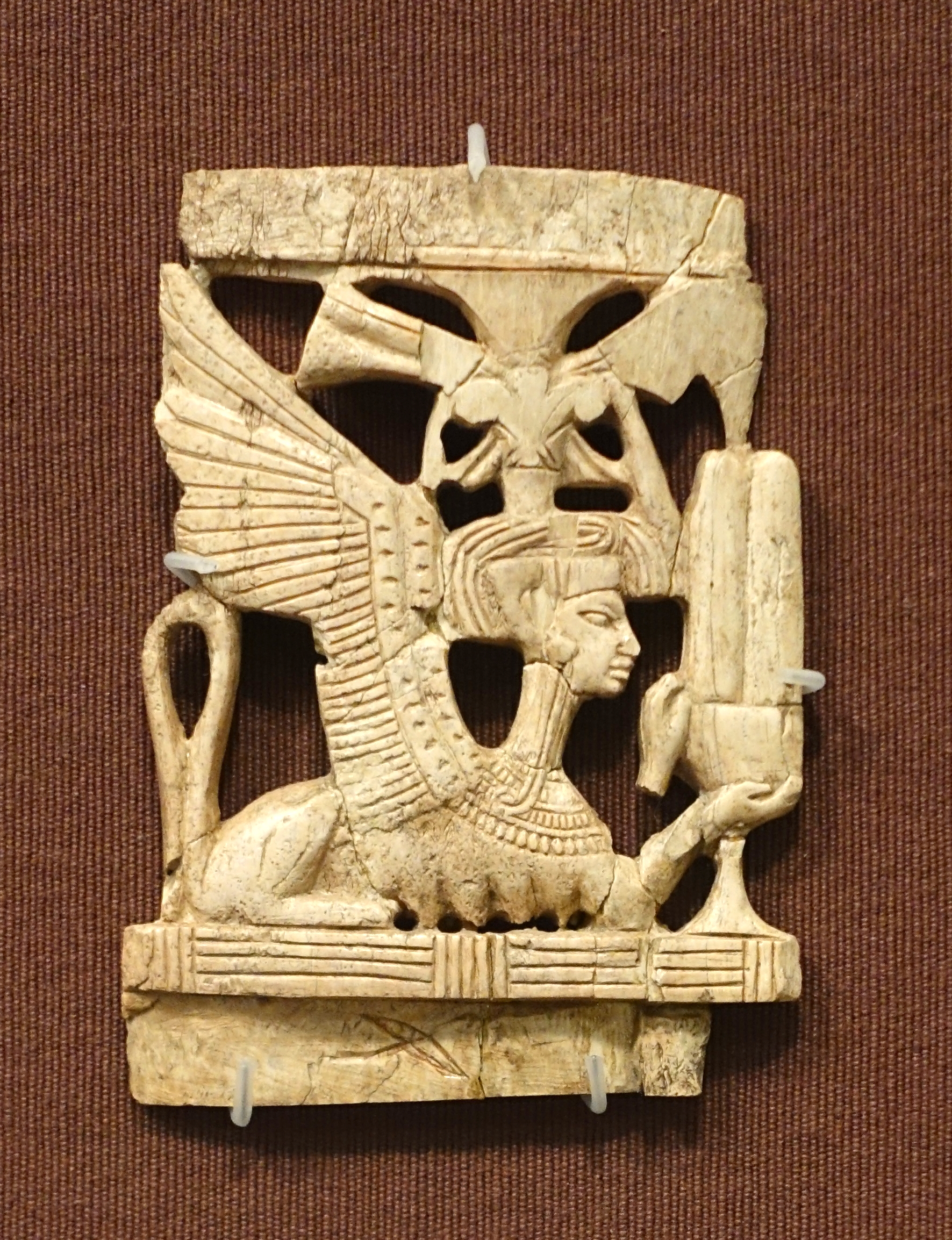
A female sphynx plaque, ivory, Megiddo 1300-1200 BC

The Megiddo ivories are thin carvings in ivory found at Tel Megiddo, mostly excavated by Gordon Loud. The ivories are on display at the Institute for the Study of Ancient Cultures in Chicago and the Rockefeller Museum in Jerusalem. They were found in the stratum VIIA or Late Bronze Age layer of the site. Carved from hippopotamus incisors from the Nile, they show Egyptian stylistic influence. An ivory pen case was found inscribed with the cartouche of Ramses III.

=== Megiddo stables ===
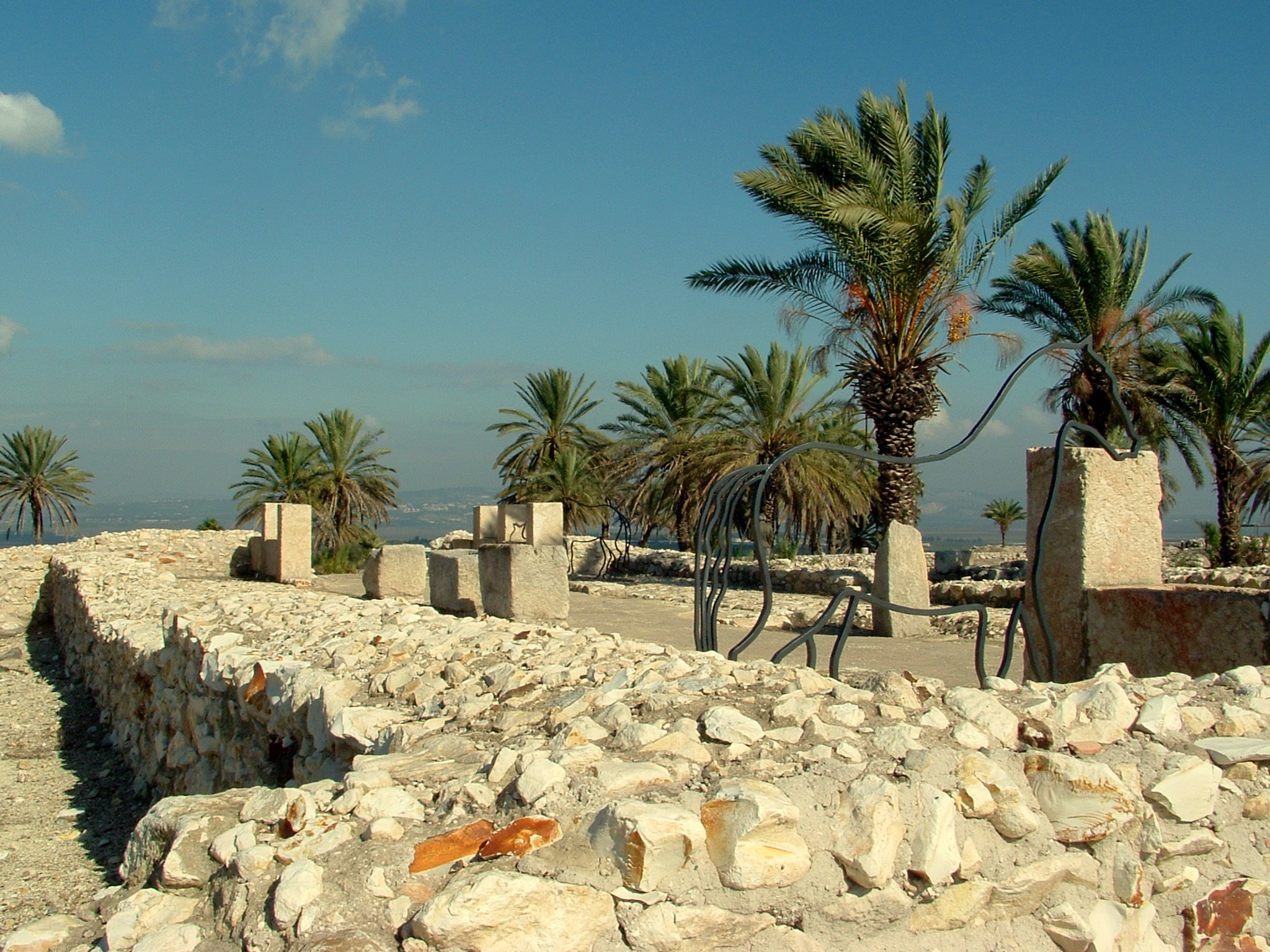
Southern stables

At Megiddo two stable complexes were excavated from Stratum IVA, one in the north and one in the south. Stratum VA-IVB has also been proposed for this area. The southern complex contained five structures built around a lime paved courtyard. The buildings were divided into three sections.

Two long stone paved aisles were built adjacent to a main corridor, paved with lime. The buildings were about twenty-one meters long by eleven meters wide. Separating the main corridor from outside aisles was a series of stone pillars. Holes were bored into many of these pillars so horses could be tied to them. The remains of stone mangers were found in the buildings. These mangers were placed between the pillars to feed the horses.

It is suggested that each side could hold fifteen horses, giving each building an overall capacity of thirty horses. The buildings on the northern side of the city were similar in their construction. There was no central courtyard. The capacity of the buildings of the north was about three hundred horses altogether. Both complexes could hold from 450 to 480 horses combined.

The buildings were found during excavations between 1927 and 1934. The head excavator initially interpreted the buildings as stables. Since then, his conclusions have been challenged by James B. Pritchard, Dr Adrian Curtis of Manchester University Ze'ev Herzog, and Yohanan Aharoni, who suggest they were storehouses, marketplaces or barracks.

=== The Bronze Age tomb ===
In February 2023, the remains of two elite brothers buried with Cypriot pottery, food and other valuable possessions were found in a Bronze Age tomb. Bioarchaeologists identified the early evidence of a Bronze Age cranial surgery called trepanation in one of the brothers. The study published in PLOS One, reports that the younger brother died in his teens or early 20s, most likely from an infectious illness like leprosy or tuberculosis. The older brother, who died immediately after the surgery, had angular notched trephination and was thought to be between the ages of 20 and 40. A 30-millimetre (1.2-inch) square-shaped hole was created on the frontal bone of the skull after his scalp was cut with a sharp instrument with a bevelled edge.

== Excavations ==
Megiddo has been excavated three times and is currently being excavated. The first excavations were carried out between 1903 and 1905 by Gottlieb Schumacher for the German Society for the Study of Palestine, excavating one main north–south trench and some subsidiary trenches and probes. Techniques used were rudimentary by later standards, and Schumacher's field notes and records were destroyed in World War I before being published. After the war, Carl Watzinger published the remaining data from the dig.

In 1925, digging was resumed by the Oriental Institute of the University of Chicago, financed by John D. Rockefeller Jr., continuing until the outbreak of the Second World War. The work was led initially by Clarence S. Fisher, and later by P. L. O. Guy, Robert Lamon, and Gordon Loud. The Oriental Institute intended to completely excavate the whole tel, layer by layer. Money ran out before they could do so. Today, excavators limit themselves to a square or a trench because they must leave something for future archaeologists with better techniques and methods. During these excavations, it was discovered that there were around eight levels of habitation. Many of the uncovered remains are preserved at the Rockefeller Museum in Jerusalem and the Institute for the Study of Ancient Cultures. The East Slope area of Megiddo was excavated to the bedrock to serve as a spoil area. The full results of that excavation were not published until decades later.

Yigael Yadin conducted excavations in 1960, 1966, 1967 (with Yigal shiloh), and 1971 for the Hebrew University. Anabel Zarzecki-Peleg published the formal results of those digs in Hebrew University's Qedem 56 (2016).

Since 1994, Megiddo has been the subject of biannual excavation campaigns conducted by the Megiddo Expedition of Tel Aviv University, co-directed by Israel Finkelstein, David Ussishkin, Norma Franklin, and Baruch Halpern with Eric H. Cline of The George Washington University serving as associate director (USA), together with a consortium of international universities. One notable feature of the dig is close on-site cooperation between archaeologists and specialist scientists, with detailed chemical analysis being performed at the dig itself using a field infrared spectrometer.

In 2010, the Jezreel Valley Regional Project, directed by Matthew J. Adams of Bucknell University in cooperation with the Megiddo Expedition, undertook excavations of the eastern extension of the Early Bronze Age town at the site known as Tel Megiddo East.

== See also ==
- Lajjun
- Cities of the ancient Near East
