= Legio =

Archaeological site in northern Israel

Coordinates: 32°34′20″N 35°10′13″E

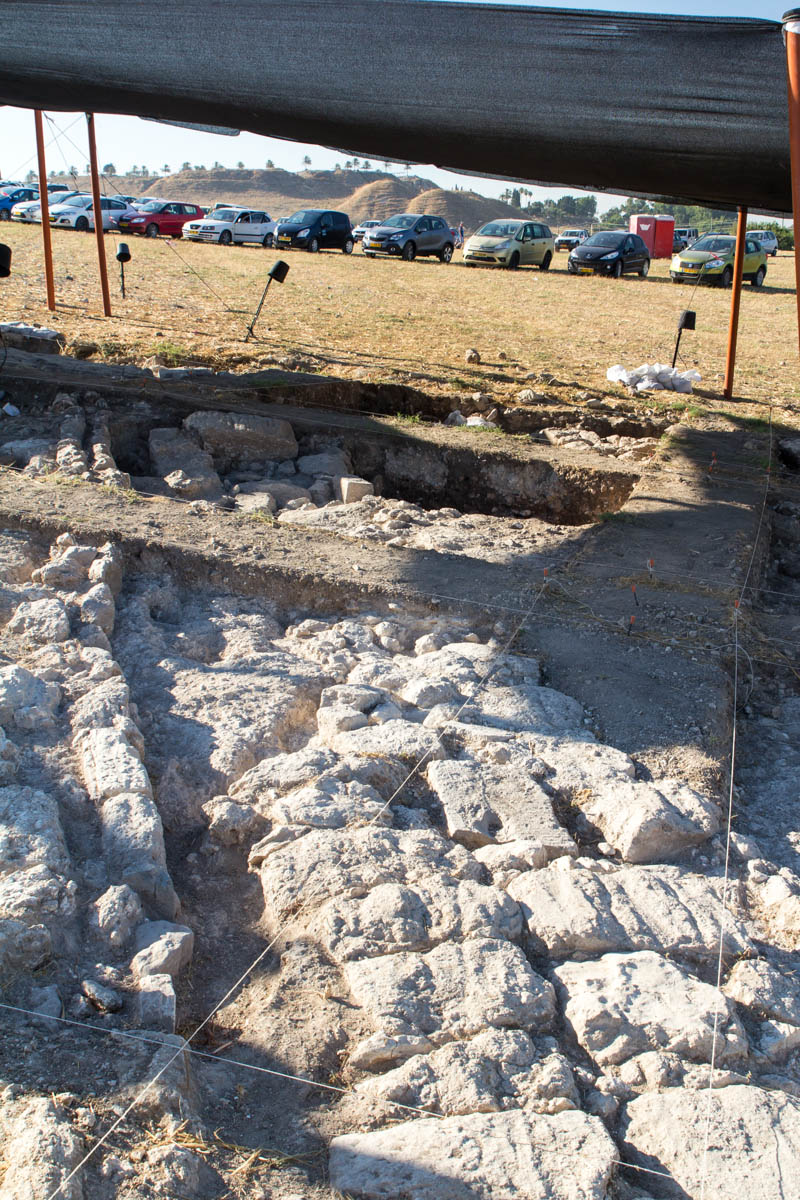
Legio excavations

Legio was a Roman military camp south of Tel Megiddo in the Roman province of Galilee.

== History ==
Following the Bar Kokhba revolt (132-136 CE), Legio VI Ferrata was stationed at Legio near Caparcotna. The approximate location of the camp of the Legio VI Ferrata was known from the persistence of its name in the form Lajjun by which a Palestinian village was known. It was close to the ancient town of Rimmon, perhaps the Hadad-rimmon of Zechariah 12:11, which in the 3rd century was renamed Maximianopolis by Diocletian in honor of his co-emperor Maximian. Both places were within a single episcopal see, generally called Maximianopolis, but in one list of such sees the name Legionum (genitive plural of the Latin word Legio) is used, where the Greek original has "Maximianopolis".

Legio lies along Palestine's Via Maris, an ancient trade route linking Egypt with the northern empires of Syria, Anatolia and Mesopotamia since the Early Bronze Age.

== Archaeological methods and results ==
In 2002–2003, an archaeological survey was conducted in the Legio region by Yotam Tepper as part of his master's thesis. The survey located the legionary camp on the northern slope of El-Manach hill, the village of Ceparcotani on the adjacent hill, and the city of Maximianopolis on the site of the contemporary Kibbutz Megiddo. In 2013 Tepper and the Jezreel Valley Regional Project dug test trenches measuring approximately 295 ft (90 m) by 16.5 ft (5.0 m) feet that revealed clear evidence of the camp.

Aerial photography, satellite images, and high-resolution lidar data hinted that the hill known as el-Manach contained traces of artificial, human produced objects and structures. After this, slight depressions in the earth revealed the borders of the military camp itself. Long, linear indents that met at 90 degree angles were found on the north, south, and west side of the hill. The following evidence led to the use of archaeological techniques to further discover the uncovered items at Legio.

=== Ground-penetrating radar ===
Ground-penetrating radar was the primary technique used to uncover the findings at Legio. The technique involves using antenna frequencies and data-acquisition parameters to analyze what lay beneath the surface of a variety of different types of soil. This technique allows the user to analyze a wide range of land in a relatively efficient amount of time.

== Findings ==
No military headquarters of this type for this particular period had yet been excavated in the entire Eastern Roman Empire, and the 2013 excavations uncovered defensive earthworks, a circumvolution rampart, barracks areas and artifacts including roof tiles stamped with the name of the Sixth Legion, and fragments of scale armor. Coins were found during the excavation process. The coins were found to have countermarks on them showing the length of time the coins were in circulation. Decorative fibulae were also discovered in the Jezreel Valley.

In 2017, a monumental gate to the camp's headquarters, a stone mark and a dedicatory inscription were discovered that may be a listing of camp commanders or celebrated heroes of the Sixth Legion. In the camp's latrines, more than 200 Roman coins dating to the 2nd and 3rd centuries were found. Cremated human remains were discovered in a cooking pot.

A study by Anastasia Shapiro was done on the Petrographic Examination of Tiles, Bricks and Mortar from Legio. In Area B, ceramic tiles, tegulae roof tiles and square floor tiles, as well as bricks were uncovered. Eight tiles and two bricks were discovered bearing Roman legion stamps. Upon further analysis of these fragments, petrographic examinations indicate that all the sampled items are part of a homogeneous petrographic group. This matrix consists of calcareous fossiliferous clay containing some tiny, opaque stains of iron oxide and a small amount of silt, which comprises basalt-derived minerals. Some of the micro fossils have ferric or silica filling. Others being completely vitrified. Non-plastic material also makes up for about 2-18% of the volume of tegulae. This includes larger and smaller forms of basalt, quartz, chalk, fossil shells, and terra rosa.

=== Amphitheater ===
In 2023, researchers from USC Dornsife announced the discovery of Legio's amphitheater following clues left behind by Gottlieb Schumacher. The team described it as "It’s the first Roman military amphitheater ever uncovered in the Southern Levant, which encompasses Israel, Jordan and Palestine." Among the findings was a rare gold coin of Emperor Diocletian.

=== Aqueduct ===
The aqueduct was found on the southeast side of the hill, and drew its water from springs at Ain Kubbih. The aqueduct would then split in two directions heading towards Daher ed-Dar and flour mills in the Queni stream. The water provided by the aqueduct supplied the soldiers and legionnaires at Legio with a lasting supply of water. The structure allowed water from 124 meters above sea level to be sent to camps and cities. Without the aqueduct, the water would not be funneled to its desired locations in such an efficient time and process. Parts of the aqueduct remained exposed while a majority was covered in a layer of mud and other dumped pieces of earth.

=== Fibulae ===
A number of fibulae were discovered in the Jezreel Valley, dating back to the second century AD.

== See also ==
- Megiddo church, possibly dating to the 3rd century and located at Legio
- Lajjun
