= Megiddo church (Israel) =

Archaeological and religious site

Coordinates: 32°34′16.2″N 35°11′28.7″E

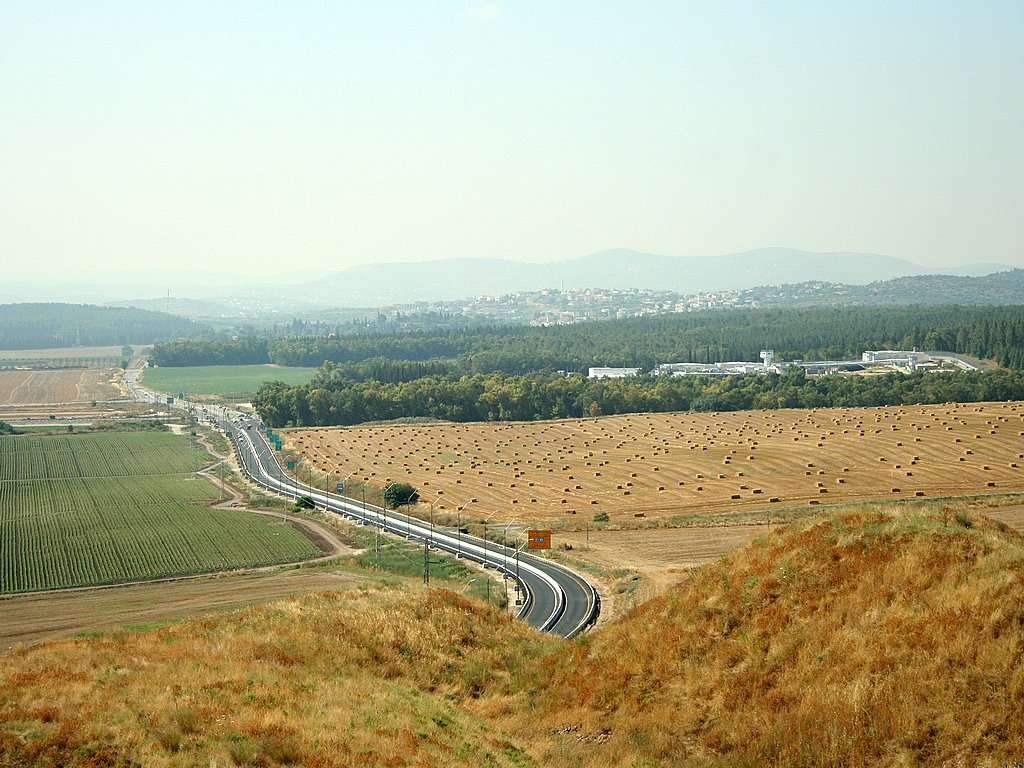
- Megiddo prison from the top of Tel Megiddo. The church is located on the prison grounds.

- Location within Israel
- Location: Tel Megiddo
- Country: Israel
- Denomination: Early Christianity

History
- Status: Inactive
- Founded: 230; 1796 years ago

Architecture
- Functional status: Ruins
- Style: House church
- Completed: ~3rd century
- Demolished: unknown

Megiddo church is an archaeological site near Tel Megiddo, Israel that preserves the foundations of one of the oldest Christian church buildings ever discovered by archaeologists. The ruins contain one of the oldest inscriptions referring to the divinity of Jesus.

The church was dated to circa 230 AD on the basis of pottery, coins, and the inscriptional style. The site's abandonment, circa 305 AD, is evident in the purposeful covering of the mosaic, which may correlate to the Diocletianic Persecution. Others suggest dating a century or more later.

== Location ==
The remains were found near Megiddo Prison, which is located a few hundred meters south of the tell and adjacent to Megiddo Junction in northern Israel. The area belonged to the ancient Roman town of Legio, known previously by its Hebrew name, Kefar ‘Otnay.

== Discovery and description ==
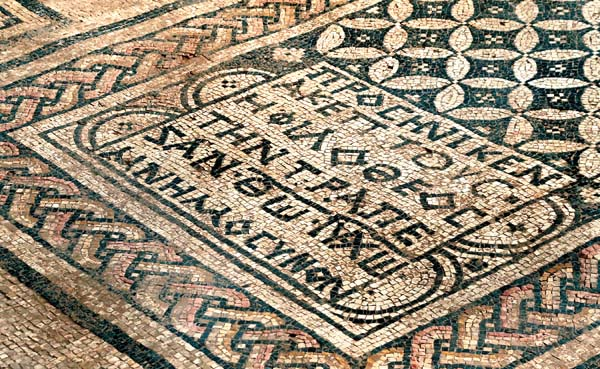
Megiddo mosaic

In 2005, Israeli archaeologist Yotam Tepper of Tel-Aviv University discovered the remains of a church, believed to be from the third century, a time when Christians were still persecuted by the Roman Empire.

Among the finds is an approx. 54-square-metre (580 sq ft) large mosaic. The mosaic is very well preserved and features geometrical figures and images of fish, an early Christian symbol, and notably a Greek inscription with a reference to "God, Jesus Christ." The majuscule Greek text reads,

ΠΡΟΣΗΝΙΚΕΝ

ΑΚΕΠΤΟΥΣ

ΗΦΙΛΟΘΕΟΣ

ΤΗΝΤΡΑΠΕ

ΖΑΝ Θ̅Ω̅ Ι̅Υ̅ Χ̅Ω̅

ΜΝΗΜΟΣΥΝΟΝ

This is possibly transcribed as, "Προσήνικεν Ἁκεπτοῦς ἡ φιλόθεος τὴν τράπεζαν Θεῷ Ἰησοῦ Χριστῷ μνημόσυνον," which translates to, "The God-loving Akeptous has offered the table to God Jesus Christ as a memorial."

An inscription in the Megiddo church mentions a Roman officer, "Gaianus," who donated "his own money" to have a mosaic made. The discovery is also said to rethink early Christianity as constantly persecuted before receiving imperial backing by Constantine. According to Eric Meyers, such data is increasingly pointing to Christians thriving alongside Jews, Samaritans and the Roman military.

== Dating ==
The church was dated to circa 230 AD on the basis of pottery, coins, and the inscriptional style. The site's abandonment, circa 305 AD, is evident in the purposeful covering of the mosaic, and relates well to the crisis of 303 AD, when the Christian communities of Judea experienced the Diocletianic Persecution.

The anthropologist Joe Zias, former curator for the Israel Antiquities Authority, said "My gut feeling is that we are looking at a Roman building that may have been converted to a church at a later date." The archaeological evidence may point to a later date, placing the church in the last quarter of the 3rd or first quarter of the 4th century.

== Exhibition at the Museum of the Bible ==
In September 2024, the Washington D.C.-based Museum of the Bible, in partnership with the Israel Antiquities Authority (IAA), opened the special exhibition, The Megiddo Mosaic: Foundations of Faith. The exhibition features the 3rd century A.D. mosaic floor.

== In culture ==
In March 2024, Angel Studios released the documentary film The Mosaic Church that describes the history of Megiddo church.

== See also ==
- Christianity in the ante-Nicene period
- Lajjun, the Arabic name of the later village
- Legio, the Roman name of the town
- Oldest churches in the world
