= Clarence Stanley Fisher =

American archaeologist

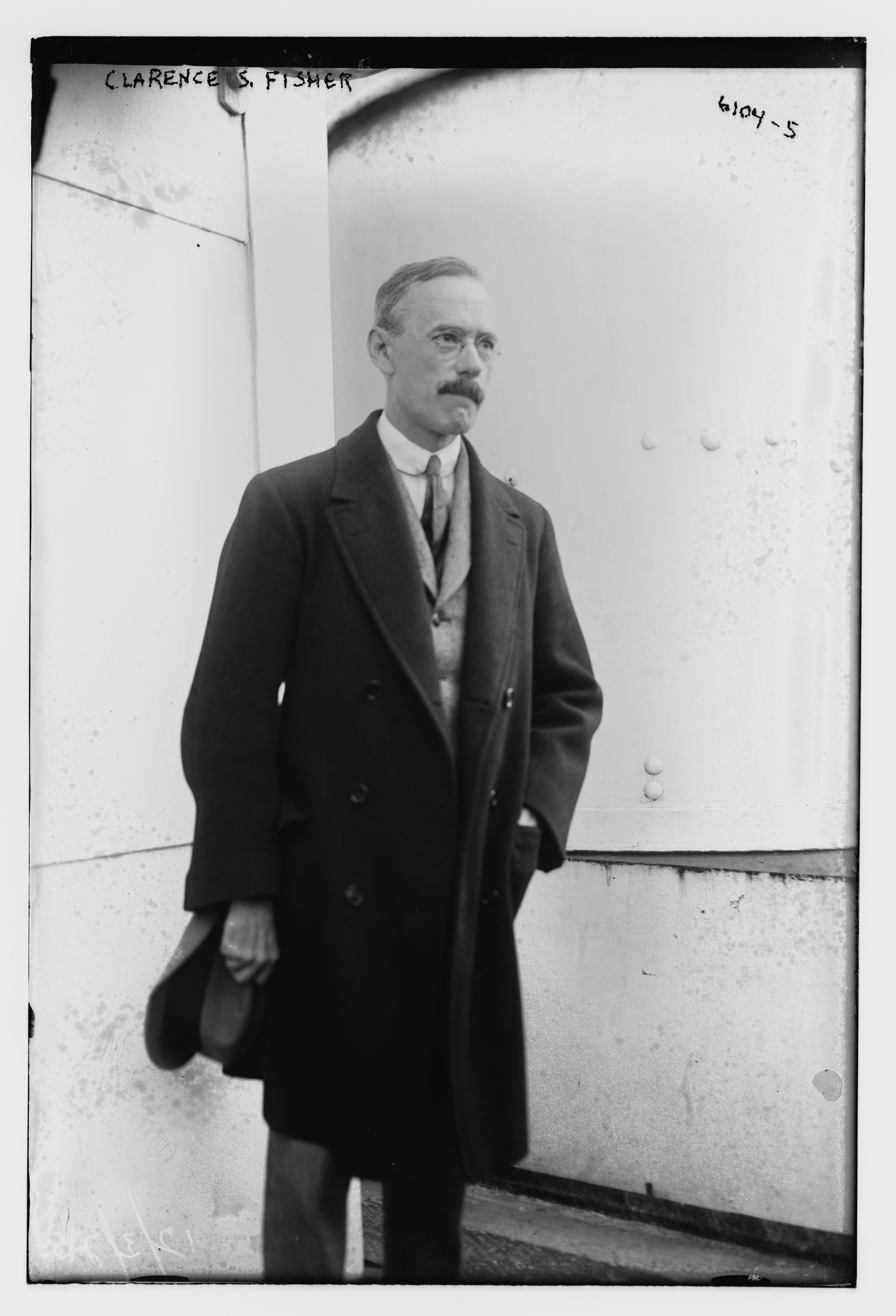
- Born: August 17, 1876; Philadelphia, Pennsylvania, U.S.
- Died: July 20, 1941 (aged 64); Jerusalem, Palestine
- Education: University of Pennsylvania
- Occupation: Archaeologist

Clarence Stanley Fisher (August 17, 1876 – July 20, 1941), known as C. S. Fisher, was an American archaeologist.

== Early life ==
Clarence Stanley Fisher was born on August 17, 1876, in Philadelphia, Pennsylvania. He graduated from the University of Pennsylvania, where he studied architecture.

== Career ==
Fisher devoted his career to Near Eastern archaeology. During World War I, Fisher was assigned to Egypt, where he worked under George Reisner there and in Palestine and undertook excavations at Dendera under the auspices of the University Museum, University of Pennsylvania. After the war, he undertook archaeological fieldwork in the Near East, still for the University Museum, for which he was awarded an honorary Doctorate of Science by the University in 1924.

From 1925–1927, Fisher served as Director of the Tel Megiddo excavations, the site of the ancient city of Megiddo. Megiddo is known for its historical, geographical, and theological importance, especially under its Greek name Armageddon. The excavation was conducted under the auspices of the Oriental Institute at the University of Chicago with funding from John D. Rockefeller Jr. Fisher was succeeded as Director by P.L.O. Guy in 1927.

Also in 1925, Fisher was appointed professor of Archaeology in the American Schools of Oriental Research (ASOR). He spent the years 1936–1940 compiling his monumental Corpus of Palestinian Pottery.

Fisher was the moving spirit in the founding of the Dar el-Awlad, Jerusalem, the Home for Children.

== Death and legacy ==
Fisher died in Jerusalem. His papers, formerly housed at the Albright Institute, Jerusalem, are held in the archives of the American Schools of Oriental Research at Boston University.

== Bibliography ==
- Fisher, Clarence S., 1929, The Excavation of Armageddon, Oriental Institute Communications 4, University of Chicago Press
