= Zububa =

- Municipality type D (Village council)

Arabic transcription(s)
  - Arabic: زبوبا
- Location of Zububa within Palestine
- Coordinates: 32°32′44″N 35°13′25″E
- Palestine grid: 170/216
- State: State of Palestine
- Governorate: Jenin

Government
  - Type: Village council

Population
  - Total: 2,322
- Name meaning: either from "raisins", or from "dried up"

Zububa (Arabic: زبوبا) is the northernmost Palestinian village in the West Bank, located 10 km Northwest of the city of Jenin in the northern West Bank. According to the Palestinian Central Bureau of Statistics, the town had an estimated population of 2322 inhabitants as of 2017 Palestine Census.

== History ==
This place is marked under the name Sububa on the map of Marino Sanuto (1322 A.D.), and identified by him with Megiddo.

=== Ottoman era ===
In 1838 it was noted as a Muslim village called Ezbuba in the Jenin administrative region.

In 1870, Victor Guérin noted it in the distance, as a small village on an oblong mound.

In 1870/1871 (1288 AH), an Ottoman census listed the village in the nahiya of Shafa al-Gharby.

In 1882, the PEF's Survey of Western Palestine described Ezbuba: "A village of mud, of moderate size, with wells and cisterns. It stands near the foot of the hills, and is probably an ancient site, having a sarcophagus, and a wine-press to the south."

=== British Mandate era ===
In the 1922 census of Palestine conducted by the British Mandate authorities, Zebuba had a population 391 Muslims, decreasing in the 1931 census to 344 Muslim, in a total of 83 houses.

In the 1945 statistics, the population was 560 Muslims, with 13,843 dunams of land, according to an official land and population survey. Of this, 209 dunams were used for plantations and irrigable land, 13,054 dunams were for cereals, while a total of 16 dunams were built-up, urban land.

=== Jordanian era ===
Following the 1948 Arab–Israeli War, and the subsequent 1949 Armistice Agreements, Zububa came under Jordanian rule.

The Jordanian census of 1961 found 683 inhabitants.

=== Israeli era ===
Since the 1967 Six-Day War, Zububa has been under Israeli rule. In early 1980s, the town came under the governance of the Israeli Civil Administration system.

With the Oslo Accords, the town came under the direct control of the Palestinian National Authority in 1994.

=== Palestinian era ===
Confrontations broke out between Palestinian residents and Israeli forces during an IDF raid in Zububa.

== Demography ==
=== Local origins ===
Some residents of Zububa originated from Rammun and Ya'bad, but the majority have origins in Silat al-Harithiya.

== Bibliography ==
- Barron, J.B., ed. (1923). Palestine: Report and General Abstracts of the Census of 1922. Government of Palestine.
- Conder, C.R. (1878). Tent work in Palestine. A record of discovery and adventure. Vol. 1. London R. Bentley & Son.
- Conder, C.R.; Kitchener, H.H. (1882). The Survey of Western Palestine: Memoirs of the Topography, Orography, Hydrography, and Archaeology. Vol. 2. London: Committee of the Palestine Exploration Fund.
- Government of Jordan, Department of Statistics (1964). First Census of Population and Housing. Volume I: Final Tables; General Characteristics of the Population (PDF).
- Government of Palestine, Department of Statistics (1945). Village Statistics, April, 1945.
- Guérin, V. (1875). Description Géographique Historique et Archéologique de la Palestine (in French). Vol. 2: Samarie, pt. 2. Paris: L'Imprimerie Nationale.
- Hadawi, S. (1970). Village Statistics of 1945: A Classification of Land and Area ownership in Palestine. Palestine Liberation Organization Research Center.
- Mills, E., ed. (1932). Census of Palestine 1931. Population of Villages, Towns and Administrative Areas. Jerusalem: Government of Palestine.
- Palmer, E.H. (1881). The Survey of Western Palestine: Arabic and English Name Lists Collected During the Survey by Lieutenants Conder and Kitchener, R. E. Transliterated and Explained by E.H. Palmer. Committee of the Palestine Exploration Fund.
- Robinson, E.; Smith, E. (1841). Biblical Researches in Palestine, Mount Sinai and Arabia Petraea: A Journal of Travels in the year 1838. Vol. 3. Boston: Crocker & Brewster.
