= Megiddo =

Megiddo may refer to:

== Places and sites in Israel ==
- Tel Megiddo, site of an ancient city in Israel's Jezreel valley
- Megiddo Airport, a domestic airport in Israel
- Megiddo church (Israel)
- Megiddo, Israel, a kibbutz in Israel
- Megiddo prison, a prison in Israel
- Megiddo Junction, a motorway junction in northern Israel

== United States churches ==
- Megiddo Mission, Rochester, New York
- Megiddo Church, Rochester, New York

== People ==
- Nimrod Megiddo, mathematician and computer scientist

== Fiction ==
- Megiddo: The Omega Code 2, a 2001 American film
- "Megiddo", the 65th chapter and 34th episode of That Time I Got Reincarnated as a Slime
- Prince Megiddo, a character in the Japanese television series Kagaku Sentai Dynaman
- Aradia and Damara Megido, characters from the webcomic Homestuck (2009–2016)

== Music ==
- Megiddo (EP), a 1997 EP by Satyricon
- Megiddo (Lauren Hoffman album), 1997

== Other uses ==
- Megiddo (battle honour), awarded to British Empire units that fought at the 1918 Battle of Megiddo
- Project Megiddo, an FBI report on possible criminality associated with the new millennium
- Megiddo, a 1984 abstract strategy board game designed by Steve Baldwin which is similar to Pente
- Megido, a predecessor project to Lazarus, an implementation of the programming language Pascal

== See also ==
- Battle of Megiddo (disambiguation)
