= Golani =

Golani may refer to:

- Golani Brigade, an Israeli infantry brigade
  - Golani Interchange, an interchange in Northern Israel near a museum for the Golani Brigade
- Golani Family, an Indian royal family
- Golani, a nickname for any person who participated in the anti-communist Golaniad protests in Romania
- Golani, a variant of the IMI Galil rifle built in the US
- Al-Golani, a variant transliteration of al-Julani
- Rivka Golani (born 1946), Israeli violist
