= Megiddo Junction =

Highway junction in northern Israel

Megiddo Junction צומת מגידו
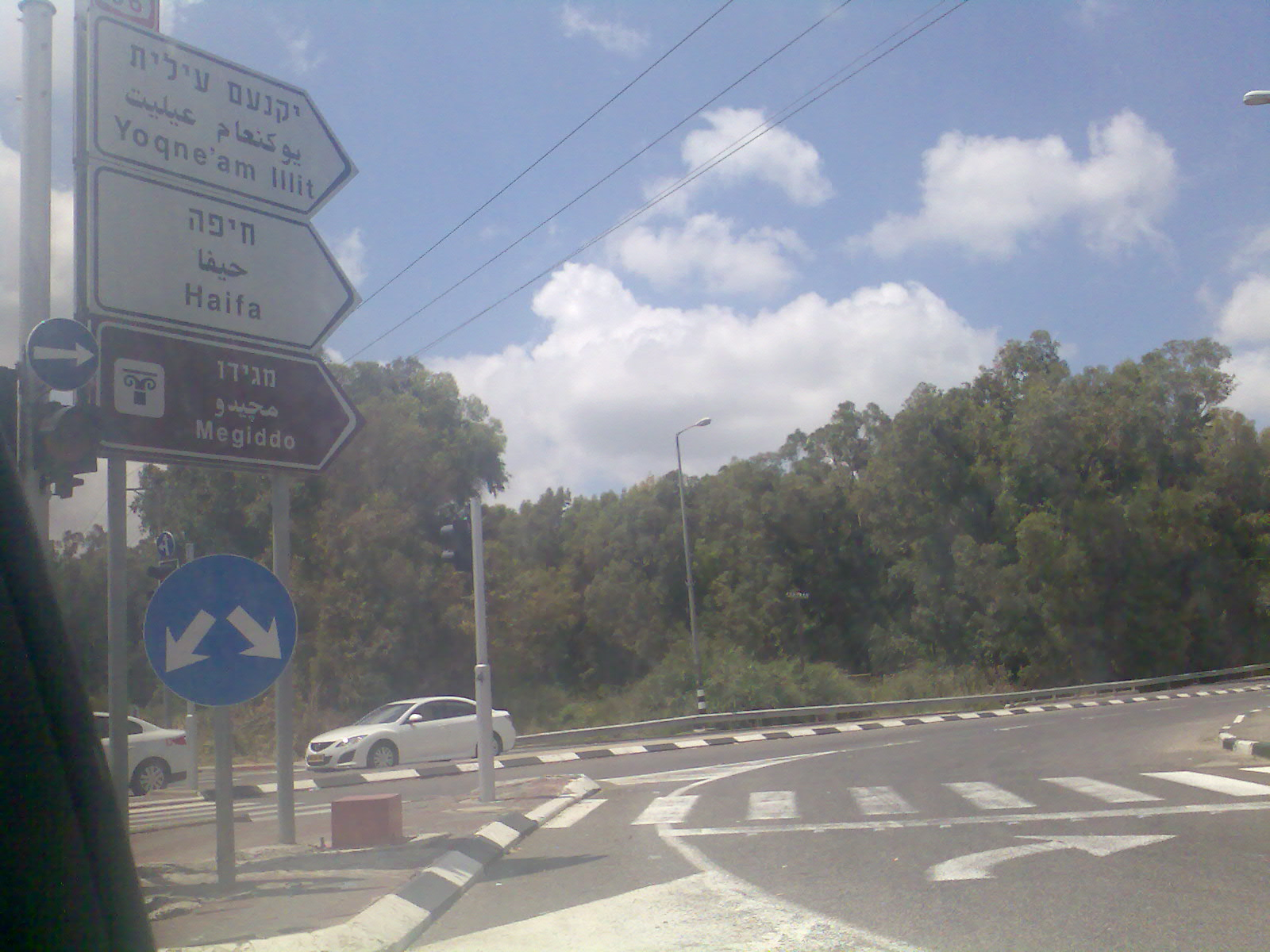
- The road junction in 2011

Location
- Northern Israel
- Coordinates: 32°34′23″N 35°11′31″E
- Roads at junction: Highway 65; Highway 66

Construction
- Type: Intersection

The Megiddo Junction (Hebrew: צומת מגידו, romanized: Tzomet Megido) is an intersection of Highways 65 and 66 in northern Israel, at the exit from the mountain pass coming up through Wadi Ara into the Jezreel Valley.

It is named for the nearby ruins of the biblical city of Megiddo, also known as Armageddon, and the sites of several historic battles. Adjacent to the junction is the large Megiddo Prison (formerly a military prison), and less than 1 kilometre (0.62 mi) to the northwest is kibbutz Megiddo.

The 5-kilometre (3.1 mi) stretch of Highway 65 east towards Afula is called Kvish HaSargel, lit. 'the Ruler Road', since it is very flat and straight.

This is an important junction for the residents of the northern district of Israel, because it sits at the entrance to the Wadi Ara mountain pass which connects the North to the Trans-Israel Highway (Highway 6) and other highways in Israel's coastal plain and, by that, to the rest of the country. Its importance slightly diminished when Highway 6 was completed all the way to the Ein Tut interchange near Ramot Menashe in 2009. The junction and Highway 66 can now be used as an alternate route for reaching Highway 6 via another mountain pass, Wadi Milek, located northwest of Wadi Ara.

On June 5, 2002, 17 people lost their lives and 43 people were injured in the Megiddo Junction bus bombing.

== See also ==
- Megiddo (disambiguation)
- Battles of Megiddo (disambiguation)
- Battle of Megiddo (1918)
- Battle of Sharon (1918)
