= Highway 66 (Israel) =

Highway in Israel

Coordinates: 32°37′14″N 35°08′13″E

Highway 66
- כביש 66
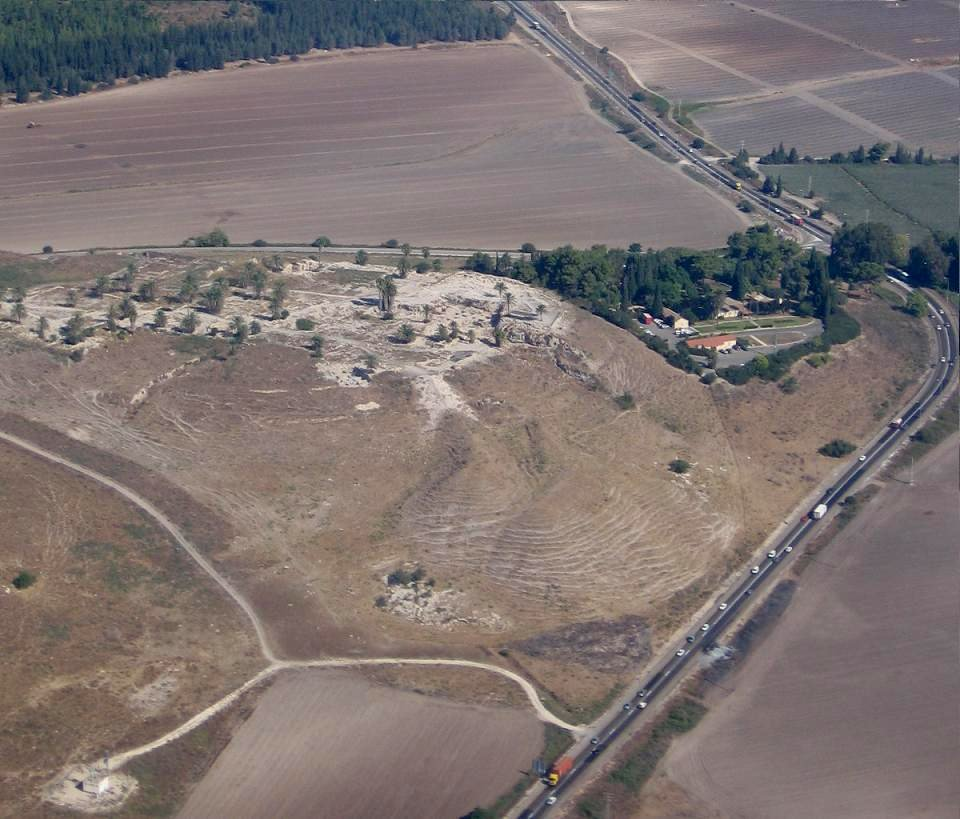

Route information
- Length: 18 km (11 mi)
- Existed: 1929–present

Major junctions
- South end: Salem Security Checkpoint
- North end: Tel Kashish Interchange

Location
- Country: Israel

Highway system
- Roads in Israel; Highways
← Highway 65	→ Highway 67

Highway 66 (Hebrew: כביש 66) is a north–south highway in the Jezreel Valley in northern Israel.

== History ==
Highway 66 extends along the eastern lowlands below the Menashe Heights and the Carmel. It is 18 kilometres (11 mi) long. In the past the road continued south to Jenin, but today it ends at checkpoint. The northern section of the highway was constructed in 1929 to allow access to Tel Megiddo archaeological site for the anticipated visit of John D. Rockefeller Jr. The southern section was constructed in the 1930s, and the highway opened to general traffic between Haifa and Jenin in 1936 as a bypass road avoiding Nazareth.

The highway is considered to be dangerous, with more than 30 people losing their lives due to accidents in Highway 66.

== Junctions & Interchanges (South to North) ==
District	Location	km	mi	Name	Destinations	Notes
Green Line
Salem Security Checkpoint; NO northbound through-traffic for green (Palestinian Authority) license plates
Haifa	Ma'ale Iron	1	0.62	צומת זלפה (Zalafa Junction)	Road 6532	
Northern	Megiddo	3	1.9	צומת מגידו (Megiddo Junction)	Highway 65	
Northern	Megiddo	4.8	3.0	צומת מגידו עתיקות (Ancient Megiddo Junction)	Road 6951	
Northern	HaYogev	5.5	3.4	צומת היוגב (HaYogev Junction)	Entrance to HaYogev	
Northern	Midrakh Oz	7.4	4.6	צומת מדרך עוז (Midrakh Oz Junction)	Entrance to Midrakh Oz	
Northern	Mishmar Ha'Emek	10	6.2	צומת משמר העמק (Mishmar Ha'Emek Junction)	Road 6953	
Northern	HaZore'a	14	8.7	צומת הזורע (HaZore'a Junction)	Entrance to HaZore'a	
Northern	Yokneam	17	11	צומת התשבי (HaTishbi Junction)	Route 772	
Northern	Kiryat Tiv'on	18	11	מחלף תל קשיש (Tel Kashish Interchange)	Highway 6 Highway 77	
1.000 mi = 1.609 km; 1.000 km = 0.621 mi

== Landmarks ==
- Tel Megiddo National Park

== See also ==
- List of highways in Israel
