= Highway 65 (Israel) =

Road in Israel

Coordinates: 32°35′30″N 35°14′25″E

Highway 65
- כביש 65
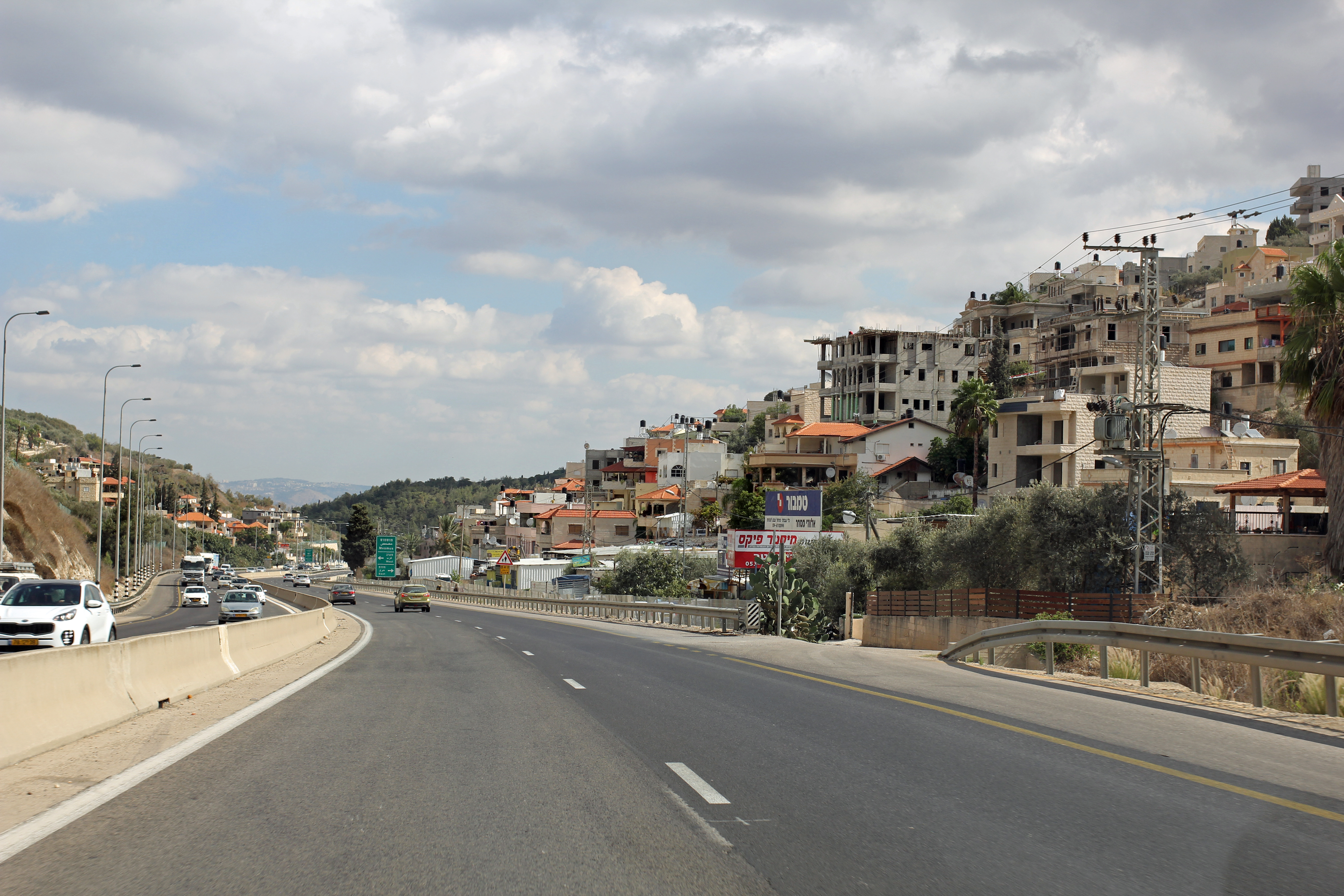

Major junctions
- South end: Highway 2
- North end: Nahal Amud junction

Location
- Country: Israel

Highway system
- Roads in Israel; Highways
← Highway 60	→ Highway 66

Highway 65 is a major highway in northern Israel. It connects Hadera with the Galilee.

This road is the shortest and simplest way to connect these two major regions. Historically, people traveled on or near this route for thousands of years from the coastal plain to reach the Galilee, and beyond it the Golan, Syria, Lebanon, and Jordan (see Via Maris). In the 1949 Armistice Agreements Israel received the portion of this road in Wadi Ara for this reason.

The road passes by many Arab villages and cities but few Jewish habitations in Nahal Iron. In October 2000, at the beginning of the Second Intifada, the road was blocked by local Palestinian protesters. For security reasons Highway 70, which runs parallel to the north of Highway 65, has been improved.

The northern section of the highway, between Golani and Nahal Amud (nearby Kadarim) is a freeway.

== Path of Highway 65 from southwest to northeast ==
The road begins in the coastal plain near Hadera and Caesarea. Its western terminus is Highway 2. After Pardes Hana-Karkur, the road is colloquially known as "Wadi Ara road", passing through Iron Valley and Umm el-Fahm. Afterward the road intersects Highway 66 at Megiddo junction. From this point to Afula the road crosses the southern part of the Jezreel Valley. This section is widely known as "Kvish HaSargel" (in English: "Ruler Road") as its route is as flat and straight as a ruler. It then passes by Afula Illit, and turns directly north until crossing Highway 77 at Golani Interchange. It continues to its northeast terminus at Nahal Amud junction, where it meets Highway 85.

== Improvements ==
Long-term plans are in place to turn the entire highway into a freeway because it is often mentioned as one of the riskiest roads in northern Israel. A new bypass section situated just north of Afula is part of these plans.

Given the large cost of the total effort, estimated at roughly NIS 3.5 billion (equal to almost US$1 billion), the project is being performed in phases. The Afula–Golani section was given priority for expansion because it was historically the only remaining stretch with just two lanes. After budget planning, the Ministry of Transport and Road Safety declared full funding and accelerated implementation of these safety improvements.

== See also ==
- List of highways in Israel
