= Highway 77 (Israel) =

Highway in Israel

Coordinates: 32°46′21″N 35°16′09″E

Highway 77
- כביש 77
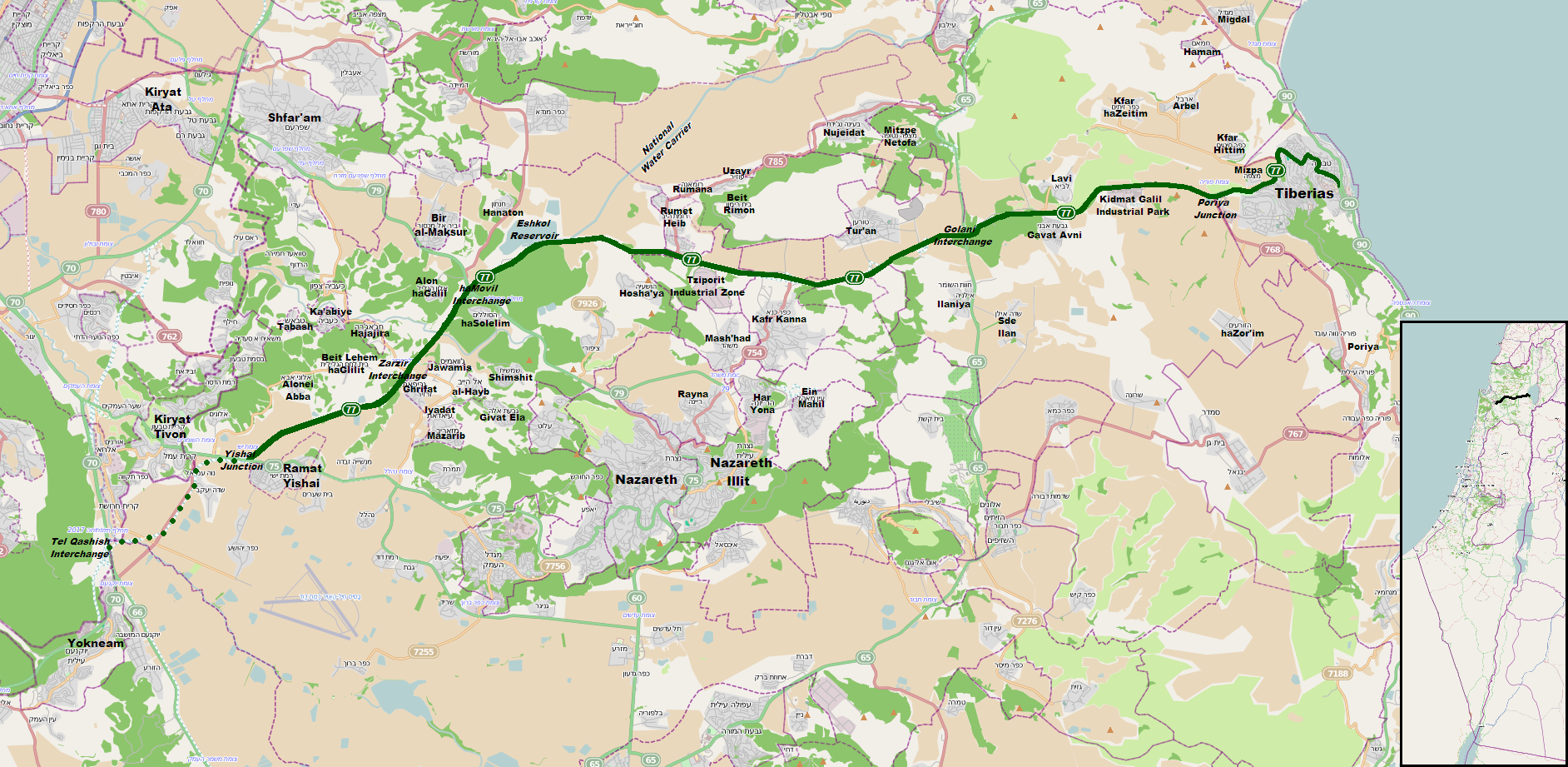

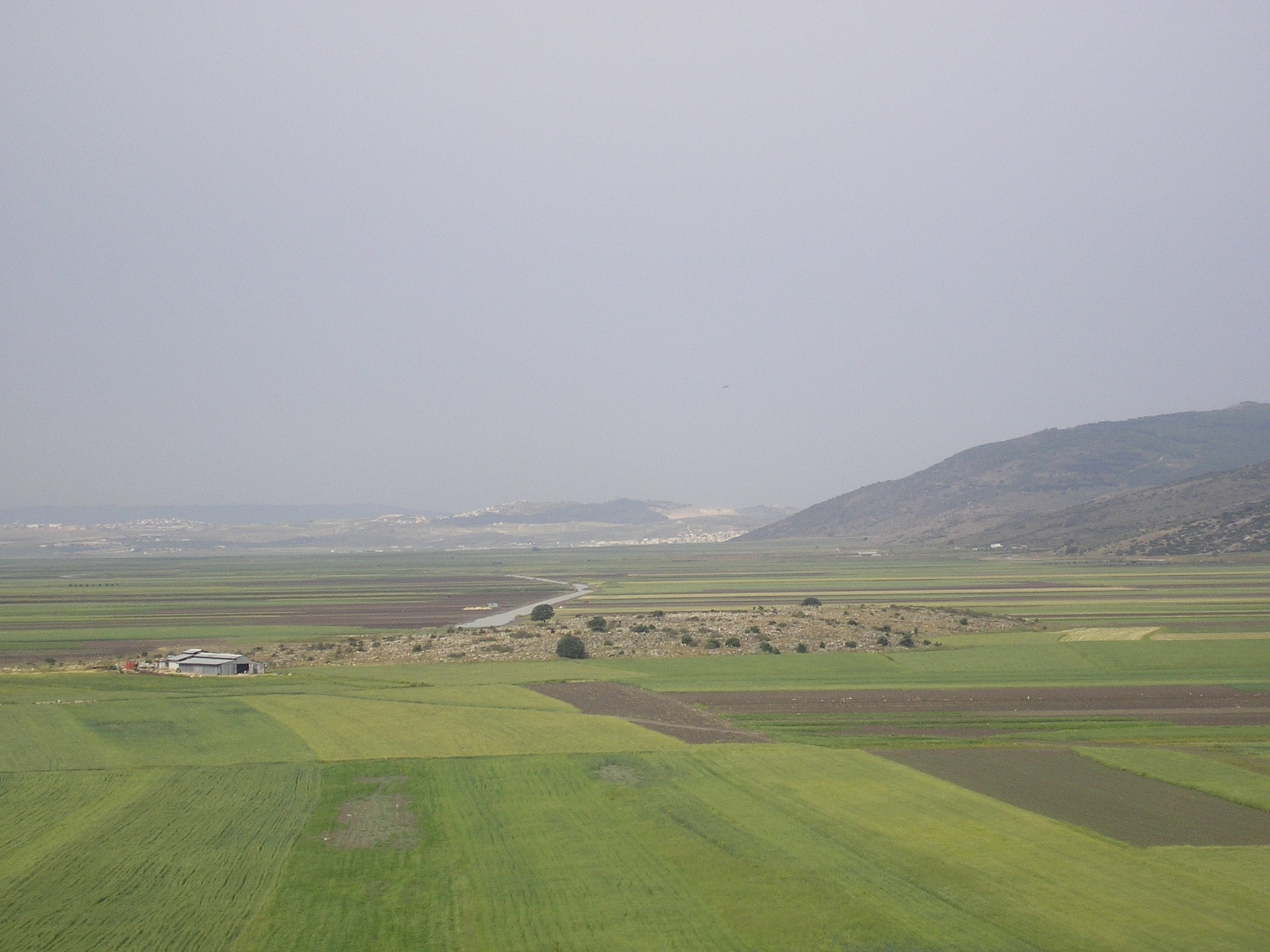
- Highway 77 passes through the Beit Netofa Valley

Route information
- Length: 48 km (30 mi)

Major junctions
- West end: Tel Qashish Interchange
- Golani Interchange
- East end: Tiberias Junction

Location
- Country: Israel
- Major cities: Yokneam Illit, Tiberias

Highway system
- Roads in Israel; Highways
← Highway 75	→ Highway 79

Highway 77 is an east-west highway in northern Israel. It crosses the Lower Galilee in the region of the Beit Netofa Valley. The road leads from the Tel Qashish Interchange nearby Yokneam Illit to Tiberias. It is 48km long. Its western section, from the Tel Qashish Interchange to the Golani Interchange is a freeway.

== Junctions & Interchanges (West to East) ==
District	Location	km	mi	Name	Destinations	Notes
Haifa	Kiryat Tiv'on	0	0.0	מחלף תל קשיש (Tel Qashish Interchange)	Highway 6 Highway 66	
Northern	Ramat Yishai	6	3.7	מחלף ישי (Yishai Interchange)	Highway 75	
Northern	Zarzir	12	7.5	מחלף זרזיר (Zarzir Interchange)	Road 7626	
Northern	HaSolelim	15.5	9.6	מחלף המוביל (HaMovil Interchange)	Highway 79	
Northern	Hoshaya	22	14	מחלף הושעיה (Hoshaya Interchange)	Road 7920	
Northern	Tsiporit Industrial Zone	24.5	15.2	מחלף ציפורית (Tsiporit Interchange)	Entrance road	
Northern	Kafr Kanna	27	17	מחלף בית רימון (Beit Rimon Interchange)	Route 754	
Northern	Tur'an	30	19	מחלף טורעאן (Tur'an Interchange)	Islam Street	
Northern	Ilaniya	33	21	מחלף גולני (Golani Interchange)	Highway 65	Named after Golani Brigade
Northern	Giv'at Avni	36	22	צומת גבעת אבני (Giv'at Avni Junction)	Road 7707	
Northern	Tiberias	42	26	צומת פוריה (Poria Junction)	Route 768	
Northern	Kfar Hittim	45	28	צומת כפר חיטים (Kfar Hittim Junction)	Road 7717	
Northern	Tiberias	48	30	צומת טבריה (Tiberias Junction)	Highway 90	
1.000 mi = 1.609 km; 1.000 km = 0.621 mi

== Places of interest on Highway 77 ==
- HaSolelim forest nature reserve
- Monument to the Bedouin soldier
- Eshkol Reservoir
- The church and the grave of Rabban Shimon ben Gamliel in Kafr Kanna
- Memorial to the Golani Brigade at the Golani Interchange
- Lavi forest
- The Sea of Galilee

== See also ==
- List of highways in Israel
- Lower Galilee
- Beit Netofa Valley
