= Megiddo Prison =

Israeli prison

Meggido Prison
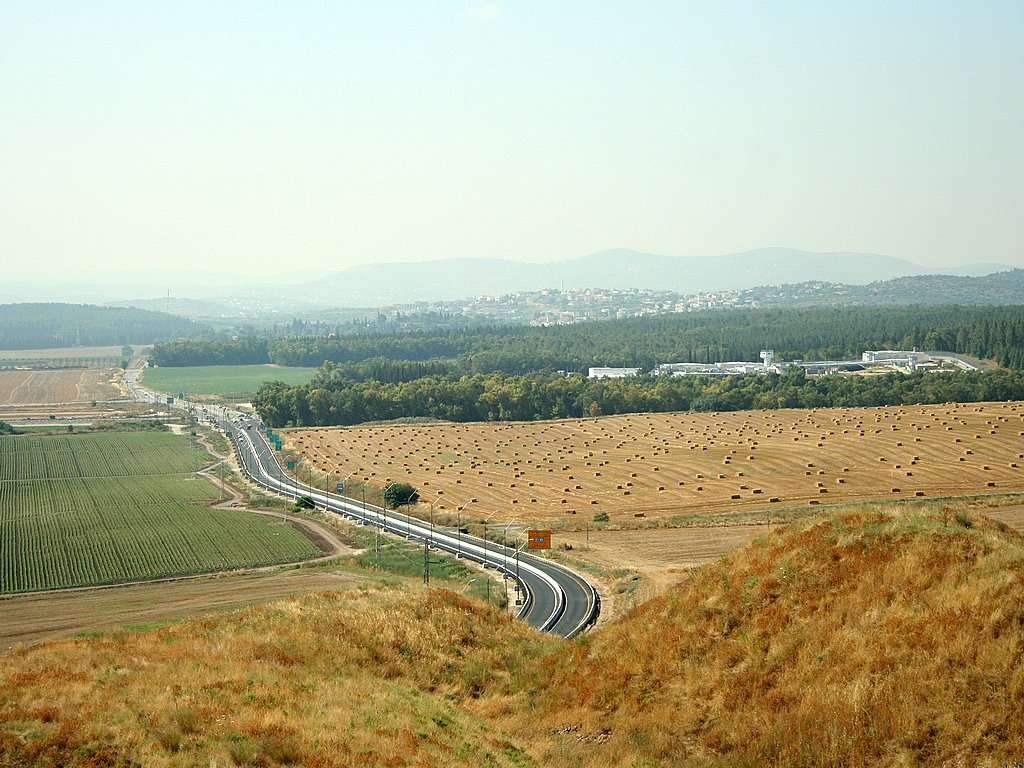

- Location within Israel
- Location: Megiddo Junction; 32°34′15″N 35°11′22″E
- Managed by: Israel Prison Service

Megiddo Prison (Hebrew: כלא מגידו, Kele Meggido) is an Israeli prison facility located near the Megiddo Junction. It has gained notoriety for reports of abuse and torture against Palestinian prisoners.

The prison itself was built over the ruins of the ancient Jewish village of Othnai, which was later replaced by a Roman army camp. The depopulated Palestinian village of Lajjun, which was captured by Israel's Golani Brigade in Operation Gideon in 1948, is also located nearby.

== History ==
In the 1970s, Megiddo Prison was used as a military prison for long-term prisoners. Following the outbreak of the First Intifada at the end of 1987, the prison was used to incarcerate Palestinian prisoners, under the responsibility of the military police force. At the height of the Intifada, between 1,000 and 2,000 Palestinian prisoners were imprisoned there, most in administrative detention without trial.

In February 1989, a large-scale riot broke out in the prison, following the cancellation of family visits, hundreds of prisoners tried to climb fences. The military police opened fire, killing one and wounding 20. Following further escape attempts that took place in the prison following the riot, including the digging of escape tunnels, a deep moat filled with concrete was dug around it.

On February 5, 2005, the prison was transferred to the responsibility of the Israel Prison Service, and the construction of permanent wings began as a replacement for the temporary tents erected on the facility.

== Allegations of human rights abuses ==
Human rights organizations and prisoners have reported human rights abuses against Palestinian prisoners in the facility, particularly following the events of October 7, 2023. Reports have cited systematic torture, violence, medical neglect, and inadequate living conditions.

On 23 February 2013, Arafat Jaradat, a 30-year-old Palestinian who had been arrested by the Shin Bet 5 days earlier died in the Megiddo Prison. The cause of death is disputed, according to the Palestinians he died as a result of torture, while Israel said Jaradat died as a result of heart failure.

In September 2024 photos and videos revealed Israeli security guards mistreating Palestinian prisoners at the Megiddo Prison. Since the outbreak of the war, Palestinian detainees, as well as those with Israeli citizenship, reported in numerous cases being subject to humiliation, starvation, medical neglect, violence and torture. An unnamed senior Israeli Prisons Service official acknowledged to the media that there is "severe violence" against prisoners, while the service described procedures as "routine".

On 24 March 2025, it was reported that 17 year-old Palestinian prisoner Walid Khaled Abdullah Ahmad had died in unknown circumstances in Megiddo. The Palestinian Prisoners Club NGO stated he was the 63rd Palestinian to die in an Israeli jail since the beginning of the Gaza war. It was later discovered that he died from signs of "starvation, dehydration from colitis-induced diarrhea, and infectious complications all compounded by prolonged malnutrition and denial of life saving medical intervention", according to the Defense for Children International – Palestine.

== Megiddo church and mosaic ==
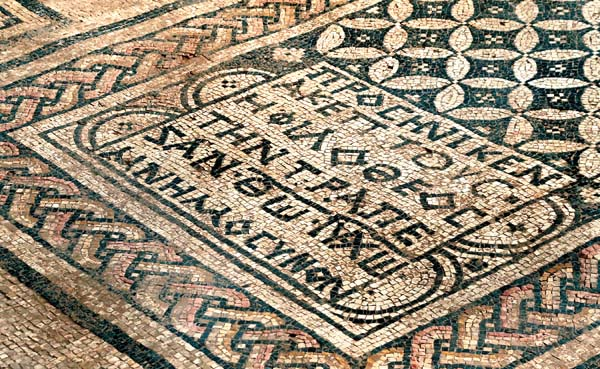
Meggido Mosaic

At the end of 2005, as part of an archaeological dig at the Legio site on the depopulated Palestinian village of Lajjun, which is within the prison's boundaries, a mosaic and the remains of a building were found, which are apparently the oldest church in the world. In July 2006, the Israeli government decided, because of the historical importance of the site, that the prison would be vacated in favor of a tourist site. In December 2009, the local planning and construction committee approved a plan to relocate the prison 2 km to the west, in order to open the remains of the church to visitors. In October 2014, the National Planning and Construction Councilapproved an amendment to the national outline plan for prisons in Israel (TMA 24), for the new location of the prison.

In the summer of 2023, requests came from the Vatican and the Museum of the Bible (Washington) to move the mosaic from its place and display it in exhibitions in Rome or Washington. The Museum of the Bible was ultimately chosen, and the exhibition opened on July 25, 2025.

== Notable prisoners ==
- Marwan Barghouti
- Raja Eghbaria
- Mosab Hassan Yousef

== Literature ==
- Hagar Shezaf: Malnutrition, Illness and Death—The Routine for Palestinian Prisoners at Israel’s Megiddo Prison. In: Haaretz, 6 July 2025.
