= Megiddo Church =

US religious denomination

Coordinates: 42.1351°N 77.6506°W

The Megiddo Mission or Megiddo Church is a small American Restorationist denomination founded by L. T. Nichols in 1880 in Rochester, New York. The church's magazine is the Megiddo Message.

Lemuel T. Nichols was born on October 1, 1844, Goshen, Indiana near Elkhart, Indiana and was named after his father, Lemuel Truesdale Nichols Sr. – though it appears that the younger Nichols never used his given names. He founded his church in 1880. Nichols conceived an idea of spreading his message by cruising the Mississippi, the Ohio, and their tributaries in a three-deck steamboat, named the Megiddo. When Nichols died on 28 February 1912 at Battle Creek, Michigan, he was quickly succeeded by his assistant Maud Hembree, a female former Catholic convert from Oregon, who took over as pastor. Hembree died in 1935 and was succeeded as pastor of the Rochester church and editor of the magazine by Ella Skeels, Nichols's sister.

== Beliefs ==
The Megiddo Church denies the doctrine of the Trinity; Jesus is considered God's son and the Holy Spirit is seen as a divine power not a person. They also deny the immortality of the soul, and believe in resurrection of the dead and judgment at the return of Christ. The church does not practice water baptism and practices communion once a year at Passover. Nichols expected the return of Elijah and rejected the idea of a new Elijah. Nichols is held in the highest esteem by the members of the Megiddo Church, and his birthday, October 1, is celebrated as a holiday second only in importance to Christmas.
