= List of That Time I Got Reincarnated as a Slime volumes =

That Time I Got Reincarnated as a Slime is a Japanese light novel series written by Fuse and illustrated by Mitz Vah. The series is published in Japanese by Micro Magazine and in English by Yen Press. A manga adaptation by Taiki Kawakami is published in Japanese by Kodansha and in English by their subsidiary Kodansha USA. A spin-off manga by Shō Okagiri, titled That Time I Got Reincarnated as a Slime: The Ways of the Monster Nation, is published digitally by Micro Magazine.

== Light novels ==
| No. | Original release date | Original ISBN | English release date | English ISBN |
|---|---|---|---|---|
| 1 | May 30, 2014 | 978-4-89637-459-9 | December 19, 2017 | 978-0-316-41420-3 |
Prologue: "Death and Reincarnation"; Chapter 1: "My First Friend"; "The Girl and the Demon Lord"; Chapter 2: "Battle of the Goblin Village"; "The Girl and the Titan"; Chapter 3: "Through the Dwarven Kingdom"; "The Girl and the Hero"; Chapter 4: "The Conqueror of Flames"; Final Chapter: "The Inherited Form"; Side Story: "Gobta's Big Adventure"
| 2 | August 30, 2014 | 978-4-89637-473-5 | April 24, 2018 | 978-1-9753-0111-8 |
Chapter 1: "The Start of the Mayhem"; Chapter 2: "Evolutions and Clashes"; Chapter 3: "The Envoy and the Meeting"; Chapter 4: "Disengaging Gears"; Chapter 5: "The Great Clash"; Chapter 6: "The Devourer of All"; Chapter 7: "The Great Forest of Jura Alliance"; Final Chapter: "A Relaxing Spot"
| 3 | December 24, 2014 | 978-4-89637-488-9 | August 21, 2018 | 978-1-9753-0113-2 |
Prologue: "The Demon Lord Summit"; Chapter 1: "The Name of a Nation"; Chapter 2: "The Demon Lord Invades"; Chapter 3: "The Congregation"; Chapter 4: "The Advancing Malice"; Chapter 5: "Charybdis"; Epilogue: "A New Artifice"
| 4 | April 30, 2015 | 978-4-89637-502-2 | December 11, 2018 | 978-1-9753-0114-9 |
Prologue: "Beauty in Action"; Chapter 1: "Trading with the Beast Kingdom"; Chapter 2: "King Gazel's Invitation"; Chapter 3: "To Human Lands"; Chapter 4: "The Kingdom of Blumund"; Chapter 5: "The Summoned Children"; Chapter 6: "Conquering the Labyrinth"; Chapter 7: "Rescued Souls"; Epilogue: "A Monster's Natural Enemy"
| 5 | May 30, 2015 | 978-4-89637-507-7 | April 23, 2019 | 978-1-9753-0116-3 |
Prologue: "The Day of Ruin"; Chapter 1: "Calmer Days"; Chapter 2: "Prelude to Calamity"; Chapter 3: "Despair and Hope"; Chapter 4: "The Birth of a Demon Lord"; Chapter 5: "The Unleashed"; Epilogue: "The String-Puller in the Shadows"
| 6 | October 30, 2015 | 978-4-89637-538-1 | August 20, 2019 | 978-1-9753-0118-7 |
Prologue: "The Magic-Born's Ruse"; Chapter 1: "Between Monster and Man"; Chapter 2: "Word from Ramiris"; Chapter 3: "The Eve of Battle"; Interlude: "The Demon Lords"; Chapter 4: "In the Land of Destiny"; Chapter 5: "Walpurgis"; Chapter 6: "The Octagram"; Epilogue: "In the Holy Land"
| 7 | April 28, 2016 | 978-4-89637-561-9 | December 24, 2019 | 978-1-9753-0120-0 |
Prologue: "The Magic-Born Memorial"; Chapter 1: "Demons and Schemes"; Chapter 2: "Roles to Uphold"; Chapter 3: "The Saint's Anticipation"; Interlude: "A Private Chat"; Chapter 4: "The Second Confrontation"; Chapter 5: "Holy and Demonic Collide"; Chapter 6: "Gods and Demon Lords"; Epilogue: "A New Relationship"
| 8 | August 30, 2016 | 978-4-89637-577-0 | May 19, 2020 | 978-1-9753-1299-2 |
Prologue: "A Status Report"; Chapter 1: "Reconciliation and Agreement"; Chapter 2: "The Invitees"; Chapter 3: "The Preparations"; Chapter 4: "The Audiences"; Epilogue: "The Final Briefing"
| 8.5 | August 30, 2016 | 978-4-89637-580-0 | — | — |
| 9 | November 30, 2016 | 978-4-89637-600-5 | November 3, 2020 | 978-1-9753-1437-8 |
Prologue: "The Lightspeed Hero"; Chapter 1: "The Eve of the Festival"; Interlude: "A Late-Night Meeting"; Chapter 2: "The Founder's Festival"; Interlude: "A Problem Arises"; Chapter 3: "The Battle Tournament"; Interlude: "The Midnight Conference"; Chapter 4: "The Final Round and the Labyrinth's Grand Opening"; Chapter 5: "After the Festival"; Epilogue: "Flames of Avarice"
| 10 | April 7, 2017 | 978-4-89637-630-2 | January 19, 2021 | 978-1-9753-1439-2 |
Prologue: "Those Who Set Things in Motion"; Chapter 1: "A Brisk Labyrinth Business"; Chapter 2: "Lively Days"; Interlude: "Maribel"; Chapter 3: "The Council"; Chapter 4: "Behind the Curtain"; Chapter 5: "The Trap of Greed"; Epilogue: "The One Who Laughs Last"
| 11 | December 8, 2017 | 978-4-89637-678-4 | June 22, 2021 | 978-1-9753-1441-5 |
Prologue: "A Golden Depression"; Chapter 1: "Observation, Research, Results"; Chapter 2: "New Companions"; Chapter 3: "A Disturbing Presence"; Chapter 4: "Upheaval in the West"; Chapter 5: "The Hero Awakens"; Epilogue: "To the Promised Land"
| 12 | March 9, 2018 | 978-4-89637-698-2 | November 9, 2021 | 978-1-9753-1443-9 |
Prologue: "The Jesters' Escape"; Chapter 1: "The Sound of Soldiers' Boots"; Chapter 2: "Accomplishments and Preparation"; Interlude: "A Look Inside the Empire"; Chapter 3: "The Imperial Guests"; Chapter 4: "The Empire Makes Its Move"; Chapter 5: "Toward the Opening of Battle"; Epilogue: "The Emperor's Conquest"
| 13 | September 28, 2018 | 978-4-89637-816-0 | April 5, 2022 | 978-1-9753-1445-3 |
Prologue: "Two Misgivings"; Chapter 1: "Unrest and Resolve"; Chapter 2: "The Assault Begins"; Interlude: "Gazel's Melancholy"; Chapter 3: "Battle of the Labyrinth"; Chapter 4: "Total Victory"; Epilogue: "The Deeds of a Demon Lord"
| 13.5 | January 30, 2019 | 978-4-89637-845-0 | — | — |
| 14 | March 29, 2019 | 978-4-89637-862-7 | July 26, 2022 | 978-1-9753-1447-7 |
Prologue: "The Clowns' Decision"; Chapter 1: "Rewards and Evolutions"; Interlude: "The Outrageous Celebration"; Chapter 2: "Future Directions"; Interlude: "The Game Among the Heavens"; Chapter 3: "Capital in Turmoil"; Chapter 4: "The Red Purge"; Epilogue: "Rage"
| 15 | September 28, 2019 | 978-4-89637-923-5 | November 22, 2022 | 978-1-9753-1449-1 |
Prologue: "Flame Dragon Against Storm Dragon"; Chapter 1: "The Moment of Despair"; Chapter 2: "Power Unbound"; Chapter 3: "The Battlefield Rages"; Chapter 4: "The Eight Impervious Gates"; Chapter 5: "The Truth Behind the Emperor"; Epilogue: "Sister and Brother"
| 16 | March 27, 2020 | 978-4-89637-989-1 | August 22, 2023 | 978-1-9753-6975-0 |
Prologue: "The Collapse of All Order"; Chapter 1: "Behind the Betrayal"; Chapter 2: "The Interviews"; Chapter 3: "Towards Rebuilding"; Epilogue: "Guy Crimson"
| 17 | September 30, 2020 | 978-4-86716-056-5 | December 12, 2023 | 978-1-9753-7553-9 |
Chapter 1: "Mjöllmile's Ambition"; Chapter 2: "Faraway Memories"; Chapter 3: "Days of Upheaval"; Chapter 4: "Mumblings of a Blue Demon"; Special Bonus: "Vester Needs Your Advice
| 18 | March 31, 2021 | 978-4-86716-122-7 | April 16, 2024 | 978-1-9753-7555-3 |
Prologue: "The Clandestine Meeting"; Chapter 1: "The Walpurgis Council"; Interlude: "Heavenly Emperor and Ex-Hero"; Chapter 2: "Brief Normalcy"; Chapter 3: "The Clowns Reminisce"; Chapter 4: "Ambitions Shattered"; Epilogue: "End of a Dream"
| 19 | November 30, 2021 | 978-4-86716-203-3 | August 20, 2024 | 978-1-9753-7557-7 |
Prologue: "The Angel Lord Moves"; Chapter 1: "The First Skirmish"; Interlude: "Forces of Justice"; Chapter 2: "Beginning of the War"; Chapter 3: "Capital In Flames"; Chapter 4: "Gathering of the Greats"; Epilogue: "The Evolving Evil"
| 20 | September 30, 2022 | 978-4-86716-339-9 | March 11, 2025 | 978-1-9753-7559-1 |
Prologue: "Feldway"; Chapter 1: "The First of the Final"; Chapter 2: "Reports and Countermeasures"; Chapter 3: "Attacked by Titans"; Chapter 4: "Battle of the Divine Tree"; Epilogue: "Rimuru Vanishes"
| 21 | October 30, 2023 | 978-4-86716-488-4 | July 8, 2025 | 979-8-8554-0337-4 |
Prologue: "Moment of Resolve"; Chapter 1: "The Falling City"; Interlude: "King of the Insects"; Chapter 2: "A Labyrinth Corroded"; Chapter 3: "Parent and Child"; Chapter 4: "The Far Reaches of Delusion"; Epilogue: "Beyond the Demise"
| 22 | January 30, 2025 | 978-4-86716-707-6 | February 10, 2026 | 979-8-8554-2506-2 |
Prologue: "Pure Spite"; Chapter 1: "The Lord of Vice"; Chapter 2: "Moment of Despair"; Chapter 3: "The Duel to End All Duels"; Epilogue: "The Evil God Awakens"
| 23 | November 29, 2025 | 978-4-86716-873-8 | March 9, 2027 | 979-8-8554-4734-7 |

== Manga ==
=== That Time I Got Reincarnated as a Slime ===
| No. | Original release date | Original ISBN | English release date | English ISBN |
|---|---|---|---|---|
| 1 | October 30, 2015 | 978-4-06-376578-6 | August 22, 2017 | 978-1-63236-506-4 |
1. "Death and Reincarnation" (死亡～そして転生, Shibō ~ Soshite Tensei); 2. "Guardian of the Goblin Village" (ゴブリン村の守護者, Goburin-mura no Gādian); 3. "Master of the Direwolves" (牙狼族の主, Kibaōkami-zoku no Omo); 4. "Head for the Dwarf Kingdom" (目指せドワーフ王国, Mezase Dowāfu Ōkoku); 5. "The Dwarven Craftsman" (ドワーフの職人, Dowāfu no Shokunin); 6. "The Fated One" (運命の人, Unmei no Hito); "Veldora's Slime Observation Journal" (ヴェルドラのスライム観察日記, Verudora no Suraimu Kansatsu Nikki)
| 2 | April 28, 2016 | 978-4-06-390623-3 | October 31, 2017 | 978-1-63236-507-1 |
7. "The Hero-King's Judgement" (英雄王の審判, Eiyū-ō no Shinpan); 8. "A Familiar Scent" (懐かしい香り, Natsukashī Kaori); 9. "Demon of Flames" (炎の魔人, Honō no Majin); 10. "Inherited Will" (受け継がれる想い, Uketsuga Reru Omoi); 11. "The Upheaval Begins" (争乱の始まり, Sōran no Hajimari); "Veldora's Slime Observation Journal" (ヴェルドラのスライム観察日記, Verudora no Suraimu Kansatsu Nikki)
| 3 | November 30, 2016 | 978-4-06-390666-0; 978-4-06-397020-3 (SE) | December 26, 2017 | 978-1-63236-508-8 |
12. "Mighty Foes in the Forest of Jura" (ジュラの森の強者, Jura no Mori no Tsuwamono); 13. "Ogre Attack" (大鬼族の襲撃, Dai Kizoku no Shūgeki); 14. "The Ogres' Story" (大鬼族の事情, Dai Kizoku no Jijō); 15. "An Anomaly in the Forest" (大森林の異変, Dai Shinrin no Ihen); 16. "Gabiru Arrives!" (ガビル参上!, Gabiru Sanjō!); 17. "Gobta vs. Gabiru" (ゴブタ VS ガビル, Gobuta VS Gabiru); "Veldora's Slime Observation Journal" (ヴェルドラのスライム観察日記, Verudora no Suraimu Kansatsu Nikki)
| 4 | April 7, 2017 | 978-4-06-390693-6 | February 20, 2018 | 978-1-63236-638-2 |
18. "Loosening Gears" (狂いゆく歯車, Kurui Yuku Haguruma); 19. "False Superiority" (偽りの優勢, Itsuwari no Yūsei); 20. "The March to War" (出陣の關, Shutsujin no Seki); 21. "Ripples on the Battlefield" (戦場に生じた波紋, Senjō ni Shōjita Hamon); 22. "Death Storm" (黒雷嵐, Kuroikazuchi Arashi); "Veldora's Slime Observation Journal" (ヴェルドラのスライム観察日記, Verudora no Suraimu Kansatsu Nikki)
| 5 | September 8, 2017 | 978-4-06-390728-5; 978-4-06-397050-0 (SE) | April 17, 2018 | 978-1-63236-639-9 |
23. "Orc Disaster" (オーク・ディザスター, Ōku Dizasutā); 24. "The Submissive Demon Lord" (心服の魔王, Shinpuku no Maō); 25. "That Which Devours All" (全てを喰らう者, Subete o Kurau Mono); 26. "The Jura Forest Alliance" (ジュラの森大同盟, Jura no Mori Dai Dōmei); 27. "A Place to Relax" (安らげる場所, Yasurageru Basho); "Veldora's Slime Observation Journal" (ヴェルドラのスライム観察日記, Verudora no Suraimu Kansatsu Nikki)
| 6 | December 8, 2017 | 978-4-06-510505-4 | June 19, 2018 | 978-1-63236-640-5 |
28. "Attention on the Town of Monsters" (魔物の町に注目する者たち, Mamono no Machi ni Chūmoku Suru Mono-tachi); 29. "Demon Lord Council" (魔王会談, Maō Kaidan); 30. "A Place of Rest" (安らげる場所, Yasurageru Basho); 31. "Milim the Whirlwind (Part 1)" ((ミリム旋風(前編), Mirimu Senpū (Zenpen)); "Veldora's Slime Observation Journal" (ヴェルドラのスライム観察日記, Verudora no Suraimu Kansatsu Nikki)
| 7 | March 9, 2018 | 978-4-06-511098-0 | August 21, 2018 | 978-1-63236-641-2 |
32. "Milim the Whirlwind (Part 2)" (ミリム旋風（後編）, Mirimu Senpū (Kōhen)); 33. "The Demon Lords' Plot" (魔王達の企み, Maō-tachi no Takurami); 34. "Visitors to the Land of Monsters" (魔物の国に集う者達, Mamono no Kuni ni Tsudou-mono-tachi); 35. "Youm: From Chump to Champ" (ヨウム英雄化計画, Yōmu Eiyū-ka Keikaku); "Veldora's Slime Observation Journal" (ヴェルドラのスライム観察日記, Verudora no Suraimu Kansatsu Nikki)
| 8 | June 8, 2018 | 978-4-06-511672-2; 978-4-06-512501-4 (SE) | October 16, 2018 | 978-1-63236-729-7 |
36. "Dispatch from the Overseer" (管理者の急報, Kanrisha no Kyūhō); 37. "Charybdis" (暴風大妖渦(カリュフディス), Karyufudisu); 38. "Tyrant of Destruction" (破壊の暴君, Hakai no Bōkun); 39. "As a Nation" (国家として, Kokka Toshite); "Veldora's Slime Observation Journal" (ヴェルドラのスライム観察日記, Verudora no Suraimu Kansatsu Nikki)
| 9 | September 28, 2018 | 978-4-06-512742-1; 978-4-06-513500-6 (SE) | March 12, 2019 | 978-1-63236-747-1 |
40. "Trade with the Animal Kingdom" (獣王国との交易, Kemono Ōkoku to no Kōeki); 41. "King Gazel's Invitation (Part One)" (ガゼル王の招待（前編）, Gazeru-ō no Shōtai (Zenpen)); 42. "King Gazel's Invitation (Part Two)" (ガゼル王の招待（後編）, Gazeru-ō no Shōtai (Kōhen)); 43. "To the Human Kingdom" (人間の国へ, Ningen no Kuni e); "Veldora's Slime Observation Journal" (ヴェルドラのスライム観察日記, Verudora no Suraimu Kansatsu Nikki)
| 10 | December 7, 2018 | 978-4-06-513916-5; 978-4-06-514674-3 (SE) | June 11, 2019 | 978-1-63236-748-8 |
44. "In the Kingdom of Blumund (Part One)" (ブルムンド王国にて（前編）, Burumundo Ōkoku Nite (Zenpen)); 45. "In the Kingdom of Blumund (Part Two)" (ブルムンド王国にて（後編）, Burumundo Ōkoku Nite (Kōhen)); 46. "Yuuki Kagurazaka" (ユウキ・カグラザカ, Yūki kagurazaka); 47. "Failed Heroes" (勇者のなり損ない, Yūsha no Nari Sokonai); "Veldora's Slime Observation Journal" (ヴェルドラのスライム観察日記, Verudora no Suraimu Kansatsu Nikki)
| 11 | March 29, 2019 | 978-4-06-514780-1 | October 15, 2019 | 978-1-63236-749-5 |
48. "Teaching Job" (先生のお仕事, Sensei no Oshigoto); 49. "Gard Mjöllmile the Merchant" (大商人ガルド・ミョルマイル, Ōakindo Garudo Myorumairu); 50. "Dwelling of the Spirits" (精霊の棲家, Seirei no Sumika); 51. "Spirit Queen" (精霊の女王, Seirei no Joō); 52. "Salvation of the Soul" (救われる魂, Sukuwareru Tamashii); "Veldora's Slime Observation Journal" (ヴェルドラのスライム観察日記, Verudora no Suraimu Kansatsu Nikki)
| 12 | July 9, 2019 | 978-4-06-516205-7; 978-4-06-513935-6 (SE) | March 17, 2020 | 978-1-63236-926-0 |
53. "Mjurran the Witch" (魔女ミュウラン, Majo Myuuran); 54. "Prelude to Calamity" (災厄の前奏曲, Saiyaku no Pureryūdo); 55. "Natural Enemy of Monsters" (魔物の天敵, Mamono no Tenteki); 56. "Entangled Intentions" (絡み合う思惑, Karamiau Omowaku); 57. "Bringer of Misfortune" (災いの来訪者, Wazawai no Raihō-sha); 58. "Disaster" (災禍, Saika); "Veldora's Slime Observation Journal" (ヴェルドラのスライム観察日記, Verudora no Suraimu Kansatsu Nikki)
| 13 | December 4, 2019 | 978-4-06-517764-8; 978-4-06-514032-1 (SE) | June 16, 2020 | 978-1-64651-007-8 |
59. "Despair and Hope" (絶望と希望, Zetsubō to Kibō); 60. "The Conditions for Hope" (希望の条件, Kibō no Jōken); 61. "The Witch's Punishment" (魔女の処罰, Majo no Shobatsu); 62. "Whether Monster or Human" (魔物であれ人間であれ, Mamono de are Ningen de are); 63. "Moment of Counterattack" (逆襲の刻, Gyakushū no Toki); "Veldora's Slime Observation Journal" (ヴェルドラのスライム観察日記, Verudora no Suraimu Kansatsu Nikki)
| 14 | March 27, 2020 | 978-4-06-518759-3; 978-4-06-514033-8 (SE) | November 3, 2020 | 978-1-64651-074-0 |
64. "Difference in Class" (格の違い, Kaku no Chigai); 65. "Megiddo" (神之怒(メギド), Megido); 66. "Merciless" (心無者(ムジヒナルモノ), Mujihinarumono); 67. "The Worshipping Demon" (敬愛の悪魔, Keiai no Akuma); "Veldora's Slime Observation Journal" (ヴェルドラのスライム観察日記, Verudora no Suraimu Kansatsu Nikki)
| 15 | July 9, 2020 | 978-4-06-520127-5; 978-4-06-514034-5 (SE) | December 15, 2020 | 978-1-64651-075-7 |
68. "Birth of a Demon Lord" (魔王誕生, Maō Tanjō); 69. "Tempest Revival Festival" (テンペスト復活祭, Tenpesuto Fukkatsu-sai); 70. "The Day of Eurazania's Fall" (獣王国(ユーラザニア)、滅びの日, Yūrazania, Horobi no Hi); 65.5. "Clover at Death's Door" (今際の際にシロツメクサ, Imawanokiwa ni Shirotsumekusa): "Veldora's Slime Observation Journal" (ヴェルドラのスライム観察日記, Verudora no Suraimu Kansatsu Nikki)
| 16 | November 27, 2020 | 978-4-06-521244-8; 978-4-06-518334-2 (SE) | June 29, 2021 | 978-1-64651-169-3 |
71. "The Unleashed" (解き放たれし者, Tokihanata Reshi Mono); 72. "Swirling Plots" (渦巻く陰謀, Uzumaku Inbō); 73. "A Conspiracy of Majin" (魔人達の策謀, Majin-tachi no Sakubō); 74. "Monster-and-Man Summit I" (人魔会談1, Jinma Kaidan 1); "Veldora's Slime Observation Journal" (ヴェルドラのスライム観察日記, Verudora no Suraimu Kansatsu Nikki)
| 17 | March 31, 2021 | 978-4-06-522558-5; 978-4-06-523052-7 (SE) | October 5, 2021 | 978-1-64651-232-4 |
75. "Monster-and-Man Summit II" (人魔会談2, Jinma Kaidan 2); 76. "Demon Lord and True Dragon" (魔王と竜種, Maō to Ryūshu); 77. "Eve of Battle" (会戦前夜, Kaisen Zenya); 78. "Walpurgis" (魔王達の宴（ワルプルギス）, Maō-tachi no Utage (Warupurugisu)); 79. "Battle" (会戦, Kaisen)
| 18 | July 8, 2021 | 978-4-06-523837-0; 978-4-06-523838-7 (SE) | December 14, 2021 | 978-1-64651-307-9 |
80. "Return of the Beast" (大妖の再来, Taiyō no Sairai); 81. "Wight King" (死霊の王, Shiryō no Ō); 82. "A Demon's Loyalty" (悪魔の忠誠, Akuma no Chūsei); 83. "The Crazed Clown" (喜狂の道化（クレイジーピエロ）, Kikyō no Dōke (Kureijī Piero))
| 19 | December 9, 2021 | 978-4-06-526034-0 | June 28, 2022 | 978-1-64651-436-6 |
84. "The Moderate Harlequin Alliance" (中庸道化連, Chūyō Dōke Ren); 85. "In a Holy Place" (聖なる場所で, Seinaru Basho de); 86. "The Octagram" (八星魔王, Hachi Hoshi Maō); 87. "The Right Hand of God" (神の右手, Kami no Migite); Bonus Chapter. "Gourmet Road" (グルメロード, Gurumerōdo)
| 20 | March 9, 2022 | 978-4-06-527091-2; 978-4-06-527100-1 (SE) | October 4, 2022 | 978-1-64651-596-7 |
88. "Demons and Machinations" (悪魔と謀略, Akuma to Bōryaku); 89. "Monster Federation and Holy Empire" (魔国連邦と神聖法皇国, Makoku Renpō to Shinseihō Kōkoku); 90. "The Saint's Idea" (聖人の思惑, Seijin no Omowaku); 91. "Thinking of Home" (同郷を想う, Dōkyō o Omō); 92. "The Second Confrontation" (二度目の対峙, Nidome no Taiji)
| 21 | July 7, 2022 | 978-4-06-528494-0; 978-4-06-528492-6 (SE) | March 28, 2023 | 978-1-64651-720-6 |
93. "Clash of the Holy and Monstrous" (聖魔激突, Shōma Gekitotsu); 94. "The Grin of the Ancient Demon" (古き悪魔の微笑み, Furuki Akuma no Hohoemi); 95. "The Wise Ones' Scheme" (賢人の目論見, Kenjin no Mokuromi); 96. "God and Demon Lord" (神と魔王, Kami to Maō)
| 22 | December 8, 2022 | 978-4-06-529915-9 | July 25, 2023 | 978-1-64651-721-3 |
97. "Death Blessing" (死せる者への祝福, Shiserumono e no Shukufuku); 98. "Status Report" (経過報告, Keika Hōkoku); 99. "Compromise and Agreement 1" (和解と協定1, Wakai to Kyōtei 1); 100. "Compromise and Agreement 2" (和解と協定2, Wakai to Kyōtei 2); 101. "Compromise and Agreement 2.5" (和解と協定2.5, Wakai to Kyōtei 2.5)
| 23 | May 9, 2023 | 978-4-06-531626-9; 978-4-06-531625-2 (SE) | December 19, 2023 | 978-1-64651-907-1 |
102. "Many Invitations" (各国と招待状, Kakkoku to Jōtaijō); 103. "The Labyrinth Master" (迷宮妖精, Meikyū Yōsei); 104. "Preparing for the Festival" (開催準備, Kaisai Junbi); 105. "The Tengu's Budding Relationship" (長鼻族(テング), Tengu no Naresome)
| 24 | September 8, 2023 | 978-4-06-532861-3; 978-4-06-533092-0 (SE) | May 14, 2024 | 979-8-88877-236-2 |
106. "Royal Audiences" (謁見式, Ekkenshiki); 107. "The Lightspeed Hero" (閃光の勇者, Senkō no Yūsha); 108. "Eve of the Founder's Festival" (開国祭前夜, Kaikokusai Zen'ya); 109. "Reunion and Introduction" (再会と出会い, Saikai to Deai)
| 25 | January 9, 2024 | 978-4-06-534117-9; 978-4-06-534118-6 (SE) | December 17, 2024 | 979-8-88877-306-2 |
110. "The Greatness of Food" (食の功績, Shoku no Kōseki); 111. "The Founder's Festival" (開国祭, Kaikokusai); 112. "A Problem Arises" (問題発生, Mondai Hassei); 113. "The Fighting Tournament" (武闘大会, Butō Taikai)
| 26 | June 7, 2024 | 978-4-06-535745-3; 978-4-06-535686-9 (SE) | May 27, 2025 | 979-8-88877-457-1 |
114. "The Big Three" (三巨頭会談, San Kyotōkaidan); 115. "The Final and a Chat" (決勝戦と談話, Kesshōsen to Danwa); 116. "The Dungeon is Open" (迷宮解放, Meikyū Kaihō); 117. "Dungeon Crawling" (迷宮探索, Meikyū Tansaku)
| 27 | September 9, 2024 | 978-4-06-536687-5; 978-4-06-537170-1 (SE) | September 23, 2025 | 979-8-88877-533-2 |
118. Matsuri no Ato (祭りの後); 119. Junchōna Meikyū un'ei (順調な迷宮運営); 120. Suraimu no Kyōi (スライムの脅威)
| 28 | January 30, 2025 | 978-4-06-538016-1; 978-4-06-538390-2 (SE) | December 23, 2025 | 979-8-88877-626-1 |
121. Hyōgi-kai ni Mukete (評議会にむけて); 122. Ingurashia e (イングラシアへ); 123. Konton no Hyōgi-kai (混沌の評議会); 124. Konton no Hyōgi-kai 2 (混沌の評議会 2)
| 29 | June 6, 2025 | 978-4-06-539688-9 | March 31, 2026 | 979-8-88877-723-7 |
125. Kuromaku no Shōtai (黒幕の正体); 126. Gōyoku no Wana (強欲の罠); 127. Kodai Toshi Amurita (古代都市アムリタ); 128. Gōyoku no Mariaberu (強欲のマリアベル)
| 30 | October 9, 2025 | 978-4-06-541056-1 | October 27, 2026 | 979-8-88877-915-6 |
129. Kutsujoku no maku hiki (屈辱の幕引き); 130. Saigo ni warau mono (最後に笑う者); 131. Ōgon no yūutsu (黄金の憂鬱); 132. Shisatsu to kenkyū seika (視察と研究成果)
| 31 | February 9, 2026 | 978-4-06-542384-4; 978-4-06-542550-3 (SE) | — | — |
133. Akuma no sasayaki (悪魔の囁き); 134. Atarashī nakamatachi (新しい仲間達); 135. Kokushoku gundan (黒色軍団); 136. Kodomo-tachi no seichō (子供達の成長)
| 32 | June 9, 2026 | 978-4-06-543754-4; 978-4-06-543920-3 (SE) | — | — |
137. Guranberu Rozzo (グランベル・ロッゾ); 138. Seihō Dōran (西方動乱); 139. Seihō Dōran 2 (西方動乱2); 140. Seihō Dōran 3 (西方動乱3)
| 33 | October 8, 2026 | 978-4-06-545119-9; 978-4-06-545435-0 (SE) | — | — |

=== That Time I Got Reincarnated as a Slime: The Ways of the Monster Nation ===
| No. | Original release date | Original ISBN | English release date | English ISBN |
|---|---|---|---|---|
| 1 | April 7, 2017 | 978-4-89637-628-9 | July 21, 2020 | 978-1-9753-1350-0 |
1. "Food-Stall Takoyaki ☆ Three Stars!!" (屋台のタコヤキで☆3つ!!, Yatai no Takoyaki de ☆ 3tsu!!); 2. "Kimono Shop ☆ Three Stars!!" (呉服屋さんで☆3つ!!, Gofukuya-san de ☆ 3tsu!!); 3. "Blacksmith Shop ☆ Three Stars!!" (鍛冶屋さんで☆3つ!!, Kajiya-san de ☆ 3tsu!!); 4. "Highway Wagon Trip ☆ Three Stars!!" (街道の馬車旅で☆3つ!!, Kaidō no Basha Tabi de ☆ 3tsu!!); 5. "That Light Feeling of Inebriation ☆ Three Stars!!" (ほろ酔い気分で☆3つ!!, Horoyoi Kibun de ☆ 3tsu!!); 6. "Dungeon Exploration ☆ Three Stars!!" (地下迷宮探索で☆3つ!!, Chika Meikyū Tansaku de ☆ 3tsu!!); 7. "Dungeon Exploration ☆ Three Stars!! (Part 2)" (地下迷宮探索で☆3つ!! 2☆目！, Chika Meikyū Tansaku de ☆ 3tsu!! 2 ☆ Moku!)
Framea, a member of the Rabbitfolk tribe with a Unique Skill that allows her to analyze and sense aesthetics, is hired by Demon Lord Rimuru Tempest to create a guidebook for visitors of the Jura Tempest Federation after he found her notepad reviewing anything with a star rating. She visits a kimono shop where she receives a dress made by Shuna and a hat from a human employee. After watching a training of Rimuru's army, Framea visits the blacksmith shop with Gobta, where Kaijin recommends several weapons until she settles with a boomerang. Framea is then tasked to escort Kabal, Gido, and Elen from the Kingdom of Blumund to Tempest. On their way, a monster attacks them, but Framea protects the trio until Diablo reveals himself to be testing her per Rimuru's order. Framea is then tasked by Rimuru to explore Tempest's dungeon made by Demon Lord Ramiris along with Kabal, Gido, and Elen to create its guidebook for adventurers. Rimuru hosts a kick-off party, during which Framea feels tipsy after drinking the distilled fruit wine given by Shion. Inside the dungeon, Framea and Kabal's party defeat the boss monster on the 10th floor and manage to reach the 21st floor, where they fall into a trap to their apparent death.
| 2 | December 8, 2017 | 978-4-89637-684-5 | November 3, 2020 | 978-1-9753-1353-1 |
8. "Explorers' Rest Stop ☆ Three Stars!!" (探索者の休憩所で☆3つ!!, Tansaku-sha no Kyūkeisho de ☆ 3tsu!!); 9. "Open-Air Bath ☆ Three Stars!!" (露天風呂で☆3つ!!, Rotenburo de ☆ 3tsu!!); 10. "Blacksmith District ☆ Three Stars!!" (鍛冶屋街で☆3つ!!, Kajiya Machi de ☆ 3tsu!!); 11. "Journey Through the Sky ☆ Three Stars!!" (空の旅で☆3つ!!, Sora no Tabi de ☆ 3tsu!!); 12. "Commemorative Photo ☆ Three Stars!!" (記念写真で☆3つ!!, Kinen Shashin de ☆ 3tsu!!); 13. "Test of Mettle ☆ Three Stars!!" (肝試しで☆3つ!!, Kimodameshi de ☆ 3tsu!!); 14. "Test of Mettle ☆ 3 Stars!! (Part 2)" (肝試しで☆3つ!! 2☆目！, Kimodameshi de ☆ 3tsu!! 2 ☆ Moku!)
Framea and the others are revived with the Revival Bracelet and are resting in an inn located on the dungeon's 95th floor, where they are later treated by Rimuru with food. Framea then joins Shuna and Benimaru in visiting the open-air hot spring bath in the capital city. Arriving at Tempest's blacksmith district, Framea encounters Litus, a Holy Knight of the Western Saints Church, looking for her crush Souei and befriends another Holy Knight named Arnaud Bauman. The trio visits Kurobe and witnesses his disciple forging a sword with enchantment, which later causes an explosion in their workshop. Due to Framea's soon-to-be-released guidebook being too wordy, Rimuru suggests including pictures and invents the camera with Vesta's help. Framea then flies to the sky with Gabil's wyvern to take an aerial photograph of the city. With the camera's invention, a rumor that a picture taken together causes them to become closer than before has begun spreading, causing Shuna and Shion to take a chance to take a picture with Rimuru. Rimuru invites his other subordinates to take a group photo instead. Sometime later, Rimuru wants his students Chloe Aubert, Ryōta Sekiguchi, Kenya Misaki, Alice Rondo, and Gale Gibson to take the test of courage in the Sealed Cave along with Framea and Hinata Sakaguchi. After defeating a serpent monster, the students fight Adalman and his two lackeys, who happen to be Rimuru and Veldora in their avatar forms. During the battle, Rimuru secretly invites Hinata to join them for fun, but he accidentally makes her squeal, which is then poked fun by Veldora. This causes Hinata to attack Veldora and Rimuru, but Adalman manages to stop her for them to retreat, concluding the test.
| 3 | March 9, 2018 | 978-4-89637-701-9 | January 5, 2021 | 978-1-9753-1357-9 |
15. "Top-Shelf Sweets ☆ Three Stars!!" (極上すい一つで☆3つ!!, Gokujō Suītsu de ☆ 3tsu!!); 16. "Sweets Coliseum ☆ 3 Stars!!" (すいーつコロシアムで☆3つ!!, Suītsu Koroshiamu de ☆ 3tsu!!); 17. "Food Judging ☆ 3 Stars!!" (試食審査で☆3つ!!, Shishoku Shinsa de ☆ 3tsu!!); 18. "Kitchen Tour ☆ 3 Stars!!" (厨房見学で☆3つ!!, Chūbō Kengaku de ☆ 3tsu!!); 19. "Class Visit ☆ 3 Stars!!" (体験入学で☆3つ!!, Taiken Nyūgaku de ☆ 3tsu!!); EX. "A Date with Shion ☆ 3 Stars...?" (シオンとデートで☆3つ...？, Shion to Dēto de ☆ 3tsu...?); GB. "Tempest Guidebook (Part 1)" (魔国連邦ガイド その1, Makoku Renpō Gaido Sono 1)
To distribute the first volume of Tempest Guidebook by Framea, Rimuru and Gard Mjöllmile hold a sweets competition in Tempest's Coliseum attended by Demon Lord Luminous Valentine and Pope Emperor Louis Valentin of the Holy Empire Ruberios. Archduke Erald Grimwald of the Sorcerer's Dynasty Sarion, Archduke Schmill Brunn of the Kingdom of Ingrassia, Benimaru, and Demon Lord Milim Nava serve as the judges to Kaoru Yoshida, Ingrassia's royal confectioner Salvado, Shuna, and Shion. Salvado attempts to cheat his ingredients with a narcotic seed, but he is caught off-guard by Framea hosting the event and is convinced by her to rely on his pure skill instead. Kaoru wins the competition with his buttermilk biscuit with brandy sauce. An Orc later approaches Framea for help in becoming Kaoru's apprentice since he becomes inspired by his cooking despite his huge body build. Since he is only specialized in confectionery, Kaoru refers them to Shuna, who then brings them to Tempest's central kitchen and introduces them to chef Gobuichi. Gobuichi helps the Orc to prepare onigiri to serve his fellow Orcs taking a break from construction work. Rimuru suggests the Orc attend Tempest's School to enhance his cooking, with Framea taking a trial enrollment. Framea visits the Sculpture Department, where the students are sculpting Rimuru's figure with his statue from the Coliseum as the model. She discovers the following day that the statue is gone missing. An extra chapter depicts Framea and Shion in a cafe. After eating their order, Shion gives Framea her ominous-looking macaron.
| 4 | September 28, 2018 | 978-4-89637-820-7 | March 30, 2021 | 978-1-9753-1360-9 |
20. "Carving Sculptures ☆ Three Stars!!" (彫刻作りで☆3つ!!, Chōkoku Tsukuri de ☆ 3tsu!!); 21. "Blossom Viewing ☆ Three Stars!!" (お花見日和で☆3つ!!, Ohanami-biyori de ☆ 3tsu!!); 22. "Seaside Bathing ☆ Three Stars!!" (海水浴で☆3つ!!, Kaisuiyoku de ☆ 3tsu!!); 23. "The "Theme Park" ☆ Three Stars!!" (てーまぱーくで☆3つ!!, Tēma Pāku de ☆ 3tsu!!); 24. "Magic Card ☆ Three Stars!!" (魔法のカードで☆3つ!!, Mahō no Kādo de ☆ 3tsu!!)
Ramiris, playing a detective, deduces that Rimuru is the culprit behind the missing statue and begins her investigation. Beretta, who is supervising the Sculpture Department, instructs the class to make a replacement. The class struggles to make a new sculpture since they have not seen Rimuru too much, giving Framea an idea to give them his pictures as their model. Afterward, the Sculpture Department produces numerous sculptures and presents them to Rimuru. Ramiris finally finds Rimuru hiding the sculpture in his house. A few days later, Rimuru invites his subordinates to hanami as a way of making up for the trouble the missing statue he stole had created, with Hinata and Luminous joining them. This causes Milim and Veldora to become jealous as they were not invited, so Rimuru brings them to the beach to make up with them along with Framea, Shuna, Shion, Gobta, Ranga, and Frey. Sometime later, Rimuru suggests building a theme park. Several of his subordinates build attractions for the park, some of which are extreme such as the case of Ramiris' traps in the athletics area and Veldora's massive slingshot. A few days later, Rimuru gives Framea a magic card, similar to a credit card, which she later uses for shopping and eating food. This attracts the attention of Veldora and Ramiris, who both begin to "befriend" Framea.
| 5 | March 29, 2019 | 978-4-89637-865-8 | December 14, 2021 | 978-1-9753-1363-0 |
25. "Easy-Street Noble Life ☆ Three Stars!!" (貴族気分で☆3つ!!, Kizoku Kibun de ☆ 3tsu!!); 26. "Secret Society ☆ Three Stars!!" (秘密組織で☆3つ!!, Himitsu Soshiki de ☆ 3tsu!!); 27. "Clandestine Wining & Dining ☆ Three Stars!!" (秘密の接待で☆3つ!!, Himitsu no Settai de ☆ 3tsu!!); 28. "Special Envoys ☆ Three Stars!!" (お国の特使で☆3つ!!, O-kuni no Tokushi de ☆ 3tsu!!); 29. "Underground Arena ☆ Three Stars!!" (地下闘技場で☆3つ!!, Chika Tōgijō de ☆ 3tsu!!)
Veldora and Ramiris convince Framea of the importance of researching aristocracy for her guidebook, resulting in them eating in a high-end restaurant, purchasing aristocratic clothing and parading it, and reserving a high-class inn. In the end, Rimuru reprimands the trio for overspending and reminds Framea to not fall into Veldora and Ramiris' words. Sometime later, a secret society consisting of Shuna and Shion's fan club begins their meeting. Rimuru assigns Soka to monitor them, who are currently admiring the photos of Shuna and Shion in their swimsuits leaked out by Demon Lord Dino. When the topic discusses Rimuru's worthy consort, Diablo arrives to stop the meeting. Sometime later, envoys from other kingdoms learn about a certain Rabbitfolk living in an extravaganza. They meet with Framea who is being accompanied by Gobta and try to get close to her to become acquainted with Tempest's demon lord, even going by the flirting method. Gobta reports this to Rimuru, who then pretends as a special envoy and Framea's boss to learn more about them. In the end, Gobta reveals Rimuru's true identity as a demon lord. When the envoys reveal how they worry about their small countries' future, Rimuru agrees to interact with them first before discussing their foreign relations. A few weeks later, Veldora agrees with Dino's scheme of him fighting in an underground arena match beneath the Coliseum to earn money. This scheme is later busted by Rimuru after Ramiris reported it, with Dino eating Shion's tonkatsu as his punishment.
| 6 | October 30, 2019 | 978-4-89637-935-8 | January 18, 2022 | 978-1-9753-3988-3 |
30. "Fashion Model ☆ Three Stars!!" (ファッションモデルで☆3つ!!, Fasshon Moderu de ☆ 3tsu!!); 31. "Promo Video ☆ Three Stars!!" (PV撮影で☆3つ!!, PV Satsuei de ☆ 3tsu!!); 32. "Monster Slaying ☆ Three Stars!!" (魔物退治で☆3つ!!, Mamono Taiji de ☆ 3tsu!!); 33. "Dungeon Zoo ☆ Three Stars!!" (動物園で☆3つ!!, Dōbutsuen de ☆ 3tsu!!); 34. "The Rabbitfolk Homeland ☆ Three Stars!!" (兎人族の里で☆3つ!!, Usaginin Zoku no Sato de ☆ 3tsu!!); EX. "Ogre Banishing ☆ Three...Stars...?" (鬼は外で☆3つ...？, Oni wa soto de ☆ 3tsu...?)
Rimuru orders Framea to visit Luminous to share about photography, with Hinata becoming a fashion model. A huge picture of Hinata's modeling is hung for public viewing in Tempest along with other images of Rimuru's executives. Rimuru and Vesta then invent a video recorder. Rimuru then instructs Framea to create a promotional video about Tempest, with Milim and Frey later joining to help. Sometime later, Rimuru learns about the reports of a mysterious monster lurking in Jura Forest's Lake Sis. He then joins Gabil and his other executives to hunt the monster. With Framea acting as bait, Gabil kills the shark-like monster. After the incident, Rimuru gives a tour to Blumund's Guild Master Fuze around the zoo located on the dungeon's 95th floor. Sometime later, the elder of the Rabbitfolk tribe orders Framea's father to bring his daughter back. Upon reaching Tempest, Framea's father convinces her to return home, but he is introduced to Rimuru by her since she is working under him. Rimuru then advises Framea that it is good to return home. An extra chapter depicts Rimuru doing mamemaki, causing a misunderstanding among Benimaru, Shuna, Shion, and Souei since their race, Ogre, is associated with oni. Milim then joins in "warding off" them.
| 7 | June 30, 2020 | 978-4-86716-025-1 | May 3, 2022 | 978-1-9753-4243-2 |
35. "The Rabbitfolk Homeland ☆ Three Stars!! (Part 2)" (兎人族の里で☆3つ!! 2☆目！, Usaginin Zoku no Sato de ☆ 3tsu!! 2 ☆ Moku!); 36. "The Rabbitfolk Homeland ☆ Three Stars!! (Part 3)" (兎人族の里で☆3つ!! 3☆目！, Usaginin Zoku no Sato de ☆ 3tsu!! 3 ☆ Moku!); 37. "The Rabbitfolk Homeland ☆ Three Stars!! (Part 4)" (兎人族の里で☆3つ!! 4☆目！, Usaginin Zoku no Sato de ☆ 3tsu!! 4 ☆ Moku!); 38. "The Rabbitfolk Homeland ☆ Three Stars!! (Part 5)" (兎人族の里で☆3つ!! 5☆目！, Usaginin Zoku no Sato de ☆ 3tsu!! 5 ☆ Moku!); 39. "Ball-Game Competition ☆ Three Stars!!" (球技大会で☆3つ!!, Kyūgi Taikai de ☆ 3tsu!!); 40. "Crime Prevention ☆ Three Stars!!" (犯罪防止で☆3つ!!, Hanzai Bōshi de ☆ 3tsu!!)
Rimuru decides to accompany Framea and her father back to the Rabbitfolk village near Lake Sis. With Ranga and Gobta tagging along, they go on an adventure until they reach the village. Some Rabbitfolk see Rimuru as Gobta's servant, so they treated Gobta lavishly while Rimuru is locked in storage. Meanwhile, Framea refuses the Rabbitfolk elder's offer to become the next head of the village until she is threatened by other Rabbitfolks that something bad will happen to Rimuru, causing a deal of worry for Framea and her father since their kin are not aware of Rimuru being the demon lord. Rimuru shows up and is about to be taken hostage when Veldora shows up due to his jealousy of not being invited on the journey. In the end, the misunderstanding about Rimuru has been cleared and the Rabbitfolk tribe promises cooperation with Tempest. Sometime later, a dodgeball tournament is held in the Coliseum refereed by Diablo, with Hinata and Luminous watching it. Veldora's team is out due to Ramiris not able to lift the ball, while Milim's team fails to listen to the rule. A heated final match between Shuna and Shion's teams takes place until Framea reveals to Hinata that the cause of the tournament, unbeknownst to Shuna and Shion, is due to their fan clubs' debate on what is the better breast size. Sometime later, a visitor steals an apple but is later caught by Ultima and Carrera, who are respectively working as the Tempest's chief prosecutor of the Public Prosecution Office and chief justice officer of the Supreme Court. The two Primordials got into a debate on the process of handling a criminal during his apprehension.
| 8 | January 30, 2021 | 978-4-86716-104-3 | July 19, 2022 | 978-1-9753-4245-6 |
41. "Vacation Trip ☆ Three Stars!!" (休暇旅行で☆3つ!!, Kyūka Ryokō de ☆ 3tsu!!); 42. "Hideaway Lounge ☆ Three Stars!!" (隠れ家ラウンジで☆3つ!!, Kakurega Raunji de ☆ 3tsu!!); 43. "Seeking Refuge in the City ☆ Three Stars!!" (街に避難で☆3つ!!, Machi ni Hinan de ☆ 3tsu!!); 44. "Requital ☆ Three Stars!!" (恩返しで☆3つ!!, Ongaeshi de ☆ 3tsu!!); 45. "Chasing the Big Game ☆ Three Stars!!" (大物を追って☆3つ!!, Ōmono o Tsuitte ☆ 3tsu!!); 46. "Mochi Delivery ☆ Three Stars!!" (おモチを届けて☆3つ!!, O-mochi o Todokete ☆ 3tsu!!); EX. "Wonderful Memories ☆ Three Stars!!" (楽しい思い出に☆3つ!!, Tanoshii Omoide ni ☆ 3tsu!!)
Rimuru orders Ultima, Carrera, and Testarossa to take a day off and hires Framea as their guide. The three Primordial girls deduce that Framea was ordered to monitor them on behalf of Rimuru, so they do various ways to make her impressed. In the end, the Primordial girls have caused trouble to Framea and other customers during their stay in an inn, resulting in Rimuru instructing Diablo to "retrain" them. As compensation, Rimuru brings Framea to Jura Lounge and Bar, where she befriends the Hero Masayuki Honjō. Sometime later, Framea learns from Rimuru of the war between Tempest and the Eastern Empire. People living across the Jura Forest have been evacuated to the capital city, including the Rabbitfolk tribe. Framea encounters a lost Rabbitfolk girl and brings her to Yoshida's store, where she finds her father and the tribe's elder eating. Framea offers them to be their guide around the city to make them comfortable despite the war. She later learns from the three Primordial girls that the war has ended early in favor of Tempest. Sometime later, Hinata visits Rimuru and gives a hint about wanting to eat sushi. Rimuru then orders Framea to catch a spear toro monster from the ocean, with Gobta, Kaijin, and Dragon Faithful head priest Middray tagging along. Afterward, Framea is ordered by Rimuru to deliver mochi. She is later taken captive during the delivery. An extra chapter depicts Framea reminiscing the memories of her stay in Tempest when she notices her hat from her head missing, only to find it being stolen by Ramiris.

=== The Slime Diaries: That Time I Got Reincarnated as a Slime ===
| No. | Original release date | Original ISBN | English release date | English ISBN |
|---|---|---|---|---|
| 1 | September 28, 2018 | 978-4-06-512744-5 | July 30, 2019 | 978-1-64212-968-7 |
| 2 | March 29, 2019 | 978-4-06-514857-0 | September 10, 2019 | 978-1-64659-017-9 |
| 3 | November 8, 2019 | 978-4-06-517464-7 | June 16, 2020 | 978-1-64659-394-1 |
| 4 | July 9, 2020 | 978-4-06-519725-7 | November 24, 2020 | 978-1-64659-821-2 |
| 5 | March 31, 2021 | 978-4-06-522559-2 | July 27, 2021 | 978-1-63699-245-7 |
| 6 | July 7, 2022 | 978-4-06-528314-1 | February 28, 2023 | 978-1-68491-608-5 |
| 7 | January 9, 2024 | 978-4-06-534119-3 | June 25, 2024 | 979-8-88933-579-5 |

=== That Time I Got Reincarnated as a Slime: Trinity in Tempest ===
| No. | Original release date | Original ISBN | English release date | English ISBN |
|---|---|---|---|---|
| 1 | April 12, 2019 | 978-4-06-516906-3 | November 30, 2020 | 978-1-64651-176-1 |
1. "Here I Am, Tempest!!" (来たです、魔国連邦!!, Kitadesu, Makoku Renpō!!); 2. "Let's Do It! Working on the Security Patrol" (やるです！警備隊のお仕事, Yarudesu! Keibitai no Oshigoto); 3. "A Sudden Visitor! A New Rival Appears?!" (突然の来訪者！強敵登場!?, Totsuzen no Raihō-sha! Kyōteki Tōjō?!); 4. "Ready for Lessons! The Way of Cooking!!" (たのもう！料理への道!!, Tanomou! Ryōri e no Michi!!); 5. "I Give Up! A Bold New Intruder!" (お手上げです、大胆不敵の侵入者！, Oteagedesu, Daitanfuteki no Shin'nyū-sha!); 6. "Eat This! A Stunning New Dish" (いただくです！心揺さぶる初料理, Itadakudesu! Kokoro yusaburu Hatsu Ryōri)
Carrion, a Demon Lord and the king of Beast Kingdom Eurazania, orders a fox lycanthrope named Phos to secretly investigate Jura Tempest Federation. She begins to work on the highway development project but later joins the Tempest's security patrol upon Gobta's recommendation. Phos meets Rimuru Tempest, who is about to leave for the Armed Nation of Dwargon, after helping a young goblin girl present a charm to him. She then encounters Stella, a member of Dragon Faithful that worships Demon Lord Milim Nava, and Nemu, a harpy from Harpy Kingdom Fulbrosia who is sent by Demon Lord Frey to investigate Tempest, and treats them with food. After tasting Tempest's food, Stella becomes interested in learning how to cook for Milim and asks chef Gobuichi for help. She later encounters Rimuru, who recently returned from Dwargon, and experiences a taste of his cooking. Nemu begins working in Shuna's shop after falling in love with the Tempest textile's quality since she dreams of creating her ultimate bed. Phos, Stella, and Nemu are enjoying the hot spring bath when Shion overhears Stella bragging about tasting Rimuru's cooking. Stella agrees to recreate Rimuru's cooking style by cooking his fried potatoes for them. As a courtesy, Shion cooks a meal, but only Phos and Stella are the ones who eat her food after Shuna, Gobuichi, and Nemu left the kitchen immediately.
| 2 | March 27, 2020 | 978-4-06-518757-9 | February 2, 2021 | 978-1-64651-182-2 |
7. "I Won't Give Up! Trials and Travails of Private Training" (負けないです！七転八倒特別指導, Makenaidesu! Shichitenbattō Tokubetsu Shidō); 8. "A Nice Place to Sleep" (気持ちの良い寝床, Kimochi no ii Nedoko); 9. "Time to Learn! Soul of the Merchant" (学ぶです！商人魂, Manabudesu! Shōnin Tamashī); 10. "Show Off! The Pride of a Warrior Is in a Single Strike" (見せるです！一打入魂、戦士の意地, Miserudesu! Ichida Nyūkon, Senshi no Iji); 11. "After Him! A Heartfelt Chase Sequence" (追うです！繋がる心の逮捕劇, Oudesu! Tsunagaru Kokoro no Taiho Geki); 12. "Prelude to Disaster: Part One" (災禍の幕開け【前編】, Saika no Makuake: Zenpen)
Phos is referred by Gobuemon, who is responsible for her in the Tempest's security patrol, to Hakuro for training. She also finds Stella, who arrives to deliver refreshments, having a battle with him. They are unable to defeat him but still are optimistic to learn his fighting spirit technique. Nemu meets Gabil while taking a break from delivering Shuna's order. Sometime later, Phos, Stella, and Nemu attend a seminar to learn about the currency used by humans and trading with them. They then take a practical test by selling high and low potions. The first couple of transactions go smoothly until a merchant attempts to scam them, but another merchant, Gard Mjöllmile, exposes him and saves the trio. Phos, Stella, and Nemu witness Mjurran assisting Gobta, Yohm, and Grucius in their training with Hakuro. They also get a chance to fight her, only for them to get defeated. Mjurran's words cause Phos to become worried as she remembers that her friends Stella and Nemu are serving different demon lords, and they might become her enemies in the future. Her worries dissipate after the trio worked together to capture a non-paying customer. Gobta delivers the news of Rimuru's upcoming return from the Kingdom of Ingrassia and orders Phos and everyone in his command to not cause harm to the armed humans that are approaching Tempest. Phos then learns from Grucius about Milim's declaration of war on Carrion. She also learns from a goblin woman that her children are in the forest so she and Stella offer help to look for them. Nemu joins in finding them since she recently played with them. Meanwhile, scouts from the Kingdom of Falmuth find the children playing and prepare to kill them.
| 3 | July 9, 2020 | 978-4-06-520044-5 | March 16, 2021 | 978-1-64651-195-2 |
13. "Prelude to Disaster (Part Two)" (災禍の幕開け【後編】, Saika no Makuake: Kōhen); 14. "Blood in the Streets" (流血の町, Ryūketsu no Machi); 15. "Trinity" (トリニティ, Toriniti); 16. "Claw Marks of Disaster" (災禍の爪痕, Saika no Tsume Ato)
Phos, Stella, and Nemu rescue the children from the Falmuth soldiers' attack and later find Tempest surrounded by a barrier upon returning. They suddenly feel weakened and, at the same time, encounter the same soldiers again. They still manage to deal blows against them until a mercenary named Zachariah knocks down Stella and the soldiers have pinned down Phos and Nemu. He and the soldiers begin to murder the goblin residents in front of Phos and Nemu. Phos transforms into her beast form and begins to kill the soldiers. She and Nemu are joined by Stella in defeating Zachariah until Gobuemon arrives and finishes him off. Phos, Stella, and Nemu bring the dead goblins to the city plaza, where they find Shion among the casualties. While taking a break, the trio learns of Rimuru's return.
| 4 | March 31, 2021 | 978-4-06-522504-2 | November 23, 2021 | 978-1-64651-196-9 |
17. "Monsters and Humans" (魔物と人間と, Mamono to Ningen to); 18. "Nonnegotiable" (譲れないもの, Yuzurenai mono); 19. "Different Paths" (それぞれの道, Sorezore no Michi); 20. "The Day of the Miracle" (奇跡の日, Kiseki no Hi)
While at the plaza, Phos, Stella, and Nemu learn of Mjurran's involvement in conjuring the barrier. The trio then helps in distributing food rations among the residents. They encounter Mjöllmile and are informed by him of Falmuth's reason for attacking Tempest. As they are about to take a break, the trio witnesses Rimuru returning to the plaza and learning of Shion's death. Three days since Rimuru ordered everyone to leave him alone in the plaza, Phos, Stella, and Nemu visit Mjurran during her house arrest. They learn that she serves Demon Lord Clayman, with Stella shockingly learning from her about Milim's declaration of war on Carrion. They deduce that Clayman is the cause of recent events. Stella attempts to leave the town but is unable to due to the barrier. The trio then sees the arrival of Kabal, Gido, and Elen and a new barrier being erected. They join the residents in front of the town hall, where they listen to Rimuru's plan of becoming a demon lord and resurrecting the dead. Phos, Stella, and Nemu join the perimeter security as they wait for the barrier to get destroyed. Afterward, Stella and Nemu return to their respective demon lords to check on their conditions. Left alone, Phos encounters Zachariah's partner and engages in a fight with him until Gobuemon arrives to assist her. She later finds the two unconscious and unknowingly meets Luminous Valentine, who happens to visit Tempest to take a quick look at what is happening in the country. Luminous immediately leaves and tells Phos to keep their meeting secret. Phos and Gobuemon return to the plaza and witness Rimuru in his slime form beginning to evolve into a demon lord. Phos joins Gobuemon in patrolling the area and suddenly finds the residents around her losing consciousness. She returns to the plaza and finds the dead residents resurrected.
| 5 | July 8, 2021 | 978-4-06-523796-0 | December 28, 2021 | 978-1-64651-221-8 |
21. "A New Signpost" (新たなる道標, Aratanaru Dōhyō); 22. "Roaring with Pride" (誇りの咆哮, Hokori no Hōkō); 23. "Sharpened Fangs and Claws" (研ぎ澄まされる爪牙, Togisumasa reru Sōga); 24. "The Night Before the Battle" (出陣前夜, Shutsujin Zen'ya)
After hearing the first account of the victim's resurrection and about Yohm becoming the king of Falmuth, Phos is expecting the arrival of refugees from Eurazania next. While waiting for them, she is greeted by Albis and later learns of Rimuru's waking from sleep. Later, a refugee causes a commotion but is immediately handled by Phos, with Grucius, Albis, and Suphia warning the refugees to not pick a fight with Tempest residents. Inviting the refugees, Tempest celebrates Rimuru's evolution as a demon lord. Phos later sees Phobio arriving, who was left behind to watch the battle between Carrion and Milim. She attempts to approach the Three Beastketeers who are about to meet with Rimuru to learn of Carrion's status when she is stopped by Diablo. Joining the refugees the following day, Phos learns about the destruction of Eurazania and the defeat of Carrion at the hands of Frey. The Three Beastketeers reassure them that Carrion is alive and is only taken toward Clayman's dominion. With Tempest as their ally in defeating Clayman, the refugees begin to prepare for the battle when they sense the revival of Veldora in the sealed cave. They are informed of Rimuru's safety inside and are advised to not disturb him. The Three Beastketeers then train the refugees. During the training, Phos receives advice from Diablo about how hard work can bear success. Three days after Veldora's revival, a new wave of refugees arrives at Tempest. Suphia becomes uneasy about Rimuru's status in the cave so she decides to visit it along with Phos and other refugees, but they are prevented by Diablo and calmed down by Benimaru. Afterward, Rimuru emerges from the cave and introduces Veldora to everyone. Rimuru gathers his executives and the Three Beastketeers for a meeting, with the other leaders of allied nations joining. While guarding the meeting area, Phos encounters Demon Lord Ramiris heading toward the meeting. Grucius later shares with Phos what transpired during the meeting. As the battle begins tomorrow, Phos becomes part of the fighting force and receives new weapons from Kaijin and Kurobe.
| 6 | March 9, 2022 | 978-4-06-527029-5 | October 18, 2022 | 978-1-64651-222-5 |
25. "City of the Forgotten Dragon" (忘れられた竜の都, Wasurerareta Ryū no Miyako); 26. "Harpy Kingdom Fulbrosia" (天翼国フルブロジア, Tenyoku Koku Furuburojia); 27. "Veteran Soldiers of the Camp" (野営地の古参兵, Yaei-chi no Kosan-hei); 28. "Reunion at the Battlefield" (戦場の再会, Senjō no Saikai)
Stella arrives at the City of the Forgotten Dragon, Milim's domain, and finds Clayman's soldiers inhabiting the place as well. She convinces Middray, the head priest of Dragon Faithful, in joining the battle by winning a match against a fellow Dragon Faithful member. Meanwhile, Nemu reaches Fulbrosia and finds Frey along with Carrion. She learns that Millim and Frey already knew about Clayman's scheme so they pretend to work with him, leading to a war with Eurazania. At a camp in Eurazania, Stella brings food to a supply unit who are not in favor of the upcoming war. She learns that they are followers of former demon lord Kazalim and supported Clayman's ascension in place of him. Sensing chivalry among them, Stella sides with the supply unit as the war begins. On a battlefield, Phos finds the supply unit and is about to attack them but is stopped by Stella. The two engage in a heated battle until Nemu arrives and stops them. As Nemu tells Phos that Carrion is safe, they notice two Charybdis emerging from the area. Benimaru destroys them, and Albis declares victory on Tempest and Eurazania's side, prompting the remaining Clayman's soldiers to surrender. Benimaru, Albis, and Middray learn from Phos about Carrion's safety and his attendance at the Walpurgis along with Frey and other demon lords.
| 7 | December 8, 2022 | 978-4-06-529930-2 | June 20, 2023 | 978-1-64651-299-7 |
29. "The Gathering" (集う者達, Tsudou Mono Tachi); 30. "Exciting New Duty" (胸高鳴る新たな務め, Mune Takanaru Aratana Tsutome); 31. "The Departure!" (出発！, Shuppatsu!); 32. "Our First Human Country" (初めての人間の国, Hajimete no Ningen no Kuni)
The battle against the Demon Lord Clayman has come to an end. The leaders of Tempest, Eurazania, and the City of the Forgotten Dragon are busy dealing with the aftermath when they receive troubling news from Claire of Fulbrosia. Frey and Carrion have both formed an alliance with Millim Nava. With the trinity and their respective homelands united, the three warrioresses must adapt to the world that is changing around them whilst under the veils of this new threat.
| 8 | September 8, 2023 | 978-4-06-532855-2 | May 7, 2024 | 978-1-64651-300-0 |
| 9 | January 9, 2024 | 978-4-06-534107-0 | December 24, 2024 | 978-1-64651-437-3 |
| 10 | June 7, 2024 | 978-4-06-535707-1 | April 21, 2026 | 979-8-88877-458-8 |
| 11 | January 30, 2025 | 978-4-06-538002-4 | August 4, 2026 | 979-8-88877-510-3 |
| 12 | June 9, 2025 | 978-4-06-539657-5 | October 20, 2026 | 979-8-88877-721-3 |
| 13 | February 9, 2026 | 978-4-06-541337-1 | — | — |
| 14 | August 7, 2026 | 978-4-06-544452-8 | — | — |

=== That Time I Got Reincarnated (Again!) as a Workaholic Slime ===
| No. | Original release date | Original ISBN | English release date | English ISBN |
|---|---|---|---|---|
| 1 | July 9, 2019 | 978-4-06-516294-1 | September 1, 2020 | 978-1-64659-554-9 |
| 2 | March 27, 2020 | 978-4-06-518831-6 | October 6, 2020 | 978-1-64659-661-4 |

=== That Time I Got Reincarnated as a Slime: Clayman's Revenge ===
| No. | Original release date | Original ISBN | English release date | English ISBN |
|---|---|---|---|---|
| 1 | November 9, 2022 | 978-4-06-530095-4 | — | — |
| 2 | May 9, 2023 | 978-4-06-531662-7 | — | — |
| 3 | October 6, 2023 | 978-4-06-533288-7 | — | — |
| 4 | March 8, 2024 | 978-4-06-534892-5 | — | — |
| 5 | September 9, 2024 | 978-4-06-536809-1 | — | — |
| 6 | January 30, 2025 | 978-4-06-538035-2 | — | — |
| 7 | August 7, 2025 | 978-4-06-539691-9 | — | — |
| 8 | February 9, 2026 | 978-4-06-541338-8 | — | — |
| 9 | August 7, 2026 | 978-4-06-544444-3 | — | — |

=== That Time I Got Reincarnated as a Slime: Gourmet Legend: Peko and Rimuru's Cooking Notebook ===
| No. | Original release date | Original ISBN | English release date | English ISBN |
|---|---|---|---|---|
| 1 | January 9, 2024 | 978-4-06-534155-1 | — | — |
| 2 | June 7, 2024 | 978-4-06-535685-2 | — | — |
| 3 | September 9, 2024 | 978-4-06-536656-1 | — | — |
| 4 | June 9, 2025 | 978-4-06-539686-5 | — | — |
| 5 | October 9, 2025 | 978-4-06-539686-5 | — | — |
| 6 | February 9, 2026 | 978-4-06-542383-7 | — | — |
| 7 | October 8, 2026 | 978-4-06-545122-9 | — | — |

=== Toaru Kyūka no Sigoshi-kata ===
| No. | Original release date | Original ISBN | English release date | English ISBN |
|---|---|---|---|---|
| 1 | January 9, 2024 | 978-4-06-534106-3 | — | — |
| 2 | September 9, 2024 | 978-4-06-536003-3 | — | — |
| 3 | June 9, 2025 | 978-4-06-539689-6 | — | — |

== See also ==
- List of That Time I Got Reincarnated as a Slime characters
- List of That Time I Got Reincarnated as a Slime episodes
