= Megiddo, Israel =

Kibbutz in northern Israel

Megiddo: מגידו, מְגִדּוֹ (Hebrew)
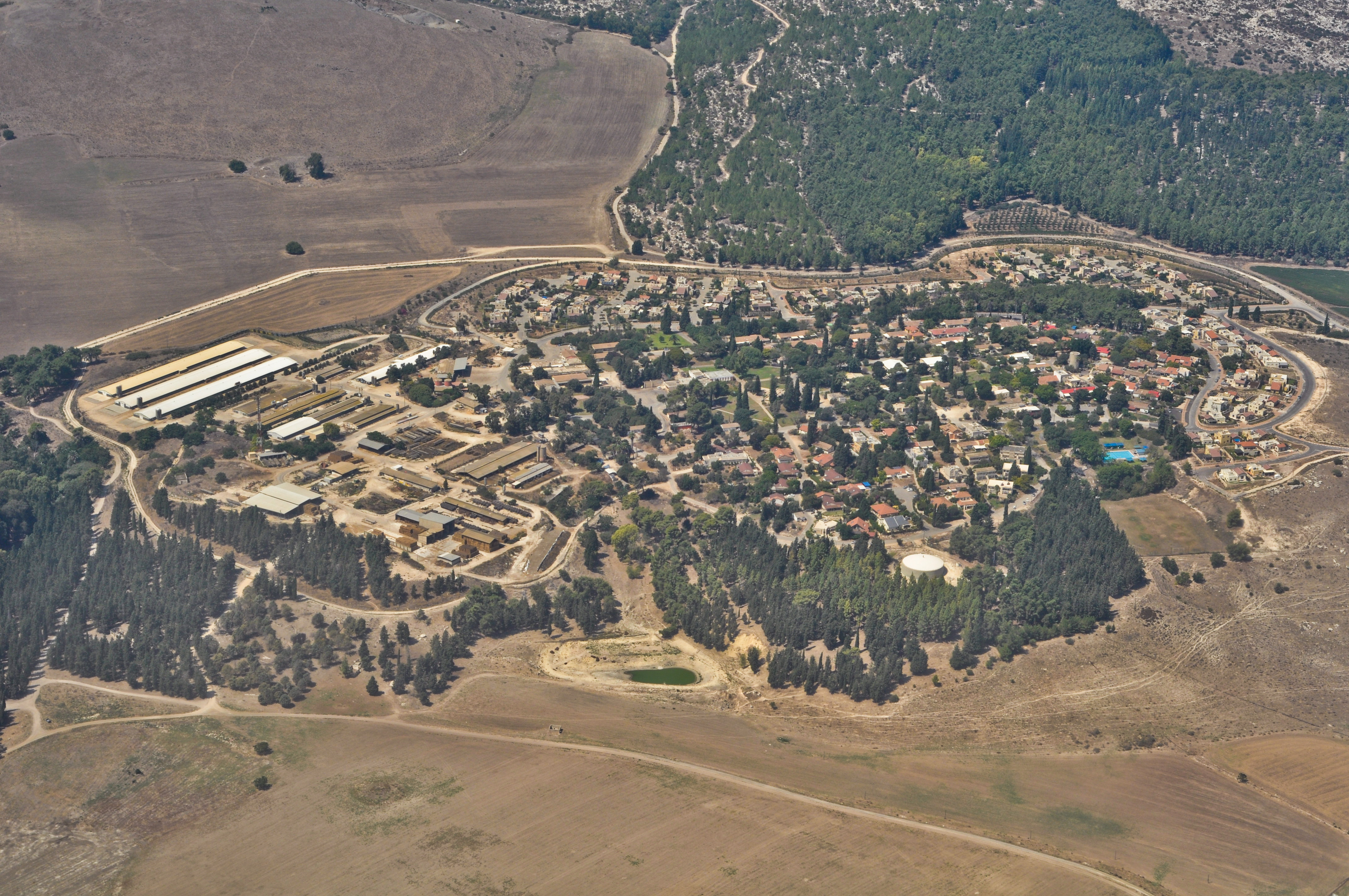
- An aerial view of Megiddo from the east.

- Location within Jezreel Valley region of Israel Location within Israel
- Coordinates: 32°34′44″N 35°10′50″E
- Country: Israel
- District: Northern
- Subdistrict: Jezreel
- Council: Megiddo
- Affiliation: Kibbutz Movement
- Founded: 7000 BCE (Tel Megiddo); 1150 BCE (Israelite city); 1949 (Israeli kibbutz)
- Founder: Holocaust survivors
- Population (2024): 969
- Website: www.megido.org.il

Megiddo (Hebrew: מְגִדּוֹ، Arabic: مجیدو) is a kibbutz in northern Israel, built in 1949. Located in the Jezreel Valley, it falls under the jurisdiction of Megiddo Regional Council. In 2024, it had a population of 969.

The kibbutz is located near Megiddo Junction, the intersection of highways 65, from Hadera to Afula, and 66, running from Haifa south to the West Bank. The junction is the site of a bus terminal and a high-security prison. The kibbutz was built 600 metres north-east of the site of the depopulated Arab village of Lajjun, now known as Einot Kobi.

In Christian apocalyptic literature, Mount Megiddo, the hill overlooking the valley where the current kibbutz is located, is identified as the site of the final battle between the forces of good and evil at the end of time, known as Armageddon and mentioned in the New Testament in Revelation 16:16.

== Geography ==
The kibbutz is located near the site of the several Battles of Megiddo and Tel Megiddo, a rich archaeological site. According to the Bible, the town was apportioned to the tribe of Manasseh (1 Chronicles 7:29). In 2005, Israeli archaeologists discovered the remains of an ancient church, perhaps the oldest in the Holy Land, under the grounds of the prison. Authorities are speculating about moving the prison so the site can be accessible to tourists.

== History ==
=== Antiquity ===
Tel Megiddo is considered one of the most ancient settlements in the Middle East. It guarded the western branch of a narrow pass and trade route connecting Ancient Egypt and Assyria. The site was inhabited from approximately 7000 BCE to 586 BCE. The first significant remains date to the Chalcolithic period (4500–3500 BCE). The town experienced a decline in the Early Bronze-Age IV period (2300–2000 BCE),

The city was somewhat revived around 2000 BCE. Following massive construction, the town reached its largest size in the Middle Bronze Age, at 10–12 hectares. Though the city was subjugated by Thutmose III, it still prospered, and a massive and highly elaborate palace was constructed in the Late Bronze Age.

=== Iron Age (biblical era) ===
The city was destroyed around 1150 BCE. The area was resettled by what some scholars have identified as early Israelites, before being replaced with an unwalled Philistine town. When the Israelites captured it, it became an important city. It was destroyed, possibly by Aramaean raiders, and rebuilt, this time as an administrative center for Tiglath-Pileser III's occupation of Samaria.

Its importance soon dwindled, and it was abandoned around 586 BCE. Since that time, Megiddo has remained uninhabited. Surviving ruins pre-dating 586 BCE have had no new settlements to disturb the ruins. Since then, the town of Lajjun, not to be confused with the el-Lajjun archaeological site in Jordan, was built near the site, but without any new habitation or disturbance of the tell itself.

=== Ottoman period ===
During the Ottoman Period, Lajjun was the capital of Turabay Emirate (1517-1683), which encompassed the Jezreel Valley, Mount Carmel, Beit She'an Valley, northern Samaria, Ramot Menashe, the northern part of the Sharon plain. It was the center of an eponymous Sanjak (district) and one of Palestine' provincial Capitals during the 16th century. Around 1600, the seat of the Turabays moved to Jenin.

=== First World War ===
The Battle of Megiddo was fought during World War I. Allied troops, led by General Edmund Allenby fought a defending Ottoman army near the site of the ancient ruin.

=== State of Israel ===
The kibbutz was founded on 2 February 1949 by a gar'in of Holocaust survivors from Hungary and Poland who organized at the end of World War II and fought in the 1948 Arab–Israeli war. At first the members settled on the ruins of the Arab village al-Lajjun. Several years later, they relocated to a nearby hill. In 1952 a gar'in of migrants from Lebanon and Mexico joined the kibbutz. In 1959, another gar'in of migrants from Argentina arrived. In the next few years more gar'ins joined and youth organizations volunteered in the kibbutz, but the population did not grow as members left the kibbutz.

The kibbutz is featured in a popular Israeli children's story about a puppy named Pluto from Kibbutz Megiddo.

The kibbutz had problems developing demographically and economically. The number of residents remained low, with a high turnover of residents until the late 1990s. In November 2000, due to demographic problems and economic instability, members of the kibbutz decided to change the communal lifestyle and structure of the kibbutz in a way that every member is now responsible for his or her own livelihood and the kibbutz provides only some welfare services. Also, the members of the kibbutz decided to transfer the ownership of the housing units and businesses from the kibbutz to the residents.

In 2007, two new neighbourhoods were built on the western and northern parts of the kibbutz, with 108 housing units.

== Twin towns – sister cities ==
Megiddo is twinned with:

- Ixelles, Belgium (suspended since 2 July 2024 as it ‘could be interpreted as an endorsement of the policy currently pursued by the State of Israel’)
- Hita, Japan

== See also ==
- Legio
