= Golani Interchange =

Highway interchange in Israel

Golani Junction
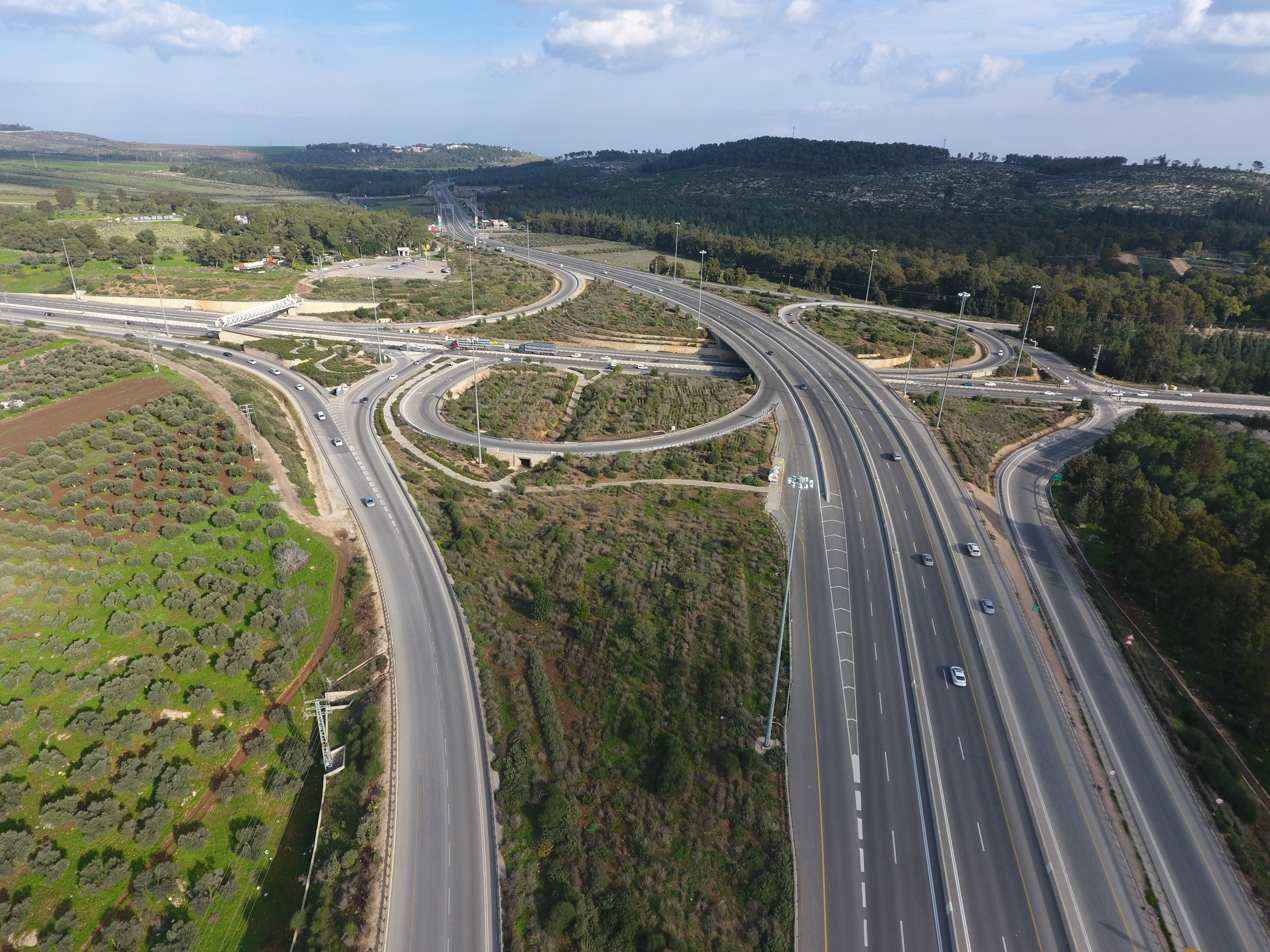
- Golani Interchange, January 2019
- Interactive map of Golani Junction

Location
- Lower Galilee
- Coordinates: 32°46′29.6″N 35°24′28.4″E
- Roads at junction: Highway 65; Highway 77

Construction
- Type: Interchange
- Opened: August 2013

Golani Interchange (Hebrew: מחלף גולני), known as Maskana Junction in Arabic, is a key road interchange in the Lower Galilee region of northern Israel, located east of Haifa and west of Tiberias, at the intersection of highways 65 and 77. The Golani Brigade Museum commemorating the Golani Brigade is situated there.

== History ==
The previous at-grade intersection at Golani Junction experienced frequent traffic congestion on weekends and holidays when many Israelis travelled to the north of the country on vacation. Construction began in 2012 on an interchange to replace the former junction at a cost of NIS 300 million. The interchange opened for traffic in August 2013.

== Gallery ==
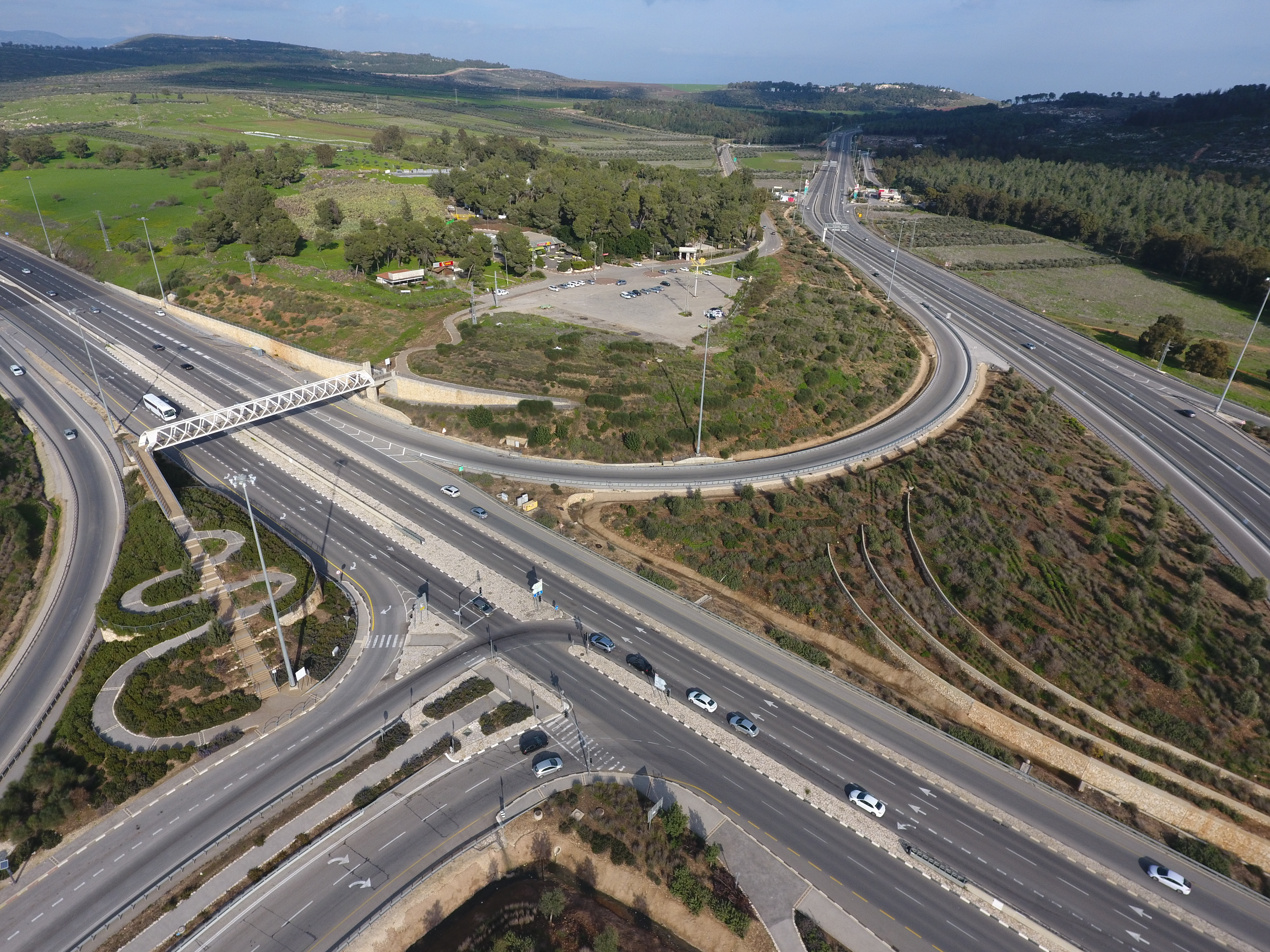
Golani interchange and the memorial site of the Golani brigade, January 2019

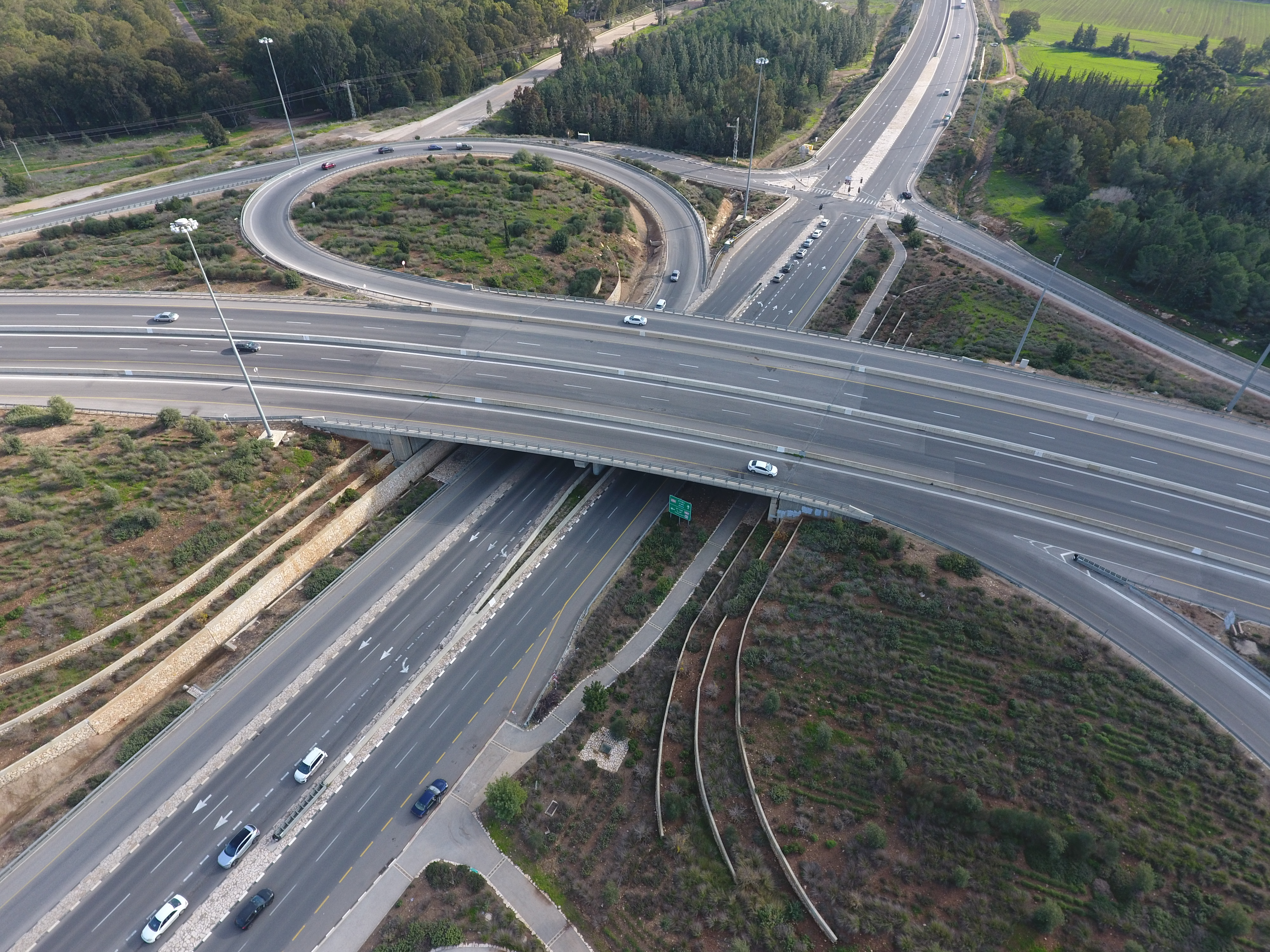
Golani interchange, January 2019

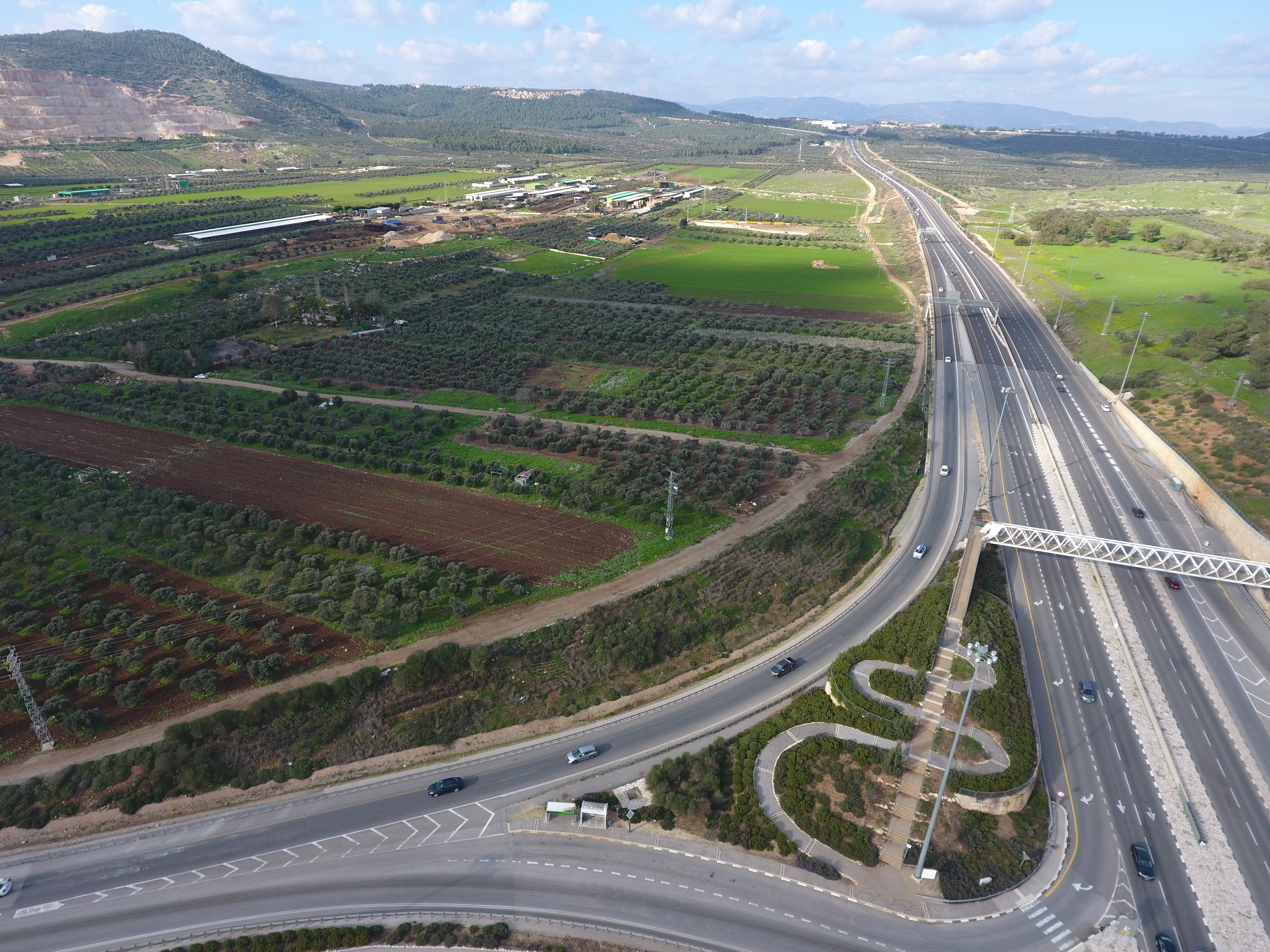
Golani interchange heading north, January 2019

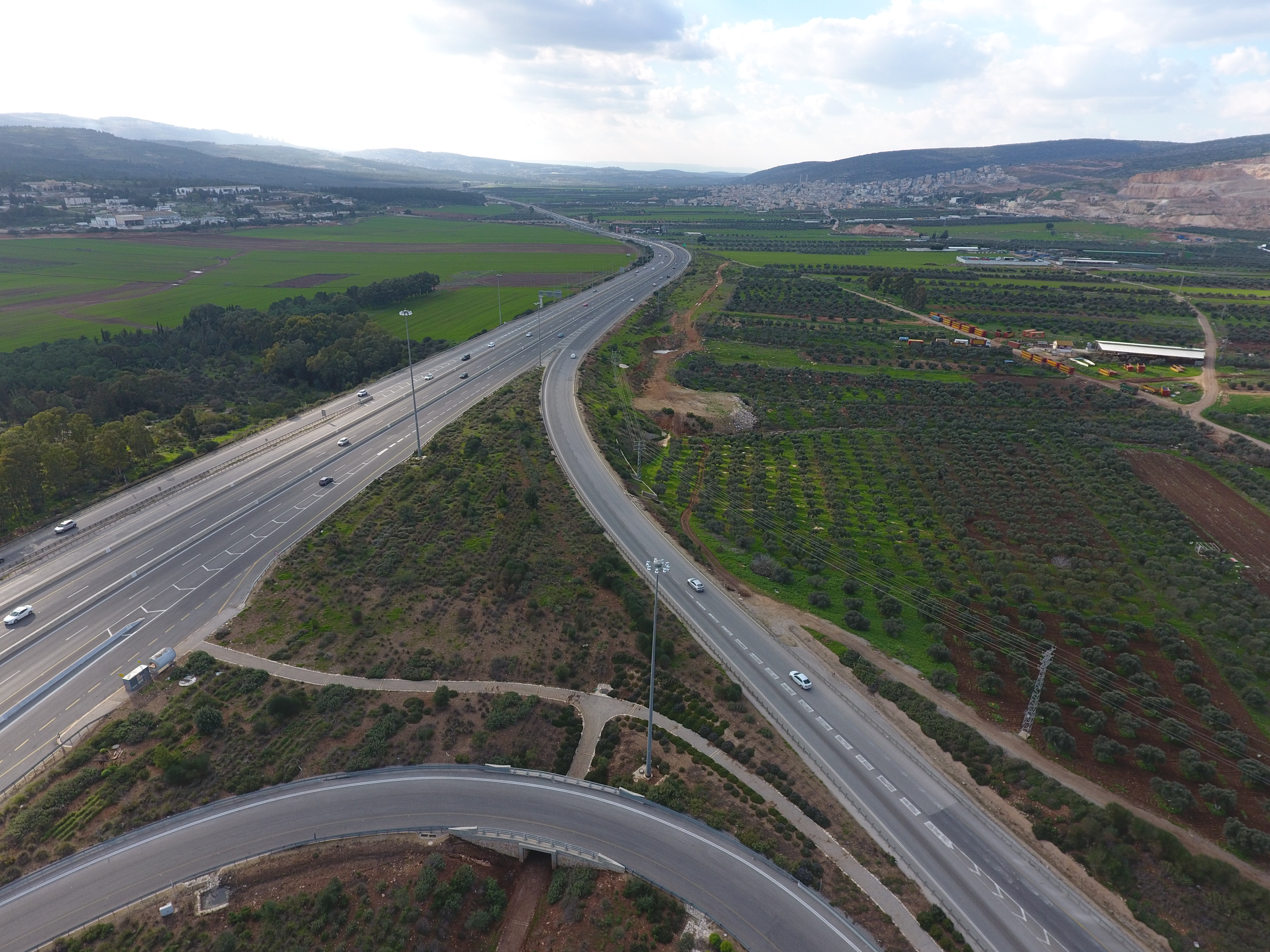
Golani interchange heading west, January 2019

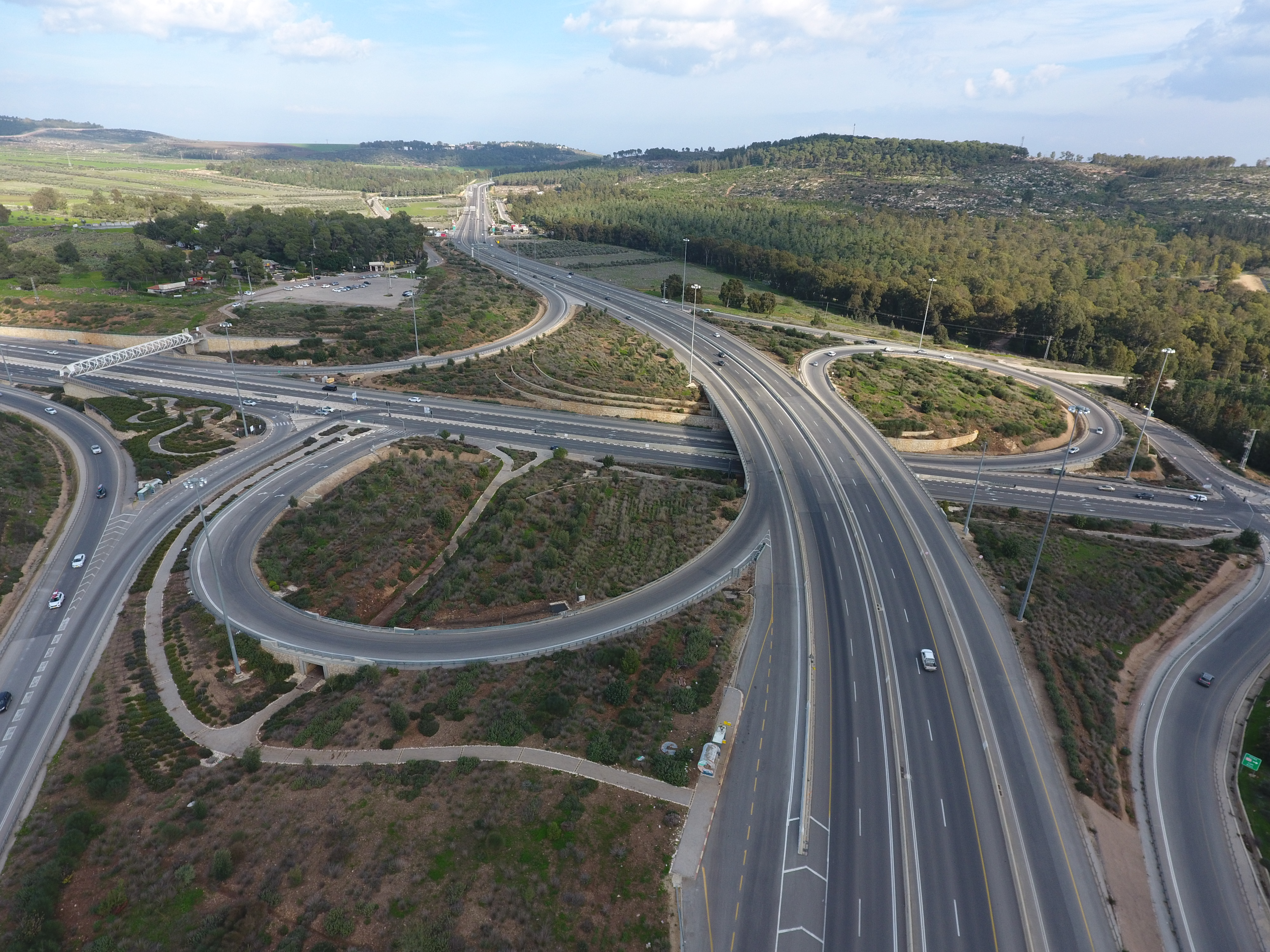
Golani interchange, January 2019

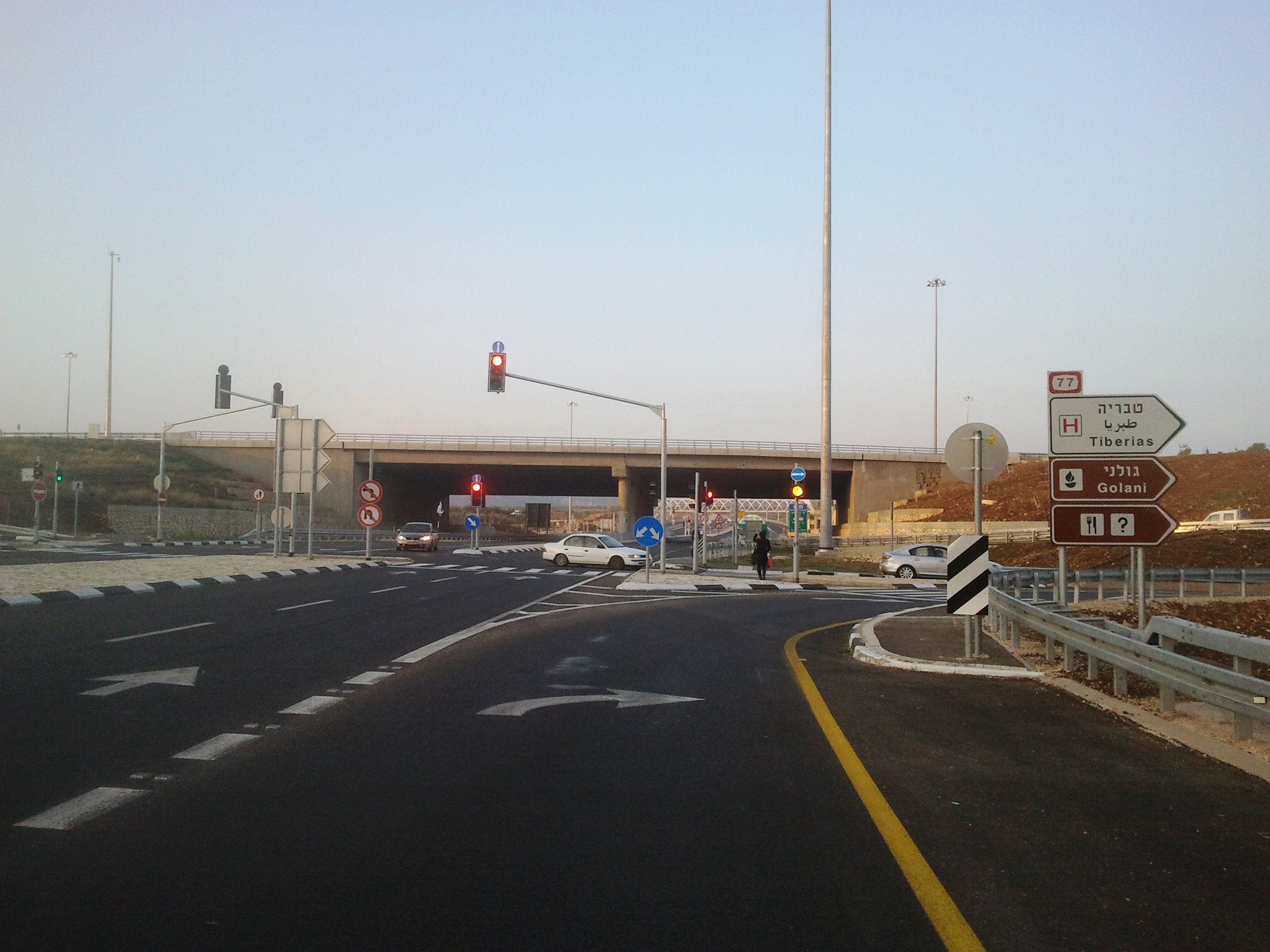
Golani Interchange, view from north Route 65

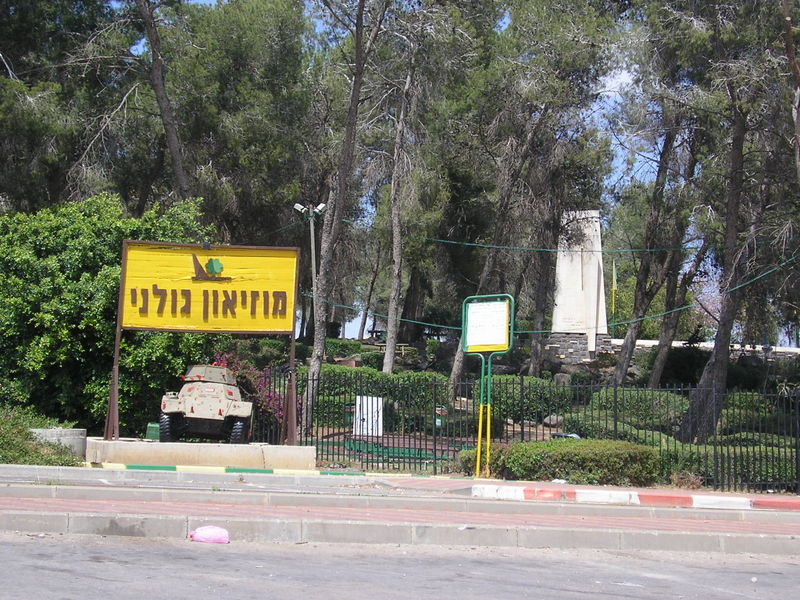
Memorial and Golani Museum, Golani Interchange
