= Golani Family =

Royal family in Sindh, Pakistan

The Golani family was a royal family in Sindh, a province of Pakistan, dating from the 19th century.

After the invasion of Sindh by Charles Napier in 1843, the region was divided into many provinces, and each of these provinces was assigned to Zamindars to collect taxes for the British East India Company. These Zamindars were also known as 'Wadaras'. The Wadara of Shikarpur was Lord Wadra Golani (1861–1931), a merchant born into the royal family of Golani. In 1918, his eldest son Shobraj Golani (1885–1978) took over as the Landlord of Shikarpur, Digri, Jamrao, Kachhelo, Tando Jan Mohammed, Ratnabad, Roshanabad and Khayrpur. Shobraj Bhagwandas Golani was also invited to Great Britain by the King, along with all the Nawabs and Maharajahs of India, to discuss the participation of their respective provinces in the expansion of the British Empire in the Middle East. Sindh was later made part of Bombay Presidency and became a separate province in 1935. Shobraj, along with his eldest son Shri Hashmatrai S Golani (1918–1979), moved to Bombay in 1947 after the Partition of India.

The family tree begins with Golumal, from whom the surname Golani originated. Jawaharlal was the elder son of Golumal, and Lekhraj was the elder son of Jawaharmal. The famous Seth Kushaldas Lekhraj Golani was the son of Lekhraj. Seth Kushal Das had five sons: Pribhdas, Gurnomal, Vishindas, Sobhraj, and Tejumal. The picture below shows the division of Seth Kushal'das's property among his five sons

Seth Kushaldas and his son Pribhdas received many Afrin Namas from the British Government. Both were granted chairs in the Darbar of the Commissioner in Sindh and the Collector of Nawabshah. The following is the list of Afrinama

- His Excellency the Governor of Bombay had presented an Afrin Nama to Seth Kushaldas for good service rendered by him to all departments and particularly in connection with the new Nanlakhi cut.

- On 25 January 1923 by Collector of Nawabshah gave Afrin Nama to Seth Kushaldas of Taluka Kandiaro in recognition of meritorious service performed by him in giving assistance in repairs to canals

- Letter of Acknowledgment accompanied by a lungi was given to Seth Kushaldas as evidence of his good service by Robert Giles Commissioner in Sind on 19 January 1899 and 27 July 1902.

- On 25 January 1919 Collector of Nawabshah gave Afrin Nama to Seth Kushaldas Lekhraj Golani in Connection with Second Indian War Loan.

- One of the certificates showing Seth Priphdas Kushaldas Golani granted the privilege of a Chair in the Darbar of the Commissioner in Sind Walter Frank Hudson. This Certificate is signed by Walter Frank Hudson on 13 July 1927

Above is Photograph of Seth Pribhdas Kushaldas Golani

The list of such Afrin Namas is endless and original copies are still available with the family members. The family left all its wealth and abandoned its palaces to move to Bombay (Mumbai), Delhi and Baroda (Vadodara) after the Partition of India and Pakistan. In 1950 the Monarchy system was abolished in India.

Members of this family are spread throughout the world. It has famous names like Lekhraj Golani, Khusaldas Golani, Bhagwandas Golani, Hashmatrai Golani, Harkishandas Golani, Jivanlal H. Golani, Rajiv J. Golani. Ravin R. Golani, Suryakant B. Golani, Rajender Golani, Ashok Golani, Vivek Golani, Jaiyu Golani, Anup Golani, Mamta Golani, Sanjiv Golani, Gaurav Golani, Vaibhav Golani, Kshitij Golani, Nilesh Golani, Dinesh Golani, Kushaldas Golani, and Sama Golani. The Turban of Kushaldas Golani is still famous among Sindhis.
