= Battle of Megiddo =

Battle of Megiddo may refer to:

- Battle of Megiddo (15th century BC), between the Egyptians and the Canaanites
- Battle of Megiddo (609 BC), between the Egyptians and the Judahites
- Battle of Megiddo (1918), between the United Kingdom and the Ottoman Empire
- Armageddon (הַר מְגִדּוֹ Hār Məgīddō), a prophesied catastrophic end-of-the-world battle in the Abrahamic religions

== See also ==
- Megiddo (disambiguation)
