= Aaron Campbell (voice actor) =

American voice actor (born 1991)

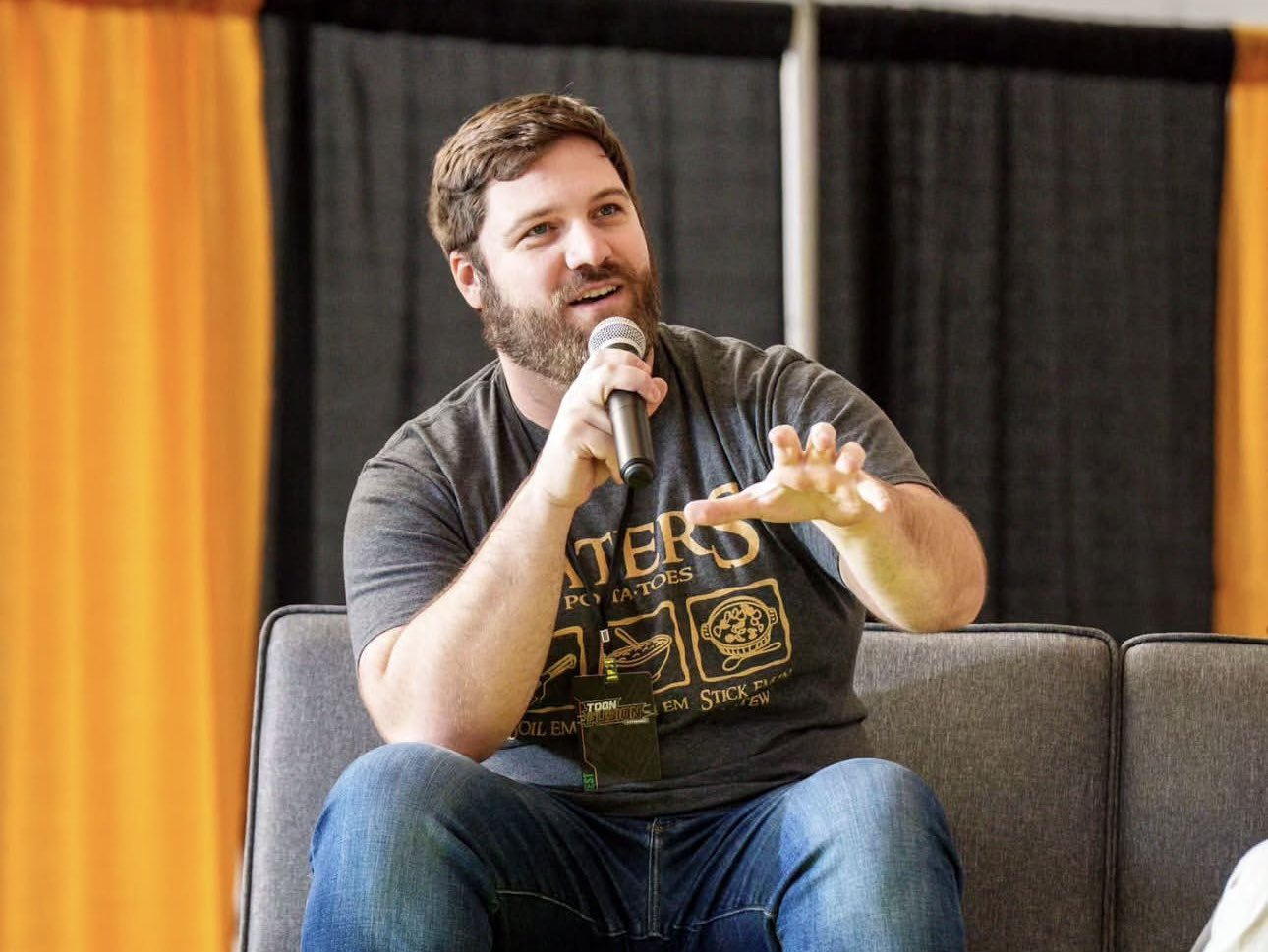
- Born: John Aaron Campbell; September 17, 1991 (age 35)
- Education: Southern Methodist University
- Occupation: Voice actor
- Years active: 2019–present
- Website: aaroncampbellvo.com

Aaron Campbell (born September 17, 1991) is an American voice actor, most known for his voice work in English dubs of Japanese anime. Notable roles include Madoka from Chainsaw Man, Perospero and Napoleon from One Piece, Red from Banished from the Hero's Party, I Decided to Live a Quiet Life in the Countryside, Majestic and Kotaro Shimura from My Hero Academia, Gauma from SSSS.Dynazenon, Aizo Shibasaki from Heroines Run the Show, Makoto Shibe from Tomodachi Game, Kuroto Nakano from The Helpful Fox Senko-san, Itsuki Aoyama from Stand My Heroes, Taichi Narata from Kageki Shojo!! Morisawa Chiaki from Ensemble Stars!, and Mukohda from Campfire Cooking in Another World.

== Career ==
Following his graduation from Drury University with a degree in Theatre and Multimedia Production and Journalism, Campbell served as a news anchor and reporter at FOX 5 KRBK from 2014 to 2017. Campbell later obtained his M.F.A in Acting at Southern Methodist University in 2020 and began focusing on acting and voice work. Originally starting his voice over career, he's been in more than one hundred and fifty titles since 2017.

== Filmography ==
=== Anime ===
List of English dubbing performances in anime
Year	Title	Role	Notes	Source
2019	The Helpful Fox Senko-san	Kuroto Nakano	Main Character	
2019	The Ones Within	Kaikoku Onigasaki		
2019	Mix	Kita		
2019	Arifureta: From Commonplace to World's Strongest	Ryutaro Sakagami		
2019	Ensemble Stars!	Morisawa Chiaki		
2019	Stand My Heroes	Itsuki Aoyama		
2019	Dr. Stone	Kyoichiro	Ep. 18-19	
2019	ACTORS: Songs Connection	Sosuke Kagura	Main Character	
2020	Case File nº221: Kabukicho	Harukiyo Matsumoto	Ep. 14	
2020	Toilet-Bound Hanako-kun	Yamabuki Lemon		
2020	Wandering Witch: The Journey of Elaina	Elaina's Dead	Ep. 1	
2020	Fruits Basket	Doctor, Machi's Younger Brother	Ep. 43–49	
2021	Black Clover	Onoby Sinho	Supporting	
2021	Attack on Titan	Carlo		
2021	Kuma Kuma Kuma Bear	Damon		
2021	Mushoku Tensei: Jobless Reincatnation	Almanfi		
2021	SSSS.Dynazenon	Gauma	Main Character	
2021	Scarlet Nexus	Wataru Frazer	Supporting	
2021	Kageki Shojo!!	Taichi Narata		
2021	My Hero Academia	Kotaro Shimura		
2021	Banished from the Hero's Party, I Decided to Live a Quiet Life in the Countryside	Red / Gideon	Main Character	
2021	Heaven Official's Blessing	Pei Ming, Pei Xiu	Supporting	Tweet
2022	Heroines Run the Show	Aizo Shibasaki	Main Character	
2022	Requiem of the Rose King	George	Supporting	
2022	Tomodachi Game	Makoto Shibe	Main Character	
2022	One Piece	Charlotte Perospero		Tweet
2022	Spy × Family	Bondman		
2022	Overlord	Philip Dayton L'Eye Monstserrat	Supporting	
2022	Skeleton Knight in Another World	Cetrion	Supporting	
2022	Prince of Tennis	Hikaru Zaizen		
2022	Shadows House	William		
2022	Tsukimichi: Moonlit Fantasy	Lime Latte	Supporting	
2022	She Professed Herself Pupil of the Wise Man	Joachim		
2022	Sing "Yesterday" for Me	Rikuo Uozumi	Main Character	
2022	Blue Lock	Jingo Raichi		
2023	Revenger	Raizo Kurima	Main Character	
2023	I Got a Cheat Skill in Another World and Became Unrivaled in the Real World, Too	Reigar von Alceria	Ep. 11–13	
2024	Campfire Cooking in Another World with My Absurd Skill	Tsuyoshi Mukouda	Main Character	
2024	Wind Breaker	Hajime Umemiya		
2024	Shy Season 2	Stardust		
2024	Alya Sometimes Hides Her Feelings in Russian	Touya Kenzaki	Supporting	
2024	Fairy Tail: 100 Years Quest	Mercphobia		
2024	Nina the Starry Bride	Nina's Dad		
2025	The Ossan Newbie Adventurer	Rick Gladiator		
2025	Zenshu	Soldiers		
2025	Failure Frame	Agito		
2025	Dragon Ball Daima	Majin Duu		Tweet
2025	My Hero Academia: Vigilantes	Number 6		
2025	Yakuza Fiancé: Raise wa Tanin ga Ii	Shoma		
2025	Sword of the Demon Hunter: Kijin Gentōshō	Jinta/Jinya		
2025	To Be Hero X	Smile		
2025	Bogus Skill "Fruitmaster"	Grouse		
2026	The Villainess Is Adored by the Prince of the Neighbor Kingdom	Aquasteed		
2026	Daemons of the Shadow Realm	Hikaru "Hagure" Kagemori		
2026	The Daily Life of a Middle-Aged Online Shopper in Another World	Nyakero		

=== Film and Commercial Work ===
Year	Title	Role	Source
2017	The Raven's Prey	Farmer	
2018	Murder Made Me Famous	Student	
2025	Batman Ninja vs. Yakuza League	Kuraku Hagane / Kal-El / Clark Kent / Superman	
