= Hakumei and Mikochi =

Japanese manga series

- Cover of Hakumei and Mikochi volume 1 by Enterbrain

ハクメイとミコチ (Hakumei to Mikochi)
- Genre: Fantasy, iyashikei
- Manga
- Written by: Takuto Kashiki
- Published by: Enterbrain
- English publisher: NA: Yen Press
- Magazine: Harta
- Original run: 2011 – present
- Volumes: 14
- Anime television series
- Directed by: Masaomi Andō
- Produced by: Japanese; Kazufumi Kikushima; Mieko Tsuruta; Mitsuhiro Ogata; Noritomo Isogai; Shinpei Yamashita; English; John Ledford
- Written by: Reiko Yoshida
- Music by: Evan Call
- Studio: Lerche
- Licensed by: NA: Sentai Filmworks
- Original network: AT-X, Tokyo MX, Sun TV, KBS Kyoto, TV Aichi, TVQ, BS11
- Original run: January 12, 2018 – March 30, 2018
- Episodes: 12 + OVA
- icon

Hakumei and Mikochi (Japanese: ハクメイとミコチ, Hepburn: Hakumei to Mikochi) is a Japanese manga series by Takuto Kashiki. It has been serialized since 2011 in Enterbrain's seinen manga magazine Fellows!, which was renamed to Harta in 2013. It has been collected in fourteen tankōbon volumes. A 12-episode anime television series adaptation by Lerche aired from January 12 to March 30, 2018. An original video animation was included on the second Blu-ray/DVD volume released on June 27, 2018. Sentai Filmworks licensed the anime.

== Synopsis ==
In a mystical forest in a world inhabited by people only a few centimeters tall and talking animals, the relaxed story focuses on the daily lives and adventures of two of those tiny women living together in a house in a tree; the tomboyish Hakumei and serene, ladylike Mikochi.

== Characters ==
Hakumei (ハクメイ)
Voiced by: Risae Matsuda (Japanese); Brittney Karbowski (English)
One of the protagonists, red-haired and energetic. She is a diligent and skilled craftswoman, but tends to get herself and others in dangerous situations nonetheless. She was homeless and on her own, before moving in with Mikochi, in the town of Makinata.
Mikochi (ミコチ)
Voiced by: Shino Shimoji (Japanese); Amanda Lee (English)
The dark-haired protagonist. She is a well-respected cook and prepares food and other goods to be sold in a nearby store.
Konju (コンジュ, Konju)
Voiced by: Aoi Yūki (Japanese); Allison Sumrall (English)
A songstress who befriends Mikochi.
Sen (セン)
Voiced by: Chika Anzai (Japanese); Kira Vincent-Davis (English)
A researcher who uses animated skeletons to work for her.
Iwashi (イワシ)
Voiced by: Masaya Matsukaze (Japanese); Ty Mahany (English)
A weasel and Hakumei's senior colleague.
Kobone Master
Voiced by: Megumi Ogata (Japanese); Shelley Calene-Black (English)
Owner-manager of a café/pub frequented by Mikochi and Hakumei.

== Media ==
=== Manga ===
No.	Original release date	Original ISBN	English release date	English ISBN
1	January 15, 2013	978-4-04-728634-4	July 24, 2018	978-1-9753-8118-9
2	January 14, 2014	978-4-04-729394-6	October 30, 2018	978-1-9753-0290-0
3	January 15, 2015	978-4-04-730154-2	December 11, 2018	978-1-9753-0293-1
4	January 15, 2016	978-4-04-730926-5	February 19, 2019	978-1-9753-0294-8
5	January 14, 2017	978-4-04-734413-6	April 23, 2019	978-1-9753-0295-5
6	January 15, 2018	978-4-04-734820-2	June 18, 2019	978-1-9753-5738-2
7	January 15, 2019	978-4-04-735337-4	September 17, 2019	978-1-9753-3231-0
8	January 14, 2020	978-4-04-735786-0	January 26, 2021	978-1-9753-1693-8
9	January 15, 2021	978-4-04-736272-7	February 22, 2022	978-1-9753-3552-6
10	January 15, 2022	978-4-04-736762-3	January 17, 2023	978-1-9753-6014-6
11	January 14, 2023	978-4-04-737172-9	January 23, 2024	978-1-9753-8043-4
12	January 15, 2024	978-4-04-737629-8; 978-4-04-737630-4 (SE)	January 21, 2025	979-8-8554-0686-3
13	January 15, 2025	978-4-04-738106-3	January 20, 2026	979-8-8554-2438-6
14	January 15, 2026	978-4-04-738567-2	—	—

=== Anime ===
A 12-episode anime television series adaptation by Lerche aired in Japan from January 12 to March 30, 2018. It is directed by Masaomi Andō and with series composition by Reiko Yoshida. The opening theme is "urar" by Chima, and the ending theme is "Harvest Moon Night" performed by voice actresses Shino Shimoji (Mikochi) and Aoi Yūki (Konju). Ending theme lyrics are unique to each episode referring to the episode's plot. Sentai Filmworks licensed the anime and streamed it on Hidive. The English dub was released on March 19, 2019.

No.	Title (Note: All English episode titles are taken from Hidive.)	Original release date
1	"Yesterday's Dark Red"; Transliteration: "Kinō no Akane" (Japanese: きのうの茜)	January 12, 2018
1	"Marketplace Shanty"; Transliteration: "Funauta no Ichiba" (Japanese: 舟歌の市場)	January 12, 2018
After reading in the newspaper that a wish-granting red "evening kite" was sighted in the mountains, Hakumei wants to catch it. Hitching a ride on beetles, Mikochi tells Hakumei about a white bird, Kafu, she considered her pet. Every morning she would feed it minestrone, until one day it stopped coming. Atop the mountain eating minestrone the women are caught by surprise as a bird snatches their soup. It turns out Kafu is the evening kite, appearing red in the light of dusk, while Mikochi only knew it shining white in the dawn. Mikochi shows Hakumei the nearby bustling market and port town Arabi, where Mikochi is well-known for her expertise in food preparation, and introduces her to a friend, the "master" of café/tavern Kobone.
2	"The Two Songstresses"; Transliteration: "Futari no Utahime" (Japanese: ふたりの歌姫)	January 19, 2018
2	"The Glass Lamp"; Transliteration: "Garasu no Akari" (Japanese: ガラスの灯)	January 19, 2018
2	"A Cup of Coffee"; Transliteration: "Ippuku no Kōhī" (Japanese: 一服の珈琲)	January 19, 2018
Hakumei and Mikochi are in town and Mikochi gets voted first place in a singing contest, tied with songstress Konju, even though Mikochi did not participate, because she and her singing are so popular. At first Konju is disgruntled, but the next day Mikochi helps her with a household remedy for her sore throat. On the day of the harvest festival they sing together and mesh so well tsukumogami start to dance in the streets. Hakumei and Mikochi are fishing at night and get startled by a ghost fish, that turns out to be one of the animal carcasses animated by scientist Sen, who explains her research to them. Hakumei tries to repair the Kobone Master's old coffee grinder, while the Master tells Hakumei and Mikochi its - and her own - history, but Hakumei fails. As it turns out, the grinder is a tsukumogami and had decided it is time to retire.
3	"Starlit Sky and Ponkan"; Transliteration: "Hoshizora to Ponkan" (Japanese: 星空とポンカン)	January 26, 2018
3	"Work Day"; Transliteration: "Shigoto no Hi" (Japanese: 仕事の日)	January 26, 2018
Hakumei accidentally blows up their house, when she tries to make fireworks. While Sen uses her animated carcasses to rebuild the house (in her own style), they go camping below a Ponkan tree. Unfortunately, they do not consider the dangers of windfall. Hakumei and Iwashi repair a windmill.
4	"Work Day 2"; Transliteration: "Shigoto no Hi 2" (Japanese: 仕事の日2)	February 2, 2018
4	"Horned Owls and Old Tales"; Transliteration: "Mimizuku to Mukashibanashi" (Japanese: ミミズクと昔話)	February 2, 2018
Konju visits Mikochi and wants to help her with her work, preparing food and other convenience goods. Konju's cooking efforts pose a threat to the newly rebuild house, but that is soon forgotten when she teaches an overjoyed Mikochi how to make scented soap. Picking herbs, Mikochi and Hakumei are startled by an intimidating owl and take refugee in a cave.
5	"The Association's Work Site"; Transliteration: "Kumiai no Genba" (Japanese: 組合の現場)	February 9, 2018
5	"Large Stones and Joint Stones"; Transliteration: "Ōiwa to Kai Ishi" (Japanese: 大岩と飼い石)	February 9, 2018
Iwashi introduces Hakumei to the chairman of the local construction association, Narai, and his deputy, Katen, as she wants to participate in the rebuilding of a stone wall along a road that was damaged in a landslide. The chairman rejects her, but she goes to the work site maintaining Iwashi's tools. Impressed by her resolve and the respect and sincerity she shows for her colleagues and work, the chairman allows her to join the workers. Mikochi arrives at the construction site to help Narai's wife, Hakuyo, cooking for the workers. Hakumei proves her worth noticing a dangerous oversight on the chairman's part and proposing a method to cut a big stone.
6	"The Egg Beautician"; Transliteration: "Tamago no Biyōshi" (Japanese: 卵の美容師)	February 16, 2018
6	"A Day Off"; Transliteration: "Yasumi no Hi" (Japanese: 休みの日)	February 16, 2018
6	"The Egg Beautician - Day 2"; Transliteration: "Tamago no Biyōshi - Betsu no Hi" (Japanese: 卵の美容師 - 別の日)	February 16, 2018
Hakumei stumbles upon an egg house that is the home and hairdresser's shop of a woman named Jada and out of curiosity asks for a haircut. After getting a short hair cut and becoming friends with Jada, Hakumei learns why the house does not roll away: it is bolted into the ground. Hakumei and Mikochi go to town on their day off with Iwashi who usually avoids going there. (post-credits) Hakumei and Mikochi accompany Konju to Jada's shop, but they end up refining Jada's limoncello recipe instead of getting Konju a haircut.
7	"A Ladder in the Tree"; Transliteration: "Jujō no Hashigo" (Japanese: 樹上の梯子)	February 23, 2018
7	"The Metropolitan Lifestyle"; Transliteration: "Tokai-tekina Seikatsu" (Japanese: 都会的な生活)	February 23, 2018
7	"Photo of a Smile"; Transliteration: "Egao no Shashin" (Japanese: 笑顔の写真)	February 23, 2018
Hakumei and Mikochi are surprised a lot of people moved into the tree they live in. They climb the tree to get to know their new neighbors, among them a timid little beetle new in town, and a flying squirrel who sells juice. The timid beetle, Koharu, has befriended Mikochi and Hakumei and asks for their help furnishing her home in an urban style as she deems necessary for her new life as a city girl. Hakumei and Mikochi meet Mimi, a jerboa and wandering photographer, and invite her to stay with them for the night.
8	"A Long Day"; Transliteration: "Nagai Ichinichi" (Japanese: 長い一日)	March 2, 2018
Hakumei and Mikochi get roped into a conflict in the artists' colony where Konju lives.
9	"Rhythm of the River Bottom"; Transliteration: "Minasoko no Rizumu" (Japanese: 水底のリズム)	March 9, 2018
9	"Dry Goods of the Stubborn"; Transliteration: "Korishō no Somemono" (Japanese: 凝り性の染め物)	March 9, 2018
Hakumei, Mikochi and Konju accompany Sen on the maiden voyage of her new submarine boat. Hakumei and Sen assist Mikochi who makes a new dress for Sen.
10	"Hot Bamboo Bath"; Transliteration: "Take no Yu" (Japanese: 竹の湯)	March 16, 2018
10	"Daikon and Pipes"; Transliteration: "Daikon to Paipu" (Japanese: 大根とパイプ)	March 16, 2018
Hakumei and Mikochi go to an onsen. Disappointed as it is closed for the day, they decide to build an outdoor bathtub. Mikochi's big sister Ayune, a playwright, arrives on a surprise visit.
11	"Overnight Train"; Transliteration: "Yorugoshi no Kisha" (Japanese: 夜越しの汽車)	March 23, 2018
11	"Rain and Tenkara"; Transliteration: "Ame to Tenkara" (Japanese: 雨とテンカラ)	March 23, 2018
Mikochi and Hakumei take an overnight train to Lake Kanokan where they want to go fishing. Even though it is raining Hakumei and Mikochi go angling, but to no avail. At the recommendation of a hedgehog they know from the train ride they switch to tenkara fishing. When Mikochi confesses to Hakumei that fishing bores her, a fish takes the bait, but escapes. However, the hedgehog captures the fish and when Mikochi sees how huge it is, she changes her opinion on fishing.
12	"Memory of Dark Red Hair"; Transliteration: "Kurenai kami no kioku" (Japanese: 紅髪の記憶)	March 30, 2018
Mikochi accompanies Hakumei on a short trip as Hakumei wants to use an opportunity to catch a glimpse of the caravan she had been traveling with before she met Mikochi. Along the way Hakumei tells Mikochi about her past and how she came to stay in Makinata.
