= Chasing After Aoi Koshiba =

Japanese manga series

- Volume 1 tankōbon cover, featuring the two protagonists, Aoi Koshiba (left) and Sahoko Narita

今日、小柴葵に会えたら (Kyō, Koshiba Aoi ni Aetara)
- Genre: Romance; School life; Yuri
- Manga
- Written by: Hazuki Takeoka
- Illustrated by: Fly
- Published by: Ichijinsha
- English publisher: NA: Kodansha USA
- Magazine: Monthly Comic Rex
- Original run: November 27, 2018 – March 26, 2022
- Volumes: 4

Chasing After Aoi Koshiba (今日、小柴葵に会えたら, Kyō, Koshiba Aoi ni Aetara) is a Japanese yuri manga written by Hazuki Takeoka and illustrated by Fly. It was serialized in Ichijinsha's Monthly Comic Rex from November 2018 to March 2022. It is licensed in English release in North America by Kodansha USA. The series follows Sahoko Narita and her changing relationships with her high school's star basketball player Aoi Koshiba.

== Plot ==
In the summer of her sophomore year of high school, Sahoko Narita, a girl trying to climb the social ladder, met Aoi Koshiba, the school's star basketball player. After an unexpected kiss the two got closer little by little and confirm their feelings for each other. However, Sahoko comes to realizes that her feelings for Aoi may just be "feelings" as a friend. Sahoko and Aoi finally must come to terms with their relationship, past and present, when brought together at their high school reunion.

== Publication ==
Written by Hazuki Takeoka and illustrated by Fly, Chasing After Aoi Koshiba was serialized in Ichijinsha's Monthly Comic Rex from November 27, 2018, to March 26, 2022. The series was collected in four tankōbon volumes from July 2019 to July 2022.

The series is licensed for an English release in North America by Kodansha USA.

| No. | Original release date | Original ISBN | English release date | English ISBN |
|---|---|---|---|---|
| 1 | July 29, 2019 | 9784758068208 | April 27, 2021 | 9781646511860 |
| 2 | June 27, 2020 | 9784758068703 | August 31, 2021 | 9781646511884 |
| 3 | July 27, 2021 | 9784758069359 | March 1, 2022 | 9781646512454 |
| 4 | July 27, 2022 | 9784758069915 | March 9, 2023 | 9781646513581 |

== Reception ==
In Anime News Network's Spring 2021 Manga Guide Rebecca Silverman gave the first volume a rating of 3.5 out of 5, while Lynzee Loveridge gave it a 3 out of 5. Silverman praised Fly's "beautiful art" and felt the story itself was worth paying attention to; noting that "even if there's no happy ending for these two, their story has enough pull to make it worth finding out for sure." Loveridge remarked that Chasing After Aoi Koshiba's biggest hurdle was "keep[ing] readers coming back when it stars a wholly unlikable protagonist."

Erica Friedman of Yuricon found the high school period of the series less interesting than the prospects of the ten year time skip, however she praised the ending of the series, stating that "it was a powerful ending that ended the story, for sure. There was no moving forward after that. I wouldn't call it brave, but it took some small risk and I appreciate that. More series need to really think about whether relationships ought to work. Takeoka Hazuki put some thought into that. I appreciate it."

== See also ==
- Masamune-kun's Revenge, another manga series written by Hazuki Takeoka
- Bottom-tier Character Tomozaki, a light novel series illustrated by Fly
- The Girl I Saved on the Train Turned Out to Be My Childhood Friend, another light novel series illustrated by Fly
- Iroduku: The World in Colors, an original anime television series with character designs by Fly
