= Hazure Skill =

Japanese light novel series

- Hazure Skill: The Guild Member with a Worthless Skill Is Actually a Legendary Assassin
- Cover of the first light novel volume

外れスキル「影が薄い」を持つギルド職員が、実は伝説の暗殺者 (Hazure Sukiru "Kage ga Usui" o Motsu Guild Shokuin ga, Jitsuha Densetsu no Ansatsusha)
- Genre: Fantasy
- Novel series
- Written by: Kennoji
- Published by: Shōsetsuka ni Narō
- Original run: June 19, 2018 – present
- Light novel
- Written by: Kennoji
- Illustrated by: KWKM
- Published by: Fujimi Shobo
- English publisher: NA: Yen Press
- Imprint: Kadokawa Books
- Original run: March 9, 2019 – present
- Volumes: 7
- Manga
- Written by: Kennoji
- Illustrated by: Fuh Araki
- Published by: ASCII Media Works
- English publisher: NA: Yen Press
- Imprint: Dengeki Comics Next
- Magazine: Dengeki PlayStation Comic Web
- Original run: July 5, 2019 – present
- Volumes: 9
- icon

Hazure Skill: The Guild Member with a Worthless Skill Is Actually a Legendary Assassin (Japanese: 外れスキル「影が薄い」を持つギルド職員が、実は伝説の暗殺者, Hepburn: Hazure Sukiru "Kage ga Usui" o Motsu Guild Shokuin ga, Jitsuha Densetsu no Ansatsusha) is a Japanese light novel series written by Kennoji. The series originated on the Shōsetsuka ni Narō website in June 2018, before being published in print with illustrations by KWKM by Fujimi Shobo beginning in March 2019. A manga adaptation with illustrations by Fuh Araki began serialization in the ComicWalker-based Dengeki PlayStation Comic Web manga service in July 2019. The series follows Roland, a talented assassin who chooses to live a more ordinary life by working for a local Adventurers' Guild.

== Media ==
=== Light novel ===
Written by Kennoji, the series began publication on the novel posting website Shōsetsuka ni Narō on June 19, 2018. The series was later acquired by Fujimi Shobo, who began publishing the series in print with illustrations by KWKM on March 9, 2019. As of August 2021, seven volumes have been released.

In October 2020, Yen Press announced that they licensed the series for English publication.

==== Volumes ====
| No. | Original release date | Original ISBN | English release date | English ISBN |
|---|---|---|---|---|
| 1 | March 9, 2019 | 978-4-04-073084-4 | April 6, 2021 | 978-1-9753-1877-2 |
| 2 | July 10, 2019 | 978-4-04-073086-8 | October 5, 2021 | 978-1-9753-1879-6 |
| 3 | December 10, 2019 | 978-4-04-073381-4 | March 15, 2022 | 978-1-9753-1881-9 |
| 4 | June 10, 2020 | 978-4-04-073599-3 | September 20, 2022 | 978-1-9753-4799-4 |
| 5 | October 10, 2020 | 978-4-04-073827-7 | May 23, 2023 | 978-1-9753-4831-1 |
| 6 | March 10, 2021 | 978-4-04-074004-1 | September 19, 2023 | 978-1-9753-6911-8 |
| 7 | August 10, 2021 | 978-4-04-074154-3 | January 7, 2024 | 978-1-9753-7115-9 |

=== Manga ===
A manga adaptation with illustrations by Fuh Araki began serialization in the ComicWalker-based Dengeki PlayStation Comic Web manga service on July 5, 2019. As of February 2026, the series' individual chapters have been collected into nine tankōbon volumes.

Yen Press is also publishing the manga in English.

==== Volumes ====
| No. | Original release date | Original ISBN | English release date | English ISBN |
|---|---|---|---|---|
| 1 | December 9, 2019 | 978-4-04-912884-0 | May 4, 2021 | 978-1-9753-2437-7 |
| 2 | June 27, 2020 | 978-4-04-913244-1 | November 9, 2021 | 978-1-9753-2514-5 |
| 3 | January 9, 2021 | 978-4-04-913604-3 | December 14, 2021 | 978-1-9753-3611-0 |
| 4 | August 10, 2021 | 978-4-04-913912-9 | July 12, 2022 | 978-1-9753-4442-9 |
| 5 | March 26, 2022 | 978-4-04-914300-3 | February 28, 2023 | 978-1-9753-6091-7 |
| 6 | March 27, 2023 | 978-4-04-914728-5 | March 19, 2024 | 978-1-9753-8047-2 |
| 7 | March 27, 2024 | 978-4-04-915581-5 | April 1, 2025 | 979-8-8554-1257-4 |
| 8 | February 27, 2025 | 978-4-04-916259-2 | April 28, 2026 | 979-8-8554-2767-7 |
| 9 | February 27, 2026 | 978-4-04-916940-9 | — | — |

== Reception ==
Demelza from Anime UK News criticized the story for its sex scenes and the main character as generic. Rebecca Silverman from Anime News Network felt the series was a bit generic, though she also positively noted that the series had little fan service despite the sex scenes.

== See also ==
- Drugstore in Another World, another light novel series written by Kennoji
- The Girl I Saved on the Train Turned Out to Be My Childhood Friend, another light novel series written by Kennoji
- Failure Frame: I Became the Strongest and Annihilated Everything with Low-Level Spells, another light novel series illustrated by KWKM
- My Sword Saint Master Is Too Cute to Live With!, a manga series written by Kennoji
