= My Sword Saint Master Is Too Cute to Live With! =

Japanese manga series

- First tankōbon volume cover, featuring Liza Parsandra

同居している剣聖の女師匠が可愛すぎて毎日幸せです (Dōkyo Shiteiru Kensei no Onna Shishō ga Kawaisugite Mainichi Shiawase)
- Genre: Fantasy; Romantic comedy
- Manga
- Written by: Kennoji
- Illustrated by: R_ringo
- Published by: Media Factory
- English publisher: NA: Seven Seas Entertainment
- Imprint: MF Comics
- Magazine: KadoComi (Web Comic Apanta)
- Original run: March 21, 2024 – present
- Volumes: 2
- Anime television series
- Directed by: Masayoshi Nishida
- Written by: Yōhei Kashii
- Music by: 12sound
- Studio: Wolfsbane; Lightbox
- Original run: January 2027 – scheduled

My Sword Saint Master Is Too Cute to Live With! (Japanese: 同居している剣聖の女師匠が可愛すぎて毎日幸せです, Hepburn: Dōkyo Shiteiru Kensei no Onna Shishō ga Kawaisugite Mainichi Shiawase Desu; lit. 'The Female Sword Master I Live With is So Cute I'm Happy Every Day') is a Japanese manga series written by Kennoji and illustrated by R_ringo. It has been serialized online via Kadokawa's KadoComi website under Media Factory's Web Comic Apanta label since March 2024 and has been collected in two tankōbon volumes. An anime television series adaptation produced by Wolfsbane and Lightbox is set to premiere in January 2027.

== Plot ==
Eugene Dawson is a swordsman-in-training who desires to become stronger. To that end, he lives with the female swordmaster Liza Parsandra, who is known as the "sword saint". However, while she may be skilled with a sword, she is clumsy in her private life, leading to various awkward situations.

== Characters ==
Liza Parsandra (リザ・バルサンドラ, Riza Barusandora)
Voiced by: Ai Kakuma
Eugene Dawson (ユージン・ドーソン, Yūjin Dōson)
Voiced by: Seena Hoshiki
Cordelia Dawson (コルデリア・ドーソン, Koruderia Dōson)
Voiced by: Hitomi Ueda
Erin Toa (エリン・トーア, Erin Tōa)
Voiced by: Azusa Tsujimori
Meris Eclipse (メリス・エクリプス, Merisu Ekuripusu)
Voiced by: Tomoyo Takayanagi
Fiona Rosso (フィオナ・ロッソ)
Voiced by: Miyu Tomita
Lumiere Theomere (リュミエル・セオメイル, Ryumieru Seomeiru)
Voiced by: Minami Takahashi

== Media ==
=== Manga ===
Written by Kennoji and illustrated by R_ringo, My Sword Saint Master Is Too Cute to Live With! began serialization on Kadokawa's KadoComi website under Media Factory's Web Comic Apanta label on March 21, 2024. Its chapters have been collected into two tankōbon volumes as of January 2026.

During their panel at Anime Expo 2026, Seven Seas Entertainment announced that they had licensed the series for English publication under their Ghost Ship imprint.

No.	Original release date	Original ISBN	North American release date	North American ISBN
1	January 22, 2025	978-4-04-684209-1	June 1, 2027	979-8-90209-855-3
Chapters 1–5; Bonus: Deshi kara Otto e...? (弟子から夫へ...?); Bonus: Merisu no Mōsō (メリスの妄想)
2	January 23, 2026	978-4-04-685397-4	—	—
Chapters 6–10; Bonus (おまけ, Omake)

=== Anime ===
An anime television series adaptation was announced in the second volume of the manga released on January 23, 2026. The series will be produced under WWWave Corporation's Deregula anime label, animated by Wolfsbane and Lightbox and directed by Masayoshi Nishida, with series composition handled by Yōhei Kashii, characters designed by Ichirō Tanaka, and music composed by 12sound. Hitomi Ueda will narrate the series. It is set to premiere in January 2027.

== See also ==
- Drugstore in Another World, a light novel series written by Kennoji
- The Girl I Saved on the Train Turned Out to Be My Childhood Friend, a light novel series written by Kennoji
- Hazure Skill, a light novel series written by Kennoji
