= Satsumi Matsuda =

Japanese voice actress

- 松田 颯水
- Born: July 17, 1993 (age 33); Takatsuki, Osaka, Japan
- Occupation: Voice actress
- Years active: 2013–present
- Agent: Arts Vision
- Relatives: Risae Matsuda (sister)

Satsumi Matsuda (松田 颯水, Matsuda Satsumi; born July 17, 1993) is a Japanese voice actress affiliated with Arts Vision. She is the younger twin sister of Risae Matsuda. Both were the 4th and 5th Anisong Grand Prix Finalists with Marina Kawano (4th) and Konomi Suzuki (5th).

== Filmography ==
=== Television animation ===
2014

- Saki: The Nationals, Hiroe Atago

2015

- The Idolmaster Cinderella Girls, Syoko Hoshi
- Ultimate Otaku Teacher, Komiya Nagare

2016

- Fune o Amu, Sen
- Koukaku no Pandora, Vlind
- Magical Girl Raising Project, Yuna Amasato
- The Asterisk War, Shenyun Li

2017

- Battle Girl High School, Miku Hoshitsuki
- Clockwork Planet, Vermouth
- Nana Maru San Batsu, Jinko Sasajima
- The Idolmaster Cinderella Girls Theater, Syoko Hoshi

2018

- Kaiju Girls, Guts Shadow
- Anima Yell!, Tamako Nekoya

2019

- Stars Align, Kei Takada

2020

- Healin' Good Pretty Cure, Touji Sawaizumi, Rina

2021

- Kiyo in Kyoto: From the Maiko House, Tsurukoma
- Kageki Shojo!!, Chiaki Sawada
- Drugstore in Another World, Elaine

2022

- Miss Kuroitsu from the Monster Development Department, Hydra's second and fourth sisters
- Smile of the Arsnotoria the Animation, Spirit
- Arknights: Prelude To Dawn, Misha
- Spy × Family, Kim Campbell (ep. 22)

2023

- Soaring Sky! Pretty Cure, Beryberie
- Jujutsu Kaisen, Nanako Hasaba

2024

- Wonderful Pretty Cure!, Yuki Nekoyashiki / Cure Nyammy
- Kagaku×Bōken Survival, Jio

2025

- Welcome to the Outcast's Restaurant!, Bachel

2026

- Mebius Dust, Kurusu

=== Theatrical animation ===
- Okko's Inn (2018), Makoto Tachiuri
- Survival (2020), Geo
- Jujutsu Kaisen 0 (2021), Nanako Hasaba
- Joshi Kōsei to Mahō no Note (2022), Bulbul-kun

=== Video games ===
- The Idolm@ster Cinderella Girls (xxxx), Syoko Hoshi
- Shirohime Quest (xxxx)
- Metal Max 4: Gekkō no Diva (xxxx)
- Exile Election (xxxx), Aasha Tadenomiya
- Azur Lane (2017), KMS Madgeburg
- Onsen Musume: Yunohana Collection (xxxx), Erina Ibusuki
- Master of Eternity (2018), Anna
- Livestream: Escape from Hotel Izanami (2021), Azusa Shiraishi
- Sentimental Death Loop (2023), Suzuka Hayami
- Umamusume: Pretty Derby (2025), Stay Gold

=== Tokusatsu ===
- Kikai Sentai Zenkaiger (2021), Ricky Goldtsuiker/TwokaiRicky (voice)

=== Dubbing ===
==== Live-action ====
- 28 Years Later: The Bone Temple, Jimmy Ink / Kellie (Erin Kellyman)
- Independence Day: Resurgence, Daisy Blackwell (Mckenna Grace)
