= Risae Matsuda =

Japanese voice actress

- 松田 利冴
- Born: July 16, 1993 (age 33); Takatsuki, Osaka, Japan
- Occupation: Voice actress
- Years active: 2013–present
- Agent: I'm Enterprise
- Notable work: Shomin Sample as Maya Mibu; Astra Lost in Space as Luca Esposito; Drugstore in Another World as Noella; The Asterisk War as Li Shenhua; Hakumei and Mikochi as Hakumei; Lapis Re:Lights as Lucifer; Kageki Shojo!! as Chika Sawada
- Relatives: Satsumi Matsuda (sister)

Risae Matsuda (松田 利冴, Matsuda Risae; born July 16, 1993) is a Japanese voice actress who is affiliated with I'm Enterprise. She is the older twin sister of voice actress Satsumi Matsuda. She is known for her roles as Hakumei in Hakumei and Mikochi and Noella in Drugstore in Another World.

== Biography ==
Matsuda was born in Takatsuki, Osaka on July 16, 1993, one day before her younger twin sister Satsumi. In 2010 and 2011, she and Satsumi participated in the Animax Anison Grand Prix, after which both enrolled at the Japan Narration Actor Institute.

Matsuda made her voice acting debut in 2014, playing background roles in The Irregular at Magic High School and Sword Art Online. In 2015, she played the role of Azuna Kuzuha in Dance with Devils. In 2016, she played the role of Minael in Magical Girl Raising Project. In 2018, she played the roles of Kaoru Mashiko in Katana Maidens: Toji No Miko and Hakumei in Hakumei and Mikochi. In 2019, she played Luca Esposito in Astra Lost in Space. In 2020, she played Lucifer in Lapis Re:Lights. In 2021, she played Chika Sawada in Kageki Shojo!! and Noella in Drugstore in Another World.

== Filmography ==
=== Television animation ===
2014

- The Irregular at Magic High School
- Sword Art Online II

2015

- Uta no Prince-sama as Female fan, spectator
- Mysterious Joker as Bela
- Aikatsu! as Ken-chan
- Ultimate Otaku Teacher as Taki Komiya
- Shomin Sample as Maya Mibu
- Dance with Devils as Azuna Kuzuha

2016

- Magical Girl Raising Project as Minael
- Love Live! Sunshine!! as Yoshimi
- The Asterisk War as Li Shenhua
- New Game! as Ren
- Keijo!!!!!!!! as Ai Shimada (episode 4)

2017

- New Game!! as Ren

2018

- Katana Maidens: Toji No Miko as Kaoru Mashiko
- Hakumei and Mikochi as Hakumei
- Laid-Back Camp as Akari Inuyama
- Anima Yell! as Suzuko Nekoya

2019

- Katana Maidens: Mini Toji as Kaoru Mashiko
- Kemono Friends 2 as Leopard
- Kaiju Girls as Miko Innnami
- Astra Lost in Space as Luca Esposito

2020

- Lapis Re:Lights as Lucifer
- Yu-Gi-Oh! Sevens as Hunt Goto

2021

- Kageki Shojo!! as Chika Sawada
- Drugstore in Another World as Noella

2022

- Miss Kuroitsu from the Monster Development Department, Hydra's first and third sisters
- Smile of the Arsnotoria the Animation, Spirit
- Arknights: Prelude To Dawn, Skullshatterer (Alex)

2023

- Jujutsu Kaisen, Mimiko Hasaba

2024

- My Wife Has No Emotion, Licht Nishionji

2025

- Honey Lemon Soda, Mizuki
- Miru: Paths to My Future, Adam

2026

- A Hundred Scenes of Awajima, Momoko Murakami
- Magic Repo Man, Linka

2027

- In a World Full of Zombies I'm the Only One Who Doesn't Get Attacked, Yū Fujino

=== Film animation ===
2021

- Jujutsu Kaisen 0 as Mimiko Hasaba

2022

- Laid-Back Camp Movie as Akari Inuyama

=== Original net animation ===
2021

- The Missing 8 as Emory

2022

- Jewelpet Attack Travel! as O-Saru
