= Kageki Shojo!! =

Japanese manga series

- First tankōbon volume cover

かげきしょうじょ!! (Kageki Shōjo!!)
- Genre: Drama
- Manga

Kageki Shojo! (original); Kageki Shojo!! The Curtain Rises (re-release)
- Written by: Kumiko Saiki
- Published by: Shueisha (original); Hakusensha (re-release)
- English publisher: NA: Seven Seas Entertainment
- Magazine: Jump X
- Original run: May 10, 2012 – October 10, 2014
- Volumes: 2 (original); 1 (re-release)
- Manga
- Written by: Kumiko Saiki
- Published by: Hakusensha
- English publisher: NA: Seven Seas Entertainment
- Magazine: Melody
- Original run: February 28, 2015 – present
- Volumes: 16
- Anime television series
- Directed by: Kazuhiro Yoneda
- Produced by: Yutaka Suwa; Akiko Yada
- Written by: Tadashi Morishita; Miyako Matsumoto; Shinichi Inotsume
- Music by: Tsuneyoshi Saito
- Studio: Pine Jam
- Licensed by: Crunchyroll
- Original network: AT-X, Tokyo MX, BS11, HTB
- Original run: July 4, 2021 – September 26, 2021
- Episodes: 13
- icon

Kageki Shojo!! (かげきしょうじょ!!, Kageki Shōjo!!) is a Japanese manga series by Kumiko Saiki. It was serialized as Kageki Shojo! (かげきしょうじょ!, Kageki Shōjo!) in Shueisha's seinen manga magazine Jump X from 2012 to 2014 and was collected in two tankōbon volumes. It was later re-released as Kageki Shojo!! Season Zero (かげきしょうじょ!! シーズンゼロ, Kageki Shōjo!! Shīzun Zero) in a single tankōbon volume by Hakusensha in March 2019. A sequel manga by Saiki has been serialized in Hakusensha's shōjo manga magazine Melody since 2015. It has been collected in sixteen tankōbon volumes. The re-release and the sequel are licensed in North America by Seven Seas Entertainment. An anime television series adaptation produced by Pine Jam aired from July to September 2021.

== Plot ==
Founded in the Taisho era, the Kouka Revue Company (Note: The Kouka Revue is the Kageki Shojo!!'s in-universe counterpart of the famous Japanese all-female musical troupe Takarazuka Revue.) (Japanese: 紅華歌劇団, Hepburn: Kouka Kagekidan) attracts people's hearts across generations on a fashionable stage created only by unmarried women. The 100th class entered the Kouka School of Musical and Theatrical Arts (Note: The Kouka School of Musical and Theatrical Arts is the Kageki Shojo!!'s in-universe counterpart of Takarazuka Revue's Takarazuka Music School.) (Japanese: 紅華歌劇音楽学校, Hepburn: Kouka Ongaku Gakkō) after passing an extremely competitive entrance exam to train in music and dance. Sarasa Watanabe (the main protagonist) is a 1.78m tall student who dreams of acting as an Otokoyaku (i.e. male protagonist) and someday playing the role of Lady Oscar in the Kouka Revue's production of The Rose of Versailles. She forms a friendship with her new roommate, Ai Narata, who is a disgraced J-pop idol and former idol group member who hopes to join the Kouka Revue to escape from her troubled past.

== Characters ==
Sarasa Watanabe (渡辺 さらさ, Watanabe Sarasa)
Voiced by: Sayaka Senbongi (Japanese); Siv Ryan (English)
She is a Kouka actress-aspirant at the Kouka School who stands out from the rest of the Centennial Class and the entire school, and not just because of her bubbly demeanor and being the tallest student in the school.
Ai Narata (奈良田 愛, Narata Ai)
Voiced by: Yumiri Hanamori (Japanese); Xanthe Huynh (English)
A former idol expelled from her group because of her trust issues with men, she applied at the Kouka School to escape her past and men in particular. She finds Sarasa, her classmate and dorm-mate, to be annoying at first.
Sawa Sugimoto (杉本紗和, Sugimoto Sawa)
Voiced by: Sumire Uesaka (Japanese); Corey Pettit (English)
Being a huge Kouka fan, she enrolls at the Kouka School, skipping her chance to become a prima ballerina. She is the class representative of the Centennial Class.
Kaoru Hoshino (星野 薫, Hoshino Kaoru)
Voiced by: Yō Taichi (Japanese); AmaLee (English)
She is the daughter of a second-generation Kouka actress and is in the same class as Sarasa and Ai.
Ayako Yamada (山田 彩子, Yamada Ayako)
Voiced by: Rico Sasaki (Japanese); Megan Shipman (English)
Timid, shy, and plagued with problems concerning her weight, she almost quit the school due to the pressure; but, despite being underrated, she is one of the most talented performers in the Centennial Class.
Chika Sawada (沢田 千夏, Sawada Chika)
Voiced by: Risae Matsuda (Japanese); Monica Rial (English)
She is one half of the Sawada Twins. Inspired by a bunny lady twins they saw on a Kouka performance, she auditioned for the Kouka school with her twin sister, but delayed her admission when her other twin did not make it, which became a flashpoint in their relationship with each other.
Chiaki Sawada (沢田 千秋, Sawada Chiaki)
Voiced by: Satsumi Matsuda (Japanese); Natalie Rial (English)
She is the more chipper half of the Sawada Twins. Inspired by a bunny lady twins they saw on a Kouka performance, she auditioned for the Kouka school with her twin sister, but because she did not make it on the first try at auditioning for the school, her sister had to delay her admission, which became a flashpoint in their relationship with each other.
Sei Satomi (里美 星, Satomi Sei)
Voiced by: Hiroki Nanami
The top star of the Kouka Winter Troupe, (Note: The Winter Troupe is the Kageki Shojo!!'s in-universe counterpart of Takarazuka Revue's Snow Troupe (Takarazuka Revue's third oldest troupe).) who is friends with Ai and Sarasa. Her real name is Yasuko Yabe (Japanese: 矢部靖子, Hepburn: Yabe Yasuko).
Hijiri Nojima (野島 聖, Nojima Hijiri)
Voiced by: Kana Hanazawa (Japanese); Bryn Apprill (English)
One of the second-year students, and is Ai's student-advisor. She would sometimes bully Sarasa a bit, but she is, in her own way, dedicated to guiding Ai.
Risa Nakayama (中山 リサ, Nakayama Risa)
Voiced by: Mikako Komatsu (Japanese); Terri Doty (English)
The second-year student who is Sarasa's student-advisor. She would stand for her ward whenever Hijiri became a bit malicious with her.
Akemi Takei (竹井 朋美, Takei Akemi)
Voiced by: Yuka Terasaki
She is sometimes seen with Hijiri and Risa, as she is in the Second Year, and serves as the class representative of the 99th Class.
Mamoru Ando (安道 守, Ando Mamoru)
Voiced by: Junichi Suwabe (Japanese); River Kanoff (English)
He is known to Kouka school alumni and theater fans as "The Phantom" for his portrayal in The Phantom of the Opera. He is currently retired from acting after an accident during a performance, and is now an instructor at the Kouka School.
Taichi Narata (奈良田 太一, Narata Taichi)
Voiced by: Kenji Nojima (Japanese); Aaron Campbell (English)
Ai's uncle and the only male she trusts. He is an instructor at the Kouka School.
Akiya Shirakawa (白川 暁也, Shirakawa Akiya)
Voiced by: Kengo Takanashi
He is a kabuki actor who is the heir-apparent to the name of the 15th-generation kabuki actor Shirakawa Kaou (Shirakawa Kaou XV). He is also Sarasa's boyfriend, although they act like simple childhood friends. His real name is Hiroshi Atarashi (Japanese: 丁嵐宏, Hepburn: Atarashi Hiroshi).
Kōsaburō Shirakawa (白川煌三郎, Shirakawa Kōsaburō)
Voiced by: Takehito Koyasu
A kabuki actor and is married to the daughter of Shirakawa Kaou XV. Sarasa is rumoured to be his illegitimate daughter, but in actuality, she is the illegitimate sister of his wife, making her his sister-in-law. His real name is Masakazu Shimizu (Japanese: 清水真和, Hepburn: Shimizu Masakazu).
Shirakawa Kaou XV (十五代目 白川歌鷗, Jūgodaime Shirakawa Kaō)
Voiced by: Mugihito (Japanese); Frank Todaro (English)
A legendary Kabuki actor, he is the head of the Misatoya Acting House (a prestigious Kabuki acting house) and a Living National Treasure. He is a renowned tachiyaku, specializing in the aragoto style and whose best role is Soga Gorō/Sukeroku in Sukeroku. He is also Kōsaburō Shirakawa's father-in-law and Sarasa Watanabe's father, making Sarasa his secret illegitimate daughter. His real name is Hideo Atarashi (Japanese: 丁嵐英雄, Hepburn: Atarashi Hideo).
Captain Anai (穴井 一尉, Anai Ichii)
Voiced by: Norio Wakamoto (Japanese); Ben Phillips (English)
The School's drill sergeant.

== Media ==
=== Manga ===
Kageki Shojo! is written and illustrated by Kumiko Saiki. It was serialized in Shueisha's Jump X magazine from May 10, 2012, until the magazine ceased its publication on October 10, 2014. Shueisha collected its chapters in two tankōbon volumes, released on May 10, 2013, and October 17, 2014. Hakusensha later re-released the series as an omnibus volume, with the title Kageki Shojo!! Season Zero, on March 5, 2019. The re-release has been licensed in North America by Seven Seas Entertainment, who released it under the title Kageki Shojo!! The Curtain Rises.

A sequel series, titled ''Kageki Shojo!!'', began serialization in Hakusensha's Melody magazine on February 28, 2015. The series has been collected in sixteen tankōbon volumes. In September 2025, Saiki announced, via Twitter, that the series had entered its final arc and would end with the seventeenth volume. The sequel series has also been licensed by Seven Seas Entertainment in North America.

==== Volume list ====
===== Kageki Shojo! =====
No.	Original release date	Original ISBN	English release date	English ISBN
1	May 10, 2013	978-4-088-79574-4	November 24, 2020	978-1-64505-835-9
2	October 17, 2014	978-4-088-79896-7	November 24, 2020	978-1-64505-835-9

===== Kageki Shojo!! =====
No.	Original release date	Original ISBN	English release date	English ISBN
1	November 5, 2015	978-4-592-21726-8	July 6, 2021	978-1-64827-585-2
2	September 5, 2016	978-4-592-21727-5	October 5, 2021	978-1-64827-616-3
3	December 5, 2016	978-4-592-21728-2	December 14, 2021	978-1-64827-634-7
4	July 5, 2017	978-4-592-21729-9	February 15, 2022	978-1-63858-120-8
5	March 5, 2018	978-4-592-21730-5	April 19, 2022	978-1-63858-188-8
6	September 5, 2018	978-4-592-21866-1	June 21, 2022	978-1-63858-306-6
7	March 5, 2019	978-4-592-21867-8	December 20, 2022	978-1-63858-604-3
8	October 4, 2019	978-4-592-21868-5	February 28, 2023	978-1-63858-714-9
9	March 5, 2020	978-4-592-21869-2	June 13, 2023	978-1-63858-834-4
10	November 5, 2020	978-4-592-21870-8	October 17, 2023	978-1-63858-975-4
11	July 5, 2021	978-4-592-22831-8	October 22, 2024	978-1-68579-514-6
12	April 5, 2022	978-4-592-22832-5	January 7, 2025	979-8-88843-643-1
13	January 4, 2023	978-4-592-22833-2	March 25, 2025	979-8-89160-183-3
14	October 5, 2023	978-4-592-22834-9	June 10, 2025	979-8-89160-996-9
15	September 5, 2024	978-4-592-22835-6	December 23, 2025	979-8-89373-944-2
16	September 5, 2025	978-4-592-23088-5	September 15, 2026	979-8-89765-341-6
17	October 5, 2026	978-4-592-23152-3	-	—

=== Anime ===
An anime television series adaptation, also titled ''Kageki Shojo!!'', was announced in the December issue of Melody magazine on October 28, 2020. The series is animated by Pine Jam and directed by Kazuhiro Yoneda, with Tadashi Morishita handling the series' composition, Takahiro Kishida designing the characters, and Tsuneyoshi Saito composing the series' music. It aired from July 4 to September 26, 2021, on AT-X and other channels. The opening theme song "Hoshi no Orchestra" (Starry Orchestra) is performed by the three-member band saji, while the ending theme song "Hoshi no Tabibito" (Stellar Traveler) is performed by Sayaka Senbongi and Yumiri Hanamori. Funimation licensed the series.

==== Episode list ====
No.	Title	Directed by (Note: Information is taken from the ending credits of each episode.)	Written by	Storyboarded by	Original release date
1	"Beneath the Cherry Tree, in a Rain of Petals"; Transliteration: "Sakura Mai Chiru Konoshita de" (Japanese: 桜舞い散る木の下で)	Takashi Andō	Tadashi Morishita	Hiroyuki Morita	July 4, 2021
Ai Narata, a former member of an idol group called "JPX48," applies and gets accepted into the prestigious Kouka School of Musical and Theatrical Arts (whose annual admission is no bigger than 40) to become a stage actress. She tried to travel incognito in order to get to the school without drawing attention, although her cover gets blown. Her fame (and associated controversy that caused her "early graduation") preceded her upon reaching the school, making her an outcast from the get-go. And just as she is attracted to the "cursed" sakura tree within the campus, a tall girl reached out for her ticket that got blown into one of the tree's branches, then asked her if she could take a picture of her under the same tree. But Sarasa Watanabe, the tall girl, earned some stares from the people gathered at the courtyard--which includes the daughter of a family of stage actors and one who passed on becoming a prima ballerina in favor of enrolling at the school--when she declared her intent to become the "top star" someday.
2	"Those Who Long to Cross the Silver Bridge"; Transliteration: "Ginkyō o Mezasu Mono" (Japanese: 銀橋を目指す者)	Kazuma Ogasawara	Tadashi Morishita	Masaki Kitamura	July 11, 2021
It's the first day of class, where the freshmen are introduced to their second-year student advisors, and when the students try to stand out. The freshmen also gets to visit the backstage of the Kouka Theater. While on tour, Sarasa chanced upon a door left ajar. Andou-sensei, the instructor who accompanied them, tells her not to enter, but it was too late. Sarasa entered a door that actually leads directly to the stage area. As she wanders onto the stage, Ai is dazzled by Sarasa's stage presence, especially when the lighting crew, mistaking her for a staff member, pops a spotlight on her. Meanwhile, as all this is happening, Ai's stalker has arrived at Kobe.
3	"The Teddy Bear"; Transliteration: "Kuma no Nuigurumi" (Japanese: クマのぬいぐるみ)	Shūhei Kawachi	Miyako Matsumoto	Hiroyuki Morita	July 18, 2021
This episode reveals Ai's past and the lies she had to put up with, including the teddy bear her mother, an actress, says it's from her father (but he is not around). The episode also gets to the root of her hatred for men, namely sexual harassment from her mother's boyfriend at a young age, which scarred her junior high school years. Her joining JPX48 is supposed to have been a means to escape men, but it is proven otherwise. Meanwhile, her stalker has arrived at the Hanamichi Way--meaning he's close to Ai's location.
4	"Tears Overwritten"; Transliteration: "Namida no Uwagaki" (Japanese: 涙の上書き)	Hitomi Ezoe	Miyako Matsumoto	Hiroyuki Morita	July 25, 2021
Ai gets a panic attack and flees the scene, leaving Sarasa alone with the "stalker," Mikiya Kitaouji. But, getting tired of handing Ai's bag to Sarasa, Mikiya crumples down and sobs. He says that he's not there to harass her, but to apologize, claiming responsibility for Ai's expulsion from JPX. Taichi-sensei popped out of nowhere and heard the "stalker's" story. He tells them that Ai is the reason why he got out of his NEET lifestyle. He held on to Ai's hand a bit longer during a meet-and-greet event, causing her to call him a creep, which really hurt him. He hears that Ai was forced to graduate without much fanfare (read as "kicked out") as a result of what happened some time later. Taichi clarified a few things: first, Ai doesn't hate Mikiya in particular; and, second, she wasn't attached to JPX at all. Meanwhile, feeling guilty leaving Sarasa alone with the "stalker," Ai goes looking for her. Upon finding them in the same spot, her worries get replaced by hatred when she sees them dancing together. Ai get into a spat with Sarasa the next night, and skipped class the next day. Sarasa is confronted on that same day by her upperclassmen about a photo (taken by Hijiri chancing upon them) of her with a guy circulating on social media, given the strictness of their school rules. Denying that he is her boyfriend and mentioning that Taichi-sensei was with them, she rushes out, finally knowing where she is. She is able to locate her exact location with information from Mikiya, that she could be near the ocean, as usual when sad, and that means she could be near the harbor. And they got to her just in time as they see two men harassing her. Mikiya came to make the save. Taichi and Sarasa arrived later, and she screamed the loudest scream she could manage, calling the attention of two nearby cops, and scaring the harassers away. Ai went to where Mikiya was, thanking him and apologizing. He leaves with a little souvenir from Ai, saying he will be waiting to see her on the Kouka stage one day. On the way to the dorm, Ai asks Sarasa how she could forget something she can't. Because Sarasa's back is turned on her, she does not know her emotions at the time, but she hears from her that all she would do is cover them with more good memories. As they faced double the amount of morning cleaning from their upperclassmen, Ayako Yamada's "dieting" gets closer to going out of control.
5	"The Chosen Maidens"; Transliteration: "Erabareshi Otome" (Japanese: 選ばれし乙女)	Takashi Andō	Tadashi Morishita	Hiroyuki Morita	August 1, 2021
Ai tries to make up with Sarasa, but seemingly the latter ignores her. They later get to watch a Winter Troupe performance of Romeo and Juliet at the Kouka Theater, where Ai is noticed by the companion of one of the Kouka actresses passing by. After the play, Sarasa seems to have displayed that she could memorize lines just by hearing them once, when she uttered a few of Romeo's lines exactly as shown in the play, surprising her friends and upperclassmen, who thought all she knew was Rose of Versailles. This moved Ai, and, without noticing it, she grabs Sarasa's hand, eventually making up with her. Meanwhile, Ayako's binge eating and vomiting is catching up to her stamina. Onodera-sensei confronts and reprimands Tachibana-sensei, who also notices Ayako's condition, for calling Ayako "a fatty," which caused Ayako's eating disorder. Onodera-sensei takes her to the hospital when Ayako collapsed during one of his voice classes. Ayako is on the verge of quitting the school and her dream, but a little pep talk by Onodera-sensei seemingly puts her back on track because he recognizes her talents, notably her voice. Ayako returns to class after a few days of rest and stuns her classmates when she rendered an amazing solo. Ayako later apologizes to Ai, who noted her condition one night, for snapping at her. The events bolsters Ai to even work harder to become a Kouka actress.
6	"A Glimpse of Stardom"; Transliteration: "Sutā no Henrin" (Japanese: スターの片鱗)	Megumi Soga	Tadashi Morishita	Masaki Kitamura	August 8, 2021
For a change of pace, the class did trial acting, and the play in question is Romeo and Juliet. The class are divided into groups of four, and has two weeks to come up with a performance. Ai bucked her problem with reading kanji, and escaped Andou-sensei's thorough critique with little damage, as she was the first "non-smiling" Juliet he's ever seen. Chika Sawada may have flubbed her lines but managed to recover, and Kaoru Hoshino is told not to let her mind stray and act as she likes for now. Despite her good impression of Tybalt, Andou-sensei tells Sarasa that she won't become a top star if she does not change. Just as she turned 16.
7	"The Hanamichi and the Silver Bridge"; Transliteration: "Hanamichi to Ginkyō" (Japanese: 花道と銀橋)	Naotaka Hayashi	Tadashi Morishita	Hiroyuki Morita	August 15, 2021
Sarasa keeps on thinking about Andou-sensei's critique as she and Ai heads home for summer break. The reason for Andou-sensei's thoughts is because "he saw someone else's Tybalt instead of her own Tybalt." This owes to her roots as someone who started in kabuki, where it mostly relies on replication to keep it alive. Akiya Shirakawa, Sarasa's boyfriend, said, though, that kabuki is not all outright replication, as kabuki actors are always trying new things while maintaining old traditions, with entertaining audiences as the result. And to fulfill those expectations, actors should have dedication to it. As Akiya gave her and Ai tickets to a performance of Sukeroku, he says that he wants to show her his dedication to the craft. That night, Sarasa described to Ai her experience as a kabuki actor. Sarasa shed tears as they watched Akiya perform at the kabuki play, recalling her imitation of Sukeroku in front of her late grandmother. As Sarasa and Ai returns to their dormitory, Akiya told her to never lose sight of her goal, as "there's only one path to follow." This episode also reveals Sarasa's past--her being Kozaburou's rumoured illegitimate daughter, as he is married to the daughter of Kaou Shirakawa, a 15th-generation kabuki actor considered to be a national treasure, and whom Sarasa calls "Daidai-sensei." Akiya is also born into the kabuki family and is poised to become Kaou's heir to his name. Sarasa herself exhibited talent for kabuki, even, unexpectedly, starring in one performance of Sukeroku. She was perceived as a threat to Akiya's path to becoming Kaou's heir, that her kabuki instructor said outright that she would never do the kabuki play. Even with a regretful Kouzaburou, her angered grandfather prevented her from going back to their place to cut her off from kabuki as a result. The Shirakawas were also banned from attending the funeral of her grandmother.
8	"Kaoru's Summer"; Transliteration: "Kaoru no Natsu" (Japanese: 薫の夏)	Hitomi Ezoe	Miyako Matsumoto	Takao Abo	August 22, 2021
The episode focuses on Kaoru Hoshino's summer before getting accepted to Kouka School. Everyone at school considered her weird for using an umbrella (to keep herself from getting a tan) when most high school girls don't. She also was under pressure because she is being compared to her grandmother and mother, both former Kouka actresses. But because of this pressure, she got to know a high school boy named Rikuto Tsuji, the brother of a famous baseball player. Them being alike in situation led them to hanging out together, even to the point of becoming a couple, but broke up after a clash of beliefs--Rikuto, doubting his chances of success with his team, thought his getting into baseball was because of the pressure to be like his brother; and Kaoru, on the other hand, wanted to be like her grandmother and mother. She left the fireworks display they attended in tears, tinged with her envy of a normal teenager that she's been shrugging off for the sake of her ambition. She blocked him on her phone later, and never went back to that bus stop where they usually hang out. Rikuto's baseball team was in the running for the Koushien, and rose from being a benchwarmer to an actual starting player during his days with Kaoru. She was happy when she saw Rikuto hit that home run that sent his team to the Koushien. She knew later that they were eliminated early in the tournament. Fast forward to the start of second semester at Kouka School, Sarasa shows Kaoru an image of a bus stop on her phone. Kaoru notices that it is the actual bus stop where she and Rikuto first met. It had a note taped to its wall--from Rikuto, thanking her. He is still playing baseball when he posted the note. Smiling quietly, Kaoru agrees with Sarasa that it's romantic, promising herself that when she finally gets to walk across the silver bridge and he still plays baseball, she would reserve him a prime seat at the SS section of the theater...and probably even confess her feelings for him.
9	"The Two Juliets"; Transliteration: "Futari no Jurietto" (Japanese: ふたりのジュリエット)	Megumi Soga	Shin'ichi Inozume	Masaki Kitamura	August 29, 2021
Rehearsals are under way for the Grand Kouka School Festival, where the Superiors (alumnus of the Kouka School) team up with the students. And this means even the top actresses of the Kouka Troupe are around. At one time Sarasa and some of the First Years accidentally stumbled into a room with all of the top stars of the four troupes in it. The first years are also amazed by the down-to-earth attitude of the Superiors and felt at ease. Later, Mirei Nohara, one of the superiors, got to know Chiaki. Then when she called to Chika (mistaking her for her twin sister Chiaki), the latter ignores her. Chiaki gets scolded the next day, but Sarasa clarified things that Chiaki has a twin sister. No penalties are slapped on them, as insulting the Superiors is bad for anyone starting their Kouka ambitions; but Chiaki noticed that she is being ignored by their Superiors. This caused the twins to have a fight, which even caused Chika to bring about her delaying her admission into Kouka school because her sister failed the first time. Akiha Ichijou, one of the Superiors, later apologize to Sarasa for getting caught into the mistake, even praising her for standing up for her friends, saying it's the embodiment of the Kouka spirit. Later, Chika goes to apologize to Mirei, saying her jealousy on her sister caused her to not say a thing in the first place. Mirei urged her not to let negativity take control of her, and to turn that jealousy into ambition. Chika and Chiaki made up that night, but they are now aware that they cannot be exactly the same anymore--their journey through Kouka School reached the crossroads prematurely; but, one day, "their paths will come together again." That incident actually forged a friendship between the twins and Mirei--actually, she and Akiha are members of the Board of Directors for the Kouka Troupe. The day of the sports festival draws near, when Shiina Reo, one of the team leaders, approaches Akiha about one of their members spraining her leg for the relay race. According to management, it was suggested that another Superior should take her place; but Akiha suggests that a member of the Centennial Class should substitute for her.
10	"A Once-in-a-Century Autumn"; Transliteration: "Hyaku-nen ni Ichido no Aki" (Japanese: 百年に一度の秋)	Kazuhiro Yoneda	Shin'ichi Inozume	Masaki Kitamura	September 5, 2021
Sarasa gets chosen to be the substitute for the Spring Troupe's relay race, under the leadership of its top star, Shiina. This earned Sarasa more envy, especially among the second-years; and became the target of Hijiri Nojima's bullying, which sent her nervous going into the Sports Festival event--it scared her so much that she didn't play the recorder at all during their presentation. It went to near out-of-control when Risa had to intervene and give her a pep talk. By sheer coincidence, Sei Satomi, the lead of the Winter Troupe, enters the scene and gave her a pep talk, too. She is also there to give Sarasa a bouquet of red roses, saying it's "from her fan of the red rose." For some reason, Kouzaburou managed to infiltrate the backstage and "shoved" the bouquet onto Sei, and left the area to the outside of the sports arena (with Akiya waiting). That, along with a few words from Ai--to be her ideal self, put her back to condition. As per Ai's words, she wore fake boobs because she's playing her ideal self during the relay race--Sarasa's "ideal self" being having an E-cup. She trips when Sei fumbles in receiving the baton and crashed into Sarasa. They come in third and fourth, but the two cross the finish line hand-in-hand to hand their batons to the next runners. Sei indeed sees something special in Sarasa, agreeing with Andou-sensei. Meanwhile, Akiha reveals the reason why she chose Sarasa as the substitute runner--a sort-of thanks for standing for one of friends, and because of her fondness for the role of Lady Oscar, which she played ten years ago, without her knowing she had played the role. The Sports Festival, held every ten years, ended successfully.
11	"4/40"; Transliteration: "Yonjū Bun no Yon" (Japanese: 4/40)	Takashi Andō	Tadashi Morishita	Hiroyuki Morita	September 12, 2021
For the Kouka School Cultural Festival Show, the First Years are given a fifteen-minute slot on the show meant to be done by the Second Years, and with Romeo and Juliet being the play to be done. The problem: because of the limited time, only 4 out of the 40 freshmen are to be chosen to perform, and it is to be decided via audition. Sarasa, with urging from Ai and even Akiya, guns for the role of "Tybalt" again, as "revenge" for her previous slip-up. The competition among the freshmen turns intense (Sawa Sugimoto, who is Sarasa's rival for the role, goes into Beast Mode); and while it's somewhat easy for girls like Ai (given her experience advantage, as pointed out by her senior adviser Hijiri; but struggles to know the core feelings of "Juliet," her chosen character), the pressure is cracking for some of them, especially a timid Ayako.
12	"Surely Someone"; Transliteration: "Kitto Dare ka ga" (Japanese: きっと誰かが)	Naotaka Hayashi	Tadashi Morishita	Takao Abo	September 19, 2021
Remembering her past--that of her failed first love (she was technically "friend-zoned" by the one she has a crush with), and after Sawa urged her to "give it her all," Ayako comes out of her being timid and shy to render a stunning performance for the role of "Juliet." It is so incredible that Ai considered her as a worthy rival for the role, and made Onodera-sensei, her most ardent supporter, proud. Ai, Sawa, the Sawada twins, and Kaoru had their audition done, with Sawa, giving her all and making use of some of her ballet skills, doing one convincing portrayal of Tybalt, psyching herself with Sarasa in mind. Meanwhile, while Sarasa gets ready and awaits her turn, she remembers the events before she left for Kouka School, namely when she accepted Akiya as her boyfriend. But when her turn on the audition is at hand, there is a twist: Andou-sensei--"The Phantom"--takes the role of "Romeo."
13	"Kageki Shojo!!"; Transliteration: "Kageki Shōjo!!" (Japanese: かげきしょうじょ!!)	Hitomi Ezoe	Tadashi Morishita	Kazuhiro Yoneda	September 26, 2021
A bit flustered with Andou-sensei's all-stops-off performance (which worried Ai and the gang), Sarasa draws a bit of wisdom from what Daidai-sensei told her about execution of voice. As a result, she is able to perform a "Tybalt" that stunned the judges. The results came in, and Sarasa got the part of "Tybalt." To the surprise of everyone, Ayako gets the role of "Juliet," though that fact was met with doubt from some of her classmates. Kaoru, who failed to get the "Romeo" role, defends Ayako, saying she deserves the role. A frustrated Ai did not get the role of "Juliet" because her "Juliet" is too mature (as "Juliet" is supposed to be an innocent 14-year-old girl). Sawa, who narrowly lost to Sarasa, admits to Andou-sensei that, by comparing herself to Antonio Salieri from the Broadway musical "Amadeus," she cannot surpass "unprecedented prodigies" like Sarasa with what she has displayed in spite of her skill and praise for her; but is shocked to know from Ohgi-sensei the reason why she awarded her tiebreaker vote to Sarasa: her "fangirl" potential, as Ohgi-sensei is a hardcore Kouka fan. She is later consoled by Tomomi, her second-year counterpart, while hiding the fan mail she got. The episode ends with the Centennial Class doing a photo shoot for the poster declaring the opening of admissions for the 101st Class.

=== Stage play ===
A stage play adaptation was announced on June 23, 2023. It ran in Tokyo from October 18–22, 2023.

== Reception ==
The School Library Journal listed the first volume of ''Kageki Shojo!!'' as one of the top 10 manga of 2021.
