= Drugstore in Another World =

Japanese light novel series

- Drugstore in Another World: The Slow Life of a Cheat Pharmacist
- First light novel volume cover (Brave Novel edition)

チート薬師のスローライフ ～異世界に作ろうドラッグストア～ (Chīto Kusushi no Surō Raifu: Isekai ni Tsukurō Doraggusutoa)
- Genre: Fantasy, isekai, slice of life
- Novel series
- Written by: Kennoji
- Published by: Shōsetsuka ni Narō
- Original run: 2016 – 2020
- Light novel
- Written by: Kennoji
- Illustrated by: Shōji Nigō (Red Rising Books); Matsuuni (Brave Novel)
- Published by: Linda Publishers (2017); Hifumi Shobō (2018–2023)
- English publisher: NA: Seven Seas Entertainment (Brave Novel edition)
- Imprint: Red Rising Books (2017); Brave Novel (2018–2023)
- Original run: February 23, 2017 – January 25, 2023
- Volumes: 2 (Red Rising Books); 8 (Brave Novel)
- Manga
- Written by: Kennoji
- Illustrated by: Eri Haruno
- Published by: Takeshobo
- English publisher: NA: Seven Seas Entertainment
- Magazine: Web Comic Gamma Plus
- Original run: December 2018 – present
- Volumes: 14
- Anime television series
- Directed by: Masafumi Satō
- Written by: Hiroko Kanasugi
- Music by: Tomoki Kikuya
- Studio: EMT Squared
- Licensed by: Crunchyroll (streaming); SA/SEA: Muse Communication
- Original network: Tokyo MX, BS11, AT-X
- Original run: July 7, 2021 – September 22, 2021
- Episodes: 12
- icon

Drugstore in Another World: The Slow Life of a Cheat Pharmacist (Note: Japanese: チート薬師のスローライフ ～異世界に作ろうドラッグストア～, Hepburn: Chīto Kusushi no Surō Raifu: Isekai ni Tsukurō Doraggusutoa) is a Japanese light novel series written by Kennoji. It was serialized online between 2016 and 2020 on the user-generated novel publishing website Shōsetsuka ni Narō. It was acquired by Linda Publishers, who have originally published two volumes with illustrations by Shōji Nigō between February and June 2017 under their Red Rising Books imprint, before going bankrupt. Hifumi Shobō later reacquired the series, who have published eight volumes with illustrations by Matsuuni from April 2018 to January 2023 under their Brave Novel imprint. A manga adaptation with art by Eri Haruno has been serialized online via Takeshobo's Web Comic Gamma Plus website since December 2018. Both the light novel and manga are licensed in North America by Seven Seas Entertainment. An anime television series adaptation produced by EMT Squared aired from July to September 2021.

== Plot ==
Reiji Kirio, a former corporate wage slave, is suddenly transported to a fantasy world. Upon arrival, he discovers he possesses two skills, Appraise and Drug Discovery. They initially seem modest, but eventually prove extraordinarily useful, granting him unparalleled knowledge of medicine. Choosing to avoid combat and ambition, Reiji decides to pursue a peaceful livelihood by opening a small drugstore in a village, aiming to live a stress-free life, unlike the one he left behind.

He runs the shop with the help of Noela, a loyal canine girl, and Mina, a gentle ghost, treating a wide range of customers using his medicines and potions. His remedies address all kinds of ailments, drawing in elves, dragons, and other residents with unique needs. While Reiji's intention is a calm routine, his cheat-level abilities and growing reputation often lead to unexpectedly busy days.

== Characters ==
Reiji Kirio (桐尾礼治, Kirio Reiji)
Voiced by: Jun Fukushima
Previously a 24-year old office worker, he was transported to another world and becomes the manager of a drugstore to put his medicinal alchemist skills to use.
Noela (ノエラ, Noera)
Voiced by: Risae Matsuda
A child-like werewolf who lives with Reiji. She usually takes on a human form. She treats Reiji as her Master after he healed her, but her childish behaviour sometimes causes problems for Reiji.
Mina (ミナ, Mina)
Voiced by: Akane Kumada
The ghost who resides in the house where Kirio Drugstore is now open, haunting the house a century after her death, as she died young because of her sickness. She now can go out due to a brooch given to her. Her house was also seen with clothing materials in the cellar, revealing that her mother used to sew clothes when they were alive.
Elaine (エレイン, Erein)
Voiced by: Satsumi Matsuda
Daughter of the town Lord and Lady Flam. She has a superiority complex and an interest in Reiji. Called Makimaki (Twirls) by Noela.
Annabel (アナベル, Anaberu)
Voiced by: Mariko Higashiuchi
Leader of the Red Cat Brigade, a mercenary group that was hired by the town's governor to defend the town.
Gro Ejiru (ガロウ・エジル, Ejiru)
Voiced by: Fumiko Uchimura
The Demon Lord on the world Reiji transported to. Fell in love with Noela, who rejected his advances. Became a part-time drugstore employee to learn Reiji's craft.
Vivi (ビビ, Bibi)
Voiced by: Saori Ōnishi
A Spirit living in the lake where Mina loved to go when she was living. Easily melts when too hot, so she needs the cooling gel Reiji made. She became a part-timer in the drugstore.
Micott (ミコット, Mikotto)
Voiced by: Yukimi Hayase
Regular customer of the drugstore.
Zeral Alonzo (ジラル・アロンゾ, Jiraru Aronzo)
Voiced by: Taku Yashiro
One of the rich nobles of the town. Reiji helped him calm the nerves of his yandere girlfriend. He later gives a patch of his land for Reiji to plant his medicinal plants.
Feris (フェリス, Ferisu)
Voiced by: Sayumi Suzushiro
Zeral's girlfriend. A worrywart and a yandere, she usually snaps whenever Zeral had contact with women. Though now that she is getting medication, Feria has been mellow.
Kururu (クルル)
Voiced by: Reo Tatsumori
An Elf man. He was seen as events host. A definite homosexual, he has interest on Reiji. He's the elder brother of Ririka.
Ririka (リリカ)
Voiced by: Yuka Watari
Kururu's little sister. She approached Reiji to help her win an archery contest (due to bad stats of hers in archery) with a beast lure and short bow. She fell in love with Reiji.
Doz (ドズ, Dozu) and Moz (モズ, Mozu)
Doz Voiced by: Takahiro Kageyama
Moz Voiced by: Junichi Yanagida
Red Cat Brigade members. Both of them served the brigade under the Annabel's leadership.
Paula (ポーラ, Pōra)
Voiced by: Seika Hirose
The town's blacksmith. She goes to Reiji's drugstore both for his medicines and to occasionally eat there.
Belial (ビリアル, Beriaru)
Voiced by: Koji Fujiyoshi
The personal assistant to Ejiru. He goes off to find Ejiru after Ejiru got a part-time job at the drugstore.

== Media ==
=== Light novels ===
The series was written by Kennoji and serialized online between 2016 and 2020 on the user-generated novel publishing website Shōsetsuka ni Narō. It was later acquired by Linda Publishers, who have originally published two volumes with illustrations by Shōji Nigō between February and June 2017 under their Red Rising Books imprint, before going bankrupt. Hifumi Shobō later reacquired the series, who published eight volumes with illustrations by Matsuuni from April 2018 to January 2023 under their Brave Novel imprint. The Brave Novel edition of light novel series is licensed in North America by Seven Seas Entertainment.

==== Red Rising Books ====
No.	Japanese release date	Japanese ISBN
1	February 23, 2017	978-4-8030-1005-3
2	June 23, 2017	978-4-8030-1059-6

==== Brave Novel ====
No.	Original release date	Original ISBN	English release date	English ISBN
1	April 28, 2018	978-4-89199-492-1	May 11, 2021 (print); March 4, 2021 (digital)	978-1-64827-414-5
2	November 28, 2018	978-4-89199-534-8	August 10, 2021 (print); July 1, 2021 (digital)	978-1-64827-430-5
3	June 28, 2019	978-4-89199-567-6	November 23, 2021 (print); October 21, 2021 (digital)	978-1-64827-448-0
4	May 28, 2020	978-4-89199-628-4	January 18, 2022 (print); December 2, 2021 (digital)	978-1-64827-648-4
5	February 25, 2021	978-4-89199-688-8	May 3, 2022 (print); March 31, 2022 (digital)	978-1-63858-229-8
6	June 30, 2021	978-4-89199-718-2	December 13, 2022 (print); November 24, 2022 (digital)	978-1-63858-644-9
7	October 25, 2021	978-4-89199-760-1	September 2, 2025 (print); August 21, 2025 (digital)	978-1-63858-818-4
8	January 25, 2023	978-4-89199-925-4	December 30, 2025 (print); November 20, 2025 (digital)	979-8-88843-134-4

=== Manga ===
A manga adaptation with art by Eri Haruno has been serialized online via Takeshobo's Web Comic Gamma Plus website since December 2018 and has been collected in fourteen tankōbon volumes. The manga series is also licensed in North America by Seven Seas Entertainment.

No.	Original release date	Original ISBN	English release date	English ISBN
1	June 28, 2019	978-4-8019-6665-9	March 30, 2021	978-1-64827-070-3
2	January 28, 2020	978-4-8019-6839-4	June 22, 2021	978-1-64827-225-7
3	May 28, 2020	978-4-8019-6949-0	November 16, 2021	978-1-64827-475-6
4	November 26, 2020	978-4-8019-7136-3	March 1, 2022	978-1-63858-563-3
5	June 24, 2021	978-4-8019-7345-9	June 28, 2022	978-1-63858-317-2
6	September 24, 2021	978-4-8019-7430-2	January 10, 2023	978-1-63858-889-4
7	April 27, 2022	978-4-8019-7610-8	July 25, 2023	978-1-68579-685-3
8	November 7, 2022	978-4-8019-7887-4	December 26, 2023	979-8-88843-088-0
9	April 6, 2023	978-4-8019-8000-6	October 29, 2024	979-8-88843-812-1
10	November 7, 2023	978-4-8019-8193-5; 978-4-8019-8194-2 (SE)	April 22, 2025	979-8-89160-519-0
11	May 7, 2024	978-4-8019-8319-9	September 2, 2025	979-8-89373-616-8
12	November 7, 2024	978-4-8019-8490-5	March 31, 2026	979-8-89561-443-3
13	June 6, 2025	978-4-8019-8661-9	September 8, 2026	979-8-89765-563-2
14	February 6, 2026	978-4-8019-8875-0	March 16, 2027	979-8-89863-654-8

=== Anime ===
An anime adaptation was announced by Hifumi Shobō at Comiket 97 on December 28, 2019, later revealed to be a television series on May 25, 2020. The series is animated by EMT Squared and directed by Masafumi Satō, with Hiroko Kanasugi overseeing the series' scripts, Etsuko Sumimoto designing the characters, and Tomoki Kikuya composing the series' music. It aired from July 7 to September 22, 2021, on Tokyo MX, BS11, and AT-X. Akane Kumada performed the series' opening theme song "Kokoro Hayaru", while Jun Fukushima, Risae Matsuda, and Kumada performed the series' ending theme song "Mainichi Kashimashi Pharmacy". Crunchyroll streamed the series worldwide outside of Asia. Muse Communication licensed the series in South and Southeast Asia.

It was the first time for Risae and Satsumi Matsuda, who are twin sisters, to play main roles which are not related by blood.

==== Episode list ====
No.	Title	Directed by (Note: Information is taken from the ending credits of each episode.)	Written by	Storyboarded by	Original release date
1	"Today's Prescription: Part 1 Super (Energy) Potion"; Transliteration: "Honjitsu no Shohōsen Sono Ichi Mōretsu (Enajī) Pōshon" (Japanese: 本日の処方箋 その① 猛烈(エナジー)ポーション)	Masafumi Satō	Hiroko Kanasugi	Masafumi Satō	July 7, 2021
1	"Today's Prescription: Part 2 Landenflower Tea"; Transliteration: "Honjitsu no Shohōsen Sono Ni Randenfurawā Cha" (Japanese: 本日の処方箋 その② ランデンフラワー茶)	Masafumi Satō	Hiroko Kanasugi	Masafumi Satō	July 7, 2021
1	"Today's Prescription: Part 3 Botanical Deodorant"; Transliteration: "Honjitsu no Shohōsen Sono San Botanikaru Shōshū-eki" (Japanese: 本日の処方箋 その③ ボタニカル消臭液)	Masafumi Satō	Hiroko Kanasugi	Masafumi Satō	July 7, 2021
"Super (Energy) Potion": Reiji Kirio, a Japanese salaryman, is transported to a different world where he opens a drug store in Kalta village to make and sell potions with werewolf girl Noela as store mascot, and ghost girl Mina Fleuret as shop assistant and housekeeper. Reiji creates a potion that cures exhaustion and is delicious, compared to most potions which are foul. Alf, the proprietor of a General Store, asks to be able to distribute the potion in his store, spreading word about the potion so both stores can make huge profits. "Landenflower Tea": Reiji becomes involved in an argument between Zeral and his girlfriend Feris. Zeral explains Feris struggles to sleep and can be violently jealous, a borderline yandere and a worrywart. Reiji creates a medicinal drink called Landenflower Tea that reduces anxiety and aids sleep, since sleep deprivation causes mood swings. With Feris back to normal Zeral pays Reiji an exorbitant fee, revealing he is actually a rich, carefree noble. Reiji, a former downtrodden salaryman, becomes emotionally unstable at nobles throwing their money around, and the sweetness of the couple, forcing Mina to treat him with the tea as well. "Botanical Deodorant": Noela finds an Utsubo flower which creates a stink detectable only to monsters, so Reiji brews a potion from flowers to neutralize the stink, accidentally inventing deodorant which is hugely popular with his customers.
2	"Today's Prescription: Part 1 Dishwashing Detergent Scrubba-dub-dub"; Transliteration: "Honjitsu no Shohōsen Sono Ichi Shokkiyō Senzai Kyu Kyu Kyu no Kyu" (Japanese: 本日の処方箋 その① 食器用洗剤キュキュキュのキュッ)	Natsumi Higashida	Hiroko Kanasugi	En Kattō	July 14, 2021
2	"Today's Prescription: Part 2 Beast-Be-Gone"; Transliteration: "Honjitsu no Shohōsen Sono Ni Majū Konāi" (Japanese: 本日の処方箋 その② 魔獣コナーイ)	Natsumi Higashida	Hiroko Kanasugi	En Kattō	July 14, 2021
2	"Today's Prescription: Part 3 Capshin Fluid"; Transliteration: "Honjitsu no Shohōsen Sono San Kapushin-eki" (Japanese: 本日の処方箋 その③ カプシン液)	Natsumi Higashida	Hiroko Kanasugi	En Kattō	July 14, 2021
"Dishwashing Detergent Scrubba-dub-dub": Reiji creates detergent to make cleaning easier for Mina. Doz and Moz, Red Cat mercenaries who protect the town, beg Reiji to sell his energy potions for a discount as their Captain Annabelle requires five a day due to how hard she works. Reiji agrees to provide them for free if they help advertise his detergent to the townspeople. Annabelle agrees after seeing how easily the detergent washes dishes and also insists on collecting her potions herself. "Beast-Be-Gone": The forest begins running out of herbs so Reiji decides to grow them in fields loaned to him by Zeral, the Alonzo field. Unfortunately, pests have begun damaging crops so Reiji creates a beast repellent from the Utsubo flowers that repels the pests but is undetectable to humans. The repellant is an instant hit with farmers but Noela refuses to be around Reiji unless he has bathed first, due to her heightened sense of smell. "Capshin Fluid": Annabelle reveals bandits have appeared recently and she needs extra potions for her injured soldiers. Reiji creates a potion from alcohol and Capshin Peppers which, when sprayed in the bandits faces causes unbearable pain in the eyes and nose. Shortly later, the bandits leave the area forever. Elsewhere, Reiji's energy potion comes to the attention of someone powerful, the Demon Lord.
3	"Today's Prescription: Part 1 Beautiful Belle's Beautiful Skin Gel"; Transliteration: "Honjitsu no Shohōsen Sono Ichi Bihada Jeru Beppin-san" (Japanese: 本日の処方箋 その① 美肌ジェルべっぴんさん)	Hisashi Ishii	Hiroko Kanasugi	Hisashi Ishii	July 21, 2021
3	"Today's Prescription: Part 2 Charm Fragrance"; Transliteration: "Honjitsu no Shohōsen Sono Ni Chāmu Fureguransu" (Japanese: 本日の処方箋 その② チャームフレグランス)	Hisashi Ishii	Hiroko Kanasugi	Hisashi Ishii	July 21, 2021
3	"Today's Prescription: Part 3 Sweetheart Cooling Gel"; Transliteration: "Honjitsu no Shohōsen Sono San Reikyaku Jeru Hiyakkoi" (Japanese: 本日の処方箋 その③ 冷却ジェル 冷やっ恋)	Hisashi Ishii	Hiroko Kanasugi	Hisashi Ishii	July 21, 2021
"Beautiful Belle's Beautiful Skin Gel": Reiji is asked by Lady Flam to create a rejuvenating potion as she can no longer stand her husband's noble friends gossiping about how old she looks so Reiji creates moisturising face cream from fruits. With her skin looking much healthier Lady Flam is able to silence the bullying nobles so she sends Reiji expensive cookies in addition to his fee, causing Mina to think Lady Flam and Reiji are having an affair, thinking the gel as a gift to her. "Charm Fragrance": Elaine, Lady Flam's daughter, requests Reiji make a love potion to make Lord Lards, on whom she has a crush, fall in love with her. Reiji instead makes her a Charm Fragrance from flowers. Elaine, having become enamoured of Reiji's talent and frank manner of speaking, develops a crush on him and announces she will spend two days working at the shop where she surprisingly becomes friends with Noela, despite their disagreements and Elaine's superiority complex. "Sweetheart Cooling Gel": During hot weather Elaine's father, Lord Valgas, asks Reiji to create a potion that will bring winter. Despite his irritation at the assumption he uses magic instead of medicine, Reiji creates Sweetheart Cooling Gel which evaporates quickly and rapidly cools the body when applied to skin, though the girls use too much and begin freezing despite the hot weather.
4	"Today's Prescription: Part 1 Rokushou Sauce"; Transliteration: "Honjitsu no Shohōsen Sono Ichi Rokushō no Sōsu" (Japanese: 本日の処方箋 その① ロクショウのソース)	Seo Hye-Jin	Saeka Fujimoto	Seo Hye-Jin	July 28, 2021
4	"Today's Prescription: Part 2 Emotional Drive"; Transliteration: "Honjitsu no Shohōsen Sono Ni Emōshonaru Doraibu" (Japanese: 本日の処方箋 その② エモーショナル・ドライブ)	Seo Hye-Jin	Saeka Fujimoto	Seo Hye-Jin	July 28, 2021
"Rokushou Sauce":Reiji treats a sick squirrel, causing the squirrel to bring nuts to the store in gratitude. Reiji overhears waitress Rena and her father arguing with a noble named Fernando who wants to buy their tavern Rabbit Tavern to stop them competing with his restaurant. They realise the nuts are Rokushou nuts, a high quality ingredient that is difficult to find and to cook but results in a sauce suitable for royalty. Reiji uses his chemistry knowledge to recreate Rokushou Sauce according to the recipe. Fernando is furious the sauce is being served in a common tavern and demands Reiji sell him his entire stock, but Reiji refuses as he made the sauce for the tavern and Fernando is defeated. "Emotional Drive":Feris visits and explains she wants a baby with Zeral, but recently they have been having less sex so she wants an aphrodisiac to increase Zeral's desire. After speaking to Zeral and realising Zeral wants to marry Feris Reiji decides the aphrodisiac will probably be harmless, but Mina accidentally drinks it. While trying to evade Mina's erotic demands Reiji can't stop Noela giving the aphrodisiac to Annabelle. Reiji is able to give them both an antidote before anything drastic happens and eventually gives the aphrodisiac to Zeral, making Feris very happy.
5	"Today's Prescription: Part 1 Come Here Beast Lure"; Transliteration: "Honjitsu no Shohōsen Sono Ichi Yūinzai Majū Koi Koi" (Japanese: 本日の処方箋 その① 誘引剤魔獣コイコイ)	Masafumi Satō	Daisuke Watanabe	Tetsuya Yanagisawa	August 4, 2021
5	"Today's Prescription: Part 2 Mother's Brooch"; Transliteration: "Honjitsu no Shohōsen Sono Ni Okāsan no Burōchi" (Japanese: 本日の処方箋 その② お母さんのブローチ)	Masafumi Satō	Daisuke Watanabe	Tetsuya Yanagisawa	August 4, 2021
5	"Today's Prescription: Part 3 Stomach Acheless"; Transliteration: "Honjitsu no Shohōsen Sono San Hara Ita-yaku Hara Itaku Nain" (Japanese: 本日の処方箋 その③ 腹痛薬ハライタクナイン)	Masafumi Satō	Daisuke Watanabe	Tetsuya Yanagisawa	August 4, 2021
"Come Here Beast Lure":The Kalta hunting competition approaches. Ririka, an elf, wants to impress her brother Kururu who is the current champion, despite being a very poor archer. After giving her a potion to soothe her injured hands Reiji advises she use a short bow and brews a medicinal lure that attracts animals. Using this Ririka easily wins and beats Kururu's record with 86 kills, again 19 of her brother's. Deciding to thank Reiji she rushes to his store but becomes jealous when she sees Noela and Mina and realises she has fallen in love with Reiji. Kururu later on goes to the store and personally thanks him, but there is a catch. "Mother's Brooch":Mina is upset she cannot go outside and reappears in the living room if she tries. Reiji discovers a cellar under the living room with the help of the resident carpenter and finds a brooch that belonged to Mina's mother. They discover Mina is actually tied to the brooch, not the store, so by keeping the brooch in her pocket she can finally go outside. "Stomach Acheless":Noela gets a stomach ache eating nuts off the floor. Mina wonders if it has become habit to eat nuts since the squirrel keeps bringing them. Reiji brews medicine that makes food taste bitter so Noela stops eating food off the floor. Reiji later sells his medicine to shop owners to stop animals eating from their bins.
6	"Today's Prescription: Part 1 Stuck-In-Place Super Glue"; Transliteration: "Honjitsu no Shohōsen Sono Ichi Chōkyōryoku Setchakuzai Betopitan" (Japanese: 本日の処方箋 その① 超強力接着剤ベトピタン)	Yūji Endō	Nozomu Ōshima	Makoto Moriwaki	August 11, 2021
6	"Today's Prescription: Part 2 Glossy Shine Polish"; Transliteration: "Honjitsu no Shohōsen Sono Ni Kenma-eki Tsurukirapika" (Japanese: 本日の処方箋 その② 研磨液ツルキラピカ)	Yūji Endō	Nozomu Ōshima	Makoto Moriwaki	August 11, 2021
"Stuck-In-Place Super Glue":Noela breaks Mina's kitchen knife. Paula, the tool seller, is exhausted as she has hundreds of items to repair. Her latest project is Annabelle's broken gauntlets that resist all attempts at repair and she angrily wishes a liquid existed that could stick broken things together. Reiji invents Stuck-In-Place-Super-Glue which Paula uses to make repairs much faster. Unfortunately Noela gets glue on her hands and ends up stuck to Reiji. To avoid having to shower or sleep together Reiji invents Stuck-No-More-Releasing-Agent to melt the glue. Paula is able to go to bed on time and pays Reiji an exorbitant fee as thanks. "Glossy Shine Polish":Paula complains that adventurers never buy anything from her shop. Reiji reveals her shop is so dark even her highest quality weapons look like rusty antiques. After cleaning her shop Reiji notices all Paula's weapons and armour are dull and scratched, so he invents Glossy-Shine-Polish and Paula soon has all her merchandise gleaming and shiny. Unfortunately, adventurers do not often visit their village so she still doesn't manage to sell anything. Elsewhere, it is revealed Demon King Ejil has become addicted to Reiji's energy potion and when his servants are unable to bring him enough he decides to get more himself.
7	"Today's Prescription: Part 1 Woof? Advent of the Demon King!"; Transliteration: "Honjitsu no Shohōsen Sono Ichi Ru? Maō Kōrin!" (Japanese: 本日の処方箋 その① る？ 魔王降臨！)	Natsumi Higashida	Nozomu Ōshima	Natsumi Higashida	August 18, 2021
7	"Today's Prescription: Part 2 Give It to Me Straight"; Transliteration: "Honjitsu no Shohōsen Sono Ni Honne Sutorēto" (Japanese: 本日の処方箋 その② 本音ストレート)	Natsumi Higashida	Nozomu Ōshima	Natsumi Higashida	August 18, 2021
"Woof? Advent of the Demon King!":Ejil teleports to Reiji's store and is outraged when Reiji expects payment. Ejil becomes smitten with Noela and offers Reiji half the planet, once he conquers it, in exchange for Noela and one potion but Reiji refuses. Ejil flees but returns with money extorted from villagers by claiming himself the Demon King. Reiji correctly guesses the villagers actually thought he was homeless. Reiji gives him one potion which Ejil tries to give to Noela, but she again rejects him as Reiji already gives her one potion a day. Humiliated, Ejil demands Reiji make him his apprentice and refuses to leave so Reiji agrees he can work as a weekend shop assistant. "Give It to Me Straight":Ejil asks for a potion to read Noela's thoughts and discover how she really feels about him. Reiji agrees in exchange for Ejil not destroying anything if Noela doesn't like him. Reiji brews the potion Give-It-To-Me-Straight which broadcasts thoughts out loud. Ejil is disappointed Noela is totally indifferent about him, but remains determined to romance her. Mina accidentally drinks the potion, revealing her thoughts are dark and terrifying. Reiji decides never to sell the potion, afraid it would cause mass divorces throughout the country if drunk by married couples.
8	"Today's Prescription: Part 1 Odorless Body Soap!"; Transliteration: "Honjitsu no Shohōsen Sono Ichi Bodi Sōpu Musshu! (Mushū)" (Japanese: 本日の処方箋 その① ボディソープ・ムッシュ！（無臭）)	Kazuo Miyake	Hiroko Kanasugi	Kazuo Miyake	August 25, 2021
8	"Today's Prescription: Part 2 Three-Minute Revive"; Transliteration: "Honjitsu no Shohōsen Sono Ni Surī Minittsu Sosei-yaku" (Japanese: 本日の処方箋 その② ３min 蘇生薬)	Kazuo Miyake	Hiroko Kanasugi	Kazuo Miyake	August 25, 2021
"Odorless Body Soap!":Lord Valgas is convinced Elaine is avoiding him and Reiji suspects it is puberty. Elaine reveals she doesn't know why she dislikes her father. Reiji has a realisation and turns his deodorant into Odorless Body Soap for Valgas. After bathing and shaving his moustache Valgas attempts to speak to Elaine and eventually realises she does have a crush on Reiji and resented him for still treating her like a child. He promises to always support her and she forgives him. Valgas thanks Reiji but also reminds him he will never let Elaine marry him. "Three-Minute Revive":Mina develops a fever and reveals she was always falling ill while alive but never got to thank her mother for taking care of her. Reiji sends Ejil to collect magical potion ingredients while he and Noela fetch Mina's mother's diary. Reiji explains the potion can summon Mina's mother for three minutes. Mina uses the potion and summons the ghost of her mother's emotions, revealing she resented Mina's father for leaving her to care for Mina and was angry Mina was always sick but was sad when she died and regretted Mina never got to live a happy life. Mina is happy she got the chance to see her mother again and recovers from her fever.
9	"Today's Prescription: Part 1 Big Catch Buddy"; Transliteration: "Honjitsu no Shohōsen Sono Ichi Bakutsure-kun" (Japanese: 本日の処方箋 その① 爆釣れ君)	Natsumi Higashida	Saeka Fujimoto	Hiroki Shimazu	September 1, 2021
9	"Today's Prescription: Part 2 Harriette Remover"; Transliteration: "Honjitsu no Shohōsen Sono Ni Ke Torīnu" (Japanese: 本日の処方箋 その② 毛トリーヌ)	Natsumi Higashida	Saeka Fujimoto	Hiroki Shimazu	September 1, 2021
"Big Catch Buddy":Reiji takes everyone on a picnic to a lake but find it is no longer visited by humans as monsters now live nearby. Reiji uses his potion, Big Catch Buddy, to lure fish and catches Vivi, the spirit of the lake. She explains she took Reiji's bait because humans used to offer food at her shrine but since monsters appeared no one comes anymore and she is starving. As she can eat fish Reiji teaches her fishing and Vivi is surprised Reiji considers her a friend. To stop her being lonely Reiji offers her a part time job at his shop. She refuses as she must stay cold in her lake to hold her human shape, so Reiji uses his Sweetheart Cooling Gel to keep her cold and let her leave the lake. "Harriette Remover":Paula and Annabelle visit with a feminine problem. Reiji brews them Harriette Remover, a cream that dissolves unwanted hair. Unfortunately Noela plays with the cream and the tip of her tail becomes completely bald. As the cream also prevents new hair growing back Reiji is forced to brew Harriette Grower that returns her tail to normal. Noela finally learns her lesson about playing with new potions.
10	"Today's Prescription: Part 1 Power Potion"; Transliteration: "Honjitsu no Shohōsen Sono Ichi Pawā Pōshon" (Japanese: 本日の処方箋 その① パワーポーション)	Seo Hye-Jin	Daisuke Watanabe	Kurio Miyaura	September 8, 2021
10	"Today's Prescription: Part 2 RK Gene Fluid"; Transliteration: "Honjitsu no Shohōsen Sono Ni Āru Kei no Idenshi-eki" (Japanese: 本日の処方箋 その② ＲＫの遺伝子液)	Seo Hye-Jin	Daisuke Watanabe	Kurio Miyaura	September 8, 2021
"Power Potion":Vivi asks Reiji for a potion to make her stronger. A nearby Annabelle overhears and decides to put Vivi, Noela and Mina through soldier training with Noela even forcing Reiji to join in. As no one except Noela is fit enough to meet Annabelle's standards Reiji alters his original energy potion and creates “Power Potion” which aids muscle recovery after exercise, making building muscles more efficient. Unfortunately when drunk by Mina and Noela it instantly increases their muscle size and gives them professional bodybuilder personalities, but only for about an hour. "RK Gene Fluid":Ejil has made no progress romancing Noela and demands a potion to fix it. As no such potion exists Reiji wonders if he can at least help them get along as colleagues in the shop. Noela explains she has an instinctive dislike of Ejil's scent but likes Reiji's a lot so Reiji brews “RK Gene Fluid” based on his scent for Ejil to add to his food and alter his scent chemically. After a week Noela cannot tell between the scents of Reiji and Ejil and while they do start getting along better she still dislikes Ejil because of his perverted behaviour.
11	"Today's Prescription: Part 1 Pass, No Fail"; Transliteration: "Honjitsu no Shohōsen Sono Ichi U Kāru" (Japanese: 本日の処方箋 その① ウ・カール)	Atsushi Nigorikawa	Hiroko Kanasugi	Kurio Miyaura	September 15, 2021
11	"Today's Prescription: Part 2 Sun Sun Go Away Sunscreen Gel"; Transliteration: "Honjitsu no Shohōsen Sono Ni Hiyake Bōshi Jeru San San San" (Japanese: 本日の処方箋 その② 日焼け防止ジェルＳＵＮ散々)	Atsushi Nigorikawa	Hiroko Kanasugi	Kurio Miyaura	September 15, 2021
"Pass, No Fail":Reiji becomes annoyed everyone only visits at mealtimes knowing Mina will feed them for free. Paula stops visiting and begins studying to renew her merchant's license. Since she must close her shop if she fails she begs Reiji for a potion to make studying easier. Reiji agrees and brews a “Prayer for Success” potion to give Paula a perfect memory for 24 hours. A week later Paula learns she passed her exam and tries to kiss Reiji as thanks, but a jealous Noela stops her. With her success everyone returns to manipulating free food from Mina. "Sun Sun Go Away Sunscreen Gel":Vivi notices a skin blemish so Reiji decides to add sunscreen protection and moisturisers to the Sweetheart Cooling Gel, which Mina is sure would be popular with young ladies and would help with their food bill which has inexplicably become highly expensive. Reiji successfully makes “Sun Sun Go Away Sunscreen Gel” which protects against sunburn and makes the girls skin springy and bouncier which has a severe nosebleed effect on Ejil when he sees Noela's newly moisturised skin. Word spreads quickly and every female customer Reiji has ever had buys his entire supply.
12	"Today's Prescription: Let's Open a Drugstore in Another World!"; Transliteration: "Honjitsu no Shohōsen Isekai ni Tsukurō! Doraggu Sutoa" (Japanese: 本日の処方箋 異世界に作ろう！ドラッグストア)	Masafumi Satō	Hiroko Kanasugi	Masafumi Satō	September 22, 2021
"Let's Open a Drugstore in Another World!":Elaine invites everyone to a party. Reiji is uncomfortable as he never enjoyed parties with his co-workers in Japan. Doz is worried he cannot handle alcohol and doesn't want to embarrass himself. Reiji creates Liver Buddy EX to temporarily prevent drunkenness and hangovers. Mina finds her old party dresses are disintegrating, so Reiji brews Dress Cleaner to restore damaged fabric. Ejil's butler tries to locate Ejil. Reiji tries on his suit but the necktie reminds him of wearing ties to work. When the butler sees Reiji is capable of controlling Ejil he returns home. Reiji has a nap and dreams of how one moment he was a miserable salaryman, the next he woke up in the new world with the ability to create potions. He immediately treated an injured wolf who transformed into Noela. Waking, everyone travels to the party, except Ejil who missed the carriage. At the party Reiji realises his potions have made him popular among young noble ladies who compete for his attention. Zeral is caught flirting by Feris who tries to kill him. Ejil realises that due to being late the party gates are closed and he cannot get in. Reiji realises he actually enjoys parties while dancing with Noela and Mina.

== Reception ==
Anime News Network's review of the first novel gave it a score of 3/5 stars, stating: "There is a lovely straightforward quality to the writing and the story that lets us know that Kennoji isn't winking and nudging towards any deeper plan, but it really is, on the whole, kind of boring. But it's a pleasant boring, and there's definitely something to be said for that."

Rebecca Silverman of Anime News Network gave the first episode of the anime a score of 2/5 stars, criticizing it for omitting some details from the novel, but praised the visuals for Noela. She described the series as being "just okay, and mostly it reminds me that I wish it was Kennoji's other title, Hazure Skill, that got the anime series."

== See also ==
- The Girl I Saved on the Train Turned Out to Be My Childhood Friend, another light novel series written by Kennoji
- Hazure Skill, another light novel series written by Kennoji
- My Sword Saint Master Is Too Cute to Live With!, a manga series written by Kennoji
