= The Girl I Saved on the Train Turned Out to Be My Childhood Friend =

Japanese light novel series

- First light novel cover, featuring Hina Fushimi

痴漢されそうになっているS級美少女を助けたら隣の席の幼馴染だった (Chikan Sare-sō ni Natteiru S-kyū Bishōjo o Tasuketara Tonari no Seki no Osananajimidatta)
- Genre: Romantic comedy
- Novel series
- Written by: Kennoji
- Published by: Shōsetsuka ni Narō
- Original run: May 21, 2019 – December 15, 2020
- Light novel
- Written by: Kennoji
- Illustrated by: Fly
- Published by: SB Creative
- English publisher: NA: Yen Press
- Imprint: GA Bunko
- Original run: February 14, 2020 – May 15, 2023
- Volumes: 8
- Manga
- Written by: Kennoji
- Illustrated by: You Midorikawa
- Published by: Square Enix
- English publisher: NA: Yen Press
- Magazine: Manga Up!
- Original run: October 7, 2020 – May 14, 2024
- Volumes: 11
- icon

The Girl I Saved on the Train Turned Out to Be My Childhood Friend (Japanese: 痴漢されそうになっているS級美少女を助けたら隣の席の幼馴染だった, Hepburn: Chikan Sare-sō ni Natteiru S-kyū Bishōjo o Tasuketara Tonari no Seki no Osananajimidatta) is a Japanese light novel series written by Kennoji and illustrated by Fly. It was published on the user-generated novel publishing website Shōsetsuka ni Narō from May 2019 to December 2020. The first novel volume was released in print by SB Creative's GA Bunko imprint in February 2020. A manga adaptation, illustrated by You Midorikawa, was serialized in Square Enix's Manga Up! website from October 2020 to May 2024, with its chapters collected in eleven tankōbon volumes.

== Plot ==
Ryo Takamori, a quiet second-year high school student, breaks his ordinary routine one morning when he intervenes to stop a groper on a crowded train. The girl he helps turns out to be Hina Fushimi, his childhood friend whom he had grown distant since middle school as their social standings diverged, with Hina becoming the school's much adored beauty, and Ryo fading into the background. Though they now attend the same school, they have barely spoken in the years leading up to him saving her.

The rescue rekindles Hina's feelings and reminds her of the closeness they once shared, prompting her to seek out Ryo and rekindle their relationship. While Hina grows increasingly affectionate and hopeful that their renewed connection will turn romantic, Ryo remains largely oblivious to her feelings.

== Characters ==
Ryo Takamori (高森亮, Takamori Ryo)
Hina Fushimi (伏見ひな, Fushimi Hina)
Shizuka Torigoe (鳥越静香, Torigoe Shizuka)
Mana Takamori (高森茉菜, Takamori Mana)
Minami Shinohara (篠原美南, Shinohara Minami)
Ai Himejima (姫嶋藍, Himejima Ai)

== Media ==
=== Light novel ===
Written by Kennoji, The Girl I Saved on the Train Turned Out to Be My Childhood Friend started on the user-generated novel publishing website Shōsetsuka ni Narō on May 21, 2019, and the last chapter was published on December 15, 2020; the series was removed from the platform in late March 2021. The first novel volume, illustrated by Fly, was released by SB Creative's GA Bunko imprint on February 14, 2020, and the eighth and last volume was released on May 15, 2023.

The novel has been licensed for English release in North America by Yen Press.

No.	Original release date	Original ISBN	English release date	English ISBN
1	February 14, 2020	978-4-8156-0420-2	November 30, 2021	978-1-9753-3699-8
2	August 6, 2020	978-4-8156-0632-9	May 24, 2022	978-1-9753-3701-8
3	December 10, 2020	978-4-8156-0420-2	October 18, 2022	978-1-9753-3703-2
4	May 13, 2021	978-4-8156-0934-4	September 26, 2023	978-1-9753-6800-5
5	October 14, 2021	978-4-8156-1005-0; 978-4-8156-1031-9 (SE)	December 12, 2023	978-1-9753-7264-4
6	May 13, 2022	978-4-8156-1296-2	May 21, 2024	978-1-9753-7984-1
7	October 14, 2022	978-4-8156-1532-1	September 17, 2024	978-1-9753-7986-5
8	May 15, 2023	978-4-8156-1746-2	May 20, 2025	979-8-8554-0093-9

=== Manga ===
A manga adaptation, illustrated by You Midorikawa, was serialized on Square Enix's Manga Up! website from October 7, 2020, to May 14, 2024. Square Enix has collected its chapters in eleven tankōbon volumes, released from May 7, 2021, to June 7, 2024.

The series has been licensed for English release in North America by Yen Press.

No.	Original release date	Original ISBN	English release date	English ISBN
1	May 7, 2021	978-4-7575-7246-1	July 5, 2022	978-1-9753-4727-7
2	July 7, 2021	978-4-7575-7358-1	November 22, 2022	978-1-9753-4972-1
3	October 7, 2021	978-4-7575-7513-4	May 23, 2023	978-1-9753-6923-1
4	January 7, 2022	978-4-7575-7668-1	September 19, 2023	978-1-9753-7187-6
5	May 7, 2022	978-4-7575-7905-7	January 23, 2024	978-1-9753-7189-0
6	September 7, 2022	978-4-7575-8109-8	May 21, 2024	978-1-9753-7191-3
7	January 7, 2023	978-4-7575-8330-6	September 17, 2024	978-1-9753-9372-4
8	May 6, 2023	978-4-7575-8546-1	January 21, 2025	978-1-9753-9374-8
9	September 7, 2023	978-4-7575-8762-5	July 22, 2025	978-1-9753-9376-2
10	February 7, 2024	978-4-7575-9033-5	January 20, 2026	979-8-8554-1609-1
11	June 7, 2024	978-4-7575-9227-8	July 28, 2026	979-8-8554-1611-4

== See also ==
- Drugstore in Another World, another light novel series written by Kennoji
- Hazure Skill, another light novel series written by Kennoji
- My Sword Saint Master Is Too Cute to Live With!, a manga series written by Kennoji
- Bottom-tier Character Tomozaki, another light novel series illustrated by Fly
- Chasing After Aoi Koshiba, a manga series illustrated by Fly
- Iroduku: The World in Colors, an original anime television series with character designs by Fly
