= Stand My Heroes =

Japanese mobile game

スタンドマイヒーローズ (Sutando Mai Hīrōzu)
- Video game
- Developer: Coly
- Genre: Otome
- Platform: iOS, Android
- Released: September 5, 2016
- Anime television series

Stand My Heroes: Piece of Truth
- Directed by: Hideyo Yamamoto
- Written by: Sayaka Harada
- Music by: Fox Capture Plan
- Studio: M.S.C
- Licensed by: Crunchyroll
- Original network: Tokyo MX
- Original run: October 7, 2019 – December 23, 2019
- Episodes: 12
- Original video animation

Stand My Heroes: Warmth of Memories
- Directed by: Hitomi Ezoe
- Written by: Sayaka Harada
- Music by: Fox Capture Plan
- Studio: M.S.C
- Licensed by: Crunchyroll
- Released: May 24, 2023
- icon

Stand My Heroes (Japanese: スタンドマイヒーローズ, Hepburn: Sutando Mai Hīrōzu) is a Japanese mobile game. An anime television series adaptation aired from October 2019 to December 2019, and an original video animation was released in May 2023.

== Media ==
=== Video game ===
The mobile game was developed by Coly and released on iOS and Android on September 5, 2016.

=== Anime ===
An anime television series adaptation of the mobile game was announced in September 2018. It was produced by M.S.C and directed by Hideyo Yamamoto, with Sayaka Harada writing the scripts, Yuki Takayama designing the characters, and Fox Capture Plan composing the music. The cast from the original mobile game reprised their roles. The series premiered on October 7, 2019. Internationally, the series was licensed by Funimation outside of Asia. An English dub premiered one week after the original release of the first episode.

A new original video animation (OVA) was announced in May 2021. Titled Stand My Heroes: Warmth of Memories, it is directed by Hitomi Ezoe, with the main staff from the TV series returning. The OVA was released in Japan on May 24, 2023.

== Reception ==
The anime series' first episode garnered poor reviews from Anime News Network's staff during the Fall 2019 season previews. Rebecca Silverman felt it was a poor adaptation that makes Rei come across as a "useless otoge heroine" and its only major goal was to introduce the game's fan favorite characters, concluding that she will continue to watch it but with low expectations. Nick Creamer was critical of the thin narrative only propping up the similarly designed male cast to attract female viewers and the "fairly mediocre" animation being "largely functional", concluding that: "Ultimately, Stand My Heroes just feels like a reverse harem with extra steps - the police drama framework chafes awkwardly against the quasi-dating sim tone, making for an oddly stilted experience." James Beckett gave it credit for being an adult driven plot that's outside of the fantasy and sci-fi genres but criticized Rei for being a "limp and featureless" protagonist that's barely part of her own story and felt the male love interests carried "indistinguishable characterizing features", concluding that: "If you're looking for hard-boiled investigative drama this season, stick with something like Babylon. Only diehard genre fans will be able to get much out of this one." Theron Martin found the narrative to be "painfully contrived" by dating sim standards and the character of Rei to be a bland audience stand-in with unconvincing characteristics, concluding that: "Maybe this series might work for dedicated fans of otome games, but even on that judging standard I find it quite weak." Silverman reviewed the complete anime series in 2020 and gave it a C− rating. She criticized the adaptation for having "sloppy storytelling" and a "general lack of coherency" when combining various character routes and telling its overarching drug-crime plot, a bloated male cast with similar features and "lackluster production values", concluding that: "It isn't painful to watch, but that's almost too bad, because even if it had failed spectacularly, it would still have been more memorable than it ultimately is."
