= Failure Frame =

Japanese light novel series and its adaptations

- Failure Frame: I Became the Strongest and Annihilated Everything with Low-Level Spells
- First light novel volume cover, featuring Seras Ashrain

ハズレ枠の【状態異常スキル】で最強になった俺がすべてを蹂躙するまで (Hazure Waku no "Jōtai Ijō Sukiru" de Saikyō ni Natta Ore ga Subete o Jūrin Suru made)
- Genre: Dark fantasy; Isekai
- Novel series
- Written by: Kaoru Shinozaki
- Published by: Shōsetsuka ni Narō
- Original run: November 24, 2017 – present
- Light novel
- Written by: Kaoru Shinozaki
- Illustrated by: KWKM
- Published by: Overlap
- English publisher: NA: Seven Seas Entertainment
- Imprint: Overlap Bunko
- Original run: July 25, 2018 – present
- Volumes: 13 + 1 short story collection
- Manga
- Written by: Kaoru Shinozaki; Keyaki Uchi-Uchi (composition)
- Illustrated by: Shō Uyoshi
- Published by: Overlap
- English publisher: NA: Seven Seas Entertainment
- Magazine: Comic Gardo
- Original run: July 26, 2019 – present
- Volumes: 14
- Anime television series
- Directed by: Michio Fukuda
- Written by: Yasuhiro Nakanishi
- Music by: Tatsuhiko Saiki
- Studio: Seven Arcs (Note: Animation production assistance (アニメーション制作協力) for all episodes provided by SynergySP.)
- Licensed by: Crunchyroll (streaming); SA/SEA: Muse Communication
- Original network: TBS, IBC, GYT, BS11, AT-X
- Original run: July 5, 2024 – September 27, 2024
- Episodes: 12
- icon

Failure Frame: I Became the Strongest and Annihilated Everything with Low-Level Spells (Japanese: ハズレ枠の【状態異常スキル】で最強になった俺がすべてを蹂躙するまで, Hepburn: Hazure Waku no "Jōtai Ijō Sukiru" de Saikyō ni Natta Ore ga Subete o Jūrin Suru made; lit. "Until I Became the Strongest with the Failure Frame 'Status Abnormal Skill' and Overran Everything") is a Japanese light novel series written by Kaoru Shinozaki. The series originated on the Shōsetsuka ni Narō website in November 2017, before Overlap acquired and published it in print with illustrations by KWKM in July 2018. A manga adaptation with composition by Keyaki Uchi-Uchi and illustrations by Shō Uyoshi began serialization on the Comic Gardo website in July 2019. An anime television series adaptation produced by Seven Arcs aired from July to September 2024.

== Plot ==
Touka Mimori and his classmates are suddenly summoned to a fantasy world by a goddess to act as heroes. While most of them are shown to have exceptional skills, Mimori has an E-rank. Deeming him useless, the goddess decides to banish Mimori to a monster-filled dungeon where nobody has ever survived, a fate to which almost all of his classmates abandon him without hesitation. However, it turns out that his skills are more abnormal and powerful than they seem. After escaping from the dungeon and discovering the full truth behind the goddess' actions, Mimori vows to have his revenge. As he travels throughout this new world, strengthening and increasing his skills, he acquires friends and allies while making sure that the goddess and his former classmates continue to believe him dead.

== Characters ==
Touka Mimori (三森 灯河, Mimori Tōka)
Voiced by: Ryōta Suzuki (Japanese); Tom Aglio (English)
Known as Class 2C's background character, he is assigned as an E-rank by the Goddess Vicius and is banished into a dangerous dungeon where nobody has ever survived. After suffering countless physical and emotional abuse as a child from his own parents, who eventually abandoned him, he was rescued by his uncle and aunt; as a result, he developed two different personas: 1) being the good guy to those who treat him well, and 2) a dark and ruthless persona, annihilating those whom he deems deserving to die (especially those who have deliberately abused or killed the innocent and helpless). While his unique skills are deemed to be useless, they have proven to have a 100% success rate against his opponents (with the exception of Vicius, who is constantly protected by a barrier), which leads him to suspect that E-Rank is the highest rank of all, with the "E" standing for "Exceptional". His most used Skills are Paralyze, Poison and Sleep, to which he has leveled up to add Dark (which blinds the opponent), Berserk (which sends the person the Skill is used against into an uncontrollable rage) and Freeze (which completely encases the target in a block of ice), and he has learned to use lethal combinations of these Skills; a favorite strategy of his is to lure his opponent into a state of overconfidence and then fatally strike at the moment when the opponent believes they have won. In addition to his abilities, he is also the possessor of a book of powerful magic written by a Hero/Sage whom the Goddess had also disposed of and who had died in that dungeon (Mimori also now wears the Sage's robes). After learning of the legend of "The Lord of the Flies" and buying a helmet mask of that character, he adopts that identity and the character's name, "Belzegea", using the helmet mask to disguise himself with a magic stone inside it to disguise his voice and slowly creating his own "Lord of the Flies Brigade" band. While he receives no EXP from killing human opponents, he has racked up an impressive list of conquests, including the Soul Eater in the Ruins of Disposal, the White Walkers mercenary group, Civit Garland and the Black Dragon Riders, the Ashint assassin group, the Sixth Order of Alion Knights, Vicius' elite unit The Sword of Courage and golden-eyed monsters too numerous to count. Despite his acknowledgement of his own inner darkness, his companions trust him absolutely, and as the time of reckoning for Vicius draws near, he is finally able to admit his true feelings for Seras.
Seras Ashrain (セラス・アシュレイン, Serasu Ashurein)
Voiced by: Saki Miyashita (Japanese); Dani Chambers (English)
A princess from the High Elf country and former captain of the Holy Knights of the Kingdom of Neia, where she was Princess Cattlea's most trusted confidente. A highly skilled swordswoman, she is extremely beautiful, with blonde hair and a flawless complexion, and has a remarkable purity of soul/spirit (something which even other women easily admit and admire, and which makes her desired by many men). If she has any character flaws, it is that she wants to see the best in people, even if it puts her in great peril (a trait that Mimori recognizes, but admires and never scolds her for). After she was forced to flee Neia rather than be handed over to the Goddess Vicius, a bounty was placed on her and she hid her identity by disguising herself as a human. After a fateful encounter with Mimori, who saves her from bounty hunters and later from Civit Garland and the Black Dragon Riders, she decides to pledge her loyalty to him and follow his journey of revenge as his guard. When Mimori buys the "Lord of the Flies" mask, he also buys the helmet mask of "The Fly Swordsman" for Seras to hide her true identity. As their journey continues, her feelings towards him becomes stronger and more romantic, but she is determined to not let her feelings get in the way of his vengeance; however, as the final battles draws closer, she admits to Mimori that she loves him and even proposes marriage in Volume 11.5 of the light novels (which he accepts). In that same volume, it is revealed that she was banished from the High Elf country for defying Divine prohibitions (even though her disobedience resulted in the saving of lives), and that her leaving that realm caused her to lose most of her memory of that life. The only other person to whom she has shown such total devotion is the Princess (later Queen) Cattlea Straumms of Neah, who regards Seras as a beloved sister (and who has stated, after meeting "The Lord of the Flies" in person, her complete approval of a match between Seras and Tooka).
Piggymaru (ピギ丸, Pigimaru)
Voiced by: Ayami Tsukui (Japanese); Bryn Apprill (English)
A slime whom Mimori encounters in the forest while it is being overpowered by a group of other larger slimes. Impressed by its determination to fight back despite its disadvantage, Mimori decides to save it. It becomes attached to Mimori and decides to follow him, thus aiding him in his journey of revenge. Mimori later uses special potions to help Piggymaru "level up". Despite it being a Slime, it appears to be highly intelligent and extremely resilient in dangerous situations, able to bond with Mimori to produce a multi-enemy attack called "Assault Accel".
Vicius (ヴィシス, Vuishisu)
Voiced by: Ami Koshimizu (Japanese); Mikaela Krantz (English)
The Goddess who summons Class 2C to save the world from The Demon Lord and his army. Behind her physical beauty and radiant smile, she is actually heartless, cruel, ruthless and arrogant, rejecting and disposing of anyone whom she deems to be useless while adopting a public persona of caring. She is a master manipulator, using both lies and half-truths to advance her schemes; she has also used her manipulations to "brainwash" Oyamada into becoming her servant and Ayaka into believing that Mimori is the enemy. Mimori now targets her as the object of his revenge after he escapes from the Ruins of Disposal, to which she had condemned him, and although she publicly sneers at "The Lord of the Flies" she secretly fears him. In Volume 11 of the light novel series. she admits that she hates and despises humans and that her ultimate goals are to eliminate them all for her pleasure (something the other Divines will not tolerate, as they see humanity as their "children") and to utterly overthrow and destroy the other Divines.
Ayaka Sogou (十河綾香, Sogō Ayaka)
Voiced by: Karin Nanami (Japanese); Celeste Perez (English)
The class representative of Class 2C. When Mimori was banished to the Ruins of Disposal, she tried to speak up for him, but was viciously knocked unconscious by the goddess. Feeling guilty that she could not save Mimori, she resolves to protect her weaker classmates to ensure they do not suffer the same fate as Mimori, becoming the leader of one of the Hero groups. Trained enormously in martial arts during her childhood days, she is skilled in handling close combat weapons and is secretly trained in combat by Nyantan Kikeepat; however, in the anime she has yet to unlock her true Skill potential despite being an S-Rank Hero, causing her to be looked down upon by Kirihara, Oyamada and Yasu. In the light novels, the only person she feels she can really trust is Hijiri Takao, and the emotional and physical strain on her becomes so powerful that she is manipulated (almost brainwashed) by Vicius into believing that "The Lord of the Flies" is the enemy, and she is sent to kill him; in Volume 10 of the light novels, even when she learns who "The Lord of the Flies" really is, she still attacks him and only the arrival of Hijiri Takao makes her stop. In Volume 11 of the light novels, all the revelations of the truth cause her to suffer a mental and physical collapse, but she later recovers and joins with Mimori and Hijiri against Vicius.
Takuto Kirihara (桐原拓斗, Kirihara Takuto)
Voiced by: Masaaki Mizunaka (Japanese); Ian Sinclair (English)
A member of Class 2-C who is powerful enough to be deemed an S-Rank Hero. Due to his current power level and Skills, he becomes extremely arrogant and believes himself worthy of kingship in this new world. He is the leader of one of the Hero groups. His major Skill is Dragonic Buster, a powerful flame-throwing magic.
Shougo Oyamada (小山田翔吾, Oyamada Shōgo)
Voiced by: KENN (Japanese); Derick Snow (English)
A member of Class 2-C who is powerful enough to be deemed an A-Rank Hero. However, while also extremely powerful, he appears to be more violent, uncaring and emotionally unstable. He is a member of Kirihara's group, with Kirihara being the only one who can dominate him. In Volume 9 of the light novels, it is revealed that Oyamada used to be a member of a particularly vicious gang until its leader was murdered by an even stronger gang, and he then attached himself to Kirihara (perhaps for protection).
Kobato Kashima (鹿島小鳩, Kashima Kobato)
Voiced by: Maria Naganawa (Japanese); Nia Celeste (English)
A girl in Class 2-C whom Mimori had befriended back in their own world, but who was too afraid to defend him or speak up for him when he was "disposed of" (a betrayal she can never forgive herself for). A D-ranked Hero, she admits to being a coward and proves unable to kill monsters, reluctantly joining Asagi Ikusaba's group for survival, with Asagi nicknaming her "Pigeon" or simply "Pidgey". While she hates herself for her betrayal of Mimori and her cowardice, she remains with Asagi's group in hope that she might be able to warn Ayaka Sogou of any hostile move against her by Asagi. In Volume 8 of the light novels, it is revealed that her Major Skill is Disclose, an ability to see other Heroes' stats, which unexpectedly allows her to learn "The Lord of the Flies"' true identity.
Asagi Ikusaba (いくさばあさぎ, Ikusaba Asagi)
Voiced by: Emi Hirayama
A member of Class 2-C and B-Rank Hero who has become the leader of one of the Hero groups. While her manner is brash and extremely outspoken, she is able to inspire complete loyalty towards her from her group members and has not yet lost a single member in battle. Her style of battling monsters is to share the EXP among the members of her group; while in the anime it is not yet known what her Major Skill is, in the light novels she is able to use Queen Bee, which can both buff up her teammates' stats and also make a target/enemy's stats the same as her own (weakening the target/enemy enough for her group to finish it off). She seems to have taken the more timid Kashima under her wing, referring to her as "Pidgey", and using her as something almost approaching a confidente. Her motives in the anime are not quite clear (such as whether or not she ultimately wants to return to her own world), but she is definitely independent and does not trust the Goddess Vicius at all. In the light novels, Mimori and Hijiri conclude (and she confirms) that she sees this whole conflict as a game and is determined to stay on what she considers to be the winning side; her pragmatic side is revealed when she and her group desert Vicius and the Alion forces to join with the Wildly Beautiful Emperor of Mira and "The Lord of the Flies" (especially once she learns his true identity).
Tomohiro Yasu (安智弘, Yasu Tomohiro)
Voiced by: Daiki Yamashita (Japanese); Justin Briner (English)
A member of Class 2-C who is powerful enough to be deemed an A-Rank Hero. However, while also extremely powerful, he appears to suffer from an inferiority complex due to his treatment and lack of friends in his former world and therefore believes that others are looking down on him, causing him to lash out whenever he feels slighted or mocked. He is the leader of his own Hero group, but feels no responsibility towards his followers or seems to care whether they live or die as long as he survives. His Major Skill is Levatine, a "black fire" magic. In Volume 7 of the light novels, he is sent by Vicius on a supposed mission, accompanied by the Sixth Order of Alion Knights, but along the way is betrayed and viciously tortured by them (on Vicius' orders), and is only rescued by Mimori's total extermination of the Sixth Order. In Volume 8, while recovering from his injuries, he seems to have undergone a total emotional rehabilitation, realizing and admitting to all of his faults and mistakes, and later is allowed to leave to go on a solo journey to see the truth of this world for himself.
Hijiri Takao (高雄聖, Takao Hijiri)
Voiced by: Saori Hayami (Japanese); Abigail Blythe (English)
A member of Class 2-C and S-Class Hero, she refuses to join any of the Hero Groups, preferring to work only with her younger sister Itsuki. She proves to not only be skilled in fighting, but to also have a strong intellect and keen analytical mind, able to see facts and truths that others either can't or simply don't. She is the first to realize that the Goddess Vicius may be targeting her classmates for assassination and in Volume 8 of the light novels actually tries to assassinate Vicius, an attempt which fails and results in Hijiri being seriously poisoned; with the help of her sister she manages to escape and reach the home of the Forbidden Witch in the Land of Golden-Eyed Monsters, who cures her. After her recovery, she and Itsuki join up with Mimori and Seras, and she is able to stop Ayaka Sogou from attacking "The Lord of the Flies" when Ayaka believes he is about to kill one of her classmates.
Itsuki Takao (高雄樹, Takao Itsuki)
Voiced by: Kaori Maeda (Japanese); Kelly Greenshield (English)
Hijiri Takao's younger sister, also a member of Class 2-C and an A-Class Hero. While strong at fighting, she is also far more reckless and sometimes takes her older sister's instructions too literally, which can lead to misunderstood situations. She is more emotional and less intellectual than Hijiri, sometimes causing her to not understand what her sister is talking about.
Eve Speed (イヴ・スピード, Ivu Supīdo)
Voiced by: Hitomi Ueda (Japanese); Monica Rial (English)
An incredibly skilled leopard-woman warrior who had been captured and sold as a slave, only to become a champion in the city of Monroy's arena-fighting known as "Blood Fighting" or "Blood Sport" (similar to the gladiatorial battles in Rome's Colosseum), where slaves and mercenaries battle to eventually earn their freedom. Eve had been the undefeated Blood Fighting Champion for five years, hoping to also earn the freedom of Lisbeth (see below), but the Duke in charge of the Blood Fights planned to betray her and fix her final match so she would be killed (like all the Champions before her). Warned by Mimori of the plot and verifying it for herself, she agrees to let him help her rescue Lisbeth and joins him and Seras on their journey to find the Forbidden Witch in the Land of Golden-Eyed Monsters. After coming to trust Mimori and fighting side by side with him against the Duke's private army, she also vows loyalty to him. After the group reaches the home of the Forbidden Witch in the Land of Golden-Eyed Monsters, she and Lisbeth realize their dream of settling down together to a peaceful life after the Witch grants them sanctuary. In Volume 6 of the light novels, Mimori and Seras discover that Eve's clan had been ruthlessly slaughtered by the Sword of Courage (Vicius' unit of elite warriors) on the Goddess' orders, causing Mimori and Seras to ruthlessly exterminate them all.
Lisbeth (リズベット, Rizubetto)
Voiced by: Misaki Watada (Japanese); Jalitza Delgado (English)
A Dark Elf child who was also sold as a slave along with Eve. She doesn't seem to have a last name, and has a strong emotional bond with Eve, whom she calls her "Big Sister". Forced to work in a Monroy inn near the Blood Fighting Colosseum, she is both physically and emotionally abused by the landlady (similar to how Mimori was abused by his parents). Eve had been prolonging her Blood Fighting in the hope of also earning Lisbeth's freedom, but after learning of the Duke's betrayal and his lecherous plans for Lisbeth, she rescues Lisbeth, and the two join Mimori and Seras on their journey. After Mimori proclaims her a member of his "mercenary band", she gains confidence and insists on pulling her own weight. After the group reaches the home of the Forbidden Witch in the Land of Golden-Eyed Monsters, she and Eve realize their dream of settling down together to a peaceful life after the Witch grants them sanctuary, and by Volume 9 of the light novels she has become a sort of unofficial assistant to the Witch, helping her with cooking and with making potions and other magical items.
Nyantan Kikeepat (ニャンタン・キキーパット, Nyantan Kikīpatto)
Voiced by: Asuka Shioiri (Japanese); Bev Mageto (English)
A cat-woman who acts as a "disciple" of the Goddess Vicius, who in private treats her in "Domme"-fashion. She is a skilled warrior (able to take down Oyamada in an instant without even breaking a sweat), secretly training Ayaga in swordsmanship. She has four younger sisters, three of whom (Laiya, Silse and Nyono) were held hostage by Vicius; the fourth, Nyaki, is rescued from servitude (more like slavery) to the Sword of Courage by Mimori and Seras in Volume 6 of the light novels and joins them on their journey to the Country at the End of the World. All five sisters are reunited in Volume 11 of the light novels after Nyantan and her three sisters escape from Alion.
Civit Garland (シビト・ガートランド, Shibito Gātorando)
Voiced by: Junichi Suwabe (Japanese); Jim Foronda (English)
The leader of the Black Dragon Knights from the Bakuos Empire and referred to as "The Strongest Man in the World". His goal is to battle against and defeat the strongest opponents he can find, and his current mission is to capture Seras. Despite his incredible physical strength and martial skills, Mimori is able to catch him off guard and eliminate him, along with his entire squad. He and the Black Dragon Knights were considered the strongest force against the Demon Lord's army, and their destruction was considered a severe blow to the allied kingdoms.

== Media ==
=== Light novels ===
Written by Kaoru Shinozaki, the series began serialization on the novel posting website Shōsetsuka ni Narō on November 24, 2017. The series was later acquired by Overlap, who began publishing the series in print with illustrations by KWKM on July 25, 2018. As of April 2025, thirteen volumes and one short story volume have been released.

In July 2020, Seven Seas Entertainment announced that they had licensed the novels for English publication.

==== Volumes ====
No.	Original release date	Original ISBN	English release date	English ISBN
1	July 25, 2018	978-4-86554-372-8	December 10, 2020 (digital); March 9, 2021 (print)	978-1-64827-069-7
2	December 25, 2018	978-4-86554-426-8	May 13, 2021 (digital); June 8, 2021 (print)	978-1-64827-089-5
3	May 25, 2019	978-4-86554-494-7	November 11, 2021 (digital); December 21, 2021 (print)	978-1-64827-265-3
4	October 25, 2019	978-4-86554-559-3	June 2, 2022 (digital); August 2, 2022 (print)	978-1-64827-320-9
5	April 25, 2020	978-4-86554-645-3	August 25, 2022 (digital); October 11, 2022 (print)	978-1-63858-326-4
6	November 25, 2020	978-4-86554-782-5	November 3, 2022 (digital); February 21, 2023 (print)	978-1-63858-699-9
7	May 25, 2021	978-4-86554-909-6	March 2, 2023 (digital); June 13, 2023 (print)	978-1-63858-994-5
8	November 25, 2021	978-4-8240-0044-6	August 10, 2023 (digital); October 10, 2023 (print)	978-1-68579-853-6
9	June 25, 2022	978-4-8240-0186-3	December 28, 2023 (digital); February 20, 2024 (print)	979-8-88843-197-9
10	December 25, 2022	978-4-8240-0363-8	May 16, 2024 (digital); June 18, 2024 (print)	979-8-88843-591-5
11	June 25, 2023	978-4-8240-0527-4	September 12, 2024 (digital); October 15, 2024 (print)	979-8-89160-228-1
11.5	January 25, 2024	978-4-8240-0711-7	January 23, 2025 (digital); February 25, 2025 (print)	979-8-89160-877-1
12	July 25, 2024	978-4-8240-0854-1	June 12, 2025 (digital); July 29, 2025 (print)	979-8-89373-325-9
13	April 25, 2025	978-4-8240-1150-3	March 31, 2026 (print)	979-8-89561-673-4

=== Manga ===
A manga adaptation, with composition by Keyaki Uchi-Uchi and illustrations by Shō Uyoshi, began serialization on the Comic Gardo manga website on July 26, 2019. As of June 2026, the series individual chapters have been collected into fourteen tankōbon volumes.

In July 2020, Seven Seas Entertainment announced that they also licensed the manga adaptation for English publication.

==== Volumes ====
No.	Original release date	Original ISBN	English release date	English ISBN
1	December 25, 2019	978-4-86554-593-7	April 13, 2021	978-1-64827-090-1
001. The Goddess Explains The Summoning; 002. Ruins of Disposal; 003. Trample, or Get Trampled; 004. Soul Eater
2	June 25, 2020	978-4-86554-688-0	August 10, 2021	978-1-64827-301-8
005. Avenger(s); 006. The Powerful and The Famous; 007. A Man Named Hatty Schoel; 008. A Woman Called The Valkyrie; 009. Miruzu Historic Ruin
3	December 25, 2020	978-4-86554-814-3	December 14, 2021	978-1-64827-571-5
010. A Knight's Promise; 011. Golden-Eyed Monsters and the Heroes; 012. S-Ranked Hero; 013. Serasu Ashren; 014. Black Dragon Knights
4	June 25, 2021	978-4-86554-949-2	August 16, 2022 (digital); August 23, 2022 (print)	978-1-63858-367-7
015. Crisis; 016. The Strongest Pursuer; 017. The Five Dragon Warriors; 018. Civit Gartland; 019. The Power Gained from Enhancement
5	December 25, 2021	978-4-8240-0074-3	December 20, 2022	978-1-63858-828-3
020. The Dream That the Man Saw; 021. High Ranked and Low Ranked; 022. The Goddess's Representative; 023. Mask; 024. The Royal Capital, Monroy
6	May 25, 2022	978-4-8240-0199-3	July 11, 2023	978-1-68579-610-5
025. Eve Speed; 026. Things I Want to Protect; 027. Lizbeth; 028. Escape; 029. Group of Sorcerers
7	December 25, 2022	978-4-8240-0374-4	January 23, 2024	979-8-88843-120-7
030. Dark Scheme; 031. Connection; 032. Joint Battle; 033. Freeze; 034. The Four Revered Saints
8	June 25, 2023	978-4-8240-0537-3	August 13, 2024	979-8-89160-179-6
035. The Golden Monster Zone; 036. Hatching; 037. The Human-Faced Monster; 038. Start; 039. Trample
9	January 25, 2024	978-4-8240-0722-3	January 14, 2025	979-8-89160-632-6
040. The Heroes, in the Dark; 041. The Unmeasurable Person; 042. Beyond the Limits; 043. Ravage; 044. The Witch's Realm
10	June 25, 2024	978-4-8240-0869-5	June 17, 2025	979-8-89373-317-4
045. The Invasion; 046. The Witch's House; 047. Change; 048. To the Northern Monster Area; 049. Rushing Forward
11	November 25, 2024	978-4-8240-1005-6	November 11, 2025	979-8-89561-333-7
12	May 25, 2025	978-4-8240-1202-9	April 28, 2026	979-8-89765-333-1
13	November 25, 2025	978-4-8240-1424-5	October 6, 2026	979-8-89863-181-9
14	June 8, 2026	978-4-8240-1663-8	—	—

==== Chapters not yet in tankōbon format ====
- 050. The Battle of the Heroes
- 051. Oni
- 052. Silver World
- 053. The Beginning of the End
- 054. Existence Outside the Frame
- 055. Battle Outside the Walls
- 056. Ayaka Sogou
- 057. At Various Locations

=== Anime ===
An anime television series adaptation was announced during the second livestream for the "10th Anniversary Memorial Overlap Bunko All-Star Assemble Special" event in January 2024. It is produced by Seven Arcs (with cooperation from SynergySP) and directed by Michio Fukuda, with scripts written by Yasuhiro Nakanishi, character designs handled by Kana Hashidate, and music composed by Tatsuhiko Saiki. The series aired from July 5 to September 27, 2024, on TBS and other networks. (Note: TBS lists the series premiere as July 4, 2024, at 24:59, which is effectively July 5 at 12:59 a.m. JST.) The opening theme song is "Hazure" performed by Chogakusei, while the ending theme song is "Pray" performed by Hakubi. Crunchyroll streamed the series. Muse Communication licensed the series in South and Southeast Asia.

==== Episodes ====
No.	Title	Directed by	Written by	Storyboarded by	Original release date	Ref.
1	"The Goddess Announcing Her Summons"; Transliteration: "Shōkan o Tsugeshi Megami" (Japanese: 召喚を告(つげ)し女神)	Michio Fukuda	Yasuhiro Nakanishi	Michio Fukuda	July 5, 2024	
The episode starts with the main character Touka Mimori dreaming about his past. He awakens due to his classmate Oyamada harassing Sogou Ayaka, he to his own surprise tries to help her. When suddenly, the goddess Vicius summons them to her world to fight as their heroes against the Demon King. Due to the summoning, each one of them is bestowed with a special power. However, Mimori is immediately discarded by Vicius due to him being a E-Rank Hero, before he is banished he swears revenge on the Goddess and is magically banished and left to die in a dangerous dungeon for having a seemingly weak ability. In the dungeon, Mimori soon discovers that his skill is actually powerful and gives him a special perk that gives him a chance to survive and get stronger. Along the way, he discovers the corpses of other "heroes" who Vicius banished there after deeming them useless; their spirits commune with him and encourage him to seek revenge.
2	"The Ruins of Disposal"; Transliteration: "Haiki Iseki" (Japanese: 廃棄遺跡)	Tōru Kitahata	Yasuhiro Nakanishi	Michio Fukuda	July 12, 2024	
As Mimori kills monsters, he manages to increase his level in the hundreds and continues to explore the dungeon and learns that the Goddess Vicius had banished other people she found dangerous or annoying to her. He continues to kill all the monsters and increases his level and further develops his powers, he later finds the remains of the great sage Angrim who in his journal reveals that he too was summoned as a hero and was discarded after the Goddess had no further use for him. Mimori also finds some magic scrolls written in strange language, he comes to believe that this unknown magic could help him kill the goddess. He eventually confronts the strongest monster in the ruins which holds the key he needs to escape, he manages to trick and kill it. Meanwhile, a mysterious woman is shown on the run in the forest outside, trying to escape some pursuers.
3	"Encounter ~Avenger(s)~"; Transliteration: "Kaigō ~Abenjā(zu)~" (Japanese: 邂逅 〜AVENGERS）〜)	Hideki Takayama	Yasuhiro Nakanishi	Michio Fukuda	July 19, 2024	
Back on the surface and out in the forest, Mimori encounters a weak slime whom he saves and befriends; allowing it to join him, he names it "Piggymaru". Later, after disposing of a group of bounty hunters, he encounters the woman, who had been fleeing from them. He paralyzes and interrogates her, where he manages to learn more about the world he was summoned to. Afterwards, he sets the woman free as he understood that she was not a bad person and leaves. Meanwhile, the rest of the students struggle to get stronger and fulfill Vicius' expectations, except for those who are high rank heroes, excluding Sugou Ayaka who is struggling to fight without a unique skill.
4	"The Woman Known as the Princess Knight"; Transliteration: "Hime Kishi to Yoba Reta On'na" (Japanese: 姫騎士と呼ばれた女)	Tomonori Kogawa	Kazuyoshi Yamamoto	Tomonori Kogawa	July 26, 2024	(Note: This episode aired at 1:09 a.m. JST, 10 minutes after the original air time on TBS.)
After arriving at the town of Mils and registering to explore the local Ruins (using the name "Hati Skoll"). While outside the ruins, a rude and arrogant man claims that the woman Mimori encountered in the forest is Seras Ashrain as he met her before. But to his embarrassment and shame, she removes her hood and shows that she is not the person he thought she was. Mimori then meets the woman again, who calls herself Mist Balukas, and hires her to help him purchase necessary equipment. In the ruins, Mimori overhears the blowhard from earlier scheming with two other explorers to attack the woman for embarrassing him; unfortunately for them, Mimori paralyzes and poisons them and leaves them to die at the claws and fangs of approaching monsters. After arriving at the lowest level, Mimori finds a special treasure and again encounters Mist. Since Mimori is there for other reasons, he gives the treasure to Mist, and after Mimori agrees that Seras become his temporary bodyguard the two decide to explore the dungeon together. In the course of the exploration, Mimori, as he expected, discovers that Mist is really Seras Ashrain, an elf princess and knight with a bounty on her head. Back in the forest near the Ruins of Disposal, the bodies of the bounty hunters who had been after Seras are discovered by Civit Gartland and the Black Dragon Knights.
5	"The Chain Known as Trust"; Transliteration: "Shinrai to iu na no Kusari" (Japanese: 信頼という名の鎖)	Yūichi Satō	Kazuyoshi Yamamoto	Takehiro Nakayama	August 2, 2024	
After Mimori harvests the materials he needs from a Skeleton King and uncovers a mysterious egg, he and Seras return from the dungeon. Back in Alion, Kirihara continues to grow stronger in power and in arrogance, and to prevent any more Disposals by Vicius Ayaka agrees to take all of the weaker students under her protection. That night, Mimori decides to hire Seras as his permanent bodyguard and they agree, as well as confiding their true identities to each other. However, the next day when Seras presents the recovered treasure to the local Duke, her true identity is unfortunately revealed and she is forced to flee, with the most powerful warriors in the world, the "Black Dragon Knights", pursuing her. After learning about this, Mimori decides to help her and catches up to her just as she is at the point of being captured.
6	"Humanity's Strongest, Civit Gartland"; Transliteration: "Jinrui Saikyō Shibito Gātorando" (Japanese: 人類最強 シビト・ガートランド)	Kazunobu Fuseki	Kazuyoshi Yamamoto	Tomu Sashizuke	August 9, 2024	
Seras flees into the nearby forest, where she manages to take down several of the knights, before she is cornered by one of them. Luckily she is saved by Mimori; they attempt to interrogate the paralyzed knight but he is killed by a large spear. Mimori and Seras are then confronted by the Black Dragon Knights and their leader Civit Gartland, known as the most powerful warrior in the world: Humanity's Strongest. To prevent Civit's killing them both immediately, Mimori reveals himself to be one of the heroes that was summoned by the Goddess Vicius and convinces Civit to let him and Seras go free; in exchange, he promises to return stronger and fight Civit to the death. In his enthusiasm and overconfidence, Civit agrees, but the moment his back is turned, Mimori attacks and kills him, along with the rest of the knights with a new ability he obtained by fusing with the newly-empowered Piggymaru. During this he gains three new skills (Dark, Freeze, and Berserk) after killing their dragons, which he proceeds to test on the fallen knights. Mimori plants false evidence that Seras has been killed by the Black Dragon Knights, and after learning about Mimori's story and his true origins, Seras reaffirms her decision to accompany him. In Alion, Nyantan Kikipat. Vicius' envoy, takes charge of the Summoned Heroes on Vicius' orders and orders them back to the capital.
7	"Monroy's Bloodsport Champion"; Transliteration: "Monroi no Chi Tōshi" (Japanese: モンロイの血闘士)	Hideki Takayama	Ohine Ezaki	Kazunobu Fuseki	August 23, 2024	
As the Holy Alliance stresses over the deaths of the Black Dragon Knights, the Goddess Vicius takes advantage to promote the Class 2C heroes she summoned, and new information arrives that someone is claiming responsibility for the Black Knights' deaths. Mimori purchases a Lord of the Flies head-mask that gives him a new secret identity. Now traveling together, Mimori and Seras arrive at the city of Monroy and look for clues about the Forbidden Witch, who Mimori hopes will be able to translate his Forbidden Magic scrolls. While at a tavern, they learn that a group called the Ashinto is taking credit for the Black Dragon Knights' deaths and that Seras is presumed dead. They also learn that Eve Speed, a Leopardkin and undefeated Colosseum warrior, may know the Witch's location, but when questioned by Mimori she lies about having such knowledge. Further investigation reveals a special motive for Eve's continuing to fight in the Colosseum.
8	"Together with the Lord of Flies"; Transliteration: "Hae-ō to Tomoni" (Japanese: 蠅王と共に)	Norihiko Sudo, Yūki Sakamoto	Ohine Ezaki	Tomonori Kogawa	August 30, 2024	
Seras reveals that Eve is fighting for her companion, a young dark elven child, who is also currently enslaved and working at a tavern. Seras also reveals that the Duke of Monroy plans to double-cross Eve and have her killed in her final Colosseum match as all the other warriors before her all died in their own respective final matches. Mimori attempts to convince Eve to let him and Seras help her, but she refuses until she discovers that the plot against her is real. When she accepts Mimori's offer to help her and her friend, the child dark elf Lisbeth, escape together, they go to the tavern where the female tavern keeper has been abusing Lisbeth. Eve takes and leaves with Lisbeth, while Mimori remains behind and kills her abusive caretaker. Escaping from Monroy, the four find themselves pursued not only by the Duke's private army, but also by the group which has been claiming responsibility for the deaths of the Black Dragon Knights: the Ashinto.
9	"Dark Plot ~missing~" Transliteration: "Kokusaku 〜Misshingu〜" (Japanese: 黒策(こくさく) 〜missing〜)	Yoshitaka Fujimoto	Ohine Ezaki	Tsutomu Miyazawa	September 6, 2024	
After Seras lures the Ashinto into a trap where their leader admits to taking credit for killing Civit Garland and the Black Dragon Knights, Mimori kills the Ashinto first, then works together with Eve to kill the duke and all of the pursuers sent to recapture Eve and Lisbeth, with Eve personally dealing with those who betrayed her. After Mimori uses one of his new abilities to dispose of the Ashintos's corpses, the party then departs to the Land of Golden-Eyed Monsters, a dangerous region where the Forbidden Witch lives. Eve reveals that she has a special crest that acts like a map that can lead them to the Forbidden Witch. The King of Ulza is left shocked by the Ashinto's mysterious disappearance and is unsure of how to inform the Goddess about this. Nyantan is shown secretly training Sogou Ayaka and admits that she reminds her of little sister. Meanwhile, Vicius decides to send the heroes to the Land of Golden-Eyed Monsters for training in preparation for the imminent battle with the Demon Lord's forces.
10	"The Land of the Golden-Eyed Monsters 〜encounter〜" Transliteration: "Kinsei Maguntai 〜Enkauntā〜" (Japanese: 金棲魔群帯 〜encounter〜)	Tomonori Kogawa	Yasuhiro Nakanishi	Tomonori Kogawa	September 13, 2024	
As Mimori's group travels through the forest in search of the Forbidden Witch, they kill several monsters, with Mimori collecting special materials from them. During their journey, the egg in Mimori's possession recovered from the Mils Ruins hatches and a horse-like monster is born, whom Mimori names "Slei". They learn that Slei can temporarily grow larger and stronger, when Mimori pours his mana into Slei. At the same time, the heroes are shown fighting monsters as well, their instructors easily kill one. But Kirihara decimates a large number of them on his own and claims that one day he will rule over them. Close to their destination, Mimori and the others are attacked by a monster which Eve kills, but while dying it sends a signal to countless monsters who start to converge on their position.
11	"To the Limit, and Beyond"; Transliteration: "Genkai no, Sono Saki e" (Japanese: 限界の、その先へ)	Yūsuke Nakagama	Yasuhiro Nakanishi	Michio Fukuda	September 20, 2024	
Mimori decides to face the stampeding monsters with Slei and Piggymaru while Seras and the others take shelter in a cave. While Mimori takes down wave after wave of the countless monsters, elsewhere in the forest the other students face some of them and suffer casualties. Sogou Ayaka confronts Yasu for allowing two of his classmates to die, but he instead starts an argument with her. Kirihara also gets involved, but decides to ignore Yasu as he went on a rant about how powerful he was. Meanwhile, Eve worried about Mimori, decides to leave the hideout to search for him, but comes across some students instead and is attacked by one of them when they mistake her for one of the forest's monsters.
12	"Ruler and Sword"; Transliteration: "Ō to Tsurugi" (Japanese: 王と剣(つるぎ))	Kazunobu Fuseki	Yasuhiro Nakanishi	Kazunobu Fuseki	September 27, 2024	
Before Eve can be defeated, one of the students, Hijiri Takao, realizes she is not a threat, and the two have a conversation with each other before parting ways. Exhausted and wounded after eliminating all of the golden-eyed monsters, Mimori, Slei and Piggymaru are rescued by Eve, who reunites them with the others. After the battle, Hijiri Takao and her sister Itsuki begin suspecting that there are assassins among their instructors after the students' lives, while Vicius calls back the heroes in preparation for an imminent battle against the Demon Forces. Mimori's party reaches the Forbidden Witch's home and meet her in person, with Mimori hoping that she can help with his revenge.

== Reception ==
Rebecca Silverman from Anime News Network praised the character development and high school politics, though she also felt it was too reliant on tropes.

In BookWalker's Next Big Light Novel Hit poll, the series ranked ninth in the bunkobon category.

The series has 1.1 million copies in circulation between its digital and print releases.

== See also ==
- Hazure Skill: The Guild Member with a Worthless Skill Is Actually a Legendary Assassin, another light novel series illustrated by KWKM
