= Senga =

Senga may refer to:

- Senga (given name), the history and usage of the given name
- Senga people, an ethnic tribe of Zambia and Mozambique
- Nsenga language, also spelled Chinsenga and Senga
- Senga, a Thoroughbred racehorse
- Senga (genus), a genus of flatworms in the Bothriocephalidae family

== People with the surname ==
- Kodai Senga (千賀 滉大; born 1993), Japanese professional baseball player
