= Bothriocephalus gregarius =

Scientific classification
- Kingdom: Animalia
- Phylum: Platyhelminthes
- Class: Cestoda
- Order: Bothriocephalidea
- Family: Bothriocephalidae
- Genus: Bothriocephalus
- Species: B. gregarius

Binomial name
- Bothriocephalus gregarius Renaud Gabrion & Pasteur, 1983

Species of flatworm

Bothriocephalus gregarius is a tapeworm that parasitises the turbot (Scophthalmus maximus). It has a complex life cycle including two intermediate hosts, a copepod and a small fish.

== Distribution ==
The turbot (Scophthalmus maximus) is found in the northern Atlantic Ocean, the Baltic Sea and the Mediterranean Sea, and B. gregarius occurs in the same range.

== Life cycle ==
The life cycle of B. gregarius involves a definitive host, the turbot or other large flat fish, and two intermediate hosts, a copepod and a small fish. The adult tapeworm is an occupant of the turbot's gut. It lays eggs which pass with the fish faeces out into the sea and which hatch into free-swimming larvae, the coracidium. For development to proceed, the coracidium must be swallowed by a copepod, after which it develops into the infective stage, the plerocercoid. If the copepod is then eaten by a small fish, such as a goby, the plerocercoid survives in its digestive tract. A turbot becomes infected when it swallows the infected small fish, and this completes the life cycle of the parasite.

Off the coast of France, the plerocercoid larvae have been found in two species of goby, Pomatoschistus marmoratus and Pomatoschistus minutus. It seems that juvenile turbots feed on copepods, but these crustaceans are too small to form a worthwhile part of the diet of larger turbot, and these bigger fish become infected after feeding on the infected gobies.
