= Star Detective Precure! The Movie: The Mysterious Garden and a Secret Pair =

2026 film by Hanako Ueda

- Cover of the Blu-ray release by Marvelous!
- Japanese: 映画 名探偵プリキュア！ 不思議な庭と2人の秘密
- Revised Hepburn: Eiga Meitantei Purikyua! Fushigi na Niwa to Futari no Himitsu
- Directed by: Hanako Ueda
- Screenplay by: Yoshimi Narita
- Based on: Pretty Cure by Izumi Todo
- Starring: Hikari Senga; Kaede Hondo; Ikumi Hasegawa; Nao Tōyama; Misato Matsuoka; Minami Takahashi; Natsumi Takamori; Yoshino Nanjō; Miharu Hanai; Maria Naganawa; Atsumi Tanezaki; Satsumi Matsuda; Reina Ueda; Emiri Kato; Karin Isobe; Hina Yōmiya; Yuki Kaji
- Cinematography: Takumi Arai
- Music by: Erika Fukusawa; Misaki Umase
- Production company: Toei Animation
- Distributed by: Toei Company, Ltd.
- Release date: September 18, 2026
- Running time: 71 minutes
- Country: Japan
- Language: Japanese

Star Detective Precure! The Movie: The Mysterious Garden and a Secret Pair (Japanese: 映画 名探偵プリキュア！ 不思議な庭と2人の秘密, Hepburn: Eiga Meitantei Purikyua! Fushigi na Niwa to Futari no Himitsu) is a 2026 Japanese animated action detective fantasy film based on the Pretty Cure franchise created by Izumi Todo, and its twenty-third series, Star Detective Precure!. The film is directed by Hanako Ueda, written by Yoshimi Narita and produced by Toei Animation. The film was released in Japan on September 18, 2026.

Featuring the Pretty Cure teams from You and Idol Pretty Cure and Wonderful Pretty Cure!, Anna and Mikuru receive a request from Rain to protect Karin and her partner Alan from Dame-Dame.

== Plot ==
Anna and Mikuru receive a request from a fairy named Rain, who wants them to protect a girl named Karin and her fairy partner, Alan from Dame-Dame, as well as Karin's Garden.

== Voice cast ==
- Hikari Senga as Anna Akechi / Cure Answer
- Kaede Hondo as Kumi Hanasaki (Mikuru Kobayashi) / Cure Mystique
- Ikumi Hasegawa as Kurea Howa / Cure Eclair
- Nao Tōyama as Luluka Moria / Cure Arcana / Cure Arcana Shadow
- Emiri Kato as Pochitan
- Yuki Kaji as Jett
- Karin Isobe as Shushutan
- Hina Yōmiya as Mashutan
- Misato Matsuoka as Uta Sakura / Cure Idol
- Minami Takahashi as Nana Aokaze / Cure Wink
- Natsumi Takamori as Kokoro Shigure / Cure Kyun-Kyun
- Yoshino Nanjō as Purirun / Cure Zukyoon
- Miharu Hanai as Meroron / Cure Kiss
- Maria Naganawa as Komugi Inukai / Cure Wonderful
- Atsumi Tanezaki as Iroha Inukai / Cure Friendy
- Satsumi Matsuda as Yuki Nekoyashiki / Cure Nyammy
- Reina Ueda as Mayu Nekoyashiki / Cure Lillian
- Takuma Terashima as Satoru Toyama
- Yuichi Nakamura as Daifuku Toyama
- Akari Kitō as Karin
- Nobunaga Shimazaki as Alan
- Koki Uchiyama as Rain
- Jinji Nishimura as Dame-Dame
- Kyon as Dame-Dame

== Production ==
In April 2026, it was announced that Star Detective Precure! anime series will receive a film for September release. In June of that same year, the title of the film was announced, and will feature Pretty Cure teams from You and Idol Pretty Cure and Wonderful Pretty Cure!. Hanako Ueda will direct the film at Toei Animation, with Yoshimi Narita, who previously wrote Yes! PreCure 5, HappinessCharge PreCure! and Wonderful Pretty Cure! series, is providing the screenplay, and Emiko Miyamoto from Witchy Pretty Cure! series designing the characters and in charge of chief animation direction for the film. In August 2026, it was announced that Akari Kitō, Nobunaga Shimazaki and Koki Uchiyama was cast as Karin, Alan and Rain respectively, and comedy duo Cotton, consisting Jinji Nishimura and Kyon was cast as Dame-Dame the same month.

The theme song for the film is "First Prism" (stylized as "FIRST PRISM") by Yuka Matsui and Chihaya Yoshitake, and the insert song is "First Step" by Ami Ishii.

== Release ==
The film was released in theaters in Japan on September 18, 2026.

== Reception ==
=== Box office ===
The film ranked number 3 out of top 10 in its opening weekend, and surpassed 1 billion yen in the Japanese box office.
