= List of Star Detective Precure! episodes =

- Season 23

Release
- Original network: ANN (ABC TV, TV Asahi)
- Original release: February 1, 2026

Series chronology
- ← Previous; You and Idol Precure

Star Detective Precure! is the twenty-third television anime series in Izumi Todo's Pretty Cure franchise, produced by Toei Animation. The series premiered in Japan on February 1, 2026, succeeding You and Idol Precure in its timeslot. The opening theme song is "Hint in the Heart! Star Detective Precure!" (ハートにヒント！名探偵プリキュア！, Hāto ni hinto! Meitantei Purikyua!) is performed by Ami Ishii.

On June 6, 2026, a crossover special between Star Detective Precure! and TMS Entertainment's Detective Conan, Detective Conan: The Gold-Star Answer, aired on ytv, Nippon TV and their affiliates.

== Episodes ==
No.	Title (Note: English titles are taken from Crunchyroll.)	Directed by	Written by	Animation directed by	Art	Original release date
1	"Debut! Star Detective Precure!"; Transliteration: "Tanjō! Meitantei Purikyua!" (Japanese: 誕生！名探偵プリキュア！)	Kōji Kawasaki	Isao Murayama	Katsumi Tamegai	Rika Uehara & Daigoro Yamaguchi	February 1, 2026
On January 24th, 2027, Anna Akechi is a girl living in Makoto Mirai Town who, while walking home with her mother, stops to help a girl who had lost her hair ribbon after the wind blew it into a bush. Upon returning home, they are preparing to celebrate Anna's fourteenth birthday when Anna finds a pendant, which she believes to be a birthday present from her mother. When Anna brings it to her room, the fairy Pochitan appears before her and asks her to come with it, and she disappears after they are engulfed by the pendant's light. Arriving in an unfamiliar location, Anna meets Mikuru Kobayashi, a girl who had arrived at the CUREtto Detective Agency for her detective test and believes Anna and Pochitan to be detectives of the agency. Believing that she would be able to tell where Anna had been from the marks and stains on her shoes, Mikuru notices that Anna does not have shoes and takes her shopping to get a new pair. However, as Mikuru explains who star detectives are and the work they do solving cases for others, Pochitan leads them to a wedding hall. There, the bride, Mari Sohda, is distraught after having lost the tiara she planned to wear for her wedding, which her mother had previously worn at her wedding. Their investigation leads them to question three possible suspects who had entered the room after Mari had last seen the tiara: Shouta Utsumi, a photographer for the wedding, Mari's friend Tomoka Fujii, who had asked Mari to toss the bouquet to her, and Sachiyo Kouno, who had been preparing for the ceremony. However, they are unable to find the tiara, and Mikuru begins to lose hope until Anna asks her why she wants to become a star detective. She reveals that it is because she wants to help others as the detectives had once helped her; after Mikuru loses her hair ribbon in a bush, they realize who the culprit is and their method. Mikuru deduces that Tomoka was responsible, having put the tiara in the bouquet so that she could steal it once Mari tossed the bouquet to her. Tomoka reveals herself to be Nijee, a thief of the Phantom Thieves' Guild, in disguise and steals the tiara, fleeing to a clearing. Nijee reveals that the tiara contains a Makoto Jewel, which the Guild seeks to collect, as Mari's deep care for the tiara attracted the Jewel to it. He attacks, transforming the tiara into a monster called a Hanninda. Though afraid, Anna and Mikuru's resolve to recover the tiara resonates with Pochitan, causing their pendants to become the Jewel Cure Watches and allowing them to transform into Cure Answer and Cure Mystique. After the Cures purify the Hanninda with This Is Our Answer, they recover the tiara and the Jewel. The wedding proceeds as planned; as Answer prepares to leave, however, Mystique reveals that it is April 2nd, 1999, causing Answer to realize that she has traveled back in time.
2	"Introducing the Genius, Jett-Senpai!"; Transliteration: "Tensai Tōjō! Sononaha Jetto-senpai!" (Japanese: 天才登場！その名はジェット先輩！)	Yutaka Tsuchida	Isao Murayama	Hitomi Matsuura	Izumi Muta	February 8, 2026
As Anna's home does not exist in 1999-2000, Mikuru takes her to the Agency to meet with a fellow Cure who works there; however, they do not find her, instead finding the Agency deserted. They meet a boy who introduces himself as Jett, a 222-year-old fairy who can assume human form and works as a genius inventor to invent detective tools. He initially does not believe that Anna came from the future and that she and Mikuru became Cures until he sees their Jewel Cure Watches. Learning of their circumstances and that Mikuru had gotten her pendant from her grandmother, Jett deduces that Pochitan, being a "Fairy of Time and Space", caused Anna to travel through time. However, as Pochitan exhausted her power in the process, she requires the power of the Makoto Jewels, jewels containing the power of truth, to return to her original form. When they ask Jett for help from the veteran Cure, he reveals that she disappeared several months ago, prompting him to come from the London branch of the Agency to close the office of the Japanese branch in Makoto Mirai City. Though they vow to be Cures, Jett does not accept Anna and Mikuru as Cures; despite wanting to show him proof, Mikuru is forced to return to her school dorm due to the curfew, allowing Anna and Pochitan to stay the night at the Agency. The next day, Pochitan leads the group to Patisserie Chuchu, where a glass pen belonging to mystery novelist Eriza Kurusu, which she got at the Mystery Novel Newcomers' Contest after winning an award for her novel The Vanished Gem, has gone missing. As the phone signal is down, Jett gives Anna and Mikuru the Pre-Kit Voice Memo, which allows them to keep in touch. After learning from Eriza that the pen had disappeared after she met an old woman who asked her to shake her hand, only for the pen to be gone when she went to sign, Anna pursues the woman to the park. However, she has disappeared, and Anna suspects that she may be disguised as someone else. Anna and Mikuru deduce that high school student Harue Tanimoto is the culprit, as she had been pretending to use her phone after being unaware the network was down as she was fleeing. Harue reveals herself to be Nijee in disguise and he attacks, transforming the pen into a Hanninda. The Cures struggle to fight the Hanninda until Jett, having recognized them as Cures, reveals that the Agency's mission is to expose and stop lies and that a person can become a Cure using the Makoto Jewel born from their heart. Having resolved to fight against these lies, the Cures purify the Hanninda with This Is Our Answer. Afterwards, they return the pen to Eriza before returning to the Agency. There, Jett gives Anna and Mikuru the Pre-Kit Books, which are proof that he has accepted them as the Star Detective Precure, and formally welcomes them to the Agency.
3	"Everyone Come to the CUREtto Detective Agency!"; Transliteration: "Min'na oideyo! Kyuatto tantei jimusho!" (Japanese: みんなおいでよ！キュアット探偵事務所！)	Directed by : Takahisa Iwai; Storyboarded by : Noriyo Sasaki	Isao Murayama	Hiroshi Numata, Francis Caneda & Noel Ano-Nuevo	Natsuko Tosugi	February 15, 2026
Anna begins cleaning up the Agency, which has become her new home, with Mikuru joining her in moving into the Agency after completing the paperwork to move out of her dorm. On the second floor, they find a map of the area before Mikuru gets the idea to go shopping for supplies. Jett reminds them of their mission to fight against the Guild, revealing that its members are fairies like him and that, if the Cures fail, both the past and Anna's time will be enveloped in lies. Meanwhile, the Guild holds a meeting, as their leader, Usonoir, has learned of the presence of a new Makoto Jewel through the Tome of Mirages. Following Nijee's previous failures, he sends the general Ageseine to attack. The Cures go shopping at the store Kamellia Interior and learn from sales clerk Chiho Maeda of its symbol, a glass turtle sculpture which symbolizes their dedication to improvement. However, as they are shopping, the sculpture is stolen; the Cures find it amongst the stuffed animals, but the case is not yet closed, as the thief who stole the sculpture is still among them. Using Jett's invention, the Pre-Kit Gummies, which, when eaten, allows them to understand other languages for three minutes, they interrogate the suspect, and deduce that sales clerk Takuya Nakategawa is the culprit. Takuya had stolen the sculpture, placing it among the stuffed animals where it would not break. However, while helping tourist Tom Miller pick out a scarf for his mother, who liked growing plants in her garden, Takuya mistook the sculpture for a flower and picked a pattern for the scarf that he thought resembled it. Takuya reveals himself to be Ageseine in disguise and she flees after stealing the sculpture. However, she is stopped by a mysterious girl and fairy, who reveal that Usonoir has ordered her to defeat the Cures and steal the Jewel with grace. Ageseine then attacks, transforming the sculpture into a Hanninda and sealing the area off. The Hanninda traps the Cures, but their resolve to recover the sculpture allows them to break free and they purify the Hanninda with This Is Our Answer as the mysterious girl watches, noticing that they are Cures before leaving. Afterwards, the Cures return to the Agency, where Mikuru has decided that their first client will be Anna, in order to fulfill her request of returning her to her time. They resolve to work together as Cures to fulfill this goal, as Jett begins work on a new invention.
4	"Exciting! Our First Client!"; Transliteration: "Dokidoki! Hajimete no irai!" (Japanese: ドキドキ！初めての依頼！)	Directed by : Tsuyoshi Tobita; Storyboarded by : Yutaka Nakajima	Isao Murayama	Mitsuru Aoyama	Zhuxing Xu	February 22, 2026
The newly-opened Agency struggles to attract clients until the Cures are visited by Junichi Komatsuzaki, a university student and aspiring manga artist. His bag, which originally contained a manga manuscript that he had planned to show to a publisher at the editorial department, now contains fruits and vegetables as well as an apron. Suspecting that his bag may have been switched with someone else's, they visit the station where he had been. There, Junichi reveals that he had bumped into another person; however, he does not remember who they are. Meanwhile, Usonoir sends Goemon, a general of the Guild, to attack, as Goemon wanted to show the girl, a newcomer member of the Guild known as Cure Arcana Shadow, the ropes of being a thief. Learning that the person Junichi encountered has long hair and wears glasses, the Cures begin searching for her, but do not find anyone who matches that description. Goemon and Arcana Shadow begin searching for the object containing a Makoto Jewel, and Goemon steals the bag. Anna and Mikuru use Jett's invention, the Pre-Kit Light, which allows them to create objects by drawing them with light, to catch up to him using a trampoline. However, Goemon discovers that the bag does not contain what they were looking for and returns it to the Cures, as both groups begin searching for the manuscript. Realizing that the stains on the bag are paint, Anna and Mikuru track down Junichi's bag to the painting class Atelier Plenty. There, Goemon attacks, stealing the manuscript before transforming it into a Hanninda. The Cures use new attacks, Answer Attack and Mystique Reflection, to subdue the Hanninda before purifying it with This Is Our Answer. Upon returning the manuscript to Junichi, Anna sees the name Junjun Komattsu and realizes that it is the pen name of her favorite manga artist. With their encouragement, Junichi allows them to read his manga.
5	"Star Detectives in Trouble?"; Transliteration: "Meitantei no dai pinchi!" (Japanese: 名探偵の大ピンチ！)	Gaku Yano	Isao Murayama	Akira Inagami & Kenji Miuma	Yuki Nakabayashi	March 1, 2026
Anna sees Mikuru off to school in her second year of junior high school at Makoto Mirai Academy, while Usonoir warns Nijee that he will not get another chance if he continues to fail in stealing the Makoto Jewels. Upon noticing the rainy weather, Anna leaves to bring Mikuru an umbrella and deliver Jett's new invention: legendary charms from an old book, which are said to save the Star Detective Precure in times of crisis. Upon seeing Mikuru with her classmates, however, Anna prepares to leave and encounters university student Mariko Kitamura. Keiko, Mariko's younger sister, is a second-year high school student currently studying abroad in London as an exchange student. However, people have reported seeing Keiko in town, with Mariko seeing her at the station while heading to university. Anna decides to investigate Mariko's case, going undercover as a high school student using the Pre-Kit Gloss to transform herself. Meanwhile, Mikuru is summoned by Rei Kaneda, the president of the academy's student council, to meet with the chairwoman. The chairwoman tasks Mikuru with investigating the issue of ghosts at the academy, as people have reported seeing a mysterious figure on school grounds. Anna and Mikuru's investigations intertwine and they come into conflict, as Mikuru did not want Anna taking on a case by herself. Mikuru flees and encounters Keiko, with Anna also being led to the statue of two swallows after Pochitan senses a Makoto Jewel. Keiko reveals herself to be Nijee in disguise and he attacks, transforming the statue into two Hanninda. Unable to cooperate, the Cures struggle to fight the Hanninda, with Jett's invention failing to respond to Answer. The Cures are saved by Pochitan's intervention, but she collapses as Nijee and the Hanninda retreat.
6	"Miraculous Pre-Kit Mirror Loupe!"; Transliteration: "Kiseki no Purikitto Mirā Rūpe!" (Japanese: 奇跡のプリキットミラールーペ！)	Kazuki Yokouchi	Isao Murayama	Ken Ueno	Yuuta Ogawa	March 8, 2026
Mikuru, blaming herself for giving Nijee the idea to steal the Makoto Jewels, entrusts Anna and Jett with Pochitan's care before leaving to recover the Jewels. Jett investigates the connection between Pochitan and the charms both glowing, while Arcana Shadow is sent to retrieve Nijee after he left. She finds him in the forest, where he reveals that he intends to defeat the Cures, telling Mikuru to come to the beach Nijigahama. Back at the Agency, Anna confides in Jett, revealing that she blames herself for being unable to talk to Mikuru after seeing her with her friends, as she did not want to bother her. However, Jett, realizing that Anna and Mikuru have been influencing each other, tells Anna that they are a miraculous pair. With his encouragement, Anna leaves to go after Mikuru, reuniting with her at Nijigahama. The two Hanninda fuse to become a stronger Hanninda, and Pochitan senses the Jewels. Jett decides to bring her to the Cures, bringing the charms, the Pre-Kit Mirror Loupes, with him. Answer reveals to Mystique that, since arriving in 1999-2000, she has felt alone. Their resolve resonates with Pochitan, granting them the Mirror Loupes and allowing them to use a new attack, Flying Spectrum, to purify the Hanninda. Afterwards, the Cures reconcile and the swallow statue is returned to the academy, while Nijee is nearly banished for his failures. However, he reveals to the Guild that Answer may have come from another time; this shocks Usonoir, as it was not written in the Tome of Mirages.
7	"Yikes! The School is a Maze?"; Transliteration: "Taihen! Gakkō ga Meiro!?" (Japanese: 大変！学校が迷路！？)	Hana Shinohara	Satohito Sata	Ippei Masui, Shinichi Suzuki, Ami Konishi & Mai Ishii	Shota Suzuki	March 15, 2026
Anna transfers to Makoto Mirai Academy in class 2-1, the same class as Mikuru. She and Mikuru reveal to their classmates that they are detectives of the Agency, but they must keep their identities as Cures a secret. While heading to science class, they instead end up in the gymnasium; Goemon has transformed the school into a "trick maze" with his powers, in order to see how Pochitan would respond if the Cures were in trouble. In order to escape, they must solve puzzles to find the keys and progress through the classes, or else be trapped in the maze forever. Upon making it through the science, music, library, home economics, and art classes, and finally the gymnasium, they end up back outside. There, Goemon attacks, transforming the school's cherry blossom tree into a Hanninda. After the Cures purify the Hanninda with Flying Spectrum, the school returns to normal and Mikuru makes it to science class. However, Anna has once again gotten lost in the school.
8	"Pretty Smiles at Pretty Holic!"; Transliteration: "Puriti Horikku de Puriti Sumairu!" (Japanese: プリティホリックでプリティスマイル！)	Koji Ogawa	Yoshimi Narita	Yuka Takemori & Daichi Nakashima	Natsuko Tosugi	March 22, 2026
Seeing the Cure Answer costume that Jett had made for Pochitan and the cuteness of his inventions, Anna and Mikuru decide to open a store where people can buy products based on his Pre-Kit inventions. Jett believes that his inventions should only be used for detective work, but agrees to help because the store will benefit the Agency by raising awareness of its existence. Using the Agency's second floor as a store, Anna and Mikuru decide to sell cosmetics based on the Pre-Kit Gloss. As they prepare to set up the store and Jett works on prototypes for the products, they overhear Jett saying "Puri Puri, Pretty Smile". He explains that the phrase is the finishing touch on his inventions, imbuing them with fairy power. He then reveals his past; he had invented alongside his colleagues, believing that functionality in inventions was most important. However, their teacher Shinian had taught him the phrase and that cuteness was just as important, giving him her goggles as a gift when he graduated. As Jett goes to pay for the products they ordered, however, his goggles go missing. The Cures investigate the footprints and deduce that a Phantom Thief is disguised as one of the people who visited the store: Chiho Maeda, Taira Asai, and Morio Hanamori, a sales clerk at Hanamori Flower Shop. They then deduce that Hanamori is the culprit, as he did not react to Pochitan's presence. Hanamori reveals himself to be Nijee in disguise and he attacks, transforming Jett's goggles into a Hanninda. After the Cures purify the Hanninda with Flying Spectrum, the Pretty Holic store opens, selling the Pretty Up Fragrance. Jett, remembering Shinian's teachings, is happy at its success.
9	"Don't Make Assumptions!"; Transliteration: "Kimetsukecha Dame!" (Japanese: 決めつけちゃダメ！)	Directed by : Hyūga Yamamura; Storyboarded by : Kazuki Yokouchi	Yoshimi Narita	Seiji Masuda	Zhuxing Xu	March 29, 2026
Actress Shiruku Ieiri visits Makoto Mirai Academy for the television program Try It at School!, to participate in a play performed by the drama club to welcome new students. Seeing Rie's nerves, Shiruku is able to relate to her and leads the drama club in doing exercises to calm down. As the club prepares to perform the play, based on Cinderella, Anna and Mikuru introduce themselves to Shiruku. She tells them about her background as an actress and, learning that they are detectives but have not been receiving many cases, tells them to not make assumptions. On the day of the play, the dress that has been passed down in the club, which they had planned to use, goes missing. Shiruku aids them in their investigation before taking the stage, and Anna and Mikuru deduce that the culprit is one of three people: cameraman Akira Owada, director Tomoki Sakakibara, and manager Miwa Ando. Using the Voice Memo, Anna imitates the principal to announce that the dress has been found. They deduce that Tomoki is the culprit, as he had been hiding the dress under his clothes. Tomoki reveals himself to be Ageseine in disguise and she attacks, transforming the dress into a Hanninda. After the Cures purify the Hanninda with Flying Spectrum, the play resumes. Shiruku later visits the Agency, having heard about it after Rie recommended the Pretty Holic fragrance.
10	"Solve The Mystery Of The Painting!"; Transliteration: "E no Nazo o Tokiakase!" (Japanese: 絵の謎を解き明かせ！)	Directed by : Tomoki Watanabe; Storyboarded by : Takayuki Murakami	Satohito Sata	Nobuhito Akada, Mika Hironaka & Noel Ano-Nuevo	Yuki Nakabayashi	April 5, 2026
Moe Saiki visits the Agency, requesting that they investigate My Greatest Happiness, a self-portrait painted by her late mother, Christina Pipopovic Fumie, that had been found overseas and sent to her home. Fumie had been popular overseas about thirty years ago, but painted landscapes; the self-portrait was the only time she had painted a person. Their investigation leads them to visit the library, Atelier Plenty, and Patisserie ChuChu. Seeing the macarons that Kurea had baked, Moe is reminded of when Fumie brought macarons from overseas, which the Cures theorize Fumie had baked herself. As Fumie had been particular about all aspects of her life and walked her own path, Moe believes that the painting is related to Fumie's feelings about herself. Visiting the apartment where Moe lives, the Cures examine the painting with the Mirror Loupe. After seeing fingerprints on the painting, they realize that its correct orientation is horizontal rather than vertical. The painting depicted a moment from the past, when Fumie and Moe had ate macarons together and Fumie had lay on the sofa. Their feelings overlap and create a Makoto Jewel that enters the painting. However, Goemon attacks, stealing the painting and transforming it into a Hanninda. After the Cures purify the Hanninda with Flying Spectrum, the painting is returned and Moe and her daughter return home. Seeing them together, Anna is saddened upon being reminded of her mother, but Mikuru reassures her that she will help her return to her own time. As they return to the Agency, Arcana Shadow and her fairy overlook the city.
11	"Cure Arcana Shadow Appears"; Transliteration: "Kyua Arukana Shadou, Arawaru" (Japanese: キュアアルカナ・シャドウ、現る)	Hazuki Omoya	Isao Murayama	Mikio Fujiwara	Yuuta Ogawa	April 12, 2026
Chinami Hosho, the owner of the Hosho Art Museum, receives a calling card sent by Arcana Shadow, declaring that the Guild will steal the Starlight Princess the following night at 8 p.m. Hearing about the incident on the news, Anna and Mikuru head to the museum. They offer to help protect the Starlight Princess, a necklace, despite security having been increased. Deciding to survey the museum until the deadline arrives, Anna encounters a mysterious girl, who wishes her luck before leaving. That night, the girl, Luluka, disguises herself as a security guard using the Pre-Kit Gloss and commences the heist alongside her fairy, Mashutan. At 8 p.m., Mashutan cuts the power, causing a blackout; when the lights come back on, another calling card is attached to the Starlight Princess, revealing that it has been replaced with a fake. However, this is a trap, and Luluka steals the Starlight Princess after the case is opened through facial recognition. Anna and Mikuru pursue her to the roof, where she reveals herself to be a Precure and transforms into Cure Arcana Shadow. They fight, but Arcana Shadow overpowers them as Chinami reveals that all of the museum's items are fake. Their fight is interrupted when Ageseine attacks, transforming the Starlight Princess into a Hanninda. However, Arcana Shadow aids them in fighting it, leaving an opening for them to purify the Hanninda with Flying Spectrum. Afterwards, Arcana Shadow retreats and the truth about the museum's items is revealed, leading Chinami to display the real Starlight Princess. Anna and Mikuru question Luluka's motives and why a Precure is a thief, as she may have intended to expose the museum's lies.
12	"The Secret Of Cure Arcana Shadow"; Transliteration: "Kyua Arukana Shadō no Himitsu" (Japanese: キュアアルカナ・シャドウの秘密)	Directed by : Hideki Hiroshima; Storyboarded by : Hina Nakahata & Junji Shimizu	Isao Murayama	Katsumi Tamegai, Hiroshi Numata & Noel Ano-Nuevo	Shota Suzuki	April 19, 2026
Having learned that Arcana Shadow is a member of the Guild, Jett contacts the London branch of the Agency for more information. As it will take several days for the information to arrive through mail, Anna and Mikuru decide to investigate themselves, but no one in the city recognizes her. Meanwhile, Luluka and Goemon visit a CD shop to steal a wish bracelet worn by a customer, which contains a Makoto Jewel. However, as the bracelet grants a wish once it falls off, this would cause the Jewel to disappear along with the feelings imbued into it. Luluka infiltrates the shop disguised as a shop clerk using the Pre-Kit Gloss. The customer, Masami, reveals that her wish was to date a boy she has a crush on. Once the bracelet falls off, she decides to talk to him with the Cures' encouragement, but learns that he has a girlfriend. Her heart broken, she decides to throw the bracelet away, having believed the lie that her wish would come true. However, Luluka encourages her and tells her to treasure her feelings, which were genuine. After learning that the shop only has male staff, Anna and Mikuru pursue Luluka, and she transforms into Arcana Shadow to confront them. Jett recognizes her as having saved them before, but she reveals that she is only interested in Pochitan's power; her ability to sense when a Makoto Jewel is in danger and return it to where it belongs. Their fight is interrupted when Goemon attacks, transforming the bracelet into a Hanninda. After the Cures purify the Hanninda with Flying Spectrum, Arcana Shadow reveals that the Agency used to be hers before leaving. Afterwards, Masami decides to pursue new romance, while Usonoir decides to confront the Cures alongside the Guild as the date foretold in the Tome draws near.
13	"Star Detectives VS Phantom Thieves"; Transliteration: "Meitantei VS Kaitō" (Japanese: 名探偵VS怪盗)	Keitaro Nakajima	Isao Murayama	Yukiko Ueda & Keisuke Katayama	Natsuko Tosugi	April 26, 2026
Pursuing Nijee, who had disguised himself as a delivery driver and stolen a robot plush belonging to a boy named Reiji, the Cures confront him after he attacks, transforming the plush into a Hanninda. Though they purify the Hanninda with Flying Spectrum, Luluka arrives and reveals that Usonoir is coming. As she and Nijee fear that he could destroy the world before they are able to envelop it in lies, she transforms into Arcana Shadow to defeat the Cures. However, Usonoir arrives with the Guild to confront the Cures, as they are anomalies who were not written in the Tome and must be eliminated. It is revealed that the Tome was written by Mashutan's ancestors and deciphered by Usonoir, and that the Makoto Jewel was manifested by the feelings in humans' hearts. The Jewel was hidden by the Agency before it appeared in Makoto Mirai City and they interfered in the Guild's attempt to take it, resulting in it being shattered into fragments that scattered across the city. The Guild seeks the Jewels so that Usonoir's power to make lies become reality will be eternal; however, Pochitan possesses the ability to transfer the Jewels and restore the original Jewel, and the London branch of the Agency is keeping secrets of its own. Usonoir attempts to control Answer, but her resolve allows her to break free; after the Cures are saved by Arcana Shadow's intervention, the Guild retreats according to the Tome's instructions, though Usonoir vows that they will meet again. Before leaving, he reveals a prophecy: "In July of 1999, who holds the stone of truth shall become a great king. And the world will be enveloped in the shadows of lies." Afterwards, the plush is returned to Reiji and the Cures vow to not let the prophecy come true; Pochitan also gains the ability to say their names, shocking them.
14	"Pochitan's First Outing!"; Transliteration: "Pochitan, Hajimete no Odekake!" (Japanese: ポチタン、はじめてのおでかけ！)	Takao Iwai	Directed by : Yoshimi Narita; Storyboarded by : Noriyo Sasaki	Hitomi Matsuura	Zhuxing Xu	May 3, 2026
On their way to school, Anna and Mikuru are stopped by Rei, who forbids them from bringing Pochitan to school in a pouch due to only bags designated and given permission by the school being allowed. Rei is revealed to be the granddaughter of the academy's chairwoman, whose strictness and reputation as a top student and president have caused students to struggle to get close to her out of fear of getting into trouble. After dropping Pochitan off at the Agency, Anna and Mikuru return to school, where Rei is surprised by their kindness. Meanwhile, Jett receives a letter from the London branch of the Agency which Pochitan sets out to deliver to Anna and Mikuru, while Nijee and Luluka attempt to obtain the letter for the secret it holds. As Anna, Mikuru, and Jett search for Pochitan, she ends up at the library, where Rei notices her after finishing reading to a group of children. She recognizes Pochitan from their earlier encounter and, upon learning that she is a friend of Anna and Mikuru in their work as detectives, decides to negotiate with the teacher to allow them to bring her to school. When Nijee and Luluka attempt to steal the letter, Rei's resolve to help the students causes a Makoto Jewel to be created from her badge. However, Nijee attacks, stealing the badge and transforming it into a Hanninda. As the Cures struggle to fight both the Hanninda and Arcana Shadow, they resolve to reclaim the badge and Answer uses a new attack, Answer Gold-Star Sword, to purify the Hanninda. Afterwards, the badge is returned to Rei, who resolves to aid the Cures as president. Though Mashutan steals the letter, it is revealed to be an invoice for Jett's purchase of candy; the real letter was back at the Agency, which Jett opens.
15	"The Secret of Luluka Moria"; Transliteration: "Moria Luluka no Himitsu" (Japanese: 森亜るるかの秘密)	Hisanori Kobayashi	Directed by : Isao Murayama; Storyboarded by : Koji Ogawa	Takako Takahashi	Yuki Nakabayashi	May 10, 2026
The letter reveals that Arcana Shadow's real name is Luluka Moria, who once operated as a detective for the London branch of the agency. The Cures head to the intake tower by the lake where the Makoto Jewel shattered six months ago, after which Luluka disappeared. While investigating, with Anna wanting to uncover why Luluka joined the Phantom Thieves and believing that she is not fully evil due to her having saved them previously, they encounter Luluka. She tells them that the information is not important, and Anna discovers a scrap of paper which they believe could be a clue. However, Pochitan senses a Makoto Jewel and leads them to Utsumi, who has lost his camera. He is revealed to be Ageseine in disguise, who stole the camera and pretended to be the victim when the Cures arrived in the area. She attacks, transforming the camera into a Hanninda. As the Cures fight both the Hanninda and Arcana Shadow, they attempt to get through to her. However, she insists that she willingly joined the Phantom Thieves. After the Cures purify the Hanninda with Flying Spectrum, Arcana Shadow tells them that some cases cannot be solved through sleuthing alone before leaving. Afterwards, Utsumi, as thanks for them finding his camera, tells them that the scrap of paper is a photo. Back at the Agency, the Cures investigate the photo with the Mirror Loupe, revealing that it is a photo of a blue butterfly. It is revealed that the photo was taken by Ageseine as Usonoir attempted to take the Makoto Jewel, and that Luluka was present during the incident.
16	"Detective Ellie's Case Book!?"; Transliteration: "Tantei Erī no Jikenbo!?" (Japanese: 探偵エリーの事件簿！？)	Tomoki Watanabe	Directed by : Yutaka Nakashima; Storyboarded by : Satohito Sata	Yuuki Kitajima	Yuuta Ogawa	May 17, 2026
Eriza visits the Agency, requesting that the Cures hire her as a detective so she can get inspiration for her next book: a sequel to her novel Detective Ellie's Case Book. Their client is Kotarou, a boy searching for his missing cat Miko. While Jett and Kotarou put up flyers, the Cures and Eriza set out to search for Miko themselves. However, despite Eriza profiling Miko to deduce where she could have gone and donning a cat's ears and tail to think like a cat, their search does not turn up any leads. Eriza believes that she has been holding the Cures back in their investigation, as her deductions have been incorrect and she falsely believed that life is like in novels. However, Mikuru encourages her with words from her novel: "An unwavering heart fills pages of truth." Talking to Kotarou again, they deduce that his family had taken Miko to a pet salon. Because her fur had been cut, they did not recognize that she was the same as a cat they had encountered earlier who resembled her. Luluka finds Miko before the Cures do and transforms into Arcana Shadow to fight them. However, Ageseine, having found Miko's collar, attacks, transforming the collar into a Hanninda. Mystique uses a new attack, Mystique Strike, to purify the Hanninda. Afterwards, Kotarou and Miko are reunited and Eriza publishes the sequel: Detective Ellie's Case Book A Challenge From The Cat Detective.
17	"Memories With Mom"; Transliteration: "Okāsan to no Omoide" (Japanese: お母さんとの思い出)	Takayuki Murakami	Yoshimi Narita	Mitsuru Aoyama	Izumi Muta	May 24, 2026
After helping find a rabbit plush belonging to a girl named Nami, Anna is saddened after seeing Nami with her mother and being reminded of her and her own mother. With Jett having run out of candy, Anna goes out to buy more for him and get a change of scenery. She encounters Kurea, who takes her to Patisserie ChuChu, while Mikuru realizes that Anna was troubled and vows to become a partner she can depend on. At the Patisserie, Kurea tells Anna about how she makes birthday cakes for others, considering them and their feelings to make a cake that will make them the happiest. She offers to make Anna a birthday cake despite her birthday not being until January, as she wants to see her smile. With her help, Anna envisions what she wants the color of the cake to be: white like the snow was on her birthday. Using the Pre-Kit Gloss, Anna transforms into a patissier and helps Kurea bake the cake. She confides in Kurea that she regrets never getting to eat the cake her mother had bought for her. Kurea tells Anna that she should not hide her feelings, as she wants her to treasure her inner spark: her honest feelings, which are the "truth". Anna leaves after Mikuru calls her, meeting up with her in town. As Mikuru vows that she will always be there for Anna, Goemon attacks, stealing the rabbit plush and transforming it into a Hanninda. After the Cures purify the Hanninda with Flying Spectrum, the cake is finished. Featuring the Agency members made out of marzipan, as they are dear to Anna's heart, they eat it together.
18	"Star Detectives Assemble"; Transliteration: "Meitantei no Assenburu" (Japanese: 名探偵の共演(アッセンブル))	Directed by : Kōji Kawasaki; Storyboarded by : Satohito Sata	Isao Murayama	Ken Ueno	Natsuko Tosugi	May 31, 2026
Anna and Mikuru help to set up an exhibit by glassware artist Misako Shindo at the Hosho Art Museum. However, one of the exhibits, Lost at Midnight, based on Cinderella, goes missing after being mixed up with resin slippers that a man had been transporting and spilled. Jett returns to the Agency after entrusting Anna and Mikuru with solving the case, but their investigation does not yield any results. They meet Conan Edogawa, Kogorō and Ran Mōri, who had been in the city investigating a monster and decide to help after Conan recognizes them as fellow detectives. They deduce that the culprit used resin in order to identify the real slipper, as glass is cooler to the touch than resin. Returning to the Agency, Conan accidentally tranquilizes Anna while attempting to target Kogorō and impersonates her voice to explain the culprit's method. They had hidden Lost at Midnight in the fish bowl, which was filled with a mixture of ethanol and benzyl alcohol. As Lost at Midnight and the fish bowl have the same refraction index, it would appear invisible due to a lack of refraction. Chinami reveals herself to be Nijee in disguise and he attacks, stealing Lost at Midnight and transforming it into a Hanninda. After the Cures purify the Hanninda with Flying Spectrum, the real Lost at Midnight is returned. The Cures part ways with Conan, who, when Anna questions him about his identity, merely reveals that he is a detective. Note: First part of a crossover with TMS Entertainment's Detective Conan.
19	"Invitation to the Labyrinth Train?!"; Transliteration: "Meikyū Torein ni Goshōtai!?" (Japanese: 迷宮トレインにご招待！？)	Yutaka Tsuchida	Misuzu Chiba	Akira Inagami & Kenji Miuma	Lee Beom-seon	June 7, 2026
Anna and Mikuru's class leaves on a school trip; however, Goemon disguises himself as a train attendant and steals a guidebook belonging to Yumi Yoda, the trip's leader. When Anna and Mikuru pursue him, Goemon transforms the train into the "Labyrinth Train". They must make their way through the train and solve cases to recover the guidebook before the train's next stop in 30 minutes, after which Goemon will escape. Making their way through the dining car, where they find a woman's missing meal, and a car where they find a man's missing pocket watch, they locate Goemon on the roof by using the Mirror Loupe to track his shoe prints. There, Goemon attacks, transforming the guidebook into a Hanninda. After the Cures purify the Hanninda with Flying Spectrum, the train returns to normal and the guidebook is returned to Yoda. Along with their classmates, Anna and Mikuru enjoy the school trip.
20	"Legend From A Certain Island"; Transliteration: "Toaru Shima no Densetsu" (Japanese: とある島の伝説)	Hyuuga Yamamura	Directed by : Chiaki Kon; Storyboarded by : Satohito Sata	Hiroshi Numata, Yuka Takemori, Keisuke Meji & Daichi Nakajima	Yuki Nakabayashi	June 14, 2026
Anna and Mikuru head to Jieito Island after receiving a letter warning of a terrible omen that could soon cause the island to disappear. Upon arrival, mayor Kinzo Banda, who sent the letter, explains that a fairy has appeared on the island. Recent events correspond to the lyrics of an ancient song passed down as a folktale on Manju Island and Jieito Island. The song states that "A prankster fairy toppled trees and scribbled graffiti. When the manju buns disappeared, the hands of the clock began to move, and then the island disappeared." According to legend, a fairy arrived on Manju Island one hundred years ago, annoying the islanders with its pranks before causing the island to be erased. While investigating, Anna and Mikuru meet Kinzo's granddaughters Aki and Koharu and use the Pre-Kit Gummy to consult with a turtle said to be over one hundred years old. From the turtle, they learn that Manju Island and Jieito Island are the same, as the island's name changed one hundred years ago. After the manju that Kinzo had hidden for his granddaughters goes missing, they investigate the shed using the Mirror Loupe. They deduce that Aki was responsible for the pranks, wanting to cheer up Koharu after the watch she received as a gift from her parents broke. However, Nijee attacks, stealing the watch and transforming it into a Hanninda. After Answer purifies the Hanninda with Answer Hanamaru Sword, Jett arrives on the island and fixes the watch, and is revealed to be the fairy in the legend. While on an inventing trip, he was caught in a storm and washed ashore on Manju Island. His time with the islanders, who helped him repair his boat, became the inspiration for the song, and he became the namesake of Jieito Island. As the Cures leave, Aki and Koharu see Jett in his fairy form, but vow to keep it a secret.
21	"Detective Ellie's Case Book, Part 2?"; Transliteration: "Zoku・Tantei Erī no Jikenbo!?" (Japanese: 続・探偵エリーの事件簿！？)	Isao Murayama	Directed by : Yutaka Nagushi; Storyboarded by : Junji Shimizu	Mai Ishii, Ami Konishi Shinichi Suzuki, Takurou Nishinaka, Tomoki Watanabe & Daigo Yamazaki	Yuuta Ogawa	June 21, 2026
A new prophecy appears in the Tome of Mirages, stating that "The blue butterfly returns. From four flowers, she searches for the bloom to rest her wings." It refers to the return of the mysterious Precure Cure Eclair, though the Guild does not know her identity out of the four potential candidates. Meanwhile, Eriza visits the Agency in hopes of joining it, wanting to become a detective after Kotarou's smile inspired her. Despite the deadline for her novel approaching, Eriza decides to take the test to become a detective by solving a case. As Anna takes Eriza on a tour of the Agency, Luluka and Mashutan target the cell phone belonging to Eriza's editor Yoriko Henmi, which contains a Makoto Jewel. Henmi decides to support Eriza's dream of becoming a detective, as Mikuru shared the same dream and understands her feelings. However, Ageseine is revealed to have disguised herself as Henmi and steals her phone before fleeing into town. Eriza exposes the culprit by calling the phone, revealing that Ageseine disguised herself as Taizo Yamada. She attacks, transforming the Detective Ellie phone strap into a Hanninda. It is revealed that the photo of the blue butterfly depicts Eclair, who interfered in the Guild's attempt to take the Makoto Jewel before disappearing along with it. After Mystique purifies the Hanninda with Mystique Strike, Eriza passes the test. However, having found new inspiration for her novels, she leaves after having decided to pursue both dreams. Back at the Agency, Anna and Mikuru realize that their rooms once belonged to Luluka and Eclair, who may have been a duo like them.
22	"Shiruku's Resolve"; Transliteration: "Shiruku no Kakugo" (Japanese: しるくの覚悟)	Dai Satō	Kazuki Yokouchi	Seiji Masuda	Shota Suzuki	June 28, 2026
Anna and Mikuru are invited to Shiruku's performance of the play The Comedy of S. Meeting with her backstage, she reveals that she received a calling card from the Guild declaring that they will steal her earring that night at 7 p.m. The earring is significant to Shiruku, as she wore it during her debut audition. Anna and Mikuru split up to protect the earring until the performance starts, with Anna investigating the audience and Mikuru investigating the staff. While Mikuru uses the Pre-Kit Gloss to disguise herself as a make-up artist and investigate the dressing room of Shiruku's co-star Yoshino Sakura, Anna is pulled aside by Pochitan and spots Luluka in the crowd. They attempt to warn Shiruku, but she sees through Anna's disguise when she visits her and asks that she give her the earring. Luluka is revealed to have disguised herself as Anna, but Shiruku willingly hands over the earring to her and Goemon. Having resolved to protect the audience and the memories she forms with them, Shiruku takes the stage as Goemon attacks, transforming the earring into a Hanninda. As the Cures fight both the Hanninda and Arcana Shadow, she reveals that Cure Eclair has lost her memories. After the Cures purify the Hanninda with Flying Spectrum, the performance concludes and the earring is returned to Shiruku. Back at the Agency, the Cures and Jett speculate that Luluka stealing the earring may have been an attempt to restore Eclair's lost memories.
23	"Kurea, Sleuthing, and Ice Cream!"; Transliteration: "Kurea to Suiri to Aisukurīmu" (Japanese: くれあと推理とアイスクリーム)	Hana Shinohara	Isao Murayama	Mika Hironaka & Keisuke Katayama	Natsuko Tosugi	July 5, 2026
Anna and Mikuru speculate regarding Eclair's lost memories and true identity, as well as the looming threat of Usonoir's prophecy. Meanwhile, Luluka visits Patisserie ChuChu to steal the photograph displayed there, which was taken when Taira was sixteen years old and training in Paris. Kurea later visits the Agency to deliver Anna and Mikuru's food. Upon learning that their investigation is in search of a person who has lost their memory, she tells them that fragrance is strongly connected to memory. Later, while Taira is away, Luluka returns to the Patisserie and gives Kurea a calling card stating that she will steal the photograph that afternoon at 6 p.m. However, Kurea seemingly recognizes Luluka and is shocked that she has become a Phantom Thief. When Luluka arrives that afternoon, Kurea deduces that, despite having multiple opportunities to steal the photograph, she had sent the calling card so that Kurea would ask the Agency for help. However, Goemon attacks, stealing the photograph and transforming it into a Hanninda. Arcana Shadow confronts Kurea, who had followed them to the battle. Kurea recognizes Arcana Shadow to be Luluka and reveals that she had followed her "truth" after believing that the photograph may be there. After Mystique purifies the Hanninda with Mystique Strike, the photograph is returned to the Patisserie. Back at the Agency, as the lilies that had been planted there bloom, Mikuru realizes that their fragrance is the same as when she first entered her room there. Remembering Kurea's words, they believe that the scent of lilies may restore Eclair's memories, while it is revealed that Usonoir has stolen Eclair's Makoto Jewel.
24	"Case Closed with Rei!"; Transliteration: "Rei to Kaiketsu! Kaijiken!" (Japanese: れいと解決！怪事件！)	Directed by : Koji Ogawa; Storyboarded by : Keitaro Nakajima	Misuzu Chiba	Nobuhito Akada & Noel Ano-Nuevo	Zhuxing Xu	July 12, 2026
Jett works on developing lily-scented perfume that could restore Eclair's memories. Meanwhile, the academy's chairwoman tasks Anna and Mikuru with investigating mysterious incidents occurring at the school: the skeleton in the science room moving, the piano in the music room making noise, and the painting in the art room crying. Rei joins them in their investigation, and, in the art room, realizes that her unease was because objects in the rooms had been moved. Investigating the footprints with the Mirror Loupe, Anna and Mikuru deduce that the Phantom Thieves were responsible for the incidents. They realize that the Thieves seek to steal the key to the academy's gate, which is a symbol of the school. When the Thieves confront them, Pochitan takes the key while Answer and Mystique fight Arcana Shadow. However, despite Rei's resolve to protect Pochitan and the school, Nijee attacks, stealing the key and transforming it into a Hanninda. After Mystique purifies the Hanninda with Mystique Strike, the key is returned to Rei. That night, Anna and Mikuru remember the words of Eriza, Shiruku, Kurea, and Rei and question Eclair's true identity, while Usonoir prepares to take action in order to fulfill the prophecy and become the great king.
25	"Cure Eclair's Identity"; Transliteration: "Kyua Ekurēru no Shōtai" (Japanese: キュアエクレールの正体)	Directed by : Satoshi Okawa; Storyboarded by : Yoko Furuya	Isao Murayama	Katsumi Tamegai, Yoko Furuya & Takako Takahashi	Yuki Nakabayashi	July 19, 2026
July 19, 1999, the destined day, arrives. Jett completes work on the perfume, while the Agency receives a calling card from the Guild, declaring that "Today, at the land of Makoto on the map, Usonoir will steal the world." Deducing from the map on the Agency's second floor that this refers to Land Makoto Tower, the Cures head there. When they arrive, Usonoir has enveloped the area in lies and erased the people there from existence. Deciding that Usonoir has gone too far by using the power of Eclair's Makoto Jewel to destroy the world, Arcana Shadow allies with Answer and Mystique to fight the Guild's generals. Usonoir reveals his true form as a canine fairy and absorbs Eclair's Makoto Jewel, transforming into a giant monster. However, because the Makoto Jewel resists from within him, he goes berserk. Pochitan leaves with the perfume in search of Eclair and encounters Kurea. Though the perfume bottle shatters due to Usonoir's attack, its fragrance, known as Top of Lily and developed by humans and fairies, restores Kurea's memories. She remembers her identity as Cure Eclair and reunites with her fairy partner Shushutan, who had assumed the form of her hair scrunchie to stay by her side and gives her the Top of Lily Fragrance. Having reclaimed her Makoto Jewel from Usonoir, Kurea prepares to transform into Eclair and fight him.
26	"Cure Eclair Returns!"; Transliteration: "Kyua Ekurēru no Fukkatsu!" (Japanese: キュアエクレールの復活!)	Gaku Yano	Isao Murayama	Mikio Fujiwara	Yuuta Ogawa	July 26, 2026
Usonoir rampages after having misused the Makoto Jewel's power. Shushutan reunites with the fairies and is revealed to be the reason why Kurea was able to enter the extra-dimensional field summoned by the Thieves, which can only be entered by fairies or the humans they accompany. Despite Arcana Shadow allying with Answer and Mystique, they struggle against Usonoir's power until Kurea transforms into Cure Eclair for the second time. Though she possesses immense power, Eclair collapses after being unable to keep up with her own speed. However, her attacks weaken Usonoir, allowing the Cures to hold him off until she recovers and purifies him with Flying Infinity. The Thieves retreat, with Arcana Shadow telling Eclair that the detective she once knew as Cure Arcana is no more before leaving. Afterwards, Jett begins analyzing Usonoir's armor, which is said to be the source of his power, while Kurea learns that Anna is from 2027. While Usonoir recovers, Arcana Shadow becomes the Guild's new leader in his absence, vowing to defeat Eclair and destroy her Makoto Jewel to ensure that they have a future.
27	"I'm a Star Detective Now!"; Transliteration: "Watashi, Meitantei ni Narimashita" (Japanese: 私、名探偵になりました。)	Directed by : Yutaka Nakajima; Storyboarded by : Takao Iwai	Dai Sato	Hitomi Matsuura	Shota Suzuki	August 2, 2026
Kurea reveals to Anna and Mikuru that, though she worked at the Agency, she was not a detective. They are visited by the owner of the restaurant Princess Albert with a request to find its cook, who has been missing since July 18th. Using her experience as a pastry chef, Kurea questions the restaurant's workers and learns that the cook left before his payday on the 25th and did not eat the staff's stew. Kurea reveals that she once worked as Luluka's assistant, and they decide to investigate the cook's lodgings. There, he explains that he wanted to take a trip to get a break from his job. However, Kurea deduces that he is not the real cook, as the details of his story do not add up. The cook reveals himself to be Nijee in disguise and he attacks, transforming the cook's suitcase into a Hanninda. After Eclair purifies the Hanninda with Flying Infinity, the real cook returns. Back at the Agency, Kurea reveals that the reason she lost her memories was because, after she transformed into Cure Eclair for the first time and stopped Usonoir from stealing the Makoto Jewel, her own Makoto Jewel was stolen. As it was born from her heart, she lost her memories of being a detective that were stored within it. Having solved her first case, Kurea is welcomed to the Agency and receives her own Pre-Kit Book from Jett.
28	"The Mysterious Thief Decchi Agein!"; Transliteration: "Nazo no Kaitō Decchi・Agein" (Japanese: 謎の怪盗デッチ・アゲイン)	Hideki Hiroshima	Directed by : Misuzu Chiba; Storyboarded by : Noriyo Sasaki	Yukiko Ueda & Keisuke Yonechi	Natsuko Tosugi	August 9, 2026
Paul, an university student from London, visits the Agency, requesting their help after having received a calling card from the Guild. It states that "Today at 6:12:38, I'll steal the doll." However, unlike previous cards, it is adorned with patterns and the specified time is unusually precise. Visiting his apartment, the Cures learn that the doll is a bisque doll and family heirloom. After learning that air conditioning repairs and furniture and computer deliveries are scheduled for 6:00 p.m., they suspect that the staff could be culprits and vow to protect the doll. However, electronics shop staff Genki Maruta, furniture shop staff Kana Kitano, and computer shop staff Manabu Ueda do not seem suspicious. Remembering Luluka's advice to go back to basics, Kurea questions Paul about how the card arrived. She deduces that he was lying and was responsible for writing the card, as he claims that it arrived through the window, which was locked. Paul reveals himself to be Decchi Agein, a general of the Guild from London, in disguise and attacks, stealing the doll and transforming it into a Hanninda. Eclair uses a new attack, Eclair Illusion, to subdue the Hanninda before fighting Arcana Shadow, who reveals that she joined the Phantom Thieves to destroy her. After Eclair purifies the Hanninda with Flying Infinity, the doll is returned to its owner. Kurea realizes that there may be truth to Luluka's words, but vows to find the truth that lies beyond them.
29	"The Duo's Past"; Transliteration: "Futari no Kako" (Japanese: 二人の過去)	Hisanori Kobayashi	Directed by : Satohito Sata & Isao Murayama; Storyboarded by : Noriyo Sasaki	Akira Inagami, Mikio Fujiwara & Hiroshi Numata	Zhuxing Xu	August 16, 2026
The Cures pursue Goemon and Decchi, who had stolen a butterfly clip. However, they combine their powers to summon a trick maze, causing the Cures and Decchi to disappear. They find themselves in the world of Kurea's memories, where they witness her and Luluka's first meeting three years ago. After Shushutan and Mashutan became their fairy partners, Kurea and Luluka were approached by Mafuru Hanasaki, director of the Agency in London. She explained that humans and fairies were once partners, but, over time, humans stopped believing in fairies. The hearts of truth that still believed in fairies left humans, forming the big Makoto Jewel. As the Guild targeted the Jewel, she asked them to become Star Detective Precure and bring back everyone's smiles. Luluka passed the detective test after locating a vase that had disappeared from a mansion. Kurea did not pass, as she could not bring herself to reveal the truth out of concern for Lucy, the girl who was responsible for breaking and hiding the vase. However, Hanasaki showed them the Star Kiraring Brooch, which no detective had been able to pull out. She said that they would be accepted as true detectives if they could pull it out, and encouraged Kurea to believe in her own sparkle. Kurea became Luluka's assistant and began working at a patissiere to gather information, receiving the Top of Lily Fragrance from Luluka. In the memory of Kurea becoming Cure Eclair for the first time, the Cures realize that the green butterfly that appeared in previous memories is the key to escaping. Upon catching it, they return to the real world. There, Goemon attacks, transforming the butterfly clip into a Hanninda. Remembering Mafuru and Luluka's advice, Eclair purifies the Hanninda with Flying Infinity. Afterwards, Kurea reveals that she chose to work at a patissiere because Luluka loves ice cream, while Decchi reveals that Kurea's ability to use Top of Lily's power makes her special.
30	"Eclipse Shadow"; Transliteration: "Ekuripusu Shadō" (Japanese: エクリプス シャドウ)	Keitaro Nakajima	Isao Murayama	Mitsuru Aoyama	Yuki Nakabayashi & Rion Fukuda	August 23, 2026
The Cures arrive at the academy to help Rei and the chairwoman tend to the flowerbeds there, while Decchi, now understanding Luluka's motives, vows to help her eliminate Eclair. As they work, Rei learns that Shushutan and Jett are fairies and Kurea is reminded of when she and Luluka used to take care of the garden at the Agency. After Rei notices that the zinnias that had been planted have been cut down, Kurea investigates with the Mirror Loupe and deduces that the chairwoman was responsible. She reveals that she had pruned the flowers to allow new flowers to grow in time for the new term. As they resume their work, Rei is visited by a man who claims to be part of the landscaping company and hired by the chairwoman. He encourages Rei, telling her that the flowerbeds will be remembered by the students even after they graduate. However, after her strong feelings attract a Makoto Jewel, the man reveals himself to be Decchi in disguise and attacks, transforming the flowerbeds into a Hanninda. When Luluka arrives, at her request, Eclair purifies the Hanninda with Flying Infinity. Decchi transports the Cures to the intake tower, and, as Eclair and Arcana Shadow fight, Arcana Shadow reveals that Eclair is the great king. Receiving shadow power from Decchi, she transforms into a stronger form known as Eclipse Shadow, vowing to defeat Eclair and protect the world.
31	"Star Detective Cure Arcana"; Transliteration: "Meitantei Kyua Arukana" (Japanese: 名探偵キュアアルカナ)	Hazuki Omoya	Isao Murayama	Ken Ueno	Yuuta Ogawa	August 30, 2026
The Cures are overwhelmed by Eclipse Shadow's power, and she reveals that Eclair possesses the same star in her eyes as the Guild's members. According to a legend passed down to the Guild's members, who are known as the Forgotten Race after being forgotten by humans and fairies, a person with a star in their eye will become the great king. Mashutan then reveals that the reason Luluka seeks to destroy Eclair's Makoto Jewel is to erase her memories and powers as a Precure, allowing her to live a normal life as a patissier. She claims that this is Luluka's kindness, but Anna and Mikuru, refusing to let this happen, reach out to Kurea to fight once more. Despite the Cures attempting to get through to Eclipse Shadow, she is defeated and receives more shadow power from Decchi. However, Eclair manages to get through to her, and Luluka is freed from the shadows after realizing that her true desire is to be with Kurea. The lingering shadow power takes the form of a monster, and Luluka transforms into Cure Arcana with the pendant Mashutan gave her. Arcana repels the monster with Arcana Star Shine, but it becomes stronger with Decchi's power. However, she and the Cures use a new attack, Star Detective, to purify it. Decchi and the other Thieves retreat, and a new prophecy appears in the Tome of Mirages, declaring that "At the end of 1999, everything will become zero. And the holder of the stone of truth will create a new history." While Decchi leaves to meet with Mafuru regarding the location of the next Makoto Jewel, the Cures head to Patisserie ChuChu for ice cream.
32	"I'm Back, CUREtto Detective Agency"; Transliteration: "Tadaima, Kyuatto Tantei Jimusho" (Japanese: ただいま、キュアット探偵事務所)	Yutaka Nagaushi	Directed by : Misuzu Chiba; Storyboarded by : Takayuki Murakami	Mai Ishii, Shinichi Suzuki, Yu Ting Xiao, Karen Nishiyama, Ami Konishi, Ippei Masui & Lin Gui Du	Shota Suzuki	September 6, 2026
With nowhere else to go after defecting from the Guild, Luluka has been spending her time at Patisserie ChuChu. As Anna and Mikuru arrive, Kurea receives a call from Megumi, a girl who has lost an item that was a birthday present from her boyfriend. As the Cures do not know what the item was, all three people at the patisserie are suspects: CEO Reiko Saionji, vintage clothing shop attendant Eisaku Hamada, and high school student Harue Tanimoto. However, unwilling to disturb them as they are eating, Luluka decides to investigate using other methods. Using the Pre-Kit Gloss to disguise herself in a dog costume, she leads the children to safety before deducing who the culprit is. Hamada is the culprit, as he had avoided wearing his sunglasses, which were the present and fit Megumi rather than him. He reveals himself to be Nijee in disguise and attacks, transforming the sunglasses into a Hanninda. Though the Hanninda blinds the Cures with its light, Arcana is able to sense its presence and subdues it with Arcana Star Shine before the Cures purify it with Star Detective. Afterwards, the sunglasses are returned to Megumi. Luluka is initially reluctant to accept Anna and Mikuru's request to live with them at the Agency, as she had once worked for the Phantom Thieves. However, she accepts after being reminded of what a Star Detective fights for. The Cures head back to the Agency to have an ice cream party with the matching spoons that Anna got for them.
33	"The Path to Star Detective Starts With a Single Step"; Transliteration: "Meitantei no Michi mo Ippo Kara" (Japanese: 名探偵の道も一歩から)	Junji Shimizu	Yoshimi Narita	Yuka Takemori, Keisuke Meji & Noel Ano-Nuevo	Ryota Kobayashi	September 13, 2026
Anna and Mikuru show Luluka around the Agency and Pretty Holic, where she and Kurea receive business cards from Jett. Goemon appears before them, but not to steal a Makoto Jewel. As Luluka's mentor and senior, he wants to teach her a final lesson, as she had been his apprentice before leaving the Guild without telling him. He summons a trick maze and transports the Cures to a field with many doors where they must find the exit, after which he will accept Luluka as a Star Detective. However, after encountering Purirun and Komugi, who are from elsewhere, he reduces the options to three doors to avoid further visitors. The answer lies in the numbers on the doors: three, six, and nine. Luluka deduces that the correct door is three, as this referred not to the numbers on the doors, but to the three hints Goemon gave them. Upon returning to the Agency, Goemon gives Luluka a diploma celebrating her graduation. However, his strong feelings for her as his apprentice cause a Makoto Jewel to enter the diploma. As the final part of the test, he transforms it into a Hanninda, declaring that he will give Luluka the diploma if she can defeat both him and the Hanninda. After the Cures purify the Hanninda with Star Detective, Goemon gives Arcana the diploma and the Tear Arcana Rod. He tells her to not forgot her past as Arcana Shadow while walking a new path to the future, and declares that they are now enemies before leaving. Alongside the Cures, Luluka vows to walk that path together.
34	"Luluka and the Gold-Star Full Moon"; Transliteration: "Ruruka to, Hanamaru na Mangetsu" (Japanese: るるかと、はなまるな満月)	Xiao Wang	Directed by : Dai Sato; Storyboarded by : Ryuta Kawahara	Nao Miyawaki, Hiroshi Mimata, Takafumi Hino, Karin Omura, Calvin Zhong & Miyako	Zhuxing Xu	September 20, 2026
The Cures recover a wooden box from Ageseine, who had stolen it after disguising herself as a police officer. However, they do not know who it originally belonged to and take it to the police station. There, they reunite with Shiruku, who is serving as police chief for the day, and meet with Chinami. Chinami identifies the scroll inside the box as Princessless Moon, artwork from the Edo period by Motonobu Shirakawa. During a television interview, Shiruku asks people to contact the station if they have any information. Following the interview, Luluka apologizes to Shiruku for stealing her earring. Despite not forgiving her, Shiruku tells Luluka that, as an actress, she could tell that she was playing the part of a Phantom Thief. As such, she is not a bad person for doing so, as her friends understand her. Three people come forward claiming to be the box's owner: Yoshie Uzoe, Shiro Yahagi, and Ryan Howard. The Cures interrogate them, and Luluka deduces that Ryan is the rightful owner and that Yoshie is the culprit, having stolen it from him. Yoshie reveals herself to be Ageseine in disguise and she attacks, transforming the box and scroll into a Hanninda. Arcana uses a new attack, Arcana White Lily, to purify the Hanninda. Afterwards, the box is returned to Ryan, who decides to have Chinami repair Princessless Moon, and Luluka apologizes to Chinami for stealing the Starlight Princess. Chinami forgives her, as the incident led her to display the real Starlight Princess, and tells her that relationships, like artwork, can be repaired. Together, they look at the full moon.
35	"Love Detectives"; Transliteration: "Koi no Meitantei" (Japanese: 恋の名探偵)	Kokoro Kondo	Satohito Sata	Mika Hironaka & Keisuke Katayama	Rion Fukuda	September 27, 2026
At the recommendation of Mafuru, who is old friends with the chairwoman, Luluka and Kurea are invited to enroll in Makoto Mirai Academy. Luluka, though initially reluctant, agrees so that they can be together and improve as detectives. They transfer into the academy's high school division, but Luluka struggles to get along with her classmates, Mio and Shiori. She then notices a love letter on the floor, which the Cures inspect using the Mirror Loupe. As the fingerprints on the letter belong to Luluka and the sender, they deduce that it was dropped before it could be delivered to its recipient. As lunch break ends, they use the Mirror Loupe to create copies of themselves, who take their place in class while they investigate. However, they are unable to find any leads until they inspect the letter with the Mirror Loupe and find the phrases "after school" and "cherry tree" on it. Mikuru realizes that this refers to a legend at the academy that bonds of love formed under its cherry tree will last forever. However, three students are at the cherry tree when they arrive: two boys and a girl. Luluka deduces that a male student wrote the letter, as he stopped her when she tried to open it. Nijee, Ageseine, and Goemon, who had disguised themselves as students, reveal themselves. Ageseine steals the letter, but tells the student to confess his feelings directly. She then attacks, transforming the letter into a Hanninda. The Hanninda causes those hit by its attacks to fall in love with it, but Arcana deflects its attacks and purifies the Hanninda with Arcana White Lily. Afterwards, the male student meets with Mio. Luluka had realized that she was the letter's recipient and arranged the meeting, as he had planned to confess his love to Mio once she returned from studying abroad. She accepts his confession, and Luluka becomes known among her classmates as a "Love Detective". Meanwhile, Usonoir receives a letter from Decchi, revealing that the London detective agency has fallen.
36	"The Gold Medal of Trials"; Transliteration: "Shiren no Kin Medaru" (Japanese: 試練の金メダル)	Hyūga Yamamura	Misuzu Chiba	Seiji Masuda	Yuuta Ogawa	October 4, 2026
After Pochitan senses a Makoto Jewel, the Cures are led to a bookstore. There, a gold medal belonging to Shigezo Furuya, which he had won in a regional darts tournament, has been stolen. He had been polishing it to show to his friends before darts practice later that day, but it had disappeared when he returned. When the people present at the time heard him scream, his granddaughter Miki had been organizing books, but did not see anyone enter the store, his fellow darts club member Ume Takematsu had come over to tell him she was skipping darts practice, and high school student Haruna Makifusa had been at the shopping arcade. Investigating their footprints with the Mirror Loupe, the Cures deduce that Shigezo and Miki were near the gold medal at the time, while Ume and Haruna were farther away. They then receive advice from Haruna, who notices the Mirror Loupe and tells them to focus on things other than footprints. With this advice, they deduce that Ume is the culprit. She had claimed that she was unable to walk without her cane, but used it to steal the medal from a distance, causing its prints to not show up on the floor when they used the Mirror Loupe. When the real Ume arrives at the bookstore, Ume reveals herself to be Nijee in disguise and flees with the medal. Kurea and Luluka become suspicious of Haruna, as the details of her story do not add up, but they are forced to leave to pursue Nijee. When the Cures corner him, he attacks, transforming the medal into a Hanninda. Though powerful, the Hanninda shrinks after throwing pieces of its own body to attack, allowing Eclair to purify it with Flying Infinity. Afterwards, Haruna reveals herself to have been Mafuru in disguise. Back at the Agency, she reveals that Decchi attacked the London branch in search of the Makoto Jewel that Pochitan possesses and gives the Cures the Star Kiraring Brooch. It is said that whoever wears the star ring at its center will become a true Star Detective, and she believes they can achieve a miracle and pull the ring out. Jett gives her the Voice Memo so that they can stay in touch, and she leaves in search of the fairies who disappeared following the attack.
37	"Usonoir and Nijee's Tea Time"; Transliteration: "Usonowāru to Nijī no Tī Taimu" (Japanese: ウソノワールとニジーのティータイム)	Yutaka Tsuchida	Isao Murayama	Mikio Fujiwara	Shota Suzuki	October 11, 2026
As the Cures struggle to pull the ring out from the Star Kiraring Brooch, Pochitan senses that a Makoto Jewel has been stolen. They are led to Atelier Plenty, where Makopyon, a mascot suit designed by art class teacher Norie Eto for the shopping arcade's president, has been stolen. Anna and Mikuru, believing a Phantom Thief to be inside Makopyon, pursue it but lose sight of it at the crosswalk. Nijee and Usonoir, who were inside Makopyon, hide it in a tree and disguise themselves as customers at Patisserie ChuChu to lie low until the situation calms down. As the Cures split up to investigate, Anna, unaware of Nijee's disguise, asks him if he has seen Makopyon. Nijee claims that he has not seen it, but Anna deduces that he is the culprit. Despite claiming that he had come from far away to have tea, he knew what Makopyon was when others in the area did not. Usonoir reveals that he seeks to envelop the world in lies because he, unlike other fairies, cannot transform into a human. He attempts to use his abilities to force Anna to let them go, but her resolve allows her to break free. Nijee then reveals his disguise and flees with Usonoir to the tree to retrieve Makopyon, but is confronted by the Cures, who had deduced where it was hidden. He then attacks, transforming Makopyon into a Hanninda. The Hanninda, piloted by Usonoir and empowered with shadow power, overwhelms the Cures with its strength. Usonoir says that he and Answer are the same: they cannot lie, and she believes in her mother's teachings that "a single step becomes the answer" just as he believes in the Tome of Mirage's prophecies. However, Eclair knocks Usonoir out of the Hanninda, allowing Arcana to purify it with Arcana White Lily. Before retreating with Nijee, Usonoir tells Answer that lies and truth are equal, as, once everything is enveloped in lies, they will become the truth. Afterwards, Makopyon is returned to Eto and a new prophecy appears in the Tome of Mirages, saying that "Illuminating the true path, four lights appear. Light will illuminate the path home for the one who crosses time." Anna, distraught over Usonoir's words, finds hope in the Brooch.
38	"Kurea's Answer"; Transliteration: "Kurea no Kotae" (Japanese: くれあの答え)	Takao Iwai	Directed by : Dai Sato; Storyboarded by : Noriyo Sasaki	Katsumi Tamegai & Nobuhito Akada	Ryota Kobayashi	October 18, 2026
With the Cures going out for ice cream, Kurea is left alone at the Agency, wondering why she possesses the power of the Forgotten Race. She is visited by Ikue Meguro, a makeup artist who had been planning to travel to Paris to study makeup and received a calling card from the Phantom Thieves, declaring that "I'll steal your ticket for today's 5 p.m. flight to Paris." When Kurea goes outside to investigate, she encounters Decchi, who reveals the Top of Lily's connection to the Forgotten Race. It came to be through the bond between them and humans, being an important flower from when humans still remembered them. However, following the destruction of the London agency, the agency in Japan is the only place where the flower still grows. The Phantom Thieves surround the Agency, seeking to steal the ticket before the plane departs and the Makoto Jewel leaves the ticket. Jett explains to Kurea that, while the details of the principles of flight remain a mystery, that airplanes carry people's smiles is a fact. Kurea and Ikue use the Mirror Loupe to create copies of themselves as a diversion, but Decchi steals the ticket and attacks, transforming it into a Hanninda. Eclair struggles to fight the Hanninda, which is empowered by shadow power, on her own, and Decchi attempts to discourage her. However, when the Cures return to aid her, she remembers what Jett told her. Her resolve to use her power to save everyone, even if the source of that power remains a mystery, resonates with the Star Kiraring Brooch. This causes her jewel on the Brooch to light up, empowering her and allowing her to purify the Hanninda with Flying Infinity. Afterwards, Decchi realizes that the four lights in the prophecy refers to the Brooch, while the Cures watch Ikue's flight leave. They believe that, if the other three jewels on the Brooch are lit up, they will be able to pull out the ring.
39	"An Ojamajo Halloween"; Transliteration: "Ojamajo na Harōin" (Japanese: おジャ魔女なハロウィン)	Hana Shinohara	Directed by : Yoshimi Narita; Storyboarded by : Hazuki Omoya	Hitomi Matsuura	Zhuxing Xu	October 25, 2026
At Anna's suggestion, the shopping arcade holds its first Halloween event, with Anna dressing up as a grim reaper, Mikuru as a devil, Luluka as a vampire, and Kurea as a jiangshi. While helping out with the event, the Cures meet Hinano, a young girl who is a fan of Magical Doremi and dressed up as Doremi Harukaze. She was separated from her mother; though they locate her, the Cures see how Hinano's mother struggles to take care of her younger brother. They decide to have Hinano participate in the event with them before walking her home. However, Ageseine, disguised as a witch, steals Hinano's broom, which she and her mother had made together, by tricking her into swapping brooms with her. As Ageseine recognizes their costumes, the Cures decide to don new costumes to go unnoticed. Using the Pre-Kit Gloss, they transform into the main characters from Magical Doremi to pursue her. Though they initially struggle to fly on a broom and use magic, they are able to corner Ageseine. She then attacks, transforming Hinano's broom into a Hanninda. After the Cures purify the Hanninda with Star Detective, they receive Maho Dama as a reward for recovering Hinano's broom. They use their magic to enchant her broom, allowing her to fly alongside them as a witch. After reuniting with her mother, Hinano sees the Cures flying in front of the full moon.
40	"Luluka's Answer"; Transliteration: "Ruruka no Kotae" (Japanese: るるかの答え)	Hideki Hiroshima	Directed by : Satohito Sata; Storyboarded by : Takayuki Murakami	Mitsuru Aoyama	Rion Fukuda	November 8, 2026
On her way to school, Luluka encounters Goemon, who tells her that he seeks the Makoto Jewel within a gift that Mio received from her boyfriend Takashi. Like Luluka once did when she was a Phantom Thief, he issues a letter of challenge to her to protect the Jewel. She accepts the challenge, but the Cures learn that Mio has not received a gift yet. As her birthday is next week, they deduce that Takashi intends to buy a birthday present for her. However, Anna, Mikuru, and Kurea encounter Takashi and learn that the record he bought is not for her. As Luluka and Mio head home from school, she reveals that she does not want a gift, as she is happy to be with Takashi. Goemon attacks them, stealing Mio's compact and transforming it into a Hanninda. As Arcana fights both him and the Hanninda, Goemon tells her that her reflection in the Hanninda's mirror is her, but not her true self. Accepting her past, her powers, and both sides of herself, she returns as Arcana Shadow. Her resolve resonates with the Star Kiraring Brooch, causing her jewel on the Brooch to light up and empowering her. As Arcana, she wields both the Tear Arcana Rod and Shine Arcana Rod and uses a new attack, Arcana Stardust Ray, to subdue the Hanninda before purifying it with Arcana White Lily. Goemon questions if things would have been different if he had met Luluka first rather than Usonoir before retreating. Afterwards, Mikuru tells Luluka that she is glad to be able to work alongside a veteran Cure like her. Luluka questions why she knows of the existence of Precure, as they are supposed to be kept secret. However, she tells Mikuru that everyone has secrets they keep.
41	"Mikuru's Answer"; Transliteration: "Mikuru no Kotae" (Japanese: みくるの答え)	Masayuki Iimura	Directed by : Isao Murayama; Storyboarded by : Kazuki Yokouchi	Rion Matsuda, Aiko Fujii & Geon Ha Park	Yuuta Ogawa	November 15, 2026
At Patisserie ChuChu, Anna and Mikuru attempt to light up their jewels on the Star Kiraring Brooch, which, according to Shushutan, responded to Kurea and Luluka's feelings because they have true hearts. Mafuru visits after hearing from Jett about the Brooch reacting to the Cures; however, while the patisserie's customers and staff are in awe to see her because of her fame, Mikuru is conflicted. Later that day, at the Agency, Anna attempts to get Mikuru to open up. However, she tells Anna that she does not truly know her: her family, or her reason for being in London. They are interrupted by Mashutan, who has discovered the location of a Makoto Jewel. When the Cures confront Nijee at the park, he attacks, transforming the park's elephant slide into a Hanninda. Anna and Mikuru are unable to transform after their Jewel Cure Watches fail to open, leaving Arcana and Eclair to fight the Hanninda. Despite the Cures' encouragement, Mikuru, believing that she is not a Precure or a true Star Detective and unqualified to be one, is discouraged by Nijee's accusation that she is a fake detective. Though Eclair purifies the Hanninda with Flying Infinity, Nijee retreats after believing that the prophecy about the four lights refers to the Guild's four members rather than the four Cures, having preventing Anna and Mikuru's lights from lighting up. When Mafuru and Jett arrive, Mafuru is revealed to be Mikuru's grandmother.
42	"Sparkling Star KiraRing Brooch!"; Transliteration: "Kagayaki no Sutā KiraRingu Burōchi!" (Japanese: 輝きのスターキラリングブローチ！)	Satoshi Okawa	Isao Murayama	TBA	TBA	November 22, 2026
Following the reveal that she was lying, Mikuru isolates herself from the Cures, with Mafuru saying that, as a detective, she must find the answers herself. With the Cures' encouragement, she decides to tell Anna the truth using the Voice Memo's new recording function. Anna finds the Voice Memo in her room, which contains Mikuru's message to Anna revealing her past. Ten years ago, she went to live with Mafuru in London. When a gang attempting to disrupt Mafuru's investigation into the Lost Crown Case attacked Mikuru, a mysterious Precure saved her. This sparked her interest in detectives, and she received her pendant from Mafuru. However, while she aspired to become a detective, she struggled to live up to the expectations set by Mafuru's reputation as the "Proof of Dawn". She left for Japan after learning that there was another Precure at the Agency there, requesting to the chairwoman that her name be changed. The day she gained the courage to knock on the Agency's door was the same day that Anna arrived in 1999. In the present day, Mikuru approaches Anna to tell her the truth herself. However, Decchi arrives at the Agency seeking Mafuru's motorcycle, which he says contains their memories. He then attacks, transforming the motorcycle into a Hanninda. As Arcana and Eclair struggle to fight the Hanninda, Anna tells Mikuru that, though she was lying, it was her truth. Though her name was fake, it allowed her to be herself and the person Anna cares for, making it not a lie. Their resolve resonates with the Star Kiraring Brooch, causing their jewels on the Brooch to light up. With all four jewels lit up, Answer pulls the ring from the Brooch, granting the Cures their Star Kiraring Forms and allowing them to use a stronger version of Star Detective to purify the Hanninda. Afterwards, Mikuru reveals that her real name is Kumi Hanasaki. Though she decides to continue using the name Mikuru Kobayashi, Anna realizes that Kumi Hanasaki is the same name as her mother.
