= Senga ashwiniae =

Scientific classification
- Kingdom: Animalia
- Phylum: Platyhelminthes
- Class: Cestoda
- Order: Bothriocephalidea
- Family: Bothriocephalidae
- Genus: Senga
- Species: S. ashwiniae

Binomial name
- Senga ashwiniae Jadhav & Bhure, 2025

Species of parasitic tapeworm

Senga ashwiniae is a species of parasitic tapeworm in the family Bothriocephalidae. It was first described in 2025 from freshwater fish collected in Maharashtra, India. The species infects the intestine of the freshwater spiny eel Mastacembelus armatus.

== Taxonomy and etymology ==
Senga ashwiniae was described as a new species based on adult specimens recovered from freshwater fish hosts in India. The species belongs to the genus Senga, which includes cestodes parasitizing freshwater fishes, particularly in South and Southeast Asia.

== Description ==
Adult specimens of Senga ashwiniae display morphological features characteristic of the genus Senga, including a scolex armed with hooks, a segmented strobila, and hermaphroditic proglottids. The species is distinguished from other species in the genus Senga by a unique combination of characters, including the size and arrangement of rostellar hooks, the morphology of the cirrus sac, and the structure of the ovary and vitelline follicles.

== Host and distribution ==
The definitive host of Senga ashwiniae is the freshwater spiny eel Mastacembelus armatus. The species was recorded from fish collected at Niwali in the state of Maharashtra, India.

At present, S. ashwiniae is known only from its type locality and host.

== See also ==
- Fish parasites
