= Senga (given name) =

Senga is a feminine given name of Scottish origin, derived either from a backwards spelling of the name Agnes or from the Scottish Gaelic word seang, meaning "slenderness". Senga is also a Japanese surname of unrelated origins.

Notable people with the name include:

- Senga Beresford, Scottish politician

Hikari Senga (born 1999), Japanese voice actress

- Senga Macfie (born 1968), English-born Scottish professional squash player
- Senga McCrone (1934–2020), Scottish international lawn and indoor bowler
- Senga Nengudi, née Sue Irons (born 1943), American visual artist and curator

== See also ==
- Senga people, ethnic tribe of Zambia
