= You and Idol Pretty Cure =

2025 Japanese anime

- Promotional poster

キミとアイドルプリキュア♪ (Kimi to Aidoru Purikyua)
- Genre: Magical girl; Musical; Idol
- Created by: Izumi Todo
- Anime television series
- Directed by: Chiaki Kon
- Produced by: Saya Koseki (ABC TV); Maine Nishimura (ABC-A); Daiki Tomihara (ADK EM); Aki Murase
- Written by: Yōichi Katō
- Music by: Erika Fukasawa; Misaki Umase
- Studio: Toei Animation
- Licensed by: Crunchyroll
- Original network: ANN (ABC TV, TV Asahi)
- Original run: February 2, 2025 – January 25, 2026
- Episodes: 49
- Manga
- Written by: Izumi Todo
- Illustrated by: Futago Kamikita
- Published by: Kodansha
- Magazine: Nakayoshi
- Original run: March 2025 – February 2026
- Film
- You and Idol Pretty Cure the Movie: For You! Our Kirakilala Concert!

You and Idol Pretty Cure (Note: Official name You and Idol Precure♪.) (Japanese: キミとアイドルプリキュア♪, Hepburn: Kimi to Aidoru Purikyua♪), (Note: "You and Idol" is a pun on the phrase "You and I" and "Idol", alluding to the series' main motif of idols.) stylized as You and Idol Precure♪, is a Japanese anime television series produced by Toei Animation and the twenty-second installment in the Pretty Cure franchise. Directed by Chiaki Kon, with series composition by Yōichi Katō, character designs by Miho Sugimoto and music by Erika Fukusawa and Misaki Umase, it premiered on ABC Television, TV Asahi, and other ANN stations on February 2, 2025, to January 25, 2026, succeeding Wonderful Pretty Cure!'s timeslot, and was succeeded by Star Detective Precure!. It is the third series in the franchise to have music and singing as its main theme after Suite PreCure and Star Twinkle PreCure, respectively, with its main motif being idols.

== Story ==
Uta Sakura is a second-year middle-school student who lives in Hanamichi Town and loves to sing. One day, while walking with her dog Kyutarou, she discovers a peach-like object floating down the river and meets Purirun, a fairy who has come to Earth in search of the legendary warriors called the Idol Pretty Cure. Purirun's homeland, KirakiLand, was attacked by Team Chokkiri and their leader, Darkine, who plunged it into darkness and aim to steal people's Kirakira. Uta's resolve to make it shine, even in the darkness, grants her the magical items Pretty Cure Ribbon and Idol Heart Brooch, allowing her to transform into Cure Idol. Along with her classmates, Nana Aokaze and Kokoro Shigure, who become Cure Wink and Cure Kyun-Kyun, and later Purirun and her friend Meroron, who become Cure Zukyoon and Cure Kiss, respectively, they battle against Team Chokkiri.

== Characters ==
=== Pretty Cures ===
Uta Sakura (咲良うた, Sakura Uta) / Cure Idol (キュアアイドル, Kyua Aidoru)
Voiced by: Misato Matsuoka
The main protagonist of the series. Uta is a lively and energetic second-year middle school student who loves to sing and often spontaneously sings about her feelings. Her family runs the café Cafe Glitter (喫茶グリッター, Kissa Gurittā). Her catchphrase is "Kirakilala" (キラッキランラン～♪, Kirakkiranran). After meeting Cure Zukyoon and Cure Kiss, she greatly admires Zukyoon and becomes a huge fan of her, leading her to join the Idol Pretty Cure Research Club along with Nana. Uta transforms into Cure Idol using the Idol Heart Brooch. Her "idol smile" is her form of fan-service and her theme color is pink.
Nana Aokaze (蒼風なな, Aokaze Nana) / Cure Wink (キュアウインク, Kyua Uinku)
Voiced by: Minami Takahashi
Nana is a gentle and intelligent second-year middle school student in the same class as Uta, who has been friends with her since childhood, when they played piano together. She is skilled at playing the piano and is hardworking and righteous. Her catchphrase is "Step forward with a Win-Win Wink! (一歩踏み出す Win-Win ウインク!, Ippo Fumidasu Win-Win U~inku!)". Nana transforms into Cure Wink using the Idol Heart Brooch. Her "winking" is her form of fan-service and her theme color is blue.
Kokoro Shigure (紫雨こころ, Shigure Kokoro) / Cure Kyun-Kyun (キュアキュンキュン, Kyua Kyun-Kyun)
Voiced by: Natsumi Takamori
Kokoro is a first-year middle school student who is good at dancing, but hides her passion. She is a fan of the Cures and the leader of the Cure Idol and Cure Wink Research Club. Her catchphrase is "My heart is fluttering!" (心キュンキュンしてます！, Kokoro kyun-kyun shite-masu!). Kokoro transforms into Cure Kyun-Kyun using the Idol Heart Brooch. Her "kyun-kyun pose" is her form of fan-service and her theme color is purple.

Purirun (プリルン) / Purin Tanaka (田中ぷりん, Tanaka Purin) / Cure Zukyoon (キュアズキューン, Kyua Zukyūn)
Voiced by: Yoshino Nanjō (Note: Yoshino Nanjō was credited as ??? for Cure Zukyoon in episodes 17 and 18)
Purirun is an easygoing fairy from KirakiLand who came to Earth with Meroron in search of the Idol Pretty Cure. Kirakira can be seen when she blinks her eyes. She often ends her sentences with "Puri" (～プリ). It is later revealed that she sacrificed her memories with Uta using the Heart Kirari Lock in exchange for the power to transform into Cure Zukyoon, one of two mysterious Cures who appear to help the Cures fight Cuttinda. After Zakkuri transforms her into a Kurayaminda, she is saved by Uta and regains her memories. Purirun transforms into Cure Zukyoon using the Kirakira Showtime Mic, along with Meroron. Her "zukyoon (Note: "Zukyoon" means a strong feeling that strikes into one's heart.)" is her form of fan-service and her theme color is white and her secondary color is green.
Meroron (メロロン) / Meron Tanaka (田中めろん, Tanaka Meron) / Cure Kiss (キュアキッス, Kyua Kissu)
Voiced by: Miharu Hanai (Note: Miharu Hanai was credited as ??? for Cure Kiss in episodes 17 and 18)
Meroron is a strong-willed and cheeky fairy from KirakiLand who came to Earth in search of Purirun, whom she considers her only friend and develops an affection for, admiring her to the point of considering the Idol Pretty Cure, especially Uta, her rivals. She is a talented cook and has a tendency to recite poems about Purirun or current situations. She often ends her sentences with "Mero" (～メロ). It is later revealed that she sacrificed her future with Purirun using the Heart Kirari Lock in exchange for the power to transform into Cure Kiss, one of two mysterious Cures who appear to help the Cures fight Cuttinda. Although Meroron fights alongside the Cures, she refuses to befriend them, stating that the only one she has is Purirun. With Nana's help, she grows to trust the Cures and decides to be friends with them. However, the Heart Kirari Lock appears and traps her inside, plunging her heart into darkness. She is revealed to be a fairy of darkness, born according to a legend in KirakiLand, stating that, when signs of darkness appear in the world, one who knows darkness would be born along with the Heart Kirari Lock. Darkine attempts to recruit Meroron into Team Chokkiri, but after confronting her darkness, Meroron is able to free herself and makes amends with the Cures for her harsh behavior toward them. Meroron transforms into Cure Kiss using the Kirakira Showtime Mic, along with Purirun. Her "kiss" is her form of fan-service and her theme color is black and her secondary color is pastel pink.

=== KirakiLand ===
Queen Pikarine (女王ピカリーネ, Joō Pikarīne)
Voiced by: Sayaka Ohara
Queen Pikarine is the ruler of KirakiLand, who sent Purirun and Meroron to Earth to find the Idol Pretty Cure. She is worried about the Cures' popularity on Earth and Darkine's plans, tasking them with only collecting the Kirarun Ribbons to restore KirakiLand, ensuring the Cures' non-existence before Darkine finds out about them. Following the final battle against Darkine, Pikarine resumes her position as ruler, having decided that KirakiLand will coexist with KurakuLand—but not before apologizing to the Cures for being paranoid about them declaring an all-out war on Darkine first, which was why Team Chokkiri wanted to terraform Earth after successfully conquering KirakiLand to begin with.
Tanakhan (タナカーン, Tanakān) / Tanaka (田中)
Voiced by: Junichi Suwabe
Tanaka is a mysterious manager who appears before Uta and Nana. He is actually Tanakhan, a fairy from KirakiLand and Purirun's friend, who Pikarine sent to Earth to help the Cures as their manager, with him disguising himself as a human. Though he takes his job seriously, he has a soft spot to Purirun's requests.

=== Team Chokkiri ===
Team Chokkiri (チョッキリ団, Chokkiri-dan) are the main antagonists of the series, who originated from KurakuLand (クラクランド, Kurakulando). Led by Darkine, they plunged KirakiLand into darkness and stole its people's Kirakira, and they now aim to do the same with Earth via terraformation. Their name is derived from chokkiri (ちょっきり), meaning "snip". When the generals summon Makkuranda and when Darkine transforms the generals into monsters, they say "Plunge the world into pitch-black darkness. (世界中をクラクラの真っ黒闇にせよ).

==== Leaders ====
Darkine (ダークイーネ, Dākuīne)
Voiced by: Rina Satō
Darkine is the leader of Team Chokkiri and the main antagonist of the series. She is an evil fairy from KurakuLand who was born from humanity's darkness and subdued KirakiLand with darkness after cutting the Big Kirakira Ribbon. She often resides in her generals' shadows as a way to communicate with them, and can transform them into monsters as punishment after they have failed her. She is also capable of summoning Darkranda. In episode 17, she steals Cutty's Kirakira, transforming him into a monster called Cuttinda (カッティンダー, Kattindā), and in episode 27 is revealed to have brainwashed Cutty and Zakkuri into joining Team Chokkiri. In episode 30, along with Jogi, she unsuccessfully tries to recruit Meroron into Team Chokkiri. She takes action after her generals are defeated, attacking KirakiLand and attempting to cut the Big Kirakira Ribbon again, but is stopped by the shield TSUBOMI. She later attacks Hanamichi Town with an army of Darkranda, plunging both Earth and KirakiLand into darkness and trapping Hanamichi Town's residents in crystals, including the Cures. However, Uta is able to break free from the crystal and free everyone with her song. Darkine is ultimately purified by the Cures and returns to her true form, a fairy, having realized that light and darkness can coexist.

==== Generals ====
Darkine's minions under Chokkirine's command, who have the ability to create Makkuranda, Kurayaminda, and Darkranda using peoples' stolen Kirakira or using their inner darkness. Their names are related to cutting/chopping/slicing objects. If they fail too many times, they are transformed into a robotic monster as punishment by Darkine or Jogi, who steal their Kirakira and corrupt their hearts.

Kazuma Toya (燈夜カズマ, Tōya Kazuma) / Jogi (ジョギ)
Voiced by: Yū Hayashi
Jogi is a mysterious new general of Team Chokkiri who first appears in episode 25. He is cruel and cunning, being willing to betray his colleagues to achieve his goals. Episode 37 reveals that he was once Kazuma Toya, who was Kaito's best friend and encouraged him to join an idol audition alongside him, but came to harbor a grudge against Kaito when he passed the audition instead of Kazuma. Unlike the other three generals, who steal the Kirakira of their victims when they are happy, Jogi envelops his victims in their own darkness when they are in despair. He seems to be the general closest to Darkine, as he helps her in her plans to recruit Meroron into Team Chokkiri in episode 30. However, he claims to not be the same as the other three initial generals and does not consider himself part of Team Chokkiri, but rather more an ally to Darkine. After he is purified by Cure Connect, he returns to his original self as Kazuma and reconciles with Kaito, deciding to be an idol alongside him with his encouragement.
Chokkirine (チョッキリーヌ, Chokkirīnu)
Voiced by: Sayuri Yahagi
Chokkirine is the initial acting leader and second-in-command of Team Chokkiri, who is loyal to Darkine and calls her "Lady Darkine" (ダークイーネ様, Dākuīne-Sama). She mostly sends Cutty and Zakkuri to fight the Cures, but following their departures is forced to work with Jogi upon his formal arrival to their headquarters in episode 30. Since Jogi's arrival, she seems to be demoted from her second-in-command role, as she is mainly tasked with summoning Darkrandas while starting to miss Cutty and Zakkuri's companionship. Following her repeated failure against the Cures and being given a final chance to defeat them, Darkine returns her to the darkness as punishment. However, she is revealed to be alive, but imprisoned by Darkine. During her attack on Hanamichi Town, Darkine revives and strengthens Chokkirine, who attacks the Cures with an army of Darkranda. However, they purify her after Cuttin and Zakkurin get through to her and convince her to work with them again as a trio. She reveals that Darkine created her and that she is half of Darkine's essence, before Darkine kills her as punishment for failing to defeat the Cures and for having seen the light. After the final battle, Chokkirine is revived as a fairy named Chokkirin.
Zakkurin (ザックリン, Zakkurin) / Zakkuri (ザックリー, Zakkurī)
Voiced by: Setsuji Satō
Zakkurin is a fairy from Kirakiland who was brainwashed by Darkine and became Zakkuri, a general of Team Chokkiri who first attacked in Episode 3. As Zakkuri, he is dramatic and sarcastic, liking to tease his colleagues, and is a sore loser. He has a rivalry with Cure Wink, who helps him after he collapses from exhaustion. She attempts to convince him to stop stealing Kirakira; though he refuses and lashes out at her, he comes to regret breaking her heart. After his constant failures and developing a darkness within him, Jogi envelops him in his own darkness, transforming him into a monster called Zakkurinda (ザックリンダー, Zakkurindā). However, he is purified by Cure Wink and leaves Team Chokkiri in Episode 25.
Cuttin (カッティン, Kattin) / Cutty (カッティー, Kattī)
Voiced by: Hiroki Yamada
Cuttin is a fairy from Kirakiland who was brainwashed by Darkine and became Cutty, a general of Team Chokkiri who was the first general to attack, attacking in Episode 1. As Cutty, though stoic and task-oriented, he shows emotion when things do not go as planned. Despite his duty, he secretly admires the Cures, and becomes their fan, especially of Cure Idol. After his constant failures and developing Kirakira within him, Darkine steals his Kirakira, transforming him into a monster called Cuttinda (カッティンダー, Kattindā). However, he is purified by Cure Zukyoon and Cure Kiss, who arrive to aid the Cures, and leaves Team Chokkiri in Episode 17.

==== Monsters ====
Makkuranda (マックランダー, Makkurandā)
Voiced by: Masaaki Yano
Makkuranda are the main monsters of the series, who Team Chokkiri's generals create from people, using their stolen Kirakira and crystals that the person is trapped in. The Makkurandas' name is derived from makkura (真っ黒), meaning "pitch black". Episode 12 introduces a more powerful type of Makkuranda, the Kurayaminda (クラヤミンダー, Kurayamindā), summoned with crystals enhanced by Darkine. The Kurayamindas' name is derived from kurayami (暗闇), meaning "darkness". Episode 30 introduces an even more powerful type of Makkuranda, the Darkranda (ダークランダー, Dākurandā), summoned by staining their hearts with darkness, which turns their ribbons black.

=== Family members ===
Kazu Sakura (咲良和, Sakura Kazu)
Voiced by: Hiroya Egashira
Kazu is Uta's father, who is the owner and head chef of Cafe Glitter.
Oto Sakura (咲良音, Sakura Oto)
Voiced by: Sayaka Kitahara
Oto is Uta's mother, who is a waitress of Cafe Glitter.
Hamori Sakura (咲良はもり, Sakura Hamori)
Voiced by: Yuko Iida
Hamori is Uta's younger sister, who sometimes teases her when she tends to herself.
Kyutarou (きゅーたろう, Kyūtarou)
Voiced by: Kenjiro Tsuda (Note: Kenjiro Tsuda was later uncredited starting from episode 5 except episode 28)
Kyutarou is Uta's pet dog, who lived with Uta's grandparents until Atsuko's death, after which he was sent to live with Uta's family.
Heiji Sakura (咲良平治, Sakura Heiji)
Voiced by: Koichi Makishima
Heiji is Uta's grandfather. When Uta visits him with her family, Heiji attempts to ask her to help clean Atsuko's room, but she becomes upset and runs to a different room. Heiji later apologizes to everyone for making them worry before telling Nana and Kokoro about a treasure that Atsuko had buried. Later that day, when Uta and her friends return, Heiji explains how Atsuko treasured the spoon that Uta had given her. During the karaoke tournament, Heiji reflects on how glad he is to have had Kyutarou live with Uta. When Uta's family leaves, Heiji is shocked when Uta tells him to call her when he is ready to clean Atsuko's room, and thinks about how much Uta has grown as they leave.
Atsuko Sakura (咲良温子, Sakura Atsuko)
Voiced by: Tamie Kubota
Atsuko is Uta's late grandmother, who died when she was young.
Hajime Aokaze (蒼風一, Aokaze Hajime)
Voiced by: Toshiki Watanabe
Hajime is Nana's father, who works at Shugemo Shopping Center.
Mutsumi Aokaze (蒼風睦美, Aokaze Mutsumi)
Voiced by: Meiko Kawasaki
Mutsumi is Nana's mother, who is a pianist and is currently performing abroad in France.
Ai Shigure (紫雨愛, Shigure Ai)
Voiced by: Yumi Kawashima
Ai is Kokoro's widowed mother.
Shinji Shigure (紫雨信二, Shigure Shinji)
Voiced by: Masaaki Yano
Shinji is Kokoro's late father, who died when she was young.
Keiko Nishimura (西村桂子, Nishimura Keiko)
Voiced by: Sachiko Yoda
Keiko is Kokoro's maternal grandmother, who lives with her husband, daughter, and granddaughter.
Makoto Nishimura (西村誠, Nishimura Makoto)
Makoto is Kokoro's maternal grandfather, who lives with his wife, daughter, and granddaughter.

=== Hanamichi Town residents ===
Kaito Hibiki (響カイト, Hibiki Kaito) / Cure Connect (キュアコネクト, Kyua Konekuto)
Voiced by: Daisuke Sakuma
Kaito is a "legendary" idol who is loved by everyone and popular worldwide. After going on hiatus to study singing abroad, he meets the Cures while visiting Cafe Glitter and helps Uta serve customers. Episode 37 reveals that he was Kazuma's friend until he passed the idol audition rather than Kazuma, after which they have not seen each other since they graduated junior high and Kaito left town to debut as an idol. Since then, he has been singing in hopes that it reaches Kazuma, regretting not chasing after him when he had the chance. Jogi transforms him into a Darkranda, but he is saved by Uta and realizes that she is Cure Idol. In episode 42, he transforms into Cure Connect through his feelings to reach Kazuma and purifies Jogi with Legend Echo, returning him to his original self as Kazuma, after which they reconcile and decide to be idols together.
Renji Jo (城蓮司, Jō Renji)
Voiced by: Tomomichi Nishimura (Episode 1–33 and 45), Riki Kagami (Episode 34 onwards)
Renji is a regular customer of Cafe Glitter who is known as Old Man Ren (れんじいちゃん, Renjīchan).
Ema Komiya (小宮絵真, Komiya Ema)
Voiced by: Akiha Matsui
Ema is a manga artist and customer of Cafe Glitter who is the first to be turned into a Makkuranda by Cutty.
Kurikyuta (くりきゅうた)
Voiced by: Masaaki Yano (Note: Masaaki Yano was uncredited for his role as Kurikyuta until the final episode)
Kurikyuta is a sumo wrestler who Uta mistakes for being a Pretty Cure due to their names sounding similar. In Episode 33, he sends a fan letter to the Idol Pretty Cure, befriending them while requesting that they help him become a Pretty Cure, as he wants to quit sumo after getting injured. However, despite encouragement from the Cures and Chikara, he still wants to quit, leading to Jogi transforming him into a Darkranda. After the Cures save him, he regains the confidence to keep being a sumo wrestler and thanks them and Chikara for their support.
Chikara (力)
Voiced by: Mayuko Kazama
Chikara is a fan of Kurikyuta. After learning that Kurikyuta is going to quit sumo, Chikara tells him not to give up, because Kurikyuta inspired him. After Kurikyuta regains his confidence, Chikara is overjoyed to know that his support has encouraged Kurikyuta to keep being a sumo wrestler.
Mikoto Higashinaka (東中 みこと, Higashinaka Mikoto)
Voiced by: Natsumi Murakami
Mikoto is Uta's best friend and classmate, who is a fan of Cure Idol and member of the Cure Idol and Cure Wink Research Club.
Wakaba Shinbashi (新橋わかば, Shinbashi Wakaba) & Ruka Sakaue (坂上るか, Sakaue Ruka)
Voiced by: Mayuko Kazama (Wakaba) & Mariko Higashiuchi (Ruka)
Wakaba and Ruka are Uta and Nana's classmates who are members of the Cure Idol and Cure Wink Research Club.
Odoru Sunda (寸田躍, Sunda Odoru)
Voiced by: Akihiro Shinohara, Risae Matsuda (young)
Odoru is Kokoro's classmate and childhood friend. He has known Kokoro since they were in elementary school and invites her to join the Dancing Club due to her talent, but she rejects his invitation. When Zakkuri transforms him into a Makkuranda, Kokoro becomes Cure Kyun-Kyun to save him.
Mio Nino (新野みお, Nīno Mio)
Voiced by: Yuko Iida
Mio is a member of the Broadcasting Club.
Shōta (翔太)
Voiced by: Yusuke Shirai
Shota is member of Hanamichi Junior High School's volleyball team, who the female students look up to.
Fujino (藤野)
Voiced by: Takuma Nagatsuka
Fujino is a member of Hanamichi Junior High School's volleyball team. Her classmates believe that he may be Wakaba's next love interest after he congratulates Wakaba on her team's victory.
Chiyo Kai (甲斐ちよ, Kai Chiyo)
Voiced by: Chinatsu Akasaki
Chiyo is a student and representative of Class 2-C running for student council president who vows to abolish the Idol Pretty Cure Research Club as part of her campaign, refusing to change her mind despite Kokoro's efforts. When Kokoro decides to run for student council president, Chiyo takes it in stride and is confident she will still win. Upon noticing Kokoro staying after school, Chiyo offers her umbrella to Kokoro and runs out into the rain despite not having a spare umbrella. On the day of the final speeches, Chiyo is feeling anxious as she realizes Kokoro is more popular than her, and Chokkirine transforms her into a Darkranda. After being purified, Chiyo is shocked when Kokoro announces she is dropping out of the election and declares she is supporting Chiyo, making Chiyo the winner of the election by default. Some time later, Chiyo visits the research club and announces she supports them and the Idol Pretty Cure, revealing herself to be a fan of Cure Kyun-Kyun.
Fujimi (富士見先生)
Voiced by: Yoshiyuki Shimozuma
Fujimi is Uta and Nana's homeroom teacher.
Koharu Mori (森こはる, Mori Koharu)
Voiced by: Mayuko Kazama
Koharu is the manager of Pretty Holic who is in charge of advertising. She helps the Cures overcome their nerves while overseeing production on a photoshoot for a commercial for a Pretty Holic spring lipstick campaign promoting a new store opening in Hanamichi Town.
Hanami (はなみ)
Hanami is the squirrel-like mascot of Hanamichi Town who Nana met as a child when it gave her a balloon.
Miyu (みゆ)
Voiced by: Fuka Miyako
Miyu is a girl who is a fan of Cure Kyun-Kyun and goes to the handshake event with her mother. Cutty transforms them into a Makkuranda, but they are saved by the Cures, after which she is able to meet Cure Kyun-Kyun.
Alice (アリス, Arisu)
Voiced by: Aina Suzuki
Alice is a girl who Meroron meets before she reunites with her mother.
Tsumugu Kijima (貴島つむぐ, Kijima Tsumugu)
Voiced by: Risae Matsuda
Tsumugu is the journalist for the magazine Entertainment Vroo-Vroom.
Jou (ジョウ) & Kii (キイ)
Voiced by: Satoshi Inomata (Jou) & Yuko Iida (Kii)
Jou and Kii are a couple who debuted in episode 15. They are preparing to pledge their love with the Heart Kirari Locks when Cutty transforms them into a Kurayaminda, but they are saved by the Idol Pretty Cure. In episode 30, Jogi transforms them into Darkranda after they get into an argument, but they reconcile after being saved by the Cures.
Maruyama (丸山)
Voiced by: Toshihiro Arisawa
Maruyama is a TV programme producer who appeared in episode 23. He introduces one of his staff members to Hibiki Kaito and Cure Idol before leaving with his staff member, who has her autograph signed by Idol.
Mei (メイ)
Voiced by: Mariko Higashiuchi
Mei is a fan of Kaito.
Hanae Natsuno (夏野はなえ, Natsuno Hanae)
Voiced by: Aino Shimada
Hanae is the owner of the sunflower fields in Hanamichi Town.
Daisuke Utsurigi (宇釣木大輔, Utsurigi Daisuke)
Voiced by: Hiroshi Watanabe
Daisuke is Uta and Nana's classmate, who falls in love with Uta after seeing her in CureTube videos and sends her a letter to meet her in person. Chokkirine transforms him into a Kurayaminda, but he is saved by the Cures, after which he comes to admire the Cures instead.
Iku Mochida (持田いく, Mochida Iku)
Voiced by: Shuhei Matsuda
Iku is the P.E. teacher of Hanamichi Middle School.
Hiroshi Owarai (小原井ヒロシ, Owarai Hiroshi)
Voiced by: Kosuke Takaguchi
Hiroshi is a comedian who used to live in Hanamichi Town. As Cafe Glitter's former regular number two customer, after being inspired by Kazu's one-liner gag on the old morning menu twenty years ago, he left for the city to pursue his dream of becoming a comedian. Having accomplished his dream, now 42 years old, he returns to Hanamichi Town hoping to thank Kazu, but is transformed into a Darkranda by Chokkirine. After he is saved by the Cures and goes to Cafe Glitter with Hamori, he reveals the crossed-out item and listens to Uta's song happily afterwards.
Mawaru Sunda (寸田周, Sunda Mawaru)
Voiced by: Yōhei Tadano
Mawaru is Odoru's grandfather, who taught him about spin dancing and that smiling makes the crowd happy too, and founded the Dancing Star Cup, believing dance would save the world. When Mawaru was younger, he travelled around the world and discovered he could communicate with foreign people through the art of spin dancing.

=== Others ===
==== Dancing Star Pretty Cure ====
Gaku Hoshikawa (星河楽, Hoshikawa Gaku) / Cure Top (キュアトップ, Kyua Toppu)
Voiced by: Shogo Tamura
The main protagonist of Dancing Star Pretty Cure The Stage. Gaku is an energetic 17-year-old second-year high school student. He is passionate about dancing and dreams of becoming a regular in the dance club, as well as winning the national championship. Gaku is considerate of what to say, so he tends to correct himself to be appropriate, because he is quick to jumping to conclusions. After meeting Pas de Deux, he transforms into Cure Top. His dance theme is hip-hop, his element is stars, and his theme color is pink.

Hayato Natsume (夏目颯斗, Natsume Hayato) / Cure Lock (キュアロック, Kyua Rokku)
Voiced by: Ryo Takizawa
Hayato is an attentive and supportive 17-year-old second-year high school student and Gaku's best friend. He is more serious, hardworking, and diligent about dancing, sharing Gaku's dream of becoming a regular in the dance club. Despite this, Hayato struggles with low self-esteem, being sensitive to the words of others, and the idea of not being perfect, often comparing himself with Gaku. After nearly being consumed by despair and being saved by Gaku, he transforms into Cure Lock to save him. His dance theme is locking, his element is water, and his theme color is blue.

Sasana Tsukimiya (月宮爽々奈, Tsukimiya Sasana) / Cure Soul (キュアソウル, Kyua Souru)
Voiced by: Touya Morita
Sasana is a charismatic, passionate, and broad-minded 18-year-old third-year high school student, as well as the president of the dance club. Sasana tends to act mischievous and sensual towards other male students, but also likes to give others advice. He has a close relationship and friendship with Kouga, as they live together in the mansion of Sasana's parents and have been Cures longer than the other boys. When he met Kouga, both were at the brink of despair, in his case due to not receiving love from his parents, but after reassuring each other, they transformed into Cure Soul and Cure Kagura thanks to Pas de Deux. His dance theme is soul dance, his element is light, and his theme color is yellow.

Kouga Tengen (天弦晃雅, Tengen Kouga) / Cure Kagura (キュアカグラ, Kyua Kagura)
Voiced by: Raiga Terasaka
Kouga is a strict and grumpy 18-year-old third-year high school student, as well as the vice president of the dance club. He has a close relationship and friendship with Sasana, as they live together in the mansion of Sasana's parents and have been Cures longer than the other boys. Kouga tends to act harsh towards others he cares about and is not good at expressing his feelings, leading to a conflict with his former teammate, Cure Break, that makes him reluctant to later work with Cure Top and Cure Lock, until they are able to become friends again. When he met Sasana, both were at the border of despair, in his case due to being rejected by his father and being bullied due to his liking for more feminine things and his "female like" appearance, but after reassuring each other, they transformed into Cure Kagura and Cure Soul thanks to Pas de Deux. His dance theme is the ceremonial kagura dance, his element is wind, and his theme color is green.

Maito Kurose (黒瀬舞人, Kurose Maito) / Cure Break (キュアブレイク, Kyua Bureiku)
Voiced by: Iori Kotsuji
Maito is a shy, rebellious, and disinterested 16-year-old first-year high school student. Maito did not have friends, as he is socially awkward. He used to go to the same middle school as Gaku and Hayato, transforming into Cure Break after entering high school, sometime after Sasana and Kouga but before Gaku and Hayato. He frequently fought with other students, even fighting and breaking apart with Sasana and Kouga when the three used to be a team due to a fight with Kouga. This led to Maito quitting the dance club, but after befriending Gaku and Hayato, he makes amends with Kouga. His dance theme is breakdancing, his element is lightning, and his theme color is purple.

Pas De Deux (パドドゥ, Pa Do Du)
Voiced by: Shinichi Wago
The fairy and mascot of the Dancing Star Pretty Cure. Pas De Deux is a fairy claiming to come from the realm of Hope Beat to stop a group of villains known as Desperade, giving the Cures their Stellar Brace, which they use to transform. He loves pancakes and can transform into a human form that "looks like a strange old guy doing cosplay". He is confident and prideful, getting easily annoyed when he is ignored. His dance theme is ballet, as he is named after the pas de deux, and his theme color is orange.

==== Star Detective Precure! ====
Anna Akechi (明智あんな, Akechi An'na) / Cure Answer (キュアアンサー, Kyua Ansā)
Voiced by: Hikari Senga
The protagonist of Star Detective Precure!.

Pochitan (ポチタン)
Voiced by: Emiri Kato
A koala-like fairy from Star Detective Precure!.

=== Movie characters ===
Totto (トット)
Voiced by: Atsuhiro Tsuda
Totto is the coral fairy of AiAi Island.
Tera (テラ)
Voiced by: Maaya Uchida
Tera is a fragment of the AiAi Island goddess, Amasu who dislikes idols and holds the key to the island's secrets.
Amasu (アマス)
Voiced by: Ayane Sakura
Amasu is the goddess of AiAi Island and the main antagonist of the movie.

Utako (うたこ)
Voiced by: Misato Matsuoka
A legendary Idol that once visited AiAi Island a long time ago.

== Production ==
The series' trademark was confirmed by Toei in late November 2024, with the official website launching the next day. Later that December, the character's designs and names were leaked through a listing on Mercari, which was taken down shortly afterwards. The series was officially revealed on January 4, 2025.

== Media ==
=== Anime ===
You and Idol Pretty Cure premiered on February 2, 2025, on Japan's ANN stations, replacing Wonderful Pretty Cure! in its timeslot. The opening theme, "You and Idol Pretty Cure Light Up!" (Japanese: キミとアイドルプリキュア♪ Light Up!, Hepburn: Kimi to Aidoru Purikuya Light Up!; You and Idol Pretty Cure♪Light Up!), is performed by Ami Ishii, Chihaya Yoshitake, and Akane Kumada. The first ending theme is titled "Trio Dreams", is performed by Misato Matsuoka, Minami Takahashi, and Natsumi Takamori as their characters while the second ending theme is titled, "LuLaLa With You" (キミとルララ, Kimi to LuLaLa) performed by Matsuoka, Takahashi, Takamori, Yoshino Nanjo and Miharu Hanai as their characters.

=== Films ===
A film based on the anime series, You and Idol Pretty Cure the Movie: For You! Our Kirakilala Concert! (映画キミとアイドルプリキュア♪ お待たせ！キミに届けるキラッキライブ！, Eiga Kimi to Aidoru Purikyua ♪ Omatase! Kimi ni Todokeru Kirakiraibu!) was announced on April 19, 2025. It was released on September 12, 2025, and features the Cures from the two previous series, Wonderful Pretty Cure! and Soaring Sky! Pretty Cure.

Star Detective Precure! The Movie: The Mysterious Garden and a Secret Pair (映画名探偵プリキュア！不思議な庭と2人の秘密, Eiga Meitantei Purikyua! Fushigina niwa to 2-ri no himitsu) was released on September 18, 2026.

=== Music ===
==== Openings ====
Song	Artist	Episodes
"You and Idol Precure Light Up!" (キミとアイドルプリキュア♪ Light Up!)	Ami Ishii, Chihaya Yoshitake & Akane Kumada	1–49
"You and Idol Precure Light Up! ReMix for You and Idol Precure♪" (キミとアイドルプリキュア♪ Light Up！ ReMix for You and Idol Precure♪)	Cure Idol (Misato Matsuoka), Cure Wink (Minami Takahashi), Cure Kyun-Kyun (Natsumi Takamori), Cure Zukyoon (Yoshino Nanjō), Cure Kiss (Miharu Hanai)	31–33

==== Endings ====
Song	Artist	Episodes
"Trio Dreams"	Cure Idol (Misato Matsuoka), Cure Wink (Minami Takahashi), Cure Kyun-Kyun (Natsumi Takamori)	1 – 21, 47
"Lulala With You" (キミとルララ)	Cure Idol (Misato Matsuoka), Cure Wink (Minami Takahashi), Cure Kyun-Kyun (Natsumi Takamori), Cure Zukyoon (Yoshino Nanjō), Cure Kiss (Miharu Hanai)	22 – 46, 48 – 49
"HiBiKi Au Uta"	Cure Idol (Misato Matsuoka), Cure Wink (Minami Takahashi), Cure Kyun-Kyun (Natsumi Takamori), Cure Zukyoon (Yoshino Nanjō), Cure Kiss (Miharu Hanai)	32–34

==== Insert Songs ====
A CD single containing the debut songs for the characters Cure Idol, Cure Wink, and Cure Kyun-Kyun was released on February 26, 2025. The CD single ranked 24th on Oricon's weekly single chart within its first week of release.

Song	Artist	Episodes
"Unison of Smiles" (笑顔のユニゾン♪)	Cure Idol (Misato Matsuoka)	1 – 2, 4, 6, 28, 48
"Winking Score" (まばたきの五線譜)	Cure Wink (Minami Takahashi)	3, 5, 9, 25
"Heart Revolution" (ココロレボリューション)	Cure Kyun-Kyun (Natsumi Takamori)	7 – 8, 10, 26
"Awakening Harmony"	Cure Zukyoon (Yoshino Nanjō), Cure Kiss (Miharu Hanai)	17–22
"Singing Ribbon With You" (キミとシンガリボン)	Cure Idol (Misato Matsuoka), Cure Wink (Minami Takahashi), Cure Kyun-Kyun (Natsumi Takamori), Cure Zukyoon (Yoshino Nanjō), Cure Kiss (Miharu Hanai)	30–49

== See also ==
- Super Hero Time and Nichi Asa Kids Time – The timeslot blocks by ANN in Japan, which the series is part of.

== Notes ==
Preceded by Wonderful Pretty Cure!	You and Idol PreCure; 2025–2026	Succeeded by Star Detective Precure!
