= Star Detective Precure! =

Japanese anime television series

- Promotional poster
- Japanese: 名探偵プリキュア！
- Revised Hepburn: Meitantei Purikyua!
- Genre: Magical girl; Time travel; Detective fiction
- Created by: Izumi Todo
- Directed by: Koji Kawasaki
- Series composition: Isao Murayama
- Character designer: Akane Yano
- Music by: Erika Fukasawa; Misaki Umase
- Country of origin: Japan
- Original language: Japanese
- No. of episodes: 42 (list of episodes)

Production
- Art director: Eiji Hamano
- Cinematographer: Yoshiyuki Anzai
- Color designer: Satoshi Takezawa
- Editor: Yoshihiro Āso
- Producers: Shōko Hirata (ABC TV); Tada Kanako (ABC-A); Rika Tone (ADK EM); Masaya Aramaki
- Production companies: ABC Television; ABC Animation; ADK Emotions; Toei Animation

Original release
- Networks: ANN (ABC TV, TV Asahi)
- Release: February 1, 2026 – present

Related
- Anime film
- Star Detective Precure! The Movie: The Mysterious Garden and a Secret Pair (2026)

Star Detective Precure! (Japanese: 名探偵プリキュア！, Hepburn: Meitantei Purikyua!) is a Japanese anime television series produced by Toei Animation and the twenty-third installment in the Pretty Cure franchise by Izumi Todo. The series is directed by Koji Kawasaki, written by Isao Murayama and character designed by Akane Yano. It began airing on all ANN stations in Japan from February 1, 2026, succeeding You and Idol Precure's timeslot. The series' main themes are mysteries and time-traveling, while its motif is detectives. It is the second time the Pretty Cure series has included Kanji in its title.

== Story ==
Anna Akechi is a 14-year-old second-year middle school student living in Makoto Mirai Town. On her birthday, guided by the fairy Pochitan and a pendant she finds in her room, she time-slips from 2027 to Makoto Mirai City in 1999. There, she meets Mikuru Kobayashi, a 14-year-old girl who dreams of becoming a detective. Suddenly, a robbery incident occurs, as someone has something precious to them stolen. Figuring that the "Phantom Thieves' Guild" may be responsible and driven by the feeling that "I can't ignore someone in trouble", Anna and Mikuru transform into Cure Answer and Cure Mystique. Together, they become the Star Detective Precure, running the "CUREtto Detective Agency" (キュアット探偵事務所, Kyuatto Tantei Jimusho) while solving mysteries and searching for a way for Anna to return to her original time.

== Characters ==
=== Precures ===
Anna Akechi (明智あんな, Akechi An'na) / Cure Answer (キュアアンサー, Kyua Ansā)
Voiced by: Hikari Senga
The main protagonist of the series. Anna is a second-year middle school girl who time-slipped from the year 2027 to 1999. Anna has a straightforward and honest personality and simply wants to help, as she cannot ignore people in trouble. Rather than thinking things through at length, Anna tends to rely on gut instincts and intuition to reach answers. After arriving in Makoto Mirai City in 1999, Anna meets Mikuru, and they begin living together while running the CUREtto Detective Agency. Her theme color is purple.
Mikuru Kobayashi (小林みくる, Kobayashi Mikuru) / Kumi Hanasaki (花崎来未, Hanasaki Kumi) / Cure Mystique (キュアミスティック, Kyua Misutikku)
Voiced by: Kaede Hondo
Mikuru, whose real name is Kumi Hanasaki, is a clumsy yet honest second-year middle school student from 1999–2000, who joined the CUREtto Detective Agency in Makoto Mirai City with the goal of becoming a star detective just like her grandmother, Mafuru Hanasaki. She has plenty of detective knowledge and works harder than anyone else. Rather than relying on gut instincts and intuition thinking, Mikuru prefers to think things through at length to reach answers. She loves cute things more than anything. Her theme color is pink.
Kurea Howa (帆羽くれあ, Howa Kurea) / Cure Eclair (キュアエクレール, Kyua Ekurēru)
Voiced by: Ikumi Hasegawa
Kurea is a pastry chef at Patisserie ChuChu. Having worked in customer service, she is skilled at interacting with and listening to various people and possesses excellent insight. When it comes to desserts, she prioritizes talking to customers and understanding what kind they want. Her thought process is driven by her impulsive nature, following people's "inspiration" and "truth". In episode 25, she is revealed to be the amnesiac Cure Eclair, a mysterious Precure known as "The Blue Butterfly" who was formerly Luluka's partner and assistant. In the past, after transforming into Cure Eclair for the first time, she stopped Usonoir from stealing the giant Makoto Jewel at the cost of exhausting her powers. This resulted in her losing her memories and Usonoir stealing her Makoto Jewel, with Luluka having joined the Phantom Thieves' Guild to get it back. She later regains her memories and is resurrected as Cure Eclair. As Eclair, she possesses immense strength and speed, but becomes dizzy after overexerting herself. Luluka believed that Eclair is the prophesized Great King, but she does not cause the world to be enveloped in lies. Instead, the prophecy about the world being enveloped in lies was actually about Luluka's world being enveloped in a lie. Though kind, personable, and gentle, she has a strong will and can be pushy. She is the type who finds answers with keen insight and intuition, and cherishes her own "sparkle." Her theme color is blue.
Luluka Moria (森亜るるか, Moria Ruruka) / Cure Arcana (キュアアルカナ, Kyua Arukana) / Cure Arcana Shadow (キュアアルカナ・シャドウ, Kyua Arukana Shadō) / Eclipse Shadow (エクリプス・シャドウ, Ekuripusu Shadō)
Voiced by: Nao Tōyama
Luluka is a mysterious girl, who was a former human member of the Phantom Thieves. Luluka has a laid-back personality and does not conform to stereotypes. She does not say much, but has a passionate side to her that she hides within. Her favorite food is ice cream. She first confronts her rivals Answer and Mystique during a heist at the Hosho Art Museum to steal the Starlight Princess, during which she helps them fight Ageseine's Hanninda created from the Starlight Princess. She is later revealed to have been a former Star Detective of the Agency's Japanese branch known as Cure Arcana, who now seeks Pochitan's power. However, it is revealed that Usonoir forced Luluka and Mashutan to join the Guild against their will, as he stole Cure Eclair's Makoto Jewel and blackmailed her into serving him if she wants it back. She then received power from Decchi Agein, becoming Cure Arcana Shadow. During the battle against Usonoir on July 19, 1999, she temporarily joins forces with the Cures after deciding that Usonoir has gone too far by using the power of Cure Eclair's Makoto Jewel to destroy the world. After Usonoir's defeat, she vows to defeat Cure Eclair so that she can take back her Makoto Jewel and destroy it, or else there will never be a future for the Guild. In episode 30, she gains a more evil form known as Eclipse Shadow from Decchi in order to defeat Cure Eclair. In episode 31, Cure Eclair is able to get through to Luluka, who is purified from her dark powers and reconciles with Kurea after realizing that her true desire was to be with her. Afterwards, Luluka defects from the Guild permanently and rejoins the Star Detectives in their battle against the Guild as Cure Arcana once again. Her theme color is black as Arcana Shadow and white as Arcana.

=== Fairies ===
Jett (ジェット, Jetto)
Voiced by: Yuki Kaji
Jett is a 222-year-old cat-like fairy and self-proclaimed genius private scientist and a mentor, who invented the PreKit and supports the Star Detective Precure as their mentor. He is embarrassed to be seen in his fairy form, so he often appears in the form of a 12 year old young boy. Despite this, Jett is a kind and caring fairy whom the girls adore, calling him "Jett-senpai" (ジェット先輩, Jetto-senpai). Jett's favorite things are candy and sweet things in general. Unlike the other fairies, he does not end his sentences with a suffix.
Pochitan (ポチタン)
Voiced by: Emiri Kato
Pochitan is a panda-like fairy and Anna and Mikuru's fairy partner. A "space-time fairy" with the ability to transcend time and space, Pochitan used up all her power by time traveling and turned into a baby. If all the Makoto Jewels are collected, Pochitan may be able to return to her original form and return Anna to 2027. She loves fun things and has a childlike personality. Pochitan's favorite drink is milk. She ends her sentences with "pochi".
Shushutan (シュシュタン)
Voiced by: Karin Isobe
Shushutan is a tanuki-like fairy and Kurea's fairy partner, who was disguised as her scrunchie until she regained her memories. A "knowledge fairy" who loves Kurea very much, but can come across as quite clingy. Her favorite food is cream puffs. She ends her sentences with "shu".
Mashutan (マシュタン)
Voiced by: Hina Yōmiya
Mashutan is a fox-like fairy and Luluka's fairy partner, who was formerly the mascot of the Phantom Thieves' Guild. A "fortune-telling fairy" who can accurately predict anything through her fortune-telling. Mashutan has a strong bond with Cure Arcana Shadow/Cure Arcana. She loves fashion and has an overly helpful personality. Mashutan's favorite food is marshmallows. She ends her sentences with "mashu".
Shinian (シニアン)
Voiced by: Ai Orikasa
Shinian is an elderly cat-like fairy and Jett's mentor.

=== Phantom Thieves' Guild ===
The Phantom Thieves' Guild (怪盗団ファントム, Kaitou-dan Fantomu) are the main antagonists of the series. A group of evil fairies taking human form and led by Usonoir, their main goal is to create a terrifying "world" blanketed in lies by exploiting the Makoto Jewels, crystallized feelings that dwell within objects people hold dear. Disguising themselves as various individuals, they secretly steal treasured possessions and the smiles connected to them without anyone noticing. In episode 31, their members are later revealed to be known as the Forgotten Race after being forgotten by humans and fairies.

==== Leaders ====
Usonoir (ウソノワール, Usonowāru)
Voiced by: Satoshi Hino
Usonoir is the leader of the Phantom Thieves' Guild and the main antagonist of the series. He is an evil dog-like fairy who acts through a suit of armor, acting according to the prophecies written in the Tome of Mirages (未来自由(ミラージュ)の書). His aesthetic is that theft is magnificent, elegant, and dramatic, with the Guild's hideout resembling a theater reflecting his hobby. During his battle with the Cures on July 19, 1999, Usonoir absorbs Cure Eclair's Makoto Jewel in order to envelop the world in lies, transforming into a giant monster. However, he goes berserk as a result of the Makoto Jewel resisting from within him, before being defeated by Cure Eclair. Following his defeat, he is currently stuck in his fairy form after his armor was confiscated by Jett for analysis. In episode 37, it is revealed that he, unlike other fairies, cannot transform into a human. His subordinates address him as Maestro Usonoir (ウソノワール様, Usonowāru-sama), while Decchi addresses him as Usocchi (ウソッチ)).

==== Generals ====
Underlings of Usonoir. They use different methods to steal objects that contain a Makoto Jewel; Nijee, Ageseine, and Decchi disguise themselves as someone else to steal the object unnoticed, Goemon takes the object by force, and Luluka disguises herself using the Pre-Kit Gloss to steal the object unnoticed. They possess the ability to corrupt a Makoto Jewel and transform it into a Hanninda by throwing a flower at the object they stole, taking away peoples' happiness. With the exception of Luluka, they are named after various criminals. They have bat wings on their body and wear a mask on their left eye. As well, with the exception of Luluka and Decchi, they have a star shape in their eyes, proving that they are fairies. If they fail too many times, they will be sent to the trap room as punishment.

Nijee (ニジー, Nijii)
Voiced by: Yoshitsugu Matsuoka
Nijee is the first general of the Phantom Thieves' Guild to attack. A pretentious general who always carries a rose, he is a master of disguise and prefers to steal things in an elegant manner. He is based on "The Fiend with Twenty Faces" (怪人二十面相, Kaitō Nijū Mensō).
Ageseine (アゲセーヌ, Agesēnu)
Voiced by: Ayaka Ōhashi
Ageseine is the second general and only female of the Phantom Thieves' Guild to attack. A gyaru general who loves trendy things. Her favorite flower is the hibiscus, and her favorite phrases are "This is so wack" (チョベリバ, Choberiba) and "That is gonna fly" (チョベリグ, Choberigu). She is based on "Arsène Lupin", a gentleman thief and master of disguise, while her name is derived from "ageage" (アゲアゲ), meaning "excited" and "elated".
Goemon (ゴウエモン, Gouemon)
Voiced by: Eiichi Ishikawa
Goemon is the third general of the Phantom Thieves' Guild to attack. A muscular, stylish, and cool general who takes it upon himself to help train any newcomers. Unlike Nijee and Ageseine, Goemon prefers to steal things by force instead of using disguises. His favorite food is dorayaki and his favorite flower is the cherry blossom petals. He sometimes challenges the Cures to solve mysteries, altering dimensions by placing his fan on the ground; after they solve his puzzles, he sends a Hanninda to fight them. He is based on Goemon Ishikawa, a bandit leader of Japan's Azuchi-Momoyama period.
Decchi Agein (デッチ・アゲイン, Decchi・Agein)
Voiced by: Kōhei Amasaki
Decchi is the secondary antagonist of the series. He is a general of the Phantom Thieves' Guild who came from London to attack. A cool and mysterious general who possesses the ability to transcend time and space and can retrieve Makoto Jewels by using his monocle. He has an unprecedented method of using a calling card with a mysterious pattern and a specific time limit written down in seconds. He acts like a stage director and is also an old acquaintance of Usonoir, with them calling each other "Decchi" and "Usocchi". Additionally, he is the one responsible for Cure Arcana Shadow's birth after granting her power. He later returns back to London to invade the CUREtto Detective Agency, which he successfully did, sending Usonoir a letter revealing that it has fallen.

==== Monsters ====
Hanninda (ハンニンダー)
Voiced by: Shinnosuke Musashi
The main monsters of the series. They are created from the corrupted Makoto Jewels. Their name is derived from Hanni (犯人, Han'nin), meaning culprit.

=== Cures' Family Members ===
Mafuru Hanasaki (花咲まふる, Hanasaki Mafuru)
Voiced by: Miki Nagasawa
Mafuru is the head of the CUREtto Detective Agency in London and Mikuru's grandmother. She once recommended the detective test to Kurea and Luluka, and requested that they become Star Detective Precure. She is known for solving the "Lost Crown Case" that shook all of England. She is also known as the "Proof of Dawn" (暁の証明), and her catchphrase is "Amazing!" (アメイジング！).

=== Makoto Mirai City residents ===
Eliza Kurusu (来栖エリザ, Kurusu Eriza)
Voiced by: Riko Akechi
Eliza is a mystery novelist who is currently in high school. She seeks help from the Cures to search for her missing glass pen.
Yoriko Henmi (辺見頼子, Henmi Yoriko)
Voiced by: Natsuki Aikawa
Yoriko is Eliza's editor, whose identity was assumed by Ageseine to steal her cellphone.
Taira Asai (浅井たいら, Asai Taira)
Voiced by: Takehiro Hasu
Taira is the owner of Patisserie ChuChu, who likes Japanese sweets.
Shiruku Ieiri (家入しるく, Ieiri Shiruku)
Voiced by: Natsumi Murakami
Shiruku is a popular up-and-coming new Heisei actor in Makoto Mirai City.
Mari Sohda (想田まり, Souda Mari)
Voiced by: Yumika Yano
Mari is the first client of the CUREtto Detective Agency. She seeks help from the Cures to search for the missing tiara, which her mother had previously worn at her wedding and which she had planned to wear at her wedding.
Tomoka Fujii (藤井ともか, Fujii Tomoka)
Voiced by: Fū Hirohara
Tomoka is a friend of Mari, whose identity was assumed by Nijee to steal the tiara.
Shota Utsunomiya (宇都宮将太, Utsunomiya Shōta)
Voiced by: Naoki Kimiya
Shota is a photographer who came to photograph Mari Soda's wedding. He later seeks help from the Cures to find his missing camera. However, it turns out that his identity was assumed by Ageseine, who had stolen his camera.
Taizo Yamada (山田太造, Yamada Taizō)
Voiced by: Naoki Kimiya
Taizo is an office worker who was at the place where the thieving old lady was hiding. His identity was later assumed by Ageseine, who had stolen Yoriko's cellphone.
Minoru Akita (秋田実, Akita Minoru) & Suzumi Natsukawa (夏川涼美, Natsukawa Suzumi)
Voiced by: Akihiro Shinohara (Minoru) & Momo Harumi (Suzumi)
Akita and Suzumi are a couple from Makoto Mirai City.
Harue Tanimoto (谷本晴恵, Tanimoto Harue)
Voiced by: Kaede Yuasa
Harue is a Heisei gal, whose identity was assumed by Nijee to steal the glass pen.
Chiho Maeda (前田ちほ, Maeda Chiho)
Voiced by: Ayaka Shimizu
Chiho is the owner of the Kamellia Interior, who seeks help from the Cures to search for the missing turtle figurine.
Takuya Nakategawa (仲手川卓也, Nakategawa Takuya)
Voiced by: Toya Shiraishi
Takuya is the clerk of the Kamellia Interior, whose identity was assumed by Ageseine to steal the turtle figurine.
Junichi Komatsuzaki (小松崎純一, Komatsuzaki Junichi)
Voiced by: Gen Satō
Junichi is a university student aspiring to be a manga artist. He seeks help from the Cures to search for his missing bag, which contains his manga drafts.
Mariko Kitamura (北村真理子, Kitamura Mariko)
Voiced by: Yumika Yano
Mariko is a university student who seeks help from Anna to search for her sister, Keiko.
Morio Hanamori (花森もりお, Hanamori Morio)
Voiced by: Akihiro Shinohara
Morio is a florist, whose identity was assumed by Nijee to steal Jett's goggles.
Tomoki Sakakibara (榊原ともき, Sakakibara Tomoki)
Voiced by: Junichi Yanagita
Tomoki is a producer, whose identity was assumed by Ageseine to steal the dress.
Moe Saiki (斉木萌絵, Saiki Moe)
Voiced by: Yuri Fujiwara
Moe is a client who seeks help from the Cures to investigate her mother's self-portrait.
Shigezo Furuya (古屋茂三, Furuya Shigezō)
Voiced by: Ikkyu Juku
Shigezo is the owner of the Hanrai-do Bookstore, who seeks help from the Cures to find his missing gold medal that he had won at a darts tournament.
Chinami Hosho (宝生ちなみ, Hōshō Chinami)
Voiced by: Ayumi Tsunematsu
Chinami is the owner of the Hosho Art Museum, who seeks help from the Cures to protect her museum displays, namely the Starlight Princess, a necklace. However, after it is exposed that the museum's displays are fake and the truth is revealed to the public, she decides to display the real Starlight Princess. Nijee later assumed her identity to steal the glass slipper exhibit, Lost at Midnight.
Reiji (れいじ)
Voiced by: Kaede Yuasa
Reiji is a young client who seeks help from the Cures to find his missing Guruminger's Robot Doll.
Kotarou Akayama (赤山虎太郎, Akayama Kotarou)
Voiced by: Minami Hinata
Kotaro is a young client who seeks help from the Cures to find his missing pet cat, Miko.
Ikue Meguro (目黒郁恵, Meguro Ikue)
Voiced by: Kaede Yuasa
Ikue is a makeup artist who seeks help from the Cures to protect her airline ticket to Paris.
Megumi Minamino (南野めぐみ, Minamino Megumi)
Voiced by: Momo Harumi
Megumi is a young customer at Patisserie ChuChu who seeks help from the Cures to find the missing sunglasses, which were a birthday present from her boyfriend.
Eisaku Hamada (浜田栄作, Hamada Eisaku)
Voiced by: Naoki Kimiya
Eisaku is a customer at Patisserie ChuChu whose identity was assumed by Nijee to steal the sunglasses.
Ume Takematsu (竹松梅, Takematsu Ume)
Voiced by: Saeko Akiho
Ume is an old lady whose identity was assumed by Nijee to steal the gold medal.
Haruna Makifusa (牧房春菜, Makifusa Haruna)
Voiced by: Yumika Yano
Haruna is a high school student whose identity was assumed by Mafuru, in order to meet with the Cures and warn them about the London CUREtto Detective Agency being invaded by Decchi Agein. She also assists them in investigating the theft of the gold medal.
Hinano (ひなの)
Voiced by: Aika Wakuno
Hinano is a young client who seeks help from the Cures to reunite with her mother.

=== Makoto Mirai Academy ===
Keiko Kitamura (北村恵子, Kitamura Keiko)
Voiced by: Momo Harumi
Keiko is Mariko's younger sister and a student from Makoto Mirai Academy, whose identity was assumed by Nijee to steal the swallow statue.
Rei Kaneda (金田れい, Kaneda Rei)
Voiced by: Lynn
Rei is the president of Makoto Mirai Academy's student council.
Rie Asama (浅間りえ, Asama Rie)
Voiced by: Kozue Yūki
Rie is one of Mikuru's classmates from Makoto Mirai Academy. She is known to be a huge enthusiast with a passion for dramas, and her favorite food is Kouign-amann cakes.
Yumi Yoda (依田ゆみ, Yoda Yumi)
Voiced by: Kaede Yuasa
Yumi is one of Mikuru's classmates from Makoto Mirai Academy who is part of the track and field club, where she specializes in high jump. She always carries a MD Player with her.
Momo Kofuji (小藤もも, Kofuji Momo)
Voiced by: Momo Harumi
Momo is a member of the drama club who seeks help from the Cures to search for the club's missing dress.
Mio Iwasaki (岩崎美緒, Iwasaki Mio)
Voiced by: Shino Shimoji
Mio is Kurea and Luluka's classmate from Makoto Mirai Academy's high school section, who seeks help from the Cures to investigate the love letter.

=== Crossover characters ===
Shinichi Kudo (工藤 新一, Kudō Shin'ichi) / Conan Edogawa (江戸川 コナン, Edogawa Konan)
Voiced by: Minami Takayama
The teenage-turned-child detective who lives with the Mouri household under his new name and the main protagonist from Detective Conan.
Ran Mouri (毛利 蘭, Mōri Ran)
Voiced by: Akemi Okamura
Shinichi/Conan's childhood friend from Detective Conan.
Kogoro Mouri (毛利 小五郎, Mōri Kogorō)
Voiced by: Rikiya Koyama
Ran's father and the former police officer who works as the private detective from Detective Conan.

=== Others ===
Paul (ポール, Pōru)
Voiced by: Akinari Sato
Paul is a student from London who seeks help from the Cures to protect the Bisque doll. However, it turns out that his identity was assumed by Decchi, who had stolen the Bisque doll.
Ryan Howard (ライアン・ハワード, Raian Hawādo)
Voiced by: Ryunosuke Watanuki
Ryan is a foreign man who was looking for his paulownia wood box.

=== Movie characters ===
Karin (かりん)
Voiced by: Akari Kitō
A girl who the Cures meet in a mysterious garden. Karin is good at making sweets.
Aran (アラン)
Voiced by: Nobunaga Shimazaki
A Siberian Husky-like fairy who is good friends with Karin. Aran possesses mysterious powers.
Rein (レイン)
Voiced by: Koki Uchiyama
A Siberian Husky-like fairy who has come to the CUREtto Detective Agency to make a request.
Damedame (ダメダメ)
Voiced by: Shinji Nishimura and Kyon
The main antagonists of the movie. They put an "X" mark on all sorts of things, causing trouble for everyone.

== Production ==
The series' trademark was first confirmed by Toei in November 2025, and the official website launched on November 27, 2025. The series was fully revealed on January 11, 2026, along with merchandise related to the series.

Regarding the theme, ABC Animation producer Tada Kanako explained, "We hope the children can find the 'truth' with their hands throughout the journey of this series. In this flood of information and a fast-changing society, don't feel lost, having the will to bridge the future. Respect others, care about others, speak up, and take action. Having their 'true feelings' equals 'the truth'. This is not something easy to do. Star Detective Precure! is a series that makes you think and find 'the truth' through your observation, feelings, and consideration." Soya Aramaki of Toei Animation explained, "Speaking about Detective stories, there is usually one absolutely perfect detective who brilliantly solves difficult cases that no one else has been able to solve. But this time, we deliberately made a novice detective the main character. Nobody can solve a case alone. However, with two of them...if there is a friend by her side, they can solve even the most difficult case! This is not just some ordinary detective story, but a story with girls who never give up, grow together with their friends, and stand up to great evil! This is the kind of Star Detective Precure! we would want to portray."

The series premiered on February 1, 2026, on Japan's ANN stations, replacing You and Idol Precure in its timeslot, with Koji Kawasaki as director, series composition by Isao Murayama, character designs by Akane Yano, and music by Erika Fukusawa and Misaki Umase. The opening theme song is "Hint in the Heart! Star Detective Precure!" (ハートにヒント！名探偵プリキュア！, Hāto ni hinto! Meitantei Purikyua!) by Ami Ishii. The first ending theme song is "Why? Mystery?! Answer" (なぜ？謎？！ANSWER, Naze? Nazo?! Ansā; stylized as "WHY? MYSTERY?! ANSWER"), while the second ending theme song is "We'll Understand Someday☆We'll Surely Meet" (いつかわかる☆きっとあえる, Itsuka Wakaru☆Kitto Aeru), both performed by Akane Kumada and Yūka Masui. Crunchyroll is streaming the series.

== Film ==
In April 2026, Toei Animation announced that the series would receive a film adaptation, with the title later revealed to be Star Detective Precure! The Movie: The Mysterious Garden and a Secret Pair. It was released on September 18, 2026, and features the Cures from the two previous series, You and Idol Precure and Wonderful Precure!.

== See also ==
- Super Hero Time and Nichi Asa Kids Time – The timeslot blocks by ANN in Japan, which the series is part of.

Preceded by You and Idol Precure	Star Detective Precure! 2026-present	Succeeded by -
