= Bothriocephalus =

Scientific classification
- Kingdom: Animalia
- Phylum: Platyhelminthes
- Class: Cestoda
- Order: Bothriocephalidea
- Family: Bothriocephalidae
- Genus: Bothriocephalus; Rudolphi, 1808

Genus of flatworms

Bothriocephalus is a genus of flatworms belonging to the family Bothriocephalidae.

The genus has cosmopolitan distribution.

Species:

- Bothriocephalus alessandrinii Condorelli-Francaviglia, 1898
- Bothriocephalus andresi Porta, 1911
- Bothriocephalus angustatus Rudolphi, 1819
- Bothriocephalus angusticeps Olsson, 1868
- Bothriocephalus antarcticus Wojciechowska, Pisano & Zdzitowiecki, 1995
- Bothriocephalus apogonis Yamaguti, 1952
- Bothriocephalus atherinae Chernyshenko, 1949
- Bothriocephalus auriculatus Rudolphi, 1819
- Bothriocephalus australis Kuchta, Scholz & Justine, 2009
- Bothriocephalus barbatus Renaud Gabrion & Pasteur, 1983
- Bothriocephalus bengalensis Devi, 1975
- Bothriocephalus bifurcatus Leuckart, 1819
- Bothriocephalus brachysoma Wang, 1977
- Bothriocephalus bramae Ariola, 1899
- Bothriocephalus branchiostegi Yamaguti, 1952
- Bothriocephalus breviceps Guiart, 1935
- Bothriocephalus brotulae Yamaguti, 1952
- Bothriocephalus capillicollis Mégnin, 1883
- Bothriocephalus carangis Yamaguti, 1968
- Bothriocephalus celinae Kuchta, Scholz & Justine, 2009
- Bothriocephalus celineae Kuchta, Scholz & Justine, 2009
- Bothriocephalus cepolae Rudolphi, 1819
- Bothriocephalus clavibothrium Ariola, 1899
- Bothriocephalus claviceps (Goeze, 1782) Rudolphi, 1810
- Bothriocephalus claviceps Goeze, 1782
- Bothriocephalus coronatus Rudolphi, 1819
- Bothriocephalus cuspidatus Cooper, 1917
- Bothriocephalus euryciensis Schaeffer & Self, 1978
- Bothriocephalus fluviatilis Yamaguti, 1952
- Bothriocephalus formosus Mueller & Van Cleave, 1932
- Bothriocephalus funiculus Renaud & Gabrion, 1984
- Bothriocephalus gadellus Blend & Dronen, 2003
- Bothriocephalus gadi
- Bothriocephalus gregarius Renaud Gabrion & Pasteur, 1983
- Bothriocephalus hirondellei Guiart, 1935
- Bothriocephalus infundibuliformis Rudolphi, 1810
- Bothriocephalus japonicus Yamaguti, 1934
- Bothriocephalus kerguelensis Prudhoe, 1969
- Bothriocephalus labracis Dujardin, 1845
- Bothriocephalus lateolabracis Yamaguti, 1952
- Bothriocephalus levinseni Ariola, 1899
- Bothriocephalus lophii Rudolphi, 1819
- Bothriocephalus macrobothrium Monticelli, 1889
- Bothriocephalus macrophallus Linstow, 1905
- Bothriocephalus manubriformis (Linton, 1889) Ariola, 1900
- Bothriocephalus minutus Ariola, 1896
- Bothriocephalus monticelli Ariola, 1899
- Bothriocephalus motellae Olsson, 1893
- Bothriocephalus nigropunctatus Linstow, 1901
- Bothriocephalus occidentalis (Linton, 1897) Lühe, 1899
- Bothriocephalus palumbi Monticelli, 1889
- Bothriocephalus parvus Creplin, 1846
- Bothriocephalus pearsei Scholz, Vargas-Vázquez & Moravec, 1996
- Bothriocephalus phoxini Molnar, 1968
- Bothriocephalus rarus Thomas, 1937
- Bothriocephalus salvelini Lönnberg, 1892
- Bothriocephalus sauridae Ariola, 1900
- Bothriocephalus sciaenae Yamaguti, 1934
- Bothriocephalus scorpii (Müller, 1776) Cooper, 1917
- Bothriocephalus sphaerocephalum Deslongchamps, 1824
- Bothriocephalus spinachidae Olsson, 1863
- Bothriocephalus squali Ariola, 1900
- Bothriocephalus tetragonus Ariola, 1899
- Bothriocephalus timii Gil de Pertierra, Arredondo & Incorvaia, 2015
- Bothriocephalus tintinnabulus Guiart, 1935
- Bothriocephalus trachypteri Ariola, 1896
- Bothriocephalus trachypteriiris Ariola, 1896
- Bothriocephalus trachypteriliopteri Ariola, 1896
- Bothriocephalus travassosi Tubangui, 1938
- Bothriocephalus tumidulus Rudolphi, 1819
- Bothriocephalus typhlotritonis Reeves, 1949
- Bothriocephalus uncinatus Rudolphi, 1819
- Bothriocephalus vallei Stossich, 1899
- Bothriocephalus verticillatus Rudolphi, 1819
