= Senga (genus) =

Scientific classification
- Kingdom: Animalia
- Phylum: Platyhelminthes
- Class: Cestoda
- Order: Bothriocephalidea
- Family: Bothriocephalidae
- Genus: Senga; Dollfus, 1934

Genus of flatworms

Senga is a genus of flatworms belonging to the family Bothriocephalidae.

The genus has cosmopolitan distribution.

Species:

- Senga ashwiniae Jadhav & Bhure, 2025
- Senga bagariusi (Chincholikar & Shinde, 1977) Kuchta & Scholz, 2007
- Senga besnardi Dollfus, 1934
- Senga filiformis Fernando & Furtado, 1963
- Senga gangesii Gairola & Malhotra, 1986
- Senga killedharurensis Devidasrao, 2021
- Senga lucknowensis Johri, 1956
- Senga magna (Zmeev, 1936) Protasova, 1977
- Senga malayana Fernando & Furtado, 1963
- Senga ophiocephalina (Tseng, 1933) Kuchta & Scholz, 2007
- Senga pahangensis Furtado & Chau-lan, 1971
- Senga pathankotensis Duggal & Bedi, 1989
- Senga pycnomera (Woodland, 1924) Dollfus, 1934
- Senga scleropagis (Blair, 1978) Kuchta & Scholz, 2007
- Senga taunsaensis Zaidi & Khan, 1976
- Senga visakhapatnamensis Ramadevi & Rao, 1973
