= Hikari Senga =

Japanese voice actress (born 1999)

- 千賀 光莉
- Born: 13 August 1999 (age 27); Fukushima, Japan
- Occupation: Voice actress
- Years active: 2024–present
- Agent: First Wind Production
- Notable work: Star Detective Precure! as Anna Akechi/Cure Answer; Kaiju Girl Caramelise as Kuroe Akaishi

Hikari Senga (Japanese: 千賀 光莉, Hepburn: Senga Hikaru; born 13 August 1999) is a Japanese voice actress from Fukushima, affiliated with First Wind Production. She is starring as Anna Akechi/Cure Answer in Star Detective Precure! and Kuroe Akaishi in Kaiju Girl Caramelise.

== Early life and education ==
Senga was born in Fukushima on 13 August 1999. She attended a kindergarten whose headmistress taught opera at its affiliated university, making her interested in an opera career, even appearing in at least one opera production. Senga decided on a voice acting career while balancing that and musical theatre, a decision she credited to her anime-loving father. In junior high school, Senga once brought up her voice acting ambitions on a local Fukushima radio show.

Senga moved to Tokyo to study vocal music at a university. Despite planning to go into musical theatre, she instead chose anime for its wider audience reach and sustained activity compared to theatrical performances being suspended due to the COVID-19 pandemic, and starting in her third year of university, attended a voice acting training school for three years. Immediately after being signed to First Wind Production, Senga made her voice acting debut as the titular character of the Toriaezu Karubi-chan project.

== Career ==
In December 2025, she was cast as Kuroe Akaishi, the main character of the 2026 anime adaptation of Kaiju Girl Caramelise. In February 2026, she made her first anime TV series lead role debut as Anna Akechi/Cure Answer in Star Detective Precure!. A fan of the franchise since childhood, Senga stated that she was moved upon hearing the news that she had passed the audition. That same month, she was cast as Epiphaneia in Umamusume: Pretty Derby.

Christopher Farris of Anime News Network remarked on her performance as Kuroe: "Just the sound of Hikari Senga's evocative anime-girl wail alongside the kaiju roar when she transforms is a brilliant touch that sells the appeal of this monster-girl angst." Senga said in an interview that she is interested in making performances similar to voice actresses with "captivating, mature older sister" voices, specifically citing Miyuki Sawashiro, Atsuko Tanaka, and Maaya Sakamoto.

Senga lists radio, cooking, singing, and illustration among her hobbies and special skills. She often spends her days off cooking, and having majored in vocal music in university, she frequently goes to karaoke solo. She has an older sister.

== Filmography ==
=== Anime ===
| Year | Title | Role | Other notes |
|---|---|---|---|
| 2026 | Star Detective Precure! | Anna Akechi / Cure Answer | |
| 2026 | Kaiju Girl Caramelise | Kuroe Akaishi | |

=== Video games ===
| Year | Title | Role |
|---|---|---|
| 2026 | Umamusume: Pretty Derby | Epiphaneia |
