= Bothriocephalidae =

Scientific classification
- Kingdom: Animalia
- Phylum: Platyhelminthes
- Class: Cestoda
- Order: Bothriocephalidea
- Family: Bothriocephalidae

Family of flatworms

Bothriocephalidae is a family of flatworms belonging to the order Bothriocephalidea.

== Genera ==
Genera:

- Anantrum Overstreet, 1968
- Andycestus Kuchta, Scholz & Bray, 2008
- Bothriocephalus Rudolphi, 1808
- Senga Dollfus 1934
