= Rokudo's Bad Girls =

Japanese manga series

- Cover of the first manga volume featuring Ranna Himawari

六道の悪女(おんな)たち (Rokudō no Onna-tachi)
- Genre: Romantic comedy
- Manga
- Written by: Yūji Nakamura
- Published by: Akita Shoten
- Imprint: Shōnen Champion Comics
- Magazine: Weekly Shōnen Champion
- Original run: June 23, 2016 – April 8, 2021
- Volumes: 26
- Anime television series
- Directed by: Keiya Saitō
- Produced by: Hisato Usui; Kento Yoshida; Souri Nakazawa; Ryou Hino; Yuuko Matsuo; Hiroaki Yamazaki; Maiko Fuchie; Hideaki Hata; Kazuo Kiuchi; Atsushi Ryuushou
- Written by: Yūichirō Momose
- Music by: Takatsugu Wakabayashi
- Studio: Satelight
- Licensed by: Crunchyroll (streaming); SA/SEA: Muse Communication
- Original network: Tokyo MX, MBS, BS Asahi
- Original run: April 8, 2023 – June 24, 2023
- Episodes: 12

Rokudo's Bad Girls (Japanese: 六道の悪女(おんな)たち, Hepburn: Rokudō no Onna-tachi; "Rokudō's Wicked Girls") is a Japanese manga series written and illustrated by Yūji Nakamura. The manga was serialized in Akita Shoten's Weekly Shōnen Champion from June 2016 to April 2021, with its chapters collected into twenty-six tankōbon volumes. An anime television series adaptation by Satelight aired from April to June 2023.

== Plot ==
Tousuke Rokudou, a first-year student at Amori High, a school attended mostly by delinquents, wants to live a peaceful life with his friends. However, this seems to be impossible because he is constantly bullied by his delinquent classmates. When Rokudou and his friends become desperate, Rokudou receives a mysterious package from his long-deceased grandfather. Inside lies, a priest's uniform and a mysterious scroll passed down through his family since the Japanese Heian period, said to hold a technique warding off demons and evil spirits. In hopes of combating his delinquent tormentors, he undergoes the ritual to activate the scroll's power. The scroll initially seems to have no effect on his school's delinquent population, but once a bully tormenting Rokudou is stopped by a delinquent girl, Rokudou's friends realize the technique's power does not ward off evil spirits and monsters, but rather makes the user popular with bad women. After realizing the potential of his newfound ability, Rokudou vows to become stronger and use his power to achieve his dream of having a peaceful school life, unwittingly acquiring a harem of delinquent schoolgirls along the way.

== Characters ==
Tousuke Rokudou (六道 桃助, Rokudō Tōsuke)
Voiced by: Gen Satō
The main protagonist of the series, Tousuke Rokudou is physically weak and cowardly attending a school filled with delinquent students. He and his two friends live in constant fear and is regularly bullied, leading to the trio venting their frustrations in private in the school's restroom. Upon receiving a scroll from his grandfather, Rokudou gains a special pentagram mark on his forehead. Rokudou's ancestors used this spell to exorcise oni, but in the modern day, the spell causes any "bad girl" to instantly fall in love with him once he makes eye contact with them. His school life drastically changes as not only is he thrust into the delinquent culture of his school, but he encounters several girls, each one presenting a new problem. He helps rehabilitate most of the girls focused on, each one genuinely falling in love with Rokudou or becoming a close ally. While Rokudou refuses to fight in the beginning of the story, his tenacity and refusal to run away has garnered respect from his former bullies. Later, he learns kung-fu and has learned most of its fundamentals from Ling Lan.
Ranna Himawari (向日葵 乱奈, Himawari Ranna)
Voiced by: Sumire Uesaka
Ranna Himawari is a young girl with a notorious reputation as a Sukeban wielding a Bokken, often described as a "monster" for her sheer strength and brutality. She is the first main girl to fall in love under Rokudou's spell. Generally, Ranna does not speak or express much emotion other than emotional distance unless Rokudou is around, but tolerates his friends. Around Rokudou, she is extremely bubbly and smiles. She will not hesitate to stop and protect him when he is in danger, but will respect his wishes as she did not step in between Rokudou and Iinuma's fight when he asked her to and only attacked once he asked for her help. As a child, it is revealed that Ranna was adopted by an elderly couple because someone had left her at their doorstep. To their shock, even as a baby, she had a horribly demonic visage. Growing up, Ranna was nothing short of a demon for her cruel actions, even brutally dragging a priest tied to her tricycle. Thanks to special beads from the same priest, she became more demure, but reverted once they shattered. Years later, Rokudou would receive a pair of these beads, though now they completely pacify her, causing her to deeply fear them. Her surname, Himawari, means Sunflower in Japanese.
"Colonel" (Masaru Hinomoto) (火野本 勝, Hinomoto Masaru)
Voiced by: Daisuke Namikawa
Most likely nicknamed for military beret and camouflage in his outfit, "Colonel" is one of Rokudou's friends from the beginning of the series. He shares Rokudou's dream of living a peaceful school life, free of his delinquent bullies. Along with Rokudou and their friend "Manager", he huddles in a bathroom stall during school hours to vent his frustration with the way his life at Amori High is. He is the first to theorize that the ability Rokudou received from the scroll was that of making him popular with "bad girls." He frequently assists with conflicts Rokudou is involved in, along with his friends.
"Manager" (Kouta Kijima) (木嶋 耕太, Kijima Kōta)
Voiced by: Akira Ishida
Most likely nicknamed for his formal attire and businesslike demeanor, "Manager" is one of Rokudou's friends at the beginning of the series. Like "Colonel" and Rokudou, he too, wishes to lead a peaceful life at Amori High and is constantly bullied by his delinquent classmates. Like "Colonel", he notices that Rokudou is popular with "bad girls" and tags along with Rokudou and his friends when he gets into conflict with delinquent gangs.
Haruya Iinuma (飯沼 波瑠也, Iinuma Haruya)
Voiced by: Haruki Ishiya
Iinuma was the main bully of Rokudou and his friends, subjecting them to cruel pranks at their expense. After Rokudou awakens his powers and inadvertently affected his girlfriend, Tsubaki, he challenged him to a fight. Despite being overwhelmingly stronger than him, Rokudou refused to run and took an intense beating before he asked Ranna to intervene in the fight. Impressed by his tenacity, Iinuma befriends Rokudou and becomes one of his closest allies, eventually becoming close enough to know about his power. He is one of the strongest fighters in Amori high, only behind to Ranna and Sayuri in terms of raw strength. Iinuma has a love for both ramen and motorcycles, desiring to one day own a mobile ramen stand. He loves customizing his motorcycle, but tends to make them overly gaudy and flashy with unnecessary "upgrades."
Tsubaki (椿, Tsubaki)
Voiced by: Misato Matsuoka
Originally one of Rokudou's many bullies, Tsubaki is Iinuma's girlfriend. After she falls under the spell of Rokudou's powers, she becomes remorseful for the way she treats him, and apologizes to him while in the bathroom. Her attention to him draws the initial ire of Iinuma, though after the two become friends, Tsubaki regularly hangs out with Rokudou and his friends. She does not react to Rokudou's power anymore. Her name comes from the Japanese word for Camellias, tsubaki.
Sayuri Osanada (幼田 小百合, Osanada Sayuri)
Voiced by: Naomi Ōzora
With the appearance and demeanor of an elementary school, Sayuri is often mistaken as one despite being a student at Aomori High. Despite her petite appearance, Sayuri is the bancho of the school having built a reputation as its strongest physical fighter. She originally targets Rokudou for his inexplicable ability to become popular with the female students of Amori High, but when she begins her attack on him, she becomes enamored with him due to his spell's power. Rokudou thus becomes her first love. Through the influence of Rokudou, she reforms and reintegrates back into school life and helps him achieve his dream of a peaceful life by means of her powerful influence over her classmates. She has since become a powerful ally of Rokudou and one of the first to jump to his aid when matters involving outside delinquents befall him or Amori. Her name, Sayuri, means Lily in Japanese.
Azami Himeno (姫野 莇美, Himeno Azami)
Voiced by: Yuki Yomichi
Passionate about police work and motorcycles, Azami Himeno is the third major female character to become enamored with Rokudou. Initially assumed to be sweet and feminine, she loves riding motorcycles. She holds a grudge against biker gangs, who she violently beats while mounted on her motorcycle. She acts like a vigilante, warning citizens about traffic safety and taking down those she perceives to be evil delinquents on the road. She is the only one of the main girls to not attend Amori High. Her forename is a play on the Japanese word for Thistle, azami.
Minami Yamabuki (山吹 ミナミ, Yamabuki Minami)
Minami is the fourth girl Rokudou rehabilitates who has the general appearance as a bat prior to meeting Rokudou. Originally a loan shark who had scammed out money from hundreds of people, her latest being Manager's parents. In a twist of fate, she meets Rokudou and falls victim to his power and begins lavishly spending her money to impress him. She also gives him advice on how to help Manager stop his parents' loan shark, ironically putting a halt to her own plans. When she discovers Rokudou's role, she becomes despondent when her allies betray her and steal her remaining money. After hearing his plight, she gifts the money to Jin. She later enrolls Amori High the next school year as a first year student. Her surname in Japanese is based on the Japanese Marigold Bush.
Ling Lan (鈴蘭, Ling Lan)
When Rokudou and his male friends attempted to search a remote mountain for a temple that supposedly had the beads that could pacify Ranna, Rokudou encountered Ling Lan who had found them while they were lost in the forest. Upon first glance, she was serene, even described as a "goddess" by Rokudou and his friends. In reality, she too was wearing the very beads Rokudou had been searching for. Upon returning to the temple, she had inadvertently removed the beads wanting to give it to Rokudou to help him, but in the process had removed its effects and becomes the fifth girl. Ling Lan is a foul mouth, brash, and fight-seeking girl and a master of kung-fu. While immune to Rokudou's spell with the beads on, upon its removal, she too fell under his spell. She teaches Rokudou the basics of kung-fu and after a week, he had grasped enough basics to become a competent fighter and she falls in love with him. After the priest decided to depart on a pilgrimage with the remaining rehabilitating teenagers, Ling Lan enrolls at Amori High school as Rokudou's underclassmen in his second year. Her name in Chinese means Lily of the Valley.
Sachiyo Sakura (桜 沙知代, Sakura Sachiyo)
Adopted daughter of a female crime boss, Sachiyo has the power of foresight by looking into the eyes of another person. Her clairvoyance ranges in time, but in most instances she uses it to see into the near future. It was initially believed that she was sent to Amori High School as a new first year student by her mother to extort the student body using her power. Unbeknownst to her, her mother intentionally sent her there to meet Rokudou and use his power to reform her into a normal girl, making her the sixth girl. Upon falling to his power, she loses her foresight, becoming clumsy as a result and slightly depressed by the loss of her own power. Her mother's associates kidnap her as they need her power to maintain their hold on the criminal underworld. Her surname in Japanese, Sakura, means Cherry Blossom.

=== Onishima Alliance (鬼島連合) ===
Douji Matsugamiya (松ヶ宮 童子, Matsugamiya Douji)
Voiced by: Daiki Yamashita
Leader of the Onishima Alliance. Though he is polite, he can also be extremely intimidating. Like Rokudou, he was once a timid and extremely fearful of other people, resorting to bribing stronger individuals to protect him. He eventually joined the Onishima Alliance in order to be surrounded by strong individuals. After Ranna easily defeated the Alliance on her own, he fell in love with her strength and desired to have her join the alliance by gathering strong individuals to refortify its ranks, taking over as leader of the Alliance in the process. Despite being a coward in the past, he has become strong enough to fight off Rokudou and his friends all on his own. Despite failing to recruit Ranna, he soon realizes that he has become strong and his allies in the Alliance genuinely admire him for his strength and acknowledges his worth without any bribe to validate him.
Yui Yashiya (椰子谷 唯, Yashiya Yui)
Voiced by: Mayuko Kazama
Holding Rank 1 in the Onishima Alliance and is the strongest member of its alliance after Douji. She has an interest in strong men, but she shows her feelings through acts of sadism, reveling in breaking their spirits. Under Rokudou's power, she sees him as an exaggeratedly strong man that progressively intensifies during their fight. Rokudou "defeats" her after rescuing her from falling out a window, causing his power to exaggerate his appearance so much that she faints in bliss. In the aftermath of the fight between the Onishima Alliance and Amori High, she leaves the Onishima Alliance. Part of her surname, Yashi, means Palm Tree.
Sumire Triplets
The Sumire Triplets are three biological triplet siblings who share the 5th rank of the Onishima Alliance, though Amano is the true 5th rank. Amano is the eldest, Kazeno is the middle, and Raino is the youngest and only girl. They are near identical in appearance and are skilled enough to use make-up to flawlessly impersonate each other. Their names contain the kanji for Sky, Wind, and Lightning respectively while their surname, Sumire, is Violet in Japanese.
Raino Sumire (菫 雷乃, Sumire Raino)
Voiced by: Reina Ueda
The youngest of the Sumire Triplets and the only girl. Raino crossdresses, taking on an appearance and personality of an Ikemen and is skilled with make up. Her make-up skills are so convincing that she could effortlessly disguise Rokudou as a cute girl. She falls under Rokudou's power during the Onishima arc and acts girly around him. She genuinely falls in love with Rokudou for his kind heart and gives him his first kiss. Later she confesses her feelings to Rokudou, but he gently rejects her. She shares Rank 5 with Kazeno in the Onishima Alliance.
Kazeno Sumire (菫 風乃, Sumire Kazeno)
Voiced by: Reina Ueda
The middle child of the Sumire Triplets, Kazeno frequently crossdresses as a female and acts similarly to an idol. He is protective of his sister and is initially disturbed by Rokudou due to seeing his sister fall under his power and later when Rokudou claimed that he is a pervert to hide his power from Kazeno. Like his sister, he idolizes Amano, but desires to stand as an equal to him rather than follow in his footsteps. He assists his sister during the Onishima arc to help her fight for Rokudou. He and Raino share the Rank 5 in the Onishima Alliance.
Amano Sumire (菫 天乃, Sumire Amano)
Voiced by: Reina Ueda
The eldest of the Sumire Triplets, Amano is a secret member of the Onishima Alliance and the true 5th Rank. He is greatly admired by his two younger siblings and is the one who recruited them into the Onishima Alliance. In their youth, they would use their shared physical appearances to pull off mischief. He is the one who taught Kazeno and Raino how to fight and how to use make-up. During the battle against Amori high, Raino fights him and wins, leading him to acknowledge that his siblings are now his equals. While his two siblings leave the Alliance, Amano willingly stays.

=== Other characters ===
Aoi Furukawa (布留川 葵, Furukawa Aoi)
Voiced by: Hiroki Nanami
Aoi was a member of the Onjima Alliance, leading its motorcycle squad. He is normally warm and friendly, but can become violent and extremely competitive behind the wheel of his motorcycle. He was slowly being reformed by a motorcycle riding police officer until the officer was badly injured in an accident. He is a close associate to Himeno and raced against her and Rokudou, but lost. He left his gang behind and left Azami in charge of them. He has remained close with her, but often gets competitive around her.
Erika Otohime (乙姫 恵梨香, Otohime Erika)
Voiced by: Yuri Komagata
Erika is the leader of an all girl-gang, Team Ryuugu. In the past, Team Ryuugu was a street gang who constantly got into fights with rival gangs. During a brawl, Ranna joined in and became an unofficial member, helping her team ascend to the top of the city gangs. However, once the Onishima Alliance began attacking her crew, she decided to disband it for their safety. She is the one who gave Ranna her wooden sword. Now her gang are law abiding citizens who continue to dress in their original gang style. After seeing Ranna's personality change, she tasks Rokudou to keep her happy. Her name contains the kanji for Pear tree.
Sachiko Sakura (桜 沙知子, Sakura Sachiko)
A 42 year old female Yakuza crime boss and was indirectly involved with Minami's story as she tasked Jin with targeting Manager's parents' warehouse. She is the adoptive mother of Sachiyo whom she found in Sachiyo's biological parents' apartment after they amassed a massive debt to her and abandoned Sachiyo as a result. She immediately discovered Sachiyo's power and adopted her, using her power to help grow her crime family. Over time, Sachiko developed a motherly bond with her and desired to keep her out of the underground world. After encountering Rokudou and falling victim to his spell effects, she extensively researched his power and easily figured out its mechanics as well as his history of using the power. Wanting Sachiyo to live a normal life, she intentionally made her attend Amori High as a means to achieve this and directly enlisted Rokudou's help to achieve this goal. Rokudou accepts her request to rehabilitate her daughter, but refuses her protection should Ranna ever go on a rampage. Grateful for his kindness, Sachiko still promises to intervene with Ranna once her daughter has been reformed.
Mizue Tsuyukusa (露草 水絵, Tsuyukusa Mizue)
Voiced by: Hitomi Sekine

== Media ==
=== Manga ===
Written and illustrated by Yūji Nakamura, Rokudō no Onna-tachi was serialized in Akita Shoten's Weekly Shōnen Champion magazine from June 23, 2016, to April 8, 2021. It has been collected into twenty-six tankōbon volumes.

==== Volumes ====
| No. | Japanese release date | Japanese ISBN |
|---|---|---|
| 01 | November 8, 2016 | 978-4-253-22576-2 |
| 02 | February 8, 2017 | 978-4-253-22577-9 |
| 03 | April 7, 2017 | 978-4-253-22578-6 |
| 04 | May 8, 2017 | 978-4-253-22579-3 |
| 05 | July 7, 2017 | 978-4-253-22580-9 |
| 06 | October 6, 2017 | 978-4-253-22581-6 |
| 07 | December 6, 2017 | 978-4-253-22582-3 |
| 08 | March 8, 2018 | 978-4-253-22583-0 |
| 09 | May 8, 2018 | 978-4-253-22584-7 |
| 10 | July 6, 2018 | 978-4-253-22585-4 |
| 11 | September 7, 2018 | 978-4-253-22586-1 |
| 12 | December 7, 2018 | 978-4-253-22587-8 |
| 13 | February 8, 2019 | 978-4-253-22588-5 |
| 14 | April 8, 2019 | 978-4-253-22589-2 |
| 15 | June 7, 2019 | 978-4-253-22590-8 |
| 16 | August 8, 2019 | 978-4-253-22856-5 |
| 17 | November 8, 2019 | 978-4-253-22857-2 |
| 18 | January 8, 2020 | 978-4-253-22858-9 |
| 19 | April 8, 2020 | 978-4-253-22859-6 |
| 20 | May 8, 2020 | 978-4-253-22860-2 |
| 21 | August 6, 2020 | 978-4-253-22862-6 |
| 22 | October 8, 2020 | 978-4-253-22863-3 |
| 23 | December 8, 2020 | 978-4-253-22864-0 |
| 24 | March 8, 2021 | 978-4-253-22865-7 |
| 25 | May 7, 2021 | 978-4-253-22866-4 |
| 26 | June 8, 2021 | 978-4-253-22867-1 |

=== Anime ===
An anime television series adaptation was announced on January 18, 2023. It is produced by Satelight and directed by Keiya Saitō, with scripts supervised by Yūichirō Momose, character designs by Shinya Segawa, sub-character designs by Hideaki Ōnishi, mechanical designs by Hiroyuki Taiga, prop designs by Yasuyoshi Uetsu and Tomoaki Chishima, and music composed by Takatsugu Wakabayashi. The series aired from April 8 to June 24, 2023, on Tokyo MX and other networks. The opening theme song is "Endless Labyrinth" by EverdreaM, while the ending theme song is "Love Will Find A Way" by The Rampage from Exile Tribe. Crunchyroll streamed the series worldwide outside of Asia, while Muse Communication licensed it for the rest of Asia-Pacific and India, and streamed it on its YouTube channel.

==== Episodes ====
| No. | Title | Directed by (Note: Information is taken from the ending credits of each episode.) | Written by | Storyboarded by | Original release date |
|---|---|---|---|---|---|
| 1 | "Enjoying Our Time at School in Peace"; Transliteration: "Heiwa de Tanoshii Gakuen Seikatsu" (Japanese: 平和で楽しい学園生活) | Keiya Saitō | Yūichirō Momose | Keiya Saitō | April 8, 2023 |
| 2 | "The Top Dog at Our School Is After You"; Transliteration: "Omae, Uchi no Banchō ni Nerawareteru zo" (Japanese: お前、ウチの番長に狙われてるぞ) | Mayo Nozaki | Yūichirō Momose | Sayo Aoi | April 15, 2023 |
| 3 | "The Happy Road Home That Goes On Forever"; Transliteration: "Doko Made mo Tsuzuku Shiawase na Kaerimichi da" (Japanese: どこまでも続く幸せな帰り道だ) | Ryō Miyata | Yūichirō Momose | Yoshiaki Okumura | April 22, 2023 |
| 4 | "A Princess on a Motorbike"; Transliteration: "Baiku ni Notta Ohime-sama" (Japanese: バイクに乗ったお姫様) | Masanori Miyata (Note: Scene Episode Director (シーン演出)) | Yūichirō Momose | Takaaki Ishiyama | April 29, 2023 |
| 5 | "Motorbikes Are Symbols of Freedom"; Transliteration: "Baiku wa Jiyū no Shōchō Nan Dakara" (Japanese: バイクは自由の象徴なんだから) | Hisoka Maejima | Yūichirō Momose | Satoshi Shimizu | May 6, 2023 |
| 6 | "It's My Treasure"; Transliteration: "Watashi no Takaramono" (Japanese: 私の宝物) | Ryō Miyata | Yūichirō Momose | Keiya Saitō | May 13, 2023 |
| 7 | "You're the Key, Rokudo Tosuke"; Transliteration: "Omae ga Kagi ka Rokudō Tōsuke" (Japanese: お前が鍵か六道桃助) | Mayo Nozaki | Yūichirō Momose | Mayo Nozaki | May 20, 2023 |
| 8 | "We're Taking Himawari Ranna"; Transliteration: "Itadaku zo, Himawari Ranna" (Japanese: 頂くぞ、向日葵乱奈) | Takashi Satō | Yūichirō Momose | Satoshi Shimizu | May 27, 2023 |
| 9 | "You're Not Alone"; Transliteration: "Omae wa Hitori ja Nai" (Japanese: お前は一人じゃない) | Nanako Shimazaki | Yūichirō Momose | Nanako Shimazaki | June 3, 2023 |
| 10 | "We're Gonna Win"; Transliteration: "Katsu no wa Oretachi da" (Japanese: 勝つのは俺達だ) | Ryō Miyata | Yūichirō Momose | Takaaki Ishiyama | June 10, 2023 |
| 11 | "This Is Where We Say Goodbye, Rokudo"; Transliteration: "Rokudō-kun to wa Koko de Owakare" (Japanese: 六道君とはここでお別れ) | Hisoka Maejima | Yūichirō Momose | Sayo Aoi | June 17, 2023 |
| 12 | "Our Dream School Lives Have Begun"; Transliteration: "Risō no Gakuen Seikatsu no Hajimari da!" (Japanese: 理想の学園生活の始まりだ！) | Mayo Nozaki | Yūichirō Momose | Keiya Saitō | June 24, 2023 |
