= A.C.G.T =

Japanese animation studio

A.C.G.T. Inc.
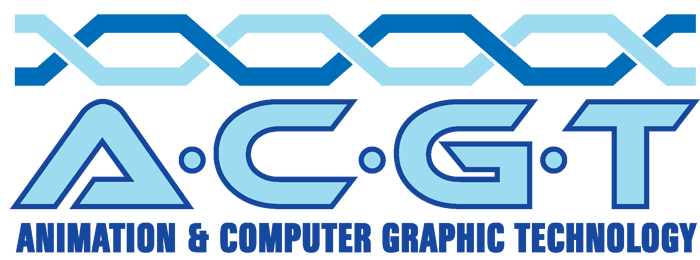
- Native name: 株式会社エー・シー・ジー・ティー
- Romanized name: Kabushiki-gaisha Ē shī jī tī
- Type: Kabushiki gaisha
- Industry: Japanese animation
- Predecessor: Triangle Staff
- Founded: December 19, 2000; 25 years ago
- Founder: Shōjiro Abe
- Headquarters: Nerima, Tokyo, Japan
- Key people: Shōjiro Abe (CEO); Takeshi Baba
- Website: acgt.co.jp

A.C.G.T Inc. (Japanese: 株式会社エー・シー・ジー・ティー, Hepburn: Kabushiki-gaisha Ē shī jī tī; stylized as A・C・G・T) is a Japanese animation studio established on December 19, 2000, by former Triangle Staff members in Suginami, Tokyo. It has been involved in the development of many series, predominantly contributing to other studios and adapting works based on light novels and manga. It is a subsidiary of OB Planning, which handles executive production on many of its series. A.C.G.T also works regularly with production company Genco, which at times provides executive production while A.C.G.T completes animation production. In 2006, the studio's headquarters was moved from Suginami to Nerima.

== Works ==
=== Television series ===
Year	Title	Director(s)	Animation producer(s)	Source	Eps.	Refs.
2002	Seven of Seven	Yasuhiro Imagawa	Shōjiro Abe	Manga	25	
2002	Duel Masters (co-animated with Studio Hibari)	Waruro Suzuki	Shōjiro Abe (A.C.G.T); Seiji Mitsunobu (Studio Hibari)	Card game	26	
2003	Human Crossing	Kazunari Kume	Shōjiro Abe	Manga	13	
2003	Kino's Journey	Ryūtarō Nakamura	Shōjiro Abe	Light novel	13	
2003	Dear Boys	Susumu Kudō	Shōjiro Abe	Manga	26	
2004	Initial D Fourth Stage	Tsuneo Tominaga	Shōjiro Abe	Manga	24	
2004	Koi Kaze	Takahiro Omori	Shōjiro Abe ("produce"[sic])	Manga	13	
2005	Lime-iro Ryūkitan X	Tsuneo Tominaga	Shōjiro Abe (A.C.G.T); Yasunori Muratake (Softgarage)	Eroge	13	
2006	Project Blue Earth SOS	Tensai Okamura	—N/a	Novel	6	
2007	GR: Giant Robo	Ren Usami; Masahiko Murata	Unknown	Manga	13	
2007	Wangan Midnight	Tsuneo Tominaga	—N/a	Manga	26	
2008	Kimi ga Aruji de Shitsuji ga Ore de	Susumu Kudō	Shōjiro Abe	Eroge	13	
2008	Monochrome Factor	Yū Kō	Shōjiro Abe	Manga	24	
2011	Freezing	Takashi Watanabe	Shōjiro Abe	Manga	12	
2013	Freezing Vibration	Takashi Watanabe	Shōjiro Abe	Manga	12	
2014	Dai-Shogun – Great Revolution (co-animated with J.C.Staff)	Takashi Watanabe	Shōjiro Abe (A.C.G.T); Masao Ōhashi (J.C.Staff)	Original work	12	
2017	Minami Kamakura High School Girls Cycling Club (co-animated with J.C.Staff)	Susumu Kudō	Shōjiro Abe (A.C.G.T); Yūji Matsukura (J.C.Staff)	Manga	13	
2017	Dies Irae	Susumu Kudō	Shōjiro Abe	Visual novel	12	
2022	Orient	Tetsuya Yanagisawa	Shōjiro Abe (A.C.G.T); Seiji Suzuki (S-Wood)	Manga	24	
2023	Berserk of Gluttony	Tetsuya Yanagisawa	Shōjiro Abe (A.C.G.T); Seiji Suzuki (S-Wood)	Light novel	12	
2026	Roll Over and Die	Nobuharu Kamanaka	TBA	Light novel	12	
2027	Berserk of Gluttony (season 2)	Tetsuya Yanagisawa; Kenichi Ishikura	TBA	Light novel	TBA	

=== Original video animations ===
Year	Title	Director(s)	Animation producer(s)	Source	Eps.	Refs.
2003	New Fist of the North Star	Takashi Watanabe	Shōjiro Abe	Manga	3	
2005	Kino's Journey: Tower Country	Ryūtarō Nakamura	Shōjiro Abe	Light novel	1	
2007	Initial D Battle Stage 2	Tsuneo Tominaga	—N/a	Manga	1	
2008	Initial D Extra Stage 2: Tabidachi no Green	Tsuneo Tominaga	—N/a	Manga	1	
2017	Dies irae: The Dawning Days	Susumu Kudō	Shōjiro Abe	Visual novel	1	
2018	Dies Irae: To the Ring Reincarnation	Susumu Kudō	Shōjiro Abe	Visual novel	6	

=== Films ===
Year	Title	Director(s)	Animation producer(s)	Source	Refs.
2005	Kino's Journey: Life Goes On	Takashi Watanabe	Shōjiro Abe (A.C.G.T); Nobuhiro Ōsawa (Genco)	Light novel	

=== Gross outsource works ===
Works in which ACGT served as a "gross outsource" (full outsource) studio, either for the entire series or an episode.

- A Certain Scientific Accelerator (J.C.Staff, 2019)
- Do You Love Your Mom and Her Two-Hit Multi-Target Attacks? (J.C.Staff, 2019)

== Notable staff ==
=== Representative staff ===
- Shōjiro Abe (founder and president)

=== Animators ===
- Masahiro Andou (animator)
