= Hitomi Sekine =

Japanese voice actress (born 2000)

- 関根 瞳
- Born: 9 May 2000 (age 26)
- Occupations: Voice actress; singer
- Years active: 2018–present
- Employer: I'm Enterprise
- Notable work: The Idolmaster Shiny Colors as Mano Sakuragi; Berserk of Gluttony as Ellis Seifort; Otaku Elf as Koyuzu Koganei; Goodbye, Dragon Life as Celina

Hitomi Sekine (Japanese: 関根 瞳, Hepburn: Sekine Hitomi; born 9 May 2000) is a Japanese voice actress and singer affiliated with I'm Enterprise. She is known for voicing Mano Sakuragi in The Idolmaster Shiny Colors, Ryoko Sukuno in Shinobi no Ittoki, Ellis Seifort in Berserk of Gluttony, Koyuzu Koganei in Otaku Elf, and Celina in Goodbye, Dragon Life. She is also a member of the J-Pop duo Everdream.

== Biography ==
Hitomi Sekine, a native of Tokyo, was born on 9 May 2000. She wanted to become a voice actor after watching the anime Gintama on the recommendation of a friend while in the fifth grade of elementary school. She joined I'm Enterprise in April 2017, a month before her 17th birthday, after studying at the Japan Narration Actor Institute.

In 2018, Sekine made her debut as Mano Sakuragi in The Idolmaster Shiny Colors, a sub-franchise in The Idolmaster franchise. Since then, she has performed as a singer on several Idolmaster music releases, including the 2018 single "The Idolmaster Shiny Colors Brilliant Wing 02: Hikari no Destination" (which charted at #11 in the Oricon Singles Chart) and the 2021 single "The Idolmaster Poplinks Poplinks Tune!!!!!" (which charted at #14 in the Oricon Singles Chart). She reprised her role in the 2024 anime adaptation.

In June 2022, Sekine was cast as Ryoko Sukuno, a major character in Shinobi no Ittoki. In 2023, she starred as Ellis Seifort in Berserk of Gluttony, Mizue in Rokudo's Bad Girls, and Koyuzu Koganei in Otaku Elf. In 2024, she was cast as Celina in Goodbye, Dragon Life.

In 2018, Sekine became a member of Marine Entertainment's voice acting unit TearLove. She remained active with them until their last concert in 2022. She and Misato Matsuoka later formed the rock singing duo Everdream.

== Filmography ==
=== Animated television ===
Year	Title	Role	Ref.
2019	A Certain Scientific Accelerator		
2019	Girly Air Force		
2019	Teasing Master Takagi-san		
2019	Wasteful Days of High School Girls		
2020	Ahiru no Sora		
2020	Fruits Basket		
2020	Healin' Good Pretty Cure	Amano	
2020	Mewkledreamy		
2020	White Cat Project: Zero Chronicle		
2021	Cells at Work!		
2022	Doraemon		
2022	Shinobi no Ittoki	Ryoko Sukuno	
2023	Berserk of Gluttony	Ellis Seifort	
2023	Rokudo's Bad Girls	Mizue	
2023	KonoSuba: An Explosion on This Wonderful World!		
2023	Otaku Elf	Koyuzu Koganei	
2024	Goodbye, Dragon Life	Celina	
2024	The Idolmaster Shiny Colors	Mano Sakuragi	
2026	Full Clearing Another World Under a Goddess with Zero Believers	Aya Sasaki	

=== Video games ===
Year	Title	Role	Ref.
2018	The Idolmaster Shiny Colors	Mano Sakuragi	
2019	Kōya no Kotobuki Hikōtai: Ōzora no Take Off Girls!	Moa	
2020	Azur Lane	Chitose, Chiyoda	
2025	Umamusume: Pretty Derby	Red Desire	
