= Berserk of Gluttony =

Japanese light novel series

- First light novel cover, featuring Roxy Hart (left) and Fate Graphite (right)

暴食のベルセルク ～俺だけレベルという概念を突破する～ (Bōshoku no Beruseruku Ore dake Reberu to Iu Gainen wo Toppa suru)
- Genre: Dark fantasy
- Novel series
- Written by: Ichika Isshiki
- Published by: Shōsetsuka ni Narō (2017–2022); Kakuyomu (2022–present)
- Original run: January 24, 2017 – present
- Light novel
- Written by: Ichika Isshiki
- Illustrated by: fame
- Published by: Micro Magazine
- English publisher: NA: Seven Seas Entertainment
- Imprint: GC Novels
- Original run: November 30, 2017 – present
- Volumes: 8
- Manga
- Written by: Ichika Isshiki
- Illustrated by: Daisuke Takino
- Published by: Micro Magazine
- English publisher: NA: Seven Seas Entertainment
- Imprint: Ride Comics
- Magazine: Comic Ride
- Original run: March 1, 2018 – present
- Volumes: 15
- Anime television series
- Directed by: Tetsuya Yanagisawa (Note: Chief director for the second season); Kenichi Ishikura (S2)
- Produced by: Kozue Kaneniwa; Takanori Matsuoka; Yukihiko Nakao; Tomoyuki Oowada; Kimihito Sekido; Hisato Usui; Yang Guoxiang; Kazuo Kiuchi
- Written by: Mariko Kunisawa
- Music by: Yuuichi Oono
- Studio: A.C.G.T (Note: Animation production assistance (アニメーション制作協力) for all episodes provided by A-Line.)
- Licensed by: Crunchyroll; SA / SEA: Muse Communication
- Original network: Tokyo MX, SUN, BS11
- Original run: October 5, 2023 – present
- Episodes: 12
- icon

Berserk of Gluttony (Japanese: 暴食のベルセルク ～俺だけレベルという概念を突破する～, Hepburn: Bōshoku no Beruseruku Ore dake Reberu to Iu Gainen o Toppa suru; "Berserk of Gluttony: The One That Exceeds the Concept of Levels") is a Japanese light novel series written by Ichika Isshiki and illustrated by fame. Isshiki started publishing the series on the user-generated novel publishing website Shōsetsuka ni Narō in January 2017 and it was later moved to Kakuyomu in March 2022. The first novel volume was released in November 2017. A manga adaptation, illustrated by Daisuke Takino, started in Micro Magazine's online magazine Comic Ride in March 2018. An anime television series adaptation produced by A.C.G.T aired from October to December 2023. A second season is set to premiere in April 2027.

== Plot ==
Fate Graphite is a gate keeper who works for a noble family, but gets humiliated because he has a useless skill. Later, he kills a bandit and discovers that his skill "Gluttony" has a secret ability that allows him to grow stronger by absorbing other skills. From there, he leaves the noble family he works for and begins his journey to grow stronger and get back at those who humiliated him. Along the way, he discovers a sinister plot involving his own skill, his friends, and his own family's lineage.

== Characters ==
Fate Graphite (フェイト・グラファイト, Feito Gurafaito)
Voiced by: Ryōta Ōsaka (Japanese); Garret Storms (English)
A young man with the "Gluttony" skill, one of the seven skills based on the Seven Deadly Sins. He was mistreated by the Holy Knights until he was taken in by Roxy of the Hart Family, to which he currently works for.
Greed (グリード, Gurīdo)
Voiced by: Tomokazu Seki (Japanese); Chris Gardner (English)
A sword with the "Greed" skill, one of the Seven Deadly Sins skills. He is partnered with Fate.
Roxy Hart (ロキシー・ハート, Rokishī Hāto)
Voiced by: Hisako Tōjō (Japanese); Emily Hornsby (English)
A young woman and a Holy Knight.
Myne (マイン, Main)
Voiced by: Misato Matsuoka (Japanese); Celeste Perez (English)
A woman with the "Wrath" skill. She wields an ax with the "Sloth" skill.
Eris Seifort (エリス・セイファート, Erisu Seifāto)
Voiced by: Hitomi Sekine
A woman with the "Lust" skill

== Media ==
=== Light novel ===
Written by Ichika Isshiki, Berserk of Gluttony started on the user-generated novel publishing website Shōsetsuka ni Narō on January 24, 2017. Isshiki published the 218th and last chapter on Shōsetsuka ni Narō in March 2022 and the series was then transferred to Kakuyomu. The first novel volume, with illustrations by fame, was published by Micro Magazine, under their GC Novels imprint, on November 30, 2017. As of October 28, 2022, eight volumes have been released.

In North America, Seven Seas Entertainment announced that they had licensed the novels in July 2020.

No.	Original release date	Original ISBN	English release date	English ISBN
1	November 30, 2017	978-4-89637-672-2	October 29, 2020 (digital); January 5, 2021 (physical)	978-1-64827-068-0
2	April 28, 2018	978-4-89637-745-3	February 11, 2021 (digital); April 6, 2021 (physical)	978-1-64827-086-4
3	September 28, 2018	978-4-89637-818-4	June 10, 2021 (digital); July 13, 2021 (physical)	978-1-64827-242-4
4	April 27, 2019	978-4-89637-876-4	September 30, 2021 (digital); November 2, 2021 (physical)	978-1-64827-338-4
5	July 31, 2019	978-4-89637-906-8	January 27, 2022 (digital); March 1, 2022 (physical)	978-1-63858-127-7
6	December 26, 2019	978-4-89637-955-6	April 7, 2022 (digital); May 31, 2022 (physical)	978-1-63858-228-1
7	August 31, 2020	978-4-86716-045-9	August 4, 2022 (digital); October 11, 2022 (physical)	978-1-64827-338-4
8	October 28, 2022	978-4-86716-356-6	January 11, 2024 (digital); February 6, 2024 (physical)	978-1-63858-762-0

=== Manga ===
A manga adaptation, illustrated by Daisuke Takino, started on Micro Magazine's online magazine Comic Ride on March 1, 2018. Micro Magazine released the first tankōbon volume on September 28, 2018. As of April 28, 2026, fifteen volumes have been released.

In North America, Seven Seas Entertainment announced that they had licensed the manga in July 2020.

No.	Original release date	Original ISBN	English release date	English ISBN
1	September 28, 2018	978-4-89637-822-1	March 2, 2021	978-1-64827-076-5
2	February 28, 2019	978-4-89637-858-0	March 25, 2021	978-1-64827-208-0
3	July 28, 2019	978-4-89637-904-4	July 27, 2021	978-1-64827-271-4
4	January 30, 2020	978-4-89637-978-5	December 21, 2021	978-1-64827-372-8
5	June 30, 2020	978-4-86716-026-8	June 4, 2022	978-1-63858-139-0
6	November 30, 2020	978-4-86716-087-9	July 12, 2022	978-1-63858-231-1
7	June 29, 2021	978-4-86716-153-1	December 27, 2022	978-1-63858-710-1
8	December 25, 2021	978-4-86716-223-1	July 4, 2023	978-1-68579-468-2
9	October 31, 2022	978-4-86716-351-1	December 26, 2023	979-8-88843-087-3
10	April 27, 2023	978-4-86716-417-4	July 2, 2024	979-8-88843-799-5
11	October 31, 2023	978-4-86716-485-3	December 10, 2024	979-8-89160-516-9
12	July 31, 2024	978-4-86716-609-3	June 10, 2025	979-8-89373-295-5
13	February 27, 2025	978-4-86716-715-1	December 30, 2025	979-8-89561-657-4
14	September 29, 2025	978-4-86716-838-7	June 16, 2026	979-8-89765-324-9
15	April 28, 2026	978-4-86716-949-0	—	—
16	November 27, 2026	978-4-82500-072-8	—	—

=== Anime ===
In October 2022, it was announced that the series would receive an anime television series adaptation. The series is animated by A.C.G.T and directed by Tetsuya Yanagisawa, with scripts supervised by Mariko Kunisawa, and characters designed by Takafumi Furusawa. The series aired from October 5 to December 21, 2023, on Tokyo MX, SUN and BS11. (Note: Tokyo MX lists the series premiere on October 4 at 25:30, which is effectively October 5 at 1:30 a.m. JST.) Both the opening theme song, "Jekyll & Hyde", and the ending theme song, "Ao no Genseki" (青の原石), are performed by EverdreaM.

On April 27, 2026, it was announced that the series would receive a second season. For the second season, Yanagisawa will serve as the chief director, while Kenichi Ishikura will direct it. It is set to premiere in April 2027.

Crunchyroll streamed the series worldwide outside of East Asia, and Muse Communication licensed the series for South Asia and Southeast Asia.

==== Episodes ====
No.	Title	Directed by	Written by	Storyboarded by	Original release date (Note: Episodes are released on select platforms (such as U-NEXT and Crunchyroll) three days before their air dates on television.)
1	"The Have-Nots"; Transliteration: "Motazarumono" (Japanese: 持たざる者)	Tetsuya Yanagisawa	Mariko Kunisawa	Tetsuya Yanagisawa	October 5, 2023
Fate Graphite is a poor gatekeeper for the Vlerick family whose three children Hado, Memil and Rafale, bully him due to their status as holy knights. Unfortunately Fates only skill is Gluttony that does nothing except leave him starving permanently. The only one to show him kindness is holy knight Roxy Hart. Bandits rob the Vlerick house and Fate ends up killing one. To his shock Gluttony consumes the bandit's soul, increasing Fates strength and granting him the bandits skills in Appraisal and Telepathy. Roxy offers to hire him to her Hart family, but he is too scared to leave. Suspecting Gluttony might be useful after all Fate buys a rusty black sword, realizing with Telepathy it is the living magic sword Greed. Rafale is revealed to be researching immortality. With Greeds help Fate slays a goblin pack, absorbing their strength and skills. Greed advises keeping Gluttony secret as it is a forbidden skill that goes against Divine Law. On his way home Telepathy reveals an adventurer named Kasim Black kidnapping a young girl to sell to corrupt holy knights for sexual slavery. Despite not knowing how strong the adventurer might be, Fate follows him to save the girl.
2	"Hunger Boost"; Transliteration: "Kiga Būsuto" (Japanese: 飢餓ブースト)	Kiyoshi Murayama	Mariko Kunisawa	Tetsuya Yanagisawa	October 12, 2023
Fate defeats Kasim and learns it was Hado planning to buy the girl, Sahara, whom Fate returns to her orphanage. Fate decides to accept the job working for Roxy. Lord Hart dies in battle so his title passes to Roxy as Commander of the Holy Knights, though many doubt she will be capable in the role. Fate begins work as a servant with Roxy taking a more than casual interest in him, earning disapproval from head maid Haru. Fate's starvation returns, only now it turns his eyes red. Greed reveals now Gluttony has consumed a soul it will crave them constantly, meaning Fate must kill regularly or Gluttony will starve him to death or send him on a mindless rampage. The red eyes are Hunger-Boost, a unique skill that makes him a more skilled hunter/killer until Gluttony is fed. Fate slays goblins, hobgoblins and a Goblin King from whom he steals Health-Regeneration to heal injuries almost instantly. In exchange for some of his strength, Greed also levels up and unlocks a new form, a bow that never misses. Fate anonymously donates the Goblin King's loot to the orphanage to help Sahara and her friends.
3	"Roxy's Inspection"; Transliteration: "Rokishī no Shisatsu" (Japanese: ロキシーの視察)	Kiyoshi Murayama	Mariko Kunisawa	Nobuharu Kamanaka	October 19, 2023
Roxy visits town disguised as a commoner with Fate as her guard. She notes his sword needs maintenance. Roxy sees for herself the holy knight Anthony Elm bullying people. To prevent Anthony recognizing Roxy Fate improvises they are lovers arguing, then disappear into the crowd. Via Telepathy Fate can tell Roxy enjoys holding his hand. Fate realizes Roxy is looking for information on a suspected Lich that slaughtered 100 goblins and a Goblin-King, panicking the whole city. Fate panics at the thought of knights patrolling the forests as it will become difficult to feed Gluttony without being seen. Roxy is eventually discovered and deeply saddened people automatically treat her with fear when it is her job to protect them. After visiting a blacksmith to clean Greed Roxy is angered the Vlericks planned to hunt the supposed Lich without informing her. They encounter the Vlerick siblings tormenting a lost child and leave irritated when Roxy confronts them. Helping the boy find his mother Fate is reminded of a knight resembling Roxy who helped him after his father died. They return home and are thoroughly scolded by Haru. Needing a way to hunt without being seen Fate secretly acquires a magic mask. The Vlericks and other knights gather in secret to discuss a place called Galia.
4	"Crowned Beast"; Transliteration: "Kanmuri Mamono" (Japanese: 冠魔物)	Kiyoshi Murayama	Mariko Kunisawa	Katsuhiko Nishijima	October 26, 2023
Due to repeated hunting trips, Fate becomes known as Corpse Lich. Roxy invites Fate to the Hart vineyards to meet her mother, Lady Aisha, who recognizes their mutual crush. Fate learns Kobolds always attack the vineyards. He encounters a red eyed Galian girl hunting the Kobolds, but she cryptically warns he is still immature and needs to kill the Kobolds more than she does. Roxy recognizes her as being from the Galian region where her father died. Roxy leads the Kobold hunt, unaware one has evolved into a Crowned Kobold. Fate decides to hunt it at night so Roxy won't be endangered. After killing it, Gluttony goes berserk from such a high quality soul and Fate fights to keep it under control. Roxy discovers the dead Kobolds and suspects the Galian girl. Aisha, who will soon die of chronic illness, secretly charges Fate with supporting Roxy after her death. Fate agrees but feels unworthy. Slaying goblins no longer satisfies Gluttony and Hunger-Boost turns one eye red all the time, requiring hiding under an eye patch. Hado is chosen to hunt for Corpse Lich while Roxy, due to the Vlerick's scheming, is chosen to go to Galia to finish the mission that killed her father. Fate begs her to refuse such an obvious plot against her life, but she agrees to go. Rafale and Memil travel to Tenburn to continue researching immortality. Powerless against their corruption Fate does the only thing he can; on his next hunt he lets Hado find him, intending to kill him in revenge.
5	"To Galia"; Transliteration: "Garia e" (Japanese: ガリアへ)	Kiyoshi Murayama	Mariko Kunisawa	Nobuharu Kamanaka	November 2, 2023
Fate reveals his identity to Hado, destroys his holy sword, beats him severely, severs his arms and legs and then kills him, stealing his skill Holy Sword Technique, which makes Fate a Holy Knight automatically by law. Greed levels up and unlocks a scythe form. Roxy departs for her mission to slay the Divine Dragon, which will take 3 years even if she survives. Fate decides to follow her in secret. As well as soldiers, Roxy is joined by volunteers Miria and Morgan. Morgan's daughter, Raine, is a researcher studying the victims of Corpse Lich, learning the weapon used is undoubtedly one of the Weapons of Mortal Sin. While heading for Galia, Fate rests at a shipping port and encounters Set, his childhood bully, desperately seeking warriors to protect their village from monsters. Fate almost refuses since the villagers exiled him after his father Dean died, but relents since Gluttony requires feeding soon. Set's father, the Chief, remembers Fate and decides he might at least be useful as a sacrifice to the monsters. Set, who has matured since their childhood, rejects this as barbaric and takes Fate into his own home, since the monsters recently killed his wife. Fate passes out, Set's young daughter having been tricked by the Chief to offer Fate a drugged sweet.
6	"The Girl of Wrath"; Transliteration: "Ikari no shōjo" (Japanese: 怒りの少女)	Kiyoshi Murayama	Mariko Kunisawa	You Nakano	November 9, 2023
The wyverns attack the village and kills everyone, including the Chief. Set is able to wake Fate, who quickly slays the wyverns, stealing skills Fireball and Fire Resistance. Since the village is burned down, Set decides to start a new life in the city with his daughter and makes amends with Fate. Fate visits Dean's grave then finds work guarding a travelling merchant to catch up to Roxy and her soldiers at Lanchester city. On the way, they encounter the Gallian girl, Myne. She reveals her axe is the Mortal Weapon Sloth and that like Fate suffering from Gluttony and starvation, she suffers from Wrath and narcolepsy. Fate arrives in Lanchester before Roxy and must wait for her. Fate learns everyone in Lanchester possesses tattoos denoting their place in society, enforced by Lord Rudolph, who executes people daily. Greed has met Myne and Sloth before. He admits to Fate there are seven Mortal Weapons and seven Mortal Skills, of which Gluttony is most sinful as its ability to accumulate skills could make the wielder stronger than God, or send them insane. Fate learns to feed Gluttony just enough souls to prevent insanity and kills a Sand Golem, stealing the skill Sandstorm. Lanchester soldiers see him in his mask so to hide his identity he introduces himself as Corpse. Rudolph demands "Corpse" serve him or be executed. Myne hits him so hard he flies out of the city into the desert, requiring her and "Corpse" to flee Lanchester as wanted criminals.
7	"The Twilight Swordsman"; Transliteration: "Tasogare no kishi" (Japanese: 黄昏の騎士)	Shigeru Ueda	Mariko Kunisawa	You Nakano	November 16, 2023
Fate and Myne explore Hausen village. The chief, retired holy knight Aaron Barbatos, offers Fate training as he clearly uses his strength inefficiently. Fate enters Hunger-Boost again and detects monsters inside Hausen castle. After completing Aaron's training Fate asks about the castle. Aaron reveals he once owned the castle but during his absence his wife and son were killed by a Lich Lord, which now inhabits the castle. Aaron decides to confront Lich Lord with Fate while Myne protects the village in exchange for gold. Inside they find Aaron's reanimated family and his son Rook attacks him for failing to protect them. Fate cannot interfere as him killing them would consume their innocent souls. Instead he destroys Lich Lord with Rook's sword, freeing their souls safely while only consuming Lich Lord. Aaron pays Myne who claims she is gathering funds to rebuild Galia. This reminds Aaron he met Myne in his youth 50 years ago. Myne confirms she is much older than that as she is cursed to never die. Meanwhile, Rafale and Memil successfully locate a Philosopher Stone, bringing immortality one step closer. Returning home they are furious to learn of Hado's murder, not by a monster, but by a human warrior known only as Corpse.
8	"The Village of Lost Memories"; Transliteration: "Bōkyaku no Mura" (Japanese: 忘却の村)	Kiyoshi Murayama	Mariko Kunisawa	You Nakano	November 23, 2023
Roxy and her team pass Hausen where Roxy is surprised to learn Aaron is her godfather. Roxy is curious who defeated Lich Lord but Aaron keeps it secret by Fate's request. Aaron offers Roxy his training. Myne takes Fate to the city where she was born to kill the monster Haniel, a weaponised chimera created by Galia's government. It is still an infant inside its cocoon but is capable of resurrecting eternally while its soul is intact, so she needs Fate to devour the soul. Haniel's heart is a Galian girl, making Fate uneasy, but Myne assures him the girl was a monster even before fusing with Haniel. After a difficult fight Fate kills the girl. As he devours her soul Fate feels a great sorrow, which Greed reveals is caused by having killed a family member as the girl was undoubtedly related to Myne, who in turn is now Fate's sister via wielding Mortal Weapons. Burying the girl Fate asks Myne to kill him herself if he ever goes insane. Greed levels up again and gains a shield form. Fate and Myne part ways to fulfil their separate goals. Fate enters Babylon, a fortress city that separates Galia from the kingdom. Fate learns Roxy has taken her father's place as commander of Babylon. Via Telepathy he senses someone in the crowd with murderous intentions for Roxy.
9	"The Guardian of Lust"; Transliteration: "Shikiyoku no Shugosha" (Japanese: 色欲の守護者)	Shigeru Ueda	Mariko Kunisawa	Katsuhiko Nishijima	November 30, 2023
Roxy takes over from her father's temporary replacement, Northern. Greed demands a proper scabbard from equipment craftsman Jade, but it costs 500 gold, so Fate must earn money and hunts a large orc pack. Hunters accuse him of stealing their kills, forcing Fate to beat them up. Roxy appears but doesn't recognise Fate under his skull mask. She accepts his excuse of self-defence and lets him go. News of the fight spreads so Jade insists on providing Fate's equipment for half price so his growing fame acts as advertising for his shop. Fate buys armour but still can't afford the scabbard. Fate encounters Eris, who holds the Deadly Sin of Lust. She has followed him ever since he unlocked Gluttony, and she knows Myne. She reveals the existence of Hate, a force that accumulates around death and suffering and leads to the birth of Crowned Monsters. The same is true of humans who have accumulated vast amounts of Hate from the abuse of holy knights towards commoners. Her goal is the birth of a Crowned Human who will protect the kingdom; so she plans to assassinate the only holy knight beloved by the commoners, Roxy. The resulting explosion of Hate would definitely trigger a Crowned Human to appear. Fate storms out, enraged by Eris' plan and determined to protect Roxy.
10	"Trap"; Transliteration: "Wana" (Japanese: 罠)	Kiyoshi Murayama	Mariko Kunisawa	You Nakano	December 7, 2023
A squad of soldiers go missing in Galia so Roxy gathers a rescue squad. Jade requires duskstone to make Greed's scabbard, so Fate decides to mine it himself in Galia. Once out in the wilderness Fate dreams of the Galian girl who drowns him in his victims blood. He awakens and spots salamanders attacking Roxy's camp. Fate rescues them in his Corpse mask and determines the salamanders were enchanted to kill Roxy, so he escorts them to their shared destination, Great Canyon. Fate spies Eris inspecting dormant chimera bodies. Soon after Roxy is attacked by chimeras considerably weaker than Haniel as their cores are orcs. Fate finds fighting alongside Roxy feels natural, almost fun, as he helps Roxy kill the chimeras. A sinkhole opens beneath them that drops them into a cave. As they recover Roxy feels Corpse reminds her of Fate. Fate is thrilled Roxy remembers him but still keeps his identity hidden. Gluttony suddenly activates, requiring him to kill. Hiding his eyes from Roxy in shame he leaves her and quickly slays the last chimera in a frenzy of self-loathing. With Gluttony satisfied he determines the chimeras were also enchanted, which he is sure was done by Eris. The cave collapses further, luckily revealing a deposit of duskstone. Elsewhere, a man with a similar mask to Fate's appears.
11	"Death March"; Transliteration: "Shi no Kōshin" (Japanese: 死の行進)	Hiroaki Takagi	Mariko Kunisawa	Hiroaki Takagi	December 14, 2023
A month later Roxy confronts Fate who, since he keeps being challenged to duels, has injured 57 men. Fate loses when he sees she wears a necklace made of a jewel he gave her. Roxy recognises he used Aaron's sword style and must be the cursed man Aaron mentioned. Morgans daughter Raine learns Rafale has the Philosophers Stone and fears what he might do with it. A monster stampede called a Death March approaches Babylon. Fate is forced to leave it to Roxy while he focuses on a monster trying to ambush Roxy's army, Crowned Slime. Slime is being controlled by the other masked warrior, wielding Mortal Weapon Envy the Black Gun-blade. After defeating Slime Fate finds his stats are now completely maxed out for a human; any further increases will put him beyond, into a place known as Domain of E where only inhumans can survive. The warrior is immune to Fate's attacks as he has already progressed to Domain of E. Fate willingly enters Domain of E and fights the warrior as equals, destroys his mask, and finds it is Roxy's subordinate Northern. Northern uses a whistle to summon Divine Dragon that killed Roxy's father and sends it to kill Roxy. Fate saves Roxy at the last second, but his mask is destroyed and Roxy finally sees he is Fate.
12	"Devouring"; Transliteration: "Kuitsukusu" (Japanese: 喰い尽くす)	Kiyoshi Murayama	Mariko Kunisawa	Tetsuya Yanagisawa	December 21, 2023
Northern severs Fate's left arm but Fate stabs him in the back, having used an illusion skill, and devours his soul. He suddenly enters a dream world where the Galian girl, Luna, informs him for freeing her from Haniel she has been suppressing Gluttony for him, but if he devours Divine Dragon he will go irreversibly insane. Fate slays Divine Dragon anyway to protect Roxy. He transfers his power to Greed, unlocking a magic staff form and ensuring when he goes insane he'll be too weak to hurt anyone. As promised, Myne arrives to kill him but Roxy stops her. Somehow Roxy's presence calms Gluttony, so Fate merely passes out and awakens a week later. Eris and Myne explain Envy had been mind-controlling Northern, so they hid Envy deep inside Galia away from humans. Eris has abandoned her Crowned Human plan but needs Fate's help for her next goal. Fate agrees to go with her as he can feel Gluttony now has some twisted interest in Roxy. He leaves Roxy a letter explaining everything. With Divine Dragon dead Roxy returns home to the capital. Rafale is shown going mad from exposure to the Philosopher Stone. Greed's magic staff form regenerates Fate's missing arm. Eris promises to see him in the capital after he has regrown his power from zero, having given all his existing power to Greed. As Fate sets out to begin hunting monsters again, Greed demands an even finer scabbard to celebrate reaching Domain of E.

== Reception ==
The manga won the second Rakuten Kobo's E-book Award in the "Isekai Comic" category in 2024.

== See also ==
- The Most Notorious "Talker" Runs the World's Greatest Clan, another light novel series with the same illustrator
