= Goodbye, Dragon Life =

Japanese light novel series

- First light novel volume cover

さようなら竜生、こんにちは人生 (Sayōnara Ryūsei, Konnichiwa Jinsei)
- Genre: Fantasy
- Novel series
- Written by: Hiroaki Nagashima
- Published by: Shōsetsuka ni Narō (January 20, 2013–August 31, 2016); AlphaPolis (August 16, 2016–present)
- Original run: January 20, 2013 – present
- Light novel
- Written by: Hiroaki Nagashima
- Illustrated by: Kisuke Ichimaru
- Published by: AlphaPolis
- Original run: April 8, 2015 – present
- Volumes: 27
- Manga
- Written by: Hiroaki Nagashima
- Illustrated by: Kurono
- Published by: AlphaPolis
- English publisher: Alpha Manga
- Original run: December 22, 2015 – present
- Volumes: 15
- Anime television series

Good Bye, Dragon Life
- Directed by: Kenichi Nishida
- Written by: Naokatsu Tsuda
- Music by: Tatsuhiko Saiki; Hanae Nakamura
- Studio: SynergySP; Vega Entertainment
- Licensed by: Crunchyroll
- Original network: TBS, RKK, BS NTV, AT-X
- Original run: October 11, 2024 – December 27, 2024
- Episodes: 12

Goodbye, Dragon Life (さようなら竜生、こんにちは人生, Sayōnara Ryūsei, Konnichiwa Jinsei; lit. 'Goodbye Dragon Life, Hello Human Life') is a Japanese light novel series written by Hiroaki Nagashima and illustrated by Kisuke Ichimaru. It began serialization online in January 2013 on the user-generated novel publishing website Shōsetsuka ni Narō, and it moved to the AlphaPolis website in August 2016. It was also later acquired by AlphaPolis, who have published twenty-seven volumes since April 2015. A manga adaptation with art by Kurono has been serialized online via AlphaPolis' manga website since December 2015 and has been collected in fifteen tankōbon volumes. The manga is published digitally in English through Alpha Manga. An anime television series adaptation produced by SynergySP and Vega Entertainment aired from October to December 2024.

== Characters ==
Dolan (ドラン, Doran)
Voiced by: Shunsuke Takeuchi
A centuries-old divine dragon reincarnated into a young man living at Verun Village.
Celina (セリナ, Serina)
Voiced by: Hitomi Sekine
A lamia whom Dolan encounters at the swamp, he offers her residency at the village.
Christina (クリスティーナ, Kurisutīna)
Voiced by: Ayaka Ōhashi
A knight of nobility
Airi (アイリ)
Voiced by: Akane Matsunaga
A young girl at Verun Village with a crush on Dolan.
Diadora (ディアドラ)
Voiced by: Mikoi Sasaki
A black rose spirit from the Ente forest.
Gio (ギオ, Jio)
Voiced by: Shōya Ishige
Leader of the wood elf militia.
Fio (フィオ)
Voiced by: Yurina Amami
Wood elf, Gio's younger sister.
Marle (マール, Māru)
Voiced by: Madoka Asahina
A fairy.
Geolude (ゲオルード, Georūdo)
Voiced by: Masaaki Mizunaka
A demon.
Raflasia (ラフラシア, Rafurashia)
Voiced by: Yui Ogura
A demon flower spirit. Her flower is the Rafflesia (corpse flower).
Gellen (ゲレン, Geren)
Voiced by: Yukihiro Nozuyama
A demon.
Georg (ゲオルグ, Georugu)
Voiced by: Satoshi Hino
A demon.
Marida (マリーダ, Marīda)
Voiced by: Eriko Matsui
Member of the Berun militia.
Leticia (レティシャ, Retisha)
Voiced by: Misato Matsuoka
A woman who follows the goddess Myrale and claims to be a her direct oracle.
Kalavith (カラヴィス, Karavisu)
Voiced by: Ruri Asano
Like Dolan in his previous life, Kalavith is one of the seven divine dragons.
Myrale (マイラール, Mairāru)
Voiced by: Hisako Kanemoto
A goddess and an old friend of Dolan during his dragon years.

== Media ==
=== Light novels ===
No.	Release date	ISBN
1	April 8, 2015	978-4-43-420426-5
2	June 26, 2015	978-4-43-420769-3
3	September 30, 2015	978-4-43-421116-4
4	December 25, 2015	978-4-43-421513-1
5	March 28, 2016	978-4-43-421770-8
6	June 27, 2016	978-4-43-422115-6
7	September 30, 2016	978-4-43-422441-6
8	January 31, 2017	978-4-43-422954-1
9	May 31, 2017	978-4-43-423376-0
10	August 31, 2017	978-4-43-423723-2
11	November 30, 2017	978-4-43-424022-5
12	February 28, 2018	978-4-43-424339-4
13	June 30, 2018	978-4-43-424810-8
14	October 31, 2018	978-4-43-425281-5
15	January 31, 2019	978-4-43-425593-9
16	May 31, 2019	978-4-43-426058-2
17	September 30, 2019	978-4-43-426516-7
18	December 27, 2019	978-4-43-426887-8
19	June 30, 2020	978-4-43-427240-0
20	February 26, 2021	978-4-43-428552-3
21	August 31, 2021	978-4-43-429268-2
22	December 30, 2021	978-4-43-429729-8
23	December 28, 2022	978-4-43-431344-8
24	March 31, 2024	978-4-43-433599-0
25	September 30, 2024	978-4-43-434513-5
26	December 30, 2024	978-4-43-435013-9
27	March 30, 2026	978-4-43-437462-3

=== Manga ===
No.	Original release date	Original ISBN	English release date	English ISBN
1	January 31, 2017	978-4-43-422798-1	July 28, 2023	—
2	December 31, 2017	978-4-43-423966-3	July 28, 2023	—
3	December 31, 2018	978-4-43-425366-9	July 28, 2023	—
4	December 31, 2019	978-4-43-426773-4	October 27, 2023	—
5	June 30, 2020	978-4-43-427534-0	October 27, 2023	—
6	December 31, 2020	978-4-43-428255-3	October 27, 2023	—
7	July 31, 2021	978-4-43-429126-5	March 29, 2024	—
8	March 31, 2022	978-4-43-430097-4	March 29, 2024	—
9	September 30, 2022	978-4-43-430883-3	October 25, 2024	—
10	April 30, 2023	978-4-43-431930-3	December 20, 2024	—
11	November 30, 2023	978-4-43-432948-7	July 25, 2025	—
12	March 31, 2024	978-4-43-433614-0	—	—
13	September 30, 2024	978-4-43-434496-1	—	—
14	June 30, 2025	978-4-43-435946-0	—	—
15	January 31, 2026	978-4-43-437188-2	—	—
16	May 31, 2026	978-4-43-437815-7	—	—

=== Anime ===
An anime television series adaptation was announced on March 15, 2024. It is produced by SynergySP and Vega Entertainment, and directed by Kenichi Nishida, with Naokatsu Tsuda writing series scripts, Nozomi Kawashige designing the characters, and Tatsuhiko Saiki and Hanae Nakamura composing the music. The series aired from October 11 to December 27, 2024, on TBS and other networks. (Note: TBS lists the series premiere on October 10, 2024, at 25:28, which is effectively October 11 at 1:28 a.m. JST.) The opening theme song is "Together Forever", performed by Lun8, while the ending theme song is "Kimi to Mita Keshiki" (君と見た景色; The View I Saw With You), performed by EverdreaM. Crunchyroll streamed the series under the title Good Bye, Dragon Life.

==== Episodes ====
No.	Title	Directed by	Written by	Storyboarded by	Original release date (Note: Episodes are released on ABEMA and Crunchyroll a week before their televised airings.)
1	"Goodbye, Dragon Life"; Transliteration: "Sayōnara Ryūsei" (Japanese: さようなら竜生)	Ken'ichi Nishida	Naokatsu Tsuda	Ken'ichi Nishida	October 11, 2024
The ancient Dragon is unjustly slain by a human hero, but he accepts his death after such a long life. Unexpectedly, he is reincarnated as new-born baby Dolan in Verun Village of the Arcrest Kingdom. Time passes and on his 15th birthday he starts his own farm. Due to the village lacking enough guards he also does jobs for them when required. A knight named Christina moves into the village. As his older brother Dylan has married, his parents urge him to find a wife too, but he is not interested. Dolan is asked to investigate a nearby swamp where the lizard-people have mysteriously vanished. There he finds the Earth-spirits are making the swamp uninhabitable. He encounters a Lamia named Celina, but due to her inexperience, she fails to charm him and is almost crushed by an enraged Earth-spirit. Dolan rescues her and together they defeat the spirit with Dolan's dragon magic. Celine admits she is on a journey to find a strong husband; since all Lamia are venomous their husbands must be poison resistant. Dolan fails to notice her hints and wishes her well in finding a husband, though as a parting gift, he gives her some of his dragon life energy to help on her journey.
2	"A New Friend"; Transliteration: "Atarashī Nakama" (Japanese: 新しい仲間)	Shigeki Awai	Naokatsu Tsuda	Ken'ichi Nishida	October 18, 2024
Celina fails to find a man since they all run away from her. Dolan struggles to learn medicinal magic from the village healer Maguru, since as a dragon he never got sick before. He also trains in weaponry with Albert. Sensing a monster near the village, he investigates and finds Celina. She admits to her failure and is surprised when he invites her to live in the village, which already contains Beast-kin and Demi-humans. To prepare the villagers for the idea, he has Celina hunt and leave animals as peace offerings, along with evidence of her presence. Unfortunately Captain Balan, Vice-Captain Marida and Priestess Leticia believe Lamia's are dangerous and stay ready to defend the village. Dolan plans to put himself in danger during a hunt and have Celina save him in front of witnesses, proving her kindness. The hunt is interrupted by a dangerous Armour Bear so Celina instead rescues Balan's son Tauro. Balan remains skeptical, until she explains her reasons for wanting to live with humans. The Goddess Myrale abruptly sends Leticia a vision decreeing Celina be allowed to stay. Celina passes out from her wounds, but is treated by Maguru and given a house of her own.
3	"The Knight Girl"; Transliteration: "Onna-Kenshi" (Japanese: 女剣士)	Mayu Numayama	An'na Kawahara	Mayu Numayama	October 25, 2024
Dolan separates his spirit from his body and goes to visit Goddess Myrale, who is in fact one of his oldest friends. She is pleased that he has found happiness as a human. Christina sends letters to Headmistress Olivia of Galoa City's Magic Academy with news of her life in the village. Christina often feels lonely, until she becomes friends with Celina and Dolan. She also defeats Balan in a drinking game, seeing who can drink the most of his wife Miu's breastmilk, which as a Cow-woman she shares with the village. As a prize, Christina is allowed to try their daughter Mir's milk, having grown old enough to start producing her own. Olivia is pleased by the news from Christina, but word of Celina's existence reaches Government Commissioner Gouda, who ignores Myrale's blessing of Celina and insists she be interrogated. She agrees but Dolan insists on accompanying her. Christina is furious and asks Olivia to intervene. Olivia explains Celina is in no physical danger due to having Myrale's blessing, but Gouda's superior Keiren, a Sorceress for the Government-general, suspects Celina is involved in the disappearance of women from Galoa, despite this being impossible due to Verun village being so far away from the city.
4	"A Witch"; Transliteration: "Majo" (Japanese: 魔女)	Matsuo Asami	An'na Kawahara	Ken'ichi Nishida	November 1, 2024
Gouda delivers Celina and Dolan to Keiren, who claims she now believes Celina is innocent. Gouda visits Olivia and Christina with his suspicions it is Keiren kidnapping the missing women and using them to extend her lifespan and lured Celina to do the same to her. Keiren drugs Dolan and Celina, but Dolan wakes up just as Keiren is preparing to dissect Celina. Keiren admits she has killed hundreds of women from many species to enhance her own beauty. Gouda bursts in with Olivia, Christina and his soldiers, having overheard everything. Keiren justifies her crimes as necessary; she was born ugly and became obsessed with stealing beauty. After encountering a certain group of individuals she was given even more victims. Keiren transforms into a grotesque monster, Christina fights her, but regenerates from her attacks. However, Dolan manages to kill Keiren with his powers. Despite it being self-defense, Celina is temporarily confined for using forbidden Evil-Eye magic, so Dolan begins teaching her to read. Gouda provides Celina with citizenship so she can live freely in Verun. Celina visits the city, but the people treat her with fear, so she asks to return to Verun. Maguru's son Denzel, who works for Gouda, asks Dolan to consider joining Magic Academy. Dolan refuses, but as they return home starts to consider what the Academy might teach him. Elsewhere, a demonic portal releases an army of monster ants into the forest.
5	"The Forest of Ente"; Transliteration: "Ente no Mori" (Japanese: エンテの森)	Ken'ichi Nishida	Naohiro Fukushima	Mashami Watanabe	November 8, 2024
The ants begin massacring the Wood Elf tribe that live within the forest. Celina worries Dolan will join the Academy and leave her behind. Christina decides to clear the woods of predators with Dolan, Celina and Balan. One of the ants appears and injures Balan. Dolan identifies the ant as a Zert demon. Dolan and Christina kill the Zert and Dolan asks her to keep it secret that it was a demon. Maguru is not fooled as Balan's injuries could not have been caused by a normal monster. Dolan convinces Maguru to let him investigate with Celina. Christina is forbidden from volunteering by the village Elder as Gouda had insisted the village ensure her safety, but she disobeys and follows them anyway. Christina discovers some monsters are friendly but starving, having been driven from their territories by the Zert. A Fairy named Merl suddenly appears, fleeing the Zert which they kill, though Dolan is forced to rely on his dragon abilities and is relieved when the girls don't notice. Celina is embarrassed when Dolan compliments her. From Merl's description of the Zert's behavior, Dolan realizes they are scouts preparing the way before even more powerful demons arrive. They are suddenly surrounded by the elves.
6	"Visitors from the Dark"; Transliteration: "Yami yori no Raihōsha" (Japanese: 闇よりの来訪者)	Yūichi Satō	Naohiro Fukushima	Kunihisa Sugishima	November 15, 2024
Elf leader Gio thanks them for saving Merl and is convinced to let them stay in the forest to combat the Zert. Dolan secretly plans to find and destroy whatever portal the Zert came from to stop their masters from coming through too. Unfortunately, at that moment the portal opens even wider, allowing three Demon Knights to enter the forest and begin searching for the Ente Yggdrasil for their master. Dolan's group and the elves rush back to the elf village, killing many Zert along the way. Demon Knight Geolude attacks the village first but is restrained by Diadora, a Black Rose forest spirit. Geolude is saved from instant death by Demon Knight Raflasia, a spirit of the Raflaora demon flower that feeds on blood and rot. Against her, Diadora's power over life and nature simply withers away. Despite this, Diadora wounds Raflasia's face. Raflasia and Geolude overpower Diadora and are about to kill her when Dolan explosively appears and saves her life.
7	"Melee"; Transliteration: "Ransen" (Japanese: 乱戦)	Mayu Numayama	Naohiro Fukushima	Mayu Numayama	November 22, 2024
Celina and Christina arrive and Dolan exposes the third Demon Knight Gellen hiding nearby. Georg, the fourth Demon Knight, suddenly appears, his extremely dense mana having made him move slower through the portal. Christina saves Celina from Geolude, who senses she is a Superhuman. Celina fails to fight Gellen, who mocks her for lacking any killing intent. Georg fights Dolan, about whom Georg senses something inhuman, but isn't sure what. Dolan senses Georg isn't a demon but a Fallen God. Dolan worries it might take dragon mana to defeat Georg, as he cannot defeat him as a human, but still fears exposing his former identity. Geolude and Raflasia attack Dolan as well, so he is forced to blast them away with dragon mana disguised as a wind spell. Georg uses an ultimate attack, Three Demonic Light Blades, which Dolan deflects with dragon mana. Impressed, Georg agrees to leave for three days but tells the elves to choose; die or join the demon army. As Georg flies away it is suggested he has realized who Dolan really is. Gio takes them to the forests various tribal chiefs; Dio the elf, Vlaic the Wolfman and Alsienne the Arachne. As she is from the elf village they are also joined by Olivia.
8	"The Night Before the Battle"; Transliteration: "Kessen Zenya" (Japanese: 決戦前夜)	Shigeki Awai	Naohiro Fukushima	Ken'ichi Nishida	November 29, 2024
Dio explains that, rather than wait three days, they will attack the portal tomorrow, since once it is destroyed, the demons will be forced back to their demonic realm. Dolan, Celina and Christina volunteer to help. Raflasia and Geolude are furious Dolan and the others resisted them. Georg is now certain Dolan is the Ancient Dragon that destroyed the demon army and is excited to fight him. Dolan realizes Diadora's injuries from Raflasia aren't healing, so he heals them for her. Diadora is determined to avenge all the forest spirits murdered by Raflasia. Overnight Dolan realizes how terrified Celina is for the battle. Celina admits it is not the battle itself, but her inability to kill. Dolan gives her a crystal bracelet he charmed himself to protect her. Christina joins them to watch the moonlight and Celina decides to stop holding back. Christina asks Dolan about Superhumans, but Dolan claims he has never heard of them. The next morning, it is decided the elves, Beastmen and Arachne's will clear a path to the portal so Dolan, Celina and Christina can confront the Demon Knights. Along the way, Celina sees the elves are in trouble and abandons the plan to help them.
9	"The Battle of the Demonic Realm Portal"; Transliteration: "Makai-mon no Kōbō" (Japanese: 魔界門の攻防)	Yūtarō Tanii	Naokatsu Tsuda	Ken'ichi Nishida	December 6, 2024
Celina joins the elves to fight Gellen while Diaodora confronts Raflasia. Christina stops to help the Arachnes and Beastmen fight Geolude, leaving Dolan to fight Georg alone. Using Raflasia's overconfidence, Diadora allows Raflasia to begin absorbing all of her life energy, unaware she had planted seeds from a black rose in Raflasia's body during their last duel. The sudden rush of Diadora's life energy causes the seeds to bloom into roses, tearing Raflasia apart and killing her. Dolan appears on his way to the portal and rescues Diadora, who sees his dragon wings and realizes he is a human with a dragon soul. Celina is impaled by a tree branch whilst fighting Gellen and is surprised when Dolan's bracelet heals her injury. Geolude explains to Christina that Superhumans are actually an extremely rare type of monster that resemble humans but with far superior abilities. This causes normal humans to unconsciously reject them, dooming them to lives of loneliness. This included the previous hero, who used his power as a superhuman to slay the Ancient Dragon. Realizing she possesses the same power as a hero, Christina severs Geolude's head. Dolan confronts Georg at the portal and accepts his invitation to enter the Demonic Realm where they can fight with their full powers without holding back.
10	"Decisive Battle"; Transliteration: "Kessen" (Japanese: 決戦)	Yūichi Satō	Naokatsu Tsuda	Ken'ichi Nishida	December 13, 2024
Celina is able to use all the power from Dolan's crystal and summon demonic snakes that devour Gellen. Everyone gathers outside the portal, but cannot decide whether to destroy it immediately or wait and hope Dolan makes it back. Olivia finds a strange crystal where Dolan healed Diadora. The decision is almost made to destroy the portal, but Dolan's friends are able to convince the others to wait. Dolan easily defeats Georg, who dies happy that Dolan praised his skills as a warrior. Dolan's victory draws the attention of a demon woman who recognizes him as the former Ancient Dragon. Dolan returns to the forest and destroys the portal. The elves host a massive celebration and Celina is thrilled when Dolan asks her to dance. Celina eventually falls asleep and Dolan is lured away by Christina singing a song passed down by her ancestors, telling of an ancient dragon who helped a hero defeat a great evil dragon. Unfortunately, the song is all Christina knows and there is no more information, which Dolan finds disappointing. Despite the tragic end to the song, Dolan tells Christina he is confident the ancient dragon treasured his friendship with the hero. The next day, Diadora gifts Dolan some black rose seeds and kisses him goodbye, to Celina's considerable irritation. They return to their village, but as Dolan returns to his house alone, he is suddenly stabbed in the back.
11	"The People Saying Goodbye"; Transliteration: "Sari yuku Hitobito" (Japanese: 去りゆく人々)	Mayu Numayama	An'na Kawahara	Mayu Numayama	December 20, 2024
Dolan awakens uninjured with no memory of being attacked. A flashback shows every living dragon is descended from a single Progenitor Dragon who divided himself into pieces to form his dragon children Hyperion, Vritra, Jormungand, Alexander, Leviathan, Bahamut, and Dolan. Dolan is shocked when the village elders inexplicably decide to abandon the village and find new homes. Dolan insists on staying and so is forced to watch as everyone starts to move away, including his parents and brother. Christina leads the remaining villagers in burning down Dolan's farm, claiming the others only left because they noticed Dolan isn't normal and don't want to live around him anymore. When even Celina plans to leave Dolan passes out. He awakens as a dragon again and starts to question whether being reborn as a human was all just a strange dream. Christina's voice continues to torment him with his failures. On the verge of going mad, Celina suddenly appears before him happy to see him. They talk until Celina falls asleep and disappears. This causes Dolan to realizes Celina was actually asleep and talking to him in her dreams, meaning he is currently trapped in a nightmare created by his oldest enemy, the fallen Goddess of Destruction Al la Kalavith.
12	"Hello, Human Life"; Transliteration: "Konnichiwa Jinsei" (Japanese: こんにちは人生)	Ken'ichi Nishida	An'na Kawahara	Ken'ichi Nishida	December 27, 2024
Kalavith reveals she was punishing Dolan for dying. Dolan explains as a dragon he had no resolve to live, but as a human he lives for his friends. After defeating Kalavith he reveals other gods cursed him; the more he reincarnates the more his soul will degrade until it disappears. Kalavith is unhappy and allows him to leave. Dolan tells Christina he will enrol in magic academy. Dolan sits the entrance exam which he easily passes. Celina is upset by Dolan's absence and realises she has been in love with him all along, but as being together is almost impossible she decides to leave to continue searching for a husband. Dolan returns to Verun but finds Celina has already left. Racing after her he explains students can take familiars with them, so if Celina forms a familiar pact with him she can attend the academy too. She refuses, fearing she would taint his reputation, but Dolan insists he wants to experience life with her. Celina agrees and they form a familiar pact. After an emotional goodbye to the villagers they and Christina depart. Celina can't wait for her and Dolan to become lovers, only to realise Dolan never actually asked her to marry him. She cheers up when Dolan plans to visit the lamia village one day.
