= Misato Matsuoka =

Japanese voice actress and singer

- 松岡 美里
- Born: 23 March 2001 (age 25); Hyōgo Prefecture, Japan
- Occupations: Voice actress; singer
- Years active: 2020–present
- Employer: I'm Enterprise

Misato Matsuoka (Japanese: 松岡 美里, Hepburn: Matsuoka Misato; born 23 March 2001) is a Japanese voice actress and singer affiliated with I'm Enterprise, and is also a member of J-Pop unit duo, EverdreaM. She is known for voicing Tsubame Mizusaki in Keep Your Hands Off Eizouken!, Jerietta in I'm Quitting Heroing, Kyo Nekozaki in Shikimori's Not Just a Cutie, Tsubaki in Rokudo's Bad Girls, Tanino Gimlet in Umamusume: Pretty Derby and Uta Sakura/Cure Idol in You and Idol Pretty Cure. She is also a member of the singing duo EverdreaM.

== Early life ==
Matsuoka, a native of Hyōgo Prefecture, graduated at the Japan Narration Acting Institute. In 2017, she joined I'm Enterprise.

== Career ==
=== Early voice acting career ===
In January 2020, Matsuoka played Tsubame Mizusaki, one of the main characters in Keep Your Hands Off Eizouken!. In October 2020, she played Shimakku – a member of Zerotickholic – one of the bands in Show By Rock!! Fes A Live. In February 2021, Matsuoka played Mihesher Hence in Mobile Suit Gundam: Hathaway's Flash.

In January 2022, Matsuoka played Kyo Nekozaki in Shikimori's Not Just a Cutie. In April 2022, she played Jerietta in I'm Quitting Heroing. In May 2022, Matsuoka played Tanino Gimlet in Umamusume: Pretty Derby at the series' "4th Event Special Dreamers!!" event in Pia Arena MM in Yokohama.

In January 2023, Matsuoka played as Tsubaki in Rokudo's Bad Girls. In February 2023, she played Anzu in Heavenly Delusion. In June 2023, she was cast as Rei "Reirei" Konoe in Harmony of Mille-Feuille. In August 2023, Matsuoka played Uta Kirishima in The Yuzuki Family's Four Sons and Myne in Berserk of Gluttony.

== Personal life ==
Matsuoka and Hitomi Sekine formed the rock singing duo Everdream.

While being picked to provide the voice of Uta Sakura from You and Idol Pretty Cure, Matsuoka stated that she has been fan of the franchise since childhood. The staff kept this a surprise and Matsuoka hoped her role as Uta could reach out to children who could share the same admiration she had for the franchise. Matsuoka, who has always wanted to voice a lead Cure and is known for her singing ability, has envisioned it on a paper for five years.

== Filmography ==
=== Anime television ===
2020

- Keep Your Hands Off Eizouken!, Tsubame Mizusaki

2021

- Blue Period, Yutaka Ōba
- Taisho Otome Fairy Tale, Toshio

2022

- Deaimon, Noi
- I'm Quitting Heroing, Jerietta
- Shikimori's Not Just a Cutie, Kyo Nekozaki
- Umayuru, Tanino Gimlet

2023

- Berserk of Gluttony, Myne
- Demon Slayer: Kimetsu no Yaiba – To the Swordsmith Village, Shuya Shinazugawa
- Heavenly Delusion, Anzu
- Kuma Kuma Kuma Bear Punch!, Malix
- Rokudo's Bad Girls, Tsubaki
- The Tale of the Outcasts, young Luther Roosevelt
- The Yuzuki Family's Four Sons, Uta Kirishima

2024

- Girls Band Cry, Nana
- Goodbye, Dragon Life, Leticia
- Wonderful Pretty Cure!, Kirarin Rabbit, Torie, Uta Sakura / Cure Idol

2025

- Bad Girl, Suzu Suzukaze
- Sanda, Niko Kazao
- Harmony of Mille-Feuille, Rei "Reirei" Konoe
- You and Idol Precure, Uta Sakura / Cure Idol
- Reincarnated as the Daughter of the Legendary Hero and the Queen of Spirits, Rovel Vankrieft (at childhood of age 7)

2026

- Tamon's B-Side, Asuka Inoue
- A Hundred Scenes of Awajima, Students
- Chainsmoker Cat, Yaku Neko
- The Ghost in the Shell, Number 28

2027

- Mistress Kanan Is Devilishly Easy, Tekka Shinryūji

=== Anime film ===
- Mobile Suit Gundam: Hathaway's Flash (2021), Mihesssia Hence
- Mobile Suit Gundam: Hathaway – The Sorcery of Nymph Circe (2026), Mihesssia Hence
- Chiikawa the Movie: The Secret of the Mermaid Island (2026), Miso Picked Islander
- Girls Band Cry: The Movie (2027), Nana

=== Video games ===
2020

- Kantai Collection, South Dakota, Yashiro
- Show by Rock!! Fes A Live, Shimmak

2021

- Utawarerumono: Lost Flag, Dikotoma

2022

- Brown Dust, Rita
- Umamusume: Pretty Derby, Tanino Gimlet

2023

- Blue Archive, Kanna Ogata

2026

- Nekopara: Sekai Connect, Hozuki

=== Dubbing ===
2025

- Superman, Hawkgirl (Isabela Merced)
- Marvel Zombies, Kamala Khan/Ms. Marvel (Iman Vellani)

2026

- The End of Oak Street, Jeannette Christiansen (Jordan Alexa Davis)

=== Other ===
- Hayase Yukimi/Matsuoka Misato no "Moshikawa"
