= Yuri Komagata =

Japanese voice actress and singer

- 駒形 友梨
- Born: August 25, 1991 (age 34); Tokyo, Japan
- Occupations: Voice actress; singer
- Years active: 2012–present
- Agent: Voice Kit
- Musical career
- Genres: J-pop; anison
- Label: Imperial Records
- Website: Official website

Yuri Komagata (駒形 友梨, Komagata Yuri; born August 25, 1991) is a Filipino-Japanese voice actress and singer from Tokyo, Japan.

== Career ==
In 2017, she debuted as a singer in the Pretty Cure franchise and sang the opening of Kirakira Pretty Cure a la Mode.

== Discography ==
=== Extended plays ===
Title	Year	Album details	Peak chart positions		Sales
Title	Year	Album details	JPN	JPN Hot	Sales
(Core)	2018	Released: December 5, 2018; Label: Imperial Records; Formats: CD, digital download	41	—	—
Indigo	2019	Released: July 17, 2019; Label: Imperial Records; Formats: CD, digital download	22	—	—
"—" denotes releases that did not chart or were not released in that region.

=== Singles ===
Title	Year	Peak chart positions		Album
Title	Year	JPN		Album
"Tomare no Susume" (トマレのススメ)	2018	37	TBA	

== Filmography ==
=== Anime ===
2023

- Rokudo's Bad Girls, Erika Otohime

=== Dubbing ===
- Marona's Fantastic Tale, Solange
