= Shinobi no Ittoki =

Japanese anime television series

- Key visual
- 忍の一時
- Created by: DMM Pictures; Troyca (Note: Planning and original concept)
- Screenplay by: Minato Takano
- Directed by: Shuu Watanabe
- Music by: TOMISIRO
- Country of origin: Japan
- Original language: Japanese
- No. of episodes: 12

Production
- Executive producer: Toshiyuki Nagano
- Producers: Shuichi Takashiro; Maya Fujino; Fumiko Sato; Ayumi Ohigashi; Cao Cong; Takashi Kimoto
- Animator: Troyca
- Production companies: TMS Entertainment (production) (Note: Produced under the Unlimited Produce by TMS label.); Shinobi Ittoki Project (Note: Label consisting of various companies.)

Original release
- Network: Tokyo MX, AT-X, BS Asahi
- Release: October 4 – December 20, 2022

Shinobi no Ittoki (Japanese: 忍の一時; lit. 'Ittoki the Shinobi') is an original Japanese anime television series created by DMM Pictures and Troyca. It aired from October to December 2022.

== Plot ==
In modern-day Japan, after an attempt is made to kill him, Ittoki Sakuraba learns that he is a direct descendant of and rightful heir to the Iga Ninja clan. His mother sends him to Ninjutsu Gakuen, the only national ninja school in Japan, to study and train as a ninja while investigations are being made to discover who is trying to kill him and why. At the school, Ittoki becomes involved with his new classmates, which include some beautiful yet deadly young ninja girls, but danger is always present, especially when there is a suspected traitor inside the school.

== Cast ==
Ittoki Sakuraba (櫻羽一時, Sakuraba Ittoki)
Voiced by: Ryōta Ōsaka (Japanese); Howard Wang (English)
The main protagonist who escapes a failed assassination attempt and enrolls into the Ninja Academy. He is reluctant to become his clan's next chief but is forced to accept reality as he is thrust into the war between his clan and Koga.
Tokisada Kaga (加賀時貞, Kaga Tokisada)
Voiced by: Katsuyuki Konishi (Japanese); Ian Sinclair (English)
Ittoki's uncle and one of Iga's strongest fighters with a reputation of being called "Tokisada the Demi-God". Despite his laidback attitude, Tokisada is powerful in combat and will not hesitate to go into extremes to complete a mission.
Kōsetsu (紅雪)
Voiced by: Haruka Shiraishi (Japanese); Emily Fajardo (English)
Ittoki's childhood friend and bodyguard from the Iga village, who was adopted by Yumika. Though her origins are unknown, she wears a face mask.
Yumika Sakuraba (櫻羽弓香, Sakuraba Yumika)
Voiced by: Kikuko Inoue (Japanese); Caitlin Glass (English)
Ittoki's mother and the current chief of the Iga village who took over the leadership after the death of her husband. Though she wasn't born into a ninja family, her prudence and courage in the face of death that has earned her the respect of the entire Iga Village.
Kirei Kisegawa (黄瀬川輝麗, Kisegawa Kirei)
Voiced by: Aoi Yūki (Japanese); Katelyn Barr (English)
She's Ittoki and Kosetsu's classmate who appears to be friendly and weak, however unbeknownst to the two and to Suzaku Ban, she's deceptive and manipulative. She belongs to the Fuma Village, whose ways were conservative and radical, they frown about the changing times and prefers the old ways of the ninja. It is hinted that they wanted the Koga and the Iga to go to war among themselves.
Ryoko Suzunone (鈴ノ音涼子, Suzunone Ryōko)
Voiced by: Hitomi Sekine (Japanese); Macy Anne Johnson (English)
She belongs to the Saiga village that is already in danger of disappearing, her village was once known as the technological hub of ninjutsu, where during its heydays was the go-to place for ninjutsu tech. She and her father were the last of the said village, but despite her father's reluctance to let her continue the family tradition of being a ninja, she is still hopeful to revive the village and still invents stuff that she and her friends can use. Despite having moderate fighting skills, she excel in her studies and would often ace any test. She also excels in the use of technology in conjunction with her ninjutsu.
Satomi Tsubaki (椿里美, Tsubaki Satomi)
Voiced by: Miyu Tomita (Japanese); Emi Lo (English)
Ittoki's classmate and a ninja from the Koga village. Hiding her ninja status, she "became" Ittoki's temporarily girlfriend in an attempt to kill him. After he escapes and Satomi is arrested, she kills herself behind bars.
Suzaku Ban (伴朱雀, Ban Suzaku)
Voiced by: Taito Ban (Japanese); Nazeeh Tarsha (English)
Ittoki's rival and classmate from the Ninja Academy. He has a strong prejudiced hate against Ittoki for the Iga clan's murder of Koga's head, a man whom Suzaku had highly admired.
Himura Takane (高嶺火村, Takane Himura)
Voiced by: Taku Yashiro
Kōzō Moriyama (森山光蔵, Moriyama Kōzō)
Voiced by: Kan Tanaka (Japanese); Jim Foronda (English)
Reiha Tsuge (柘植礼羽, Tsuge Reiha)
Voiced by: Naomi Shindō (Japanese); Tiffany Solano (English)
Hoō Ban (伴鳳扇, Ban Hoō)
Voiced by: Masaki Terasoma
Enbi Takane (高嶺焔毘, Takane Enbi)
Voiced by: Yasuhiro Mamiya
Kidō Minobe (美濃部鬼道, Minobe Kidō)
Voiced by: Kenjiro Tsuda (Japanese); Eric Vale (English)
The main antagonist. Kidō is the current head of the Koga Clan following Kishinmaru's assassination, who rallies the Koga in open hostilities towards the Iga under the pretense of revenge for Kishinmaru's death, framed on Iga. Born with physical deficiencies, Kidō was unable to serve as a Ninja, being made to undergo several medical procedures that sought to augment his physical abilities, which ended in failure and leaving with him scarred for life as he would always remember the pain felt, which became more accentuated with the birth of his more successful brother Kishinmaru. Bitter and resentful for the suffering inflicted on him, Kidō developed a murderous hatred of all Ninjas and their way of life. Eventually Kidō masterminded Kishinmaru's assassination as part of an elaborate ruse to attack the Iga and take over a secret Ninja Core under their possession, said to be the original and most powerful of them all.
Shione Kōzuki (上月汐音, Kōzuki Shione)
Voiced by: Yūki Takada
Hayato Goshogawara (五所川原隼人, Goshogawara Hayato)
Voiced by: Tomoaki Maeno
Genji Karajishi (唐獅子玄二, Karajishi Genji)
Voiced by: Masaya Matsukaze
A corrupt member of the NSC. He is a secret collaborator with the Koga Clan.
Jūzen Jiraibō (児雷坊十全, Jiraibō Jūzen)
Voiced by: Mugihito
Kominami Mitsuhashi (三ツ橋小南, Mitsuhashi Kominami)
Voiced by: Nanako Mori
Gantetsu Suzunone (鈴ノ音巌鐵, Suzunone Gantetsu)
Voiced by: Atsushi Imaruoka
Kisuke Ninokuru (二ノ曲忌助, Ninokuru Kisuke)
Voiced by: Kenyu Horiuchi
Kurōdo Dazai (太宰蔵人, Dazai Kurōdo)
Voiced by: Kenji Nomura
Yachiyo Mochizuki (望月八千代, Mochizuki Yachiyo)
Voiced by: Kaori Nakamura
Amadeus Yoshinaka Nishina (仁科・アマデウス・義仲, Nishina Amadeusu Yoshinaka)
Voiced by: Hiroki Maeda
Enya (猿夜)
Voiced by: Masashi Nogawa
Iboro
Voiced by: Kazuyuki Okitsu
Mandara Samuragōchi (佐村河内曼陀羅, Samuragōchi Mandara)
Voiced by: Yuka Nukui, Yō Taichi
Benkei-Musō (弁慶無双)
Voiced by: Kōichi Sōma
Samon (左門)
Voiced by: Yō Taichi

== Production and release ==
Planned and produced by TMS Entertainment alongside DMM Pictures, and animated by Troyca, the series is directed by Shū Watanabe, with Minato Takano in charge of series' scripts, Isamu Suzuki designing the characters and serving as chief animation director, and TOMISIRO composing the music. it aired from October 4 to December 20, 2022, on Tokyo MX and AT-X. The opening theme song is "Hikari" (光; "Light"), performed by Humbreaders, while the ending theme song is "Oboetate" (おぼえたて), performed by Hockrockb. Crunchyroll streamed the series, and premiered an English dub which started on October 18, 2022.

=== Episodes ===
No.	Title	Directed by	Storyboarded by	Original release date
1	"A Bolt from the Blue"; Transliteration: "Seiten no Hekireki" (Japanese: 青天の霹靂)	Shū Watanabe	Shū Watanabe	October 4, 2022
Ittoki Sakuraba is a regular middle school student along with his childhood friend Kosetsu. His family owns a local supermarket and with his father deceased, his mother Yumika encourages him to take numerous extracurricular activities to prepare himself for the future. One day, a girl named Satomi Tsubaki approaches Ittokki and asks to go out on a date with him. Caught off guard by the sudden confession, Ittoki agrees, but is surprised when Satomi takes him straight to her house. However, once he arrives, Satomi and a team of ninjas attack him. He is rescued by Kosetsu, his uncle Tokisada, and the supermarket employees who are all also ninjas themselves. Yumika then explains that shinobi have adapted to modern times and still exist to this day. With his father's death, Ittoki is his successor to be the 19th head of the Iga Shinobi Clan, which makes him a target for the rival Koga Shinobi Clan. Meanwhile, the current head of the Koga, Kidou, declares to his clan that they will take revenge on the Iga for the death of their previous head, Kishinmaru.
2	"Merciless Choices"; Transliteration: "Jihi Naki Sentaku" (Japanese: 慈悲なき選択)	Kai Hasako	Shū Watanabe	October 11, 2022
With the Koga now aware of Ittoki's identity, Yumika lays out the choices Ittoki has. He must either become a ninja and succeed his father as head of the Iga Clan, or try return to his normal life and inevitably be killed by the Koga. However, Tokisada takes Ittoki aside and tells him Yumika is willing to grant a secret third choice, where Ittoki can go live in hiding. Unwilling to leave his mother to run the Iga Clan alone, Ittoki reluctantly decides to become a ninja. In order to keep him safe, Yumika decides to enroll Ittoki into the Kokuten Ninja Academy, which is controlled by the National Ninjutsu Security Measures Committee (NSC), making the academy neutral territory the Koga cannot openly attack. Kosetsu and Tokisada accompany Ittoki to the entrance exam, located at a Koga controlled supermarket. Satomi also infiltrates the exam but Ittoki is able to outsmart her. NSC ninjas arrests Satomi and her accomplices due to breaking the law, and Ittoki manages to pass the exam. The NSC confronts the Koga, but Kidou claims Satomi and her men went rogue, and Satomi is later found dead in her cell. Meanwhile, Tokisada talks with Yumika and voices his suspicion the Koga have already infiltrated Kokuten, the NSC, and even the Iga Clan itself.
3	"Quirks of Fate"; Transliteration: "Aienkien" (Japanese: 合縁奇縁)	Jun Takahashi	Jun Takahashi	October 18, 2022
Ittoki and Kousetsu move to the Kokuten Ninja Academy to begin their ninja education. However, they quickly find out that the Koga have a great deal of influence in the school, with the majority of the students being from the Koga Clan. Despite this, Ittoki is able to befriend two female students, Ryoko and Kirei. Kirei advises Ittoki not to antagonize the elite Koga students, who will look for any opportunity to bully him. In his first ninja class, Ittoki is tasked with using a Ninja Core and Ninja Suit to scale a tower, gather a manjuu, and return to the starting point with it. However, they have a time limit before the principal eats all the manjuu. Unfortunately, Ittoki has little experience using a Ninja Suit, and has difficulty moving until Ryoko, being from a family that manufactures ninja gear, helps adjust the suit to his size. As he heads for the tower, he discovers that the Koga students have stolen Kirei's manjuu. Angered, he confronts the Koga bullies and is beaten by them until the principal intervenes, but Ittoki was able to steal one of their manju and gives it to Kirei. However, Ittoki himself takes too long to complete his assignment as the principal eats the last manjuu. After the assignment, Ittoki finds that due to pressure from the Koga students, none of the other students want to associate with him, but he takes solace in the fact that he can count on Kousetsu, Ryoko, and Kirei to support him. Meanwhile, Tokisada receives a mission to infiltrate the Koga Clan.
4	"Crafters and Users"; Transliteration: "Tsukurite to Tsukaite" (Japanese: 作り手と使い手)	Yoshitsugu Kimura	Hidetoshi Yoshida	October 25, 2022
The NSC continues to investigate Kishinmaru's death, with the lead suspect being Tokisada. The rookie investigator Shione Kouzuki is assigned to trail him. Meanwhile, Ittoki's class is assigned a ninja tools test, where the objective is to steal the test answers without the teachers knowing. Ryoko gives Ittoki some training, and reveals her father wants her to live a normal life instead of succeeding him. Ittoki and his friends come up with a plan to steal the answers, but Ittoki's inexperience with using ninja tools tips off the teacher to their presence, forcing Kirei to act as a distraction while Ryoko picks the lock to the safe. Elsewhere, Tokisada meets with Ryoko's father Gantetsu, who mentions that the Koga approached him with working on a secret project. Tokisada then sneaks into Koga factory looking for the plans to the project but fails to find them. However, he uses Shione as a distraction to escape, and forges a large order of ninja toys from the Saiga clan. The next day, Gantetsu lets slip to Tokisada that Kidou is looking for a powerful Ninja Core. He reports this back to Yumika, who realizes the Koga want to steal the Iga's secret Ninja Core to start a war. At Kokuten, Ittoki and his friends find out to their shock that the Koga bullies had secretly swapped the test answers before they stole them, though Ryoko is able to ace the test regardless. Kousetsu warns Ittoki that one of his friends must be a traitor, as there is no other way the Koga could have known about their plan. Later, the NSC complete their autopsy of Satomi's corpse and find a microchip embedded in her brain.
5	"Cycle of Pain"; Transliteration: "Itami no Rensa" (Japanese: 痛みの連鎖)	Hiroki Hayashi	Hidetoshi Yoshida	November 1, 2022
Koga student Suzaku Ban recalls a conversation with Kishinmaru, who wanted to forge peace between all of the ninja clans, promises to take revenge on Ittoki. Kidou speaks with Suzaku's father and considers designating Suzaku as his successor. Meanwhile, Ittoki's class is informed that the academy's practical examination will take place soon. In order to prevent any sabotage from the potential traitor, Ittoki decides to prepare for the exam alone, though he accepts a special disguise tool from Ryoko. Kousetsu offers to attack Suzaku during the exam, but Ittoki refuses as he doesn't want her to kill Suzaku nor risk her getting herself killed. That night, Ittoki is met by the principal, who remarks that both Kishinmaru and Ittoki's father Hidetoki wanted to create a peaceful world for ninja. Kousetsu begins training Ittoki for the exam, where he must steal a Ninja Core from another ninja to pass. However, Suzaku also has the same disguise tool, and uses it to lure Kousetsu into a trap while he pursues Ittoki. During their fight, Ittoki espouses his pacifistic ideals to Suzaku and survives until the exam ends, causing Suzaku to hesitate on his convictions. Meanwhile, Shione continues to tail Tokisada, who leads her to a secret Koga facility where Kishinmaru's body is being experimented on, tipping off the NSC about their misconduct. Back at school, Ittoki and Kousetsu recover from their injuries and it is revealed that Kirei is a traitor working for Suzaku.
6	"Shadow and Warmth"; Transliteration: "Kage to Nukumori" (Japanese: 影とぬくもり)	Shinya Sasaki	Takayuki Gotan	November 8, 2022
In flashbacks, Kirei undergoes harsh training from her father to become the next head of the Fuma Ninja Clan, and is taught to always put up an act and never trust anybody. In the present, the Iga agree to let Ryoko and Kirei stay in their village for summer break, especially since the Saiga clan are forced to work for the Koga after their factory is sabotaged. Shione reveals her findings to her superiors, but they refuse to investigate the Koga for now. However, Kirei takes the opportunity to scout out the village's defenses and relay information to Suzaku. Suzaku appeals to his father to take part in the planned Koga assault on the Iga, but his father remains reluctant. At the village, Ittoki has fun catching sweetfish with his friends, and finds out that the entire village is preparing their annual celebration to honor Hidetaki's memory. Tokisada reveals to Ittoki that Kousetsu was an orphan who was taken in by Yumika, and it was Yumika who kept the clan together after Hidetaki's death. Kirei meanwhile is treated warmly by the Iga, who tell her how Ittoki considers her a true friend he can trust, sowing doubt in her mission. She then sends a cryptic message back to Suzaku that there is "Another peaceful day in Iga." Elsewhere, NSC investigator Goshogawara speaks with the principal, saying that he will convene a Grand Ninja Council.
7	"Where Does Justice Lie?"; Transliteration: "Seigi wa Doko ni Aru" (Japanese: 正義はどこにある)	Ken Sanuma	Jun Takahashi	November 15, 2022
Yumika tells Ittoki about the existence of Iga's secret Ninja Core, and informs him that he will only be told its location if he becomes a register ninja of the Iga Clan. The NSC covertly sends word to the 13 major Ninja clans to convene for the Grand Ninja Council, the first one in over 70 years. Ittoki stays behind in the village while Yumika goes to attend the meeting. Goshogawara levels his accusations against the Koga that they have been violating the Ninja Ordinances by unlawfully suppressing or absorbing smaller ninja clans, citing the mysterious disappearance of the Saiga and many other clans. He then calls for the other ninja heads to testify against the Koga, but none stand up except for Yumika, who admits the existence of Iga's secret Ninja Core and points out Koga is looking for a pretext to steal it. She declares that she is willing to destroy the core to keep it out of the wrong hands, and reminds the other clans that their purpose is to uphold Japan's peace, not fight each other. This inspires the other clans to admit that the Koga have been slowly encroaching on them as well. Kidou is arrested, but Captain Karajishi uncovers newly discovered evidence implicating the Iga in Kishinmaru's death, resulting in Yumika's arrest as well. Suspicious, Goshogawara performs his own investigation and discovers something wrong with the evidence, but he is murdered by Karajishi, who reveals himself to be working for Koga. At the Iga village, Ittoki decides to assume the role as the clan's acting chief. Meanwhile, blaming Iga for Kidou's arrest, the Koga declare war and prepare to attack the Iga. At the NSC headquarters, Karajishi sentences Yumika to death.
8	"Dusk Brings a Storm"; Transliteration: "Tasogare wa Arashi o Tomonatte" (Japanese: 黄昏は嵐を伴って)	Jun Takahashi & Nao Umakawa	Hidetoshi Yoshida	November 22, 2022
Kidou recalls how he was born sickly and passed over for inheritance of the Koga in favor of Kishinmaru, causing him to resent all ninja. With Goshogawara having gone missing, Karajishi takes control of the NSC, releases Kidou, and schedules Yumika's execution for the next day. Knowing that Karajishi is corrupt, Shione and her team try to figure out how to solve the situation their own way. The news reaches the Iga, and Ittoki decides to send Kousetsu and Tokisada to rescue Yumika while the rest of the clan works to prove their innocence. With Kidou free, he makes preparations for an assault on the Iga village, using robotic Asura ninjas in addition to his own forces. Suzaku volunteers to join the assault units but his father Housen objects, pointing out such an attack will ruin the Koga in the long run. Kidou executes Housen and his supporters for their defiance and orders the attack. Realizing the Koga intend to attack, the Iga clan hurriedly prepares their defenses, but the Koga are able to breach the village the itself. Kousetsu and Tokisada rescue Yumika, but they are ambushed by Karajishi during their escape. Meanwhile, Suzaku hears word of his father being murdered just as he is about to attack the Iga village.
9	"In the Light of Dawn"; Transliteration: "Akatsuki ga Terasu Mono" (Japanese: 暁が照らすもの)	Tomoki Nakano	Chizuko Kusakabe	November 29, 2022
The Koga begin their assault on the Iga village itself, but are continually repelled despite their superior numbers. From observing the Asura ninjas' behavior, Ryoko surmises that they only have a very short battery life and must be constantly recharged. Ittoki and Ryoko decide to head out to scout for recharging station while Kirei stays behind and reluctantly sends a warning to Suzaku. Meanwhile, at NSC headquarters, Tokisada is able to defeat Karajishi and his men while Kousetsu escorts Yumika back to the village. Shione and her team then arrive and arrest Karajishi, having caught a team of Koga ninja attempting to dispose of Goshgawara's body under his orders. Back at the village, Ittoki and Ryoko attempt to sabotage the charging station but are stopped by Himura, only for Kirei to intervene and destroy the charging station herself, having finally decided side with Ittoki. With the charging station destroyed, the Koga have no choice but to retreat. However, Karajishi activates a secret system implanted inside Kousetsu to mind control her and take Yumika hostage in an attempt to find the secret Iga Ninja Core. Yumika attempts to talk down Kousetsu, but is apparently stabbed and killed by her. Ittoki and his friends arrive too late and find Yumika dead while a catatonic Kousetsu is apprehended.
10	"Those Taken, Those Taken From"; Transliteration: "Ubawareta Mono-tachi" (Japanese: 奪われた者たち)	Kanji Miyake	Hidetoshi Yoshida	December 6, 2022
While Iga managed to survive Koga's assault, many other ninja clans are attacked and destroyed. With Yumika's death, the Iga clan is left in turmoil as Ittoki officially succeeds her as the 19th head of the clan. With many Iga members clamoring to retaliate, Ittoki decides to wait until Yumika's funeral is complete. Ryoko and Kirei return to their villages, only for Ryoko to find her father having had his hand cut off by the Koga and Kirei barely escaping a Koga assassination attempt thanks to her father sacrificing himself. Shione passes information to Tokisada revealing the NSC is planning to make their move against Koga and that Kousetsu had a mind control chip implanted into her as a sleeper agent. Tokisada reveals he knew Kousetsu is actually one of Kidou's illegitimate children, but Yumika decided to adopt her anyways. He also tells Ittoki that Kousetsu resisted the mind control so she could not have killed Yumika, meaning there is still a traitor in Iga. Meanwhile, Suzaku attends Yumika's funeral and pays his respects while arguing Ittoki over the need for vengeance. Suzaku then returns to his home where he finds a recording left behind by his father, proving that Kidou murdered Kishinmaru as part of a plot to eliminate all ninjas in Japan. Ittoki then tells Yumika that he has decided he will lead the Iga in his own way, and asks Tokisada for his help.
11	"The Path with No Regrets"; Transliteration: "Kuinaki Michi o" (Japanese: 悔いなき道を)	Kai Hasako	Ei Aoki	December 13, 2022
Ittoki makes the decision to negotiate with the Koga, offering to hand over the Iga Ninja Core in return for guarantees of Iga's autonomy as well as the condition of not to use the Core for military purposes. Realizing that the peace treaty would prevent them from using the Core in the Asuras, Kidou authorizes a second attack on Iga to take it by force. Meanwhile, Kirei admits she was working for Suzaku to both Ryoko and Tokisada, but they forgive her since she ultimately ended up helping defend Iga. Suzaku offers to trade his father's video to Kidou, but he sends assassins after him, instead. He easily defeats the assassins and hands over the video to Tokisada, instructing him not to get in his way. Dissatisfied with Ittoki's refusal to fight, Kozo convinces the other Iga ninjas to revolt against Ittoki, but it's all a ploy by both him and Ittoki to draw the true traitor, Reiha, into the open. Reiha claims she followed Kidou's orders for a chance to save her comatose husband before attempting to poison herself. Ittoki leaves behind a note explaining that he has taken the Core and left with Tokisada and Kousetsu to confront Kidou directly after expelling themselves from the Iga clan.
12	"Ittoki the Ninja"; Transliteration: "Shinobi no Ittoki" (Japanese: 忍の一時)	Shū Watanabe & Nao Umakawa	Shū Watanabe	December 20, 2022
Kousetsu and Tokisada refuse to let Ittoki confront Kidou on his own and accompany him despite his protests. Upon entering the Koga tower, they are immediately attacked by a horde of Asuras. Ryoko and Kirei arrive to hold them off, with Kirei apologizing to Ittoki for her betrayal. The trio continue their way up the tower, with Tokisada and Suzaku staying behind to occupy more Koga ninja, though Suzaku is badly wounded in the process. Ittoki and Kousetsu confront Kidou in his office, where Ittoki wonders if Kidou was motivated by wanting to break free from the shackles of ninja society. However, Kidou admits he only wants to destroy all ninja on his own whim and for the sake of power. Unbeknownst to him, Ittoki has been secretly transmitting Kidou's confession to the NSC, who mobilize and storm the building. Kidou activates his own Ninja Core and attacks Ittoki and Kousetsu, though thanks to the Iga Ninja Core, Ittoki is able to defeat Kidou and leaves him to be apprehended by the NSC. Kidou attempts to use the opportunity to attack Ittoki, but Tokisada intervenes and kills Kidou right as Shione and the NSC arrive. Tokisada claims full responsibility for murdering Kidou before fleeing, and Shione has no choice but to declare him a fugitive. With Kidou dead and the Koga suppressed, the situation is put under control. Several years later, peace has returned to the ninja clans. Shione continues the manhunt for Tokisada, though Kozo believes he is merely protecting Iga from the shadows. Suzaku becomes the new head of the Koga clan and makes peace with Iga. Ryoko continues developing ninja gear while Kirei decides to become an actress. Finally, Ittoki and Kousetsu decide to move on and live normal lives, though Ittoki uses his ninja abilities to save a young boy from an oncoming train and playfully claims that ninja don't exist.

== Reception ==
The anime series' first episode garnered generally mixed reviews from Anime News Network's staff during the Fall 2022 season previews. Richard Eisenbeis was critical of the "bog-standard" premiere with its "paint-by-numbers" setup but praised its "spectacular" animation for having "fluid and well-choreographed" action. James Beckett was commendable towards the "incidental details" the production makes with tiny character animations and the pacing for showing Ittoki's normal life before the "ninja action" disrupts it, but felt the series overall will be "less than the sum of its parts", saying it will "devolve into completely forgettable pablum." Caitlin Moore criticized the episode's "tedious pace" of going through "boring details and half-hearted foreshadowing" in its exposition and premise, and found Ittoki to be an "unengaging protagonist" with his "charisma-free everyman nature". Rebecca Silverman was impressed by Ittoki's gymnastic skills but felt irritated by his overly talkative nature and less than smart mindset with the various ninja situations he encounters, concluding that: "All of this very well may come together to form a good fish-out-of-water action comedy, but I can't really say that the episode has left me all that intrigued." Nicholas Dupree was also put off by Ittoki's "insufferable" yelling and lack of personality, and despite praising the solid production and ninja action, he felt the overall execution came across as "bland and dull", critiquing that: "In a much weaker season, this might be worth sticking it out for a cool fight or two, but there's way better uses of your time right now." Fellow ANN editor Grant Jones reviewed the complete anime series, saying: "It is a simply okay series with a few moments of note, but is rather forgettable. There was potential here and it's not entirely wasted, but I can't say I will think about it after the season wraps."
