= Full Clearing Another World Under a Goddess with Zero Believers =

Japanese light novel series

- First light novel volume cover

信者ゼロの女神サマと始める異世界攻略 (Shinja Zero no Megami-sama to Hajimeru Isekai Kōryaku)
- Genre: Fantasy, isekai
- Novel series
- Written by: Isle Ōsaki
- Published by: Shōsetsuka ni Narō
- Original run: May 9, 2018 – present
- Light novel
- Written by: Isle Ōsaki
- Illustrated by: Tam-U
- Published by: Overlap
- English publisher: NA: J-Novel Club
- Imprint: Overlap Bunko
- Original run: March 25, 2019 – September 20, 2026
- Volumes: 14
- Manga
- Written by: Isle Ōsaki
- Illustrated by: Hakuto Shitori
- Published by: Overlap
- English publisher: NA: J-Novel Club
- Imprint: Gardo Comics
- Magazine: Comic Gardo
- Original run: April 24, 2020 – present
- Volumes: 11
- Anime television series
- Directed by: Toshinori Fukushima
- Written by: Touko Machida
- Music by: AstroNotes
- Studio: Hornets
- Licensed by: Crunchyroll: SEA: Plus Media Networks Asia
- Original network: BS Asahi, Tokyo MX, AT-X
- Original run: October 11, 2026 – present
- Episodes: 6
- icon

Full Clearing Another World Under a Goddess with Zero Believers (Japanese: 信者ゼロの女神サマと始める異世界攻略, Hepburn: Shinja Zero no Megami-sama to Hajimeru Isekai Kōryaku; lit. 'The Isekai Walkthrough That Begins With the Goddess Who has Zero Followers') is a Japanese light novel series written by Isle Ōsaki and illustrated by Tam-U. The series was originally posted as a web novel on the Shōsetsuka ni Narō website in May 2018. Overlap later published the series in print under their Overlap Bunko imprint in 14 volumes from March 2019 to September 2026. A manga adaptation illustrated by Hakuto Shitori began serialization on Overlap's Comic Gardo website in April 2020 and has been compiled into eleven tankōbon volumes as of October 2026. An anime television series adaptation produced by Hornets premiered in October 2026.

== Plot ==
Makoto Takatsuki and his class are on their way back from a ski trip when their bus is hit by an avalanche. He and the others find themselves transported to another world, where a goddess grants them magical powers. However, while the others gain useful skills, Makoto's powers are more mundane. Makoto finds this unfair, especially when his classmates join guilds and leave him behind. When he finally sets off on his journey, he is soon found by a goddess, who asks him to be her follower as she currently has none. Despite his initial hesitation, he agrees in exchange for her helping him with his adventures. With Makoto now associated with a goddess, albeit a minor one, he aims to set off to fight the Demon Lord, while avoiding the fate of his overconfident classmates who were either killed or are missing.

== Characters ==
Makoto Takatsuki (高月 マコト, Takatsuki Makoto)
Voiced by: Sōhei Horikane (Japanese); Corey Wilder (English)
A high-school student who finds himself in another world together with his classmates. Unlike the others, he is granted powers that are relatively useless.
Noah Titan (ノア・ティターン, Noa Titān)
Voiced by: Ikumi Hasegawa (Japanese); Lacey Deline (English)
Lucy (ルーシー, Rūshī)
Voiced by: Yukina Shuto (Japanese); Darien McArthur (English)
Aya Sasaki (佐々木 アヤ, Sasaki Aya)
Voiced by: Hitomi Sekine (Japanese); Monica Rial (English)
Michio Fujiwara (藤原 ミチオ, Fujiwara Michio)
Voiced by: Masaaki Mizunaka (Japanese); Aiden Call (English)
Nina (ニナ)
Voiced by: Lynn (Japanese); Amber May (English)
Ryōsuke Sakurai (桜井 リョウスケ, Sakurai Ryōsuke)
Voiced by: Kensho Ono (Japanese); Eduardo Vildasol (English)
Sofia/Sophia Eir Roses (ソフィア)
Voiced by: Sayumi Suzushiro (Japanese); Bryn Apprill (English)
Marie (マリー, Marī)
Voiced by: Rumi Okubo (Japanese); Brianna Roberts (English)

== Media ==
=== Light novel ===
Written by Isle Ōsaki, Full Clearing Another World Under a Goddess with Zero Believers began serialization on the user-generated novel publishing website Shōsetsuka ni Narō on May 9, 2018. It was later acquired by Overlap who published fourteen volumes with illustrations by Tam-U under their Overlap Bunko light novel imprint from March 25, 2019 to September 20, 2026. The light novels are licensed in English by J-Novel Club.

No.	Title	Original release date	North American release date
1	The Weakest Mage in Class; Kurasu Meito Saijaku no Mahō Tsukai (クラスメイト最弱の魔法使い)	March 25, 2019; 978-4-86554-462-6	December 3, 2021; 978-1-71-838498-9
2	The Girl Who Reincarnated as a Calamity; Saigai Shitei no Tensei Shōjo (災害指定の転生少女)	July 25, 2019; 978-4-86554-522-7	February 18, 2022; 978-1-71-838500-9
3	Coldhearted Princess Carved of Ice; Reiketsu Naru Kōri no Chōkoku Hime (冷血なる氷の彫刻姫)	November 25, 2019; 978-4-86554-572-2	May 6, 2022; 978-1-71-838502-3
4	Death-Shrouded Priestess of a Ruined Land; Shi o Matō Bōkoku no Miko (死を纏う亡国の巫女)	April 25, 2020; 978-4-86554-643-9	August 8, 2022; 978-1-71-838504-7
5	Dragon Menace of Macallan; Ryū ni Nomareshi Mizu no Machi (竜に呑まれし水の街)	August 25, 2020; 978-4-86554-722-1	November 4, 2022; 978-1-71-838506-1
6	The Crimson Witch and the Undead King; Guren no Majo to Fushi no Maō (紅蓮の魔女と不死の魔王)	December 25, 2020; 978-4-86554-804-4	January 25, 2023; 978-1-71-838508-5
7	The Hero of Incandescence and the Lamia Queen; Shakunetsu no Yūsha to Ramia no Joō (灼熱の勇者とラミアの女王)	May 25, 2021; 978-4-86554-908-9	April 17, 2023; 978-1-71-838510-8
8	The Hero of Light and the Demon War; Hikari no Yūsha to Hito ma Sensō (光の勇者と人魔戦争)	October 25, 2021; 978-4-8240-0023-1	July 3, 2023; 978-1-71-838512-2
9	The Hero of the Sun and the Elemental Lord of Water; Taiyō no Yūsha to Mizu no Seireiō (太陽の勇者と水の精霊王)	April 25, 2022; 978-4-8240-0161-0	September 25, 2023; 978-1-71-838514-6
10	The Hero of Salvation and the Age of Demons Act 1 Kyūsei no Eiyū to Ma no Shihai (Ue) (救世の英雄と魔の支配〈上〉)	October 25, 2022; 978-4-8240-0313-3	December 11, 2023; 978-1-71-838516-0
11	The Hero of Salvation and the Age of Demons Act 2 Kyūsei no Eiyū to Ma no Shihai (Shita) (救世の英雄と魔の支配〈下〉)	May 25, 2023; 978-4-8240-0500-7	March 18, 2024; 978-1-71-838518-4
12	The Strongest Elementalist in the World and the Goddess's Wish Act 1 Sekai Saikyō no Seirei Zukai to Megami no Negai (Ue) (世界最強の精霊使いと女神の願い〈上〉)	April 25, 2024; 978-4-8240-0795-7	October 21, 2024; 978-1-71-838520-7
13	The Strongest Elementalist in the World and the Goddess's Wish Act 2 Sekai Saikyō no Seirei Zukai to Megami no Negai (Naka) (世界最強の精霊使いと女神の願い〈中〉)	April 20, 2026; 978-4-8240-1601-0	—
14	The Strongest Elementalist in the World and the Goddess's Wish Act 3 Sekai Saikyō no Seirei Zukai to Megami no Negai (Shita) (世界最強の精霊使いと女神の願い〈下〉)	September 20, 2026; 978-4-8240-1686-7	—

=== Manga ===
A manga adaptation illustrated by Hakuto Shitori began serialization on Overlap's Comic Gardo website on April 24, 2020. The manga's chapters have been collected into eleven tankōbon volumes as of October 2026. The manga adaptation is also licensed in English by J-Novel Club.

No.	Original release date	Original ISBN	North American release date	North American ISBN
1	December 25, 2020	978-4-86554-812-9	January 26, 2022	978-1-71-832770-2
2	May 25, 2021	978-4-86554-919-5	March 23, 2022	978-1-71-832771-9
3	October 25, 2021	978-4-8240-0040-8	June 29, 2022	978-1-71-832772-6
4	May 25, 2022	978-4-8240-0196-2	October 25, 2022	978-1-71-832773-3
5	November 25, 2022	978-4-8240-0347-8	July 5, 2023	978-1-71-832774-0
6	May 25, 2023	978-4-8240-0512-0	June 12, 2024	978-1-71-832775-7
7	December 25, 2023	978-4-8240-0695-0	October 16, 2024	978-1-71-832776-4
8	June 25, 2024	978-4-8240-0867-1	January 22, 2025	978-1-71-832777-1
9	March 25, 2025	978-4-8240-1133-6	September 10, 2025	978-1-71-832778-8
10	January 25, 2026	978-4-8240-1502-0	July 29, 2026	978-1-71-832779-5
11	October 8, 2026	978-4-8240-1864-9	—	—

=== Anime ===
An anime television series adaptation was announced during the "Great Overlap Bunko All-Star Gathering Special 2026" first livestream on January 11, 2026. The series will be produced by Hornets and directed by Toshinori Fukushima, with Touko Machida handling series composition, Noriko Itō desigining the characters while also serving as chief animation director alongside Minoru Tanaka, and AstroNotes composing the music. It premiered on October 11, 2026, on BS Asahi and other networks. The opening theme song is "Mirai no Ashiato" (未来の足跡; 'Footprints of the Future'), performed by 310, and the ending theme song is "Fall in Dream", performed by Suupeas. Crunchyroll is streaming the series. Plus Media Networks Asia licensed the series in Southeast Asia for broadcast on Aniplus Asia.

==== Episodes ====
No.	Title	Directed by	Written by	Storyboarded by	Original release date
1	"Makoto Takatsuki Becomes a Believer"; Transliteration: "Takatsuki Makoto, Shinja ni Naru" (Japanese: 高月マコト、信者になる)	Riki Fukushima	Tōko Machida	Riki Fukushima	October 11, 2026
Reincarnated into a fantasy world after dying in a bus crash, Makoto Takatsuki receives weak stats and basic abilities Calm Mind, Beginner Water Magic, and RPG Player, unlike his classmates who died and reincarnated alongside him who all receive powerful or useful skills. Disappointed by a ten-year lifespan limit and rejected by Princess Sophia the Water Priestess of the Goddess Eir, he leaves the Rose Country Water Temple after a year of diligent training in water magic. While exploring, RPG Player gives him a quest to rescue a merchant from monsters. With Calm Mind preventing him panicking in combat, he uses his weak water magic to drown the monsters in a river, earning a small increase to his lifespan for his heroic deed. Shortly after, a suspicious minor Goddess approaches Makoto, asking him to become her follower. When he refuses, she attempts to use Charm magic, but Makoto's Calm Mind and RPG Player renders it useless. Desperate, she reveals she has zero believers and begs for his support. Still resentful toward Sophia and Goddess Eir, Makoto agrees, gaining the title "Goddess's First Believer." Unable to grant a blessing yet, the mysterious Goddess bestows a dagger upon him and requests only a daily prayer.
2	"Makoto Takatsuki Embarks on a Quest"; Transliteration: "Takatsuki Makoto, Kuesuto ni Idomu" (Japanese: 高月マコト、クエストに挑む)	Unknown	Unknown	TBA	October 18, 2026
Makoto arrives in Macallan City, registers as a Stone-rank adventurer, and visits his reincarnated classmate Fujiwara, who gained merchant skills and now owns his own shop. When Makoto asks him to appraise the dagger, the mysterious Goddess panics, as Fujiwara appraises it is made from the god-metal Adamantite with unidentifiable spells and belonging to the Evil-Goddess Noah. He explains that "Evil-God" simply designates the old Gods that ruled Heaven before being sealed away by the new gods. He also shares a rumor a new Demon Lord will soon emerge. That night, Noah visits Makoto to grovel for him to remain her only believer. Unsatisfied with just a dagger, Makoto requests a reward fitting his gamer instincts, so Noah assigns him a quest to free her from imprisonment in the Seafloor Temple Labyrinth. Meanwhile, Makoto figures out how to solo goblins for cash, earning the guild nickname "Goblin Cleaner." His growing closeness to guild secretary Mary sparks jealousy among other adventurers, including Jean, whose former mentor, Gold rank Lucas, takes an interest in Makoto. When Makoto later rescues Jean's struggling party from an ogre, Lucas dubs him the "Ogre Slayer." Lucy, one of Jean's party members approaches Makoto in private.
3	"Makoto Takatsuki Gains a Party Member"; Transliteration: "Takatsuki Makoto, Nakama ni Kuwawaru" (Japanese: 高月マコト、仲間に加わる)	TBA	TBA	TBA	October 25, 2026
Lucy is impressed Makoto is a hero from another world and asks to join his party. Though Makoto initially refuses due to his low stats, Mary and Lucas note his creative goblin-fighting tactics have raised his Magic Mastery to level 90. Lucy reveals she possesses King Level fire magic but has low Mastery, so Makoto eventually agrees to form a party. She admits she is self-conscious about being a half-elf, but Makoto is unbothered by it. When demonstrating her fire magic, Lucy reveals her weakest spell has a three-minute long incantation and produces such a massive fireball that it accidentally sets the entire forest alight, earning a guild reprimand. Recognizing her unstable power, Makoto decides to train her Mastery. Several days later, Jean and Emily invite Makoto on a bison hunting quest. Despite Noah’s warning that the grassland lacks water for his magic, Makoto accepts so Lucy can utilize her fire spells. Noah angrily urges him to be careful. During the hunt, Lucy misses her first fireball, forcing the party to distract the bison for three minutes until she can cast again. Although they defeat the bison, a deadly griffon suddenly appears overhead.
4	"Makoto Takatsuki Synchronizes"; Transliteration: "Takatsuki Makoto ga Shinkuro Suru" (Japanese: 高月マコト、同調)	TBA	TBA	TBA	November 1, 2026
Targeting Lucy for her mana, the griffon attacks, but Makoto shields her and tells her to recast her spell. Using his Synchronization spell, which allows two mages to cast together, Makoto combines his Level 90 Mastery with Lucy's Fire King magic to cast Fire Storm, killing the griffon. Fainting, Makoto is scolded by Noah for risking his life, though Noah reveals his daily prayers have earned him the Blessing of Noah and the Elementalist ability. Feeling guilty for his burn injuriesm Lucy confesses she is half-elf and also half-fire demon. Realizing Elemental magic requires learning Elementali, the Elemental species language, Makoto is loaned an Elementali dictionary by Mary. Resuming monster hunting, Lucy gets covered in dirt. While bathing in a lake, she tries to invite Makoto to move into her room at an inn, but an interrupting ogre forces Makoto to kill it, leaving him with a full view of a naked Lucy. Her second invitation attempt is cut short when Makoto spots Fujiya. They go drinking with Fujiya and his rabbit-girl employee, Nina. Seeing Makoto’s growing circle of friends, Fujiya asks to join the party to escape his profitable yet boring Merchant life. Nina joins as well, revealing she is a retired Silver-rank, so they decide to explore a dungeon.
5	"Makoto Takatsuki Explores a Dungeon"; Transliteration: "Takatsuki Makoto wa Danjon wo Tansa Ku Suru" (Japanese: 高月マコトはダンジョンを探索する)	TBA	TBA	TBA	November 8, 2026
In the dungeon, Nina destroys Earth Golems using martial arts and Earth Magic. Makoto encounters an ancient Chimera, created over 1,000 years ago by the Demon Lord, guarding a door. Since the Chimera refuses to move, Makoto floods the room and uses a wave to sweep it directly into the path of Lucy’s inaccurate three-minute fireball. Behind the door lies the dungeon core: an intelligent Titanea sealed for millennia whose power could sustain all of Macallan City. Nina attacks but is injured. Seeing Makoto’s dagger, Titanea flies into a rage, declaring humans unworthy of God-made weapons. Noah intervenes to explain Makoto is her sole believer. Grateful for his release, Titanea rewards them: Fujiwara receives Titanea’s severed finger, Lucy’s staff is enchanted with Earth Magic, and Nina gains Titanea’s Blessing to boost her physical strength. Before vanishing, Titanea advises Makoto to speak directly with Elementals to earn their friendship and empower his Elemental magic. That night, Noah scolds Makoto in a dream for failing to ask her guidance. She reveals that reaching level 105 in Magic Mastery will allow him to see Elementals. However, she warns him to keep this secret, as Church Law punishes skills over level 99 with execution. Finally, she directs him to seek out the dungeon Labyrinthos to find something he needs.
6	"Makoto Takatsuki Meets a Dragon"; Transliteration: "Takatsuki Makoto, Ryū to no Kaikō" (Japanese: 高月誠、竜との邂逅)	TBA	TBA	TBA	November 15, 2026
Aya Sasaki, who sat beside Makoto during the fatal bus crash, reincarnates as a baby monster inside Labyrinthos. Meanwhile, Fujiya flies the group to Labyrinthos in an airship powered by Titanea's finger, warning them of unusually strong monsters appearing recently. In the city, Makoto destroys the mithril weapons of thugs trying to abduct Lucy, who scares them off by claiming they are Lucas' apprentices. They also spot classmate Sakurai, now the second Hero of Light in all history, escorting Princess Noelle and Sophia. Engaged to Noelle and rumoured to be romantically involved with Sophia, Sakurai has sworn to slay the newly revived Blight Dragon in Labyrinthos. Sakurai privately invites Makoto on the hunt, though Makoto declines, mistaking the offer for polite courtesy. Noah cryptically refuses to say if Sakurai was who she sent Makoto to Labyrinthos to find. Disappointed to find Labyrinthos full of tourist attractions and date spots, Makoto is dragged by Lucy to the Waterfall Date Spot. There, the thugs ambush them, only to be devoured by the Blight Dragon, which knocks Makoto and Lucy over the falls. At the bottom, a swarm of spider-girls attacks them before being driven off by an unseen monster. The creature emerges as a Lamia, a snake-girl, grabbing Makoto and revealing herself as the reincarnated Aya Sasaki.
7	"Makoto Takatsuki Helps With Her Revenge"; Transliteration: "Takatsuki Makoto, Kanojo no Fukushū ni te o Kasu" (Japanese: 高月誠、彼女の復讐に手を貸す)	TBA	TBA	TBA	November 22, 2026
