= Kenichi Ishikura =

Japanese director and storyboard artist

Kenichi Ishikura 石倉 賢一
- Born: Japan
- Occupations: Director, storyboard artist, production assistant
- Years active: 2000–present
- Employer(s): E&G Films (2000?)
- Known for: Hidamari Sketch x Hoshimittsu; Sakura Trick

Kenichi Ishikura (Japanese: 石倉 賢一, Hepburn: Ishikura Ken'ichi) is a Japanese director and storyboard artist best known for his works with Shaft and the anime adaptation of Sakura Trick.

== Career ==
Ishikura began his career in the industry in 2000 as a production assistant for Invincible King Tri-Zenon under E&G Films, and made his debut as an episode director with the 18th episode of Shingu: Secret of the Stellar Wars. For the next several years, he worked mainly as a freelance director. In 2007, Ishikura had his first job with Shaft as an episode director and storyboard artist for Hidamari Sketch. Ishikura was working with a subcontracting studio when they asked him to choose one of their projects to work on. Ishikura chose Hidamari Sketch as he had seen director Akiyuki Shinbo's previous works including Pani Poni Dash!, which was a type of project he was interested in working on. According to him, Ishikura often got in trouble in his previous works for including too many parodies to other works; but for Hidamari Sketch, director Shinbo and the staff gave him the okay to do such. For the next 5 years, Ishikura worked mainly with Shaft, and made his series directorial debut with Natsu no Arashi! Akinai-chū (under Shinbo's general direction). The following year, he directed the third season to the Hidamari Sketch franchise with Shinbo, but he started to work less with Shaft. Following his mainstay departure from Shaft, Ishikura dirercted Da Capo III (2013) at studio Actas, but mainly based himself out of Studio Deen, where he directed both Sakura Trick (2014) and a short Ongaku Shōjo (2015) film. He stopped series directing for the time and focused mainly on episode directing and storyboarding until 2025 with the release of I'm a Noble on the Brink of Ruin, So I Might as Well Try Mastering Magic.

== Works ==
=== Television ===
In "Director(s)" column highlights Ishikura's directorial works.

Year	Title	Director(s)	Studio	SB (Note: Storyboard artist.)	ED (Note: Episode director, equivalent to unit director.)	Other roles and notes	Ref(s)
2000	Invincible King Tri-Zenon	Takashi Watanabe	E&G Films	No	No	Assistant production manager	
2001	Shingu: Secret of the Stellar Wars	Tatsuo Satō	Madhouse	No	Yes		
2002	Cyborg 009: The Cyborg Soldier	Jun Kawagoe	Japan Vistec	No	Yes		
2002	Aquarian Age: Sign for Evolution	Yoshimitsu Ōhashi	Madhouse	No	Yes		
2002	Shrine of the Morning Mist	Yuji Moriyama	Chaos Project	No	Yes		
2003	L/R: Licensed by Royalty	Itsuro Kawasaki	TNK	No	Yes		
2003	Shadow Star	Toshiaki Iino	Planet	No	Yes		
2003	Mermaid Melody Pichi Pichi Pitch	Yoshitaka Fujimoto	Actas; SynergySP	Yes	Yes		
2004	Mermaid Melody Pichi Pichi Pitch Pure	Yoshitaka Fujimoto	Actas; SynergySP	No	Yes		
2004	Tsuki wa Higashi ni Hi wa Nishi ni	Mitsuhiro Tōgō (chief); Shōsei Jinno	Radix	No	Yes		
2004	To Heart: Remember My Memories	Keitarō Motonaga	OLM, Inc. AIC ASTA	No	Yes		
2005	Gun Sword	Gorō Taniguchi	AIC ASTA	No	Yes		
2005	Petopeto-san	Akira Nishimori	Xebec M2	No	Yes		
2005	Paradise Kiss	Osamu Kobayashi	Madhouse	No	Yes		
2006	Sugar Sugar Rune	Matsushita Yukihiro	Pierrot	No	Yes		
2006	Amaenaide yo!! Katsu!!	Keitarō Motonaga	Studio Deen	No	Yes		
2006	Tactical Roar	Yoshitaka Fujimoto	Actas	No	Yes		
2006	Love Get Chu: Miracle Seiyū Hakusho	Mitsuhiro Tōgō	Radix	Yes	Yes		
2006	Yume Tsukai	Kazuo Yamazaki	Madhouse	No	No	Assistant director	
2006	Night Head Genesis	Yoshio Takeuchi	Actas; Bee Media	No	Yes		
2006	Tokimeki Memorial Only Love	Nobuhiro Takemoto	AIC ASTA	No	Yes		
2007	Hidamari Sketch	Akiyuki Shinbo (chief); Ryouki Kamitsubo (chief)	Shaft	Yes	Yes		
2007	Kaze no Stigma	Junichi Sakata	Gonzo	No	Yes		
2007	Nagasarete Airantō	Hideki Okamoto	feel.	No	Yes		
2007	Ef: A Tale of Memories	Shin Oonuma	Shaft	Yes	Yes		
2008	Hidamari Sketch x 365	Akiyuki Shinbo	Shaft	Yes	Yes		
2008	Ef: A Tale of Melodies	Shin Oonuma	Shaft	No	Yes		
2009	Hidamari Sketch x 365 Specials	Akiyuki Shinbo	Shaft	Yes	Yes		
2009	Natsu no Arashi!	Akiyuki Shinbo; Shin Oonuma (series)	Shaft	Yes	Yes		
2009	Maria Holic	Akiyuki Shinbo; Yukihiro Miyamoto (series)	Shaft	Yes	Yes		
2009	Natsu no Arashi! Akinai-chū	Akiyuki Shinbo; Shin Oonuma (series, #1–7); Kenichi Ishikura (series, #8–13)	Shaft	Yes	Yes	Ending director	
2010	Hidamari Sketch x Hoshimittsu	Akiyuki Shinbo; Kenichi Ishikura (series)	Shaft	No	Yes		
2010	Hidamari Sketch x Hoshimittsu Specials	Akiyuki Shinbo; Kenichi Ishikura (series)	Shaft	Yes	Yes		
2011	Infinite Stratos	Yasuhito Kikuchi	Eight Bit	Yes	No		
2011	Shōwa Monogatari	Mitsuhiro Tōgō; Masahiro Murakami (series)	Wao World	No	Yes	Assistant director (four episodes)	
2011	Maria Holic Alive	Akiyuki Shinbo (chief); Tomokazu Tokoro (series)	Shaft	Yes	Yes	Assistant director Opening director	
2013	Da Capo III	Kenichi Ishikura	Actas (Note: Credited as Kazami Gakuen Kōshiki Dōga-bu (風見学園公式動画部名義).)	Yes	No	Series composition	
2014	Sakura Trick	Kenichi Ishikura	Studio Deen	Yes	No	Series composition	
2016	Bakuon!!	Junji Nishimura	TMS Entertainment; 8PAN	Yes	No		
2017	Princess Principal	Masaki Tachibana	3Hz; Actas	No	Yes		
2018	100 Sleeping Princes and the Kingdom of Dreams	Yukina Hiiro	Project No.9	Yes	No		
2018	Hozuki's Coolheadedness	Kazuhiro Yoneda	Studio Deen	Yes	No		
2020	The Seven Deadly Sins: Imperial Wrath of the Gods	Susumu Nishizawa	Studio Deen	Yes	No		
2020	Sorcerous Stabber Orphen	Takayuki Hamana	Studio Deen	Yes	No		
2020	Tamayomi	Toshinori Fukushima	Studio A-Cat	Yes	No		
2021	Redo of Healer	Takuya Asaoka	TNK	No	Yes		
2021	Sorcerous Stabber Orphen: Battle of Kimluck	Takayuki Hamana	Studio Deen	Yes	No		
2021	I've Been Killing Slimes for 300 Years and Maxed Out My Level	Nobukage Kimura	Revoroot	Yes	No		
2022	My Isekai Life	Keisuke Kojima	Revoroot	Yes	No		
2025	I'm a Noble on the Brink of Ruin, So I Might as Well Try Mastering Magic	Kenichi Ishikura	Studio Deen; Marvy Jack	Yes	No		
2027	Berserk of Gluttony season 2	Tetsuya Yanagisawa (chief); Kenichi Ishikura (series)	A.C.G.T	TBA	TBA		

=== Film ===
Year	Title	Director(s)	Studio	SB	ED	Other roles and notes	Ref(s)
2011	Mahou Sensei Negima! Anime Finale	Akiyuki Shinbo	Shaft; Studio Pastoral	Yes	No	Assistant director	
2015	Ongaku Shōjo	Kenichi Ishikura	Studio Deen				

== Notes ==
=== Works cited ===
- Kizawa, Yukito; Nakamoto, Muneo; Yanagi, Yuuichi, eds. (2008). Hidamari Sketch Album. Houbunsha. ISBN 978-4832277403.
- Kizawa, Yukito, ed. (2013). ひだまりスケッチデイズ -TVアニメ公式ガイドブック- [Hidamari Sketch Days: TV Anime Official Guidebook]. Houbunsha. ISBN 978-4832277403.
