= Soaring Sky! Pretty Cure =

Japanese anime television series

- Promotional poster

ひろがるスカイ！プリキュア (Hirogaru Sukai! Purikyua)
- Genre: Magical girl
- Created by: Izumi Todo
- Anime television series
- Directed by: Koji Ogawa
- Produced by: Takashi Tanaka; Rika Tone; Takashi Washio; Maki Takahashi
- Written by: Ryunosuke Kingetsu
- Music by: Erika Fukasawa
- Studio: Toei Animation
- Licensed by: Crunchyroll
- Original network: ANN (ABC TV, TV Asahi)
- Original run: February 5, 2023 – January 28, 2024
- Episodes: 50
- Manga
- Written by: Izumi Todo
- Illustrated by: Futago Kamikita
- Published by: Kodansha
- Magazine: Nakayoshi
- Original run: March 2023 – February 2024
- Volumes: 1
- Video game

Hirogaru Sky! PreCure Hirogaru Puzzle Collection
- Developer: D3 Publisher
- Publisher: D3 Publisher
- Genre: Puzzle game
- Platform: Nintendo Switch
- Released: August 10, 2023
- Film
- Pretty Cure All Stars F

Soaring Sky! Pretty Cure (Japanese: ひろがるスカイ！プリキュア, Hepburn: Hirogaru Sukai! Purikyua; "Hirogaru Sky! Precure") (Note: "Soaring Sky! Precure". Hirogaru is Japanese for "Expanding" or "Boundless", but also a pun of the word "Hero Girls", which describes the Pretty Cure franchise as a whole.) is a Japanese anime television series produced by Toei Animation. It is the twentieth installment in the Pretty Cure franchise and was released in commemoration of the franchise's 20th anniversary. Koji Ogawa serves as the series director, with Ryunosuke Kingetsu as head writer, Atsushi Saitō as character designer, and Hajime Watanabe as sub-character designer. It began airing on all ANN stations in Japan from February 5, 2023, to January 28, 2024, succeeding Delicious Party Pretty Cure's timeslot. It was succeeded by Wonderful Pretty Cure! on February 4, 2024. The series theme is "heroism", and its motif is the sky.

== Story ==
On the birthday of Ellee, the princess of Skyland (スカイランド, Sukai Rando), Sora Harewataru, a resident of Skyland, heads to the mainland for the celebration. Meanwhile, Empress Underg, the current leader of the Underg Empire, plots to sacrifice Ellee as revenge for her ancestor, Princess Elleelain, injuring her and killing her father, Emperor Underg, and out of fear she can oppose the Empire as Elleelain did during a war between Skyland and the Underg Empire. When one of the Empress's agents, Kabaton, attempts to kidnap Ellee, Sora intervenes and pursues him, only for her and Ellee to warp to Sorashido City (ソラシド市, Sorashido-shi) on Earth, where middle school student Mashiro Nizigaoka and her grandmother, Yoyo, rescue them. Sora must return Ellee home while fighting the Underg Empire alongside Mashiro, Tsubasa, Ageha, and Ellee, who also become Pretty Cure.

At the climax of the series, Skearhead, the right-hand man of Empress Underg, reveals himself to be the mastermind behind the war between Skyland and the Underg Empire and the one responsible for manipulating Empress Underg, having killed Emperor Underg and framed Elleelain by implanting false memories in her mind.

== Characters ==
=== Pretty Cures ===
Sora Harewataru (ソラ・ハレワタール, Sora Harewatāru) / Cure Sky (キュアスカイ, Kyua Sukai) / Dark Sky (ダークスカイ, Dāku Sukai)
Voiced by: Akira Sekine
The main protagonist of the series, Sora is a hardworking 14-year-old girl from Skyland. She trains to become like her role model Captain Shalala, who rescued her when she was young. Her catchphrase is "It's hero time!" (ヒーローの出番です!, Hīrō no jikanda). While saving Ellee from the Underg Empire general Kabaton, Sora accidentally lands in Sorashido City. She has since moved into Mashiro's house as a guest. With the Sky Tone's power, she can transform into Cure Sky, the Pretty Cure of the blue sky. Her theme color is blue.

Mashiro Nijigaoka (虹ヶ丘ましろ, Nijigaoka Mashiro) / Cure Prism (キュアプリズム, Kyua Purizumu)
Voiced by: Ai Kakuma
A kind and thoughtful 14-year-old girl from Sorashido City. She is partly Skylandian through her grandmother, whom she lives with, as both of her parents work overseas. She has some knowledge about cooking and nature. Her nickname is "Mashiron" (ましろん). With the Sky Tone's power, she can transform into Cure Prism, the Pretty Cure of soft light. Her theme color is white and her secondary colour is pink.

Tsubasa Yuunagi (夕凪ツバサ, Yūnagi Tsubasa) / Cure Wing (キュアウィング, Kyua Uingu)
Voiced by: Ayumu Murase
A Puni Bird from Skyland. When a storm opens the dimensional borders between worlds, he falls into the human world and is taken in by Yoyo. Due to his inability to fly, many of his peers belittle him. He is able to take the form of a 12-year-old human boy. Following the final battle, he, Sora, and Ellee return to Skyland, but are able to return to Earth and visit. With the Sky Tone's power, he can transform into Cure Wing, the Pretty Cure of wings. His theme color is orange and his secondary colour is yellow. He is the first and only male Pretty Cure in the franchise to be part of the main lineup.

Ageha Hijiri (聖 あげは, Hijiri Ageha) / Cure Butterfly (キュアバタフライ, Kyua Batafurai)
Voiced by: Ayaka Nanase
A cheerful and fashionable 18-year-old woman and Mashiro's childhood friend who works as a kindergarten teacher. She is aspiring, kindhearted, and sisterly, having a soft spot for younger children. Her catchphrase is "Let's get excited!" (アゲてくよ!, Moriagarimashou). She is one of the few people who knew of Sora and Mashiro's identities as Pretty Cures. With the Sky Tone's power, she can transform into Cure Butterfly, the Pretty Cure of butterflies. Her theme color is pink. She is the first young adult Cure in the franchise to be part of the main lineup.

Princess Ellee (プリンセス・エル, Purinsesu Eru) / Cure Majesty (キュアマジェスティ, Kyua Majesuti)
Voiced by: Aoi Koga
The adopted princess of Skyland. She is a mysterious baby who is called "Child of Destiny" who appeared from the Morning Star and was entrusted to the care of Skyland's King and Queen. Her catchphrase is "Eru~!" (えるぅ～！). She comes to Sorashido City with Sora after Kabaton, one of the Underg Empire's generals, attempts to kidnap her. She can create Sky Tones for the Pretty Cures through her power. After Skearhead captures her and a desperate fight ensues between the Cures and the Empire, she awakens her true powers and becomes a Pretty Cure, allowing her to escape and save the Cures from his attack. It is later revealed that she was born from Elleelain's power as a countermeasure against the Underg Empire's attack. After Elleelain gives her the last of her power, she permanently ages up into a teenager, but reverts into a baby when hungry. She also gains the ability to use Noble's attack Magic Hour's End (マジックアワーズエンド, Majikku Awāzu Endo) as well as summon a barrier called Mystical Veil (ミスティックアル, Misutikkuaru Bēru). Following the final battle, she, Sora, and Tsubasa return to Skyland, but are able to return to Earth and visit. With the Sky Tone's power, she can transform into Cure Majesty, the mystical Pretty Cure. Her theme color is purple.

=== Skyland ===
Skyland (スカイランド, Sukai Rando) is a land in the sky where Sora and Tsubasa come from, which the King and Queen rule over. According to Yoyo, several years ago they and the Underg Empire were at war, and they have not been in contact since then.

Skyland King (スカイランド国王, Sukai Rando Kokuō) & Skyland Queen (スカイランド王妃, Sukai Rando Ōhi)
Voiced by: Kazuya Ichijō (King) & Konami Yoshida (Queen)
Ellee's adopted parents and the rulers of Skyland. During Battamonder's attack on Skyland, they were cursed and put in a comatose state, but are later cured through the potion the Cures made from the Kira Kira Energy of purified Ranborgs. It is also revealed they adopted Ellee after she appeared from the sky and Elleelain, as the Morning Star, told them to take care of her, as she is the "Child of Destiny" who will save Skyland. However, they entrust her to the Cures for her safety, as they are the only ones who can protect her from the Underg Empire's attacks.

Princess Elleelain (プリンセス・エルレイン, Purinsesu Erurein) / Cure Noble (キュアノーブル, Kyua Nōburu) / Morning Star (一番星, Ichibanhoshi)
Voiced by: Umeka Shōji
The former ruler of Skyland, who ruled it long ago and resembles Ellee. 300 years prior to the events of the series, she fought against the Underg Empire as Cure Noble, which resulted in the defeat of Emperor Underg and Empress Underg being injured. She disappeared following the conflict and later used her power to create the Majestic Chroniclon before becoming the Morning Star and watching over Skyland. She later appeared before Skyland's King and Queen and entrusted Ellee to them as the "Child of Destiny" who will save Skyland. Before the final battle, she passes on the last of her power to Ellee and entrusts the future to the Cures before disappearing.

Captain Shalala (シャララ隊長, Sharara Taichō)
Voiced by: Mitsuki Saiga
The captain of the Azure Guard (青の護衛, Ao no Goei) and Sora's role model. She falls in battle while helping the Cures fight a giant Ranborg, but it is later revealed that Battamonder found her body and healed her with Underg Energy. This turned her into a Ranborg, and as she is kept alive by Underg Energy, purifying the Ranborg would likely kill her. However, the Cures are able to purify the Ranborg and save her as well.

Ariri (アリリ)
Voiced by: Takayuki Sakazume
The vice captain of the Azure Guard.

Beryberie (ベリィベリー, Berīberī)
Voiced by: Satsumi Matsuda
A member of the Azure Guard.

Dragon Tribe (竜族, Ryūzoku)
Voiced by: Hiroki Yasumoto & Ryo Sugisaki
A clan of dragons who live on a floating island where the Bright Jewel shines. They are responsible for maintaining the Bright Jewel as their ancestors did, but refuse to interact with the people of Skyland because they feared their ancestors. After interacting with Tsubasa, they regain their ability to fly and, after talking with the King and Queen, begin interacting with Skyland again.

Tasan (ターサン, Tāsan)
Voiced by: Akimitsu Takase
A bird with red and white plumage who delivers gifts to Skyland's children on the day of Strichmas (スリクマス, Surikumasu), which corresponds to Christmas on Earth. His existence is a secret and he lives on an island with his wife, who helps him build toys and gifts throughout the year. The Cures help him when he is sucked into a tornado and his gifts are ruined. His name is an anagram of "Santa Claus".

=== Underg Empire ===
The Underg Empire (アンダーグ帝国, Andāgu Teikoku) is the series' main antagonists, whose generals answer to Empress Underg. According to Yoyo, several years ago they and Skyland were at war, and they have not been in contact since. This is later revealed to be because Elleelain and Empress Underg helped to establish peace between the Empire and Skyland, which is broken after the Empire's attempt to kidnap Ellee for the sacrifice. Their goal initially is to kidnap Ellee and sacrifice her, as Empress Underg believes she is Elleelain from 300 years ago. However, after learning about Ellee's true power as Cure Majesty, they now aim to destroy her at all costs before she destroys them.

==== Leader ====
Empress Underg (カイゼリン・アンダーグ, Kaizerin Andāgu)
Voiced by: Takako Honda, Maaya Uchida (young)
The mysterious current leader of the Underg Empire and the secondary antagonist of the series. She rarely speaks to her subordinates, only choosing to do so if they have had multiple failures. It is later revealed that she is the daughter of the late Emperor Underg, who Skearhead killed prior to the events of the series. To get revenge for the events of 300 years ago, she goes out to confront the Pretty Cures; while they are able to purify her, Skearhead impales her after she is saved. However, Mashiro is able to heal her injuries.

Emperor Underg (カイザー・アンダーグ, Kaizā Andāgu)
Voiced by: Taketora
The former leader of the Underg Empire and Empress Underg's late father. 300 years ago, prior to the events of the series, he attacked Skyland, but Cure Noble thwarted his plans and seemingly killed him. In reality, Empress Underg was hurt after shielding him from Noble's attack. Empress Underg believes that Cure Noble later betrayed and killed him because Skearhead implanted false memories in her mind.

Skearhead (スキアヘッド, Sukiaheddo)
Voiced by: Mitsuru Miyamoto
The right-hand man of Empress Underg and the main antagonist of the series. He is a cold and threatening man who is hard to read. He ultimately commits suicide in an attempt to kill Sky and Majesty, but fails and fades away into Underg Energy while lamenting he failed Empress Underg. He is later revealed to still be alive and betrays Empress Underg by impaling her after she is purified. He is also revealed to have killed Emperor Underg and framed Elleelain by implanting false memories in Empress Underg's mind. He later turns into Darkhead (ダークヘッド, Dākuheddo), the incarnation of Undergu Energy. During the battle, he possesses Sora to attack the Cures, but Mashiro is able to expel him from her body. His true form is Daijarg (ダイジャーグ, Daijāgu), a giant monstrous snake made of pure Underg Energy. The Cures are able to defeat him, causing him to lament the fact that he manipulated numerous victims into turning against each other all his life before he dies permanently.

==== Generals ====
Kabaton (カバトン)
Voiced by: Yasuhiro Mamiya
The first Underg general to appear. He is a rowdy pig-like general who believes that strength is everything. His catchphrase is I'm Strong! (オレ、TUEEE!, Ore, TUEEE!). After several failures, he turns himself into a Ranborg, but the Cures defeat him. After Sora saves him from Empress Underg's wrath, he decides to leave the Underg Empire and begin a new life in Sorashido City. He later returns to aid the Cures during Empress Underg's attack on Skyland.

Battamonder (バッタモンダー, Battamondā)
Voiced by: KENN
The second Underg general to appear. He is a laid-back yet short-tempered egotist with locust-like antennae who prefers letting Ranborgs fight for him. After the Cures defeat him, he later starts a new life in Sorashido City working as a construction worker and calling himself Monda (もんだ). He later disguises himself as Cure Pumpkin (キュアパンプキン, Kyua Panpukin) to ruin the Cures' reputation, but is unsuccessful. He also formed a bond with Mashiro before Skearhead forces him to either consume Underg Energy to gain the power to defeat the Cures once and for all, losing his soul in the process, or die. However, the Cures are able to purify him. He later returns to aid the Cures during Empress Underg's attack on Skyland.

Minoton (ミノトン)
Voiced by: Keikō Sakai
The third Underg general to appear. He is a minotaur-like warrior who prefers to fight fairly. After several attempts to defeat the Cures, Skearhead banishes him from the Underg Empire as punishment for his failures and transforms him into a Ranborg, but the Cures purify him. However, Skearhead takes him back to the Underg Empire since he believes he is still of use. He is changed back into a Ranborg, but the Cures defeat him after obtaining the power of the Majestic Chroniclon. Afterwards, he leaves while acknowledging the Cures as worthy opponents. He later returns to aid the Cures during Empress Underg's attack on Skyland.

==== Monsters ====
Ranborg (ランボーグ, Ranbōgu)
Voiced by: Kōichi Sōma
The main monsters of the series, which the generals of the Underg Empire summon. It is later revealed that humans can also be turned into Ranborgs, but because Underg Energy is deadly to them, they are not usually used as hosts. Later on, a new type of Ranborg called Kyoborg (キョーボーグ, Kyōbōgu) is introduced.

=== Cures' family members ===
Remi Harewataru (レミ・ハレワタール, Remi Harewatāru)
Voiced by: Yukiko Aruga
Sora's mother, a local shop owner who owns Hoshidona Shopping Mall.

Shido Harewataru (シド・ハレワタール, Shido Harewatāru)
Voiced by: Yasumichi Kushida (Episode 15), Takanori Hoshino (Episode 23 onwards)
Sora's father. He once designed stenciled textbooks in his 20s.

Red Harewataru (レッド・ハレワタール, Reddo Harewatāru)
Voiced by: Natsumi Fujiwara
Sora's younger brother.

Yoyo Nijigaoka (虹ヶ丘 ヨヨ, Nijigaoka Yoyo)
Voiced by: Tomoko Shiota
Mashiro's grandmother. She is a Skylandian scholar who moved to Sorashido City as part of her research on the human world.

Akira Nijigaoka (虹ヶ丘 あきら, Nijigaoka Akira) & Mahiru Nijigaoka (虹ヶ丘 まひる, Nijigaoka Mahiru)
Voiced by: Daisuke Takahashi (Akira) & Yuka Keichō (Mahiru)
Mashiro's parents, who work overseas.

Kakeru (カケル)
Voiced by: Katsumi Toriumi
Tsubasa's father. Years earlier, he saved his son from a fall by miraculously gaining the ability to fly.

Puwa (プワ)
Voiced by: Satomi Satō
Tsubasa's mother.

Maria Saotome (早乙女 まりあ, Saotome Maria) & Kaguya Saotome (早乙女 かぐや, Saotome Kaguya)
Voiced by: Yui Makino (Maria) & Chiharu (Kaguya)
Ageha's older sisters, who work as models.

=== Sorashido City residents ===
Midori Miyata (宮田 緑, Miyata Midori)
Voiced by: Kyōko Yamaguchi
An elderly woman who the Cures meet in a shoe store. She is looking for a new pair of baby shoes as a gift for her granddaughter to celebrate her first steps and her family's move to England.

Ryota Miyata (宮田 亮太, Miyata Ryōta)
Voiced by: Kenta Ōkuma
Midori's son.

Takeru Osanai (長内 たける, Osanai Takeru)
Voiced by: Yuki Kodaira
A child who attends Sorashido Nursery, where Ageha teaches. He is a fan of Cure Wing and Cure Butterfly and knows the latter's identity as a Pretty Cure, but promises to keep it a secret from the other children.

Takeru's Grandmother (たけるの祖母, Takeru no Sobo)
Voiced by: Eiko Hanawa
An elderly lady and a former kindergarten teacher of Sorashido Nursey. She took care of Ageha during her parents' divorce period and inspired her to become a teacher like her.

Natsumi (菜摘)
Voiced by: Rie Suegara
An art student who works part-time with Ageha at the Pretty Holic shop.

Rena (れな), Yuuki (ゆうき, Yūki) & Ryou (りょう, Ryō)
Voiced by: Haruka Shamoto (Rena), Aya Kawakami (Yuuki) & Yukako Kiuchi (Ryou)
Children who attend Sorashido Nursery, where Ageha teaches.

Shoko Amano (天野翔子, Amano Shōko)
Voiced by: Takako Tanaka
A girl who the Cures encounter at the airport and help reunite with her father, who she had become separated from. She bonds with Tsubasa over their shared interest in airplanes, as she dreams of being a pilot like her mother.

Shoko's Parents (翔子の両親, Shōko no Ryōshin)
Voiced by: Go Shinomiya (Father) & Ai Ishikawa (Mother)
Shōko's parents. Her mother is a flight pilot for the Japanese airline Peach Aviation.

Kako (加古)
Voiced by: Shinji Kawada
Maria and Kaguya's manager, who previously had recruited Ageha as a model for some time. He is a man who gets carried away easily, and prefers to be called the friendly Kakko (カッコ)

Riho (りほ)
Voiced by: Noriko Shitaya
A little girl who is Marron's owner. Some time ago, she and her mother moved away and she forgot to bring Marron with her, resulting in it being left behind. She reunites with Marron upon returning to Sorashido City to pick it up and meeting Sora and the others, who had found Marron.

Satsuko (サツコ)
Voiced by: Ai Satō
Yoyo's friend, who took care of Mashiro and Ageha when they were little. She owns farmyard animals.

Shiro (しろ)
Satsuko's goat. When they were little, Mashiro and Ageha used to take her for walks with them.

=== Sorashido Private Academy ===
Osamu Zokibayashi (雑木林 おさむ, Zōkibayashi Osamu)
Voiced by: Hironori Kondo
The head teacher of Sorashido Private Academy (私立ソラシド学園, Shiritsu Sorashido Gakuen).

Tsumugi Nakata (仲田つむぎ, Nakata Tsumugi), Rui Yoshii (吉井るい, Yoshī Ruī) & Asahi Karuizawa (軽井沢あさひ, Karuizawa Asahi)
Voiced by: Haruka Shamoto (Tsumugi), Ai Ishikawa (Rui) & Shotaro Uzawa (Asahi)
Sora and Mashiro's classmates.

Tamaki Shinomiya (四宮 たまき, Shinomiya Tamaki)
Voiced by: Sara Matsumoto
The ace of the academy's girls' baseball team, who asks Sora to coach her team after an elbow injury prevents her from pitching in a tournament. She is later diagnosed with needing elbow surgery, but sneaks out of the hospital on the day of the tournament. When a Kyoborg attacks, she witnesses Sora's battle against it, which gives her the courage to go through with the surgery.

Kaname Ōgi (扇 かなめ, Ōgi Kaname)
Voiced by: Yuka Nishigaki
The head of the academy's girls' baseball team.

=== Others ===
Pinkton (ピンクットン, Pinkutton)
Voiced by: Megumi Urawa
A pig-like creature who inhabits the realm within the Mirror Pad and helps the Cures train when they are sucked into it.

Marron (マロン, Maron)
Voiced by: Kurumi Mamiya
A cat-like stuffed animal who once belonged to a young girl named Riho, but was left behind when she and her family moved away some time ago. After Sora seeks shelter within the family's old house, she encounters Marron and decides to help it reunite with Riho.

=== Movie Characters ===
Preme (プリム, Purimu) / Cure Supreme (キュアシュプリーム, Kyua Shupurīmu) / Supreme (シュプリーム, Shupurīmu) / Supreme Beta (シュプリームβ, Shupurīmu Beta)
Voiced by: Maaya Sakamoto
The main antagonist of Pretty Cure All Stars F. She is a mysterious girl from another world who travels with Sora and her friends, and like them can transform into a Pretty Cure. It is later revealed that she is the true instigator of the film's events; as Supreme, she was responsible for killing the Pretty Cures and destroying the Earth. She then created a new world where she is the only Pretty Cure while splitting her powers to create her current form and Puca. She disguises herself as a human to travel with Sora's group and learn more about them and what it means to be a Pretty Cure. She is ultimately defeated after Puca taps into her hidden abilities and through the power of the Miracle Lights. After her defeat, she realizes the truth behind the Cures' strength and admits to Puca that she realized she had begun to change when creating her.

Puca (プーカ, Pūka) / Cure Puca (キュアプーカ, Kyua Pūka)
Voiced by: Atsumi Tanezaki
A cowardly rabbit-like fairy who appears in Pretty Cure All Stars F, who Mashiro rescues after encountering her in the other world. Puca has the ability to destroy everything she touches; as a result, she usually avoids contact with others until she begins to open up her heart to the Cures. It is later revealed that Puca is the other half of Supreme, having been created when she used her power to create her based on the fairy mascots, but later abandoned her because she was unwilling to fight. During the final battle, Cure Sky and Cure Prism's determination inspires her to use her strength to support the Cures, creating a new Miracle Light that restores the original Earth and allows her to transform into a Pretty Cure. After Supreme is defeated, she decides to travel with her.

Arc (アーク, Āku)
The secondary antagonist of Pretty Cure All Stars F. He is a shadowy entity that conquered the other world and resides in the mysterious castle. It is later revealed that Preme created him to fight against as part of her efforts to understand what it means to be a Pretty Cure.
Lesser Arc (レッサーアーク, Ressā Āku)
Voiced by: Takehiro Shimada, Yoshiyuki Shimotsuma, Masashi Tamaki, Shohei Fuji, Hiroki Yamada & Katsugo Batori
Arc's minions, who occupy parts of the other world.

== Development ==
The series' trademark was first confirmed by Toei in November 2022, and the official website launched on the same date. On January 8, 2023, Toei revealed the main characters, three of the voice actors, and the series' setting and theme.

Takashi Tanaka of ABC Animation said the theme of "heroism" was to honor the series' twentieth anniversary, adding that "in the history of Pretty Cure, which evolves and expands in various ways, one thing has remained unchanged: the heroines who have paved difficult paths with their own hands, leading the way and encouraging others. I chose this theme with that thought in mind." He also said the following:

The main character, Sora, is a girl who yearns to be a hero. With the desire to become a hero, she pushes forward beyond the boundless blue sky. She grows up while discovering her identity as a "hero" by leaving the world where she was born and raised and meeting Mashiro and her many friends. Through her, I would like to carefully draw a Pretty Cure-like hero image. To dream, to never give up, to forgive others, to believe in friends, to be positive. Working hard, and sharing that moment...

Series creator and producer Takashi Washio also stated in an interview the following regarding the series:

The Pretty Cure series, which started with Futari wa Pretty Cure in 2004, has reached its 20th work! I would like to thank all of you for your support that has made it possible for us to continue for such a long time. Thank you very much. Thank you from the bottom of my heart. Up until now, Pretty Cure has been based on many themes and motifs, but this time, the theme is "hero" and the motif is "sky". The endless "sky", a magnificent world that is clear, blue, and full of transparency. The main character of this work is a character that embodies the "sky" that you imagine."

The voice actors for the main characters commented on their roles in the series. Akira Sekine said "I will cherish this baton that I received from all the seniors who were involved in Pretty Cure, and I will do my best to spread courage and energy to everyone together with Sora! I will!". Ai Kakuma, who voiced Rabirin in Healin' Good Pretty Cure, said "I was in charge of voicing Rabirin for Healin' Good Pretty Cure for a year, but all the time and experience I had with Pretty Cure became my treasure." Aoi Koga said on her role in the series: "Even before I became a voice actor, it was my dream and goal to appear in the Pretty Cure series, so I was incredibly happy. I couldn't calm down, thinking, 'Isn't this still a dream?' I was grateful to be able to be involved in a work I had dreamed of, and to be able to live in the world as Ellee-chan, and face each episode with care. I think so!" On February 2, the voice actors for both Cure Wing and Cure Butterfly were revealed in an official press release. Cure Butterfly was revealed as the first adult Pretty Cure, while Cure Wing was revealed as the first male Pretty Cure to be part of a main lineup. Washio stated in that press conference, when asked by a reporter, "I have said before that when the time comes, Pretty Cure does not have to be limited to women, and I think this may be the right time. This year is also our 20th anniversary year, and with everyone's cooperation, we decided to introduce a male Pretty Cure."

== Media ==
=== Anime ===
Soaring Sky! Pretty Cure premiered on February 5, 2023, and airs on all ANN stations in Japan. Ami Ishii performs the series' opening theme "Hirogaru Sky! Pretty Cure ~Hero Girls~" (Japanese: ひろがるスカイ！プリキュア ~Hero Girls~, Hepburn: Hirogaru sukai! Purikyua ~Hero Girls~) and the ending theme "Hirogarhythm" (ヒロガリズム, Hirogarizumu) along with Chihaya Yoshitake. Yoshitake performs the 2nd ending theme "Dear Shine Sky". Erika Fukasawa composes the music for the series.

Crunchyroll streamed the series with original Japanese audio and English subtitles.

=== Films ===
A theatrical film titled Pretty Cure All Stars F (映画プリキュアオールスターズ F, Eiga Purikyua Ōru sutāzu Efu; "Precure All Stars F") was released in Japanese theaters on September 15, 2023 as part of the Pretty Cure All Stars series of films to commemorate the franchise's 20th anniversary. The film is directed by Yuta Tanaka and written by Jin Tanaka. Machico and Ami Ishii perform the film's opening theme, For "F". Chisato Yoshitake, Karin Isobe, Rie Kitagawa, Yuri Komagata, Machico, and Kanako Miyamoto perform the film's insert theme, "All for one Forever". Ikimonogakari performs the film's ending theme, "Ureshikute" (うれしくて; "I'm Very Happy"). It is currently the highest grossing Pretty Cure film to date, with its opening week earning ¥591 million and grossing a total of ¥1.19 billion at the Japanese box office with a total of 978,000 tickets sold.

Wonderful Pretty Cure the Movie: A Thrilling Adventure In The Game World! (わんだふるぷりきゅあ！ざ・むーびー！ドキドキ♡ゲームの世界で大冒険, Wandafuru Purikyua! Za・Mūbī! Dokidoki ♡ Gēmu no Sekai de Daibōken!), was released in Japanese movie theaters on September 13, 2024.

You and Idol Pretty Cure the Movie: For You! Our Kirakilala Concert! (映画キミとアイドルプリキュア♪ お待たせ！キミに届けるキラッキライブ！, Eiga Kimi to Aidoru Purikyua ♪ Omatase! Kimi ni Todokeru Kirakiraibu!), was released on September 12, 2025.

=== Merchandise ===
Bandai Namco Holdings (under the Bandai branding) handles merchandising for the series, which includes toys and related goods. A spinoff of the Pretty Holic line, titled Pretty Holic Stationary, was also released upon the anime's debut.

=== Manga ===
A manga adaptation by the Futago Kamikita twins began serialization in the March 2023 issue of Kodansha's Nakayoshi magazine.

=== Music ===
==== Opening ====
Song	Artist	Episodes
"Hirogaru Sky! Pretty Cure ~Hero Girls~" (ひろがるスカイ！プリキュア ~Hero Girls~)	Ami Ishii	1 - 50

==== Endings ====
Song	Artist	Episodes
"Hirogarhythm" (ヒロガリズム)	Chihaya Yoshitake & Ami Ishii	1 - 21
Dear Shine Sky	Chihaya Yoshitake	22 - 49
URESHIKUTE	Ikimonogakari	33 - 34
All for one Forever	Chihaya Yoshitake, Karin Isobe, Rie Kitagawa, Yuri Komagata & Kanako Miyamoto	35 - 36
"Hirogarism ~Precure Quintet Ver.~" (ヒロガリズム ～Precure Quintet Ver.～)	Akira Sekine (Cure Sky), Ai Kakuma (Cure Prism), Ayumu Murase (Cure Wing), Ayaka Nanase (Cure Butterfly), Aoi Koga (Cure Majesty)	50

==== Insert Song ====
Song	Artist	Episodes
Daybreak song	Machico, Rie Kitagawa, Chihaya Yoshitake & Ami Ishii	50

== See also ==
- Super Hero Time and Nichi Asa Kids Time - The timeslot blocks by ANN in Japan, which the series is part of.

Preceded by Delicious Party Pretty Cure	Soaring Sky! PreCure; 2023-2024	Succeeded by Wonderful Pretty Cure!
