= Mayu =

Mayu may refer to:

- Mayu (given name), a feminine Japanese given name
- Mayu River, a river of Burma
- Mayu Frontier District, a former administrative zone of Burma
- Mayu Island (妈屿), Shantou, China
- Mayu, Jinzhou, Hebei (马于镇), a town in southwestern Hebei, China
- Mayu, Rui'an (马屿镇), a town in Rui'an, Zhejiang, China
- Mayu Peninsula, a mountain range in Myanmar
- Meyab, Razavi Khorasan, village in Iran, also known as Mayu
