= Mayu (given name) =

Mayu is a Japanese feminine given name. People with this name include:

== People ==
=== Actresses ===
- Mayu Asada (麻田 真夕; born 1975), Japanese pink film actress
- Mayu Hotta (堀田 真由; born 1998), Japanese actress
- Mayu Iino (飯野 茉優; born 1999), Japanese voice actress
- Mayu Matsuoka (松岡 茉優; born 1995), Japanese actress
- Mayu Tsuruta (鶴田 真由; born 1970), Japanese actress
- Mayu Watanabe (渡辺 麻友; born 1994), Japanese actress, ex-member of idol group AKB48

=== Singers ===
- Mayu Wakisaka (脇阪 真由), Japanese singer-songwriter based in the United States
- Mayu Kōma (高麗 真友), Japanese singer, dancer and member of K-pop group tripleS

=== Sportspeople ===
- Mayu Honda (本田 万結; born 2004), Japanese judoka
- Mayu Kida (木田 真有; born 1982), Japanese sprinter
- Mayu Kuroda (黒田 真由; born 1989), Japanese artistic gymnast
- Mayu Ishikawa (石川 真佑; born 2000), Japanese volleyball player
- Mayu Iwatani (岩谷 麻由; born 1993), Japanese professional wrestler
- Mayu Hamada (濱田 真由; born 1994), Japanese taekwondo practitioner
- Mayu Ikejiri (池尻 茉由; born 1996), Japanese women's footballer
- Mayu Matsumoto (松本 麻佑; born 1995), Japanese badminton player
- Mayu Mukaida (向田 真優; born 1997), Japanese sport wrestler
- Mayu Sasaki (佐々木 繭; born 1993), Japanese women's footballer

=== Visual artists ===
- Mayu Kanamori (金森 マユ; born 1963), Japanese photojournalist and photo media artist based in Australia
- Mayu Shinjo (新條 まゆ; born 1973), Japanese manga artist
- Mayu Sakai (酒井 まゆ; born 1982), Japanese manga artist

== Fictional characters ==
- Mayu Amakura, a character from the Fatal Frame series
- Mayu Hasuda, a character from the film Battle Royale II: Requiem
- Mayu Kashiwada, a character from the anime Futari wa Pretty Cure (known as Maya Kennedy in English releases)
- Mayu Nekoyashiki, a character from the anime Wonderful Pretty Cure!
- Mayu Okada, a character from the anime Smile PreCure!
- Mayu Sakuma, a character from The Idolmaster Cinderella Girls
- Mayu Shimada, a character from Wake Up, Girls!
- Mayu Suzumoto, a character from the anime Corpse Party
- Mayu Tachibana, a character from Kamen Rider 1 (film)
- Mayu Tobita, a character from Kodocha
- mayu, a character from the anime Selector Infected WIXOSS
- MAYU, a voice in the software voice synthesiser Vocaloid 3
- Mayu, a character from the anime Elfen Lied
- Mayu, a character from the anime Space Pirate Captain Harlock

== See also ==
- Mayuko
