= Wonderful Pretty Cure! =

Japanese anime television series

- Promotional poster

わんだふるぷりきゅあ！ (Wandafuru Purikyua!)
- Genre: Magical girl
- Created by: Izumi Todo
- Anime television series
- Directed by: Masanori Sato
- Produced by: Saya Koseki (ABC TV); Kanako Tada (ABC-A); Maki Takahashi (ADK EM); Rika Tone
- Written by: Yoshimi Narita
- Music by: Erika Fukasawa
- Studio: Toei Animation
- Licensed by: Crunchyroll
- Original network: ANN (ABC TV, TV Asahi)
- Original run: February 4, 2024 – January 26, 2025
- Episodes: 50
- Manga
- Written by: Izumi Todo
- Illustrated by: Futago Kamikita
- Published by: Kodansha
- Magazine: Nakayoshi
- Original run: February 2, 2024 – December 27, 2024
- Film
- Wonderful Pretty Cure! The Movie: A Grand Adventure in a Thrilling Game World!
- icon

Wonderful Pretty Cure! (Japanese: わんだふるぷりきゅあ！, Hepburn: Wandafuru Purikyua!; stylized as Wonderful Precure!) (Note: Wonderful is a pun on "Wonderful" and "Wan", the Japanese onomatopoeia for a dog's bark, tying it to the series' main motifs of pets and animals.) is a Japanese anime television series produced by Toei Animation. It is the twenty-first installment in the Pretty Cure franchise and its first entry with a title written in hiragana. It is directed by Masanori Sato and written by Yoshimi Narita, with character designs by Yoko Uchida and costume designs by NaSka. It began airing on all ANN stations in Japan from February 4, 2024, to January 26, 2025, succeeding Soaring Sky! Pretty Cure's timeslot, and was succeeded by You and Idol Pretty Cure. The series' main theme is bonds and its main motifs are pets and animals in general.

== Story ==
After the magical realm of Niko Garden is attacked, its animal inhabitants are corrupted and transformed into evil eggs. In Animal Town, where humans and animals live together, middle school student Iroha Inukai is walking her family's dog Komugi, who finds a stone-like object. When one of the eggs hatches into a mysterious monster called a Garugaru that begins rampaging, Komugi's desire to protect Iroha resonates with the Mirror Stone and causes the stone to transform into a Wonderful Pact, which grants her the power to become human and transform into a Pretty Cure. She purifies the Garugaru and returns it to its original form: a Niko Animal named Mey Mey. He tells her and Iroha what happened to Niko Garden and that they must purify the Garugaru and return them to Niko Garden. Together with Iroha, Yuki, and Mayu, Komugi works to save the Garugaru and Niko Garden.

Later in the story, the Gaou-tachi, a pack of vengeful Japanese wolf spirits, are revealed to be responsible for attacking Niko Garden and transforming its inhabitants into Garugaru, as they seek revenge against humanity for causing their extinction.

== Characters ==
=== Pretty Cures ===
Komugi Inukai (犬飼こむぎ, Inukai Komugi) / Cure Wonderful (キュアワンダフル, Kyua Wandafuru)
Voiced by: Maria Naganawa
The Inukai family's pet Papillon. Two years prior to the events of the series, she originally belonged to Kurihara and was named Marron (マロン, Maron). After he was placed in a nursing home, she escaped from the animal shelter where she was being housed to search for him and met Iroha. She is curious, athletic, gluttonous, and loves to go for walks. When a Garugaru attacks her and Iroha, Komugi's desire to protect Iroha resonates with the Mirror Stone and transforms the stone she found into a Wonderful Pact, allowing her to transform into a human and into Cure Wonderful. After gaining the ability to transform into a human, she is able to talk to Iroha and loves to imitate her catchphrase, "Wonderful!" (わんだふるー！, Wandafurū!; stylized in hiragana). Gaou later briefly transforms her into a Gaogaon, but she returns to normal through her bond with Iroha. During the final battle with Gaou, she sacrifices herself to protect Iroha, but is revived after meeting with Gaou's spirit. Following the final battle, she loses her ability to speak and transform into a human, but regains the ability to speak after the Mirror Stone reacts to the pets and owners' love for each other. She is the first mascot of the franchise to be a protagonist. Her theme color is pink.

Iroha Inukai (犬飼いろは, Inukai Iroha) / Cure Friendy (キュアフレンディ, Kyua Furendi)
Voiced by: Atsumi Tanezaki
An honest and athletic 14-year-old girl and a second-year middle school student who lives in Animal Town and is Komugi's owner, whose daily routine is taking her for morning walks. She has many friends whom she loves to help and is liked by a lot of animals. She is childhood friends with Satoru, having known him since they met when he took Daifuku to Friendly Animal Hospital & Salon, and later reciprocates his feelings after he confesses to her. Her catchphrase is "Wonderful!" (ワンダフルー！, Wandafurū!; stylized in katakana). Iroha transforms into Cure Friendy using the Wonderful Pact. Her theme color is purple.

Yuki Nekoyashiki (猫屋敷ユキ, Nekoyashiki Yuki) / Cure Nyammy (キュアニャミー, Kyua Nyamī)
Voiced by: Satsumi Matsuda
Mayu's pet cat, who has recently moved to Animal Town with her and supports her when she is shy. In the past, she was a stray cat who lived at an abandoned house in a village in the mountains. She and Mayu met when her family traveled to the village for her father's job, with Mayu deciding to adopt her after bonding with her during their stay. She later gains the ability to transform into a human and into Cure Nyammy, a mysterious Pretty Cure who appears to aid Wonderful and Friendy and to protect Mayu, as shown in the anime. She later reveals to Mayu that she gained this power when the bear Garugaru attacked her and the charm Mayu made for her transformed into the Shiny Cats Pact. Unlike them, who aim to rescue the Garugaru, she initially prefers to fight them until she comes to empathize with their pain and their similarity to her past of being alone. As well, unlike them, who use the Wonderful Pact to transform, she uses the Shiny Cats Pact. Following the final battle, she loses her ability to speak and transform into a human, but regains the ability to speak after the Mirror Stone reacts to the pets and owners' love for each other. Her theme color is blue.

Mayu Nekoyashiki (猫屋敷まゆ, Nekoyashiki Mayu) / Cure Lillian (キュアリリアン, Kyua Ririan)
Voiced by: Reina Ueda
A 14-year-old girl who has recently moved to Animal Town, where her parents own a branch of Pretty Holic. Despite wanting to make friends, she is shy and often needs her pet cat, Yuki, to motivate her at first. However, after meeting Iroha and Komugi, she begins to befriend them. When she was younger, she met Yuki at an abandoned house when her family traveled to a village in the mountains for her father's job. Although the villagers told Mayu that Yuki did not trust humans, she bonded with her during their stay and decided to adopt her so that she would not be left behind. After Yuki reveals her true identity to her, she comes into conflict with her when Yuki tries to prevent her from being friends with Komugi and Iroha. This is resolved after she declares her desire to protect Yuki, which causes the Mirror Stone to resonate with her compact, transforming it into the Shiny Cats Pact. Mayu transforms into Cure Lillian using the Shiny Cats Pact. Her theme color is green.

=== Pretty Cure Allies ===
Daifuku Toyama (兎山大福, Toyama Daifuku)
Voiced by: Yuichi Nakamura
Satoru's pet Holland Lop rabbit, who usually plays with Komugi. Three years prior to the events of the series, he was found by Satoru after being attacked by a snake and was taken to Friendly Animal Hospital & Salon, where Satoru met Iroha. In Wonderful Pretty Cure the Movie: A Thrilling Adventure In The Game World! and during the final battle with Gaou, he gains a human form and the ability to speak, as well as a Cure-like form along with Satoru. Following the final battle, he loses his ability to speak and transform into a human, but regains the ability to speak after the Mirror Stone reacts to the pets and owners' love for each other. His theme color is yellow.

Satoru Toyama (兎山悟, Toyama Satoru)
Voiced by: Takuma Terashima
Iroha's classmate, who is kindhearted and good at studying; he has a crush on her, which she is unaware of until Mey Mey accidentally reveals it to her. However, he is hesitant to confess to her, as he worries about their friendship changing, but she reciprocates his feelings when he confesses. He is researching Animal Town's history in hopes of learning more about the Mirror Stone, and, after learning that Komugi and Iroha are Pretty Cure, uses his extensive knowledge of animals to support them, and later, Yuki and Mayu. In Wonderful Pretty Cure the Movie: A Thrilling Adventure In The Game World! and during the final battle with Gaou, he gains a Cure-like form along with Daifuku. His theme color is orange.

=== Niko Garden ===
The Niko Garden (ニコガーデン, Niko Gāden) is a magical realm where Niko Animals and Kirarin Animals live in peace. Prior to the events of the series, its ruler, Niko, created the realm and brought animals from Earth to live there happily. After Gaou attacked and damaged the Niko Diamond, he used its power to transform its inhabitants into Garugaru, whom the Pretty Cure must save.

Niko (ニコ)
Voiced by: Kana Ueda
A unicorn who is the leader and creator of Niko Garden, who Mey Mey worked for as a butler until she went missing after Gaou's attack. After Niko Garden is restored, she is reborn as an egg that later hatches. Though she threatens to take away the Cures' powers to confront Gaou when Torame and Zakuro send the Gaogaons to attack Animal Town, she agrees to lend them her power after realizing that they share the same goal of saving the inhabitants of Niko Garden. After granting them the power of the Diamond Ribbon Castle and the Diamond Ribbon Styles, allowing them to purify Gaogaons with Eternal Bond Shower, she moves into Iroha's house. She later regains her original human-like form through the Nikoniko Power of the humans and animals in Animal Town. Following the final battle, she returns to Niko Garden with Mey Mey.

Mey Mey (メエメエ, Mēmē)
Voiced by: Shinnosuke Tachibana
A sheep-like Niko Animal who once resided in Niko Garden and worked as a butler. He was transformed into a Garugaru after Gaou's attack, but after Cure Wonderful purifies and saves him, he decides to support the Cures in saving the Niko Animals and Kirarin Animals. Following the final battle, he returns to Niko Garden with Niko, who gives him permission to visit Earth.

Niko Animals (ニコアニマル, Niko Animaru)
Voiced by: Yūki Kodaira (ostrich), Yuko Iida (hedgehog & squirrel), Tomoko Ikeda (alpaca), Misato Matsuoka (monkey) & Shinya Takahashi (frog)
Animals that live in Niko Garden and were corrupted and transformed into Garugaru after Gaou's attack. The Pretty Cure work to save them and bring them back to Niko Garden.

=== Kirarin Animals ===
The Kirarin Animals (キラリンアニマル, Kirarin Animaru) are a special type of Niko Animal, which each grant a special ability to the Cures.

Kirarin Rabbit (キラリンウサギ, Kirarin Usagi)
Voiced by: Misato Matsuoka
The first Kirarin Animal to appear. It has the ability to enhance hearing.

Kirarin Penguin (キラリンペンギン, Kirarin Pengin)
Voiced by: Yuko Iida
The second Kirarin Animal to appear. It has the ability to generate ice and slide on it.

Kirarin Lion (キラリンライオン, Kirarin Raion)
Voiced by: Tomoko Ikeda
The third Kirarin Animal to appear. It has the ability to enhance speed.

Kirarin Bear (キラリンベアー, Kirarin Beā)
Voiced by: Yukina Shuto
The fourth Kirarin Animal to appear. It has the ability to enhance strength.

Kirarin Fawn (キラリンコジカ, Kirarin Kojika)
Voiced by: Hana Shimano
The fifth Kirarin Animal to appear. It has the ability to enhance jumping.

Kirarin Hamster (キラリンハムスター, Kirarin Hamusutā)
Voiced by: Aika Wakuno
The sixth Kirarin Animal to appear. It has the ability to shrink.

Kirarin Fox (キラリンキツネ, Kirarin Kitsune)
Voiced by: Chiwa Saitō
The seventh Kirarin Animal to appear. It has the ability to shapeshift.

Kirarin Panda (キラリンパンダ, Kirarin Panda)
Voiced by: Mari Kiyohara
The eighth Kirarin Animal to appear. It has the ability to put others to sleep.

Kirarin Swan (キラリンスワン, Kirarin Suwan)
Voiced by: Fū Hirohara
The ninth and final Kirarin Animal to appear. It has the ability to fly.

=== Gaou-tachi ===
The Gaou-tachi (ガオウたち) are the main antagonists of the series, who are the vengeful spirits of Japanese wolves that went extinct a hundred years ago. Prior to the events of the series, they attacked Niko Garden, corrupting the Kirarin Animals and Niko Animals and transforming them into Garugaru using the damaged Niko Diamond's power. They aim to destroy humanity as revenge for them causing the extinction of their species.

==== Leader ====
Gaou (ガオウ) / Subaru (昴/スバル)
Voiced by: Takeo Ōtsuka
The mysterious leader of the Gaou-tachi and the main antagonist of the series, who was responsible for attacking Niko Garden and transforming its inhabitants into Garugaru and harbors hatred towards humanity. He can empower the Garugaru, as seen when he empowers the hamster Garugaru, granting it the ability to shrink others in addition to itself. Midway through the series, he revives his companions, Torame and Zakuro, inside the two wolf statues at Toboe Shrine and sends them to awaken the Garugaru while he recovers from his attack on Niko Garden. After reawakening, he arrives in Animal Town and uses up his power attempting to transform Komugi into a Gaogaon, leading him to retreat after her bond with Iroha returns her to normal and the Cures purify a bat Gaogaon that Zakuro summoned. He is later revealed to be Subaru, a human teen who lived 150 years ago and befriended the original Gaou and his wolf pack after healing Gaou's injured leg, but was separated from Gaou after the villagers forbade him from going to Mt. Toboe. His diary, which Karasuma found in the Mirror Stone Shrine and gave to Satoru, revealed this part of his past. During the final battle, "Gaou" is revealed to be the spirit of Subaru; after Gaou died protecting him and he sacrificed himself to protect the remaining wolves, his soul laid dormant in Toboe Shrine until he resurrected himself with a wolf claw and his hatred fused with Gaou's claw, with him assuming his identity in the name of revenge. After he attempts to revive Gaou and his wolf companions by combining Niko's power with the Mirror Stone to make a wish, he shatters the Mirror Stone and fuses with the Niko Diamond, transforming into a monstrous wolf. However, the Cures purify him and return him to normal after Komugi tells him about the real Gaou's feelings. After being purified, he, along with Zakuro and Gaou, depart for the afterlife with Torame and the other wolves.

==== Generals ====
Zakuro (ザクロ)
Voiced by: Mai Nakahara
One of Gaou's generals, a Japanese wolf who can assume a human form resembling a young woman. She, along with Torame, are revived in the two wolf statues at Toboe Shrine. She has a crush on Gaou and often competes with Torame for his attention. Despite her hatred towards humanity, Zakuro cares for her wolf companions, especially Gaou. After he attacks Animal Town, she helps the Cures save Subaru after realizing that he has gone too far and that this is not what Gaou would have wanted. After he is purified, she returns to her original wolf form and, along with him and Gaou, depart for the afterlife with Torame and the other wolves.

Torame (トラメ)
Voiced by: Eriko Matsui
One of Gaou's generals, a Japanese wolf who can assume a human form resembling a young boy. He, along with Zakuro, are revived in the two wolf statues at Toboe Shrine. He is energetic and fun-loving and admires Gaou, often competing with Zakuro for his attention. Despite his hatred towards humanity, he has a kind heart, as he realizes humans can care for animals when he orders the Tyrannosaurus Gaogaon to stop attacking so that Otsuru can get Fuku to Friendly Animal Hospital & Salon. After playing with the Cures, Torame, free of his anger and resentment, allowing the Cures to purify him and move on to the afterlife. This turns the statue Torame possessed into a version of his original pup form before dying, which Komugi and Iroha return to Toboe Shrine. His soul later returns in the finale (along side the wolf pack), for Subaru Gaou and Zakuro, going all together into the afterlife.

==== Monsters ====
Garugaru (ガルガル)
Voiced by: Shinya Takahashi
The main monsters of the series. They are born from corrupted Niko Animals or Kirarin Animals that are trapped in eggs, which eventually hatch to wreak havoc under Gaou's orders.

Gaogaon (ガオガオーン)
Voiced by: Shinya Takahashi
A more powerful type of Garugaru that Zakuro and Torame summon. Torame empowers the Garugaru eggs, while Zakuro transforms normal animals of Animal Town into Gaogaon by corrupting their hearts. Gaou can also create Gaogaon by corrupting the hearts of animals with dark clouds he summons, as he intended to do with Komugi.

=== Cures' family members ===
Youko Inukai (犬飼陽子, Inukai Yōko)
Voiced by: Yūki Kodaira
Iroha's mother, who works as a veterinarian at Friendly Animal Hospital & Salon. Along with Tsuyoshi, she later learns that Komugi can talk and transform into a human, as well as of the Niko Garden from Mey Mey.

Tsuyoshi Inukai (犬飼剛, Inukai Tsuyoshi)
Voiced by: Hiroshi Shirokuma
Iroha's father, who owns and runs the Friendly Animal Hospital & Salon. Along with Youko, he later learns that Komugi can talk and transform into a human, as well as of the Niko Garden from Mey Mey.

Sumire Nekoyashiki (猫屋敷すみれ, Nekoyashiki Sumire)
Voiced by: Chiwa Saitō
Mayu's mother, who runs Pretty Holic. She later learns that Yuki can talk and transform into a human.

Takayuki Nekoyashiki (猫屋敷貴行, Nekoyashiki Takayuki)
Voiced by: Kenji Fukuda
Mayu's father, who works overseas as a photographer. He later moves to Animal Town with Mayu and Sumire after he returns from his latest work in Africa.

=== Animal Town residents ===
Ema (えま)
Voiced by: Hana Shimano
A girl who owns a Pomeranian named Pon.

Pon (ポン)
Ema's pet Pomeranian.

Inui (戊井)
Voiced by: Haruno Inoue
A girl who owns a Poodle named Choco.

Choco (チョコ, Choko)
Voiced by: Tomoko Ikeda
Inui's pet Poodle.

Mitsuko Okuma (大熊 みつ子, Ōkuma Mitsuko)
Voiced by: Yuko Iida
Iroha, Mayu and Satoru's classmate, who, along with her parents, runs a farm in Animal Town called Okuma Farm (大熊農園, Ōkuma Fāmu). She later participates in the Animal Calendar project, where Takayuki takes pictures of her and her cows.

Nanami Kanie (蟹江 七海, Kanie Nanami)
Voiced by: Hana Shimano
Iroha, Mayu and Satoru's classmate. She owns two freshwater crabs named Zuwai (ズワイ) and Taraba (タラバ), who Takayuki takes pictures of for the Animal Calendar project.

Youda (羊田, Yōda), Torieda (鳥枝), Ushigome (牛込), Kamogawa (鴨川), Takayama (鷹山) & Saruwatari (猿渡)
Voiced by: Tomoko Ikeda (Youda & Saruwatari), Misato Matsuoka (Torieda), Aika Wakuno (Ushigome), Yuki Kodaira (Kamogawa) & Masahiro Yamanaka (Takayama)
Iroha, Mayu, and Satoru's classmates. Torieda owns a cockatiel named Pea (ピー) who Takayuki takes pictures of for the Animal Calendar project.

Sho Ikari (猪狩勝, Ikari Shō)
Voiced by: Shohei Komatsu
Iroha, Mayu, and Satoru's classmate, who plays soccer. After Komugi impresses him with her soccer skills on her first day of school, he begins to see her as his rival. He owns a mini pig who Takayuki takes pictures of for the Animal Calendar project.

Kiyoshi Babazono (馬場園清, Babazono Kiyoshi)
Voiced by: Mitsuru Takakuwa
Iroha, Mayu, and Satoru's homeroom teacher. He owns a horse named Bruno (ブルーノ, Burūno), who Takayuki takes pictures of for the Animal Calendar project.

Kitsunezaki (狐崎) & Tanukihara (狸原)
Voiced by: Haruno Inoue, (Kitsunezaki) & Seiko Ueda (Tanukihara)
Two classmates of Iroha, Mayu, and Satoru and members of the drama club, who admire Yuki and wish for her to join the club. They produce a play about the past of a wolf and his human friend, Subaru.

Karasuma (烏丸)
Voiced by: Yukina Shuto
A classmate of Iroha, Mayu, and Satoru. Her parents run the Mirror Stone Sanctuary in Animal Town.

Otsuru, Okame & Oshika (お鶴、お亀、お鹿)
Voiced by: Natsuki Aikawa (Otsuru), Mari Kiyohara (Okame) & Yūki Kodaira (Oshika)
A trio of regular customers at Pretty Holic. When Otsuru was in high school, her dog, Suzu, died, and she vowed to never adopt a dog again so that she would not be saddened when they died. However, she later adopted Fuku at an adoption event. Following Fuku's death, she enshrines her at the Mirror Stone Shrine.

Fuku (フク)
Voiced by: Chiwa Saitō
Otsuru's pet dog, whom she adopted at an adoption event after Suzu's death and whom Iroha has known since childhood. As the Cures and Otsuru celebrate the anniversary of her adoption, her condition deteriorates and she dies, but she is able to say goodbye to Otsuru after Niko gives her the strength to.

Inuzuka (犬束)
Voiced by: Toa Yukinari
A dog trainer and friend of Iroha, who is a frequenter of her parents' business. She owns a Border Collie named Witt.

Witt (ウィット, Uitto)
Inuzuka's pet Border Collie, with which he participates in agility dog competitions.

Mayor Washio (鷲尾市長, Washio Shichō)
Voiced by: Wataru Takagi
The mayor of Animal Town.

Andy (アンディ, Andi)
Voiced by: Ryōsuke Hara
A sheepdog of the Okuma Farm's sheepdog show.

Keiichi (圭一)
Voiced by: Ryōsuke Hara
A young man friend of Iroha, who is training his dog, Keiji, to become a police dog.

Keiji (ケイジ)
Voiced by: Ryōsuke Hara
Keiichi's pet dog, who is training to become a police dog.

Ayako Yuuki (結城 綾子, Yūki Ayako)
Voiced by: Kei Hayami
A volunteer at the animal shelter where Komugi was left after her owner, Kurihara, was placed in a nursing home two years ago. She reunites with Komugi when she visits Friendly Animal Hospital & Salon and tells the Inukai family about Kurihara.

Kurihara (栗原)
Voiced by: Nobuo Tobita
A kindly elderly man and Komugi's original owner. Two years prior to the events of the series, he was placed in a nursing home due to his frail condition and age. While looking for him, Komugi ran away from the animal shelter where she was housed temporarily and met Iroha. He later learns that Komugi can transform into a human and asks her to stay with Iroha. After remembering Kurihara, Komugi begins to see him as her grandfather, as she calls him "grandpa".

Gaou (ガオウ)
Voiced by: Shinya Takahashi
The original Gaou and leader of the wolf pack, who was Subaru's friend and sacrificed himself to protect him. His soul started to communicate with Komugi in mid-season and in the finale both he and Subaru reunite at last. After Subaru is purified, he, along with him and Zakuro, depart for the afterlife with the other wolves.

=== Others ===
Yuma Chiran (知覧友真, Chiran Yūma)
Voiced by: Fū Hirohara
Mayu's friend from her old school who was close to her, but stopped being her friend after a misunderstanding, believing that she was ignoring her when she was actually concentrating on making her a birthday present. She and Mayu reconcile after she returns to Animal Town after seeing Mayu's posts on CureSta about Yuki. She lives in Mayu's hometown.

Kotetsu (こてつ)
Yuma's pet chinchilla. While she and her mother are on their way home from taking him to the vet for a checkup, Zakuro transforms him into a Gaogaon. However, the Cures rescue him and reunite him with Yuma.

Yuma's Mother (友真の母, Yūma no Haha)
Voiced by: Kayo Ishida
Yuma's mother, who accompanies her to Animal Town to take Kotetsu to a check-up at Friendly Animal Hospital & Salon.

Shinnosuke Nohara (野原 しんのすけ, Nohara Shinnosuke)
Voiced by: Yumiko Kobayashi
The main protagonist of Crayon Shin-chan, who appears in episode 16 as a guest along with Shiro. In episode 1233 of Crayon Shin-chan, he transforms into Cure Oshiri (キュアオシリィ, Kyua Oshiri) to fight against a Garugaru.

Shiro (シロ)
Voiced by: Mari Mashiba
Shinnosuke's pet Maltese from Crayon Shin-chan, who appears in episode 16 as a guest along with Shinnosuke. In episode 1233 of Crayon Shin-chan, he transforms into Cure Wataame (キュアワタアメ, Kyua Watāme) to fight against a Garugaru.

Buriburizaemon (ぶりぶりざえもん)
Voiced by: Hiroshi Kamiya
A minor character from Crayon Shin-chan. In episode 1233 of Crayon Shin-chan, he is transformed into a boar Garugaru, but is purified after Cure Oshiri accidentally kisses him.

Uta Sakura (咲良うた, Sakura Uta) / Cure Idol (キュアアイドル, Kyua Aidoru)
Voiced by: Misato Matsuoka
The protagonist of You and Idol Pretty Cure.

=== Movie characters ===
Natsuki (ナツキ)
Voiced by: Kana Hanazawa
The creator of the game Dokidoki♡TanuKingdom.

Mujina (ムジナ)
Voiced by: Kenta Miyake
The main antagonist of Wonderful Pretty Cure! The Movie! Doki Doki! An Epic Adventure In The Game World. He is a tanuki in Dokidoki♡TanuKingdom and the boss of Ponta and Pokota.

Ponta & Pokota (ポンタ & ポコタ)
Voiced by: Junpei Gotō (Ponta) and Shūsuke Fukutoku (Pokota)
Characters in Dokidoki♡TanuKingdom. They are tanuki brothers and Mujina's henchmen.

== Development ==
The series' trademark was first confirmed by Toei in November 2023, and the official website launched on November 30, 2023. The series was fully revealed on January 7, 2024, along with Toei announcing merchandise related to the series.

The theme of animals was confirmed by ABC Animation producer Kanako Tada, who explained that "Nowadays, it has become common to bring various animals into our homes, such as dogs, cats, rabbits, and birds. For me, dogs are important companions. Irreplaceable animals that shower us with great love... Although they may not speak the same language, there is probably an indescribable bond between animals and their owners." He said the theme is also connected to the bond between humans and its pets as an animal becoming a Pretty Cure for the first time, stating "In this Pretty Cure series, the main character, the dog Komugi, changes into a human form, She speaks with its owner Iroha in human language. We will then communicate our feelings to each other and deepen our bond. However, in the real world, animals and humans cannot communicate with each other. Komugi's lines spoken in this work are beyond the realm of imagination. "This is what the dog is probably thinking." You may worry that this is just the human ego. However, precisely because we cannot communicate with each other, we need to think deeply about the feelings of animals. The important thing is to make an effort to get to know the other person. I believe that after that, "compassion" is born, wishing for the other person's happiness. The most important thing is to understand each other without imposing your feelings on others."

Maki Takahashi of Toei Animation said that the theme of bonds is important, as is the relationships between the main characters: "The theme of this work is the bond with animals. Think about someone important to you and act accordingly. The relationship of "family" and "best friends" is the same for both humans and animals. This idea is reflected in our catchphrase: to dream, never giving up, standing up on your own feet, sharing with your friends, believe in your friends, act for someone and thinking about someone. The power of the feelings depicted and connected in the history of Pretty Cure. Even if we look different, even if we don't speak the same language, if we have a caring heart, it will definitely reach our hearts. We will carefully depict such a "Pretty Cure" appearance through the bond with animals."

The lead characters' voice actors released statements discussing their roles. Maria Naganawa stated that "I never thought that I would become a Pretty Cure, so I felt like I couldn't believe it. Immediately after that, I burst into tears with so many emotions: happiness, desire to do my best, and gratitude." Atsumi Tanezaki, who previously voiced Puca in Pretty Cure All Stars F stated that "When it was decided that I would be appearing in the movie Pretty Cure All Stars F, I was very happy and honored to be able to work on Pretty Cure, but I never expected that I would be given this opportunity in the TV series as well. I watched many Pretty Cure characters in the movies, and felt the bond that everyone has created over the past year in each series, from the characters to the cast members. When I was recording for the movie, I couldn't see it with my eyes, but I could definitely feel it, and I was so jealous that I was so happy, and I thought, oh, I can do that too..."

== Media ==
=== Anime ===
Wonderful Pretty Cure! aired from February 4, 2024, to January 26, 2025, on Japan's ANN stations, replacing Soaring Sky! Pretty Cure in its timeslot. Chihaya Yoshitake performs the opening theme, "Wonderful PreCure! Evolution!!" (Japanese: わんだふるぷりきゅあ！evolution!!, Hepburn: Wandafuru Purikyua! Evoryūshon!!). Moeha Nochimoto and Ami Ishii perform the first ending theme, "Fun Fun Wonderful Days!" (Japanese: FUN☆FUN☆わんだふるDAYS！, Hepburn: Fan☆Fan☆Wandafuru DAYS!) and the second ending theme, "Happiness Evolution♡" (Japanese: しあわせえぼりゅ～しょん♡, Hepburn: Shiawase Eboryu~shon♡). Erika Fukasawa composes the series's music.

Crunchyroll streamed the series with original Japanese audio and English subtitles.

=== Films ===
A movie based on the anime, Wonderful Pretty Cure the Movie: A Thrilling Adventure In The Game World! (わんだふるぷりきゅあ！ざ・むーびー！ドキドキ♡ゲームの世界で大冒険, Wandafuru Purikyua! Za・Mūbī! Dokidoki ♡ Gēmu no Sekai de Daibōken!), was released in Japanese movie theaters on September 13, 2024. It features the Cures from Witchy Pretty Cure! and Soaring Sky! Pretty Cure.

You and Idol Pretty Cure the Movie: For You! Our Kirakilala Concert! (映画キミとアイドルプリキュア♪ お待たせ！キミに届けるキラッキライブ！, Eiga Kimi to Aidoru Purikyua ♪ Omatase! Kimi ni Todokeru Kirakiraibu!), was released on September 12, 2025.

Star Detective Precure! The Movie: The Mysterious Garden and a Secret Pair (映画名探偵プリキュア！不思議な庭と2人の秘密, Eiga Meitantei Purikyua! Fushigina niwa to 2-ri no himitsu) was released on September 18, 2026.

=== Merchandise ===
Bandai Namco Holdings, under the Bandai branding, handles merchandising for the series, which includes toys and related goods. The fourth incarnation of the Pretty Holic cosmetic goods was released upon its debut.

=== Music ===
==== Opening ====
Song	Artist	Episodes
"Wonderful PreCure! Evolution!!" (わんだふるぷりきゅあ！evolution!!)	Chihaya Yoshitake	1 - 50

==== Endings ====
Song	Artist	Episodes
"Fun Fun Wonderful Days!" (FUN☆FUN☆わんだふるDAYS！)	Moeha Nochimoto & Ami Ishii	1 - 22
"Happiness Evolution♡" (しあわせえぼりゅ～しょん♡)	Moeha Nochimoto & Ami Ishii	23 - 49
Happy≒Future	Chihaya Yoshitake & Moeha Nochimoto	33 - 34
Wonderful Smile	Ami Ishii	50

== See also ==
- Super Hero Time and Nichi Asa Kids Time – The timeslot blocks by ANN in Japan, which the series is part of.

== Notes ==
Preceded by Soaring Sky! Pretty Cure	Wonderful PreCure! 2024–2025	Succeeded by You and Idol Pretty Cure
