= Ai Kakuma =

Japanese voice actress (born 1988)

- 加隈 亜衣
- Born: September 9, 1988 (age 38); Fukuoka Prefecture, Japan
- Occupation: Voice actress
- Years active: 2011–present
- Agent: Mausu Promotion
- Notable work: WIXOSS as Ruko Kominato; The Asterisk War as Julis-Alexia von Riessfeld; Amagi Brilliant Park as Isuzu Sento; D.Gray-man Hallow as Lenalee Lee; The King of Fighters series as Yuri Sakazaki; Fire Emblem: Three Houses as Edelgard von Hresvelg; A Certain Magical Index as Misaka Worst; Super HxEros as Kirara Hoshino; Mushoku Tensei as Eris Boreas Greyrat; Reincarnated as a Sword as Fran; Healin' Good Pretty Cure as Rabirin; Soaring Sky! Pretty Cure as Mashiro Nijigaoka/Cure Prism

Ai Kakuma (加隈 亜衣, Kakuma Ai; born September 9, 1988) is a Japanese voice actress from Fukuoka Prefecture.

== Filmography ==
=== Anime television series ===
2012

- Campione! as Hikari Mariya
- Haiyore! Nyaruko-san as Female Student (ep.10)
- JoJo's Bizarre Adventure as Customer B (ep.10)

2013

- Day Break Illusion as Female Student (ep.4)
- Dog & Scissors as Hami Oosawa
- Genshiken: Second Generation as Kenjiro Hata (Female)
- Stella Women's Academy, High School Division Class C3 as Akane & Moe Seto
- Sunday Without God as Memepo Gedenburg, Mimiita Gedenburg

2014

- Aikatsu! as Noel Otoshiro (ep.71 onwards)
- Aldnoah.Zero as Nina Klein
- Amagi Brilliant Park as Isuzu Sento
- Bladedance of Elementalers as Terminus Est
- Daimidaler the Sound Robot as Macaroni
- Dragonar Academy as Primrose Shelly
- If Her Flag Breaks as Hakua Berserker Bladefield
- JoJo's Bizarre Adventure: Stardust Crusaders as Female Student E (ep.2), Tourist B (ep.5)
- Log Horizon 2 as Mikakage
- Magi: The Kingdom of Magic as Sana
- Rail Wars! as Miho Nanao
- Selector Infected Wixoss as Rūko Kominato
- Selector Spread Wixoss as Rūko Kominato
- Terraformars as Erika Nakanojō, Announcer (ep.1)
- Witch Craft Works as Maid (ep.2)
- Your Lie in April as Girl (ep.2), Store Clerk (ep.3)

2015

- Aikatsu! as Noel Otoshiro and Leona Stroop
- Bikini Warriors as Mage
- Food Wars: Shokugeki no Soma as Mayumi Kurase
- High School DxD BorN as Rossweisse
- Knights of Sidonia: Battle for Planet Nine as Chimera Controller
- Maria the Virgin Witch as Anne
- Mikagura School Suite as Asuhi Imizu
- Mobile Suit Gundam: Iron-Blooded Orphans as Almiria Bauduin
- Monster Musume as Lala
- Rokka: Braves of the Six Flowers as Chamo Rosso
- The Asterisk War as Julis-Alexia van Riessfel
- Utawarerumono: The False Faces as Rurutie

2016

- Brave Witches as Hikari Karibuchi
- D.Gray-man Hallow as Lenalee Lee
- God Eater as Iroha Utsugi
- Naruto Shippuden as Chino
- The Asterisk War 2nd Season as Julis-Alexia van Riessfel
- The Lost Village as Lovepon, Boy

2017

- 18if as Airi Kojima
- A Sister's All You Need as Miyako Shirakawa
- Children of the Whales as Neri, Aíma
- Clockwork Planet as RyuZU
- Hand Shakers as Mayumi Akutagawa
- Knight's & Magic as Nora Frykberg
- Konohana Kitan as Sakura
- Magical Circle Guru Guru as Iruku (ep.3, 9)
- NTR: Netsuzou Trap as Yuma Okazaki
- Seven Mortal Sins as Sloth Demon Lord Belphegor (ep.1–2, 5–6, 9–12)

2018

- A Certain Magical Index III as Misaka Worst
- Amanchu! Advance as Misaki Kotori
- As Miss Beelzebub Likes as Sargatanas
- Conception as Aafii
- High School DxD Hero as Rossweisse
- Kakuriyo: Bed and Breakfast for Spirits as Oryō
- Last Period as Erika
- Lostorage Conflated WIXOSS as Rūko Kominato
- Märchen Mädchen as Agathe Arier
- Yuuna and the Haunted Hot Springs as Nonko Arahabaki

2019

- Demon Slayer: Kimetsu no Yaiba as Makomo
- To the Abandoned Sacred Beasts as Nancy Schaal Bancroft
- Arifureta: From Commonplace to World's Strongest as Aiko Hatayama
- Val × Love as Itsuyo Saotome
- Azur Lane as Unicorn, Takao
- Aikatsu on Parade! as Noel Otoshiro

2020

- Bofuri as May
- Healin' Good Pretty Cure as Rabirin
- Fruits Basket 2nd Season as Machi Kuraki
- Super HxEros as Kirara Hoshino
- The Misfit of Demon King Academy as Menou Historia
- King's Raid: Successors of the Will as Frey

2021

- Mushoku Tensei: Jobless Reincarnation as Eris Boreas Greyrat
- That Time I Got Reincarnated as a Slime as Albis
- Sonny Boy as Aki
- Restaurant to Another World 2 as Myra
- Bakugan: Geogan Rising as Crystal Blue

2022

- Chimimo as Hazuki Onigami
- Utawarerumono: Mask of Truth as Rurutie
- Reincarnated as a Sword as Fran
- Arknights: Prelude to Dawn as Franka

2023

- Bofuri 2nd Season as May
- Kubo Won't Let Me Be Invisible as Hazuki Kudō
- Reborn to Master the Blade: From Hero-King to Extraordinary Squire as Rafinha Bilford
- The Magical Revolution of the Reincarnated Princess and the Genius Young Lady as Ilia Coral
- Soaring Sky! Pretty Cure as Mashiro Nijigaoka/Cure Prism
- Ippon Again! as Natsu Umehara
- I Got a Cheat Skill in Another World and Became Unrivaled in the Real World, Too as Luna
- Blue Orchestra as Ritsuko Akine
- My Love Story with Yamada-kun at Lv999 as Runa Sasaki, Ruri-hime
- The Masterful Cat Is Depressed Again Today as Yuri Shibasaki
- Reign of the Seven Spellblades as Vera Miligan
- The Demon Sword Master of Excalibur Academy as Roselia
- The Eminence in Shadow 2nd Season as Mary
- Ron Kamonohashi's Forbidden Deductions as Older Sister

2024

- Tales of Wedding Rings as Saphir
- Fluffy Paradise as Néma
- Tsukimichi: Moonlit Fantasy 2nd Season as Hibiki Otonashi
- Brave Bang Bravern! as Miyu Katō
- Mr. Villain's Day Off as Shinonome Pink
- Re:Monster as Gobmi
- Whisper Me a Love Song as Kaori Tachibana
- Dragon Ball Daima as Mini Chi-Chi

2025

- Bogus Skill "Fruitmaster" as Hanabōshi
- Magic Maker: How to Make Magic in Another World as Marie
- Grisaia: Phantom Trigger the Animation as Kuroe Samejima
- Flower and Asura as Pokoko Potanpoko
- Food for the Soul as Kurea Furudate
- The Unaware Atelier Master as Akuri
- Hell Teacher: Jigoku Sensei Nube as Yukime
- May I Ask for One Final Thing? as Terenezza Hopkins
- With You, Our Love Will Make It Through as Kisara

2026

- My Stepmother and Stepsisters Aren't Wicked as Homare Takanashi
- Magical Explorer as Ludie

2027

- My Sword Saint Master Is Too Cute to Live With! as Liza Parsandra

=== Original video animation (OVA) ===
- Age 12 (2014), Hanabi Ayase

=== Original net animation (ONA) ===
- Momokuri (2015–16), Yuki Kurihara
- The King of Fighters: Destiny (2017), Yuri Sakazaki
- 7 Seeds (2019), Kurumi Shikano
- Gundam Build Divers Re:Rise (2019), Freddie
- Aikatsu on Parade! Dream Story (2020), Noel Otoshiro
- The Grimm Variations (2024), Cat
- Bullet/Bullet (2025), Afternoon Tea
- Yu-Gi-Oh! Card Game The Chronicles, Silvy
- Yu-Gi-Oh! Card Game The Chronicles, Silvia

=== Theatrical animation ===
- Majocco Shimai no Yoyo to Nene (2013), Nene
- Selector Destructed WIXOSS (2016), Rūko Kominato
- Fairy Tail: Dragon Cry (2017), Riana
- Batman Ninja (2018), Catwoman
- Healin' Good Pretty Cure the Movie: GoGo! Big Transformation! The Town of Dreams (2021), Rabirin
- Pompo: The Cinéphile (2021), Mystia
- Pretty Cure All Stars F (2023), Mashiro Nijigaoka / Cure Prism, Rabirin
- Wonderful Pretty Cure! The Movie: A Grand Adventure in a Thrilling Game World! (2024), Mashiro Nijigaoka / Cure Prism
- You and Idol Pretty Cure the Movie: For You! Our Kirakilala Concert! (2025), Mashiro Nijigaoka / Cure Prism

=== Video games ===
- BlazBlue: Continuum Shift Extend (2011), Operator
- Ciel nosurge (2012), Ion (Ionasal.kkll.Preciel)
- Hakuisei Renai Shoukougun RE:Therapy (Claris)
- Tottemo E Mahjong (2013), Shizu Tsubakino
- Tokyo 7th Sisters (2014), Rona Tsunomori
- Ar Nosurge (2014), Ion (Ionasal kkll Preciel)
- Kadenz fermata//Akkord：fortissimo (2014), Camellia
- The Witcher 3: Wild Hunt (2015), Cerys An Craite
- Criminal Girls 2: Party Favors (2015), Kuroe
- Tokyo Xanadu (2015), Sora Ikushima
- Cytus Omega (2015), MIU
- I Am Setsuna (2016), Setsuna
- Uppers (2016), Karen Takebayashi
- The King of Fighters XIV (2016), Yuri Sakazaki
- Valkyrie Anatomia: The Origin (2016), Norn
- Dream Girlfriend (2016)
- Girls' Frontline (2016), Type 100, VSK-94
- Granblue Fantasy (2016), La Coiffe
- Blue Reflection (2017), Sarasa Morikawa
- Azur Lane (2017), HMS Unicorn, HMS Exeter & IJN Takao
- Magia Record: Puella Magi Madoka Magica Side Story (2017), Kanoko Yayoi and Melissa de Vignolles
- Alice Gear Aegis (2018), Chieri Kondō
- The King of Fighters All Star (2018), Yuri Sakazaki
- SNK Heroines: Tag Team Frenzy (2018), Yuri Sakazaki
- Dragalia Lost (2018), Lucretia
- Fire Emblem: Three Houses (2019), Edelgard von Hresvelg
- Arknights (2019), Frostleaf, Franka
- Another Eden (2019), Tiramisu
- Ash Arms (2019), BT-5, B-24 Liberator
- War of the Visions: Final Fantasy Brave Exvius (2020), Miranda
- Genshin Impact (2020), Rosaria
- Fate/Grand Order (2021), Assassin (Kiichi Hōgen)
- SINoALICE (2021), Catwoman
- The King of Fighters XV (2022), Yuri Sakazaki
- AI: The Somnium Files – Nirvana Initiative (2022), Tama
- Counter:Side (2022), Naielle Bluesteel
- Goddess of Victory: Nikke (2022), Ludmilla, Laplace
- The 13th Month (2022), The Corpse Princess
- Da Capo 5 (2023), Mizuha Sakuragi
- Blue Archive (2023), Sakurako Utazumi
- 404 Game Re:set (2023), Out Run
- War of the Visions: Final Fantasy Brave Exvius (2023), Miranda (Valentine)
- Another Code: Recollection (2024), Janet Rice, Kelly Crusoe
- Fatal Fury: City of the Wolves (2025), Yuri Sakazaki, Marie Heinlein
- Neverness to Everness (2026), Ellie

== Appearances in other media ==
=== Drama CD ===
- Kaden Tantei wa Shizuka ni Warau (2012), Magical Rori Kosei Mirun-chan
- Last Game (2016), Momoka Tachibana
- Ecstas Online (2016), Ririko Asagiri

=== Radio ===
- Anime Tantei-dan 3

=== Narration ===
- Arc System Works Family Series PV

=== Vocaloid ===
- Voice provider for Rana

=== Dubbing ===
- Batman Ninja, Catwoman

=== Live-action film ===
- My Love Story with Yamada-kun at Lv999 (2025), Princess Ruri (voice)
