= Wonderful Pretty Cure! The Movie: A Grand Adventure in a Thrilling Game World! =

2024 film by Naoki Miyahara

- Cover of the DVD release by Marvelous!
- Kanji: わんだふるぷりきゅあ！ざ・むーびー！ドキドキ♡ゲームの世界で大冒険！
- Revised Hepburn: Wandafuru Purikyua! Za Mūbī! Dokidoki♡Gēmu no Sekai de Daibōken!
- Directed by: Naoki Miyahara
- Screenplay by: Yoichi Katō
- Based on: Pretty Cure by Izumi Todo
- Starring: Maria Naganawa; Atsumi Tanezaki; Satsumi Matsuda; Reina Ueda; Akira Sekine; Ai Kakuma; Ayumu Murase; Ayaka Nanase; Aoi Koga; Rie Takahashi; Yui Horie; Saori Hayami; Ayaka Saitō; Takuma Terashima; Shinnosuke Tachibana
- Cinematography: Yuki Oshima; Kanan Sasaki
- Music by: Erika Fukusawa
- Production company: Toei Animation
- Distributed by: Toei Company, Ltd.
- Release date: September 13, 2024
- Running time: 71 minutes
- Country: Japan
- Language: Japanese

Wonderful Pretty Cure! The Movie: A Grand Adventure in a Thrilling Game World! (Japanese: わんだふるぷりきゅあ！ざ・むーびー！ドキドキ♡ゲームの世界で大冒険！, Hepburn: Wandafuru Purikyua! Za Mūbī! Dokidoki♡Gēmu no Sekai de Daibōken!) is a 2024 Japanese animated action fantasy film based on the Pretty Cure franchise created by Izumi Todo, and its twenty-first series, Wonderful Pretty Cure!. The film is directed by Naoki Miyahara, written by Yoichi Katō and produced by Toei Animation. The film was released in Japan on September 13, 2024.

Featuring the Pretty Cure teams from Soaring Sky! Pretty Cure and Witchy Pretty Cure!, Komugi and her allies must escape the world of a video game from a suspicious tanuki gang.

== Synopsis ==
Komougi and Iroha, as well as Yuki and Mayu are sucked into a video game called "DokiDoki Tanu Kingdom" developed by Natsuki and gets separated. The Pretty Cures must reunite with each other and escape the game, while encountering suspicious tanuki gang.

== Voice cast ==
- Maria Naganawa as Komugi Inukai/Cure Wonderful
- Atsumi Tanezaki as Iroha Inukai/Cure Friendy
- Satsumi Matsuda as Yuki Nekoyashiki/Cure Nyammy
- Reina Ueda as Mayu Nekoyashiki/Cure Lillian
- Takuma Terashima as Satoru Toyama
- Yuichi Nakamura as Daifuku Toyama
- Shinnosuke Tachibana as Mey Mey
- Kana Ueda as Niko
- Akira Sekine as Sora Harewataru/Cure Sky
- Ai Kakuma as Mashiro Nijigaoka/Cure Prism
- Ayumu Murase as Tsubasa Yuunagi/Cure Wing
- Ayaka Nanase as Ageha Hijiri/Cure Butterfly
- Aoi Koga as Ellee/Cure Majesty
- Rie Takahashi as Mirai Asahina/Cure Miracle
- Yui Horie as Liko Izayoi/Cure Magical
- Saori Hayami as Kotoha Hanami/Cure Felice
- Ayaka Saitō as Mofurun
- Kana Hanazawa as Natsuki
- Kenta Miyake as Mujina
- Junpei Gotō as Ponta
- Shūsuke Fukutoku as Pokota

== Production ==
In March 2024, it was announced that a film based on Wonderful Pretty Cure! was in development. In June of that year, it was announced that Naoki Miyahara will direct the film at Toei Animation, with Yoichi Katō providing the screenplay, and character design by Risa Miyatani. It was also announced that it will feature Pretty Cure teams from both Soaring Sky! Pretty Cure and Witchy Pretty Cure!. Later in August, comedians Junpei Gotō and Shunsūke Fukutoku, also known as duo Jaru Jaru, was cast as Ponta and Pokota respectively, and Kana Hanazawa and Kenta Miyake as Natsuki and Mujina respectively. Yuichi Nakamura was cast as Daifuku's human form the following month.

The theme song for the film is "Happy≒Future" sung by Chihaya Yoshitake and Moeha Nochimoto, and the insert song is "Love's Bonds" (大好きのキズナ, Daisuki no Kizuna) by Ami Ishii and Rie Kitagawa.

== Release ==
The film was released in theaters in Japan on September 13, 2024.

== Reception ==
=== Box office ===
The film debuted at number 2 out of top 10 in the Japanese box office in its opening week.
