= Reina Ueda =

Japanese voice actress and singer

- 上田 麗奈
- Born: January 17, 1994 (age 32); Toyama, Toyama Prefecture, Japan
- Occupations: Voice actress; singer
- Years active: 2012–present
- Agent: 81 Produce
- Notable work: Aikatsu Stars! as Lily Shirogane; Wataten!: An Angel Flew Down to Me as Miyako Hoshino; Demon Slayer: Kimetsu no Yaiba as Kanao Tsuyuri; SSSS.Gridman as Akane Shinjō; Darwin's Game as Shuka Karino; Dimension W as Mira Yurizaki; Project Sekai: Colorful Stage feat. Hatsune Miku as Honami Mochizuki; Kirby Star Allies as Francisca; Pokémon the Series: Sun & Moon as Mallow; Sakura Quest as Shiori Shinomiya; Bakuon!! as Hane Sakura; Chainsaw Man as Reze; Solo Leveling as Cha Hae-in; Bleach as Meninas McAllon; Wonderful PreCure! as Mayu Nekoyashiki / Cure Lillian; Blue Box as Chinatsu Kano; My Happy Marriage as Miyo Saimori; Takopi's Original Sin as Shizuka Kuze; This Monster Wants to Eat Me as Hinako Yaotose; Fruits Basket as Kisa Soma
- Musical career
- Genres: J-pop; Anison
- Instrument: Vocals
- Years active: 2016–present
- Label: Lantis
- Website: https://www.lantis.jp/reinaueda/

Reina Ueda (上田 麗奈, Ueda Reina; born January 17, 1994) is a Japanese voice actress and singer from Toyama Prefecture. She is affiliated with 81 Produce. Beginning her career as a voice actress in 2012, her first main role was Naru Sekiya, the protagonist of the 2014 anime series Hanayamata. She is also known for her roles as Mira Yurisaki in Dimension W, Hane Sakura in Bakuon!!, Mallow in Pokémon: Sun & Moon, Shiori Shinomiya in Sakura Quest, Akane Shinjō in SSSS.Gridman and Mayu Nekoyashiki / Cure Lillian in Wonderful PreCure!. She was one of the recipients of the Best New Actress Award in the 9th Seiyu Awards in 2015. She released a mini-album in 2016, and her first solo single in 2018.

== Biography ==
Ueda was born in Toyama Prefecture on January 17, 1994. From an early age, she had an interest in performing, joining her school's theater club in elementary. While a member of her junior high school's theater club, she became interested in becoming a voice actress after interacting with a club member who wanted to pursue that profession. She decided to become a voice actor because, among other reasons, she wanted to change her personality. During her third year of high school, she applied for a voice acting audition only three days before the deadline of it.

Ueda won the Second Class Grand Prix in an audition held by the agency 81 Produce in 2011, and formally joined the agency the following year. Her first role was in the anime series Inazuma Eleven: Chrono Stone. She also became part of the voice actor unit Anisoni∀ together with three other 81 Produce newcomers: Rie Takahashi, Chiyeri Hayashida, and Kayoto Tsumita. In 2013, she voiced 18 sisters in the anime series Tesagure! Bukatsu-mono.

In 2014, Ueda was cast in her first main role as Naru Sekiya, the protagonist of the anime series Hanayamata; she and her co-stars performed the series' opening theme "Hana wa Odoreya Iroha ni Ho" (花ハ踊レヤいろはにほ, Dancing in the Scent of Flowers) under the name Team Hanayamata. The following year, she was cast as Meika Katai in Mikagura School Suite, Mikan Akemi in My Monster Secret, and Elena Arshavina in World Break: Aria of Curse for a Holy Swordsman. She was also one of three recipients of the Best New Actress Award at the 9th Seiyu Awards.

In 2016, Ueda played the role of Hane Sakura, the protagonist of the anime series Bakuon!!; she and her co-stars performed the show's ending theme "Buon! Buon! Ride On!!" (ぶぉん! ぶぉん! らいど・おん!, Buon! Buon! Raido On!). She was also cast as Lily Shirogane in Aikatsu Stars!, Mira Yurisaki in Dimension W, Sophie Noelle in Kuromukuro, and Mallow in Pokémon: Sun & Moon. That same year, she made her debut as a singer, releasing the mini-album RefRain on December 21.

In 2017, Ueda played the roles of Hiromi Maiharu in Minami Kamakura High School Girls Cycling Club and Shiori Shinomiya in Sakura Quest. She also made an appearance at New Jersey's AnimeNEXT event in April.

In 2018, she played the roles of Arthur Pendragon in Märchen Mädchen and Akane Shinjō in SSSS.Gridman. She also released her first solo single "Sleepland" on February 7, 2018; the title track is used as the ending theme to Märchen Mädchen.

In 2019, she was cast as Miyako Hoshino in Wataten!: An Angel Flew Down to Me and Gray in The Case Files of Lord El-Melloi II: Rail Zeppelin Grace Note.

In 2020, she voiced Shuka Karino in Darwin's Game. She also released her second single "Literature" (リテラチュア) on October 21, 2020; the title track was used as the opening theme to the anime series Wandering Witch: The Journey of Elaina.

== Filmography ==
=== Anime television series ===
2012

- Inazuma Eleven: Chrono Stone
- Jormungand Perfect Order, Elena Baburin

2013

- Cardfight!! Vanguard: Link Joker Hen, Iwase, Maki Nagashiro
- Inazuma Eleven GO Galaxy, Katra Paige
- Infinite Stratos 2, Shizune Takatsuki
- Tesagure! Bukatsu-mono, Mobuko Sonota and other following sisters
- Tamagotchi! Miracle Friends, Claricetchi

2014

- Cardfight!! Vanguard: Legion Mate-Hen, Alice Carey
- Cross Ange: Rondo of Angel and Dragon, Tanya Zabirova
- Go-go Tamagotchi!, Lamertchi, Suzune
- Hanayamata, Naru Sekiya
- One Week Friends, Ōta
- Rail Wars!, Tomomi Ōito
- Terror in Resonance, Haruka Shibazaki
- Tesagure! Bukatsu-mono Encore, Mobuko Sonota
- Tokyo Ghoul, Jiro, Taguchi, Misato Gori
- When Supernatural Battles Became Commonplace, Naoe Hagiura

2015

- Aikatsu!, Yayoi Hanawa
- Anti-Magic Academy: The 35th Test Platoon, Ōka Ōtori
- Blood Blockade Battlefront, Neyka
- Hacka Doll the Animation, Hacka Doll #4
- Mikagura School Suite, Meika Katai
- My Monster Secret, Mikan Akemi
- PriPara, Ajimi Kiki
- Rolling Girls, Momo Fujiwara
- Tesagure! Bukatsu-mono: Spin-off Puru Purun Sharumu to Asobō, Mobuko Sonota
- Tokyo Ghoul √A, Jiro, Misato Gori, Shizuku Kawakami
- World Break: Aria of Curse for a Holy Swordsman, Elena Arshavina

2016

- Aikatsu Stars!, Lily Shirogane
- Bakuon!!, Hane Sakura
- Dimension W, Mira Yurisaki
- Kuromukuro, Sophie Noelle
- Pocket Monsters: Sun & Moon, Maō (Mallow)
- PriPara Ajimi Kiki, Jewlulu/Jewlie
- ReLIFE, An Onoya
- Scorching Ping Pong Girls, Kumami Tsukinowa

2017

- ID-0, Alice
- Idol Incidents, Sachie Kondō
- Idol Time PriPara Ajimi Kiki, Jululu/Jewlie & Mimiko Jigoku
- Land of the Lustrous, Hemimorphite
- Little Witch Academia, Jasminka Antonenko, Marjolaine (ep. 13)
- Minami Kamakura High School Girls Cycling Club, Hiromi Maiharu
- Recovery of an MMO Junkie, Lily
- Restaurant to Another World, Adelheid
- Sakura Quest, Shiori Shinomiya
- Wake Up, Girls! New Chapter, Rika Takashina

2018

- Caligula, μ
- Comic Girls, Suzu Fūra
- Goblin Slayer, Goblin Slayer's sister
- Ingress: The Animation, Sarah
- Kakuriyo: Bed and Breakfast for Spirits, Shizuna
- Märchen Mädchen, Arthur Pendragon
- My Hero Academia 3, Saiko Intelli (ep. 55)
- Real Girl, Sumie Ayado
- Record of Grancrest War, Aishela
- SSSS.Gridman, Akane Shinjō

2019

- Bakugan: Battle Planet, Phaedrus
- Chidori RSC, Misa Kuroi
- Demon Slayer: Kimetsu no Yaiba, Kanao Tsuyuri
- Dr. Stone, Ruri
- Fruits Basket, Kisa Soma
- Grimms Notes The Animation, Reina, Cinderella
- I'm From Japan, Komachi Yuze
- Kakegurui xx, Rumia Uru
- Real Girl 2nd Season, Sumie Ayado
- The Case Files of Lord El-Melloi II: Rail Zeppelin Grace Note, Gray
- Wasteful Days of High School Girls, Kohaku Kujyo
- Wataten!: An Angel Flew Down to Me, Miyako Hoshino

2020

- Adachi and Shimamura, Taeko Nagafuji
- Asteroid in Love, Moe Suzuya
- Bakugan: Armored Alliance, Phaedrus
- Darwin's Game, Shuka Karino
- Kaguya-sama: Love Is War?, Kyoko Ootomo
- Listeners, Janis
- The Millionaire Detective Balance: Unlimited, Mahoro Saeki
- Wandering Witch: The Journey of Elaina, Doll Shopkeeper

2021

- Back Arrow, Annie
- Backflip!!, Ayumi Futaba
- Blue Reflection Ray, Mio Hirahara
- Dr. Stone: Stone Wars, Ruri
- Hortensia Saga, Nonnoria Folley
- How a Realist Hero Rebuilt the Kingdom, Juna Doma
- Mushoku Tensei: Jobless Reincarnation, Ariel Anemoi Asura
- Night Head 2041, Yui Akiyama
- Pokémon Evolutions, Tamao
- Restaurant to Another World (season 2), Adelheid
- Takt Op. Destiny, Hell
- The Saint's Magic Power is Omnipotent, Elizabeth Ashley
- The Slime Diaries: That Time I Got Reincarnated as a Slime, Apito
- The World's Finest Assassin Gets Reincarnated in Another World as an Aristocrat, Dia Viekone
- Tsukimichi: Moonlit Fantasy, The Goddess

2022

- Aoashi, Anri Kaidō
- Bibliophile Princess, Elianna Bernstein
- Black Summoner, Melfina
- Bleach: Thousand-Year Blood War, Meninas McAllon
- Chainsaw Man, Reze
- Legend of Mana: The Teardrop Crystal, Florina
- Parallel World Pharmacy, Eléonore "Ellen" Bonnefoi
- Raven of the Inner Palace, Unkajō
- Smile of the Arsnotoria the Animation, Figuray
- Spy × Family, Sonia
- Tomodachi Game, Maria Mizuse
- World's End Harem, Shion Hoshino

2023

- A Playthrough of a Certain Dude's VRMMO Life, Fairy Queen
- Chibi Godzilla Raids Again, older Shobijin sister
- Dark Gathering, Daughter's Spirit (ep. 17)
- Malevolent Spirits: Mononogatari, Yu
- Mashle, Lemon Irvine
- Mushoku Tensei: Jobless Reincarnation 2, Ariel Anemoi Asura
- My Happy Marriage, Miyo Saimori
- Overtake!, Alice Mitsuzawa
- Ragna Crimson, Ultimatia
- Rokudo's Bad Girls, Raino, Kazeno, Amano
- Saint Cecilia and Pastor Lawrence, Frederica
- The Ancient Magus' Bride (season 2), Veronica Rickenbacker
- The Duke of Death and His Maid (season 2), Amelia
- The Vexations of a Shut-In Vampire Princess, Melca Tiano
- Too Cute Crisis, Komachi Kokage

2024

- Blue Box, Chinatsu Kano
- Chained Soldier, Sahara Wakasa
- Days with My Stepsister, Akiko Ayase
- Frieren, Methode
- Hokkaido Gals Are Super Adorable!, Rena Natsukawa
- Ishura, Yuno the Distant Talon
- KonoSuba 3, Rain
- Let This Grieving Soul Retire!, Sophia
- Mashle: The Divine Visionary Candidate Exam Arc, Lemon Irvine
- No Longer Allowed in Another World, Sacchan
- Solo Leveling, Cha Hae-in
- Suicide Squad Isekai, Fione
- The Café Terrace and Its Goddesses (season 2), Moemi Sōya
- The Dangers in My Heart (season 2), Yurine Hanzawa
- The Wrong Way to Use Healing Magic, Princess Celia
- Too Many Losing Heroines!, Chihaya Asagumo
- Whisper Me a Love Song, Momoka Satomiya
- Wonderful Pretty Cure!, Mayu Nekoyashiki / Cure Lilian
- Yakuza Fiancé: Raise wa Tanin ga Ii, Tsubaki Akashigata
- You Are Ms. Servant, Yuki/Xue

2025

- I'm the Evil Lord of an Intergalactic Empire!, Amagi
- Mono, Haruno Akiyama
- Night of the Living Cat, Kaoru
- Rascal Does Not Dream of Santa Claus, Miniskirt Santa
- Sword of the Demon Hunter: Kijin Gentōshō, Suzune
- This Monster Wants to Eat Me, Hinako Yaotose
- Wind Breaker Season 2, Shizuka Narita

2026

- A Misanthrope Teaches a Class for Demi-Humans, Neneko Kurosawa
- Black Torch, Hana Usami
- Mao, Yurako
- Petals of Reincarnation, F. Nightingale
- The Apothecary Diaries Season 3, Sotei / White Lady

2027

- Fate Rewinder, Lemon
- Skip and Loafer, Chieri Yasaka
- The Remarried Empress, Rashta

=== Anime films ===
- Harmonie (2014), Juri Makina
- Wake Up, Girls! Beyond the Bottom (2015), Rika Takashina
- Little Witch Academia: The Enchanted Parade (2015), Jasminka Antonenko
- Harmony (2015), Miach Mihie
- PriPara Minna no Akogare Let's Go PriPari (2016), Ajimi Kiki
- Godzilla: City on the Edge of Battle (2018), Maina
- Godzilla: The Planet Eater (2018), Maina
- Pretty Guardian Sailor Moon Eternal The Movie (2021), CereCere/Sailor Ceres
- Mobile Suit Gundam: Hathaway's Flash (2021), Gigi Andalusia
- Backflip!! (2022), Ayumi Futaba
- One Piece Film: Red (2022), Mini-Bepo
- Wataten!: An Angel Flew Down to Me: Precious Friends (2022), Miyako Hoshino
- Maboroshi (2023), Mutsumi Sagami
- Pretty Guardian Sailor Moon Cosmos The Movie (2023), Sailor Ceres
- My Next Life as a Villainess: All Routes Lead to Doom! The Movie (2023), Haati
- Trapezium (2024), Ranko Katori
- Code Geass: Rozé of the Recapture (2024), Sakuya Sumeragi, Sakura Haruyanagininomiya
- Wonderful Pretty Cure! The Movie: A Grand Adventure in a Thrilling Game World! (2024), Mayu Nekoyashiki / Cure Lillian
- Colorful Stage! The Movie: A Miku Who Can't Sing (2025), Honami Mochizuki
- Chainsaw Man – The Movie: Reze Arc (2025), Reze
- Demon Slayer: Kimetsu no Yaiba – The Movie: Infinity Castle (2025), Kanao Tsuyuri
- You and Idol Pretty Cure the Movie: For You! Our Kirakilala Concert! (2025), Mayu Nekoyashiki / Cure Lillian
- Whoever Steals This Book (2025), Natsume Harada
- Mobile Suit Gundam: Hathaway – The Sorcery of Nymph Circe (2026), Gigi Andalusia
- Rascal Does Not Dream of a Dear Friend (2026), Nene Iwamizawa
- The Keeper of the Camphor Tree (2026)
- Star Detective Precure! The Movie: The Mysterious Garden and a Secret Pair (2026), Mayu Nekoyashiki / Cure Lillian

=== Original net animations ===
- Null & Peta (2019), Peta
- Japan Sinks: 2020 (2020), Ayumu Mutō
- Takopi's Original Sin (2025), Shizuka Kuze
- Yu-Gi-Oh! Card Game The Chronicles (2026), Diabellze

=== Video games ===
- The Idolmaster Million Live! (2013), Umi Kōsaka
- Granblue Fantasy (2014), Pengy
- The Caligula Effect (2016), μ (Mu)
- Girls' Frontline (2016), Carcano M1891, Carcano M91/38
- Soulworker Online (2016), Lee Nabi
- Little Witch Academia: Chamber of Time (2017), Jasminka Antonenko
- Azur Lane (2017), Izumo, Émile Bertin, Gloucester, Akane Shinjō (appeared in 2021)
- SINoALICE (2017), Snow White
- Idolmaster Million Live! Theater Days (2017), Umi Kōsaka
- Magia Record (2017): Aimi Eri
- Kirby Star Allies (2018), Francisca
- Fate/Grand Order (2019), Gray
- Another Eden (2019), Ilulu
- Brigandine: The Legend of Runersia (2020), Eliza Uzala
- Touhou LostWord (2020), Kutaka Niwatari, Mayumi Joutouguu
- Neptunia Virtual Star (2020), Faira
- World's End Club (2020), Reycho
- Rockman X Dive (2020), RiCO, iCO
- Atelier Lydie & Suelle: The Alchemists and the Mysterious Paintings (2017), Lucia Borthayre
- Arknights (2019), Rosa
- Konosuba: Fantastic Days (2019), Rain
- League of Legends, Seraphine
- Digimon ReArise (2020), Bakumon
- Onmyoji (2020), Sasori
- Shin Megami Tensei III: Nocturne HD Remaster (2020), Chiaki Tachibana
- Re:Zero − Starting Life in Another World: Lost in Memories (2020), Shion
- Genshin Impact (2020), Ganyu
- Project Sekai: Colorful Stage feat. Hatsune Miku (2020), Honami Mochizuki
- Eden Door (2020), Ariel
- Alchemy Stars (2021), Angel
- The Legend of Heroes: Trails through Daybreak, Nina Fenly
- No More Heroes III (2021), Midori Midorikawa
- Blue Reflection: Second Light (2021), Mio Hirahara
- Paradigm Paradox (2021), Ritsu Mamiya
- Soul Tide (2021), Alisa
- Gate of Nightmares (2021), Luka
- Super Robot Wars 30 (2021), Akane Shinjo
- Demon Slayer: Kimetsu no Yaiba - The Hinokami Chronicles (2021), Kanao Tsuyuri
- Atelier Sophie 2: The Alchemist of the Mysterious Dream (2022), Elvira
- Counter: Side (2022), Mika ★ Star
- The Legend of Heroes: Trails Through Daybreak II (2022), Nina Fenly
- Goddess of Victory: Nikke (2022), Scarlet (紅蓮(ぐれん))
- Lackgirl I (2022), Sui
- Live A Live (2022), Lei Kugo
- Path to Nowhere (2022), Ariel
- Harvestella (2022), Emo
- Triangle Strategy (2022), Cordelia Glenbrook
- Fire Emblem Engage (2023), Veyle
- 404 Game Re:set (2023), Darius
- Towa Tsugai (2023), Tsuru
- Fuga: Melodies of Steel 2 (2023), Hanmna Fondant
- Hira Hira Hihiru (2023), Haruko Tsunemi
- Octopath Traveler II (2023), Mindt
- Eternights (2023), Min
- Reverse: 1999 (2023), Bkornblume
- Dragon Quest Monsters: The Dark Prince (2023), Rosalie
- Honkai: Star Rail (2023), Sparkle, Sparxie
- Reynatis (2024), Tsumugi
- Sword Art Online: Fractured Daydream (2024), Fuuka
- Like a Dragon: Pirate Yakuza in Hawaii (2025), Moana Rich
- Stellar Blade (2025), Scarlet (紅蓮(ぐれん))
- Nekopara: Sekai Connect (2026), Ak Dut

=== Dubbing ===
==== Live-action ====
- Dickinson (2019), Lavinia Norcross Dickinson
- No.1 Sentai Gozyuger (2025), Miss Sweetcake
- Odd Squad UK (2025), Agent Orli
- The Fantastic Four: First Steps (2025), Shalla-Bal / Silver Surfer

==== Animation ====
- Oni: Thunder God's Tale, Amaten
- Stillwater, Addy
- Toy Story 5
- Young Justice, Zatanna

==== Others ====
- The Summer You Were There (manga), Hoshikawa Shizuku (promotional videos)

== Discography ==
=== Singles ===
No.	Release date	Title	Identification number	Oricon chart position	Note(s)
1	February 7, 2018	sleepland	LACM-14724 (Artist Edition), LACM-14725 (Anime Edition)	24	sleepland: Märchen Mädchen ED Dare mo Watashi wo Shiranai Sekai e: Märchen Mädchen image song
2	October 21, 2020	Literature	LACM-24028 (Artist Edition), LACM-24029 (Anime Edition)	11	Literature: Wandering Witch: The Journey of Elaina OP

=== Albums ===
No.	Release date	Title	Identification number	Oricon chart position
1	March 18, 2020	Empathy	LACA-15809	12
2	August 18, 2021	Nebula	LACA-15884	14

=== Mini albums ===
No.	Release date	Title	Identification number	Oricon chart position
1	December 21, 2016	RefRain	LACA-15617	54
2	October 10, 2022	Atrium	LACA-15884	14

== Accolades ==
Year	Award	Category	Recipient	Result	Ref.
2015	9th Seiyu Awards	Best New Actress Award	Naru Sekiya (Hanayamata)	Won	
2019	3rd Crunchyroll Anime Awards	Best VA Performance (Japanese)	Akane Shinjo (SSSS.Gridman)	Nominated	
2021	15th Seiyu Awards	Best Supporting Actress Award	Shuka Karino (Darwin's Game)	Won	
2024	10th Anime Trending Awards	Best Voice Acting Performance – Female	Miyo Saimori (My Happy Marriage)	Won	
2026	20th Seiyu Awards	Best Supporting Actor Award	Herself	Won	
2026	10th Crunchyroll Anime Awards	Best VA Performance (Japanese)	Reze (Chainsaw Man – The Movie: Reze Arc)	Nominated	
