= You and Idol Pretty Cure the Movie: For You! Our Kirakilala Concert! =

2025 film by Kōji Ogawa

- Cover of the Blu-ray release by Marvelous!
- Japanese: 映画キミとアイドルプリキュア♪ お待たせ！キミに届けるキラッキライブ！
- Revised Hepburn: Eiga Kimi to Aidoru Purikyua♪ Omatase! Kimi ni Todokeru Kirakiraibu!
- Directed by: Kōji Ogawa
- Screenplay by: Hiroyuki Yoshino
- Based on: Pretty Cure by Izumi Todo
- Starring: Misato Matsuoka; Minami Takahashi; Natsumi Takamori; Yoshino Nanjō; Miharu Hanai; Maria Naganawa; Atsumi Tanezaki; Satsumi Matsuda; Reina Ueda; Akira Sekine; Ai Kakuma; Ayumu Murase; Ayaka Nanase; Aoi Koga; Junichi Suwabe; Daisuke Sakuma
- Cinematography: Yuki Oshima
- Music by: Erika Fukusawa; Misaki Umase
- Production company: Toei Animation
- Distributed by: Toei Company, Ltd.
- Release date: September 12, 2025
- Running time: 71 minutes
- Country: Japan
- Language: Japanese

You and Idol Pretty Cure the Movie: For You! Our Kirakilala Concert! (Note: Official name as You and Idol Precure the Movie: For You! Our Kirakilala Concert!) (Japanese: 映画キミとアイドルプリキュア♪ お待たせ！キミに届けるキラッキライブ！, Hepburn: Eiga Kimi to Aidoru Purikyua♪ Omatase! Kimi ni Todokeru Kiraki Raibu!) is a 2025 Japanese animated action fantasy film based on the Pretty Cure franchise created by Izumi Todo, and its twenty-second series, You and Idol Pretty Cure. The film is directed by Kōji Ogawa, written by Hiroyuki Yoshino and produced by Toei Animation. The film was released in Japan on September 12, 2025.

Featuring the Pretty Cure teams from Wonderful Pretty Cure! and Soaring Sky! Pretty Cure, the girls arrive on AiAi island to perform for the Super Miracle Idol Festival, while uncovering the secrets of the island.

== Plot ==
Uta and her friends are invited by coral fairy named Totto to an AiAi Island for the "Super Miracle Idol Festival". Suddenly, monsters appear and threaten the festival, and the girls are later mysteriously transported to the past. They then search for clues for their current situation assisted by an idol-hating girl named Tera, as well as the legend surrounding the island's goddess, Amas.

== Voice cast ==
- Misato Matsuoka as Uta Sakura / Cure Idol
  - Matsuoka also voices the Legendary Idol
- Minami Takahashi as Nana Aokaze / Cure Wink
- Natsumi Takamori as Kokoro Shigure / Cure Kyun-Kyun
- Yoshino Nanjō as Purirun / Cure Zukyoon
- Miharu Hanai as Meroron / Cure Kiss
- Junichi Suwabe as Tanakhan / Tanaka
- Maria Naganawa as Komugi Inukai / Cure Wonderful
- Atsumi Tanezaki as Iroha Inukai / Cure Friendy
- Satsumi Matsuda as Yuki Nekoyashiki / Cure Nyammy
- Reina Ueda as Mayu Nekoyashiki / Cure Lillian
- Akira Sekine as Sora Harewataru / Cure Sky
- Ai Kakuma as Mashiro Nijigaoka / Cure Prism
  - Kakuma also voices the gorilla from Safaria
- Ayumu Murase as Tsubasa Yuunagi / Cure Wing
- Ayaka Nanase as Ageha Hijiri / Cure Butterfly
- Aoi Koga as Ellee / Cure Majesty
- Maaya Uchida as Tera
- Ayane Sakura as Amasu
- Atsuhiro Tsuda as Totto
- Moeko Kanisawa as Animal Idol #1
- Momo Sakurai as Animal Idol #2
- Saya Tanizaki as Animal Idol #3
- Nagisa Shibuya as Zombie Idol

== Production ==
In January 2025, it was announced that You and Idol Pretty Cure anime series will receive a film for September release. In June of that year, the title of the film was announced, and will feature Pretty Cure teams from Wonderful Pretty Cure! and Soaring Sky! Pretty Cure. Kōji Ogawa, who previously directed Pretty Cure All Stars New Stage 2 and 3, as well as Soaring Sky! Pretty Cure series will direct the film at Toei Animation, with Hiroyuki Yoshino providing the screenplay, and Nishiki Itaoka from Pretty Cure Miracle Leap: A Strange Day With Everyone! and Pretty Cure All Stars F designing the characters and in charge of chief animation direction. In August, it was announced that Maaya Uchida and Ayane Sakura was cast as Tera and Amasu respectively, with Japanese comedian Atsuhiro Tsuda cast as Totto later that month. In September, it was revealed that three members of the J-pop girl group ≠ME voiced the Animal Idols, while Nagisa Shibuya voiced a Zombie Idol, while Misato Matsuoka, who also voices Cure Idol, voiced the Legendary Idol.

The opening song for the film is "You and Idol Pretty Cure Light Up! ReMix for You and Idol Precure" (キミとアイドルプリキュア♪ Light Up! ReMix for You and Idol Precure♪, Kimi to Aidoru Purikyua Raito Appu! ReMikkusu fō You ando Aidoru Purikyua), performed by Misato Matsuoka, Minami Takahashi, Natsumi Takamori, Yoshino Nanjō and Miharu Hanai (as Cure Idol, Cure Wink, Cure Kyun-Kyun, Cure Zukyoon and Cure Kiss), while the theme song is "Hibiki Au Uta", with the five voice actresses performing the ending version.

== Release ==
The film was released in theaters in Japan on September 12, 2025.
