= Mayuko =

- Gender: Female

Origin
- Origin: Japanese
- Meaning: Different meanings depending on the kanji used

Mayuko (written: 麻由子, 麻祐子, 麻友子, 万由子, 真由子 or 真悠子) is a feminine Japanese given name. Notable people with the name include:

- Mayuko Aoki (青木 麻由子; born 1975), Japanese actress and voice actress
- Mayuko Arisue (有末 麻祐子; born 1992), Japanese model, actress and entertainer
- Mayuko Fujiki (藤木 麻祐子; born 1975), Japanese synchronized swimmer and coach
- Mayuko Fukuda (福田 麻由子; born 1994), Japanese actress
- Mayuko Goto (born 1995), Japanese freestyle swimmer
- Mayuko Hagiwara (萩原 麻由子; born 1986), Japanese racing cyclist
- Mayuko Inoue (井上 真由子; born 1997), Japanese formel idol of idol group Super Girls
- Mayuko Irie (入江 麻友子; born 1962), Japanese actress and model
- Mayuko Ishitate (石立 真悠子; born 1987), Japanese handball player
- Mayuko Iwasa (岩佐 真悠子; born 1987), Japanese entertainer, model and actress
- Mayuko Kamio (神尾 真由子; born 1986), Japanese violinist
- Mayuko Kawakita (河北 麻友子; born 1991), Japanese-American actress
- Mayuko Kazama (風間 万裕子), Japanese voice actress
- Mayuko Kikuchi (菊池 真由子; born 1976), Japanese entertainment reporter
- Mayuko Kitayama (born 1984), Japanese backup dancer
- Mayuko Takata (高田 万由子), Japanese actress
- Mayuko Toyota (豊田 真由子; born 1974), Japanese politician
- Mayuko Wakuda (和久田 麻由子; born 1988), Japanese announcer and news anchor
- Mayuko Watanabe (渡辺 真由子; born 1975), Japanese journalist and media scholar
- Mayuko Yamashita (山下 真由子; born 1995), Japanese mathematician and mathematical physicist

== Fictional characters ==
- Mayuko Kiyokawa, a character from Soar High! Isami
- Mayuko Inoue (井上 真由子), a character from Ushio and Tora
