= Atsumi Tanezaki =

Japanese voice actress (born 1990)

- 種﨑 敦美
- Born: September 27, 1990 (age 36); Ōita Prefecture, Japan
- Occupation: Voice actress
- Years active: 2012–present
- Agent: Tokyo Actor's Consumer's Cooperative Society
- Notable work: Terror in Resonance as Lisa Mishima; Subete ga F ni Naru as Moe Nishinosono; The Ancient Magus' Bride as Chise Hatori; Dragon Quest: The Adventure of Dai as Dai; Vivy: Fluorite Eye's Song as Vivy; JoJo's Bizarre Adventure: Stone Ocean as Emporio Alniño; Spy × Family as Anya Forger; Frieren: Beyond Journey's End as Frieren; Wonderful Pretty Cure! as Iroha Inukai / Cure Friendy
- Spouse: Yu Miyazaki (m. 2023)

Atsumi Tanezaki (種﨑 敦美, Tanezaki Atsumi; born September 27, 1990) is a Japanese voice actress formerly affiliated with Toritori Office. She is represented by Tokyo Actor's Consumer's Cooperative Society. She is best known for voicing Anya Forger in Spy × Family and the titular character of Frieren: Beyond Journey's End.

== Biography ==
In an interview with Repotama!, Tanezaki revealed she watched Sailor Moon. She explained that her job was impactful and she became an actress. She had part-time jobs after attending high school in Ōita Prefecture. In an interview, she stated that her favorite voice actresses are Miyuki Sawashiro and Mayumi Tanaka. Tanezaki attended the concert and had the opportunity from Junko Iwao. Upon expressing her desire about a fan event, Iwao responded stating that she would work with her.

In 2020, Tanezaki won the Best Supporting Actress Award at the 14th Seiyu Awards. In 2023, she was a recipient of the Best Supporting Actor Award and Best Lead Actor Award at the 17th Seiyu Awards.

On October 2, 2023, it was announced that Tanezaki had married voice actor Yu Miyazaki.

On July 1, 2025, it was announced by her agency, the Tokyo Actor's Consumer's Cooperative Society, that she would limit activity due to poor health.

== Filmography ==
=== Anime series ===
2012

- My Little Monster as Asako Natsume

2013

- Da Capo III as Jill Hathaway
- Day Break Illusion as Itsuki Tendo, Mutsumi Tendo, Nanase Tendo
- Silver Spoon as Minami Kitamachi, announcer

2014

- A Good Librarian Like a Good Shepherd as Nagi Kodachi
- Hozuki's Coolheadedness as Karashi
- In Search of the Lost Future as Yaeko Azuma
- Magic Kaito 1412 as Keiko Momoi
- Terror in Resonance as Lisa Mishima
- Tribe Cool Crew as Ayumu Itou
- World Conquest Zvezda Plot as schoolgirl B, Shabadaba commander
- Wolf Girl and Black Prince as Miho

2015

- Death Parade as Mayu Arita
- Durarara!! x2 Shou as Emilia, Yuigadokusonmaru
- Gangsta. as Mikhail
- Monster Musume as Lilith
- Seraph of the End as Sayuri Hanayori
- The Perfect Insider as Moe Nishinosono

2016

- Mysterious Joker 3rd Season as Hosshii
- High School Fleet as Mei Irizaki
- Mob Psycho 100 as Tome Kurata
- Nameko: Sekai no Tomodachi as Love Nameko
- Servamp as Otogiri
- Keijo as Ayase Kurogiri
- Sound! Euphonium 2 as Mizore Yoroizuka

2017

- A Centaur's Life as Chigusa Mitama, Chinami Mitama, Chiho Mitama
- Blend S as Miu Amano
- Land of the Lustrous as Neptunite
- Nora, Princess, and Stray Cat as Yuuki Asuhara
- The Ancient Magus' Bride as Chise Hatori

2018

- Double Decker! Doug & Kirill as Yuri Fujishiro/"Robot"
- Gakuen Babysitters as Kazuma Mamizuka
- Ninja Girl & Samurai Master 3rd Season as Chiyome Mochizuki
- How Not to Summon a Demon Lord as Klem
- Harukana Receive as Claire Thomas
- Rascal Does Not Dream of Bunny Girl Senpai as Rio Futaba

2019

- Bakugan: Battle Planet as Veronica Venegas
- Beastars as Juno
- Circlet Princess as Chikage Fujimura
- Endro! as Female Knight
- Fairy Gone as Lily Heineman
- Fruits Basket as Arisa Uotani
- Granbelm as Shingetsu Ernesta Fukami
- Kandagawa Jet Girls as Minato Tsuruno
- Kono Oto Tomare! Sounds of Life as Satowa Hōzuki
- Val × Love as Skuld
- W'z as Hana

2020

- A Certain Scientific Railgun T as Ryouko Kuriba, and Doppelganger
- Bakugan: Armored Alliance as Veronica Venegas
- Dragon Quest: The Adventure of Dai as Dai
- Fire Force as Woman in Black
- Fruits Basket 2nd Season as Arisa Uotani
- Monster Girl Doctor as Skadi Dragenfelt
- Shadowverse as Kai Ijūin

2021

- Beastars Season 2 as Juno
- Demon Slayer: Kimetsu no Yaiba – Entertainment District Arc as Hinatsuru
- Dr. Stone: Stone Wars as Nikki Hanada
- Horimiya as Miki Yoshikawa
- Joran: The Princess of Snow and Blood as Rinko Takemichi
- That Time I Got Reincarnated as a Slime 2nd Season as Mjurran
- The Honor Student at Magic High School as Shiori Kanō
- The Promised Neverland Season 2 as Mujika
- Vivy: Fluorite Eye's Song as Vivy

2022

- Arknights: Prelude to Dawn as Dobermann
- Beast Tamer as Leanne
- Mob Psycho 100 III as Tome Kurata
- My Dress-Up Darling as Sajuna Inui
- Nights with a Cat as Pi-chan
- Princess Connect! Re:Dive Season 2 as Chloe
- Shin Ikki Tousen as Asaemon Yamada
- Shine Post as Eiko Kikuchi
- Spy × Family as Anya Forger

2023

- Am I Actually the Strongest? as Charlotte Zenfis
- Bosanimal as Ran
- Dead Mount Death Play as Lisa Kuraki
- Frieren: Beyond Journey's End as Frieren
- Heavenly Delusion as Aoshima
- I'm Giving the Disgraced Noble Lady I Rescued a Crash Course in Naughtiness as Lü
- Me & Roboco as Chizuru Mifune
- My Clueless First Friend as Yukiko Takada
- My Hero Academia Season 6 as Kaina Tsutsumi / Lady Nagant
- Nier: Automata Ver1.1a as Lily
- The Ancient Magus' Bride 2nd Season as Chise Hatori
- The Apothecary Diaries as Gyokuyō
- The Dangers in My Heart as Serina Yoshida
- The Iceblade Sorcerer Shall Rule the World as Lydia Ainsworth
- Tomo-chan Is a Girl! as Ogawa
- Under Ninja as Suzuki
- Yomawari Neko as Jūrō
- Detective Conan: Black Iron Submarine as Naomi Argento

2024

- Days with My Stepsister as Kaho Fujinami
- My Hero Academia Season 7 as Kaina Tsutsumi / Lady Nagant
- The Seven Deadly Sins: Four Knights of the Apocalypse as Isolde
- Too Many Losing Heroines! as Koto Tsukinoki
- Unnamed Memory as Tinasha
- Welcome Home as Hikari Fujiyoshi
- Wonderful Pretty Cure! as Iroha Inukai / Cure Friendy

2025

- 9-Nine: Ruler's Crown as Sora Niimi
- Dekin no Mogura as Kyōko Nekozuku
- Farmagia as Lookie-Loo
- Mashin Creator Wataru as Kakeru Amabe / Uzume
- My Hero Academia: Final Season as Kaina Tsutsumi / Lady Nagant
- Night of the Living Cat as Suō
- Once Upon a Witch's Death as Mysterious Girl
- Orb: On the Movements of the Earth as Albert Brudzewski (young)
- Secrets of the Silent Witch as Isabel Norton
- Yano-kun's Ordinary Days as Mei

2026

- Draw This, Then Die! as Nana Teramura
- Gals Can't Be Kind to Otaku!? as Kakeru Ijichi
- High School! Kimengumi as Doremi Hasorashi
- Kill Blue as Chisato Shiraishi
- The Darwin Incident as Charlie

2027

- Kindergarten Wars as Rita

=== Original video animation ===
2013

- Kamisama Kiss as Tanuko
- My Little Monster as Asako Natsume

2016

- The Ancient Magus' Bride: Those Awaiting a Star as Chise Hatori

2018

- Thus Spoke Kishibe Rohan as Naoko Osato (ep. 2)

2021

- The Ancient Magus' Bride: The Boy From the West and the Knight of the Mountain Haze as Chise Hatori
- Alice Gear Aegis: Heart Pounding! Actress Packed Mermaid Grand Prix! as Sugumi Kanagata

2022

- Dr. Stone: Ryusui as Nikki Hanada
- Moriarty the Patriot as Luke

=== Original net animation ===
- Hana no Zundamaru (2013)
- Dohiwai Senior Protection Club (2014) as Marie
- Chuuko Video-ya no Onna Tenin X (2016) as Inari
- Great Pretender (2020) as Tom
- JoJo's Bizarre Adventure: Stone Ocean (2021–22) as Emporio Alniño
- Pokémon Evolutions (2021) as Malva
- The Missing 8 (2021) as Maesarc
- Exception (2022) as Patty
- Rising Impact (2024) as Kurumi Noshino
- Time Patrol Bon (2024) as Ream Stream
- Terminator Zero (2024) as Kokoro
- Love Through a Prism (2026) as Lili Ichijoin

=== Anime films ===
- Persona 3 The Movie: No. 1, Spring of Birth (2013) as Natsuki Moriyama
- Sound! Euphonium: The Movie – Welcome to the Kitauji High School Concert Band (2016) as Brass band member
- Pop in Q (2016) as Konatsu Tomodate
- Fireworks (2017) as Reporter
- Servamp -Alice in the Garden- (2018) as Otogiri
- Liz and the Blue Bird (2018) as Mizore Yoroizuka
- Yo-kai Watch: Forever Friends (2018) as Jack Cobbler
- Grisaia: Phantom Trigger the Animation (2019) as Murasaki
- Rascal Does Not Dream of a Dreaming Girl (2019) as Rio Futaba
- Her Blue Sky (2019) as Chika Ōtaki
- High School Fleet: The Movie (2020) as Mei Irizaki
- Mobile Suit Gundam: Hathaway's Flash (2021) as Mace Flower
- Rascal Does Not Dream of a Sister Venturing Out (2023) as Rio Futaba
- Detective Conan: Black Iron Submarine (2023) as Naomi Argento
- Pretty Cure All Stars F (2023) as Puka / Cure Puka
- Birth of Kitarō: The Mystery of GeGeGe (2023) as Sayo Ryūga
- Rascal Does Not Dream of a Knapsack Kid (2023) as Rio Futaba
- Spy × Family Code: White (2023) as Anya Forger
- Dead Dead Demon's Dededede Destruction (2024) as Kiho Kurihara
- Mobile Suit Gundam: Silver Phantom (2024) as Female Protagonist
- Wonderful Pretty Cure! The Movie: A Grand Adventure in a Thrilling Game World! (2024) as Iroha Inukai / Cure Friendy
- Make a Girl (2025) as Number 0
- Doraemon: Nobita's Art World Tales (2025) as Milo
- Mononoke the Movie: The Ashes of Rage (2025) as Sachiko
- 100 Meters (2025) as Togashi (young)
- You and Idol Pretty Cure the Movie: For You! Our Kirakilala Concert! (2025) as Iroha Inukai / Cure Friendy
- Rascal Does Not Dream of a Dear Friend (2026) as Rio Futaba
- Mobile Suit Gundam: Hathaway – The Sorcery of Nymph Circe (2026) as Mace Flower
- Ghost (2027) as Masu's son

=== Video games ===
She is also known by her alias Kiritani Hana (桐谷華) or Sawasawa Sawa (沢澤砂羽).

- The Idolmaster Cinderella Girls (2016) as Kyoko Igarashi
- Labyrinth of Refrain: Coven of Dusk (2016) as Luca
- Fate/Grand Order (2017) as Ophelia Phamrsolone
- Overwatch (2017) as Orisa
- Alice Gear Aegis (2018) as Sugumi Kanagata
- Kirara Fantasia (2018) as Miu Amano
- Azur Lane (2019) as Albacore, Zara, Pola, Jeanne d'Arc
- 13 Sentinels: Aegis Rim (2019) as Iori Fuyusaka, Chihiro Morimura
- Princess Connect! Re:Dive (2019) as Hanako Kuroe/Chloe
- Arknights (2020) as Blue Poison, Dobermann
- Granblue Fantasy (2020) as Vikala, Kai Ijūin
- Star Ocean: The Divine Force (2022) as Elena
- Witch on the Holy Night (2022) as Lugh Beowulf
- Goddess of Victory: Nikke (2023) as Sin
- Zenless Zone Zero (2024) as Anby Demara
- Blue Archive (2025) as Seia Yurizono
- Nekopara: Sekai Connect (2026) as Casablanca
- Arknights: Endfield (2026) as Si

Unknown date

- Da Capo III as Jill Hathaway, Yoshiyuki Sakurai (child)
- Himawari -Pebble in The Sky-
- Ren'ai 0 Kilometer Portable as Yura Yazaki
- School of Talent: SUZU-ROUTE as Haru Kato
- Tayutama: Kiss on my Deity
- Fire Emblem Heroes as Faye, Larcei
- Fire Emblem Echoes: Shadows of Valentia as Faye (Efie)
- Hoshi Ori Yume Mirai as Ousaka Sora
- Tsujidou-san no Jun'ai Road as Tanaka Hanako
- Maitetsu as Hachiroku
- Xenoblade Chronicles 2 as Agate
- Nora to Oujo to Noraneko Heart as Asuhara Yuuki
- Alphadia Series as Enah
- Alphadia Genesis Series as Enah/Elize
- Nora, Princess, and Stray Cat as Yuki Asuhara
- Sdorica as Karen Arla Fernandez
- Pokemon Masters as Dana
- Yuki Yuna is a Hero: Hanayui no Kirameki as Suzume Kagajou
- Sabbat of the Witch as Ayachi Nene
- Senren Banka as Liechtenauer Lena
- Riddle Joker as Mitsukasa Ayase
- 9-Nine- Series as Niimi Sora
- Girls' Frontline as Webley, KAC-PDW
- Magia Record as Sae Kirino
- Valkyrie Connect as Divine Creator Kamimusubi
- Maglam Lord as Satyus
- Alchemy Stars as Beryl
- Dusk Diver 2 as Le Viada
- Final Fantasy XIV: Endwalker as Meteion
- Counter:Side as Karin Wong
- Xenoblade Chronicles 3 as Ethel
- Gate of Nightmares as Meruru
- Cookie Run: Kingdom as Black Pearl Cookie
- 404 Game Re:set as Kiki Kaikai
- Master Detective Archives: Rain Code as Makoto Kagutsuchi
- Clover Day's as Takakura Anzu

=== Television drama ===
- Dear Radiance (2024), cockatoo voice

=== Dubbing ===
==== Live-action ====
- The Dog Stars as Cima (Margaret Qualley)
- Everything Everywhere All at Once as Joy Wang / Jobu Tupaki (Stephanie Hsu)
- The Fall Guy as Alma Milan (Stephanie Hsu)
- Hawkeye as Kate Bishop (Hailee Steinfeld)
- Heart of Stone as Yang (Jing Lusi)
- The Last Summoner as Dora
- Missing as June Allen (Storm Reid)
- Noelle as Noelle Kringle (Anna Kendrick)
- Rambo: Last Blood (2022 BS Tokyo edition) as Gabriela Beltran (Yvette Monreal)
- Superman as Lois Lane (Rachel Brosnahan)
- Trauma as Gabriel Pickering (Cory Garvin)

==== Animation ====
- The Cat in the Hat as Gabby
- Marvel Zombies as Kate Bishop
- PAW Patrol: The Mighty Movie as Nano
- The Wild Robot as Vontra

=== Others ===
- Zephyr as Kal's sister (event anime)
- Mahou Shoujo Ikusei Keikaku Dreamland as Snow White (Drama CD)
- Hanikami, Kanojo wa Koi o Suru ～ Hana Mihen as Neru Shiduki (Drama CD)
- I'll Become a Villainess Who Goes Down in History as Alicia (Drama CD)

== Awards ==
Year	Award ceremony	Award	Nomination(s)	Result	Ref.
2020	14th Seiyu Awards	Best Supporting Actress	Herself	Won	
2023	17th Seiyu Awards	Best Supporting Actor Award	Herself	Won	
2023	17th Seiyu Awards	Best Lead Actor	Herself	Won	
2023	7th Crunchyroll Anime Awards	Best VA Performance (Japanese)	Herself	Nominated	
2024	8th Crunchyroll Anime Awards	Best VA Performance (Japanese)	Herself	Nominated	
2024	46th Anime Grand Prix	Most Popular Voice Actor of the Year	Herself	Won	
2025	9th Crunchyroll Anime Awards	Best VA Performance (Japanese)	Herself	Nominated	
