= Senren Banka =

Japanese visual novel

- Original cover for the visual novel

千恋＊万花
- Video game
- Developer: Yuzusoft
- Publisher: JP: Yuzusoft; WW: NekoNyan, Hikari Field
- Genre: Eroge, Visual novel
- Platform: Windows, Nintendo Switch
- Released: Windows: JP: July 29, 2016; WW: February 14, 2020; Nintendo Switch: WW: May 26, 2022
- Manga
- Written by: Yuzusoft
- Illustrated by: Erika Kiduki
- Published by: Media Factory
- Imprint: MF Comics Alive Series
- Magazine: Monthly Comic Alive
- Original run: April 27, 2016 – February 27, 2017
- Volumes: 2
- Anime television series
- Original run: 2027 – scheduled

Senren Banka (Note: Japanese: 千恋＊万花; lit. 'A Thousand Love, Ten Thousand Flowers') is a Japanese adult visual novel developed by Yuzusoft. It was originally released for Microsoft Windows in July 2016. An all-ages version was released on Steam in February 2020, while a Nintendo Switch release followed in May 2022. A manga adaptation illustrated by Erika Kiduki was serialized in Media Factory's Monthly Comic Alive magazine from April 2016 to February 2017, with its chapters compiled into two volumes. An anime television series adaptation is set to premiere in 2027.

== Plot ==
Masaomi Arichi, a second-year high school student living in a rural Japanese town, comes across a sword stuck in a rock at the local shrine. Trying to pull it out, he ends up breaking it in half. This awakens Murasame, a spirit who had been residing in the sword. In addition, Masaomi breaking the sword angers the shrine, with him told that, to make amends, he must marry Yoshino Tomotake, the shrine maiden.

== Characters ==
Masaomi Arichi (有地 将臣, Arichi Masaomi)
The protagonist, he is a second-year high school student. He is skilled in kendo, having been trained by his grandfather.
Yoshino Tomotake (朝武 芳乃, Tomotake Yoshino)
Voiced by: Sora Haruka
The local shrine maiden and Masaomi's classmate. She has the ability to sprout ears whenever gods get angry; however, this can only be seen by some people.
Mako Hitachi (常陸 茉子, Hitachi Mako)
Voiced by: Yūka Kotorii
Yoshino's childhood friend and classmate. She is a ninja.
Murasame (ムラサメ)
Voiced by: Mikan Satō
A 500-year-old spirit who had been trapped inside a sword until she was freed when Masaomi broke it. As she is a spirit, only a few people can actually see her. In her previous life, she had been a sickly girl who was then sacrificed.
Lena Liechtenauer (レナ・リヒテナウアー, Rena Rihitenauā)
Voiced by: Sawa Sawasawa
A foreign student who had come to work at Masaomi's grandfather's inn. She is one of the few people who can see either Murasame or Yoshino's ears.

== Development and release ==
Senren Banka is Yuzusoft's ninth game and was released to mark the company's tenth anniversary. It is directed by Famishin, and features a scenario written by Ritsu Amamiya and Jun Seo, with Touta writing Lena's route. It features artwork by Kobuchi, Muririn, and Senji, with Haruka Komowata designing the game's chibi artwork.

The game was released on July 29, 2016 for Microsoft Windows. The game is licensed by NekoNyan, which released an all-ages version on Steam on February 14, 2020. The game was released for the Nintendo Switch on May 26, 2022.

== Adaptations ==
=== Manga ===
A manga adaptation illustrated by Erika Kiduki was serialized in Media Factory's Monthly Comic Alive magazine from April 27, 2016, to February 27, 2017. Two tankōbon volumes were released between September 23, 2016, and March 23, 2017.

No.	Release date	ISBN
1	September 23, 2016	978-4-04-068508-3
2	March 23, 2017	978-4-04-068590-8

=== Anime ===
An anime television series adaptation was announced at the "Yuzusoft SongFes 2026" event on July 26, 2026. The series will be produced under WWWave Corporation's Deregula anime label. The cast from the original visual novel are reprising their roles. It is set to premiere in 2027. The opening theme song will be performed by Kotoko.

== Music ==
External videos
- Opening movie on YouTube

The game features one opening theme and five ending themes. The game's opening theme is "Koi Kou Enishi" by Kotoko. Each character's route has its own ending theme: "Futatsu no Kage" by Mayuki Harukaze is used in Murasame's route, "Love flower" by Hazuki is used in Koharu's route, "Futari de" by Riryka is used in Mako's route, "Itoshisa to Kansha no Kimochi" by Yui Sakakibara is used in Yoshino's route, and "Kimi no Tonari" by Tohko is used in Roka's route.

== Reception ==
It was reported in February 2026 that the game had sold over one million copies, with Automaton Media noting that the game was particularly popular in China.
