= Mayuko Kikuchi =

Japanese entertainment reporter (born 1976)

- 菊池 真由子
- Born: 12 July 1976 (age 50); Tokyo, Japan
- Citizenship: Japan
- Education: Tokyo Announcement Academy
- Occupations: Entertainment reporter; gourmet reporter
- Years active: 2001–
- Agent: Kozo Creators
- Television: Asanama Wide Ce Matin!; AsaPara!; Catch!; Kyō-kan TV
- Height: 166 cm (5 ft 5 in)
- Website: Mayuko Kikuchi - Kozo Creators

Mayuko KIkuchi (菊池 真由子, Kikuchi Mayuko; born 12 July 1976) is a Japanese entertainment reporter.

== Biography ==
She was from Tokyo. After graduating from Tokyo Announcement Academy, she became a reporter for gourmet programmes and travel programmes broadcast on cable television. After that, she made her wide-show reporting debut at Nippon TV's Let's!

== Appearing programmes ==
=== Current ===
Title	Network	Notes	Ref.
Asanama Wide Ce Matin!	YTV		
AsaPara!	YTV		
Catch!	CTV		
Kyō-kan TV	RKB		
High Noon TV Viking!	CX	Monday entertainment commentator	

=== Former ===
Title	Network	Ref.
Let's!	NTV	
The! Jōhō Tsū	NTV	
Sukkiri!!	NTV	
Zoom In!! Super	CTV	
Oha Zip!	CTV	

=== Internet ===
Title	Publisher	Ref.
Kozo Inoue Geinō	NTT DoCoMo, SoftBank, au	

=== Mobile websites ===
Title	Ref.
Geinō Maru Hi Channel	
