= ABC Animation =

Japanese animation company

ABC Animation, Inc.
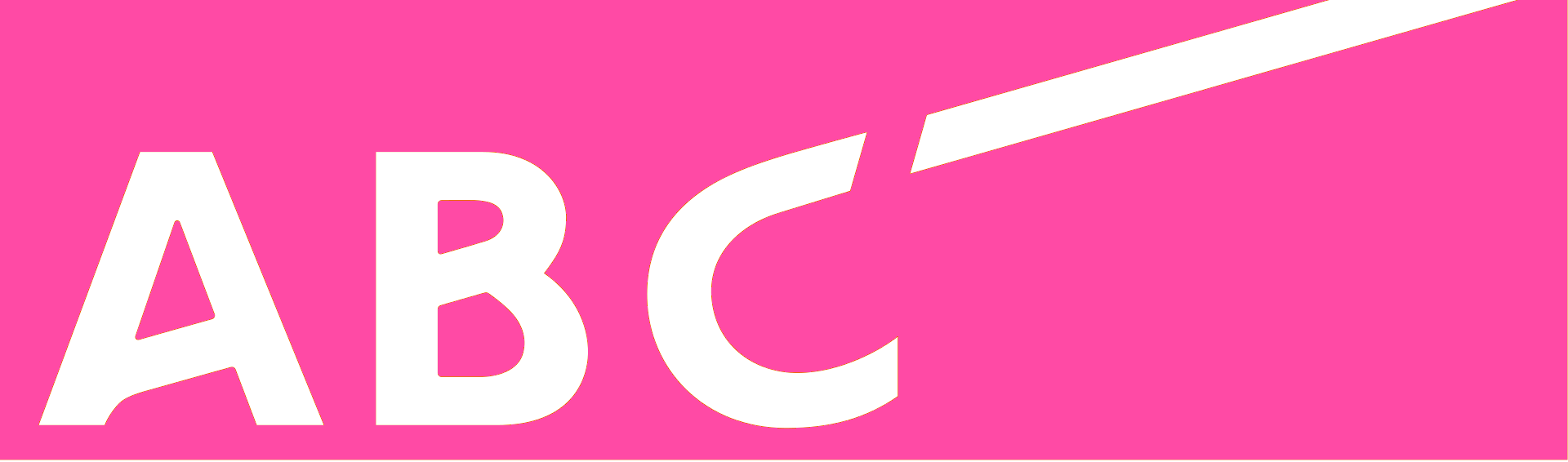
- Native name: 株式会社ABCアニメーション
- Romanized name: Kabushiki-gaisha ABC Animēshon
- Type: Subsidiary
- Industry: Anime
- Founded: 5 April 2016; 10 years ago
- Headquarters: Shinjuku Ni-chōme, Shinjuku, Tokyo, Japan
- Key people: Masayuki Nishide (chairman)
- Owner: Asahi Broadcasting Group Holdings
- Divisions: ABC Animation Studio
- Subsidiaries: Silver Link; Zero G Act; ABC Optapilor Studio; Toydium
- Website: abc-anime.co.jp

ABC Animation, Inc. (Note: Japanese: 株式会社ABCアニメーション, Hepburn: Kabushiki-gaisha ABC Animēshon) is a Japanese animation planning and production company that serves as a subsidiary of the Asahi Broadcasting Group Holdings Corporation. Based in Shinjuku, Tokyo, the company was formed as part of a spin-off of ABC's animation co-production business into a separate company, as part of a major restructuring of ABC's content production division. ABC Animation also owns animation studio Silver Link as well as other companies such as Zero G Act and CGCG Studio.

== History ==
ABC announced its plans to establish ABC Animation on March 4, 2016. Masayuki Nishide, a producer for ABC's animation productions as well as managing the company's content business division is appointed as its first president on May 10 of that year. The company inherited ABC Television's animation planning and production business two months later and became a subsidiary of ABC Frontier Holdings. In 2020, they established ABC Animation Studio with the debut project being the 2025 announced hollywood co-production animated film Death Stranding Mosquito (Working title). On April 1, 2021, the company became a wholly owned subsidiary of ABC Group Holdings. On October 1, 2023, Silver Link and Zero G Act became subsidiaries of the company and as a result, ABC Animation became the core company of the group's animation business. On October 26, 2023, ABC-A announced its intention to buy CGCG Studio; the sale was completed on December of that year. On August 8, 2024, Toysium became a subsidiary of the company.

== Production and distribution filmography ==
- Ascendance of a Bookworm
- BOFURI: I Don't Want to Get Hurt, so I'll Max Out My Defense.
- City the Animation
- The Great Jahy Will Not Be Defeated!
- Lycoris Recoil
- Miss Kobayashi's Dragon Maid
- Pretty Cure
- Rascal Does Not Dream
  - Rascal Does Not Dream of Bunny Girl Senpai
  - Rascal Does Not Dream of a Dreaming Girl
- Violet Evergarden
- Wise Man's Grandchild

== ABC Animation Studio (established in 2020) ==
Film

Year	Title	Notes
TBA	Death Stranding Mosquito (Working Title)	
