= Marika Kōno =

Japanese voice actress

Marika Kohno
- 高野 麻里佳
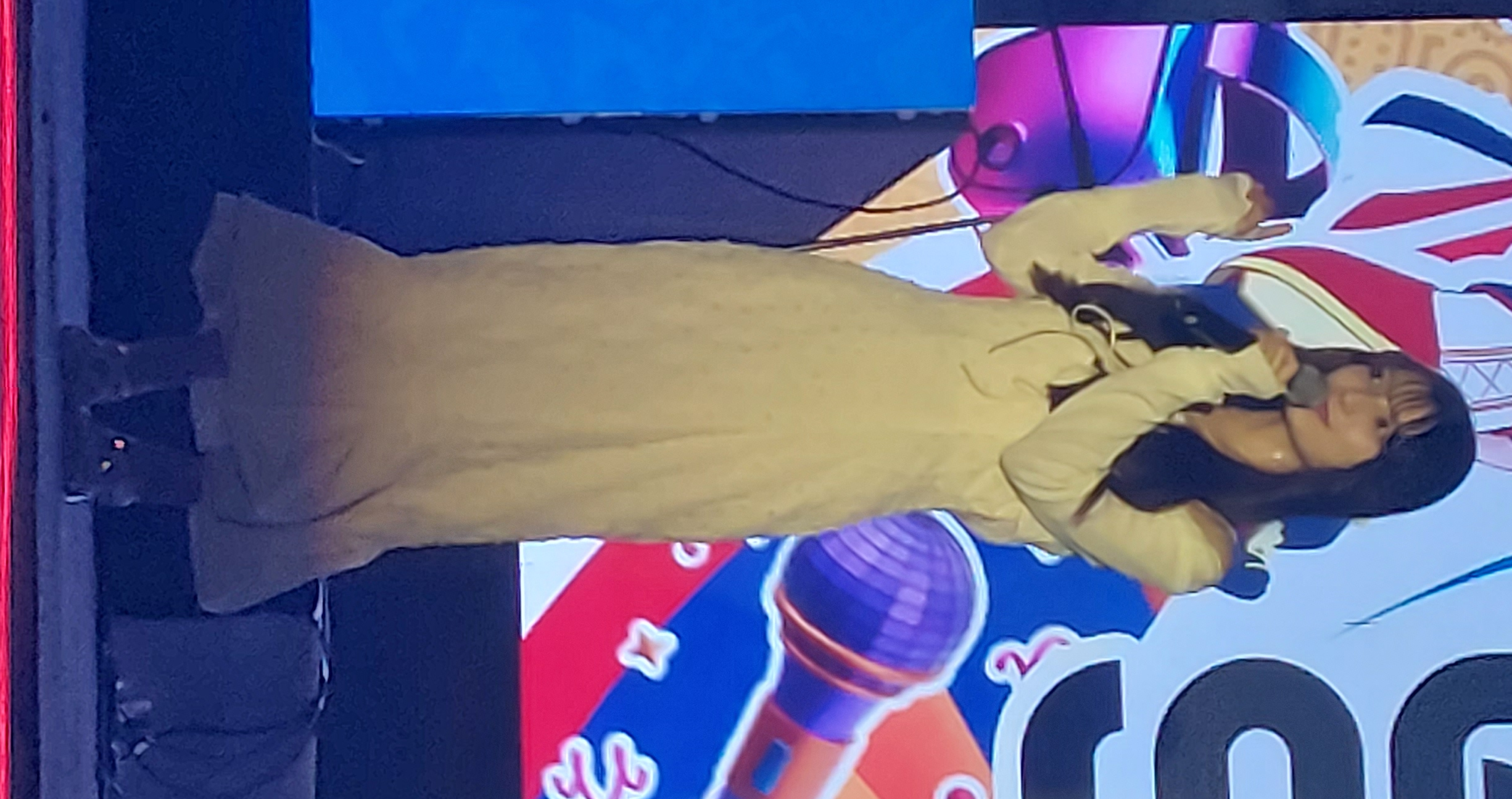
- Kohno at Philippine Game Show 2025
- Born: February 22, 1994 (age 32); Tokyo, Japan
- Occupations: Voice actress; singer
- Years active: 2013–present
- Agent: Aoni Production
- Musical career
- Genre: J-Pop
- Instrument: Vocals
- Years active: 2020–present
- Label: Nippon Columbia
- Website: columbia.jp/kohnomarika/

Marika Kohno (高野 麻里佳, Kōno Marika; born February 22, 1994) is a Japanese voice actress and singer from Tokyo. She was affiliated with the agency Mausu Promotion before becoming affiliated with Aoni Production. Debuting as a voice actress in 2013, her first main role was in the 2015 anime television series Seiyu's Life! as Rin Kohana. She and the other main cast members of Seiyu's Life! are also members of the music group Earphones. She is known for her roles as Yua Nakajima in Hinako Note, Mahiro Oyama in Onimai, Amau Ako in Blue Archive, and Silence Suzuka in Umamusume: Pretty Derby.

== Biography ==
Kohno was born in Tokyo on February 22, 1994. She is the second of three sisters; her older sister Rina is a dancer. As a child, she was already fond of reading aloud during elementary school classes. She first became interested in voice acting from watching anime series. After learning that the characters Pikachu from Pokémon and Chopper from One Piece were voiced by the same person, Ikue Ōtani, Kouno began to aspire to pursuing a career in voice acting.

Upon entering high school, Kohno joined her school's voice acting club, where she studied the performances of voice actors. She also participated in other activities such as playing basketball. After her graduation, she enrolled in a training school operated by the Yoyogi Animation Academy. She completed her studies in 2014, and became affiliated with the Mausu Promotion agency the same year.

Kohno began her career playing minor roles in anime series such as Aikatsu!, Log Horizon, and Rail Wars!. She then played the roles of Utako Uta and Pakuko in Chikasugi Idol Akae-chan, which was also the first time she performed a song in an anime. The following year, she was cast in her first main role as Rin Kohana in the anime series Seiyu's Life!. She, together with her Seiyu's Life co-stars Rie Takahashi and Yuki Nagaku, formed the music group Earphones. She also became a member of the idol group Team Ohenro.

In 2017, Kohno played the roles of Yua Nakajima in Hinako Note, and Yumina Urnea Belfast in In Another World With My Smartphone. She was also announced to be voicing the character Silence Suzuka in the multimedia franchise Umamusume: Pretty Derby. In 2018, she played the role of Sat-chan in Mitsuboshi Colors, and she reprised the role of Silence Suzuka for the anime series of Umamusume: Pretty Derby.

On October 1, 2020, she transferred to Aoni Production.

On February 24, 2020, Kohno made her solo singer debut under Nippon Columbia with the release of her first single, "Yume Mitai, demo Yume janai" (夢みたい、でも夢じゃない). Her song "New story" was used as the opening theme to the anime series Seirei Gensouki: Spirit Chronicles in 2021, while her song "Love & Moon" was used as the ending theme to the anime series Beast Tamer.

On November 1, 2022, it was announced on Kohno's Twitter page that she had been diagnosed with adjustment disorder in mid-October 2022. Due to this, her scheduled activities were limited per advice from her agency, Aoni Production, in order to prioritize her current treatment.

In 2026, she played the role of Hiyori Hiwamura in Yowayowa Sensei.

== Filmography ==
=== TV anime ===
Year	Title	Role	Other notes	Ref.
2014	Aikatsu!	Girl	(Season 2) Ep 93	
2014	Chikasugi Idol Akae-chan	Utako Uta; Pakuko		
2014	Log Horizon 2	Shimai Momoiro; Kurinon	Ep 7 Eps 21, 24–25	
2014	Ohenro: Hachihachi Aruki	Megumi		
2014	Rail Wars!	Kaori; Nami Jōgasaki	Ep 3 Ep 4	
2014	Shōnen Hollywood -Holly Stage for 49-	Riko Yasuda		
2015	Chivalry of a Failed Knight	Student; Girl		
2015	Food Wars!: Shokugeki no Soma	Service Division girl D	Season 1 Ep 14	
2015	The Fruit of Grisaia	Danny's sister		
2015	The Heroic Legend of Arslan	Merchant's daughter	Season 1 Ep 9	
2015	Is the Order a Rabbit??	Commoner Club member C	Season 2 Ep 10	
2015	Mikagura School Suite	Friend		
2015	Overlord	Nemu Emmot; Vampire Bride	Season 1 Ep 10	
2015	Prison School	Couple Woman	Ep 3	
2015	Seiyu's Life!	Rin Kohana		
2015	Show by Rock!!	Shibarin		
2015	Valkyrie Drive: Mermaid	E9		
2015	Your Lie in April	Female student		
2016	The Disastrous Life of Saiki K.	Maimai	Season 1 Ep 20	
2016	Flip Flappers	Nyunyu		
2016	Phantasy Star Online 2 The Animation	Marika		
2016	Re:Zero − Starting Life in Another World	Petra Leyte		
2016	Scorching Ping Pong Girls	Hanabi Tenka		
2016	Show by Rock!!#	Shibarin	Season 2	
2017	Akiba's Trip: The Animation	Niwaka Denkigai		
2017	Anime-Gataris	Fumi	Ep 4	
2017	Hinako Note	Yua Nakajima		
2017	In Another World with My Smartphone	Yumina Urnea Belfast		
2017	Wake Up, Girls! New Chapter	Noa Morina	Season 2	
2018	Mitsuboshi Colors	Sat-chan		
2018	Slow Start	Sachi Tsubakimori		
2018	Sword Art Online Alternative Gun Gale Online	Shirley/Mai Kirishima		
2018	Umamusume: Pretty Derby	Silence Suzuka		
2019	African Office Worker	Cat	Ep 3	
2019	After School Dice Club	Aya Takayashiki		
2019	Azur Lane	Siren Purifier		
2019	Cautious Hero: The Hero Is Overpowered but Overly Cautious	Nina		
2019	Dr. Stone	Student	Season 1 Ep 1	
2019	Granbelm	Claire Fugo		
2019	If It's for My Daughter, I'd Even Defeat a Demon Lord	Sylvia		
2019	No Guns Life	Scarlett Gosling		
2019	One Piece	Girl	(Season 20) Ep 914	
2019	Saint Seiya: Saintia Shō	Malice Emoni		
2019	We Never Learn	Mizuki Yuiga		
2020	By the Grace of the Gods	Miya		
2020	Digimon Adventure:	Mimi Tachikawa; Mimi's mother Xiaomon	Ep 21; Ep 41	
2020	GeGeGe no Kitarō (2018)	Tsukasa	Ep 93	
2020	Kaguya-sama: Love Is War?	Kozue Makihara	Season 2	
2020	Mewkledreamy	Nene		
2020	Re:Zero − Starting Life in Another World	Petra Leyte	Season 2	
2020	Seton Academy: Join the Pack!	Shiho Ihara		
2020	Umayon	Silence Suzuka; Green Suzuka	Ep 8	
2021	Amaim Warrior at the Borderline	Hina Nose		
2021	Blue Reflection Ray	Yuzuki Shijo		
2021	D_Cide Traumerei the Animation	Eri Ibusaki		
2021	Eden	Sara Grace		
2021	How a Realist Hero Rebuilt the Kingdom	Kaede Foxia		
2021	The Saint's Magic Power is Omnipotent	Nicole Adler		
2021	Scarlet Nexus	Tsugumi Nazar		
2021	Seirei Gensouki: Spirit Chronicles	Aki Sendō		
2021	Show by Rock!! Stars!!	Shibarin	Season 3	
2021	Uma Musume Pretty Derby	Silence Suzuka	Season 2	
2021	Yuki Yuna Is a Hero: Churutto!	Hinata Uesato		
2021	Yuki Yuna Is a Hero: The Great Mankai Chapter	Hinata Uesato	Season 3	
2022	500 Million Year Button	Hiroshi Inoue		
2022	Beast Tamer	Nina		
2022	Build Divide -#FFFFFF (Code White)-	Kamellia	Cour 2	
2022	Digimon Ghost Game	Mayuri	Ep 45	
2022	Don't Hurt Me, My Healer!	Receptionist		
2022	In the Heart of Kunoichi Tsubaki	Hinagiku		
2022	In the Land of Leadale	Mye		
2022	Irodorimidori	Shirona Tsukisuzu		
2022	Kaguya-sama: Love Is War – Ultra Romantic	Kozue Makihara	Season 3	
2022	Legend of Mana: The Teardrop Crystal	Revanshe		
2022	Love Flops	Karin Istel		
2022	Play It Cool, Guys	Miki; Woman	Ep 11; Ep 14	
2022	Raven of the Inner Palace	Jiujiu (Note: Japanese: 九九／じうじう, Hepburn: Jiu Jiu; lit. "Nine-nine or 9-9." (Derived from Mandarin Chinese.))		
2022	Reiwa no Di Gi Charat	Anime Girl 1		
2023	By the Grace of the Gods	Miya	Season 2	
2023	In Another World with My Smartphone	Yumina Urnea Belfast	Season 2	
2023	My Unique Skill Makes Me OP Even at Level 1	Eve Callusleader		
2023	Onimai: I'm Now Your Sister!	Mahiro Oyama		
2023	Ragna Crimson	Majorca Abbott		
2023	Synduality: Noir	Flamme		
2023	Uma Musume Pretty Derby	Silence Suzuka	Season 3	
2024	Blue Archive the Animation	Ako Amau		
2024	Chillin' in Another World with Level 2 Super Cheat Powers	Glareneal		
2024	A Condition Called Love	Non-chan		
2024	Re:Zero − Starting Life in Another World	Petra Leyte	Season 3	
2024	Seirei Gensouki: Spirit Chronicles	Aki Sendō	Season 2	
2024	Pokémon Horizons: The Series	Sazare		
2025	The Shiunji Family Children	Seiha Shiunji		
2026	Yowayowa Sensei	Hiyori Hiwamura		
2026	The Angel Next Door Spoils Me Rotten	Ayaka Kido	Season 2	

=== Anime films ===
Year	Title	Role	Ref.
2013	Bayonetta: Bloody Fate		
2013	Hinata no Aoshigure	Students	
2015	Wake Up, Girls! Beyond the Bottom	Noa Morina	
2016	Pop in Q	Okku	
2019	Fight! Space Attendant Aoi	Ray Hua	
2024	Detective Conan: The Million-dollar Pentagram	Miko Yoshinaga	

=== OVA ===
Year	Title	Role	Other notes	Ref.
2016	Digimon Adventure tri.- Chapter 2: Determination			
2016	Digimon Adventure tri.- Chapter 3: Confession			
2018	Re:Zero − Starting Life in Another World "Memory Snow"	Petra Leyte	OVA 1	
2018	Uma Musume Pretty Derby "BNW's Oath"	Silence Suzuka	Season 1 Extras (OVA 1-3)	
2019	We Never Learn	Mizuki Yuiga	OVA 1	
2020	We Never Learn	Mizuki Yuiga	OVA 2	

=== Video games ===
Year	Title	Role	Ref.
2013	Myauji (Note: Japanese: みゃうじー, Hepburn: Mi~yauji-.)		
2014	BREAK Jan BURST (Note: Japanese: ブレーク雀バースト／ブレークじゃんバースト, Hepburn: Bure-ku Ji~yan Ba-suto; lit. "Break Sparrow Burst.")	Lily	
2014	Heroes Placement	Fū Inokashira; Mizuha Kanemoto; Suigetsu Kino; Ursula Urkus; Akiko Mikata; Hatchō Okazaki	
2014	Phantasy Star Online 2 es	Thor Marinka; Fleet Marinka; Sylph Marinka	
2014	Sennen no Kyoshin (Note: Japanese: 千年の巨神／せんねんのきょしん, Hepburn: Sennen no Ki~yoshin; lit. "Millennium Giant god.")	Marl	
2014	Shiro Project (Note: Japanese: 御城プロジェクト／おしろプロジェクト, Hepburn: O Shiro Puroji~ekuto; lit. "Castle Project.")	Oshi Castle; Tottori Castle; Tsuzurao Castle; Toyama Castle	
2014	Tale of Satomi Hakken: Princess Hamaji Chronicle (Note: Japanese: 里見八犬伝 浜路姫之記／さとみはっけんでん はまじひめのき, Hepburn: Satomi Hakken-den Hamaji-Hime no-ki.)	Shōgatsu	
2014	Tokyo 7th Sisters	Miu Aihara	
2014	Toys Drive	Parute Leonard	
2015	Aegis of Earth: Protonovus Assault	Kikka	
2015	Age of Ishtaria (Note: Known in Japan as Saga of Ishtaria.)	Al-Hazard; Seiten Taisei; Rosenkreuz; Tsukuyomi	
2015	Brave Sword X Blaze Soul	Mjölnir	
2015	Bride Collection	Rin Kohara; Megumi	
2015	CLOSERS	Usagi Shirai; Shaolin	
2015	Criminal Girls 2: Party Favors	Enri	
2015	Diss World	Styx	
2015	Fire Emblem Fates	Midoriko / Midori	
2015	Kemono Friends	Iriomote cat Babirusa	
2015	Sakana Connection (Note: Japanese: サカナコネクション, Hepburn: Sakana Konekushi~yon; lit. "Fish Connection.")	Mayori	
2015	Sengoku Kitan MURAMASA -Miyabi- (Note: Japanese: 戦国姫譚MURAMASA-雅-／せんごくきたんMURAMASA-みやび-, Hepburn: Sengoku Ki-tan Muramasa Miyabi; lit. "Tale of the Japanese Warring States Princess Muramasa: Miyabi.")	Nene; Ōmura Sumitada	
2015	Shirohime Quest (Note: Japanese: 城姫クエスト／しろひめクエスト, Hepburn: Shiro Hime Kuesuto; lit. "Castle Princess Quest.")	Uwajima Castle	
2015	Shooting Girl	Karen Nishido	
2015	Syanago Collection (Note: Japanese: 車なごコレクション／しゃなごコレクション, Hepburn: Shi~ya-nago Korekushi~yon; lit. "Car Girls Collection.")	Toyota Corolla Fielder; Daihatsu Copen Robe; Toyota Probox; Toyota Crown Royal	
2015	Valiant Knights	Sian Verona	
2015	Yōkai Hyakki-tan! (Note: Japanese: 妖怪百姫たん！／ようかいひゃっきたん！, Hepburn: Yōkai Hi~yakki-tan!; lit. "Hundred Apparition Little-Princesses!")	Tsuchigumo; Hawk god Taotie	
2016	Akashic Re:cords	"Princess Iron Fan" Rakshasi "Storyteller of a Thousand Nights" Scheherazade "Little Barbarian" Zhang Fei	
2016	The Alchemist Code (Note: Know in Japan as For Whom the Alchemist Exists.)	Shayna	
2016	BLADE -Thousand Blades that Fell from Heaven-	Limon	
2016	Bravery Chronicle	Ellis; Lily; Eligos	
2016	Circle Pandemica code-S-	Hazuki Yakumo	
2016	Dragon Genesis -Bonds of the Holy War-	Reginleif	
2016	Formation Girls	Akane Akao	
2016	The God of High School	Aoi Momoko	
2016	HIDE AND FIRE	Jeje	
2016	Irodorimidori	Shirona Tsukisuzu	
2016	Mary Skelter: Nightmares	Shirayukihime	
2016	Medarot Girls Mission (Note: Also known as Medabots.)	Kurumi Ayano	
2016	Miracle Nikki	Sakura	
2016	Phantom Tower Senki Griffon	Female voice	
2016	Reversal Othellonia	Lean & Gale	
2016	Samurai Warriors: Spirit of Sanada	Chacha	
2016	Shining Star Rebellion	Chacha	
2016	Shiro Project:RE	Oshi Castle; Tsuzurao Castle; Tottori Castle; Toyama Castle; Swallow's Nest	
2016	Sid Story	Veronica	
2016	THE TOWER OF PRINCESS	Odile	
2016	Vacuum Tube Dolls	Ilsa	
2016	White Cat Project	Mari Plain	
2016	Yuba's Emblem	Seeda Shera; Kohika; Yana	
2017	Aerial Legends	Sinbad	
2017	Alternative Girls	Chiho Onitsuka	
2017	Aura Kingdom -Link of Hearts- (Note: Also known as Fantasy Frontier Online (TW & HK), and/or Innocent World ／ Gensō Shin'iki -Cross to Fate- (JP).)	Lumikki; Venus	
2017	Axis Battle Princess ～Maidens Running on the Battlefield～	P-40 Warhawk; Fairey Fulmar; Sōryū; P-51D Mustang; Bf 109F Friedrich; Navy Type 0 carrier fighter Model 21	
2017	Black Knights～Knights Chronicle～	O'Hara; Julie	
2017	Blue Reflection: Sword of the Girl Who Dances in Illusions	Yuzuki Shijou	
2017	Clash of Panzers (Note: "Panzers" with an "s", published by ©DMM Games; not to be confused with "Clash of Panzer(: Tank Battle)" by ©FUNPLAY Games.)	Kati Gustav Emil Mannerheim	
2017	Exile Election	Misa Ichijo	
2017	Figureheads Ace	Miyabi	
2017	Groove Coaster 3EX: Dream Party	Miyabi	
2017	Gun Gun Pixies	Bītan / Usamaeru	
2017	Kirara Fantasia	Lamp	
2017	LayereD Stories 0	Mishara; Sufin; Mary-Q	
2017	Lord of Vermilion IV	Angolmois	
2017	Maiden Gears Invasion	Assault artillery III "Livy"; Hummel self-propelled artillery "Beene"; Tortoise heavy assault tank "Guinevere"	
2017	Mitra Sphere	Hildegard Tanaise; Poroshiri Hatun	
2017	Monster Hunter Generations	Milcy	
2017	Monster Monpiece: Castle Panzers	Frau Sowers	
2017	Q&Q Answers	Divine Comedy	
2017	Show by Rock!!	Shibarin	
2017	Tenka Hyakken -Zan- (Note: Japanese: 天華百剣-斬-／てんかひゃっけん-ざん-, Hepburn: Tenka Hi~yakken Zan; lit. "Tenka Hundred Swords -Slash-.")	Kamewaritō (Note: Japanese: 瓶割刀, Hepburn: Kame wari tō; lit. "Bottle Splitting Sword.")	
2017	Warship Girls R	Ying Rui; Shikinami	
2017	Yuki Yuna is a Hero: Bouquet of Brilliance	Hinata Uesato	
2018	Abyss Horizon	Kiev; Phoebe; Le Fantasque	
2018	Alice Gear Aegis	Mutsumi Koashi	
2018	Azur Lane	Hatsuharu	
2018	Balance of Plecatus	Niente	
2018	Browndust	Eleen	
2018	CARAVAN STORIES	Rorotata	
2018	Death end re;Quest	Clea Glaive / Kaede Hīzumi	
2018	Freezing Extension	Cathy Lockharte	
2018	Graffiti Smash	Sanye	
2018	King's Raid	Shea	
2018	LBX Girls (Note: Known in Japan as Armored Girls.)	Ririko Hanazono / Odin; Kiyora Takanashi / Dominion	
2018	Magia Record: Puella Magi Madoka☆Magica Side Story	Leila Ibuki	
2018	Maplus + Girlfriend	Emma Koroki	
2018	Mary Skelter 2	Shirayukihime	
2018	Mega Smash	Misha	
2018	Mobius Final Fantasy	Sophie	
2018	ORDINAL STRATA	Stella	
2018	Quiz RPG: The World of Mystic Wiz	Cheche Urulare	
2018	Seiken Manifestia (Note: Japanese: 政剣マニフェスティア, Hepburn: Sei-Ken Manifesutia; lit. "Political Sword Manifestia.")	Quartier Ugaki; Claris Okazaki	
2018	SPEED WITCH BATTLE: The White Witch and the Five Hopes	Regina	
2018	Super Gundam Royale	Fiorina Feeley (Mobile Suit Gundam Walpurgis)	
2018	Sword Art Online: Fatal Bullet	Shirley / Mai Kirishima (SAOAGGO DLC 2 additional character)	
2018	Teria Saga	Selen; Ronnie; Madeleine	
2019	Arca Last: The World That Ends and the Fruit of the Diva	Akane	
2019	Azur Lane Crosswave	Siren Purifier	
2019	Blue Oath	Light cruiser "San Juan"; Battlecruiser "Hood"; Battleship "Vittorio Veneto"; Unknown-H "Eta"	
2019	DarkAvenger X	Archer	
2019	Fire Emblem Heroes	Kronya; Monica von Ochs; Midoriko / Midori	
2019	Fire Emblem: Three Houses	Kronya; Monica von Ochs	
2019	Grimms Echoes	Gretel	
2019	Gun Gun Pixies HH	Bītan / Usamaeru	
2019	Kemono Friends 3	African Python	
2019	KonoSuba: Fantastic Days	Melissa	
2019	The Magnificent Kotobuki: Take Off Girls of the Sky!	Gerbera	
2019	Overlord -MASS FOR THE DEAD-	Nemu Emmot	
2019	Seven Days of Eternity - The Endless Beginning	"Star Girl" Lulu "Heavenly Dance" Jariya	
2019	Shachibato! President, It's Time for Battle!	Lady Cool	
2019	Shinki Awakening: MELTY MAIDEN	Seraphis	
2019	War of the Visions: Final Fantasy Brave Exvius (Note: Known in Japan as War of the Visions: Final Fantasy Brave Exvius: Phantom War.)	Li'l Leela	
2019	World Flipper	Kara	
2020	Crash Fever	Mobius	
2020	Dead or Alive Xtreme Venus Vacation	Patty	
2020	Death end re;Quest 2	Clea Glaive / Kaede Hīzumi	
2020	LBX Girls: Mizel Crisis (Note: Known in Japan as Armored Girls: Crisis By The Mizel's REMNANTS.)	Ririko Hanazono / LBCS Odin	
2020	Mary Skelter Finale	Shirayukihime; Iron Maiden	
2020	Poker Stadium	Noël	
2020	Show by Rock!! Fes A Live	Shibarin	
2020	WitchSpring3 Re:Fine – The Story of Eirudy	Eirudy	
2021	Alchemy Stars	Maggie; Pate & Pashi (Pashi)	
2021	Arknights	La Pluma	
2021	Blue Archive	Ako Amau	
2021	Code Geass: Genesic Re;CODE	Ruki	
2021	COUNTER: SIDE -BEYOND THE END-	Edel Meitner	
2021	D_CIDE TRAUMEREI	Eri Ibusaki	
2021	Doodle Kingdom	Yuno Momose	
2021	Elyon	Eve Este	
2021	Fate/Grand Order	Lancer / Ruler Fairy Knight - Tam Lin Lancelot (Melusine / Melusine Ondine)	
2021	Granblue Fantasy	Enyo; Silence Suzuka	
2021	GranSaga	Eleanor	
2021	NEO: The World Ends with You	Coco Atarashi	
2021	Pokémon Masters EX	Evelyn	
2021	Re:Zero − Starting Life in Another World: The Prophecy of the Throne	Petra Leyte	
2021	Rune Factory 5	Simone	
2021	Samurai Warriors 5	Mitsuki	
2021	Scarlet Nexus	Tsugumi Nazar	
2021	Star Melody Yumemi Dreamer	Ayumu Kazabari	
2021	Tokimeki Memorial Girl's Side: 4th Heart	Hikaru Hanatsubaki	
2021	Umamusume: Pretty Derby	Silence Suzuka	
2022	Doraemon Story of Seasons: Friends of the Great Kingdom (Note: Known in Japan as Doraemon: Nobita's Harvest Story: The Kingdom of Nature and Everyone's Home.)	Ori (Penguin)	
2022	Dragon Quest X Online: Heroes of the Heavenly Stars (update Version 6.3)	Tetral	
2022	Echocalypse -Scarlet Divine Covenant-	Suisei / Comet	
2022	Fire Emblem Warriors: Three Hopes	Kronya; Monica von Ochs	
2022	INFINITY SOULS (Magical Girl Lyrical Nanoha)	Koi	
2022	Shadowverse	Silence Suzuka	
2022	Xenoblade Chronicles 3	X	
2023	Dragon Quest Monsters: The Dark Prince	Hoimin / Healie (Healslime)	
2023	Granblue Fantasy Versus -Rising-	Silence Suzuka (Uma Musume Pretty Derby Premium Avatar Set DLC)	
2023	Guardian Tales	"Sea Vendor" Sia	
2023	Master Detective Archives: RAIN CODE	Waruna	
2023	One Piece Odyssey	Lim	
2024	Death end re;Quest Code Z	Kaede Hīzumi / Clea Glaive	
2025	Trickcal: Chibi Go	Yomi	
2026	Azur Lane	Patty	

=== Live-action ===
Year	Title	Role
2022	Anime Supremacy!	Aoi Mureno

=== Dubbing ===
Year	Title	Role
2020	All Saints Street	Lily Angel

=== Drama CDs ===
Year	Title	Role
2018	Onimai: I'm Now Your Sister!	Mahiro Oyama

== Discography ==
=== Albums ===
List of media, with selected chart positions
Title	Album details	Peak positions
Title	Album details	JPN
Hitotsu	Released: February 23, 2022; Label: Nippon Columbia; Formats: CD, CD+BD, digital, streaming	30

=== Singles ===
List of singles, with selected chart positions
Title	Date	Peak chart position	Album
Title	Date	JPN Oricon	Album
"Yume Mitai, Demo Yume ja Nai"	February 24, 2021	29	Hitotsu
"New Story"	July 14, 2021	20	Hitotsu
"Love & Moon"	October 12, 2022	14	non-album single
"—" denotes a release that did not chart.
