= List of In Another World with My Smartphone episodes =

In Another World with My Smartphone is an anime series adapted from the light novel of the same title written by Patora Fuyuhara and illustrated by Eiji Usatsuka. The series is directed by Takeyuki Yanase at Production Reed and written by Natsuko Takahashi. Exit Tunes composed the music. It aired from July 11 to September 26, 2017, on AT-X and other channels. AŌP performed the opening theme song "Another World" while Maaya Uchida, Yui Fukuo, Chinatsu Akasaki, Marika Kouno, Nanami Yamashita, and Sumire Uesaka performed different versions of the ending theme song "Junjō Emotional" (純情エモーショナル, Pure Emotional). Crunchyroll streamed and licensed the anime, while Funimation produced an English dub and released it on home video as part of the two companies' partnership. Funimation released the series for home video in the British Isles, and in Australia and New Zealand, through their distributors at Sony Pictures UK and Universal Sony, respectively.

== Series overview ==
Season	Episodes	Originally released	
Season	Episodes	First released	Last released
1	12	July 11, 2017	September 26, 2017
2	12	April 3, 2023	June 19, 2023

== Episodes ==
=== Season 1 (2017) ===
No. overall	No. in season	Title (Note: All English episode titles are taken from Crunchyroll.)	Original release date
1	1	"Awakening, and Another World"; Transliteration: "Mezame, soshite Isekai." (Japanese: 目覚め、そして異世界。)	July 11, 2017
God apologizes to Touya Mochizuki for accidentally killing him with lightning and offers to resurrect him in the new world. Touya agrees on condition that he can bring a smartphone that can still connect to Earth's internet and be recharged with magic. God also boosts Touya's stamina, reflexes and memory skills. In the new world, Touya sells his clothes to an eager tailor in exchange for ones that will allow him to blend in and saves the twin sisters Elze and Linze Silhoueska from several thugs whom he easily defeat. They then check into the Silver Moon Inn where Micah, the owner, mistakenly believes Touya is Elze’s boyfriend, but the latter quickly denies it. Afterwards, the trio form a party taking on paid quests, with the Silhoueskas teaching Touya how to read the world's language and use magic. Unlike most magicians who can only use one or two, and some like Linze who can use three, Touya becomes capable of using every type of magic, making him immensely powerful. Later on, Touya arrives at a café called Parent where he helps Aer, the cafe's owner, find a recipe to make some delicious ice cream.
2	2	"First Journey, and Samurai"; Transliteration: "Hatsutabi, soshite Samurai." (Japanese: 初旅、そしてサムライ。)	July 18, 2017
Touya and the Silhoueskas help a samurai named Yae Kokonoe fight off several thugs and after providing her a meal, invite her to join their party, whilst Touya continues to learn as many magic spells as he can, including Null Magic which has a variety of uses. While heading to the royal capital to deliver a letter, the group are ambushed by some Lizards summoned by a dark magician intending to attack a royal carriage. As the group defeat the Lizards along with the magician, Touya enters the carriage where he casts a Null healing spell, saving a butler named Leim from his death. Lady Sushie "Sue" Urnea Ortlinde, who was also in the carriage and whom the magician tried to kidnap, thanks Touya for saving Leim and altogether, the group head to the royal capital where Sue brings Touya to her father, Duke Alfred Ortlinde. The Duke thanks Touya for protecting his daughter, but reveals that Duchess Ellen Ortlinde, Sue's mother and the Duke's wife, was blinded from an illness and requests a healing spell powerful enough to cure the Duchess's blindness. Touya agrees and casts a Null healing spell on the Duchess, curing her blindness. The Duke gives Touya 40 Platinum coins (worth around 40 million yen) as gratitude for saving his family as well as 4 royal medals, which represent Touya, Yae and the Silhoueskas now under the Duke's protection. After delivering the letter, Yae agrees to join the party.
3	3	"Shogi board, and Underground Ruins"; Transliteration: "Shōgiban, soshite Chika Iseki." (Japanese: 将棋盤、そして地下遺跡。)	July 25, 2017
Touya discovers demi-human races at the royal capital, such as elves and beast-men and helps a lost fox-girl named Arma find her older sister, Olga. As Touya and the girls go shopping, Touya buys a magician's coat that protects magicians against magic they can use but makes them weaker against magic they can't use. Later on, Touya casts a Null crafting spell turning a tree trunk into a Shogi board at the behest of a woodcutter, which Touya brings to the Duke and teaches him how to play. The next day, Touya and the girls accept a quest to destroy a Dullahan near the ruins of the old capital city. After the Dullahan was defeated, Touya uses a Null locating spell and finds an item of magical value hidden in a secret dungeon. The item later turns out to be the energy source for an artificial crystal beast that can repair any damage done to it. Elze is wounded during the fight, but Touya heals her. The group manage to defeat the beast after Touya extracts the energy source. The group return to the royal capital where they tell the Duke what really happened, and the Duke suspects that the beast may have been the reason why the old capital was abandoned and asks Touya to help him in an investigation the next day. Later on, Touya is contacted by the Duke, who reveals that his brother, the King of the royal capital, has been poisoned.
4	4	"Engagement, and an Uninvited Visitor"; Transliteration: "Kon'yaku, soshite Oshikake." (Japanese: 婚約、そして押し掛け。)	August 1, 2017
En route to the royal capital, the Duke becomes concerned and tells Touya that the king's eldest daughter, Princess Yumina Urnea Belfast, may succeed his throne if he dies. Touya and the Duke arrive at the capital where Touya casts a Null Healing spell, curing the King's poison. His unique abilities draw the interest of Charlotte, the family’s mage. Yumina quickly begins to fall for Touya. Balsa, a Count working for the capital, claims the poisoner is the capital's ambassador, who later turns out to be Olga, and has been accused of sending poisoned wine to the king. After using a search spell to verify that no poison was detected in the wine, Touya decides to re-enact the banquet at which the king was poisoned, and after asking General Leon and Balsa to drink from the king's glass, determines that Balsa poisoned the wine in just the king's glass, and framed Olga by claiming that she sent the king poisoned bottled wine. Balsa unsuccessfully tries to escape. With Olga acquitted and Balsa arrested, the king agrees to let Yumina embark on a 2-year engagement with Touya, hoping it would give Yumina time to win his heart and Touya time to decide to marry Yumina. After the royal visit, Yumina joins the party and teaches Touya how to summon magic, during which Touya summons a powerful tiger spirit called the White Monarch, whom he forges a pact with and renames her as Kohaku.
5	5	"Slime Castle, and New Functions"; Transliteration: "Suraimu Kyassuru, soshite Shinkinō." (Japanese: スライムキャッスル、そして新機能。)	August 8, 2017
Touya accepts a quest to go to an abandoned castle to investigate a deceased magician's research on Slime Beasts, but the girls are reluctant to aid Touya due to their concern that slimes dissolve clothing. At the castle, the group encounter numerous slimes and discover that the magician had created a slime capable of transforming into models of beautiful girls. After Touya saves the girls from being caught by the slimes (who damage their clothes, forcing them to wear white sheets), the group decide to burn the castle down, destroying the magician's research. Later on, Touya helps Yae bring a lost girl to her mother by activating a Null search spell on Touya's phone. In turn, Yae requests Touya to locate her older brother, who is safe at a dojo, much to Yae's joy. Meanwhile, Touya helps Linze learn a new water bomb spell. He then goes shopping with Elze, and buys a dress she admires. As the girls request Touya to do the same thing to them, Yumina receives a letter from the royal capital offering Touya's knighthood as thanks for finding the culprit behind the king's poisoning.
6	6	"Moving, and a Dragon"; Transliteration: "Hikkoshi, soshite Doragon." (Japanese: 引っ越し、そしてドラゴン。)	August 15, 2017
After Touya declines the knighthood offer, the king decides to let Touya and Yumina take ownership of a large mansion instead. To Elze, Linze and Yae's surprise, Touya wants them to live there as well; he explains he sees them like family, accidentally implying he wants to marry them as well. Yumina also mistakes his words, managing to get the girls to calm down and accept the offer. Staff is also hired to watch over the mansion, including Leim's older brother Laim and two maids: Lapis and Cecile. Later on, Sue and the Duke arrive at the mansion, where the Duke requests Touya to make a trip to the Kingdom of Mismede following their alliance. Touya notices a knight named Sir Lyon having a crush on Olga, and later helps him choose a gift Olga likes at Arma's behest. Later that night, a nearby town was attacked by a black dragon, whom Touya and the girls later defeat. A red dragon appears and apologizes to the group for not getting there in time to stop the black dragon. Kohaku tells the dragon to let the Azure Monarch (presumably the dragon king), maintain better control of the dragons. The next day, Touya falls asleep and later finds himself in Yumina's lap. Yumina challenges and beats the girls in a game of rock-paper-scissors over the chance to have Touya sleep on them.
7	7	"Nation of Beastmen, and an Observer"; Transliteration: "Jūjin no Kuni, soshite Kanshisha." (Japanese: 獣人の国、そして監視者。)	August 22, 2017
Touya's party arrive at Mismede's capital and attend an audience with the king. During the audience the King asks Touya to duel with him. During the duel, the king reveals his own Null magic, "Accel", that gives him enhanced speed, which Touya learns to use and by combining both "Accel" and "Boost", defeats him. That night, Touya has an encounter with a fairy named Leen, who is more than 600 years old, who then teaches Touya the "Program" spell, that infuses objects with pre-determined magical properties. After Touya demonstrates his own "Program" skill, Leen, who was impressed with Touya's skill, offers to teach him more magic, but he declines. The next day, Touya, accompanied by Linze and Yumina, buys some materials to create a pistol-sword, using "Program" to infuse it with auto-reload and blade-extending features. Both girls ask him to create firearms for them, which he does. On their way back, Touya realizes that they are being followed and briefly separates from Linze and Yumina to confront their stalkers, who are revealed to be Lapis and Cecile, who are spies sent by the king to watch and protect Yumina. They are also the ones who secretly helped them against the dragon. At their request, Touya promises to keep it a secret from the others, while Leen decides that she is not giving up on Touya so easily. Later at night, Touya opens a portal to Belfast, allowing both kings to have their meet with each other.
8	8	"Daily Life, and Onward to Eashen"; Transliteration: "Hibi no Kurashi, soshite Īshen e." (Japanese: 日々の暮らし、そしてイーシェンへ。)	August 29, 2017
After returning from Mismede and going into the bathroom at the wrong time, Touya uses his powers to create a bicycle for himself, but when the girls and Duke Alfred show interest in it, he ends up making enough for all of them to ride. Sometime later, Touya goes to the city to buy some supplies when he finds a little girl named Renne being beaten by some thugs for stealing in their territory. After dealing with the attackers, Touya invites Renne to work as a maid in his mansion and she accepts, promising that she will not steal again. Later on, Leen appears at the mansion and asks for Touya's help, as she needs him to open a gate to Yae's homeland, Eashen, for her to travel there. However, Touya cannot open gates to places he has not seen yet, and Leen teaches him another Null spell that allows him to access Yae's memories of Eashen, allowing him to open a gate there. Yae then travels along with Touya and the others back to her homeland.
9	9	"Oedo, and the Immortal Gem"; Transliteration: "Oedo, soshite Fushi no Hōgyoku." (Japanese: オエド、そして不死の宝玉。)	September 5, 2017
Using Recall and Gate to go to Eashen, Touya and gang arrive and go to Yae's house where they were told that her father and brother are fighting in a war. Using Touya's abilities they quickly find both and Touya helps by defeating the Undead Oni Masked Soldiers. After being thanked by Tokugawa, Tsubaki comes out from the shadows and asks for help to save the Takeda's as Kansukay had betrayed Shingen, Touya agrees with Leen following. After arriving they free 3 other generals and save Shingen, who was under the control of Kansukay's eye, which is then stolen using Apport and broken; this leads to Kansukay dying. After helping the Takeda family, Baba helps Touya by using Recall and Gate to let Touya go to an island near the Ancient Ruins that Leen was looking for.
10	10	"Ocean, and Vacations"; Transliteration: "Umi, soshite Bakansu." (Japanese: 海、そしてバカンス。)	September 12, 2017
After using Gate to travel to an island near the Ancient Ruins, Touya invites all of his friends for a day of swimming at the beach, and creates a changing tent for the girls to change into their swimsuits. During this, Touya tries to go diving towards the Ancient Ruins, but it is too far without him drowning in the process. Kohaku then helps Touya summon Black Emperor who is composed of a snake and a turtle. They become bonded to Touya, who names them Sango (Turtle) and Kokuyou (Snake). They help Touya reach the Ancient Ruins where they are soon met by a maid in the Garden of Babylon.
11	11	"Panties, and an Aerial Garden"; Transliteration: "Pantsu, soshite Kūchū-Teien." (Japanese: ぱんつ、そして空中庭園。)	September 19, 2017
After meeting Francesca, the artificial maid in the Garden of Babylon, Touya is named the new owner of the Garden. Later, he uses a gate to bring the others, and upon seeing Francesca, the girls become suspicious of Touya and jealous. Yumina then takes the girls on a walk to discuss the same topic she broached the first day the gang moved into Touya's mansion: that the girls love Touya as much as she does and for them to become his brides as well, to which they all nervously agree. Later Francesca kisses Touya (simply as a means of sampling his DNA through his saliva), shocking the girls. However, Francesca's actions cause Linze to muster the courage to confess her true feelings for Touya, telling him that she loves him, and then Linze proceeds to kiss Touya in front of everyone as well, shocking the girls even more.
12	12	"Decisions, and With My Smartphone"; Transliteration: "Ketsudan, soshite Sumātofon to tomoni." (Japanese: 決断、そしてスマートフォンとともに。)	September 26, 2017
Touya and the gang arrive back at the mansion with Francesca. Afterwards, Yumina helps Linze become one of Touya's brides, as her country allows multiple marriages. The next morning comes with Yae and Elze also becoming Touya's brides. With this, Touya goes to the Garden where he talks to Regina Babylon, the Professor who made Babylon. After this, Touya seeks help with his love interests with Kami and the Goddess Of Love. Touya then returns to the mansion and tells his brides that he is not ready to marry all of them, as he doesn't think he is capable of making them all happy yet, which the girls come to understand. Leen talks with Francesca, who informs her that Dr. Babylon foresaw Touya having nine wives; though omits Leen herself will be one. In a post-credit scene, Touya is shown walking through town before running into a stranger named Ende.

=== Season 2 (2023) ===
No. overall	No. in season	Title	Original release date
13	1	"Engagement Rings and a Hot Spring"; Transliteration: "Konyaku Yubiwa, Soshite Onsen." (Japanese: 婚約指輪、そして温泉。)	April 3, 2023
After defeating Mithril Giants, Touya and Yumina are promoted by the Adventurers' guild. Leen wishes to search for more of the Babylon teleportation arrays. However, Touya is uncertain, but promises to help if Leen locates any of them. God summons Touya to check on him and Goddess of Love insists that since he has already given engagement rings to his four fiancés, he needs to step up the romance. The fiancés worry people may take advantage of Touya’s kindness in the future. Touya takes Yae to replace her broken sword with a mithril one and agrees when Yae asks to hold hands. The king of Belfast is thrilled by Yumina’s engagement but the queen worries it will expose Touya to jealous rivals and advises Touya to increase his achievements. Touya realizes marrying Yumina might make him king one day, which made him uneasy. Touya helps the Silver Moon Inn to attract more customers by building them a hot spring bath. In the bath, the fiancés share their reasons for falling in love with Touya. Francesca attempts to join Touya in the men's section of the bath, but triggers a paralysis spell Touya installed to prevent peeking. Leen announces she has already found the next Babylon island.
14	2	"Deserted Survivors and a Workshop"; Transliteration: "Sabireta Sabaibā to Wākushoppu" (Japanese: さびれたサバイバーとワークショップ)	April 10, 2023
Everyone travels to Sandora Kingdom in the desert and spot another crystal beast, now known as a Phrase, chasing a group of people. Touya encounters Ende again, who defeats the Phrase. Ende reveals the barrier protecting the world against the Phrase is weakening, allowing the Phrase to search for their king. Ende teleports away. The group are adventurers led by Rebecca escorting runaway female slaves to safety. They learn that the collars that the slave girls are wearing prevent them from disobeying orders and trying to remove them or escape may result in death. The only person who can remove them has died. Touya uses his powers to remove the collars and Yumina offers them sanctuary in Belfast since they cannot return to their kingdom due to their status as slaves still remaining, and they are sent to stay in Touya's mansion for the time being. Touya reveals Ende was a foreigner he helped join the adventurers guild. Francesca reveals Regina created a robot suit as an anti-Phrase weapon, stored on a Babylon island in a vehicle hangar. Excavating the Ruin, Touya is teleported to Babylon’s Workshop and meets Rosetta, who offers him the workshop if he guesses the color of her underwear. Exasperated, Touya uses magic to see under her dress and finds her panties are completely see through. Rosetta kisses him, registering his DNA, and shows him the workshop is an ultimate tool that can create any item, so Touya creates an upgraded pistol-sword from mithril. Touya sends the Workshop island to Belfast to merge with the Garden island. Back at the mansion, at Rebecca’s request, Touya takes in the former slave girls until they can find employment.
15	3	"Collecting Books and a Library Café"; Transliteration: "Hon Shūshū, Soshite Dokusho Kissa." (Japanese: 本収集、そして読書喫茶。)	April 17, 2023
Touya creates jobs for the former slave girls by opening the Moon-Reader café, which also includes a library, and employing them. Will, one of Rebecca’s younger adventurers, tells Touya of another Null spell, Gravity. Guild receptionist Prim requests he stock a particular book series at Moon-Reader. Yumina frets as the series is a Yaoi erotic series anonymously written by her close friend Reliel, Princess of the Refreese Imperium. Deciding it would be good for business, Touya agrees but is inundated with requests for similar books from his female customers. Visiting Refreese for the books, he encounters a strange Yaoi obsessed girl who, desiring one of the books he already bought, offers to trade her autograph, accidentally revealing she is Reliel Incognito. Touya copies the book for her using the Workshop while she reconnects with Yumina. Will has a crush on one of the former slave girls and wishes to be able to protect her, so Touya sends him to train with the royal knights. While visiting the Silver Moon with Elze, Touya collects a cute outfit he designed for her which she loves. Reliel writes a new book about a bisexual magician blatantly based on Touya; humiliated by this, he promises much punishment if he ever sees Reliel again.
16	4	"Upheaval in the Castle and an Imperial Princess"; Transliteration: "Gekidō no Shiro to Kōjo" (Japanese: 激動の城と皇女)	April 24, 2023
Touya visits the Regulus Empire for more books and finds civil war has broken out as General Bazoar rebels against Emperor Zephyrus. Touya rescues Princess Lucia and her bodyguard Carol from the soldiers. Bazoar intends to invade Belfast, Mismede, and Refreese with two artifacts that let him summon a demon and makes him resistant to magical and physical damage. Touya teleports away with Zephyrus, Lucia, and Carol but cannot find Lucia’s brother Prince Romero. Yumina, sensing Lucia has a crush on Touya, invites her to a private conversation. Yumina’s father announces the Queen is pregnant and if it is a boy, it would inherit the throne instead of Touya, which the king had intended by marrying Touya to Yumina. Rosetta reveals the two artifacts originally came from the Storehouse island. Using his phone's search function, Touya locates Romero. Touya defeats the demons physical resistance by hitting it on the head with his sword, enchanted by Gravity to weigh hundreds of tons. He then defeats Bazoar’s magic resistance by exposing him to a Sludge-slime, emitting such a foul stench that Bazoar faints. Zephyrus reclaims his throne, but Touya is unable to celebrate with his fiancés, who are repulsed by the stench stuck to his clothes.
17	5	"The Fifth Wife and a Newly Founded Nation"; Transliteration: "Go Ninme, Soshite Shin Kokka Juritsu." (Japanese: 五人目、そして新国家樹立。)	May 1, 2023
Against Touya’s usual objections, his fiancés, Tristwin and Zephyrus reward him by engaging him to Lucia to ensure peace between Belfast and Regulus. They also grant Touya land at the border of both kingdoms to rule his own (very small) kingdom, to which he names it Brunhild, free from interference by other kingdoms. Using the Workshop and raw materials from a derelict castle, Rosetta builds a castle in Brunhild to Touya and the fiancés' specifications in a mere three days. Leen deliberately gets a job as Mismede’s ambassador and moves into the castle too. Emperor Rig of Refreese Imperium is the first to begin diplomatic relations with Brunhild and Touya narrowly avoids engagement to Reliel who fortunately is already engaged. While preparing to host the grand opening of the castle, Touya is visited by Tsubaki, who reveals the Takeda clan has collapsed due to the new Lord’s corruption, so she and her entire clan wish to serve Touya as Brunhild’s first citizens. With help from Kousaka, Touya begins constructing a city and a merchant’s network. The party is a success with kings from every nation in attendance. During the fireworks display, Touya provides Lucia her own engagement ring before holding hands watching the fireworks.
18	6	"The Alchemy Ward and an Unexpected Reunion"; Transliteration: "“Nekintō”, Soshite Omowanu Saikai." (Japanese: 『錬金棟』、そして思わぬ再会。)	May 8, 2023
Touya and the girls locate another teleportation circle that sends Touya to the Alchemy Laboratory Island with its keeper Flora. Flora accepts Touya after making him grope her breasts. Touya learns the lab is an advanced medical facility Professor Regina used to create sexual stimulants. Touya locates a Null spell that lets him fly. Love Goddess informs Touya it is time to meet Yae, Elze and Linze’s parents. Yae’s father demands a duel with Touya, but when Yae offers to duel her father instead he accepts their marriage. Elze and Linze’s aunt and uncle accept their marriage without issue. Ende appears and reveals the Phrase are searching for their king’s power core, which is somewhere inside a random human. Ende is also looking for the core and claims he is just a traveler on a 5000 year adventure. Touya asks Francesca to mass produce the anti-Phrase suits, but the Workshop doesn’t have the materials. Needing materials and the other islands quickly, Kohaku suggests contracting the Flame Emperor, a Phoenix and Queen of Birds. Upon summoning her, she easily agrees to a contract and is named Kougyoku. With her power over birds, Kougyoku sends every bird in the world to search for the still missing teleportation circles.
19	7	"The Hangar and Frame Gears"; Transliteration: "“Kakunōko”, Soshite Furēmu gia." (Japanese: 『格納庫』、そしてフレームギア。)	May 15, 2023
Touya wakes up to find Yumina sleeping next to him, to his surprise. The birds locate another teleportation circle. Reaching the island, Touya meets Fredmonica, who registers Touya as owner of her Hangar Island and the anti-Phrase Frame-Gear suits. Unfortunately, the suits run on Ether Liquid, which can only be made by the still missing Research Lab island. Flora offers to make an inferior version, but requires a rare spellstone over twelve inches long, of which there are only six in the entire world. Fortunately, one is in Brunhild, so Flora promises to have the fuel ready in one month. Touya and the fiancés train in Frame-Units, virtual reality machines that simulate piloting a Frame-Gear. Sue abruptly demands to be Touya’s next fiancé as she is being pressured into marrying Prince Zabune of Linhea Kingdom, a 30 year old man suspected of paedophilia, whom she does not like. The fiancés consent to Sue marrying Touya for her protection. Touya learns Zabune’s maternal uncle Wardack is Linhea’s Prime Minister and frequently conceals Zabune’s crimes. Zabune also has a much kinder half brother, son of the king’s concubine. Sue’s father Duke Ortlinde informs Linhea’s diplomatic emissary Sue will be marrying Touya. Hearing this, the emissary reveals he is Cloud, Zabune’s brother, and begs Touya to use teleportation magic to rescue his imprisoned mother.
20	8	"Two Princes and the Small Fiancée"; Transliteration: "Ninin no Oji, Soshite Chīsana Konyakusha." (Japanese: 二人の王子、そして小さな婚約者。)	May 22, 2023
Cloud reveals Wardack is the true power in Linhea, even controlling the king, and has imprisoned Cloud’s mother to ensure Zabune inherits the throne. Duke Ortlinde summons the leaders of all western kingdoms to discuss removing Wardack and Zabune from power and instating Cloud in their place, though in the end, they leave everything to the exasperated Touya. Using an invisibility spell, Touya infiltrates Linhea and confirms Zabune is a scumbag who keeps female slaves and Wardack plans to start a war with Palouf kingdom to have Cloud killed and enslave Sue after she marries Zabune. Touya quickly rescues a slave girl that Zabune recently acquired and removes her collar. Wardack and Zabune attempt to have the slave killed for trying to escape by crushing the collar, unaware that it's not on her anymore. Touya then rescues Cloud’s mother Erya and teleports her to safety, along with Koupe, Linhea’s former Prime Minister whom Cloud trusts. Touya then records Wardack confessing that he is actually Zabune’s real father, having seduced Zabune’s evil mother Queen Dacia, and plans to assassinate Cloud and the King to replace them as the new royal family. Touya reveals everything to Linhea’s king and later to the public using his phone's projection function; the king immediately declares Cloud his sole heir and retires to be with Erya. As king, Cloud has Wardack, Dacia, and Zabune sentenced to death, then secretly sold to a foreign slave trader who sends then to work as slaves in Sandora. Koupe is reinstated as Prime Minister and banishes all nobles who supported Wardack. Cloud joins Touya on the Alliance of Western Nations. Sue is happy she gets to marry Touya.
21	9	"Day-Off Dates and the Female Knight"; Transliteration: "Kyūjitsu dēto to on'na kishi" (Japanese: 休日デートと女騎士)	May 29, 2023
Touya attends the wedding of Olga and Lyon, causing him to realize he will soon have to attend his own six weddings. Yumina demands Touya take everyone on dates since he is often busy and neglects them for long periods. Touya takes them shopping and to the theatre, with a short stop to arrest some bandits. Returning home, they realize they forgot to include Sue, who demands her own date alone with Touya. He takes her on a tour of Brunhild where his citizens are happily settling in. Flora completes the Ether Liquid, allowing the Frame Gears to activate. At Touya’s suggestion, Rosetta uses crystal from dead Phrases to make weapons that, like the Phrase themselves, grow stronger the more magic is put into them. Rosetta requests Orichalcum to build more Frames, so Touya hunts for an Orichalcum Golem, though as he flies over Lestia Kingdom, he sees it under attack by numerous Phrases. After destroying them with his crystal sword, he meets Lestia’s knight princess Hildegard and impulsively gives her several crystal swords to promote diplomatic relations and so that she can stand a chance against the Phrase. After finally hunting his golem, Touya discovers a girl in the woods missing a hand and a leg from a vicious attack.
22	10	"Amnesia and the Mystic Eye of Petrification"; Transliteration: "Kioku Sōshitsu, Soshite Ishika no Mame." (Japanese: 記憶喪失、そして石化の魔眼。)	June 5, 2023
Flora restores the missing limbs of the girl Touya found with the Alchemy Lab, but reports she has amnesia. Touya temporarily names her Sakura for her pink hair. Sakura turns out to be an excellent singer, so Touya shows her the piano, hoping music will jog her memory, but Sakura remains amnesiac. The guild sends Touya after a Catoblepas, a monster that can turn people to stone. Thirteen adventurers have already turned to stone, so Touya accepts, hoping Null healing can save the adventurers. His fiancées, except Leen and Sue, insist on joining him, so he replaces their normal weaponry with Phrase crystal replacements. The Catoblepas is defeated without casualties, except for Lucia, who is stoned up to her waist. She recovers through Null healing, but when the stone crumbles, it shreds her clothes, leaving her without panties. A second Catoblepas appears, though luckily it is killed without Touya seeing Lucia exposed. Unfortunately, when Touya naively heals the thirteen adventurers’ too quickly, he ends up with thirteen men and women totally naked. Touya gives a Frame Gear to every kingdom as a gift. In Lestia, Hildegard hopes to see Touya again. Her grandfather Galen, reputed to have been as strong as Touya in his youth, becomes interested in Touya as well as his advanced technology.
23	11	"Sister From Another World and a Sparkling First Love"; Transliteration: "Isekai no Ane, Soshite Hatsukoi Kirakira." (Japanese: 異世界の姉、そして初恋キラキラ。)	June 12, 2023
Touya oversees construction of his personal Frame Gear, Night-Baron. Love Goddess appears in person, claiming to be Touya’s sister Karen, so she can have fun observing his relationships in person. Not quite coincidentally, Hildegard visits with Galen. Galen is impressed with the crystal swords that Touya gave them earlier along with his intentions to share the Frame Gears between kingdoms, so he decides to convince his son, Lestia’s current king, to join the Alliance of Western Nations. After having a friendly duel with Yae, Hildegard is clearly disappointed Touya has six fiancées already, but after some meddling by Love Goddess, asks to become his seventh fiancé. Galen is unconvinced and demands a duel, though not with Touya but with Hildegard, to prove her resolve. Hildegard is accepted onto the Council of Brides but worries she may not defeat Galen, though the fiancé’s are certain Touya has a plan. Touya does indeed, knowing Galen is a lecher, he distracts him during the duel with a holographic projection of a bikini clad woman. Hildegard wins, but the fiancées demand to know why Touya has bikini pictures. Hildegard is curious about Touya’s parents who no one has met (unaware that he isn’t from this world), though Love Goddess assures them Touya will tell them when he is ready. She then thrills the fiancé’s with Touya’s embarrassing childhood stories and prevents Kohaku from alerting Touya.
24	12	"Birth of a Prince and With My Smartphone"; Transliteration: "Oji Tanjō, Soshite Sumātofon Totomo ni." (Japanese: 王子誕生、そしてスマートフォンとともに。)	June 19, 2023
Kougyouko locates the Rampart and Tower Islands and their keepers Preliora and Pamela. The Tower is the center of the islands and functions as a magic generator, while the Rampart can generate a magical shield. Preliora hints Professor Babylon foresaw Touya’s future. Queen Yuel gives birth to a boy, replacing Touya as Belfast’s future king. Touya names the boy Yamato. The baby makes the fiancés realize they will likely have children in a few years. The keepers confirm the Professor foresaw Touya’s nine wives having at least one child each, corresponding with there being nine Babylon islands. Touya is baffled that he hasn’t even met his next two wives yet. He unsuccessfully tries to conceal the information from his fiancés and they decide to punish him for trying to hide it like an extramarital affair and sentence him to kiss each of them, much to his anguish. At a party to celebrate Yamato’s birth, the group watch from the castle balcony. Yumina impulsively kisses Touya early, causing Linze to kiss him too and Touya just kisses Sue on the cheek. Lucia runs away embarrassed and Hildegard faints. Yae kisses him but panics and beats him up. Elze kisses him as well and also beats him up. Afterwards, Elze helps Touya up and the wives all smile at Touya and they continue watching the fireworks. The keepers locate the Professor's future sensing Clairvoyance Gem and discover the other two wives will be Leen and Sakura.
