= All Saints Street =

Chinese webcomic

- Author: Lingzi
- Current status/schedule: Finished
- Publisher: Bilibili
- Genre(s): Comedy, slice of life

All Saints Street (Chinese: 万圣街; pinyin: Wan Sheng Jie; lit. 'Holies' Street'), alternately known as All Saints Street: 1031 and 1031 All Saints Street, is a Chinese webcomic written and illustrated by the artist Lingzi. The slice of life series follows a group of mythological beings who share an apartment in modern China. All Saints Street has been published on Bilibili since 2016, and was adapted into a donghua web series by Tencent Video. The first two seasons were released in 2020 with a third in 2022, and a fourth season that aired in 2023. The donghua was internationally released by Crunchyroll in November 2022 with a Japanese-language dub.

== Synopsis ==
The series is set in a fictionalized version of Earth where humans, deities, and demons co-exist peacefully. Neil "Nini" Bowman, a demon who is fascinated by humans, runs away from home to live in the human world. Despite his desire to integrate himself with humans, he ultimately finds himself sharing an apartment with other mythological beings.

== Characters ==
Neil "Nini" Bowman
Voiced by: Haiquing Xia (Chinese), Daiki Yamashita (Japanese)
A demon who moves from Hell to live in the human world. Considered too kind for demon culture, which brought him bullying from both peers and his half brother Nick, with whom Neil has a fraught relationship. Loves animals of all kinds, even if they do not like him back.

Ira Blood
Voiced by: Xin Teng (Chinese), Jun Fukuyama (Japanese)
Neil's roommate. A vampire from an aristocratic family who ran away from home, and now lives as an unkempt slacker.

Lynn Angel
Voiced by: Xianghai Hao (Chinese), Kaito Ishikawa (Japanese)
Neil's landlord. An angel with a stern but kind demeanor. Lily Angel's brother, and an English teacher in Beijing.

Vladimir Elliot Kirilenko
Voiced by: Yanzhe Du (Chinese), Tomoaki Maeno (Japanese)
A werewolf who lives in 1031. The webcomic version has him be one of the original flatmates with Abu and Ira, as well as a computer programmer. In the animated version, he becomes Neil's roommate after being sent by the World Werewolf Association to monitor him. Because of his long name, he is nicknamed Damao (lit. "long hair") by his roommates.

Abu
Voiced by: Xianghai Hao (seasons 1-2), Peng Sun (season 3) (Chinese), Shun Horie (Japanese)
Neil's roommate. A mummy who never speaks, and is typically only seen in the background. Is often able to reanimate animals, one of whom continues to live with him.

Lily Angel
Voiced by: Yanyan Xi (Chinese), Marika Kono (Japanese)
Lynn's younger sister, whom Neil develops a crush on. Adores Lynn and sees him as a role model. Aspiring artist.

Nick Hoult
Voiced by: Zhang Zhen (Chinese), Yuichi Nakamura (Japanese)
Neil's older half-brother. A salesman of Hell and a bit of a bully.

Evan Angel
Voiced by: Yang Xinran (Chinese), Kensho Ono (Japanese)
Lily's close friend, whom Neil is jealous of.

Luis Bite
Voiced by: Hu Lian (Chinese), Ryōhei Kimura (Japanese)
Neil's roommate. An American zombie and aspiring actor.

Momo
Voiced by: Hei Te (Chinese), Miyuki Sawashiro (Japanese)
An alcoholic Nekomata and former J-pop idol who lives next door.

Crystal
Voiced by: Zhifou Liu (Chinese)
Momo and Nick's friend. A Swedish unicorn now working as an exorcist.

== Episodes ==
=== Series overview ===
Series	Episodes	Originally released	
Series	Episodes	First released	Last released
1	12	1 April 2020	27 May 2020
2	12	14 October 2020	30 December 2020
3	12	26 January 2022	13 April 2022
4	12	5 July 2023	16 July 2023

=== Season 1 (2020) ===
No. overall	No. in season	Title ^{[a]}	Original release date	Crunchyroll air date
1	1	"Nice to Meet You, I'm Ni-Ni"	1 April 2020	11 November 2022
2	2	"Friend Coming From Afar, Would You Like to Move In?"	1 April 2020	11 November 2022
3	3	"The Angelic Landlord and His Nice Tenants"	1 April 2020	11 November 2022
4	4	"The Lone Wolf Who Came From the North"	1 April 2020	11 November 2022
5	5	"Fortune is Few, And Tragedy Never Far"	8 April 2020	11 November 2022
6	6	"Neil! Let's Get a Part-Time Job!"	15 April 2020	11 November 2022
7	7	"The Demon King Observation Journal"	22 April 2020	18 November 2022
8	8	"The Werewolf Observation Journal"	29 April 2020	18 November 2022
9	9	"Let's Spend Christmas Together"	6 May 2020	18 November 2022
10	10	"Lily Fluttered Down From Heaven"	13 May 2020	18 November 2022
11	11	"My Friend Has a Crush"	20 May 2020	18 November 2022
12	12	"Happy New Year! Happy New Year! Everyone, HNY!"	27 May 2020	18 November 2022

=== Season 2 (2020) ===
No. overall	No. in season	Title	Original release date	Crunchyroll air date
13	1	"A Roaring Sound Echoes in the Sky, Big Brother Makes His Galant Entrance"	14 October 2020	25 November 2022
14	2	"Even Superiors Have Others Above Them"	21 October 2020	25 November 2022
15	3	"Big Brothers Make Big Sacrifices for Little Brothers"	28 October 2020	25 November 2022
16	4	"Don't Carelessly Eat Snacks With Someone's Name Written on Them"	4 November 2020	25 November 2022
17	5	"Do Not Worry About Scarcity, but Rather About Uneven Distribution"	11 November 2020	25 November 2022
18	6	"Work With The Land You Have, and You'll Turn Trash Into Treasure"	18 November 2020	25 November 2022
19	7	"The Summer Without Love"	25 November 2020	2 December 2022
20	8	"Like Brother, Like Father"	2 December 2020	2 December 2022
21	9	"Be Sure to Check the Weather Forecast Before Going on a Picnic"	9 December 2020	2 December 2022
22	10	"The Entire Production Budget Was Used in the Making of This Episode"	16 December 2020	2 December 2022
23	11	"The Entire Production Budget Was Used For Last Episode and This One"	23 December 2020	2 December 2022
24	12	"Oh, Goodbye My Friend"	30 December 2020	2 December 2022

=== Season 3 (2022) ===
No. overall	No. in season	Title	Original release date	Crunchyroll air date
25	1	"Friends of Friends are Friends of Mine?"	26 January 2022	9 December 2022
26	2	"Horror Night on All Saints Street"	2 February 2022	9 December 2022
27	3	"No Room for a Homeless Kid"	9 February 2022	9 December 2022
28	4	"No One Escapes an Arranged Marriage"	16 February 2022	9 December 2022
29	5	"Kitten on the Street, Don't Run Around on Your Own"	23 February 2022	9 December 2022
30	6	"The Angel is Watching You"	2 March 2022	9 December 2022
31	7	"Work, Wolf, Work as Hard as You Can!"	9 March 2022	16 December 2022
32	8	"How Much More Charm Do You Have Left to Hide?"	16 March 2022	16 December 2022
33	9	"Happy Birthday, I Wish You Happiness"	23 March 2022	16 December 2022
34	10	"Battle of the Tennis Court"	30 March 2022	16 December 2022
35	11	"The Curtain Rises and the Spotlight Shines"	6 April 2022	16 December 2022
36	12	"Make You Feel My Love"	13 April 2022	16 December 2022

=== Season 4 (2023) ===
No. overall	No. in season	Title ^{[b]}	Original release date
37	1	"My Sister Suddenly Went Through a Huge Personality Change, What Should I Do?"	5 July 2023
38	2	"Before You Go on a Trip, Don't Forget to Check Out the Main Attractions"	6 July 2023
39	3	"Even the Powerful Have No Chance Against a Local Boss"	7 July 2023
40	4	"There Are Some Places That You Only Need to Visit Once, Right?"	8 July 2023
41	5	"Ira's Kid Brother and Sister Can't Possibly Be This Cute"	9 July 2023
42	6	"Evil Spirit, Evil Spirit, Be Gone!"	10 July 2023
43	7	"The Scenery Before You When You're Lost"	11 July 2023
44	8	"Good Nick, Bad Nick"	12 July 2023
45	9	"Everyone Is Sure to Be Rewarded One Day"	13 July 2023
46	10	"I Was Reborn, and Now I'm a CEO?"	14 July 2023
47	11	"Traffic Accident? Amnesia? Let's Shoot for the Top in Life?"	15 July 2023
48	12	"How Can I Save You? My Angel..."	16 July 2023

== Media ==
All Saints Street was originally published as a webcomic on the video sharing website Bilibili, where it has been serialized since 2016. In 2020, the series was adapted into an animated web series produced by Tencent Video and FENZ animation (Numerator), and animated by Hanmu Chunhua (HMCH). Season 1 aired from April to May 2020, and Season 2 aired October to December of the same year. Season 3 aired from January to April 2022, and a Season 4 was announced in December 2022 with a release date of 2023.

A Japanese-language dubbed version of the series was announced in March 2022 and premiered 13 November 2022. The main cast was announced in July 2022. In addition, the Japanese release included a Japanese version of the opening theme performed by CeVIO AI, and an original ending theme titled "mawari mawaru" (まわりまわる) performed by Sasanomaly. It is being simulcast on Crunchyroll, and distributed by Aniplex of America in the United States. The series received DVD and Blu-ray releases from February to April 2023.

== Reception ==
As of March 2022, the series has exceeded 200 million views on Tencent Video.

== Notes ==
a.All English titles are taken from Crunchyroll.
b.All English titles are taken from MyAnimeList.
