= Shiro Project:RE =

- Publisher: DMM Games
- Platforms: PC (HTML 5); Android OS iOS
- Release: JP: 11 November 2014; (Shiro Pro): JP: 29 March 2016; (Shiro Pro: RE)
- Genres: social simulation game tower defense

Shiro Project:RE (Japanese: 御城プロジェクト:RE, Hepburn: Oshiro Project:RE, lit. "Castle Project"), often abbreviated as ShiroPro:RE, is a web browser game on DMM.com made by DMM Games. Players control "castle girls" and defend against an enemy force who attack Japan from the sky at the end of the Sengoku Period. In the game, castle girls are moe personifications of feudal castles born from the peoples strong desire for peace.

ShiroPro:RE was a relaunch of DMM Games' other title, Shiro Project. Shiro Project was published on 11 November 2014, but was suspended on 25 April 2015 for various reasons until it was relaunched in 2016 as Shiro Project:RE. At the time of server migration, players could keep some of their in-game items such as castle daughters, equipment, and for-purchase expanded facilities from the original Shiro Project servers. Distribution on Android began Wednesday, 1 June 2016.

== Gameplay ==
Gameplay is centered on tower defense featuring different battlefield maps in which the player ("lord" in the game) protects various strongholds from enemy "helmets" (兜, kabuto), a mysterious force who come from the sky. Players place collectible units called "castle daughters" (城娘, shiro musume) onto the battlefield to disrupt the flow of invading helmet forces in order to prevent the fall of their stronghold, which happens when enemies reach the lord and reduce their health to 0. Castle daughters are moe personifications of historical castles.

The dialogue and illustrations of each castle girl were designed to reflect the background and history of the castle and surrounding regions they're based on.

== See also ==
- Kantai Collection
- Girls' Frontline
