= Miyabi =

Traditional Japanese aesthetic ideal

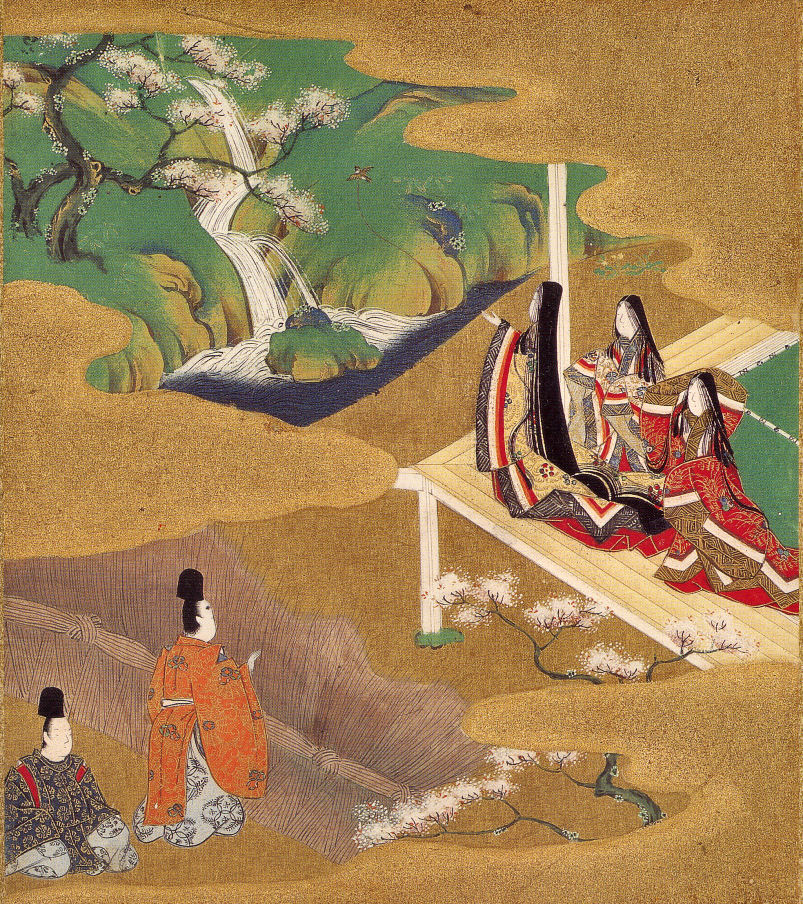
Art of Miyabi on the Heian period. The Tale of Genji

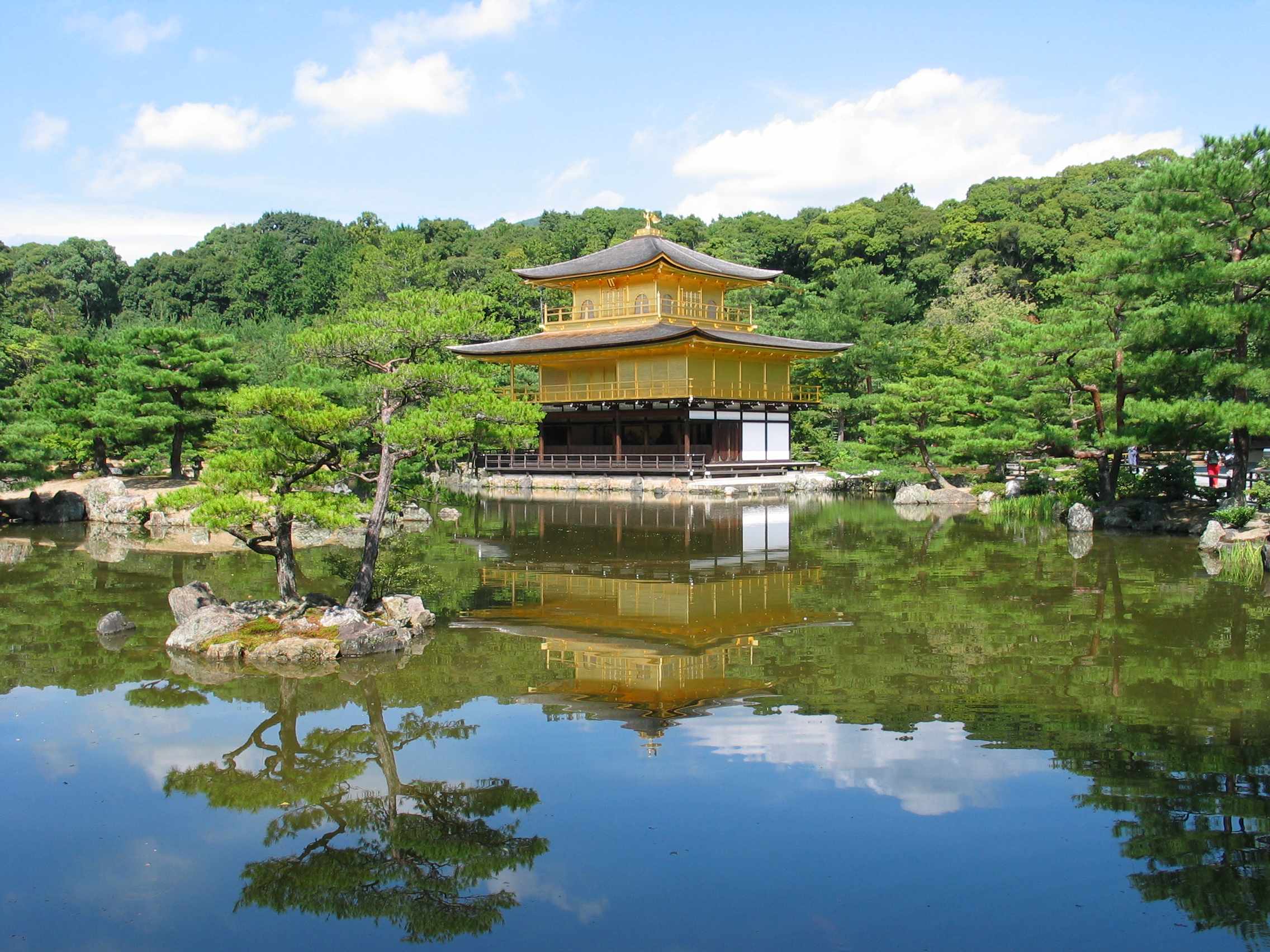
Art of Miyabi on the Muromachi period. (Kinkaku-ji in Kyoto)

Miyabi (雅) is one of the traditional Japanese aesthetic ideals, though not as prevalent as Iki or Wabi-sabi. In modern Japanese, the word is usually translated as "elegance," "refinement," or "courtliness" and sometimes to a "sweet loved one".

The ideal posed by the word demanded the elimination of anything that was absurd or vulgar and the "polishing of manners, diction, and feelings to eliminate all roughness and crudity so as to achieve the highest grace." It expressed that sensitivity to beauty which was the hallmark of the Heian era. Miyabi is often closely connected to the notion of Mono no aware, a bittersweet awareness of the transience of things, and thus it was thought that things in decline showed a great sense of miyabi. An example of this would be one of a lone cherry tree. The tree would soon lose its flowers and would be stripped of everything that made it beautiful and so it showed not only mono no aware, but also miyabi in the process.

Adherents to the ideals of miyabi strove to rid the world of crude forms or aesthetics and emotions that were common in artworks of the period, such as those contained in the Man'yōshū, the oldest extant collection of Japanese poetry. The Man'yōshū contained poems by people of every walk of life, many of which stood in stark contrast to the sensibilities of miyabi. For example, one poem in the collection likened a woman's hair to snail innards. The ideals of miyabi stood firmly against the use of metaphors such as this. Furthermore, appreciation of miyabi and its ideal was used as a marker of class differences. It was believed that only members of the upper class, the courtiers, could truly appreciate the workings of miyabi.

Miyabi in fact limited how art and poems could be created. Miyabi tried to stay away from the rustic and crude, and in doing so, prevented the traditionally trained courtiers from expressing real feelings in their works. In later years, miyabi and its aesthetic were replaced by the ideals of Higashiyama culture, such as Wabi-sabi, Yuugen, Iki and so on.

The characters of the classic eleventh-century Japanese novel "The Tale of Genji" by Lady Murasaki provide examples of miyabi.
