= List of Yuki Yuna Is a Hero episodes =

Yuki Yuna Is a Hero is a Japanese anime television series directed by Seiji Kishi and produced by Studio Gokumi. The series follows a girl named Yuna Yuki who, along with her fellow members in her school's Hero Club, becomes an actual hero tasked with fighting an evil race known as the Vertex. The series was broadcast in Japan from October 17 to December 26, 2014, and was simulcast worldwide by Crunchyroll. In North America, the series is licensed by PonyCan USA, and it was released on Blu-ray/DVD in April 2015. The opening theme is "Hoshi to Hana" (ホシトハナ, Star and Flower) and the ending theme is "Aurora Days"; both are performed by Sanshū Chūgaku Yūsha-bu (Haruka Terui, Suzuko Mimori, Yumi Uchiyama, Tomoyo Kurosawa, and Juri Nagatsuma). The ending theme for episode four (acoustic version) and episode nine is "Inori no Uta" (祈りの歌, Song of Prayer) by Tomoyo Kurosawa.

A second season aired in Japan between October 7, 2017, and January 6, 2018, and was simulcast by Anime Strike. The season is split into two parts; Washio Sumi's Chapter, which adapts the Washio Sumi is a Hero prequel light novel series, and Heroes' Chapter, which takes place after the first season. Washio Sumi's Chapter was first released as three theatrical films between March 18 and July 8, 2017, before airing as six television episodes between October 7 and November 11, 2017, followed by a recap episode which aired on November 18, 2017. Heroes' Chapter consists of six television episodes and aired between November 25, 2017, and January 6, 2018. Both series were simulcast by Amazon Prime Video. For Washio Sumi's Chapter, the opening themes are "Sakiwafu Hana" (サキワフハナ, Flower of Happiness) for the film version and "Egao no Kimi e" (エガオノキミへ, To The Smiling You) for the television version, both performed by Suzuko Mimori. The ending themes are "Tomodachi" (ともだち, Friends) by Mimori, Kana Hanazawa, and Yumiri Hanamori for the first film, "Tamashii" (たましい, Spirit) by Hanamori for the second film, and "Yakusoku" (やくそく, Promise) by Mimori and Hanazawa for the third film. For Heroes' Chapter, the opening and ending themes respectively are "Hana Kotoba" (ハナコトバ, Flower Language) and "Yūshatachi no Lullaby" (勇者たちのララバイ, Lullaby of the Heroes), both performed by Sanshū Chūgaku Yūsha-bu (as above but with the addition of Hanazawa). Three short films by W-Toon Studio based on the Yuki Yuna wa Yūsha-bu Shozoku spin-off manga by Takahiro and Kotamaru were released alongside the Washio Sumi films.

A third anime season titled The Great Mankai Chapter (大満開の章, Dai-Mankai no Shō), which takes place during the events of the second season and adapts content from the Kusunoki Mebuki is a Hero and Nogi Wakaba is a Hero light novels, aired from October 2 to December 18, 2021, on MBS, TBS, and their affiliates and is being simulcast by Hidive. The main staff and cast members reprised their roles for the third season. The opening theme is "Ashita no Hanatachi" (アシタノハナタチ, "Tomorrow's Flowers"), while the ending theme is "Chiheisen no Mukō e" (地平線の向こうへ, "Beyond the Horizon"), both performed by Sanshū Chūgaku Yūsha-bu.

== Episode list ==
=== Season 1 (The Yuki Yuna Chapter) ===
No.	Title (Note: All English titles taken from Crunchyroll.)	Original release date
1	"A Maiden's True Heart"; Transliteration: "Otome no Magokoro" (Japanese: 乙女の真心)	October 17, 2014
On the island of Shikoku, Yuna Yuki, her best friend Mimori Togo, and sisters Fu and Itsuki Inubozaki, are all members of the Sanshu Middle School Hero Club, which is dedicated to helping those that request it via their website. During class one day, upon each receiving a strange 'forestize warning' message on their phones, the four girls find time has suddenly stopped around them before they are enveloped by a rainbow-colored light, soon finding themselves in a strange colorful forest. Fu, who had told the others to download a special app on their phones when they first joined the Hero Club, reveals that their club has been chosen by Shinju, the divine tree, to fight against mysterious enemies known as Vertex, whose goal is to destroy Shinju, killing the world as a result. When one of these Vertex appears and starts attacking, Fu tells Yuna and Mimori to escape while she and Itsuki use their phones to transform into heroes to fight against the Vertex. Determined to protect Mimori, Yuna awakens her potential as a hero and transforms herself, using her newfound strength to fight against the Vertex.
2	"Noble Thoughts"; Transliteration: "Rōtaketaru Omoi" (Japanese: ろうたけたる思い)	October 17, 2014
With the Vertex able to regenerate its wounds, Fu has Yuna and Itsuki perform a sealing ritual in order to destroy its core and defeat it, returning everyone to the real world. The next day, Fu explains that she was tasked by her organisation, the Taisha, to grant hero candidates the power to fight against the twelve Vertex that threaten Shinju. Mimori, frustrated that she couldn't help everyone during the battle, directs her anger at Fu for keeping things a secret from everyone, but Yuna manages to cheer up a little. The girls are soon brought into another battle as three more Vertex emerge, using combined attacks to keep them from performing the sealing ritual. When the Vertex start attacking Yuna, Mimori becomes determined to protect her and awakens her hero form, using long range attacks to provide support, and together they manage to defeat all three Vertex.
3	"Moral Poise"; Transliteration: "Fūkaku Aru Furumai" (Japanese: 風格ある振る舞い)	October 24, 2014
A month following their last encounter, the girls prepare to face off against the fifth Vertex, only for another hero named Karin Miyoshi to suddenly appear and defeat it single-handedly. The next day, Karin transfers into Yuna and Mimori's class, claiming herself to be a fully trained hero sent to supervise the newbies. She reluctantly joins the Hero Club, though is stubborn about becoming friends with the others. That weekend, as the girls plan to meet somewhere, Karin skips out on it, feeling she should not be led astray from her duty as a hero. Later that night, the girls show up at Karin's apartment, revealing they had planned to surprise her with a birthday party. At the end of the day, Karin is starting to get along with them.
4	"Shining Hearts"; Transliteration: "Kagayaku Kokoro" (Japanese: 輝く心)	October 31, 2014
Itsuki, who gets nervous when singing in front of others, is anxious about an upcoming test, so the Hero Club decide to go to karaoke to help boost her confidence. Meanwhile, Fu is unnerved by a message from Taisha telling her to expect the worst. As she continues to struggle with her nerves, Itsuki thinks about the burden placed on Fu, who has been looking after her ever since their parents died. Later, as Fu laments getting Itsuki involved with the Vertex, Itsuki assures her that she feels happy being able to fight alongside her. On the day of her test, Itsuki finds a letter from everyone encouraging her to do her best, allowing her to sing with confidence and giving her a goal of becoming a singer. Soon afterwards, as Fu contemplates the worst case scenario, another forestization appears.
5	"Overcoming Adversity"; Transliteration: "Konnan ni Uchikatsu" (Japanese: 困難に打ち勝つ)	November 7, 2014
Facing up against all seven of the remaining Vertex, the girls start to fight against the first one, only to be caught in a trap by another, who uses a loud bell to disable them. Itsuki manages to stop the bell, but then three Vertexes merge to form a single more powerful Vertex, proving resilient to their attacks. Not willing to give up, Fu and Mimori use their trump card, the Mankai form, to defeat the combined Vertex, while Itsuki uses her Mankai form to stop a smaller, faster Vertex from reaching Shinju. Fu then risks herself to buy time for the others to seal the remaining Vertex, whose core is discovered to be a massive one positioned in the stratosphere. Yuna and Mimori head to space together in order to fight against the core, using their Mankai forms to destroy it. Following the battle, Karin is relieved to find everyone alive and well and reports their victory to Taisha.
6	"In Anticipation of Tomorrow"; Transliteration: "Ashita ni Kitai shite" (Japanese: 明日に期待して)	November 14, 2014
After receiving checkups at the hospital following their battle against the Vertex, Fu is revealed to have lost some vision in her left eye while Itsuki has lost her voice, both of which they assume to be temporary symptoms caused by battle fatigue. However, upon discovering Yuna has also lost her sense of taste and that she herself has gone deaf in her left ear, Mimori fears that these symptoms could be a side-effect of the Mankai form and gets in touch with Fu about it. Meanwhile, Karin, who hasn't been affected since she didn't use the Mankai form, has been avoiding going to the clubroom, as she fears she no longer has any purpose now that the Vertex are gone. However, Yuna manages to find her and convince her that, even with no-one to fight, the Hero Club will still carry on like it always has. Touched by Yuna's friendship, Karin convinces Taisha to let her stay at Sanshu Middle School until graduation, while the girls make plans for summer break.
7	"Idyllic Happiness"; Transliteration: "Bokkateki na Yorokobi" (Japanese: 牧歌的な喜び)	November 21, 2014
Taisha rewards the girls with an all-expenses-paid trip to a hot spring inn during their summer break. The girls enjoy a day on the beach, have a delicious meal, relax in the hot springs, and tell some ghost stories. The next morning, Mimori reminisces about a ribbon she was holding onto when she lost her memory in an accident and wonders if their battles are really over. After the group returns home, making plans for the culture festival on the way back, Fu is summoned to the clubroom where she discovers everyone's old transformation cellphones, as well as a new fairy for herself, with Taisha warning her that another attack is to be expected.
8	"Blessings of the Gods"; Transliteration: "Kami no Shukufuku" (Japanese: 神の祝福)	November 28, 2014
After Fu informs the others that their battle isn't over yet, with each girl besides Karin receiving an additional fairy, the girls soon come up against another forestization. Discovering the remaining Vertex, finding it to be overflowing with cores, Yuna quickly disposes of them using the power of her new fairy, causing some worry amongst her friends. When the forest disappears, Yuna and Mimori end up separated from the others, having been summoned by a hospitalized girl, who reveals herself to be a former hero named Sonoko Nogi. Sonoko reveals to them the secret of the Hero System, in which heroes permanently lose the use of a bodily function in exchange for the power granted by the Mankai form, further revealing that heroes are effectively sacrifices to Shinju who can never die. On top of the shock both girls feel upon hearing this, Mimori is also saddened as she seems to know Sonoko, but is unable to remember her.
9	"Those Who Know Grief"; Transliteration: "Kokoro no Itami o Wakaru Hito" (Japanese: 心の痛みを判る人)	December 5, 2014
Yuna and Mimori relay what they've learned from Sonoko to Fu, who asks them not to tell Itsuki and Karin until they know for certain. Despite hearing from Itsuki's homeroom teacher how Itsuki has been suffering due to her missing voice, Fu remains in denial, hoping that things will eventually get better. The next day, however, Mimori reveals to Yuna and Fu that their fairies were actually created to prevent them from dying, even by suicide, proving that everything Sonoko said to them was true and that their symptoms are permanent. This leads Fu to become distressed, knowing that Itsuki's voice will never return and she will never achieve her dream of becoming a singer. Angered by having gotten everyone involved, Fu seeks to destroy the Taisha, even preparing to battle her way through Karin to this end. However, Yuna and Itsuki stop her from fighting, showing her they have no regrets joining the Hero Club.
10	"Bonds of Love"; Transliteration: "Aijō no Kizuna" (Japanese: 愛情の絆)	December 12, 2014
Mimori recalls the events following the loss of her memories, including her first meeting with Yuna and how they came to join the Hero Club. Having discovered her legs and memory were lost as a result of the Mankai form when she was a hero before, and that everything from her standard of living to moving near Yuna was arranged by Taisha, Mimori once again approaches Sonoko, who tells her the true nature of the world. Long ago, when some gods sent the Vertexes to cleanse the world, other gods merged into the Shinju and formed a barrier around Shikoku to protect mankind. Mimori flies to the barrier and crosses it to discover a hellish landscape outside filled with smaller Vertexes known as Stardusts rebuilding the Vertexes that were already defeated, dooming the heroes to continue battling until they become completely disabled. Not wanting the others to suffer like Sonoko did, Mimori believes the only solution is to destroy Shinju, and thereby what is left of the world, and blasts a hole in the barrier, unleashing countless Stardusts into the forest.
11	"Passion"; Transliteration: "Jōnetsu" (Japanese: 情熱)	December 19, 2014
Learning Mimori is at the center of the Vertex outbreak, Yuna and Karin chase after her into the barrier, learning what Mimori herself had learned. Before they can try to reason with Mimori, who believes destroying the Shinju is the only way to spare her friends from suffering, Yuna and Karin are forced to retreat from the Stardusts. Yuna's confusion over the matter leaves her unable to transform into a hero, believing herself to be a failure as a friend. Wanting to fulfil Yuna's desire to stop Mimori and be together again, Karin goes off on her own to fight through the Stardusts standing between her and Mimori, undergoing Mankai multiple times in the process. As a result of the battle, Karin becomes blind and deaf and loses control of her right limbs by the time Yuna finds her. Meanwhile, after Fu and Itsuki fail to stop her, Mimori attempts to destroy Shinju by luring the Vertex's attack towards it, but the attack is stopped in its tracks by Yuna, who is determined to protect Mimori.
12	"Smile At You"; Transliteration: "Anata ni Hohoemu" (Japanese: 貴方に微笑む)	December 26, 2014
Yuna is forced to fight against Mimori, who can't bear to lose her memories of everyone like she did with Sonoko, or be forgotten about herself. However, Yuna states her determined feelings to never forget about Mimori and manages to stop her. With the Vertex's final attack headed for Shinju, all of the girls, despite the afflictions caused by their Mankai forms, band together to block the attack, with Yuna delivering the final blow just in time, after which their fairies disappear, ending their role as heroes. After the battle, each of the girls start to slowly recover what they have lost, including Mimori's use of her legs and Itsuki's voice, but Yuna has remained in a coma-like state as a result of her efforts. Visiting her every day, Mimori feels overcome with guilt over what happened, but her voice soon reaches Yuna, who awakens once again. Finally able to perform their long-awaited hero play, Yuna feels confident that she can accomplish anything with her fellow heroes by her side.

=== Season 2 ===
==== The Washio Sumi Chapter ====
No.	Title (Note: English episode titles taken from Amazon Prime Video.)	Original release date
1	"Sumi Washio"; Transliteration: "Washio Sumi" (Japanese: わしおすみ)	October 7, 2017
Elementary school students Sumi Washio, Sonoko Nogi, and Gin Minowa are all chosen as heroes to protect the Shinju from the Vertex. Thrust into their first battle against a water-based Vertex, the girls initially struggle to attack it, but soon manage to push it back with teamwork and guts. Following their narrow victory, Sumi works up the courage to ask Sonoko and Gin to be her friends.
2	"Friends"; Transliteration: "Tomodachi" (Japanese: ともだち)	October 14, 2017
Half a month later, after the girls beat their second Vertex, they are sent on a training camp to build their teamwork. Later, Sumi and Sonoko follow Gin as she winds up helping a lot of strangers, when the third Vertex suddenly appears. As the girls manage to work together to defeat it, Sumi laments that, contrary to her own beliefs, she was the one faltering behind everyone and swears to become stronger.
3	"Daily Life"; Transliteration: "Nichijō" (Japanese: にちじょう)	October 21, 2017
Given a break from their training, the girls take some time off, during which they talk about their dreams and prepare a special presentation for the freshmen's orientation.
4	"Spirit"; Transliteration: "Tamashii" (Japanese: たましい)	October 28, 2017
While returning from a school trip, the girls fight against two more Vertexes, only for Sumi and Sonoko to get heavily injured when a third one appears as well. Being the only one left able to move, Gin faces the Vertexes herself and manages to defeat them but is killed in the process, leaving Sumi and Sonoko devastated.
5	"Goodbye"; Transliteration: "Sayōnara" (Japanese: さようなら)	November 4, 2017
With Gin's death weighing heavily on their minds, Sumi and Sonoko are forced to fight another Vertex in the middle of Gin's funeral. Wanting to cheer Sonoko up, Sumi invites her to a festival where they reaffirm their friendship. Later, Sumi and Sonoko receive fairy partners as part of a new hero system, the details of which are only told to their parents.
6	"Promise"; Transliteration: "Yakusoku" (Japanese: やくそく)	November 11, 2017
Dragged into another battle against three more Vertexes, the girls take advantage of their new abilities and use the power of Mankai to defeat two of them. However, Sumi then discovers she has lost the use of her legs while Sonoko has gone blind in one eye. Despite concern over these inflictions, the girls continue to use Mankai to stop the remaining Vertex from attacking the bridge. After managing to destroy the Vertex's main body, Sonoko follows its core through a barrier, where she witnesses the previously defeated Vertex being resurrected. Sonoko further discovers that her heart has stopped beating but is somehow still alive, while Sumi no longer possesses any memory of her as a result of her second Mankai. Realising that she is no longer capable of dying, Sonoko undergoes Mankai countless more times to protect Sumi from the resurrecting Vertex. Some time later, Sumi, now going under her original name of Mimori Togo, moves into a new home and is befriended by her new neighbor, Yuna Yuki.
7	"A Sunny Place"; Transliteration: "Hidamari" (Japanese: ひだまり)	November 18, 2017
Mimori recalls the events of the Yuki Yuna Chapter, in which she once again became a hero and fought alongside Yuna and her friends as a member of the Hero Club.

==== The Hero Chapter ====
No.	Title	Original release date
1	"Brilliant Days"; Transliteration: "Hanayaka na Hibi" (Japanese: 華やかな日々)	November 25, 2017 (Note: A recap of the first season, titled "Sunny Spot" (ひだまり, Hidamari), aired on November 18, 2017.)
Following their battle against the Vertex, Yuna, Fu, Itsuki, and Karin are joined by a fully recovered Sonoko as the Hero Club resumes its normal activities. However, Yuna starts to get a strange feeling that someone is missing from the equation. The next day, upon experiencing more deja vu, both Yuna and Sonoko come to the realization that someone has altered their memories to make them forget all about Mimori, as if she never existed. Upon recalling their true memories of Mimori, who had been taking up a masked hero persona to make up for her sins, the girls are left with the question of where she has disappeared to.
2	"Precious Memories"; Transliteration: "Taisetsu na Omoide" (Japanese: 大切な思い出)	December 2, 2017
Suspecting Mimori may be somewhere behind the wall, Sonoko brings together everyone's transformation cellphones, containing a new Hero System that won't affect their body functions but instead ties the barrier that protects the Heroes to the Mankai Gauge. The more the barrier is used, the lower the Mankai gauge becomes. If the Mankai gauge empties completely the barrier will be lost, and entering Mankai will instantly empty the gauge. Once again transforming into heroes, the girls venture beyond the wall and detect Mimori's signal coming from a mysterious black hole. Using Sonoko's Mankai form as a ship, Yuna ventures into the black hole while the others hold off the pursuing Vertex. Expending her barrier to survive the hole's gravity, Yuna's spirit becomes separated from her body, during which she discovers fragments of Mimori's memories. Due to her actions causing flames to leak out of the hole in the boundary she left, Mimori agreed to be a ritual sacrifice in order to suppress the flames, having Shinju rewrite the memories of Yuna and the others so they wouldn't go after her. Yuna soon finds Mimori trapped in a construct with a sprit surrounded in flames. Despite the risk to her own spirit and body, Yuna pulls Mimori out of the construct, taking on the full extent of her curse. As Mimori is safely returned to the real world with the flames stabilized, Yuna keeps secret the marks now embedded in her body.
3	"My Heart Aches When I Think of You"; Transliteration: "Anata o Omou to Mune ga Itamu" (Japanese: あなたを思うと胸が痛む)	December 9, 2017
As the Hero Club prepares to celebrate Christmas together, Yuna is burdened by the "duty" she took on from Mimori when she rescued her. As Yuna wonders if she should speak to the others about it, she starts to see visions of the same mark appearing on the others. The next day, Yuna learns all of them have suffered minor misfortunes. Itsuki loses the house key, stranding her and Fu outside on a cold night, the heater at Karin's house breaks, Togo suffers a power outage at her home, and Sonoko burns her hand on a hot kettle. Later that day, after Yuna tries to talk to her about the mark, Fu is hit by a car despite her spirit's attempt to protect her. This leads Yuna to realize her curse is causing anyone she tries to talk to the mark about to have accidents, leaving her at a loss over what to do.
4	"Concealed Intentions"; Transliteration: "Himeta Ishi" (Japanese: 秘めた意志)	December 16, 2017
As the new year settles in and Fu is discharged from hospital, Yuna tries to continue her ordinary life without letting on about her situation. Karin notices something off about Yuna's behavior and tries to ask her about it, becoming upset when Yuna refuses to tell her. Also noticing something amiss about Yuna, Mimori sneaks into her home and discovers a book of Hero Records that she had been writing in. As Mimori shows this book to the others, Sonocchi reveals that Yuna is being tormented by the Curse of the Gods, which will spread to others if she writes or tells others about it. Deciding to read the book anyway, the girls learn that due to the damage she had taken during their final battle against the Vertex, Yuna received a new body from Shinju that, because of the curse she has taken on, will probably not last until the spring. Further learning that Yuna has faced more fear and pain as her condition worsened, Karin reveals remorse for the harsh words she said to her while Mimori becomes determined to save Yuna.
5	"Pure Hearts"; Transliteration: "Seiren na Kokoro" (Japanese: 清廉な心)	December 23, 2017
The Taisha informs Yuna that the Shinju will soon wither and die, leading to the destruction of the human race, unless she agrees to sacrifice herself in a Shinkon marriage to the Shinju. Feeling her life is coming to an end anyway, Yuna agrees to take part in the Shinkon but is met with fierce objection from her friends. Becoming further stressed and desperate in arguing over what should be done, she becomes fearful that the curse in her friends is spreading and runs away. While searching for Yuna, the girls are summoned by a member of Taisha, recognized by Mimori and Sonoko as their old master Aki, who affirms Yuna participating in the Shinkon is the only way to save humanity. With the Shinkon, humans will ascend to a divine level, leaving behind their humanity to live with the Shinju. As Yuna prepares to undergo the Shinkon, a large enemy appears in the real world, which Aki asks the heroes to hold back until the Shinkon is complete.
6	"I Am Happy for You Are With Me"; Transliteration: "Kimi Arite Kōfuku" (Japanese: 君ありて幸福)	January 6, 2018
Karin, Itsuki, and Sonoko decide to hold off the enemy, who has the power to nullify their barriers, while Fu helps Mimori head towards the Shinju in order to save Yuna. Finding Yuna entangled by snakes as glowing arms gnaw away at her spirit, Mimori encourages Yuna to speak her true feelings that she doesn't want to die and call out for help. However, the fairies put a barrier up between them, preventing Mimori from reaching Yuna. Just then, the spirit of Gin and all the other fallen heroes lend Mimori their strength, allowing her to break through the barrier and save Yuna. Deciding to put his trust in humans, the Shinju and fallen heroes grant Yuna all their power, allowing her to destroy the flames and save the world. The Shinju dies, but with the flames gone, humanity will survive and live on their own. Yuna, now fully restored from her condition, finally returns to a normal life.

=== Season 3 (The Great Mankai Chapter) ===
No.	Title (Note: English episode titles taken from Hidive.)	Directed by	Written by	Storyboarded by	Original release date
1	"Joyous Youth"; Transliteration: "Seishun no Yorokobi" (Japanese: 青春の喜び)	Tōru Hamasaki	Makoto Uezu	Seiji Kishi; Tōru Hamasaki	October 2, 2021
The Hero Club enjoy their youth by taking part in various activities such as playing in a band, singing karaoke, playing airsoft, and going camping. Speaking with Sonoko, Mimori laments how she had forgotten about Gin when she lost her memories. Just as it seems everyone is getting used to normal life again, Mimori is approached by the Taisha.
2	"I Offer You My Everything"; Transliteration: "Anata ni Watashi no Subete o Sasagemasu" (Japanese: あなたに私のすべてを捧げます)	Tatsuya Sasaki	Makoto Uezu	Naotaka Hayashi; Seiji Kishi	October 9, 2021
Two years prior to the Hero Club's battle against the Vertex, Mebuki Kusunoki and Yumiko Miroku are among several girls who, along with Karin, are recruited by the Taisha to be trained as potential heroes. Despite her efforts to surpass Karin in every way, Mebuki becomes frustrated when Karin is chosen as the next hero instead of her. Following the Hero Club's victory over the Vertex, Mebuki and the other failed candidates are recruited as Sentinels for the Exo-barrier Special Investigations Fleet, tasked with exploring beyond the barrier and restoring the world that once was. On their first voyage to plant a sapling somewhere beyond the barrier, the fleet is attacked by a swarm of Stardusts, narrowly managing to get through without casualties thanks to Mebuki's leadership.
3	"Smallest Joys"; Transliteration: "Chīsana Shiawase" (Japanese: 小さな幸せ)	Hodaka Kuramoto	Makoto Uezu	Daiki Fukuoka	October 16, 2021
As the ESIF continue their mission to plant the sapling from the Shinjuu beyond the barrier, each battle leads to many girls quitting due to being unable to handle the pressure. One of the remaining Sentinels, Suzune Kagajou, tells Mebuki and the others about the time she met the Hero Club. As Mebuki grows more frustrated by how dispensible Sentinels seem to be treated, she and teammate Aya Kokudo spend their day off together, where they both enjoy getting to know each other. The next day, however, Mebuki's group learn that not only is Aya set to be sacrificed by Taisha, but they must also retrieve the sapling they planted in order to save the dying Shinjuu. Realizing that all of their work has been meaningless, Mebuki becomes desperate to both prove her worth and save Aya.
4	"Oracle"; Transliteration: "Shintaku" (Japanese: 神託)	Yasuhiro Geshi	Makoto Uezu	Daiki Fukuoka	October 23, 2021
As Mebuki's squad retrieves the sapling, destroying all the progress that was previously made, they come under attack from what appears to be a Vertex, which critically injures Yumiko. Mebuki attempts to fight the growing number of enemies on herself, the rest of the fleet comes to her aid, allowing everyone to retreat to safety. After Mimori is informed about everything that has happened with the Sentinels, she agrees to be the Taisha's sacrifice in exchange for memory of her existence being removed from the world, resulting in Aya and the other planned sacrifices being spared. As Mimori prepares to sacrifice herself, she sees a vision of Gin, who assures her that it isn't her time yet, after which she awakens to find she has been saved by Yuna and the others.
5	"Brightness Unleashed"; Transliteration: "Kōki o Hanatsu" (Japanese: 光輝を放つ)	Tatsuya Sasaki	Makoto Uezu	Satoshi Shimizu	October 30, 2021
While holding a Christmas party at her place, Sonoko unveils an ancient book titled "The Hero Annals", detailing the records of the first heroes. In the year 2018, three years after the first appearance of the Vertex, five girls; Wakaba Nogi, Yuna Takashima, Tamako Doi, Anzu Iyojima, and Chikage Kori, are all chosen as the heroes who would protect everyone, alongside shrine maiden Hinata Uesato. After one of their missions leads to the death of Tamako and Anzu, Takashima receives serious injuries as a result of backlash from using her trump card to try and enact revenge, while the aftermath puts a lot of stress on Chikage.
6	"Ease My Fears"; Transliteration: "Watashi no Fuan o Yawaragete" (Japanese: 私の不安をやわらげて)	Tōru Hamasaki	Makoto Uezu	Takahiro Tanaka	November 6, 2021
Pushed over the edge by public backlash mocking her dead friends, Chikage retaliates by attacking her old schoolmates until Wakaba steps in to stop her. Chikage only becomes further unstable after she sees Wakaba and Takashima getting seemingly closer with each other. Pretending to be mentally sound in order to participate in a Vertex battle alongside Wakaba, Chikage attempts to kill her so that she can have Takashima to herself.
7	"You Will Never Be Forgotten"; Transliteration: "Kimi o Wasurenai" (Japanese: 君を忘れない)	Akira Katō	Makoto Uezu	Toshiyuki Katō	November 13, 2021
Chikage's attempt to kill Wakaba is thwarted when the Shinjuu forcefully strips her of her powers. As Wakaba strives to protect Chikage from the Vertex in spite of her actions, Chikage dives in to protect her from an incoming Stardust, dying as a result. As the Taisha refuses to acknowledge Chikage as a hero following her death, Wakaba, Takashima and Hinata go to Chikage's house, finding the one thing she didn't destroy in her depression; a diploma that everyone made for her. During a public conference, Wakaba deviates from the provided script and instead states her belief that Chikage was a true hero, prompting Taisha to postpone their decision to strike her from the records.
8	"Eternal Vow"; Transliteration: "Fuhen no Chikai" (Japanese: 不変の誓い)	Yasuhiro Geshi	Makoto Uezu	Daiki Fukuoka	November 20, 2021
Being the only two heroes remaining, Wakaba and Takashima fight against the remaining Vertex, putting their bodies at risk by using their trump cards. When Takashima's trump card runs out, leaving her critically injured, her determination to stop a Vertex from getting through awakens the power of Mankai inside of her and destroys it before succumbing to her injuries. Back in the present, as Yuna and the others reach the end of Wakaba's Hero Annals, Sonoko also finds a gardening hoe among her belongings. That night, Yuna is visited in her dreams by Takashima, whose soul had become a part of the Shinjuu following her death. Takashima offers to take the curse in Yuna's place, but Yuna declines as she doesn't want to put anyone else through her suffering. As Taisha makes arrangements for Yuna's Shinkon ceremony, Mebuki and the other Sentinels are summoned to prepare for a final mission.
9	"True Friendship"; Transliteration: "Shin no Yūjō" (Japanese: 真の友情)	Tatsuya Sasaki	Takahiro	Seiji Kishi; Kōdai Kakimoto	November 27, 2021
As the Sentinels are informed of their mission of protecting the heroes, Mebuki tries to question Taisha about why her memories of the fire offering were altered, but gets few answers. Following a survey mission, Mebuki encounters Karin, who had become distraught after just learning about Yuna's curse. As Karin's worries clash with Mebuki's own views, the two spend the entire night fighting each other, ultimately encouraging each other to make things work. On the day of the Shinkon ceremony, the Sentinels are tasked with making use of a powerful cannon to help the heroes hold off the enemy until the ceremony is complete.
10	"Power Born of Adversity"; Transliteration: "Gyakkyō de Umareru Chikara" (Japanese: 逆境で生まれる力)	Tōru Hamasaki	Makoto Uezu	Daiki Fukuoka	December 4, 2021
As the heroes split into groups to save Yuna while also holding back the heavenly gods, the Sentinels are tasked with protecting Aya and other Taisha followers as they charge the cannon with their prayers. However, the charging fails as followers one by one turn into sand to become one with the Shinjuu. It is then that Mebuki learns from Aya that the purpose of the Shinkon ceremony is to make all of humanity one with the Shinjuu. Encouraged by Mebuki not to give up on life, Aya manages to successfully fire off the cannon just as Karin and Sonoko strike the heavenly god, causing a huge shockwave to spread everywhere. Meanwhile, Fu cuts a way through for Mimori to get to Yuna.
11	"My Heart Burns"; Transliteration: "Watashi no Kokoro wa Moeteiru" (Japanese: 私の心は燃えている)	Marin Kitagawa	Makoto Uezu	Seiji Kishi; Daiki Fukuoka	December 11, 2021
As Itsuki attempts to help Karin and Sonoko escape the blast, Mimori finds Yuna and hears her true wish to be saved. When the fairies put up a barrier between them, the spirits of Gin, Wakaba and all the other past heroes come to her aid, allowing Mimori to save Yuna. Wishing to retain their humanity, Yuna combines her strength with Takashima to defeat the heavenly gods, after which the Shinjuu sacrifices itself to return the world to normal.
12	"Everlasting Joy"; Transliteration: "Itsu Made mo Tsuzuku Yorokobi" (Japanese: いつまでも続く喜び)	Tōru Hamasaki	Makoto Uezu	Satoshi Shimizu	December 18, 2021
With the Shinjuu and its wall no longer around, everyone begins to adjust to a normal life that's different from before. Mebuki and Aya contemplate life going forward while Mimori and Sonoko encounter Aki while visiting Gin's grave. As the Hero Club ponders what to do going forward, Sonoko reveals the hoe she inherited from Wakaba was left behind by the first hero Utano Shiratori as a symbol of the heroes' other duty to help restore the world to the way it was before. After Itsuki convinces her not to go through with a rebellion against Taisha, Sonoko, choosing to decide things for herself, decides to become a new omikoshi to help lead Taisha to the right path. Four years later, as each member of the Hero Club is helping society in their own way, Yuna and Mimori venture into mainland Japan in search of survivors.

=== Yuki Yuna Is a Hero: Churutto! ===
No.	Title	Directed by	Written by	Original release date
1	"A Story That Starts With a Slurp"; Transliteration: "Churutto Hajimaru Monogatari" (Japanese: ちゅるっと始まる物語)	Yuichi Hinata	Haruka	April 10, 2021
A group of pure young girls gathers from various eras at the club room of the Hero Club in Sanshu Middle School in Kagawa with a duty to protect the peace. One day, the club president, Fu, told them that they will come together to make a special udon. Utano suggested Shinshu soba to be best suited as the Hero Club Udon and riled up Fu.
2	"Training With a Slurp"; Transliteration: "Churutto Rensei" (Japanese: ちゅるっと錬成)	Yuichi Hinata	Haruka	April 17, 2021
In order to set an example for everyone, the original Hero Club started making a trial udon. Since there are two members who are good at cooking, they were laughing at the easy idea that they would be able to complete the "Hero Club Udon" today, but then the.... incident happened.
3	"That Hand Is the God Hand"; Transliteration: "Sono Te wa Kami no Te" (Japanese: その手は神の手)	Yuichi Hinata	Haruka	April 24, 2021
The three Yunas worked hard to make udon noodles. However, perhaps they put too much effort into it, and the dough turned out to be harder than expected. With their motto of "act quickly, don't think", the three Yunas get out of the jam by using the only means available to them.
4	"As White As Udon"; Transliteration: "Shiroki Koto Udon no Gotoshi" (Japanese: 白き事うどんの如し)	Yuichi Hinata	Haruka	May 1, 2021
Wakaba and Tamako were feeling like udon after entering the hot springs. What is Udon? While Wakaba is searching for the direction of Hero Club Udon, Tamako is doing the opposite. That is because there are tall mountains in front of her eyes!
5	"Do Heroes Dream of Udon?"; Transliteration: "Yūsha wa Udon no Yume o Miru ka" (Japanese: 勇者はうどんの夢を見るか)	Yuichi Hinata	Haruka	May 8, 2021
A sleepover party for the younger group, consisting of elementary school students and junior high school students. The topic of discussion was how to make the best udon. They discuss various opinions such as what should be tasty, what should look good, etc., and finally complete the best udon ......?
6	"Declaration of Udon Overthrowal"; Transliteration: "Datō Udon Sengen" (Japanese: 打倒うどん宣言)	Yuichi Hinata	Haruka	May 15, 2021
In the Divine Era, when Shikoku became the world, udon is the staple food and the national dish. However, among the Heroes summoned from all over Japan in the past, there were definitely those who favored soba and ramen. There is no way that this will not cause conflict. ......
7	"Vessel of a Hero"; Transliteration: "Yūsha no Utsuwa" (Japanese: 勇者の器)	Yuichi Hinata	Haruka	May 22, 2021
Mebuki Kusunoki, the commander of the Sentinels, does not have great cooking skills. However, with the help of her friends, she realises that there is something that only she can do. She must be a great member of the Hero Club!
8	"Udon Dwells In Faithful Hearts"; Transliteration: "Shinjiru Kokoro ni Udon wa Yadoru" (Japanese: 信じる心にうどんは宿る)	Yuichi Hinata	Haruka	May 29, 2021
There are Mikos who belong to the Hero Club. They, too, have been struggling with the development of udon for the Hero Club. Using their ability to obtain oracles from Shinju-sama, the god of this world, they try to come up with a supreme udon, but then a helper intervenes!
9	"The World Seen Beyond the Warmth"; Transliteration: "Yuge no Mukō ni Miru Sekai" (Japanese: 湯気の向こうに見る世界)	Yuichi Hinata	Haruka	June 5, 2021
In the Hero Club where all the innocent girls are gathered, there is a Hero, Chikage Koori who is aware of her own distortion. The only thing that saved her from being distorted by her harsh upbringing was a simple call and a pair of straight eyes. That's all it took.
10	"What is the Lost Item?"; Transliteration: "Otoshimono wa Nan Desu ka?" (Japanese: 落し物はなんですか？)	Yuichi Hinata	Haruka	June 12, 2021
A member of the Hero Club accidentally drops "something" into the spring. What they have in common leads to a fantastic chaos. It is a fairy tale, a violence, and a mysterious event full of mysteries.
11	"The Justice of Udon Lies Within Me"; Transliteration: "Udon no Seigi wa Ware ni Ari" (Japanese: 饂飩ノ正義ハ我二有リ)	Yuichi Hinata	Haruka	June 19, 2021
12	"Slurp Till You Drop!"; Transliteration: "Susure, Chikara no Kagiri ni!" (Japanese: すすれ、力の限りに！)	Yuichi Hinata	Haruka	June 26, 2021
