= List of Show by Rock!! episodes =

Show by Rock!! is an anime television series produced by Bones based on the video game franchise created by Sanrio. It follows a girl named Cyan who warps into a world filled with music, and joins the rock group Plasmagica to battle against evil. The series is directed by Takahiro Ikezoe and written by Touko Machida, with music composed by Yasuharu Takanashi, Funta7 and Rega Sound. It aired in Japan between April 5 and June 21, 2015, and is licensed in North America by Funimation, who simulcast the series is aired and streamed a broadcast dub version from June 7, 2015.

The opening theme is "Seishun wa Non-Stop!" (青春はNon-Stop!; lit. 'Youth is Non-Stop!') and the ending theme is "Have a Nice Music!!", both performed by Plasmagica (Cyan (Gt. & Vo.) (Eri Inagawa/Bryn Apprill), Chuchu (Gt. & Vo.) (Sumire Uesaka/Alexis Tipton), Retoree (Ba. & Vo.) (Manami Numakura/Caitlin Glass) and Moa (Dr. & Vo.) (Ayane Sakura/Monica Rial)). A short series, Show By Rock!! Short!!, aired between July 4 and September 19, 2016, and was also simulcast and dubbed by Funimation. The main theme is "Do-Re-Mi-Fa Party" (ドレミファParty) by Plasmagica. A second season, Show By Rock!!#, began airing on October 2, 2016. The opening theme is "Heart o Rock!!" (ハートをRock!!; lit. 'We'll Rock Your Heart!!') while the ending theme is "My Song is YOU!!", both performed by Plasmagica.

== Episode list ==
=== Show by Rock!! (2015) ===
| No. | Title | Original release date |
|---|---|---|
| 1 | "Have a nice Music!!" | April 5, 2015 |
Cyan Hijirikawa is a shy high school girl who loves music and wants to become part of band but is too shy to ask to join one. One night, she is suddenly sucked inside a rhythm game on her phone into a musical world known as Tokyo Midi City, being intercepted a talking pink guitar midflight. When she regains her senses, Cyan finds herself in a cat-like form, witnessing a performance by the band Trichronika. Just then, a mysterious monster appears, attempting to drain the power from the Melodisian Stones in Trichronika's hearts in order to turn them dark. Spurred on by her guitar, named Strawberry Heart, Cyan manages to defeat the monster with a guitar jam. Shortly afterwards, as Cyan now finds herself in a catgirl form, she is scouted by Maple Arisugawa, the CEO of the Branded Rocking Records record label, to become a member of his band Plasmagica, and is introduced to fellow members Chuchu, Retoree, and Moa.
| 2 | "With our Crimson Gaze... (etc)" Transliteration: "Ore-tachi wa Shinkōshoku no Shingan de (Ikaryaku)" (Japanese: 俺たちは深紅色の心眼で（以下略）) | April 12, 2015 |
Cyan, after accepting the contract with BRR, she meets the other band, Shingan Crimsonz. Maple is contacted by a representative of Trichronika and is asked to have Shingan Crimonz doing the opening act because the band that they originally had come down with food poisoning. The band was initially against the idea but were quickly convinced by Angelica's scary face. The concert went without a hitch. Cyan is invited to stay at the BRR dormitories when they found out that Cyan had nowhere to stay at. Cyan takes a bath and sings which made her guitar blush. Her other band mates heard her singing and love it. When Cyan is alone again, she learns from Strawberry Heart that she cannot return home until she saves the world that she is in. Cyan agrees on the condition that she will be able to return before Golden Week starts.
| 3 | "Yes! Idol Declaration"; Transliteration: "Yes! Aidoru ♡ Sengen" (Japanese: Yes!アイドル♡宣言) | April 19, 2015 |
Plasmagica is offered a chance to participate in a Battle of the Bands against Unicorn Virtual Music Inc.'s Cristicrista, with Chuchu becoming curious as to why Cyan isn't familiar with them. As everyone focuses on how best to win the battle, Retoree recalls how she joined the band in the hopes of making some friends. Plasmagica become nervous after hearing Criticrista's rehearsal, convinced they can't win. However, Cyan uses her music to ease everyone's nerves, proposing a new arrangement for their song. Despite still losing to Criticrista, the girls are satisfied with their first concert and end up feeling closer than before.
| 4 | "Enchanting Dream Fireworks of a Night Journey"; Transliteration: "Tabiji Yoiyoi Yume Hanabi" (Japanese: 旅路宵酔ゐ夢花火) | April 26, 2015 |
Retoree invites the girls to a performance by the popular enka band Tsurezurenaru Ayatsuri Mugenan, with the crowd becoming impressed by their unique culture and originality. Following the performance, after meeting the band members themselves, the girls feel they need to change their style in order to become more popular. However, Shingan Crimsonz's Rom reminds Plasmagica that the music is what's most important, so they instead decide to write a new song, which is their first song since Cyan joined. Meanwhile, Moa, who is secretly an alien sent to investigate other worlds, grows concerned about her secret.
| 5 | "Maze of Destiny"; Transliteration: "Meikyū Destiny" (Japanese: 迷宮DESTINY) | May 3, 2015 |
After Tsurezurenaru Ayatsuri Mugenan come into contact with another Dark Monster, barely making it out unscathed, Plasmagica get a gig at an upcoming Indies Band concert. Later that night, Chuchu eavesdrop on Cyan as Strawberry Heart reminds her of her mission to fight against the Dark Monsters. On the day of the concert, as another Dark Monster appears elsewhere, Strawberry Heart forces Cyan to leave her concert in order to search for it, despite Chuchu's attempt to stop her. Upon returning after missing the monster, Cyan reveals to the other members that she came from another world, leading Retoree to become upset by the thought that she'll have to go home someday.
| 6 | "Ba-dump!? It's a Beach Training Camp Full of Swimsuits"; Transliteration: "Doki!? Mizugi Darake no Umi Gasshuku Desuzo" (Japanese: DOKIィッ!?水着だらけの海合宿♡ですぞ♪) | May 10, 2015 |
Strawberry Heart and Maple fill in the other members about how the creator of the dark monsters, Unicorn CEO of Virtual Music Inc. Dagger Morse, had originally pulled Cyan into the Sound World for his own plans, but she was intercepted by Strawberry Heart. Wanting his bands to grow stronger for the upcoming Grateful Rock Festival, Maple arranges a training camp, sending Plasmagica to the beach and Shingan Crimsonz to the mountains. During the trip, Cyan tries to convey her feelings to Retoree, but she still can't bring herself to forgive her. Later however, Cyan manages to sing a song that properly gets her feelings across to both Chuchu and Retoree. Afterwards, Moa reveals her identity as an alien, with her bandmates no longer caring about such trivial matters and instead focusing on treasuring their time together, deciding to use Cyan's song for their next performance.
| 7 | "Yokai Street"; Transliteration: "Yōkai Sutorīto" (Japanese: 妖怪ストリート) | May 17, 2015 |
While Dagger's henchman spreads rumors about amazing performances being held in Yokai Street, with the intention of luring out bands, Marimari, a youkai from the band Shinimonogurui, asks Plasmagica for their help in finding her bandmate, Tsugihagi, who went missing amidst monster attacks there. As Shingan Crimsonz go to Yokai Street to perform themselves, they are attacked by a Dark Monster, who drags them into another world and prevents Cyan from following in after them. Despite the odds being against them, Shingan Crimsonz manage to hold their own and defeat the monster, who turns back into Tsugihagi and is reunited with Marimari. Everyone soon makes their way home, unaware that a mysterious dark blob has attached itself to Shingan Crimsonz' Aion.
| 8 | "Crimson Quartet"; Transliteration: "Crimson Quartet: Shinkuki Shijūsō" (Japanese: Crimson Quartet -深紅き四重奏-) | May 24, 2015 |
Plasmagica learn that they can't enter the Grateful Rock Festival as they haven't had a proper live concert yet, so Maple suggests they participate in another battle of the bands against Criticrista. Meanwhile, Aion suddenly decides to quit Shingan Crimsonz to the shock of the other bandmates, leading Cyan to suspect he may be under the influence of a Dark Monster. As Plasmagica and the other Shingan Crimsonz members search for Aion, Trichronika's Shu-Zo informs Rom and Yaiba about Aion's whereabouts, hinting towards some history between him and Rom. Finding Aion at the top of a skyscraper, Crow joins the others in order to apologise to him, restoring the order in his Melodisian Stone. With the crisis averted, Plasmagica turn their attention towards their battle against Criticrista.
| 9 | "Falling Star Dreamline"; Transliteration: "Ryūsei Dorīmurain" (Japanese: 流星ドリームライン) | May 31, 2015 |
As Criticrista prepare for the battle of the bands, Dagger converses with his songwriter. Meanwhile, Chuchu suggests that the girls learn how to improve their performance to enhance their appeal to the fans. When Rom passes this off as superficial, Retoree shows Chuchu a photo of their training camp, showing her the most important thing is to have fun. On the day of the battle, Cyan grows concerned by the attention she gets from Criticrista's lead, Rosia, which also stirs up some dark feelings in Chuchu, but Plasmagica manage to bring out their smiles in their performance and win the battle. However, Dagger punishes Criticrista for their loss by darkening their Melodisian Stones.
| 10 | "Reverse Rhapsody"; Transliteration: "Urahara na Rhapsody" (Japanese: ウラハラなRhapsody) | June 7, 2015 |
Chuchu starts to become overcome with feelings of jealousy towards Cyan's growing popularity, which catches the attention of Dagger. Meanwhile, Berry warns the girls about Dagger's intentions for the Grateful Rock Festival, in which he hopes to obtain Cyan, Shu-zo, and Tsurezurenaru's Darudayu for his own band, suggesting that Plasmagica can defeat Dagger with their music. Later, Chuchu is called out by Dagger, who preys on her selfish desires and sways her over to his side in the hopes of making Cyan despair. Just as Chuchu announces her plans to quit Plasmagica, Strawberry Heart, who is revealed to be possessed by songwriter Grateful King, urges the bandmates to stop her, prompting Cyan and the others to use the song she wrote to help her regain her senses. Chuchu then apologizes for her selfish motives, deciding she has no intention of quitting Plasmagica.
| 11 | "Grateful Rock Festival"; Transliteration: "Gureitofuru Rokku Fesu" (Japanese: グレイトフル・ロック・フェス) | June 14, 2015 |
As everyone assembles at Boodookan for the Grateful Rock Festival, Cyan grows concerned that she hasn't heard from Strawberry Heart since rescuing Chuchu, while Dagger prepares to use a song written by Grateful King to take over Midi City. Midway through the festival, Plasmagica, Shingancrimsonz, Tsurezurenaru, and Trichronika are attacked by a Dark Monster, capturing everyone except for Cyan, Shu-zo, and Darudayu. As Darudayu fights against the monster, Cyan discovers that the Dark Monster is actually Criticrista's Rosia.
| 12 | "Youth is Non-Stop!"; Transliteration: "Seishun wa Non-Stop!" (Japanese: 青春はNon-Stop!) | June 21, 2015 |
Thanks to the efforts of Darudayu and Shu-zo, Cyan manages to use her music to purify the Dark Monster, freeing Rosia and the other Criticrista members. Just then, Dagger makes his appearance, using his power to take everyone captive in order to sway Cyan into joining him. Before Dagger can contaminate Cyan's Melodisian Stone, he is stopped by Grateful King, who managed to escape thanks to the efforts of Maple and his assistant Angelica. As Dagger prepares to use his full power against Cyan, Grateful King blocks Dagger's attack and sends Cyan back towards her own world. Not wanting her friends to fight Dagger alone, Cyan unleashes her own potential and uses her power to defeat Dagger, returning him to his original form. With the battle over, Plasmagica gives one final performance before Cyan returns to her own world, where she works up the courage to join her school's music club.

=== Show by Rock!! Short!! (2016) ===
| No. | Title | Original release date |
|---|---|---|
| 1 | "Tokiko's R-R-R-Room (Plasmagica)"; Transliteration: "Tokiko no Ru-Ru-Ru-Rūmu (Purazumagika)" (Japanese: 時子のルルルルーム(プラズマジカ)) | July 4, 2016 |
Plasmagica appear on a talk show, where the host seems interested in something besides their music.
| 2 | "Fire Away! Putting Our Crimson Flame Into a White Ball... (etc.)" Transliteration: "Uchikome! Ore-tachi no Guren no Honō o Hakkyū ni Lome (ikaryaku)" (Japanese: 打ち込め!俺達の紅蓮の炎を白球に込め(以下略)) | July 11, 2016 |
The Shingan Crimsonz participate in an intense table tennis match while staying at a hot spring inn.
| 3 | "Tokiko's R-R-R-Room (Criticrista)"; Transliteration: "Tokiko no Ru-Ru-Ru-Rūmu (Kuritikurisuta)" (Japanese: 時子のルルルルーム (クリティクリスタ)) | July 18, 2016 |
Tokiko interviews Criticrista, becoming increasingly annoyed by Rosia's attention seeking cuteness.
| 4 | "The Friends of Bamboo Island"; Transliteration: "Takeshima no Tomo" (Japanese: 竹島の友) | July 25, 2016 |
A kendo practitioner named A seeking to become stronger meets a girl from an instrument shop named Un.
| 5 | "Tokiko's R-R-R-Room (Trichronika)"; Transliteration: "Tokiko no Ru-Ru-Ru-Rūmu (Toraikuronika)" (Japanese: 時子のルルルルーム (トライクロニカ)) | August 1, 2016 |
Trichronika appear on Tokiko's show, promoting their upcoming tour.
| 6 | "A Fateful Encounter"; Transliteration: "Unmei no Deai" (Japanese: 運命の出会い) | August 8, 2016 |
As A and Un strike up a friendship, they encounter Darudayu and form Tsurezurenaru Ayatsuri Mugenan.
| 7 | "Tokiko's R-R-R-Room (Shingan Crimsonz)"; Transliteration: "Tokiko no Ru-Ru-Ru-Rūmu (Shingan Kurimuzonzu)" (Japanese: 時子のルルルルーム (シンガンクリムゾンズ)) | August 15, 2016 |
The Shingan Crimsonz appear on Tokiko's show, only to get upstaged by Trichronika's commercial.
| 8 | "Spa Resort Midicians CM Making-Of"; Transliteration: "Supa Rizōto Midishianzu CM Meikingu Obu" (Japanese: スパリゾートMIDIシアンズ・CMメイキングオブ) | August 22, 2016 |
A behind-the-scenes look at Criticrista shooting a commercial for a spa resort.
| 9 | "Shūzo's Dream Galaxy Absolutely Dance Studio"; Transliteration: "Shūzo no Yume Ginga Tottemo Dansu Sutajio" (Japanese: シュー☆ゾの夢銀河☆とっても☆ダンススタジオ) | August 29, 2016 |
Trichronika host an instructional dance TV show.
| 10 | "Tokiko's R-R-R-Room (Tsurezurenaru Ayatsuri Mugenan)"; Transliteration: "Tokiko no Ru-Ru-Ru-Rūmu (Tsurezurenaru Ayatsuri Mugenan)" (Japanese: 時子のルルルルーム (徒然なる操り霧幻庵)) | September 5, 2016 |
Tsurezurenaru Ayatsuri Mugenan show up on Tokiko's show, where Tokiko seems amused by Darudayu's daruma form.
| 11 | "St. Midi Girls' Academy Middle School's Special Lecture on Coyness"; Transliteration: "Hijiri Midi Jogakuen Chū-tō-bu Azato-gaku Tokubetsu Kōgi" (Japanese: 聖MIDI女学園中等部 あざと学特別講義) | September 12, 2016 |
Criticrista study up on how to act coy, with Rosia at the top of the class.
| 12 | "Midi-Bop Graffiti High School"; Transliteration: "Midi-Bop Rakugaki Haisukūru" (Japanese: MIDI-BOP 落書きハイスクール) | September 19, 2016 |
In a high school setting, new transfer student Rom fights against Shuzo to determine who will be top of the school.

=== Show by Rock!!# (2016) ===
| No. | Title | Original release date |
|---|---|---|
| 1 | "Melody: Schlehit Melodie"; Transliteration: "Senritsu: Schlehit Melodie" (Japanese: 旋律-Schlehit Melodie-) | October 2, 2016 |
When Banded Record Records – which now has Criticrista under its label – hosts a concert for its bands, Plasmagica are suddenly attacked by Dagger, who has been resurrected by a group of girls known as Bud Virgin Logic. The girls are rescued by a group known as Ninjinriot, who state they have come from the future to prevent the destruction of Midi City by someone known as the Queen of Darkness. As this new threat weighing on everyone's minds, Cyan – who is back on Earth – is suddenly approached by a large robot who decides to bring her to Midi City once more.
| 2 | "Plasmaism"; Transliteration: "Purazuma-ism" (Japanese: プラズマism) | October 9, 2016 |
After reuniting Cyan with the rest of Plasmagica, the robot, who introduces himself as Ninjinriot's Kamui, reveals that he had brought Cyan with him to help stop the Queen of Darkness. Just as the girls are about to celebrate their reunion, Moa is suddenly ordered to return home after failing to submit her reports, so the girls decide to accompany her to Planet Pyuru to try and convince her superiors to let her stay in Midi City. Upon arriving on Planet Pyuru, they discover that Moa is actually the crown princess of the royal family who became an investigator in order to see the outside world. As Moa pleads her case to the Royal Investigation Committee, she requests that Plasmagica performs for everyone, managing to bring out large amounts of energy from everyone's Melodian Stones. Wowed by her performance, Moa's parents allow Moa to continue her investigation on Sound Planet while also establishing negotiations to have their music broadcast to Planet Pyuru.
| 3 | "Shoot! Ba-Ba-Bang!"; Transliteration: "Hanate! DoDoDōn!" (Japanese: 放て!どどどーん!) | October 16, 2016 |
Both Plasmagica and Criticrista are chosen to participate in a Sweet Sweets Girls Fes, in which they must bake their own sweets to put on sale. After Rosia gives Cyan her thanks for saving her from Dagger, the Plasmagica girls decide to make cookies. On the day of the festival, the impressive displays by the other attendees leave Chuchu worried that their cookies won't sell. Just as Chuchu is feeling downhearted, Cyan reminds her how good the cookies everyone baked together taste, and they soon manage to sell out. Meanwhile, as Shingancrimsonz take part in a sentai show, a mysterious group takes an interest in them.
| 4 | "Ba-dump!? It's a Floaty Water Sports Meet Full of Girls! Po-- (etc.)" Transliteration: "Doki!? Gāruzu Darake no Fuwaffuwa Suiei Taikai! Desu zo Po (Ikaryaku)" (Japanese: ドキィッ!?が～るずだらけのふわっふわ水泳大会!ですぞ♡ポ(以下略)) | October 23, 2016 |
A water sports tournament is held in Midi City, with Plasmagica placed on the white team with Criticrista and Shizuku Secret Mind. As Retoree worries about being put on a chicken fight team with Rosia, they both end up trapped in a storage room together after the door gets blocked. While trapped, Rosia explains how her interest in Cyan is simply because she wants to win against her, changing Retoree's opinion of her. They are eventually found by their teammates and go ahead with the chicken fight, managing to work together to win the tournament for the white team.
| 5 | "Just Awake"; Transliteration: "Jasu Aweiku" (Japanese: ジャスタウェイク) | October 30, 2016 |
The members of Shingan Crimsonz are challenged in a battle of bands by Arcareafact, a new band from Judas that just surpassed Trichronika and reached the top spot of the weekly ranking. Meanwhile, the girls of Plasmagica discuss new ways to improve themselves and Cyan decides to write a song with a different style than what they are used to. Thanks to Arcareafact's secretary being possessed by darkness and rigging the vote system, the battle with Shingan Crimsonz ends with Arcareafact winning by a landslide. Some time later, Retoree hacks into the system and discovers the fraud, but when the girls decide to reveal the truth to Shingan Crimsonz, they prefer not to, upon seeing that they already had overcome their defeat and are more determined than ever. Soon after, Dagger appears on a monitor, declaring war against Plasmagica.
| 6 | "Cadenza" | November 6, 2016 |
Dagger challenges Plasmagica to face Bud Virgin Logic in a battle of the bands, worrying Rosia. As the girls prepare for this battle, Cyan struggles with writing her new song, becoming worried about not living up to everyone's expectations. Meanwhile, Yaiba, Crow, and Aion all learn that Rom and Shuzo were once part of a band called Amatelast together. Having still not written anything, Cyan, guilty over holding everyone back, runs away from home and goes to see Grateful King.
| 7 | "Song of the Lanterns on the 16th Night"; Transliteration: "Izayoi wi Bonbori-Uta" (Japanese: 十六夜ゐ雪洞唄) | November 13, 2016 |
While Cyan begins training under Grateful King, Shingan Crimsonz go on their own training camp. After hearing from Rom about how Amatelast came to break up, the band decide to write a new song together. Meanwhile, Tsurezure manage to use their talent to make it past a group of guardians to reach the "hope" on the other side. As Cyan finds most of her "training" to be manual labor that seems impossible for one person, she eventually comes to the realization that she needs her friends by her side. Reuniting with her bandmates and apologising for everything, Cyan and the others decide to write their new song together.
| 8 | "Re: Climb" | November 20, 2016 |
Having returned from their training camp, Shingan Crimsonz challenge Arcareafact for a rematch. Despite unwilling to accept at first, the members of Arcareafact are convinced to by their secretary, who corrupts their Melodisian stones, save for their vocalist Titan, who was taking care of his younger siblings. On the day of the battle between Shingan Crimsonz and Arcareafact, Plasmagica exposes the scheme used to rig the voting system in their last confrontation, and when Rom is about to attack them in anger, Shuzo appears to calm him down. During their performance, the members of Arcareafact realize their errors and their Melodisian stones are purified, but Shingan Crimsonz ends up declared the victors. After the battle, the members of Arcareafact discover that their secretary ran away with all their possession and assets, and Titan reveals to the others that his family went broke long ago and he now lives in poverty with his siblings, a fact that they claim to not care at all, specially now that all members of the band are broke as well.
| 9 | "Dynaimism Eternal"; Transliteration: "Kizuna Eternal" (Japanese: 絆エターナル) | November 27, 2016 |
Plasamagica have already finished the new song that is to be used to challenge Bud Virgin Logic. But it turns out, one of Bud Virgin's band members Hundreko doesn't want Ailane to be evil and darken the bands Melodisian Stones because she wants Ailane to be her inner self and not become selfish for hating music and not to obey Dagger. In the battle of the bands contest, BVL are up first and play themselves as their stones begin turning dark. Second up is Plasmagica and with their performance, whiten the Melodisian stones of the audience and BVL. After the battle, the results are about to be announced but Dagger disrupts the results by punishing Bud Virgin Logic and turning them into a Dragon Lion hybrid Dark Monster to which Dagger teleports Plasmigica into the 3D battle world to face off against them.
| 10 | "Solitude of Judgment"; Transliteration: "Danzai no Sorityūdo" (Japanese: 断罪のソリテュード) | December 4, 2016 |
In the 3D world, Dagger and BVL are ready to attack Plasmagica but Victorious arrives and subdue the two bands resulting in Plasmagica, Dagger and BVL thrown back into their 2D selves while Victorious shows up on top of the stage and reveals her intent to conquer Sound World and retreats. It turns out that Arcarafect's new secretary was Victorious, the Queen of Darkness (the lady with the Starship from the beginning of the season) and was the one responsible for making Arcarafect cheat for money, rigging the voting in the battle of the bands contest, robbed Arcarefect to use the funds to build her starship fleet with her black hole canon to darken other bands' stones in order to conquer the world. Reluctantly, Dagger temporarily allies himself with Maple. Later at BRR, Aion reveals that Ailane was Aion's sister. They both came from a noble family after but they separated when Aion ran away for his love of music while Aileen had to take responsibility for being the next heir. After searching for Aileen, Aion talks to his sister apologizing for leaving her. Aileen then regains her love for music then resolves that she will sing for everybody as she is departing to another city and forgives her brother and tells him that she loves him. Back at the BRR, Plasmagica, ShinganCrimsonZ, Criticrista and Trichronika team up to stop Victorious from conquering Sound Planet as well as Grateful King who arrives soon after to help the bands by writing their new song in order to stop the catastrophe. Meanwhile, Tsurezurenaru Ayatsuri Mugenan finds the giant Melodisan Stone to help them in the upcoming battle...
| 11 | "My Resolution" | December 11, 2016 |
At Victorious' base, Victorious has a sad flashback about the time she lost her friend Asteral in Ordinis. Her flashback begins in her younger days with the two singing together and climbing on the mountain to become the new ruler. But Asteral betrays her by leaving her to fall which in turn darkens her Melodisian stone causing her to become cruel. She reclimbs the mountain and screams furiously at Astreal causing Asteral to fall to her doom. With her newfound dark power, Victorious became the new ruler and ruled with an iron fist. Back at BRR, the bands and the Grateful King practice with a plan to perform at the Pyuru Land Amusement Park opening. At the Amusement Park opening night, the bands are about to perform but Victorious arrives and captures them. Victorious is ready to darken their stones but Maple arrives in his mech and prepares to save the other bands for the final battle.
| 12 | "My Song is You!" | December 18, 2016 |
It's Maple and bands vs Victorious for the final showdown! It begins when Maple launches a missile fist but failed causing Victorious to knock Maple unconscious. Victorious is about to finish Maple off when Tsurezurenaru Ayatsuri Mugenan arrives with a giant Melodisian Stone to drop on Victorious while the bands escape and along with Grateful King are going to sing their own song to cure Victorious' stone. The bands are still struggling with Victorious but Maple sacrifices himself to push the stone on Victorious and saves everyone. Victorious then has a flashback of her younger self and has a change of heart, regaining her love of music in the process. While Shinigan CrimsonZ and Plasmagica sung pretty well, they become saddened by Maple's sacrifice only for a burnt Maple to appear revealing he survived. While he tries to get the bands to admit they missed him, Victorious decides to be good and sing for everybody so she won't be evil again. In the final performance, Plasmagica, Criticrista, ShiniganCrimsonZ, Trichronika and Tsurezurenaru Ayatsuri Mugenan sing together until Ninjinriot arrives to pick up Cyan and take her back to her own world. After a tearful goodbye, Cyan successfully finishes the new song for the band and performs for everybody in the credits scene.

=== Show by Rock!! Mashumairesh!! (2020) ===
| No. | Title | Original release date |
|---|---|---|
| 1 | "White Startline"; Transliteration: "Masshiro Sutātorain" (Japanese: まっしろスタートライン) | January 9, 2020 |
Upon coming home from harvesting daikon radishes from the snow ridden fields. Howan receives a letter of notification that she passed the first round of the auditions for the next generation of singers contest. Howan announces the news to her family who are elated by the fact. The following day, Howan takes a train to Midi City. Arriving from the Under North Zawa Station, Howan is bedazzled by the city's iridescent lights and atmosphere. Elsewhere, Himiko, Delmin, and Ruhuyu practice at Himiko's uncle's studio. Once they're done, they leave the studio and Himiko finds a paper about an audition. Ruhuyu decides the group should put on a street performance in order to attract a crowd that will catch the attention of the paper's missing owner. Meanwhile, Howan is distressed about her lost paper until she hears Himeko's band playing a street performance. Captivated by the performance, Howan joins them, while singing and playing her guitar.
| 2 | "Yell and Response"; Transliteration: "Ēru Ando Resuponsu" (Japanese: エールアンドレスポンス) | January 16, 2020 |
After the street performance, Himeko and the band with their new friend Howan eat at a restaurant and return Howan's lost paper. Afterwards, the Ruhuyu and Delmin give Howan a tour of the city. Their stop is at the music studio they practice at where they find Himeko's uncle "corpse". An exuberant Ruhuyu treats the situation like a murder investigation and believes that Himeko is the culprit based on the evidence left behind. Contrary to that, the group set off to prove Himeko's innocence. However, in there search for the truth, the testimony they hear seems to only reinforce that Himeko murdered her uncle. With the evidence and testimony affirming that Himeko was the culprit, they return to the studio to find Himeko's uncle alive and well. Himeko's uncle explains that after trying out some new super spicy sauce, he faints due to its overwhelming spiciness. Afterwards, since Howan has no place to stay at, Himeko allows, Howan to stay at her home. The following day while the group eats the same restaurant the day prior, they get involved in a fight with a couple of boy bands.
| 3 | "On The Bike"; Transliteration: "Idōshudan wa Baiku desu" (Japanese: 移動手段はバイクです) | January 23, 2020 |
Howan, Himeko, Delmin and Ruhuyu went to watch a concert conducted by a bunch of high school delinquents who were forced to form a band called Dokonjofinger to do community service by performing on stage as a band. Since these boys are being forced and have problems with each other from the beginning, they fought each other after the concert. After the concert, Howan looks for a part-time job with Himeko's help while got into a fight with a certain street delinquent and beating them up. The relationship between the band members of Dokonjofinger had a slight improvement after managing to make their live performance a success after winning another fight the same street delinquent.
| 4 | "No Problem!!" | January 30, 2020 |
The girls have a hot pot party in Himeko's house to celebrate Howan's job interview, but something's up with Ruhuyu and Delmin. That something is that Delmin picked up Ruhuyu's chuuni notebook and have read it, which had Ruhuyu went hiding inside Himeko's storeroom. After a few chat with Ruhuyu, Delmin got angry and run out of the house because Ruhuyu wants to be special like her but doesn't understand her enough. The girls went to find Delmin. Ruhuyu found her and chat with her regarding the matter. They agreed to be friends and proceed onto playing a game that requires the girls to tell their secrets to each other. After that, they proceed onto continuing their hotpot party.
| 5 | "Parallelism Crown" | February 6, 2020 |
At the concert of the popular band, Reijing Signal, Howan is chosen from the audience to go to the backstage party. Howan got to have a peek into the lives of Reijing Signal. At the same time, Himeko starts to feel uneasy about Howan as she did not return home until she picked Howan up together with Delmin and Ruhuyu. Rararin expressed her interest in Howan but she allows Howan to leave them until she feels it is appropriate to bring her into Reijing Signal.
| 6 | "Heromeans"; Transliteration: "Heromenesu" (Japanese: ヒロメネス) | February 13, 2020 |
Himeko's been acting strange ever since Howan came back from Reijing Signal's backstage party, so Howan discusses other band members and tries different things to get her to open up and to talk about the formation of a band. She tried to open her up by making her good food and bring Himeko to a karaoke session with Delmin and Ruhuyu, but to no avail. Himeko snapped and left home to go to the studio after Howan tried to get her to go on a vacation to the beach together with her, Delmin and Ruhuyu. With Himeko left her guitar at home, Howan decided to find Himeko together with Delmin and Ruhuyu. When they asked about it, the owner of the studio said that he didn't saw her in the studio. After the girls went elsewhere to search for Himeko and fails, they return to ask the owner of the studio for the possible places that Himeko may go to. He revealed that Himeko goes to the beach whenever she has a hard time writing a new song. Howan then runs out from the studio to the beach and found Himeko. After an emotional conversation with each other, Himeko reveals that she is afraid to lose her when she went to Reijing Signal's backstage party and is not back home for a while. They stay with each other until the morning comes. Himeko, Ruhuyu, Delmin and Howan forms a band called Mashumairesh!!
| 7 | "Endless Waltz of Crimson Flashing Wings with Guts"; Transliteration: "Dokonjō to Shinkōshoku no Tsubasa Hirameku Endless na Waltz" (Japanese: ど根性と深紅色の翼閃くEndlessなWaltz) | February 20, 2020 |
Mashumairesh! and Dokonjofinger has each decided to conduct a training camp to improve themselves and as for Dokonjofinger, making a new song. While Dokonjofinger ends up in a curling competition against Shingan Crimsonz and lost, Mashumairesh went to the water park with some discussions on the direction of the band.
| 8 | "The Sky of Neon Tetras"; Transliteration: "Neon Tetora no Sora" (Japanese: ネオンテトラの空) | February 27, 2020 |
The newly-formed Mashumairesh! gets a challenge to play in a battle of the bands against the popular band, Reijing Signal. Mashumairesh! soon finds that they might lose Howan if they lost to Reijing Signalafter Uiui reveal the contract that Howan had put her fingerprint on. They lost the challenge but Howan stayed in the band because Reijing Signal's leader, Rararin was furious at her response to their defeat. Rararin tears up the contract and left the place with the members of Reijing Signal, giving up her right to take Howan with her.
| 9 | "Iron Plate In The Bag"; Transliteration: "Kaban ni wa Teppan desu" (Japanese: カバンには鉄板です) | March 5, 2020 |
As the principal of their school raises eyebrows about their sincerity in doing their band activities, Dokonjofinger needs to decide what they want out of being in a band together. When the band is lacklustre in their decision to do their band activities seriously, Yasu went on a journey to stardom himself. After his secret activity to stardom has been exposed, he faced them to express his wish to do their band activities seriously. The band decided to do their band activities seriously and join the Midi City music festival. With that resolved, he quit his "secret" stardom activities and focus on Dokonjofinger band activities.
| 10 | "Platform"; Transliteration: "Purattohōmu" (Japanese: プラットホーム) | March 12, 2020 |
Himeko is having trouble coming up with ideas for a new song, so the other three try all sort of different and sometimes, weird things to help. With that, they finally figured to take the whole band to Howan's hometown for a training camp to help Himeko to make a new song. After the training camp in Howan's hometown, Himeko finally made a new song and sleep soundly on the way back to Midi City as she took the whole night make the song.
| 11 | "Your Rhapsody"; Transliteration: "Kimi no Rapusodī" (Japanese: キミのラプソディー) | March 19, 2020 |
Before Mashumairesh!! is scheduled to play at Midi Rock, the girls are excited about their performance. The girls decided to sleep for a moment before their performance time at the festival. As for Dokonjofinger, they are helping Yasu's mother to make bento for the customers at the festival before their performance time at the festival.
| 12 | "Mashumairesh!!" | March 26, 2020 |
The members of Mashumairesh!! overslept and rushes to the concert. They have to rush to the backstage to register before the start of Reijing Signal's performance. Howan realises that she left her guitar in the studio so she went to the studio and tries to get to the backstage before their performance starts. After the festival, the girls decided to conduct a street performance and hang out with each other after the performance.

=== Show by Rock!! Stars!! (2021) ===
| No. | Title | Directed by (Note: Information is taken from the ending credits of each episode.) | Written by | Original release date |
|---|---|---|---|---|
| 1 | "Speed Up"; Transliteration: "Supīdo Appu" (Japanese: スピードアップ) | Daigo Yamagishi | Tōko Machida | January 7, 2021 (Note: Episode 1 and 2 were pre-screened on December 27, 2020 at the Shinjuku Wald 9 theater in Tokyo.) |
| 2 | "Final Opinion" | Kang Won-young, Kim Young-bum | Daisuke Watanabe | January 14, 2021 |
| 3 | "Do! It! Happy Adventure!"; Transliteration: "Do! It! Happī Daibōken!" (Japanese: Do！It！Happy大冒険！) | Tomonori Mine | Daisuke Tazawa | January 21, 2021 |
| 4 | "We're Crimson, I'm Joker (etc.), and Obento Magnum"; Transliteration: "Oretachi wa Shinkōshoku no I'm Joker de (Chūryaku) Obento Magunamu" (Japanese: オレ達は深紅色のI'm JOKERで（中略）OBENTO MAGNUM) | Hitomi Ezoe | Tōko Machida | January 28, 2021 |
| 5 | "Sq-Sq-Squeeze♡Heart Shaker and Ain't Nobody Stop"; Transliteration: "Kyukyukyun♡Hāto Sheikā na Ain't Nobody Stop" (Japanese: きゅきゅきゅん♡ハートシェイカーなain't nobody STOP) | Kang Won-young, Choi Ju-yi, Lee Gab-min | Daisuke Watanabe | February 4, 2021 |
| 6 | "Maiden Mirage"; Transliteration: "Otome Kagerō" (Japanese: 乙女陽炎) | Hitoshi Haga | Daisuke Tazawa | February 11, 2021 |
| 7 | "Pass Stage"; Transliteration: "Pasutēji" (Japanese: パステージ) | Tomonori Mine | Tōko Machida | February 18, 2021 |
| 8 | "Runners High!!"; Transliteration: "Ran'nāzu Hai!!" (Japanese: ランナーズハイ!!) | Motoki Nakanishi | Daisuke Tazawa | February 25, 2021 |
| 9 | "Empire Dominator" | Hitomi Ezoe | Daisuke Watanabe | March 4, 2021 |
| 10 | "You Are My Princess"; Transliteration: "Kimi wa Boku no Purinsesu" (Japanese: キミはボクのプリンセス☆) | Tomonori Mine | Daisuke Watanabe | March 11, 2021 |
| 11 | "Starry Sky Light Story"; Transliteration: "Hoshizora Raito Sutōrī" (Japanese: 星空ライトストーリー) | LEE Gab min | Daisuke Tazawa | March 18, 2021 |
| 12 | "Anokanatarium"; Transliteration: "Anokanatariumu" (Japanese: アノカナタリウム) | Daigo Yamagishi | Tōko Machida | March 25, 2021 |
