= Katsumi Tamegai =

Japanese animator (born 1965)

- 爲我井 克美
- Born: July 12, 1965 (age 61); Kanagawa Prefecture, Japan
- Occupations: Animator, Character Designer, Animation Director
- Years active: 1987–present
- Employer: Toei Animation (1990–present)
- Notable work: Sailor Moon (Sailor Stars); Pretty Cure series

Japanese name
- Kanji: 爲我井 克美
- Hiragana: ためがい かつみ
- Romanization: Tamegai Katsumi

Katsumi Tamegai (Japanese: 爲我井 克美, Hepburn: Tamegai Katsumi; born July 12, 1965) is a Japanese animator, character designer and animation director that works at Toei Animation. He is most notable for his episode animation director work on the 1990s Sailor Moon anime series and character design for its fifth and final season. His other notable works include his episode animation direction work for the Pretty Cure series.

== Career ==
Katsumi Tamegai entered the industry in 1987, and provided few key animations for few OVAs. From 1992 to 1996, at Toei Animation, Tamegai provided many episode animation directions and key animations for Sailor Moon series. After Ikuko Itoh's departure, Tamegai became the next character designer for its fifth and final season, Sailor Moon Sailor Stars in 1996.

In 1997, after Sailor Moon had ended, he continued to work at Toei Animation, and provided few episode animation direction for Cutey Honey Flash and Fushigi Mahou Fan Fan Pharmacy. In 1999, Tamegai was chosen as a chief animation director for Phantom Thief Jeanne, which were character designed by Hisashi Kagawa.

From 2004 and onwards, Tamegai worked as a frequent episode animation director for the Pretty Cure series, and character designed each respective movies.

== Works ==
=== TV Anime ===
Year	Title	Credit	Note
1992-93	Sailor Moon	Animation Director (eps. 43), Key Animation (eps. 18, 24, 43)	
1993-94	Sailor Moon R	Animation Director (eps. 4, 13, 20, 26, 28, 33, 38), Key Animation (eps. 4-5, 20, 26, 28, 33, 38, 40)	
1994-95	Sailor Moon S	Animation Director (eps. 2, 7, 16, 25, 30), Key Animation (eps. 16)	
1995-96	Sailor Moon SuperS	Animation Director (eps. 1, 7, 15, 22, 29)	
1996-97	Sailor Moon Sailor Stars	Character Design, Animation Director (OP; eps. 1, 14, 19, 24, 34), Key Animation (eps. 1, 7, 14, 19, 34)	
1997-98	Cutey Honey Flash	Animation Director (eps. 7, 14, 22, 30, 35), Key Animation (eps. 7)	
1998-99	Fushigi Mahou Fan Fan Pharmacy	Animation Director (eps. 2, 5, 11, 17, 23, 29, 35, 41)	
1999	Magic User's Club	Key Animation (eps. 4, 13)	
1999–2000	Phantom Thief Jeanne	Chief Animation Director, Animation Director (eps. 1, 11, 20, 28, 36, 44), Key Animation (eps. 20, 28, 36)	
2004-05	Futari wa Pretty Cure	Animation Director (eps. 1, 8, 17, 24, 31, 39), Key Animation (eps. 8, 17, 24, 31, 39)	
2005-06	Futari wa Pretty Cure Max Heart	Key Animation (eps. 21)	
2006-07	Futari wa Pretty Cure Splash Star	Animation Director (eps. 5, 14, 23, 31), Key Animation (eps. 5, 14, 23, 49)	
2007-08	Yes! PreCure 5	Animation Director (eps. 7, 15), Key Animation (eps. 7, 15, 23, 46)	
2008-09	Yes! PreCure 5 GoGo!	Animation Director (eps. 8, 16), Key Animation (eps. 8, 16)	
2009-10	Fresh Pretty Cure!	Animation Director (eps. 1, 12), Key Animation (eps. 1, 12, 21, 50)	
2010-11	HeartCatch PreCure!	Animation Director (eps. 7, 15, 24, 33, 43), Key Animation	
2011-14	Toriko	Animation Director (eps. 2, 10, 17, 21, 28, 36, 44, 52, 62, 69, 77), Key Animation (eps. 2, 7, 10, 17, 21, 28, 36, 44, 52, 62, 69, 77)	
2015-16	Go! Princess PreCure	Animation Director (eps. 4, 13, 23, 36, 43), Key Animation (eps. 4, 8-9, 13, 18, 23, 29, 36, 43, 50)	
2016-17	Witchy PreCure!	Chief Animation Director (eps. 1-10, 16), Animation Director (eps. 15, 23, 31, 39, 50), Key Animation (eps. 1, 15, 23, 31, 39, 41-42, 47, 50)	
2017-18	Kirakira Pretty Cure a la Mode	Animation Director (eps. 11), Key Animation (eps. 11)	
2018-19	Hug! Pretty Cure	Animation Director (eps. 22)	
2019-20	Star Twinkle PreCure	Animation Director (eps. 5, 11, 19, 31), Key Animation (eps. 1, 6, 14, 19, 27, 37)	
2020-22	Dragon Quest: The Adventure of Dai	Chief Animation Director (eps. 30, 34, 36, 39, 42, 46, 51, 53, 56, 60, 64, 67, 70, 74, 77, 81, 83, 85, 91, 94, 97), Animation Director (eps. 98-100), Key Animation (OP2; eps. 37-38, 40-41, 88)	
2020-21	Healin' Good Pretty Cure	Animation Director (eps. 1, 8, 44), Key Animation (eps. 1, 3, 4, 10)	
2021-22	Tropical-Rouge! Pretty Cure	Animation Director (eps. 4)	
2022-23	Delicious Party Pretty Cure	Key Animation (eps. 4)	
2023-24	Soaring Sky! Pretty Cure	Animation Director (eps. 2, 12, 22, 32), Assistant Animation Director (eps. 5), Key Animation (eps. 2, 22, 32)	
2024-25	Wonderful Pretty Cure!	Animation Director (eps. 1, 17, 43), Key Animation (eps. 1, 17, 43)	
2025-26	You and Idol Pretty Cure	Animation Director (eps. 4, 30)	
2026–present	Star Detective Precure!	Animation Director (eps. 1)	

=== Anime film ===
Year	Title	Credit	Note
1994	Sailor Moon S: The Movie	Animation Director	
1995	Sailor Moon SuperS: The Movie	Assistant Animation Director	
2003	Interstella 5555: The 5tory of the 5ecret 5tar 5ystem	Chief Animation Director, Animation Director	
2005	Futari wa Pretty Cure the Movie	Character Design, Animation Director	
2005	Futari wa Pretty Cure Max Heart the Movie 2: Friends of the Snow-Laden Sky	Character Design, Animation Director	
2006	Futari wa Pretty Cure Splash Star: Tick-Tock Crisis Hanging by a Thin-Thread!	Character Design, Animation Director	
2007	Yes! PreCure 5 the Movie: Great Miraculous Adventure in the Mirror Kingdom!	Character Design, Animation Director	
2008	Yes! PreCure 5 GoGo! the Movie: Happy Birthday in the Sweets Kingdom	Character Design, Animation Director	
2009	Fresh Pretty Cure! the Movie: The Toy Kingdom has Lots of Secrets?!	Character Design, Animation Director	
2010	HeartCatch PreCure! the Movie: Fashion Show in the Flower Capital…Really?!	Assistant Animation Director	
2015	Go! Princess Pretty Cure the Movie: Go! Go!! Gorgeous Triple Feature!!!	Assistant Animation Director (Pumpkin Kingdom's Treasure)	
2017	Kirakira Pretty Cure a la Mode the Movie: Crisply! The Memory of Mille-feuille!	Character Design, Chief Animation Director	
2018	Pretty Cure Super Stars!	Animation Director	
2018	Hug! Pretty Cure Futari wa Pretty Cure: All Stars Memories	Animation Director	
2021	Healin' Good Pretty Cure the Movie: GoGo! Big Transformation! The Town of Dreams	Character Design, Animation Director	

=== OVA (Original Video Animation) ===
Year	Title	Credit	Note
1987	Shōnen Bakuzoku	Key Animation (eps. 5)	
1988	Xanadu: The Legend of Dragon Slayer	Key Animation	
1988	Tōyama Sakura Uchū Chō - Yatsu no Na wa Gold	Key Animation	
1990	Vampire Wars	Key Animation	
1996-97	Magic User's Club	Key Animation (eps. 5-6)	
