= List of Wonderful Pretty Cure! episodes =

- Season 21
- No. of episodes: 50

Release
- Original network: ANN (ABC TV, TV Asahi)
- Original release: February 4, 2024 – January 26, 2025

Series chronology
- ← Previous; Soaring Sky! Pretty Cure Next → You and Idol Pretty Cure

Wonderful PreCure! is the twenty-first television anime series in Izumi Todo's Pretty Cure franchise, produced by Toei Animation. The series aired in Japan from February 4, 2024, to January 26, 2025, succeeding Soaring Sky! Pretty Cure in its timeslot and succeeded by You and Idol Pretty Cure. Chihaya Yoshitake performs the opening theme, "Wonderful PreCure! Evolution!!" (Japanese: わんだふるぷりきゅあ！evolution!!, Hepburn: Wandafuru Purikyua! Evoryūshon!!) and Moeha Nochimoto and Ami Ishii perform the ending themes "Fun Fun Wonderful Days!" (Japanese: FUN☆FUN☆わんだふるDAYS！) and "Happiness Evolution" (Japanese: しあわせえぼりゅ～しょん♡, Hepburn: Shiawase Eboryu~shon♡). Erika Fukasawa composes the series's music.

== Episodes ==
An original crossover segment between Wonderful PreCure! with TV Asahi and Shin-Ei Animation's Crayon Shin-chan aired on TV Asahi and its affiliates on May 18, 2024, as part of the 1233rd episode of the latter series.

No.	Title	Directed by	Written by	Animation directed by	Art	Original release date
1	"It Starts With "Wonderful!""; Transliteration: "Hajimari wa "Wandafuru!"" (Japanese: はじまりは「わんだふる！」)	Directed by : Yuna Hirosue; Storyboarded by : Masanori Sato	Yoshimi Narita	Katsumi Tamegai and Hanao Iida	Miki Imai	February 4, 2024
In Animal Town, middle school student Iroha Inukai takes her family's pet dog Komugi for a walk at Kaihin Park, along the way stopping by the Mirror Stone, which is said to grant the wishes of those who see their reflection in it, and discussing its possible origins with her classmate Satoru Toyama. Later that day, a ram-like monster called Garugaru attacks the park as Komugi finds a strange stone-like object. When Iroha is cornered while using herself as a distraction to lure the Garugaru away, Komugi's resolve to protect her resonates with the Mirror Stone and causes the stone to turn into a Wonderful Pact, allowing her to become a human and transform into Cure Wonderful. After chasing the Garugaru, she purifies it with a hug, and it returns to its normal form: a sheep-like animal. Though initially in disbelief, Iroha realizes that Komugi is the girl who saved her.
2	"Let's All Be Friends, Cure Friendy!"; Transliteration: "Min'na Tomodachi, Kyua Furendi!" (Japanese: みんな友達、キュアフレンディ！)	Directed by : Tsuyoshi Tobita; Storyboarded by : Noriyo Sasaki	Yoshimi Narita	Ragi Kuon	Miki Azuma	February 11, 2024
The sheep, a Niko Animal named Mey Mey, explains that he is from Niko Garden, a realm that was home to many animals until it was attacked and covered in darkness, corrupting its inhabitants and turning them into Garugaru. He also tells Komugi and Iroha that they must keep the existence of Pretty Cure a secret, despite Iroha wanting others to help them with their mission. Later that day, Iroha realizes that Komugi can now speak as a dog, but tells her to keep this secret as well. When an ostrich Garugaru attacks, Iroha's resolve to help Komugi resonates with the Mirror Stone, granting her a Wonderful Pact and allowing her to transform into Cure Friendy. Together, she and Wonderful purify the Garugaru, after which Mey Mey appears and takes them to Niko Garden so it can recover.
3	"Don't Say It! It's Baaad!"; Transliteration: "Iccha Damē!" (Japanese: 言っちゃダメェ～！)	Directed by : Takao Iwai; Storyboarded by : Shinji Itadaki	Yoshimi Narita	Natsumi Sakai and Yuka Takemori	Yuki Nakabayashi	February 18, 2024
At Niko Garden, Mey Mey explains its history to Komugi and Iroha, revealing that its inhabitants were originally from Earth, but that its creator, Niko, brought them there so that they could live happily. He also reminds them that they must keep their mission secret. Upon returning to Earth, they run into Satoru, who becomes suspicious that they are hiding something from him. While taking Daifuku for a walk in the woods, he finds a Garugaru egg and tries to research it, but cannot find any information about it. Suddenly, the egg hatches into a rabbit Garugaru and begins chasing him. Despite Mey Mey's order, Komugi and Iroha intervene to save him and transform into Pretty Cure in front of him. With his advice, they purify the Garugaru, and it returns to its original form: the Kirarin Rabbit. Komugi, Iroha, and Satoru return to Niko Garden; there, Satoru expresses his desire to help the Cures, which Mey Mey accepts.
4	"The Nekoyashiki's Cat and Mayu"; Transliteration: "Nekoyashiki no Neko to Mayu" (Japanese: 猫屋敷の猫とまゆ)	Directed by : Masaya Nomoto; Storyboarded by : Chiaki Kon	Yoshimi Narita	Hitomi Matsuura	Xu Zhuxing	February 25, 2024
At Mayu's house, her mother Sumire prepares for the opening of her store, Pretty Holic. Meanwhile, Satoru is continuing his research on the Garugaru, believing that gathering more information will help the Cures locate them. Suddenly, Mey Mey calls the trio to Niko Garden, where the Kirarin Rabbit's return has repaired some of the damage done and restored a section of the Niko Diamond. He tells them that if all nine of the Kirarin Animals return, then the Diamond will be fully repaired and Niko may return. Upon returning to Earth, Iroha heads to Pretty Holic to be its first customer, where she and Komugi meet Mayu and Yuki and try on makeup. After Komugi senses a Garugaru nearby, she and Iroha head into the forest and discover a tanuki Garugaru, which they purify and return to Niko Garden. Later, Iroha visits Mayu to give her a gift, and Mayu begins to consider the possibility of them being friends.
5	"Connecting Bonds, Friendly Wand!"; Transliteration: "Tsunagaru Kizuna Furendorī Takuto!" (Japanese: つながるキズナ フレンドリータクト！)	Saiho Noro	Mio Inoue	Mitsuru Aoyama	Natsuko Tosugi	March 3, 2024
While walking Komugi, Iroha meets a girl named Ema, her mother, and their Pomeranian, Pon, and offers to take them to Friendly Animal Hospital & Salon. There, she learns from Ema that they have been trying to get Pon to walk on a leash, reminding her of how she met Komugi and trained her to walk on a leash. When a penguin Garugaru attacks, Wonderful and Friendy struggle to fight it on the ice and Wonderful almost falls into the water. However, their bond causes Komugi's leash to transform into the Friendly Tacts; Friendy can utilize hers with the Kirarin Rabbit's power to track down and purify the Garugaru, returning it to its normal form as the Kirarin Penguin, who returns to Niko Garden. Afterwards, despite Komugi's frustration at being unable to use her Tact's powers, she and Iroha vow to take many more walks together.
6	"Komugi Argues With Iroha"; Transliteration: "Komugi, Iroha to Kenka Suru" (Japanese: こむぎ、いろはとケンカする)	Directed by : Kazuya Onigashira; Storyboarded by : Shinji Itadaki	Yoshimi Narita	Yūki Kitajima	Shota Suzuki	March 10, 2024
Following the Kirarin Penguin's return to Niko Garden, Komugi once more expresses her frustration at being unable to use her Tact's powers, with Mey Mey stating that this may be because she lacks something important as a Pretty Cure. Later that day, as both Pretty Holic and Friendly Animal Hospital & Salon continue business, Komugi expresses her desire to do things together with Iroha and be of use to her. The next day, Komugi finds that her leash is gone, as it turned into the Friendly Tacts. Despite Iroha offering to use another leash, she refuses, as they had picked out the leash together. Later, she confides in Satoru about their argument, with him telling her that Komugi likely feels the same way as her. When a lion Garugaru attacks, Wonderful's Friendly Tact disappears and she and Friendy are unable to purify it, with it fleeing into the mountains. That night, Komugi, distraught over being unable to help Iroha, runs away from home.
7	"Their Friend Liberale!"; Transliteration: "Futari no Furendo Riberāre!" (Japanese: ふたりのフレンドリベラーレ！)	Yoshimi Narita	Yutaka Tsuchida	Hiroshi Numata and Akira Inagami	Yuki Nakabayashi	March 17, 2024
At the dog run, Komugi encounters Satoru, who takes her to his house. While Iroha and her parents are looking for Komugi, he calls them to tell them that she is at his house, but advises them to wait some time, as she is still upset. He tells Komugi to consider Iroha's feelings and to try to talk to her. Later, Mayu visits Iroha to give her a harness for Komugi as thanks for giving her a gift. Meanwhile, in the forest, the lion Garugaru is recovering from the previous fight when a mysterious voice urges it to keep fighting to destroy the world and what humans have made. As Friendy is fighting it, Wonderful realizes that she has become a Cure to protect her. Her resolve causes her Tact to reappear, allowing her to use the Kirarin Penguin's power to chase the Garugaru. Wonderful and Friendy purify the Garugaru with Friend Liberale, returning it to its original form as the Kirarin Lion, who returns to Niko Garden. Afterward, Komugi and Iroha start going on walks together again.
8	"Mayu's Anxious New Semester"; Transliteration: "Mayu no Dokidoki Shingakki" (Japanese: まゆのドキドキ新学期)	Directed by : Misuzu Chiba; Storyboarded by : Hiroya Takahashi	Takao Iwai	Seiji Masuda	Xu Zhuxing	March 24, 2024
As Iroha enrolls at Second Wangan Junior High, Komugi tries to go with her, but is told that she has to stay at home. At school, Mayu transfers to Iroha's class, with Iroha helping with her introduction to the class after she botches it, after which the teacher offers that she give Mayu a tour of the school. Meanwhile, Komugi attempts to head to school to be with Iroha, but gets distracted along the way. After school, Satoru and Iroha are showing Mayu around the animal area when a horse Garugaru attacks. Komugi arrives in time to help Iroha pursue it, using the Kirarin Lion's power to do so, and purifies it with Friend Liberale, after which it returns to Niko Garden. Afterward, Komugi tells Iroha and Satoru that she wishes to go to school with them.
9	"Junior High Student Komugi!"; Transliteration: "Komugi, Chūgakusei da Wan!" (Japanese: こむぎ、中学生だワン！)	Directed by : Yuusuke Kanbayashi; Storyboarded by : Noriyo Sasaki	Hideki Hiroshima	Yukiko Ueda & Nobuhito Akada	Natsuko Tosugi	March 31, 2024
Mey Mey informs Komugi and Iroha that Komugi can now go to school because of the Niko Diamond's miracle. At school, Komugi quickly becomes popular, but another student, Sho Ikari, becomes jealous of her because she is better at soccer than he is and starts to view her as his rival. Later that day, he is training to surpass her with what the Cures identify to be a Garugaru egg, which soon hatches into a duck Garugaru. When the Cures purify it and return it to Niko Garden, Komugi reaffirms her desire to go to school with Iroha after school, while she and Satoru offer to help her study.
10	"Memories in the Snow"; Transliteration: "Yuki no Naka no Omoide" (Japanese: ユキの中の思い出)	Directed by : Junko Komura; Storyboarded by : Chiaki Kon	Takao Iwai	Makoto Ozawa and Keisuke Katayama	Yuko Doi	April 7, 2024
At Pretty Holic, which has received more customers, Sumire tells Mayu that she can design a new product to sell. Throughout the day, Mayu struggles to come up with new ideas for the product, despite her classmates' suggestions. Later that day, she is walking by the river when she encounters Iroha and Komugi, reminding her of when she first met Yuki. When she was younger, she had met Yuki at an abandoned house when her family traveled to a village in the mountains for her father's job. Although the villagers told Mayu that Yuki did not trust humans, she bonded with her throughout their stay and was reluctant to part with her when they had to leave. When a raccoon Garugaru attacks, Wonderful and Friendy purify it and return it to Niko Garden, which Yuki witnesses. Afterward, Mayu decides that her new product will be a charm based on Yuki, which soon becomes popular.
11	"A Giant Creature Hiding In the Mountains?!"; Transliteration: "Yama ni Hisomu, Kyodai Seibutsu" (Japanese: 山に潜む、巨大生物！？)	Misuzu Chiba	Kana Shinohara	Nishiki Itaoka	Yuki Nakabayashi	April 14, 2024
At school, Komugi, Iroha, and Satoru hear rumors of a giant creature which has been sighted at Mount Miharashi. Figuring that it is likely a Garugaru, they decide to hike up the mountain in search of it, but do not find anything; however, they deduce that it is likely at the summit, as there were fewer animals as they went higher up the mountain. Meanwhile, a mysterious girl approaches Mayu, warning her to stay away from the mountain. When a bear Garugaru attacks them, they purify it and return it to its normal form as the Kirarin Bear, who returns to Niko Garden, but notice that the gem on its forehead was damaged. At Niko Garden, the Kirarin Bear reveals that there is another Pretty Cure who was responsible for injuring them. That night, the mysterious Pretty Cure is overlooking the city.
12	"I'm Cure Nyammy"; Transliteration: "Watashi wa Kyua Nyamī" (Japanese: 私はキュアニャミー)	Morio Hatano	Mio Inoue	Mika Hironaka and Kenji Miuma	Xu Zhuxing	April 21, 2024
After Mayu tells Iroha that Yuki sometimes disappears, Iroha decides to help her on her day off from school. At Mayu's house, Komugi and Iroha set up a camera to monitor Yuki and go outside to have Komugi track her scent. When this fails, they head into the woods to search for her, where Komugi senses a Garugaru. An owl Garugaru attacks Mayu as she follows them in search of Yuki, but she is saved by a mysterious Pretty Cure, whom she recognizes as the girl she met because they both warned her to stay away from Mount Miharashi. Wonderful and Friendy arrive to confront the Garugaru and are horrified that the Cure is attacking it, with Friendy trying to stop her. After they purify the Garugaru and return it to Niko Garden, Friendy tries to ask the Cure who she is, but she leaves after stating that she is Cure Nyammy.
13	"Search for Cure Nyammy!"; Transliteration: "Kyua Nyamī o Sagase!" (Japanese: キュアニャミーを探せ！)	Saiho Noro	Yusuke Kanbayashi	Yuka Takemori, Joey Calangian, Reggie Manabat, and Hiroshi Numata	Natsuko Tosugi	April 28, 2024
The Cures inform Mey Mey of Nyammy's existence, and, along with Satoru, set out to search for her and discover her true identity. Their search takes them through Animal Town, examining people, objects, and animals that could be Nyammy because of their white color. However, the search is unsuccessful until they meet the elderly ladies, who suggest that Komugi was looking for Mayu's compact, which has Nyammy's scent; despite visiting Pretty Holic, they still cannot find any clues. When a hedgehog Garugaru attacks, Nyammy saves Mayu from it before leaving, but returns to help Wonderful and Friendy at Mayu's request. After they purify the Garugaru and return it to Niko Garden, Mayu wonders who Nyammy is and if she will see her again.
14	"Mayu's First Sleepover"; Transliteration: "Mayu, Hajimete no Otomari" (Japanese: まゆ、はじめてのお泊り)	Directed by : Yuna Hirosue; Storyboarded by : Ryota Nakamura	Junko Komura	Ragi Kuon	Shota Suzuki	May 5, 2024
After Mayu notices that Yuki has been refusing to eat and is not in her usual spots, she takes her to Friendly Animal Hospital & Salon, where Youko determines that she will be fine with rest. Iroha suggests that Mayu stay overnight at her house so that Youko can check on Yuki if anything happens. Later that night, after dinner, Komugi and Iroha are awoken by the sound of a rooster Garugaru and is determined to purify it before anyone wakes up, but Mayu also awakens and decides to follow them. She witnesses them transforming into Pretty Cures and realizes their true identities and that Komugi can transform into a human. During their fight against the Garugaru, Satoru explains to her what the Niko Garden is and who the Pretty Cure are. After they purify the Garugaru and return it to Niko Garden, Mayu decides to support them, but does not know who Nyammy is.
15	"A Day in the Life of Mey Mey the Butler-sheep"; Transliteration: "Hitsuji no Shitsuji Mēmē no Ichinichi" (Japanese: ヒツジの執事 メエメエ の一日)	Directed by : Kazuya Kito; Storyboarded by : Hiroya Takahashi	Misuzu Chiba	Yuki Kitajima and Natsumi Sakai	Yuki Nakabayashi	May 12, 2024
Komugi, Iroha, and Satoru visit Niko Garden with Mayu to introduce her to Mey Mey. Although Mey Mey was initially hesitant because he did not want the others to know about Niko Garden or the Pretty Cures, he warms up to her after she offers to help him with his work as a butler. While helping him and visiting the houses of the Kirarin Animals along the way, he begins to suspect that they are hiding something from him because of their behavior. When the Kirarin Animals sense that a deer Garugaru has awakened in Animal Town, the Cures return to Earth to purify it, returning it to its original form as the Kirarin Fawn. Afterwards, the Kirarin Animals reveal that they were planning a party to thank the Cures for their efforts, which Mey Mey attends despite being upset that they were not honoring him like he thought, but the Kirarin Animals then also invite him for his hard work, much to his joy.
16	"The Mystery of the Mirror Stone"; Transliteration: "Kagami Ishi no Fushigi" (Japanese: 鏡石のふしぎ)	Directed by : Takao Iwai; Storyboarded by : Shinji Itadaki	Yoshimi Narita	Mitsuru Aoyama	Xu Zhuxing	May 19, 2024
On their way to school, Komugi and Iroha run into Youko, who is on her way to work at the zoo and finds Komugi familiar, even though she has never met her as a human. At school, as Iroha feels guilty about lying to hide secrets from her parents, she overhears her classmates discussing rumors that the Mirror Stone has been glowing. Along with Komugi and Satoru, she realizes that investigating the Mirror Stone could help them discover how Komugi gained the ability to turn into a human and how the Cures gained their powers. As Komugi and Iroha investigate the Mirror Stone, they encounter Shinnosuke and Shiro. Upon returning home, they ask Mey Mey if they can tell Iroha's parents about Niko Garden, but he refuses. While they are talking, Youko and Tsuyoshi return home and witness both Komugi and Mey Mey talking, but are not surprised that they can. They explain the legend of the Mirror Stone: long ago, when animals and humans lived in peace, the animals prayed to a god to be able to talk to humans, which they granted through the Mirror Stone. Soon, animals from other lands gathered at the Mirror Stone, and Animal Town was built. However, after conflict broke out among them, the Mirror Stone lost its power as punishment. After Komugi senses a parakeet Garugaru, she and Iroha confront it while Mey Mey explains the situation to her parents. After they purify it and return it to Niko Garden, they return home and are welcomed back by Youko and Tsuyoshi, who have bonded with Mey Mey. Meanwhile, Mayu expresses her wish to be like Iroha; in response, the Mirror Stone begins to glow. Note: Second part of a crossover with TV Asahi and Shin-Ei Animation's Crayon Shin-chan.
17	"I Will Protect You!"; Transliteration: "Watashi ga, Anata o Mamoru!" (Japanese: 私が、あなたを守る！)	Hanako Ueda	Mio Inoue	Katsumi Tamegai	Natsuko Tosugi	May 26, 2024
Since it is baby animal season in Animal Town, Komugi, Iroha, Mayu, and Satoru go on a baby animal tour and see birds, deer, rabbits, kittens, and ducklings. As they stop for a picnic, a tiger Garugaru attacks and Mayu is put in danger while trying to save a duck and her babies. Yuki arrives to protect her and reveals that she is Cure Nyammy and has gained the ability to turn into a human. When Wonderful and Friendy purify it and return it to Niko Garden, she attacks the Garugaru before leaving. Afterwards, Komugi asks Yuki to fight alongside them as a Pretty Cure, but she refuses and orders her, Iroha, and Satoru to stop being friends with Mayu – because she believes they are putting her in danger.
18	"Mayu's Feelings, Yuki's Feelings"; Transliteration: "Mayu no Kimochi, Yuki no Kimochi" (Japanese: まゆの気持ち、ユキの気持ち)	Directed by : Yoshimi Narita; Storyboarded by : Chiaki Kon	Yoshimi Narita	Hitomi Matsuura	Yuko Doi	June 2, 2024
At Niko Garden, the Cures tell Mey Mey and the Kirarin Animals about Cure Nyammy's true identity as Yuki and her refusal to join them. At home, Yuki explains to Mayu that she first gained the power to transform into a human and into Cure Nyammy when the bear Garugaru attacked her and the charm Mayu made transformed into the Shiny Cats Pact. She also tells her to stop being friends with Komugi and Iroha, but at school, they still want to be friends with her. While heading home from school, Komugi senses a hamster Garugaru, but Wonderful and Friendy are unable to purify it because they cannot fit into its tunnels. When the Garugaru later appears near Pretty Holic, Yuki goes to confront it, but it flees after Wonderful and Friendy attempt to stop her from attacking it. Afterwards, Yuki once more tells Mayu to stop being friends with Komugi and Iroha, but Mayu tells her to stop deciding what she does for her. However, she is upset by her outburst and leaves; as Yuki follows her, Komugi and Iroha worry about their friendship.
19	"The Birth Of Cure Lillian"; Transliteration: "Kyua Ririan, Tanjō!" (Japanese: キュアリリアン、誕生！)	Yutaka Tsuchida	Yoshimi Narita	Akira inagami	Yuki Nakabayashi	June 9, 2024
As Komugi, Iroha, and Satoru search for the hamster Garugaru, which fled following their first battle with it, the mysterious voice powers it up by commanding it to take revenge on Nyammy for harming it, giving it the ability to shrink others in addition to itself. Meanwhile, at Pretty Holic, Sumire reminds Mayu that she has enjoyed making others happy with her creations since she was young. When the hamster Garugaru attacks and shrinks Wonderful, Friendy, and Nyammy, they cannot fight it and are forced to flee along with Satoru. Nyammy begs Mayu to flee and save herself, but she refuses, declaring that she wants to protect her and her friends. Her resolve resonates with the Mirror Stone and causes her compact to turn into the Shiny Cats Pact, allowing her to transform into Cure Lillian. She purifies the Garugaru to its original form as the Kirarin Hamster, restoring the Cures to their normal size, and Komugi and Iroha return it to Niko Garden. Afterwards, Mayu and Yuki reconcile.
20	"Together, We're Not Scared"; Transliteration: "Futari Nara Kowakunai" (Japanese: 二人ならこわくない)	Koji Ogawa	Junko Komura	Yukiko Ueda and Keisuke Katayama	Xu Zhuxing	June 16, 2024
With Mayu having become Cure Lillian, the group heads to Niko Garden to introduce her and Yuki to Mey Mey. When he asks them to help save the Niko and Kirarin Animals, while Mayu agrees to help, Yuki refuses, saying that she only cares about protecting Mayu, and leaves. When the Kirarin Fawn and the other Kirarin Animals find her, she is worried that they will hate her for harming them when they were Garugaru, but they are instead happy that she is a Cure and can aid in saving the Animals. As she talks to them, she realizes that the Garugaru are like her when she first met Mayu, as she was alone and scared. When a fox Garugaru attacks, Nyammy prepares to attack it, but after seeing that it is in pain, decides to save it with Lillian instead. Their resolve causes their Pacts to summon the Amity Ribbon Tambourine, which they use to purify the Garugaru with Amity Lumiere, returning it to its original form as the Kirarin Fox. Afterwards, Yuki declares that she will fight alongside the Cures, but only if she gets to attend school with Mayu.
21	"Mayu and Yuki's School Life"; Transliteration: "Mayu to Yuki no Sukūru Raifu" (Japanese: まゆとユキのスクールライフ)	Emi Tezuka	Mio Inoue	Nobuhito Akada, Kenji Miuma, and Yukiko Ueda	Natsuko Tosugi	June 23, 2024
Yuki transfers to Second Wangan Junior High under the guise of being Mayu's cousin and soon becomes popular among the students for her skills, but she refuses to work with Komugi and Iroha and refuses to participate in school activities, such as being offered to join the drama club unless Mayu does it with her. Later, when the group works on embroidery and plans to exchange their embroidery, Yuki refuses to participate in the exchange, revealing that at Mayu's old school, she was friends with Chiran Yuuma, whom she wanted to make a handkerchief with a design of her pet chinchilla for her birthday. However, she was so focused on making the handkerchief that Yuuma thought she was ignoring her and stopped being friends with her. As a result, Yuki does not want Mayu to make friends so that she will not be hurt again. When a panda Garugaru attacks and causes the students, including Satoru, to fall asleep, the Cures use his suggestion of how pandas like to play with tires by using the Kirarin Fox's power to transform Komugi into a tire, allowing them to tire it out by having it chase her. After Nyammy and Lillian purify it and return it to its original form as the Kirarin Panda, after which it returns to Niko Garden, the group exchanges their embroidery, and Yuki begins to warm up to them.
22	"Wonderful Go~!"; Transliteration: "Wandafuru Go~!" (Japanese: わんだふるご～！)	Deko Akao	Directed by : Takao Iwai; Storyboarded by : Shinji Itadaki	Keiko Yamamoto, Han Seung-hee, Xiao Yuting, Du Lingui, Ami Konishi, and Fumi Nasuno	Miki Azuma	June 30, 2024
Komugi and Iroha's friend Inuzuka, who works as a dog trainer, invites them to try dog agility by navigating an obstacle course, with Mayu, Yuki, Satoru, and Daifuku watching. Although Inuzuka and her dog, a Border Collie named Witt, demonstrate the course, Komugi goes through the obstacles incorrectly. Despite this, Inuzuka believes that Komugi has potential and that she and Iroha need to deepen their bond to perform better on the course. However, as she and Iroha prepare to try the course again, a squirrel Garugaru attacks, but the Cures can purify it and return it to Niko Garden through a combination of Wonderful and Friendy's teamwork and Nyammy using the Kirarin Panda's power to put it to sleep. Afterwards, as the Cures walk home together, although Yuki is unwilling to run with Komugi, Komugi is happy to have gotten closer to Iroha.
23	"Making Wishes! Waon!"; Transliteration: "Negaigoto wa Waon" (Japanese: 願い事はワォ～～～～～ン)	Ayaka Noro	Yoshimi Narita	Yuka Takemori, Natsumi Sakai, and Mika Hironaka	Yuki Nakabayashi	July 7, 2024
During the night of Animal Town's Star Festival, Komugi has a dream in which she is standing in front of the Mirror Stone, which is shining, and hears a wolf howling, and wonders if it is crying. On the day of the festival, Yuki reveals her ability to transform into a human to Sumire, who is surprised but accepts it. At the festival, the Cures and Satoru have fun together, with Mayu noticing Satoru's feelings for Iroha and him asking her to keep it a secret. Later, they visit a shrine where their classmate Karasuma, who is helping out with the festival, explains to them that the statues there were placed to mourn animals that had died. She also reveals that there were once many Japanese wolves who inhabited the area, but they went extinct due to hunting and disease, and that there is another shrine, Toboe Shrine, deeper in the mountains, which has a wolf statue. As the festival begins and they prepare to write down their wishes to place on the Mirror Stone, Komugi is initially unsure what her wish is, but eventually decides on one. However, as they prepare to do so, a swan Garugaru attacks, but Wonderful and Friendy purify it with Friend Liberale, returning it to its original form as the Kirarin Swan. Afterwards, as Komugi reveals her wish, which is for everyone to be friends, the mysterious wolf villain is seen at Toboe Shrine.
24	"A Very Strange Egg"; Transliteration: "Fushigi Sugiru Tamago" (Japanese: 不思議すぎるたまご)	Hideki Hiroshima	Directed by : Mio Inoue; Storyboarded by : Noriyo Sasaki	Hiroshi Numata and Joey Calangian	Xu Zhuxing, Rika Uehara, and Daigoro Yamaguchi	July 14, 2024
At Niko Garden, with all the Kirarin Animals having returned, their combined power restores the Niko Diamond. The Diamond's light repairs the damage done to the Garden, restoring it to its original state, and a mysterious egg appears, which Mey Mey and the Kirarin Animals recognize as being Niko. However, despite the Garden being restored, the Cures learn that not all of the Niko Animals have returned, as the mother of a gorilla is still missing. Although he does not know why Niko has returned in the form of an egg, Mey Mey decides to take care of the egg until it hatches. However, when it repeatedly goes to Iroha's house despite his attempts to keep it in Niko Garden, the Cures and Satoru decide to take care of it instead. When a gorilla Garugaru attacks, which the Cures identify as being the mother gorilla, Nyammy uses the Kirarin Swan's power to reach her. She can get through to her after showing her the branch her child had been playing with, and she and Lillian purify her with Amity Lumiere and return her to Niko Garden. After reuniting the gorilla with her child, Iroha and Komugi return to Iroha's house, where they agree that the egg is mysterious after seeing that it has returned there again.
25	"Summer! Beach! Homework!"; Transliteration: "Natsu da! Umi da! Shukudai da!" (Japanese: 夏だ！海だ！宿題だ！)	Mitsutaka Noshitani	Directed by : Shinji Itadaki; Storyboarded by : Deko Akao	Keiko Yamato, Han Seung-hee, Akira Takeuchi, Yoshie Anzai, Shin'ya Nogami, Du Lingui & Xiao Yuting	Ryūta Hayashi	July 21, 2024
For their independent research project, the Cures, along with Satoru, go to Animal Town's beach to study sea turtles and how they lay their eggs. However, since sea turtles lay their eggs at night, they decide to spend the day at the beach until then. When a sea turtle Garugaru attacks, it takes Lillian with it as she clings to its back. As the Cures go after it, Yuki is initially afraid of being without Mayu, but overcomes her fear to save her and protect the sea turtle eggs, which are in danger of not hatching due to the cold temperature. After Wonderful and Friendy purify the Garugaru with Friend Liberale and return it to Niko Garden, the Cures and Satoru watch a sea turtle lay its eggs.
26	"It's Dangerously Hot!"; Transliteration: "Atsu Sugite Yabai!" (Japanese: 暑すぎてヤバい！)	Yūya Nomoto	Misuzu Chiba	Mitsuru Aoyama	Shota Suzuki	July 28, 2024
As Komugi and Iroha go for a walk and Mayu and Yuki go shopping to get more embroidery thread, they struggle due to the heat caused by a heat wave. They soon run into Satoru, who invites them to his house, where they recover and have lunch. As they leave, a camel Garugaru attacks and the Cures struggle to fight it in the heat. Lillian uses the power of the Kirarin Penguin to cover the area with ice, cooling them off and weakening the Garugaru. After Wonderful and Friendy purify the Garugaru and return it to Niko Garden, the next day Komugi and Iroha go for a walk before sunrise to avoid the heat, while Mayu and Yuki go shopping again, as Mayu had forgotten to following the battle with the Garugaru.
27	"We Want To Find A Tsuchinoko!"; Transliteration: "Tsuchinoko ni Aitai!" (Japanese: ツチノコに会いた～い！)	Takao Iwai	Directed by : Shinji Itadaki; Storyboarded by : Sawako Hirabayashi	Makoto Ozawa and Noel Ano-Nuevo	Natsuko Tosugi	August 4, 2024
The Cures and Satoru participate in a competition held by Animal Town's mayor, Washio, in which the goal is to find a tsuchinoko. As they stop for lunch, Mey Mey comes to check on Niko's egg, which Komugi had brought with her, but accidentally drops it down a hole. The Cures use the Kirarin Hamster's power to shrink and enter the hole, where a tsuchinoko Garugaru swallows Niko's egg and attacks them. It turns them to stone with its gaze, but Nyammy avoids being petrified because her fear of snakes causes her to be too afraid to look at it. With help from Satoru, who digs a hole to let sunlight in, reversing the petrification and weakening the Garugaru, Nyammy and Lillian purify it with Amity Lumiere and return it to Niko Garden. Afterwards, while the Cures and Satoru are disappointed that they did not find a tsuchinoko, Yuki is frightened after seeing a creature resembling one.
28	"Let's Play At The Ookuma Farm"; Transliteration: "Ōkuma Bokujō de Asobo" (Japanese: 大熊牧場で遊ぼ)	Kana Shinohara	Misuzu Chiba	Ragi Kuon	Yuki Nakabayashi	August 11, 2024
The Cures and Satoru visit their classmate Okuma's house, a farm run by her family. There, they visit the animals and try out farming as part of a stamp rally to win souvenirs. Mey Mey, who came to the farm with Niko's egg since Satoru told him about the visit, goes with Okuma while they participate in the rally, which includes milking cows to make ice cream and interacting with pigs, horses, and alpacas. At the sheepdog show, Mey Mey, who is among the sheep being herded by the sheepdog Andy, reunites with the Cures as an alpaca Garugaru attacks. After Wonderful and Friendy purify it with Friend Liberale and return it to Niko Garden, they complete the rally and receive sets of stickers as souvenirs, followed by deciding to visit again soon.
29	"Nice To Meet You, Niko-sama!"; Transliteration: "Hajimemashite Niko-sama!" (Japanese: はじめましてニコ様！)	Morio Hatano	Yoshimi Narita	Hitomi Matsuura	Xu Zhuxing	August 18, 2024
In the morning, Komugi is awoken by Niko's egg shining and discovers that it has cracked. Along with the Cures, Satoru, and Mey Mey, they go to the dog run, where the egg hatches and Niko emerges from it. As they introduce themselves to her, she is upset that others know of Niko Garden's existence, but is happy that the Cures have been rescuing its animals. They go with her to Niko Garden, where its inhabitants welcome her back and she reveals to them that Gaou, the leader of a pack of wolves, was responsible for attacking Niko Garden and turning the animals into Garugaru. While she used her power to seal them in eggs and stop them from rampaging, the eggs were transformed into Garugaru eggs, and she was transformed into an egg. Meanwhile, Gaou senses Niko's reawakening and the presence of light and resurrects his companions Torame and Zakuro, ordering them to act in his stead while he regains his power. They find a Garugaru egg and Torame awakens it, summoning a new, more powerful type of Garugaru called a Gaogaon. The monkey Gaogaon attacks the Cures and they are overwhelmed as it splits into four and Friend Liberale and Amity Lumiere fail to purify it. While Friendy tells Torame and Zakuro that she does not want to fight and wants to be friends, they refuse, telling her that the Japanese wolves went extinct because of humans. As Gaou orders them to retreat, Iroha becomes depressed and questions her desire to be friends with animals, even considering quitting the team.
30	"A Wonderful Castle!"; Transliteration: "Wandafuru na Kassuru!" (Japanese: わんだふるなキャッスル！)	Yutaka Tsuchida	Yoshimi Narita	Nishiki Itaoka	Miki Azuma	August 25, 2024
At the Mirror Stone, Niko reveals to Mey Mey that it is a piece of the Niko Diamond that she gave to the animals to grant their wish to be friends with humans. However, humans sought to use the Mirror Stone's power for themselves and drove the animals away, causing the wolves to go extinct. She also tells Mey Mey that she was unaware that the Niko Diamond could grant the Cures their powers and that, although he believes they can stop the Gaogaon's rampage, she will take away their powers and confront Gaou herself if they cannot. Meanwhile, at Friendly Animal Hospital & Salon and Pretty Holic, Iroha and Mayu are distraught after their loss to the Gaogaon. However, with encouragement from Komugi and Yuki, they regain their resolve, with Iroha changing her mind on quitting the team, and go to confront Torame after Satoru informs them that a wolf has been sighted heading down the mountain. There, Yuki suggests that they work as a team instead of two separate teams. As the Gaogaon overpowers them, Niko prepares to take their powers away, but Mey Mey stops her, reminding her of their efforts to save Niko Garden's inhabitants, and she agrees to use her power to help them after realizing that they have the same goal. This grants them the Diamond Ribbon Castle and the power of their Diamond Ribbon Styles, allowing them to use Eternal Bond Shower to purify the Gaogaon. After returning it to Niko Garden, Niko decides to stay in Animal Town and moves into Iroha's house.
31	"Nyanfluencer Mayu"; Transliteration: "Nyanfuruensā Mayu" (Japanese: ニャンフルエンサーまゆ)	Mitsutaka Noshitani	Directed by : Junko Komura; Storyboarded by : Shinji Itadaki	Keiko Yamamoto, Han Seung-hee, Keizou Shimizu, Eri Tokugawa, Akira Takeuchi, Xiao Yuting, and Du Lingui	Natsuko Tosugi	September 1, 2024
At Sumire's suggestion, Mayu begins posting pictures of Yuki to the Pretty Holic CureSta account to share her cuteness with others, which she agrees to do with Yuki's encouragement after worrying about the possibility of her and Pretty Holic being criticized because of the posts. As more customers come to Pretty Holic after seeing the posts, it attracts the attention of Mayu's former friend Yuuma, who learns that she lives in Animal Town, which is located near her town. As Zakuro arrives in Animal Town while planning to show animals that humans are the enemy, Yuuma also arrives there to visit Mayu and stops by Pretty Holic. Mayu almost ignores her again, but Yuki encourages her to talk to her and reconcile their friendship. However, as she plans to do so, Zakuro attacks and transforms Yuuma's chinchilla Kotetsu into a Gaogaon. As Lillian attempts to subdue it so they can purify it and reunite it with Yuuma, she realizes that when her and Yuuma's friendship ended, Kotetsu was there to support Yuuma, just as Yuki was there to support her. After purifying the Gaogaon with Eternal Bond Shower, Niko heals Kotetsu with her power and the Cures reunite it with Yuuma, but leave before she can thank them. Afterwards, Mayu and Yuuma reconcile their friendship, with Mayu giving her the handkerchief that she intended to give her for her birthday.
32	"Favorite Animal At The Zoo"; Transliteration: "Dōbutsuen no Oshi Animaru" (Japanese: 動物園の推しアニマル)	Koji Ogawa	Mio Inoue	Katsumi Tamegai and Yukiko Ueda	Yuki Nakabayashi	September 8, 2024
After remembering how she was afraid of an elephant when she visited the zoo with her parents as a child, Iroha decides that they should go to the zoo since she has not taken Komugi there, with Niko and Satoru going with them. However, Yuki is not excited to go to the zoo, only going because Mayu wanted to. At the zoo, they see various animals, including squirrel monkeys, kangaroos, deer, parrots, snakes, and rabbits, and Niko tries to get Yuki to smile and be happy, which is the reason that she came to Earth. At the safari area, they meet Sakura the elephant, who recognizes Iroha from their first meeting. Iroha explains to them that Sakura is gentle with other animals and that, although she was afraid of her when they first met, she befriended her after giving her a snack. However, they notice that Sakura is acting differently than usual. Later, as they are eating lunch and Satoru tells them about how zoos allow people to see animals for themselves instead of just reading about them, Zakuro arrives at the zoo and, enraged that humans are confining animals in zoos, transforms Sakura into a Gaogaon to attack the zoo. Although the Cures attempt to contain the Gaogaon with their barriers, it powers up and attacks the wall containing the animals. However, the zoo animals defend the wall, and Friendy gets through to Sakura, allowing the Cures to purify the Gaogaon with Eternal Bond Shower. Afterwards, the group decides that Sakura is their favorite animal at the zoo, with Iroha declaring that she will always love her.
33	"Full Animal Smiles"; Transliteration: "Marutto Animaru Sumairu" (Japanese: マルっとアニマルスマイル)	Kazuya Kitō	Deko Akao	Yuuki Kitajima	Xu Zhuxing	September 15, 2024
At Friendly Animal Hospital & Salon, Tsuyoshi has finished trimming Witt and is ready to call out Moca from the dog run to be trimmed. However, after seeing her playing with Komugi, he decides to trim Yuki's claws instead and gives Mayu advice on how to trim her claws better. Afterwards, he tries to call Moca with his "Smile Voice", which Iroha tells Mayu is to avoid scaring dogs by speaking in a high and gentle voice instead of a deep voice, but Moca does not listen. Moca's owner tells Tsuyoshi that she has trouble washing her fur, which has become dirty from playing, because it has grown long, and he tries to befriend Moca by playing with her and Komugi. While they play, Satoru, who came to the Salon to have Daifuku's claws trimmed, decides to come to Iroha's room while they wait and asks her how Tsuyoshi became an animal trimmer, but she does not know. Youko and Mey Mey bring them snacks and tea and she tells them that she met Tsuyoshi in the off-leash area of Kaihin Park, as he came there every day and dreamed of becoming an animal trimmer. However, animals did not want to be near him because of his deep voice, so he decided to make his face, heart, and voice a "full smile" to avoid scaring them. After meeting him, she asked him to join her in running an animal clinic with a salon in town, as she felt his skills as a trimmer were ideal for the job. As Tsuyoshi prepares to trim Moca, Torame attacks and summons a pig Gaogaon; as the Cures struggle to keep up with it, Satoru suggests that they lure it to the muddy area by the river, since pigs and boars like to play in mud. After luring it to the mud with Tsuyoshi's "full smile" technique, they purify the Gaogaon with Eternal Bond Shower and return it to Niko Garden, after which they and Satoru return to the Salon. There, Tsuyoshi had finished trimming Moca and Komugi, and Yuki – along with Daifuku – ask their owners to brush them.
34	"Cat, Cat, Cat Meeting"; Transliteration: "Neko, Neko, Neko Shūgō" (Japanese: ねこ、ネコ、猫集会)	Hideki Hiroshima	Directed by : Misuzu Chiba; Storyboarded by : Ryota Kawahara	Yuka Takemori, Nobuhito Akada, Reggie Manabat, and Joey Calangian	Shota Suzuki	September 22, 2024
Mayu's father, Takayuki, returns home from abroad to display his photos of animals at a photo exhibition. As Mayu helps at the reception desk, she tells Komugi, Iroha, and Satoru that Yuki did not attend the exhibition because she wanted to be alone. Yuki, though worried about how Mayu will do on her own, decides that she will be fine with her friends and goes out into Animal Town to do things that she has wanted to try, such as going to a cafe, watching a movie, and smelling flowers. While at the park, she reunites a kitten with its mother after rescuing it from a group of crows and attends the cat meeting, which she learns is for exchanging information. The Cures and Satoru head out to search for Yuki when Zakuro attacks and transforms the leader cat into a Gaogaon. Lillian uses the Kirarin Fox's power to transform Nyammy into a cat toy and distract the Gaogaon, allowing the Cures to purify it with Eternal Bond Shower. Later, at home, Mayu asks Yuki to tell her about her day.
35	"Operation: Satoru's Love Confession"; Transliteration: "Satoru no Kokuhaku Sakusen" (Japanese: 悟の告白作戦)	Yuuna Hirosue	Sawako Hirabayashi	Mika Hironaka	Natsuko Tosugi	September 29, 2024
At school, Mayu and Yuki witness a student confessing her feelings for Satoru, but he rejects her. Although he tries to deny his feelings for Iroha, they figure that he has rejected previous confessions because he only has feelings for her and does not want to ruin their friendship by confessing. Iroha tells the Cures and Satoru about Keiji, a client who is coming to her house and whom they assume is her lover. At her house, however, they learn that Keiji is a dog and that his owner, Keiichi, is training him to pass a test and become a police dog. Satoru, jealous that Iroha and Keiichi are getting along, leaves, and Mayu and Yuki decide to help him confess his feelings to Iroha. They go to Niko Garden to help him learn about animal courtship, and he reveals that he and Iroha are childhood friends and first met when he brought Daifuku to Friendly Animal Hospital & Salon for treatment after he was attacked by a snake. Wanting to connect with her love for animals, he dedicated himself to learning more about them. When Torame attacks and summons a kangaroo Gaogaon, the Cures purify it with Satoru's advice and return it to Niko Garden. Afterwards, Satoru is about to confess to Iroha when Mey Mey accidentally reveals that he loves her.
36	"A Special Kind Of Wonderful"; Transliteration: "Tokubetsu na Wandafuru" (Japanese: 特別なワンダフル)	Tsuyoshi Tobita	Directed by : Yoshimi Narita; Storyboarded by : Hanako Ueda	Akira Inagami, Yoko Furuya, and Yukiko Nakatani	Yuki Nakabayashi	October 6, 2024
Satoru confesses to Iroha, and Komugi learns that there are different kinds of love, including platonic and romantic. However, Iroha, surprised by his confession, runs off, and Mayu and Yuki follow her, while Satoru believes that she has turned him down and does not like him romantically. At Friendly Animal Hospital & Salon, Mayu tells Iroha about the difference between platonic and romantic love, and Iroha, with Youko's help, concludes that she is happier when she is with her friends. Meanwhile, Niko tells Satoru that Daifuku says he should be true to himself and confess instead of hesitating because he worries about how Iroha will feel. That night, Iroha cannot sleep as she worries about the difference between a "special feeling" and her love for Komugi. The next day at school, Satoru tells Iroha to forget about what he said and that they should remain friends, but Yuki encourages Iroha to tell him about her feelings. However, as she prepares to do so, Zakuro, angry that couples are being happy after Gaou has been ignoring her, transforms a black kite into a Gaogaon to attack the beach and captures Satoru. Friendy uses the Kirarin Swan's power to pursue them while resolving that she wants to help Satoru as he has helped her. After rescuing him, they purify the Gaogaon with Eternal Bond Shower and return it to Niko Garden. Afterwards, Iroha tells Satoru that she feels a "special kind of wonderful" when she is with him, a different feeling than the "wonderful" feeling she has when she is with Komugi and her friends, and they are happy to know that their feelings are mutual.
37	"A First Date With Everyone!?"; Transliteration: "Min'na de Hatsu Dēto!?" (Japanese: みんなで初デート！？)	Emi Tezuka	Mio Inoue	Mitsuru Aoyama	Xu Zhuxing	October 13, 2024
At Friendly Animal Hospital & Salon, Iroha prepares for her first date with Satoru. Although Tsuyoshi is reluctant for them to go out, he accepts it after realizing that they have a common interest in animals. When Iroha meets Satoru at the Mirror Stone, he worries that what he has planned for their date is no different than what they would do as friends, and Mayu and Yuki take Komugi with them, while Mey Mey and Niko take Daifuku so they will not interfere with the date. However, Mey Mey, worried that their dates will interfere with Iroha's duties as a Pretty Cure and his and Satoru's friendship, secretly follows them. Iroha and Satoru do various activities, including visiting a walking course, a flower garden, and a farm, but are nervous around each other. Meanwhile, Mayu, Yuki, and Komugi go shopping and visit a café, where they see Iroha and Satoru going to the aquarium. At the aquarium, Iroha admits to Satoru that she thought that going on dates would be as fun as the time they spent together as friends, but instead has caused her to be nervous. However, Satoru reassures her, telling her that spending time together had made him happy. When Torame summons a giraffe Gaogaon to attack the café, the Cures struggle to fight it without Iroha until she returns from her date. After purifying the Gaogaon with Eternal Bond Shower and returning it to Niko Garden, Iroha asks Satoru to call her by her name, which he accepts.
38	"The Place Komugi Calls Home"; Transliteration: "Komugi no Kaeru Basho" (Japanese: こむぎの帰る場所)	Tomoki Watanabe	Directed by : Misuzu Chiba; Storyboarded by : Shinji Itadaki	Ken Ueno	Shota Suzuki	October 20, 2024
At Friendly Animal Hospital & Salon, a woman sees Komugi playing with Iroha and recognizes her as Marron, a dog who went missing two years ago. She introduces herself as Ayako Yuuki, who works with a group of volunteers who care for people's pets when they are hospitalized or unable to care for them. Two years ago, Komugi's previous owner was placed in a nursing home and was taken to an animal shelter. However, she escaped someday and could not be found despite searching for her. Although Iroha wants to visit him, she is afraid that her former family will want her back and that Komugi will not remember them, since she does not remember anything from before she met Iroha. The next day, the group visits the nursing home to see him and meets him in the courtyard, where he introduces himself as Kurihara. While spending time with him, Komugi begins to remember more of their time together. Iroha tells him that she wants him to take Komugi back, as when she rescued Komugi, she promised her mother that she would return her to her former family if they found them, but Komugi wants to stay with Iroha. When Torame summons a stoat Gaogaon, the Cures struggle to keep up with it due to its speed. With the power of the Kirarin Rabbit's ears, Wonderful can detect the Gaogaon's location, allowing the Cures to corner it. After purifying it with Eternal Bond Shower and returning it to Niko Garden, Kurihara asks Iroha to continue taking care of Komugi, while Niko watches them in her human form.
39	"Niko Evolution!"; Transliteration: "Niko Eboryūshon!" (Japanese: ニコエボリューション！)	Takao Iwai	Directed by : Yoshimi Narita; Storyboarded by : Shinji Itadaki	Makoto Ozawa and Noel Año-Nuevo	Natsuko Tosugi	October 27, 2024
On Halloween, the residents of Animal Town have dressed up to go trick-or-treating, including the Cures, Satoru and Daifuku, and their friends and classmates. As Niko, in her human form, watches the festival, Gaou leaves for Animal Town after sensing human laughter and happiness, with Zakuro following after him after realizing that he has awakened. When people come to Iroha's house for trick-or-treating, the diamond on Niko's horn begins to glow, and she reveals that she has regained her strength through the Nikoniko Power of the people and animals of Animal Town. Upon taking a group photo to celebrate the festival, Komugi, who has dressed up as a wolf, sees a man dressed as a wolf and follows him to the riverside, but becomes tired and returns to her dog form. There, the man gives her water, and she notes that he is kind and loved by animals like Iroha. When the Cures and Satoru, who were looking for Komugi, arrive, they realize that he is Gaou while he realizes that they are the Pretty Cure who have been purifying the Garugaru and Gaogaon. He disables the Cures' Pacts using a shard of the Niko Diamond, which he stole and corrupted when he attacked Niko Garden, while revealing that he used the Diamond's power to transform its inhabitants into Garugaru. Niko arrives to confront him, revealing her human form to the Cures, and attempts to reason with him, stating that, like him, she once thought humans were cruel, but that her experiences in Animal Town have taught her that not all humans are like this. However, he rejects this, declaring that he only seeks revenge in the name of his fellow wolves and believes that humans will inevitably betray animals. He transforms Komugi into a Gaogaon, but she returns to normal after hearing Iroha's voice. After purifying a bat that Zakuro had transformed into a Gaogaon with an upgraded version of Eternal Bond Shower using Niko's power, Komugi attempts to speak with Gaou, but he leaves with Zakuro.
40	"The Great Wan-Nyan Incident"; Transliteration: "Wan Nyan dai Jiken" (Japanese: ワンニャン大事件)	Mitsutaka Noshitani	Directed by : Sawako Hirabayashi; Storyboarded by : Shinji Itadaki	Keiko Yamamoto, Akira Takeuchi, Yoshie Anzai, Shin'ya Nogami, Du Lingui, Xiao Yuting, Mai Ishii, Karen Nishiyama, and Han Seung-hee	Midori Tanaka & Yuko Doi	November 10, 2024
The Cures, along with Satoru, Niko, and Mey Mey, go to Toboe Shrine, which was built to honor the extinct wolves, in search of Gaou. Although they can sense his presence and that he has been there recently, he is not there. Niko attempts to use her power to sense Gaou's presence, but her power, still unstable, goes out of control and transforms Iroha into a dog and Mayu into a cat. Though Niko can transform them back to normal, she must wait for her Nikoniko Power to return, and the group decides to use the opportunity to have fun while creating more Nikoniko Power. As Torame leaves to have fun alone, they play at the off-leash area, allowing Niko's Nikoniko Power to return. When Torame attacks and summons a frog Gaogaon by the riverside, Niko returns Iroha and Mayu to normal. Taking advantage of the fact that it only reacts to moving objects, the Cures corner the Gaogaon before purifying it with Eternal Bond Shower. After returning it to Niko Garden, Torame tells the Cures that he had fun before leaving and they head home, with Iroha and Mayu being happy to have experienced life as an animal. Satoru agrees to Niko's suggestion of transforming him into a rabbit, but realizes that he will not be able to return to normal for some time. As such, the group heads off to the park to play until her Nikoniko Power returns.
41	"Yuki On Stage"; Transliteration: "Yuki On Sutēji!" (Japanese: ユキ・オンステージ！)	Kazuki Yokouchi	Mio Inoue	Seiji Masuda	Yuki Nakabayashi	November 17, 2024
At school, Tanukihara and Kitsunezaki ask Yuki to join the drama club and participate in Animal Town's drama festival, but she refuses. Although they had planned to do a production of Romeo and Juliet, Karasuma gives Satoru a diary that she found in the Mirror Stone Shrine's storeroom. Written 150 years ago, it describes how a man named Subaru befriended and helped an injured wolf, who was the leader of the wolves in the area, and was reunited with it after it helped him when he got lost while fishing. After hearing this, Kitsunezaki decides to make a new play: Wolfen, The Wolf King, about the friendship between the human Pleiades and the wolf Wolfen. However, since they do not have the time or resources to complete the production in time for the festival, they enlist the Cures' help, with Satoru teaching the production about wolves, Mayu making costumes, and Komugi and Yuki acting. During the play, which follows Wolfen as he befriends Pleiades and becomes human through the forest goddess' power to help him stop the lord of his village, who plans to build his castle on the village and mountain, Zakuro transforms a boy's chameleon into a Gaogaon. Niko takes Yuki's role in the play while the Cures confront the Gaogaon. After using the Kirarin Fox's power to transform Komugi into a makeup brush to make the Gaogaon visible, the Cures purify it with Eternal Bond Shower before returning to the play. Despite the ending deviating from the planned ending of Pleiades and Wolfen separating due to Komugi's belief that humans and wolves can be friends, the play is a success.
42	"Everyone's Wonderful Pets!"; Transliteration: "Min'na no Ouchi no Wandafuru!" (Japanese: みんなのおうちのワンダフル！)	Kana Shirohara	Directed by : Deko Akao; Storyboarded by : Kana Shirohara	Hitomi Matsuura	Xu Zhuxing	November 24, 2024
Mayor Washio asks Takayuki to photograph people's pets for the yearly animal calendar, and the Cures and Satoru decide to show him around Animal Town so that he can take pictures. Starting at Kaihin Park, he explains his method of photography: since animals can be difficult to capture on camera, he chooses a location and then waits to capture the "moment" he wants to treasure. During the tour, he takes photos of Otsuru's dog Fuku at Kaihin Park, people's dogs and Daifuku at the off-leash area, swans by the lake, cows at Okuma's farm, a whale by the beach, Torieda's cockatiel Pea, Kanie's crabs Zuwai and Taraba, and Babazono's horse Bruno. While stopping at the cafe, Takayuki tells the group to look through the photos while he goes shopping with Sumire. However, as they are doing so, Torame attacks and summons a zebra Gaogaon. After using the Kirarin Lion's power to catch up to it, the Cures purify it with Eternal Bond Shower and return it to Niko Garden. Afterwards, Washio gives Takayuki the calendar, which has the theme of "everyone smiling", and thanks him for his help.
43	"Feelings Spun Together"; Transliteration: "Tsumugareru Omoi" (Japanese: つむがれる思い)	Yutaka Tsuchida	Misuzu Chiba	Katsumi Tamegai and Hiroshi Numata	Shota Suzuki	December 1, 2024
At school, Mayu's classmates ask her to make them scarves after seeing that she and Yuki have matching scarves, but she instead decides to teach them how to knit since they do not know how. Although she doubts that she can teach them, Yuki reassures her, telling her that her creations have brought people together and made them happy. After going to Niko Garden to get materials, the class begins, and Zakuro, who has been watching them, decides to make something hand-knit for Gaou. Meanwhile, Satoru works on translating Subaru's diary, believing that the information it contains could help the Cures. On their way home from class, Mayu and Yuki encounter Zakuro, who Mayu teaches how to knit. However, she is angered after Yuki asks why Gaou is harming animals when she says that he cares for them. Meanwhile, Satoru finishes translating the diary, revealing that the wolf Subaru befriended was Gaou. Though he sought for wolves and humans to coexist, they were separated after the villagers discovered their friendship and forbade him from going to Mt. Toboe. Zakuro transforms a crab into a Gaogaon to attack, but Lillian subdues it with her net after resolving that her friends have given her strength. After putting it to sleep with the Kirarin Panda's power, the Cures purify it with Eternal Bond Shower. Afterwards, Zakuro retreats despite the Cures attempts to reason with her, and they resolve to get through to Gaou after Satoru informs them of what he learned.
44	"Lots of Happiness"; Transliteration: "Takusan no Shiawase" (Japanese: たくさんの幸せ)	Yūya Nomoto	Mio Inoue	Yuka Takemori, Nobuhito Akada, Natsumi Sakai, and Mika Hironaka	Natsuko Tosugi	December 8, 2024
While going out, Komugi and Iroha encounter Otsuru, who is taking her dog – Fuku – to Friendly Animal Hospital & Salon for a check-up after their walk. Although she does not know her birthday, next Saturday will mark eighteen years since she was adopted. Iroha decides to celebrate Fuku, with Mayu making a patchwork blanket for Fuku and Yuki decorating and handing out invitations. At Otsuru's house, the Cures learn that, after her previous dog, Suzu, died while she was in high school, she swore that she would never adopt another dog so as not to be sad when they died. However, while she, Okame, and Oshika were helping out at an event to get rescue dogs adopted by matching them with families, she met Fuku, who was afraid of people, and decided to adopt her. As she prepares to take Fuku to Friendly Animal Hospital & Salon, Torame attacks and summons a Tyrannosaurus Gaogaon. However, after learning from Otsuru that Fuku does not have much time left to live, he orders the Gaogaon to stop attacking, allowing the Cures to purify it with Eternal Bond Shower. After returning it to Niko Garden, at Friendly Animal Hospital & Salon, Fuku dies after saying goodbye to Otsuru, and, though she thanks the Cures for being there for her, Iroha is distraught over her death and concerned for her future with Komugi.
45	"Friends Forever"; Transliteration: "Zutto Zutto Tomodachi" (Japanese: ずっとずっと友達)	Koji Ogawa	Yoshimi Narita	Akira Inagami and Kenji Miuma	Yuki Nakabayashi	December 15, 2024
At the off-leash area, Iroha is still distraught over Fuku's death. However, Mey Mey soon contacts the Cures, informing them that, although all the Niko Animals have been returned to Niko Garden, they must deal with Gaou, Torame, and Zakuro. While the Cures and Satoru notice Iroha's sadness and think of how to cheer her up, Torame searches for a Garugaru egg to summon. However, as Iroha encounters Otsuru at the Mirror Stone Shrine, where she had Fuku enshrined, he is upset and howls. They confront him and, upon learning from Iroha that there are no more Garugaru eggs, he instead decides to play with them, during which he remembers how he used to play with the members of the wolf pack. Afterwards, he asks Iroha if she still wants to be friends with him, but she reaffirms her desire to befriend all animals. With his anger and regrets gone, he asks the Cures to purify him with Eternal Bond Shower, which returns him to his original form as a statue at Toboe Shrine. The Cures embrace Iroha, who, along with Komugi, returns the statue to Toboe Shrine.
46	"Meeeerry Christmas!"; Transliteration: "Meeeri Kurisumasu!" (Japanese: メェェェリィクリスマス！)	Takao Iwai	Directed by : Ryūta Kawahara; Storyboarded by : Sawako Hirabayashi	Mitsuru Aoyama	Xu Zhuxing	December 22, 2024
The night before Niko Garden's Christmas party, Yuki has a dream of when she was a kitten alone in the snow. On the day of the party, Yuki claims that she does not want to go, but Mayu tells her that the fact that she got ready for the party shows that she cares. During the party, Satoru reveals to Mayu that he got Iroha a present for their first Christmas together, but plans to give it to her later when they are alone. He gives Iroha the gift, a dog charm with a design of Komugi, while Iroha gives him a scarf with a design of Daifuku. After watching the Kirarin Animals' talent show and Niko's performance, the Cures and Satoru return home, and Komugi and Yuki attend the cat gathering. Meanwhile, Zakuro resolves to stay with Gaou until the end and heads to Animal Town in search of an animal to transform into a Gaogaon. On their way home, Komugi and Yuki encounter Zakuro and tell her about the beauty of Christmas trees. When the Cures and Satoru arrive along with Mey Mey, who promised to help Santa with delivering presents, she transforms the head reindeer into a Gaogaon. While fighting the Gaogaon and protecting the Christmas tree, Yuki tells Zakuro that they are the same because they both have something they want to protect. Though she initially only wanted to protect Mayu, she now knows that there are many kinds of creatures living in this world, a world that she thinks suits Zakuro. Upon purifying the Gaogaon with Eternal Bond Shower, the Cures invite Zakuro to the Christmas party, but she refuses due to not wanting to abandon Gaou. Afterwards, the Cures help Niko, who is revealed to be friends with Santa, deliver presents, and Yuki reflects on how her friends have made her life better when she was once alone.
47	"A Gaou New Year"; Transliteration: "Akemashite Gaō" (Japanese: あけましてガオウ)	Hideki Hiroshima	Directed by : Deko Akao; Storyboarded by : Shinji Itadaki	Han Seung-hee, Keiko Yamamoto, Akira Takeuchi, Mai Ishii, and Noel Ano-Nuevo	Shota Suzuki	January 5, 2025
At the shore, where Iroha is taking Komugi for their first run of the year, the Cures and Satoru wish each other a happy new year. Wanting to celebrate the new year, they partake in various festivities, including Animal Menko, flying kites, and visiting the Mirror Stone Shrine. While out, they receive a call from Ohkuma, who informs them that a cow is about to give birth and that they should come see the baby and get a charm from Karasuma to ensure a safe birth. They also encounter Kanie and Saruwatani and Sumire and Takayuki, who are taking photos, and get amazake sold by Otsuru, Okama, and Oshika. Meanwhile, at Iroha's house, Yoko and Tsuyoshi have made miso, soy sauce broth, and grilled mochi. As the Cures and Satoru leave to make their resolutions at the shrine, Gaou attacks Animal Town to avenge the death of his pack, awakening an egg statue at Toboe Shrine and transforming it into a wolf Gaogaon. Though Zakuro tells him that destroying Animal Town will not revive his pack or bring him happiness and that she wants him to be happy, he insists that he does not need happiness and will not stop until he has avenged them. While confronting Zakuro and the Gaogaon, Nyammy and Lillian notice Zakuro's pain and tell her that she does not have to fight, but she insists that she must because it is what Gaou wants. However, after she confesses that Gaou is her friend, the Cures realize that she is the same as them because they both care for their friends. Though they purify the Gaogaon with Eternal Bond Shower and return it to its original form, Zakuro tells them that the battle is not over yet as Gaou arrives in Animal Town with an army of Gaogaon.
48	"Gaou's Friends"; Transliteration: "Gaō no tomodachi" (Japanese: ガオウの友達)	Yuna Hirosue	Directed by : Yoshimi Narita; Storyboarded by : Kuramu Bon	Nishiki Itaoka	Natsuko Tosugi	January 12, 2025
While the Cures fight the Gaogaons, Niko confronts Gaou directly and attempts to reason with him, saying that, despite his desire for revenge on humans, the humans and animals of Animal Town are not the same as the ones he knew. However, he insists that there is no difference and attacks her, draining her of the Niko Diamond's power and reverting her to her unicorn form. With the last of her strength, she shatters Gaou's mask, revealing him to be Subaru. He reveals that, following the death of Gaou and his pack, and later himself, his soul lay dormant at Toboe Shrine until he revived himself with a wolf claw and vowed to avenge the wolves on their behalf. Using the Niko Diamond's power, he causes the forest to overrun Animal Town so that nature can reclaim it, forcing the Cures, Satoru, Mey Mey, and Niko to retreat. Zakuro confronts the Cures, revealing that she knew Gaou was Subaru, but followed him because of his friendship with the wolves. However, after they reason with her by saying that Subaru was her friend, she agrees to work with them and has them purify the Gaogaons with Eternal Bond Shower, returning them to their original form as egg statues. Afterwards, Zakuro agrees to help them save Subaru, but they are forced to flee to above Animal Town as it is completely overrun by nature.
49	"Your Voice"; Transliteration: "Anata no koe" (Japanese: あなたの声)	Morio Hatano	Yoshimi Narita	Ragi Kuon	Xu Zhuxing	January 19, 2025
In a flashback, Subaru, along with Torame and Zakuro, head to the summit of Mt. Toboe, where he informs Gaou of the villagers' decision to send hunters to kill the wolves. In the present, Subaru attempts to revive Gaou and his pack by combining Niko's power with the Mirror Stone to make a wish. However, after Niko informs him that neither she nor the Mirror Stone can bring back the dead, he shatters the Stone and fuses with the Niko Diamond, transforming into a monstrous wolf, even as she warns him that he will fade away without its power. While fighting him, Wonderful is killed protecting Friendy, reminding Subaru of Gaou's death. Zakuro arrives, revealing that, in the past, Subaru was staying with the wolves to protect them. However, after Gaou died protecting him, the pack split up, with Subaru sacrificing himself to protect the remaining wolves. While unconscious, Komugi meets with Gaou's spirit, who revives her. As Subaru begins to suffer from absorbing the Diamond's power and blames himself for Gaou's death, a fragment of the Stone grants Satoru and Daifuku their wishes to help the Cures and become human, respectively. After gaining Cure-like forms, they open the way for the Cures to enter Subaru's heart. Inside, Komugi confronts Subaru and tells him that Gaou has always loved him. Having gotten through to him, Subaru's hatred disappears, even as he questions why the Cures would want to save him after what he has done. After the Cures purify him with Eternal Bond Shower, he awakens in Animal Town and reunites with Gaou.
50	"Wonderful Forever!"; Transliteration: "Zutto Wandafuru!" (Japanese: ず~ っとわんだふる!)	Masanori Sato	Directed by : Yoshimi Narita; Storyboarded by : Masanori Sato, Hanako Ueda & Yoko Furuya	Yoko Uchida and Yoko Furuya	Shota Suzuki and Ryuta Hayashi	January 26, 2025
Subaru and Gaou reunite and reconcile, but Subaru apologizes, saying that he could not keep his promise and was unable to protect him, Gaou, who has gained the ability to speak through the Mirror Stone, tells him that he does not need to apologize, as he should instead apologize for causing him to suffer. Lillian points out that Gaou had been by Subaru's side, but he did not notice because his anger and hatred caused him to lose sight of what was important to him. Although Subaru believes that he is the reason why Gaou could not protect his pack, Gaou tells him that he is his friend as well. As Subaru and Gaou begin to fade away, the Cures, Satoru and Daifuku, and Niko embrace them in a group hug, and Gaou tells Subaru that he was glad to have met him. Along with Torame and Zakuro, who return to their original wolf form, they depart for the afterlife with the other wolves. Afterwards, although Mey Mey wants to host a farewell party at Niko Garden, Niko tells them that the two worlds should not intersect and takes back the Pacts before returning to Niko Garden. The next morning, life returns to normal, but Komugi, Yuki, and Daifuku have lost their ability to speak and transform into humans; Satoru theorizes that Animal Town was founded after Subaru's diary was discovered to fulfill his wish of humans and animals living together. At the dog run, while Mayu watches a video of an idol, she, Iroha, and Satoru reflect on their experiences since becoming Cures, and Iroha admits that she misses Komugi. The Mirror Stone reacts to their love for each other, restoring their ability to speak. Along with Mey Mey, who Niko permitted to visit Earth, they declare that life will be wonderful forever.
