= Witchy Pretty Cure!! Mirai Days =

2025 Japanese anime series

- Key visual
- Japanese: 魔法つかいプリキュア！！～MIRAI DAYS～
- Revised Hepburn: Mahōtsukai Purikyua!! Mirai Daisu
- Genre: Magical girl
- Creator: Izumi Todo
- Director: Takayuki Hamana
- Screenplay: Isao Murayama
- Character designers: Emiko Miyamoto (original); Asami Sodeyama
- Music: Hiroshi Takaki
- Country of origin: Japan
- Original language: Japanese
- No. of episodes: 12

Production
- Sound director: Miho Sugawara
- Art director: Kyōko Ishida
- Cinematographer: Akira Shimozaki
- Color designer: Yui Azumi
- CG director: Hiroshi Uchibori
- Editor: Keiko Onodera
- Animation producers: Takaharu Kado; Yoshifumi Nakata
- Studios: Toei Animation; Studio Deen
- Producers: Akira Tanaka; Daiki Tomihara; Haruhisa Oya; Keisuke Naitō; Takumi Kohama
- Production companies: Maho Girls Precure!! Mirai Days Production Committee

Original release
- Networks: ANN (ABC TV, TV Asahi)
- Release: January 11 – March 30, 2025

Related
- Preceded by
- Witchy Pretty Cure! (2016–2017)

Witchy Pretty Cure!! Mirai Days, (Note: Japanese: 魔法つかいプリキュア！！～MIRAI DAYS～, Hepburn: Mahōtsukai Purikyua!! Mirai Daisu; lit. "Magician Pretty Cure!! Future Days") also known as Maho Girls PreCure!! Mirai Days, is a 2025 Japanese anime television series based on the Pretty Cure franchise created by Izumi Todo, and it is a sequel to the franchise's thirteenth series, Witchy Pretty Cure!, which originally aired between 2016 and 2017. The series is directed by Takayuki Hamana at both Toei Animation and Studio Deen, written by Isao Murayama, character designed by Asami Sodeyama from original character concept by Emiko Miyamoto and music composed by Hiroshi Takaki. It aired on ANN's Animazing!!! programming block between January 11 and March 30, 2025.

== Story ==
Years after the defeat of Deusmaust of the Never Ending Chaos, Mirai, Liko, Ha-chan and Mofurun have reunited. The three are currently achieving their dreams from respective worlds, with Mirai as a university student with Mofurun at her side, Liko as a teacher in the magical world, and Ha-chan watches the world from afar. However, a new disaster appears and threatens both worlds, and Mirai and Liko reunite and transform into Pretty Cures again to fend off the mysterious new enemy.

== Production ==
In March 2023, it was announced that Witchy Pretty Cure! will receive a sequel, and will consist of 12 episodes on ANN's Animazing!!! programming block. In May 2024, the title of the sequel series was revealed, along with its release date. In June of the same month, it was announced that the main cast members: Rie Takahashi, Yui Horie, Saori Hayami and Ayaka Saitō will return to voice their respective characters. In August 2024, it was announced that Takayuki Hamana, whom previously directed Power of Hope: PreCure Full Bloom (2023), will direct the series at both Toei Animation and Studio Deen, and character designed by Asami Sodeyama from original character concept by Emiko Miyamoto, while Isao Murayama and Hiroshi Takaki will return to oversee the series' scripts and compose the music from the first series respectively. In November 2024, it was announced that Saori Hayami will also voice a new character named Hisui, and Toshiyuki Toyonaga was cast as new character named Ire the following month. The opening theme song is "Dokkin Witchy Pretty Cure!! Part 3: Mirai Days" (Dokkin - 魔法つかいプリキュア！！Part３～MIRAI DAYS～, Dokkin - Mahōtsukai Purikyua!! Pāto Surī Mirai Daisu), sung by Rie Kitagawa, while the ending theme song is "Miraculous Link" (キセキラリンク, Kisekirarinku) by three respective voice actresses. Crunchyroll streamed the series in North America, Latin America, Australia, New Zealand and South Africa.

== Episodes ==
- All episodes are written by Isao Murayama

No.	Title	Direction	Storyboard	Animation direction	Original release date
1	"A Miraculous and Magical Reunion!"; Transliteration: "Sakai wa Mirakuru de Majikaru!" (Japanese: 再会はミラクルでマジカル！)	Shigeru Yamazaki; Yū Yoshiyama	Takayuki Hamana; Yū Yoshiyama	Yū Yoshiyama, Risa Sugimoto, Yun Zhang, Seika Matsui, Getsurei, Rad Plus, RA CRAFT, Revival; Asami Sodeyama (Chief), Maki Fujii (Chief), Kiyoko Kametani (Chief), Naoko Iwata (Chief)	January 11, 2025
2	"Back to the Magical World!"; Transliteration: "Hisashiburi no Mahō-kai" (Japanese: 久しぶりの魔法界)	Chōroku Ikegami; Matsuo Asami; Yū Yoshiyama	Hiroyuki Fukushima; Yū Yoshiyama	Seika Matsui, Li Wang, Risa Sugimoto, Hayato Arata, Studio PAPER CRANES, Rad Plus, Triple A, Revival, Studio Gram, One Order, RA CRAFT, Reboot, PAPALELO, Naomi Utsuno; Maki Fujii (Chief), Guonian Wang (Chief), Rika Inoue (Chief), Kiyoko Kametani (Chief), Naoko Iwata (Chief), Asami Sodeyama (Chief)	January 18, 2025
3	"The Magic of Time"; Transliteration: "Koku no Mahō" (Japanese: 刻の魔法)	Ryoji Fujiwara; Yū Yoshiyama	Dae-Yeong Andong; Yū Yoshiyama	Tokuyuki Matsutake, Yukari Furiuke, Sui Kyoyo, Yumiko Haneda, Studio Gram, Bakudō Eiga, Getsurei, STUDIO MASSKET, RA CRAFT, Seven Seas, Hiromi Kurosawa, Risa Sugimoto, Angelo Yoshioka, Nakamura Production; Asami Sodeyama (Chief), Kiyoko Kametani (Chief), Marina Sato (Chief)	January 25, 2018
4	"Hisui's Secret"; Transliteration: "Hisui no Himitsu" (Japanese: ひすいの秘密)	Ryoji Fujiwara; Yū Yoshiyama	Takeshi Iida; Yū Yoshiyama	Mitsuki Kobayashi, Yū Yoshiyama, Production, Nami Fujitani, Yukari Furiuke, Kiyoko Kametani, Bakudō Eiga, Rad Plus, Triple A, reboot, One Order; Maki Fujii (Chief), Guonian Wang (Chief), Asami Sodeyama (Chief), Naoko Iwata (Chief)	February 1, 2025
5	"The Passing Years"; Transliteration: "Nagare Yuki Saigetsu" (Japanese: 流れ行く歳月)	Shigeru Yamazaki	Hiroyuki Fukushima	Risa Sugimoto, Yun Zhang; Kyoko Kametani (Chief), Seika Matsui (Chief)	February 9, 2025
6	"True Objective"; Transliteration: "Shin no Mokuteki" (Japanese: 真の目的)	Matsuo Asami; Yū Yoshiyama	Takayuki Hamana; Yū Yoshiyama	Yūji Takagi, Yū Yoshiyama, Yu Lin Zhou, Yi Ting Chen, Zi Wei Su; Maki Fujii (Chief)	February 16, 2025
7	"The Guardian of Time"; Transliteration: "Toki wo Tsukasadoru Mono" (Japanese: 刻をつかさどるもの)	Ken Takahashi; Yū Yoshiyama	Hiroyuki Fukushima; Yū Yoshiyama	Ken Takahashi, Naomi Utsuno, Risa Sugimoto, Yukari Koike, Yumiko Haneda, Yun Zhang, Ye Ung Heo, PAPALELO; Kyoko Kametani (Chief), Guonian Wang (Chief), Akiharu Ishii (Chief)	February 23, 2025
8	"Kotoha and Hisui"; Transliteration: "Kotoha to Hisui" (Japanese: ことはとひすい)	Matsuo Asami; Shigeru Yamazaki; Yū Yoshiyama	Hiroyuki Fukushima; Yū Yoshiyama	Daichi Nakajima, Hayato Arata, Nami Fujitani, Risa Sugimoto, Ryōken Seto, Takeshi Kusaka, Yuntao Hu, Shuoyuan Zhang, Lu Zen Cao, Xing Yu Zhao; Asami Sodeyama (Chief), Maki Fujii (Chief)	March 2, 2025
9	"Various Worlds"; Transliteration: "Sorezore no Sekai" (Japanese: それぞれの世界)	Masahiko Suzuki; Yū Yoshiyama	Hiroyuki Fukushima; Yū Yoshiyama	Daichi Nakajima, Naomi Utsuno, Nami Fujitani, Shigenori Taniguchi, Toshoyuki Matsutake, Yukari Koike, Yun Zhang; Kyoko Kametani (Chief), Guonian Wang (Chief), Akiharu Ishii (Chief)	March 9, 2025
10	"Chasing Time"; Transliteration: "Toki wo Otte" (Japanese: 刻を追って)	Mitsuki Kobayashi; Yū Yoshiyama	Mitsuki Kobayashi; Yū Yoshiyama	Daichi Nakajima, Hayato Arata, Risa Sugimoto, Yū Yoshiyama; Takeshi Kusaka (Chief), Kyoko Kametani (Chief), Maki Fujii (Chief)	March 16, 2025
11	"Mirai's Decision"; Transliteration: "Mirai no Ketsudan" (Japanese: みらいの決断)	Taiei Andō; Yū Yoshiyama	Taiei Andō; Yū Yoshiyama	Hiromi Kurosawa, Naomi Utsuno, Risa Sugimoto; Yū Yoshiyama (Chief)	March 23, 2025
12	"The Proper Future"; Transliteration: "Susumubeki Mirai" (Japanese: 進むべき未来)	Takayuki Hamana; Yū Yoshiyama	Takayuki Hamana; Yū Yoshiyama	Naomi Utsuno, Shun Nakajima, Yū Yoshiyama, Mika Hironaka, Yukari Koike, Wei Niao, Jia Nan Yao, Yi Ting Chen; Asami Sodeyama (Chief), Kyoko Kametani (Chief), Akiharu Ishii (Chief)	March 30, 2025

== Notes ==
Preceded by Wonderful Pretty Cure!	Witchy Pretty Cure!! Mirai Days; 2025	Succeeded by You and Idol Pretty Cure
