= Witchy Pretty Cure! =

Japanese anime television series

- Cover for the eighth DVD volume of the series.
- Japanese: 魔法つかいプリキュア!
- Revised Hepburn: Mahōtsukai Puikyua!
- Genre: Magical girl
- Created by: Izumi Todo
- Directed by: Masato Mitsuka
- Series composition: Isao Murayama
- Character designer: Emiko Miyamoto
- Music by: Hiroshi Takaki
- Country of origin: Japan
- Original language: Japanese
- No. of episodes: 50
- Episodes

Production
- Art director: Ryūtarō Matsuda
- Cinematographer: Tomokazu Shiratori
- Color designer: Yoshiko Sakuma
- Editor: Yoshihiro Aso
- Producers: Hiroshi Noshita (ABC); Mikio Ugetsu (ABC-A); Risa Endo (ADK); Keisuke Naito (Toei Animation)
- Production companies: ABC; ABC Animation; Asatsu-DK; Toei Animation

Original release
- Networks: ANN (ABC, TV Asahi)
- Release: February 7, 2016 – January 29, 2017

Related
- Manga
- Written by: Izumi Todo
- Illustrated by: Futago Kamikita
- Published by: Kodansha
- Magazine: Nakayoshi
- Original run: March 2016 – February 2017
- Volumes: 2
- See also
- Witchy Pretty Cure! The Movie: Wonderous! Cure Mofurun! (film, 2016); Witchy Pretty Cure!! Mirai Days (sequel 2025)

Witchy Pretty Cure!, (Note: Japanese: 魔法つかいプリキュア!, Hepburn: Mahōtsukai Purikyua!; lit. 'Magician Pretty Cure!') also known as Maho Girls PreCure!, is a Japanese anime television series produced by Toei Animation and the thirteenth installment in the Pretty Cure series. The series, directed by Masato Mitsuka and written by Isao Murayama with character designs by Emiko Miyamoto, aired on ABC and other ANN television stations between February 2016 and January 2017, succeeding Go! Princess Pretty Cure in its timeslot, and was succeeded by Kirakira Pretty Cure a la Mode. The series' main topic is friendship, while its motifs are magic and jewelry. A sequel series, Witchy Pretty Cure!! Mirai Days aired on ABC TV's Animazing!!! programming block between January and March 2025.

== Story ==
When thirteen-year-old Mirai Asahina goes with her teddy bear, Mofurun, to investigate a mysterious object that falls from the sky, she meets the young magician Liko, who is searching for the Linkle Stone Emerald. When servants of Dokurokushe arrive seeking the Emerald, Mirai and Liko gain the power to transform into the legendary magicians Pretty Cure through Mofurun, who comes to life. Afterwards, Mirai enrolls in the Magic School, where they learn how to use magic while fighting the minions of Dokurokushe and Never Ending Chaos.

== Characters ==
=== Pretty Cures ===
The Witchy Pretty Cures are legendary magicians who fought against evil and possessed powerful magic, using items called "Linkle Stones" (リンクルストーン, Rinkuru Sutōn). In the modern day, Mirai and Liko inherit these powers and search for the Linkle Stone Emerald. Magicians in the Magic World can cast spells with their wands by saying the phrase "Cure Up RaPaPa!" (キュアップ・ラパパ！, Kyuappu RaPaPa!). Through the power of the Linkle Stones, Mirai and Liko transform into Pretty Cures by holding hands with Mofurun and saying the phrase "Miracle Magical Jewelry" (ミラクル・マジカル・ジュエリーレ, Mirakuru Majikaru Juerīre), and perform purifying attacks with the Linkle Stick (リンクルステッキ, Rinkuru Sutekki). Using the Linkle Stones, they can transform into the Diamond, Ruby, Sapphire, and Topaz Styles, each with elemental powers: fire for Ruby, water for Sapphire, and electricity for Topaz. Cure Felice uses the Linkle Smartbook (リンクルスマホン, Rinkuru Sumahon) and the Linkle Stone Emerald to transform by saying the phrase "Felice Fun Fun Flowerle" (フェリーチェ・ファンファン・フラワーレ, Ferīche Fan Fan Furawāre) and attacks with the Flower Echo Wand (フラワーエコーワンド, Furawā Ekō Wando). Later, they receive the Rainbow Carriage (レインボーキャリッジ, Reinbō Kyarijji), which allows them to use more powerful attacks with the Alexandrite Style.

Mirai Asahina (朝日奈 みらい, Asahina Mirai) / Cure Miracle (キュアミラクル, Kyua Mirakuru)
Voiced by: Rie Takahashi
A 13/14-year-old girl and middle-school student living in the town of Tsunagi (津成木), where her family runs an accessories and jewelry shop, in the human world, which the inhabitants of the Magic World refer to as the No Magic Realm (ナシマホウ界, Nashimahō Kai). She is energetic and interested in many things, especially magicians and witches. Although she has friends, she often found companionship in Mofurun until meeting Liko. After she and Liko become Pretty Cures, she begins attending the Magic School and discovers her skill and talent for magic. Following Deusmast's death, she enrolls in college and is currently 20 years old at that time. As Cure Miracle, she is the Pretty Cure of Miracles and introduces herself as "The miracle of the duo! Cure Miracle!" (ふたりの奇跡!キュアミラクル!, Futari no Kiseki! Kyua Mirakuru!). Her theme color is pink, and her style's colors are red, blue, and yellow.

Liko Izayoi (十六夜 リコ, Izayoi Riko) / Cure Magical (キュアマジカル, Kyua Majikaru)
Voiced by: Yui Horie
A 13/14-year-old girl from the Magic World and Liz's younger sister, who attends the Magic School (魔法学校, Mahō Gakkō). Although she is good at studying and often believes her calculations to be correct, she often has trouble casting magic and riding her broom. After the Dark Magicians target the Magic World, she came to the No Magic World in search of the Linkle Stone Emerald, leading her to meet Mirai. Liz gave her the Linkle Stone Diamond, and she seeks to surpass her and become a famous witch. After passing the test, she is allowed to leave the Magic World and follow Mirai to the No Magic World, where the other Linkle Stones are hidden. She later enrolls in Tsunagi First Middle School (津成木第一中学校, Tsunagi Daiichi Chūgakkō) with Mirai while in the No Magic World and begins living with her and her family. Following Deusmast's death, she returns to the Magic World and becomes a teacher under the age of 19, later reuniting with Mirai and Kotoha. She is the Pretty Cure of Magic and introduces herself as "The magic of the duo! Cure Magical!" (ふたりの魔法!キュアマジカル!, Futari no Mahō! Kyua Majikaru!). Her theme color is purple, and her style's colors are red, blue, and yellow.

Ha-chan (はーちゃん, Hā-chan) / Kotoha Hanami (花海 ことは, Hanami Kotoha) / Cure Felice (キュアフェリーチェ, Kyua Ferīche)
Voiced by: Saori Hayami
A mysterious fairy who resides in the Linkle Smartbook and grows up and begins to speak as the series progresses. By eating food created from using the Linkle Stones with the Linkle Smartbook, she can transform into various forms. During their first encounter, Sparda suspects that she may be related to the Linkle Stones, specifically the Linkle Stone Emerald. She disappears along with Kushe after the Cures defeat him, but reappears as a 14-year-old girl named Kotoha Hanami and rescues them as Cure Felice. However, they are unaware of her identity as Ha-chan until after they reunite with each other and she begins living at Mirai's house alongside Liko. Later on, Orba reveals that she is the reincarnation of Mother Rapapa and inherited her powers. After the final battle against Deusmast, she separates the No Magic World and the Magic World and watches over them, later reuniting with Mirai and Liko. As Cure Felice, she is the Pretty Cure of Life and introduces herself as "A blessing upon all forms of life! Cure Felice!" (あまねく生命に祝福を!キュアフェリーチェ!, Amaneku Inochi ni Shukufuku o! Kyua Ferīche!). Her theme color is green.

Mofurun (モフルン, Mofurun) / Cure Mofurun (キュアモフルン, Kyua Mofurun)
Voiced by: Ayaka Saitō
An agender teddy bear given to Mirai by her grandmother when she was a baby, whom she treats as a dear friend. After Mirai and Liko's first transformation into Pretty Cures, Mofurun comes to life and serves as their transformation device. She can detect the presence of other Linkle Stones as a sweet scent and often ends her sentences with "mofu". In the film, Mofurun becomes Cure Mofurun through the powers of the Linkle Stone Mofurun and, later, the Linkle Stone Heartful, also having the ability to transform into different styles through the Linkle Stones. Mofurun can also summon the Rainbow Carriage at will and unlock the Heartful Styles to use the attack Heartful Rainbow. As Cure Mofurun, she is the Pretty Cure of Wishes and introduces herself as "Fluffy Mofurun! Cure Mofurun!" (モフモフモフルン!キュアモフルン!, Mofumofu Mofurun! Kyua Mofurun!). Her theme color is yellow and her style's colors are red and blue.

=== Magic School ===
==== Teachers ====
Headmaster (校長, Kōchō)
Voiced by: Yūya Uchida
The principal of the Magic School, who is known as the greatest magician of the Magic World. After witnessing Mirai and Liko transform into Pretty Cure, he proposes that Mirai attend the Magic School to improve her skills. He met Kanoko when she was younger and saved her cat, and was good friends with Kushe until he turned to dark magic and became Dokurokushe. He uses magic to maintain a younger form and becomes older after fighting Dokurokushe in his lair, but is restored to normal along with Magic Crystal after Dokurokushe's demise.

Head Teacher (教頭, Kyōtō)
Voiced by: Yoshino Ohtori
The vice principal and head teacher of the Magic School.

Cathy (キャシー, Kyashī) / Magic Crystal (魔法の水晶, Mahō no Suishō)
Voiced by: Satomi Arai
A mysterious woman who communicates with the Headmaster through a crystal ball but is often misunderstood. She becomes older after she and the Headmaster fight Dokurokushe in his lair, but they are restored to normal after Dokurokushe's demise.

Issac (アイザック, Aizakku)
Voiced by: Toshiharu Sakurai
A forgetful teacher who teaches supplementary classes.

Liz (リズ, Rizu)
Voiced by: Kaori Nazuka
Liko's older sister and a teacher trainee at the Magic School, who once possessed the Linkle Stone Diamond before giving it to Liko. She is skilled at both studies and magic and is often called upon to teach lessons.

Loretta (ロレッタ, Roretta)
Voiced by: Ayako Kawasumi
A teacher in the mermaid's village.

==== Students ====
Jun (ジュン)
Voiced by: Aki Kanada
A student who is tomboyish and often skips classes, causing her to have a poor attendance record.

Kay (ケイ, Kei)
Voiced by: Maya Yoshioka
A student who is prone to being tardy and losing her belongings.

Emily (エミリー, Emirī)
Voiced by: Chinami Hashimoto
A student who is easily frightened and is often in supplementary classes.

Dorothy (ドロシー, Doroshī), Nancy (ナンシー, Nanshī) & Cissy (シシー, Shishī)
Voiced by: Keiko Kobayashi, Miharu Sawada & Naomi Ōzora
Residents of the mermaid's village. Following Deusmast's death, they enroll in the Magic School.

=== Antagonists ===
==== Dark Magicians ====
The Dark Magicians (闇の魔法つかい, Yami no Mahō Tsukai) are the main antagonists of the first half of the series, who aim to acquire the Linkle Stone Emerald and allow their leader Dokurokushe to conquer the Magic World and the No Magic World with dark magic, also seeking the Linkle Smartbook after discovering Ha-chan's power. Dokurokushe's subordinates were originally animals who were infused with magic and assumed a humanoid form to act in his stead due to his physical condition.

==== Leaders ====
Dokurokushe (ドクロクシー, Dokurokushī) / Kushe (クシィ, Kushī)
Voiced by: Yōsuke Akimoto (Dokurokushe), Yuichi Nakamura (Kushe)
The main antagonist in the first half of the series and the leader of the Dark Magicians. He is a power-hungry magician who possesses great magical prowess, but, due to his ailing physical condition, has his subordinates act for him, with Yamoh interpreting him to give them orders. He is later revealed to have been Kushe, a magician and close friend of the Headmaster whose obsession with studying magic to prevent a great calamity caused him to turn to dark magic. This reduced his body to a skeleton, but his desire to obtain the Linkle Stone Emerald and conquer the world caused him to return. Despite this, he still values his friendship with the Headmaster, as he kept a photo of them in the book of dark magic that he wrote. After obtaining the Linkle Stone Emerald and the Smartbook, he absorbs their power and Yamoh's power and transforms into a more powerful form to fight the Cures. Ha-chan purifies and cleanses him of his grudge and his spirit leaves his body as it breaks apart, with Yamoh using his remains to create more powerful Yokubaru. His spirit later returns to the effigy Yamoh made of him, aiding his subordinates in battle once more before disappearing.

Yamoh (ヤモー, Yamō)
Voiced by: Yasuhiro Takato
A humanoid gecko and Dokurokushe's second-in-command. He is clairvoyant and can see the future through his cauldron, and is responsible for leading his subordinates in his stead, interpreting his body movements to give them orders. He is absorbed by Dokurokushe during his final fight with the Cures, but Labut uses the remains of his discarded tail to revive him. Appalled by Dokurokushe's demise, he uses his bones to create stronger Yokubaru and seeks revenge, creating an effigy of Dokurokushe to report on his progress. He uses Dokurokushe's last bone to transform himself into a Yokubaru to capture Kotoha and the Linkle Stone Emerald, but is defeated and returned to his original form as a gecko. Batty later fuses him and his group into a Yokubaru to fight Orba's Don Yokubaru, but after being defeated, he leaves with Batty. He is seemingly restored back to his humanoid form by his love for his master after witnessing his return. After Dokurokushe's last remaining bone, a tooth that Yamoh pulled out after it developed a cavity, is revived by the spirit within it as a being that loves sweets, Chikurun supports Yamoh by providing him with honey to make it happy.

==== Subordinates ====
Batty (バッティ, Batti)
Voiced by: Kōji Yusa
A humanoid bat dressed in formal attire, with a long cape that allows him to fly. After Dokurokushe empowers him, he becomes loyal to him and is depressed at being unable to protect him, calling himself a failure. He observes Sparda and Gamets' final fights and brings them to Dokurokushe's lair after they return to their animal forms; they later lend him their wands to transform him into a monster, and after his defeat he retains his humanoid form. However, when he attempts to obtain the Linkle Stone Emerald, it extracts his magic and returns him to his original state. Sparda then finds him and Orba restores him to his human form, but he no longer wants to fight. When Orba mocks dark magic, he regains his motivation and defeats his Don Yokubaru with a Yokubaru created from his friends, then leaves with them. Following Deusmast's death, he enrolls at the Magic School.

Sparda (スパルダ, Suparuda)
Voiced by: Yū Kobayashi
A humanoid spider who is cunning and can use webs to grab objects and fight. She loves dark magic and is the most invested in Dokurokushe's idea of a world ruled by it. She often experiments with magic, including on living beings, and is the first to fuse with a Yokubaru. After the Cures defeat her, she returns to her original form as a spider and Batty takes her with him. Later in the series, Orba returns her to her humanoid form to learn more about dark magic. She appears to act as his loyal servant, but this is revealed to be a ruse to resurrect her teammates and steal Dokurokushe's book from him. Orba then transforms her back into a normal spider, but she becomes part of a Yokubaru fusion that defeats Orba's Don Yokubaru. She then leaves with Batty and the others.

Gamets (ガメッツ, Gamettsu)
Voiced by: Jouji Nakata
A humanoid turtle who seeks fights to test his strength. He steals the Linkle Stone Garnet and uses magic to make himself tall and agile, bursting his shell in the process. In this form, he challenges the Cures to fight him on a remote island, and following his defeat he is satisfied as he reverts to his original state. After being revived by Orba, Sparda convinces Gamets to fight the Cures by telling him that he can fight Felice. He is angry at Orba and along with Sparda, fights him when he interrupts his "sacred battle" with Felice. He is turned back into a regular turtle and becomes part of the Yokubaru fusion that defeats Orba's Don Yokubaru. After this, he leaves with Batty and the others.

=== Never Ending Chaos ===
The Never Ending Chaos (終わりなき混沌, Owarinaki Konton) are the main antagonists of the second half of the series, who aim to unleash chaos upon the world and revive their master Deusmast, which Mother Rapapa sealed within the sun.

Deusmast (デウスマスト, Deusumasuto)
The main antagonist of the second half of the series, an evil deity of chaos who consumes worlds. His foretold return played a role in Kushe's transformation into Dokurokushe, as he sought to prevent this calamity from occurring. Deusmast was born from the fusion of four beings known as Never Ending Chaos, who possess the power of Mugic (ムホー, Muhō). Though Mother Rapapa sealed Deusmast in the sun, the Dark Magicians' actions allowed Deusmast to create constructs in the form of the members of Never Ending Chaos, who prepare Earth for his return. Though three of the Endless Chaos members are sent back to the sun, the seal is broken and a revived Deusmast fuses the No Magic World and Magic World before being killed when the Cures destroy him and his components with Extreme Rainbow, after which the worlds are separated. Deusmast speaks in the voices of the members of Never Ending Chaos, who form the orb-like eyes around his body.

Labut (ラブー, Rabū)
Voiced by: Naoki Tatsuta
A genie who considers himself to be superior to magicians because of his innate level of magic and ability to bend reality. Labut emerges from his lamp following Dokurokushe's demise and revives Yamoh to work for him before using Don Yokubaru after he fails him. Labut later confronts the Cures directly by sending them to another dimension and separating them, where he shows his true form. After Mirai saves her teammates, they kill him with Extreme Rainbow and send his essence into the sun. Though he is later revived as part of Deusmast, he is killed again when the Cures kill Deusmast.

Shakince (シャーキンス, Shākinsu)
Voiced by: Shō Hayami
A tengu-like man who orders Chikurun to steal the Linkle Stones for him and then consumes them to become more powerful, but Chikurun retrieves them again. After he injures Chikurun, the Cures' feelings for Chikurun allow them to overpower and kill him with Extreme Rainbow. Though he is later revived as part of Deusmast, he is killed again when the Cures kill Deusmast.

Benigyo (ベニーギョ, Benīgyo)
Voiced by: Kikuko Inoue
A Raijin-like woman who has the powers of lightning and teleportation. After her comrades are defeated by the Cures, she uses their powers to assume a demonic form and fights them. She is nearly killed until she becomes part of Deusmast, making her the only member to not be defeated by the Cures until she is fused. Benigyo is killed again when the Cures kill Deusmast.

Orba (オルーバ, Orūba)
Voiced by: Noriaki Sugiyama
A fallen angel who studies his enemies before attacking them. He steals Dokurokushe's book and uses it to revive the Dark Magicians so he can study dark magic, also manipulating Chikurun into working for him. He confronts the Cures, but is betrayed by Sparda, who tries to steal the book after he mocks dark magic and her old master. He assumes his demonic form to turn Sparda and Gamets back into their animal forms and punish them for their betrayal. The Cures kill him with Extreme Rainbow, but he manages to revive his comrades around the world with Dokurokushe's book before he dies. Though he is later revived as part of Deusmast, he is killed again when the Cures kill Deusmast.

==== Monsters ====
Yokubaru (ヨクバール, Yokubāru)
Voiced by: Takahiro Shimada (Yokubaru/Super Yokubaru), Shota Yamamoto (Don Yokubaru)
The monsters of the series, which the Dark Magicians create using dark magic to fuse two objects together through a wand with a skull head. A stronger variant of Yokubaru, Super Yokubaru (スーパーヨクバール, Sūpā Yokubāru), has a red skull and is created using Dokurokushe's bones. Another version of the Yokubaru is called Don Yokubaru (ドンヨクバール, Don'yokubāru), and is created by the generals of Never Ending Chaos. The version of Yokubaru created by the Dark Magicians has a black skull and is more powerful than the usual Yokubaru. "Yokubaru" is derived from Japanese yokubaru (欲張る) meaning "to covet", while "Don Yokubaru" is a portmanteau of Japanese don'yoku (貪欲) meaning "greed" and yokubaru (欲張る).

==== Others ====
Chikurun (チクルン, Chikurun)
Voiced by: NEEKO
A bee-like fairy from Fairy Village who works for Orba and spies on the Cures to get information about them, taking an interest in Mofurun. When Chikurun steals the Linkle Stones, they are exposed as a spy, but forgiven after retrieving the Linkle Stones from Shakince. Later on, they provide Yamoh with honey to make Dokuromushe, the spirit of Dokurokushe's sweet tooth, happy.

==== Mirai Days villains ====
Chronosto (クロノウスト, Kuronousuto)
Voiced by: Shin-ichiro Miki, Aki Shimada (puppy)
The main antagonist of Mirai Days. He is an ancient monster who disguises himself as a puppy who accompanies Ire. He is revealed to be a spawn of Deusmast who empowers itself by feeding on the time of those who reject the future. His objective is to consume the time of every living being, turning everyone in stone and forcing them to relive their happiest memories forever before being permanently killed by the Precure after the girls regain their memories.

Ire (アイル, Airu)
Voiced by: Toshiyuki Toyonaga
The secondary antagonist of Mirai Days. A mysterious man who carries one of Deusmast's "spawns", giving him magic abilities over time and memories. He is later revealed to be the servant of Chronostro. Born in the Magic World, his mother raised him in the No Magic World before dying, leaving him orphaned at a young age, he seeks to use Kotoha's power to completely revive Chronosto and return to the past, when she was alive. However, he is turned to stone after releasing Chronosto.

Monsters (モンスター, Monsutā)
Voiced by: Shōta Yamamoto
The beings summoned by Ire and Chronostro to attack the Pretty Cure. The ones used by Ire are made out by the memories from his past, while Chronosto's monsters seem to be made out of the visions of the future of his victims.

=== Other characters ===
Kyoko Asahina (朝日奈今日子, Asahina Kyōko)
Voiced by: Yuko Kato
Mirai's mother, Daikichi's wife, and Kanoko's daughter, whose original name was Kyoko Yuki (結希 今日子, Yuki Kyōko). She is the owner of the Power Stone shop.

Daikichi Asahina (朝日奈大吉, Asahina Daikichi)
Voiced by: Tsuyoshi Aoki
Mirai's father and Kyoko's husband, who is a maker of consumer electronics.

Kanoko Yuki (結希かの子, Yūki Kanoko)
Voiced by: Kotoe Taichi
Mirai's grandmother and Kyoko's mother, who gave her Mofurun when she was a baby. She is caring and believes Mirai's stories about magicians, as she met the Headmaster when she was younger and he saved her cat.

François (フランソワ, Furansowa)
Voiced by: Yoshinori Fujita (eps 3-28), Makoto Ishii (ep 38 onwards)
A wizard who sells uniforms.

Gustav (グスタフ, Gusutafu)
Voiced by: Masafumi Kimura
A wizard who sells Magic Brooms.

Todd (トッド, Toddo)
Voiced by: Yuto Suzuki
A wizard who sells fruits and vegetables.

Hook (フック, Fukku)
Voiced by: Mitsuo Senda
An elderly wizard who likes to spread rumors.

Kana Katsuki (勝木かな, Katsuki Kana), Mayumi Nagase (長瀬まゆみ, Nagase Mayumi), Souta Ono (大野壮太, Ōno Sōta) & Yuto Namiki (並木ゆうと, Namiki Yūto)
Voiced by: Mika Kikuchi (Kana), Konomi Tada (Mayumi), Koji Takahashi (Souta) & Ayaka Asai (Yuto)
Mirai and Liko's friends and classmates.

Takagi (高木)
Voiced by: Kento Fujinuma
Mirai and Liko's homeroom teacher.

Lien (リアン, Rian)
Voiced by: Masato Obara
An archaeologist in the Magic World and Liko and Liz's father.

Lilia (リリア, Riria)
Voiced by: Junko Iwao
A cooking expert in the Magic World and Liko and Liz's mother.

Queen (女王, Joō)
Voiced by: Yuriko Yamamoto
The current queen of the Fairy Village.

Legend Queen (レジェンド女王, Rejendo Joō)
Voiced by: Yoshiko Ōta
The former queen of the Fairy Village.

Mother Rapapa (マザー・ラパーパ, Mazā Rapāpa)
The protector of Earth, who sealed away Deusmast and his minions before losing her powers, creating the Magic World and the No Magic World. Kotoha is her reincarnation and inherited her powers.

Ichika Usami (宇佐美 いちか, Usami Ichika) / Cure Whip (キュアホイップ, Kyua Hoippu)
Voiced by: Karen Miyama
A pink-colored Pretty Cure from Kirakira Pretty Cure a la Mode.

Hisui (ひすい)
Voiced by: Saori Hayami
A mysterious girl who appears in Mirai Days, who Mirai and Liko meet and take in. Kotoha created her and gave her some of her power, sending her to Mirai and Liko in order to stop Ire. She disappears after Kotoha returns.

Mayumi Nagase (長瀬まゆみ, Nagase Mayumi)
Voiced by: Keiko Kobayashi
Mirai's classmate at her university in Mirai Days.

Rena Tanizaki (谷崎れな, Tanizaki Rena)
Voiced by: Miharu Sawada
Mirai's classmate at her university in Mirai Days.

Erina (エリナ)
Voiced by: Ayako Kawasumi
Ire's late mother. A witch from the Magical World, who raised her son, Ire, in the No Magic World. She promised to teach him magic, but died years prior to the events of the original series and Mirai Days. Ire's goal is to travel back in time to before her death to be with her again.

=== Movie characters ===
Kumata (クマタ) / Dark Matter (ダークマター, Dāku Matā)
Voiced by: Daisuke Namikawa
The main antagonist of the film. He is a black bear with the ability to use magic and wishes to help people, but harbors hatred towards humans because they fear him, leading him to be brainwashed and take on the appearance of an adult bear wearing a mask. He takes the form of a young bear to manipulate Mofurun and captures her to help him make his wish come true, but she escapes. He attacks the Cures, but Mofurun allows herself to be defeated to make him snap out of it. After Dark Matter emerges from his body, he helps the Cures battle it. At the end of the movie, he loses his magic and becomes friends with the bears of the forest.
Shadows (カゲ, Kage)
Dark Matter's minions, whom he summons when he attacks the Grand Magic Festival and when Mofurun escapes from his lair. Some of them possess the Flare Dragon, transforming it into the Shadow Dragon. After Kumata loses his magic power, it turns into a giant version of the shadows.
Flare Dragon (フレアドラゴン, Furea Doragon) / Shadow Dragon (カゲドラゴン, Kage Doragon)
Voiced by: Shota Yamamoto
A flare dragon who performs tricks in the Grand Magic Festival's Circus Balloon and which Kotoha is able to communicate with,. When Dark Matter disrupts the festival and abducts the Wishing Stone and Mofurun, he turns the Flare Dragon into a Shadow Dragon and flies away on it. Later, when the Cures are searching for Mofurun, Felice distracts the Shadow Dragon when it attacks them so the others can head to Dark Matter's lair. When Mofurun is fighting Dark Matter while Mirai frees Liko, Felice returns with the Flare Dragon and explains that it was possessed by Dark Matter's shadows and that used the Pink Tourmaline to rid it of the shadows. After that, the Flare Dragon helps the Cures fly out of Dark Matter's lair, later helping them break into the giant shadow to battle Pure Shadow Matter.
Bears (森のくま, Mori no Kuma)
Inhabitants of the forest, who Mofurun meets and befriends when she escapes from Dark Matter's lair and whom fear Kumata's power. When everyone is wishing for Mofurun to come back alive and shouting "Cure Up・RaPaPa!", the bears join in with "Kumappu・KuMaMa!". At the end of the movie, Kumata is accepted as one of them.

== Development and production ==
The series was first revealed via a trademark filing posted on October 19, 2015, and was publicly announced on November 26, 2015.

Producer Mikio Uezuki stated that "While following the universal themes of love, justice, dreams, and friendship that the Pretty Cure series has so far, we want to make a work that boldly draws its worldview and motifs that go beyond the framework of the series. It is by no means a panacea, and what is important is the contact of the 'heart' between people." Keisuke Naito, producer of Toei Animation also stated, "By joining hands with each other, we connect hearts, hope, and the world I would like to convey it through the world."

Yuta Tanaka stated while promoting the film that Mofurun is a gender-neutral character, with the film's staff designing its Cure form to match its appearance. Several staff for the anime, including Emiko Miyamoto, Ken Ueno, Yu Kaminoki, Keisuke Naito, and series director Mitsuka Masato confirmed Mofurun's gender, while Toei and Bandai referred to Mofurun's gender as "Mofurun". Isao Murayama also stated in a separate interview that Mofurun was meant to be a girl, but this was not included due to time constraints.

== Media ==
=== Anime ===
The original series aired on ABC, TV Asahi and their affiliates between February 7, 2016, and January 29, 2017. The series was pitched to licensors at AnimeJapan 2016 under the English name Witchy Pretty Cure. Crunchyroll streamed the series with original Japanese audio and English subtitles in 2024.

=== Sequel ===
A sequel anime television series, Witchy Pretty Cure!! Mirai Days (Japanese: 魔法つかいプリキュア！！～Mirai Days～, Hepburn: Mahōtsukai Purikyua! ～Mirai Days～) (Note: Mirai is Japanese for Future, and also a reference to the series' lead protagonist Mirai Asahina.) aired on ABC TV's Animazing!!! programming block from January 12 to March 30, 2025. Co-produced by Toei Animation and Studio Deen, the series was directed by Takayuki Hamana with series composition and screenplays by Isao Murayama. Crunchyroll also streamed the series.

==== Films ====
The main characters appeared in the movie Pretty Cure All Stars: Singing with Everyone♪ Miraculous Magic!, released on March 19, 2016. A film based on the series, titled Witchy Pretty Cure! The Movie: Wonderous! Cure Mofurun! (映画 魔法つかいプリキュア！ 奇跡の変身！キュアモフルン！, Eiga Mahōtsukai Purikyua!: Kiseki no Henshin! Kyua Mofurun!), including a fully CG animated short titled Cure Miracle and Mofurun's Magic Lesson! (キュアミラクルとモフルンの魔法レッスン！, Kyua Mirakuru to Mofurun no Mahō Ressun!) was released on October 29, 2016.

Pretty Cure Dream Stars! (映画プリキュアドリームスターズ！, Eiga Purikyua Dorīmu Sutāzu!), was released on March 18, 2017.

KiraKira☆PreCure à la Mode: Crisply! The Memory of Mille-feuille! (映画 キラキラ☆プリキュアアラモード パリッと！想い出のミルフィーユ！, Eiga Kirakira ☆ Purikyua Ara Mōdo: Paritto! Omoide no Mirufīyu!), including a fully CG animated short titled Petit☆Dream Stars! Let's・la・Cookin'? Showtime! (Petit☆ドリームスターズ！レッツ・ラ・クッキン？ショータイム！, Puchi ☆ Dorīmu Sutāzu! Rettsu Ra Kukkin? Shōtaimu!) was released on October 28, 2017.

Pretty Cure Super Stars! (映画 プリキュアスーパースターズ！, Eiga Purikyua Sūpā Sutāzu!), was released on March 17, 2018.

Wonderful Pretty Cure the Movie: A Thrilling Adventure In The Game World! (わんだふるぷりきゅあ！ざ・むーびー！ドキドキ♡ゲームの世界で大冒険, Wandafuru Purikyua! Za・Mūbī! Dokidoki ♡ Gēmu no Sekai de Daibōken!), was released in Japanese movie theaters on September 13, 2024.

==== Music ====
In the first 21 episodes, the opening theme is "Dokkin♢Mahōtsukai PreCure!" (Dokkin♢魔法つかいプリキュア!, Exciting Maho Girls PreCure!) composed by Aiko Okumura and performed by Rie Kitagawa, who previously performed the ending themes for Go! Princess PreCure, while the ending theme is "Cure Up￪ Ra♡Pa☆Pa!~ Hohoemi ni Naru Mahō ~" (CURE UP↑RA♡PA☆PA!〜ほほえみになる魔法〜, Cure Up↑ Ra♡Pa☆Pa! ~Magic to Make You Smile~) composed by Akifumi Tada and performed by Rie Takahashi and Yui Horie.

From episode 22 onwards, the opening theme is "Dokkin♢Mahōtsukai PreCure! Part 2" (Dokkin♢魔法つかいプリキュア! Part 2, Exciting Maho Girls PreCure! Part 2) performed by Rie Kitagawa and the ending theme is called "Mahō Ara Dōmo!" (魔法アラ・ドーモ!, Magic Âla・Thanks) performed by Rie Takahashi, Yui Horie and Saori Hayami. The music is composed by Hiroshi Takaki, who previously composed the music for DokiDoki! PreCure, HappinessCharge PreCure!, and Go! Princess PreCure. The single was released on March 2, 2016, by Marvelous! featuring the theme songs from the first 21 episodes. The first official soundtrack of the series, titled PreCure♡Miracle☆Sound!! was released on May 25, 2016, along with the vocal album on July 13, 2016, with the title Linkle☆Melodies. The single for the second opening and ending theme was released on August 10, 2016. On November 23, 2016, the second official soundtrack of the series was released, titled PreCure☆Magical♡Sound!!.

=== Manga ===
A manga adaptation illustrated by Futago Kamikita began serialization in Kodansha's Nakayoshi magazine from February 3, 2016.

=== Merchandise ===
Bandai released various merchandise during the series including watches, bags, and transformation items.

Witchy PreCure! will also be branded as official Tokyo 2020 mascots as merchandise, along with other well known anime series like One Piece, Digimon, Dragon Ball, Naruto and Sailor Moon.

=== Others ===
In Puyo Puyo Quest, featuring the characters in the Strawberry Melonpan Festival event.

== Notes ==
Preceded by Go! Princess Pretty Cure	Witchy Pretty Cure! 2016–2017	Succeeded by Kirakira Pretty Cure a la Mode
