= Pretty Cure Super Stars! =

2018 film by Yoko Ikeda

- Kanji: 映画プリキュアスーパースターズ！
- Revised Hepburn: Eiga Purikuya Sūpa Sutāzu!
- Directed by: Yoko Ikeda
- Screenplay by: Shōji Yonemura
- Based on: Pretty Cure by Izumi Todo
- Starring: Rie Hikisaka; Rina Honnizumi; Yui Ogura; Konomi Tada; Junko Noda; Karen Miyama; Haruka Fukuhara; Tomo Muranaka; Saki Fujita; Nanako Mori; Inori Minase; Mika Kanai; Rie Takahashi; Yui Horie; Saori Hayami; Ayaka Saitō
- Cinematography: Shinichi Igarashi
- Edited by: Yoshihiro Aso
- Music by: Yuki Hayashi
- Production company: Toei Animation
- Distributed by: Toei Company, Ltd.
- Release date: March 17, 2018
- Running time: 70 minutes
- Country: Japan
- Language: Japanese

Pretty Cure Super Stars! (Japanese: 映画プリキュアスーパースターズ！, Hepburn: Eiga Purikyua Sūpa Sutāzu!) is a 2018 Japanese animated action fantasy film based on the Pretty Cure franchise created by Izumi Todo. The film is directed by Yoko Ikeda, written by Shōji Yonemura, and produced by Toei Animation. The film was released in Japan on March 17, 2018.

Marking the tenth entry to the Pretty Cure All Stars crossover film series, the Hug! Pretty Cure team joins forces with Witchy PreCure! and Kirakira Pretty Cure a la Mode teams to stop a rampaging monster named Usobakka.

== Plot ==
The Hug! Pretty Cure team: Hana, Saaya, and Homare encounters a mysterious rampaging monster named Usobakka while flower viewing. As they transform and fight, Usobakka turns their transformation devices into stones and reverts their transformations. As Usobakka kidnaps Saaya and Homare, Hana proposes to seek help from other Pretty Cures. Few hours later, Hana encounters the Kirakira Pretty Cure a la Mode team: Ichika, Himari, Aoi, Yukari, Akira and Ciel after they rescue Hugtan from a stroller. Usobakka appears again, and like from before, he turns their transformation devices into stones and kidnaps the Kirakira team but Ichika.

Ichika and Hana goes to the Magic World, where they try to alert the Witchy PreCure! team: Mirai, Riko and Ha-chan about Usobakka, but he appears once again and kidnaps Riko and Ha-chan. As the three girls escape, Hana reveals that the monster was known as a boy named Clover, as she had befriended him as a child and couldn't fulfill her promise to see him again. Meanwhile, the other trapped girls meet up with Saaya and Homare, whom realizes that they are slowly being turned into stones. Mirai proposes to Hana to find the Door of Time to prevent and save Clover from being turned into Usobakka. As they find and enter the door, Hana apologizes to Clover, and rescues him by exiting his world.

As Clover realizes that his partner, Dark Onibi had deceived him, Onibi reveals his true intentions and turns into a gigantic monster. To make up for his mistakes, Clover uses his powers to reunite the three Pretty Cure teams and restore their transformation items. The Cures transforms and fight Dark Onibi, but are bested, even with Kirakira and Witchy teams' powerful state. Clover then uses last of his powers to aid the Pretty Cures, and with the additional aid of the Miracle Lights, they attack Onibi with "Pretty Cure Clover Formation" attack. As Onibi is cured, Clover takes his flames with him to the afterlife, but not before making another promise with Yell.

== Voice cast ==
Hug! Pretty Cure cast

- Rie Hikisaka as Hana Nono/Cure Yell
- Rina Honnizumi as Saaya Yakushiji/Cure Ange
- Yui Ogura as Homare Kagayaki/Cure Etoile
- Konomi Tada as Hugtan
- Junko Noda as Hariham Harry
  - Jun Fukushima as Hariham's human form

Kirakira Pretty Cure a la Mode cast

- Karen Miyama as Ichika Usami/Cure Whip
- Haruka Fukuhara as Himari Arisugawa/Cure Custard
- Tomo Muranaka as Aoi Tategami/Cure Gelato
- Saki Fujita as Yukari Kotozume/Cure Macaron
- Nanako Mori as Akira Tenjō/Cure Chocolat
- Inori Minase as Kirarin/Ciel Kirahoshi/Cure Parfait
- Mika Kanai as Pekorin

Witchy PreCure! cast

- Rie Takahashi as Mirai Asahina/Cure Miracle
- Yui Horie as Riko Izayoi/Cure Magical
- Saori Hayami as Kotoha Hanami/Cure Felice
- Ayaka Saitō as Mofurun

Film characters

- Kensho Ono as Clover
- Kazuki Kitamura as Usobakka
  - Kitamura also voices Dark Onibi

== Production ==
The new Pretty Cure All Stars crossover film was announced in January 2018. Pretty Cure episode director Yoko Ikeda directed the film, with screenplay by Shōji Yonemura, whom was in charge of writing Smile PreCure! series, and character design and chief animation direction by Hisashi Kagawa, whom previously designed Fresh Pretty Cure! series. Kazuki Kitamura and Kensho Ono was announced to voice the original film characters; Usobakka and Clover respectively.

== Release ==
The film was released in theaters in Japan on March 17, 2018.

== Reception ==
=== Box office ===
The film opened at number 3 out of top 10 in the Japanese box office in its opening week, and consistently stayed on the charts the following weeks.
