= Karen Miyama =

Japanese actress

- 美山 加恋
- Born: December 12, 1996 (age 29); Higashimurayama, Tokyo, Japan
- Occupations: Actress; voice actress
- Years active: 2002–present
- Agent: Horipro

Karen Miyama (美山加恋, Miyama Karen; born December 12, 1996) is a Japanese actress and voice actress. She used to be part of the Gekidan Tohai talent agency, and is now part of Horipro talent agency. She portrayed the young Ann Uekusa in the live-action drama Sand Chronicles. In anime, she provided the voice of title character Momo Miyaura in the 2011 film A Letter to Momo, and she provides the voice of main character Ichika Usami a.k.a. Cure Whip in Kirakira PreCure a la Mode and the voice Maika Chōno in Aikatsu Friends!.

== Filmography ==
=== Drama ===
List of acting performances in television drama
Year	Title	Role	Notes	Source
2002	Shiawase no Shippo		Ep. 11	
2003	Yoiko no Mikata		Ep. 9	
2003	Ashitatenkinināre		Ep. 6	
2004	Boku to Kanojo to Kanojo no Ikiru Michi '	Koyanagi Rin		
2004	Big Money - Ukiyo no sata wa kabu shidai		Ep. 7	
2004–16	Gekai Hatomura Shugoro Yami no Chart			
2005	Za Kaigo Bancho			
2006	Junjo Kirari	Arimori Sakurako	Asadora	
2006	Chibi Maruko-chan	Tamae Honami		
2006	Gakincho	Natsukawa Momo		
2007	Sand Chronicles	Ann Uekusa (young girl)		
2007	Swan no Baka	Rie Suwano		
2008	Cat Street			
2009	Romes: kūkō bōgyo shisutemu			
2010	IRIS	Yuki		
2010	Guilty Akuma to Keiyakushita Onna	Matsunaga Misaki	Ep. 2-3	
2011	Stosugyo Homerun			
2011	Furusato ~Musume no Tabidachi~			
2011	Shinomachi Rocket	Rina Tsukuda		
2012	Suzuko no Koi		Ep. 1-2	
2012	Koko Nyushi	Asami Shibata		
2013	Discover Dead	Ryo	Ep. 2	
2013	Yamada-kun and the Seven Witches	Meiko Otsuka		
2013	Ko Kyōto renzoku satsujin jiken × gekaihatomurashūgorō		cross-over episode	
2013	Bandits vs. Samurai Squadron	Oshino	Ep. 3; live-action drama based on 1978 film	
2014	Suiyo Mystery 9: Zaika	町村花歩		
2015	Ramen Daisuki Koizumi-san	Osawa Yu	Also specials in 2016	
2015	Japan Airlines Flight 123 crash 30th anniversary			
2016	Mothers			
2024	The Tiger and Her Wings	Hitomi Fukuda	Asadora	
2026	The Scent of the Wind	Asa	Asadora	

=== Film ===
List of acting performances in film
Year	Title	Role	Notes	Source
2004	Be with You	Aya		
2011	Iris: The Last			
2011	Rock: Wanko no Shima			
2013	Saitama Kazoku Hakabanoto			
2014	Blossoms Bloom	Sakiko Osaki		
2014	Gekijōban Zero	Sakuya Itsuki		
2016	9 Windows			
2016	The Little Match Girl	Kanoko Tanaka		
2017	Our Meal for Tomorrow	Emiri Suzuhara		
2025	True Beauty: Before	Miho Mashima		
2025	True Beauty: After	Miho Mashima		
2026	Urusai Kono Oto no Zenbu	Namikawa		

=== Anime ===
List of voice performances in anime
Year	Title	Role	Notes	Source
2016	Endride	Alicia		
2017–18	Kirakira PreCure a la Mode	Ichika Usami / Cure Whip		
2018–19	Aikatsu Friends!	Maika Chōno		
2019–20	Aikatsu on Parade!	Maika Chōno		
2020	Haikyu!!: Land vs Sky	Mika Yamaka		
2022	Insect Land	Charlotte		

List of voice performances in anime feature films
Year	Title	Role	Notes	Source
2004	Naruto the Movie: Ninja Clash in the Land of Snow	Koyuki Kazehana		
2011	A Letter to Momo	Momo Miyaura		
2017	Pretty Cure Dream Stars!	Ichika Usami / Cure Whip		
2017	Kirakira Pretty Cure a la Mode the Movie: Crisply! The Memory of Mille-feuille!	Ichika Usami / Cure Whip		
2018	Pretty Cure Super Stars!	Ichika Usami / Cure Whip		
2018	Hugtto! PreCure Futari wa Pretty Cure: All Stars Memories	Ichika Usami / Cure Whip		
2019	Pretty Cure Miracle Universe	Ichika Usami / Cure Whip		
2021	Hula Fulla Dance	Kanna Kamakura		

=== Dubbing roles ===
List of voice performances in dubbing
Title	Role	Voice dub for, notes	Source
Bleeding Steel	Nancy / Xixi	Ouyang Nana	
Halloween	Allyson Nelson	Andi Matichak	
Halloween Kills	Allyson Nelson	Andi Matichak	
Okja	Mija	Ahn Seo-hyun	
Spider-Man: Homecoming	Liz Toomes	Laura Harrier	
The Vanishing of Sidney Hall	Melody Jameson	Elle Fanning	
Winx Club (animated TV series) (Japanese dubbing roles)	Bloom	Letizia Ciampa	
