= Kirakira Pretty Cure a la Mode the Movie: Crisply! The Memory of Mille-feuille! =

2017 film by Yutaka Tsuchida

- Key visual for the film
- Japanese: 映画 キラキラ☆プリキュアアラモード パリッと！想い出のミルフィーユ！
- Revised Hepburn: Eiga Kirakira ☆ Purikyua Ara Mōdo: Paritto! Omoide no Mirufīyu!
- Directed by: Yutaka Tsuchida
- Screenplay by: Isao Muruyama
- Based on: Pretty Cure by Izumi Todo
- Starring: Karen Miyama; Haruka Fukuhara; Tomo Muranaka; Saki Fujita; Nanako Mori; Inori Minase; Mika Kanai
- Cinematography: Kenji Takahashi
- Edited by: Yoshihiro Aso
- Music by: Yuki Hayashi
- Production company: Toei Animation
- Distributed by: Toei Company, Ltd.
- Release date: October 28, 2017
- Running time: 65 minutes
- Country: Japan
- Language: Japanese

Kirakira Pretty Cure a la Mode the Movie: Crisply! The Memory of Mille-feuille! (Japanese: 映画 キラキラ☆プリキュアアラモード パリッと！想い出のミルフィーユ！, Hepburn: Eiga Kirakira ☆ Purikyua Ara Mōdo: Paritto! Omoide no Mirufīyu!) is a 2017 Japanese animated action fantasy film based on the Pretty Cure franchise created by Izumi Todo, and its fourteenth series, Kirakira Pretty Cure a la Mode. The film is directed by Yutaka Tsuchida, written by Isao Murayama, and produced by Toei Animation. The film was released in Japan on October 28, 2017, as a double feature with a 5-minute CG animated short film, Petit Dream Stars! Let's la Cookin'? Showtime! (Petit☆ドリームスターズ！レッツ・ラ・クッキン？ショータイム！, Puchi ☆ Dorīmu Sutāzu! Rettsu Ra Kukkin? Shōtaimu!).

Featuring the Pretty Cure teams from Witchy Pretty Cure!, Ichika and others attend a patisseire competition in Paris, France.

== Plot ==
=== Petit Dream Stars! Let's la Cookin'? Showtime! ===
The fairies Pekorin, Mofurun, Pafu and Aroma are baking cookies together. As they've ran out of flour, Pekorin instructs Pafu to get more flour from a big container, but realizes that she got the wrong powder, as the cookie mix turns into a dragon. They flee as the dragon chases them, but Pekorin uses the Miracle Lights to stop the dragon. The dragon turns into a pile of baked cookies, and the fairies soon decorate them, pleased with the outcome. But another dragon pops up, shocking them.

=== Crisply! The Memory of Mille-feuille! ===
As Ichika and the others are doing a live demonstration at the Kirakira Patisserie in Paris, a sentient evil whisk pops up, and the girls transform to fight it. Then, a whisk curses Parfait, which causes her to revert to her fairy form as Cure Kirarin. Later that night at the sweets convention, Ciel encounters Jean-Pierre, a patisserie who she and Pikario studied under in France years ago and saved them from a flock of crows. But after Pikario abruptly departed Paris and Kirarin was scouted by Solaine, he was left alone. Sometime later, he encountered Cook and appointed her as his assistant. He invites the girls to his workshop, where Cook pops up from the recipe book and reveals herself to be Jean's self-proclaimed assistant. Ciel them makes cream for Jean, but he disapproves and scolds her, telling her not to use her weak state of mind as an excuse.

The next day, Ciel's skills haven't improved and Ichika and the others help her to make mille-feuille. As they finish baking, the evil whisk appears again and curses the contestants, and Pekorin deduces that the whisk is the culprit. After arriving at Jean-Pierre's workshop, Yukari also deduces that Cook is the culprit behind the whisk and Jean-Pierre's odd behavior. Cook sets the experimental sweets loose in the city, and the Cures try to stop them but Cook turns them into animals that oppose their themes. Then the Witchy Pretty Cure! team: Cures Miracle, Magical and Felice arrive and fight Cook's minions. The Cures arrive to Jean-Pierre's basement as Cook pushes him into the batter, turning him into an Ultimate Sweet.

Ciel tries to transform, even as the curse is preventing her from doing so. But with the power of the Miracle Lights, the Cures are freed from their curse and gain an upgraded form. Cook discourages the Cures, but Macaron realizes that Cook was an aspiring patissier who was betrayed by humans. The Cures then decorate the mille-feuille and give it to Jean-Pierre, freeing him from Cook's influence. In a last-ditch effort to defeat the Cures, Cook becomes an Ultimate Sweet and attacks them, but the mille-feuille becomes a special Animal Sweet and the Cures use its powers to defeat Cook with "Pretty Cure Animal Go Round". In the end, Ciel is the runner-up in the awards ceremony, but isn't discouraged and vows to be victorious next time.

During the credits, the Cures return the Eiffel Tower to its original place and Jean-Pierre finds an apprentice that resembles Cook.

== Voice cast ==
- Karen Miyama as Ichika Usami/Cure Whip
- Haruka Fukuhara as Himari Arisugawa/Cure Custard
- Tomo Muranaka as Aoi Tategami/Cure Gelato
- Saki Fujita as Yukari Kotozume/Cure Macaron
- Nanako Mori as Akira Tenjō/Cure Chocolat
- Inori Minase as Kirarin/Ciel Kirahoshi/Cure Parfait
- Mika Kanai as Pekorin
- Yū Mizushima as Elder
- Junko Minagawa as Pikario
- Rie Takahashi as Mirai Asahina/Cure Miracle
- Yui Horie as Riko Izayoi/Cure Magical
- Saori Hayami as Kotoha Hanami/Cure Felice
- Ayaka Saitō as Mofurun
- Onoe Matsuya II as Jean-Pierre Zylberstein
- Aoi Yūki as Cook

Nao Tōyama and Shiho Kokido, the voices of Pafu and Aroma from Go! Princess PreCure, reprised their roles for the Petit Dream Stars! Let's la Cookin'? Showtime! short.

== Production ==
In June 2017, a standalone film for Kirakira Pretty Cure a la Mode was announced. Yutaka Tsuchida, who directed Pretty Cure All Stars: Singing with Everyone♪ Miraculous Magic!, directs the film, with Isao Murayama, who wrote the Pretty Cure All Stars DX trilogy and Witchy Pretty Cure! series, providing the screenplay and Pretty Cure episode animation director Katsumi Tamegai providing character designs and chief animation direction In September of that year, it was announced that Onoe Matsuya II and Aoi Yūki were cast as Jean-Pierre Zylberstein and Cook respectively, and the following month it was announced that the film will feature the Cures from Witchy Pretty Cure!.

== Release ==
The film was released in theaters in Japan on October 28, 2017, as a double feature alongside a 5-minute CG animated short film, Petit Dream Stars! Let's la Cookin'? Showtime!.

== Reception ==
=== Box office ===
The film ranked number 1 out of top 10 in the Japanese box office in its opening weekend.
