= Nanako Mori =

Japanese actress and voice actress (born 1988)

- 森 なな子
- Born: February 13, 1988 (age 38); Fukuoka, Fukuoka Prefecture, Japan
- Occupations: Actress; voice actress; narrator
- Years active: 2005–present
- Agent: Mausu Promotion
- Height: 167 cm (5 ft 6 in)
- Spouse: Undisclosed (m. 2019)
- Children: 1

Nanako Mori (森 なな子, Mori Nanako; born February 13, 1988) is a Japanese actress, voice actress and narrator. She is signed to the Mausu Promotion agency.

== Career ==
Under the stage name Chihaya Saeki, in 2005 she joined the Takarazuka Revue, where she was an otokoyaku in the Snow Troupe. She left the Takarazuka Revue in 2009 and began performing under her real name. She was a finalist in the Miss Universe Japan competition in 2012. She became part of the cast of Kirakira PreCure a la Mode in 2017.

== Filmography ==
=== Television animation ===
2010s

- Cross Ange (2014), Hikaru
- Kirakira PreCure a la Mode (2017), Akira Kenjō / Cure Chocolat
- Sakura Quest (2017), Angelica
- Megalobox (2018), Yukiko Shirato
- Sirius the Jaeger (2018), Dorothea
- Bloom Into You (2018), Miyako Kodama
- Fruits Basket (2019), Akimoto

2020s

- Magia Record (2020), Kanae Yukino
- Megalobox 2: Nomad (2021), Yukiko Shirato
- Lupin the 3rd Part 6 (2022), Arianna
- Shinobi no Ittoki (2022), Kominami Mitsuhashi
- The Iceblade Sorcerer Shall Rule the World (2023), Abby Garnet
- World Dai Star (2023), Noa Hiiragi
- Reborn as a Vending Machine, I Now Wander the Dungeon (2023), Shirley
- Brave Bang Bravern! (2024), Nina Kowalski
- I Parry Everything (2024), Ines
- Suicide Squad Isekai as Knoll
- A Terrified Teacher at Ghoul School! (2024), Yuri Renjō

=== Theatrical animation ===
- No Game No Life Zero (2017), Rafil
- Pretty Cure Dream Stars! (2017), Akira Kenjo / Cure Chocolat
- KiraKira PreCure à la Mode: Crisply! The Memory of Mille-feuille! (2017), Akira Kenjō / Cure Chocolat
- Mobile Suit Gundam SEED Freedom (2024), Cagalli Yula Athha
- Kuramerukagari (2024), Shiina

=== Net animation ===
2020s

- Japan Sinks: 2020 (2020), Nami Miura
- JoJo's Bizarre Adventure: Stone Ocean (2021), Shaved Head Prisoner
- Kotaro Lives Alone (2022), Nozaki
- Gundam: Requiem for Vengeance (2024), Iria Solari

=== Video games ===
- Street Fighter V (2016), Satsuki
- Spider-Man (2018), Mary Jane Watson
- Soulcalibur VI (2018), Taki
- Fate/Grand Order (2018), Prince of Lanling
- Magia Record (2018), Kanae Yukino
- The Curse of Kudan (2019), Sawako Iwami
- Dragalia Lost (2020), Kirsty
- Nioh 2 (2020), Hide
- Arknights (2020), Dur-Nar
- The Last of Us: Part II (2020), Abby
- Cyberpunk 2077 (2020), Hanako Arasaka
- Famicom Detective Club: The Missing Heir (2021), Katsuko Ohnishi
- Lost Epic (2022), Cecilia
- Soul Hackers 2 (2022), Figue
- Genshin Impact (2020), Arlecchino
- Overwatch 2 (2022), Venture
- Bayonetta 3 (2022), Madama Butterfly
- Goddess of Victory: Nikke (2024), Rouge
- Monster Hunter Wilds (2025), Gemma
- Silent Hill f (2025), Junko Kinuta

=== Dubbing ===
==== Live-action ====
- 9/11, Tina (Olga Fonda)
- Brotherhood of Blades II: The Infernal Battlefield, Ding Baiying (Xin Zhilei)
- Burnt, Anne Marie (Alicia Vikander)
- The Cider House Rules (Netflix edition), Candy Kendall (Charlize Theron)
- Darkest Hour, Elizabeth Layton (Lily James)
- The Darkest Minds, Cate (Mandy Moore)
- Death on the Nile, Katherine (Susannah Fielding)
- Debris, Finola Jones (Riann Steele)
- The Driftless Area, Jean (Aubrey Plaza)
- Drive-Away Dolls, Marian (Geraldine Viswanathan)
- End of a Gun, Lisa Durant (Jade Ewen)
- Euphoria, Jules Vaughn (Hunter Schafer)
- Extraordinary Attorney Woo, Woo Young-woo, (Park Eun-bin)
- Fantastic Beasts: The Crimes of Grindelwald, Leta Lestrange (Zoë Kravitz)
- Freaky, Char Kessler (Dana Drori)
- The Girl in the Spider's Web, Lisbeth Salander (Claire Foy)
- Godzilla: King of the Monsters, Lauren Griffin (Elizabeth Ludlow)
- The King's Man, Mata Hari (Valerie Pachner)
- Knock at the Cabin, Sabrina (Nikki Amuka-Bird)
- The Last of Us, Abby (Kaitlyn Dever)
- Mother, May I Sleep with Danger?, Pearl (Emily Meade)
- Mother's Day, Kristin (Britt Robertson)
- Pacific Rim: Uprising, Cadet Viktoria (Ivanna Sakhno)
- Paris Can Wait, Carole (Élodie Navarre)
- Prodigal Son, Ainsley Whitly (Halston Sage)
- Roboshark, Veronica (Laura Dale)
- Sharp Objects, Amma Crellin (Eliza Scanlen)
- Solace, Agent Katherine Cowles (Abbie Cornish)
- Spotlight, Sacha Pfeiffer (Rachel McAdams)
- St. Elmo's Fire (2022 The Cinema edition), Dale Biberman (Andie MacDowell)
- Texas Chainsaw Massacre, Melody (Sarah Yarkin)
- The Third Way of Love, Jiang Xinyao (Jessie Chiang)
- Underwater, Emily Haversham (Jessica Henwick)
- Winning Time: The Rise of the Lakers Dynasty, Jeanie Buss (Hadley Robinson)

==== Animation ====
- The Addams Family, Bethany
- Hazbin Hotel, Carmilla Carmine
- Miraculous: Tales of Ladybug & Cat Noir, Kagami Tsurugi

==== Video games ====
- Spider-Man 2, Mary Jane Watson
