= Kirakira Pretty Cure a la Mode =

Japanese anime television series

- Kirakira ☆ PreCure a la Mode
- Cover of the final Blu-ray volume, featuring the six Cures. In clockwise order: Cure Chocolat, Cure Macaron, Cure Custard, Cure Whip, Cure Parfait and Cure Gelato in the center.

キラキラ☆プリキュアアラモード (Kirakira ☆ Purikyua Ara Mōdo)
- Genre: Magical girl
- Created by: Izumi Todo
- Anime television series
- Directed by: Kohei Kureta; Yukio Kaizawa
- Produced by: Akira Tanaka; Risa Endō; Yu Kaminoki
- Written by: Jin Tanaka
- Music by: Yuki Hayashi
- Studio: Toei Animation
- Licensed by: Crunchyroll
- Original network: ANN (ABC, TV Asahi)
- Original run: February 5, 2017 – January 28, 2018
- Episodes: 49
- Manga
- Written by: Izumi Todo
- Illustrated by: Futago Kamikita
- Published by: Kodansha
- Imprint: Wide KC
- Magazine: Nakayoshi
- Original run: March 2017 – December 2017
- Volumes: 2
- Anime film
- Kirakira Pretty Cure a la Mode the Movie: Crisply! The Memory of Mille-feuille!

Kirakira PreCure a la Mode (Japanese: キラキラ☆プリキュアアラモード, Hepburn: Kirakira ☆ Purikyua Ara Mōdo; lit. "Glittering Pretty Cure à la Mode"), stylized as Kirakira☆PreCure a la Mode, is a 2017 Japanese magical girl anime series produced by Toei Animation and the fourteenth installment in Izumi Todo's Pretty Cure metaseries, featuring the twelfth generation of Cures. It is directed by Kohei Kureta and Yukio Kaizawa. Jin Tanaka wrote the script, and Marie Ino designed the characters. The cake and sweets designs were handled by pâtissière Junko Fukuda. The series began airing on all All-Nippon News Network stations in Japan on February 5, 2017, succeeding Witchy PreCure! in its timeslot. It was then succeeded by Hug! PreCure on February 4, 2018. The series' main topics are happiness and creativity, with desserts and animals as its motifs.

== Plot ==
Ichika Usami is a second-year middle school student who loves sweets and wishes to work in a patisserie, but struggles to bake. One day, she encounters a fairy named Pekorin, who is able to detect "Kirakiraru", an element residing in sweets that represent the feelings put into them. However, evil fairies start to steal the Kirakiraru for themselves, leaving the sweets black and lifeless. Determined to protect the sweets, Ichika gains the power of the Legendary Patisserie and transforms into the Pretty Cure, Cure Whip, to protect the Kirakiraru. Joined by five other Pretty Cures, Ichika opens up a mobile sweet shop called the Kirakira Patisserie and spends her days making sweets while fighting against those who seek to steal Kirakiraru and bring misfortune to the world.

== Production ==
The series was first registered by Toei at the Japanese Copyright Office on October 25, 2016. A month after its registration, Toei opened a teaser site for the series with the catchphrase "Create, Taste and Battle!". On December 26, 2016, Toei updated the official website with the main characters and staff, alongside the two theme songs and the official release date. This revealed the series to be the third series in the franchise to utilize a five-person team. It was also confirmed that the main characters were running a sweets shop and that the series would still feature battle scenes, but would have a different style of fighting called Colorful Pop Battles to fit with the series theme.

In an interview with the team behind the series, they expressed several concepts being used and adapted in the series. The producers stated that a five-person team was being used after ten years to differentiate it from the previous series, Witchy Pretty Cure!, which initially had a duo that later expanded to become a trio. Producer Yu Kaminoki said that "Running a sweets shop/bakery is one of many jobs girls have dreamed of being when they grow up, and that is a good theme for the next series. However, deciding how fighting elements would fit in a dessert-themed series is hard and is not compatible with Pretty Cure or any fighting girls series". They also stated that "using animals as a secondary motif could help balance the first motif of the series and is possible with imagination, to actually make the series work than just using sweets as the series' motif". Lastly, they said that the "animal motif would extend to the main character, Ichika, who decorates and creates desserts with an animal motif due to her huge imagination."

While discussing the staff, the producer said that Kohei Kureta and Yukio Kaizawa were chosen to direct the series to lessen the burden in production while coming up with newer concepts. Yukio Kaizawa was chosen due to his work with the Cure Flora and the Mischievous Mirror short film, and he stated that as director, he wanted to incorporate new ideas into the series. Kaizawa also stated that it was his first time directing a series in Toei's Sunday morning lineup since joining the staff, and that directing alongside Kohei Kureta would be a challenge. Kureta was grateful that he could work alongside him. Despite working together, both directors will direct the series in different episodes and are responsible for how the series will turn out.

For the characters, the staff made each of their personalities unique to match the animal motif of the series. The most unique one is Akira, as the producers based her overall role on the "Otokoyaku (男役; "Male Role") actresses of Takarazuka Revue, a theatrical group owned by Hankyu Corporation. Nanako Mori said that her experience with the group in the past is the inspiration for her role in the anime, and that playing a big sister in the series is a first.

== Media ==
=== Anime ===
The anime began airing on All-Nippon News Network stations in Japan, including ABC and TV Asahi, on February 5, 2017, replacing the previous series, Witchy PreCure!, in its initial timeslot. The opening theme is "SHINE!! Kirakira ☆ PreCure a la Mode" (SHINE！！キラキラ☆プリキュアアラモード, SHINE！！ Kirakira ☆ Purikyua Ara Mōdo) by Yuri Komagata, while the ending theme for the first 22 episodes is "Let's La Cooking☆Showtime" (レッツ・ラ・クッキン☆ショータイム, Rettsu Ra Kukkin ☆ Shōtaimu) by Kanako Miyamoto. From episode 23 onwards, a second ending theme is used, called "Shubidubi☆Sweets Time" (シュビドゥビ☆スイーツタイム, Shubidubi ☆ Suītsu Taimu) by Miyamoto. The music of the series is composed by Yuki Hayashi (My Hero Academia, Haikyū!!, Gundam Build Fighters). The first single of the series was released on March 1, 2017, along with the first official soundtrack on May 31, 2017, titled Precure Sound Decoration!!. A second official soundtrack for the series was released on November 29, 2017, with the title Precure Sound Go Round!!. A vocal best album titled Suite☆Etude☆A La Mode was released on January 24, 2018, which featured songs from the anime and its movie. Crunchyroll streamed the series with original Japanese audio and English subtitles.

=== Films ===
The characters of the series appeared alongside characters from Go! Princess PreCure and Witchy PreCure! in the crossover film, Pretty Cure Dream Stars!, which was released in Japan on March 18, 2017. A film based on the series, titled KiraKira☆PreCure à la Mode: Crisply! The Memory of Mille-feuille! (映画 キラキラ☆プリキュアアラモード パリッと！想い出のミルフィーユ！, Eiga Kirakira ☆ Purikyua Ara Mōdo: Paritto! Omoide no Mirufīyu!), including a fully CG animated short titled Petit☆Dream Stars! Let's・la・Cookin'? Showtime! (Petit☆ドリームスターズ！レッツ・ラ・クッキン？ショータイム！, Puchi ☆ Dorīmu Sutāzu! Rettsu Ra Kukkin? Shōtaimu!) was released on October 28, 2017.

Pretty Cure Super Stars! (映画 プリキュアスーパースターズ！, Eiga Purikyua Sūpā Sutāzu!), was released on March 17, 2018.

Hug! Pretty Cure Futari wa Pretty Cure: All Stars Memories (映画 HUGっと!プリキュア♡ふたりはプリキュア オールスターズメモリーズ, Eiga Hagutto! Purikyua ♡ Futari wa Puri Kyua Ōru Sutāzu Memorīzu), was released on October 27, 2018.

Pretty Cure Miracle Universe (映画 プリキュアミラクルユニバース, Eiga Purikyua Mirakuru Yunivāsu), was released on March 16, 2019.

=== Manga ===
The manga adaptation of the anime was serialized in the March 2017 issue of Kodansha's Nakayoshi magazine, written and illustrated by Futago Kamikita and ended serialization on December 29, 2017. The first tankōbon was released on August 10, 2017, with the second released on March 13, 2018.

No.	Original release date	Original ISBN	English release date	English ISBN
1	August 10, 2017	978-4-06-337866-5	N/A	—
2	March 13, 2018	978-4-06-511046-1	N/A	—

== Promotion and reception ==
To promote the anime series, they launched the campaign for the Kirakira Pretty Cure a la Mode themed hotel rooms at Shirakaba Resort's Ike no Taira Hotel in Lake Shirakaba, Nagano Prefecture.

Crunchyroll News' "7 Great Gay and Lesbian Relationships In Anime" compared the relationship between Yukari Kotozume/Cure Macaron and Akira Kenjou/Cure Chocolat to that of Sailor Neptune and Sailor Uranus. In an interview for Animate Times, Yukari's voice actress Saki Fujita said while that the staff denied that this was the case due to the show's younger demographic, she expressed that there was room to interpret this relationship as love.

Preceded by Witchy PreCure!	Kirakira Pretty Cure a la Mode; 2017-2018	Succeeded by Hug! Pretty Cure
