= Pretty Cure films =

Series of Japanese anime films

プリキュア映画 (Purikyua eiga)
- Genre: Magical girl
- Created by: Izumi Todo
- Anime films
- Pretty Cure Max Heart the Movie (2005); Pretty Cure Max Heart 2: Friends of the Snow-Laden Sky (2005); Pretty Cure Splash Star the Movie: Tick-Tock Crisis Hanging by a Thin Thread! (2006); Yes! PreCure 5 the Movie: Great Miraculous Adventure in the Mirror Kingdom! (2007); Yes! PreCure 5 GoGo! the Movie: Happy Birthday in the Sweets Kingdom (2008); Fresh Pretty Cure! the Movie: The Toy Kingdom has Lots of Secrets!? (2009); HeartCatch PreCure! the Movie: Fashion Show in the Flower Capital... Really?! (2010); Suite PreCure the Movie: Take it back! The Miraculous Melody that Connects Hearts (2011); Smile PreCure! the Movie: Big Mismatch in a Picture Book! (2012); DokiDoki! PreCure the Movie: Mana's Getting Married!!? The Dress of Hope that Connects to the Future (2013); HappinessCharge PreCure! the Movie: The Ballerina of the Land of Dolls (2014); Go! Princess Pretty Cure the Movie: Go! Go!! Gorgeous Triple Feature!!! (2015); Witchy Pretty Cure! The Movie: Wonderous! Cure Mofurun! (2016); Kirakira Pretty Cure a la Mode the Movie: Crisply! The Memory of Mille-feuille! (2017); Star Twinkle Pretty Cure the Movie: These Feeling within The Song of Stars (2019); Healin' Good Pretty Cure the Movie: GoGo! Big Transformation! The Town of Dreams (2021); Tropical-Rouge! Pretty Cure the Movie: The Snow Princess and the Miraculous Ring! (2021); Delicious Party Pretty Cure the Movie: Dreaming Children's Lunch! (2022); Wonderful Pretty Cure! The Movie: A Grand Adventure in a Thrilling Game World! (2024); You and Idol Pretty Cure the Movie: For You! Our Kirakilala Concert! (2025); Star Detective Precure! the Movie: The Mysterious Garden and The Pair's Secret (2026)

Pretty Cure films (プリキュア映画, Purikyua eiga) is a series of Japanese anime films produced by Toei Animation based on Izumi Todo's Pretty Cure anime television franchise. Each movie features a storyline which crosses over characters from all the Pretty Cure anime series, The following is a list of Japanese animated films produced by Toei Animation, based on Izumi Todo's Pretty Cure (Precure) anime television franchise, also known of Japan. Beginning with 2005's Pretty Cure Max Heart, which had two films released for it, each subsequent series in the franchise has received a film, which is usually released towards the end of each year. In addition, the Pretty Cure All Stars films, which feature storylines that team up characters from every series to date, began releasing annually in Japan starting in 2009, often airing in the spring of each year. The films often incorporate electrical flashlights known as Miracle Lights, which originally debuted in Yes! PreCure 5 the Movie: Great Miraculous Adventure in the Mirror Kingdom!. These devices are handed out to audience members during theatrical screenings so they can participate in the film's climax. In 2020, beginning with Pretty Cure Miracle Leap: A Wonderful Day with Everyone, the crossover movies shifted from massive team-ups to smaller affairs featuring Pretty Cure teams from 3 consecutive series.

== Films ==
=== Pretty Cure Max Heart the Movie (2005) ===
Pretty Cure Max Heart the Movie (映画 ふたりはプリキュア マックスハート, Eiga Futari wa Purikyua Makkusu Hāto), is the first film based on the Pretty Cure franchise, and the first of two movies based on the second television series, Pretty Cure Max Heart, was released on April 16, 2005.

Round, Square, Marquis, Oval, Heart, Pear and Triliant, five fairies who reside in the Garden of Hope (希望の園, Kibō no Sono), call in the Pretty Cure to save their world from a witch from the Dark Zone who wants to take the Garden of Hope's Diamond Line, which consists of several pieces of jewelry worn by the Queen of Hope on her birthday. These jewels, if fallen in the wrong hands, will cause the Garden of Hope to become unbalanced, thereby causing everything else to become destroyed and enabling the restoration of the Dark King.

=== Pretty Cure Max Heart 2: Friends of the Snow-Laden Sky (2005) ===
Pretty Cure Max Heart 2: Friends of the Snow-Laden Sky (映画 ふたりはプリキュア Max Heart 2 雪空のともだち, Eiga Futari wa Purikyua Makkusu Hāto Tsu Yukizora no Tomodachi), is the second film based on the Pretty Cure franchise, and the second of two movies based on the second television series, Pretty Cure Max Heart, was released on December 10, 2005.

Nagisa, Honoka, and Hikari come across the egg of a baby Phoenix that they name Hinata, and are suddenly forced to save her from members of the Dark Kingdom, Freezen and Frozen, that have come to steal Hinata's life force. They are pit against each other but overcome the forces of the Dark Kingdom.

=== PreCure Splash Star the Movie: Tick-Tock Crisis Hanging by a Thin Thread! (2006) ===
PreCure Splash Star: Tick-Tock Crisis Hanging by a Thin Thread! (映画 ふたりはプリキュア スプラッシュ☆スター チクタク危機一髪!, Eiga Futari wa Purikyua Supurashu Sutā Tiku Taku Kiki Ippatsu!), based on the third series, PreCure Splash Star, was released on December 9, 2006.

When the friendship between Saki and Mai starts to waver when they try to enter a karaoke contest together, time suddenly stops. Journeying to the Clock Kingdom, Saki and Mai must reconcile their differences in order to stop the evil Sirloin, who wants to stop time forever.

=== Yes! PreCure 5 the Movie: Great Miraculous Adventure in the Mirror Kingdom! (2007) ===
Yes! PreCure 5 the Movie: Great Miraculous Adventure in the Mirror Kingdom! (映画 Yes!プリキュア5 鏡の国のミラクル大冒険!, Eiga Iesu! Purikyua Faibu: Kagami no Kuni no Mirakuru Daibōken!), based on the fourth series, Yes! PreCure 5, was released on November 10, 2007.

The Pretty Cure 5 travel to the Mirror Kingdom in order to defeat the villain Shadow, who has taken over the Kingdom and tries to take the Dream Collet in order to grant his wish of world domination. However, when the girls meet Shadow and are prepared to fight him, he surprises them by recreating the Crystals of the Mirror Kingdom into Dark versions of themselves, who declare to be their opponents. In order to find and defeat Shadow, the Pretty Cure must defeat their Doppelgängers and retrieve the crystals.

=== Yes! PreCure 5 GoGo! the Movie: Happy Birthday in the Sweets Kingdom (2008) ===
Yes! PreCure 5 GoGo! the Movie: Happy Birthday in the Sweets Kingdom (映画 Yes!プリキュア5GoGo! お菓子の国のハッピーバースディ♪, Eiga Iesu! Purikyua Faibu GōGō! Okashi no Kuni no Happī Bāsudi♪), based on Yes! PreCure 5's follow-up series, Yes! Precure 5 GoGo!, the fifth series overall, was released on November 8, 2008.

On Nozomi's birthday, all of her friends plan a party for her. But when the princess of the Sweets Kingdom shows up and tells them the Sweets Kingdom is in danger, the Cures set off to find out who is behind all the mysterious goings on in the Sweets Kingdom. They soon discover that a villain named Mushiban has taken over the kingdom so he can eat all the delicious sweets himself. But with the power of the Miracle Lights, Dream transforms into Shining Dream to defeat Mushiban and finally celebrate her birthday with her friends.

=== Fresh PreCure! the Movie: The Toy Kingdom has Lots of Secrets!? (2009) ===
Fresh PreCure! the Movie: The Kingdom of Toys has Lots of Secrets!? (映画 フレッシュプリキュア! おもちゃの国は秘密がいっぱい!?, Eiga Furesshu Purikyua! Omocha no Kuni wa Himitsu ga Ippai!?), based on the sixth series, Fresh Pretty Cure!, was released on October 31, 2009.

Love, Miki, Inori and Setsuna are planning a pajama party, but soon they find all the toys in Clover Town are disappearing. An old stuffed rabbit of Love's called Usapyon appears and tells everyone the Toy Kingdom is in danger. The Cures travel to the Toy Kingdom to find an evil monster named Toymajin is stealing all of the toys because he believes children don't really care about them, and just throw them away when they get bored of them. But with the power of the Miracle Lights, Peach transforms into Cure Angel before rescuing the toys and convincing Toymajin that children really do care about them.

=== Heart Catch PreCure the Movie: Fashion Show in the Flower Capital... Really?! (2010) ===
Heart Catch PreCure the Movie: Fashion Show in the Flower Capital... Really?! (映画 ハートキャッチプリキュア！花の都でファッションショー···ですか！？, Eiga HātoKyatchi Purikyua! Hana no Miyako de Fasshon Shō...Desu ka!?), based on the seventh series, HeartCatch PreCure!, was released on October 30, 2010.

Tsubomi, Erika, Itsuki, and Yuri all get the opportunity to go to Paris in France, where Erika's mother is holding a fashion show. While in Paris, they meet a mysterious boy named Oliver. However, Baron Salamander of the Desert Apostles appears, and the girls transform into PreCures to defend Paris.

=== Suite PreCure the Movie: Take it Back! The Miraculous Melody That Connects Hearts (2011) ===
Suite PreCure the Movie: Take it back! The Miraculous Melody that Connects Hearts (映画 スイートプリキュア♪ とりもどせ! 心がつなぐ奇跡のメロディ♪, Eiga Suīto Purikyua ♪ Torimodose! Kokoro ga Tsunagu Kiseki no Merodi), based on the eighth series, Suite Precure♪, was released on October 29, 2011.

Hibiki, Kanade, Eren, and Ako have managed to free Mephisto from the evil influence of Noise. Mephisto pays a visit to Ako with the intention of bringing her back to Major Land to live with her parents again. Ako, who misses her parents, agrees, but before they can leave, all the music suddenly disappears from Kanon Town. Upon arriving in Major Land where people are forced to play with no music coming out, Mephisto, Ako, and the other PreCure encounter Ako's childhood friend, Suzu, who claims that Aphrodite is allegedly responsible for stealing the world's music. As Hibiki, Kanade and Eren escort Suzu to her home, Ako and Mephisto confront Aphrodite, who captures Ako and sends three servants called the Major Three after the others to try to obtain the Healing Chest. As they send a Negatone after the Cures, Suzu escapes with the Healing Chest. As the others struggle against the Major Three, Mephisto helps to free Ako by singing her favourite song, helping everyone realise music that comes from the heart and allowing the Cures to defeat the Major Three. Aphrodite reveals she is being possessed by an evil known as Howling, becoming willing to sacrifice herself so that Howling can be destroyed with her. Not willing to kill Aphrodite, Mephisto forces Howling to leave Aphrodite's body. As Howling overwhelms the PreCure, Suzu and the other citizens use their power to help them, restoring everyone to normal. Howling transforms into his true form and captures Kanade, but Hibiki's unwillingness to give up grants her the power to become Crescendo Cure Melody and together with the others manages to defeat Howling. Afterwards, Ako decides to stay in Kanon Town with the other PreCures.

=== Smile PreCure! the Movie: Big Mismatch in a Picture Book! (2012) ===
Smile PreCure! the Movie: Big Mismatch in a Picture Book! (映画 スマイルプリキュア！ 絵本の中はみんなチグハグ！, Eiga Sumairu Purikyua! Ehon no Naka wa Minna Chiguhagu!), based on the ninth series, Smile PreCure!, was released on October 27, 2012.

When she was little, Miyuki came across a peculiar book with some of its pages missing, promising to one day write the ending herself. Back in the present, Miyuki, Akane, Yayoi, Nao, and Reika all go to a book expo where they come across a quaint little movie theater. Whilst watching the movie, a strange girl named Nico suddenly pops out of the screen, pursued by Kingaku and Gingaku. After the Cures manage to beat the two monsters, Nico takes them to the World of Picture Books, where characters from various fairy tales live. There, the girls are given the opportunity to live out roles of their favourite book protagonists; Cinderella, Issun-bōshi, Sun Wukong, Urashima Tarō and Momotarō. Things soon start turning weird, however, when the true protagonists wind up in each other's stories. These heroes are soon possessed by a dark force, causing them to show resentment towards the girls and attack them, wanting a world where stories have no endings. With the assistance of the stories' antagonists, the Cures fight to try and revert the heroes to normal. They soon learn the culprit is Nico, who holds resentment towards Miyuki for forgetting her promise to finish the story she lived in. Chasing Nico to the world of her story, Miyuki explains that in her book, Nico was a girl who brought smiles to others but was kidnapped by a dark force, at which point the ending was unknown. Miyuki had attempted to draw the rest of her story but gave up because she couldn't draw very well at the time. After some encouragement from Akane and the others, Miyuki becomes determined to make up with Nico and together they head towards the castle where she was captured. As Nico's hatred is fuelled by the Demon Lord that captured her, the girls fight off the fairytale heroes so Miyuki can try and reach Nico. Backed up by the support of her friends, who will never hate her despite their injuries, Miyuki conveys her feelings of gratitude to Nico for helping her learn to smile. Just then, the Demon Lord ensnares Nico, wanting to use the power of her hatred to take over the world. As she and the other's struggle against his attacks, Nico realises her true feelings which restores the lost pages of her book. After the girls are overpowered by the Demon Lord's attack, Miyuki takes a direct hit in order to protect Nico killing her instantly. Wanting to save her, Nico calls upon the power of the Miracle Wing Lights, which revives Miyuki and give her the power to become Ultra Cure Happy and purify the Demon Lord into his original form. Afterwards, Nico apologizes for her actions and vows to make her own story.

=== DokiDoki! PreCure the Movie: Mana's Getting Married!!? The Dress of Hope That Connects to the Future (2013) ===
DokiDoki! Precure the Movie: Mana's Getting Married!!? The Dress of Hope that Connects to the Future (映画 ドキドキ！プリキュア マナ結婚！！？未来につなぐ希望のドレス, Eiga Dokidoki! Purikyua Mana Kekkon!!? Mirai ni Tsunagu Kibō no Doresu), based on the tenth series, DokiDoki! PreCure, was released on October 26, 2013.

One day, Mana receives a wedding dress from her mother, which was previously worn by her late grandmother and her mother. Later, whilst discussing their elementary school days with Alice, Rikka, and Makoto, Mana recalls owning a dog named Mallow, who died when she was little. That night, a mysterious man named Marsh uses a clarinet to call forth forgotten and discarded objects that still feel they have use, combining together into a giant whale-shaped blimp in the sky. Marsh, who Mana doesn't seem to recognise, starts trapping people inside film reels, forcing them to relive their past memories for eternity, depriving them of their futures. He then summons three henchmen; Purple Buggy, Silver Clock, and Mannequin Carmine, to fight against the Cure, reassembling them no matter how many times they are destroyed. Overwhelming the Cures, Marsh traps them inside their own memories, with Mana finding herself in her elementary school days when both her grandmother and Maro were still alive. Meanwhile, Sharuru and the other fairies are approached by Bebel, a former acquaintance of Marsh, who informs them that they must venture inside the memories of their partners in order to save them. As Mana tries to find a way back to the real world, she finds the memories in this world are different from her own, as Rikka and Alice are nowhere to be found, but seems to enjoy being with Mallow. With help from Bebel, Sharuru and the others dive into their partners' memories, with Sharuru joining Mana just before she learns Mallow was hit by a car, which ends her film reels when she gives into the grief of losing her beloved dog. Cautious about Bebel's words that Mana will never give up, Marsh sends his henchmen after Rikka, Alice, and Makoto, deeming them a threat. Rikka and Alice manage to find each other within their memories, soon joined by their partners, whilst Davi convinces Makoto not to run away from the reality of the Trump Kingdom's situation. Rikka and Alice fight off against their opponents whilst Makoto is assisted by the arrival of Aguri, Cure Ace. Meanwhile, Mana, who can't stand returning to a world without Mallow, receives words of encouragement from her grandmother, allowing her to hear the support of her friends and find a way back to her world along with the others. As Marsh transforms into his true form, Mana, realising that Marsh is actually Mallow himself, takes on his attack, stating she has never once forgotten him, helping him to see the light. Just then, the clarinet that had been influencing Mallow travels forward in time to try and destroy the Cures' future. Using the Miracle Bouquet Lights, the Cures travel forward in time to the day of Mana's wedding and, with help from Mallow, reach the clarinet, who proves resilient to their attacks and delivers a critical blow to Mallow. Being left with no regrets, Mallow leaves behind his psyche, which gives Mana the powerful Engage Mode, allowing her to defeat the clarinet. After the girls return to the present and everyone who was imprisoned is freed, Bebel takes care of Maro's psyche, revealing herself to be Mana's grandmother.

=== HappinessCharge PreCure! the Movie: The Ballerina of the Land of Dolls (2014) ===
Happiness Charge PreCure! the Movie: The Ballerina of the Land of Dolls (映画 ハピネスチャージプリキュア！人形の国のバレリーナ, Eiga Hapinesuchāji Purikyua! Ningyō no Kuni no Barerīna), based on the eleventh series, Happiness Charge PreCure!, was released on October 11, 2014.

=== Go! Princess PreCure the Movie: Go! Go!! Gorgeous Triple Feature!!! (2015) ===
Go! Princess Pretty Cure the Movie: Go! Go!! Gorgeous Triple Feature!!! (映画 Go! プリンセスプリキュア Go! Go!! 豪華3本立て!!!, Eiga Gō! Purinsesu Purikyua Gō! Gō!! Gōka Sanbon Date!!!), based on the twelfth series, Go! Princess PreCure. Unlike the other films before it, which featured a single narrative, this film is a triple feature consisting of three parts; a cel-animated short, titled The Pumpkin Kingdom's Treasure (パンプキン王国のたからもの, Panpukin Ōkoku no Takaramono), and two fully CG animated shorts, titled Precure and Refi's Wonder Night! (プリキュアとレフィのワンダーナイト！, Purikyua to Refi no Wandā Naito!) and Cure Flora and the Mischievous Mirror (キュアフローラといたずらかがみ, Kyua Furōra to Itazura Kagami), was released on October 31, 2015. respectively. The film's theme song is titled "Kira Kira" by Every Little Thing.

=== Witchy PreCure! The Movie: Wonderous! Cure Mofurun! (2016) ===
Witchy PreCure! The Movie: Wonderous! Cure Mofurun! (映画 魔法つかいプリキュア！ 奇跡の変身！キュアモフルン！, Eiga Mahōtsukai Purikyua!: Kiseki no Henshin! Kyua Mofurun!), based on the thirteenth series, Witchy PreCure!, this film is a double feature including a fully CG animated short, titled Cure Miracle and Mofurun's Magic Lesson! (キュアミラクルとモフルンの魔法レッスン！, Kyua Mirakuru to Mofurun no Mahō Ressun!), was released on October 29, 2016.

=== KiraKira PreCure a la Mode the Movie: Crispy! The Memory of Mille-feuille! (2017) ===
KiraKira PreCure a la Mode: Crispy! The Memory of Mille-feuille! (映画 キラキラ☆プリキュアアラモード パリッと！想い出のミルフィーユ！, Eiga Kirakira ☆ Purikyua Ara Mōdo Paritto! Omoide no Mirufīyu!), based on the fourteenth series, Kirakira Pretty Cure a la Mode, this film is a double feature including a fully CG animated short, titled Petit☆Dream Stars! Let's・la・Cookin'? Showtime! (Petit☆ドリームスターズ！レッツ・ラ・クッキン？ショータイム！, Puchi ☆ Dorīmu Sutāzu! Rettsu Ra Kukkin? Shōtaimu!). The main cures from Witchy PreCure!, was released on October 28, 2017.

=== Star Twinkle PreCure The Movie: These Feeling Within the Song of Stars (2019) ===
Star Twinkle Pretty Cure The Movie: These Feeling Within the Song of Stars (映画 スター☆トゥインクルプリキュア 星のうたに想いをこめて, Eiga Sutā ☆ Tuinkuru Purikyua Hoshi no Uta ni Omoi o Komete), based on the sixteenth series, Star Twinkle PreCure, was released on October 19, 2019.

=== Healin' Good Pretty Cure the Movie: GoGo! Big Transformation! The Town of Dreams (2021) ===
Healin' Good Pretty Cure the Movie: GoGo! Big Transformation! The Town of Dreams (映画 ヒーリングっど♡プリキュア ゆめのまちでキュン！っとGoGo！大変身！！, Eiga Hīrin Guddo Purikyua Yume no Machi de Kyun! Tto GōGō! Daihenshin!!), based on the seventeenth series, Healin' Good Pretty Cure, The main cures from Yes! PreCure 5 GoGo!, this film is a double feature including a fully CG animated short, titled Tropical-Rouge! Pretty Cure the Movie: Petite Dive! Collaboration Dance Party! (映画 トロピカル～ジュ！プリキュア プチ とびこめ！コラボ♥ダンスパーティ！, Eiga Toropikarūju! Purikyua Puchi Tobikome! Korabo▽Dansu Pāti!). was released on March 20, 2021.

=== Tropical-Rouge! Pretty Cure the Movie: The Snow Princess and the Miraculous Ring! (2021) ===
Tropical-Rouge! Pretty Cure the Movie: The Snow Princess and the Miraculous Ring! (映画 トロピカル～ジュ！プリキュア 雪のプリンセスと奇跡の指輪！, Eiga Toropikarūju! Purikyua Yuki no Purinsesu to Kiseki no Yubiwa!), based on the eighteenth series, Tropical-Rouge! Pretty Cure, The main cures from HeartCatch PreCure!, was released on October 23, 2021.

=== Delicious Party Pretty Cure the Movie: Dreaming Children's Lunch! (2022) ===
Delicious Party Pretty Cure the Movie: Dreaming Children's Lunch! (映画デリシャスパーティ♡プリキュア 夢みる♡お子さまランチ！, Eiga Derishasu Pāti♡Purikyua Yume Miru ♡ Okosama Rānchu!), based on the nineteenth series, Delicious Party Pretty Cure, this film is a double feature including a fully CG animated short, titled My Precious Lunch (わたしだけのお子さまランチ, Watashi dake no okosama ranchi). was released on September 23, 2022.

=== Wonderful Precure! The Movie: A Grand Adventure in a Thrilling Game World! (2024) ===
Wonderful Precure! The Movie: A Grand Adventure in a Thrilling Game World! (わんだふるぷりきゅあ！ざ・むーびー！ドキドキ♡ゲームの世界で大冒険, Wandafuru Purikyua! Za・Mūbī! Dokidoki ♡ Gēmu no Sekai de Daibōken!), based on the twenty-first series, Wonderful Precure!, the main Cures from Witchy PreCure! & Soaring Sky! PreCure, was released on September 13, 2024.

=== You and Idol Precure the Movie: For You! Our Kirakilala Concert! (2025) ===
You and Idol Precure the Movie: For You! Our Kirakilala Concert! (映画キミとアイドルプリキュア♪ お待たせ！キミに届けるキラッキライブ！, Eiga Kimi to Aidoru Purikyua♪ Omatase! Kimi ni Todokeru Kirakiraibu!), based on twenty-second series, You and Idol Precure, the main Cures from Soaring Sky! Pretty Cure & Wonderful Pretty Cure!, was released on September 12, 2025.

=== Star Detective Precure! The Movie: The Mysterious Garden and a Secret Pair (2026) ===
Star Detective Precure! The Movie: The Mysterious Garden and a Secret Pair (映画名探偵プリキュア！不思議な庭と2人の秘密, Eiga Meitantei Purikyua! Fushigina niwa to 2-ri no himitsu), based on twenty-third series, Star Detective Precure!, the main Cures from Wonderful Pretty Cure! & You and Idol Pretty Cure, was released on September 18, 2026.

== Pretty Cure All Stars ==
No.	Title	Release date
1	Pretty Cure All Stars DX: Everyone's Friends - the Collection of Miracles! (映画 プリキュアオールスターズDX みんなともだちっ☆奇跡の全員大集合!, Eiga Purikyua Ōru Sutāzu Dirakkusu: Minna Tomodachi— Kiseki no Zenin Daishūgō!)	March 20, 2009
2	Pretty Cure All Stars DX2: Light of Hope - Protect the Rainbow Jewel! (映画 プリキュアオールスターズDX2 希望の光☆レインボージュエルを守れ!, Eiga Purikyua Ōru Sutāzu Dirakkusu Tsu: Kibou no Hikari Reinbō Jueru o Mamore!)	March 20, 2010
3	Pretty Cure All Stars DX3: Deliver the Future! The Rainbow-Colored Flower That Connects the World (映画 プリキュアオールスターズDX3 未来に届け!世界をつなぐ☆虹色の花, Eiga Purikyua Ōru Sutāzu Dirakkusu Surī: Mirai ni Todoke! Sekai o Tsunagu Niji-Iro no Hana!)	March 19, 2011
4	Pretty Cure All Stars New Stage: Friends of the Future (映画 プリキュアオールスターズNewStage みらいのともだち, Eiga Purikyua Ōru Sutāzu Nyū Sutēji: Mirai no Tomodachi)	March 17, 2012
5	Pretty Cure All Stars New Stage 2: Friends of the Heart (映画 プリキュアオールスターズ New Stage 2 こころのともだち, Eiga Purikyua Ōru Sutāzu Nyū Sutēji Tsū: Kokoro no Tomodachi)	March 16, 2013
6	Pretty Cure All Stars New Stage 3: Eternal Friends (映画 プリキュアオールスターズ New Stage 3 永遠のともだち, Eiga Purikyua Ōru Sutāzu Nyū Sutēji Surī: Eien no Tomodachi)	March 15, 2014
7	Pretty Cure All Stars: Spring Carnival (映画 プリキュアオールスターズ 春のカーニバル♪, Eiga Purikyua Ōru Sutāzu Haru no Kānibaru♪)	March 14, 2015
8	Pretty Cure All Stars: Singing with Everyone♪ Miraculous Magic! (映画 プリキュアオールスターズ みんなで歌う♪奇跡の魔法!, Eiga Purikyua Ōru Sutāzu Minna de Utau♪ Kiseki no Mahō!)	March 19, 2016
9	Pretty Cure Dream Stars! (映画プリキュアドリームスターズ！, Eiga Purikyua Dorīmu Sutāzu!)	March 18, 2017
10	Pretty Cure Super Stars! (映画 プリキュアスーパースターズ！, Eiga Purikyua Sūpā Sutāzu!)	March 17, 2018
11	Hug! Pretty Cure Futari wa Pretty Cure: All Stars Memories (映画 HUGっと!プリキュア♡ふたりはプリキュア オールスターズメモリーズ, Eiga Hagutto! Purikyua ♡ Futari wa Purikyua Ōru Sutāzu Memorīzu)	October 27, 2018
12	Pretty Cure Miracle Universe (映画 プリキュアミラクルユニバース, Eiga Purikyua Mirakuru Yunibāsu)	March 16, 2019
13	Pretty Cure Miracle Leap: A Strange Day With Everyone (映画プリキュアミラクルリープ みんなとの不思議な1日, Eiga Purikyua Mirakuru Rīpu Minna to no Fushigi na Ichinichi)	October 31, 2020
14	Pretty Cure All Stars F (映画プリキュアオールスターズ F, Eiga Purikyua Ōru Sutāzu Efu)	September 15, 2023

== Box office performance ==
Rank	Title	Year	Box office gross	Ref
1	Pretty Cure All Stars DX2: Light of Hope - Protect the Rainbow Jewel!	2010	$14,412,834	
2	Pretty Cure All Stars New Stage: Friends of the Future	2012	$12,783,557	
3	Pretty Cure All Stars DX3: Deliver the Future! The Rainbow-Colored Flower That Connects the World	2011	$12,780,834	
4	Pretty Cure All Stars DX: Everyone's Friends - the Collection of Miracles!	2009	$12,658,228	
5	HeartCatch PreCure! the Movie: Fashion Show in the Flower Capital... Really?!	2010	$11,655,596	
6	Smile Precure! the Movie: Big Mismatch in a Picture Book!	2012	$11,404,938	
7	Suite PreCure the Movie: Take it back! The Miraculous Melody that Connects Hearts	2011	$11,154,280	
8	Pretty Cure All Stars New Stage 2: Friends of the Heart	2013	$10,781,621	
9	Pretty Cure Max Heart the Movie	2005	$10,652,964	
10	HUG! Pretty Cure ♡ Pretty Cure: All Stars Memories	2018	$10,378,014	
11	Yes! PreCure 5 the Movie: Great Miraculous Adventure in the Mirror Kingdom!	2007	$10,026,319	
12	Fresh PreCure! the Movie: The Toy Kingdom has Lots of Secrets!?	2009	$10,026,319	
13	Yes! Precure 5 GoGo! the Movie: Happy Birthday in the Sweets Kingdom	2008	$9,900,990	
14	DokiDoki! PreCure the Movie: Mana's Getting Married!!? The Dress of Hope that Connects to the Future	2013	$9,749,589	
15	Pretty Cure All Stars New Stage 3: Eternal Friends	2014	$8,589,380	
16	Pretty Cure Super Stars!	2018	$7,607,042	
17	Pretty Cure Miracle Universe	2019	$7,380,000	
18	KiraKira PreCure a la Mode the Movie: Crisply! The Memory of Mille-feuille!	2017	$7,244,802	
19	Pretty Cure Max Heart the Movie 2: Friends of the Snow-Laden Sky	2005	$7,143,752	
20	Pretty Cure Dream Stars!	2017	$6,339,202	
21	Witchy PreCure! The Movie: Wonderous! Cure Mofurun!	2016	$6,160,353	
22	Pretty Cure All Stars: Singing with Everyone♪ Miraculous Magic!	2016	$5,884,516	
23	Go! Princess PreCure the Movie: Go! Go!! Gorgeous Triple Feature!!!	2015	$5,148,952	
24	HappinessCharge PreCure! the Movie: The Ballerina of the Land of Dolls	2014	$5,002,606	
25	PreCure Splash Star: Tick-Tock Crisis Hanging by a Thin Thread!	2006	$3,759,870	
Total			$228,626,558	
