= Tropical-Rouge! Pretty Cure =

Japanese anime television series

- Cover for the official Thanksgiving Event Blu-Ray, featuring the 5 main Cures in the series. From front to back: Cure Summer, Cure La Mer, Cure Coral, Cure Papaya and Cure Flamingo.

トロピカル～ジュ！プリキュア (Toropikarūju! Purikyua)
- Genre: Magical girl, Slice of Life
- Created by: Izumi Todo
- Anime television series
- Directed by: Yutaka Tsuchida
- Produced by: Akira Tanaka; Aki Murase
- Written by: Masahiro Yokotani
- Music by: Shiho Terada
- Studio: Toei Animation
- Licensed by: Crunchyroll
- Original network: ANN (ABC TV, TV Asahi)
- Original run: February 28, 2021 – January 30, 2022
- Episodes: 46
- Manga
- Written by: Izumi Todo
- Illustrated by: Futago Kamikita
- Published by: Kodansha
- Magazine: Nakayoshi
- Original run: March 2021 – February 2022
- Volumes: 2
- Anime film

Tropical-Rouge! Pretty Cure the Movie: Petit Dive! Collaboration Dance Party!
- Directed by: Takashi Otsuka
- Written by: Ryunosuke Kingetsu
- Music by: Shiho Terada
- Studio: Toei Animation
- Released: March 20, 2021
- Runtime: 5 minutes
- Anime film

Tropical-Rouge! Pretty Cure the Movie: The Snow Princess and the Miraculous Ring!
- Directed by: Junji Shimizu
- Written by: Yoshimi Narita
- Music by: Shiho Terada
- Studio: Toei Animation
- Released: October 23, 2021
- Runtime: 70 minutes
- icon

Tropical-Rouge! Pretty Cure (Japanese: トロピカル～ジュ！プリキュア, Hepburn: Toropikarūju! Purikyua) is a Japanese magical girl anime television series produced by Toei Animation. It is the eighteenth installment in the Pretty Cure franchise, and is directed by Yutaka Tsuchida and written by Masahiro Yokotani. The series premiered on ANN on February 28, 2021, succeeding Healin' Good Pretty Cure's time slot. It was succeeded by Delicious Party Pretty Cure on February 6, 2022.

The show's themes are motivation and responsibility, both of which are emphasized in reference to its protagonists creating and forming the Tropical Club, as well as one's ability to take accountability for their actions. While not directly stated, another theme is dance, the third series to feature it after Fresh Pretty Cure! and HappinessCharge PreCure!. The Cures excel at several dance styles and incorporate them into their fighting and attacks, and it contains the series' first dance-focused opening. The Cures' main motifs are mermaids, tropical and ocean themes, and cosmetics.

== Story ==
Manatsu Natsuumi is a 13-year-old first-year middle school student who moved to Aozora City from Minamino Island (南乃島) to be with her mother. Upon her arrival on the mainland, she begins her new life there and her first semester in middle school. But one day, she meets Laura, a mermaid from a mystical place called Grand Ocean, the land of mermaids. She has been searching for the legendary warriors of the Grand Ocean who can fight against the Witch of Delays, an entity from the bottom of the ocean that attacked the nation and deprived its inhabitants of their Motivation Power. Although Laura is searching for the legendary warriors because the Mermaid Queen tasked her with doing so, she is doing it out of her selfish desire to be queen one day. But when one of the witch's minions attacks Aozora City, Manatsu is blessed with the powers of the sea that allows her to become Cure Summer, one of the legendary warriors foretold in Grand Ocean's legends.

Manatsu is later joined by Sango Suzumura (Cure Coral), Minori Ichinose (Cure Papaya), Asuka Takizawa (Cure Flamingo) and Laura (Cure La Mer). They form the Tropical-Rouge Pretty Cure team to fend off against the forces of the Witch of Delays and restore the Grand Ocean to its former splendor.

== Characters ==
=== Pretty Cures ===
Manatsu Natsuumi (夏海まなつ, Natsuumi Manatsu) / Cure Summer (キュアサマー, Kyua Samā)
Voiced by: Fairouz Ai
The main protagonist of the series. An extremely energetic 13-year-old first-year middle school student who moved from Minamino Island to Aozora City. She always acts before she thinks, and in any situation, she says "I'll do what's important, right now!" Manatsu's most beautiful item is the lipstick her mother had given her. Her catchphrase is "Tropica-shine!" (トロピカってる～！, Toropikatteru~!). As Cure Summer, she is the balanced leader of the group. Her charm point is her lips, and her theme colors are white and rainbow. She introduces herself by saying "Joyful everlasting summer! Cure Summer!" (ときめく常夏！キュアサマー！, Tokimeku Tokonatsu! Kyua Samā!).
Sango Suzumura (涼村さんご, Suzumura Sango) / Cure Coral (キュアコーラル, Kyua Kōraru)
Voiced by: Yumiri Hanamori
A stylish 13-year-old first-year middle school student and Manatsu's classmate. She is very kind, loves cute things, and she can get along with everyone. Her family owns a beauty parlor called "Pretty Holic", and she is knowledgeable about makeup and cosmetics. As Cure Coral, she is the tank of the group, focusing on defensive moves. Her charm point is her cheeks, and her theme color is purple. She introduces herself by saying "Glittering jewels! Cure Coral!" (きらめく宝石！キュアコーラル！, Kirameku Hōseki! Kyua Kōraru!).
Minori Ichinose (一之瀬みのり, Ichinose Minori) / Cure Papaya (キュアパパイア, Kyua Papaia)
Voiced by: Yui Ishikawa
An intelligent 14-year-old second-year middle school student who loves to read. An honor student with the perfect grades in the school, she has a poke-face and struggles to show any emotion. However, she has a strong sense of confidence. She has loved the fairytale The Little Mermaid since she was a child, and is knowledgeable about stories about mermaids. As Cure Papaya, she specializes in special attacks. Her charm point is her eyes, and her theme color is yellow. She introduces herself by saying "Sparkling fruits! Cure Papaya!" (ひらめく果実フルーツ！キュアパパイア！, Hirameku Furūtsu! Kyua Papaia!).
Asuka Takizawa (滝沢あすか, Takizawa Asuka) / Cure Flamingo (キュアフラミンゴ, Kyua Furamingo)
Voiced by: Asami Seto
An athletic, honest, and tomboyish 15-year-old third-year middle school student with a strong sense of justice. She appears to be cool and unapproachable, but is reliable and loves to cook and play cute animal games. As Cure Flamingo, she specializes in close combat. Her charm point is her hair and her theme color is red. She introduces herself by saying "Fluttering wings! Cure Flamingo!" (はためく翼！キュアフラミンゴ！, Hatameku Tsubasa! Kyua Furamingo!).
Laura (ローラ, Rōra) / Cure La Mer (キュアラメール, Kyua Ramēru)
Voiced by: Rina Hidaka
Full name Laura Apollodoros Hyginus La Mer (ローラ・アポロドーロス・ ヒュギーヌス・ラメール, Rōra Aporodōrosu Hyugīnusu Ramēru). She is a mermaid from the Grand Ocean sent to the surface world to search for the Pretty Cure. She is very self-confident, selfish, and honest. While living in Aozora City, she takes on the name Laura La Mer (ローラ・ラメール, Rōra Ramēru), and comes to live with Manatsu and the others to support them. As Cure La Mer, she has the power to take back stolen Motivation Power using the Mermaid Aqua Pot. Her charm point is her nails and her theme color is blue. She introduces herself by saying "Shimmering ocean! Cure La Mer!" (揺らめくオーシャン！キュアラメール！, Yurameku Ōshan! Kyua Ramēru!).

=== Grand Ocean ===
Grand Ocean (グランオーシャン, Guran Ōshan) is the home of Laura and Kururun, which is ruled by the Mermaid Queen.

Kururun (くるるん)
Voiced by: Aimi Tanaka
A seal-like sea fairy from the Grand Ocean who is the Queen's current pet. Kururun always goes at their own pace, and their cry is "kururun~!" (くるるん～！).
Mermaid Queen (人魚の女王, Ningyo no joō)
Voiced by: Yūko Sasaki
The queen of the Grand Ocean, whose real name is Melusine Muses Mnemosyne (メルジーヌ・ミューゼス・ムネモシュネ, Merujīnu Myūzesu Munemoshune).

=== The Witches of Procrastination ===
The Witches of Procrastination (あとまわしの魔女たち, Ato mawashi no majo-tachi) are the main villains of the series, and are the group made up by the Witch of Delays and her marine subjects, who seek to end the motivation of the mermaids of the Great Ocean and the humans by absorbing Motivation Power from them.

==== Leaders ====
Butler (バトラー, Batorā)
Voiced by: Fuminori Komatsu
The main antagonist of the series, the Witch of Delay's seahorse-like butler who is often composed. He is later revealed to be the one who convinced the Witch to seek out the Fool's Casket (愚か者の棺, Orokamono no Hitsugi), a doomsday relic powered by Motivation Power, and use it to destroy the world. Despite his blind loyalty to the Witch, Butler refuses to accept her choice of befriending Oasis and decides to fill up the Fool's Casket personally by transforming into a Yaraneeda to take the Pretty Cures' Motivation Power. But he is defeated in the subsequent battle, sacrificing his motivation to completely power the Fool's Casket before its power was drained by La Mer. After the battle, Butler is reduced to a slothful and catatonic shell of his former self and is placed in the care of Chongire, Numeri and Elda to prevent him from trying to destroy the world again.
The Witch of Delays (あとまわしの魔女, Ato Mawashi no Majo)
Voiced by: Rei Igarashi
The secondary antagonist of the series, a gigantic sea witch with an moray eel's tail who took away the motivation of most of the Grand Ocean's inhabitants. Despite her power, she is very lazy and often passes on the task to her followers. She was once known as The Witch of Destruction (破滅の魔女, Ato Hametsu no Majo), who sought the power of the Fool's Casket to gain immortality and plunge the world into eternal laziness. However, her friendship with Oasis led her to constantly delay her battle with her, and eventually she forgot her original motivations. However, after the Witch learned her true intention was to become Oasis's friend, she disappears after accepting the latter's offer of friendship.

==== Generals ====
Minions of the Witch of Delays under Butler's leadership, each based on a marine species. They can throw orbs at objects to create Yaraneedas/Zenzen Yaraneedas/Zettai Yaraneedas/Super Zettai Yaraneedas that steal peoples' Motivation Power, leaving them unmotivated and lethargic. Each general rides a boat when they attack Aozora City.

Chongire (チョンギーレ, Chongīre)
Voiced by: Hiroshi Shirokuma
A hermit crab-like chef of the Witch of Delays who is not fond of having to steal Motivation Power, but does it out of loyalty to the Witch.
Numeri (ヌメリー, Numerī)
Voiced by: Akeno Watanabe
A sea cucumber-like doctor of the Witch of Delays, who is laid-back, sarcastic, and masochistic.
Elda (エルダ, Eruda)
Voiced by: Ayahi Takagaki
A shrimp-like maid of the Witch of Delays, who dislikes fulfilling responsibilities. She is also short-tempered and bratty.

==== Monsters ====
Yaraneeda (ヤラネーダ, Yaranēda)
Voiced by: Nozomi Mikajiri
The series' main monsters. They are summoned by the generals by throwing an orb of dark energy at objects to steal Motivation Power from humans. The Witch of Delays also created stronger variants that her generals use later in the series, the Zenzen Yaraneeda (ゼンゼンヤラネーダ, Zenzen Yaranēda), the Zettai Yaraneeda (ゼッタイヤラネーダ, Zettai Yaranēda) summoned by the dark yellow orb, and the Super Zettai Yaraneeda (超ゼッタイヤラネーダ, Chō Zettai Yaranēda) summoned by the dark red orb. Their name is derived from the word "yaranai" (やらない) which means "I don't want to do this".
Kowasunda (コワスンダー, Kowasundā)
Voiced by: Nozomi Mikajiri
Monsters summoned by Butler during the final battle, which were used by the Witch of Delays when she attacked Earth many years ago. They are summoned by a dark blue orb and have three long legs and long arms.

=== Cures' family members ===
Taiyo Natsuumi (夏海大洋, Natsuumi Taiyō)
Voiced by: Akira Harada
Manatsu's father.
Aoi Natsuumi (夏海碧, Natsuumi Aoi)
Voiced by: Ryōko Gi
Manatsu's mother. She works at Aozora City's aquarium.
Miyuki Suzumura (涼村みゆき, Suzumura Miyuki)
Voiced by: Junko Kitanishi
Sango's mother. She is the owner of the Pretty Holic beauty parlor.
Narumi Ichinose (一之瀬なるみ, Ichinose Narumi)
Voiced by: Mikako Takahashi
Minori's mother.
Hareruya Takizawa (滝沢晴瑠也, Takizawa Hareruya)
Voiced by: Masayuki Katō
Asuka's father.

=== Aozora Middle School ===
Saki Sakuragawa (桜川咲, Sakuragawa Saki)
Voiced by: Sora Tokui
Manatsu and Sango's headroom teacher.
Yuriko Shiratori (白鳥百合子, Shiratori Yuriko)
Voiced by: Ayaka Fukuhara
The school's student council president.
Kiriko Shiraishi (白石きりこ, Shiraishi Kiriko), Naomi Komachi (小町なおみ, Komachi Naomi), Yumi Kuwano (桑野ゆみ, Kuwano Yumi)
Voiced by: Serika Hiromatsu (Kiriko), Sara Matsumoto (Naomi) and Fumiko Uchimura (Yumi)
Manatsu and Sango's classmates.
Masami Kakuta (角田正美, Kakuta Masami)
Voiced by: Yuka Ōtsubo
The pampered and arrogant head of the school's disciplinary committee, who hates mermaids and denies their existence.
Izumi Komori (小森いずみ, Komori Izumī), Yukie Hayashida (林田ゆきえ, Hayashida Yukie)
Voiced by: Riho Sugiyama (Izumi) and Satomi Kobashi (Yukie)
Two members of the broadcasting club.
Eiko Mizushima (水島泳子, Mizushima Eiko)
Voiced by: Lynn
The director of the swimming club.
Shiori Nakagawa (仲川詩織, Nakagawa Shiori)
Voiced by: Satomi Amano
A student who wants to create an Astronomy Club.
Rika Ichijo (一条里香, Ichijō Rika)
Voiced by: Ruriko Noguchi
The vice president of the school's student council, who runs for student council president after Yuriko steps down.

=== Others ===
Mafune Hirabayashi (平林 まふね, Hirabayashi Mafune)
Voiced by: Hiroko Nishi
The director of Aozora City's aquarium.
Yuna Yamabe (山辺 ゆな, Yamabe Yuna)
Voiced by: Minami Takahashi
A famous actress and model, known for her sweet and gentle personality. Manatsu and the others help her gain confidence to play the role of the villain in a movie.
Haruna Takatsuki (高月 春奈, Takatsuki Haruna), Nao Tomono (友野 夏緒, Tomono Nao), Akiho Kirishima (桐島 秋穂, Kirishima Akiho) & Mifuyu Harada (原田 美冬, Harada Mifuyu)
Voiced by: Sara Matsumoto (Haruna), Fumiko Uchimura (Nao), Akeno Watanabe (Akiho), & Sora Tokui (Mifuyu)
A group of ex-students who many years before attended the same middle school as Manatsu and the others. Together, they founded a club of their own and promised to reunite once they finished their studies.
Wataru (ワタル) & Ruri (ルリ)
Voiced by: Rie Kawamura (Wataru) & Eri Yukimura (Ruri)
Two children who attend Aozora City's kindergarten. They become friends when Laura helps them discover they have a shared passion for insects.
Tomi (とみ婆, Tomī)
Voiced by: Yōko Imaizumi
An old lady from Minamino Island. As per the area's traditions, she welcomes children to her home to tell them stories and legends passed down from generation to generation. By telling them of a legend saying that a mermaid hid a treasure in a cave on the island, she helps Manatsu and the others find the Perfume Shiny Brace.
Yosuke (ようすけ), Santa (さんた) & Hina (ひな)
Voiced by: Serika Hiromatsu (Yosuke), Fumiko Uchimura (Santa) & Aimi Tanaka (Hina)
A group of children from Minamino Island and Manatsu's friends.
Satoshi Mukai (向井 慧, Mukai Satoshi)
Voiced by: Himself
A TV presenter who arrived in Aozora City to promote its middle school. After a confrontation between the Tropical Club and the student council, he decides to resolve the situation via a TV quiz.
Aunete (アウネーテ, Aunēte) / Cure Oasis (キュアオアシス, Kyua Oashisu)
Voiced by: Mai Nakahara
A legendary Cure who appears before the Pretty Cure to give them the power of the Tropical Heart Dresser, the Land Heart Kuru Ring, and the Marine Heart Kuru Ring to stop the Witch. In the past, she encountered the Witch when she was injured and nursed her back to health, and they became friends. She later fought against the Witch as Oasis as she attacked the town. She introduces herself as "To the dried-up heart! Cure Oasis!" (渇いた心に！キュアオアシス！, Kawaita Kokoro ni! Kyua Oashisu!).
Connie (コニー, Konī)
Voiced by: Hiroshi Tsuchida
A famous designer who participates in the Aozora Pretty Collection. He recruits Sango as a replacement model for the fashion show featuring his brand of clothes and accessories.
Yui Nagomi (和実ゆい, Nagomi Yui) / Cure Precious (キュアプレシャス, Kyua Pureshasu)
Voiced by: Hana Hishikawa
A pink-colored Pretty Cure from Delicious Party Pretty Cure.
Kome-Kome (コメコメ, Komekome)
Voiced by: Natsumi Takamori
The fox-like Energy Fairy of Rice from Delicious Party Pretty Cure.

=== Movie Characters ===
Sharon (シャロン)
Voiced by: Marika Matsumoto
The princess of the snow kingdom of Shantia and the main antagonist of the Tropical-Rouge! Pretty Cure the Movie: The Snow Princess and the Miraculous Ring!
Huang (ホワン, Howan)
Voiced by: Tomori Kusunoki
The spirits of the snow kingdom of Shantia.
Snow Monsters (雪の怪物, Yuki no Kaibutsu)
Voiced by: Shin'ya Takahashi
The evil monsters of the snow kingdom of Shantia.

== Development ==
On November 27, 2020, Toei trademarked the name for the new series that would be released for the 2021 season. On December 1, 2020, the series title was officially unveiled on Toei's official website. Toei later revealed the designs of the main characters as well as both the series' director and writer on December 26, 2020. The series' overall motif was a first in the franchise, and the first time its setting was tied to the main character of the series.

Producer Aki Murase spoke on the series' main theme: "What is the most important thing right now?" is a mysterious question that you can't answer well when you grow up. Maybe it's because I learned about tomorrow and learned the technique of postponing it... But how was it when you were a kid? I think that children always have the "invincible motivation power" that no one can take away from the "most important thing" in front of them. Manatsu, the main character of this work, also has "invincible motivation" to decide "the most important thing now" and take action. I want you to find more "the most important things now" through Manatsu, who has a similar feeling as those children, and to support that! I hope that Pretty Cure will lead to children's "I want to try it!", so I incorporated two longing motifs: the sea and cosmetics."

== Media ==
=== Anime ===
Tropical-Rouge! Pretty Cure began airing on all ANN stations in Japan on February 28, 2021, succeeding Healin' Good Pretty Cure in its initial time slot. Crunchyroll streamed the series with original Japanese audio and English subtitles. A week before the series premiere, Cure Summer appeared in the last episode of Healin' Good Pretty Cure as a cameo and did a baton pass with Cure Grace at the end of the episode.

=== Films ===
A short film, titled Tropical-Rouge! Pretty Cure the Movie: Petite Dive! Collaboration Dance Party! (映画 トロピカル～ジュ！プリキュア プチ とびこめ！コラボ♥ダンスパーティ！, Eiga Toropikarūju! Purikyua Puchi Tobikome! Korabo▽Dansu Pāti!), was released on March 20, 2021 alongside Healin' Good Pretty Cure the Movie: GoGo! Big Transformation! The Town of Dreams. On October 23, 2021, the film Tropical-Rouge! Pretty Cure the Movie: The Snow Princess and the Miraculous Ring! (映画 トロピカル～ジュ！プリキュア 雪のプリンセスと奇跡の指輪！, Eiga Toropikarūju! Purikyua Yuki no Purinsesu to Kiseki no Yubiwa!) was released, with the cast of HeartCatch PreCure! making an appearance.

Delicious Party♡Pretty Cure the Movie: Dreaming♡Children's Lunch! (映画デリシャスパーティ♡プリキュア 夢みる♡お子さまランチ!, Eiga Derishasu Pāti♡Purikyua Yumemiru♡Okosama Rachi!), including animated short titled My Precious Lunch (わたしだけのお子さまランチ, Watashi dake no okosama ranchi), was released in Japanese movie theaters on September 23, 2022.

=== Manga ===
The manga spinoff of the series is written and illustrated by author duo Futago Kamikita and began serialization in Kodansha's shōjo manga magazine Nakayoshi from March 2021 to February 2022.

=== Music ===
Shiho Terada (Garo) returns to compose the music from Healin' Good Pretty Cure.

==== Openings ====
Song	Artist	Episodes
"Viva! Spark! Tropical-Rouge! Precure" (Viva！Spark！トロピカル～ジュ！プリキュア)	Machico	1 – 18
"Viva! Spark! Tropical-Rouge! Precure with Tropical Club" (Viva！Spark！トロピカル～ジュ！プリキュア withトロピカる部)	Machico, Fairouz Ai, Yumiri Hanamori, Yui Ishikawa, Asami Seto & Rina Hidaka	19 – 32, 34 – 46
"Viva! Spark! Tropical-Rouge! Precure: Tropical Club version" (Viva！Spark！トロピカル～ジュ！プリキュア トロピカる部 Ver.)	Fairouz Ai, Yumiri Hanamori, Yui Ishikawa, Asami Seto & Rina Hidaka	33

==== Endings ====
Song	Artist	Episodes
"Tropica I・N・G" (トロピカ I・N・G)	Chihaya Yoshitake	1 – 3, 6 – 16
"Everybody☆Healin' Good Day!" & "Tropical I・N・G" Ending Relay (エビバディ☆ヒーリングッデイ！&トロピカ I・N・G エンディングリレー)	Kanako Miyamoto & Chihaya Yoshitake	4 – 5
"Aiming to Go My Way!!" (あこがれ Go My Way!!)	Chihaya Yoshitake & Rie Kitagawa	17 – 32, 37 – 46
"Shantia ~Land of Happiness~" (シャンティア〜しあわせのくに〜)	Fairouz Ai, Yumiri Hanamori, Yui Ishikawa, Asami Seto, Rina Hidaka, Nana Mizuki, Fumie Mizusawa, Houko Kuwashima, Aya Hisakawa	33 – 36

==== Albums ====
Title	Release date	Length	Label	Ref.
Viva! Spark! Tropical-Rouge! Precure/TropicaI·N·G (Viva! Spark! トロピカル～ジュ! プリキュア/トロピカI・N・G)	April 7, 2021	17:04	Marvelous! (MJSS-09288~9)	
Tropical-Rouge! Precure Original Soundtrack 1: Precure Tropical Sound!! (トロピカル～ジュ! プリキュア オリジナル・サウンドトラック1 プリキュア・トロピカル・サウンド!!)	June 9, 2021	1:12:05	Marvelous! (MJSA-01314)	
Tropical-Rouge! Precure Vocal Album ~Tropical! MUSIC BOX~ (トロピカル～ジュ! プリキュア ボーカルアルバム ～トロピカる! MUSIC BOX～)	July 21, 2021	56:34	Marvelous! (MJSA-01315)	
Tropical-Rouge! Precure 2nd Theme Song Single (トロピカル～ジュ! プリキュア 後期主題歌シングル)	August 11, 2021	21:02	Marvelous! (MJSS-09295~6)	
Tropical-Rouge! Precure Original Soundtrack 2: Precure Sound Victory!! (トロピカル～ジュ! プリキュア オリジナル・サウンドトラック2 プリキュア・サウンド・ビクトリー!!)	December 22, 2021	1:06:44	Marvelous! (MJSA-01321)	
Tropical-Rouge! Precure Vocal Best ~Egao no Mama de~ (トロピカル～ジュ! プリキュア ボーカルベスト ～えがおのままで～)	February 2, 2022	1:13:50	Marvelous! (MJSA-01322)	

=== Merchandise ===
Like the previous series, Bandai had released several role playing toys based on the main characters' transformation items prior to the series's airing in Japan. Alongside other merchandise, a line of cosmetics and makeup for kids named "Pretty Holic" was released on February 27, 2021.

Preceded by Healin' Good PreCure	Tropical-Rouge! Pretty Cure; 2021-2022	Succeeded by Delicious Party Pretty Cure
