= Kingetsu =

Kingetsu (written: 金月) is a Japanese surname. Notable people with the surname include:

- Mami Kingetsu (金月 真美, born 1965), Japanese voice actress and singer
- Ryunosuke Kingetsu (金月 龍之介, born 1971), Japanese screenwriter
