= Pretty Cure All Stars DX3: Deliver the Future! The Rainbow-Colored Flower That Connects the World =

2011 film by Takashi Otsuka

Pretty Cure All Stars DX3: Deliver the Future! The Rainbow-Colored Flower That Connects the World!
- Kanji: 映画プリキュアオールスターズDX3 未来にとどけ！世界をつなぐ☆虹色の花
- Revised Hepburn: Eiga Purikyua Ōru Sutāzu Dirakkusu Surī: Mirai ni Todoke! Sekai o Tsunagu Niji-Iro Hana!
- Directed by: Takashi Otsuka
- Screenplay by: Isao Murayama
- Based on: Pretty Cure by Izumi Todo
- Starring: see below
- Cinematography: Kenji Takahashi
- Edited by: Yoshihiro Aso
- Music by: Naoki Satō
- Production company: Toei Animation
- Distributed by: Toei Company, Ltd.
- Release date: March 19, 2011
- Running time: 70 minutes
- Country: Japan
- Language: Japanese
- Box office: US$10,866,071

Pretty Cure All Stars DX3: Deliver the Future! The Rainbow-Colored Flower That Connects the World (Japanese: 映画プリキュアオールスターズDX3 未来にとどけ！世界をつなぐ☆虹色の花, Hepburn: Eiga Purikyua Ōru Sutāzu Dirakkusu Surī: Mirai ni Todoke! Sekai o Tsunagu Niji-Iro no Hana!) is a 2011 Japanese animated action fantasy film based on the Pretty Cure franchise created by Izumi Todo. The film is directed by Takashi Otsuka, written by Isao Murayama, and produced by Toei Animation. The film was released in Japan on March 19, 2011.

Marking the third entry to the Pretty Cure All Stars crossover film series, as well as the final installment to the DX trilogy, the Suite PreCure team joins the previous Pretty Cure teams on protecting the Prism Flower from evil forces.

== Plot ==
The Suite PreCure team: Hibiki and Kanade, arrive at the mall, and encounter HeartCatch PreCure! team: Tsubomi, Erika, Itsuki and Yuri, who are holding a fashion show, with the other Pretty Cures present. Suddenly, millions of fairies and mascots fall from the sky. Worried, Coco and Nutts wonder if something had happened, and then the villains Dark Witch, Freezen and Frozen, Sirloin, Shadow and Mushiban, Toymajin and Count Salamander appears before them. The Cures transform, and then demand why they have reappeared. The Dark Witch responds that it is due to Lord Black Hole, which was created by the evil energies from their respective villains' defeat, (Note: Dark Zone from Futari wa Pretty Cure Max Heart, Dark Fall from Futari wa Pretty Cure Splash Star, Nightmare and Eternal from Yes! PreCure 5 GoGo!, Labyrinth from Fresh Pretty Cure!, and Desert Apostles from HeartCatch PreCure!) and Fusion and Bottom's creator. (Note: Fusion is the main antagonist from Pretty Cure All Stars DX: Everyone's Friends - the Collection of Miracles! (2009), and Bottom is the main antagonist in its sequel, Pretty Cure All Stars DX2: Light of Hope - Protect the Rainbow Jewel! (2010).) Aiming to get the Prism Flower, the villains transport the Cures through different dimensions.

Cures Black, Bloom, Dream, Peach, Blossom and Melody end up in a desert, and Cures White, Egret, Mint, Aqua, Berry, Marine and Rhythm end up in a wrecked ship surrounded by the ocean, while Shiny Luminous, Milky Rose, Cures Rouge, Lemonade, Passion, Sunshine and Moonlight on a giant board game. Despite their mishaps, they individually manage to escape and return to Earth. All their respective teams defeat the villains, while Melody and Rhythm finish Freezen and Frozen. However, Lord Black Hole arrives and attacks, causing the Cures to lose their transformation devices. While the rest despair, Coco and Nuts suggest using the Prism Flower's powers to defeat Lord Black Hole, but at the cost of the mascots not being able to see the Cures again, as the flower is the bridge between their world and Earth. All are saddened, but Hibiki encourages everyone to move forward. The Cures plead to the Prism Flower, and with its power and the Miracle Lights, they all transform into their upgraded selves, and combine their powers to attack and defeat Lord Black Hole. Despite this victory, the girls are separated from their mascots.

Weeks later, the girls are playing at the park, and suddenly, their individual mascots appears. Chypre tells them that the Tree of Hearts had bloomed a new Prism Flower, allowing them to return to their friends.

== Voice cast ==
Suite PreCure cast

- Ami Koshimizu as Hibiki Hojo/Cure Melody
- Fumiko Orikasa as Kanade Minamino/Cure Rhythm
- Kotono Mitsuishi as Hummy

HeartCatch PreCure! cast

- Nana Mizuki as Tsubomi Hanasaki/Cure Blossom
- Fumie Mizusawa as Erika Kurumi/Cure Marine
- Houko Kuwashima as Itsuki Miyoudouin/Cure Sunshine
- Aya Hisakawa as Yuri Tsukikage/Cure Moonlight
- Taeko Kawata as Chypre
- Motoko Kumai as Coffret
- Kokoro Kikuchi as Potpurri

Fresh Pretty Cure! cast

- Kanae Oki as Love Momozono/Cure Peach
- Eri Kitamura as Miki Aono/Cure Berry
- Akiko Nakagawa as Inori Yamabuki/Cure Pine
- Yuka Komatsu as Setsuna Higashi/Cure Passion
- Taiki Matsuno as Tart
- Satomi Kōrogi as Chiffon

Yes! PreCure 5 GoGo! cast

- Yūko Sanpei as Nozomi Yumehara/Cure Dream
- Junko Takeuchi as Rin Natsuki/Cure Rouge
- Mariya Ise as Urara Kasugano/Cure Lemonade
- Ai Nagano as Komachi Akimoto/Cure Mint
- Ai Maeda as Karen Minazuki/Cure Aqua
- Eri Sendai as Milk/Kurumi Mimino/Milky Rose
- Takeshi Kusao as Coco
- Miyu Irino as Natts
- Romi Park as Syrup

Futari wa Pretty Cure Splash Star cast

- Orie Kimoto as Saki Hyuuga/Cure Bloom/Cure Bright
- Atsuko Enomoto as Mai Mishou/Cure Egret/Cure Windy
- Kappei Yamaguchi as Flappy
- Miyu Matsuki as Choppy
- Yuriko Fuchizaki as Moop
- Akemi Okamura as Fuup

Futari wa Pretty Cure Max Heart cast

- Yōko Honna as Nagisa Misumi/Cure Black
- Yukana as Honoka Yukishiro/Cure White
- Rie Tanaka as Hikari Kujo/Shiny Luminous
- Tomokazu Seki as Mepple
- Akiko Yajima as Mipple
- Haruna Ikezawa as Pollun
- Asuka Tanii as Lulun

Film characters

- Koichi Yamadera as Lord Black Hole
- Masako Katsuki as Dark Witch
- Takeshi Kusao as Freezen
- Nobuyuki Hiyama as Frozen
- Show Hayami as Sirloin
- Romi Park as Shadow
- Akio Otsuka as Mushiban
- Kōzō Shioya as Toymajin
- Keiji Fujiwara as Count Salamander

== Production ==
It was announced in October 2010 that the next Pretty Cure All Stars film was in development. The majority of the key staff from previous Pretty Cure All Stars DX duology returned: Takashi Otsuka is directing at Toei Animation, Isao Murayama is providing the screenplay, and Mitsuru Aoyama is serving as a character designer and animation direction for the film, while Naoki Satō is solely composing the music for DX3.

== Release ==
The film was released in theaters in Japan on March 19, 2011. Prior to its release, the production team edited out a scene for its theatrical release, due to it being reminiscent to the earthquake and tsunami that happened weeks earlier.

== Reception ==
The film dropped from number 8 to 12 out of top 10 in the Japanese box office in its sixth week.
