= Ai Nagano =

Japanese voice actress (born 1974)

- 永野 愛
- Born: August 13, 1974 (age 52); Saitama Prefecture, Japan
- Occupation: Voice actress
- Years active: 1997–present
- Agent: Bookslope
- Height: 160 cm (5 ft 3 in)

Ai Nagano (永野 愛, Nagano Ai; born August 13, 1974) is a Japanese voice actress.

Ai is known for her role in Cutey Honey Flash as Honey Kisaragi, which was her debut role. She also voice Komachi Akimoto/Cure Mint in Yes! PreCure 5 and its sequel GoGo!, in addition to Madoka (Komachi's sister); and Yoshimi Takenochi in the inaugural Futari wa Pretty Cure. Also known as the voice of Suzie Wong from Digimon Tamers, Miki Kurosaki Digimon Savers and Lady Devimon from Digimon Adventure. She was part of Office CHK, Wit Promotion, and Drama House in the past. She is currently signed to Bookslope.

== Filmography ==
=== Anime ===
==== TV Anime ====
- Air Gear (girl in Chinese dress #9)
- Ashita no Nadja (Ms. Evans and Peter)
- Cutie Honey Flash (Honey Kisaragi/Cutie Honey)
- Digimon Adventure (Lady Devimon)
- Digimon Savers (Miki Kurokawa)
- Digimon Frontier (Nefertimon/Togemon (Ep 8))
- Digimon Tamers (Reika Ootori and Shuichon Lee)
- Futari wa Pretty Cure (Ms. Yoshimi Takenouchi)
- Futari wa Pretty Cure Max Heart (Seekun)
- Haruba-Ke no Sanninme (Kimchi)
- Hataraki Man (Hiroko's friend (ep 3), Massage parlour employee (ep 7))
- Kindaichi Shōnen no Jikenbo (nurse, Shiraishi (ep 64-67), waitress)
- Kocchi Muite Miko (Yuuko Ogawa, [+ unlisted credits])
- Mo~tto! Ojamajo Doremi (Reika Tamaki, Mary)
- Ojamajo Doremi (Reika Tamaki)
- Ojamajo Doremi Sharp (Reika Tamaki)
- Ojamajo Doremi Dokkan! (Reika Tamaki)
- Phantom Thief Jeanne (Tsugumi Segawa (Ep 30))
- Power of Hope: PreCure Full Bloom (Komachi Akimoto/Cure Mint, Madoka Akimoto)
- Solty Rei (Rita Revant)
- Ojarumaru (Akiko)
- Yes! PreCure 5 (Komachi Akimoto/Cure Mint, Madoka Akimoto)
- Yes PreCure 5 GoGo! (Komachi Akimoto/Cure Mint, Madoka Akimoto)
- Konjiki no Gash Bell!! (Hiromi, Big Boing, Cherish, Daria Anjé)

==== Anime film ====
- Cutie Honey Flash: The Movie (1997) – Honey Kisaragi/Cutie Honey
- Ojamajo Doremi Sharp: The Movie (2000) – Reika Tamaki
- Yes! PreCure 5 the Movie: Great Miraculous Adventure in the Mirror Kingdom! (2007) – Komachi Akimoto/Cure Mint
- Yes! PreCure 5 GoGo! The Movie: Happy Birthday in the Sweets Kingdom! (2008) – Komachi Akimoto/Cure Mint
- Pretty Cure All Stars DX: Everyone's Friends - the Collection of Miracles! (2009) – Komachi Akimoto/Cure Mint
- Pretty Cure All Stars DX2: Light of Hope - Protect the Rainbow Jewel! (2010) – Komachi Akimoto/Cure Mint
- Pretty Cure All Stars DX3: Deliver the Future! The Rainbow-Colored Flower That Connects the World (2011) – Komachi Akimoto/Cure Mint
- Pretty Cure All Stars New Stage 3: Eternal Friends (2014) – Komachi Akimoto/Cure Mint
- Hug! Pretty Cure Futari wa Pretty Cure: All Stars Memories (2018) – Komachi Akimoto/Cure Mint
- Looking for Magical Doremi (2020) – Sora's classmate
- Healin' Good Pretty Cure the Movie: GoGo! Big Transformation! The Town of Dreams (2021) – Komachi Akimoto/Cure Mint

=== Non-anime ===
- True Love Story 2 (Akane Morishita)

=== Video games ===
- Yes! Precure 5 (Komachi Akimoto/Cure Mint)

=== CD ===
- Baccano! (Rachel)
- Digimon Tamers (Lopmon and Shuichon Lee)
