= Tropical-Rouge! Pretty Cure the Movie: The Snow Princess and the Miraculous Ring! =

2021 film by Junji Shimizu

- Theatrical release poster
- Kanji: 映画 トロピカル～ジュ！プリキュア 雪のプリンセスと奇跡の指輪！
- Revised Hepburn: Eiga Toropikarūju! Purikyua Yuki no Purinsesu to Kiseki no Yubiwa!
- Directed by: Junji Shimizu
- Screenplay by: Yoshimi Narita
- Based on: Pretty Cure by Izumi Todo
- Starring: Fairouz Ai; Yumiri Hanamori; Yui Ishikawa; Asami Seto; Rina Hidaka; Aimi Tanaka; Nana Mizuki; Fumie Mizusawa; Houko Kuwashima; Aya Hisakawa; Taeko Kawata; Motoko Kumai; Kokoro Kikuchi; Marika Matsumoto
- Cinematography: Kenji Takahashi
- Edited by: Yoshihiro Aso
- Music by: Shiho Terada
- Production company: Toei Animation
- Distributed by: Toei Company, Ltd.
- Release date: October 23, 2021
- Running time: 70 minutes
- Country: Japan
- Language: Japanese

Tropical-Rouge! Pretty Cure the Movie: The Snow Princess and the Miraculous Ring! (Japanese: 映画 トロピカル～ジュ！プリキュア 雪のプリンセスと奇跡の指輪！, Hepburn: Eiga Toropikarūju! Purikyua Yuki no Purinsesu to Kiseki no Yubiwa!) is a 2021 Japanese animated action fantasy film based on the Pretty Cure franchise created by Izumi Todo, and the second film for the Tropical-Rouge! Pretty Cure series, following Petite Dive! Collaboration Dance Party! short film (2021). The film is directed by Junji Shimizu, written by Yoshimi Narita, and produced by Toei Animation. The film was released in Japan on October 23, 2021.

Featuring the Pretty Cure teams from HeartCatch PreCure!, Manatsu and the others explore the Snow Kingdom on Shantia, summoned by its princess, Sharon.

== Plot ==
After the Tropical-Rouge! Pretty Cure team defeats a Yaraneeda summoned by Numeri, Sango tells everyone at the beach about a singing event at the mall, which interests Laura. Soon after, Sharon uses Howan to invite Manatsu and the others to the Snow Kingdom of Shantia. After arriving to the kingdom via train, Sharon welcomes the girls and tells them to have fun before the coronation. During a snowball fight, they encounter the HeartCatch PreCure team: Tsubomi, Erika, Itsuki and Yuri. After spending time together and having brief tension with Erika, Laura meets Sharon in the courtyard, who gives her the Snow Heart Kuru Ring. During the coronation, Sharon freezes the performers as they are trying to leave the country and orders the snow monsters to attack. The Tropical-Rouge! and HeartCatch teams transform and defeat the monsters.

Sharon reveals to them that Shantia was destroyed 13,000 years ago during a meteor strike, and that she was resurrected by the meteorite's power, which she plans to use to bring Shantia back to life. After Blossom and Marine's attack fails because La Mer protects Sharon, she locks the HeartCatch team in the basement. After Coral, Papaya and Flamingo rescue the team from the basement, La Mer confronts Sharon, who suggests she and La Mer combine powers to save Shantia, but she refuses. Unable to control her emotions, Sharon creates strong snow monster to defeat the Cures. However, using the power of the Snow Heart Kuru Ring and powers from the HeartCatch team, the Tropical-Rouge! team gains the Snow Crystal Tropical Style, and purifies Sharon with the "Heart Shining Orchestra" attack.

With her strength dwindling, Sharon is moved by La Mer Singing Shantia’s song. La Mer tells Sharon that she'll sing the kingdom's song for eternity, while Blossom tells her that the kingdom's flower, snowdrop, is still blooming in the present. With the stone gone, Sharon tells Laura that she's glad they met before she disappears. Back home on Aozora City, Laura and the others sing Shantia's song during the singing event at the mall, with Tsubomi and the others cheering them on.

== Voice cast ==
- Fairouz Ai as Manatsu Natsuumi/Cure Summer
- Yumiri Hanamori as Sango Suzumura/Cure Coral
- Yui Ishikawa as Minori Ichinose/Cure Papaya
- Asami Seto as Asuka Takizawa/Cure Flamingo
- Rina Hidaka as Laura/Cure La Mer
- Aimi Tanaka as Kururun
- Nana Mizuki as Tsubomi Hanasaki/Cure Blossom
- Fumie Mizusawa as Erika Kurumi/Cure Marine
- Houko Kuwashima as Itsuki Myoudouin/Cure Sunshine
- Aya Hisakawa as Yuri Tsukikage/Cure Moonlight
- Taeko Kawata as Chypre
- Motoko Kumai as Coffret
- Kokoro Kikuchi as Potpourri
- Marika Matsumoto as Sharon, the Princess of the Snow Kingdom of Shantia
- Tomori Kusunoki as Huang, the spirits of the Snow Kingdom of Shantia
- Shin'ya Takahashi as Snow Monsters
- Akeno Watanabe as Numeri

== Production ==
In July 2021, it was announced that Tropical-Rouge! Pretty Cure series will receive a feature film, following Tropical-Rouge! Pretty Cure the Movie: Petite Dive! Collaboration Dance Party! short film that was released alongside Healin' Good Pretty Cure the Movie: GoGo! Big Transformation! The Town of Dreams earlier that year. Pretty Cure episode director Junji Shimizu is directing the film, with Yoshimi Narita, whom wrote the Yes! PreCure 5 GoGo! series and HappinessCharge PreCure! the Movie: The Ballerina of the Land of Dolls film, providing the screenplay, and Pretty Cure episode animation director Ken Ueno is providing the character design and animation direction for the film. The film will feature the main Pretty Cure teams from HeartCatch PreCure series, making the third Pretty Cure standalone film to be a crossover following Kirakira Pretty Cure a la Mode the Movie: Crisply! The Memory of the Mille-feuille! in 2017, and Healin' Good Pretty Cure the Movie: GoGo! Big Transformation! The Town of Dreams in 2021. The voice actresses from HeartCatch PreCure! individually expressed their gratitude for their appearance in the film. The same day, Japanese actress Marika Matsumoto was cast as Sharon.

The theme song for the film is "Shantia ~Shiawase no kuni~" (シャンティア〜しあわせのくに〜 エンディング; lit. "Shantia ~ The Land of Happiness~"), sung by the voice actresses of Tropical-Rouge! Pretty Cure and HeartCatch PreCure!.

== Release ==
The film was released in theaters in Japan on October 23, 2021.

== Reception ==
The film debuted at number 1 out of top 10 in the Japanese box office in its opening weekend, and later dropped to number 4 the following week.
