= Izumi Todo =

Pseudonym for the Toei Animation production staff

Izumi Todo (東堂いづみ, Tōdō Izumi), credited with creating series like Ojamajo Doremi and Pretty Cure, is a collective pen name used by Toei Animation television producers when contributing to their various anime series. Pseudonyms used in a similar manner include Hajime Yatate from Sunrise and Saburo Yatsude for Toei Company's anime and tokusatsu television productions. The use of the pen name began with Ojamajo Doremi.

The name comes from "Tōei Dōga (the former name of Toei Animation) and Ōizumi Studio" (written in Japanese as 東映動画大泉スタジオ).

== Credited series ==
=== Television ===
- Ojamajo Doremi (1999–2004, 2019–2020)
  - Ojamajo Doremi (1999–2000)
  - Ojamajo Doremi ♯ (2000–2001)
  - Mōtto! Ojamajo Doremi (2001–2002)
  - Ojamajo Doremi Dokkān! (2002–2003)
  - Ojamajo Doremi Na-i-sho (2004)
  - Ojamajo Doremi: Owarai Gekijō (2019–2020)
- Shinzo (2000)
- Pipo Papo Patrol-kun (2000–2001)
- Ashita no Nadja (2003–2004)
- Pretty Cure (2004–present)
  - Futari wa Pretty Cure (2004–2005)
  - Futari wa Pretty Cure Max Heart (2005–2006)
  - Futari wa Pretty Cure Splash★Star (2006–2007)
  - Yes! PreCure 5 (2007–2008)
  - Yes! PreCure 5 GoGo! (2008–2009)
  - Fresh Pretty Cure! (2009–2010)
  - HeartCatch PreCure! (2010–2011)
  - Suite PreCure (2011–2012)
  - Smile PreCure! (2012–2013)
  - DokiDoki! PreCure (2013–2014)
  - HappinessCharge PreCure! (2014–2015)
  - Go! Princess Pretty Cure (2015–2016)
  - Witchy Pretty Cure! (2016–2017)
  - Kirakira Pretty Cure a la Mode (2017–2018)
  - Hug! Pretty Cure (2018–2019)
  - Star Twinkle PreCure (2019–2020)
  - Healin' Good Pretty Cure (2020–2021)
  - Tropical-Rouge! Pretty Cure (2021–2022)
  - Delicious Party Pretty Cure (2022–2023)
  - Soaring Sky! Pretty Cure (2023–2024)
  - Power of Hope: PreCure Full Bloom (2023)
  - Wonderful Pretty Cure! (2024–2025)
  - Witchy Pretty Cure!! Mirai Days (2025)
  - You and Idol Pretty Cure (2025–2026)
  - Star Detective Precure! (2026–Present)
- Gin'iro no Olynssis (2006)
- Hatara Kizzu Maihamu Gumi (2007–2008)
- Marie & Gali (2009–2010)
- Marie & Gali ver. 2.0 (2010–2011)
- Kyousougiga (2011–2013): head writer
  - ONA (2011–2012)
  - TV series (2013)
- Marvel Disk Wars: The Avengers (2015): script

=== Films ===
- Ojamajo Doremi (2000–2001, 2020)
  - Ojamajo Doremi #: Pop and the Queen's Cursed Rose (2000)
  - Mōtto! Ojamajo Doremi: The Secret of the Frog Stone (2001)
  - Looking for Magical Doremi (2020)
- Pretty Cure (2005–present)
  - Futari wa Pretty Cure Max Heart the Movie (2005)
  - Futari wa Pretty Cure Max Heart the Movie 2: Friends of the Snow-Laden Sky (2005)
  - Futari wa Pretty Cure Splash Star: Tick-Tock Crisis Hanging by a Thin Thread! (2006)
  - Yes! PreCure 5 the Movie: Great Miraculous Adventure in the Mirror Kingdom! (2007)
  - Yes! PreCure 5 GoGo! the Movie: Happy Birthday in the Sweets Kingdom (2008)
  - Fresh Pretty Cure! the Movie: The Toy Kingdom has Lots of Secrets!? (2009)
  - HeartCatch PreCure! the Movie: Fashion Show in the Flower Capital...Really?! (2010)
  - Suite PreCure the Movie: Take It Back! The Miraculous Melody That Connects Hearts (2011)
  - Smile PreCure! the Movie: Big Mismatch in a Picture Book! (2012)
  - DokiDoki! PreCure the Movie: Mana's Getting Married!!? The Dress of Hope That Connects to the Future (2013)
  - HappinessCharge PreCure! the Movie: The Ballerina of the Land of Dolls (2014)
  - Go! Princess Pretty Cure the Movie: Go! Go!! Gorgeous Triple Feature!!! (2015)
  - Witchy Pretty Cure! The Movie: Wonderous! Cure Mofurun! (2016)
  - Kirakira Pretty Cure a la Mode the Movie: Crisply! The Memory of Mille-feuille! (2017)
  - Star Twinkle Pretty Cure the Movie: These Feeling Within the Song of Stars (2019)
  - Healin' Good Pretty Cure the Movie: GoGo! Big Transformation! The Town of Dreams (2021)
  - Tropical-Rouge! Pretty Cure the Movie: Petit Dive! Collaboration Dance Party! (2021)
  - Tropical-Rouge! Pretty Cure the Movie: The Snow Princess and the Miraculous Ring! (2021)
  - Delicious Party Pretty Cure the Movie: Dreaming♡Children's Lunch! (2022)
  - Wonderful Pretty Cure! The Movie: A Grand Adventure in a Thrilling Game World! (2024)
  - You and Idol Pretty Cure the Movie: For You! Our Kirakilala Concert! (2025)
  - Star Detective Precure! The Movie: The Mysterious Garden and a Secret Pair (2026)
- Pretty Cure All Stars (2009–2020, 2023)
  - Pretty Cure All Stars DX: Everyone's Friends - the Collection of Miracles! (2009)
  - Pretty Cure All Stars DX2: Light of Hope - Protect the Rainbow Jewel! (2010)
  - Pretty Cure All Stars DX3: Deliver the Future! The Rainbow-Colored Flower That Connects the World (2011)
  - Pretty Cure All Stars New Stage: Friends of the Future (2012)
  - Pretty Cure All Stars New Stage 2: Friends of the Heart (2013)
  - Pretty Cure All Stars New Stage 3: Eternal Friends (2014)
  - Pretty Cure All Stars: Spring Carnival (2015)
  - Pretty Cure All Stars: Singing with Everyone Miraculous Magic! (2016)
  - Pretty Cure Dream Stars! (2017)
  - Pretty Cure Super Stars! (2018)
  - Hug! Pretty Cure Futari wa Pretty Cure: All Stars Memories (2018)
  - Pretty Cure Miracle Universe (2019)
  - Pretty Cure Miracle Leap: A Wonderful Day with Everyone (2020)
  - Pretty Cure All Stars F (2023)
- Pop in Q (2016)

=== OVA ===
- Ojamajo Doremi Na-i-sho (2004)

=== Manga ===
- Shinzo (2000)
- Ojamajo Doremi (2000–2001): writer
  - Ojamajo Doremi (2000)
  - Mōtto! Ojamajo Doremi (2001)
- Ashita no Nadja (2003): writer
- Pretty Cure (2004–present): writer
  - Futari wa Pretty Cure (2004–2005)
  - Futari wa Pretty Cure Max Heart (2005–2006)
  - Futari wa Pretty Cure Max Heart the Movie (2005)
  - Futari wa Pretty Cure Max Heart the Movie 2: Friends of the Snow-Laden Sky (2005)
  - Futari wa Pretty Cure Splash★Star (2006–2007)
  - Futari wa Pretty Cure Splash Star: Tick-Tock Crisis Hanging by a Thin Thread! (2006)
  - Yes! PreCure 5 (2007–2008)
  - Yes! PreCure 5 GoGo! (2008–2009)
  - Fresh Pretty Cure! (2009–2010)
  - HeartCatch PreCure! (2010–2011)
  - Suite PreCure (2011–2012)
  - Smile PreCure! (2012–2013)
  - Dokidoki! PreCure (2013–2014)
  - HappinessCharge PreCure! (2014–2015)
  - Go! Princess Pretty Cure (2015–2016)
  - Witchy Pretty Cure! (2016–2017)
  - Kirakira Pretty Cure a la Mode (2017–2018)
  - Hug! Pretty Cure (2018)
  - Star Twinkle PreCure (2019)
  - Healin' Good Pretty Cure (2020–2021)
  - Tropical-Rouge! Pretty Cure (2021–2022)
  - Delicious Party Pretty Cure (2022–2023)
  - Soaring Sky! Pretty Cure (2023–present)
- Kyousougiga (2011–2014): writer
- Sutapura! NG - Star Plus One + Next Generation (2013–2014)
- Majin Bone (2014)
- Pop in Q Reverse (2016): writer

== See also ==
- Hajime Yatate
- Saburo Yatsude
