= Healin' Good Pretty Cure the Movie: GoGo! Big Transformation! The Town of Dreams =

2021 film by Ryota Nakamura

- Cover of the DVD release by Marvelous!
- Kanji: 映画 ヒーリングっど♡プリキュア ゆめのまちでキュン！っとGoGo！大変身！！
- Revised Hepburn: Eiga Hīrin Guddo Purikyua Yume no Machi de Kyun! Tto GōGō! Daihenshin!!
- Directed by: Ryōta Nakamura
- Screenplay by: Ryunosuke Kingetsu
- Based on: Pretty Cure by Izumi Todo
- Starring: Aoi Yūki; Natsu Yorita; Hiyori Kono; Suzuko Mimori; Ai Kakuma; Hana Takeda; Aki Kanada; Haruka Shiraishi; Yūko Sanpei; Junko Takeuchi; Mariya Ise; Ai Nagano; Ai Maeda; Eri Sendai; Takeshi Kusao; Miyu Irino
- Cinematography: Kenji Takahashi
- Music by: Shiho Terada
- Production company: Toei Animation
- Distributed by: Toei Company, Ltd.
- Release date: March 20, 2021
- Running time: 70 minutes
- Country: Japan
- Language: Japanese

Healin' Good Pretty Cure the Movie: GoGo! Big Transformation! The Town of Dreams (Japanese: 映画 ヒーリングっど♡プリキュア ゆめのまちでキュン！っとGoGo！大変身！！, Hepburn: Eiga Hīrin Guddo Purikyua Yume no Machi de Kyun! Tto GōGō! Daihenshin!!) is a 2021 Japanese animated action fantasy film based on the Pretty Cure franchise created by Izumi Todo, and its seventeenth series, Healin' Good Pretty Cure. The film is directed by Ryōta Nakamura, written by Ryunosuke Kingetsu, and produced by Toei Animation. The film was released in Japan on March 20, 2021, as a double feature alongside a 5-minute short film, Tropical-Rouge! Pretty Cure the Movie: Petite Dive! Collaboration Dance Party! (映画 トロピカル～ジュ！プリキュア プチ とびこめ！コラボ♥ダンスパーティ！, Eiga Toropikarūju! Purikyua Puchi Tobikome! Korabo▽Dansu Pāti!).

Featuring the Pretty Cure team from Yes! PreCure 5 GoGo!, Nodoka and the others explore Tokyo using the Dream Pendant, while encountering a monster named Ego Ego.

== Plot ==
Nodoka, Chiyu, Hinata and Asumi arrive to Tokyo and experience virtual dream-like reality using the Dream Pendant via the Virtual Dream system. There, Nodoka encounters a girl named Kaguya, a popular model of Virtual Dreams. Later that night, at a special stage in the middle of the city, Kaguya is attacked by a fox-like monster named Ego Ego, an artificial life form that Sarena created during her research and development of Virtual Dreams. Nodoka and the others transform and fight, but Ego Ego multiplies. Then, the Yes! PreCure 5 GoGo! team: Cures Dream, Rouge, Lemonade, Mint, Aqua and Milky Rose appear and assist the Healin' Good team. After Ego Ego is defeated, he escapes, and the Yes! 5 team continues their pursuit, promising Nodoka and the others they will meet the next morning.

The next morning, Kaguya invites Nodoka and the others to a stadium, and each uses their Dream Pendants individually. Later, Nodoka and the others plan Kaguya's birthday party, while Kaguya is shocked to learn that her mother, Sarena has captured the Yes! 5 team. Sarena reveals that she plans to use the team's Dream Buds to make the Miracle Flower bloom, but still in disbelief, Kaguya runs away. Nodoka and the others are summoned by Kaguya via the Dream Whale, and learn that Kaguya is a spirit of the Miracle Flower. Soon after, Ego Ego returns and steals the townspeople's Dream Buds, including Nodoka's mother. Determined to save the people and Kaguya, the Cures transform with their partners, gaining the Partner Forms, and chase after Ego Ego.

While fighting Ego Ego, Grace and the others learn that Kaguya has little time left to live because her power was used to research Virtual Dreams, and that Sarena is attempting to use the Miracle Flower to save her. Ego Ego reveals that he wants the Miracle Flower for himself, but Grace and the others, including the re-awakened Yes! 5 team, briefly stop him. In his last effort, Ego Ego absorbs Kaguya and gains a humanoid form to attack both teams. With Grace and Dream's Dream Buds shining, the other Cures send them their powers, transforming both Cures into Dream Cure Grace, who defeat Ego Ego with "Healin' Good Dream". Kaguya is slowly fading away, but Grace asks the city to lend her the power of their Virtual Dreams. The city lights up, and with Sarena's emotions, Grace transforms into Kaguya Grace and purifies Kaguya.

Kaguya wakes up, now as a human girl surrounded by flowers, and Sarena wishes her daughter a happy birthday.

== Voice cast ==
- Aoi Yūki as Nodoka Hanadera/Cure Grace
- Natsu Yorita as Chiyu Sawaizumi/Cure Fontaine
- Hiyori Kono as Hinata Hiramitsu/Cure Sparkle
- Suzuko Mimori as Asumi Fuurin/Cure Earth
- Ai Kakuma as Rabirin
- Hana Takeda as Pegitan
- Aki Kanada as Nyatoran
- Haruka Shiraishi as Rate
- Seiran Kobayashi as Kaguya
- Masako Katsuki as Sarena Gashuuin
- Wataru Takagi as Ego Ego
- Kazusa Murai as Yasuko Hanadera
- Yūko Sanpei as Nozomi Yumehara/Cure Dream
- Junko Takeuchi as Rin Natsuki/Cure Rouge
- Mariya Ise as Urara Kasugano/Cure Lemonade
- Ai Nagano as Komachi Akimoto/Cure Mint
- Ai Maeda as Karen Minazuki/Cure Aqua
- Eri Sendai as Milk/Kurumi Mimino/Milky Rose
- Takeshi Kusao as Coco
- Miyu Irino as Natsu

Nicole Fujita, Meru Nukumi, and Hina Kagei made cameo appearances as themselves.

== Production ==
In October 2020, the day Pretty Cure Miracle Leap: A Wonderful Day with Everyone premiered, it was announced that a film based on Healin' Good Pretty Cure was in the works and would feature the Pretty Cure team from Yes! PreCure 5 GoGo!. On December of that year, it was announced that Ryōta Nakamura will direct the film, with Ryunosuke Kingetsu providing the screenplay, and Pretty Cure episode animation director Katsumi Tamegai will provide the character designs and animation direction for the film. The voice actresses from Yes! PreCure 5 GoGo! individually expressed their gratitude for their appearance in the film. In February 2021, it was announced that actress Seiran Kobayashi and voice actress Masako Katsuki was cast as Kaguya and Sarena Gashuuin respectively. The film also featured cameo appearances from Nicole Fujita, Meru Nukumi and Hina Kagei.

== Release ==
The film was released in theaters in Japan on March 20, 2021, as a double feature with a 5-minute short film, Tropical-Rouge! Pretty Cure the Movie: Petite Dive! Collaboration Dance Party!.

== Reception ==
=== Box office ===
The film debuted at number 4 out of top 10 in the Japanese box office in its opening weekend.

== Tropical-Rouge! Pretty Cure the Movie: Petite Dive! Collaboration Dance Party! ==
Tropical-Rouge! Pretty Cure the Movie: Petit Dive! Collaboration Dance Party!
- Kanji: 映画 トロピカル～ジュ！プリキュア プチ とびこめ！コラボ♥ダンスパーティ！
- Revised Hepburn: Eiga Toropikarūju! Purikyua Puchi Tobikome!! Korabo Dansu Patī!
- Directed by: Takashi Otsuka
- Screenplay by: Ryunosuke Kingetsu
- Based on: Pretty Cure by Izumi Todo
- Cinematography: Shinichi Igarashi
- Edited by: Yoshihiro Aso
- Music by: Shiho Terada
- Production company: Toei Animation
- Distributed by: Toei Company, Ltd.
- Release date: March 20, 2021
- Running time: 5 minutes
- Country: Japan
- Language: Japanese

Tropical-Rouge! Pretty Cure the Movie: Petite Dive! Collaboration Dance Party! (映画 トロピカル～ジュ！プリキュア プチ とびこめ！コラボ♥ダンスパーティ！, Eiga Toropikarūju! Purikyua Puchi Tobikome! Korabo Dansu Patī!) is a 2021 Japanese animated action fantasy short film based on the Pretty Cure franchise created by Izumi Todo, and its eighteenth series, Tropical-Rouge! Pretty Cure. The short is directed by Takashi Otsuka, written by Ryunosuke Kingetsu, and produced by Toei Animation.

The short marks the first film for the Tropical-Rouge! Pretty Cure series, and was followed by Tropical-Rouge! Pretty Cure the Movie: The Snow Princess and the Miraculous Ring! (2021).

=== Plot ===
Laura presents the Tropical-Rouge! Pretty Cure team with a letter she received from Rabirin, which is an invitation to a dance party. The Cures realize that the party starts in three minutes, and quickly board the plane, which turns out to be a Yaraneeda that morphs into a pirate ship, while the Cures fall from the sky. They transform and fight off the Yareneeda, then arrive at the "Dance Party Island", but are exhausted. Laura points out that the Healin' Good Pretty Cure team is waiting for them at the entrance.

=== Voice cast ===
- Fairouz Ai as Manatsu Natsuumi/Cure Summer
- Yumiri Hanamori as Sango Suzumura/Cure Coral
- Yui Ishikawa as Minori Ichinose/Cure Papaya
- Asami Seto as Asuka Takizawa/Cure Flamingo
- Rina Hidaka as Laura
- Aimi Tanaka as Kururun
