= Hiyori Kono =

Japanese voice actress

- 河野 ひより
- Born: Yamanashi Prefecture, Japan
- Occupation: Voice actress

Hiyori Kono (河野 ひより, Kōno Hiyori) is a Japanese voice actress. She was previously affiliated with the agency With Line, but is currently represented by First Wind Production. She is also a member of the idol girl group Tearlove, formed by Marine Entertainment.

== Biography ==
Her synchronization is Maiko Irie and Maria Sashide.

== Filmography ==
=== Anime ===
2017

- Anonymous Noise – Audience
- Love Tyrant – Land crew, girls

2018

- Anima Yell! – Kon Akitsune
- Death March to the Parallel World Rhapsody – Pochi
- Grand Blue – Game voice B
- Harukana Receive – Student 1
- Märchen Mädchen – Lucy Burton
- Muhyo & Roji's Bureau of Supernatural Investigation – Student
- Planet With – Younger sister, reporter 2

2019

- Aikatsu Friends! – Junior high school fan
- Are You Lost? – Asuka Suzumori
- Astra Lost in Space – Schoolgirl
- Chidori RSC – Ako Tōma
- Didn't I Say to Make My Abilities Average in the Next Life?! – Renny
- Hakata Mentai! Pirikarako-chan – Pirikarako-chan
- Hitori Bocchi no Marumaru Seikatsu – Notsugi Futago
- Kedama no Gonjirō – Second girl
- O Maidens in Your Savage Season – Kazusa Onodera
- The Promised Neverland – Phil

2020

- Healin' Good PreCure – Hinata Hiramitsu/Cure Sparkle

2021

- That Time I Got Reincarnated as a Slime – Kirara Mizutani
- Fena: Pirate Princess – Hannah Snell

2022

- In the Heart of Kunoichi Tsubaki – Hosenka
- Don't Hurt Me, My Healer! – Ellie

2024

- The Idolmaster Shiny Colors – Kaho Komiya
- A Journey Through Another World: Raising Kids While Adventuring - Feat
- Magilumiere Magical Girls Inc. – Hana Ginji

2026

- Even the Student Council Has Its Holes! – Tan Otori

2027

- Matsurika Kanriden – Lian Lo

=== Video games ===
2018

- The Idolmaster Shiny Colors – Kaho Komiya

2020

- Yoru, Tomosu – Maya Aoyagi
- 100% Orange Juice! - Chris

2021

- Loopers – Hilda
- The Caligula Effect 2 – Niko Komamura
- Counter:Side – Gabriel Jun the Vicious Breaker, Liv Allen

2024

- Umamusume: Pretty Derby – No Reason

=== Dubbing ===
2023

- The Last Summoner – Stan
