= Ryunosuke Kingetsu =

Japanese screenwriter

Ryunosuke Kingetsu (金月 龍之介, Kingetsu Ryūnosuke; born September 29, 1971) is a Japanese screenwriter of scenarios for several anime, drama CDs, video games, as well as novels.

== Filmography ==
- series head writer denoted in bold

=== TV series ===
- Piano: The Melody of a Young Girl’s Heart (2002–2003)
- Weiß Kreuz Glühen (2003)
- Dokkoida?! (2003)
- **Ninja Nonsense** (2004)
- **Futakoi Alternative** (2005)
- Coyote Ragtime Show (2006)
- **Kage Kara Mamoru!** (2006)
- **Gakuen Utopia Manabi Straight!** (2007)
- Koi suru Tenshi Angelique~Kagayaki no Ashita~ (2007)
- Shugo Chara! (2007–2008)
- Noramimi (2008)
- Queen’s Blade: The Exiled Virgin (2009)
- Ikki Tousen: Xtreme Xecutor (2010)
- **Aesthetica of a Rogue Hero** (2012)
- Bladedance of Elementalers (2014)
- **Ulysses: Jeanne d'Arc and the Alchemist Knight** (2018)
- Märchen Mädchen (2018–2019)
- GeGeGe no Kitarō 6th series (2018–2020)
- Healin' Good Pretty Cure (2020–2021)
- World Trigger (2021)
- **Police in a Pod** (2022)
- **Soaring Sky! Pretty Cure** (2023)
- **The Gene of AI** (2023)
- **Trillion Game** (2024)

=== OVAs ===
- Tales of Phantasia: The Animation (2004–2006)
- Gakuen Utopia Manabi Straight!: It’s Summer! It’s Manabi! It’s a Training Camp! (2007)
- Tales of Symphonia: The Animation
  - Sylvarant Episode (2007)
  - Tethe'alla Episode (2010–2011)
  - The United World Episode (2011–2012)
- Queen’s Blade: Vanquished Queens (2013)
- Queen’s Blade Unlimited (2018, 2020)

=== Films ===
- Healin' Good Pretty Cure the Movie: GoGo! Big Transformation! The Town of Dreams (2021)
- Tropical-Rouge! Pretty Cure the Movie: Petite Dive! Collaboration Dance Party! (2021)

== Drama CDs ==
- Tales of Series
  - Tales of Phantasia
    - Tales of Phantasia (3 CDs)
    - Anthology (2 CDs)
    - Narikiri Dungeon (2 CDs)
    - Panic World (1 CD)
  - Tales of Eternia
  - Tales of Destiny
    - Proust Forgotten Chronicle (1 CD)
  - Tales of Destiny 2 (5 CDs)
  - Tales of Symphonia
    - A LONG TIME AGO (3 CDs)
    - Rodeo Ride Tour (2 CDs)
  - Tales of Rebirth (4 CDs)
  - Tales of the Abyss
  - Tales of Fandom
    - "(Chotto) Shiawase Nikki" (1 CD)
    - Tales Ring Archive (2 CDs)
