= Fumie Mizusawa =

Japanese voice actress and novelist

- 水沢 史絵
- Born: 9 January 1980 (age 46); Utsunomiya, Tochigi Prefecture, Japan
- Occupations: Actress; voice actress; novelist
- Years active: 2000–present
- Agent: Sigma Seven (March 2024 - present)
- Notable work: HeartCatch PreCure! as Erika Kurumi/Cure Marine; Romeo x Juliet as Juliet
- Height: 160 cm (5 ft 3 in)
- Spouse: Unknown (m. 2011)
- Website: fumie-mizusawa.themedia.jp

Fumie Mizusawa (水沢 史絵, Mizusawa Fumie; born 9 January 1980) is a Japanese actress, voice actress and novelist. She is represented by Sigma Seven (2005 - July 2019; March 2024 - present) and was formerly represented by Aoni Production (December 2019 - November 2023).

== Personal life ==
Mizusawa announced that she has registered her marriage with her non-celebrity partner on April 16, 2011.

== Filmography ==
=== Anime television ===
- Divergence Eve (2003), Kiri Mariarēte
- Otogizōshi (2004), Minamoto no Hikaru
- Misaki Chronicles ~Divergence Eve~ (2004), Kiri Mariarēte
- Major 1st Season (2004), Majima
- Eureka 7 (2005), Gidget, Linck
- Futari wa Pretty Cure: Max Heart (2005), Miu Kagayama, Eternalun
- Witchblade (2006), Nanako
- Otogi-Jūshi Akazukin (2006), Mahō Gakkō Seito
- Galaxy Angel Rune (2006), Satō-san, Tanaka-san, Suzuki-san
- Coyote Ragtime Show (2006), Chris
- Simoun (2006), Wapōrif
- Chocotto Sister (2006), Yuki's mother
- Tokyo Tribes (2006), Kei, Fujiwo
- Fate/stay night (2006), Ayako Mitsuzuri
- xxxHolic (2006), Fortune teller
- Project Blue: Chikyū SOS (2006), Magī
- Jigoku Shōjo Futakomori (2007), Ichiko Aida
- Shinkyoku Sōkai Polyphonica (2007), Coccino Ruby Stilmane
- Sky Girls (2007), Juria Kudō
- Saint Beast: Kōin Jojishi Tenshi Tan (2007), Yōnen Tenshi
- Darker than Black: Kuro no Keiyakusha (2007), Erika
- You're Under Arrest: Full Throttle (2007), Ikki
- Terra e... (2007), Toki
- Tōka Gettan (2007), Mihashi
- Higurashi no Naku Koro ni Kai (2007), Eriko
- Romeo x Juliet (2007), Juliet Fiammata Arst De Capulet
- Kyōran Kazoku Nikki (2008), Aichi Momokusa
- Kemeko Deluxe! (2008), Ryōta Minamino
- Nijū Mensō no Musume (2008), Angie
- Bamboo Blade (2008), Aoki
- Blassreiter (2008), Johann
- Persona -trinity soul- (2008), Yumi Tasaka
- Yakushiji Ryōko no Kaiki Jikenbo (2008), Matsumura
- Kupū~!! Mamegoma! (2009), Yui Mamekawa
- Kon'nichiwa Anne: Before Green Gables (2009), Mary Emerson
- Ookiku Furikabutte ~Natsu no Taikai-hen~ (2010), Sakaeguchi's sister
- HeartCatch PreCure! (2010), Erika Kurumi
- Wolverine (2011), Tsukino
- Blue Exorcist (2011), Imai
- Battle Spirits: Heroes (2011), Chihiro Kusaka
- Freezing (2011), Elize Schmitz
- Duel Masters Versus (2014), Lucifer
- Marvel Disk Wars: The Avengers (2014), Virginia "Pepper" Potts
- World Trigger (2014), Sakurako Taketomi
- Mob Psycho 100 II (2019), Dash Granny
- One Piece (2020), O-Cho

=== Anime film ===
Year	Title	Role	Note
2005	Eureka Seven: Good Night, Sleep Tight, Young Lovers	Gidget, Linck	
2007	Sword of the Stranger	Mokubō	
2008	Major: Yūjō no Winning Shot	Majima	
2009	Tales of Vesperia: The First Strike	Chastel Aiheap	
2010	Hutch the Honeybee	Nyorori	
2010	Pretty Cure All Stars DX2: Light of Hope - Protect the Rainbow Jewel!	Erika Kurumi / Cure Marine	
2010	HeartCatch PreCure! the Movie: Fashion Show in the Flower Capital...Really?!	Erika Kurumi / Cure Marine	
2011	Pretty Cure All Stars DX3: Deliver the Future! The Rainbow-Colored Flower That Connects the World	Erika Kurumi / Cure Marine	
2012	Pretty Cure All Stars New Stage: Friends of the Future	Erika Kurumi / Cure Marine	
2013	Pretty Cure All Stars New Stage 2: Friends of the Heart	Erika Kurumi / Cure Marine	
2014	Pretty Cure All Stars New Stage 3: Eternal Friends	Erika Kurumi / Cure Marine	
2015	Pretty Cure All Stars: Spring Carnival	Erika Kurumi / Cure Marine	
2016	Pretty Cure All Stars: Singing with Everyone - Miraculous Magic!	Erika Kurumi / Cure Marine	
2018	Hug! Pretty Cure Futari wa Pretty Cure: All Stars Memories	Erika Kurumi / Cure Marine	
2023	Pretty Guardian Sailor Moon Cosmos The Movie	Sailor Phi	

=== Video games ===
- 100% Orange Juice! (2019), Tomato
- Atelier Ayesha: The Alchemist of Dusk (?), Regina Curtis
- Bravely Default: Flying Fairy (2012), Praline à la Mode, Egil Meyer
- Bravely Second (2015), Praline à la Mode
- Fate/stay night [Realta Nua] (?), Ayako Mitsuzuri
- Rune Factory Oceans (?), Sera, Knit
- Azur Lane (2020), Eagle
