= Pretty Cure All Stars DX2: Light of Hope - Protect the Rainbow Jewel! =

2010 film by Takashi Otsuka

- Kanji: 映画プリキュアオールスターズDX2 希望の光☆レインボージュエルを守れ！
- Revised Hepburn: Eiga PuriKyua Ōru Sutāzu Dirakkusu Tsū: Kibō no Hikari☆Reinbō Jueru o Mamore!
- Directed by: Takashi Otsuka
- Screenplay by: Isao Murayama
- Based on: Pretty Cure by Izumi Todo
- Starring: see below
- Edited by: Yoshihiro Aso
- Music by: Naoki Satō; Yasuharu Takanashi
- Production company: Toei Animation
- Distributed by: Toei Company, Ltd.
- Release date: March 20, 2010
- Running time: 70 minutes
- Country: Japan
- Language: Japanese
- Box office: US$11,653,289

Pretty Cure All Stars DX2: Light of Hope - Protect the Rainbow Jewel! (Japanese: 映画プリキュアオールスターズDX2 希望の光☆レインボージュエルを守れ！, Hepburn: Eiga PuriKyua Ōru Sutāzu Dirakkusu Tsū: Kibō no Hikari☆Reinbō Jueru o Mamore!) is a 2010 Japanese animated action fantasy film based on the Pretty Cure franchise created by Izumi Todo. The film is directed by Takashi Otsuka, written by Isao Murayama, and produced by Toei Animation. The film was released in Japan on March 20, 2010.

Marking the second entry to the Pretty Cure All Stars crossover film series, as well as the second installment to the DX trilogy, the HeartCatch PreCure! team joins the previous Pretty Cure teams on protecting the Rainbow Jewel from an evil entity known as Bottom.

== Plot ==
The HeartCatch PreCure! team: Tsubomi and Erika receives an invitation from Chypre and Coffret to Fairy Park, where mascots and other fairies were working as they were handing out the Miracle Lights, and Coco and Nutts are presenting the Rainbow Jewel in their human forms. Then they encounter Fresh Pretty Cure! team: Love, Miki, Inori and Setsuna, whom are searching for other friends, which Tsubomi agrees to help. As exploring, Northa, Uraganos, Kintoleski and Mucardia appears before them. Both HeartCatch and Fresh team transforms, which shocks Blossom and Marine. As they're fighting, they learn that the villains were revived by an evil entity named Bottom, whom is seeking the Rainbow Jewel. As the latter Pretty Cures shows up, the villains retreat.

As the girls get to know each other, Bottom shows up and takes over the Fairy Park, separating the girls from their mascots. As other revived villains try to attack Tsubomi and Erika, each team assists them reuniting with Chypre and Coffret, one team at a time. As Blossom and Marine arrive where the Rainbow Jewel is located, Bottom absorbs the jewel and transform into a gigantic being. Remembering the promise that they've made, Blossom and Marine sparkle the Miracle Lights and all Pretty Cures receive Rainbow forms, and defeat Bottom with "Rainbow Jewel Solution". With everything back to normal, the girls enjoy themselves at the park.

In the post-credit scene, Tsubomi seems to freak out that she has woken up late, but Erika notices that the girls are waiting for them in front of their house.

== Voice cast ==
HeartCatch PreCure! cast

- Nana Mizuki as Tsubomi Hanasaki/Cure Blossom
- Fumie Mizusawa as Erika Kurumi/Cure Marine
- Taeko Kawata as Chypre
- Motoko Kumai as Coffret

Fresh Pretty Cure! cast

- Kanae Oki as Love Momozono/Cure Peach
- Eri Kitamura as Miki Aono/Cure Berry
- Akiko Nakagawa as Inori Yamabuki/Cure Pine
- Yuka Komatsu as Setsuna Higashi/Cure Passion
- Taiki Matsuno as Tart
- Satomi Kōrogi as Chiffon

Yes! PreCure 5 GoGo! cast

- Yūko Sanpei as Nozomi Yumehara/Cure Dream
- Junko Takeuchi as Rin Natsuki/Cure Rouge
- Mariya Ise as Urara Kasugano/Cure Lemonade
- Ai Nagano as Komachi Akimoto/Cure Mint
- Ai Maeda as Karen Minazuki/Cure Aqua
- Eri Sendai as Milk/Kurumi Mimino/Milky Rose
- Takeshi Kusao as Coco
- Miyu Irino as Natts
- Romi Park as Syrup
- Wataru Takagi as Bunbee
- Taeko Kawata as Princess Chocolat

Futari wa Pretty Cure Splash Star cast

- Orie Kimoto as Saki Hyuuga/Cure Bloom/Cure Bright
- Atsuko Enomoto as Mai Mishou/Cure Egret/Cure Windy
- Kappei Yamaguchi as Flappy
- Miyu Matsuki as Choppy
- Yuriko Fuchizaki as Moop, Michiru Kiyū
- Akemi Okamura as Fuup, Kaoru Kiyū
- Ayaka Saitō as Minori Hyuuga

Futari wa Pretty Cure Max Heart cast

- Yōko Honna as Nagisa Misumi/Cure Black
- Yukana as Honoka Yukishiro/Cure White
- Rie Tanaka as Hikari Kujo/Shiny Luminous
- Tomokazu Seki as Mepple
- Akiko Yajima as Mipple
- Haruna Ikezawa as Pollun
- Asuka Tanii as Lulun

Film character

- Kiyoyuki Yanada as Bottom

Returning villain characters include:

- Misa Watanabe as Northa
- Wataru Takagi as Uraganos
- Jūrōta Kosugi as Kintoleski
- Yoko Soumi as Arachnea
- Isshin Chiba as Karehaan
- Keiichi Nanba as Moerumba
- Naoko Matsui as Ms. Shitataare
- Kazue Komiya as Hadenya
- Bin Shimada as Nebatakos
- Ryōtarō Okiayu as Mucardia

== Production ==
The film is produced by the same key staff members from Pretty Cure All Stars DX: Everyone's Friends - The Collection of Miracles!: Takashi Otsuka directed the film at Toei Animation, Isao Murayama provided the screenplay, Mitsuru Aoyama designed the characters and provided the animation direction, and both Naoki Satō and Yasuharu Takanashi co-composed the music.

== Release ==
The film was released in theaters in Japan on March 20, 2010.

== Reception ==
=== Box office ===
The film debuted at number 2 out of top 10 in the Japanese box office in its opening weekend, later dropped to number 12 in its final weekend.
