= Healin' Good Pretty Cure =

Japanese anime television series

- Cover of the series' second Blu-ray Volume, showing the four main Cures. Clockwise from top left: Cure Fontaine, Cure Earth, Cure Sparkle, and Cure Grace.

ヒーリングっど♡プリキュア (Hīrin Guddo Purikyua)
- Genre: Magical girl
- Created by: Izumi Todo
- Anime television series
- Directed by: Yoko Ikeda
- Produced by: Yasui Kazunari
- Written by: Junko Komura
- Music by: Shiho Terada
- Studio: Toei Animation
- Licensed by: Crunchyroll (streaming); SEA: Muse Communication
- Original network: ANN (ABC TV, TV Asahi)
- Original run: February 2, 2020 – February 21, 2021
- Episodes: 45
- Manga
- Written by: Izumi Todo
- Illustrated by: Futago Kamikita
- Published by: Kodansha
- Magazine: Nakayoshi
- Original run: March 2020 – February 2021
- Volumes: 2
- Anime film

Healin' Good Pretty Cure: GoGo! Big Transformation! The Town of Dreams
- Directed by: Ryota Nakamura
- Written by: Ryūnosuke Kingetsu
- Music by: Shiho Terada
- Studio: Toei Animation
- Released: March 20, 2021
- Runtime: 70 minutes

Healin' Good Pretty Cure (Japanese: ヒーリングっど♡プリキュア, Hepburn: Hīrin Guddo Purikyua; stylized as Healin' Good♡Precure) is a Japanese magical girl anime television series produced by Toei Animation. It is the seventeenth installment of the Pretty Cure franchise and the first series in the Reiwa period. It premiered on ANN on February 2, 2020, succeeding Star Twinkle Pretty Cure in its time slot. It is the second series in the franchise to have nature as its main topic after Futari wa Pretty Cure Splash Star, with elements and medicine as the Cures' main motifs. It was succeeded by Tropical-Rouge! Pretty Cure on February 28, 2021.

== Story ==
13-year-old Nodoka Hanadera moves to the city of Sukoyaka (すこやか市, Sukoyaka-shi; Sukoyaka City) with her family in hopes of having a fresh start from her life in the city. Meanwhile, a place deep inside the Earth known as the "Healing Garden" (ヒーリングガーデン, Hīringu Gāden) is under attack from an antagonistic group called the Byogens, who aim to infect the Garden and slowly poison the planet. Its ruler, Queen Teatine, entrusts the care of her daughter Latte to three Healing Animals - Rabirin, Pegitan and Nyatoran - and tells them to go to the surface world and find three people whose hearts can resonate with their paws and partner with them. While on Earth, Nodoka and the fairies witness an attack from the Byogens: in a sudden twist of fate, Rabirin meets up with Nodoka, who despite her somewhat frail condition is determined to protect others. This resonates with Rabirin and gives Nodoka the power to become the Pretty Cure foretold in legend, Cure Grace. Joined by Chiyu (Cure Fontaine), Hinata (Cure Sparkle) and later they are joined by Asumi (Cure Earth), the four girls form the Healin' Good Pretty Cure team to fight against the threat of the Byogens and protect life on Earth and the Healing Garden.

== Characters ==
=== Pretty Cures ===
Nodoka Hanadera (花寺のどか, Hanadera Nodoka) / Cure Grace (キュアグレース, Kyua Gurēsu)
Voiced by: Aoi Yūki
The main protagonist. She is a second-year middle school student at Sukoyaka Middle School. Before the events of the series, she succumbed to an unknown illness caused by a Dark Seed from a Megabyogen, which eventually formed into Daruizen. This left her hospitalized during her childhood, and as she recovers years later, her frail condition causes her parents to move to Sukoyaka City for her to fully recover. She is kind, calm, and goes at her own pace, and strives to try many different things, but lacks the athletic ability to do so. Above all else, she wants to be of use to others. Her fairy partner is Rabirin. As Cure Grace, she is the Pretty Cure of flowers and her theme color is pink. She introduces herself as "The two overlapping flowers! Cure Grace!" (重なる二つの花！キュアグレース！, Kasanaru Futatsu no Hana! Kyua Gurēsu!).
Chiyu Sawaizumi (沢泉ちゆ, Sawaizumi Chiyu) / Cure Fontaine (キュアフォンテーヌ, Kyua Fontēnu)
Voiced by: Natsu Yorita
A girl who lives in Sukoyaka City, where her family runs a hot spring inn, and is a second-year middle school student at Sukoyaka Middle School. She lives a hygienic and cheerful lifestyle and is like an older sister who, if she sees anything wrong, will do anything to help. She is serious and has a strong sense of responsibility, striving to do everything herself. As well, she is sporty, being the ace of her school's track and field team, and intelligent, especially regarding science. Her fairy partner is Pegitan. As Cure Fontaine, she is the Pretty Cure of water and her theme color is blue. She introduces herself as "The two intersecting streams! Cure Fontaine!" (交わる二つの流れ！キュアフォンテーヌ！, Majiwaru Futatsu no Nagare! Kyua Fontēnu!).
Hinata Hiramitsu (平光ひなた, Hiramitsu Hinata) / Cure Sparkle (キュアスパークル, Kyua Supākuru)
Voiced by: Hiyori Kono
A girl who lives in Sukoyaka City, where her family runs an animal clinic and a café, and is a second-year middle school student at Sukoyaka Middle School. She is not good at studying. She is outgoing, friendly, and honest and tends to say what's on her mind. She loves fashion and makeup, and always stays up to date on the latest trends. Her fairy partner is Nyatoran. As Cure Sparkle, she is the Pretty Cure of light and her theme color is yellow. She introduces herself as "The two lights that come together! Cure Sparkle!" (溶け合う二つの光！キュアスパークル！, Tokeau Futatsu no Hikari! Kyua Supākuru!).
Asumi Fuurin (風鈴アスミ, Fūrin Asumi) / Cure Earth (キュアアース, Kyua Āsu)
Voiced by: Suzuko Mimori
A girl born from the spirit of the Healing Garden and Queen Teatine's wish for someone to protect Latte. She physically appears to be a 20-year-old woman, but was born recently. She resembles Fuu, the ancient Pretty Cure who Queen Teatine was partnered with long ago. As an entity born from the Healing Garden, she is calm and friendly, although sometimes naive. When she is depressed, she starts to become transparent and fade away, and her friends need to help her be in high spirits once more. Her character development centers around adapting to the modern world while fighting against the Byogens. She is physically the oldest, but mentally the youngest Pretty Cure in the franchise. Her fairy partner is Latte. As Cure Earth, she is the Pretty Cure of wind and her theme color is purple. She introduces herself as "The two winds that connect through time! Cure Earth!" (時を経てつながる二つの風！キュアアース！, Toki o hete tsunagaru futatsu no kaze! Kyua Āsu!).

=== Healing Garden ===
The Healing Garden (ヒーリングガーデン, Hīringu Gāden) is a magical place that Queen Teatine ruled until the Byogens invaded.

Rabirin (ラビリン)
Voiced by: Ai Kakuma
A pink rabbit-like fairy and Nodoka's fairy partner. She has a strong sense of justice and is very high-spirited, but sometimes makes mistakes.
Pegitan (ペギタン)
Voiced by: Hana Takeda
A blue penguin-like fairy and Chiyu's fairy partner. He is intelligent, but shy and lacking in confidence. Despite being modest, he will do what he can, even if things don't work out right. He loves hot springs.
Nyatoran (ニャトラン)
Voiced by: Aki Kanada
A yellow cat-like fairy and Hinata's fairy partner. Like Hinata, he is very free-spirited and says whatever is on his mind. He is also a show-off who tries to act cool and can have a quick temper. Because of their similarities, he and Hinata get along well.
Latte (ラテ)
Voiced by: Haruka Shiraishi
A brown dog-like fairy who is Asumi's fairy partner and the Young Princess of the Healing Garden (ヒーリングガーデンの幼い王女さま, Hīringu Gāden no Osanai Ōjo-sama) She does not speak and barks like a normal dog, but others can use a stethoscope to hear her inner voice. Like Teatine, she can detect when Byogens infect the Earth. She becomes sick when a Megabyogen is born, but can be healed using the power of rescued Element Spirits.
Queen Teatinu (クイーンティーティン, Kuīn Teatīnu)
Voiced by: Keiko Toda
Latte's mother. She is an adult Afghan Hound-like fairy and the ruler of the Healing Garden. She was severely wounded after her first clash with King Byogen, and the only survivor who remained in her homeland following the Byogens' invasion. Later on, she is revealed to have been the partner of Fuu, the ancient Pretty Cure that predated the current group. In episode 43, she heads to Earth to confront Neo King Byogen and traps him in a forcefield along with the other Healing Animals. However, the king breaks out and she is among those absorbed into him; nevertheless, everyone's determination to live frees them from the king.
Rayon (レイオン, Reion)
Voiced by: Kenichirou Matsuda
A lion-like fairy and one of Queen Teatine's knights.
Trine (トライン, Torain)
Voiced by: Daichi Endō
A tiger-like fairy and one of Queen Teatine's knights.
Sarlow (サルロー, Sarurō)
Voiced by: Hozumi Gōda
An elderly monkey-like fairy and the elder of the Healing Garden.
Suzuchun (スズチュン)
Voiced by: Aoi Yūki
A bird sparrow-like fairy from the Healing Garden.
Momomon (モモモン)
Voiced by: Natsu Yorita
A dormouse-like fairy from the Healing Garden.
Ferremin (フェレミン, Feremin)
Voiced by: Suzuko Mimori
A ferret-like fairy from the Healing Garden.
Hamtus (ハムタス, Hamutasu)
Voiced by: Haruka Shiraishi
A hamster-like fairy from the Healing Garden.

=== Elemental Spirits ===
The Elemental Spirits (エレメントさん, Eremento-san) are spirits that reside in the environment and objects. The Byogens corrupt them with Nanobyogens to turn them into Megabyogens. After being purified, the spirits grant Element Bottles that the Cures can use to treat Latte. They are voiced by Yumiri Hanamori, Sayaka Senbongi and Ai Furihata.

Flower (花, Hana)
An Elemental Spirit that resides in flowers.
Tree (木, Ki)
An Elemental Spirit that resides in the trees and forest.
Water (水, Mizu)
An Elemental Spirit that resides in water.
Light (光, Hikari)
An Elemental Spirit that resides in glass and mirrors.
Bubble (泡, Awa)
An Elemental Spirit that resides in bubbles.
Harvest (実り, Minori)
An Elemental Spirit that resides in fruits and crops.
Rain (雨, Ame)
An Elemental Spirit that resides in raindrops.
Ice (氷, Kōri)
An Elemental Spirit that resides in things that produce ice.
Jewelry (宝石, Hōseki)
An Elemental Spirit that resides in gemstones and rocks.
Lightning (雷, Kaminari)
An Elemental Spirit that resides in electronics and gadgets.
Wind (風, Kaze)
An Elemental Spirit residing in things that produce wind.
Leaf (葉っぱ, Happa)
An Elemental Spirit that resides in leaves.
Fire (火, Hi)
An Elemental Spirit that resides in things that produce fire.
Sun (太陽, Taiyō)
An Elemental Spirit that resides in things that catch sunlight.
Air (空気, Kūki)
An Elemental Spirit residing in things that produce air.
Sound (音, Oto)
An Elemental Spirit residing in things that produce sound.
Sea (海, Umi)
An Elemental Spirit that resides at beaches.

=== Byogens ===
The series' main antagonists. The Byogens (ビョーゲンズ, Byōgenzu) are a mysterious group of germ-themed villains based on demons who reside in the Byogen Kingdom (ビョーゲンキングダム, Byōgen Kingudamu). Their motive is to infect the Healing Garden and the world to reawaken King Byogen. The groups' name is derived from the Japanese word "Byōgen" (病源), meaning "origin of (the) disease", and its members are named after Japanese names relating to disease.

==== Leaders ====
King Byogen (キングビョーゲン, Kingu Byōgen)
Voiced by: Hozumi Gōda
The leader of the Byogens and the main antagonist of the series. He is a ruthless demon who was defeated by the ancient Pretty Cure long ago, when he almost conquered the Healing Garden and defeated Teatine. This caused him to lose his body and end up as a dormant spirit. In order to re-obtain his body, he assigns his minions to spread disease across the Earth to complete his body. In episode 39, the Cures apparently defeat him, leaving Guaiwaru to anoint himself as king. However, it is revealed in episode 41 that the Cures only destroyed part of his body, and that he knew of Guaiwaru's treachery and planned to absorb him once he enhanced himself further, with Shindoine assisting him in that plan. In episode 42, he absorbs Daruizen after the Cures defeat him, evolving and enhancing himself further into Neo King Byogen (ネオキングビョーゲン, Neo Kingu Byōgen). He subsequently infects all of Sukoyaka City and undermines Earth before Queen Teatine and her servants trap him in a forcefield to temporarily halt him. However, he breaks out, absorbs the Cures, Queen Teatine and Latte, and infects the entire world. Nevertheless, his victims break free and the Cures purify him, destroying him permanently.

==== Terra Byogens ====
Terra Byogens (テラビョーゲン, Terabyōgen) are demonic beings born after a Megabyogen's Dark Seed infects a host and matures over time before leaving its host and assuming a human form. They all serve under King Byogen as his generals and aim to spread disease to Earth to reawaken him. They use Nanobyogens to corrupt Elemental Spirits and create giant monsters called Megabyogens. Said monsters can be enhanced with crystals called Mega Parts, which are harvested from defeated Megabyogens. Once enhanced with Mega Parts, they gain the ability to infect humans and turn them into Giga Byogen. All Terra Byogens have scorpion-like tails and horns and wear red coats.

Daruizen (ダルイゼン, Daruīzen)
Voiced by: Mutsumi Tamura
A calm Terra Byogen with green hair and light blue skin. He has a laidback attitude and speaks softly, and looks down upon the Healing Animals. He can throw projectiles by creating dark orbs. It is later revealed that he was born from Nodoka after a Dark Seed infected her, making him responsible for her illness. In episode 33, he is forced to enhance himself with a Mega Part to gain power, gaining the ability to turn humans into Gigabyogens like the other generals. In episodes 41 and 42, he attempts to seek Grace's protection when the revived King Byogen attempts to absorb him, but she rejects his offer to protect her own health. He enhances himself with multiple Mega Parts to battle the Cures, only to be purified back to his usual form before being killed by King Byogen, who absorbs his remains. His name is derived from the word "Darui" (だるい), which means sluggish or languid.
Shindoine (シンドイーネ, Shindoīne)
Voiced by: Shizuka Itō
A wicked Terra Byogen woman with purple hair and light purple skin. She is King Byogen's oldest subordinate and is vastly devoted to him, taking offense towards her allies insulting him. After being ignored for so long, she uses a Mega Part to further evolve herself, gaining the ability to corrupt humans and turn them into Gigabyogens. In episode 41, it is revealed that she assisted King Byogen in his plan to absorb a treacherous Guaiwaru to regain his body and power. In episode 43, she enhances herself further to battle the four Cures, but is purified back to her original state as particles, which Cure Earth absorbs to develop a vaccine against King Byogen. Her name is derived from the word "Shindoi" (しんどい), which means tired or bothersome in Kansai dialect.
Guaiwaru (グアイワル, Guaīwaru)
Voiced by: Hiroki Yasumoto
A fierce and muscular Terra Byogen with orange hair and light green skin who solves problems by crushing his foes with brute force. In episode 32, he enhances himself with a Mega Part to prove he is better than Shindoine, gaining the ability to turn humans into Gigabyogens. In episode 39, he manipulates the Cures into defeating King Byogen for him as part of his plan to usurp him and becomes King Guaiwaru (キンググアイワル, Kingu Guaīwaru). He subsequently overpowers the Cures as they flee, infecting Sukoyaka City with multiple Megabyogens before the Cures intervene. Guaiwaru nearly kills them before King Byogen absorbs him, having known of his treachery, faked his demise, and used him to create a new body. His name is derived from the phrase "Guai (ga) Waru" (具合(が)悪い), meaning bad health.
Batetemoda (バテテモーダ, Batetemōda)
Voiced by: Sōichirō Hoshi
A cocky humanoid Terra Byogen who was born at the end of episode 11. He was born a nutria that was infected by a Dark Seed spawned by one of Daruizen's Megabyogens. Unlike the other three generals, he does not have horns, but instead wears a jacket, a black shirt and slippers. He is a strong fighter who battles for fun and sees the other generals as his family; this attitude is later revealed to be a ruse to prove he is better than the others. In episode 20, he is purified by Cure Earth using Healing Hurricane.
Nebsock (ネブソック, Nebusokku)
Voiced by: Eiji Takeuchi
A humanoid Terra Byogen who only appears in episode 24. He was created by Daruizen by fusing a Mega Part with a crow; ironically, he has a fear of heights. His name is derived from the word "nebusoku"(寝不足) which means "lack of sleep". He is purified by Cure Earth.
Kedary (ケダリー, Kedarī)
Voiced by: Akeno Watanabe
A Terra Byogen born when Daruizen inserted a Mega Part into Grace's body. His name is derived from the word "Kedarui" (気だるい) which means "languid" or "listless". He is ultimately purified by the Healing Oasis.
Mega Byogen (メガビョーゲン, Megabyōgen)
Voiced by: Kosuke Goto
The series' main monsters, which the Byogens summon. They are created by contaminating the Earth Spirits with a small bat-shaped demon called a Nanobyogen ナ ノ ビ ョ ー ゲ ン (Nanobyōgen). In episode 30, a more powerful variant of Megabyogen, known as Giga Byogen (ギガビョーゲン, Gigabyōgen) is created. When the Pretty Cure defeat them, they say Healing Goodbye... (ヒーリングッバイ..., Hīringubbai...)

=== Cures' family members ===
Takeshi Hanadera (花寺たけし, Hanadera Takeshi)
Voiced by: Eiji Hanawa
Nodoka's father, who works as an architect.
Yasuko Hanadera (花寺やすこ, Hanadera Yasuko)
Voiced by: Kazusa Murai
Nodoka's mother, who started working as a delivery truck driver after the family moved to Sukoyaka City.
Ryuuji Sawaizumi (沢泉りゅうじ, Sawaizumi Ryūji)
Voiced by: Daichi Endō
Chiyu's father.
Nao Sawaizumi (沢泉なお, Sawaizumi Nao)
Voiced by: Mayumi Sako
Chiyu's mother, who is the owner of the Sawaizumi Hot Spring Inn.
Touji Sawaizumi (沢泉とうじ, Sawaizumi Tōji)
Voiced by: Satsumi Matsuda
Chiyu's younger brother.
Kiyoshi Sawaizumi (沢泉きよし, Sawaizumi Kiyoshi)
Voiced by: Kiyomitsu Mizuuchi
Chiyu's grandfather.
Haruko Sawaizumi (沢泉はるこ, Sawaizumi Haruko)
Voiced by: Yukari Nozawa
Chiyu's grandmother.
Teruhiko Hiramitsu (平光てるひこ, Hiramitsu Teruhiko)
Voiced by: Kenichirou Matsuda
Hinata's father, who is the owner of his family's animal clinic.
Yota Hiramitsu (平光ようた, Hiramitsu Yota)
Voiced by: Ryōta Ōsaka
Hinata's older brother, who works as a veterinarian.
Mei Hiramitsu (平光めい, Hiramitsu Mei)
Voiced by: Yumi Kakazu
Hinata's older sister, who is the owner of the "Café Wonderful Juice" juice bar, and a pet groomer.

=== Others ===
Kyosei Maruyama (円山教生, Maruyama Kyōsei)
Voiced by: Kenji Hamada
Nodoka, Chiyu, and Hinata's headroom teacher and Kota's father.
Mina (みな) & Rina (りな)
Voiced by: Aki Kanada (Mina) & Satsumi Matsuda (Rina)
Hinata's friends.
Michio Masuko (益子道男, Masuko Michio)
Voiced by: Yūichi Iguchi
Nodoka's classmate, who tries to get the latest scoops at school as its newspaper editor. He attempts to stalk Nodoka, whom he believes is involved with the Byogens' attacks.
Ryoko (りょうこ, Ryōko) & Mizuki (みづき)
Voiced by: Sayaka Senbongi (Ryoko) & Ai Furihata (Mizuki)
Nodoka, Chiyu and Hinata's classmates. Ryoko is a member of the school's athletics club.
Kawai (川井さん, Kawai-san)
Voiced by: Mitsuaki Hoshino
An employee at the Sawaizumi Hot Spring Inn.
Chikara (力)
Voiced by: Hiroki Yasumoto
A guest at the Sawaizumi Hot Spring Inn, who has a big heart and tries to encourage a depressed employee. He is attacked by Guaiwaru and turned into a Gigabyogen, but the Cures ultimately purify him. He is the owner of a dog named Moko.
Sumire Nagara (長良澄子, Nagara Sumire)
Voiced by: Makoto Koichi
An artist who traveled to France to learn more about the art she loved.
Orie Kusaka (日下織江, Kusaka Orie)
Voiced by: Rena Maeda
She is a kind lady, who feels sentimental whenever she misses Honoo.
Honoo Kusaka (日下炎, Kusaka Honoo)
Voiced by: Chiharu Sawashiro
He is Orie's husband, and also a friendly and loving man. He used to work in a neighboring town, but returned after marrying Orie.
Mikio Habu (土生みきお, Hābu Mikio)
Voiced by: Masamichi Kitada
The store owner of Herb Garden (ハーブ園, Hābu-en), which Rabirin adores.
Emily Smith (エミリー・スミス, Emirī・Sumisu)
Voiced by: Chitose Morinaga
A foreigner who visits Japan with her parents (Voiced by: Yasuhiro & Rikako Aikawa) and stays at Sawaizumi Hot Spring Inn. She plans to move to Japan in the near future, but is worried about leaving her hometown behind to live in a new land. She gradually grows closer to Chiyu, who listens to her worries, and finally makes new friends while playing at the park.
Riri (りり)
Voiced by: Takako Tanaka
A young transfer student who discovers Pegitan, who was pretending to be a plushie, on a bench. She takes him home and plays with him, naming him Josephine (ジョセフィン, Josefin), but she soon learns he is real and becomes attached to him.
Riri's Mom (りりのママ, Riri no Mama)
Voiced by: Sayaka Senbongi
Riri's mother.
Kazu (カズ)
Voiced by: Yukitoshi Kikuchi
The leader of a hot air balloon team.
Ukima (浮間), Amano (天野) & Suita (吹田)
Voiced by: Shou Nogami (Ukima), Hitomi Sekine (Amano) & Ai Furihata (Suita)
The members of the hot air balloon team.
Kota Maruyama (円山孝太, Maruyama Kōta)
Voiced by: Asuna Tomari
Kyosei's son.
Shuichi (修一, Shūichi)
Voiced by: Ayaka Nanase
Kota's friend.
Manatsu Natsuumi (夏海まなつ, Natsuumi Manatsu) / Cure Summer (キュアサマー, Kyua Samā)
Voiced by: Fairouz Ai
A girl who is the main protagonist of Tropical-Rouge! Pretty Cure. Latte summons her to assist the Healin' Good Pretty Cure team in their battle against a Megabyogen pack, though she is knocked out by the monsters.

=== Movie characters ===
Miraclun (ミラクルン, Mirakurun)
Voiced by: Kurumi Inagaki
A clock-like fairy featured in Pretty Cure Miracle Leap who represents "tomorrow". She has the power to create Miraclun Lights, and is being chased down by Refrain.
Refrain (リフレイン, Rifurein)
Voiced by: Hiroaki Hirata
The main antagonist in Pretty Cure Miracle Leap, and a spirit who represents "yesterday" and has the power to turn back time. He is after Miraclun's power to halt time and repeatedly relive the same day. Despite his sheer power and transforming himself to overpower the Cures, he is ultimately defeated by Cure Grace, who becomes Super Miracle Grace and uses Healing Time Liberation.
Kaguya (カグヤ)
Voiced by: Seiran Kobayashi
A popular model who calls herself the Princess of Virtual Dreams.
Sarena Gashuuin (我修院サレナ, Gashūin Sarena)
Voiced by: Masako Katsuki
Kaguya's mother, who created the Virtual Dreams system.
Ego Ego (エゴエゴ)
Voiced by: Wataru Takagi
The main antagonist of Healin' Good Pretty Cure: GoGo! Big Transformation! The Town of Dreams.
Nicole Fujita (藤田 ニコル, Fujita Nicole)
Voiced by: Herself

== Media ==
=== Anime ===
On October 23, 2019, the Japan Patent office reported a filing for the series. On November 28, 2019, Toei Animation opened the site for Healin' Good PreCure. The franchise's traditional baton pass featuring Cure Star, the lead cure of the previous Pretty Cure season Star Twinkle PreCure, and Cure Grace, along with Fuwa and Rate was shown at the end of episode 49, the final episode of Star Twinkle PreCure. The series is directed by Yoko Ikeda, with Junko Komura handling series' composition, Naoko Yamaoka designing the characters, and Shiho Terada composing the music. It began airing on ANN on February 2, 2020, with an announcement show in Sunshine City, Tokyo that was broadcast live on YouTube the day before the series' premiere. The 13th episode, originally scheduled to air on April 26, 2020, was postponed until June 28, 2020, due to the COVID-19 pandemic, with the series re-airing select episodes during this time. Toei Animation and Arstech Guild used Unreal Engine 4 for the second ending animation. Crunchyroll streamed the series with original Japanese audio and English subtitles.

==== Video releases ====
The series is released on both DVD and Blu-ray via Pony Canyon in Japan. The first DVD volumes were released on July 22, 2020, while the first Blu-ray volume was first released on September 16, 2020.

==== Films ====
Characters from the series appear in the crossover film Pretty Cure Miracle Leap: A Strange Day With Everyone! (映画プリキュアミラクルリープ みんなとの不思議な1日, Eiga Purikyua Mirakuru Rīpu: Minna to no Fushigi na ichinichi), which also features characters from Hugtto! PreCure and Star Twinkle PreCure. The film was originally scheduled for release on October 31, 2020 (Halloween).

A standalone film, titled Healin' Good Pretty Cure the Movie: GoGo! Big Transformation! The Town of Dreams (映画ヒーリングっど♡プリキュア ゆめのまちでキュン！っとGoGo！大変身！！, Eiga Hīrin Guddo Purikyua Yume no Machi de Kyun! tto GoGo! Dai henshin!!) premiered on March 20, 2021. The film is a crossover between Healin' Good Pretty Cure series and Yes! PreCure 5 GoGo!, the 5th series in the franchise, including animated short titled Tropical-Rouge! Pretty Cure the Movie: Petit Dive! Collaboration Dance Party! (映画 トロピカル～ジュ！プリキュア プチ とびこめ！コラボ♥ダンスパーティ！, Eiga Toropikarūju! Purikyua Puchi Tobikome! Korabo▽Dansu Pāti!).

=== Manga ===
Futago Kamikita wrote and illustrated the manga adaptation of the series, which began serialization on Kodansha's Shōjo magazine Nakayoshi in March 2020. The first Tankobon volume is released on September 11, 2020, while the second volume was released on March 12, 2021.

=== Music ===
==== Opening ====
Song	Artist	Episodes
"Healin' Good PreCure Touch!!" (ヒーリングっど♥プリキュア Touch!!)	Rie Kitagawa	All

==== Endings ====
Song	Artist	Episodes
"Miracle and a Link Ring!" (ミラクルっと♥Link Ring！)	Machico	1 - 19
"Everybody☆Healin' Good Day!" (エビバディ☆ヒーリングッデイ！)	Kanako Miyamoto	20 - 45

==== Insert Song ====
Song	Artist	Episodes
"We are Alive!!"	Rie Kitagawa	45

==== Albums ====
Title	Release date	Length	Label	Ref.
Healin' Good♥Precure Theme Single (ヒーリングっど♥プリキュア主題歌)	March 25, 2020	15:49	Marvelous! (MJSS-09252~3)	
Healin' Good♥Precure Original Soundtrack 1: Precure Sound Garden!! (ヒーリングっど♥プリキュア オリジナル・サウンドトラック1 プリキュア・サウンド・ガーデン!!)	May 27, 2020	1:11:05	Marvelous! (MJSA-01284)	
Healin' Good♥Precure Vocal Album ~Voice of life~ (ヒーリングっど♥プリキュア ボーカルアルバム ~Voice of life~)	July 8, 2020	31:42	Marvelous! (MJSA-01285)	
Healin' Good♥Precure Character Single (ヒーリングっど♥プリキュア キャラクターシングル ~響き合う4つの声~)	July 22, 2020	12:23	Marvelous! (MJSS-09255)	
Healin' Good♥Precure 2nd Ending Theme Single (ヒーリングっど♥プリキュア後期エンディング主題歌)	September 9, 2020	17:51	Marvelous! (MJSS-09256~7)	
Healin' Good♥Precure Original Soundtrack 2: Precure Sound Oasis!! (ヒーリングっど♥プリキュア オリジナル・サウンドトラック2 プリキュア・サウンド・オアシス!!)	December 23, 2020	1:14:53	Marvelous! (MJSA-01302)	

Preceded by Star Twinkle PreCure	Healin' Good Pretty Cure; 2020-2021	Succeeded by Tropical-Rouge! Pretty Cure
