= Pretty Cure All Stars DX: Everyone's Friends - The Collection of Miracles! =

2009 film by Takashi Otsuka

Pretty Cure All Stars DX: Everyone's Friends - the Collection of Miracles!
- Kanji: 映画 プリキュアオールスターズDX みんなともだちっ☆奇跡の全員大集合!
- Revised Hepburn: Eiga PuriKyua Ōru Sutāzu Dirakkusu: Minna Tomodachi☆Kiseki no Zenin Daishūgō
- Directed by: Takashi Otsuka
- Screenplay by: Isao Murayama
- Based on: Pretty Cure by Izumi Todo
- Starring: see below
- Cinematography: Kenji Takahashi
- Edited by: Yoshihiro Aso
- Music by: Naoki Satō; Yasuharu Takanashi
- Animation by: Mitsuru Aoyama (Character Design & Animation Director)
- Backgrounds by: Midori Tanaka
- Production company: Toei Animation
- Distributed by: Toei Company, Ltd.
- Release date: March 20, 2009
- Running time: 70 minutes
- Country: Japan
- Language: Japanese
- Box office: US$9,099,922

Pretty Cure All Stars DX: Everyone's Friends - the Collection of Miracles! (Japanese: 映画 プリキュアオールスターズDX みんなともだちっ☆奇跡の全員大集合!, Hepburn: Eiga PuriKyua Ōru Sutāzu Dirakkusu: Minna Tomodachi☆Kiseki no Zenin Daishūgō) is a 2009 Japanese animated action fantasy film based on the Pretty Cure franchise created by Izumi Todo. The film is directed by Takashi Otsuka, written by Isao Murayama, and produced by Toei Animation. The film was released in Japan on March 20, 2009.

Marking the very first installment to the Pretty Cure All Stars crossover film series, as well as the fifth anniversary to the franchise overall, the Futari wa Pretty Cure Max Heart, Futari wa Pretty Cure Splash Star, Yes! PreCure 5 GoGo! and Fresh Pretty Cure! teams join forces to defeat a monster named Fusion.

== Plot ==
The Fresh Pretty Cure! team: Love, Miki and Inori, head to the dance contest being held in Minato Mirai 21 in Yokohama, but suddenly attacked by a creature named Fusion, formed by remnants of the Zakennas, Uzainas, Kowainas, and Hoshinas. (Note: The creatures; Zakennas are from Futari wa Pretty Cure Max Heart, Uzainas from Futari wa Pretty Cure Splash Star, and Kowainas and Hoshinas from Yes! PreCure 5 GoGo!) They transform and fight the creature, but the monster leaves in the middle of a fight as they lack power. In Palmier Kingdom, as the fairies Coco and Nutts explains the usage of the Rainbow Miracle Lights, Tart bursts in and tries to warn them about Fusion, but realizes that it followed him to the castle. In a frantic chaos, they all run away and end up separated from one another.

Lulun falls from the sky, and meets the Yes! PreCure 5 GoGo! team: Nozomi, Rin, Urara, Komachi, Karen and Kurumi, who realizes that she was being chased by a fragment of Fusion, they transform and fight. However, it absorbs their attacks and runs off. Moop and Foop ends up with the Futari wa Pretty Cure Max Heart team: Nagisa, Honoka, and Hikari, where the same thing happens to them as Fusion absorbs their attacks, and later with the Futari wa Pretty Cure Splash Star team: Saki and Mai, as they're protecting Coco, Nutts, and Syrup. Meanwhile, Love and the others tries to search for Chiffon, who've gone missing. The fragments of Fusion reunites in the sky, and spreads the darkness around the city. As Cures Peach, Berry and Pine demands Fusion where it took Chiffon, it fights and overpowers them, and traps the Cures in a pool of darkness. Determined to reunite the fairies to their respective partners, the Max Heart, Splash Star and Yes! 5 teams makes their way to the city and fights off their respective monsters. As the Fresh team pulls themselves out of the pool, a light shatters the dark dome and the three notice the three Pretty Cure teams surrounding them.

Angered, Fusion turns into a gigantic monster and attacks them. Refusing to give up, the Pretty Cures engage him in a long fight, but Fusion overpowers them. Just then, Chiffon appears with the Rainbow Miracle Lights and sends to every mascot. With its power, the Cures combine their attacks and destroy Fusion, restoring the city back to normal. Later at the dance competition, Love, Miki and Inori nervously dance and fail as the other girls are watching them, but accepts their slip-ups.

== Voice cast ==
Fresh Pretty Cure! cast

- Kanae Oki as Love Momozono/Cure Peach
- Eri Kitamura as Miki Aono/Cure Berry
- Akiko Nakagawa as Inori Yamabuki/Cure Pine
- Taiki Matsuno as Tart
- Satomi Kōrogi as Chiffon

Yes! PreCure 5 GoGo! cast

- Yūko Sanpei as Nozomi Yumehara/Cure Dream
- Junko Takeuchi as Rin Natsuki/Cure Rouge
- Mariya Ise as Urara Kasugano/Cure Lemonade
- Ai Nagano as Komachi Akimoto/Cure Mint
- Ai Maeda as Karen Minazuki/Cure Aqua
- Eri Sendai as Milk/Kurumi Mimino/Milky Rose
- Takeshi Kusao as Coco
- Miyu Irino as Natts
- Romi Park as Syrup
- Chihiro Sakurai as Kowaina
- Shinya Fukumatsu as Hoshina

Futari wa Pretty Cure Splash Star cast

- Orie Kimoto as Saki Hyuuga/Cure Bloom/Cure Bright
- Atsuko Enomoto as Mai Mishou/Cure Egret/Cure Windy
- Kappei Yamaguchi as Flappy
- Miyu Matsuki as Choppy
- Yuriko Fuchizaki as Moop
- Akemi Okamura as Fuup
- Hideo Watanabe as Uzaina

Futari wa Pretty Cure Max Heart cast

- Yōko Honna as Nagisa Misumi/Cure Black
- Yukana as Honoka Yukishiro/Cure White
- Rie Tanaka as Hikari Kujo/Shiny Luminous
- Tomokazu Seki as Mepple
- Akiko Yajima as Mipple
- Haruna Ikezawa as Pollun
- Asuka Tanii as Lulun
- Satoshi Taki as Zakenna

Film character

- Takehito Koyasu as Fusion

== Production ==
In February 2009, it was announced that a crossover feature film of the Pretty Cure film was in the works, featuring Futari wa Pretty Cure Max Heart, Futari wa Pretty Cure Splash Star, Yes! PreCure 5 GoGo!, and its current series, Fresh Pretty Cure!. The film will be directed by Takashi Otsuka at Toei Animation, Isao Murayama providing the screenplay, and Pretty Cure episode animation director Mitsuru Aoyama is providing the character designs and animation direction for the film.

== Release ==
The film was released in theaters in Japan on March 20, 2009.

== Reception ==
=== Box office ===
The film opened at number 5 out of top 10 in the Japanese box office in its opening weekend, and later fell to number 10 in its final weekend.
