= Some Dreams =

Studio album by Earphones
- Released: 14 March 2018
- Label: Evil Line Records
- Producer: Soichiro Hirano

Earphones chronology
Mystery Miracle Tour (2015)	Some Dreams (2018)

Singles from Some Dreams
- 1. "Arakajime Ushinawareta Bokura no Ballad" Released: 5 October 2016; 2. "Ikken Rakuchaku Goyoujin" Released: 15 February 2017

Some Dreams is the second studio album by the Japanese voice actress idol unit Earphones. It was released on 14 March 2018 through Evil Line Records. Some Dreams is a concept album with 12 songs that represent different dreams.

== Release and promotion ==
The album was released on 14 March 2018 in Japan. A limited edition and live edition of the albums were also released. The limited edition featured a bonus CD titled Earphones Music Trip which contained covers of the Neon Genesis Evangelion and Sailor Moon theme songs as well as solo songs sung by each members. The live edition featured live concert footage from Earphones 2nd Anniversary performance "Tsuki Sekai Ryokō Gakudan" (A Trip to the Moon) on Blu-ray.

Prior to the album's release, Earphones released a trailer for the album as well as a music video for "Shinjigen Kouro" and a lyric video for "Atashi no Naka no Monogatari". They also announced the "Some Dreams Tour 2018" for June/July 2018.

== Track listing ==
Regular edition
No.	Title	Lyrics	Music	Length
1.	"Shinjigen Kouro" (新次元航路 New Dimension Route)	Natsumi Tadano	Gesshoku Kaigi	6:09
2.	"Utopia Monogatari" (理想郷物語 Utopia Story)	Takahiro Yamada	Takahiro Yamada	3:36
3.	"Ikken Rakuchaku Goyoujin" (一件落着ゴ用心 Case Closed, Be Careful)	Natsumi Tadano	Masaru Yokoyama	4:42
4.	"Miichaikyuttontiigapuriutegubanko" (ミーチャイキュットンティーガプリウテグバンコ)	Saori Kodama	Takahiro Yamada	2:24
5.	"Atashi no Naka no Monogatari" (あたしのなかのものがたり A Story of Me)	Koshi Miura	Koshi Miura	6:08
6.	"Fuwa Kucha Dreamer" (Fuwa くちゃ Dreamer)	Akiko Kosaka	Akiko Kosaka	3:48
7.	"Arakajime Ushinawareta Bokura no Ballad" (予め失われた僕らのバラッド Our Lost Ballads)	Nagae Kuwahara	Endo	5:13
8.	"Witchcraft (Theophile no Kiseki)" (ウィッチクラフト(テオフィルの奇蹟) Witchcraft (Miracle of Theophile))	J. A. Seazer	J. A. Seazer	4:12
9.	"Yummy Yummy Party"	CHI-MEY	CHI-MEY	4:22
10.	"Sanki Tousen!" (サンキトウセン!)	Endo	Endo	4:30
11.	"Yorokobi no Uta" (ヨロコビノウタ The Song of Joy)	Yuho Iwasato	Frédéric Chopin, Johann Pachelbel, Johann Sebastian Bach, Christian Petzold, Georges Bizet, Gioachino Rossini, George Frideric Handel, Ludwig van Beethoven	5:05
12.	"Mirai Dorobo" (未来泥棒 Future Thief)	ROI, ROLLY	ROI, ROLLY	5:40

Earphones Music Trip Limited Edition (CD 2)
No.	Title	Lyrics	Music	Length
1.	"Zankoku na Tenshi no Tēze" (残酷な天使のテーゼ A Cruel Angel's Thesis)	Neko Oikawa	Hidetoshi Satō	3:54
2.	"Genshō no Blade" (現象のブレイド The Phenomenal Blade)	Kenji Ohtsuki	Narasaki	4:59
3.	"Otome no Policy" (乙女のポリシー Maid Policy)	Rui Serizawa	Rui Nagai	3:15
4.	"Parallel Gallop" (パラレルギャロップ Parareru Gyaroppu)	Tsuki Sekai Ryokō Gakudan	Tsuki Sekai Ryokō Gakudan	4:14
5.	"Unruly Coaster"	Tsuki Sekai Ryokō Gakudan	Tsuki Sekai Ryokō Gakudan	4:17
6.	"Iarusansetto" (いーあるさんせっと)	Tsuki Sekai Ryokō Gakudan	Tsuki Sekai Ryokō Gakudan	3:54
7.	"Oen Uta!" (応援歌 Cheering Song!)	Masumi Asano	Gesshoku Kaigi	5:35

Tsuki Sekai Ryokō Gakudan Live Edition (Blu-ray)
No.	Title	Length
1.	"Live concert from Earphones 2nd Anniversary "Tsuki Sekai Ryokō Gakudan" (月世界旅行楽団 A Trip to the Moon)"

== Personnel ==
Adapted from the album liner notes.

Earphones

- Marika Kouno
- Rie Takahashi
- Yuki Nagaku

Additional musicians

- a_kira – guitar & programming (Disc1-8)
- Endo – programming (Disc1-7, 10, 11)
- Nozomi Furukawa – guitar (Disc1-6)
- Takuma Hongo – bass (Disc1-8)
- Masaomi Joishi – guitar (Disc1-2)
- Gesshoku Kaigi – band arranged (Disc1-1, Disc 2-7)
- Tomoya Kashimura – bass (Disc1-11)
- Yuriko Koyama – chorus (Disc1-8)
- Akira Kushida – vocal (Disc1-3)
- Koshi Miura – sample & programming (Disc1-5)
- Shige Murata – bass (Disc1-5)
- Rui Nagai – programming, keyboards, guitar & bass (Disc1-12, Disc 2-3) chorus (Disc1-12)
- NARASAKI – programming (Disc2-2)
- Hitomi Niida – flugelhorn (Disc1-6)
- Takahito Obata – drum (Disc1-12)
- Tomohiro Ohkubo – programming (Disc1-9)
- ROLLY – guitar (Disc1-9, 12) chorus(Disc1-12)
- Shinya Saito – keyboards & programming (Disc1-4)
- Seazer to Akuma no Ie – performance (Disc1-8)
- Yoshinari Takeami – alto & tenor sax (Disc1-4)
- Kazuko Takebayashi – chorus (Disc1-8)
- Masayoshi Tanaka – drum (Disc1-8)
- Kohdai Tominaga – programming (Disc1-6)
- Tsuki Sekai Ryokō Gakudan - band arranged (Disc2-4, 5, 6)
- Hiroaki Tsutsumi – acoustic & electric guitar (Disc1-3)
- Takahiro Yamada – programming (Disc1-2)
- Masaru Yokoyama – programming (Disc1-3, Disc2-1)

Production

- Satoshi Akai – recording (Disc1-5, 6) mixing (Disc1-4, 5, 6)
- Yoshitaka Ishigaki – mixing (Disc1-9)
- Mitsuru Ishii – recording (Disc1-2, 3, 9, 11, Disc2-1, 3) mixing (Disc1-2, Disc2-3)
- Tarou Kimura – recording (Disc1-4, 8)
- Hiroyuki Kishimoto – recording (Disc1-1, 7, 10) mixing (Disc1-1, 7, 10, 11)
- KIMKEN - mastering
- Hideto Matsumoto – recording (Disc1-12)
- Jun Shouji – recording (Disc1-1, 2, 3, 4, 6, 8, 11, 12, Disc2-4, 5, 6, 7) mixing (Disc1-8, 12)
- Seiji Toda – recording (Disc2-2) mixing (Disc2-2)

Artwork and design

- BALCOLONY – art direction, design

== Charts ==
Year	Chart	Peak position
2018	Oricon	22
2018	Japan Hot Albums	48

== Release history ==
Region	Date	Label	Format	Catalog
Japan	14 March 2018	Evil Line Records	CD	KICS-3684
Japan	14 March 2018	Evil Line Records	2CD	KICS-93684
Japan	14 March 2018	Evil Line Records	CD+Blu-ray	NKZC-20～21
