= Sore ga Seiyuu! (song) =

Single by Earphones

from the album Mystery Miracle Tour
- Released: July 22, 2015
- Genre: J-pop
- Length: 4:25
- Label: Evil Line Records
- Songwriter: Masumi Asano (Lyrics) Yugo Sasakura (Music)

Earphones singles chronology
"Mimi no Naka e" (2015)	"Sore ga Seiyuu!" (2015)	"Hikari no Saki e" (2015)

Music video
- "Sore ga Seiyuu!" on YouTube

"Sore ga Seiyuu!" (それが声優!, That is a Voice Actor!) is a song by Japanese voice actress idol unit Earphones. It was released on July 22, 2015, and was used as the opening for the anime, Seiyu's Life!. The lyrics was written by Seiyu's Life!s manga writer, Masumi Asano and music was composed by Yugo Sasakura. Single B-side, "Anata no Omimi ni Plug In!" was used as the ending for the same anime.

== Music video ==
The video features Rie Takahashi, Yuki Nagaku, and Marika Kouno who are voicing main characters of Seiyu's Life!, performed in a room with many microphones.

== Track listing ==
CD (Earphones edition)
No.	Title	Lyrics	Music	Length
1.	"Sore ga Seiyuu!" (それが声優! That is a Voice Actor!)	Masumi Asano	Yugo Sasakura	4:25
2.	"Anata no Omimi ni Plug In!" (あなたのお耳にプラグイン! Plug In To Your Ears!)	Endo	Endo	4:56
3.	"Sore ga Seiyuu!" (instrumental)			4:25
4.	"Anata no Omimi ni Plug In!" (instrumental)			4:56

CD (Sore ga Seiyuu! edition)
No.	Title	Lyrics	Music	Length
1.	"Sore ga Seiyuu!" (それが声優! That is a Voice Actor!)	Masumi Asano	Yugo Sasakura	4:25
2.	"Anata no Omimi ni Plug In!" (あなたのお耳にプラグイン! Plug In To Your Ears!)	Endo	Endo	4:56
3.	"Senaka no Wing" (背中のWING Wing on Your Back)	Akiko Watanabe	Tsuki Tadashi	4:54
4.	"Sore ga Seiyuu!" (instrumental)			4:25
5.	"Anata no Omimi ni Plug In!" (instrumental)			4:56
6.	"Senaka no Wing" (instrumental)			4:54

DVD
No.	Title	Length
1.	"Sore ga Seiyuu!" (music video)
2.	"Sore ga Seiyuu!" (making of)

== Charts ==
Year	Chart	Peak position
2015	Oricon	36
2015	Japan Hot 100	85
2015	Japan Hot Animation	20

== Release history ==
Region	Date	Label	Format	Catalog
Japan	22 July 2015	Evil Line Records	CD	KICM-1616
Japan	22 July 2015	Evil Line Records	CD+DVD	KIZM-347
