= Akiba's Trip: The Animation =

Japanese anime television series

- Poster
- Genre: Action, comedy, supernatural
- Created by: Acquire
- Anime television series
- Directed by: Hiroshi Ikehata
- Produced by: Tadashi Hoshino; Masahiro Saito; Koji Abe; Hirotaka Kaneko; Tomo Shiota; Tetsuya Endo; Noritomo Isogai; Yukihiro Ito; Ryousuke Naya; Toshiyuki Miichi; Yosuke Fukushi
- Written by: Kazuho Hyodo
- Music by: Endō (GEEKS)
- Studio: Gonzo
- Licensed by: Crunchyroll
- Original network: AT-X, Tokyo MX, BS Fuji
- Original run: January 4, 2017 – March 29, 2017
- Episodes: 13

Akiba's Trip: The Animation is a Japanese anime television series based on the video game series of the same name developed by Acquire. It was animated by Gonzo and aired from January 4, 2017, to March 29, 2017.

== Plot ==
The series revolves around otaku teenager Tamotsu Denkigai and his sister Niwaka who are presently shopping in Akihabara, Tokyo, Japan. Suddenly, without warning, vampiric, cosplaying monsters known as "Bugged Ones" run rampant throughout the city. These creatures can possess anyone by biting them, and soon they cause total mayhem across the city. As Tamotsu is about to be attacked by one of these creatures, a mysterious girl wielding a baseball bat named Matome Mayonaka swings in and rescues him.

Together, Tamotsu and Matome fight against more Bugged Ones and their encounters with them keeps increasing. However, whilst protecting Matome, Tamotsu gets fatally injured by a Bugged One. Unaware to him, Matome is actually a high level Bugged One who is trying to protect the city. Left with no other choice, she revives him as a high level Bugged One and coerces him into joining her in battle.

Tamotsu, Matome, Niwaka team up with avid cosplayer Arisa Ahokainen and form a group called "The Electric Mayonnaise". While fighting, they notice that the only way to destroy the Bugged Ones is to rip their clothes off and expose them to sunlight. Taking advantage of this weakness, they vow to save their city from the Bugged Ones' wrath.

== Characters ==
=== Main characters ===
Tamotsu Denkigai (伝木凱タモツ, Denkigai Tamotsu)
Voiced by: Haruki Ishiya (Japanese); Alejandro Saab (English)
An otaku who got turned into a Bugged One by Matome after sacrificed his life to save her. He now helps Matome in her fight with the Bugged Ones and forming the vigilante group Electric Mayonnaise (でんきマヨネーズ, Denki Mayonēzu). Tamotsu is very focused on whatever hobby catches his interest, often ignoring responsibilities over his obsession. Among all his hobbies, he greatly enjoys playing with vintage technology, such as 8-bit arcade games and amateur radio devices. He takes odd part-time jobs to pay for his Otaku habits. His surname is a wordplay on 電気街 Denki Gai ("Electric Town"), which was Akihabara's post-war nickname.
Towards the anime's end, Tamotsu develops feelings for Matome.

Matome Mayonaka (万世架まとめ, Mayonaka Matome)
Voiced by: Rie Takahashi (Japanese); Jad Saxton (English)
A hazoku (Boss-level Bugged One) who protects Akiba from her kind. She is designated as the leader of vigilante group Electric Mayonnaise, a name she was originally against but accepted quickly. She is often referred to as "Mayo" by her friends. She saved Tomatsu's life by invoking a ritual to transform him into a Bugged One. Matome, Niwaka, and Arisa form an idol group called "Mania" (derives from the first syllables of each member's name) with a former idol as their manager. Having lived in Akiba for so long, she has developed a love for food and enjoys eating at the restaurants scattered around the city. Her surname derives from the Mansei Bridge (万世橋, Manseibashi) in Akihabara.
Matome develops a crush on Tamotsu early on but doesn't convey her feelings to him until near the end of the anime.

Arisa Ahokainen (アホカイネン・有紗, Ahokainen Arisa)
Voiced by: Yuki Nagaku (Japanese); Natalie Hoover (English)
A Finnish otaku who often dresses in cosplay outfits. Although human, Arisa possess superhuman strength and is fluent in several Martial arts. She is the third member of Electric Mayonnaise, and a member of the idol group "Mania" along with Matome and Niwaka. Although she's really smart, her eccentric personality makes her appear to be an airhead. Her catchphrase is "Moi", which means "Hi" or "Hello" in Finnish.
Niwaka Denkigai (伝木凱にわか, Denkigai Niwaka)
Voiced by: Marika Kōno (Japanese); Bryn Apprill (English)
Tamotsu's younger sister. She is a middle schooler and like her brother, Niwaka is an otaku and is often with him on many of his adventures in Akiba. She provides financial support and relays messages back to their parents when she visits. She, Matome and Arisa are the member of the idol group "Mania" .
Both Niwaka and Arisa are aware very early of Matome's crush on Tamotsu.
Tasujin Ratu (タスジン・ラトゥ, Ratu Tasujin)
Voiced by: Misaki Kuno (Japanese); Monica Rial (English)
An intelligent Indian professor who moves around on a Segway. Her original intention was the study the bugged ones but has become a support member of Electric Mayonnaise. Often giving the group advice and providing inventions for their battles.
Kage-san (かげさん)
Voiced by: Jouji Nakata (Japanese); Jeremy Inman (English)
Tamotsu's otaku friend who knows a lot about Akihabara. Often giving him advice on whatever hobby Tamotsu is working on at the moment. He has a very simplistic design similar to an emoji.

=== Vigilante Group ===
Suidōbashi (水道橋)
Voiced by: Mariko Honda (Japanese); Alison Viktorin (English)
Kozakura (小桜)
Voiced by: Yuki Takao (Japanese); Morgan Lauré (English)
Shōhei (昌平)
Voiced by: Kengo Kawanishi (Japanese); Chris Guerrero (English)
Hijiri (聖)
Voiced by: Shou Tajima (Japanese); Cris George (English)

=== Metrotica ===
Fukame Mayonaka (万世架ふかめ, Mayonaka Fukame)
Voiced by: Masumi Asano (Japanese); Dawn M. Bennett (English)
A mysterious woman who wears black clothes. She is revealed to be the Leader of Metrotica, and is also Matome and Urame's grandmother. She believes humans have corrupted and tinted Akiba. Fukame now wants to control and manipulate them to bring Akiba back to its former glory, or removed from the area all together. Even if it means destroying Akiba and rebuilding it back in her image.
Masuto Niikura (新倉 マスト, Niikura Masuto)
Voiced by: Kazuyuki Okitsu (Japanese); Clifford Chapin (English)
A GonTuber who works for Metrotica.
Urame Mayonaka (万世架まとめ, Mayonaka Urame)
Voiced by: Rie Takahashi (Japanese); Felecia Angelle (English)
Matome's twin sister and Fukame's granddaughter. She resents her sister for leaving the clan. Believing Matome had betrayed her and their grandmother's dream of ridding Akiba of its tainted corruption.
Hardman (バードマン, Hādoman)
Voiced by: Tesshō Genda (Japanese); Christopher R. Sabat (English)
A High Class Bugged One who runs a military weapons shop.
Naisu Muramura (ナイス 村々, Naisu Muramura)
Voiced by: Bin Shimada (Japanese); Greg Ayres (English)
A freelance photographer and Chibusa's camera man.
Lawrie Barbara (ローリー・バーバラ, Rōrī Bābara)
Voiced by: Aya Hisakawa (Japanese); Rachel Robinson (English)
She is the CEO of Mofmap.
Tsutomu Kuroi (黒井勤, Tsutomu Kuroi)
Voiced by: Wataru Takagi (Japanese); R Bruce Elliott (English)
He is the CEO of the "Maid & Butler Izakaya GON-chan cafe".
Diva Risa MacMaWhite (出井馬リサ・マクマホワイト, Deiba Risa Makumahowaito)
Voiced by: Shoko Nakagawa (Japanese); Janelle Lutz (English)
She is Master's manager.
Black Hole Kurota (ブラックホール 黒田, Burakkuhōru Kurota)
Voiced by: Tetsu Inada (Japanese); Chris Rager (English)
He is a well known competitive eater.

=== Other characters ===
Momo Tsukumo (ツクモ モモ, Tsukumo Momo)
Voiced by: Halko Momoi (Japanese); Lara Woodhull (English)
Akiba's popular Free Agent Maid. She is very tall.
Mashiro Kuga (空間真白, Kuga Mashiro)
Voiced by: Chinami Hashimoto (Japanese); Kristen McGuire (English)
She runs an "Anything Agency" Job center.
Chibusa Benikage (ばにかげ ちぶさ, Benikage Chibusa)
Voiced by: Chiaki Takahashi (Japanese); Whitney Rodgers (English)
A former idol who is the manager of the idol group formed by Matome, Niwaka and Arisa.
Denko Busujima (毒島 電子, Busujima Denko)
Voiced by: Ayana Taketatsu (Japanese); Leah Clark (English)
A former study partner of Ratu.
Matsuko (マツコ)
Voiced by: Aoi Yūki (Japanese); Brittany Lauda (English)
She is a well known gamer.
Jiro Nishi (二四時労, Nishi Jiro)
Voiced by: Arthur Lounsbery (Japanese); Austin Tindle (English)
Head Butler at the "Maid & Butler Izakaya GON-chan cafe".
Kin Shukudo (祝日土働, Shukudo Kin)
Voiced by: Sayuri Hara (Japanese); Michelle Lee (English)
Head Maid at the "Maid & Butler Izakaya GON-chan cafe".
Master
Voiced by: Atsushi Tamaru (Japanese); Ricco Fajardo (English)
He is a former teacher of Arisa.
Iketeru Masada (政田 池輝, Masada Iketeru)
Voiced by: Daisuke Ono (Japanese); Tyson Rinehart (English)
He is the CEO of the Princess Company.
Taiyō Tenkawa (天川太陽, Tenkawa Taiyō)
Voiced by: Wataru Hatano (Japanese); Ian Sinclair (English)

== Anime ==
An anime television series adaptation titled Akiba's Trip: The Animation was announced at Tokyo Game Show on September 15, 2016. The anime is meant to commemorate studio Gonzo's 25th anniversary. It is directed by Hiroshi Ikehata and written by Kazuho Hyodo, with animation by Gonzo. Character designs are produced by Hajime Mitsuda. The opening theme song is "Ikken Rakuchaku Goyoujin", performed by the voice actress music unit Earphones, while each episode features a different ending theme song by various singers or bands under the album title "AKIBA'S COLLECTION". The series aired from January 4, 2017, to March 29, 2017, and was broadcast on AT-X, Tokyo MX and BS Fuji.

Crunchyroll simulcast the series, while Funimation streamed an English dub. It is the first Funimation simuldub with episodes released the day of the original Japanese broadcast. The series was being used as a testing ground for faster simuldub releases with the goal to have new episodes out thirty minutes after the Japanese premiere.

=== Episode list ===
No.	Official English title Original Japanese title	Ending theme	Original release date
1	"Akiba's First Trip"	"B Ambitious!" by YuiKaori	January 4, 2017
Tamotsu Denkigai's life in Akiba changes when he meets a red haired battle girl. Tamotsu dies protecting her but is revived by her kissing him and is told his destiny is to fight like her.
2	"We Formed a Team - Call Us Electric Mayo!" "Chīmu Kessei, Rya Kushi te Denma" (Japanese: チーム結成、略して電マ)	"Rely Mirai" by mimimemeMIMI	January 11, 2017
After being turned into a Bugged One by Matome, Tamotsu is forced to work as her underling in Akiba. Also, he needs a job, and employs at a gun and military shop which turns out to house a bugged one. However, after beating him he disappears. Matome reveals that low leveled bugged ones return to normal. Bosses and high leveled bugged ones however disappear, and that is what will happen to Tamotsu and Matome if they are stripped.
3	"What Happens When You Mindlessly Follow Someone Who Offers You an Idol Debut" "Aidorudebyū dekiru to kiite, hoihoi tsuite itta kekka" (Japanese: アイドルデビューできると聞いて、ホイホイついていった結果)	"Sanki Tōsen" (Note: The portmanteau of "San (三; three; means the trio of heroines)" and "Ikki Tousen") by Earphones	January 18, 2017
The girls bump into a retired idol offering them an idol debut, who turns out to be a bugged one. After buying a ton of audio stuff, Tamotsu gets even more part-time jobs. The girls form an idol group called Manias.
4	"Ham Radio Fighters" "Musen hamu faitāzu" (Japanese: 無線HAMファイターズ)	"Sanki Tōsen" by Manias (Note: The cover version of ending theme in the previous episode has been sung by the group "Manias", which composed of the three heroines of the story and starred by the three same voice actresses from the group "Earphones".)	January 25, 2017
All the cellphones and devices in Akiba begin exploding. The team struggles to fight the bugged one who uses EM waves to destroy their clothes. The team decides to contact the professor's professor through radio as it cannot be hacked. The only problem is that he is in Brazil, which is on the other side of the world.
5	"No Reason I'd Lose" "Makeru yōso, nashi!" (Japanese: 負ける要素、なし！)	"Chōhannō Girl" by AŌP	February 1, 2017
At an arcade, a bugged one takes Niwaka hostage to force Tamotsu to participate in a fighting game tournament and defeat a top gamer. If he refuses, he will put Niwaka's life in danger.
6	"Your Memory is Full" "Memori ga ippai" (Japanese: メモリがいっぱい)	"Kokoro no Memory" by every♥ing!	February 8, 2017
There is a sale for computers, but Tamotsu decides to build his own. With the help of the professor he creates a computer with an AI that can talk named Pyuko.
7	"Only a Liar Says Something Is Too Hard" "Muri to iu no wa usotsuki no kotoba" (Japanese: 無理というのはウソつきの言葉)	"Koi ni Shinzan!" by Shoko Nakagawa	February 15, 2017
After breaking one of Niwaka's limited edition figurines, Tamotsu gets a new job at a maid/butler cafe, which soon turns out to be a place that hypnotizes normal people including Tamotsu.
8	"Akihabara Grand Tournament" "Akihabara dai butō-kai" (Japanese: 秋葉原大武闘会)	"Fighting☆Dramatic" by Milky Holmes	February 22, 2017
On a walk to buy a rice cooker, Arisa runs into her old master who turns out to be a bugged one. After upsetting the store clerk, they settle their battle by kung fu wrestling.
9	"Whoa, I Battled with Game Cards!" "Gēmu no kādo de tatakatte shimatta nodesuga!" (Japanese: ゲームのカードで戦ってしまったのですが！)	"Sekai jū no AKIHABARA de" by Haruko Momoi	March 1, 2017
Tamotsu gets a rare battle card in Battle Creatures, a game he was into as a kid. Meanwhile, vigilante groups begin breaking up due to circle crushing girls. The group traces the source to the princess company where the girls come from. Tamotsu challenges the leader to a card battle which he accepts.
10	"Did You Open Your Pyloric Canal?!" "Yūmon aite shimatta nodesu ka?" (Japanese: 幽門開いてしまったのですか？)	"Kūfukukara Yarinaose!" by petit milady	March 8, 2017
Tamotsu's friend gets a girlfriend which makes him envious. Niwaka and Arisa trick Matome into going on a fake date with him. Except the only thing they do is eat. However, when they enter a ramen shop they run into a guy named Black Hole Kurota. Kurota and Matome have a ramen eating contest which Matome wins by one bite. Matome, somehow still hungry gets dragged by Tamotsu to get dessert. Meanwhile, someone resembling Matome watches them.
11	"The Midsummer Akiba Festival Begins!" "Manatsu no akibafesu kaimaku!" (Japanese: 真夏のアキバフェス開幕！)	"DIVE TO LIVE" by i☆Ris	March 15, 2017
The girls prepare for their debut during the Akiba festival, while the girl who resembles Matome still watches them. Electric Mayonnaise is framed for many bad things and decide to capture the criminals themselves to prove their innocence. While battling the professor take photos to prove their innocence. The girls get ready to perform only for the Akiba festival to be canceled. After that, Tamotsu gets a call from Matome who is fighting the other Matome. However, after finding her, he is kissed by fake Matome, turning him human, and then falls into the water as soon as the real Matome finds him.
12	"Electric Mayo's Falling Apart!" "Denma ga barabaraja nēka!" (Japanese: 電マがバラバラじゃねーか！)	"Thank You" by Earphones	March 22, 2017
Matome's copy is revealed to be named Urame and Metrotica convinces the government to pass a law banning otaku from Akiba. Tamotsu wakes up and realizes he is human again. Although Tamotsu wants his power back to help, but Matome refuses to give him the "curse". Arisa is asked by executives to go to Diamonds, the CEO of a large company. After saying goodbye, Matome leaves on her own while Tamotsu becomes even madder them before. People begin to oppose the law, but are sooner or later arrested. Matome and Urame have a duel and during the duel, Urame reveals that she is Matome's twin sister, and in the past, Matome left the clan to fight against bugged ones and that their grandma is the leader of Metrotica. Matome begins losing the fight before Tamotsu comes and kisses Matome himself to get his powers back, and overpowers Urame. As Urame begins to get up, Arisa comes falling from the sky revealing that Diamond's pet panda was the one in danger. Matome and Urame's grandma announces that if they cannot have Akiba, no one will.
13	"Akiba's Last Trip"	-	March 29, 2017
Arisa, Niwaka, and the Professor interfere with the resisting members transition and they all escape while Tamotsu and Matome look for her grandma, Fukame. They beat up Masuto Niikura into telling them the master plan to take over Akiba and how to get into her hideout. They begin to talk about Matome's past and also learn that she is 78 years old. After Tamotsu sets off many traps they run into Fukame's elite bodyguards who got their powers from Fukame herself and copies of bugged ones they have defeated. The bodyguards retreat and run back to Fukame only to be sent down a chute through the ground. Fukame overpowers Tamotsu in one shot and binds Matome saying her opinion of Akiba. Tamotsu punches her in the face and along with Matome say no one person can say that a whole community is corrupted. Angered, Fukame turns Matome into a monster and begins destroying Akiba. The professor has a plan but it requires all the members of Mania present so Urame, who has amnesia from her previous fight, takes Matome's place. Tamotsu makes Matome remember Akiba and is thrown off. Pyuko comes and rescues him and Matome. Mania performs and the glow sticks the crowd holds gives Tamotsu and Matome power. That power creates a human like creature that defeats Fukame and her vessel. Once the battle's over Fukame apologizes to Matome and disappears. As the law is changed and Akiba gets rebuilt, Mania performs as it now consists of Niwaka, Arisa, and Urame. Tamotsu and Matome find out that they still can not leave Akiba. As they kiss and watch the sunrise, the professor vacuums the gas of Fukame and has some questions to ask Fukame.
