= Nolife (TV channel) =

- Country: France
- Broadcast area: National, Worldwide

Programming
- Language: French

Ownership
- Owner: Nolife S.A.

History
- Launched: 1 June 2007; 18 years ago
- Founder: Sébastien Ruchet; Alex Pilot
- Closed: 8 April 2018; 8 years ago

Links
- Website: www.nolife-tv.com (offline)

Availability

Streaming media
- Noco: noco.tv (offline)

Nolife was a French TV network. It described itself as TV "for geeks, nerds and otakus". Its main programming focused on videogames, Japanese culture, technology and various other topics. Its slogan was "Y a pas que la vraie vie dans la vie !" (There's not only real life in life!).

== History ==
Nolife was originally created as an independent TV network by Sébastien Ruchet and Alexandre Pilot, both of them having previously worked for other French TV channels through their production company Pocket Shami. Later, Pilot said that they wanted to create Nolife because a lot of their projects were refused by other TV networks. They took advantage of the possibility to launch a TV channel at a lower cost (a few hundred Euros per month) on the Free IPTV network.

In 2008, despite being well known in the videogame and anime/manga French audience, Nolife went through major financial difficulties and looked for new investors. Then a company they previously worked with, Ankama Games, offered to massively invest into Nolife without taking control over the company. This was announced during a fake farewell show on 13 June 2008, less than two weeks after the first birthday of the channel (the audience were not aware it was fake).

As of September 2009 the audience share is unknown, but an official Médiamétrie survey said that 12% of the people receiving TV by cable and satellite was interested in receiving this channel.

Despite those results, Nolife announced in June of the same year that the channel won't be broadcast on CanalSat (which holds a near monopoly in the French satellite market) due to huge transmission costs, nor on the French cable network Numericable (also almost monopolistic) for "technical reasons". A member of Nolife explained that this actually cut off advertising incomes for Nolife because of a market lock-down: Médiamétrie is the only recognized source for audience figures but it doesn't evaluate DSL IPTV audience despite the fact that at least as much French households receive IPTV as Satellite TV.

Consequently, following a business model used in open source software, a pay catch-up TV service named Nolife Online was launched on 26 August 2009 on the main site of Nolife. It hosts the archive of most of the shows of Nolife except TV series, anime and J-music-related shows. It is available worldwide while the French IPTV channel remains free of charge.

During the following year, Médiamétrie started to include IPTV in their measurements. Thanks to official audience figures, Nolife was finally able to enter the advertising market on equal footing with other niche channels.

The situation was stable until mid-2014; the advertising market being at an historical low meant the income of the channel suddenly dropped, making it more dependent on its still-existing catch-up service.

On April 1, 2018, after a special edition of 101% where new projects were announced like live events or a brand new esports channel, Sébastien Ruchet announced that it was a joke: Nolife failed to find new investors and was going to close 7 days later.

On April 8, after 10 years and 10 months of broadcasting, the final farewell show named "the end of [N]olife" was shown live on TV and on Twitch. It was followed by days of re-runs of the best shows produced since 2007, while the signal was being cut off by the various broadcasters.

== Programming ==
Nolife broadcast a lot of J-music video clips between the regular shows.

=== Daily ===
101% is the main daily show with news, game reviews and reports (20-30mn).

It also hosts many sequences that are individual shows, repeated between main shows :

- Hidden Palace – Hidden or unknown facts about a video game or a series of video games.
- La minute du geek – A geek corrects usual misconceptions
- Mon souvenir – A guest tells the story of his most striking memory about video games
- Oscillations – A real musicological analysis of the music of a video game
- OTO – News of the J-music world
- Retro & Magic (RAM) – Video game history
- Temps Perdu – Reviews of free online games to "earn more by losing time at work"
- Tôkyô Café – Everything about Japanese culture
- Debug Mode – Making of Nolife

=== Weekly ===
- J-Top – Chart of the most preferred J-music video clips on Nolife.
- Chez Marcus – Hosted by Marcus (Marc Lacombe), a well-known videogames journalist in France, who plays one of his favourite games at home.
- Ami Ami Idol : Hello! France – Reports and clips of idols, made in cooperation with Hello! Project.
- Kira Kira Japon – A Japanese show produced for Nolife by DLE Inc., including many original sequences and the series Eagle Talon.
- Roadstrip – Interviews of comic artists (of any nationality).
- Temps Réel – Demos and reports of the demoscene, made in cooperation with Pouët.net.
- Big Bug Hunter – Made by French Nerd, the hoster is Slim (Slimane-Baptiste Berhoun), and shows game bugs and glitches and how to do them.
- Les oubliés de la playhistoire – In this show which takes place in an animated classroom, Florent Gorges (writer/translator/book publisher) plays the role of a teacher who shows current game consoles such as the PS4 or the 3DS (which are the students), video games somewhat forgotten from 70's to today by highlighting their qualities even if they have not made history.

=== Monthly ===
- Classés 18+ – Previews, reviews and news about games that are rated 18+. By law, such games cannot be shown or discussed before 22:30 on French TV, so Classés 18+ is broadcast only by night and is advertised for viewers aged 16+. (2 hours)
- Superplay Ultimate – A superplayer comes to the show and comments a record of one of his play on the game of his choice, like a score attack or a speedrun
- OTO EX – extended version of OTO
- OTO Play – Reviews of original soundtracks of videogames
- Format Court – Short films and interviews of their creators
- The Incredible Horror Show – Reviews of horror movies and reports
- EXP – Reviews of role-playing games
- Hall of Shame – Reviews of the worst video games ever made.
- The Golden Show – Humor show hosted by Davy Mourier and Monsieur Poulpe.

=== Series ===
==== Anime ====
Anime are aired in Japanese with French subtitles.

- Animation Runner Kuromi
- Chikyuu shōjo Arjuna
- City Hunter : Bay City Wars
- City Hunter : Million Dollar Conspiracy
- Rurōni Kenshin : Tsuiokuhen
- Rurōni Kenshin : Seisōhen
- Haibane Renmei
- Berserk
- City Hunter 3 (uncensored version)
- City Hunter 91 (uncensored version)
- Top ō nerae! Gunbuster
- Top ō nerae! 2 Diebuster
- S-CRY-ed
- Eyeshield 21 (episodes 1 & 2 only)
- Kareshi kanojo no jijō
- FLCL

==== Live ====
- NerdZ
- Flander's Company
- Noob
- Lazy Puppy
- Le Visiteur du Futur
- CréAtioN
- J'ai jamais su dire non
- France Five

== Notes ==
- Weekly results of the J-Top are sent back to Japanese labels and producers.
- Having worked as a video game journalist in Japan several years before creating Nolife, Alexandre Pilot and his wife Suzuka Asaoka were in touch with a lot of people of the Japanese video-game industry, so some well-known Japanese game creators appeared as guests on Nolife. This also resulted in airing some little-known or unknown material before, like a video clip of UmJammer Lammy.
- The main theme of Nolife was composed by Yuzo Koshiro and was released on the album Tamiuta
- The theme of 101% was composed by Akira Yamaoka. he composed a new theme in 2010.
- The theme of Tokyo Café was composed by Nobuyoshi Sano, an episode showed the composer making the song.
- The theme of Big Bug Hunter is composed by Aural Vampire.
- The theme of toco toco is composed by Hige Driver.
- The video clip of Twinkle Star by Halcali was shown on Nolife before its first air in Japan.
- The bottom bar of the on-air "Nolife" logo acts as a progress bar for each video clip, show or any other kind of sequence.
- The name "Nolife" is often perceived negatively by English-speaking people. The original staff stated that the name was also perceived negatively by them when they found it, but that after one week of thinking they couldn't came with a name describing more accurately the channel.
- According to Alexandre Pilot, dubbing is often used to trick translations and make quick video editing, so the choice was made to broadcast series and reports with subtitles in order to respect the creators, the guests and the audience.
- Disappointed by the pay EPG systems that don't allow to advertise shows in realtime with accurate precision, Nolife launched its own system named NoAir, which consists of posting program information on their website in XML, letting their audience writing clients.
- Test videos before the official launch displayed an old arcade game-like title screen, with the Nolife logo, a high score on the top left corner, "Credits: 0" at the bottom and "Insert coins" below the Nolife logo, in alternance with an MS-DOS prompt.
- One hour before the official launch, a hexadecimal countdown started to run. A real bug then crashed the video, but it came back half an hour later. Near the end it morphed into an oldschool demo and crashed with a Guru Meditation, followed by an Amiga-like reboot. Then Nolife launched with a Game Boy-like opening.
- During the fake farewell show, the original arcade-like title screen appeared again after a "Game Over" screen. After several seconds, a coin insertion sound was heard, and 1 credit was added.
