= Churata Churaha =

Single by Earphones
- Released: 3 July 2019
- Genre: Space pop, lounge pop
- Length: 4:01
- Label: Evil Line Records
- Songwriter(s): Gesshoku Kaigi

Earphones singles chronology
"Ikken Rakuchaku Goyoujin" (2017)	"Churata Churaha" (2019)

"Churata Churaha" (チュラタ チュラハ) is a song by Japanese voice actress idol unit Earphones. It was released on 3 July 2019 and was used as the soundtrack for 2019 anime movie, Space Attendant Aoi. The song features whisper voice and kiss sound (chu) from all members. Prior to the single's release, they released video with members doing ASMR. Single's B-side, Wagamamana Allegory, was used as theme song for Puro Christmas 2018 at Sanrio Puroland.

== Music video ==
Music video for "Churata Churaha" was directed by Pink ja Nakutemo. The video features Earphones doing photoshoot for the single's jacket and singing in the film roll.

== Track listing ==
All lyrics are written by Gesshoku Kaigi.

CD (Regular edition)
No.	Title	Length
1.	"Churata Churaha" (チュラタ チュラハ)	4:01
2.	"Wagamamana Allegory" (わがままなアレゴリー)	4:37
3.	"Radio "Earphones no Sanheiho no Teiri" Special Series"

Blu-ray (Limited edition)
No.	Title	Length
1.	"full-length of "Some Dreams Tour 2018 - Shinjigen no Mirai Dorobō at Toyose PIT" on 7 July 2018."

== Charts ==
Year	Chart	Peak position
2019	Oricon	27

== Release history ==
Region	Date	Label	Format	Catalog
Japan	3 July 2019	Evil Line Records	CD	KICM-1955
Japan	3 July 2019	Evil Line Records	CD+Blu-ray	NKZM-1011
