= Seiyu's Life! =

Japanese four-panel dōjin manga series

- Cover of the first manga volume

それが声優! (Sore ga Seiyū!)
- Genre: Comedy, slice of life
- Manga
- Written by: Masumi Asano
- Illustrated by: Kenjiro Hata
- Original run: December 2011 – August 2017
- Volumes: 5
- Anime television series
- Directed by: Hiroshi Ikehata
- Written by: Michiko Yokote
- Music by: Yukari Hashimoto
- Studio: Gonzo
- Licensed by: NA: Funimation
- Original network: Tokyo MX, MBS, BS Fuji
- English network: US: Funimation
- Original run: July 7, 2015 – September 29, 2015
- Episodes: 13 + 1 OVA

Seiyu's Life! (Japanese: それが声優!, Hepburn: Sore ga Seiyū!, lit. That is a Voice Actor!) is a Japanese four-panel dōjin manga series. The manga is written by voice actress Masumi Asano, with art by Kenjiro Hata, and is released under the circle name Hajimemashite. The manga launched at Comiket 81 in December 2011, with further releases at each subsequent Comiket until August 2017. An anime television series adaptation produced by Gonzo aired from July to September 2015.

== Plot ==
The series follows three friends, Futaba Ichinose, Ichigo Moesaki, and Rin Kohana, who are all rookie voice actresses. As the girls go through their individual troubles of working in voice acting, they end up hosting a web radio show together and form the unit, Earphones.

== Characters ==
=== Main characters ===
Futaba Ichinose (一ノ瀬 双葉, Ichinose Futaba)
Voiced by: Rie Takahashi
A shy and nervous rookie voice actor, who has a tendency to overthink what kind of performance she should give. In between jobs, she works part-time at a convenience store. She has a stuffed doll called Korori-chan (コロリちゃん) that she occasionally voices to in order to give herself encouragement (in the anime, Korori-chan is also used to explain the various aspects of the voice acting industry). She is a member in the unit Earphones
Ichigo Moesaki (萌咲 いちご, Moesaki Ichigo)
Voiced by: Yuki Nagaku
A hyperactive girl who often claims to be a princess from a strawberry planet as part of her character. She works part-time jobs which she sometimes gets fired from due to absences. She has a cheerful character that can make Futaba and Rin carried by the atmosphere. She is a member of the unit Earphones.
Rin Kohana (小花 鈴, Kohana Rin)
Voiced by: Marika Kōno
A polite 15-year old girl who does voice roles while also attending junior high school. Although her age is the most young, she has an excellent ability as a voice actress. She also is a part of the unit Earphones.

=== Aozora Production ===
- Hikari Shiodome (汐留 ヒカリ, Shiodome Hikari; Voiced by: Hitomi Nabatame): Futaba's senior voice actress from the same agency.
- Aoi Konno (紺野 あおい, Konno Aoi,; Voiced by: Nozomi Furuki): New manager at Aozora Production who starts off as Futaba's manager and is later put in charge of Earphones.
- Atsumari-san (集さん; Voiced by: Ami Koshimizu): Senior manager at Aozora Production.
- Taisuke Yamori (家守 太輔, Yamori Taisuke; Voiced by: Nobuyuki Hiyama): Futaba's senior voice actor who was being harsh on her but came to acknowledge her after her performance when they dubbed a foreign horror film together with Rikiya Koyama.

=== Production staff of Budha Fighter Bodhisattvon ===
- Kaibara-san (海原さん; Voiced by: Kenta Miyake): Producer who scouted Futaba, Ichigo, and Rin to host web radio and form Earphones.
- Sound Director (音響監督, Onkyō Kantoku), Voiced by: Eiji Takemoto
- Director (ディレクター, Direkutā), Voiced by: Susumu Chiba

=== Sakuranbo Theater Group ===
- Sayo-chan (サヨちゃん; Voiced by: Ayane Sakura): Rin's childhood friend and classmate who also claimed herself as Rin's first fan.
- Manager of Sakuranbo Theater Group (劇団さくらんぼマネージャー, Gekidan Sakuranbo Manējā), Voiced by: Akemi Kanda

=== Voice Entertainment ===
- Manager of Voice Entertainment (ボイスエンタテイメントマネージャー, Boisu Entateimento Manējā), Voiced by: Yūji Ueda

=== Earphones's family ===
- Ichigo's father (いちごのお父さん, Ichigo no Otōsan), Voiced by: Kentarō Itō
- Rin's mother (鈴のお母さん, Rin no Okāsan), Voiced by: Satomi Satō

== Media ==
=== Manga ===
The dōjin manga series, written by Masumi Asano with art by Kenjiro Hata, was first published at Comiket 81 in December 2011 under the Hajimemashite circle label, with subsequent releases sold at each following Comiket.

=== Anime ===
An anime television adaptation aired in Japan from July 7 to September 29, 2015. The series was licensed for streaming by Funimation in North America and by AnimeLab in Australia and New Zealand. The opening theme is "Sore ga Seiyuu!" (それが声優!, Seiyu's Life!) by Earphones (Rie Takahashi, Yuki Nagaku, and Marika Kouno), while the ending theme is "Anata no Omimi ni Plug In!" (あなたのお耳にプラグイン!, Plug In! To Your Ears) by Earphones, with each episode featuring a "Request Corner" section covering a popular anime theme song. The ending theme for episode six is "Mimi no Naka e" (耳の中へ, Into Your Ears) by Earphones, which is also used as the theme for the web radio show, while the ending theme for episode 13 is "Hikari no Saki e" (光の先へ, Towards the Light) by Earphones.

==== Episode list ====
No.	Title	"Request Corner" theme	Guest stars	Original release date
1	"Recording" "Afureko" (アフレコ)	"A Cruel Angel's Thesis" (from Neon Genesis Evangelion)	Masako Nozawa	July 7, 2015
Futaba Ichinose, a rookie voice actress, nervously does an anime recording session alongside other rookie voice actress, Ichigo Moesaki and Rin Kohana, and veteran Masako Nozawa. During the recording, Futaba gets a chance to fill-in for a bit role, but due to her tendency to overthink the performance she should go for, ends up getting passed over.
2	"Audition" "Ōdishon" (オーディション)	"Hito Toshite Jiku ga Bureteiru" (from Sayonara, Zetsubou-Sensei)	Hiroshi Kamiya	July 14, 2015
After getting to meet Hiroshi Kamiya, Futaba is given an audition for a manga adaptation, which Ichigo and Rin also coincidentally happen to be applying for. Later, Futaba becomes downhearted when a recurring character she is voicing gets killed off early. Just then, Futaba, Ichigo, and Rin are approached by the show's producer, Kaibara, who wants them to appear in a web radio show.
3	"Web Radio" "Uebbu Rajio" (WEBラジオ)	"Endless Story" (from C3)	Yukari Tamura	July 21, 2015
In the build up to their web radio show, Futaba and the others get the chance to promote the show on a live radio show, which has Yukari Tamura appearing as a guest. When it comes to recording the real thing, however, the girls start to struggle to come up with discussion topics.
4	"Unit" "Yunitto" (ユニット)	"Moon Pride" (from Sailor Moon Crystal)	Banjo Ginga	July 28, 2015
With the anime she was working on ending, Futaba, who had failed her earlier audition, starts to fret about not having any more work in the pipeline once the web radio show ends. During the anime's wrap-up party, Futaba meets Banjo Ginga, who gives her some encouragement. Following the web radio's final broadcast, the producer reveals that, on top of the show continuing, he wants Futaba, Ichigo, and Rin to form a unit named "Earphones", complete with a CD debut. As each girl goes through their own worries, they get together for a magazine interview and feel relieved that they'll be together.
5	"Event" "Ibento" (イベント)	"Love Destiny" (from Sister Princess)	Yui Horie	August 4, 2015
Ichigo ends up getting fired from her part-time job due to constantly missing shifts and finds the electricity shut off in her apartment. Just then, she manages to get a voice role in a video game, becoming asked to appear at an event with the rest of the voice cast, which includes Yui Horie. As Ichigo becomes nervous about how big the event turnout will be, she is surprised to find Horie is a lot more slovenly than her public appearances suggest. During the event, Ichigo gets very nervous and starts to doubt herself, but feels calmed by Horie's mini concert. Afterwards, Ichigo feels happy to receive a fan letter from one of the attendees while she and the others are given the song for Earphones' debut single.
6	"Music Video Filming" "Pī Bui Satsuei" (PV撮影)	--	Rie Kugimiya	August 11, 2015
While worrying about the prospect of having to memorize lyrics and prepare herself for a music video shoot, Futaba recalls when she took part in a drama CD recording alongside Rie Kugimiya. Futaba soon discovers that the manga she did the drama CD for is getting an anime adaptation, becoming excited about potentially working with Kugimiya again. However, Futaba becomes shocked when it is announced that the character she played in the drama CD will be voiced by Rin in the anime. As Futaba becomes depressed, uncertain of how to face Rin, her co-worker Hikari Shiodome tells her that regardless of what a voice actor goes through, it is their job not to let it show in their performance. Afterwards, Futaba puts aside her jealousy and looks forward to hearing Rin's interpretation of the character, allowing everyone to give their all for the music video shoot. However, the girls soon learn their CD's release date is being delayed.
7	"Dubbing" "Fukikae" (吹き替え)	"Eternal Blaze" (from Magical Girl Lyrical Nanoha A's)	Rikiya Koyama	August 19, 2015
The girls assemble at the same studio for separate jobs; with Futaba dubbing a foreign horror film alongside Rikiya Koyama, Ichigo recording an audiobook, and Rin doing a game voiceover. During the dubbing session, Futaba runs into some issues, as well as some pressure from another voice actor, Yamori, who doesn't think much of her, but manages to pull through. Meanwhile, Ichigo has to try to voice in a lower tone than usual while Rin tries to perform reactions to different levels of attack. At the end of the day, each of the girls manage to finish their respective jobs in one piece, with Futaba receiving compliments from both Yamori and Koyama.
8	"Narration" "Narēshon" (ナレーション)	"You Get To Burning" (from Martian Successor Nadesico)	Yūji Machi	August 26, 2015
Earphones holds a mini concert to commemorate the release of their debut single, with a small but dedicated turnout. Despite the others being more popular than her, Futaba feels pleased when at least one fan comes a long way to see her. Later, Futaba is called in for a narration job at a TV studio, where she observes the dedicated performance of Yūji Machi. As Futaba struggles with recording her segment due to not getting the script and video until the last minute, Machi assures her that everyone goes through those troubles, allowing her to give a more relaxed performance.
9	"Manager" "Manējā" (マネージャー)	"Get Along" (from Slayers)	Noriko Hidaka	September 1, 2015
This episode follows the events of the previous episodes from the perspective of Futaba's recently appointed manager, Aoi Konno. While doing her best to help Futaba with her work, her workload increases when she is also put in charge of Earphones once it is formed. When Futaba goes through her ordeal over losing a role to Rin, Konno feels saddened over not being able to do anything, but feels relieved when she pulls through on her own. Later, Konno gets scolded for getting Futaba's hopes up following an audition for a role she's never played before, but receives some encouragement from Noriko Hidaka, who expresses how actors can grow from trying new roles. Afterwards, Konno manages to get Futaba two jobs in one day, fretting over getting her to the second recording on time. However, after the two dash to the studio on foot, Konno receives gratitude from Futaba after she is praised for her work, reminding her of why she chose to become a manager.
10	"Future Plans" "Shinro" (進路)	"Rondo - Revolution" (from Revolutionary Girl Utena)	Hiroshi Kamiya	September 8, 2015
Rin becomes troubled when her teacher suggests she attend a different high school, which would be beneficial for her work but also separate her from her best friend Sayo. As Rin becomes torn over whether she should continue being a voice actress, she is offered a role in an animated movie alongside Hiroshi Kamiya. During the recording, Rin struggles with playing the role of a 15-year-old, but Kamiya assures her that he too feels the pressure of living up to the expectations of all the other. After the movie recording, Rin decides to apply for a different high school, receiving full support from Sayo, who promises that they'll always be together even if they attend different schools.
11	"Self Care" "Jiko Kanri" (自己管理)	"Happy Material" (from Negima! Magister Negi Magi)	Ryoko Shiraishi, Aice5	September 15, 2015
Futaba is chosen as a program-reg, a voice actress who regularly voices bit parts, in a western anime starring Ryoko Shiraishi. After the first day of recording, Futaba's throat starts acting up from the intense bit part she played, and has to miss a week of recording after getting a cold. While walking home with Futaba the week afterwards and hearing about her determination to keep up with Ichigo and Rin, Shiraishi explains how she got vocal cord nodules from pushing herself too hard and needed throat surgery. Later, as Earphones gets its first solo concert booked, Ichigo takes on the task of choosing and choreographing cover songs to fill the concert's runtime, while everyone also has to try to promote the concert in order to fill their venue. Just as things are progressing, Ichigo ends up spraining her ankle.
12	"Concert" "Raibu" (ライブ)	--	Yui Horie	September 22, 2015
Ichigo tries to play her sprained ankle off as nothing serious, asking Futaba and Rin to keep it a secret from the other staff so as not to betray everyone's expectations. Hearing from Horie about her experiences in concerts, as well as being part of a unit herself, Futaba decides it best not to keep Ichigo's injury a secret and instead focus on revising their choreography and setlist to make things easier on Ichigo. Meanwhile, Sayo makes some flags for the performance while Konno manages to come up with a way to adjust everyone's outfits so Ichigo's injury doesn't stand out. As the concert manages to become a great success thanks to everyone's efforts and support, Ichigo decides to dance her all for their encore performance.
13	"Assessment" "Satei" (査定)	--	Masumi Asano	September 29, 2015
A month after Earphones' concert, Futaba faces an assessment to determine whether she can stay at Aozora Productions. While pondering how she will be assessed, Futaba meets up with some of her friends from training school, some of whom went on to different career paths, before being asked to think about where she wants to be in the future. On the day of her assessment, Futaba faces harsh criticism due to her lack of work but manages to work up the courage to state her desire to work as a voice actress for a long time. Although not able to move up to a higher position in the company, Futaba is given a deferral, allowing her to work at Aozora for another year in order to prove herself as a voice actress who can work for a long time.
OVA	"Little Launch" "Puchi Uchiage" (プチ打ち上げ)	--	--	March 23, 2016
Following the success of their event, the girls are rewarded with a trip to a hot spring hotel. While entertaining some children with their voices, the girls attract the attention of the hotel's staff, who ask them to put on a performance for the guests.

=== Voice actor unit ===
Earphones (イヤホンズ, Iyahonzu) is a real life seiyū unit formed of the series' main cast; Rie Takahashi, Yuki Nagaku, and Marika Kouno under Evil Line Records of the King Records label. They continue to release songs and perform live even after the anime Seiyu's Life! ended.
