= Campus Special Investigator Hikaruon =

Japanese original video animation

- Japanese Blu-Ray cover of Campus Special Investigator Hikaruon, illustrated by Kazuhiro Ochi

学園特捜ヒカルオン (Gakuen Tokusou Hikaruon)
- Genre: Action, Adventure
- Original video animation

Gakuen Tokusou Hikaruon
- Directed by: Kazuhiro Ochi
- Produced by: Toru Miura
- Written by: Kazuhiro Ochi
- Music by: Michiaki Watanabe
- Studio: AIC
- Released: January 28, 1987
- Runtime: 29 minutes

Campus Special Investigator Hikaruon (学園特捜ヒカルオン, Gakuen Tokusō Hikaruon) is a Japanese original video animation produced by AIC. The OVA is a one-shot tribute to the Metal Hero series of live-action superhero shows that were prevalent in the 80s and 90s, specifically to the Space Sheriff trilogy of Gavan, Sharivan and Shaider.

The one-shot deals with dark subject matters such as bullying and teen suicide.

== Plot ==
17 year old student Hikaru Shihoudo is Hikaruon, a metal-clad super hero fighting the forces of the evil organization known as Uraer. When five high school students commit suicide with no indication as to why, Hikaru the detective is dispatched to pose as a transfer student and involve himself in student life to get to the bottom of things.

On the surface, what he sees is a case of unhappy students in a school where money and status rule all; but Hikaru cannot accept things for what they seem to be, and he soon finds himself on the trail of an evil so powerful that it could not have been derived from this dimension. Now, he must learn how this mastermind is controlling all of the unfortunate happenings at school, and stop him from taking more innocent lives for his own selfish pleasure.

Disguised as a transfer student, he must investigate the strange suicides in town alongside Azumi Hazuki, his 22 year old home room teacher.

== Characters ==
- Hikaru Shihodo (四方堂 光, Shihōdō Hikaru): Toshihiko Seki
- Azumi Hazuki (葉月 あづみ, Hazuki Azumi): Mika Doi
- Shiro Amakusa (天草 志郎, Amakusa Shirō): Kazuyuki Sogabe
- Yayoi Shiina (椎名 弥生, Shiina Yayoi): Miina Tominaga
- Demonic Beast (妖魔獣, Yōmajū): Shōzō Iizuka
- Kyosuke Gomi (五味狂介, Gomi Kyōsuke): Tesshō Genda

== Production ==
The OVA was directed and written by animator, Kazuhiro Ochi. The OVA was released in 1987 via VHS.

The theme of the OVA is "Rekkuu! Gakuen Tokusou Hikaruon ~Theme Of Hikaruon~" by Kumi Kaneko and Akira Kushida. The music was composed by Michiaki Watanabe.

Hikaruon received a Blu-Ray release in Japan on October 12, 2022, which included the soundtrack and a booklet that included behind the scenes materials and an interview between Toshihiko Seki and Toru Nakano.
