= Triloquist =

- Theatrical poster
- Directed by: Mark Jones
- Written by: Mark Jones
- Produced by: Jack Edward Sawyers Michael Levine
- Starring: Paydin LoPachin; Rocky Marquette; Katie Chonacas; Brian Krause
- Cinematography: Mark Melville
- Edited by: Peck Prior
- Music by: Geoff Levin
- Distributed by: Dimension Extreme
- Release date: July 15, 2008
- Running time: 81 minutes
- Country: United States
- Language: English
- Budget: 1,000,000

Triloquist is a 2008 American horror film written and directed by Mark Jones and produced by Jack Edward Sawyers, Marlon Parry, and Michael Levine. It stars Paydin LoPachin, Rocky Marquette, Katie Chonacas and Brian Krause.

== Plot ==
Angelina is a young woman whose ventriloquist mother died from an overdose, orphaning Angelica and her brother Norbert, who is left particularly traumatized and mute. Together with her mother's ventriloquist dummy Dummy, who is capable of walking and talking on his own, the siblings are sent to live with their perverted uncle, who Dummy kills for abusing Angelica. In the resulting chaos Dummy is placed in a suitcase for several years. He is later retrieved by the siblings so that Dummy can speak for Norbert, however soon after Dummy attacks a child for perceived disrespect against Norbert. Everyone, including Angelica, assumes that Norbert was behind the attack and Norbert is placed in a mental institution.

Angelica begins working at a strip club to make ends meet. She approaches the manager about performing a ventriloquist act and when he refuses, the manager is murdered by Dummy. Frustrated, Angelica decides to free Norbert and head to Vegas, with Dummy murdering several people along the way. They also kidnap a woman, Robin, so that Norbert can impregnate her and carry on the family name. During the trip Angelica and Dummy clash several times, as Dummy wants Norbert to take him and leave Angelica behind. They run into more issues when they are captured by a police officer who rescues Robin. Angelica murders the officer and they travel to a cabin, where she encourages Norbert to rape and impregnate Robin. She briefly debates killing Robin when they learn that the police are following them, but decides to further encourage Norbert to complete his task.

Robin manages to trick Norbert into believing that she loves him, taking the opportunity to attack Dummy and escape. She is caught by Angelina, who knocks Robin out and reveals to Norbert that she has been voicing Dummy all along. This infuriates her brother, who tries to kill Angelica. In the ensuing fight Norbert is stabbed to death and Dummy seemingly dies with him. Angelica is also shocked during the fight and is also near death. Robin manages to escape and when she returns with the police, they find that Angelica has fled with Dummy. The film then reveals that Angelica and Dummy managed to make it to Vegas, however she was unable to become successful. Angelina is also shown to have been impregnated by Norbert and dies soon after giving birth to their baby. The film ends with a still alive Dummy holding the baby boy.

== Cast ==
- Paydin LoPachin as Angelina
- Rocky Marquette as Norbert
- Katie Chonacas as Robin Patterson
- Brian Krause as Detective
- Tha Realest as Rapper

== Release ==
Triloquist was released on Dimension Extreme DVD in 2008.

== Reception ==
Triloquist received mixed reviews. The review aggregator Rotten Tomatoes lists only a single critic review. A reviewer for iF Magazine found that one of the main faults of the film was that it was filled with subsequently-unsolved "teases". A review on Horror Society, however, praised LoPachin's role. Kim Newman described the film's ending as "an unusual and effective spin on the killer-vanishes-in-case-there’s-a-sequel schtick".

Paul Nicholasi of Dread Central rated the film 2 out of 5, writing that the film was "a mess" and that although he was initially curious to see how it played out, he eventually found the movie tiresome.

== See also ==
- Ventriloquism
