= Akira Kushida =

Akira Kushida 串田 アキラ
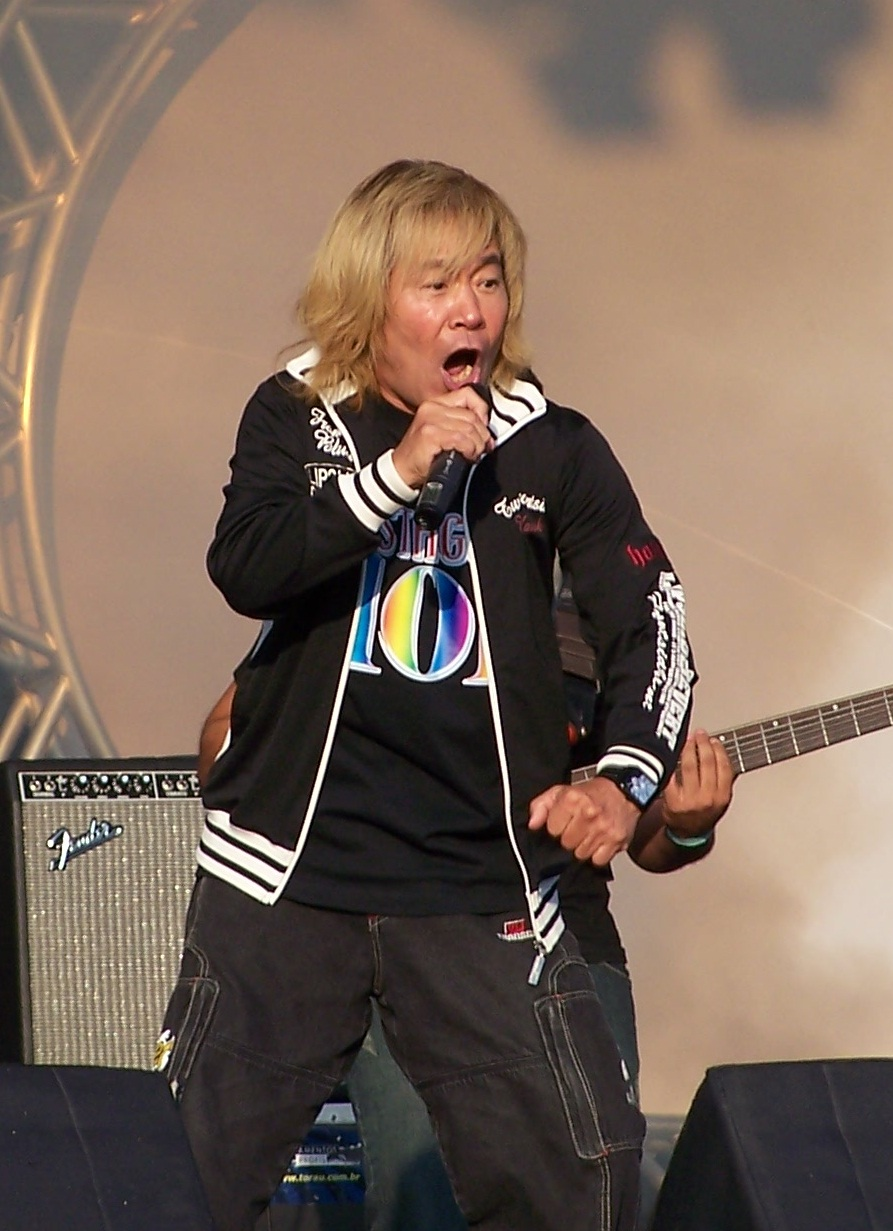
- Akira Kushida performing at Anime Friends 2008

Background information
- Born: October 17, 1948 (age 77); Yokohama, Kanagawa, Japan
- Occupation: Singer
- Instrument: Singing
- Years active: 1969–present

Akira Kushida (串田 アキラ, Kushida Akira) is a Japanese singer who is well known for his work in the soundtracks for anime and tokusatsu productions, most notably Taiyou Sentai Sun Vulcan, Kinnikuman, and Space Sheriff Gavan. His nickname from his fans is Kussy (クッシー, Kusshī). His real given name is Akira (晃, Akira).

== Discography ==
Only opening and ending themes are included on this list.

=== Anime television ===
- "Shippū Xabungle" (疾風ザブングル, Shippū Zabunguru; Combat Mecha Xabungle OP/1982)
- "Kawaita Daichi" (乾いた大地; Combat Mecha Xabungle ED/1982)
- "Kinnikuman Go Fight!" (キン肉マンGo Fight!, Kinnikuman First OP/1983)
- "Niku 2x9 Rock n' Roll" (肉・2×9Rock'n Roll, Niku Niku Rock'n Roll; Kinnikuman First ED/1983)
- "Honō no Kinnikuman" (炎のキン肉マン; Kinnikuman Second OP/1984)
- "Kinnikuman Sensation" (キン肉マン旋風(センセーション), Kinnikuman Sensēshon; Kinnikuman Final OP/1986)
- "KA・BU・TO" (Karasu Tengu Kabuto OP/1990)
- "Shinkon Gattai Godannar!!" (神魂合体ゴーダンナー!!, Shinkon Gattai Gōdannā!!; Godannar OP/2003)
- "Waga Na wa Godannar" (我が名はゴーダンナー, Waga Na wa Gōdannā; Godannar Second Season ED/2004)
- "Live Change Shiyou!" (ライブチェンジしよう!, Raibu Chenji Shiyou!; Live-On Cardliver Kakeru ED/2008)
- "Guts Guts!!" (Toriko First OP/2011)
- "Go Shock My Way!!" (Toriko Second OP/2013)
- "Ore ka Omae ka Genkai Battle!!" (オレカ オマエカ 限界バトル!!, Oreca Battle OP/2014)
- "Ikken Rakuchaku Goyoujin (一件落着ゴ用心, Akiba's Trip: The Animation OP/2017)
- "Kyūkyoku no Battle" (究極の聖戦(バトル), Kyūkyoku no Batoru; Dragon Ball Super IS/2017)
- "Arano ni Sake yo Bōkensha-tachi" (荒野に咲けよ冒険者たち, "Bloom in the Wasteland O Adventurers," The Ossan Newbie Adventurer OP/2024)

=== OVA ===
- "Rekkū! Gakusen Tokusō Hikaruon" (裂空!学園特捜ヒカルオン; Campus Special Investigator Hikaruon OP/1987)
- "Shōri da! Big Cytron" (勝利だ!ビッグ・サイトロン, Shōri da! Biggu Saitoron; Nurse Witch Komugi IM/2002)
- "Gods" (New Getter Robo ED/2004)

=== Tokusatsu ===
Taiyou Sentai Sun Vulcan (1981)

- "Taiyou Sentai Sun Vulcan" (太陽戦隊サンバルカン, Taiyō Sentai San Barukan; OP)
- "Wakasa wa Plasma" (若さはプラズマ, Wakasa wa Purazuma; ED1)
- "1 tasu 2 tasu Sun Vulcan" (1たす2たすサンバルカン, Ichi tasu Ni tasu San Barukan; ED2)

Space Sheriff Gavan (1982)

- "Space Sheriff Gavan (宇宙刑事ギャバン, Uchū Keiji Gyaban; OP)
- "Hoshizora no Message" (星空のメッセージ, Hoshizora no Messēji; The Starry Sky's Message) ED

Space Sheriff Sharivan (1983)

- "Space Sheriff Sharivan" (宇宙刑事シャリバン, Uchū Keiji Shariban; OP)
- "Strength is Love" (強さは愛だ, Tsuyosa wa Ai da; ED)

Space Sheriff Shaider (1984)

- "Space Sheriff Shaider" (宇宙刑事シャイダー, Uchū Keiji Shaidā; OP)
- "Hello! Shaider" (ハロー! シャイダー, Harō! Shaidā; ED)

Birth of the 10th! Kamen Riders All Together!! (1984)

- "Dragon Road" (ドラゴン・ロード, Doragon Rōdo; OP)
- "FORGET MEMORIES" (ED)

MegaBeast Investigator Juspion (1985)

- "Chou Wakusei Sentou Hokan Daileon"

Sekai Ninja Sen Jiraiya (1988)

- "Jiraiya" (ジライヤ; OP)
- "SHI-NO-BI '88" (ED)

The Mobile Cop Jiban (1989)

- "The Mobile Cop Jiban" (機動刑事ジバン, Kidō Keiji Jiban; OP)
- "Tomorrow's Forecast is Always Sunny" (未来予報はいつも晴れ, Ashita Yohō wa Itsumo Hare; ED)

Hyakujuu Sentai Gaoranger (2001)

- "A lone wolf ~Gin no Senshi~" (A Lone Wolf ～銀の戦士～, A Lone Wolf ～Gin no Senshi～; 24 & 25)

Ninpu Sentai Hurricaneger (2002)

- WIND & THUNDER

Bakuryū Sentai Abaranger (2003)

- "We are the ONE ~Bokura wa Hitotsu~" (We are the ONE〜僕らはひとつ〜; ED)
- "ABARE-SPIRIT FOREVER"
- "Emotion is MAX!" (Kibun ha MAX!)

Shin Kenjūshi France Five (2004)

- "Shin Kenjūshi France Five" (新剣銃士フランスファイブ, Shin Kenjūshi Furansu Faibu; OP)

Mahou Sentai Magiranger (2005)

- Song For Magitopia (with Ichiro Mizuki & Hironobu Kageyama)

Go! Go! Speed Phantom

- "Go! Go! Speed Phantom" (GO!GO!スピードファントム, GO! GO! Supīdo Fantomu; OP)

Lion-Maru G (2006)

- "Kaze yo Hikari yo" (風よ光よ; OP)

GoGo Sentai Boukenger (2006)

- "Fly Out! Ultimate Daibouken" (フライアウト!アルティメットダイボウケン, Furaiauto! Arutimettodaibouken)

GoGo Sentai Boukenger vs. Super Sentai (2007)

- "Densetsu" (伝説) with Takayuki Miyauchi & MoJo

Juken Sentai Gekiranger (2007)

- "Ossu! Geki Chopper!" (押忍!ゲキチョッパー!, Ossu! Gekichoppā!)

Engine Sentai Go-onger (2008)

- "G12! Checker flag" (G12! チェッカーフラッグ, G12! Chekkāfuraggu)

Samurai Sentai Shinkenger (2009)

- "Samurai Gattai! Shinkenoh" (侍合体！シンケンオー, Samurai Gattai! Shinken'ō)

Kamen Rider OOO (2010)

- O Scanner, Medagabryu (Kamen Rider OOO's transformation device and weapon, voiced by Kushida in the series)
- "Climax Heroes OOO" (theme song for the tie-in PSP/Wii game)
- "POWER to TEARER" (With Shu Watanabe. Kamen Rider OOO Putotyra Combo's ending theme.)

Tensou Sentai Goseiger (2010)

- "Festival" (フェスティバル, Fesutibaru)

Gokaiger vs. Gavan (2012)

- "JUMP" (With Tsuyoshi Matsubara. Ending of Gokaiger vs Gavan The Movie)

Space Sheriff Gavan: The Movie (2012)

- "Space Sheriff Gavan – Type G (宇宙刑事ギャバン -Type G-, Uchū Keiji Gyaban -Taipu Ji-)

Zyuden Sentai Kyoryuger (2013)

- Yuuki Bakuretsu (勇気バクレツ, Yūki Bakuretsu; "Courageous Explosion") (with Mayumi Gojo)

Ressha Sentai ToQger (2014)

- Ressha Sentai ToQger Safari (with Mitsuko Horie)

=== Films ===
- "ROLLIN' INTO THE NIGHT ~Theme of Mad Max~" (ROLLIN' INTO THE NIGHT 〜マッドマックスのテーマ〜, ROLLIN' INTO THE NIGHT ~Maddo Makkusu no Tēma~; Mad Max theme/1979)

=== Video games ===
- "TIME DIVER" (Super Robot Wars Alpha insert theme/2000)
- "Kimi wa Senkō ☆ THUNDERBOLT" (君は閃光☆THUNDERBOLT, Kimi wa Senkō ☆ Sandāboruto; Super Tokusatsu Taisen 2001 OP/2001)
- "Free Gun" (フリーガン, Furī Gan; Free Gun/2001)
- "Uchuu Tokumu Diszevan" (宇宙特務ディスゼバン, Uchū Tokumu Disuzeban; 2008)
- Original Soundtrack (宇宙刑事魂, The Space Sheriff Spirits, 2006)

=== Advertisement songs ===
- Fuji Safari Park
- Microman
- Ogawa Coffee
