= Arakajime Ushinawareta Bokura no Ballad =

Single by Earphones

from the album Some Dreams
- Released: 5 October 2016
- Genre: J-Pop
- Length: 5:13
- Label: Evil Line Records
- Songwriter: Nagae Kuwahara (Lyrics) Endo (Music)
- Producer: Soichiro Hirano

Earphones singles chronology
"Hikari no Saki e" (2015)	"Arakajime Ushinawareta Bokura no Ballad" (2016)	"Ikken Rakuchaku Goyoujin" (2017)

"Arakajime Ushinawareta Bokura no Ballad" (予め失われた僕らのバラッド, Our Lost Ballads) is a song by Japanese voice actress idol unit Earphones. It was released as fourth single on 5 October 2016 and was used as the soundtrack for 2016 PS Vita game, Mary Skelter: Nightmares. All songs from the single were featured on their 2nd studio album, Some Dreams.

== Music video ==
The music video for "Arakajime Ushinawareta Bokura no Ballad" was directed by Pink ja Nakutemo. The video features Earphones performed in distortion world.

== Track listing ==
CD (Regular edition)
No.	Title	Lyrics	Music	Length
1.	"Arakajime Ushinawareta Bokura no Ballad" (予め失われた僕らのバラッド Our Lost Ballads)	Nagae Kuwahara	Endo	5:13
2.	"Yummy Yummy Party"	CHI-MEY	CHI-MEY	4:22
3.	"Yorokobi no Uta" (ヨロコビノウタ The Song of Joy)	Yuho Iwasato	Frédéric Chopin, Johann Pachelbel, Johann Sebastian Bach, Christian Petzold, Georges Bizet, Gioachino Rossini, George Frideric Handel, Ludwig van Beethoven	5:05
4.	"Arakajime Ushinawareta Bokura no Ballad" (instrumental)			5:13
5.	"Yummy Yummy Party" (instrumental)			4:22
6.	"Yorokobi no Uta" (instrumental)			5:05

CD (Limited edition)
No.	Title	Lyrics	Music	Length
1.	"Arakajime Ushinawareta Bokura no Ballad" (予め失われた僕らのバラッド Our Lost Ballads)	Nagae Kuwahara	Endo	5:13
2.	"Yummy Yummy Party"	CHI-MEY	CHI-MEY	4:22
3.	"Arakajime Ushinawareta Bokura no Ballad" (instrumental)			5:13
4.	"Yummy Yummy Party" (instrumental)			4:22

DVD (Limited edition)
No.	Title	Length
1.	"Arakajime Ushinawareta Bokura no Ballad" (music video)
2.	"Yummy Yummy Party" (cinemagraphs video)
3.	"Arakajime Ushinawareta Bokura no Ballad" (making video)

== Charts ==
Year	Chart	Peak position
2015	Oricon	29

== Release history ==
Region	Date	Label	Format	Catalog
Japan	5 October 2016	Evil Line Records	CD	KICM-1716
Japan	5 October 2016	Evil Line Records	CD+DVD	KICM-91715
