= Ikken Rakuchaku Goyoujin =

Single by Earphones

from the album Some Dreams
- Released: February 15, 2017
- Studio: King Sekiguchidai Studio
- Genre: J-pop
- Length: 4:41
- Label: Evil Line Records
- Songwriter: Natsumi Tadano (Lyrics) Masaru Yokoyama (Music)
- Producer: Soichiro Hirano

Earphones singles chronology
"Arakajime Ushinawareta Bokura no Ballad" (2016)	"Ikken Rakuchaku Goyoujin" (2017)	"Churata Churaha" (2019)

Music video
- "Ikken Rakuchaku Goyoujin" on YouTube

"Ikken Rakuchaku Goyoujin" (一件落着ゴ用心, Case Closed, Be Careful) is a song by Japanese voice actress idol unit Earphones. It was released on February 15, 2017, and was used as the opening for the anime, Akiba's Trip: The Animation. The song has spoken verses narrated by Akira Kushida. Ikken Rakuchaku Goyoujin and single's B-side, Utopia Monogatari were featured on their 2nd studio album, Some Dreams.

== Music video ==
The music video for "Ikken Rakuchaku Goyoujin" was directed by Pink ja Nakutemo. The video features Earphones performed with light stick and background of Akihabara. Akira Kushida also appears in the music video.

== Track listing ==
CD (Akiba's Trip:The Animation edition)
No.	Title	Lyrics	Music	Length
1.	"Ikken Rakuchaku Goyoujin" (一件落着ゴ用心 Case Closed, Be Careful)	Natsumi Tadano	Masaru Yokoyama	4:41
2.	"Utopia Monogatari" (理想郷物語 Utopia Story)	Takahiro Yamada	Takahiro Yamada	3:34
3.	"Iyahonzu no Sudara Bushi" (イヤホンズのスーダラ節 Sudara Bushi of Earphones)	Yukio Aoshima; Masumi Asano (drama part)	Hiroaki Hagiwara	5:53
4.	"Ikken Rakuchaku Goyoujin" (instrumental)			4:41
5.	"Utopia Monogatari" (instrumental)			3:34
6.	"Iyahonzu no Sudara Bushi" (instrumental)			3:53

CD (Earphones edition)
No.	Title	Lyrics	Music	Length
1.	"Ikken Rakuchaku Goyoujin" (一件落着ゴ用心 Case Closed, Be Careful)	Natsumi Tadano	Masaru Yokoyama	4:41
2.	"Utopia Monogatari" (理想郷物語 Utopia Story)	Takahiro Yamada	Takahiro Yamada
3.	"Ikken Rakuchaku Goyoujin" (instrumental)			4:41
4.	"Utopia Monogatari" (instrumental)			3:34

DVD (Earphones edition)
No.	Title	Length
1.	"Ikken Rakuchaku Goyoujin" (music video)
2.	"Ikken Rakuchaku Goyoujin" (making of)

== Charts ==
Year	Chart	Peak position
2015	Oricon	33
2015	Japan Hot 100	84
2015	Japan Hot Animation	20

== Release history ==
Region	Date	Label	Format	Catalog
Japan	15 February 2017	Evil Line Records	CD	KICM-1751
Japan	15 February 2017	Evil Line Records	CD+DVD	KIZM-471
