= Pretty Cure Dream Stars! =

2017 film by Hiroshi Miyamoto

- Theatrical release poster
- Kanji: 映画 プリキュアドリームスターズ!
- Revised Hepburn: Eiga Purikyua Dorīmu Sutāzu!
- Directed by: Hiroshi Miyamoto
- Screenplay by: Fumi Tsubota
- Based on: Pretty Cure by Izumi Todo
- Starring: Karen Miyama; Haruka Fukuhara; Tomo Muranaka; Saki Fujita; Nanako Mori; Mika Kanai; Rie Takahashi; Yui Horie; Saori Hayami; Ayaka Saitō; Yū Shimamura; Masumi Asano; Hibiku Yamamura; Miyuki Sawashiro; Nao Tōyama; Shiho Kokido; Kana Asumi; Yoshino Kimura; Ryota Yamasato
- Cinematography: Kenji Takahashi
- Edited by: Yoshihiro Aso
- Music by: Yuki Hayashi
- Production company: Toei Animation
- Distributed by: Toei Company, Ltd.
- Release date: March 18, 2017
- Running time: 70 minutes
- Country: Japan
- Language: Japanese

Pretty Cure Dream Stars! (Japanese: 映画プリキュアドリームスターズ！, Hepburn: Eiga Purikyua Dorīmu Sutāzu!) is a 2017 Japanese animated action fantasy film based on the Pretty Cure franchise created by Izumi Todo. The film is directed by Hiroshi Miyamoto, written by Fumi Tsubota and produced by Toei Animation. The film was released in Japan on March 18, 2017.

Marking the ninth entry in the Pretty Cure All Stars crossover film series, the Kirakira Pretty Cure a la Mode team joins Witchy Pretty Cure! and Go! Princess PreCure teams to help a girl named Sakura save her friend, Shizuku, and her home of Sakuragahara. It also marks the first film in the series to not be titled All Stars. The motif of the film is based on Japanese mythology, with wa as the main theme.

== Plot ==
After school, Ichika meets up with her friends for a picnic on a hill near a tree stump and tells them about her dream, in which a girl and her friend, a fox named Shizuku, are fleeing from Akainu and Kiinu. Shizuku gives Sakura three cards and tells her to look for the symbols on them to find help before pushing her through a portal, causing them to be separated as she arrives in Ichigozaka. Ichika then meets the girl from her dream, Sakura, who tries to take her cupcake after noticing that there is a pastry on one of the cards. However, before Ichika can ask her about its meaning, Akainu attacks them.

Ichika transforms into Cure Whip to fight it, and Sakura realizes that the cards' purpose is to find the Pretty Cure that the symbols on them represent. As she struggles to fight Akainu, Sakura wishes that she could help her, causing her Miracle Light, the Miracle Sakulight, to glow and open a door that she goes through, where she instructs the audience about the Miracle Lights. After the other Kirakira Cures arrive and help Whip defeat Akainu and revert it to its origami form, Sakura explains what happened and they theorize that what is happening to Sakuragahara is affecting the cherry blossoms in their world.

As the Cures search for the Cures of Keys and Jewels, Ichika, Himari and Aoi go to the Magical World, where they investigate Mofurun because of her jewel matching the symbol of a card. However, at the shopping district, Akainu sends a Yokubaru to attack them and the Mahou Girls Cures help them fight it. Meanwhile, Yukari and Akira go to Noble Academy, where the latter intimidates Yui Nanase, causing the Princess Pretty Cures to confront her. However, they team up with them to fight a Zetsuborg that Kiinu sends to attack them. After both teams and the monsters return to Ichigozaka, they work together to defeat them. Later, a mysterious girl named Samidare attempts to attack Sakura, but retreats after being reluctant to do so.

At the KiraKira Patisserie, while the Cures and Sakura have dinner and dessert, Sakura is saddened after remembering her and Shizuku's promise to see the cherry blossoms bloom. The Miracle Sakulight glows and forms a door at the tree stump, which Sakura opens for the Cures to enter Sakuragahara.

When they arrive, Akainu and Kiinu, who fuse into Ooinu, and Karasu Tengu, confront them and tell Sakura that they wanted to use her ability to open portals to travel to other worlds. As the Cures struggle to fight Ooinu, Samidare appears and turns the Cures into origami except for Whip and Sakura. Whip attacks Samidare, shattering half of her mask and revealing her eye, which Sakura recognizes as Shizuku's, and is shocked that she has turned evil. Whip is determined to save Shizuku, but Sakura is distraught that she no longer remembers her. However, Whip's vow to help her family and friends causes the Miracle Sakulight to glow and return Sakuragahara to normal. Sakura tries to get Samidare to remember her true form as Shizuku and gets through to her, shattering the mask completely and returning her to normal along with the Cures.

As the Cures fight Karasu Tengu, who has transformed into a more powerful form, they tell the audience to support them using the Miracle Lights. Sakura recalls how she used to be afraid, but has become braver since meeting the Cures, as she reaches the door and opens it with the Miracle Sakulight. The Cures guide a giant form of Whip made of Kirakiraru, and, with help from Sakura and Shizuku, who attack its weak spot, the nose, defeat Karasu Tengu. Afterwards, the Cures, along with Sakura and Shizuku, have a flower viewing, and Whip thanks Sakura for helping make her dream of viewing the flowers with her friends come true.

== Voice cast ==
Kirakira Pretty Cure a la Mode cast

- Karen Miyama as Ichika Usami/Cure Whip
- Haruka Fukuhara as Himari Arisugawa/Cure Custard
- Tomo Muranaka as Aoi Tategami/Cure Gelato
- Saki Fujita as Yukari Kotozume/Cure Macaron
- Nanako Mori as Akira Kenjo/Cure Chocolat
- Mika Kanai as Pekorin

Witchy Pretty Cure! cast

- Rie Takahashi as Mirai Asahina/Cure Miracle
- Yui Horie as Riko Izayoi/Cure Magical
- Saori Hayami as Kotoha Hanami/Cure Felice
- Ayaka Saitō as Mofurun
- Yūya Uchida as Headmaster
- Yoshino Ohtori as Head Teacher
- Masafumi Kimura as Gustav
- Yuto Suzuki as Todd

Go! Princess PreCure cast

- Yū Shimamura as Haruka Haruno/Cure Flora
- Masumi Asano as Minami Kaido/Cure Mermaid
- Hibiku Yamamura as Kirara Amanogawa/Cure Twinkle
- Miyuki Sawashiro as Towa Akagi/Cure Scarlet
- Nao Tōyama as Pafu
- Shiho Kokido as Aroma
- Haruka Yoshimura as Yui Nanase
- Arisa Kiyoto as Hitomi Segawa
- Haruno Inoue as Yoko Kanda
- Haruka Chisuga as Hanae Komori
- Kana Ueda as Riko Furuya
- Nao Tōyama as Sayaka Kano (uncredited)
- Rie Takahashi as Noble Academy School girl (uncredited)

Film characters

- Kana Asumi as Sakura (サクラ, Sakura), a mysterious girl from the world of Sakuragahara who possesses the Miracle Sakulight and searches for the Pretty Cures to help her defeat Karasutengu and save Shizuku and Sakuragahara.
- Yoshino Kimura as Shizuku (シズク, Shizuku), a blue fox and Sakura's friend. Karasutengu captured her when Sakura escaped to Earth and she was brainwashed to serve him, transforming into Samidare (五月雨, Samidare; lit. May Rain (in Japanese traditional calendar)) until Sakura gets through to her and returns her to normal. She has the power to turn enemies into origami.
- Ryota Yamasato as Karasu Tengu (鴉天狗, Karasu Tengu; lit. Crow Tengu), an evil being who attacked Sakuragahara to steal its beautiful things for himself and gain Sakura's power to travel to other worlds. He has mind control abilities.
- Tomohiro Sekimachi and Jin Tadokoro of comedy group Rice as Akainu (赤狗) and Kiinu (黄狗), two Shisa dogs who serve under Karasu Tengu and can fuse into Oinu, a purple Shisa dog.

== Production ==
The film was announced after the screening of Witchy Pretty Cure! The Movie: Wonderous! Cure Mofurun!, with the official website opened at October 29, 2016. The film is hinted as a film that is "not an All Stars" film and will start a fresh new storyline away from the previous crossover series. Similar to All Stars, the film is a non-canonical crossover between series, specifically Go! Princess PreCure, Witchy PreCure! and Kirakira Pretty Cure a la Mode alongside two new characters made for the film. In addition, producer Takashi Washio stated that only three current Pretty Cure teams will be used due to the film's focus on the most current generation teams rather than relying on using the previous generation, a problem encountered while producing the All Stars movies.

In addition of the film being animated in traditional animation, the film also featured 3D Cel-Shaded backgrounds and animation, similar to what was shown in Go! Princess PreCure the Movie: Splendid! Triple Feature! The 3D scenes in the film were modeled closely to Japanese shrines and locations to give a more distinct feel than the previous films. While discussing the film's theme, Washio said Japanese mythology and the term "Wa" (和; "Harmony") were chosen, which he stated was a very difficult theme to work with due to concerns that "it may distance the film away from children". However, its theme can also reveal the beauty and depth of Japanese culture, and hopefully it will be received well with children, alongside other themes from previous films. The movie also shares similarities with Kado: the Right Answer. Another Toei CGI Anime with same animation style from Dream Stars!.

=== Music ===
The film's score was composed by Yuki Hayashi. The film's opening theme is titled "Sakura Mission ~Pretty Cure Relation~" (桜MISSION〜プリキュアリレーション〜, Sakura Misshon ~Purikyua Rirēshon~) by Rie Kitagawa while the ending song is titled "Kimi o Yobu Basho" (君を呼ぶ場所, Kimi o Yobu Basho; "The Places to Call You") by Yoshino Kimura. The single charted at #58 in the Oricon Singles Chart and #63 in the Billboard Japan Top Singles Sales chart

== Release and promotion ==
The film debuted in Japanese theaters on March 18, 2017. Moviegoers were given a "Miracle Sakulight" for participation. To promote the film, animal sweets were distributed to those that preorded the movie tickets.

Kimura appeared on Music Station performing "Kimi o Yobu Basho", described as a "medium tempo ballad" by Oricon; this was her first appearance on the program in sixteen years

== Reception ==
=== Box office ===
The film debuted at 5th place on its opening weekend on March 18–19, beating Kuroko's Basketball The Movie: Last Game which debuted at the same week. On its opening week, it earned a total of 158 million yen on 135,000 audience admissions. It later fell to 10th place. Toei's sales target of the film is 700 million yen. The film received a 92.0 rating from Pia's first-day satisfaction survey, ranking at third place. By March 25–26, it drops to 10th place.
