= Katie Chonacas =

American actress

- Born: Katie Chonacas; Detroit, Michigan
- Occupation: Actress
- Years active: 1990-Present

Katie Chonacas is an American actress.

Chonacas was born in Detroit, Michigan. After moving to Los Angeles in 2002 she landed roles on television series including CSI: NY, It's Always Sunny in Philadelphia, Cold Case and CSI: Crime Scene Investigation. She had supporting roles in Major Movie Star as Amber, Thick as Thieves as June, and Bad Lieutenant: Port of Call New Orleans as Tina.

== Career ==
Chonacas moved to Los Angeles, California in 2002, where her acting career began. She landed roles on television series such as CBS's CSI: New York and FX Network's It's Always Sunny in Philadelphia. She also excelled in film as she booked supporting roles in the films Major Movie Star starring Jessica Simpson and The Code starring Morgan Freeman and Antonio Banderas. She also shared a passionate scene with Nicolas Cage in Bad Lieutenant: Port of Call New Orleans directed by Werner Herzog, who hand-selected Katie Chonacas for the role. She has also starred in several major music videos. Her first lead in a music video was playing a young hippie in the Chemical Brothers song The Golden Path. She was chosen out of a large Los Angeles talent pool to be the lead in Pink's music video Who Knew, directed by Dragon. She was also featured wearing Gucci in Hilary Duff's music video Stranger.

== Influences ==
One of Chonacas' mentors is long-time friend Steve Valentine, whom she met on her first acting gig on the Universal Studios lot for the NBC TV show Crossing Jordan, on which Valentine starred. Chonacas is a frequent collaborator with David Christopher Lee.
