= Earphones (band) =

Seiyū vocalist group

Earphones イヤホンズ
- Origin: Japan
- Genres: J-pop; bubblegum pop
- Years active: 2015–present
- Labels: Evil Line Records
- Members: Marika Kouno; Rie Takahashi; Yuki Nagaku
- Website: earphones-official.com

Earphones (イヤホンズ, Iyahonzu) is a Japanese idol group formed in 2015. The members of the group are Rie Takahashi, Yuki Nagaku, and Marika Kouno under Evil Line Records label. Originally, a fictitious idol group consisting of three main characters from the anime Seiyu's Life!, Earphones soon became a real idol group, its three members the voice actresses responsible for their respective characters in the anime.

== Members ==
Name	Nickname	Color	Birth date	Position	Agency
Marika Kouno	Marinka	Blue	February 22	Noise Beauty	Aoni Production
Rie Takahashi	Rieri	Yellow	February 27	Sister Leader	81 Produce
Yuki Nagaku	Gakkyu	Pink	April 8	Strawberry Princess	Aoni Production

== Discography ==
=== Albums ===
==== Studio albums ====
Year	Album details	Peak chart positions	
Year	Album details	Oricon Weekly	Billboard Japan
2015	Miracle Mystery Tour: Released: November 21, 2015; Label: Evil Line Records (KICS-93325, KICS-3325); Format: CD, CD+DVD	55	—
2018	Some Dreams: Released: March 14, 2018; Label: Evil Line Records (KICS-93684, KICS-3684, NKZC-20～21); Format: CD, 2CD, CD+BD	22	48
2020	Theory of evolution: Released: July 22, 2020; Label: Evil Line Records (KICS-93923, KICS-3923, ECB-997); Format: CD, 2CD, 2CD+DVD	16	27
2024	Tegami: Released: February 14, 2024; Label: Evil Line Records; Format: CD, CD+Blu-ray		

==== Extended plays ====
Year	Album details
2021	identity: Released: September 22, 2021; Label: Evil Line Records (KIZX-499, NKZX-5); Format: CD+Blu-ray

=== Singles ===
Year	Title	Peak chart position		Release date	Album
Year	Title	Oricon Weekly Singles Chart	Billboard Japan	Release date	Album
2015	"Mimi no Naka e" (耳の中へ, Into Your Ears)	29	—	June 18, 2015	Miracle Mystery Tour
2015	"Sore ga Seiyuu!" (それが声優！, That is a Voice Actor!)	36	85	July 22, 2015	Miracle Mystery Tour
2015	"Hikari no Saki e" (光の先へ, Beyond the Light)	34	—	September 30, 2015	Miracle Mystery Tour
2016	"Arakajime Ushinawareta Bokura no Ballad" (予め失われた僕らのバラッド, Our Lost Ballads)	29	—	October 5, 2016	Some Dreams
2017	"Ikken Rakuchaku Goyoujin" (一件落着ゴ用心, Case Closed, Be Careful)	33	84	February 15, 2017	Some Dreams
2019	"Churata Churaha" (チュラタ チュラハ)	27	—	July 3, 2019	Theory of evolution

=== Videos ===
==== Video albums ====
Year	Video details	Peak chart positions	
Year	Video details	Oricon DVD	Oricon Blu-ray
2016	Earphones vs Aice5 -Sore ga Unit!- NHK hōru kōen: Release date: 23 March 2016; Format: DVD (KIBM-571～2), Blu-ray (KIXM-232)	182	34
2016	Tokyo Seiyu Asayake Monogatari Live: Release date: 21 December 2016; Format: DVD (KIBM-616), Blu-ray (KIXM-90261)	—	214

=== Music videos ===
Year	Title	Director(s)
2015	"Sore ga Seiyuu!"	
2015	"Seichō! Zenryoku Cinderella"	
2016	"Genshō no Blade"	
2016	"Arakajime Ushinawareta Bokura no Ballad"	Pink ja Nakutemo
2016	"Yummy Yummy Party"	Pink ja Nakutemo
2016	"Yorokobi no Uta (lyrics video)"	Pink ja Nakutemo
2017	"Ikken Rakuchaku Goyoujin"	Pink ja Nakutemo
2018	"Shinjigen Kouro"	Pink ja Nakutemo
2018	"Atashi no Naka no Monogatari (lyrics video)"	Pink ja Nakutemo
2018	"Wagamama Allegory"	Pink ja Nakutemo
2019	"Churata Churaha"	Pink ja Nakutemo
2020	"Kioku"	Pink ja Nakutemo
