= Rie Takahashi =

Japanese voice actress and singer (born 1994)

- 高橋 李依
- Born: February 27, 1994 (age 32); Kashiwa, Chiba Prefecture, Japan
- Education: Koshigaya-Minami High School
- Occupations: Voice actress; singer
- Years active: 2013–present
- Agent: 81 Produce
- Musical career
- Genres: J-pop; anison
- Instrument: Vocals
- Years active: 2014–present
- Label: A-Sketch
- Website: taka8rie.com

Japanese name
- Kanji: 高橋 李依
- Kana: たかはし りえ
Transcriptions
- Romanization: Takahashi Rie

Rie Takahashi (Japanese: 高橋 李依, Hepburn: Takahashi Rie; born February 27, 1994) is a Japanese voice actress and singer affiliated with 81 Produce. A member of the musical unit Earphones, she has voicing the leading roles in several series, including Futaba Ichinose in Seiyu's Life!, Megumin in KonoSuba, Emilia and Satella in Re:Zero − Starting Life in Another World, Takagi in Teasing Master Takagi-san, Mash Kyrielight in Fate/Grand Order, Mirai Asahina/Cure Miracle in Witchy Pretty Cure!, Yuzuriha in Hell's Paradise: Jigokuraku, Sumi Sakurasawa in Rent-A-Girlfriend, Anzu Hoshino in Romantic Killer, Ai Hoshino in Oshi no Ko, Tomo Aizawa in Tomo-chan Is a Girl!, Iku Sutō in The 100 Girlfriends Who Really, Really, Really, Really, Really Love You, and Ouka Shiunji in The Shiunji Family Children. She won the Best Female Newcomer at the 10th Seiyu Awards.

== Biography ==
Takahashi was born in Kashiwa, Chiba Prefecture, and raised in Saitama Prefecture. She watched Ojamajo Doremi, and Soul Eater, while in high school. She noticed that some voice actresses have played each male characters, as this fact interested her. She decided to pursue a career in voice acting. She joined the broadcasting club during her third year of high school, and won a special citation for voice acting at the 4th High School Animation Fair. During her third year of high school, Takahashi participated in an audition sponsored by the voice acting agency 81 Produce. After graduating from Koshigaya-Minami High School, she attended 81 Produce's training school, 81 Actor's Studio. While taking lessons, she became part of the voice actor unit Anisoni∀, alongside Reina Ueda, Chiyeri Hayashida, and Kayoto Tsumita. After graduating from the 81 Actor's Studio in 2013, she joined 81 Produce. She had a part-time job at the supermarket and a bra factory.

In 2013, she played background or supporting roles in each series, such as Stella Women's Academy, High School Division Class C3, Driland, and Aikatsu!. She also played the role of a student in a voiced comic stream of the online manga Pokémon Card Game XY: Yarouze!. In 2015, she had a leading role in the anime series Seiyu's Life!. Takahashi, Marika Kouno, and Yuki Nagaku, formed the musical unit Earphones. Takahashi voiced Miki Naoki in School-Live! and Kaon Lanchester in Comet Lucifer. She and fellow School-Live! co-stars, Inori Minase, Ari Ozawa, and Mao Ichimichi, performed the series' opening theme "Friend Shitai" (ふ・れ・ん・ど・し・た・い, I Want to be Friends). Takahashi won the Best Newcomer Award at the 10th Seiyu Awards. She was cast as the character Megumin in the anime series KonoSuba. Takahashi, Sora Amamiya, and Ai Kayano performed the series' closing theme "Chiisana Boukensha" (ちいさな冒険者, Little Adventurer). She also voiced Noct Leaflet in Undefeated Bahamut Chronicle, OL in Digimon Universe: Appli Monsters, Mirai Asahina in Maho Girls PreCure!, Code Omega 00 Yufilia in Ange Vierge, and Emilia in Re:Zero − Starting Life in Another World. Takahashi performed the series' second closing theme "Stay Alive". She voiced Mash Kyrielight in the mobile phone game Fate/Grand Order, replacing Risa Taneda who went on a hiatus earlier that year. In 2017, Takahashi reprised the role for the second season of KonoSuba, where she, Amamiya, and Kayano performed the series' closing theme "Ouchi ni Kaeritai" (おうちに帰りたい, I Wanna Go Home). She played Aqua Aino in Love Tyrant, and Ernesti Echevarria in Knight's & Magic. She starred in the anime series Teasing Master Takagi-san, where she performed the series' ending themes. She voiced Tsubasa Katsuki in Comic Girls, Sagiri Ameno in Yuuna and the Haunted Hot Springs, and Nozomi Makino in Magical Girl Spec-Ops Asuka. For the second season of Teasing Master Takagi-san, she performed the series' closing themes.

In February 2021, Takahashi announced her debut as a solo singer under A-Sketch/Astro Voice on April, along with the launch of her official fanclub, "Takaharitsu Riekoukou" (たかは私立りえ高校). Her debut album Tōmei na Fusen (透明な付箋) was released on June 23, 2021. She won the Best Supporting Actress Award at the 16th Seiyu Awards.

In April 2025, 81 Produce announced that Takahashi would be taking a break for a month to undergo surgery for a vocal cord nodule.

== Filmography ==
=== Anime series ===
Year	Title	Role	Notes
2013	Stella Women's Academy, High School Division Class C3	Girl C	Debut role
2013	Voice Actor Squadron Voicetorm 7	Kosu's friend, Female student	
2013	Tanken Driland	Hiba Nitoukomachi	
2013	Pretty Rhythm: Rainbow Live	Costumer 2	episode 29
2014	Aikatsu!	Nagisa Tsutsumi	episode 83
2014	Kamigami no Asobi	Student A	
2014	Cardfight!! Vanguard: Legion Mate	Nicola, Boy B	
2014	Captain Earth	Ayana Aizawa	
2014	Norisuta!	Chocola	
2014	Your Lie in April	Audience	
2014	Kotorisanba de Aiueo	Chocola	
2014	Shirobako	Uchida, Mixing assistant, Student, Actor 1, Co-worker, Sakuma	
2014	Celestial Method	Student	
2014	A Good Librarian Like a Good Shepherd	Schoolgirl D, Officer 1	
2014	Maken-ki!	Asuka	
2014	Yowamushi Pedal	Announcer	
2015	Go! Princess PreCure	Schoolgirl	
2015	Cardfight!! Vanguard G	High school girl	
2015	Maria the Virgin Witch	Dorothy	
2015	Yowamushi Pedal GRANDE ROAD	Hiro's girlfriend, Audience, Elementary school player	
2015	JoJo's Bizarre Adventure: Stardust Crusaders	Girl B	
2015	Magical Girl Lyrical Nanoha ViVid	Linda, Yuna Purattsu	
2015	Seiyu's Life!	Futaba Ichinose, Korori-chan	
2015	Rampo Kitan: Game of Laplace	Kobayashi	
2015	School-Live!	Miki Naoki	
2015	Comet Lucifer	Kaon Lanchester	
2016	Undefeated Bahamut Chronicle	Noct Leaflet	
2016	KonoSuba	Megumin	
2016	Witchy Pretty Cure!	Mirai Asahina / Cure Miracle	
2016	Re:Zero − Starting Life in Another World	Emilia	
2016	The Asterisk War 2nd Season	Elliot Forster	
2016	Ange Vierge	Code Omega 00 Yufiria	
2016	Alderamin on the Sky	Nanaku Daru	
2016	Magi: Adventure of Sinbad	Hinahoho's cousin	
2016	Keijo	Rin Rokudō	
2016	Digimon Universe: Appli Monsters	OL	
2017	KonoSuba Season 2	Megumin	
2017	Akiba's Trip: The Animation	Matome Mayonaka, Urame Mayonaka	
2017	Love Tyrant	Aqua Aino	
2017	Knight's & Magic	Ernesti Echevarria	
2017	Battle Girl High School	Misaki	
2017	Girls' Last Tour	Female B student	
2017	Anime-Gatari	Yui Obata	
2018	Teasing Master Takagi-san	Takagi	
2018	Laid-Back Camp	Ena Saitō	
2018	Death March to the Parallel World Rhapsody	Zena Marienteil	
2018	Comic Girls	Tsubasa Katsuki	
2018	Caligula	Mifue Shinohara	
2018	Sirius the Jaeger	Ryoko Naoe	
2018	Yuuna and the Haunted Hot Springs	Sagiri Ameno	
2018	One Room Second Season	Minori Nanahashi	
2018	Million Arthur	Titania	
2018	Inazuma Eleven: Ares	Anna Mikado	
2019	Revisions	Chang Lu Steiner	
2019	Magical Girl Spec-Ops Asuka	Nozomi Makino	
2019	Million Arthur 2nd Season	Titania	
2019	Isekai Quartet	Megumin, Emilia	
2019	Magical Sempai	Madara-san	
2019	Wasteful Days of High School Girls	Kanade "Majime" Ninomae	
2019	Teasing Master Takagi-san 2	Takagi	
2019	Isekai Cheat Magician	Rin Azuma	
2019	Fate/Grand Order - Absolute Demonic Front: Babylonia	Mash Kyrielight	
2019	Tenka Hyakken ~Meiji-kan e Yōkoso!~	Kuwanagō	
2020	Room Camp	Ena Saitō	
2020	Kakushigoto	Hime Gotō	
2020	Princess Connect! Re:Dive	Ameth	
2020	Listeners	μ	
2020	Re:Zero − Starting Life in Another World 2nd Season	Emilia, Satella	
2020	Rent-A-Girlfriend	Sumi Sakurasawa	
2020	Assault Lily Bouquet	Shiori Rokkaku	
2020	One Room Third Season	Minori Nanahashi	
2021	Laid-Back Camp: Season 2	Ena Saitō	
2021	Girlfriend, Girlfriend	Shino Kiryū	
2021	Remake Our Life!	Ayaka Minori	
2021	Muteking the Dancing Hero	Aida-san	
2021	Dragon Quest: The Adventure of Dai	Flora	
2021	Ancient Girl's Frame	Reika Minamiya	
2022	Orient	Tsugumi Hattori	
2022	Teasing Master Takagi-san 3	Takagi	
2022	The Genius Prince's Guide to Raising a Nation Out of Debt	Ninym Ralei	
2022	Insect Land	Eden	
2022	Estab-Life: Great Escape	Feresu	
2022	Rent-A-Girlfriend Season 2	Sumi Sakurasawa	
2022	Classroom of the Elite	Hiyori Shiina	
2022	The Maid I Hired Recently Is Mysterious	Lilith	
2022	I'm the Villainess, So I'm Taming the Final Boss	Aileen Lauren d'Autriche	
2022	Beast Tamer	Stella	
2022	Love Flops	Ilya Ilyukhin	
2023	Tomo-chan Is a Girl!	Tomo Aizawa	
2023	Sugar Apple Fairy Tale	Mythril Lid Pod	
2023	High Card	Sugar Peas	
2023	Kaina of the Great Snow Sea	Liliha	
2023	Urusei Yatsura	Pepper	
2023	Chibi Godzilla Raids Again	Chibi Mothra	
2023	Hell's Paradise: Jigokuraku	Yuzuriha	
2023	KamiKatsu	Dakini	
2023	KonoSuba: An Explosion on This Wonderful World!	Megumin	
2023	A Galaxy Next Door	Chihiro Ibusuki	
2023	Oshi no Ko	Ai Hoshino	
2023	Rurouni Kenshin	Kamiya Kaoru	
2023	Rent-A-Girlfriend Season 3	Sumi Sakurasawa	
2023	Girlfriend, Girlfriend 2nd Season	Shino Kiryū	
2023	The Kingdoms of Ruin	Anna	
2023	Tearmoon Empire	Chloe Forkroad	
2023	Zenryoku Usagi	Young Lady	
2024	Ishura	Nihilo the Vortical Stampede	
2024	Delicious in Dungeon	Rinsha	
2024	Sasaki and Peeps	Hoshizaki-san	
2024	Snack Basue	Akemi	
2024	Laid-Back Camp: Season 3	Ena Saitō	
2024	Jellyfish Can't Swim in the Night	Kano Yamanouchi	
2024	KonoSuba Season 3	Megumin	
2024	Mysterious Disappearances	Shizuku	
2024	I Was Reincarnated as the 7th Prince so I Can Take My Time Perfecting My Magical Ability	Ren	
2024	The Café Terrace and Its Goddesses 2nd Season	Mao Takasaki	
2024	Quality Assurance in Another World	Akira	
2024	Our Last Crusade or the Rise of a New World Season II	Alek Hydra	
2024	I'll Become a Villainess Who Goes Down in History	Jill	
2024	Shangri-La Frontier 2nd Season	Rust	
2025	Honey Lemon Soda	Serina Kanno	
2025	I May Be a Guild Receptionist, But I'll Solo Any Boss to Clock Out on Time	Alina Clover	
2025	The 100 Girlfriends Who Really, Really, Really, Really, Really Love You 2nd Season	Iku Sutō	
2025	Witchy Pretty Cure!! Mirai Days	Mirai Asahina / Cure Miracle	
2025	The Shiunji Family Children	Ouka Shiunji	
2025	Witch Watch	Kara Minami	
2025	Blue Miburo	Sakura	
2025	Yano-kun's Ordinary Days	Izumi	
2026	Akane-banashi	Hikaru Koragi	
2026	Hanaori-san Still Wants to Fight in the Next Life	Ayahime Takanashi	
2026	I Want to Love You Till Your Dying Day	Sheena Totsuki	
2026	The Oblivious Saint Can't Contain Her Power	Carolina	
2026	Vertex Force	Yoko Nishina	
2026	Magic Knight Rayearth	Fuu Hououji	
2027	Within the Villainess	Emi	
2027	King's Proposal	Saika Kuozaki	

=== Original net animation ===
Year	Title	Role
2016	Monster Strike	Akane Noda
2021	Tawawa on Monday 2	Maegami
2021	Gundam Breaker Battlogue	Sana Miyama
2022	Kakegurui Twin	Sakura Miharutaki
2022	Romantic Killer	Anzu Hoshino
2023	Fate/Grand Order: Fujimaru Ritsuka Doesn't Get It (2023–present)	Mash Kyrielight
2023	Good Night World	Hana Kamuro
2023	Pluto	Mine
2026	Steel Ball Run: JoJo's Bizarre Adventure	Lucy Steel

=== Original video animation ===
Year	Title	Role
2015	Your Lie in April	Setsuko
2015	Shirobako – The Third Girls Aerial Squad OVA	Announcer
2016	KonoSuba – OVA	Megumin
2017	KonoSuba 2 – OVA	Megumin
2018	Teasing Master Takagi-san – OVA	Takagi
2018	Re:Zero − Starting Life in Another World - Memory Snow	Emilia
2021	The Girl from the Other Side: Siúil, a Rún	Shiva

=== Anime films ===
Year	Title	Role	Note
2015	The Anthem of the Heart	Yōko Uno	
2016	Pretty Cure All Stars: Singing with Everyone Miraculous Magic!	Mirai Asahina / Cure Miracle	
2016	Witchy Pretty Cure! The Movie: Wonderous! Cure Mofurun!	Mirai Asahina / Cure Miracle	
2017	Pretty Cure Dream Stars!	Mirai Asahina / Cure Miracle	
2017	Kirakira Pretty Cure a la Mode the Movie: Crisply! The Memory of Mille-feuille!	Mirai Asahina / Cure Miracle	
2018	Bungo Stray Dogs: Dead Apple	Mizuki Tsujimura	
2018	Pretty Cure Super Stars!	Mirai Asahina / Cure Miracle	
2018	Hug! Pretty Cure Futari wa Pretty Cure: All Stars Memories	Mirai Asahina / Cure Miracle	
2019	Pretty Cure Miracle Universe	Mirai Asahina / Cure Miracle	
2019	KonoSuba: God's Blessing on this Wonderful World! Legend of Crimson	Megumin	
2019	Re:ZERO -Starting Life in Another World- The Frozen Bond	Emilia	
2020	Fate/Grand Order: Camelot - Wandering; Agaterám	Mash Kyrielight	
2021	Pretty Guardian Sailor Moon Eternal The Movie	VesVes / Sailor Vesta	2-Part Film, Season 4 of Sailor Moon Crystal (Dead Moon arc)
2021	Fate/Grand Order Final Singularity - Grand Temple of Time: Solomon	Mash Kyrielight	
2022	Blue Thermal	Kaori Mochida	
2022	Teasing Master Takagi-san: The Movie	Takagi	
2022	Laid-Back Camp Movie	Ena Saitō	
2023	Pretty Guardian Sailor Moon Cosmos The Movie	Sailor Vesta	2-Part Film, Season 5 of Sailor Moon Crystal (Shadow Galactica arc)
2023	Pretty Cure All Stars F	Mirai Asahina / Cure Miracle	
2024	Iris the Movie: Full Energy!!	Shiro Risu	
2024	Ganbatte Ikimasshoi	Riina Takahashi	
2024	Wonderful Pretty Cure! The Movie: A Grand Adventure in a Thrilling Game World!	Mirai Asahina / Cure Miracle	
2025	100 Meters	Asakusa	
2025	Whoever Steals This Book	Shiori Haruta	
2026	You, Fireworks, and Our Promise	Haru	

=== Video games ===
Year	Title	Role
2014	Ar Nosurge	Tatoria
2015	Future Card Buddyfight	Yuki Tendo
2016	Fate/Grand Order	Mash Kyrielight
2016	Granblue Fantasy	Erin, Payila
2016	Shadowverse	Crystallia Aerin, Sibyl of the Waterwyrm
2016	The Caligula Effect	Mifue Shinohara
2016	Girls' Frontline	OTs-44, Elisa
2016	Mary Skelter: Nightmares	Thumbelina
2017	The Idolmaster Stella Stage	Shika
2017	Azur Lane	USS Massachusetts (BB-59), USS Montpelier (CL-57)
2017	Gran Turismo Sport	Narration (Japanese version)
2017	Tenka Hyakken	Kuwanagou
2017	Magia Record: Puella Magi Madoka Magica Side Story	Sasara Minagi
2017	Destiny Child	Aria
2017	Project Tokyo Dolls	Kana Minamida
2017	Radiant Historia: Perfect Chronology	Eruca
2018	Kirby Star Allies	Flamberge
2018	Final Fantasy XV	Y'hjimei
2018	Fire Emblem Heroes	Fjorm
2018	Brave Nine	Angelica
2018	Shin Megami Tensei: Liberation Dx2	Ririn Ueda
2018	Epic Seven	Luluca, Top Model Luluca
2018	Bombergirl	Kuro
2019	Dragalia Lost	Fjorm, Ilia
2019	Torikago Scrap March	Protagonist
2019	Dragon Quest Rivals	Foz
2019	KonoSuba: God's Blessing on this Wonderful World! Fantastic Days	Megumin
2019	Pokémon Masters EX	Dawn
2019	Date A Live: Ren Dystopia	Ren
2019	Arknights	Nightmare, Perfumer
2019	The Seven Deadly Sins: Grand Cross	Emila, Thonar/Thor
2020	Higurashi No Naku Koro Ni Mei	Nao Houtani
2021	Genshin Impact	Hu Tao
2021	Atelier Sophie 2: The Alchemist of the Mysterious Dream	Ramizel Erlenmeyer
2021	Grand Summoners	Cestina
2021	Alchemy Stars	Jane, Noah
2021	Monster Hunter Stories 2	Tsukino
2021	That Time I Got Reincarnated as a Slime: ISEKAI Memories	Izis
2022	Fragment's Note+	Yukitsuki Asaka
2022	Touhou Arcadia Record	Usami Sumireko
2022	Tower of Fantasy	Huma
2022	Star Ocean: The Divine Force	Nina Deforges
2022	Goddess of Victory: Nikke	Diesel
2023	Towa Tsugai	Suzume
2023	404 Game Re:set	Dig Dug
2023	Persona 5 Tactica	Elle
2024	Strinova	Kokona
2026	Nekopara: Sekai Connect	Bavarois
TBA	Goblin Slayer Another Adventurer: Nightmare Feast	Guild Master

=== Live-action ===
Year	Title	Role	Notes	Ref.
2022	Anime Supremacy!	Mitsuri (voice)	Film	
2025	Queen of Mars	Moby / narrator	Miniseries	

== Dubbing roles ==
=== Animation ===
Title	Role	Notes	Ref.
Adventure Time: Distant Lands	Young Pep		
Paw Patrol: The Mighty Movie	Tot		
Regular Show	CJ		
Spider-Man: Into the Spider-Verse	Peni Parker / SP//dr		
The Stolen Princess	Mila		
Young Justice	Wonder Girl		

=== Live action ===
Title	Role	Notes	Ref.
Ant-Man and the Wasp: Quantumania	Cassie Lang		
Avengers: Doomsday	Cassie Lang		
Kamen Rider The Winter Movie: Gotchard & Geats Strongest Chemy★Great Gotcha Operation	X Wizard		
Godzilla x Kong: The New Empire	Jayne		

== Discography ==
=== Singles ===
Song(s)	Details	Catalog no.		Oricon		Album
Song(s)	Details	Regular edition	Limited edition	Peak position	Weeks charted	Album
U-utsu (U撃つ)	Released: April 6, 2021; Label: A-Sketch; Format: DL; Girl Gun Lady opening theme	—N/a		—N/a		Tо̄mei na Fusen
Kyо̄kan Sarenakute mo Ii Janai (共感されなくてもいいじゃない)	Released: October 7, 2022; Label: A-Sketch; Format: DL; I'm the Villainess, So I'm Taming the Final Boss opening theme	—N/a		—N/a		Ao wo Ikiru

=== Extended plays ===
Title	EP details	Catalog no.		Oricon	
Title	EP details	Regular edition	Limited edition	Peak position	Weeks charted
Tо̄mei na Fusen (透明な付箋)	Released: June 23, 2021; Label: A-Sketch; Format: CD, DVD, DL	AZCS-1100	AZZS-117	18	2
Ao wo Ikiru (青を生きる)	Released: January 25, 2023; Label: A-Sketch; Format: CD, DVD, DL	AZCS-1111	AZZS-133	21	3
"—" denotes releases that did not chart or were not released.
