= Paydin LoPachin =

American actress (born 1988)

- Born: Paydin Layne LoPachin; January 18, 1988 (age 38); Abilene, Texas, USA
- Occupation: Actress
- Years active: 1995–present

Paydin LoPachin (January 18, 1988) is an American,actress born in Abilene, Texas.

== Career ==
Paydin's first film appearance was in The Stars Fell on Henrietta playing a farm girl. Her next appearances in film and television began in 2004 with an episode of the television series The O.C.. In 2006 she was in All the King's Men, House at the End of the Drive and an episode of Heroes, followed in 2007 by an appearance in Cold Case.

In 2008 Paydin had a small role in the Robert De Niro film What Just Happened and roles in the horror films Shark Swarm and Triloquist. It was for her starring role in critically panned Triloquist that film reviewers made note of her performance as the character Angelina. This was followed in 2009 by Spring Breakdown where she played the role of Young Senator Hartman.

== Reception ==
In their review, Dread Central approved of her performance as Angelique in Triloquist, writing "Paydin LoPachin plays bitchy psycho blonde Angelique like Kelly Bundy and Juliette Lewis from Natural Born Killers... ...She carries herself with much aplomb.. ...mechanizations seem almost stream of consciousness..." Horror Society wrote "Paydin LoPachin was also a standout as the psycho sister, driven to succeed in show business. She’s one of the more intriguing female horror leads I’ve seen in sometime". Conversely, her work was panned by John Shelton of Bloody Good Horror who wrote "The acting is mostly awful, particularly from Payden LoPachin, who as Angelina manages to get out-acted by a foam puppet". In their complaint that the film was full of "teases", Peter Brown if iFMagazine wrote "it is a film filled with teases. The main character, Angelina (Paydin LoPachin), talks a good game... ...but we never see the goods", "... I suppose that having a foul mouthed, hot chick talking about her body and asking over and over again for people to f**k her may seem like a comical exchange... ...but after 10 minutes of it what’s the point" "...the hot chick that never shows the goods is actually damn annoying after 10 minutes.

== Filmography ==
- Spring Breakdown (2009)
- Triloquist (2008)
- Shark Swarm (2008) (TV)
- What Just Happened (2008)
- Cold Case (2007) (TV)
- Heroes (2006) (TV)
- House at the End of the Drive (2006)
- The O.C. (2004) (TV)
- The Stars Fell on Henrietta (1995)

== Awards and acknowledgments ==
Paydin composes piano music—her composition "Caught in a Dream" won first place in a state competition and third place in a national competition.
