= France Five =

- Opening title card
- Also known as: Shin Kenjūshi France Five
- Genre: Tokusatsu superhero
- Created by: Buki X-4 Productions
- Starring: Sébastien Ruchet; Grégory Goldberg; Daniel Andréyev; Thomas Blumberg; Wendy Roeltgen; Nolwenn Daste; Grégoire Hellot
- Opening theme: "Shin Kenjūshi France Five" by Akira Kushida
- Country of origin: France
- No. of episodes: 6

Production
- Running time: 30–40 minutes

Original release
- Release: April 21, 2000 – April 12, 2013

France Five (フランスファイブ, Furansu Faibu), originally titled Jūshi Sentai France Five (銃士戦隊フランスファイブ, Jūshi Sentai Furansu Faibu; translated as Musketeers Squadron France Five) and later known as Shin Kenjūshi France Five (新剣銃士フランスファイブ, Shin Kenjūshi Furansu Faibu; translated as New Sword Musketeers France Five), is a French mini-series directed by Alex Pilot and produced by Buki X-4 Productions from 2000 to 2013 (with a hiatus between 2004 and 2012). It is an homage to Toei's popular Super Sentai series, which was extremely popular in France in the 1980s and the 1990s. As a nod to Super Sentai titles having certain motifs, France Five has each member themed after certain aspects of French culture.

There have been four half-hour episodes of France Five produced. The fifth episode aired on May 5, 2012, during a projection in Paris, and also premiered in June for Japan and the French television, Nolife, created by the creators of France Five. The episode includes a preview of the sixth and final episode.

This series is said to be a nod to another Sentai pastiche, Aikoku Sentai Dai-Nippon (Patriot Squadron Great Japan) (1982) by Daicon Films (now Gainax).

The series has become somewhat popular in Japan as well, with singer Akira Kushida singing an original theme for the series starting with episode 4. Prior to that point, the themes were French remixes of older Sentai theme songs (Choujin Sentai Jetman and Choudenshi Bioman) as well as an original French theme.

== Story ==
Glou Man Chou, ruler of the Lexos Empire, desires to conquer planet Earth. However, the Eiffel Tower generates a barrier around the planet that keeps him from sending his armies en masse. Glou Man Chou sends his warriors and monsters to Earth to destroy the tower and enable a full-scale invasion, but they are opposed by France Five.

In the fourth episode, the shield is disabled and Lexos's army is shown prepared to invade the planet. Professor Burgonde is captured and France Five go in hiding. In episode 5, France Five reappear to battle Lexos, but they are overpowered by Zakaral and his generals. After being freed from captivity by France Five and his robot assistant Margarine, Professor Burgonde initiates a top-secret program in France Five's system as a last-ditch effort to save them.

== Characters ==
=== France Five ===
France Five: (from left to right) Jean Pétri, Thierry Durand, Antoine Deschaumes (leader, centre), Albert Dumas, and Catherine Fontaine.

"En garde! Jūshi Sentai France Five!"/ "France Five!, En garde!"

- Antoine Deschaumes/Red Fromage: A skilled boxer and leader of France Five. A very patriotic person who takes his duty seriously, he hardly ever laughs.
- Thierry Durand/Black Beaujolais: The son of a rich winemaker in the Beaujolais region, he rejected his family heritage to live a rebellious life, which often clashes with Red Fromage's authority.
- Albert Dumas/Blue Accordéon: The son of a musician, he is the comic relief of the team.
- Jean Pétri/Yellow Baguette: A bread baker and the youngest member of the team.
- Catherine Fontaine/Pink à la Mode: A fashion model who is very critical of cleanliness, much to the team's dismay.
- Aramis Leclair/Silver Mousquetaire: The mysterious warrior in the tradition of the Super Sentai franchise's "sixth warriors". Aramis is also an old friend of Antoine. He died protecting Antoine from a laser shot in Episode 4, and his spirit reappears in Episode 6.

==== Allies ====
- Professor Aristide Burgonde: Creator of France Five's suits and mecha. He is an ethnologist, veterinarian and holds a degree in robotics. He secretly developed France Five in conjunction with the French Ministry of Defense.
- Margarine: Professor Burgonde's robot assistant. She was killed in Episode 6 by a piece of Antoine's broken sword thrown by Zakaral.
- Sylvie Dumas: A French tour guide who is Albert's sister.

==== Mecha ====
- Jet Charlemagne: Flying fortress, carries the Falcon D'Artagnan and the Joan of Arc Mont.
- Falcon D'Artagnan and Joan of Arc Mount: Vehicles that combine into the France-Robot. A new, standalone France Robot appears in the final episode.
- Machine Chanteclerc: Silver Mousquetaire's rooster mecha. In the final episode, it combines with the new France Robot into the Robot D'Artagnan.

=== The Lexos Empire ===
- Glou Man Chou: Emperor of the Lexos Empire. After destroying many planets, he has his sights set on Earth and sends his minions to destroy the Eiffel Tower and deactivate Earth's protective barrier for a full invasion.
- Extasy: One of Glou Man Chou's lieutenants, who takes pleasure in making her victims suffer. Extasy's true identity is Sophie Burgonde, Antoine's fiancée who was kidnapped by Warduke prior to the first episode.
- Warduke: A lieutenant with colossal strength and an insatiable lust for battle.
- Cancrelax: Glou Man Chou's cowardly chamberlain, who often shows sycophancy to the Emperor and blames Extasy and Warduke for every defeat at the hands of France Five. Whenever a Streum Monster is defeated by France Five, he casts a spell to revive and grow it to giant size. In episode 5, he evolves his physical form into Grand Crelax.
- Zakaral: Glou Man Chou's son and highest-ranked lieutenant.
- Gorlock: A burly brute armed with a giant hammer.
- Succulard: A bloodthirsty chef itching to paint his cleaver with the blood of his victims.
- Agony: A lizard-like warrior with remarkable agility.
- Lady Warcry: An Amazon warrior who is Warduke's daughter.
- Panous: The footsoldiers of the Lexos Empire.

==== Monsters ====
- Hypnostreum (1)
- Discostreum (2)
- Toxicostreum (3)
- Snypostreum (3 1/2)
- Pyrostreum (4)

== Episodes ==
1. "Hypnostreum's Attack! Don't Lose the Guide!" (L'attaque d'Hypnostreum. Ne perdez pas le guide !) (30 November 1999, released widely on 21 April 2000)
2. "Everyone on the Dance Floor! Discostreum Leads the Party" (Tous en piste! Discostreum mène le bal.) (10 November 2001)
3. "Cheating Isn't Fairplay! Toxicostreum Reverses the Rules" (Tricher n'est pas jouer! Toxicostreum renverse les règles !) (1 November 2002)
4. Episode 3 1/2 "Death in the Ring! In the Sights of Snipostreum!" (Mort sur le ring ! Dans la ligne de mire de Snipostreum!) (4 July 2019 in the Japan Expo, released on YouTube on 3 January 2020)
5. "Is Paris Burning? The Menace Is Named Zakaral" (Paris brûle-t-il? La menace s'appelle Zakaral.) (15 December 2004)
6. "The Day of Glory has arrived! Farewell France Five" (Adieu France Five! Le jour de gloire est arrivé.) (5 May 2012)
7. "This Time, It's the End! Antoine Faces His Destiny!" (Cette fois, c'est la fin ! Antoine face à son destin !) (12 April 2013)

== Cast ==
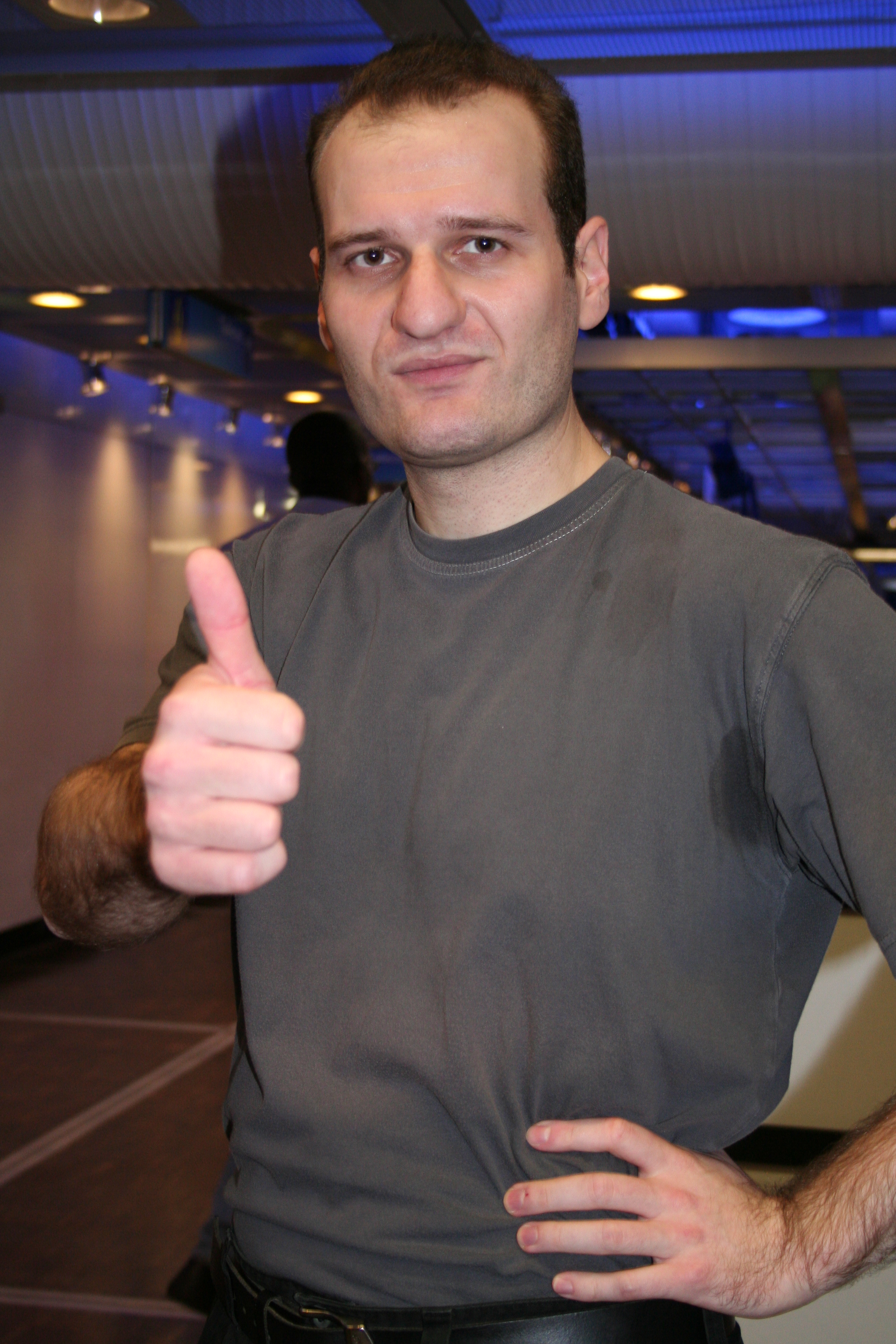
Grégory Goldberg in November 2006 during G.A.M.E. in Paris 3.

- Antoine Deschaumes: Sébastien Ruchet
- Thierry Durand: Grégory Goldberg
- Albert Dumas: Daniel Andréyev
- Jean Pétri: Thomas Blumberg
- Catherine Fontaine: Wendy Roeltgen (eps. 1–3); Nolwenn Daste (eps. 4–6)
- Aramis Leclair Grégoire Hellot
- Professor Aristide Burgonde: Tibor Clerdouet
- Margarine: Émilie Thoré; Clémence Perrot; Lætitia Girard
- Sylvie Dumas: Dorothée Leclére-Tardif
- Glou Man Chou: David Guélou
- Extasy: Nadège Bessaguet; Aurélie Maurice
- Warduke: Jean-Marc Imbert
- Cancrelax Olivier Fallaix
- Grand Crelax: Aurélien François
- Zakaral: Patrick Giordano
- Gorlock: Michel Toustou
- Succulard: Ruddy Pomarède
- Agony: Romanesque Ishitobi; Frédéric Hosteing
- Lady Warcry: Léna Desfontaines

=== Suit actors ===
- Red Fromage: Aurélien François
- Black Beaujolais: Grégory Goldberg
- Blue Accordéon: Yannick Beaupuis
- Yellow Baguette: Thien An Nguyen
- Pink à la Mode: Loan Trinh, Suzuka Asaoka
- Margarine: Suzuka Asaoka, Aurore Blaise
- Zakaral: Frédéric Hosteing
