= Masumi Asano =

Japanese voice actress

- 浅野 真澄
- Born: August 25, 1977 (age 49); Noshiro, Akita Prefecture, Japan
- Other name: Masumin
- Occupations: Voice actress; singer; narrator; writer
- Years active: 1999–present
- Agents: Arts Vision (1999–2007); Aoni Production (2007–2021); Freelance (2021– present)
- Notable credits: Aikatsu! as Saki Hashiba; Beelzebub as Pillar Agiel; Blood-C as Yūka Amino; D.N.Angel as Risa Harada; Gravion as Kaori Stephanie; Go! Princess PreCure as Minami Kaido/Cure Mermaid; He Is My Master as Izumi; Ikki Tousen as Hakufu Sonsaku; Spiral: The Bonds of Reasoning as Hiyono Yuizaki; Seiyu's Life! as herself
- Height: 163 cm (5 ft 4 in)
- Spouse: Kenjiro Hata
- Website: www.masumin.net

Masumi Asano (浅野 真澄, Asano Masumi; born August 25, 1977) is a Japanese voice actress, singer, narrator and writer who worked for Aoni Production, but now as of January, 2021, a Freelancer.

== Biography ==
Asano was born on August 25, 1977, in Noshiro, Akita and studied at the Kokugakuin University Faculty of Literature. Asano announced via her blog that her dōjin manga series Seiyu's Life!, with art by Kenjiro Hata, is receiving an anime television series adaptation.

== Filmography ==
=== Television animation ===
- A Little Snow Fairy Sugar (2001) – Saga
- .hack//Sign (2002, Episode 28: "Unison") – BlackRose (Hayami Akira)
- Gravion (2002) – Kaori Stephanie
- Haibane Renmei (2002) – Shouta
- Rizelmine (2002) – Aoi
- Spiral: The Bonds of Reasoning (2002) – Hiyono Yuizaki
- D.N.Angel (2003) – Risa Harada
- Ikki Tousen (2003) – Hakufu Sonsaku
- Popotan (2003) – Mai
- Gravion Zwei (2004) – Kaori Stephanie
- Uta∽Kata (2004) – Manatsu Kuroki
- Daphne in the Brilliant Blue (2004) – Gloria
- Yumeria (2004) – Mizuki
- Melody of Oblivion (2004) – Sayoko Tsukinomori
- He Is My Master (2005) – Izumi
- Hell Girl (2005) – Mina Minato (Episode 15)
- Mahoraba ~Heartful days~ (2005) – Megumi Momono
- Shakugan no Shana (2005) – Yukari Hirai
- Solty Rei (2005) – Rose Anderson
- High School Girls (2006) – Yuma Suzuki
- Otome wa Boku ni Koishiteru (2006) – Mariya Mikado
- Tokimeki Memorial Only Love (2006) – Naomi Hoshina
- Dōjin Work (2007) – Najimi Osana
- Hayate the Combat Butler (2007) – Risa Asakaze
- Prism Ark (2007) – Princea
- Ikki Tousen: Dragon Destiny (2007) – Hakufu Sonsaku
- Monochrome Factor (2008) – Aya Suzuno
- Ikki Tousen: Great Guardians (2008) – Hakufu Sonsaku
- One Piece (2009) – Marguerite
- Strike Witches 2 (2010) – Junko Takei
- Ikki Tousen: Xtreme Xecutor (2010) – Hakufu Sonsaku
- Yumekui Merry (2011) – Nao Horie
- Blood-C (2011) – Yūka Amino
- Beelzebub (2011) – Pillar Agiel
- Hyouka (2012) – Ayako Kouchi
- Aikatsu! (2013) – Saki Hashiba
- Blood Lad (2013) – Berosu
- Tenkai Knights (2014) – Beni
- Marvel Disk Wars: The Avengers (2014) – Mystique
- Go! Princess PreCure (2015) – Minami Kaido/Cure Mermaid
- Triage X (2015) – Miki Tsurugi
- Seiyu's Life! (2015) – Herself
- Beyblade Burst (2016) – Chiharu Aoi
- Keijo (2016) – Kyoko Shirayuki (episodes 6 & 7)
- Kemono Friends (2017) – Campo Flicker (episode 10, 12)
- Dragon Ball Super (2017) – Cocoa Amaguri (episodes 73 & 74), Xeres
- Tonikaku Kawaii (2020) – Kanoka Yuzaki (episode 8)
- Dragon Goes House-Hunting (2021) – Lilith (episode 6)
- Shin Ikki Tousen (2022) – Hakufu Sonsaku
- RWBY: Ice Queendom (2022) – Glynda Goodwitch

=== Original video animations (OVAs) ===
- A Little Snow Fairy Sugar (2003) – Saga
- Eiken (2003) – Kirika Misono
- Uta∽Kata (2005) – Manatsu Kuroki
- Kowarekake no Orgel (2009) – Flower
- Kase-san and Morning Glories (2018) – Sensei
- Ikki Tousen: Western Wolves (2019) – Hakufu Sonsaku

=== Theatrical animation ===
- Saint Seiya: Legend of Sanctuary (2014) – Scorpio Milo
- Pretty Cure All Stars: Spring Carnival (2015) – Minami Kaido/Cure Mermaid
- Go! Princess Precure the Movie: Go! Go!! Splendid Triple Feature!!! (2015) – Minami Kaido/Cure Mermaid
- Pretty Cure All Stars: Singing with Everyone Miraculous Magic! (2016) – Minami Kaido/Cure Mermaid
- Pretty Cure Dream Stars! (2017) – Minami Kaido/Cure Mermaid
- Hugtto! PreCure Futari wa Pretty Cure: All Stars Memories (2018) – Minami Kaido/Cure Mermaid
- Psycho-Pass: Sinners of the System (2019) – Risa Aoyanagi

=== Video games ===
- .hack (2002–2005) – BlackRose (Hayami Akira)
- Symphonic Rain (2004) – Falsita Fawcett
- Summon Night: Swordcraft Story 2 (2004) – Torris
- Tales of Legendia (2005) – Chloe Valens
- Critical Velocity (2005) – Clara
- Soulcalibur III (2005) – Tira
- .hack//G.U. (2006–2007, 2017) – Alkaid (Youkou)
- Mobile Suit Gundam: MS Sensen 0079 (2007) – Lil Somas
- Bleach: The 3rd Phantom (2008) – Matsuri Kudo
- Soulcalibur IV (2008) – Tira
- Soulcalibur: Broken Destiny (2009) – Tira
- beatmania IIDX 17 SIRIUS (2009) – Nyah
- The Legend of Heroes: Trails from Zero (2010) – Noel Seeker
- The Legend of Heroes: Trails to Azure (2011) – Noel Seeker
- Valkyria Chronicles III (2011) – Imca
- Rune Factory: Tides of Destiny (2011) – Odette
- Growlanser IV: Wayfarer of Time (2011) – Eliza
- Soulcalibur V (2012) – Tira
- Project X Zone (2012) – BlackRose, Imca
- Dynasty Warriors 8 (2013) – Zhang Chunhua
- Toukiden: The Age of Demons (2013 – Ouka
- Dragon Ball Xenoverse (2015) – Time Patroller (Female 1)
- Digimon Story: Cyber Sleuth (2015) – Makiko Date
- Super Robot Taisen OG: The Moon Dwellers (2016) – Calvina Coulange
- Dragon Ball Xenoverse 2 (2016) – Time Patroller (Female 1)
- Warriors All-Stars (2017) – Ouka
- Digimon Story: Cyber Sleuth – Hacker's Memory (2017) – Makiko Date
- Food Fantasy (2018) – Foie Gras, Crepe, Hawthorne Ball
- Soulcalibur VI (2018) – Tira
- Kingdom Hearts III (2019) – GoGo Tomago
- Valkyrie Connect – Völva, Avencia.

=== Misc. ===
- Amai Tsumi no Kajitsu drama CD – Kurihara
- Special A drama CD – Hikari Hanazono
- Exit Trance – KANA (Music Series)
- Wild Arms 3 Drama CD – Virginia Maxwell
- 7th Dragon III Code: VFD Drama CD – Nagiri

=== Dubbing roles ===
==== Live-action ====
- 47 Meters Down – Lisa (Mandy Moore)
- Bloodshot – KT (Eiza González)
- Daredevil: Born Again - Heather Glenn (Margarita Levieva)
- Dark Phoenix – Vuk (Jessica Chastain)
- A Discovery of Witches – Gillian Chamberlain (Louise Brealey)
- Extant – Julie Gelineau (Grace Gummer)
- The Gilded Age – Bertha Russell (Carrie Coon)
- Gone – Jill Conway (Amanda Seyfried)
- A Good Man – Lena (Iulia Verdes)
- How to Get Away with Murder – Laurel Castillo (Karla Souza)
- M3GAN – Gemma (Allison Williams)
- Mr. Moll and the Chocolate Factory – Fritz (Maxwell Mare)
- Peter Rabbit 2: The Runaway – Mittens
- Pirates of the Caribbean: Dead Men Tell No Tales – Shansa (Golshifteh Farahani)
- San Andreas – Blake Gaines (Alexandra Daddario)
- Triloquist – Angelina (Paydin LoPachin)
- The Wedding Ringer – Gretchen Palmer (Kaley Cuoco)

==== Animation ====
- The Adventures of Jimmy Neutron, Boy Genius – Cindy Vortex
- Big Hero 6 – GoGo Tomago
- The Looney Tunes Show – Tina Russo
- RWBY – Glynda Goodwitch
- Wonder Park – Greta

== Books ==
Asano wrote a children's book series.

- Uru wa Sorairo Majo (ウルは空色魔女), illustrated by You Shiina (3 volumes, February 2009 – December 2010, Kadokawa Shoten)

== Awards ==
- the Best Radio Personality in the 1st Seiyu Awards (2007)
- the Highest Prize of Children's story category in the 13th Ohisama Taisho (2007)
