= Yuki Nagaku =

Japanese voice actress

- 長久 友紀
- Born: April 8, 1990 (age 36); Hyōgo, Japan
- Occupation: Voice actress
- Years active: 2012–present
- Agent: Aoni Production
- Height: 166.5 cm (5 ft 6 in)

Yuki Nagaku (長久 友紀, Nagaku Yuki; born April 8, 1990) is a Japanese voice actress. She is affiliated with Aoni Production. She is a member of the voice actress singing unit Earphones.

== Filmography ==
=== Anime ===
2014

- Medamayaki no Kimi Itsu Tsubusu?, Aki
- Kutsudaru, Chika-chan

2015

- Seiyu's Life!, Ichigo Moesaki
- Marvel Disk Wars: The Avengers, Citizen

2016

- Dragon Ball Super, Angel
- Sailor Moon Crystal, Mimete
- Samurai Warriors, Maid B
- Persona 5: The Animation -The Day Breakers-,
- Lupin III

2017

- Akiba's Trip: The Animation, Arisa Ahokainen
- Magical Circle Guru Guru, Ena
- Hajimete no Gal, Yukana Yame
- Kaito x Ansa,
- Clione no Akari, Goldfish scoop and shopkeeper
- Elegant Yokai Apartment Life, Enoue
- Anime-Gatari, Satori

2018

- A Place Further than the Universe, Female student (ep 1)
- Ms. Koizumi Loves Ramen Noodles, Gal

2019

- The Price of Smiles, Lily Earhart
- YU-NO: A Girl Who Chants Love at the Bound of this World, Kun-Kun

2020

- Fly Me to the Moon - Aurora

2021

- Digimon Ghost Game - Kazuma's Mother

=== Video games ===
2012

- Monster Retsuden Oreca Battle

2013

- Atelier Escha & Logy: Alchemists of the Dusk Sky -

2015

- MÚSECA（Maica）
- Otoca Doll - Koko

2016

- Ys VIII: Lacrimosa of Dana - Alison, Sister Nia

2017

- The Legend of Heroes: Trails in the Sky the 3rd - Grandmaster

2018

- Xenoblade Chronicles 2: Torna – The Golden Country - Mikhail
- Master of Eternity - Naiz
- MapleStory - Ark (Female)

2020

- Atelier Ryza 2: Lost Legends & the Secret Fairy - Romy Vogel

2025

- ToHeart - Tomoko Hoshina

=== Tokusatsu ===
2020

- Mashin Sentai Kiramager - Mashin Helico
