= Shiromajo Gakuen =

Innocent Lilies
- Directed by: Koichi Sakamoto
- Story by: Reiko Yoshida
- Starring: Dempagumi.inc
- Music by: Yasuhiro Misawa
- Production companies: Toei Company; TV Asahi
- Release date: September 21, 2013 (Japan)
- Running time: 99 minutes
- Country: Japan
- Language: Japanese

Shiromajo Gakuen (白魔女学園) is a 2013 motion picture starring the J-Pop group Dempagumi.inc, and directed by Koichi Sakamoto, who is known for directing the Super Sentai Series.

== Story ==
The "Shiromajo Gakuen" (White Witches Academy), is a girls school where students learn witchcraft. The new students are Moga Shiratori (Moga Mogami), Nemu Watanuki (Nemu Yumemi), Mirin Yukino (Mirin Furukawa), Eimi Odamaki (Eimi Naruse) and Ayane Shiomi (Ayane Fujisaki). They all have their hearts broken and have a deep emotional pain. Older students directed by Risa Kikuta (Risa Aizawa) assign tasks to the group of new students. Tasks are steps to acquire sorcery skills. The actresses of the film are known from Dempagumi.inc group, between members are known Arisa Komiya (Tokumei Sentai Go-Busters), Hikari Takara (GTO - 2012) and Kasumi Yamaya (Kamen Rider × Kamen Rider Wizard & Fourze: Movie War Ultimatum, Shuriken Sentai Ninnninger). It is a co-production between TV Asahi and Toei Company, and brings a lot of action mixed with ecchi elements.

A sequel, titled Shiromajo Gakuen: Owari to Hajimari was released on June 13, 2015, and can be seen worldwide at Viki.

== Cast of characters ==
Dempagumi.inc

Shiromajo Gakuen (Innocent Lilies)

White Witches

- Moga Mogami as Moga Shiratori
- Nemu Yumemi as Nemu Watanuki
- Mirin Furukawa as Mirin Yukino
- Eimi Naruse as Eimi Odamaki
- Ayane Fujisaki as Ayane Shiomi
- Risa Aizawa as Risa Kikuta
- Arisa Komiya as Anzu Mikumo
- Hikari Takara as Nigera Hishimochi
- Kasumi Yamaya as Kasumi Shiratori
- Sae Shiraishi as Natsuyo Momota
- Yu Aikawa as Fuyuko Kashiwagi

Shiromajo Gakuen: Owari to Hajimari (Innocent Lilies 2)

White Witches

- Moga Mogami as Moga Shiratori
- Nemu Yumemi as Nemu Watanuki
- Mirin Furukawa as Mirin Yukino
- Eimi Naruse as Eimi Odamaki
- Ayane Fujisaki as Ayane Shiomi
- Risa Aizawa as Risa Kikuta
- Rina Koike as Rina Kinugasa

Black Witches

- Miyuki Torii as Sumire Otogiri
- Fuuka Nishihira as Misaki Tachibana
- Nina Endo as Seiko Aso
- Rin Honoka as Machiko
- Usa Sakurano as Akari

- Syuusuke Saito as Tera
- Ibuki Tsuji as Herumu
- Sho Tomita as Igunisu

- Mao Ichimichi as Ran Hayakawa
- Haruka Tomatsu as Akua
- Kasumi Yamaya as Kasumi Shiratori

== See also ==
- Majisuka Gakuen Japanese drama starred by AKB48
- Sailor Moon Magical girl franchise
