= Ultraman Ginga S The Movie =

- Blu-Ray DVD cover, featuring Ultraman Ginga (left), Ultraman Victory (right) and Ultraman Gingavictory (middle).

Japanese name
- Kanji: 劇場版 ウルトラマンギンガS 決戦! ウルトラ10勇士!!
Transcriptions
- Revised Hepburn: Gekijōban Urutoraman Ginga Esu Kessen! Urutora Jū Yūshi!!
- Directed by: Koichi Sakamoto
- Written by: Yuji Kobayashi; Takao Nakano
- Based on: Ultraman Ginga S by Koichi Sakamoto
- Starring: Takuya Negishi; Kiyotaka Uji; Arisa Komiya; Taiyo Sugiura; Ryuichi Ohura; Yukari Taki; Takahiro Kato; Takuya Kusakawa; Rina Koike; Moga Mogami
- Music by: Takao Konishi
- Production company: Tsuburaya Productions
- Distributed by: Shochiku
- Release dates: 14 March 2015 (Japan); 8 January 2017 (United States)
- Running time: 63 mins
- Country: Japan
- Language: Japanese

Ultraman Ginga S The Movie (劇場版 ウルトラマンギンガS 決戦! ウルトラ10勇士!!, Gekijōban Urutoraman Ginga Esu Kessen! Urutora Jū Yūshi!!; also called Ultraman Ginga S the Movie: Showdown! The 10 Ultra Warriors!) is a Japanese tokusatsu superhero film, serving as the film adaptation of the 2014 Ultra Series television series Ultraman Ginga S. It was released on March 14, 2015 in Japan and legally screened in English dub by the Philippine cinema chain SM Cinema. The film was also released on January 8, 2017 in the United States along with Ultraman X The Movie as a double feature. Actors of the English dub were announced on December 10, 2016 by SciFi Japan. The American release also coincided with the Canadian release from William Winckler Productions.

== Plot ==
After brainwashing Alena to his side, the Space Time Demon Etelgar goes on a quest to seal all Heisei Ultra Warriors in existence, with the recent being Cosmos on Planet Juran, who has separated Musashi to save his host while Ultraman Zero chases him within various dimensions.

On Earth, UPG members celebrate Hikaru's return from a year-long trip as he is introduced to two new members Sakuya and the rebuilt Mana. The party is interrupted by Alena and Etelgar's arrival as Victory and Ginga fight the giant demon but to no avail. Musashi joins the UPG and manages to warn the Ultras to cancel their transformations before Alena seals them on time. During the team's recuperation and Musashi's introduction, Etelgar attacks the vicinity of Live Base as Alena fights the UPG members and Sho's attack brings her to her senses. However, the golden being has fabricated her memory into a trauma centred around Ginga and puts her under his control once more. Zero fights Etelgar but even his strongest attack is easily shrugged off and only forces the latter to escape out of annoyance while Alena places the captured Ultras on a hostage situation towards Hikaru. While the UPG members go to infiltrate the Space Time Castle, Hikaru and Sho are placed under Zero's tutelage. The success of their training teaches them to cooperate and this allows the UPG members to escape from Alena's fear-inducing influences and break the Ultras free from their imprisonment. Musashi rejoins with Cosmos and the rest of the Heisei Ultras empower the Ultra Fusion Brace.

As things go beyond his expectations, Etelgar manipulates the citizens' fears and creates a gigantic copy of Dark Lugiel. Hikaru and Sho perform the Ultra Touch and bring forth an Ultra Warrior resulted from their alter-ego's combination: Ultraman Gingavictory. The new figure easily phases through Dark Lugiel's attack and destroy him via Gingavictory Breaker. Joined by the rest of the Heisei Ultra Warriors, the group marches towards the tower, but Etelgar creates multiple copies of their past enemies, leaving Cosmos and Gingavictory to reach the upper level. Etelgar and Alena attacks them with their full strength until Cosmos assumes Eclipse Mode, purifying Alena from Etelgar's influence. Through Hikaru's persuasion, Alena manages to regain her memories and finally brought by Cosmos from safety, as Gingavictory resumes battle. The other Ultra Warriors emerge victorious from their battles and Gingavictory chases Etelgar to space, now finally realises his true motives behind the captures of the Ultra Warriors, which is due to their bonds with humanity before finishing him for good with Ultra Fusion Shoot. The rest of the Ultra Warriors soon destroy the Space Time Castle with Crossover Formation.

With the rest of the Heisei Ultras return, Musashi/Cosmos volunteers to deliver Alena to her home after entrusting the safety of the Earth to UPG, Hikaru and Sho. Sho is later recruited into the ranks of UPG and the rest of the crew salute to the viewers after the ending credits roll.

== Production ==
The movie was first announced in November 2014. Takuya Negishi, Hikaru Raido's actor, stated that his favorite Ultraman as a child was Ultraman Cosmos and he was delighted to work alongside Musashi's actor, Taiyo Sugiura.

== Cast ==
=== Japanese cast ===
Actors

- Hikaru Raido (礼堂 ヒカル, Raidō Hikaru)/Ultraman Ginga (ウルトラマンギンガ, Urutoraman Ginga; Voice): Takuya Negishi (根岸 拓哉, Negishi Takuya)
- Sho (ショウ, Shō)/Ultraman Victory (ウルトラマンビクトリー, Urutoraman Bikutorī; Voice): Kiyotaka Uji (宇治 清高, Uji Kiyotaka)
- Alena (アレーナ, Arēna): Arisa Komiya (小宮 有紗, Komiya Arisa)
- Musashi Haruno (春野 ムサシ, Haruno Musashi)/Ultraman Cosmos (ウルトラマンコスモス, Urutoraman Kosumosu; Voice): Taiyo Sugiura (杉浦 太陽, Sugiura Taiyō)
- Arisa Sugita (杉田 アリサ, Sugita Arisa): Yukari Taki (滝 裕可里, Taki Yukari)
- Gouki Matsumoto (松本 ゴウキ, Matsumoto Gōki): Takahiro Kato (加藤 貴宏, Katō Takahiro)
- Tomoya Ichijoji (一条寺 友也, Ichijōji Tomoya): Takuya Kusakawa (草川 拓弥, Kusakawa Takuya)
- Sakuya (サクヤ): Rina Koike (小池 里奈, Koike Rina)
- Mana (マナ): Moga Mogami (最上 もが, Mogami Moga)
- Queen Kisara (キサラ女王, Kisara-joō; Flashback): Mirai Yamamoto (山本 未來, Yamamoto Mirai)
- Yoshiaki Jinno (陣野 義昭, Jinno Yoshiaki): Ryuichi Ohura (大浦 龍宇一, Ōura Ryūichi)

Voice actors

- Ultraman Zero (ウルトラマンゼロ, Urutoraman Zero): Mamoru Miyano (宮野 真守, Miyano Mamoru)
- Ultraman Dyna (ウルトラマンダイナ, Urutoraman Daina): Takeshi Tsuruno (つるの 剛士, Tsuruno Takeshi)
- Ultraman Gaia (ウルトラマンガイア, Urutoraman Gaia): Takeshi Yoshioka (吉岡 毅志, Yoshioka Takeshi)
- Ultraman Mebius (ウルトラマンメビウス, Urutoraman Mebiusu): Jun Fukuyama (福山 潤, Fukuyama Jun)
- Ultraman Tiga (ウルトラマンティガ, Urutoraman Tiga): You Murakami (村上 ヨウ, Murakami Yō)
- Ultraman Nexus (ウルトラマンネクサス, Urutoraman Nekusasu): Kōichi Toshima (外島 孝一, Toshima Kōichi)
- Ultraman Max (ウルトラマンマックス, Urutoraman Makkusu): Kenta Matsumoto (松本 健太, Matsumoto Kenta)
- Jiangshi: Tetsuo Kishi (岸 哲生, Kishi Tetsuo)
- Etelgar (エタルガー, Etarugā): Tatsuhisa Suzuki (鈴木 達央, Suzuki Tatsuhisa)
- Dark Lugiel (ダークルギエル, Dāku Rugieru): Tomokazu Sugita (杉田 智和, Sugita Tomokazu)
- Ginga Spark Voice: Yoshihisa Kawahara (川原 慶久, Kawahara Yoshihisa; Uncredited)

=== English dub actors ===
- Hikaru Raido/Ultraman Ginga: Nicholas Clark
- Sho/Ultraman Victory: Bryan Forrest
- Alena: Beth Ann Sweeze
- Musashi Haruno/Ultraman Cosmos: Paul Stanko
- Arisa Sugita: Lisle Wilkerson
- Gouki Matsumoto: John Katona
- Tomoya Ichijoji: Chad Comey
- Sakuya: Annie Knudsen
- Mana: Lib Campbell
- Yoshiaki Jinno: William Winckler
- Ultraman Zero: Daniel Van Thomas
- Ultraman Dyna: Bradford Hill
- Ultraman Gaia: Chris Cleveland
- Ultraman Mebius: Nicholas Manelick
- Ultraman Tiga: Jay Dee Witney
- Ultraman Nexus: Joe Chambrello
- Ultraman Max, Spark Device voice: Frank Gerrish
- Etelgar: G. Larry Butler

== Spin-off ==
The miniseries Ultra Fight Victory was released as a spin-off of the film.

== Theme song ==
Ending theme

- "Ultraman Victory no Uta 2015" (ウルトラマンビクトリーの歌 2015, Urutoraman Bikutorī no Uta Nisenjūgo; "The Song of Ultraman Victory 2015")
  - Lyrics: Sei Okazaki (岡崎 聖, Okazaki Sei)
  - Composition & Arrangement: Takao Konishi
  - Artist: Voyager with Hikaru & Show (Takuya Negishi & Kiyotaka Uji) feat. Takamiy
- "Ultraman Ginga no Uta 2015" (ウルトラマンギンガの歌 2015, Urutoraman Ginga no Uta Nisenjūgo; "The Song of Ultraman Ginga 2015")
  - Lyrics: Hideki Tama, Sei Okazaki
  - Composition & Arrangement: Takao Konishi
  - Artist: Voyager with Hikaru & Show (Takuya Negishi & Kiyotaka Uji) feat. Takamiy
