= Pretty Cure Miracle Universe =

2019 film by Yukio Kaizawa

- Kanji: 映画プリキュアミラクルユニバース
- Revised Hepburn: Eiga Purikuya Mirakuru Yunibāsu
- Directed by: Yukio Kaizawa
- Screenplay by: Isao Murayama
- Based on: Pretty Cure by Izumi Todo
- Starring: Eimi Naruse; Konomi Kohara; Kiyono Yasuno; Mikako Komatsu; Hina Kino; Hiroyuki Yoshino; Rie Hikisaka; Rina Honnizumi; Yui Ogura; Nao Tamura; Yukari Tamura; Konomi Tada; Junko Noda; Jun Fukushima; Karen Miyama; Haruka Fukuhara; Tomo Muranaka; Saki Fujita; Nanako Mori; Inori Minase; Mika Kanai; Yū Mizushima
- Cinematography: Kenji Takahashi
- Music by: Yuki Hayashi; Asami Tachibana
- Production company: Toei Animation
- Distributed by: Toei Company, Ltd.
- Release date: March 16, 2019
- Running time: 70 minutes
- Country: Japan
- Language: Japanese

Pretty Cure Miracle Universe (Japanese: 映画プリキュアミラクルユニバース, Hepburn: Eiga Purikyua Mirakuru Yunibāsu) is a 2019 Japanese animated action fantasy film based on the Pretty Cure franchise created by Izumi Todo. The film is directed by Yukio Kaizawa, written by Isao Murayama, and produced by Toei Animation. The film was released on March 16, 2019.

Marking the twelfth entry to the Pretty Cure All Stars crossover film series, the Star Twinkle PreCure team joins Hug! Pretty Cure and Kirakira Pretty Cure a la Mode teams as they explore the planet that originated the Miracle Lights.

== Plot ==
The Star Twinkle PreCure team: Hikaru, Lala, Elena and Kaguya are stargazing through their telescope, but they are transported to outer space by a bird-like creature named Piton, whom used his Miracle Light to brought them here. The light also brings Hug! Pretty Cure team: Hana, Saaya, Homare, Emiru and Lulu, as well as Kirakira Pretty Cure a la Mode team: Ichika, Himari, Aoi, Yukari, Akira and Ciel. Not long after, the dark cloud catches up and tries to attack Piton, but Hug! and Kirakira team transforms, attacks and forms a shield around the dark cloud. Wanting to help, the Star Twinkle team also transforms and fights with them, and with the Elder's plead, Piton tries to summon more Pretty Cures using the Miracle Light. However, Star Twinkle team's attacks becomes unsuccessful as their hearts aren't united and attacking with brute forces. The dark cloud cut through the shield, reverting Cures to their civilian forms and dims the shine on Piton's Miracle Light. Piton reaches the conclusion that the three Pretty Cure teams and the Miracle Light are not just useless, but a lie.

The Cures are separated to three planets; One full of clouds, one in a blazing hot climate and one full of bird-like citizens similar to Piton. Each Cures briefly bonds in the respective planets, with Piton having his heart warmed due to Lala's fruit ice cream. However, the space police troops arrives and tries to arrest the Cures, as the president suspects them as crimes for darkening the universe. They capture Ichika, Himari, Lala, Aoi and Ciel, while Piton escapes to the hot planet and sees that Soleil and Selene have escaped. Piton arrives to the cloud planet and with the help of the Miracle Light, he clears the path of darkness for Star, Yell, Ange and Etoile. Piton and the Cures arrive at the factory to complete his Miracle Light, but soon gets trapped in a cage.

With brief disagreements with the president, Yango pulls a liquid out and have Piton finishes his Light, but soon shines a red light, and Yango reveals that he is responsible for everything that has happened. Revealing his true form, Yango manipulate and brainwashes the citizens over the universe, including Earth, and have them cheer for him using the Dark Lights. The Cures escape from their cages and proceeds to fight Yango, while Star and Piton, along with the president reach the top of the factory. As Piton blames himself, the president comforts him by have Piton use his tears to finish his Miracle Light. With his Light finished, the darkness melts away and reverses the brainwashing citizens. With the cheers from citizens across the universe, as well as the previous Pretty Cure teams, the three Pretty Cure teams forms a pyramid and uses "Pretty Cure Miracle Universe Twinkle" attack and purifies Yango. The president tells the audience that a new legend was created, and Piton is promoted as an outstanding Miracle Light maker. Everyone chants and cheers for the Pretty Cures, as the universe is at peace.

Back on Earth, Hikaru and the others, including Hana and Ichika's teams, are stargazing together. Ryōtarō, whom returns with cup of teas, wonders where the other girls came from, but shrugs, and finds it good to have more people.

== Voice cast ==
Star Twinkle PreCure cast

- Eimi Naruse as Hikaru Hoshina/Cure Star
- Konomi Kohara as Lala Hagoromo/Cure Milky
- Kiyono Yasuno as Elena Amamiyama/Cure Soleil
- Mikako Komatsu as Madoka Kaguya/Cure Selene
- Hina Kino as Fuwa
- Hiroyuki Yoshino as Prunce

Hug! Pretty Cure cast

- Rie Hikisaka as Hana Nono/Cure Yell
- Rina Honnizumi as Saaya Yakushiji/Cure Ange
- Yui Ogura as Homare Kagayaki/Cure Étoile
- Nao Tamura as Emiru Aisaki/Cure Macherie
- Yukari Tamura as Ruru Amour/Cure Amour
- Konomi Tada as Hugtan
- Junko Noda as Hariham Harry
  - Jun Fukushima as Hariham's human form

Kirakira Pretty Cure a la Mode cast

- Karen Miyama as Ichika Usami/Cure Whip
- Haruka Fukuhara as Himari Arisugawa/Cure Custard
- Tomo Muranaka as Aoi Tategami/Cure Gelato
- Saki Fujita as Yukari Kotozume/Cure Macaron
- Nanako Mori as Akira Kenjō/Cure Chocolat
- Inori Minase as Kirarin/Ciel Kirahoshi/Cure Parfait
- Mika Kanai as Pekorin
- Yū Mizushima as Elder

Film characters

- Etsuko Kozakura as Piton
- Yuki Kaji as Yango
- Yuji Tanaka as the president

Other Pretty Cure characters

- Yōko Honna as Nagisa Misumi/Cure Black
- Yukana as Honoka Yukishiro/Cure White
- Yū Shimamura as Haruka Haruno/Cure Flora
- Rie Takahashi as Mirai Asahina/Cure Miracle.

== Production ==
In December 2018, the next All Stars film was first teased months after Hug! Pretty Cure Futari wa Pretty Cure: All Stars Memories release. The film is directed by Yukio Kaizawa, who previously directed Kirakira Pretty Cure a la Mode series, with screenplay provided by Isao Murayama, whom was in charge of writing Witchy PreCure! and Star Twinkle PreCure series, as well as the Pretty Cure All Stars DX trilogy. In January 2019, it was announced that Yuki Kaji will voice a character named Yango for the film.

== Release ==
The film was released in theaters in Japan on March 16, 2019.

== Reception ==
=== Box office ===
The film ranked number 3 out of top 10 in the Japanese box office in its opening weekend.
