= Dempagumi.inc =

Japanese female idol group

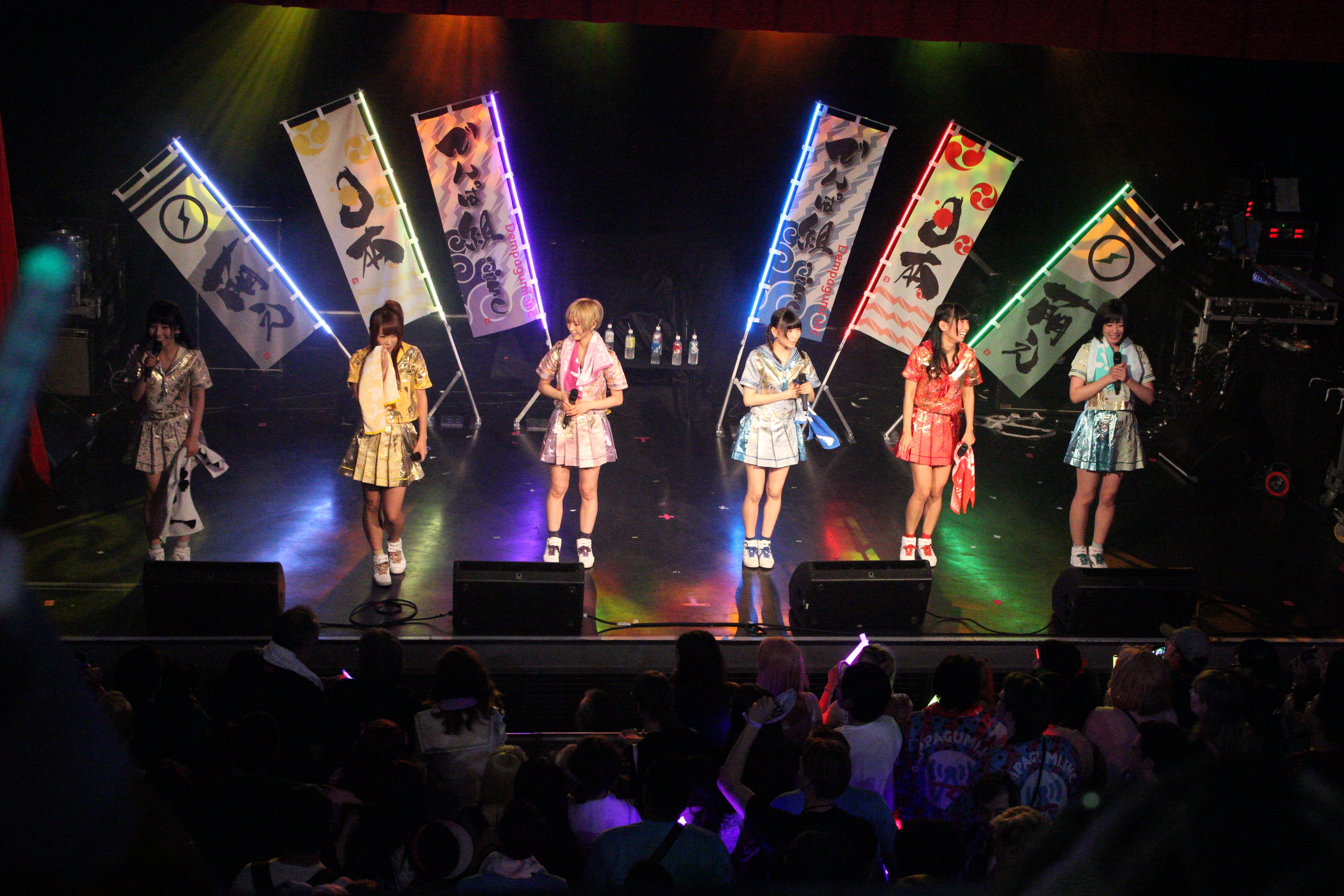
- Dempagumi.inc at Hyper Japan 2015 in London, England

Background information
- Origin: Akihabara, Tokyo, Japan
- Genres: J-pop; Animesong; Bubblegum Pop
- Years active: 2008–2025
- Labels: Lantis (2010); Meme Tokyo (2011–2025)
- Members: Mirin Furukawa; Risa Aizawa; Ayane Fujisaki; Kaname Rin; Rito Amasawa; Ria Kobato; Hina Takasaki
- Past members: Akari Owata; Miu Atobe; Moga Mogami; Nemu Yumemi; Eimi Naruse; Nagi Nemoto; Kozue Aikawa; Aozora Sorano
- Website: dempagumi.tokyo

Dempagumi.inc (でんぱ組.inc, Denpagumi Inku) was a Japanese female idol group from Akihabara, Tokyo. Their music generally follows the style of denpa song. All of its members are said to be former otaku.

The group was formed in 2008 by producer Maiko Fukushima, and released one indie single before undergoing some member changes and being signed to Lantis and Toy's Factory. Since then, they have released several charting singles and albums, performed many concerts around the world, and appeared in several television shows and a 2013 film.

== History ==
=== 2007–2012: Formation, member flexibility era ===
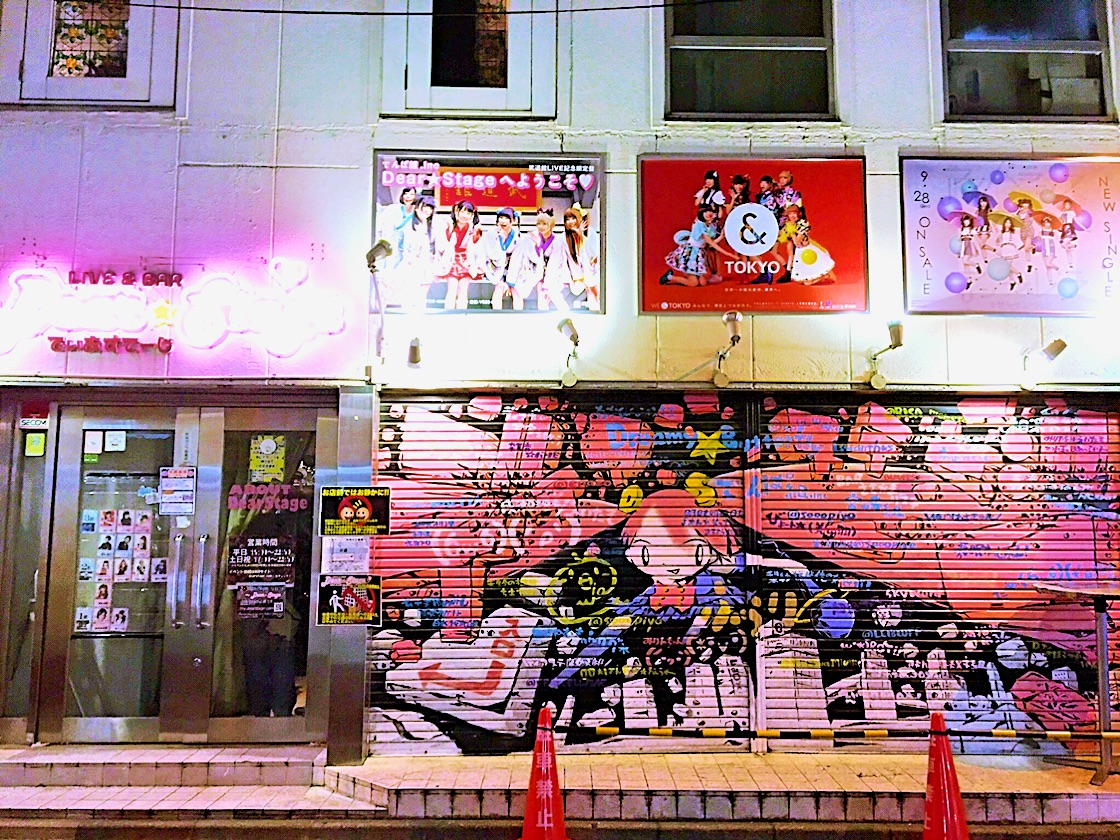
The storefront of DearStage (pictured in 2016), the live house where the first two members of Dempagumi.inc were originally employed

In December 2007, producer Maiko Fukushima opened the live house/bar "DearStage" in the basement of a building near the Suehirocho Station, and moved it to the DEMPA Building (DEMPAビル, DEMPABiru) in September 2008. In December 2008, DearStage salespeople Mirin Furukawa and Akari Owada formed the original Denpagumi (でんぱ組, Denpagumi) and released the single "Mirror Magic?" through an indie label. Fukushima said of the unit's name: "I wanted to give it a retrotic name like Ushiroyubi Sasaregumi." Also, Kenzō Saeki and Masaya Koike, who participated in the naming conference at the time, said that the part of "Dempa" was taken from the Dempa Building.

In June 2009, Meme Nishimura (now Risa Aizawa) and Nemu Yumemi joined.

Taking this opportunity, Fukushima considered changing Dempagumi's name to "renew it to a new feeling". Saeki proposed "Chapé's Fountain" but Fukushima wanted to keep the Dempagumi name and said "If it has an extension (a la MOSAIC.WAV, LOVE.EXE, etc.), it may be good for Akiba[hara]." According to Saeki, it is absolutely necessary to avoid unit names ending in "gumi", as it would be too similar to the aforementioned Ushiroyubi Sasaregumi.

There are various accounts about the reason ".inc" was selected. The meaning of "Dempagumi's evolutionary system" was once considered. Another reason is that "it would be interesting if "inc" was added to the end of a company [name]". So it was decided that ".inc" would be added, changing the group's name to "Dempagumi.inc".

In addition, according to Yumemi, "The interpretation that Aizawa and Yumemi joined 'Dempagumi' and renamed it Dempagumi.inc is a little different." It is also said that it was four people of Furukawa, Owada, Aizawa, and Yumemu who happened to have passed, and it is said that it was something which was collected regardless of the original "Dempagumi". Although the original name is "でんぱ組.inc", the debut single released by Lantis mistakenly named them as "でんぱ組inc."

On February 24, 2010, their debut single "Kiss + Kiss de Owaranai" with ULTRA-PRISM, which featured the music of the PC game "Tropical KISS", was released from Lantis. (Note: Regarding the major debut issue, there is also a case that points to the first single "Future Diver" from the label "MEME TOKYO" under the umbrella of Toys Factory.) Eitaso and Miu Atobe joined on June 3, and Owada graduated on July 8. On August 15, Meme Nishimura was renamed Risa Aizawa, and on January 28, 2011, Eitaso was renamed Eimi Naruse. On July 6, the second single "Piko Piku Pikatte Koishite yo", Denpagumi.inc's first single release, was released from Lantis, and Aizawa became the group leader at the same time.

On September 9, they were transferred to MEME TOKYO, a label newly co-founded by Fukushima and Toy's Factory. Their third single Future Diver was released on November 16, and their first album, Nē Kīte? Uchuu wo Sukū no wa, Kitto Osushi... de wa Naku, Dempagumi.inc!, was released on December 14 by MEME TOKYO. After their first one-man performance at Harajuku Astro Hall, Atobe graduated, and Moga Mogami and Ayane Fujisaki joined. (Note: Additionally, there was a time when seven people were doing dance lessons for about a month until that periformance, and Atobe taught dance to Mogadishu and Fujisaki.)

=== 2012–2015: One Man Tour, Nippon Budokan, Oricon #1 ===
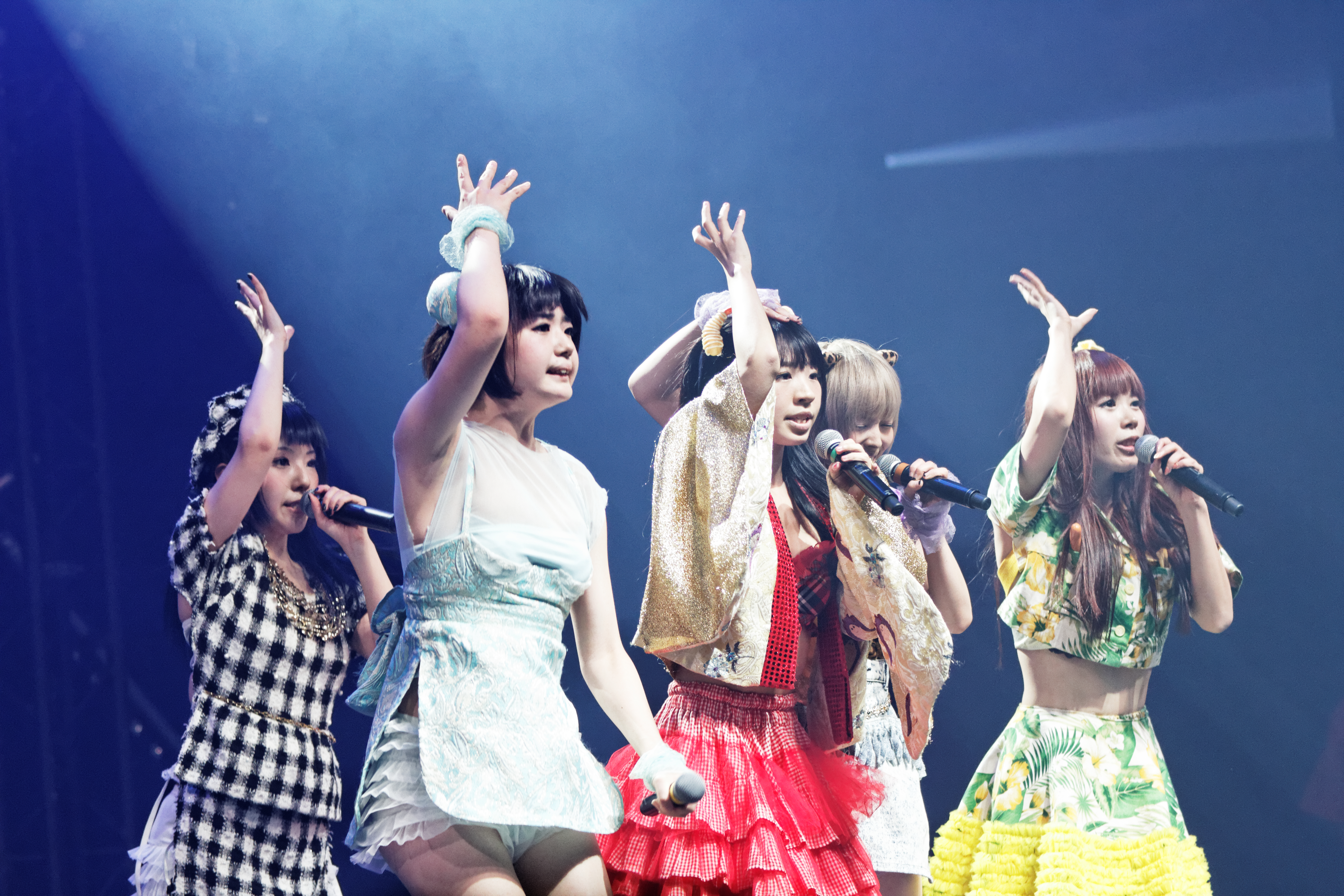
Dempagumi.inc at Japan Expo Paris, July 2013 (Note: Fujisaki was absent due to the school exam.)

On February 26, 2012, they were champions in the 1st Idol Yokocho Cup!!. Their fourth and fifth singles were released on May 23 and July 18. On June 15, Tele-Asa Dōga debuted Dempagumi.inc's variety show Denpa no Kamigami. On September 16, the first one-man live was held with six members, and in the show, Furukawa stated "The members discussed and set goals, and they wanted six people to [perform] at [Nippon] Budokan!".

Dempagumi.inc's first tour was held from January 5 to 20, 2013. On January 16, their sixth single, "WWD", was released, and become their first Oricon Singles Chart Top 10 single, and their seventh single was released on May 29, charting at #6. They later performed at Osaka Castle Outdoor Music Hall on August 31 and Hibiya Open-Air Concert Hall on September 16. Their eighth single was released on October 2, and their second album "WORLD WIDE DEMPA" was released on December 11. The band's official fan club, Dempadō (でんぱとう, Denpadō), started on May 28, 2013.

The second national tour started on January 4, 2014. During Day 2, "Budokan Performance Decision!" (武道館公演決定!, Budōkan Kōen Kettei) was projected on the screen, and it was a surprise announcement that the Nippon Budokan performance would be held. The members who had not been informed in advance cried, and Furukawa said, "I am really happy because I wanted to go to the Budokan during this year," and "a dream really comes true." The performance was held on May 6, and drew a crowd of 10,000 people.

On March 12, the ninth single Sakura Appareshon was released, and two more on May 14 and July 30. A national live house tour was held from July 23 to September 2. On September 20, their next single, Stand〜Koko ni iru yo〜, was released for their collaboration unit with Moso Calibration, "The universe is made of 11 dimensions" (宇宙は11次元で出来ている, Uchū wa jūni-jigen de dekite iru).

On October 19, their first show on terrestrial television, Denpa Jack -World Wide Akihabara- debuted on Fuji TV. On October 25 they performed at "Anime Idol Asia" in Bangkok, Thailand, alongside Yumemiru Adolescence and the Kamen Rider Girls. On November 12, their next single, "Ai ga aru kara!!", was released under the "Dempagumi.inc×gdgdYōseis" moniker. On November 26 their next single Demparty Night was released.

=== 2015–2017: Yoyogi Gymnasium performance, Battle of the Bands tour ===
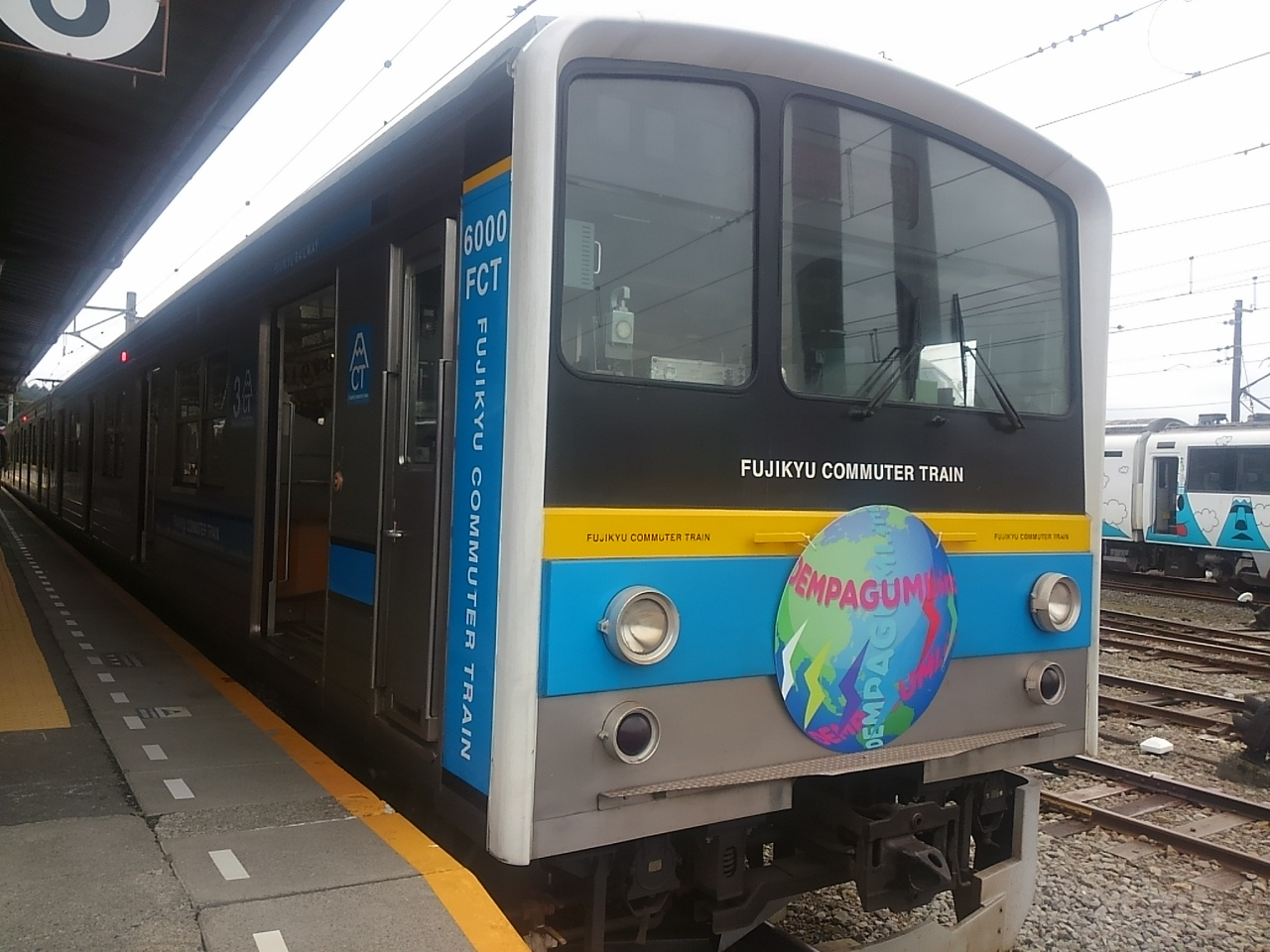
A Fujikyuko Line train with a Dempagumi.inc World Tour head mark at Kawaguchiko Station on September 27, 2015

On February 10 and 11, 2015, a concert was held at Yoyogi National Gymnasium for two days, with an audience of 20,000. A national tour was held from February 27 to May 6. From July 16 to August 6, they hosted the Battle of the Bands tour "Kagayaki Tour". On September 26 and 27, they held a live performance at the Lake Kawaguchi Stellar Theater, claiming that it will be the final round of the World Tour (consecutive appearances to overseas Japanese cultural events) in June and July. (Note: Additionally, they were scheduled to appear in JAPAN EXPO THAILAND 2015, which was scheduled to be held in Bangkok, Thailand from August 28 to 30, 2015, but it was postponed due to the 2015 Bangkok bombing on August 17.) On June 19 they made their first appearance on Music Station.

Their third album "WWDD" was released on February 18. On April 29, for their collaboration unit "Shokotan♥Dempagumi" with Shoko Nakagawa, their single "PUNCH LINE!" was released. On June 13, their 13th single was released. On September 16, their 14th single "Ashita Chikyu ga Konagona ni Nattemo" was released, becoming the first one to top the Billboard Japan single charts. In addition, on October 9 and December 18, distribution limited singles were released, and Aizawa worked on the jacket illustrations of both singles.

The "Best Japanese Act" voting at the 2015 MTV Europe Music Awards was held on Twitter on September 15. On October 15 the result of the web voting was to be the Japan representative.

In 2016, three singles were released once a month from January to March. A tour of 30 performances from 21 prefectures was held from January 9 to April 2. Their fourth album "GOGO DEMPA" was released on April 27. A second Battle of the Bands tour was held from July to September. As a tie in with the anime The Disastrous Life of Saiki K., the ending theme was released on August 8, and their 15th single, Sai PSI Sai Kouchou!, was released on November 2. On December 21, their first best album was released.

=== 2017–2019: Member count changes in six years ===
They performed for the "Makukō Arena Tour 2017 Denpa Ryōkō Wi-Fi Kanbi!" in January 2017 in three arenas: the World Memorial Hall; the Makuhari Messe; and for an extra performance on the 20th, the Nippon Budōkai.

On August 6, Mogami announced on her blog that she left the group on the same date:

My mind and body became out of balance, and it became very difficult to work in Dempagumi.inc. Although I was unwell and absent from the site which had been decided several times before, I decided not to say that the possibility is zero from now on, I decided to withdraw from the feeling that I would not like to cause any more inconvenience.

She later began to work as a solo artist. On September 1, the official site was redesigned to five.

They appeared as a special guest at the reception party of Takashi Murakami's solo exhibition at the Garage Museum of Contemporary Art in Moscow, Russia on September 28 and presented her first live performance with a new five-member system.

At the Osaka Castle Hall on December 30, it was announced that Rin Kaname and Nagi Nemoto would join Dempagumi.inc.

Now with seven members, they embraced a new space motif and, in 2018, experienced astronaut training at the Tsukuba Space Center. On April 4, their sixteenth single, "Oyasumi Polaris Sayonara Parallel World", was released. They also carried out Mongolia's first stratosphere balloon project by sending an unmanned cassette tape into space to use the footage in a music video for their sixteenth single's B-side track, "Girametasu Dempa Stars".

Dempagumi.inc served as headliner several large festivals, including Idol Yokochō Natsumatsuri 2018. On May 23, they performed at "GIRLS POWER LIVE" at Yokohama Arena. From April to July, they held their first one-man national hall tour with seven people, Cosmo Tour 2018-Planetary Exploration-". On July 7th, they made their second appearance at the Kawaguchiko Stella Theater, "July 7 is the Tanabata Festival Arc". They have also appeared in events across the country and abroad, and also visited three live houses in the "Tohoku Danpa Daisakusen" in early August. Furthermore, from July to September, they also sponsored "Cosmo Tour 2018 – Encounter with the Unknown ~" and "Reunion with the Known –". On September 26, their 17th single "プレシャスサマー!" was released. In "Okinawa Special Edition" held on October 13 and 14, Nemu Yumemi stated that she would graduate on the second day of the group's Budokan performance on January 7 of the following year and then retire in March.

On the first day of 2019, they released their fifth album Wareware wa Dempagumi.inc da. Their third Japanese Budokan performance "Cosmo Tour 2019" was held on January 6 and 7, with an audience of 20,000. On Day 2, Nemu Yumemi graduated, marking the last time Dempagumi.inc would perform with seven members.

The group held live house tours at three locations in Tomeisaka from the end of March to the end of April. In addition, Fukushima, who had been in charge while the group started, returned to produce the group at this time.

=== 2020–2021: The first sub-units, Eimi Naruse's graduation and addition of new members ===
On April 9, 2020, the first sub-unit, NemoPero from Dempagumi.inc (ねもぺろ from でんぱ組.inc) was formed by the newest members Nemoto Nagi and Rin Kaname with the release of their first single "Shukishukishukipi♡gatomaranai ...! (しゅきしゅきしゅきぴ♡がとまらないっ…！)"

In the Live broadcast on November 16, 2020, named "THE FAMILY TOUR 2020 ONLINE FINAL!! I'm sure it will save the universe ... " Naruse announced her graduation at the encore of the show. The graduation performance, named "Ultra ☆ Maximum ☆ Positive ☆ Story!!" was held at Toyosu PIT on February 15–16, 2021. At the end of the second day, five new members, Kozue Aikawa, Rito Amasawa, Ria Kobato, Aozora Sorano, and Hina Takasaki, joined Dempagumi.inc, with the announcement of a new song.

A new sub-unit, Chape No Izumi, was formed on May 5, 2021, with members Ayane Fujisaki, Kozue Aikawa, and Ria Kobato.

On May 20, 2021, Mirin Furukawa entered maternity leave and announced the birth of her son on July 16.

=== 2022–2024: Nagi Nemoto's graduation, and Kozue Aikawa's graduation, lineup changes and announcement of disbandment ===
In a blog post released on January 11, 2022, it was announced that Nagi Nemoto would graduate from Dempagumi.inc at April 30, 2022, and Niji no Conquistador on April 11, 2022, citing health problems. A solo performance was held on April 30, serving as Nemoto's graduation as an idol.

In a blog post released on October 28, 2022, it was announced that Kozue Aikawa would graduate from Dempagumi.inc at December 31, 2022, citing health problems. In a blog post released on October 11, 2022, it was also announced that Aikawa also will be absent from future events due to health problems.

In a blog post released on September 11, 2023, it was announced that Aozora Sorano would graduate from Dempagumi.inc at January 13, 2024, to focus on her activities in Arcana Project, which she had concurrently done along with Dempagumi.inc.

In a blog post released on April 20, 2024, it was announced that after discussions with the band members and the crew about the group's future activities, it was decided to end the activities of the group in early 2025, after 16 years of activities.

== Reception ==
Nikkei Entertainment described Dempagumi.inc and Babymetal as the two breakout idol groups of 2014, and perceived the fandoms' connection thorough music and concept as a common point between the two groups. Originally, the musicality of idols is no holds barred (nandemo ari), and it is said that both idolism and artistism are achieved by narrowing down the genre.

== Members ==
Name	Nickname	Date Joined	Color	Birthday	Notes
Mirin Furukawa (古川 未鈴, Furukawa Mirin)	Mirin-chan (みりんちゃん)	2008	Red	September 19	Founding member. Hiatus from May–July 2021. Role: Center
Risa Aizawa (相沢 梨紗, Aizawa Risa)	Risa-chi (りさちー)	June 2009	White	August 2	Role: Leader
Ayane Fujisaki (藤咲 彩音, Fujisaki Ayane)	Pinky! (ピンキー！)	December 25, 2011	Blue	December 7	Member of sub-unit Chape No Izumi (チャペの泉)
Rin Kaname (鹿目 凛, Kaname Rin)	Perorin (ぺろりん)	December 30, 2017	Egg Yellow	September 21	Former member of Beboga! (ベボガ！)
Rito Amasawa (天沢璃人, Amasawa Rito)	Rito (りと)	February 16, 2021	Navy Blue	July 19	Member of Meme Tokyo since July 31, 2019
Ria Kobato (小鳩りあ, Kobato Ria)	Ria-pi (りあぴ)	February 16, 2021	Powder Pink	April 4	Former member of ENGAG.ING Member of sub-unit, Chape No Izumi (チャペの泉)
Hina Takasaki (高咲陽菜, Takasaki Hina)	Hina-chan (ひなちゃん)	February 16, 2021	Orange	November 24	Former member of Niji No Fantajista (虹のファンタジスタ)

=== Former members ===
Name	Date Joined	Date Left	Color	Notes
Akari Owata (小和田 あかり, Owata Akari)	2008	July 8, 2010	None	Founding member
Miu Atobe (跡部 みぅ, Atobe Miu)	June 3, 2010	December 25, 2011	Pink	Graduated for employment reasons.
Moga Mogami (最上 もが, Mogami Moga)	December 25, 2011	August 6, 2017	Purple	Joined alongside Ayane Fujisaki. At the time of enrollment, her catchphrase was "Golden Dissenter Running Through The Universe" (宇宙を駆ける金色の異端児, Uchū o kakeru kin'iro no itan-ji). Withdrew on August 6, 2017.
Nemu Yumemi (夢眠 ねむ, Yumemi Nemu)	June 15, 2009	January 7, 2019	Mint Green	
Eimi Naruse (成瀬 瑛美, Naruse Eimi)	June 3, 2010	February 16, 2021	Yellow	
Nagi Nemoto (根本 凪, Nemoto Nagi)	December 30, 2017	April 30, 2022	Mint Green (formerly Green)	Member of Niji No Conquistador from 2014 until April 17, 2022.
Kozue Aikawa (愛川こずえ, Aikawa Kozue)	February 16, 2021	December 31, 2022	Light Green	Former member of DANCEROID, Princess At Home, and ENGAG.ING Member of sub-unit, Chape No Izumi (チャペの泉)
Aozora Sorano (空野青空, Sorano Aozora)	February 16, 2021	January 13, 2024	Sky Blue	Member of ARCANA PROJECT since January 18, 2020

== Discography ==
=== Albums ===
No.	Title	Release date	Oricon Weekly Album Chart
1	Nē Kiite? Uchū wo Sukuu no wa, Kitto Osushi... de wa Naku, Dempagumi.inc! (ねぇきいて?宇宙を救うのは、きっとお寿司...ではなく、でんぱ組.inc!)	December 14, 2011	132
2	World Wide Dempa	December 11, 2013	5
3	WWDD	February 18, 2015	3
4	Gogo Dempa	April 27, 2016	3
5	WWDBest: Dempa Ryōkō! (WWDBEST ~電波良好!~)	December 21, 2016	4
6	Wareware wa Dempagumi.inc da (ワレワレハデンパグミインクダ)	January 1, 2019	10
7	Ai ga Chikyū Sukuunsa! Datte Dempagumi.inc wa Family desho (愛が地球救うんさ！だってでんぱ組.incはファミリーでしょ)	April 15, 2020	5
8	Dempark!!!	July 20, 2022	14
9	We Need the Dempa	October 8, 2024	7

=== Live albums ===
No.	Title	Release date	Oricon Weekly Album Chart
1	Dempagumi.inc 1st One-man Live CD "Dempa Life wa Owaranyo!" (でんぱ組.inc 1stワンマン LIVE CD 〜でんぱLIFEはおわらんよっ! 〜)	January 22, 2012	—
2	Dempagumi.inc Live CD (でんぱ組 .inc LIVE CD)	October 19, 2013	
3	Live CD: World Tour 2015 in Fujiyama	January 6, 2015	
4	Cosmo Tour 2019 in Nihon Budōkan Yumemi Nemu Sotsugyō Kōen: Arata Naru Tabidachi (コスモツアー 2019 in 日本武道館 夢眠ねむ卒業公演 〜新たなる旅立ち〜)	March 22, 2019	

=== Extended plays ===
No.	Title	Release date	Oricon Weekly Album Chart
1	Dempakashic Record (でんぱぁかしっくれこーど)	December 14, 2022	14
2	One Nation Under the Dempa	June 21, 2023	10

=== Singles ===
No.	Title	Release date	Oricon Weekly Single Chart
Indie singles
1	"Mirror Magic?"	December 2008	—
Major singles
1	"Kiss + Kiss de Owaranai" (Kiss+kissでおわらない)	February 24, 2010	—
2	"Piko Piku Pikatte Koishite yo" (ピコッピクッピカッて恋してよ)	July 6, 2011	104
3	"Future Diver" (Future Diver)	November 16, 2011	46
4	"Demparade Japan / Tsuyoi Kimochi Tsuyoi Ai" (でんぱれーどJAPAN / 強い気持ち・強い愛)	May 23, 2012	37
5	"Kirakira Tune / Sabotage" (キラキラチューン / Sabotage)	July 18, 2012	19
6	"W.W.D / Fuyu e to Hashiridasuo!" (W.W.D / 冬へと走りだすお!)	January 16, 2013	10
7	"Denden Passion" (でんでんぱっしょん)	May 29, 2013	6
8	"W.W.D II / Notto Botchi... Natsu " (W.W.DII / ノットボッチ...夏)	October 2, 2013	8
9	"Sakura Appareshon" (サクラあっぱれーしょん)	March 12, 2014	3
10	"<Dear☆Stage e Yōkoso♡〜Budōkan LIVE Kinen Genteiban〜" (Dear☆Stageへようこそ♡〜武道館LIVE記念限定盤〜)	May 14, 2014	9
11	"Chururi Chururira" (ちゅるりちゅるりら)	July 30, 2014	10
12	"Demparty Night" (でんぱーりーナイト)	November 26, 2014	3
13	"Punch Line!"	April 29, 2015	13
14	"Otsukare Summer" (おつかれサマー！)	June 17, 2015	3
15	"Ashita Chikyū ga Konagona ni Nattemo" (あした地球がこなごなになっても)	September 16, 2015	2
16	"Sai PSI Sai Kouchou!" (最Ψ最好調!)	November 2, 2016	5
17	"Oyasumi Polaris Sayonara Parallel World / Girametasu Dempa Stars" (おやすみポラリスさよならパラレルワールド / ギラメタスでんぱスターズ)	April 4, 2018	3
18	"Precious Summer!" (プレシャスサマー！)	September 26, 2018	2
19	"Inochi no Yorokobi" (いのちのよろこび)	June 26, 2019	5
20	"Princess Dempa Power! Shine On! / Senshūbanzai! Dempaichiza!" (プリンセスでんぱパワー！シャインオン！ / 千秋万歳！電波一座！)	May 19, 2021	6
21	"Shōdōteki S/K/S/D!" (衝動的S/K/S/D)	September 22, 2021	6
22	"Doki Waku Parade" (ドキ+ワク=パレード!)	March 16, 2022	9

=== Digital singles ===
No.	Title	Release date
1	"Future Diver" (10th anniversary ver.)	November 16, 2021
2	"Kōkan Daybook" (好感Daybook)	December 17, 2021
3	"Hatsu Taiken" (初体験)	January 28, 2022
4	"Denpatte Ikō ze!!" (でんぱっていこーぜ!!)	October 16, 2022
5	"Kodai Akiba Densetsu" (古代アキバ伝説)	March 15, 2023

=== Live performances ===
No.	Title	Release date	Format
1	Seiya, Uchū ni Narihibiku, Demapgumi.inc no Ai to Sukoshi no Dempa: Dempa Life wa Owaranai – Live DVD (聖夜、宇宙に鳴り響く、でんぱ組.incの愛と勇気と少しの電波〜でんぱLIFEは終わらない〜LIVE DVD)	February 25, 2012	DVD
2	Ai o Dempa ni (愛をでんぱに)	December 23, 2012	DVD
3	World Wide ☆ Dempa Tour 2013 Yume Mitatte Iijan!? in ZEPP TOKYO (ワールドワイド☆でんぱツアー 2013 夢見たっていいじゃん!? in ZEPP TOKYO)	March 30, 2013	DVD Blu-ray
4	Natsu no Passion! ~ Minna ga Orushi, Nakama Yade! ~ in Osaka Jō Yagai Ongakudō (夏のパッション！〜みんながおるし、仲間やで！〜 in 大阪城野外音楽堂)	December 18, 2013	DVD Blu-ray
5	Natsu no Passion! ~ Minna ga Irushi, Nakama Damon! ~ in Hibiya Yagai Ongakudō (夏のパッション！〜みんながいるし、仲間だもん！〜 in 日比谷野外音楽堂)	December 18, 2013	DVD Blu-ray
ー	Natsu no Passion! Tōzai Yaon Tour Box Set (夏のパッション！東西野音ツアーBOXセット)	December 18, 2013	2 DVD
6	World Wide Dempa Tour 2014	April 23, 2014	DVD Blu-ray
7	World Wide☆Dempa Tour 2014 in Nippon Budōkan ~ Yume de Owaranyo! (ワールドワイド☆でんぱツアー2014 in 日本武道館〜夢で終わらんよっ！〜)	July 30, 2014	Limited Edition DVD Standard Edition DVD Standard Edition Blu-ray
8	Demparty Night de Party in Kokuritsu Yoyogi Daiichi Taiikukan (でんぱーりーナイト de パーリー in 国立代々木第一体育館)	May 13, 2015	Limited Edition DVD Limited Edition Blu-ray Standard Edition DVD Standard Edition Blu-ray
9	WWD Daibōken Tour 2015: Kono Sekai wa Mada Shiranai Koto Bakari – in Tokyo Dome City Hall (WWD大冒険TOUR2015 〜この世界はまだ知らないことばかり〜 in TOKYO DOME CITY HALL)	August 5, 2015	DVD Blu-ray
10	World Tour 2015 in Fujiyama	January 16, 2016	Limited Edition DVD Limited Edition Blu-ray Standard Edition DVD Standard Edition Blu-ray
11	Gogo Dempa Tour 2016	June 22, 2016	DVD Blu-ray
12	Maku Kami Arena Tour 2017 in Nippon Budōkan: Matamata Koko Kara Yume ga Hajimaruyo! (幕神アリーナツアー2017 in 日本武道館 〜またまたここから夢がはじまるよっ！〜)	April 26, 2017	DVD Blu-ray
13	Maku Kami Arena Tour 2017 Dempa Ryōkō Wi-Fi Kanbi! (幕神アリーナツアー2017 電波良好Wi-Fi 完備！)	April 26, 2017	DVD Blu-ray
14	Nē Mō Ikkai Kiite? Uchū o Sukū no wa Yappari, Dempagumi.inc! (ねぇもう一回きいて?宇宙を救うのはやっぱり、でんぱ組.inc!)	April 4, 2018	Limited Edition DVD Limited Edition Blu-ray Standard Edition DVD Standard Edition Blu-ray
15	Cosmo Tour 2018	September 27, 2018	Limited Edition DVD Limited Edition Blu-ray Standard Edition DVD
16	Cosmo Tour 2019 in Nippon Budōkan (コスモツアー 2019 in 日本武道館)	March 27, 2019	Limited Edition 2 DVD Limited Edition 2 Blu-ray Standard Edition DVD Standard Edition Blu-ray
17	Uhha! Yaaa!! Tour!!! 2019 Special	December 4, 2019	Limited Edition 2 DVD Limited Edition 2 Blu-ray Standard Edition DVD Standard Edition Blu-ray
18	Makuhari Jamboree Concert (幕張ジャンボリーコンサート)	March 25, 2020	Limited Edition 2 DVD Limited Edition 2 Blu-ray Standard Edition DVD Standard Edition Blu-ray
19	The Family Tour 2020 Online	August 5, 2020	DVD Blu-ray
20	The Family Tour 2020 Online Final!! Nē Kiitte? Uchuu o Sukuu no wa Kitto…… (THE FAMILY TOUR 2020 ONLINE FINAL!! ねぇ聞いて？宇宙を救うのはきっと……)	February 3, 2021	DVD Blu-ray
21	Ultra Maximum Positive Story!! Babyu to Iku yo Mirai ni ne (ウルトラ☆マキシマム☆ポジティブ☆ストーリー!! 〜バビュッといくよ未来にね☆〜)	May 19, 2021	DVD+CD Blu-ray+CD
22	Hakoniwa no Okite (箱庭の掟)	March 16, 2022	2 DVD 2 Blu-ray
