= Star Twinkle PreCure =

Japanese anime television series

- Star Twinkle Pretty Cure
- Cover of the last DVD volume, showing the five main Cures in their Twinkle Style forms. From left to right: Cure Selene, Cure Milky, Cure Star, Cure Cosmo and Cure Soleil, along with mascots Fuwa and Prunce.

スター☆トゥインクルプリキュア (Sutā Touinkuru Purikyua)
- Genre: Magical girl, Space opera
- Created by: Izumi Todo
- Anime television series
- Directed by: Hiroaki Miyamoto
- Produced by: Yu Sato (ABC TV); Akira Tanaka (ABC-A); Fumi Yazaki (ADK EM); Akari Yanagawa
- Written by: Isao Murayama
- Music by: Yuki Hayashi; Asami Tachibana
- Studio: Toei Animation
- Original network: ANN (ABC TV, TV Asahi)
- Original run: February 3, 2019 – January 26, 2020
- Episodes: 49
- Manga
- Written by: Izumi Todo
- Illustrated by: Futago Kamikita
- Published by: Kodansha
- Magazine: Nakayoshi
- Original run: February 2019 – December 2019
- Volumes: 2
- Anime film

Star☆Twinkle Precure the Movie: These Feelings Within The Song of Stars
- Directed by: Yūta Tanaka
- Written by: Jin Tanaka
- Music by: Yuki Hayashi; Asami Tachibana
- Studio: Toei Animation
- Released: October 19, 2019
- Runtime: 72 minutes

Star Twinkle Pretty Cure (Japanese: スター☆トゥインクルプリキュア, Hepburn: Sutā Touinkuru Purikyua; stylized as Star☆Twinkle PreCure) is a Japanese magical girl anime series by Toei Animation. It is the sixteenth installment in the Pretty Cure franchise, and the last series released in the Heisei period. It features the fourteenth generation of Cures. It is directed by Hiroaki Miyamoto (One Piece Film: Gold) and written by Isao Murayama. The series aired on all ANN stations in Japan from February 3, 2019, to January 26, 2020, succeeding HUG! PreCure in its time slot. It was then succeeded by Healin' Good Pretty Cure on February 2, 2020. The series' main topics are imagination and diversity, with outer space, constellations and singing as the Cures' main motifs.

== Story ==
The Starry Sky World (星空界, Hoshizora-kai) is the home of the twelve Star Princesses, who are based on the Zodiac signs and maintain order in the universe. When the Notraiders attack the Star Palace, the princesses scatter themselves across the universe as the Princess Star Color Pens. Seeking to revive the princesses and prevent the universe from being consumed in darkness, the aliens Lala and Prunce travel with the fairy Fuwa to Mihoshi Town (観星町, Mihoshi-chō) on Earth, where they meet the imaginative Hikaru Hoshina. After receiving a Star Color Pendant and a Star Color Pen, Hikaru transforms into the legendary Pretty Cure, Cure Star. Joined by Lala and two other girls, Elena and Madoka, as well as the shapeshifting catgirl alien Yuni, Hikaru leads the Star Twinkle Pretty Cure as they seek to revive the Star Princesses and fight against the Notraiders.

== Characters ==
=== Pretty Cures ===
Hikaru Hoshina (星奈 ひかる, Hoshina Hikaru) / Cure Star (キュアスター, Kyua Sutā)
Voiced by: Eimi Naruse
The main protagonist. A 13-year-old second-year middle school student who loves stars and constellations. She is a cheerful girl full of imagination, but also stubborn and often acts on intuition. She enjoys looking at the stars and writing in her notebook, which through Fuwa's power becomes the "Twinkle Book." As Cure Star, her main technique is "Star Punch", which can be upgraded into stronger variations by using a Princess Star Color Pen. In the epilogue, she becomes an astronaut, fulfilling her promise to Lala. Her theme color is pink. She introduces herself as "The twinkling star that shines throughout the universe! Cure Star!" (宇宙に輝くキラキラ星！キュアスター！, Sora ni Kagayaku Kirakira Boshi! Kyua Sutā!).
Lala Hagoromo (羽衣 ララ, Hagoromo Rara) / Cure Milky (キュアミルキー, Kyua Mirukī)
Voiced by: Konomi Kohara
Lala is a 13-year-old who is the first alien to become a Pretty Cure. She is an alien from the planet Samaan (サマーン, Samān) who came with Prunce and Fuwa to Earth to find the Pretty Cure and ends up becoming one herself. While her presence on Earth is considered illegal according to space laws, she is allowed to remain on Earth under an alias. While serious and responsible, she sometimes makes mistakes while adjusting to Earth's people and customs. As Cure Milky, her main technique is "Milky Shock", which can be upgraded into stronger variations by using a Princess Star Color Pen. In the epilogue, she returns to Saman and becomes an inspector while helping to improve her home planet. Her theme color is turquoise. She introduces herself as "The milky way stretching across the heavens! Cure Milky!" (天にあまねくミルキーウェイ！キュアミルキー！, Ten ni Amaneku Mirukī Wei! Kyua Mirukī!).
Elena Amamiya (天宮 えれな, Amamiya Erena) / Cure Soleil (キュアソレイユ, Kyua Soreiyu)
Voiced by: Kiyono Yasuno
A popular 14-year-old third-year middle school student with a radiant smile and athletic prowess, known as the "Sun of Mihoshi Town." A hāfu who is Mexican on her father's side, her family owns the Sonrisa Flower Shop, which she works part-time at while looking after her younger siblings. As Cure Soleil, her main technique is "Soleil Shoot", which can be upgraded into stronger variations by using a Princess Star Color Pen. In the epilogue, she becomes a TV language interpreter and provides media coverage of Hikaru's flight into space. Her theme color is yellow. She introduces herself by saying "Light up the sky! With sparkling heat! Cure Soleil!" (宇宙を照らす！灼熱のきらめき！キュアソレイユ！, Uchū o Terasu! Shakunetsu no Kirameki! Kyua Soreiyu!).
Madoka Kaguya (香久矢 まどか, Kaguya Madoka) / Cure Selene (キュアセレーネ, Kyua Serēne)
Voiced by: Mikako Komatsu
A 14-year-old third-year middle school student who is the president of Mihoshi Middle School's student council and is known as the "Moon of Mihoshi Town". Her father works for the government, and her mother is a pianist. She is multi-talented in archery, piano, and flower arrangements, and strives to be ladylike; although she is kind, she can be blunt at times. As Cure Selene, her main technique is "Selene Arrow", which can be upgraded into stronger variations by using a Princess Star Color Pen. In the epilogue, she takes up her dad's job as a space investigator. Her theme color is purple. She introduces herself by saying "Light up the night sky! With the secretive moonlight! Cure Selene!" (夜空に輝く！神秘の月あかり！キュアセレーネ！, Yozora ni Kagayaku! Shinpi no Tsukiakari! Kyua Serēne!).
Yuni (ユニ) / Cure Cosmo (キュアコスモ, Kyua Kosumo)
Voiced by: Sumire Uesaka
A shapeshifting catgirl from Planet Rainbow, whose people were turned to stone as a result of Aiwarn's experiments. Her actual age is unknown because she uses many forms. She uses a perfume to assist with shapeshifting, but regardless of form she still has her ears and tail. She is searching for a way to restore her people by assuming the identities of the phantom thief Blue Cat (ブルーキャット, Burū Kyatto) to take back Planet Rainbow's treasures, the intergalactic pop idol Mao (マオ) to gather information, and Aiwarn's butler Bakenyan (バケニャーン, Bakenyān) (Voiced by: Yōji Ueda) to infiltrate the Notraiders. After becoming a Pretty Cure, Yuni joins Hikaru and the others to search for the Pens. As Cure Cosmo, she wields the Rainbow Perfume, which she uses in her "Cosmo Shining" technique and its "Rainbow Splash" variation using the Princess Star Color Pens. In the epilogue, Planet Rainbow is restored and she is seen with Olyfio as they watch Hikaru launch into space. Her theme colors are blue and rainbow. She introduces herself as "The rainbow spectrum lighting up the galaxy! Cure Cosmo!" (銀河に光る虹色のスペクトル！キュアコスモ！, Ginga ni hikaru nijiiro no supekutoru! Kyua Kosumo!).

=== Starry Sky World ===
Fuwa (フワ)
Voiced by: Hina Kino
A baby fairy with the power to create portals through space, who the Star Princesses created as their "last hope", both as a means of reviving them and stopping Ophiuchus. She normally resides in the Twinkle Book. After the Star Princess Pens are gathered, Fuwa evolves into a unicorn-like fairy, with the Pretty Cure told to help her reach her full potential by acquiring their Twinkle Imagination as part of the Star Princesses' plan to destroy Ophiuchus. Despite learning that absorbing the Cures' Twinkle Imagination would ultimately destroy her, Fuwa sacrifices herself to eliminate Ophiuchus, but fails. She is later revived after the Cures defeat Ophiuchus, but loses her memories and powers. In the epilogue, she regains her powers and memories and reunites with the Cures.
Prunce (プルンス, Purunsu)
Voiced by: Hiroyuki Yoshino
A UFO-like alien who serves the Star Princesses and came to Earth with Lala to seek out the Pretty Cure. He is capable of shapeshifting.
AI (えーあい, Ē Ai)
Voiced by: Miki Itō
The artificial intelligence system of Lala's rocket.
P. P. Abraham (P.P.アブラハム, Aburahamu)
Voiced by: Yutaka Aoyama
An alien from Planet Minitur, who assumed a form of a film director to test the Pretty Cure's determination to have Lala stay on Earth.

==== Star Princesses ====
The Star Princesses (スタープリンセス, Sutā Purinsesu) are 13 princesses who represent each of the 12 Zodiac signs and protect the balance of the universe. Ophiuchus was originally the 13th princess, but betrayed them after disagreeing with their plan to bestow half of their collective power to all life in the form of imagination. When the Notraiders attacked, the Star Princesses used the last of their power to create Fuwa, and afterward were scattered across the universe as the Princess Star Color Pens, which the Pretty Cure and the Notraiders are after.

Taurus (おうし座, Oushi-za)
Voiced by: Ayako Kawasumi
The Star Princess based on Taurus, whose pink Princess Star Color Pen was found on Earth.
Leo (しし座, Shishi-za)
Voiced by: Madoka Yonezawa
The Star Princess based on Leo, whose cyan Princess Star Color Pen was found on Earth.
Libra (てんびん座, Tenbin-za)
Voiced by: Mako
The Star Princess based on Libra, whose yellow Princess Star Color Pen was found on Planet Kennel.
Capricorn (やぎ座, Yagi-za)
Voiced by: Marika Hayashi
The Star Princess based on Capricornus, whose magenta Princess Star Color Pen was in the Notraiders' possession before the Pretty Cure reclaimed it.
Scorpio (さそり座, Sasori-za)
Voiced by: Aya Endō
The Star Princess based on Scorpius, whose orange Princess Star Color Pen was in the Notraiders' possession before the Pretty Cure reclaimed it.
Sagittarius (いて座, Ite-za)
Voiced by: Miki Itō
The Star Princess based on Sagittarius, whose lilac Princess Star Color Pen was found on Planet Zeni.
Virgo (おとめ座, Otome-za)
Voiced by: Yui Kondo
The Star Princess based on Virgo, whose white Princess Star Color Pen was found on Planet Zeni.
Gemini (ふたご座, Futago-za)
Voiced by: Natsu Yorita
The Star Princesses who are twin sisters based on Gemini, whose teal Princess Star Color Pen was found on Planet Rainbow.
Aries (おひつじ座, Ohitsuji-za)
Voiced by: Sachiko Kojima
The Star Princess based on Aries, whose red Princess Star Color Pen was found on Planet Kumarin.
Aquarius (みずがめ座, Mizugame-za)
Voiced by: Kim Hyang-ri
The Star Princess based on Aquarius, whose blue Princess Star Color Pen was found on Planet Aisuno.
Cancer (かに座, Kani-za)
Voiced by: Rie Murakawa
The Star Princess based on Cancer, whose green Princess Star Color Pen was found on Planet Saman.
Pisces (うお座, Uo-za)
Voiced by: Yō Taichi
The Star Princess based on Pisces, whose light pink Princess Star Color Pen was found somewhere floating in space.

=== Notraiders ===
The Notraiders (ノットレイダー, Nottoreidā) are the main antagonists of the series. They originate from the dark and forgotten parts of the universe and are an intergalactic army of space raiders seeking universal dominion by obtaining the power of the Princess Star Color Pens to purge the universe of light. Later, they seek to capture Fuwa and use her as a vessel in Ophiuchus' ritual. Their leading members are based on yōkai from Japanese mythology. Their name is derived from the word "Notto", meaning take over (乗っ取る).

==== Leaders ====
Darknest / Ophiuchus (ダークネスト / へびつかい座, Dākunesuto / Hebitsukai-Za)
Voiced by: Mie Sonozaki
The leader of the Notraiders and the primary antagonist of the series, Ophiuchus is the exiled rogue 13th Star Princess, who became disillusioned with the universe her fellow princesses created when they voted against her to bestow half of their collective power to all life in the form of imagination. This influenced her to turn on them, and they exiled her, but she eventually regained her strength and assumed the identity of Darknest, a snake-armored figure with an Uwabami-like serpent wrapped around her body. She eventually discards her disguise and minions, capturing Fuwa and the Star Princesses to conduct a ritual to unmake the universe and take away its light. After surviving the Star Princesses's gambit to destroy her through Fuwa, Ophiuchus is ultimately defeated by the Pretty Cures and accepts her loss, while vowing to return if things become twisted again.
Garuouga (ガルオウガ, Garuouga)
Voiced by: Satoshi Tsuruoka
The second-in command of the Notraiders, he is an oni-like alien who became Darknest's follower after his planet was destroyed and she promised him power. He possesses immense physical strength and has a bracelet that can increase the commanders' powers. During his final battle, he battles the Cures until he learns of Darknest's identity as Ophiuchus and the one who destroyed his home planet. Garouoga attempts to kill Ophiuchus before she places him and the commanders under her control by twisting their imagination; the Cures purify them before Aiwarn takes them to safety. In the epilogue, he and the other Notraiders are shown to have converted their former headquarters into a botanic garden.

==== Commanders ====
Garuouga's subordinates, who aid in reviving Darknest and each use a different method to battle the Pretty Cures. Garuouga later increases their powers, with Darknest upgrading their abilities further.

Kappard (カッパード, Kappādo)
Voiced by: Yoshimasa Hosoya
A kappa-like commander who wields a lightsaber-like dual blade. He originates from a planet that was destroyed as a result of other races exploiting its naïve people, which led to conflict. This caused Kappard to believe that people from other worlds are incapable of coexisting with each other, and his desire for revenge led him to join the Notraiders. While initially seeking to capture Fuwa by any means, he is also a warrior who considers the Pretty Cures as worthy opponents. After being empowered by Darknest, his blade can now take the form of other weapons by absorbing other peoples' imagination. Given a final chance, he confronts Hikaru by using his own imagination to further power up his weapon, but the Cures manage to defeat him, only for Darknest to take him back to the headquarters. During his final battle, he clashes with the Cures until he discovers Darknest's identity as Ophiuchus. He attempts to kill her with his allies, but she puts them under her control by twisting their imagination. The Cures are able to purify them before Aiwarn takes them to safety. In the epilogue, he and the other Notraiders are shown to have converted their former headquarters into a botanic garden.
Tenjou (テンジョウ, Tenjō)
Voiced by: Aya Endō
A playful tengu-like commander armed with a fan who originated from Planet Guten. She joined the Notraiders after becoming an outcast due to her small nose, since Guten's people value longer noses. Tenjou strategizes her attacks on the Pretty Cures, though she is more interested in the Star Princesses' power than capturing Fuwa. She often use the Notrei as Human chess pieces to fight the Cures, and after receiving an upgrade from Darknest, she gains the ability to seal a person inside a Nottorei by twisting their imagination. As shown in episodes 39, 42 and 43, she has a rivalry with Elena because they have similar pasts of being ostracized. When she attacks her homeland, Elena understands her feelings and attempt to reconcile with her, but she refuses. During her final battle, she clashes with the Cures until she discovers Darknest's identity as Ophiuchus. She attempts to kill her with her allies, but she puts them under her control by twisting their imagination. The Cures are able to purify them before Aiwarn takes them to safety. In the epilogue, she and the other Notraiders are shown to have converted their former headquarters into a botanic garden.
Aiwarn (アイワーン, Aiwān)
Voiced by: Rie Murakawa
A brat Hitotsume-kozō-like commander who is armed with a laser pistol and sees others as subjects in her experiments. She was responsible for petrifying the denizens of Planet Rainbow, and has developed a way to corrupt the Princess Star Color Pens into Dark Pens (ダークペン, Dāku Pen). Aiwarn uses the Dark Pens to create Notriggers from her targets' imaginations, with their strength boosted after Darknest enhances Aiwarn's power. Following the revelation that Bakenyan is one of Yuni's disguises, Aiwarn seeks revenge on her for being kicked out of the Notraiders, while modifying Yuni's spaceship into a personal transforming robot called Aiwarn Robo Unit 16. She makes numerous attempts on Yuni's life until she is stopped from petrifying Planet Uranei's residents, with Yuni apologizing to Aiwarn once realizing she had no home other than with the Notraiders. Aiwarn leaves after declining Yuni's offer to live on Earth with her and the other Cures. During the final battle, she aids the Cures against her former allies, and in the epilogue is shown to have helped restore Planet Rainbow and befriended its people.

==== Grunts ====
Notrei (ノットレイ, Nottorei)
Voiced by: Yoshimitsu Shimoyama, Kenta Tanaka, Kosuke Echigoya, Yu Miyazaki, Yui Kondo, Sachiko Kojima and Kim Hyang-ri
The foot-soldiers of the Notraiders, who are armed with laser blasters. Later on, Tenjou receives power from Darknest and gains the ability to use peoples' imagination to turn them into a giant version of themselves.
Notrigger (ノットリガー, Nottorigā)
Voiced by: Yoshimitsu Shimoyama
Aiwarn's monsters, which she creates using a Dark Pen. Each Notrigger's form is based on an object or strong desire from a targeted person's imagination.

=== Hoshina family ===
Harukichi Hoshina (星奈 春吉, Hoshina Harukichi)
Voiced by: Mitsuru Ogata
Hikaru's grandfather, who enforces strict rules around the house.
Terumi Hoshina (星奈 輝美, Hoshina Terumi)
Voiced by: Sachiko Kojima
Hikaru's mother, who is a mangaka.
Youko Hoshina (星奈 陽子, Hoshina Yōko)
Voiced by: Yōko Asagami
Hikaru's grandmother.
Youichi Hoshina (星奈 陽一, Hoshina Yōichi)
Voiced by: Akio Otsuka
Hikaru's father, who works overseas studying aliens and cryptids.
Yeti (イエティ, Ieti)
Voiced by: Yōhei Tadano
Hikaru's pet dog.

=== Lala's family ===
Toto (トト, Toto)
Voiced by: Toshihiko Seki
Lala's father, who is an AI researcher.
Kaka (カカ, Kaka)
Voiced by: Fumi Hirano
Lala's mother, who is a doctor of rocket engineering.
Lolo (ロロ, Roro)
Voiced by: Sōma Saitō
Lala's older twin brother.

=== Amamiya family ===
Carlos (カルロス, Karurosu)
Voiced by: Kentaro Tone
Elena's father, who is Mexican and the owner of Sonrisa.
Kaede Amamiya (天宮 かえで, Amamiya Kaede)
Voiced by: Ayahi Takagaki
Elena's mother, who is Japanese and an interpreter.
Touma Amamiya (天宮 とうま, Amamiya Tōma), Reina Amamiya (天宮 れいな, Amamiya Reina), Takuto Amamiya (天宮 たくと, Amamiya Takuto), Ikuto Amamiya (天宮 いくと, Amamiya Ikuto), Anna Amamiya (天宮 あんな, Amamiya Anna)
Voiced by: Yui Kondo, Mai Nishikawa, Natsu Yorita, Anzu Haruno
Elena's siblings.

=== Kaguya family ===
Fuyuki Kaguya (香久矢 冬貴, Kaguya Fuyuki)
Voiced by: Ken Narita
Madoka's stern father, who works for the government and perceives aliens as a threat while forbidding his family from keeping secrets.
Mitsuka Kaguya (香久矢 満佳, Kaguya Mitsuka)
Voiced by: Hekiru Shiina
Madoka's mother, who is a famous pianist.

=== Yuni's family ===
Olyfio (オリーフィオ, Orīfio)
Voiced by: Kōki Miyata
The queen of Planet Rainbow, who was petrified along with the rest of its denizens but was later revived.

=== Others ===
Drams (ドラムス, Doramusu)
Voiced by: Subaru Kimura
A dragon-like alien from the planet Zeni.
Yanyan (ヤンヤン)
Voiced by: Asuka Nishi
A hitchhiking hermit crab alien from the planet Pururun who has a yellow bucket on her back.
Tatsunori Karube (軽部タツノリ, Karube Tatsunori)
Voiced by: Junya Enoki
Hikaru and Lala's classmate.
Sakurako Himenojo (姫ノ城桜子, Himenojō Sakurako)
Voiced by: Yō Taichi
Madoka's classmate.
Yumika Nasu (那須ゆみか, Nasu Yumika)
Voiced by: Makoto Koichi
Madoka's good friend.
Nodoka Hanadera (花寺のどか, Hanadera Nodoka) / Cure Grace (キュアグレース, Kyua Gurēsu)
Voiced by: Aoi Yūki
A girl who is the main protagonist of Healin' Good Pretty Cure and the pink-colored Pretty Cure of Flowers.
Latte (ラテ, Rate)
Voiced by: Haruka Shiraishi
A brown dog-like fairy from Healin' Good Pretty Cure who is the Young Princess of the Healing Garden (ヒーリングガーデンの幼い王女さま)

=== Movie characters ===
Piton (ピトン, Piton)
Voiced by: Etsuko Kozakura
A chick-like alien who appears in Precure Miracle Universe. He is from Planet Miracle and develops Miracle Lights. Yango framed him in the factory's malfunction, and he seeks the Cures' help to help him clear his name. After Yango's defeat, he is appointed as a maker of Miracle Lights.
Yango (ヤンゴ, Yango)
Voiced by: Yuki Kaji
A manipulative and deceptively crow-like alien from Planet Miracle, who is the main antagonist of Precure Miracle Universe. Working for the president at Planet Miracle to end the threat around the universe, he was sent to bring Piton and the Cures in because he believes they are responsible for the disappearance of the Miracle Lights. It is later revealed that he caused the factory's malfunction and framed Piton for it. The Cures help Piton expose his corruption and gather their feelings to purify him, expelling the darkness inside him.
President (大統領, Daitōryō)
Voiced by: Yuji Tanaka
An owl-like alien and head of Planet Miracle.
UMA (ユーマ, Yūma)
A star-like alien appearing in Star Twinkle Pretty Cure the Movie: These Feeling within The Song of Stars. She sings instead of speaking and is a "Star Drop". She befriends the Cures before the alien hunters target her for bounty. When Burn attempts to capture her, she goes berserk and becomes a massive planet. Hikaru and Lala's song is able to reach her, and she takes on a humanoid form resembling both of them before disappearing.
Mary Anne (メリー・アン, Merī An)
Voiced by: Rina Chinen
A dog-like alien appearing in Star Twinkle Pretty Cure the Movie: These Feeling within The Song of Stars. She is a Starry Sky police detective who is sent to arrest Yuni. She can be a little over the top at times. She also appears in episode 36.
Gyro III, Hydro, Burn, Dive, Chop (ジャイロIII, ハイドロ, バーン, ダイブ, チョップ, Jairo III, Haidoro, Bān, Daibu, Choppu)
Voiced by: Takayuki Hamatsu, Yui Ishikawa, Shunsuke Sakuya, Jin Katagiri, and Ryūsuke Komakine
A gang of five alien hunters targeting UMA who serve as the main antagonists of Star Twinkle Pretty Cure the Movie: These Feeling within The Song of Stars. They invade Earth to capture UMA to collect a bounty, and the Cures confront them to protect UMA. When Burn attempts to capture UMA, it causes her to go berserk. After UMA's departure, Mary Anne incarcerates them.

== Media ==
=== Anime ===
Star Twinkle PreCure was announced on November 28, 2018, following a trademark filing reported on October 5, 2018. The series is being directed by Hiroaki Miyamoto and written by Isao Murayama, with character designs by Akira Takahashi (Suite PreCure & Doki Doki! PreCure) and music by Yuki Hayashi (Kirakira PreCure a la Mode & Hugtto! PreCure) and Asami Tachibana. The series aired in Japan from February 3, 2019, to January 26, 2020, succeeding the previous series Hugtto! PreCure in its initial timeslot. In addition, a PreCure Horoscope (プリキュア星座占い) by Arisu Yamada is shown at the end of every episode which features three lucky zodiac signs while in the final episode, Cure Star and Cure Grace tells the viewers that everyone is lucky.

=== Music ===
==== Opening ====
Song	Artist	Episodes
"Sparkle☆彡Star☆Twinkle PreCure" (キラリ☆彡スター☆トゥインクルプリキュア)	Rie Kitagawa	All (except episode 48)

==== Endings ====
Song	Artist	Episodes
"Papepipu☆Romantic" (パぺピプ☆ロマンチック)	Chihaya Yoshitake	1 – 5, 6 – 8 (reaired ver.), 9 – 20
"Please Tell me...! Twinkle!☆" (教えて...! トゥインクル☆)	Chihaya Yoshitake	21 – 34, 35 – 38 (reaired ver.), 39 – 49, Super Sentai Movie Party (Kiramager ver.)
"WINkle! Pretty Cure Miracle Universe☆" (WINくる!プリキュアミラクルユニバース☆)	Rie Kitagawa	6 – 8, PreCure Miracle Universe
"Twinkle Stars"	Cure Star (Eimi Naruse), Cure Milky (Konomi Kohara), Cure Soleil (Kiyono Yasuno), Cure Selene (Mikako Komatsu), Cure Cosmo (Sumire Uesaka)	35–38
"Twinkle Stars"	Rina Chinen	Star Twinkle PreCure the Movie: These Feelings Within The Song of Stars

==== Insert Songs ====
Song	Artist	Episodes
"Star Color Pendant! Color Charge!" (スターカラーペンダント! カラーチャージ！)	Cure Star (Eimi Naruse), Cure Milky (Konomi Kohara), Cure Soleil (Kiyono Yasuno), Cure Selene (Mikako Komatsu), Cure Cosmo (Sumire Uesaka)	All
"Sparkle☆彡Star☆Twinkle PreCure" (キラリ☆彡スター☆トゥインクルプリキュア)	Cure Star (Eimi Naruse), Cure Milky (Konomi Kohara), Cure Soleil (Kiyono Yasuno), Cure Selene (Mikako Komatsu), Cure Cosmo (Sumire Uesaka)	49
"Twinkle Stars"	Cure Star (Eimi Naruse), Cure Milky (Konomi Kohara), Cure Soleil (Kiyono Yasuno), Cure Selene (Mikako Komatsu), Cure Cosmo (Sumire Uesaka)	Star Twinkle PreCure the Movie: These Feelings Within The Song of Stars
"Cosmic☆Mystery☆Girl" (コズミック☆ミステリー☆ガール)	Cure Cosmo (Sumire Uesaka)	15, 23, 24
"The Constellation's Power" (星座のチカラ)	Chihaya Yoshitake	Star Twinkle PreCure the Movie: These Feelings Within The Song of Stars

=== Films ===
The characters appear in the theatrical crossover film Pretty Cure Miracle Universe (映画プリキュアミラクルユニバース), released on March 16, 2019, alongside characters from Hugtto! PreCure and Kirakira PreCure a la Mode.

An anime film titled Star Twinkle Pretty Cure the Movie: These Feeling Within the Song of Stars (映画スター☆トゥインクルプリキュア 星の歌に想いをこめて, Eiga Sutā Touinkuru Purikyua Hoshi no Uta ni Omoi o Komete) was released on October 19, 2019. Yūta Tanaka is directing the film.

Pretty Cure Miracle Leap: A Strange Day With Everyone! (映画 プリキュアミラクルリープ みんなとの不思議な1日, Eiga Purikyua Mirakuru Rīpu: Min'na to no Fushigi na Ichinichi), was released on October 31, 2020.

=== Manga ===
A manga adaptation illustrated by Futago Kamikita began serialization in Kodansha's Nakayoshi shoujo magazine from February 1, 2019.

== Reception ==
Gadget Tsūshin listed Hikaru's catchphrase "Kirayaba~☆" in their 2019 anime buzzwords list.

Cosplay marathoner Mitsunobu Saita ran in the 2019 Kobe Marathon as Cure Cosmo.

Preceded by Hug! Pretty Cure	Star Twinkle PreCure; 2019–2020	Succeeded by Healin' Good Pretty Cure
