= Moga Mogami =

Japanese singer (born 1989)

- 最上 もが
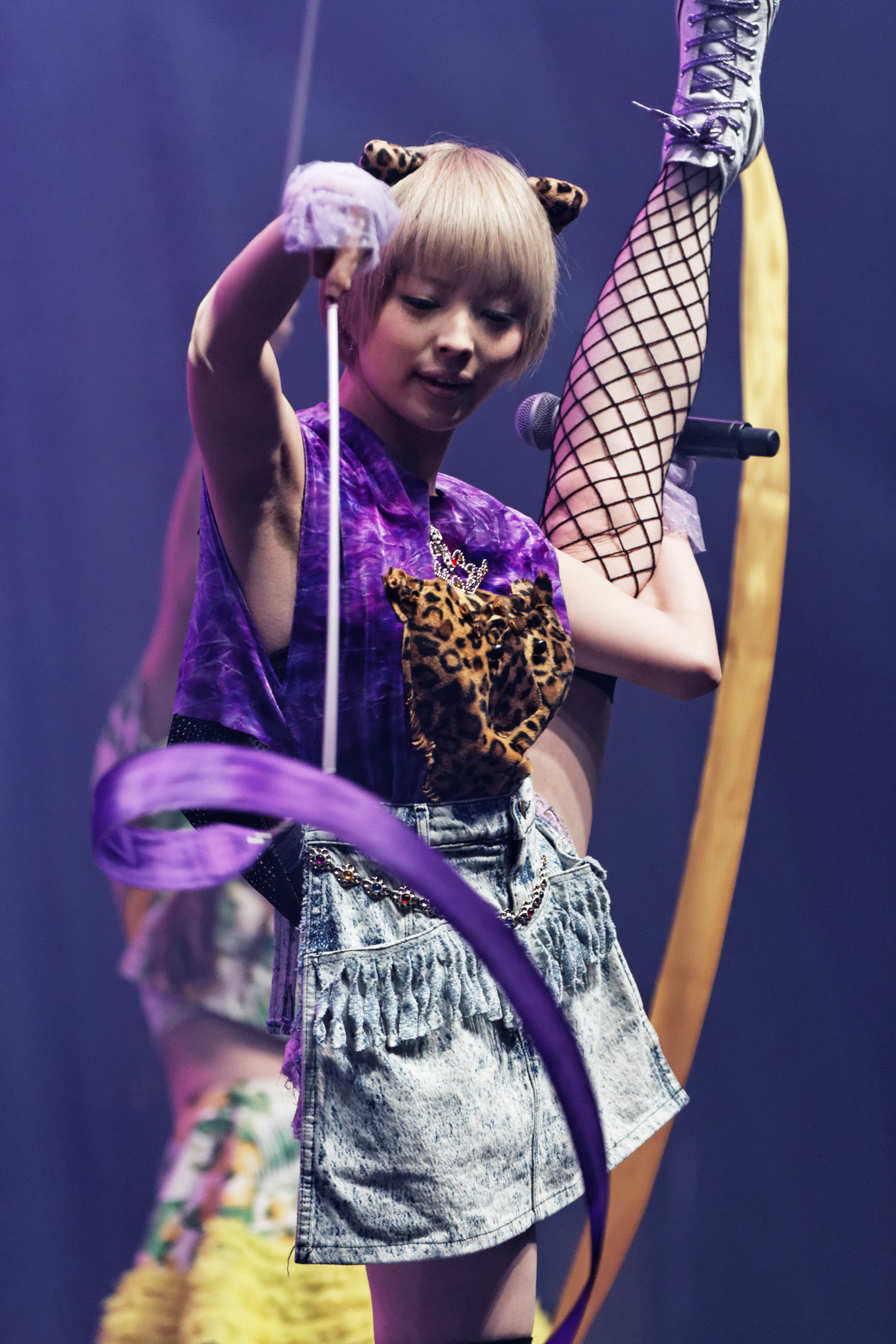
- At Japan Expo in 2013
- Born: February 25, 1989 (age 37); Tokyo, Japan
- Other names: Moga-chan; Mogatanpe (もがたんぺ); Gāmō (がーもー)
- Occupations: Singer; tarento; model
- Years active: 2011–present
- Agent: DearStage Inc.
- Notable work: "New Romantic"
- Television: Ultraman Ginga S; Jūhan Shuttai!
- Height: 162 cm (5 ft 4 in)
- Children: 1
- Awards: NEXT Gravure Queen Battle victory

Moga Mogami (最上 もが, Mogami Moga; born 25 February 1989, in Tokyo) is a Japanese idol. She is a former member of Dempagumi.inc and is nicknamed Moga-chan (もがちゃん). (Note: Until around the spring of 2015 "Mogatanpe" was her official nickname: 2015年3月24日時点の公式プロフィール (Internet Archive).) Her catchphrase at Dempagumi.inc was "the golden heresy who runs in the universe", (Note: Until the fall of 2012 "Today I will also do my best!" became her official catchphrase: 2012年10月16日時点の公式プロフィール (Internet Archive).) and her colour was purple.

== Personal life ==
In 2017, Mogami came out as bisexual. In 2020, She announced that she was pregnant with her first child. She gave birth to her first child, a daughter, in May 2021.

== Filmography ==
=== Variety ===
Run	Title	Network
5 Oct 2013 – 23 Mar 2014	Ōkubo jā Night	TBS

=== TV dramas ===
Run	Title	Role	Network	Notes	Ref.
6–20 Oct 2012	Kai-soku Shōjo	Moe	NHK-E		
24 Jan 2013	Apoyan: Hashiru Kokusai Kūkō	Lovely Pafupafu	TBS	Episode 2	
15 Jul – 23 Dec 2014	Ultraman Ginga S	Android One-Zero / Mana	TX		
12 Apr – 14 Jun 2016	Jūhan Shuttai!	Rine	TBS		
16 Sep 2018	Magic x Warrior Magi Majo Pures!	Eri Kawaguchi	TV Tokyo	Episode 25	
2 Feb – 16 Feb 2019	Ultraman New Generation Chronicle	Mana	TV Tokyo	Episode 5-7	

=== Radio ===
Run	Title	Network
13 Apr 2017 –	Appare yatte māsu!	MBS Radio

=== Internet ===
Run	Title	Website	Ref.
11 Apr 2016 –	Mogami Moga no mo ga Maga!	AbemaTV	

=== Films ===
Date	Title	Role	Distributor	Ref.
14 Mar 2015	Ultraman Ginga S The Movie	Mana	Shochiku	
22 Sep 2016	Yamikin Ushijima-kun Part3	Mone	Toho=S-D-P	
22 Oct 2016	Yamikin Ushijima-kun The Final	Mone	Toho=S-D-P	
2019	Kurogarasu Part 1			
2019	Kurogarasu Part 2			

=== Advertisements ===
Run	Brand	Product	Notes	Ref.
	Wacoal	Shakitto Bra 2013 A/W	Only her top performances, CM songs are Dempagumi.inc is in charge	
	Mobage	Knights of Glory Gekitō Griffon, Sarani 4-ri no Kizuna		
Oct 2014 – Jan 2015	Shueisha	Terra Formars Original Image Movie (Moga Mogami)	Internet	
Mar 2016 –	GCrest	Yume Ōkoku to Nemureru 100-ri no Ōji-sama Ōji-sama ni Melomelo		
Apr 2016 –	Sony Interactive Entertainment	PlayStation 4+tofubeats+Moga Mogami "Don! Don! Don't Stop Lineup!"	Internet	

=== Image modelling ===
Year	Title	Publisher	Ref.
2014	Photo booth Mew	IMS Corporation	
2015	Browse EX, Nail Nail, Beauty Minds	BCL Company	
2017	Une Nana Cool × Yuki Tokuda Collaboration Non Wire Brassiere, Shorts, Hara Maki, Pajama Ambassador	Une Nana Cool	

=== Music videos ===
Date	Artist	Title	Ref.
Sep 2015	Yūshoku Hot	"1903"	
Sep 2015	Yūshoku Hot	"1903 - Moga Mogami Daihon nashi Version"	
Mar 2018	SKY-HI	"何様"	
Dec 2018	Kano (鹿乃)	"「Q」&「A」"	

== Bibliography ==
=== Photo albums ===
Date	Title	Publisher	Crew	Notes	Code	Ref.
13 Mar 2015	Super Heroine Shashin-shū: Android One-Zero×Moga Mogami	Shogakukan	Tsuburaya Productions (supervisor)	A cosplay photo collection reproduced with a photograph of a downward shoot taking a day of "Android One-Zero" which Mogami played in the drama Ultraman Ginga S	ISBN 9784091032324	
10 Dec 2015	Moga	Shueisha	Tomoki Kuwashima (photographer)	Moga Mogami's first photo book	ISBN 9784087807738	
24 Oct 2016	Dempagumi.inc Art Book (1) "Poison"	Shogakukan	Leslie Kee (photographer)		ISBN 9784096822326	

=== Electronic photo albums ===
Date	Title	Publisher	Notes
27 May 2017	Gekkan Dempagumi.inc×Yasumasa Yonehara (Moga Mogami Edition)	Shinchosha	Gekkan series

=== Interviews ===
Date	Title	Publisher	Code	Ref.
18 Mar 2016	Yomu Idol Magazine Idol And Read 006 "Moga Mogami 'Kiniro no Itan-ji' Tanjō Monogatari"	Shinko Music Entertainment	ISBN 9784401771424	
19 Mar 2016	Overture No.006	Tokuma Shoten	ISBN 9784197104390	

=== Magazines ===
Date	Title	Issues	Publisher	Code	Notes	Ref.
	Kera	Mar and Jul 2014, Sep and Nov 2015, May and Nov 2016	Mall of TV		Cover model	
19 Apr 2017	Saijō moga no mo ga Maga!		Shodensha	ISBN 9784396430788	A magazine derived from the programme with the same name above	
