= Ultraman Ginga S =

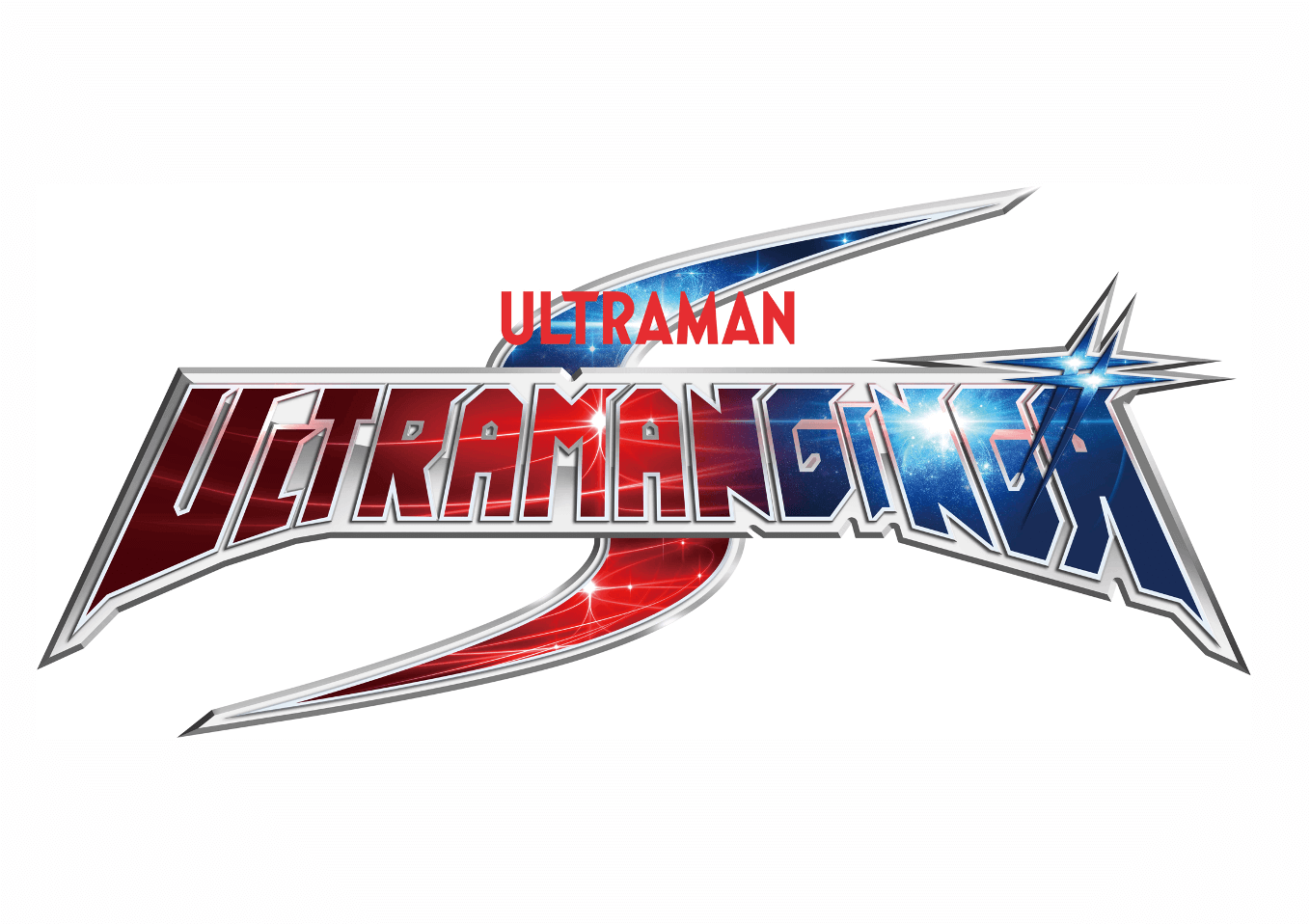
- Genre: Tokusatsu; Superhero; Action/Adventure; Sci-Fi; Kaiju; Kyodai Hero
- Written by: Yūji Kobayashi; Takao Nakano; Akio Miyoshi; Aya Takei; Hirotoshi Kobayashi; Hisako Kurosawa; Sotaro Hayashi
- Directed by: Koichi Sakamoto; Yoshikazu Ishii; Kiyotaka Taguchi; Kazuya Konaka
- Starring: Takuya Negishi; Kiyotaka Uji; Yukari Taki; Takahiro Kato; Takuya Kusakawa; Ryuichi Ohura; Moga Mogami; Rina Koike; Hinata Yamada; Yōsuke Saitō; Mirai Yamamoto
- Music by: Takao Konishi
- Country of origin: Japan
- Original language: Japanese
- No. of episodes: 16

Production
- Producer: Eiji Kikuchi
- Running time: 30 mins
- Production company: Tsuburaya Productions

Original release
- Network: TXN (TV Tokyo)
- Release: July 15 – December 23, 2014

Related
- Ultraman Ginga; Ultraman X

Ultraman Ginga S (ウルトラマンギンガS, Urutoraman Ginga Esu) is a Japanese television series produced by Tsuburaya Productions and a sequel to Ultraman Ginga, as well as part of the New Ultraman Retsuden programming block on TV Tokyo. It is the 18th entry (27th overall) in the Ultra Series.

== Story ==
After two years Ultraman Ginga left Earth, and Hikaru returns to Japan once again after gaining a strange vision during his adventure in Mexico. Once he's arrived, he discovered a new threat in the form of Alien Chibull Exceller, an alien who steals Victorium (ビクトリウム, Bikutoriumu), Android One-Zero, his android enforcer and his alien minions. Alarmed by the theft of the Victorium, the Victorian (ビクトリアン, Bikutorian), a group of ancient civilians that live underground sent Sho to retrieve it and bestow him an ancient relic, the Victory Lancer (ビクトリーランサー, Bikutorī Ransā) that transforms him into their protector, Ultraman Victory (ウルトラマンビクトリー, Urutoraman Bikutorī).

Hikaru was dragged into the battle again after being recruited into UPG (Ultra Party Guardians), an attack team formed by the International Defense Forces after various paranormal incidents. He reunites with Ultraman Ginga and joins forces with Sho to take down Exceller and his minions. Ultraman Taro returns as well, having sensed the new threat and supports Ginga through the Strium Brace (ストリウムブレス, Sutoriumu Buresu), which allows him to become Ultraman Ginga Strium (ウルトラマンギンガストリウム, Urutoraman Ginga Sutoriumu) with the power of the 6 Ultra Brothers.

As the series progressed, it was revealed that Exceller's true agenda is to revive Dark Lugiel from the moon, desiring his body to take over the galaxy. He has revived once again as Victor Lugiel after fusing himself with the UPG's Victorium Cannon, their ultimate weapon but halfway through the invasion, the real Dark Lugiel reveals himself, kills Exceller, and contemplates restarting his plan to freeze all lifeforms. He was defeated once again by Ultraman Ginga and Ultraman Victory, after Exceller's former android One-Zero sabotages Victor Lugiel's inner system at the cost of her own. After the battle, Taro leave the Earth once more and Hikaru and Sho parted ways.

== Episodes ==
No.	Title	Directed by	Written by	Original release date
1	"Power to Open Up"; Transliteration: "Kirihiraku Chikara" (Japanese: 切り拓く力)	Koichi Sakamoto	Yūji Kobayashi	July 15, 2014
2	"Ginga vs. Victory"; Transliteration: "Ginga Tai Bikutorī" (Japanese: ギンガ対ビクトリー)	Koichi Sakamoto	Takao Nakano	July 22, 2014
3	"The Lone Warrior"; Transliteration: "Kokō no Senshi" (Japanese: 孤高の戦士)	Koichi Sakamoto	Akio Miyoshi	July 29, 2014
4	"The Meaning of Strength"; Transliteration: "Tsuyosa no Imi" (Japanese: 強さの意味)	Yoshikazu Ishii	Aya Takei	August 5, 2014
5	"Friend and Devil"; Transliteration: "Nakama to Akuma" (Japanese: 仲間と悪魔)	Yoshikazu Ishii	Hirotoshi Kobayashi	August 12, 2014
6	"Forgotten Past"; Transliteration: "Wasuresarareta Kako" (Japanese: 忘れ去られた過去)	Kiyotaka Taguchi	Hisako Kurosawa	August 19, 2014
7	"Activate! Magnewave Operation"; Transliteration: "Hatsudō! Magunewēbu Sakusen" (Japanese: 発動! マグネウェーブ作戦)	Kiyotaka Taguchi	Sotaro Hayashi	August 26, 2014
8	"Desperate Battle for Sunrise"; Transliteration: "Asayake no Shitō" (Japanese: 朝焼けの死闘)	Kiyotaka Taguchi	Yūji Kobayashi	September 2, 2014
9	"Life to Regain"; Transliteration: "Torimodosu Inochi" (Japanese: 取り戻す命)	Yoshikazu Ishii	Hisako Kurosawa	November 4, 2014
10	"Holy Sword of the Future"; Transliteration: "Mirai e no Seiken" (Japanese: 未来への聖剣)	Yoshikazu Ishii	Akio Miyoshi	November 11, 2014
11	"Gan-Q's Tears"; Transliteration: "Gankyū no Namida" (Japanese: ガンQの涙)	Kiyotaka Taguchi	Takao Nakano	November 18, 2014
12	"To Meet You"; Transliteration: "Kimi ni Au Tame ni" (Japanese: 君に会うために)	Kiyotaka Taguchi	Sotaro Hayashi	November 25, 2014
13	"Split! UPG"; Transliteration: "Bunretsu! Yū Pī Jī" (Japanese: 分裂! UPG)	Kazuya Konaka	Aya Takei	December 2, 2014
14	"Resurrection of Lugiel"; Transliteration: "Fukkatsu no Rugieru" (Japanese: 復活のルギエル)	Kazuya Konaka	Yūji Kobayashi	December 9, 2014
15	"Adventure Called Life"; Transliteration: "Inochi to Iu Na no Bōken" (Japanese: 命という名の冒険)	Koichi Sakamoto	Hirotoshi Kobayashi	December 16, 2014
16	"Battle for Tomorrow"; Transliteration: "Asu o Kaketa Tatakai" (Japanese: 明日を懸けた戦い)	Koichi Sakamoto	Takao Nakano	December 23, 2014

== Film ==
Ultraman Ginga S The Movie (劇場版 ウルトラマンギンガS 決戦! ウルトラ10勇士!!, Gekijōban Urutoraman Ginga Esu Kessen! Urutora Jū Yūshi!!; Ultraman Ginga S the Movie: Showdown! The 10 Ultra Warriors!) premiered on March 15, 2015. Chronologically, it takes place between the final episode and Ultra Fight Victory.

== Cast ==
- Hikaru Raido (礼堂 ヒカル, Raidō Hikaru): Takuya Negishi (根岸 拓哉, Negishi Takuya)
- Sho (ショウ, Shō): Kiyotaka Uji (宇治 清高, Uji Kiyotaka)
- Arisa Sugita (杉田 アリサ, Sugita Arisa): Yukari Taki (滝 裕可里, Taki Yukari)
- Gouki Matsumoto (松本 ゴウキ, Matsumoto Gōki): Takahiro Kato (加藤 貴宏, Katō Takahiro)
- Tomoya Ichijoji (一条寺 友也, Ichijōji Tomoya): Takuya Kusakawa (草川 拓弥, Kusakawa Takuya)
- Yoshiaki Jinno (陣野 義昭, Jinno Yoshiaki): Ryuichi Ohura (大浦 龍宇一, Ōura Ryūichi)
- Masaki Koyama (神山 政紀, Kōyama Masaki): Kohki Okada (岡田 浩暉, Okada Kōki)
- Android One-Zero/Mana (アンドロイド・ワンゼロ/マナ, Andoroido Wan Zero/Mana): Moga Mogami (最上 もが, Mogami Moga)
- Sakuya (サクヤ): Rina Koike (小池 里奈, Koike Rina)
- Lepi (レピ, Repi): Hinata Yamada (山田 日向, Yamada Hinata)
- Hiyori (ヒヨリ): Meiku Harukawa (春川 芽生, Harukawa Meiku)
- Kamushin (カムシン): Yôsuke Saitô (斉藤 洋介, Saitō Yōsuke)
- Queen Kisara (キサラ女王, Kisara-joō): Mirai Yamamoto (山本 未來, Yamamoto Mirai)

=== Voice cast ===
- Ultraman Ginga, Dark Lugiel (ダークルギエル, Dāku Rugieru): Tomokazu Sugita (杉田 智和, Sugita Tomokazu)
- Ultraman Taro (ウルトラマンタロウ, Urutoraman Tarō): Hiroya Ishimaru (石丸 博也, Ishimaru Hiroya)
- Alien Chibull "Exceller" (チブル星人 エクセラー, Chiburu Seijin Ekuserā): Takuya Eguchi (江口 拓也, Eguchi Takuya)
- Alien Guts "Vorst" (ガッツ星人 ボルスト, Gattsu Seijin Borusuto): Holly Kaneko (金子 はりい, Kaneko Harii)
- Ginga Spark (ギンガスパーク, Ginga Supāku): Yoshihisa Kawahara (川原 慶久, Kawahara Yoshihisa)

=== Guest cast ===
- Misuzu Isurugi (石動 美鈴, Isurugi Misuzu; 9, 16): Mio Miyatake (宮武 美桜, Miyatake Mio)
- Chigusa Kuno (久野 千草, Kuno Chigusa; 12, 16): Kirara (雲母)
- Takeru (タケル; 12, 16): TAKERU
- Chiaki (チアキ; 12, 16): Chiaki Seshimo (瀬下 千晶, Seshimo Chiaki)
- Kenta Watarai (渡会 健太, Watarai Kenta; 16): Mizuki Ohno (大野 瑞生, Ōno Mizuki)

== Songs ==
Opening theme

- "Eiyū no Uta" (英雄の詩; "The Song of Hero")
  - Lyrics & Composition: Toshihiko Takamizawa (高見沢 俊彦, Takamizawa Toshihiko)
  - Arrangement: Toshihiko Takamizawa with Yuichiro Honda (本田 優一郎, Honda Yūichirō)
  - Artist: The Alfee
  - Episodes: 1–8 (Verse 1), 9–16 (Verse 2)

Ending theme

- Kirameku Mirai ~Yume no Ginga e~ (キラメク未来 〜夢の銀河へ〜; "Sparkling Future ~To the Galaxy of Dreams~")
  - Artist: Voyager feat. Ultraman Ginga (Tomokazu Sugita)
  - Episodes: 1–8 (Verse 1), 9–16 (Verse 2)

Insert theme

- "Ultraman Victory no Uta" (ウルトラマンビクトリーの歌, Urutoraman Bikutorī no Uta; "The Song of Ultraman Victory")
  - Lyrics: Sei Okazaki (岡崎 聖, Okazaki Sei)
  - Composition & Arrangement: Takao Konishi
  - Artist: Voyager
  - Episodes: 1–2, 4, 10
- "Ultraman Ginga no Uta" (ウルトラマンギンガの歌, Urutoraman Ginga no Uta; "The Song of Ultraman Ginga")
  - Lyrics: Hideki Tama (田靡 秀樹, Tama Hideki), Sei Okazaki
  - Composition & Arrangement: Takao Konishi
  - Artist: Voyager with Chisa (千紗) (Girl Next Door), Maria Haruna (マリア春菜), Hiroaki Takeuchi (竹内 浩明, Takeuchi Hiroaki), Hikaru (Takuya Negishi), Misuzu (Mio Miyatake), Kenta (Mizuki Ohno), Chigusa (Kirara), Tomoya (Takuya Kusakawa)
  - Episodes: 1, 3, 15
- "Ultraman Ginga no Uta ~Chigusa ver.~" (ウルトラマンギンガの歌 〜千草ver.〜, Urutoraman Giga no Uta ~Chigusa Bājon~; "The Song of Ultraman Ginga ~Chigusa ver.~")
  - Artist: Chigusa Kuno (Kirara) feat. Voyager
  - Episodes: 12–13, 16

== International broadcast ==
- In the United States, the show aired on Toku beginning February 24, 2018, on weekdays at 7:30 p.m. EST.

== See also ==
- Ultra Series - Complete list of official Ultraman-related shows
- Ultraman Ginga - Previous season of the show
