= Rina Koike =

Japanese actress (born 1993)

- Born: September 3, 1993 (age 33); Tochigi Prefecture, Japan
- Occupations: Actress, model
- Years active: 2004–present
- Height: 156 cm (5 ft 1 in)

Rina Koike (小池 里奈, Koike Rina) (born September 3, 1993, Tochigi Prefecture, Japan) is a Japanese gravure idol and actress affiliated with Twin Planet. Koike first debuted as a junior idol in 2003. As an actress, Koike has appeared as Sailor Luna in Pretty Guardian Sailor Moon (2003) and Shizuka Nomura in Kamen Rider Kiva (2008).

== Career ==
In the early 2000s, Koike auditioned for Hello! Project Kids but did not pass the audition. When she was 9 years old, while visiting Tokyo with her family, she was scouted at a kissaten in an Isetan store. She then started a junior idol career with the DVD Big Brother at age 10, when she was in 4th grade. In 2004, she was cast in her first television drama role as Sailor Luna in Pretty Guardian Sailor Moon. She also played the role of Shizuka on the 2008 Kamen Rider Series, Kamen Rider Kiva. In early 2011, she starred in the short TV drama Onegai Kanaete Versailles (おねがいかなえてヴェルサイユ "Fulfill My Wish Versailles"), alongside visual kei metal band Versailles.

After graduating from Asia University in 2016, Koike took a two-year break from the entertainment industry to spend time studying English in New Zealand and Australia.

== Filmography ==
=== Movies ===
Year	Title	Role
2005	Einstein Girl	
2006	Aogeba tôtoshi	Yōko Koike
2007	Town of Evening Calm, Country of Cherry Blossoms	young Kyoka Ota
2008	Kamen Rider Kiva: King of the Castle in the Demon World	Shizuka Nomura
2008	Kamen Rider Den-O & Kiva: Climax Deka	Shizuka Nomura
2008	Guuguu Datte Neko de Aru	young Kojima Asako
2008	Aozora ponchi	Nohara Tamae
2009	Sho no Michi	Miki Tanmachi
2013	Gokudo no Tsuma-tachi Neo	Sakura Nishizawa
2013	Niryu Shosetsuka	Ai Kobayashi
2014	Girl's Blood	Mayu
2015	Ultraman Ginga S The Movie	Sakuya
2015	Shiro Majo Gakuen Owari to Hajimari	Rina Kinugasa
2020	Blue Heaven wo Kimi ni	

=== TV Dramas ===
Year	Title	Role	Network	Other notes
2004	Pretty Guardian Sailor Moon	Sailor Luna	CBC	26 episodes later
2005	Koisuru ni chiyōbi "Tokyo Tower"		BS-i	
2005	Omiya-san 4	Mizuho Yasuda	TV Asahi	Episode 8
2005	Onna to Ai to Mystery -Kansatsu-i Hazuki Shinomiya shitaihakataru 6	Rika Komuro	TV Tokyo	
2005	Keishichō Sōsa-ikka 9 gakari	Junko Kokonoe (daughter of Tsunehiko Watase and Yuko Kotegawa)	Monday Golden TV Asahi	
2005	Taxi Driver's Mystery Diary 21	Mina Wakabayashi	Monday Golden TV Asahi	
2006	Kuitan	Rei Kinoshita	NTV	
2006	Kuitan Special `Hong Kong zenbu tabechauzo!'-Hen	Rei Kinoshita	NTV	
2006	Kaidan Shin Mimibukuro 5 Series	Aya Sato	BS-i	
2006	Shibō Suitei Jikoku	Yuki Watanabe	Fuji TV	
2006	14-sai no Haha	Sayaka Nagasaki	NTV	
2007	Tōkyō ekiowasuremonoazukarisho	young Chiaki Satomura	Monday Golden TV Asahi	
2007	Kuitan 2	Rei Kinoshita	NTV	
2007	Kētai shōjo ~ koi no kagai jugyō ~	Momoka Fujimiya		In addition to family theater
2008	Kamen Rider Kiva	Shizuka Nomura	TV Asahi	
2008	Fushigi shōjo Urara Kato	Urara Kato	TV Tokyo	
2008	Keishichō Sōsa-ikka 9 gakari	clerk	TV Asahi	
2009	Challenged	Hiyo Okudera	NHK-G	
2010	TV Tokyo kaikyoku 45 shūnenkinen drama special: "Sunchine Boy"	Tsukada Chinatsu	TV Tokyo	
2010	Sandaime Akechi Kogorou Kobayashi 〜 Kyō mo meichi ga korosa reru 〜	Kobayashi	MBS	
2010	Rei no ryoku-sha Oda giri Kyoko no uso 7-wa, 9-wa	Shōko Toda	TV Asahi	
2011	Onegai Kanaete Versailles		MBS/TV Kanagawa	
2012	Shiritsu Bakaleya Koukou	Yuma Arisaka	NTV	Episode 9
2012	Houkago wa Mystery Totomo ni 5-kai-hyō/ ura	Mina Kato	TBS	
2012	Kuro no jokyōshi (or "Kuro no Onna Kyoshi")	Ai Ishikawa	TBS	Episode 6
2012	Tokumei Tantei	Hosaka Asami	TV Asahi	Episodes 3,6 and 8
2013	Drama tokubetsu kikaku `Haha. Wagako e'	Aqua	MBS	
2013	Keiji 110-kiro	Akira Mikami	TV Asahi	Episode 5
2013	Engawa Keiji Monday Golden	Chiaki Onoda	TBS	
2014	Sailor Zombie	Arina	TV Tokyo	
2014	Ultraman Ginga S	Sakuya	TV Tokyo	
2014	Sutekina Sen Taxi			
2015	Ultra Fight Victory	Sakuya	TV Tokyo	
2025	Girls Remix in Halloween Party	Shizuka Nomura/Kamen Rider Kiva-la		

== Publications ==
=== Photobooks ===
- 2006: Tenshinranman ISBN 4775601091
- 2006: Ichinen shi-kumi jū kyū-ban ISBN 477620357X
- 2007: Rina biyori ISBN 978-4812432952
- 2008: Rina no tabi ISBN 978-4847041174 (Making with DVD)
- 2009: Rina-iro 4 〜 seasons 〜 ISBN 978-4054037755
- 2009: sabrina ISBN 978-4091030740
- 2009: Sono manma. ISBN 978-4847042003 (Making with DVD)
- 2009: Koike Rina no subete misemasu! ISBN 978-4575301861
- 2010: BOMB tokubetsu henshū DVD-tsuki mukku `Koike Rina to Kobayashi shōjo complete file' ISBN 978-4056059137
- 2010: 17-Sai ISBN 978-4063528190
- 2012: Sotsugyō ISBN 978-4091032256
- 2012: Mubobi. ISBN 978-4847044809

=== DVDs ===
- 2004: Onii-chan to Issho
- 2006: Rina. Tanjō shite kara 12-nen
- 2006: Rina sagashi tsuā go shōtai
- 2007: Rina wa honjitsu ten'nen nari
- 2008: Ri nattsu ☆
- 2008: Kamen Rider Kiva: King of the Castle in the Demon World (Nomura Shizuka role)
- 2008: Kētai shōjo ~ koi no kagai jugyō ~ Vol. 1 ~ Vol. 6 (Fujimiya Momoka role)
- 2009: Rina-shiki 4 ~ seasons ~
- 2009: Fushigi shōjo katō urara (Kato Urara role)
- 2009: Bikkuri na!
- 2010: Koike Rina@san Daime Akechi Kogorou-Kobayashi Shoujo No Jikenbo- (Kobayashi girl role)
- 2011: Koike Rina RINAism ♪ ~ Rina-teki shinka-ron ~
- 2012: JD RINA 3
- 2012: Ri na~tsu moto.
