= Eimi Naruse =

Japanese singer-songwriter and voice actress

- 成瀬 瑛美
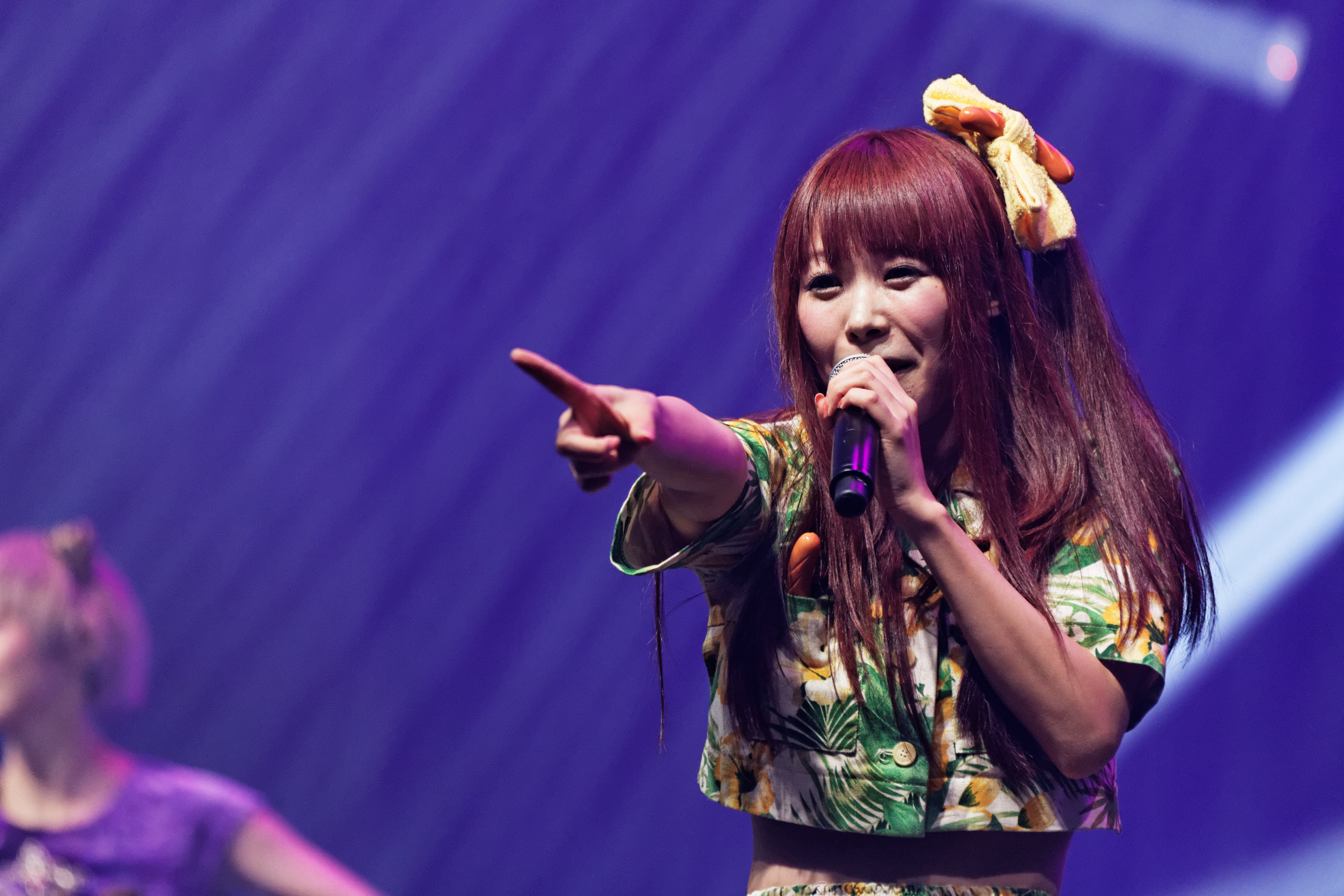
- Naruse at Japan Expo 2013
- Other names: Eitaso; Eiso
- Occupations: Singer; voice actress
- Years active: 2010–present
- Notable work: Star Twinkle PreCure as Hikaru Hoshina/Cure Star

Eimi Naruse (成瀬 瑛美, Naruse Eimi) is a Japanese singer and voice actress who is a former member of Dempagumi.inc.

Born in Kōriyama, she switched from having interests in manga to music as a teenager, and moved to Akihabara where she worked at a maid café before joining Dempagumi.inc. In addition to her work with the idol group, she has done some solo activities, including appearing in the TV drama OL desu ga, Kyabajō Hajimemashita and voicing the lead character of Star Twinkle PreCure, Hikaru Hoshina/Cure Star.

== Biography ==
=== Early life ===
Eimi Naruse was born in Kōriyama, a city in Fukushima Prefecture, as the elder of the two daughters in a family. The first memory of her life, as Naruse later described, was "cutting out paper with yellow scissors, making stars, and lining them up", and notes that yellow being her idol color was a coincidence. Due to the influence of her mother, who drew them as a hobby, she has been interested in manga from an early age. From kindergarten, she checked four magazines – Ribon, Nakayoshi, Ciao, and Weekly Shōnen Jump – and from then, she saw mangaka as a dream job. She recalls that she thought herself as "cutting edge and super cool" because there were no people in her childhood who loved anime and manga.

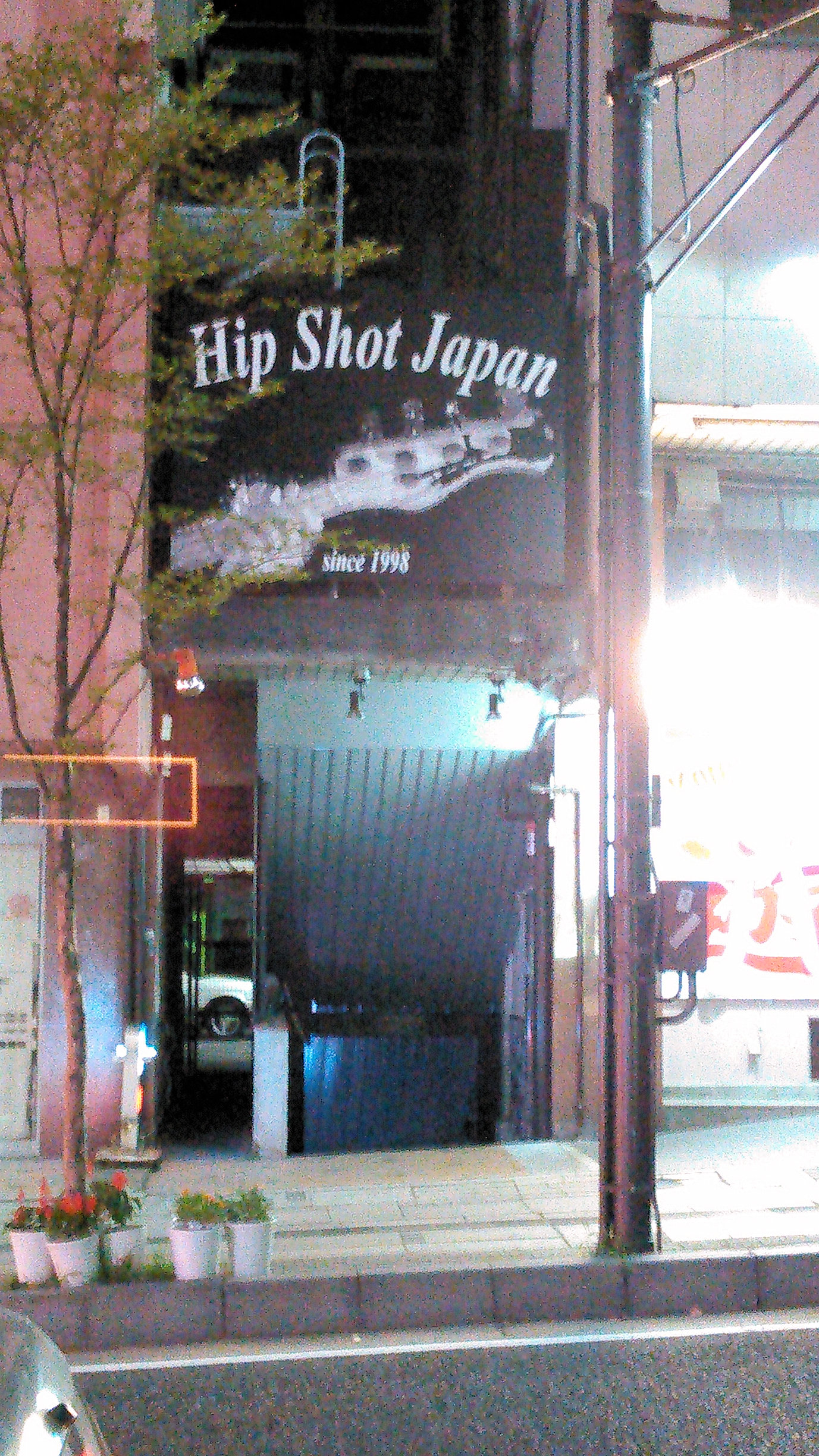
HIPSHOT JAPAN, a live house Naruse frequented as a high school student.

After going into elementary school, she started admiring the Japanese band Speed, and while singing, she would imitate Hiroko Shimabukuro. On the other hand, she recalls "I thought manga was cool, but I never thought idols were cool". She has loved reading "Tokyo Daigaku Monogatari" since his elementary school days, and she noticed that she can live with such a strange way of thinking despite its radical sexual depictions. She said that she had personally watched some of the anime that aired in Koriyama and had obtained a "mysterious superiority" that she knew about anime she did not know.

She became interested in bands from the sixth grade, borrowed a yellow Fernandes ZO-3 from a cousin, purchased a band score, and made a cover band. She said she was interested in bands she called "Rockin'On-kei", while her passion for manga was getting stronger at the same time. While examining selling works and focusing on dōjin activities, she came in contact with the internet, where she started a critique site for comic magazines. Underlying this behavior was the desire to enter the anime and manga industry, and she was researching and analyzing comic magazine sales and publisher trends to think about how to succeed as a manga artist in the future.

After going on to high school, she became interested in visual kei bands. Naruse later said of the bands, that it was more interesting to observe the connection with the girls chasing them than having interest in them herself. While in high school, Naruse worked part-time at a Chinese restaurant, and with the salary she got there, she went to HIPSHOT JAPAN, a live house located in her native Koriyama. Naruse said that although she could not afford to buy any CDs, she would go to the local Tower Records store after school and listen to all the CDs in the listening section. Naruse also said that she would often visit the Big-i observatory and think as she watched the scenery, "I love the locals [people of Koriyama] but I wanna get outta here someday". Her part-time job experience at a Chinese restaurant is said to have become the cornerstone for her subsequent maid-café employment.

=== Maid café ===
After graduating from high school, Naruse entered an art university in Tokyo hoping to get a job in manga and anime. However, she noticed that she was lacking in artistic talent and became a hikikomori, even spending half of a year only playing online games. As her savings began to run out, she consulted an in-game chatroom that she needed to get a job, and she was encouraged to work part-time at a maid café, felt inspired, and immediately started working at a maid café in Akihabara. She said that during her Koriyama part-time job she found it very fun to communicate with customers, and that, from the experience of being impressed by seeing people who return happily after talking to me, she was confident that she would definitely succeed in a maid café.

The maid café being suitable for her gender, Naruse said that she felt it to be her vocation, and even thought to bury bones in Akihabara. Although Naruse had never sang in public before, she asked the store manager to set up a stage and performed live. She was not interested in being an idol at that time, but Naruse enjoyed singing in front of people and having fun.

Nemu Yumemi, who later became her teammate in Dempagumi.inc, had received customer service from Naruse when she went to a maid café before her debut. Yumemi had been worried about art at the time, but when she received courteous service from Naruse, she felt that "the future will be brighter if you incorporate something that makes you happy directly in art", and she started working as a maid together with Naruse. When she was part-time at a maid café, she always served customers while observing and analyzing "what [she] want[s] to see and what [she's] here to see" to make every visitor happy. When Yumemi came to the store, Naruse couldn't analyze what she was coming for and saw that her aura felt different from other customers.

Later, she learned from customers about "a shop where unique and strange kids gather" and "a store with great power", and learned about the existence of Akihabara DearStage, she felt inspiration again and thought "I can sing every day here" and "if I go here, something will happen in the future", and in July 2008 she quit her job at the maid café. After her first application was rejected, she worked part-time at a Mandarake shop before being accepted the third time in the summer of 2009.

=== Debut ===
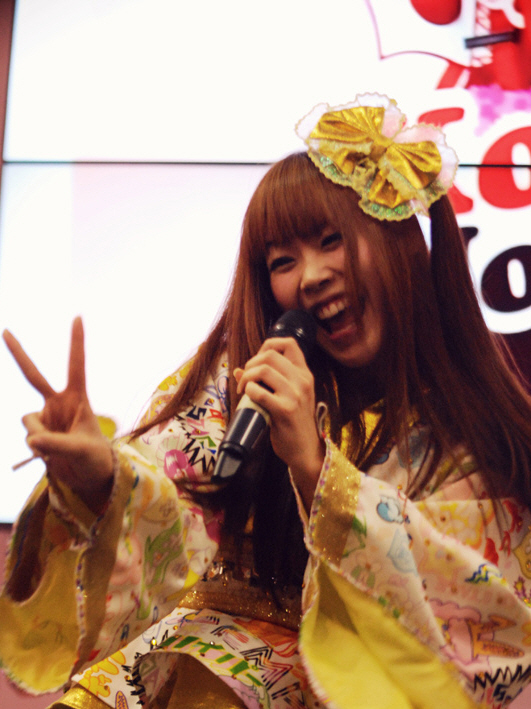
Naruse at Indonesia Fashion Week 2013

At that time, Naruse had a dream of becoming an anime singer, and that was the main reason why she entered DearStage. Naruse later mentioned that she did not have the feeling of wanting to be an idol at all, but rather the feeling that the idol was cool. Dempagumi.inc had already formed at the time she had entered, and Naruse witnessed the first stage held in SHIBUYA BOXX, but "felt honestly far from [her]self". Meanwhile, she formed the idol unit Mizutama Online (水玉おんらいん, Mizutama Onrain) with Mirin Furukawa.

About one year after she entered, Naruse was invited to Dempagumi.inc by producer Maiko Fukushima, and became a member on 3 June 2010 alongside Myu Atobe. At that time, the reason Naruse decided to join was that "Aki Hata and Masaya Koike are a group who write their own songs", and she was at first active with a strong solo orientation. Fukushima later said that from the moment Naruse entered DearStage, she felt her desire to be in Dempagumi.inc, and that "her character, voice, and that feeling are exactly like Dempagumi."

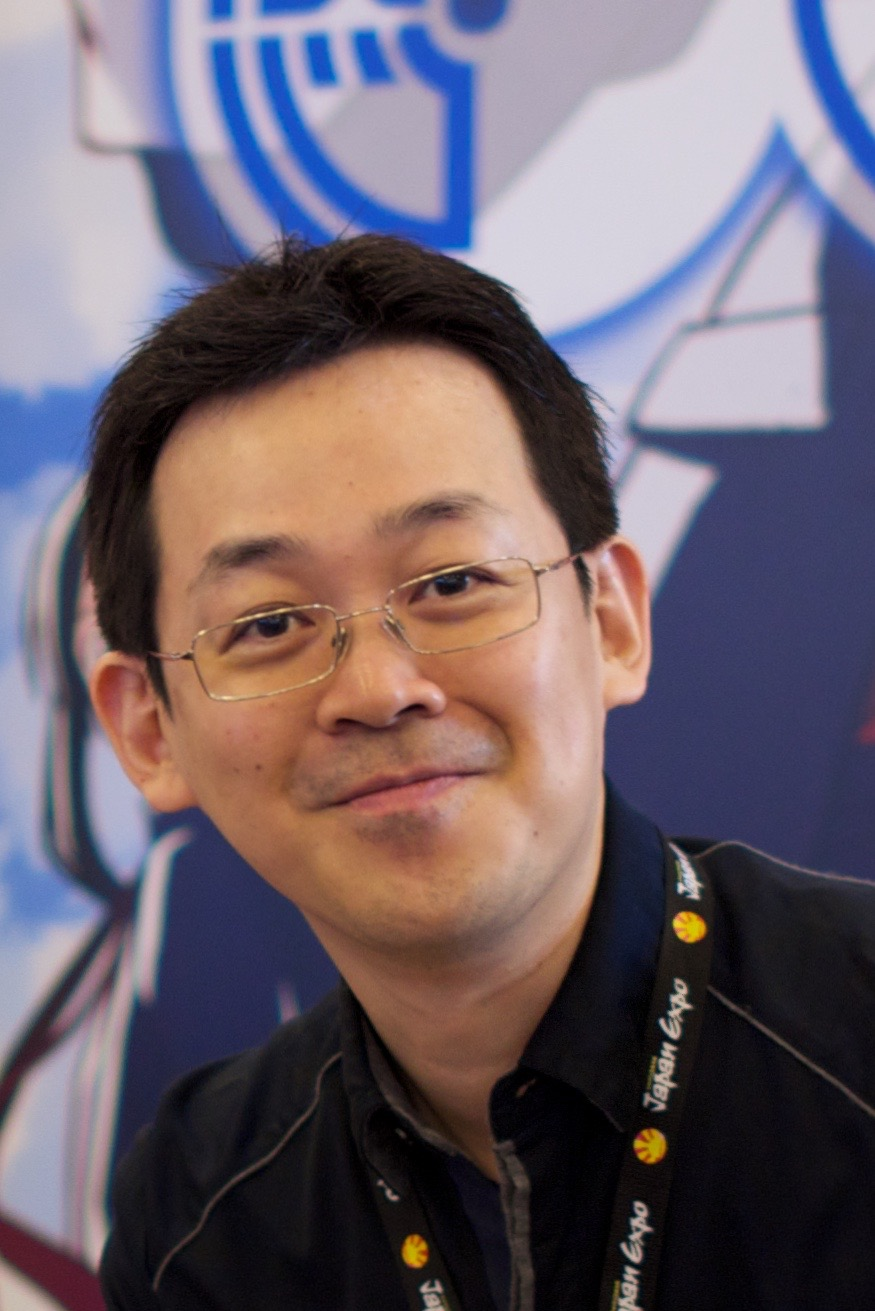
Naruse's surname was inspired by Naru Narusegawa, a character in Love Hina (creator Ken Akamatsu pictured in 2015)

Naruse intended to quit many times one or two years after joining, but there was an increase in fashion-related jobs and, after the Saizen Zero Zero live, she began to feel a sudden response from the "real feeling that people outside Akihabara will be interested in Dempagumi.inc", and she came to work mainly on Dempagumi.inc. Also, Naruse felt that, before joining, the band had a gentle image and felt that it was "not suitable for me", but after joining, songs "feeling bright and messed up" like "Wahhoi? Omatsuri/inc" were being produced, and she would later say that she felt that he had joined Dempagumi with a good feeling because it was in line with his image, but that he may have been happy.

Her stage surname Naruse was derived from Naru Narusegawa, a character in the manga Love Hina, and her desire to be like her. Her stage forename is also her real forename. Her Eimi Naruse idol character is a marge of her own self and the ideal heroines in manga, and is considerably influenced by the main character of Goldfish Warning!. Her Dempagumi.inc catchphrase is High Tension A-Pop Girl, and her Dempagumi.inc color is yellow.

On 6 November 2020, it was announced that Naruse will graduate from Dempagumi.inc in a two final live performances on 15 and 16 February 2021.

=== Solo activities ===
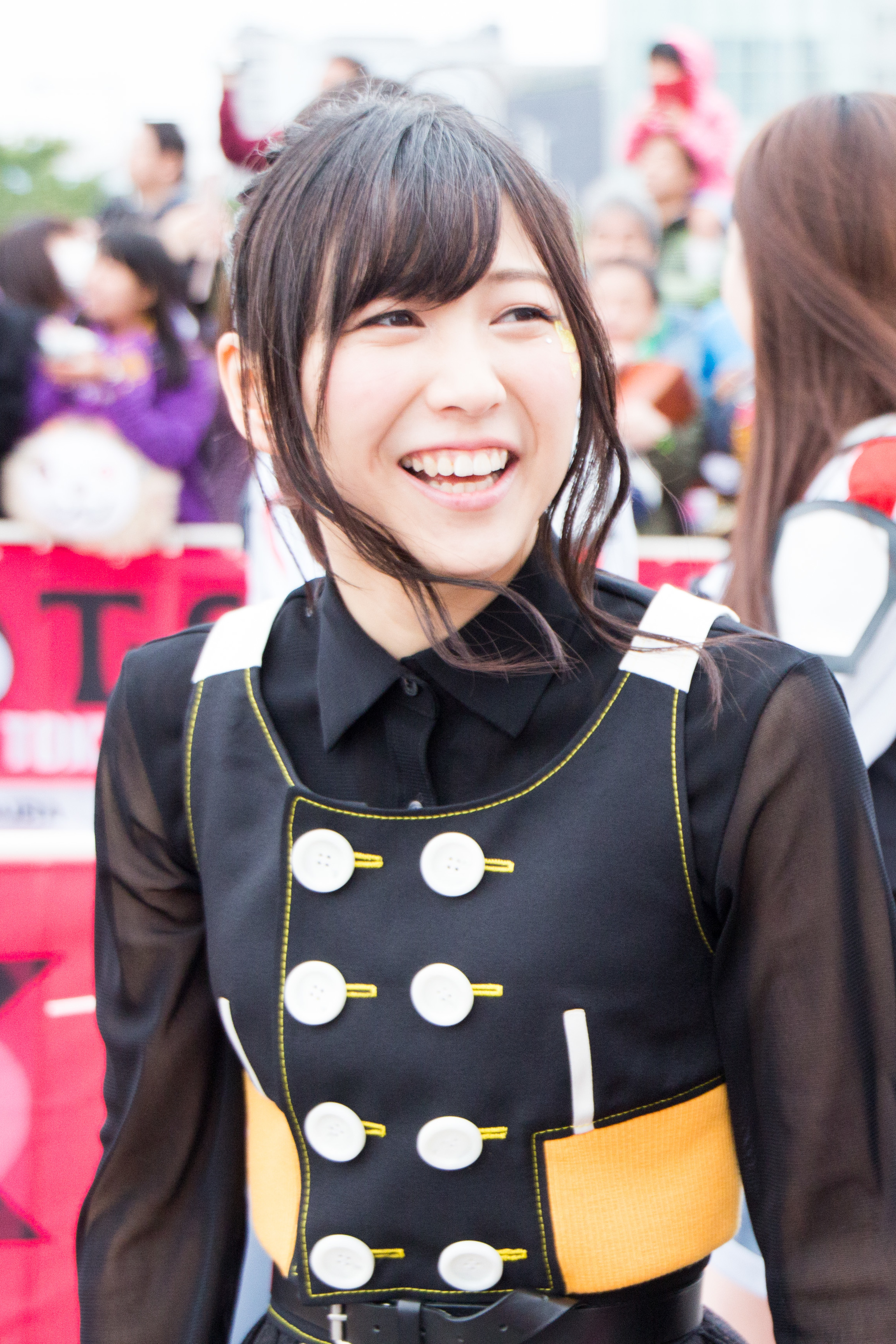
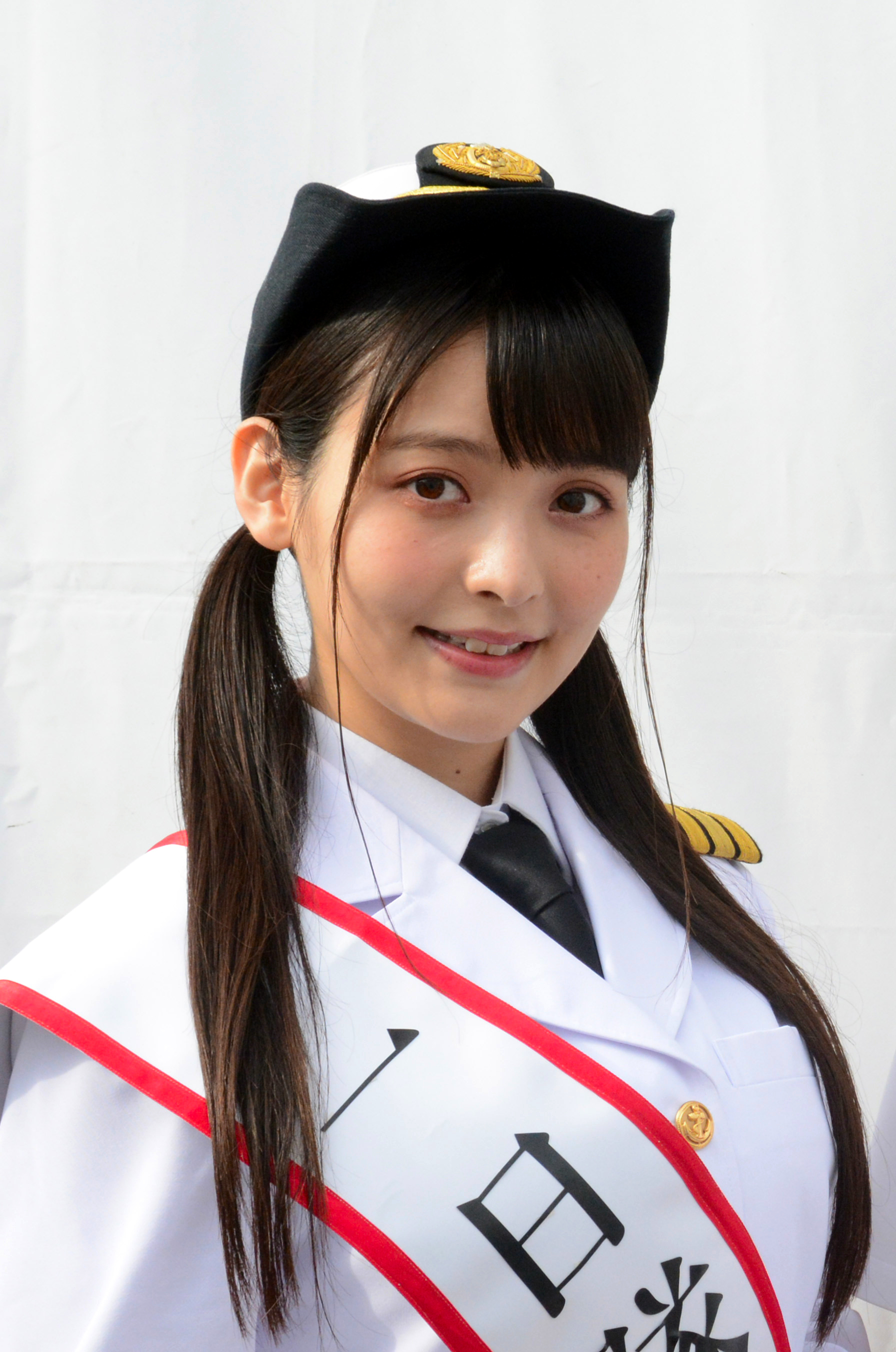
Naruse starred in Star Twinkle PreCure alongside Kiyono Yasuno (left, in 2016) and Sumire Uesaka (right, in 2019, the same year the show aired)

From January to March 2015, Naruse starred in Doamaiger D alongside Ryouta Murai and Kouichi Oohori, voicing Anna Hodō; In May 2016, Fuji TV on Demand began airing Dempagumi.inc Naruse Eimi ga Ageage de Manga o Shōkai suru Bangumi; this was described as Naruse's first kanmuribangumi. From June to July 2016, she appeared in all four episode of the TV drama OL desu ga, Kyabajō Hajimemashita. In November 2017, she starred in a major role in the musical comedy Happy Market! She appeared in a stage adaptation of Nobunaga's Ambition: Taishi in May 2018. She was also the singing voice of Ringo Hoshimiya, a character in Aikatsu!.

Following an early-bird appearance in the season finale of the previous Pretty Cure season, Hugtto! PreCure, she starred in Star Twinkle PreCure, the sixteenth season of the Pretty Cure franchise, alongside Konomi Kohara, Kiyono Yasuno, and Mikako Komatsu; she voices the main lead Hikaru Hoshina/Cure Star. The four were later joined by Sumire Uesaka in the season's twenty-first episode.

== Filmography ==
This section only includes her solo work, and does not include her work with Dempagumi.inc.
2016

- OL desu ga, Kyabajō Hajimemashita, Alice

2017

- Happy Market!

2018

- Nobunaga's Ambition: Taishi stage adaptation

=== Internet ===
- Dempagumi.inc Naruse Eimi ga Ageage de Manga o Shōkai suru Bangumi

=== Television ===
- Dempagumi.inc Naruse Eimi ga Ageage de Manga o Shōkai suru Bangumi terrestrial broadcast version
- Irakon

=== Anime ===
2013

- Aikatsu!, Ringo Hoshimiya's singing voice
- Nyuru Nyuru!! Kakusen Kun, Eitaso

2015

- Doamaiger D, Anna Hodō

2018

- Manuneko, Magical Majiko
- Abare! Meisaku-kun!, Eitaso

2019

- Hugtto! PreCure, Hikaru Hoshina/Cure Star
- Star Twinkle PreCure, Hikaru Hoshina/Cure Star

2020

- That is the Bottleneck, Umina

2021

- Yami Shibai season 9, "Anonymous" (various characters)

=== Film ===
- Gekijō-ban gdgd Yōseis tte Iu Eiga wa Dō kana…?, Eitaso (2014)
- Pretty Cure Miracle Universe, Hikaru Hoshina/Cure Star (2019)
- Star Twinkle PreCure: These Feelings Within The Song Of Stars, Hikaru Hoshina/Cure Star (2019)
- Pretty Cure Miracle Leap: A Wonderful Day with Everyone, Hikaru Hoshina/Cure Star (2020)
- Pretty Cure All Stars F, Hikaru Hoshina/Cure Star (2023)
