= Pretty Cure All Stars F =

2023 film by Yuta Tanaka

- Theatrical release poster
- Japanese: 映画プリキュアオールスターズF
- Revised Hepburn: Eiga Purikuya Ōru Sutāzu Efu
- Directed by: Yuta Tanaka
- Screenplay by: Jin Tanaka
- Based on: Pretty Cure by Izumi Todo
- Starring: Akira Sekine; Ai Kakuma; Ayumu Murase; Ayaka Nanase; Aoi Koga; Yū Shimamura; Saori Hayami; Saki Fujita; Rina Honnizumi; Konomi Kohara; Aoi Yūki; Suzuko Mimori; Fairouz Ai; Rina Hidaka; Hana Hishikawa; Ai Kayano; Maaya Sakamoto; Atsumi Tanezaki
- Cinematography: Kenji Takahashi; Yuki Ōshima
- Music by: Erika Fukusawa
- Production company: Toei Animation
- Distributed by: Toei Company, Ltd.
- Release date: September 15, 2023
- Running time: 73 minutes
- Country: Japan
- Language: Japanese

Pretty Cure All Stars F (Japanese: 映画プリキュアオールスターズF, Hepburn: Eiga Purikyua Ōru Sutāzu Efu) is a 2023 Japanese animated action fantasy film based on the Pretty Cure franchise created by Izumi Todo. The film was directed by Yuta Tanaka, written by Jin Tanaka and produced by Toei Animation. The film was released in Japan on September 15, 2023.

Celebrating the 20th anniversary of the franchise and the fourteenth entry to the Pretty Cure All Stars crossover film series, the Soaring Sky! Pretty Cure team joining the previous Pretty Cure teams, as they try to reunite with each other after an unknown catastrophic event.

== Plot ==
Sora wakes up in a strange world, with Cure Summer and Cure Precious trying to save her from a monster. She then transforms into Cure Sky to assist them and defeats the monster. After it retreats, she befriends them and decides to head towards the mysterious castle. (Note: Dubbed off-screen as Sky Team) Meanwhile, Tsubasa and Ageha have also befriended other respective Cures and try to head towards the same castle, (Note: Respectively dubbed off-screen as Wing Team (consist of Cures Wing, Ange, Felice and Flora) and Butterfly Team (consist of Cures Butterfly, Earth, Milky, and Macaron)) while Mashiro and her team (Note: Dubbed off-screen as Prism Team (consist of Cures Prism, Finale, La Mer and Grace)) rescue a mysterious rabbit-like creature named Puka. Sora and her team encounter and befriend a mysterious Pretty Cure named Cure Supreme. A few days later, Sora's team and Mashiro's team are briefly reunited at a town, but not before Puka accidentally causes a pit after seeing Supreme's presence. However, Ageha's team reunites with Sora's, and they head towards the castle, while Mashiro's team also reaches the castle from underground.

At the castle, everyone is reunited and defeat Lord Ark but are confused as to why this was too easy for them. Supreme then attacks Cure Macaron and reveals everything: Supreme is an extraterrestrial entity that defeated the Pretty Cures and destroyed Earth; inspired by the united power of the Cures, she decided to imitate as a human, and created Ark and Puka. But after failing to meet her expectation, she decides to destroy the world again, and succeeds in defeating most Cures, except Sky and Prism, who barely manage to escape with Puka and Elle. The duo decides to confront Supreme again and realize that she is the catalyst of recreating Earth and helps Sky, Prism and Majesty to bring back the other Cures to put the world into its rightful place. Miracle Lights appear, and with the power of harmonized love and friendship, all 78 Cures are revived. The Cures then combine their powers, with Puka transformed into Cure Puka, and defeat and purify Supreme.

Supreme is revived as a human, and surprised that the Cures decided to be her friend at the end. Cure Puka helps Supreme understand that she always wanted a companion, as well as the meaning of determination, love, trust and friendship.

== Voice cast ==
Sky Team

- Akira Sekine as Sora Harewataru/Cure Sky, originally appearing in Soaring Sky! Pretty Cure. She is a hardworking 14-year-old girl from Skyland, who can, with the Sky Tone's power, transform into Cure Sky, the Pretty Cure of the blue sky whose theme color is blue.
- Hana Hishikawa as Yui Nagomi/Cure Precious, originally appearing in Delicious Party Pretty Cure. She is a 13-year-old girl who is relaxed, straightforward, and energetic, and can, with the power of her fairy partner Kome-Kome, transform into her alter-ego, Cure Precious, whose theme color is pink.
- Fairouz Ai as Manatsu Natsuumi/Cure Summer, originally appearing in Tropical-Rouge! Pretty Cure. She is an extremely energetic 13-year-old girl who always acts before she thinks, and as Cure Summer, her charm point is her lips and her theme color is rainbow.
- Maaya Sakamoto as Preme/Cure Supreme, the film's villain and an original character to the franchise.

Prism Team

- Ai Kakuma as Mashiro Nijigaoka/Cure Prism, originally appearing in Soaring Sky! Pretty Cure. She is a 14-year-old girl from Sorashido City, who has some knowledge about cooking and nature. Her nickname is "Mashiron" (ましろん). With the Sky Tone's power, she can transform into Cure Prism, the Pretty Cure of light whose theme color is white.
- Ai Kayano as Amane Kasai/Cure Finale, originally appearing in Delicious Party Pretty Cure. She is a 15-year-old girl who has a strong sense of justice and is known for being reliable. She has the power to transform into Cure Finale, whose theme color is gold.
- Rina Hidaka as Laura/Cure La Mer, originally appearing in Tropical-Rouge! Pretty Cure. She is a mermaid from Grand Ocean, who is self-confident, selfish, and honest. She has the power to take back stolen Motivation Power using the Mermaid Aqua Pot, and as Cure La Mer, her charm point is her nails and her theme color is blue.
- Aoi Yūki as Nodoka Hanadera/Cure Grace, originally appearing in Healin' Good Pretty Cure. She is a second-year middle school student, who is kind, calm, and goes at her own pace, and strives to try many different things, but lacks the athletic ability to do so. As Cure Grace, she is the Pretty Cure of flowers and her theme color is pink.
- Atsumi Tanezaki as Puka/Cure Puka, a fairy and an original character to the franchise.

Wing Team

- Ayumu Murase as Tsubasa Yuunagi/Cure Wing, originally appearing in Soaring Sky! Pretty Cure. He is a Puni Bird from Skyland who can take the form of a 12-year-old human boy. With the Sky Tone's power, he can transform into Cure Wing, the Pretty Cure of wings whose theme color is orange.
- Aoi Koga as Ellee/Cure Majesty, originally appearing in Soaring Sky! Pretty Cure. She is the 1-year old adopted princess of Skyland and is known as the "Child of Destiny". She can create Sky Tones for the Pretty Cures through her power. After Skearhead abducts her, she awakens her powers and becomes a Pretty Cure, allowing her to escape and save the Cures from him. With the Sky Tone's power, she can transform into Cure Majesty, the mystical Pretty Cure, whose theme color is purple.
- Rina Honnizumi as Saaya Yakushiji/Cure Ange, originally appearing in Hug! Pretty Cure. She is a 14-year-old girl known for being responsible and smart. As Cure Ange, she has an angel and nurse motif and is known as the Pretty Cure of Wisdom, whose theme color is blue.
- Saori Hayami as Kotoha Hanami/Cure Felice, originally appearing in Witchy Pretty Cure!. She is a mysterious fairy who appeared from the Linkle Smartbook and over time grows up and gains the power to transform into Cure Felice. As Cure Felice, she is the Pretty Cure of Life and her theme color is green.
- Yū Shimamura as Haruka Haruno/Cure Flora, originally appearing in Go! Princess PreCure. She is a kind, energetic, and cheerful 13-year-old girl who dreams of becoming a princess. Her Dress Up Keys are Flora, Rose, Lily, Sakura (Cherry Blossom), Pumpkin and Royal and her theme color is pink.

Butterfly Team

- Ayaka Nanase as Ageha Hijiri/Cure Butterfly, originally appearing in Soaring Sky! Pretty Cure. She is an 18-year-old girl who is Mashiro's childhood friend and aspires to be a teacher. She is kindhearted, energetic, and sisterly and has a soft spot for younger children. With the Sky Tone's power, she can transform into Cure Butterfly, the Pretty Cure of butterflies whose theme color is pink.
- Suzuko Mimori as Asumi Fuurin/Cure Earth, originally appearing in Healin' Good Pretty Cure. She is a girl born from the spirit of the Healing Garden and Queen Teatine's wish for someone to protect Latte, and physically appears to be 20 years old. She is calm and friendly, although sometimes naive. As Cure Earth, she is the Pretty Cure of wind and her theme color is purple.
- Konomi Kohara as Lala Hagoromo/Cure Milky, originally appearing in Star Twinkle PreCure. She is an alien from the planet Samaan who, along with Prunce and Fuwa, comes to Earth to find the Pretty Cure and becomes one herself. While serious and responsible, she sometimes makes mistakes while adjusting to Earth's people and customs. As Cure Milky, her main technique is "Milky Shock", which can be upgraded into stronger variations by using a Princess Star Color Pen, and her theme color is green.
- Saki Fujita as Yukari Kotozume/Cure Macaron, originally appearing in Kirakira Pretty Cure a la Mode. She is a 17-year-old girl known for her beauty and nobility, but can be selfish and arrogant like a cat. As Cure Macaron, she is the Pretty Cure of beauty and excitement and has a cat and macaron motif. Her Animal Sweet is the Cat Macaron and her theme color is purple.

Other Pretty Cure characters

- Yōko Honna as Nagisa Misumi/Cure Black
- Yukana as Honoka Yukishiro/Cure White
- Orie Kimoto as Saki Hyuuga/Cure Bloom/Cure Bright
- Yūko Sanpei as Nozomi Yumehara/Cure Dream
- Kanae Oki as Love Momozono/Cure Peach
- Nana Mizuki as Tsubomi Hanasaki/Cure Blossom
- Ami Koshimizu as Hibiki Hojo/Cure Melody
- Misato Fukuen as Miyuki Hoshizora/Cure Happy
- Hitomi Nabatame as Mana Aida/Cure Heart
- Megumi Nakajima as Megumi Aino/Cure Lovely
- Masumi Asano as Minami Kaido/Cure Mermaid
- Rie Takahashi as Mirai Asahina/Cure Miracle
- Karen Miyama as Ichika Usami/Cure Whip
- Nanako Mori as Akira Tenjō/Cure Chocolat
- Rie Hikisaka as Hana Nono/Cure Yell
- Eimi Naruse as Hikaru Hoshina/Cure Star
- Ai Kakuma as Rabirin
- Haruka Shiraishi as Rate
- Natsumi Takamori as Kome-Kome

== Production ==
In March 2023, it was announced that a new Pretty Cure All Stars film was in the works, featuring the Cures from Soaring Sky! Pretty Cure. In July 2023, it was announced that Yuta Tanaka and Jin Tanaka, whom previously worked on Go! Princess PreCure series, Witchy Pretty Cure! The Movie: Wonderous! Cure Mofurun! and Star Twinkle Pretty Cure the Movie: These Feeling within The Song of Stars films, will respectively serve as the director and screenwriter of the film, and would feature new characters named Cure Supreme voiced by Maaya Sakamoto, and its partner Puka, voiced by Atsumi Tanezaki. Machico and Ami Ishii will perform the opening theme song, "For F", while Ikimonogakari will perform the film's ending theme song, titled "Ureshikute" (うれしくて; lit. "Because I'm so Happy").

In an interview with the film's director and chief animation director / character designer, Yuta Tanaka and Nishiki Itaoka respectfully, on October 6, 2023, noted how both teamed up on the film, original concepts for the film, challenges of having so many characters and different designs, methods for deciding which characters were on which teams, creation of the villain "Cure Supreme", message kids should take from the film, and possibility of this film being the final one for the franchise.

== Release ==
The film was released in theaters in Japan on September 15, 2023. On November 2, Toei Animation Europe exclusively screened the film at Cinema Centrale for fans at Lucca Comics & Games Convention, in Italy, along with three guests from Japan.

In December, Neofilms began showing the film in Hong Kong. On December 10, the film received a fan screening in Thailand, with regular screenings starting on December 14.

== Reception ==
=== Box office ===
The film earned 437 million yen in the Japanese box office in its three day weekend, making the highest opening weekend box office in the Pretty Cure franchise. It also dropped from number 2 to number 3 in the top 10 box office rank in its second weekend. By October 22, it had become the highest-selling film in the Pretty Cure franchise, beating Pretty Cure All Stars DX2: Light of Hope - Protect the Rainbow Jewel! (2010) and Hug! Pretty Cure Futari wa Pretty Cure: All Stars Memories (2018).

=== Critical reception ===
The film was received positively by critics. Timothy Donhoo of CBR called the film "something of a swan song for the likely soon-to-end anime", Soaring Sky! Pretty Cure. Aman Goyal, also on CBR, argued that Prim undergoes a "transformative journey" while she tried to connect with other PreCures which are part of the Cure Sky team.
