= Pretty Cure All Stars =

Series of Japanese anime films

- Logo of the first Pretty Cure: All Stars film, DX: Everyone's Friends☆The Collection of Miracles!

プリキュアオールスターズ (PuriKyua Ōru Sutāzu)
- Genre: Magical girl
- Created by: Izumi Todo
- Anime films
- Pretty Cure All Stars DX: Everyone's Friends - the Collection of Miracles! (2009); Pretty Cure All Stars DX2: Light of Hope - Protect the Rainbow Jewel! (2010); Pretty Cure All Stars DX3: Deliver the Future! The Rainbow-Colored Flower That Connects the World (2011); Pretty Cure All Stars New Stage: Friends of the Future (2012); Pretty Cure All Stars New Stage 2: Friends of the Heart (2013); Pretty Cure All Stars New Stage 3: Eternal Friends (2014); Pretty Cure All Stars: Spring Carnival♪ (2015); Pretty Cure All Stars: Singing with Everyone♪ Miraculous Magic! (2016); Pretty Cure Dream Stars! (2017); Pretty Cure Super Stars! (2018); Hug! Pretty Cure Futari wa Pretty Cure: All Stars Memories (2018); Pretty Cure Miracle Universe (2019); Pretty Cure Miracle Leap: A Strange Day with Everyone (2020); Pretty Cure All Stars F (2023)

Pretty Cure All Stars (プリキュアオールスターズ, PuriKyua Ōru Sutāzu) is a series of Japanese anime films produced by Toei Animation based on Izumi Todo's Pretty Cure anime television franchise. Each movie features a storyline which crosses over characters from all Pretty Cure anime series to date. From Dream Stars onwards, the films instead feature Cures from the current series and the previous two series. However, All Stars F returns to the initial format by featuring all 78 Cures. As of September 2023, there are currently 14 main films in the series, All Stars movies are generally released shortly after the premiere of a new Pretty Cure television series. The most recent Pretty Cure team at the time of release generally has the largest involvement with the movie's plot. In the opening scenes of each movie, a running gag occurs, in which the most recent Pretty Cure team bump into older teams by accident. As well, the fairies of Pretty Cure teams know each other as friends. With the exception of Pretty Cure All Stars: Singing with Everyone Miraculous Magic!, each movie to date utilizes Miracle Lights, which are small flashlights handed out to audience members during screenings, with the finale encouraging viewers to wave their lights to support the Cures in defeating the main antagonist. The films often have a short segment instructing children on how to use their Lights safely. These Lights have also been made available for certain movies based on the individual series.

== Films ==
=== Pretty Cure All Stars DX: Everyone's Friends - the Collection of Miracles (2009) ===
Pretty Cure All Stars DX: Everyone's Friends - the Collection of Miracles (プリキュアオールスターズDX みんなともだちっ☆奇跡の全員大集合!, Eiga PuriKyua Ōru Sutāzu Dirakkusu: Minna Tomodachi☆Kiseki no Zenin Daishūgō) is the first movie in the series and the first in the DX trilogy. It was released on March 20, 2009, and features the Cures from Futari wa Pretty Cure Max Heart, Futari wa Pretty Cure Splash Star, Yes! Pretty Cure 5 GoGo! and Fresh Pretty Cure!.

=== Pretty Cure All Stars DX2: Light of Hope - Protect the Rainbow Jewel! (2010) ===
Pretty Cure All Stars DX2: Light of Hope - Protect The Rainbow Jewel! (プリキュアオールスターズDX2 希望の光☆レインボージュエルを守れ！, Eiga PuriKyua Ōru Sutāzu Dirakkusu Tsū: Kibō no Hikari☆Reinbō Jueru o Mamore!) is the second film in the series and the second in the DX trilogy. It was released on March 20, 2010, and stars all Cures from previous series, with the addition of those introduced in HeartCatch PreCure!

=== Pretty Cure All Stars DX3: Deliver the Future! The Rainbow-Colored Flower That Connects the World (2011) ===
Pretty Cure All Stars DX3: Deliver the Future! The Rainbow-Colored Flower That Connects the World (プリキュアオールスターズDX3 未来にとどけ！世界をつなぐ☆虹色の花, Eiga Purikyua Ōru Sutāzu Dirakkusu Surī: Mirai ni Todoke! Sekai o Tsunagu Niji-Iro no Hana) is the third movie in the series and the last in the DX trilogy. It was released on March 19, 2011, starring all Cures from the previous series, including those introduced in Suite PreCure, as well as various villains from previous Pretty Cure movies. The theatrical release was edited in parts as a result of the 2011 Sendai earthquake and tsunami which occurred before the movie's release. The movie was later released on DVD and Blu-ray Disc on July 20, 2011, with the deleted scenes restored.

=== Pretty Cure All Stars New Stage: Friends of the Future (2012) ===
Pretty Cure All Stars New Stage: Friends of the Future (プリキュアオールスターズ New Stage みらいのともだち, Eiga PuriKyua Ōru Sutāzu Nyū Sutēji: Mirai no Tomodachi) is the fourth film in the series and the first of the New Stage trilogy. It was released in Japanese theatres on March 17, 2012, and stars all Cures from previous series, including those introduced in Smile PreCure!. It also introduces a movie-exclusive Pretty Cure named Cure Echo. The film was released on DVD and BD on July 18, 2012, and was aired as part of TV Asahi's Super Hero and Heroine Summer Vacation special on August 25, 2013.

=== Pretty Cure All Stars New Stage 2: Friends of the Heart (2013) ===
Pretty Cure All Stars New Stage 2: Friends of the Heart (プリキュアオールスターズ New Stage 2 こころのともだち, Eiga PuriKyua Ōru Sutāzu Nyū Sutēji Tsū: Kokoro no Tomodachi) is the fifth movie in the series and the second in the New Stage trilogy. It was released in theaters on March 16, 2013, and on Blu-ray Disc and DVD on July 26, 2013. It features all Cures, including those introduced in DokiDoki! PreCure.

=== Pretty Cure All Stars New Stage 3: Eternal Friends (2014) ===
Pretty Cure All Stars New Stage 3: Eternal Friends (映画 プリキュアオールスターズ New Stage 3 永遠のともだち, Eiga Purikyua Ōru Sutāzu Nyū Sutēji Surī: Eien no Tomodachi) is the sixth film in the series and the last in the New Stage trilogy. It features all Cures, including those introduced in HappinessCharge PreCure!. The film was released in Japanese theaters on March 15, 2014, and on Blu-ray Disc and DVD on July 25, 2014, and celebrates the 10th anniversary of the franchise. Ayame Goriki starred as Nami in the third film of New Stage.

=== Pretty Cure All Stars: Spring Carnival♪ (2015) ===
Pretty Cure All Stars: Spring Carnival♪ (映画 プリキュアオールスターズ 春のカーニバル♪, Eiga Purikyua Ōru Sutāzu: Haru Kānibaru♪) is the seventh film in the series, released on March 14, 2015. It is the first feature-length Pretty Cure film to feature extended dance scenes, similar to the 2011 short film Pretty Cure All Stars DX: 3D Theatre. It features characters from all Pretty Cure series, including those introduced in Go! Princess PreCure.

=== Pretty Cure All Stars: Singing with Everyone♪ Miraculous Magic! (2016) ===
Pretty Cure All Stars: Singing with Everyone♪ Miraculous Magic! (映画 プリキュアオールスターズ: みんなで歌う♪奇跡の魔法!, Eiga Purikyua Ōru Sutāzu: Minna de Utau♪ Kiseki no Mahō!) is the eighth film in the series and the 20th film overall in the Pretty Cure franchise. Unlike previous films, it is a musical, and features Cures from Witchy PreCure!. It was released in Japan on March 19, 2016.

=== Pretty Cure Dream Stars! (2017) ===
Pretty Cure Dream Stars! (映画プリキュアドリームスターズ！, Eiga Purikyua Dorīmu Sutāzu!) is the ninth film in the series, which focuses on characters from Go! Princess PreCure, Witchy PreCure!, and Kirakira Pretty Cure a la Mode. The film was released in Japan on March 18, 2017.

=== Pretty Cure Super Stars! (2018) ===
Pretty Cure Super Stars! (映画 プリキュアスーパースターズ！, Eiga Purikyua Sūpā Sutāzu!) is the tenth film in the series. which focuses on characters from Witchy PreCure!, Kirakira Pretty Cure a la Mode, and Hug! Pretty Cure, and was released in Japan on March 17, 2018.

=== Hug! Pretty Cure Futari wa Pretty Cure: All Stars Memories (2018) ===
Hug! Pretty Cure Futari wa Pretty Cure: All Stars Memories (映画 HUGっと!プリキュア♡ふたりはプリキュア オールスターズメモリーズ, Eiga Hagutto! Purikyua ♡ Futari wa Puri Kyua Ōru Sutāzu Memorīzu) is the eleventh film in the series, which celebrates the 15th anniversary of the franchise and was released on October 27, 2018. It focuses on the Hug! Pretty Cure team as they join forces with the Futari wa Pretty Cure team to retrieve the stolen memories of other Pretty Cures from an evil teru teru bōzu named Miden.

=== Pretty Cure Miracle Universe (2019) ===
Pretty Cure Miracle Universe (映画 プリキュアミラクルユニバース, Eiga Purikyua Mirakuru Yunivāsu) is the twelfth film in the series, which focuses on characters from Kirakira Pretty Cure a la Mode, Hug! Pretty Cure, and Star Twinkle PreCure. The movie was released in theaters on March 16, 2019.

=== Pretty Cure Miracle Leap: A Strange Day With Everyone (2020) ===
Pretty Cure Miracle Leap: A Strange Day With Everyone (映画 プリキュアミラクルリープ みんなとの不思議な1日, Eiga Purikyua Mirakuru Rīpu: Min'na to no Fushigi na Ichinichi) is the thirteenth film in the series, and features the Cures from Hug! Pretty Cure, Star Twinkle PreCure, and Healin' Good Pretty Cure, The movie was released in theaters on October 31, 2020.

=== Pretty Cure All Stars F (2023) ===
Pretty Cure All Stars F (映画プリキュアオールスターズF, Eiga Purikyua Ōru Sutāzu Efu) is the fourteenth film in the series, which features all 78 main Cures, including those introduced in Soaring Sky! Pretty Cure. The movie was released in theaters on September 15, 2023.

== Pretty Cure films ==
No.	Title	Release date
1	Futari wa Pretty Cure Max Heart the Movie (映画 ふたりはプリキュア マックスハート, Eiga Futari wa Purikyua Makkusu Hāto)	April 16, 2005
2	Futari wa Pretty Cure Max Heart 2: Friends of the Snow-Laden Sky (映画 ふたりはプリキュア マックスハート2: 雪空 の 友達, Eiga Futari wa Purikyua Makkusu Hāto Two: Yukizora no Tomodachi)	December 10, 2005
3	Futari wa Pretty Cure Splash Star: Tick-Tock Crisis Hanging by a Thin Thread! (映画 ふたりはプリキュア スプラッシュ☆スター チクタク危機一髪!, Eiga Futari wa Purikyua Supurashu Sutā Tiku Taku Kiki Ippatsu!)	December 9, 2006
4	Yes! PreCure 5 the Movie: Great Miraculous Adventure in the Mirror Kingdom! (映画 Yes!プリキュア5 鏡の国のミラクル大冒険!, Eiga Iesu! Purikyua Faibu: Kagami no Kuni no Mirakuru Daibōken!)	November 10, 2007
5	Yes! PreCure 5 GoGo! the Movie: Happy Birthday in the Sweets Kingdom (映画 Yes! プリキュア5 Go Go! お菓子の国のハッピーバースディ♪, Eiga Iesu! Purikyua Faibu GōGō! Okashi no Kuni no Happī Bāsudi♪)	November 8, 2008
6	Fresh Pretty Cure! the Movie: The Kingdom of Toys has Lots of Secrets!? (映画 フレッシュプリキュア! おもちゃの国は秘密がいっぱい!?, Eiga Furesshu Purikyua! Omocha no Kuni wa Himitsu ga Ippai!?)	October 31, 2009
7	HeartCatch PreCure! the Movie: Fashion Show in the Flower Capital... Really?! (映画 ハートキャッチプリキュア！花の都でファッションショー···ですか！？, Eiga HātoKyatchi Purikyua! Hana no Miyako de Fasshon Shō...Desu ka!?)	October 30, 2010
8	Suite PreCure the Movie: Take it back! The Miraculous Melody that Connects Hearts (映画 スイートプリキュア♪ とりもどせ! 心がつなぐ奇跡のメロディ♪, Eiga Suīto Purikyua♪: Torimodose! Kokoro ga Tsunagu Kiseki no Merodi!)	October 29, 2011
9	Smile PreCure! the Movie: Big Mismatch in a Picture Book! (映画 スマイルプリキュア！ 絵本の中はみんなチグハグ！, Eiga Sumairu Purikyua!: Ehon no Naka wa Minna Chiguhagu!)	October 27, 2012
10	DokiDoki! Precure the Movie: Mana's Getting Married!!? The Dress of Hope that Connects to the Future (映画 ドキドキ！プリキュア マナ結婚！！？未来につなぐ希望のドレス, Eiga Dokidoki! Purikyua: Mana Kekkon!!? Mirai ni Tsunagu Kibō no Doresu)	October 26 2013
11	HappinessCharge PreCure! the Movie: The Ballerina of the Land of Dolls (映画 ハピネスチャージプリキュア！人形の国のバレリーナ, Eiga HapinesuChāji Purikyua! Ningyō no Kuni no Barerīna)	October 11, 2014
12	Go! Princess Pretty Cure the Movie: Go! Go!! Gorgeous Triple Feature!!! (映画 Go！プリンセスプリキュア Go！ Go！！ 豪華3本立て！！！, Eiga Gō! Purinsesu Purikyua: Gō! Gō!! Gōka San-bon Date!!!)	October 31, 2015
13	Witchy Pretty Cure! The Movie: Wonderous! Cure Mofurun! (映画 魔法つかいプリキュア！ 奇跡の変身！キュアモフルン！, Eiga Mahōtsukai Purikyua!: Kiseki no Henshin! Kyua Mofurun!)	October 29, 2016
14	Kirakira Pretty Cure a la Mode the Movie: Crisply! The Memory of Mille-feuille! (映画 キラキラ☆プリキュアアラモード パリッと！想い出のミルフィーユ！, Eiga Kirakira ☆ Purikyua Ara Mōdo: Paritto! Omoide no Mirufīyu!)	October 28, 2017
15	Star Twinkle Pretty Cure the Movie: These Feeling Within the Song of Stars (映画 スター☆トゥインクルプリキュア 星のうたに想いをこめて, Eiga Sutā ☆ Tuinkuru Purikyua: Hoshi no Uta ni Omoi o Komete)	October 19, 2019
16	Healin' Good Pretty Cure the Movie: GoGo! Big Transformation! The Town of Dreams (映画 ヒーリングっど♡プリキュア ゆめのまちでキュン！っとGoGo！大変身！！, Eiga Hīrin Guddo Purikyua Yume no Machi de Kyun! tto GoGo! Daihenshin!!)	March 20, 2021
17	Tropical-Rouge! Pretty Cure the Movie: The Snow Princess and the Miraculous Ring! (映画 トロピカル～ジュ！プリキュア 雪のプリンセスと奇跡の指輪！, Eiga Toropikarūju Purikuya Yuki no Purinsesu to Kiseki no Yubiwa!)	October 23, 2021
18	Delicious Party Pretty Cure the Movie: Dreaming Children's Lunch! (映画デリシャスパーティ♡プリキュア 夢みる♡お子さまランチ！, Eiga Derishasu Pāti♡Purikyua: Yume Miru ♡ Okosama Rānchu!)	September 23, 2022
19	Wonderful Pretty Cure! The Movie: A Grand Adventure in a Thrilling Game World! (わんだふるぷりきゅあ！ざ・むーびー！ドキドキ♡ゲームの世界で大冒険, Wandafuru Purikyua! Za・Mūbī! Dokidoki ♡ Gēmu no Sekai de Daibōken!)	September 13, 2024
20	You and Idol Pretty Cure the Movie: For You! Our Kirakilala Concert! (映画キミとアイドルプリキュア♪ お待たせ！キミに届けるキラッキライブ！, Eiga Kimi to Aidoru Purikyua ♪ Omatase! Kimi ni Todokeru Kirakiraibu!)	September 12, 2025
21	Star Detective Precure! the Movie: The Mysterious Garden and The Pair's Secret (映画名探偵プリキュア！不思議な庭と2人の秘密, Eiga Meitantei Purikyua! Fushigina niwa to 2-ri no himitsu)	September 18, 2026

== Video games ==
Certain video games in the Pretty Cure franchise produced by Bandai also feature cross-overs. Data Carddass arcade machines based on the franchise have been released since 2007, allowing players to use collectible cards. These machines are updated as new series are released. Yes! Pretty Cure 5 Go Go: Let's Go Together! Dream Festival (Yes！プリキュア5GoGo！ 全員しゅーGo!ドリームフェスティバル, Iesu! PuriKyua Faibu GoGō!: Zenin ShūGo! Dorīmu Fesutibaru), released for Nintendo DS on October 30, 2008, is a side-scrolling beat 'em up featuring characters from Max Heart, Splash Star and Yes! PreCure 5 GoGo. PreCure All Stars: All Together☆Let's Dance (プリキュアオールスターズ ぜんいんしゅうごう☆レッツダンス！, PuriKyua Ōru Sutāzu: Zenin Shūgo☆Rettsu Dansu!) is a music game released for the Wii on March 28, 2013. The game allows players to dance to theme songs from all of the Pretty Cure series up to Dokidoki! PreCure.

== Box office ==
Pretty Cure All Stars New Stage 2: Friends of the Heart grossed US$10.1 million. By April 20, 2014, Pretty Cure All Stars New Stage 3: Eternal Friends had grossed US$8,526,335 in Japan. Pretty Cure All Stars: Spring Carnival♪ grossed $1,073,800 on its opening weekend.

== See also ==
For characters that appear in the films:

- Futari wa Pretty Cure#Characters
- Futari wa Pretty Cure Splash Star#Characters
- Yes! PreCure 5#Characters
- Fresh Pretty Cure!#Characters
- HeartCatch PreCure!#Characters
- Suite PreCure#Characters
- Smile PreCure!#Characters
- DokiDoki! PreCure#Characters
- HappinessCharge Pretty Cure!#Characters
- Go! Princess Pretty Cure#Characters
- Witchy Pretty Cure!#Characters
- List of Kirakira Pretty Cure a la Mode characters
- Hug! Pretty Cure#Characters
- Star Twinkle PreCure#Characters
- Healin' Good Pretty Cure#Characters
- Tropical-Rouge! Pretty Cure#Characters
- Delicious Party Pretty Cure#Characters
- Soaring Sky! Pretty Cure#Characters
