= Pretty Cure All Stars: Spring Carnival =

2015 film by Junji Shimizu

Pretty Cure All Stars: Spring Carnival♪
- Kanji: 映画 プリキュアオールスターズ 春のカーニバル♪
- Revised Hepburn: Eiga Purikyua Ōru Sutāzu: Haru no Kānibaru♪
- Directed by: Junji Shimizu
- Screenplay by: Mio Inoue
- Based on: Pretty Cure by Izumi Todo
- Starring: see below
- Cinematography: Kenji Takahashi
- Edited by: Yoshihiro Aso
- Music by: Yasuharu Takanashi
- Production company: Toei Animation
- Distributed by: Toei Company, Ltd.
- Release date: March 14, 2015
- Running time: 74 minutes
- Country: Japan
- Language: Japanese

Pretty Cure All Stars: Spring Carnival♪ (Japanese: 映画 プリキュアオールスターズ 春のカーニバル♪, Hepburn: Eiga Purikyua Ōru Sutāzu: Haru no Kānibaru♪) is a 2015 Japanese animated action fantasy film based on the Pretty Cure franchise created by Izumi Todo. The film is directed by Junji Shimizu, written by Mio Inoue, and produced by Toei Animation. The film was released in Japan on March 14, 2015.

Marking the seventh entry to the Pretty Cure All Stars crossover film series, the Go! Princess PreCure team joins the previous Pretty Cure teams to a Spring Carnival in a musical kingdom of Harmonia.

== Plot ==
While waiting to go shopping, Minami compliments Haruka's singing, but Kirara freaks her out as she mentions a singing exam. Then, the Pretty Cures receive an invitation to a Spring Carnival taking place in the musical kingdom of Harmonia. At the same time, two devious criminals Odoren and Utaen captured the kingdom. As they arrive, Go! Princess PreCure team introduce themselves to the HappinessCharge PreCure! team: Megumi, Hime, Yūko and Iona, whom are surprised by the new Cures. Posing as the royals, Odoren asks the Pretty Cures to perform on stage to show their appreciation for the fairies, which puts more pressure on Haruka.

As each of the Pretty Cures perform, Odoren and his partner Utaen secretly capture their fairies and steal their transformation items. Near the end of the carnival, Odoren, having obtained everyone's items, seals them away in a chest so they can no longer transform. However, Haruka, believing in the power of song, sings alongside Minami and Kirara, awakening Dress Up Keys that frees the locked away items.

Working together, the Cures fight off Odoren's minions and free the captured royal family, who reveal the festival was meant to appease a dragon who guards over Harmonia. Enraged by the festival being interrupted, the kingdom's deity dragon awakens and unleashes its anger upon the kingdom. However, by using the keys formed from their song, the Go! Princess team, with the power of all the Cures to transform into the "Primevera Elegant Mode", and uses the "Pretty Cure Rainbow Tornado" to calm down the dragon. With royal family's gratitude and the deity's request, the Go! Princess team takes the stage, while Odoren and Utaen ends up as the kingdom's janitors.

Haruka, Minami and Kirara heads back to school, though Haruka is more determined to sing and ace the exam.

== Voice cast ==
Go! Princess PreCure cast

- Yū Shimamura as Haruka Haruno/Cure Flora
- Masumi Asano as Minami Kaido/Cure Mermaid
- Hibiku Yamamura as Kirara Amanogawa/Cure Twinkle
- Nao Tōyama as Pafu
- Shiho Kokido as Aroma

HappinessCharge PreCure! cast

- Megumi Nakajima as Megumi Aino/Cure Lovely
- Megumi Han as Hime Shirayuki/Cure Princess
- Rina Kitagawa as Yūko Omori/Cure Honey
- Haruka Tomatsu as Iona Hikawa/Cure Fortune
- Naoko Matsui as Ribbon
- Miyuki Koburi as Glassun

DokiDoki! PreCure cast

- Hitomi Nabatame as Mana Aida/Cure Heart
- Minako Kotobuki as Rikka Hishikawa/Cure Diamond

Smile PreCure! cast

- Misato Fukuen as Miyuki Hoshizora/Cure Happy
- Asami Tano as Akane Hino/Cure Sunny

Suite PreCure cast

- Ami Koshimizu as Hibiki Hojo/Cure Melody

HeartCatch PreCure! cast

- Nana Mizuki as Tsubomi Hanasaki/Cure Blossom
- Fumie Mizusawa as Erika Kurumi/Cure Marine

Fresh Pretty Cure! cast

- Kanae Oki as Love Momozono/Cure Peach

Yes! PreCure 5 GoGo! cast

- Yūko Sanpei as Nozomi Yumehara/Cure Dream

Futari wa Pretty Cure Splash Star cast

- Orie Kimoto as Saki Hyuga/Cure Bloom/Cure Bright

Futari wa Pretty Cure Max Heart cast

- Yōko Honna as Nagisa Misumi/Cure Black
- Yukana as Honoka Yukishiro/Cure White
- Tomokazu Seki as Mepple

Film characters

- Atsuhiko Nakata as Odoren
- Shingo Fujimori as Utaen

Three members of Morning Musume: Haruna Iikubo, Ayumi Ishida, and Sakura Oda voiced few fairies based on them.

== Production ==
In November 2014, it was announced that the next Pretty Cure All Stars film was in the works, with Junji Shimizu directing the film, with Mio Inoue providing the screenplay, and Yasuharu Takanashi providing the musical score.

The film features two version of the theme song, titled "Ima koko kara" (イマココカラ; lit. "Starting From Here"). The first version, sung by the voice actresses of Pretty Cure All Stars is used as an insert song for the film, while Japanese girl group Morning Musume sung the second version, which was used for the ending.

== Release ==
The film was released in theaters in Japan on March 14, 2015.
