= Yuta Tanaka =

Japanese anime director (born 1981)

- 田中 裕太
- Born: July 8, 1981 (age 44); Mie Prefecture, Japan
- Occupation: Anime director
- Years active: 2005–present
- Employer: Toei Animation (2005–2024)
- Known for: Pretty Cure series

Japanese name
- Kanji: 田中 裕太
- Hiragana: たなか ゆうた
- Romanization: Tanaka Yūta

Yuta Tanaka (Japanese: 田中 裕太, Hepburn: Tanaka Yūta; born July 8, 1981) is a Japanese anime director, who is known for directing various episode of the Pretty Cure series, as well as a series director for its twelfth series, Go! Princess Pretty Cure.

== Career ==
Yuta Tanaka entered the anime industry in 2005. Employed under Toei Animation, he first worked as an assistant episode director for Powerpuff Girls Z, and later directed various episodes of the Pretty Cure series since Fresh Pretty Cure!. In 2015, he directed the twelfth Pretty Cure series, titled Go! Princess Pretty Cure, and also directed few movies since then, such as Witchy Pretty Cure! The Movie: Wonderous! Cure Mofurun!, Star Twinkle Pretty Cure the Movie: These Feeling within The Song of Stars, and Pretty Cure All Stars F. In January 2024, Tanaka had resigned from Toei Animation.

== Filmography ==
=== TV Anime ===
| Year | Title | Credit | Note |
|---|---|---|---|
| 2006 | Powerpuff Girls Z | Assistant Episode Director (eps. 3, 9, 12, 16, 20, 23, 29, 34, 36, 41, 49) | |
| 2007–2008 | Yes! PreCure 5 | Assistant Episode Director (eps. 48) | |
| 2008–2009 | Yes! PreCure 5 GoGo! | Assistant Episode Director (eps. 1, 5, 8, 12, 14, 16, 18, 21, 25, 27, 29, 32, 37, 39, 41, 43, 46) | |
| 2009–2010 | Fresh Pretty Cure! | Episode Director (eps. 4, 17, 32, 44, 49), Assistant Episode Director (eps. 1, 8, 11, 15, 21, 24, 26, 28, 38, 41, 46) | |
| 2010–2011 | HeartCatch PreCure! | Assistant Episode Director | |
| 2011–2012 | Suite PreCure | Episode Director (eps. 4, 12, 23, 30, 38, 47) | |
| 2012–2013 | Smile PreCure! | Episode Director (eps. 8, 15, 22, 36, 43) | |
| 2013–2014 | DokiDoki! PreCure | Episode Director (eps. 4, 12, 17, 26, 33), Storyboard (eps. 4, 12, 26, 33, 40, 47) | |
| 2014–2015 | Majin Bone | Episode Director (eps. 6, 15) | |
| 2015–2016 | Go! Princess Pretty Cure | Series Director, Episode Director (eps. 1, 22, 50), Storyboard (OP; eps. 1, 22, 32, 39, 50), Unit Director (OP) | |
| 2016–2017 | Witchy Pretty Cure! | Storyboard (eps. 22) | |
| 2017–2018 | Digimon Universe: Appli Monsters | Episode Director (eps. 49), Storyboard (eps. 27, 36, 41, 49) | |
| 2018–2019 | Hug! Pretty Cure | Episode Director (eps. 4, 15, 37) | |
| 2018–2020 | GeGeGe no Kitarō | Production Advancement (eps. 78, 85, 88, 95) | |
| 2019–2020 | Star Twinkle PreCure | Storyboard (eps. 15) | |
| 2020–2021 | Healin' Good Pretty Cure | Storyboard (OP) | |
| 2020–2021 | Digimon Adventure: | Production Advancement (eps. 18, 26, 36, 44, 52, 58, 64) | |
| 2020–2022 | Dragon Quest: The Adventure of Dai | Episode Director (eps. 13, 19, 25, 32, 97), Storyboard (eps. 19, 25, 32, 97) | |
| 2021–2022 | Tropical-Rouge! Pretty Cure | Episode Director (eps. 29) | |
| 2021–2023 | Digimon Ghost Game | Episode Director (eps. 20), Production Advancement (eps. 4) | |

=== Anime film ===
| Year | Title | Credit | Note |
|---|---|---|---|
| 2010 | HeartCatch PreCure! the Movie: Fashion Show in the Flower Capital…Really!? | Assistant Director, Storyboard (ED), Unit Director | |
| 2016 | Witchy Pretty Cure! The Movie: Wonderous! Cure Mofurun! | Director | |
| 2019 | One Piece: Stampede | Storyboard | |
| 2019 | Star Twinkle Pretty Cure the Movie: These Feeling within The Song of Stars | Director | |
| 2023 | Pretty Cure All Stars F | Director, Storyboard | |
