= Jin Tanaka =

Japanese screenwriter (born 1976)

- 田中 仁
- Born: 20 September 1976 (age 49); Tokyo, Japan
- Occupation: Anime screenwriter
- Writing career
- Notable works: Pretty Cure (Go! Princess & Kirakira a la Mode); Laid-Back Camp; Love Live! Nijigasaki High School Idol Club; The Misfit of Demon King Academy; Oshi no Ko

Jin Tanaka (Japanese: 田中 仁, Hepburn: Tanaka Jin; born 20 September 1976) is a Japanese anime screenwriter. He has served as the head writer for anime such as Go! Princess PreCure, Kirakira Pretty Cure a la Mode, Laid-Back Camp, Love Live! Nijigasaki High School Idol Club, The Misfit of Demon King Academy, and Oshi no Ko.

== Biography ==
Tanaka, a native of Tokyo, was born on 20 September 1976. He was educated at the Toei Animation Research Institute.

Tanaka joined Toei Animation's Pretty Cure franchise as the writer of the fifth episode of DokiDoki! PreCure, and Go! Princess PreCure (2015–2016) was the first anime in which he was in charge of series composition. After serving as the screenwriter for Witchy Pretty Cure! The Movie: Wonderous! Cure Mofurun! (2016), he was the head writer for Kirakira Pretty Cure a la Mode (2017–2018). He has also served as screenwriter for two more Pretty Cure flms: Star Twinkle Pretty Cure the Movie: These Feeling within The Song of Stars (2019) and Delicious Party Pretty Cure the Movie: Dreaming Children's Lunch (2022).

In 2016, Tanaka was the head writer for Anne Happy. From 2018 to 2021, he was the head writer for both seasons of Laid-Back Camp, and he was the screenwriter for the franchise's 2022 film adaptation Laid-Back Camp Movie. In 2019, he was the head writer for Cinderella Nine. From 2020 to 2022, he was the head writer for Love Live! Nijigasaki High School Idol Club. From 2020 to 2024, he was the head writer for The Misfit of Demon King Academy. In 2023, Tanaka was announced as the head writer of Oshi no Ko.

== Works ==
=== TV series ===
- Go! Princess PreCure (2015–2016, head writer)
- Anne Happy (2016, head writer)
- Kirakira Pretty Cure a la Mode (2017–2018, head writer)
- Laid-Back Camp (2018–2021, head writer)
- Cinderella Nine (2019, head writer)
- Love Live! Nijigasaki High School Idol Club (2020–2022, head writer)
- The Misfit of Demon King Academy (2020–2024, head writer)
- Oshi no Ko (2023–present, head writer)
- Kinokoinu: Mushroom Pup (2024, head writer)
- Kowloon Generic Romance (2025, head writer)
- Fool Night (2026, head writer)

=== Films ===
- Witchy Pretty Cure! The Movie: Wonderous! Cure Mofurun! (2016, screenwriter)
- Star Twinkle Pretty Cure the Movie: These Feeling Within the Song of Stars (2019, screenwriter)
- Laid-Back Camp Movie (2022, screenwriter)
- Delicious Party Pretty Cure the Movie: Dreaming Children's Lunch (2022, screenwriter)
- Pretty Cure All Stars F (2023, screenwriter)
