= Star Twinkle Pretty Cure the Movie: These Feeling Within the Song of Stars =

2019 film by Yuta Tanaka

Star Twinkle Pretty Cure the Movie: These Feeling within The Song of Stars
- Cover of the Blu-ray release by Marvelous!
- Japanese: 映画 スター☆トゥインクルプリキュア 星のうたに想いをこめて
- Revised Hepburn: Eiga Sutā ☆ Tuinkuru Purikyua: Hoshi no Uta ni Omoi o Komete
- Directed by: Yuta Tanaka
- Screenplay by: Jin Tanaka
- Based on: Pretty Cure by Izumi Todo
- Starring: Eimi Naruse; Konomi Kohara; Kiyono Yasuno; Mikako Komatsu; Sumire Uesaka; Hina Kino; Hiroyuki Yoshino
- Cinematography: Yoshiyuki Anzai
- Music by: Yuki Hayashi; Asami Tachibana
- Production company: Toei Animation
- Distributed by: Toei Company, Ltd.
- Release date: October 19, 2019
- Running time: 72 minutes
- Country: Japan
- Language: Japanese
- Box office: US$5.23 million

Star Twinkle Pretty Cure the Movie: These Feeling within The Song of Stars (Japanese: 映画スター☆トゥインクルプリキュア 星のうたに想いをこめて, Hepburn: Eiga Sutā ☆ Tuinkuru Purikyua: Hoshi no Uta ni Omoi o Komete) is a 2019 Japanese animated action fantasy film based on the Pretty Cure franchise created by Izumi Todo, and its sixteenth series, Star Twinkle PreCure. The film is directed by Yuta Tanaka, written by Jin Tanaka, and produced by Toei Animation. The film was released in Japan on October 19, 2019.

In the film, Hikaru and Lala befriend an Unidentified Mysterious Animal (UMA), and goes on an adventure around the world.

== Plot ==
In space, Cures Star, Milky, Soleil, Selene and Cosmo battle Tenjo and the Notrei army. During the battle, as a meteor shower approaches, Milky is hit by a Star Drop. A police detective named Mary Anne arrives and assists the Cures, forcing Tenjo to retreat. As Mary Anne tries to arrest Cosmo, she escapes with Milky's rocket.

The next morning at Hikaru's house, the star drop that fell on Lala is shown to be alive. It grows an antenna and a body and transports them to Okinawa after hearing Hikaru's wish, and Hikaru decides to name the creature UMA (Unidentified Mysterious Animal). Elena and Madoka, who are at Okinawa on vacation, are surprised by Hikaru's abrupt appearance. Lala briefly argues with UMA, which upsets it, but Lala hums a tune to calm it down. After Elena and Madoka meet UMA for the first time, the group travels to various places around the world. Meanwhile, Mary Anne halts her pursuit of Yuni, whom realizes that a group of alien hunters are heading towards Earth.

The Hunters: Gyro III, Hydro, Burn, Dive and Chop land on Earth and demand that Hikaru and Lala hand over UMA. Elena, Madoka and Yuni arrive to aid the duo, and the group transforms to fight. After being overwhelmed by the Hunters, Fuwa uses the power of the Miracle Light, which allows the Cures to use the power of the Star Princesses. After capturing the Hunters, Mary Anne explains that she has to take UMA, which Lala refuses. Burn breaks free and captures UMA, who becomes unstable and grows to a size similar to Earth.

Desperate to stop UMA from going berserk, the Cures make their way to it while facing various groups of Hunters. Milky expresses her regret at not letting UMA go, and she and Star sing a song to UMA, with Soleil, Selene and Cosmo joining in. With UMA restored, it creates a new planet before reaching its final form and bidding Star and Milky goodbye.

In the credits, Mary Anne successfully captures the Hunters and leaves Earth, while Hikaru and Lala assure each other that they'll reunite with UMA someday.

== Voice cast ==
- Eimi Naruse as Hikaru Hoshina/Cure Star
- Konomi Kohara as Lala Hagoromo/Cure Milky
- Kiyono Yasuno as Elena Amamiyama/Cure Soleil
- Mikako Komatsu as Madoka Kaguya/Cure Selene
- Sumire Uesaka as Yuni/Cure Cosmo
- Hina Kino as Fuwa
- Hiroyuki Yoshino as Prunce
- Rina Chinen as Mary Anne
- Takayuki Hamatsu as Gyro III
- Yui Ishikawa as Hydro
- Shunsuke Sakuya as Burn
- Jin Katagiri as Dive
- Ryūsuke Komakine as Chop

Aya Endō briefly voices Tenjou in the beginning of the film. Newscaster Takehiko Ueda also makes a cameo appearance as himself.

== Production ==
In June 2019, it was announced that a standalone film for Star Twinkle PreCure was in development, with Yuta Tanaka and Jin Tanaka as director and screenwriter respectively, whom both previously worked on the Go! Princess PreCure series and Witchy Pretty Cure! The Movie: Wonderous! Cure Mofurun! film. In September 2019, it was announced that Takayuki Hamatsu, Yui Ishikawa, Shunsuke Sakuya, Jin Katagiri and Ryūsuke Komakine were cast as UMA hunters: Gyro III, Hydro, Burn, Dive and Chop respectively. The film also featured newscaster Takehiko Ueda in a cameo appearance as himself.

The film features two versions of the song, titled "Twinkle Stars". The first version is used as an insert song, sung by the voice actresses of Star Twinkle PreCure, while the second version is used as an ending song sung by Rina Chinen, who also voices Mary Anne in the film.

== Release ==
The film was released in theaters in Japan on October 19, 2019.

== Reception ==
=== Box office ===
The film dropped from 6th to 7th place out of top 10 in the Japanese box office in its third week, and later dropped off the top 10 list in its fourth week.
