= The Misfit of Demon King Academy =

Japanese light novel series and its adaptations

- First light novel volume cover, featuring (from left to right) Misha Necron, Anos Voldigoad, and Sasha Necron

魔王学院の不適合者 ～史上最強の魔王の始祖、転生して子孫たちの学校へ通う～ (Maō Gakuin no Futekigōsha ~Shijō Saikyō no Maō no Shiso, Tensei Shite Shison-tachi no Gakkō e Kayou~)
- Genre: Adventure; Fantasy; Romance
- Novel series
- Written by: Shu
- Published by: Shōsetsuka ni Narō
- Original run: April 2, 2017 – January 25, 2026
- Light novel
- Written by: Shu
- Illustrated by: Yoshinori Shizuma
- Published by: ASCII Media Works
- English publisher: NA: J-Novel Club Yen Press (print)
- Imprint: Dengeki Bunko
- Original run: March 10, 2018 – August 8, 2025
- Volumes: 17 (Note: Twenty-two light novels in total have been released including the second parts of volumes 4, 10, 12, 13, and 14.)
- Manga
- Illustrated by: Kayaharuka
- Published by: Square Enix
- English publisher: NA: Square Enix
- Magazine: Manga Up!
- Original run: July 24, 2018 – July 10, 2021
- Volumes: 4
- Anime television series
- Directed by: Shin Oonuma (chief); Masafumi Tamura
- Produced by: List: Yoshinori Hasegawa; Nobuhiro Nakayama; Tomoyuki Oowada; Yuusuke Yoshioka; Gorou Ishida (S1); Takeshi Ishigaki (S1); Takumi Itou (S1); Shiryuu Kitazawa (S1); Aya Iizuka (S1–S2P1); Yuuki Yamaoka (S1–S2P1); Youhei Hata (S2); Kouichi Kogako (S2); Rieko Nagamine (S2); Hiroya Nakata (S2); Chiho Shibayama (S2P2); Shuka Nishimae (S2P2); Toshiya Niikura (S2P2)
- Written by: Jin Tanaka
- Music by: Keiji Inai
- Studio: Silver Link
- Licensed by: NA: Aniplex of America; SEA: Plus Media Networks Asia
- Original network: Tokyo MX, GYT, GTV, BS11, AT-X, TVA, YTV
- English network: SEA: Aniplus Asia
- Original run: July 4, 2020 – July 25, 2024
- Episodes: 37
- icon

The Misfit of Demon King Academy: History's Strongest Demon King Reincarnates and Goes to School with His Descendants, (Note: Japanese: 魔王学院の不適合者 ～史上最強の魔王の始祖、転生して子孫たちの学校へ通う～, Hepburn: Maō Gakuin no Futekigōsha ~Shijō Saikyō no Maō no Shiso, Tensei Shite Shison-tachi no Gakkō e Kayou~) also known simply as The Misfit of Demon King Academy (Note: Japanese: 魔王学院の不適合者, Hepburn: Maō Gakuin no Futekigōsha; From the English title at the logo of anime version) or Demon King Academy, (Note: Japanese: 魔王学院, Hepburn: Maō Gakuin; From the address of anime's official website (both English and Japanese version)) is a Japanese light novel series written by Shu and illustrated by Yoshinori Shizuma. The series originally began as a web novel in April 2017 on the user-generated novel publishing website Shōsetsuka ni Narō when it was later acquired by ASCII Media Works, which published it from March 2018 to August 2025. A manga adaptation by Kayaharuka was serialized online from July 2018 to July 2021, when it ended due to the author's death. An anime television series adaptation produced by Silver Link aired from July to September 2020. A second season aired from January 2023 to July 2024.

== Plot ==
After years of countless wars and strife, the demon king Anos Voldigoad made a deal with the human hero, Kanon, to sacrifice his own life to ensure peace could flourish. Reincarnating 2,000 years later, Anos finds that royal demons now harshly rule over lower class hybrid demons in a society that values Anos's pureblood descendants over the demons who interbred with other species, such as humans and spirits. He runs into several issues such as demons and their magic being extremely weak due to the peace he created, and a false demon king known as Avos Dilhevia ruling, with his own name forgotten. He seeks to unravel the mysteries behind this false king, dealing with foes, old friends, and the biggest problem: graduating from the Demon King Academy, where he is labeled a total misfit.

== Characters ==
Anos Voldigoad (アノス・ヴォルディゴード, Anosu Vorudigōdo)
Voiced by: Tatsuhisa Suzuki (season 1), Yūichirō Umehara (season 2) (Japanese); Aleks Le (English)
The reincarnated demon king who existed 2,000 years prior to the start of the series. He is absurdly powerful and extremely intelligent, but also a kind and wise ruler. Anos was the one who wanted peace the most, and sacrificed himself to create walls between the four races so that their rage and conflict would die out. He values his subordinates and friends greatly. He also has a very close and comical relationship with his mother and father.
Misha Necron (ミーシャ・ネクロン, Mīsha Nekuron)
Voiced by: Tomori Kusunoki (Japanese); Brianna Knickerbocker (English)
A girl who had met Anos on the day of Demon King Academy's entrance exam, then made friends with him. She is the younger twin sister of Sasha, who is a descendant of Ivis Necron, but Misha is not considered a pureblood like her sister. She loves Anos since he saved her and "destroyed" her fate.
Sasha Necron (サーシャ・ネクロン, Sāsha Nekuron)
Voiced by: Yūko Natsuyoshi (Japanese); Kayli Mills (English)
Misha's elder twin sister. She is the original descendant of Ivis Necron (one of the seven Elder Demon Emperors) and is known as the Witch of Destruction due to her Demon Eyes of Destruction. She also loves Anos due to him saving Misha. However, she tends to be a tsundere about her feelings. She gets extremely flustered when Anos gets close or compliments her demon eyes of destruction.
Lay Glanzudlii (レイ・グランズドリィ, Rei Guranzudori)
Voiced by: Takuma Terashima (Japanese); Griffin Puatu (English)
A transfer student who is a member of the Generation of Chaos. He is also the reincarnation of Hero Kanon. He's extremely happy that in this lifetime, he can be friends with Anos as they promised. As Kanon, he greatly respected and admired Anos. He feels guilty that he and others were too weak to end the war, resulting in Anos "slumbering" all alone. He is very talented with a sword. He is romantically interested in Misa.
Misa Ilioroagu (ミサ・イリオローグ, Misa Iriorōgu)
Voiced by: Nene Hieda (Japanese); Jackie Lastra (English)
A classmate of Anos' who is a Unitarian. She happens to be the daughter of Great Spirit Leno. She likes Lay romantically.
Eleonore Bianca (エレオノール・ビアンカ, Ereonōru Bianka)
Voiced by: Sayumi Watabe (Japanese); Abby Trott (English)
An exchange student from the Hero Academy who belongs to the Selection Class "Jerga Kanon" in the academy. She is revealed to be a type of magic the humans wanted to abuse to create clones (her "children" known as Zeshia) to invade the demons. However, Anos saves her and makes her his own magic, giving her and her "children" freedom. She is quite fond of Anos, like Misha and Sasha.
Zeshia Bianca (ゼシア・ビアンカ)
Voiced by: Misaki Kuno (Japanese); Lisa Reimold (English)
At first she was thought to be a reincarnation of the Hero Kanon, but then it was revealed that she was actually a mass-produced source clone created by Eleonore Bianca.
Shin Reglia (シン・レグリア, Shin Reguria)
Voiced by: Wataru Hatano (Japanese); Daman Mills (English)
A swordsman who was Anos' right-hand man 2,000 years prior to the start of the series.
Great Spirit Leno (大精霊レノ, Dai Seirei Reno)
Voiced by: Kana Asumi (Japanese); Kira Buckland (English)
She is considered as the ruler and mother of all spirits.
Kanon (カノン)
Voiced by: Ryōta Ōsaka (Japanese); Griffin Burns (English)
A hero who existed 2,000 years prior to the start of the series, who is Lay's reincarnation. Anos greatly respected him, as he never gave up and always fought for the humans. He was known for having seven sources, meaning he would always revive himself despite being killed over and over by Anos. He greatly respected Anos for his ideals and desire for peace. He was killed by humans shortly after Anos sacrificed himself, as they wanted to kill Anos after he reincarnated and didn't care about peace.
Emilia Ludowell (エミリア・ルードウェル, Emiria Rūdoweru)
Voiced by: Ami Koshimizu (Japanese); Dawn M. Bennett (English)
Anos's former homeroom teacher who was a pureblood royal and daughter of Elio Ludowell, the Demon Lord of Midhaze. After attacking Anos' mother, she was later killed and reincarnated into a half-blood (hybrid). She eventually sees the world from a hybrid's perspective, and comes to see her mistakes. She eventually becomes a teacher at the hero academy.
Zepes Indu (ゼペス・インドゥ, Zepesu Indu)
Voiced by: Takuya Eguchi (Japanese); Zeno Robinson (English)
A demon duke from the Indu Family and brother of Leorig.
Leorig Indu (リオルグ・インドゥ, Riorugu Indu)
Voiced by: Shinnosuke Tachibana (Japanese); Nazeeh Tarsha (English)
One of the Demon Lords and the heir of the Indu Family.

== Media ==
=== Light novel ===
The series was first published online as a web novel in April 2017 on the user-generated novel publishing website Shōsetsuka ni Narō by Shu. It was later acquired by ASCII Media Works, who published seventeen volumes of it as a light novel under their Dengeki Bunko imprint from March 2018 to August 2025. The light novel is licensed in North America by J-Novel Club. At Anime NYC 2022, J-Novel Club announced that the light novel would be released in print by Yen Press.

==== Volumes ====
No.	Original release date	Original ISBN	English release date	English ISBN
1	March 10, 2018	978-4-04-893681-1	June 26, 2022 (digital); July 18, 2023 (print)	978-1-7183-8748-5 (digital); 978-1-9753-7305-4 (print)
2	July 10, 2018	978-4-04-893920-1	September 22, 2022 (digital); November 21, 2023 (print)	978-1-7183-8750-8 (digital); 978-1-9753-7404-4 (print)
3	November 10, 2018	978-4-04-912096-7	January 5, 2023 (digital); April 16, 2024 (print)	978-1-7183-8752-2 (digital); 978-1-9753-7405-1 (print)
4a	March 9, 2019	978-4-04-912327-2	April 6, 2023 (digital); August 20, 2024 (print)	978-1-7183-8754-6 (digital); 978-1-9753-8913-0 (print)
4b	May 10, 2019	978-4-04-912453-8	July 6, 2023 (digital); December 17, 2024 (print)	978-1-7183-8756-0 (digital); 978-1-9753-9104-1 (print)
5	October 10, 2019	978-4-04-912664-8	November 9, 2023 (digital); April 15, 2025 (print)	978-1-7183-8758-4 (digital); 978-1-9753-9105-8 (print)
6	March 10, 2020	978-4-04-913074-4	March 15, 2024 (digital); August 12, 2025 (print)	978-1-7183-8760-7 (digital); 978-1-9753-9106-5 (print)
7	July 10, 2020	978-4-04-913273-1	September 6, 2024 (digital); February 10, 2026 (print)	978-1-7183-8762-1 (digital); 978-1-9753-9107-2 (print)
8	October 10, 2020	978-4-04-913448-3	January 17, 2025 (digital); September 8, 2026 (print)	978-1-7183-8764-5 (digital); 978-1-9753-9108-9 (print)
9	April 9, 2021	978-4-04-913734-7	May 15, 2025 (digital); January 12, 2027 (print)	978-1-7183-8766-9 (digital); 978-1-9753-9109-6 (print)
10a	August 6, 2021	978-4-04-913938-9	August 1, 2025 (digital)	978-1-7183-8768-3
10b	October 8, 2021	978-4-04-913939-6	November 12, 2025 (digital)	978-1-7183-8770-6
11	March 10, 2022	978-4-04-914145-0	February 27, 2026 (digital)	978-1-7183-8772-0
12a	August 10, 2022	978-4-04-914532-8	May 22, 2026 (digital)	978-1-7183-8774-4
12b	October 7, 2022	978-4-04-914533-5	August 19, 2026 (digital)	978-1-7183-8776-8
13a	February 10, 2023	978-4-04-914870-1	November 9, 2026 (digital)	978-1-7183-8778-2
13b	May 10, 2023	978-4-04-914874-9	—	—
14a	September 8, 2023	978-4-04-915122-0	—	—
14b	January 10, 2024	978-4-04-915123-7	—	—
15	June 7, 2024	978-4-04-915697-3	—	—
16	November 8, 2024	978-4-04-916083-3	—	—
17	August 8, 2025	978-4-04-916084-0	—	—

=== Manga ===
A manga adaptation with art by Kayaharuka was serialized online via Square Enix's Manga Up! website from July 2018 to July 2021 and was collected in four tankōbon volumes. Square Enix published the manga in English. On July 10, 2021, it was announced that the manga adaptation was cancelled due to Kayaharuka's illness as it was previously claimed they were undergoing treatment. It was later announced on July 13 that Kayaharuka died on July 6 from pancreatic cancer.

==== Volumes ====
No.	Original release date	Original ISBN	English release date	English ISBN
1	November 10, 2018	978-4-7575-5906-6	March 30, 2020	978-1-64609-042-6
2	May 10, 2019	978-4-7575-6112-0	August 25, 2020	978-1-64609-043-3
3	October 10, 2019	978-4-7575-5906-6	January 26, 2021	978-1-64609-044-0
4	March 5, 2021	978-4-7575-7133-4	July 26, 2022	978-1-64609-133-1

=== Anime ===
An anime television series adaptation was announced at the "Dengeki Bunko Aki no Namahōsō Festival" event on October 6, 2019. The anime was originally set to premiere in April 2020, but it was delayed until July 2020 due to production complications resulting from the COVID-19 pandemic. The series was animated by Silver Link and directed by Masafumi Tamura, with Shin Oonuma serving as chief director. Jin Tanaka handled the series composition, while Kazuyuki Yamayoshi designed the characters, and Keiji Inai composed the music. The 13-episode anime aired from July 4 to September 26, 2020. Civilian performed the opening theme "Seikai Fuseikai" (正解不正解; "Correct Incorrect"), while Tomori Kusunoki performed the ending theme "Hamidashimono" (ハミダシモノ; "The Misfit"). Crunchyroll streamed the series.

On September 4, 2020, Aniplex of America announced that the series would receive an English dub, which premiered the following day.

On March 6, 2021, it was announced that the series would receive a second split-cour season with the staff and cast reprising their respective roles. Yūichirō Umehara replaced Tatsuhisa Suzuki as the voice of Anos Voldigoad for the second season. The first cour aired from January 8 to September 24, 2023. The opening theme is "Seien" by Lenny code fiction, while the ending theme is "Esoa" (エソア) by Momosumomosu. On February 11, 2023, it was announced that the seventh episode of the season and beyond would be postponed due to COVID-19. The season restarted broadcasting from the first episode on July 9, 2023. (Note: Tokyo MX listed the restart at 24:30 on July 8, 2023, which is effectively July 9 at 12:30 a.m.) The second cour aired from April 13 to July 25, 2024. (Note: Tokyo MX listed the premiere of the second cour at 24:00 on April 12, 2024, which is effectively April 13 at 12:00 a.m.) The second opening theme is "Maō" (魔王; "Demon King") by Burnout Syndromes and Nao Tōyama, while the second ending theme is "Shingetsu" (シンゲツ; "New Moon") by Tomori Kusunoki.

== Reception ==
=== Sales ===
According to the official English anime website, the light novels has over 2.2 million copies published by 2023.
