= Fresh Pretty Cure! =

Japanese anime television series

- Cover of 8th DVD volume by Marvelous Entertainment featuring (from left to right): Cure Passion, Chiffon and Tart (top), Cure Pine, Cure Peach and Cure Berry

フレッシュプリキュア! (Furesshu PuriKyua!)
- Genre: Magical girl
- Created by: Izumi Todo
- Anime television series
- Directed by: Junji Shimizu (all episodes); Akifumi Zako (assistant director; episodes 16–50)
- Written by: Atsushi Maekawa
- Music by: Yasuharu Takanashi
- Studio: Toei Animation
- Original network: ANN (ABC, TV Asahi)
- English network: HK: TVB
- Original run: February 1, 2009 – January 31, 2010
- Episodes: 50
- Manga
- Written by: Izumi Todo
- Illustrated by: Futago Kamikita
- Published by: Kodansha
- Magazine: Nakayoshi
- Original run: March 2009 – February 2010
- Volumes: 12
- Anime film

Fresh Pretty Cure the Movie: The Kingdom of Toys has Lots of Secrets!?
- Directed by: Junji Shimizu
- Written by: Atsushi Maekawa
- Music by: Yasuharu Takanashi
- Studio: Toei Animation
- Released: October 31, 2009
- Video game

Fresh PreCure! Asobi Collection
- Developer: Namco Bandai Games
- Publisher: Namco Bandai Games
- Genre: Minigame
- Platform: Nintendo DS
- Released: October 29, 2009

Fresh Pretty Cure! (フレッシュプリキュア!, Furesshu PuriKyua!), also known as Fresh PreCure!, is a Japanese magical girl anime series and the sixth in the Pretty Cure metaseries by Izumi Todo, featuring the fourth generation of Cures. The series was produced by Toei Animation, directed by Junji Shimizu (Jigoku Sensei Nube The Movie) and written by Atsushi Maekawa (Bakugan Battle Brawlers, Jewelpet). The character designs were created by Hisashi Kagawa (Saikano, Bomberman Jetters, Phantom Thief Jeanne). The series aired on TV Asahi's ANN network from February 1, 2009, to January 31, 2010, succeeding Yes! PreCure 5 Go Go!'s time slot, and was succeeded by HeartCatch PreCure!.

Fresh Pretty Cure was the first to introduce CG-animated ending themes with dance routines. The series' main themes are happiness and dance, with playing-card suits, fruits and clovers as the Cure's main motifs.

== Story ==
Love Momozono is a 14-year-old second-year student at Yotsuba Junior High School. One day, she goes to see the concert of popular dance unit Trinity, and is inspired by their leader Miyuki to become a dancer herself. When Eas, an agent of Labyrinth, summons a Nakewameke to attack the people. Love's strong feelings to protect them and see Trinity perform live once again resonate with a Linkrun and transform her phone into a transformation device, allowing her to become Cure Peach. Along with Tarte and Chiffon, fairies from the Sweets Kingdom, and her childhood friends Aono Miki and Yamabuki Inori, who become Cure Berry and Cure Pine respectively, they fight against Labyrinth to prevent them from using Infinity to conquer all worlds. They are later joined by Setsuna, who was formerly Eas and becomes Cure Passion.

== Characters ==
=== Pretty Cures ===
Love Momozono (桃園 ラブ, Momozono Rabu) / Cure Peach (キュアピーチ, Kyua Pīchi)
Voiced by: Kanae Oki
The main protagonist. A 14-year-old girl and a second-year student at Yotsuba Junior High School. She is a fan of the dance unit Trinity and is taking dance lessons under Miyuki, their leader who offered her lessons out of gratitude for her saving her from the Nakewameke's attack. Love forms the dance group Clover with her childhood friends Miki and Inori, and later, Setsuna. She has messy, shoulder-length hazel hair which she wears in tight twintails. As Cure Peach, her hair grows to knee-length and is worn in crimped blond twintails. Her theme color is pink, her symbol is the heart, and her fruit motif is the peach. She has the power of love. She introduces herself by saying "The pink heart is the symbol of love! Freshly-picked, Cure Peach!" (ピンクのハートは愛ある印。もぎたてフレッシュ、キュアピーチ!, Pinku no hāto wa ai aru shirushi. Mogitate Furesshu, Kyua Pīchi)
Miki Aono (蒼乃 美希, Aono Miki) Cure Berry (キュアベリー, Kyua Berī)
Voiced by: Eri Kitamura
A 14-year-old girl and a second-year student at Private Torigoe Academy, who is skilled at sports and is an aspiring fashion model. She lives with her mother at their house. Miki joins Love's dance group to maintain her weight. She has long lavender waist-length hair, and as Cure Berry her hair lightens in color and is worn in a curly side ponytail. Her theme colors are blue and purple, her symbol is the spade, and her fruit motif is the blueberry. She has the power of hope. She introduces herself by saying "The blue heart is the symbol of hope! Freshly-gathered, Cure Berry!" (ブルーのハートは希望の印。つみたてフレッシュ、キュアベリー!, Burū no hāto wa kibō no shirushi. Tsumitate furesshu, Kyua Berī!)
Inori Yamabuki (山吹 祈里, Yamabuki Inori) / Cure Pine (キュアパイン, Kyua Pain)
Voiced by: Akiko Nakagawa
A 14-year-old girl and a second-year student at Christian Private White Clover Academy, she loves animals and wants to be a veterinarian. Love sometimes calls her "Buki", a diminutive of her family name. Inori is calm and quiet. She joins Love's dance group to try and open up to others, but sometimes lacks common sense and follows whatever situation she finds herself in. She has short golden orange hair that brightens to golden blond as Cure Pine. Her theme colors are yellow and orange, her symbol is the diamond, and her fruit motif is the pineapple. She has the power of faith/prayer. She introduces herself by saying "The yellow heart is the symbol of prayers! Freshly-harvested, Cure Pine!" (イエローハートは祈りの印! とれたてフレッシュ, キュアパイン!, Ierō Hāto wa Inori no Shirushi! Toretate Furesshu, Kyua Pain!)
Eas (イース, Īsu) / Setsuna Higashi (東 せつな, Higashi Setsuna) / Cure Passion (キュアパッション, Kyua Passhon)
Voiced by: Yuka Komatsu
An agent of Labyrinth who begins as a cold and isolated teenage soldier loyal to Moebius. She infiltrates the girls' friend group to spy on them, but as she spends time with them, she begins to open up to them and wonders what would make her truly happy. After a battle with Cure Peach in which she finally discovers happiness, Eas dies after reaching the end of her predetermined lifespan. However, Akarun and Chiffon revive her as Cure Passion. She takes on the name Setsuna and lives with the Momozono family, joining Love's dance group and attending Yotsuba Junior High School with her. She has dark purple hair as Setsuna, bluish-white hair as Eas and long, fluffy light-pink hair as Cure Passion. Her theme color is red, her symbols are hearts and clovers, and her fruit motif is the passion fruit. She has the power of happiness. She introduces herself by saying "The scarlet heart is the proof of happiness! Freshly-ripened, Cure Passion!" (真っ赤なハートは幸せの証！熟れたてフレッシュ、キュアパッション！, Makka na hāto wa shiawase no akashi! Uretate furesshu, Kyua Passhon!)

=== Sweets Kingdom ===
The Sweets Kingdom (王国スウィーツ, Suwītsu Ōkoku) is a parallel world which this season's fairies are from.

Tart (タルト, Taruto)
Voiced by: Taiki Matsuno
A ferret-like fairy who is Chiffon's caretaker. He is kind and speaks in a Kansai dialect, but despite being anxious and often worrying, he enjoys Kaoru's donuts. Along with Chiffon, he goes to the human world from the Sweets Kingdom to search for the Pretty Cures. He is a prince of the Sweets Kingdom and engaged to Azukina.
Chiffon (シフォン, Shifon) / Infinity (インフィニティ, Infiniti)
Voiced by: Satomi Kōrogi
A baby lamb-like-fairy from the Sweets Kingdom who enjoys practical jokes and who Love and the others care for. She uses "espers power" (ESP—magic with a green aura) to aid people, but her powers sometimes cause trouble. She has a mark on her forehead that acts as a light with several abilities, including giving the Cures power to transform. Her true identity is Infinity, the supercomputer that Labyrinth seeks for its power.
Azukina (アズキーナ, Azukīna)
Voiced by: Mayu Isshiki
A squirrel-like fairy who is Tart's fiancée and is from a kingdom near the Sweets Kingdom. She and Tart have feelings for each other and were arranged to be married to unite their kingdoms. When Tart goes to the human world with Chiffon to search for the Pretty Cures, Azukina is worried about him and is relieved when he returns with the Pretty Cures to visit.
Tiramisu (ティラミス)
Voiced by: Kenichi Ogata
The elder of the Sweets Kingdom, who found and raised Chiffon after a shooting star crashed in the forest, where he found her and the Clover Box. He had heard of a legend that states that "When the clover child falls from the sky, it is an omen of evil. To lay its hand on the child, the Evil One shall arrive. If the Evil One should obtain the child, he shall destroy the world within three days." He summoned the Pickruns and sent Tart and Chiffon to the human world to search for the Pretty Cure.
Waffle (ワッフル, Wafuru)
Voiced by: Hitoshi Horimoto
The king of the Sweets Kingdom and Tart's father.
Madeline (マドレー, Madorēnu)
Voiced by: Nina Kumagaya
The queen of the Sweets Kingdom and Tart's mother.

=== Labyrinth ===
The series' villains are denizens of Labyrinth (ラビリンス, Rabirinsu), who have names derived from the cardinal points of the compass. They summon monsters (voiced by Shintarou Nakano) called Nakewameke (ナケワメーケ, Nakewamēke), Nakisakebe (ナキサケーベ, Nakisakēbe), and Sorewatase (ソレワターセ, Sorewatāse), which acts as a radar for finding Infinity.

Moebius (メビウス, Mebiusu)
Voiced by: Tomomichi Nishimura
A demon and the leader of Labyrinth. who wishes to rule all worlds and considers his subjects to be nothing more than mindless pawns. The finale reveals that Moebius is a robot; the real Moebius was a supercomputer that hypnotized its creators, the people of Labyrinth.
Westar (ウエスター, Uesutā) / Hayato Nishi (西 隼人, Nishi Hayato)
Voiced by: Yasunori Matsumoto
A superficially attractive man who later on becomes comic relief. He seems to have romantic feelings for Eas, and is the one most affected by her betrayal of Moebius. He and Soular die defending Cure Berry and Cure Passion when they are sucked into a black hole, but Chiffon revives them to aid the Pretty Cures.
Soular (サウラー, Saurā) / Shun Minami (南 瞬, Minami Shun)
Voiced by: Kenichi Suzumura
A calm and reserved man who plans his attacks before going on a mission. Along with Westar, he dies defending Cure Berry and Cure Passion when they are sucked into a black hole, but Chiffon revives them to aid the Pretty Cures.
Northa (ノーザ, Nōza) / Nayuta Kita (北 那由他, Kita Nayuta)
Voiced by: Misa Watanabe
The highest-ranking member of Labyrinth, who Moebius summons to retrieve Infinity after deeming Westar and Soular useless. It is later revealed that Moebius created her from the DNA of a plant.
Klein (クライン, Kurain)
Voiced by: Kouji Hiwatari
An elder-looking man who is an aide of Moebius and monitors the people of Labyrinth. It is later revealed that Moebius created him from the DNA of a lizard.

=== Cures' family members ===
Keitaro Momozono (桃園 圭太郎, Momozono Keitarō)
Voiced by: Akimitsu Takase
Love's father, Ayumi's husband, and Setsuna's adoptive father, who works as sales manager for a wig company.
Ayumi Momozono (桃園 あゆみ, Momozono Ayumi)
Voiced by: Kyōko Hikami
Love's mother, Keitaro's wife, and Setsuna's adoptive mother, who works part time at a supermarket. Like her daughter, she is a picky eater and hates spinach. After Setsuna defects and starts living with Love and her family, Ayumi comes to see her as a second daughter.
Genkichi Momozono (桃園源吉, Momozono Genkichi)
Voiced by: Mugihito
A tatami craftsman who was Love's late grandfather and Ayumi's late father, having died before the events of the series.
Remi Aono (蒼乃 レミ, Aono Remi)
Voiced by: Sakiko Uran
A former model and salon owner who is Miki and Kazuki's divorced mother. Her ex-husband, Katsuhiko Ichijo (一条 克彦, Ichijō Katsuhiko), is a music producer who is more prominent in the novel adaptation.
Kazuki Ichijo (一条 和希, Ichijō Kazuki)
Voiced by: KENN
Miki's 13-year-old younger brother, who lives with his father after their parents' divorce. Miki often persuades him to go out with her, disguised as her boyfriend to keep other boys away. He has had low blood pressure since birth, and dreams of being a doctor.
Tadashi Yamabuki (山吹 正, Yamabuki Tadashi)
Voiced by: Masafumi Kimura
Inori's father, who owns a veterinarian clinic. He is bold, generous, and patient with animals.
Naoko Yamabuki (山吹 尚子, Yamabuki Naoko)
Voiced by: Michiko Neya
Inori's mother, who works as an assistant at her husband's clinic.

=== Clover Town Street ===
Clover Town Street (クローバータウンストリート, Kurōbā Taun Sutorīto) is a shopping street where the Cures live.

Miyuki Chinen (ミユキ, Chinen Miyuki)
Voiced by: Mayumi Iizuka
The leader of Trinity (トリニティ, Toriniti), who becomes Love's group-dance coach after she rescues her.
Kaoru Tachibana (橘 薰, Tachibana Kaoru)
Voiced by: Ken Maeda
A donut salesman who supports Love and her group. He has a mysterious past and has had multiple careers.
Daisuke Chinen (知念 大輔, Chinen Daisuke)
Voiced by: Tarusuke Shingaki
A brash, stubborn baseball player and Miyuki's younger brother and classmate. Although they often quarrel, he secretly helps her.
Yuki Sawa (沢 裕喜, Sawa Yūki)
Voiced by: Shinsuke Ueda
A classmate of Love who is attracted to Miki, but she has no interest in dating him.
Kento Mikoshiba (御子柴 健人, Mikoshiba Kento)
Voiced by: Toshiyuki Toyonaga
A gentle and timid classmate of Love who is the heir to the Mikoshiba Zaibatsu. He wears glasses and seems to like Inori.
Reika (レイカ) and Nana (ナナ)
Voiced by: Saori Seto (Reika) and Mayu Isshiki (Nana)
The other two members of Trinity.

=== Guest characters ===
Audrey (オードリー, Ōdorī)
Voiced by: Masayasu Wakabayashi, Toshiaki Kasuga
A comedy duo.

=== Movie characters ===
Usapyon (ウサピョン)
Voiced by: Hiromi Tsuru
A stuffed bunny which Love had as a child and later comes to life.
Toymajin (トイマジン, Toimajin)
Voiced by: Kōzō Shioya (robot form), Chika Sakamoto (teddy bear form)
The main antagonist of the film. He is made up of abandoned toys and seeks revenge against children for loving and then forgetting their toys.
Count Roulette (ルーレット伯爵, Roulette-Hakushaku)
Voiced by: Takashi Tanaka
The secondary antagonist of the film. He is Toymajin's worker who sends the Cures into four different games.

== Media ==
=== Anime ===
The anime series was directed by Junji Shimizu and Akifumi Zako, and aired in Japan on ABC and other ANN stations between February 1, 2009, and January 31, 2010. It has four pieces of theme music: two opening themes and two ending themes. For the first 25 episodes, the opening theme is "Let's! Fresh Pretty Cure" (Let's!フレッシュプリキュア, Rettsu! Furesshu Purikyua) by Mizuki Moie, and the ending theme is "You make me happy!" by Momoko Hayashi. For episodes 26–50 the opening theme is "Let's! Fresh Pretty Cure! ~Hybrid Version~" (Let's!フレッシュプリキュア~Hybrid.ver~, Rettsu! Furesshu Purikyua ~Hybrid.ver~) by Mizuki Moie and Momoko Hayashi, and the ending theme is "H@ppy Together" by Momoko Hayashi. A major change for the ending movies is a dance choreography by the Fresh Pretty Cure members, making it as a mainstray for the Pretty Cure franchise.

The anime later reaired on TV Asahi's cable channel, TeleAsa Channel 1, in April 2018.

=== Films ===
The heroines also appeared in Pretty Cure All Stars films, beginning with Pretty Cure All Stars DX: Everyone's Friends☆the Collection of Miracles! (プリキュアオールスターズDX みんなともだちっ☆奇跡の全員大集合!, PuriKyua Ōru Sutāzu Dirakkusu: Minna Tomodachi☆Kiseki no Zenin Daishūgō) released March 14, 2009.

A film, based on the series, entitled Movie Fresh Pretty Cure! The Kingdom of Toys has Lots of Secrets!? (映画フレッシュプリキュア! おもちゃの国は秘密がいっぱい!?, Eiga Furesshu Purikyua! Omocha no Kuni wa Himitsu ga Ippai!?) premiered in Japan October 31, 2009.

=== Video games ===
A video game based on the series, titled Fresh Pretty Cure! Asobi Collection (フレッシュプリキュア!あそびコレクション, Furesshu Purikyua! Asobi Korekushon), was released by Bandai for the Nintendo DS on October 29, 2009.

== Reception ==
Despite deviating greatly from the franchise's formula, the series was a success, which saved the franchise from its cancellation. Series headwriter Atsushi Maekawa stated during the Pretty Cure Thanksgiving Screening Event vol. 2 in Japan that "Fresh was a new experimental work, and it was my first time participating in the series, so it was a case of trial and error over and over again. If Fresh had failed, the series would've ended there. If it was a success, it would've continued forever... that was the high hurdle."

Preceded by Yes! PreCure 5 Go Go!	Fresh Pretty Cure! 2009-2010	Succeeded by HeartCatch PreCure!
