= Orie Kimoto =

Japanese voice actress (born 1979)

- 樹元 オリエ
- Born: Naoko Yabuta (薮田 尚子, Yabuta Naoko); January 26, 1979 (age 47); Tokyo, Japan
- Occupations: Actress; voice actress
- Years active: 2004–present
- Notable work: Futari wa Pretty Cure Splash Star as Saki Hyuuga/Cure Bloom/Cure Bright
- Spouse: Riichiro Inagaki
- Children: 3

Naoko Yabuta (薮田 尚子, Yabuta Naoko; born January 26, 1979), known by her stage name Orie Kimoto (樹元 オリエ, Kimoto Orie), is a Japanese voice actress.

== Biography ==
Kimoto debuted as a voice actress in the 2004 animated film Inuyasha the Movie: Fire on the Mystic Island. Afterwards, she formed the theater unit Tatsumi Musume with Yayoi Otomo, Mai Tanaka, Kazuki Yukimuro, and others. During the audition for the role of Kagura Tennōzu in Speed Grapher, the final candidate was rejected.

Since 2008, Kimoto has focused on the stage, making sporadic appearances. She sometimes performs voice acting.

On June 8, 2010, Kimoto announced her marriage to manga artist Riichiro Inagaki, who is best-known for creating Eyeshield 21 and Dr. Stone.

== Filmography ==
- Futari wa Pretty Cure Splash Star (Saki Hyuuga/Cure Bloom/Cure Bright)
- Power of Hope: PreCure Full Bloom (Saki Hyuuga)
