= Witchy Pretty Cure! The Movie: Wonderous! Cure Mofurun! =

2016 film by Yuta Tanaka

- Theatrical release poster
- Japanese: 映画魔法つかいプリキュア！奇跡の変身！キュアモフルン！
- Revised Hepburn: Eiga Mahōtsukai Purikyua!: Kiseki no Henshin! Kyua Mofurun!
- Directed by: Yuta Tanaka
- Screenplay by: Jin Tanaka
- Based on: Pretty Cure by Izumi Todo
- Produced by: Yū Kaminoki
- Starring: Rie Takahashi; Yui Horie; Saori Hayami; Ayaka Saito; Daisuke Namikawa
- Cinematography: Yoshiyuki Anzai
- Production company: Toei Animation
- Distributed by: Toei Company, Ltd.
- Release date: October 29, 2016
- Running time: 70 minutes
- Country: Japan
- Language: Japanese

Witchy Pretty Cure! The Movie: Wonderous! Cure Mofurun! (Japanese: 映画魔法つかいプリキュア！奇跡の変身！キュアモフルン！, Hepburn: Eiga Mahōtsukai Purikyua! Kiseki no Henshin! Kyua Mofurun!) is a 2016 Japanese animated action fantasy film based on the Pretty Cure franchise created by Izumi Todo, and its thirteenth series, Witchy Pretty Cure. The film is directed by Yuta Tanaka, written by Jin Tanaka, and produced by Toei Animation. The film was released in Japan on October 29, 2016. It is a double feature including a fully CG animated short, titled Cure Miracle and Mofurun's Magic Lesson! (キュアミラクルとモフルンの魔法レッスン！, Kyua Mirakuru to Mofurun no Mahō Ressun!).

== Plot ==
=== Cure Miracle and Mofurun's Magic Lesson! ===
Mirai and Mofurun have a magical lesson using the Miracle Lights, which gets out of hand as they start casting magic on each other.

=== Wonderous! Cure Mofurun! ===
Mirai, Liko, Kotoha, and Mofurun attend a Grand Magic Festival, which takes place once every 100 years to celebrate the return of the Wishing Stone, which can grant a wish to whomever it chooses. The stone awakens and chooses Mofurun, who has no particular wish she wants to grant for herself. Suddenly, the festival is attacked by an evil bear known as Dark Matter, who steals the stone and captures Mofurun, hoping to use her wish to erase all magicians. While trying to escape from Dark Matter, Mofurun comes across a village of bears and befriends a black bear named Kumata, who the other villagers fear for his ability to use magic. When Mofurun attempts to return to her friends, Kumata reveals himself to be Dark Matter and states he will not harm the girls if she stays with him. As Mirai tells Mofurun her wish to always be with her, Mofurun's desire to be with her in return reacts with the Wishing Stone, transforming her into Cure Mofurun. Noticing that Kumata's anger comes from his loneliness, Mofurun sacrifices herself to try and get through to Kumata, who realizes that what he truly wanted was a friend. As Dark Matter's negative energy from Kumata becomes a dark entity, cancelling out everyone's magic and spreading chaos across the magical world, Mirai remains determined not to give up. Spurred on by Mirai's determination, the inhabitants of the magical world, including Kumata, unite their wishes together, resurrecting Mofurun and giving the Cures the power of the Hearful Styles to defeat Dark Matter. As the Wishing Stone disappears, along with Mofurun's powers, Kumata manages to start making friends of his own.

== Voice cast ==
- Rie Takahashi as Mirai Asahina/Cure Miracle
- Yui Horie as Liko Izayoi/Cure Magical
- Saori Hayami as Kotoha Hanami/Cure Felice
- Ayaka Saito as Mofurun/Cure Mofurun
- Yūya Uchida as Principal
- Yoshino Ohtori as Vice principal
- Satomi Arai as Cathy/Magic Crystal
- Makoto Ishii as François
- Kaori Nazuka as Liz
- Toshiharu Sakurai as Isaac
- Aki Kanada as Jun
- Maya Yoshioka as Kei
- Chinami Hashimoto as Emily
- Shota Yamamoto as Yokubaru

=== Film exclusive characters ===
Several bear mascots, including Abenobear (mascot of Abeno Harukas observation deck "Harukas 300"), Arukuma (Nagano Prefecture mascot), Handbaguma's Goo Goo (President of the Japanese Hamburger Association in Shizuoka), Koakkuma and Akkuma (Hokkaido), Koguma (Meitetsu Transportation mascot), Kumamon, Posukuma (Japan Post Service), Pote Kuma-kun (mascot of Chichibu, Saitama), Sukuma (Japan Post Service), and Zonbear (unofficial Otaru mascot), make non-speaking appearances in the "Bear Cheering Party" (クマ応援団, Kuma Ōendan), and also shake the Miracle Light.

- Daisuke Namikawa as:
  - Kumata (クマタ, Kumata), a black bear who wish to help people but flee because they fear him, this makes him bear a vendetta towards people and brainwashed by Dark Matter to take an appearance of adult bear wearing a mask. He captures Mofurun to help her make her wish come true but she escapes. He takes the form of a young bear to manipulate Mofurun until he reveals himself. He attacks the Cures but Mofurun lets herself be defeated to make him snap out of it. Dark Matter come out of his body and he help the Cures to face Dark Matter. After Dark Matter's death, he bid farewell to everyone and stay at Bear Village.
  - Dark Matter (ダークマター, Dāku Matā), the main antagonist of the film. An evil entity who brainwashes Kumata until Kumata strikes Mofurun and force him to reveal his true form. The Cures, with the help of Kumata, enter Dark Matter's body and defeat him with Heartful Rainbow. Once Dark Matter/Kumata realizes what he's done to Mofurun, his magic power turns into Shadow Matter (シャドウマター, Shadou Matā). The giant shadow creates magic circles everywhere in the Magic World from which lightning strikes that cancels magic and turns people into stone statues. When the girls, with the help of everyone's Miracle Light wishes, revive Mofurun and transform back into Cures, the giant shadow focuses on attacking them instead. With the help of the flare dragon, they break into the giant shadow and find an evil magic version of Dark Matter, Shadow Matter inside. After a fierce battle using all their transformations, the Cures use Mofurun's new Heartful Linkle Stone to perform Heartful Rainbow and defeat it.
- Shota Yamamoto as Flare Dragon (フレアドラゴン, Furea Doragon), a flare dragon who performs tricks in the Grand Magic Festival's Circus Balloon. Kotoha is able to communicate with it and together they spew a fireball and turn it into fireworks. When Dark Matter disrupts the festival and abducts both the Wishing Stone and Mofurun, he also turns the Flare Dragon into Shadow Dragon (カゲドラゴン, Kage Doragon) and flies away on it. Later, when the girls are looking for Mofurun, the Shadow Dragon shows up again and attacks them. Being the only one left who can do so, Kotoha transforms into Cure Felice and distracts it while the others go ahead to Dark Matter's lair. When Cure Mofurun is fighting an enraged Dark Matter while Mirai frees Liko, Cure Felice returns together with the Flare Dragon. The others are surprised to see it, but Felice explains how she discovered that the Shadow Dragon was actually the Flare Dragon, possessed by Dark Matter's shadows. She used Pink Tourmaline to get rid it of the shadows. After that, the Flare Dragon helps the Cures fly out of Dark Matter's lair. Later, it helps them break into the giant shadow to battle its core Pure Shadow Matter.

== Production ==
This is the first film appearance of Cure Felice. It was also announced that the Cures' fairy Mofurun will transform into a film-only Cure in the film.

In addition to the movie-exclusive Heartful Style (ハートフルスタイル, Hātofuru Sutairu), the film also features a movie-only Cure, Cure Mofurun (キュアモフルン, Kyua Mofurun). It was reported that due to Mofurun being defined in the original setting as having no gender, she wears kabocha pants in order to give a neutral impression.

It was announced that a computer-generated short film would be screened with the movie, and that AKB48 member Mayu Watanabe would be in charge of both the theme song and the main film's feature song. Watanabe has been a fan of the franchise since elementary school, and would perform the theme songs on karaoke and buy goods at the Pretty Cure shop at Tokyo Station. She said "When I heard the story, I was happy and dreamed about it." Watanabe cosplayed as Cure Miracle in AKB48 Group Unit Single Sōdatsu Janken Taikai in Kobe World Kinen Hall on October 10, 2016. She later made a guest appearance in the 38th episode of the original series. A dance to the Mayu Watanabe song was broadcast in the endings of the 38th and 39th episode of the original series.

The Miracle Light for this movie, Miracle Mofurun Light (ミラクルモフルンライト, Mirakuru Mofurun Raito), was distributed to children, while a sticker set, Glitter Invitation Seal (キラキラ招待状シール, Kirakira Jōtaijō Shīru), was given to 300,000 people nationwide.

=== Music ===
==== Single ====
"Sparkling Vows"

Single by Cure Miracle (Rie Takahashi), Cure Magical (Yui Horie), Cure Felice (Saori Hayami), and Mofurun (Ayaka Saitou)
- B-side: "Two Wishes"
- Released: October 12, 2016
- Genre: J-pop, Anime song
- Length: 18:54
- Label: Marvelous

Sparkling Vows (キラメク誓い, Kirameku Chikai) is an insert song of the anime film Witchy Pretty Cure! The Movie: Wonderous! Cure Mofurun!. The single was released from Marvelous on October 12, 2016. The single topped at #66 in the Oricon Singles Chart on October 24, 2016. The symphonic and serious up-tempo is coupled with a ballad, Two Wishes (ふたつのねがい, Futatsu no Negai).

===== Track listing =====
1. Sparkling Vows (キラメク誓い, Kirameku Chikai) [4:41]
  Sung by: Cure Miracle (Rie Takahashi), Cure Magical (Yui Horie), Cure Felice (Saori Hayami), and Mofurun (Ayaka Saitou)
  Lyrics: Kumiko Aoki
  Work and Arrangement: Hiroshi Takagi
  - Insert song of Witchy Pretty Cure! The Movie: Wonderous! Cure Mofurun!
2. Two Wishes (ふたつのねがい, Futatsu no Negai) [4:48]
  Sung by: Miral Asahina (Takahashi) and Mofurun (Saitou)
  Lyrics and Work: Noriko Fujimoto
  Arrangement: Masayuki Fukutomi
  - Later used as a song in episode 49 of the main series.
3. Sparkling Vows (Instrumental) (キラメク誓い（Instrumental）, Kirameku Chikai (Instrumental)) [4:41]
4. Two Wishes (Instrumental) (ふたつのねがい（Instrumental）, Futatsu no Negai (Instrumental)) [4:43]

==== Soundtrack ====
Film score by Hiroki Takagi
- Released: October 26, 2016
- Recorded: 2016
- Genre: Soundtrack
- Label: Marvelous

The film's original soundtrack was released on October 26, 2016. Hiroshi Takaki recorded the soundtrack. It topped at #271 in the Oricon Albums Chart on November 7.

Track listing
No.	Title	Length
1.	"Cure Miracle and Mofurun's Magic Lesson! (キュアミラクルとモフルンの魔法レッスン！, Kyua Mirakuru to Mofurun no mahō ressun!)"	03:50
2.	"Miracle・Magical・Jewelryle! <Dia> (ミラクル・マジカル・ジュエリーレ！＜ダイヤ＞, Mirakuru majikaru juerīre! <Daiya>)"	01:25
3.	"Dokkin♢Witchy Pretty Cure! (Movie size) (Dokkin◇魔法つかいプリキュア！映画サイズ, Dokkin◇Mahōtsukai purikyua! Eiga saizu)"	01:32
4.	"Great Magic Festival (大魔法フェスティバル, Daimahō Fesutibaru)"	01:12
5.	"The Centennial Festival (100年に一度のお祭り, 100-nen ni ichido no omatsuri)"	02:19
6.	"Wishing Stone (願いの石, Negai no ishi)"	01:08
7.	"Dark Matter Attack (ダークマター急襲, Dākumatā kyūshū)"	02:34
8.	"Mofurun abducted (モフルンがさらわれた, Mofurun ga sarawareta)"	01:20
9.	"Mofurun Great Escape (モフルン大脱走, Mofurun daidassō)"	01:15
10.	"The Right Way To Use Magic (Movie size) (正しい魔法の使い方映画サイズ, Tadashī Mahō no Tsukai Kata eiga saizu)"	01:34
11.	"Three hearts nestling (寄り添う三つの心, Yorisou mittsu no kokoro)"	00:57
12.	"Cookie mofu!! (クッキーモフ!!, Kukkīmofu!!)"	01:33
13.	"Don't bite on the seeds! (タネはかじっちゃダメ！, Tane wa kajitchadame!)"	01:09
14.	"Sunset and cookies (夕陽とクッキー, Yūhi to kukkī)"	01:09
15.	"Two Wishes (Movie size) (ふたつのねがい映画サイズ, Futatsu no negai eiga saizu)"	01:55
16.	"The shocking identity (恐ろしい正体, Osoroshī shōtai)"	01:29
17.	"Desperate pursuit (決死の追撃, Kesshi no tsuigeki)"	01:10
18.	"Liko's friendship (リコの友情, Riko no yūjō)"	01:55
19.	"The thoughts that call about a miracle (想いが呼ぶ奇跡, Omoi ga yobu kiseki)"	02:24
20.	"Brilliant! Cure Mofurun (鮮烈！キュアモフルン, Senretsu! Kyua Mofurun)"	02:34
21.	"Dark Matter strikes back (ダークマターの逆襲, Dākumatā no gyakushū)"	01:35
22.	"A sad Dark Matter (哀しきダークマター, Kanashiki dākumatā)"	01:58
23.	"Kumata's tears (クマタの涙, Kumata no namida)"	01:20
24.	"Magic World Crisis (魔法界の危機, Mahōkai no kiki)"	01:37
25.	"Miraculous Footsteps・Light of Hope (奇跡の足音・願いの光, Kiseki no Ashioto: Negai no hikari)"	03:40
26.	"Revival! Witchy Pretty Cure (復活！魔法つかいプリキュア, Fukkatsu! Mahōtsukai purikyua)"	01:15
27.	"Sparkling Vows (Movie size) (キラメク誓い映画サイズ, Kirameku chikai eiga saizu)"	03:48
28.	"Beyond the dawn (夜明けの向こうに, Yoake no mukō ni)"	00:38
29.	"Magic À La・Thanks! (Movie size) (魔法アラ・ドーモ!映画サイズ, Mahō ara dōmo! Eiga saizu)"	02:03

== Release ==
The film was released in theaters in Japan on October 29, 2016. The film's Blu-ray and DVD was released on March 1, 2017. On March 13 the special-version DVD and regular-version DVD charted at 12 and 30 in the Oricon DVD Chart, while the BR charted at 10 in the Blu-ray Disc Chart.

== Reception ==
31,740 tickets were sold in the first two days of the release date, four times more than the previous film, alongside 139,830 people on 213 screens nationwide, recording a box-office revenue of ¥16,226,200; it was ranked fourth place by Kōgyō Tsūshin. The year-by-year increase hit a record 126% with the movie. Pia ranked the film at 3rd place with a satisfaction level of 92.0. On November 1, the cumulative audience attendance of the Pretty Cure franchise reached 15 million. The final revenue was 670 million yen, a recovery trend compared to the previous year.
