= Go! Princess Pretty Cure =

Japanese anime television series

- Go! Princess PreCure
- Cover of the last DVD disc volume, featuring the main cures, villains, allies, and fairies

Go！プリンセスプリキュア (Gō! Purinsesu PuriKyua)
- Genre: Magical girl
- Created by: Izumi Todo
- Anime television series
- Directed by: Yuta Tanaka
- Produced by: Shigehaki Dohi; Tomoko Takahashi; Hiroaki Shibata; Yū Kaminoki
- Written by: Jin Tanaka
- Music by: Hiroshi Takaki
- Studio: Toei Animation
- Licensed by: Crunchyroll
- Original network: ANN (ABC, TV Asahi)
- Original run: February 1, 2015 – January 31, 2016
- Episodes: 50
- Manga
- Written by: Izumi Todo
- Illustrated by: Futago Kamikita
- Published by: Kodansha
- Magazine: Nakayoshi
- Original run: March 2015 – February 2016
- Volumes: 2
- Video game

Go! Princess PreCure: Sugar Ōkoku to Rokunin no Princess
- Developer: Bandai Namco Entertainment
- Publisher: Bandai Namco Entertainment
- Genre: Puzzle
- Platform: Nintendo 3DS
- Released: July 30, 2015
- Anime film

Go! Princess PreCure The Movie: Go! Go!! Splendid Triple Feature!!!
- Studio: Toei Animation
- Released: October 31, 2015
- Runtime: 70 minutes
- Light novel

Go! Princess PreCure: Refi and the Flowers' Adventure
- Written by: Akino Sakurako
- Published by: Kodansha
- Imprint: Kodansha KK Bunko
- Published: March 15, 2017

Go! Princess Pretty Cure (Go！プリンセスプリキュア, Gō! Purinsesu Purikyua), also known simply as Go! Princess PreCure, is a 2015 Japanese magical girl anime series produced by Toei Animation, and the twelfth installment to Izumi Todo's Pretty Cure metaseries, featuring the tenth generation of Cures. It is directed by Yuta Tanaka and written by Jin Tanaka, with character designs by Yukiko Nakatani.

The series began airing on February 1, 2015, succeeding HappinessCharge PreCure! in its timeslot. The series' main topics are hopes and dreams, with the Cures' overall motifs being princesses, keys, and perfumes. It was then succeeded by Witchy Pretty Cure! on February 7, 2016.

== Story ==
Eight years ago, a young girl named Haruka Haruno dreamed of becoming a Princess like the ones in fairy tales and picture books, but was bullied by her classmates in kindergarten because of it. She later met a boy named Kanata, who gave her a strange charm while having her promise to never give up on her dreams.

Eight years later, now 13 years old, Haruka attends the Noble Academy boarding school while still cherishing her dreams of becoming a princess. One day, she encounters two fairies from the Hope Kingdom: Pafu and Aroma, who are being pursued by a strange man named Close. The fairies tell her that he works for Dys Dark, an organization led by a witch named Dyspear who seeks to bring despair to the world by locking dreams away in the Gate of Despair.

The charm she had turns out to be a Dress Up Key, which along with the Princess Perfume the fairies give her, allows her to become one of Hope Kingdom's chosen warriors: Cure Flora, a Pretty Cure to oppose Dys Dark. Later joined by Minami Kaido, Kirara Amanogawa and Towa Akagi as Cure Mermaid, Cure Twinkle, and Cure Scarlet, Haruka forms the Princess Pretty Cure Team to collect the Dress Up Keys needed to open the Gate of Dreams while protecting people's dreams from Dys Dark's forces.

== Characters ==
=== Pretty Cures ===
The Princess Pretty Cures, who represent the Hope Kingdom, are composed of four warriors: Cure Flora, Cure Mermaid, Cure Twinkle and Cure Scarlet. Chosen by their Dress Up Keys (ドレスアップキー, Doresuappukī), their mission is to find the remaining Keys while protecting the Gate of Dreams from Dys Dark. All four of them use a magical transformation item called a Princess Perfume (プリンセスパフューム, Purinsesu Pafuyūmu) which they activate with a Dress Up Key by saying "Pretty Cure Princess Engage!" (プリキュア・プリンセスエンゲージ!, PuriKyua Purinsesu Engēji!). Each also has alternate forms called Mode Elegant (モードエレガント, Mōdo Ereganto), in which they use their main attacks. They later use the "Crystal Princess Rod" (クリスタルプリンセスロッド, Kurisutaru Purinsesu Roddo) to perform more powerful attacks and enter a new Mode Elegant form using the Elegant Keys and Miracle Keys. Unlike the other Cures, Cure Scarlet instead uses the Scarlet Violin (スカーレットバイオリン, Sukāretto Baiorin) as her main weapon to perform attacks. They later gain more powerful attacks by using the Princess Palace (プリンセスパレス, Purinsesu Paresu) along with the Premium Dress Up Keys and Royal Dress Up Keys to access new Mode Elegant forms.

They introduce themselves as "Strongly! Gently! Beautifully! Go! Princess Pretty Cure!" (つよく! やさしく! 美しく! Go！プリンセスプリキュア!, Tsuyoku! Yasashiku! Utsukushiku! Go! Purinsesu Purikyua!) and their catchphrase is "You've locked a dream away in a frigid cage...I intend to retrieve it! Have you prepared yourself?" (つめたい檻に閉ざされた夢、返していただきますわ! お覚悟は、よろしくて?, Tsumetai Ori ni Tozasareta Yume, Kaeshite Itadakimasu wa! O Kakugo wa, Yoroshikute?) Cure Scarlet's catchphrase is "You've locked a dream away in a frigid cage...I intend to retrieve it! Prepare yourself for what's to come!" (つめたい檻に閉ざされた夢、返していただきますわ! さあ、お覚悟決めなさい!, Tsumetai Ori ni Tozasareta Yume, Kaeshite Itadakimasu wa! Saa, O Kakugo Kimenasai!)

Haruka Haruno (春野 はるか, Haruno Haruka) / Cure Flora (キュアフローラ, Kyua Furōra)
Voiced by: Yū Shimamura
The main protagonist. Haruka is an energetic and cheerful 13-year-old girl and a first-year student at Noble Academy. She likes stories about princesses and dreams of becoming one, and often refers to things as being "in full bloom" (満開, mankai). When she was young, she was often bullied about her dream of becoming a princess until she met Kanata, who gave her a Dress Up Key and encouraged her to follow her dream. In the present day, she is still determined to make her dreams come true. In the epilogue, she is shown as an adult with a crystal replica of her Dress Up Key. Her Dress Up Keys are Flora, Rose, Lily, Sakura (Cherry Blossom), Pumpkin and Royal.
As Cure Flora, she is known as the Princess of Flowers and introduces herself as "The princess of blossoming flowers! Cure Flora!" (咲きほこる花のプリンセス!キュアフローラ!, Sakihokoru Hana no Purinsesu! Kyua Furōra!). Her theme color is pink.

Minami Kaido (海藤 みなみ, Kaidō Minami) / Cure Mermaid (キュアマーメイド, Kyua Māmeido)
Voiced by: Masumi Asano
Minami is a 14-year-old girl and a second-year student at Noble Academy. She is known as the "Academy Princess" and is the president of Noble Academy's student council, and is admired by all of the students. Despite appearing to have a solitary appearance and a strict demeanor, she is calm and caring and cares for others like an older sister. She wishes to become useful and helpful to others. She is also a member of Noble Academy's ballet club, and has been afraid of ghosts since she was young. In episode 44, she decides that her dream is to become a marine veterinarian like Asuka, which she is shown to have fulfilled in the epilogue. She is also shown to have a crystal replica of her Dress Up Key. Her Dress Up Keys are Mermaid, Ice, Bubble, Sango (Coral) and Pumpkin.
As Cure Mermaid, she is known as the Princess of the Sea and introduces herself as "The princess of crystal clear oceans! Cure Mermaid!" (澄みわたる海のプリンセス!キュアマーメイド!, Sumiwataru Umi no Purinsesu! Kyua Māmeido!). Her theme color is blue.

Kirara Amanogawa (天ノ川 きらら, Amanogawa Kirara) / Cure Twinkle (キュアトゥインクル, Kyua Tuinkuru)
Voiced by: Hibiku Yamamura
Kirara is a 13-year-old girl (12 in debut) and a freshman at Noble Academy as well as Haruka's classmate. She is a fashionable girl who goes at her own pace, and is also a famous junior model who is often busy with appearing in magazines and fashion shows. She pushes forward with her dream of becoming a top model who shines like the stars. Despite becoming a Pretty Cure, she initially refused to join the team because of her busy schedule. However, she eventually joins the team after turning down the audition and understanding that she mustn't give up on her dream. In the epilogue, she is shown to have traveled to France and become a famous model. She is also shown to have a crystal replica of her Dress Up Key. Her Dress Up Keys are Twinkle, Luna, Shooting Star, Ginga (Galaxy) and Pumpkin.
As Cure Twinkle, she is known as the Princess of the Stars and introduces herself as "The princess of sparkling stars! Cure Twinkle!" (きらめく星のプリンセス!キュアトゥインクル!, Kirameku Hoshi no Purinsesu! Kyua Tuinkuru!). Her theme color is yellow.

Towa Akagi (紅城 トワ, Akagi Towa) / Twilight (トワイライト, Towairaito) / Cure Scarlet (キュアスカーレット, Kyua Sukāretto)
Voiced by: Miyuki Sawashiro
Her full name is Princess Hope Delight Towa (プリンセス・ホープ・ディライト・トワ, Purinsesu Hōpu Diraito Towa). She is Kanata's 13-year-old younger sister and the princess of Hope Kingdom, who has a strong admiration for her brother. When she was young, Dyspear took advantage of her desire to become a Grand Princess to lure her into the Forest of Despair, where she had her memories removed and became known as Dyspear's daughter, Twilight. The disappearance of its princess caused Hope Kingdom to fall into despair, allowing Dyspear to revive and take over the kingdom. While serving as Dys Dark's second-in-command, Twilight was merciless and cold-hearted, often regarding the Cures as "fake princesses". She used black Dress Up Keys to power up the other generals, allowing them to summon more powerful Zetsuborgs. She eventually comes across the fourth Princess Perfume, which Dyspear uses with another Black Key to transform Twilight into the Pretty Cure-like Black Princess (ブラックプリンセス, Burakku Purinsesu). However, through the Cures' and Kanata's efforts, she is purified and returned to her original form as Towa. Towa later becomes the fourth Princess Pretty Cure, Cure Scarlet. In the final episode, she returns to Hope Kingdom along with Kanata, Pafu, and Aroma, and is shown in the epilogue to have succeeded her mother as the current queen of Hope Kingdom. She is also shown to have a crystal replica of her Dress Up Key. Her Dress Up Keys are Scarlet, Hanabi (Fireworks), Phoenix, Sun and Pumpkin.
As Cure Scarlet, she is known as the Princess of the Flame of Hope and introduces herself as "Princess of the crimson flames! Cure Scarlet!" (深紅の炎のプリンセス!キュアスカーレット!, Shinku no Honō no Purinsesu! Kyua Sukāretto!). Her theme color is red.

Chieri (チエリ)
Voiced by: Saki Fujita
The original Cure Flora before Haruka, who succeeded her as the current Cure Flora.

Yura (ユラ)
Voiced by: Satsuki Yukino
The original Cure Mermaid before Minami, who succeeded her as the current Cure Mermaid.

Sei (セイ)
Voiced by: Kaori Shimizu
The original Cure Twinkle before Kirara, who succeeded her as the current Cure Twinkle.

=== Hope Kingdom ===
Prince Kanata (カナタ王子, Kanata Ōji)
Voiced by: Shinnosuke Tachibana
His full name is Prince Hope Grand Kanata (プリンス・ホープ・グランド・カナタ, Purinsu Hōpu Gurando Kanata). Kanata is the crown prince of the Hope Kingdom and has a gentle, kind, and brave heart. When Dyspear attacked his homeland, he entrusted the Princess Perfumes to Pafu and Aroma to search for the Pretty Cures while he protected the Dress Up Keys. However, he was forced to send the Dress Up Keys to Yumegahama before fleeing into the forest as Dys Dark took over the palace, giving the last Dress Up Key to a young Haruka. Towa is later revealed to be his sister. In episode 21, he holds off Dyspear's attack to allow the Cures and Towa to return to Earth, but his fate is unknown. He is shown to be alive when the cats find his brooch at the end of episode 33 and the Cures learn he is somewhere on Earth. In episode 35, it is revealed that Nishikido found him washed up on the beach after Dyspear's attack, and that he has lost his powers and memories. In episode 39, he regains his memories of Hope Kingdom, but inadvertently causes Haruka to have a mental breakdown by telling her she cannot become a princess. In the final episode, he returns to Hope Kingdom along with Towa, Pafu, and Aroma.

Hope Kingdom King & Hope Kingdom Queen (ホープキングダム王、ホープキングダム王妃, Hōpu Kingudamu Ou, Hōpu Kingudamu Ouhi)
Voiced by: Tokuyoshi Kawashima (Hope King) & Yuri Amano (Hope Queen)
Towa and Kanata's parents and the rulers of the Hope Kingdom, who were trapped within the Gate of Desperation when Dys Dark invaded their homeland. After Close's departure, they are freed and reunite with their children.

Wish (ウィッシュ, Uisshu)
Kanata's loyal steed.

The Royal Fairies (ロイヤルフェアリー, Roiyaru Fearī) are a group of magical animals who serve the Prince of the Hope Kingdom, entrusted to find the Pretty Cures and educate them to be a real Princess. Their appearance is based on the animal mascots from various fairy tales.

Pafu (パフ)
Voiced by: Nao Tōyama
A pink poodle-like fairy from the Hope Kingdom who is Aroma's younger sister, she and her brother came to search for the Pretty Cures. Pafu serves as the maid of the Hope Kingdom. She is carefree, spoiled, and talkative. She is also fashionable and happy to try out different hairstyles and clothes. As the series progresses, she becomes a full-fledged maid after protecting a sick Towa from Dys Dark. She often ends her sentences with "pafu". Her name is derived from powder puffs, which are used for the application of face powder. Her human form resembles a short girl with pink hair who wears a pink maid dress. In the final episode, she returns to Hope Kingdom along with Kanata, Towa, and Aroma.

Aroma (アロマ)
Voiced by: Shiho Kokido
A purple parakeet-like fairy from the Hope Kingdom and is Pafu's older brother, Aroma serves as the butler of the Hope Kingdom. He is cheerful and reliable. Despite sometimes nagging the girls in his efforts to help them become true princesses, he is caring and affectionate, especially towards Pafu. Like his sister, he becomes a full-fledged butler after protecting a sick Towa from Dys Dark. He often ends his sentences with "roma". His name is derived from aroma, meaning fragrant. His human form resembles a teenage boy with purple hair who wears a butler outfit. In the final episode, he returns to Hope Kingdom along with Kanata, Towa, and Pafu.

Miss Shamour (ミス・シャムール, Misu Shamūru)
Voiced by: Mayumi Shintani
A Siamese cat-like fairy from Hope Kingdom who emerges from the Lesson Pad to teach the Cures during Princess Lessons and acts as their mentor. She has the ability to transform into a human form at will, who resembles a woman with black hair worn in twintails. Her name is derived from Chamois leather, a type of material used to make leather bags.

=== Dys Dark ===
Dys Dark (ディスダーク, Disu Dāku) are the main antagonists of the series, who aim to trap people's dreams into the Gate of Despair and spread despair and chaos across the world. After taking over Hope Kingdom, Dys Dark's forces are dispatched to Yumegahama to find the Dress Up Keys. While Dyspear recovers in the Forest of Despair, she leaves Lock in charge so he and Shut can fuel the gauges to gather people's despair and speed up her restoration. However, after Lock's act of treason and purification, Dys Dark loses Hope Kingdom's castle, with a revived Dyspear creating a new palace from thorns. Dys is a shortened alternate spelling of despair. All the generals survive after Dyspear's defeat, with Close departing after fighting Cure Flora and Shut and Lock starting a new life in Yumegahama.

==== Leaders ====
Dyspear (ディスピア, Disupia)
Voiced by: Yoshiko Sakakibara
The main antagonist of the series and the leader of Dys Dark, whose name is derived from the word "despair". A ruthless and cunning sorceress born from the despair of people whose dreams were not realized, she hates dreams and aims to spread despair and chaos across the world with the Dress Up Keys' power. She reawakened after luring Towa into the Forest of Despair by promising to make her dream of becoming a Grand Princess come true, which caused Hope Kingdom to fall into despair. She erased Towa's memories and manipulated her into becoming Twilight, Dys Dark's princess who was believed to be her daughter. After her battle with Towa, she returns to the Forest of Despair to recover and gives Lock a gauge to fill up with energy from despair so she can return upon regaining her full strength. Close uses the gauge that Lock collected to revive her and allow her to resume her leadership. After Hope Kingdom is restored, she invades Earth and attacks Noble Academy. After Lock's defeat, Dyspear absorbs Close to assume her true form and easily overpowers the Cures, but they achieve Grand Princess form to purify and defeat her.

==== Generals ====
Close, Shut and Lock serve as Dyspear's elite subordinates and form a group called the Three Musketeers (三銃士, Sanjūshi). The generals' names are derived from words meaning to lock away (Close, Shut, and Lock) and from words meaning to halt something (Stop & Freeze). They have the power to trap people's dreams in the Gate of Despair to create Zetsuborgs, whose appearance varies depending on which general summoned them. Twilight can use her Dress Up Keys on them to increase their power and allow them to summon more powerful Zetsuborgs. They can also assume a monstrous form when battling the Cures in the series' latter half.

Close (クローズ, Kurōzu)
Voiced by: Mitsuaki Madono
The first member of Dys Dark's Three Musketeers and the secondary antagonist of the series. A short-tempered, strict, straight-forward, and stubborn man who disregards people's feelings. He wears a lock around his neck and wears a purple outfit resembling that of a punk rocker. He traps people's dreams by saying, "Close Your Dream!" (クローズ・ユア・ドリーム！, Kurōzu Yua Dorīmu!). After failing one time too many, Close is given a final chance by Dyspear to eliminate the Pretty Cures. He takes them and Yui to his Cage of Despair dimension and assumes a monstrous crow-like form to fight them, overwhelming them to the brink of despair. But with Yui giving the Cures hope, they defeat Close using Trinity Lumiere. However, Close survived, returning to gather despair energy from the defeated Lock and use it to revive Dyspear and create a new palace for their group. During the final battle, he allows Dyspear to absorb him to give her the power to battle the Cures. He survives his leader's death and assumes a new form through her residual powers to fight Cure Flora. However, he is defeated and takes his leave while starting to understand that dreams and despair coexist.

Shut (シャット, Shatto)
Voiced by: Satoshi Hino
The second member of Dys Dark's Three Musketeers. A narcissistic, pompous and aristocratic man who adores anything as beautiful as himself and also shows admiration towards Twilight. He wears a dark blue suit and a white hat with a black rose and a blue feather as decoration. He also holds a black rose in his hand. He traps people's dreams by saying, "Shut Your Dream!" (シャット・ユア・ドリーム！, Shatto Yua Dorīmu!). He ends his sentences with "nomi". In episode 46, he battles the Cures one last time after their previous battle, assuming a monstrous lynx-like form to battle then before being defeated. Shamour gives him the scarf before he leaves after understanding the true meaning of beauty. During the final battle, he assists the Cures in battling Close and Lock and confronts Lock about his true self, allowing the Cures to purify him. He, along with Noble Academy's students and Kuroro, aid the Cures in battling Dyspear. Following Close's departure, he and Lock start a new life in Yumegahama.

Kuroro (クロロ) / Lock (ロック, Rokku)
Voiced by: Yuki Kaida
A shy calico cat-like fairy from the Hope Kingdom who is one of the Royal Fairies and often ends his sentences with "roro". As revealed in episode 40, after Hope Kingdom fell, Kuroro fell into despair and transformed into the child-like Lock after being brainwashed by a sentient coat. As Lock, he is cool, calm and intelligent, and wears a hooded jacket with a demon's face and wings that cover his eyes. Despite being laid-back and playing video games in his spare time, Lock becomes the top member of Dys Dark's Three Musketeers. He traps peoples' dreams by saying, "Lock Your Dream!" (ロック・ユア・ドリーム!, Rokku Yua Dorīmu!). Later, a weakened Dyspear retreats into the Forest of Despair to recover from her fight against Cure Scarlet and leaves Lock in charge of Dys Dark, tasking him with gathering despair energy to heal her. But Lock uses some of the acquired energy to assume an adult-like form before stealing the Cures' Dress Up Keys and revealing his intention to take over Dys Dark. He uses the gathered despair energy to turn Hope Kingdom's palace into a giant Zetsuborg. The Cures retrieve their keys and battle against him, but he transforms into a giant toad-like dragon form to attack them. Despite this, they manage to purify him with Eclat Espoir, and he reverts to Kuroro while ending up in a coma. Upon awakening later, he resolves to help the Cures so he can return to his homeland. During the final battle, Close revives Lock and overpowers the Cures with the despair from Noble Academy's students. After they are released from the Cage of Despair, he is weakened and suffering under Dyspear's control, causing Shut to persuade him to remember his old self before the Cures purify him. Kuroro becomes Lock again and aids the Cures against Dyspear. Following Close's departure, he becomes a fairy teacher while Lock and Shut start a new life in Yumegahama.

Stop (ストップ, Sutoppu) & Freeze (フリーズ, Furīzu)
Voiced by: Shiori Izawa (Stop) & Miyako Itō (Freeze)
Twin Dys Dark generals that serve as Close's attendants, created from seeds that he planted. The two resemble robots with faces covered by masks with animal ears: Stop has rabbit ears and Freeze has mouse ears. They trap people's dreams by saying "Stop, Freeze Your Dream!" (ストップ、フリーズ・ユア・ドリーム！, Sutoppu, Furīzu Yua Dorīmu!). During the final battle, they assume their true vine-like forms to support Dyspear. After Dyspear's destruction, Stop and Freeze assume the forms of armored serpents to battle Cure Flora before leaving with Close.

Zetsuborg (ゼツボーグ, Zetsubōgu)
Voiced by: Takayuki Nakatsukasa
The monsters of the series, who resemble locks and are created when the generals trap people's dreams within the Gate of Despair and turn their dream into a nightmare, which forms the core of a Zetsuborg's being. Their names are a portmanteau of "zetsubō" (絶望, "despair") and "cyborg". Each of the generals use their own names when they trap the victim's dream. Twilight can use the generals' locks to increase the power of the Zetsuborgs; this version has a red lock and a light purple eye. After Lock and Shut power up, they summon Zetsuborgs which have a lock with red horns on it, a glowing yellow eye, and red horns. Using a horn-like lock, the generals create more powerful Zetsuborgs to gather despair energy and restore Dyspear's strength. The Zetsuborgs that Stop & Freeze summon have two locks attached to each other, each with a glowing green eye. Dyspear's Zetsuborgs are called Metsuborgs (メツボルグ, Metsuborugu) and can be created without trapping people's dreams. They have a lock based on her headdress. When Zetsuborgs and Metsuborgs are defeated, they say Dreaming (ドリーミング, Dorīmingu); if defeated by Cure Scarlet, they say Burning (ーバーニング, Bāningu).

=== Other characters ===
==== Noble Academy ====
Unlike the rest of the series, Noble Academy is a boarding school with dormitories. Its students greet others by saying "Have a Good Day (ごきげんよう, Gokigen'yō)".

Yui Nanase (七瀬 ゆい, Nanase Yui)
Voiced by: Haruka Yoshimura
Haruka's roommate and friend at Noble Academy who dreams of becoming a children's book author. In episode 10, she discovers Haruka and her group's identities as Pretty Cures and helps them out anyway she can. She often takes care of civilians during Dys Dark's attacks. In the epilogue, she publishes a story based on the Cures' experiences.

Reiko Kisaragi (如月 れいこ, Kisaragi Reiko)
Voiced by: Risa Mizuno
The dorm supervisor of Noble Academy. She was initially afraid of dogs, causing her to dislike Pafu, but became fond of her when she protected her from a Zetsuborg. Her dream is to be a judge.

Seira Azuma (東 せいら, Azuma Seira)
Voiced by: Yui Hashimoto
The vice president of Noble Academy's student council, whose dream is to be a baseball player.

Ayaka Nishimine (西峰 あやか, Nishimine Ayaka)
Voiced by: Ayano Niina
The secretary of Noble Academy's student council, whose dream is to be a dancer.

Shirogane (白金さん, Shirogane-san)
Voiced by: Keiko Aki
The head of the women's dormitory and Noble Academy's matron. She often appears abruptly and at the perfect moments, doing various duties around the academy. Rumors say that she is more than one person.

Yuki Aihara (藍原 ゆうき, Aihara Yūki)
Voiced by: Atsushi Abe, Yūko Gibu (young)
Haruka's classmate, who often picked on her when they were in kindergarten. He later becomes a member of the tennis club and reunites with Haruka.

Shu Imagawa (今川 シュウ, Imagawa Shū)
Voiced by: Atsushi Tamaru
The second vice president of Noble Academy's student council and the leader of the men's dormitory.

Naoto Koshiba (古芝 ナオト, Koshiba Naoto)
Voiced by: Taishi Murata
The second secretary of Noble Academy's student council.

Yume Mochizuki (望月 ゆめ, Mochizuki Yume)
Voiced by: Toshiko Sawada
The friendly and polite headmistress of Noble Academy and a former famous children's author. She wrote "Princess of Flowers", the book that inspired Haruka's dream.

Hanae Komori (小森 はなえ, Komori Hanae)
Voiced by: Haruka Chisuga
Haruka's classmate and a member of Noble Academy's flower arrangement club.

Sayaka Kano (狩野 さやか, Kanō Sayaka) / Mai Kurita (栗田 まい, Kurita Mai) / Noriko Komaki (小巻 のりこ, Komaki Noriko)
Voiced by: Nao Tōuyama (Sayaka Kano), Yui Hashimoto (Mai Kurita), Haruka Yoshimura (Noriko)
Yuki Aihara's fanclub, who always supports Yuki in his matches. They are jealous of Haruka when she and Yuki interact with each other.

Kimimaro Ijuin (伊集院 キミマロ, Ijūin Kimimaro)
Voiced by: Masahito Yabe
Minami's fiance and childhood friend. In the finale, he enrolls in Noble Academy.

Kenta Hirano (平野 ケンタ, Hirano Kenta)
Voiced by: Yūsuke Kobayashi
Haruka and Yui's classmate, who played Romeo in the drama show.

Riko Furuya (古屋 りこ, Furuya Riko)
Voiced by: Kana Ueda
Haruka and Yui's classmate, who is the director of Noble Academy's drama club and dreams of becoming a movie director.

Sumire Zama (座間 すみれ, Zama Sumire)
Voiced by: Mari Yoko
Haruka's homeroom teacher at Noble Academy.

==== Family members ====
Ibuki Haruno (春野 いぶき, Haruno Ibuki)
Voiced by: Yasunori Matsumoto
Haruka's father. He is a baker, and impressed many of Haruka's friends with his baked goods on his visit to the school.

Moe Haruno (春野 もえ, Haruno Moe)
Voiced by: Yūko Gibu
Haruka's mother, who owns a traditional sweets shop called Haruya.

Momoka Haruno (春野 ももか, Haruno Momoka)
Voiced by: Ayu Matsura
Haruka's younger sister. A first-grade student who acted impolite towards people during her school visit, but was actually acting out because she missed her older sister.

Tsukasa Kaido (海藤つかさ, Kaidō Tsukasa)
Voiced by: Hiroyuki Kinoshita
Minami’s father.

Masumi Kaido (海藤ますみ, Kaidō Masumi)
Voiced by: Emi Shinohara
Minami's mother.

Wataru Kaido (海藤わたる, Kaidō Wataru)
Voiced by: Kazuyuki Okitsu
Minami's older brother, who owns and manages a seaside resort. He is the heir to the Kaido family and graduated from Noble Academy before Minami enrolled. He dreams of interacting with others through the sea.

Stella Amanogawa (天ノ川 ステラ, Amanogawa Sutera)
Voiced by: Sayaka Ohara
Kirara's mother. A supermodel who inspired her daughter to be like her.

Ken Takamagahara (高天原 健, Takamagahara Ken)
Kirara's father. A famous movie actor who has been in Hollywood films.

==== Others ====
Baurollo Bauanne (ボロロ・ボワンヌ, Bororo Bowan'nu)
Voiced by: Takumi Yamazaki
A famous and somewhat eccentric fashion designer.

Ranko Ichijou (一条らんこ, Ichijō Ranko)
Voiced by: Sayuri Yahagi
A budding starlet with dreams of becoming a TV star, and the occasional rival of her fellow idol Kirara. Despite her youthful appearance, Ranko is a third-year at Noble Academy.

Kyoko Tachi (舘響子, Tachi Kyōko)
Voiced by: Mayumi Sako
Kirara's president and the manager of a modeling agency.

Nishikido (錦戸さん, Nishikido-san)
Voiced by: Osamu Saka
Minami's violin instructor, who also works as a violin repair man. He has built many violins, and gifted Haruka one.

Oikawa (オイカワ)
Voiced by: Hiroshi Naka
An old butler who shows Aroma that what's important for a butler is to consider his master's feelings.

Tina (ティナ)
Voiced by: Satomi Kōrogi
A wild dolphin who saved Minami several years ago. In episode 16, she also saved her from the Zetsuborg's attack.

Asuka Kitakaze (北風 あすか, Kitakaze Asuka)
Voiced by: Maaya Sakamoto
A famous marine biologist and veterinarian.

Karin Akeboshi (明星 かりん, Akeboshi Karin)
Voiced by: Mayuki Makiguchi
A model who befriends Kirara and serves as her assistant.

=== Movie characters ===
Princess Refi (レフィ姫, Refi Hime)
Voiced by: Hinata Uegaki
The princess of the Night Kingdom.

Refi's Mother (レフィの母, Refi no Haha)
Voiced by: Maaya Sakamoto
The ruler of the Night Kingdom.

Princess Pumplulu (パンプルル姫, Panpururu Hime)
Voiced by: Kana Hanazawa
The princess of the Pumpkin Kingdom.

Warp (ウォープ, U~ōpu)
Voiced by: Junichi Suwabe
One of the two main antagonists of the film. A Dys Dark general who carries a white book that captures objects. He locks Pumpululu away and manipulates her parents to make them forget about her. He plans to capture the Cures as part of his collection; after revealing his intentions, he assumes a salamander-like form and overpowers the Cures. With Pumpululu's encouragement, they manage to defeat him with Halloween Eclair.

Night Pumpkin (ナイトパンプキン, Naito Panpukin)
Voiced by: Ryūsei Nakao
One of the two main antagonists of the film. He invaded Night Kingdom to turn the sky into night. The Cures distract him to allow Refi to place the Miracle Light atop the palace and banish him from the Night Kingdom.

Pumpkin Kingdom's King & Queen (王様、お妃様, Ou-sama, Okisaki-sama)
Voiced by: Chō (King) & Kaori Yamagata (Queen)
The rulers of Pumpkin Kingdom and Pumplulu's parents.

Pan (パン), Puu (プウ) and Kin (キン)
Voiced by: Misaki Kuno (Pan), Tomoko Kaneda (Puu) & Tomo Muranaka (Kin)
Pumpkin Kingdom's fairies.

== Production ==
The series was first trademarked by Toei on October 7, 2014, by the Japan Patent Office to be used in a variety of goods and merchandise and became public later that month. On November 28, 2014, the series's official teaser site opened, revealing its release date. On December 16, the Pretty Cure Store in Osaka, Japan teased the character designs of the main heroines, which were revealed on December 26, 2014. The names of the main Cures were revealed in the event to be Cure Flora, Cure Mermaid and Cure Twinkle, and other official information was revealed the event.

The official website of the anime was also updated with information about the cast. The dormitory setting of the series is a first in the Pretty Cure franchise, depicting the excitement of dorm life, coming of age while living with friends, and the anticipation and anxiety of a new life among roommates, separated from family.

To promote the anime, trailers were shown during the final four episodes of HappinessCharge PreCure!, featuring the transformation scenes of the main Cures. Cure Flora appeared at the end of the last episode along with Cure Lovely to do a baton touch.

== Media ==
=== Anime ===
Go! Princess PreCure began airing on all ANN television stations on February 1, 2015, succeeding HappinessCharge PreCure! in its timeslot along with the Broadcasting System of San-in airing on February 7, 2015. Crunchyroll streamed the series in select territories on June 30, 2024.

==== Films ====
The main characters appeared in the movie Pretty Cure All Stars: Spring Carnival♪, released on March 14, 2015. A three-part feature film, Go! Princess Precure the Movie: Go! Go!! Splendid Triple Feature!!! (映画 Go!プリンセスプリキュア Go! Go!! 豪華3本立て!!!, Eiga Gō! Purinsesu Purikyua: Gō! Gō!! Gōka San-bon Date!!!), was released on October 31, 2015. The film consists of a cel-animated short, titled The Pumpkin Kingdom's Treasure (パンプキン王国のたからもの, Panpukin Ōkoku no Takaramono), and two fully CG animated shorts, titled Precure and Refi's Wonder Night! (プリキュアとレフィのワンダーナイト！, Purikyua to Refi no Wandā Naito!) and Cure Flora and the Mischievous Mirror (キュアフローラといたずらかがみ, Kyua Furōra to Itazura Kagami) respectively. The film's theme song is titled "Kira Kira" by Every Little Thing while the ending theme is Dreams are the Path to the Future.

Pretty Cure All Stars: Singing with Everyone♪ Miraculous Magic! (映画 プリキュアオールスターズ: みんなで歌う♪奇跡の魔法!, Eiga Purikyua Ōru Sutāzu: Minna de Utau♪ Kiseki no Mahō!), was released on March 19, 2016.

Pretty Cure Dream Stars! (映画プリキュアドリームスターズ！, Eiga Purikyua Dorīmu Sutāzu!), was released on March 18, 2017.

=== Music ===
The opening theme is titled Miracle Go! Princess PreCure by Karin Isobe while the first ending is titled Dreaming ☆ Princess PreCure (1-25) and the second ending is Dreams are the Path to the Future (26–50) by Rie Kitagawa. The opening theme is composed by Ryo Watanabe, the first ending theme is by Sayaka Yamamoto, the second ending theme is by Rei Ishizuka, and the background music is by Hiroshi Takaki, who previously composed the music for DokiDoki! PreCure and HappinessCharge PreCure!. The single was released on March 5, 2015, by Marvelous! featuring the theme songs. The first official soundtrack of the series, titled Precure Sound Engage!! was released on May 27, 2015, along with the first vocal album on July 15, 2015, with the title Strongly, Gently, Beautifully. The single for the second ending theme was released on October 7, 2015. The second vocal album was released on November 11, 2015, with the title For My Dream along with the movie's official soundtrack. A second official soundtrack was released on November 18, 2015, with the title Precure Sound Blaze!!. On January 13, 2016, a vocal best album was released.

=== Manga ===
Like other series before it, a manga adaptation by Futago Kamikita began serialization in Kodansha's Nakayoshi magazine from its March 2015 issue. The first Tankōbon volume was released on August 6, 2015, and the second was released on February 5, 2016.

=== Video game ===
A video game titled Go! Princess PreCure: Sugar Ōkoku to Rokunin no Princess (Go! プリンセスプリキュア シュガー王国と6人のプリンセス, Go! Princess PreCure: The Sugar Kingdom and the Six Princesses) was released by Bandai Namco Entertainment for the Nintendo 3DS on July 30, 2015.

=== Merchandise ===
Merchandise for the series was released by Bandai during its run, including watches, bags, transformation items and more.

Preceded by HappinessCharge PreCure!	Go! Princess PreCure; 2015-2016	Succeeded by Witchy PreCure!
