= Pretty Cure =

Japanese magical girl anime metaseries

Pretty Cure Series
- The twentieth anniversary logo for the Pretty Cure franchise
- Created by: Izumi Todo, Toei Animation
- Original work: Pretty Cure
- Owner: Toei Animation
- Years: 2004–present

Films and television
- Television series: See below

Theatrical presentations
- Play: Precure Kids
- Musical: See below

Games
- Video game: See below

Miscellaneous
- Toys: S.H. Figuarts, dolls, bracelets

Official website
- anime-precure.com

The Pretty Cure Series (プリキュアシリーズ, Purikyua Shirīzu; also titled Precure Series or PreCure Series) is a Japanese tokusatsu heroine, magical girl anime franchise created by Izumi Todo and produced by Toei Animation. Each series revolves around a group of magical girls known as Pretty Cures who battle against evil forces. Starting in February 2004 with Pretty Cure, the franchise has seen many anime series, spanning over 1000 episodes to date, as well as spawning movies, manga, toys, and video games. Its most recent iteration, Star Detective Precure!, began airing in February 2026 as part of TV Asahi's Sunday morning children's television block. As of December 2022, three series have received English adaptations, although many others have received English subtitle versions.

== Overview ==
Each series focuses on a group of teenage girls who are granted special items that allow them to transform into legendary warriors known as the Pretty Cure. With the assistance of creatures known as fairies, the Pretty Cure use their magical powers and enhanced strength to fight against evil forces who create monsters to bring misery to the Earth. As the series progresses and stronger enemies appear, the Cures gain new magical items, new abilities, and sometimes new allies to help them in their fight against evil.

== Production ==
There are currently twenty-three anime television series in the franchise, two of which are direct sequels to their previous series. To date, three of the series have received English adaptations. Pretty Cure was dubbed into English by Ocean Productions and aired in Canada under the name Pretty Cure. Smile PreCure! and DokiDoki! PreCure were adapted by Saban Brands and released on Netflix under the names Glitter Force and Glitter Force Doki Doki, respectively. The series, Kirakira Pretty Cure a la Mode, Healin' Good Pretty Cure and Tropical-Rouge! Pretty Cure, began streaming in Crunchyroll on their respective territories. Each series has received a manga adaptation illustrated by Futago Kamikita, which is published in Kodansha's Nakayoshi shoujo magazine alongside the anime. Starting with Fresh PreCure!, each ending movie featured a dance choreography by each series' Pretty Cure members.

As of 2020, Toei Animation Inc. and Toei Animation Europe owns the international rights to the franchise while both the dubs of Smile and DokiDoki alongside the Glitter Force brand is currently owned by Hasbro.

=== Main series ===
No.	Title	Generation	Run	No. of Episodes	Series director	Ref(s)
1	Pretty Cure	1st	2004–2005	49	Daisuke Nishio	
2	Pretty Cure Max Heart	1st	2005–2006	47	Daisuke Nishio	
3	PreCure Splash Star	2nd	2006–2007	49	Toshiaki Komura	
4	Yes! PreCure 5	3rd	2007–2008	49	Toshiaki Komura	
5	Yes! PreCure 5 GoGo!	3rd	2008–2009	48	Toshiaki Komura	
6	Fresh PreCure!	4th	2009–2010	50	Junji Shimizu, Akifumi Zako	
7	Heart Catch PreCure	5th	2010–2011	49	Tatsuya Nagamine	
8	Suite PreCure	6th	2011–2012	48	Munehisa Sakai	
9	Smile PreCure!	7th	2012–2013	48	Takashi Otsuka	
10	DokiDoki! PreCure	8th	2013–2014	49	Go Koga	
11	Happiness Charge PreCure!	9th	2014–2015	49	Tatsuya Nagamine	
12	Go! Princess PreCure	10th	2015–2016	50	Yuta Tanaka	
13	Witchy PreCure!	11th	2016–2017	50	Masato Mitsuka	
14	KiraKira PreCure a la Mode	12th	2017–2018	49	Kohei Kureta, Yukio Kaizawa	
15	HUG! Pretty Cure	13th	2018–2019	49	Junichi Sato, Akifumi Zako	
16	Star Twinkle PreCure	14th	2019–2020	49	Hiroaki Miyamoto	
17	Healin' Good Pretty Cure	15th	2020–2021	45	Yoko Ikeda	
18	Tropical-Rouge! Pretty Cure	16th	2021–2022	46	Yutaka Tsuchida	
19	Delicious Party Pretty Cure	17th	2022–2023	45	Toshinori Fukasawa	
20	Soaring Sky! PreCure	18th	2023–2024	50	Koji Ogawa	
21	Wonderful Precure!	19th	2024–2025	50	Masanori Sato	
22	You and Idol Precure	20th	2025–2026	49	Chiaki Kon	
23	Star Detective Precure!	21st	2026–2027	51	Koji Kawasaki	
Total	23	21	2004–present	1,067	21	

== Adaptations ==
=== Films ===
Starting in 2005, Beginning with Pretty Cure Max Heart, each television series has received a theatrical animated film based on the series, with Max Heart receiving two films.

Starting in 2009, crossover films featuring characters from multiple series have been released annually, with 14 crossover films released to date. The eleventh crossover film, Hug! Precure♡Pretty Cure: All Stars Memories, has been awarded the Guinness World Records title for "Most Magical Warriors in an Anime Film", with a total number of 55 Cures with speaking roles.

=== Extras ===
- Power of Hope: PreCure Full Bloom (2023)
- Witchy Pretty Cure!! Mirai Days (2025)
- PetitCure ~Precure Fairies~ (2025)
- Dual Shadow ~Precure Villain Heroines~ (2027)

=== The Stage ===
- Dancing Star Pretty Cure The Stage (2023)
- Dancing Star Pretty Cure The Stage 2 (2025)
- Dancing Star Pretty Cure The Stage 3 (2025)
- Dancing Star Pretty Cure The Stage Party (2026)
- Colorful Runway! Pretty Cure The Stage (2026)

=== Video games ===
Several video games have been produced by Bandai Namco Entertainment (formerly Bandai) for video game systems and educational consoles, as well as Data Carddass arcade machines.

Console Video games

- Pretty Cure: Unbelievable! The Dream Park is a Labryinth (ふたりはプリキュア ありえな～い！夢の園は大迷宮, Futari wa Purikyua: Arienai! Yume no En wa Daimeikyu) (2004, Game Boy Advance)
- Pretty Cure Max Heart: Really? Really!? A Fight is Okay, Isn't It? (ふたりはプリキュアマックスハート マジ?マジ?!ファイト de INじゃない, Futari wa Purikyua Max Heart: Maji? Maji!? Fight de IN Janai) (2005, Game Boy Advance)
- Pretty Cure Max Heart: Absolutely! Pretty Cure on DS - The Great Battle Where Power Gathers (ふたりはプリキュアマックスハート DANZEN!DSでプリキュア力をあわせて大バトル！!, Futari wa Purikyua Max Heart: Danzen! DS de Precure - Chikara o Awasete Dai Battle) (2005, Nintendo DS)
- PreCure Splash Star: In Top Condition for the PanPaka Game! (ふたりはプリキュア Splash Star パンパカゲームでぜっこうちょう!, Futari wa Purikyua Splash Star: Panpaka Game de Zekkōchō!) (2006, Nintendo DS)
- Yes! PreCure 5 (Yes！プリキュア5, Yes! Purikyua 5) (2007, Nintendo DS)
- Yes! PreCure 5 GoGo!: All Assembled! Dream Festival (Yes！プリキュア5GoGo！ 全員しゅーGo!ドリームフェスティバル, Yes! Purikyua 5 GoGo!: Zenin Shu Go! Dream Festival) (2008, Nintendo DS)
- Fresh PreCure! Play Collection (フレッシュプリキュア!あそびコレクション, Furessh Purikyua! Asobi Collection) (2009, Nintendo DS)
- Heart Catch PreCure Fashion Collection (ハートキャッチプリキュア!おしゃれコレクション, Hātokyatchi Purikyua! Oshare Collection) (2010, Nintendo DS)
- Let's Play With Voices! Heart Catch PreCure (こえであそぼう!ハートキャッチプリキュア!, Koe de Asobō! Hātokyatchi Purikyua!) (2010, Nintendo DS)
- Suite PreCure: Melody Collection (スイートプリキュア♪ メロディコレクション) (2011, Nintendo DS)
- Smile PreCure! Let's Go! Märchen World (スマイルプリキュア! レッツゴー！メルヘンワールド) (2012, Nintendo 3DS)
- PreCure All Stars: All Together☆Let's Dance! (プリキュアオールスターズ ぜんいんしゅうごう☆レッツダンス！, Purikyuaōrusutāzu: Zenin Shūgō Let's Dance!) (2013, Wii)
- DokiDoki! PreCure: Impersonator Life! (ドキドキ!プリキュア なりきりライフ!, DokiDoki! Precure: Narikiri Life!) (2013, Nintendo 3DS)
- Happiness Charge PreCure! Sparking Collection (ハピネスチャージプリキュア! カワルン☆コレクション, HappinessCharge PreCure! Kawarun Collection) (2014, Nintendo 3DS)
- Go! Princess PreCure: The Sugar Kingdom and the 6 Princesses (Go!プリンセスプリキュア シュガー王国と6人のプリンセス, Go! Purinsesu Purikyua: Sugar Ōkoku to Rokunin no Princess) (2015, Nintendo 3DS)
- PreCure Connecting Puzzlun (プリキュアつながるぱずるん, PreCure Tsunagaru Puzzlun) (2017-2020, iOS, Android)
- Nari Kids Park: HUG! Pretty Cure (なりキッズパーク HUGっと！プリキュア) (2018, Nintendo Switch)

Arcade game

- PreCure All Stars Data Carddass series (プリキュアデータカードダスシリーズ) (2007–2017)

Educational titles

- Pretty Cure (ふたりはプリキュア) (2004, Sega Pico)
- Pretty Cure: Max Heart (ふたりはプリキュアMax Heart) (2005, Beena)
- PreCure Splash Star (ふたりはプリキュアスプラッシュスター) (2006, Beena)
- Yes! Precure 5 Go Go: Love Love Hiragana Lesson (Yes！プリキュア5GoGo！lovelove☆ひらがなレッスン) (2008, Beena)
- Let's change: Fresh PreCure! (いっしょにへんしんフレッシュプリキュア！) (2009, Beena)
- Let's do some stylish change: Heart Catch PreCure (おしゃれにへんしん ハートキャッチプリキュア！) (2010, Beena)
- Suite PreCure: Happy Stylish Harmony (スイートプリキュア♪ハッピーおしゃれハーモニー☆) (2011, Beena)

=== Live-action Drama ===
A live-action series, Koe Girl! (声ガール！, Koe Gāru!), aired in Japan between April and June 2018, celebrating the franchise's 15th anniversary. The series follows a group of aspiring voice actresses and stars Haruka Fukuhara, who voiced Himari Arisugawa/Cure Custard in KiraKira PreCure a la Mode.

== Reception ==
The combination of transmedia text products, including anime series, films, live performances, theme stores, and toys, has been analyzed as a "system of consumption, knowledge and action [that] creates a lifestyle-text, a set of fictional media works that are synonymous with the lifestyle practices they promote."

The Pretty Cure films are the seventh highest-grossing anime film franchise. Bandai Namco's net income from Pretty Cure video game sales was ¥3.6 billion ($45.12 million) from April 2008 to March 2012, ¥1 billion ($13 million) from April 2012 to March 2013, ¥700 million ($7.17 million) from April 2013 to March 2014, and ¥800 million ($7.8 million) from April 2014 to December 2020, adding up to ¥6.1 billion ($73.1 million) net sales revenue for Bandai Namco.

=== Merchandise ===
Pretty Cure has had numerous licensed merchandise sold in Japan. By 2010, it became Japan's fifth highest-grossing franchise annually.

Pretty Cure licensed merchandise sales in Japan
Year	Japan licensed merchandise sales	Note	Ref
2004	Unknown		
2005	¥56.7 billion		
2006	¥6 billion	Bandai toys only	
2007	¥44.48 billion		
2008	¥49.92 billion		
2009	¥62.45 billion		
2010	¥76.65 billion		
2011	¥10.3 billion	Bandai Namco toys only	
2012	¥63.51 billion		
2013	¥61.7 billion		
2014	¥45.46 billion		
2015	¥45.64 billion		
2016	¥49.76 billion		
2017	¥48.05 billion		
2018	¥50.59 billion		
2019	¥42.47 billion		
2020	¥6.9 billion	Bandai Namco toys only	
2005–2013	¥431.86 billion+ ($5.271 billion+)		
2014–2020	¥288.87 billion+ ($2.802 billion+)		
2005–2020	¥720.73 billion+ ($8.074 billion+)		
