= List of Hell Girl episodes =

Hell Girl is a Japanese anime series produced by Studio Deen in three seasons between 2005 and 2009, with a fourth season airing in 2017. The plot follows a girl named Ai Enma, also known as the Jigoku Shōjo or Hell Girl, and her group of followers as they carry out her duty of striking contracts that involve ferrying hated souls to Hell.

The first season, titled Hell Girl (地獄少女, Jigoku Shōjo), was directed by Takahiro Ōmori and written by Hiroshi Watanabe. This season revolves around investigations by Hajime Shibatao and Tsugumi Shibata into Ai Enma's secrets. It premiered across Japan on Kids Station on October 4, 2005, and episode 26 aired on April 4, 2006. The second season, titled Hell Girl: Two Mirrors (地獄少女 二籠, Jigoku Shōjo Futakomori), was also directed by Takahiro Ōmori and written by Hiroshi Watanabe. This season details the past of each of Ai's followers and the story of a boy named Takuma Kurebayashi. It aired across Japan from October 7, 2006, to April 7, 2007, on Animax and spanned 26 episodes. The third season, titled Jigoku Shōjo Mitsuganae (地獄少女 三鼎, lit. Hell Girl: Three Vessels), was directed by Hiroshi Watanabe and written by Ken'ichi Kanemaki. The third season revolved around Ai's possession of a middle school student, named Yuzuki Mikage and Yuzuki's past. It aired across Japan from October 10, 2008, to April 4, 2009, on Tokyo MX spanning 26 episodes.

Animax later translated and dubbed the first season of the series into English for broadcast across its English language networks in Southeast Asia and South Asia. Animax also aired the series worldwide across its other networks in various other languages, including in Hong Kong, Taiwan, South Korea, Vietnam, Europe and other regions. The first season of the series was licensed for North American distribution by Funimation Entertainment. The series began broadcasting on the United States cable/satellite channel IFC in July 2008. The next 52 episodes have been licensed by Sentai Filmworks under the title Hell Girl: Series 2.

== Series overview ==
Season	Subtitle	Episodes		Originally released	
Season	Subtitle	Episodes		First released	Last released
1	Hell Girl	26		October 4, 2005	April 4, 2006
2	Two Mirrors	26		October 7, 2006	April 7, 2007
3	Three Vessels	26		October 4, 2008	April 4, 2009
4	Fourth Twilight	12	6	July 14, 2017	August 18, 2017
4	Reminiscent	12	6	August 25, 2017	September 29, 2017

== Episode list ==
=== Anime ===
==== Hell Girl ====
- Opening theme: Sakasama no Chō (逆さまの蝶, "The Inversed Butterfly")
  - Lyrics: SNoW, Hideaki Yamano
  - Composition: SNoW, Asanjō Shindō
  - Arrangement: Asanjō Shindō, Ken'ichi Fujita
  - Performance: SNoW
- Ending theme: Karinui (かりぬい, lit. "Basting")
  - Lyrics: Hitomi Mieno
  - Composition: Masara Nishida
  - Arrangement: Masara Nishida
  - Performance: Mamiko Noto

No.	Title	Original release date
1	"From Beyond the Twilight"; Transliteration: "Yūyami no Kanata Yori" (Japanese: 夕闇の彼方より)	October 4, 2005
Mayumi Hashimoto, a junior high school student, is bullied by classmate Aya Kuroda, a sukeban. Aya is framing Mayumi for embezzling class money, coercing her into immoral behavior and blackmailing her. Mayumi overhears of a website that exacts revenge by sending the object of one's grudge to hell. Visiting the website at midnight, she learns that the price of sending her enemy to hell is the cost of her own soul. She hesitates, but her situation gets worse, and in desperation, she sends Aya to Hell. Free of her enemy, her life becomes peaceful again; yet she must now live the remainder of her life knowing that she will go to Hell after she dies, bearing the mark of what she has done on her chest.
2	"The Possessed Girl"; Transliteration: "Miirareta Shōjo" (Japanese: 魅入られた少女)	October 11, 2005
Ryōko Takamura has been tormented by a stalker for the past year. Her family seeks the aid of investigator Kōichirō Kisaragi, unaware that he is in fact the stalker. Ai Enma, the Hell Girl, gives Ryōko a doll with a red thread around its neck; if she removes the thread, it confirms her contract with Hell Girl and sends her enemy to hell. When she is kidnapped by Detective Kisaragi, who also attacks her father, Ryōko sends him to Hell in self defense.
3	"The Tarnished Mound"; Transliteration: "Yogoreta Maundo" (Japanese: 汚れたマウンド)	October 18, 2005
High school baseball player Daisuke Iwashita's friend and teammate Shinichi Muroi is being bullied by their team's ace pitcher, Mamoru Hanagasa. After Shinichi dies from injuries inflicted by Mamoru, Daisuke is framed for the murder and the town turns against him. In desperation, Daisuke accesses the Hell Link. He gives Mamoru a chance to confess but when he laughs him off, he sends Mamoru to Hell. Shinichi's death avenged, Daisuke moves to another town to start over, knowing his soul now belongs to Hell.
4	"Silent Cries"; Transliteration: "Kikoenu Sakebigoe" (Japanese: 聞こえぬ叫び声)	October 25, 2005
Junko Kanno takes her sick dog to a veterinarian, Yoshiyuki Honjō, for treatment, but her dog dies anyway. Junko find out through the veterinarian's assistant, Masami Sekimoto, that Honjō had not bothered to treat her dog. She discovers that Honjō does not care about treating animals. For both her dog's sake and the other animals, Junko sends him to Hell.
5	"The Woman in the High Tower"; Transliteration: "Takai Tō no Onna" (Japanese: 高い塔の女)	November 1, 2005
Riho Kaifu, the CEO of a computer company (but ironically computer-illiterate), coerces a junior high school student and computer expert named Misato Tamura into working for her as a hacker, going as far as to order her to hack the Hell Correspondence website. However, Misato is unable to take much more of Riho's abuse and ends up using Hell Correspondence for her own means.
6	"Early Afternoon Window"; Transliteration: "Hirusagari no Mado" (Japanese: 昼下がりの窓)	November 8, 2005
Keiko Yasuda witnesses her neighbor, Namiko Todaka, committing adultery while walking past Todaka's house one afternoon. Knowing this, Namiko constantly harasses Keiko so that the latter would keep what she saw to herself. Namiko also encourages her daughter, Yuria, to bully Haruka, Keiko's daughter, at school. Haruka seeks revenge against Namiko after watching her mother constantly suffer and after having suffered under Yuria's bullying as well.
7	"Cracked Mask"; Transliteration: "Hibiwareta Kamen" (Japanese: ひびわれた仮面)	November 15, 2005
Ayaka Kurenai, a rising theater actress, schemes against fellow actress Kaoruko Kurushima after the latter outshines her in their theater company. After having thugs force Kaoruko to drink a tonic that ruins her voice, Midori Kurenai, Ayaka's adopted mother and the owner of their theatrical company, cancels the show, knowing what Ayaka did. Outraged, Ayaka attempts to send Midori to Hell, only to find that the straw doll given to her has become an ordinary straw doll because Kaoruko already requested that Ayaka be sent to Hell for what she did.
8	"Silent Acquaintances"; Transliteration: "Seijaku no Majiwari" (Japanese: 静寂の交わり)	November 22, 2005
Chie Tanuma seeks revenge against Gorō Ishizu after she witnesses the latter shove her best friend (Ishizu's girlfriend) off a building, injuring her. This episode marks the debut of seven-year-old Tsugumi Shibata and her father named Hajime Shibata, who becomes entangled in Hell Girl's affairs.
9	"Sweet Trap"; Transliteration: "Amai Wana" (Japanese: 甘い罠)	November 29, 2005
Yuka Kasuga and her sister, Hiromi fulfill their dream of opening a bakeshop, and allow their father's friend, famous baker Shinya Morizaki, to taste one of their father's unique creations. After Morizaki then steals their recipe and claims it as his own on national television, the reputation of the Kasugas' bakeshop suffers greatly, and they go bankrupt. Yuka uses the Hell Correspondence to send Morizaki to Hell.
10	"Friends"; Transliteration: "Tomodachi" (Japanese: トモダチ)	December 6, 2005
After Minami Shibuya's friend Shiori Akasaka abandons Minami for another group of friends, Minami accesses the Hell Link to send her to Hell. However, after Shiori is outcast from her new clique, she runs back to Minami. Minami abandons her plan to banish Shiori. Shiori, discovering the straw doll but not fully understanding its purpose, tries to use it against the girls who outcast her. She forces Minami to pull the string against Minami's will, sending the selfish Shiori to Hell. Hajime Shibata witnesses Shiori disappear, and Minami tells him she will soon join her in Hell.
11	"Broken Threads"; Transliteration: "Chigireta Ito" (Japanese: 千切れた糸)	December 13, 2005
Masaya Kataoka seeks revenge against crooked journalist Tadashi Inagaki, who framed his late father for criminal misdeeds. Hajime Shibata, now aware of the Hell Correspondence and its hellish price, tries to stop Masaya from using the straw doll by searching for evidence against Inagaki to clear his father's name. However, Masaya believes that is not enough punishment for Inagaki, and sends him to Hell anyway.
12	"Spilled Bits"; Transliteration: "Koboreta Kakeratachi" (Japanese: 零れたカケラ達)	December 20, 2005
Akane Sawai becomes a hikikomori due to depression; she only interacts with her textmate, whom she met online. Her concerned teacher, Yoshiki Fukasawa, constantly visits her to try to convince her to return to school. Akane gets irritated by this and decides to send Fukasawa to Hell but later finds out her textmate is Fukasawa. They are both depressed and tired of life. Looking for an end, Fukasawa convinces Akane to send him to Hell. In Hell, when Fukasawa learns Akane will also go to Hell when she dies, he feels regret but hears Akane, who is strangely at peace with the idea of going there, tell him to wait for her.
13	"Purgatory Girl"; Transliteration: "Rengoku Shōjo" (Japanese: 煉獄少女)	December 27, 2005
Hajime Shibata continues his investigation of Hell Correspondence after his daughter Tsugumi has another vision. He discovers that Hell Correspondence isn't a recent phenomenon but has been occurring for centuries. Before the Internet, it was accessed through ads in newspapers. Hajime meets an elderly illustrator, Fukumoto, who sent a man to Hell fifty years ago using Hell Girl, and published a story about it. Fukumoto has become infatuated with the visage of Ai Enma, and looks forward to seeing her one last time. He dies after enigmatically telling Hajime he wrote the story for him.
14	"Beyond the Dead Alley"; Transliteration: "Fukurokōji no Mukō" (Japanese: 袋小路の向こう)	January 3, 2006
Saki Kirino seeks revenge for the death of her father, a Japanese politician who was earnestly trying to do good; Mayor Ryuzo Kusunoki, while the hero of the town, seems to have nefarious yakuza ties that assassinated her father for trying to blackmail and expose him. Hajime Shibata tries to stop Saki from using Hell Girl and manages to convince Kusunoki to apologize, but she refuses to forgive him and sends Kusunoki to Hell.
15	"Island Woman"; Transliteration: "Shima no Onna" (Japanese: 島の女)	January 17, 2006
After Tsugumi has a vision of a girl on an island, she and Hajime travel there and meet Mina Minato, who lives with her domineering and paranoid aunt, Fujie. Fujie refuses to let Mina live life away from their tiny island; in reality Fujie's psyche was broken after a traumatizing event and she is deranged. Mina's boyfriend Yuji was also attacked by Fujie for trying to escape to the mainland with Mina. After finding out that Fujie had killed her mother just to prevent her from leaving the island, and in danger of being the next to die, Mina sends her aunt to Hell in self defense.
16	"A Night Among Traveling Entertainers"; Transliteration: "Tabigeinin no Yoru" (Japanese: 旅芸人の夜)	January 24, 2006
Yuki and Yumi, twin sisters, work as circus performers. Even though she is a worse performer than Yumi, Yuki makes sure she is favored over Yumi, being pampered while Yumi is heinously physically abused by the ringmaster, who is also the twins' father. After Tsugumi's vision of this, Hajime tries to intervene, but Yumi, unable to take the injustice, sends her own twin sister to Hell. Ai Enma (Hell Girl) shows a rare moment of sympathy and comfort to the broken Yumi, which Tsugumi witnesses.
17	"Glass Scenery"; Transliteration: "Garasu no Fūkei" (Japanese: 硝子ノ風景)	January 31, 2006
Heavy fog on the highway strands the Shibatas at an eerie sanitarium, where they meet a mysterious girl named Nina. When they try to leave, Nina reveals supernatural powers and tries to trap them there. Ai Enma saves the Shibatas by asking Nina to try to remember who she really is: Nina is not Nina at all but the soul of Nina's doll; the real Nina died years ago after being abandoned at the sanitorium by her father. During this, Hajime catches a glimpse of Hell Girl for the first time. Ai's companions wonder if Ai is subconsciously sending clues to the Shibatas without knowing she is.
18	"Bound Girl"; Transliteration: "Shibarareta Shōjo" (Japanese: 縛られた少女)	February 7, 2006
Miki Kawakami finds herself and her two Welsh Corgies enslaved by Meiko Shimono, an evil and reclusive rich woman; because Miki's dogs bit her, Shimono now holds the dogs hostage and forces Miki to be her slave. Miki calls for Ai Enma's help when Shimono kills one of her dogs, hoping to save the other. When Hajime decides to intervene again, Tsugumi asks why they must stop Hell Girl if the people she takes deserve it. Miki hesitates, and it is revealed that Shimono killed her parents and her own child to keep her inherited fortune to herself; Shimono is arrested. When Miki realizes Shimono had killed not only her other dog, but—in the moments before her arrest—even the dog's newborn puppies, she pulls the string. Shimono disappears from the back of the police car, having been sent directly to Hell, while Miki wishes she had not hesitated.
19	"The Puppet Bride"; Transliteration: "Hanayome Ningyō" (Japanese: 花嫁人形)	February 14, 2006
An orphan named Inori was picked by her orphanage's main benefactress, a doll-maker named Kyogetsu, to be her son's bride—but with the condition that she literally act like a doll: Inori is to do nothing, not even serve breakfast, except sit still, eat very little and remain beautiful, tortured by Kyogetsu if she does not follow these commands. For the sake of the orphanage, Inori puts up with the mistreatment for as long as she can, but is pushed to her limit and sends Kyogetsu to Hell, only to find that her husband wants her to be like a doll too.
20	"Hell Girl vs. Hell Boy"; Transliteration: "Jigoku Shōjo tai Jigoku Shōnen" (Japanese: 地獄少女 対 地獄少年)	February 21, 2006
TV psychic Gilles de L'Enfer seeks to prove his powers against Hell Girl. Ai and her companions seem overmatched, but Hiroshi "Esper" Watanabe, the phony whom Gilles had humiliated and manipulated to summon Hell Girl, wants revenge. L'Enfer manages to catch glimpses of Ai's past while Ai's companions muse that Ai must have some kind of connection to Hajime's daughter, Tsugumi, since she can sometimes see through Ai's eyes (her visions).
21	"Kind Neighbor"; Transliteration: "Yasashii Rinjin" (Japanese: 優しい隣人)	February 28, 2006
Yūko Murai and her father move to the farm her father inherited. Ryōsuke Sekine, their neighbor, eagerly helps them out with the farm but has an ulterior motive. When the farm is overrun by pests and fails, Yūko's father resorts to alcoholism and dies. Yūko discovers that Sekine had sabotaged their crops in order to settle an old grudge against her family. She wants to send him to Hell but is convinced otherwise by Hajime, and for the first time in the series, the intended target is not sent to Hell, much to the annoyance of Ai's companions, who are irritated that Hajime keeps interfering with their job. At the end of the episode, it is implied that Yūko could have a second chance to summon Hell Girl.
22	"Rain of Regret"; Transliteration: "Kaikon no Ame" (Japanese: 悔恨の雨)	March 7, 2006
A rift grows between Hajime and Tsugumi because of their differing views: Hajime believes revenge only causes more suffering, while Tsugumi believes the people sent to Hell deserve it. Goro Suetsugu, a husband being cheated on by his wife, Noriko Hayashi, calls on Ai and sends his wife to Hell, due to the fact that Noriko is a golddigger, and sees men as a source of wealth. His feelings remind Hajime of his own past: throwing himself into his work to support his wife Ayumi and new baby Tsugumi, Hajime neglects Ayumi, causing her to become lonely and cheat on him. After Hajime leaves her, Ayumi dies in a car accident.
23	"The Light of a Ward"; Transliteration: "Byōtō no Hikari" (Japanese: 病棟の光)	March 14, 2006
Tsugumi's visions point to nurse Kanako Sakuragi as Ai's next target. She is kind and sweet, loved by her patients and coworkers. Hajime is unable to find anyone who would have a reason to send her to Hell. But when Kanako is indeed sent there, seemingly for no fault of her own, by an unknown drug addict who commits suicide right after. Hajime and Tsugumi are shaken by such meaningless vengeance. Ai is also shown doubting her job after the request for Kanako, saddened to be ferrying an innocent soul to Hell.
24	"The Twilight Village"; Transliteration: "Yūgure no Sato" (Japanese: 夕暮れの里)	March 21, 2006
Realizing that their fates are linked to Hell Girl, the Shibatas follow Tsugumi's latest vision to the mountains. There, they learn that they are in fact the distant relatives of Sentaro, a young village boy who was Ai Enma's close childhood friend. Ai, usually placid, becomes overcome with anger upon realizing that Sentaro's bloodline is still alive; it is revealed that Ai was buried alive when she was a child by none other than Sentaro. She attacks Tsugumi and Hajime, yelling that she will not be a victim again. Her companions try to stop her, pleading for her to control her emotions—if Ai takes vengeance, she will go to Hell.
25	"Hell Girl"; Transliteration: "Jigoku Shōjo" (Japanese: 地獄少女)	March 28, 2006
Ai's sad past is revealed: Doomed to be a harvest sacrifice at seven years old, Ai is abandoned in the mountains to die; her parents and Sentaro Shibata, who is actually her older cousin (meaning the Shibatas are in fact related to Ai as well) and only friend, want to save her, so she is sheltered in the mountains, where Sentaro smuggles her food and water. Six years pass, and it seems Sentaro and Ai have feelings for each other. When Ai is discovered by the villagers, they bury her and her parents alive as punishment, and force Sentaro to help; Ai's grudge is born of this betrayal. Heartbroken, Sentaro leaves the village. It is also revealed that Ai saved her three companions from hellish fates, for which they are indebted to her.
26	"Basting"; Transliteration: "Karinui" (Japanese: かりぬい)	April 4, 2006
Ai encourages Tsugumi to send her father Hajime to Hell, using her late mother Ayumi's death to provoke her. Her companions reveal that Ai becoming Hell Girl was in fact a punishment from Hell. Hajime breaks down about Ayumi but Tsugumi, calling him "Daddy" for the first time instead of by his name, says she loves him. She tells Ai that Sentaro loved her and regretted his part in her death, due to which he built the mountain temple in honor of her. Ai calms down and destroys Sentaro's temple, deciding to let Hajime and Tsugumi go. Thereafter, she continues her job as Hell Girl.

==== Hell Girl: Two Mirrors (Futakomori) ====
- Opening theme: NightmaRe
  - Lyrics: Hideaki Yamano
  - Composition: SNoW, Asanjō Shindō
  - Performance: SNoW
- Ending theme: Aizome (あいぞめ, lit. "Indigo Dye")
  - Lyrics: Aa (savage genius)
  - Composition: Takumi (savage genius)
  - Arrangement: Masara Nishida
  - Performance: Mamiko Noto

No.	Title	Original release date
1	"The Girl in the Dark"; Transliteration: "Yami no Naka no Shōjo" (Japanese: 闇の中の少女)	October 7, 2006
This episode reveals that after being buried alive, Ai Enma had risen and destroyed her entire village in hatred, killing the villagers. The Master of Hell decides that Ai's punishment will be to remain on Earth as Hell Girl to atone for her sins by witnessing others' hatred instead of going to Hell. In present day, Maki Onda is being horrendously bullied in school, but she doesn't know who is bullying her. Her science teacher, Eiko Kamishiro, tries to help her, but Onda finds out through her classmate that Kamishiro is the one who has been bullying her. She sends Kamishiro to Hell.
2	"Bubbles"; Transliteration: "Utakata" (Japanese: うたかた)	October 14, 2006
Yayoi Kurayoshi's sister, Sumire, has gone missing. Yayoi constantly hears the sound of underwater bubbles, and realizes her sister is dead and wants her to take revenge on her behalf. However, because she doesn't know the identity of the killer, Yayoi can't access the Hell website. One of Ai's companions, Ichimoku Ren, keeps tabs on her, intrigued. Yayoi has a vision of what happened to her sister: Sumire was kidnapped, raped and killed, the body stuffed into a suitcase and dumped in a lake. Yayoi sends the murderer to Hell for Sumire, pulling the string without any hesitation.
3	"Beloved Kei"; Transliteration: "Itoshi no Kei-chan" (Japanese: 愛しのけいちゃん)	October 21, 2006
Tae Sakairi is obsessively protective of her neighbor and childhood friend, Kei. She refuses to admit her love for him because she believes their relationship would fall apart. After discovering his girlfriend Yumie is cheating on him, Kei sleeps with Tae when she comforts him. Tae becomes afraid that their relationship will change and refuses to open her window when Kei says he loves her. Kei slips as he's trying to come through her window, and falls to his death. Tae sends Yumie to Hell for causing Kei pain and having no remorse about his death. She moves to a new area and finds that her new neighbor looks almost exactly like Kei.
4	"Secret"; Transliteration: "Himitsu" (Japanese: 秘密)	October 28, 2006
Shuichi Yagisawa's wife, Chinami, is in the hospital, sick with an illness. In heavy debt, Yagisawa accesses the Hell website to get revenge on Houki, at whose urging he murdered someone for money. Houki tells Chinami that her husband killed someone, causing her to go into a coma due to distress. Because of this, Yagisawa sends Houki to Hell. When his wife wakes up, she no longer remembers him. Ai's second companion, Hone-Onna, encounters a strange little girl, Kikuri, who seems inhuman, and they are all stunned when Ai brings Kikuri into her supernatural world, making her part of the group.
5	"Barreling Towards Hell"; Transliteration: "Jigoku e no Bōsō" (Japanese: 地獄への暴走)	November 4, 2006
Leon Yamada is a ruthless bully, constantly bullying Oi-chan, a geek. Oi-chan seeks a contract with Ai but changes his mind after learning the price for it. Leon is in love with a high school girl named Izumi Miyahara. He plans to confess to her and leave the gang he is in. Leon's gang leader, Rikiya Hashitsume, refuses to let him leave. After Leon submits the gang leader's name, not caring nor believing in its consequence, Rikiya kidnaps Izumi to take advantage of her, but is sent to Hell. Shortly after, Leon has an accident on his motorcycle and dies, immediately going to Hell. As a result, the flame on the candle with his name goes out.
6	"Where the Sun Shines"; Transliteration: "Hi no Ataru Basho" (Japanese: 陽のあたる場所)	November 11, 2006
Souta Hosono is a hikikomori, an antisocial boy who spends his school time in the infirmary. He becomes infatuated with a classmate, Kiwako Nitta, stalking her and her boyfriend, Hirohisa Sugita. One day, Souta overhears Hirohisa telling his friend, Sawazaki, that he will "lend" Kiwako to him so that Sawazaki can lose his virginity by raping her. Souta accesses the Hell website to send Hirohisa to Hell but Ai rejects him because his rage is not strong enough. Souta begs Ai to save Kiwako but refuses to sell his soul in exchange; Ai tells him that her service is not for seeking justice. Kiwako is drugged and raped; she later tells Souta that she has sent Hirohisa to Hell for what he did. Souta is shocked that she would agree to go to Hell for that and turns down Ai's help, deciding to kill Sawazaki himself.
7	"Bonds"; Transliteration: "Kizuna" (Japanese: 絆)	November 18, 2006
Emi Ougi's family has become dysfunctional ever since her brother, Tatsuya, died in a motorcycle accident. Her mother ignores the family, and is trying to get the city to take responsibility for her son's death. Emi tries to help her, but her mother's mental state deteriorates and she remains unconcerned for her daughter; even when Tatsuya was alive, she never cared about Emi—Tatsuya was everything to her. Emi learns that her brother had Ai's doll but had not used it yet; now, it is Emi's. Unable to bear her insane mother any longer, Emi sends her mother to hell. However, after her father leaves to find her mother, leaving Emi completely on her own, Emi becomes insane as well and starts pretending her family is still around her.
8	"The Fake Hell Link"; Transliteration: "Nise Jigoku Tsūshin" (Japanese: 偽地獄通信)	November 25, 2006
Shouko Baba is a teacher everyone dislikes because she frequently scolds students. A fake Hell website is created and circulated among the students. The school blames a student named Waka Ikami but Ikami claims she didn't do it. Mami Kuriyama, a teacher, tells Ikami it was Baba who made the fake website and framed her for it. She tries to convince Ikami to send Baba to Hell. She is shocked when she is confronted with Ai: Mami had contacted Ai 9 years ago, when she was in junior high herself to send the same Baba to Hell. Mami was the one who actually created the fake Hell site because she blames Baba for all her life problems; however, she is too afraid to go to Hell herself. Baba hears this and sends Mami to Hell for trying to use her students as sacrifices.
9	"Elder Brother, Younger Sister"; Transliteration: "Ani Imōto" (Japanese: あにいもうと)	December 2, 2006
Though Maho Suzaki loves her brother, Mikio Suzaki, she also hates him for chasing away her boyfriends. Intrigued, Ichimoto Ren investigates while Ai spends time with the strange little girl, Kikuri. Maho discovers that Mikio has been dressing up as a woman and seducing and stealing her boyfriends from her. Mikio confesses that he does it to prevent Maho from seeing other men and ultimately leaving him because he's in love with her. Shocked, Maho can no longer take the pressure and heartbrokenly sends him to Hell.
10	"Anna Sone's Intimate Holiday"; Transliteration: "Sone Anna no Nureta Kyūjitsu" (Japanese: 曽根アンナの濡れた休日)	December 9, 2006
Hone-Onna meets a director named Tetsuro Megoro. He wants Hone-Onna to be the protagonist (Sone Anna) in his film. He is obsessed with writing screenplays, though lacks ambition and determination. He also has a wife and a lover, but is uninterested in both of them. After Tetsuro leaves his wife and lover, Kumiko, for another woman, his wife, Kumiko and Hone-Onna become good friends. After a series of mishaps in Tetsuro's life, he returns to the women, and they decide to go on a little vacation. Being clumsy and foolish, Tetsuro bangs into a stranger's car, ruining it, and a few hours later, spills coffee on the same man. The man sends Tetsuro to Hell for ruining his car, and Hone-Onna erases herself from Kumiko and Tetsuro's wife's memories.
11	"The Distant Room Next Door"; Transliteration: "Tōi Rinshitsu" (Japanese: 遠い隣室)	December 16, 2006
Shizuko Amagi, who just moved into a new apartment, adopts a stray cat and names it Muru. She begins to receive prank calls and other threats, warning her to throw out the cat. With a private investigation agency, she discovers that it is her neighbor, Kyoko Tachibana, sending threats. She posts a letter to Tachibana, apologizing and saying she will move out as soon as she can. Later, she finds Muru gone, with a bag filled with meat outside. Thinking it is Muru, she sends Tachibana to Hell. It is revealed that the cat belonged to Tachibana, who was upset that Amagi adopted it, but never thought of simply talking it out with her. Amagi discovers Muru alive and well, the bag of meat being nothing but another prank.
12	"Black Rut"; Transliteration: "Kuro no Wadachi" (Japanese: 黒の轍)	December 23, 2006
A new road needs to be built to stop the traffic accidents in the area, but is blocked by a house, occupied by an old man who refuses to move. After a young boy died at the road, his older brother, truck driver Michiro Ito, wants vengeance on the old man. He picks up one of Ai's companions, Wanyuudou, who is there to assess the situation, as Ito had summoned Hell Girl. His request is annulled when the old man dies. Ito doesn't believe it and goes to ram his truck into the man's house, and nearly gets into the same accident as his brother. Wanyuudou, reminded of his past, saves him. Hone-Onna hands Ito the old man's will: he has left his land to Ito's family due to guilt over Ito's brother's death. During this episode, Wanyuudou's past is explained.
13	"Tragedy of the V"; Transliteration: "V no Sangeki" (Japanese: Vの惨劇)	January 6, 2007
Mysterious deaths have been happening all over town: Men have been found stabbed dead with their fingers in the "peace" symbol. Kihachi Kusumi, the owner of a restaurant, is discovered by Ai's companions to be the culprit. His wife and son were killed and his daughter, Tsubaki, went into a coma after a dreadful car accident 5 years ago. As news crews filmed the report, drunk men danced in front of the cameras, flashing the peace sign. Offended, the owner recently decided to kill them, as he learned he has cancer and will not live to see his daughter awaken. For the last person, he uses the Hell site. As Kihachi is taken by police, Kikuri wakes Tsubaki. The price Kusumi must pay for the murders is that he will spend his life in jail or die, unable to be with his daughter.
14	"The Peaceful Lakeshore"; Transliteration: "Shizuka na Kohan" (Japanese: 静かな湖畔)	January 13, 2007
A washed-up scriptwriter named Kakinuma decides to take revenge on his producer friend whom he worked under because the producer became famous while Kakinuma was labeled his copycat. During his attempted revenge, the producer's wife is killed and their son, Takuma Kurebayashi, is framed. Takuma contacts Hell Girl but decides not to go through with it, leaving it to the police. Shortly after however, Kakinuma kills Takuma's father. Before he can kill Takuma too, his ex-lover sends him to hell because he killed their unborn child by pushing her down the stairs. Because of Kakinuma's disappearance, Takuma is accused of killing both his parents.
15	"For the Sake of This Country"; Transliteration: "Kono Kuni no Tame ni" (Japanese: この国のために)	January 20, 2007
A young woman, Yuriko, and her father have devoted themselves to the cause of a political candidate running for office. While they complain about how the current government is terrible, Yuriko's mother works herself sick running their factory. Yuriko learns that her father has been abusing her mother. She misses an important rally, angering her father, who hires men to attack Yuriko to teach her a lesson. Wanyuudo saves her and Yuriko discovers it was her father who sent them. She tries to send him to Hell but Ai reveals that her mother already had a contract on him. Upon hearing of the attack on her daughter, Yuriko's mother finally pulls the string on her doll.
16	"Aspiring Femme Fatale"; Transliteration: "Akujo Shigan" (Japanese: 悪女志願)	January 27, 2007
A quiet girl named Ran Henmi wishes to send the man who betrayed her to Hell, but meets a geisha Matsu Uetsuki who says she has a better plan. Matsu gives Ran a makeover so she can seduce the man. Hone-Onna watches over Ran, as Ran reminds her of her own past as a geisha. Ran and the geisha steal all of the man's money. Penniless, the man kills himself. Disturbed, Ran tries to back out, but the geisha, revealing she has used Ran, stabs her and flees with the money. As Ran is dying in Hone-Onna's arms, she sends Matsu to Hell so that the geisha won't deceive any more innocent girls.
17	"Silent Gaze"; Transliteration: "Chinmoku no Manazashi" (Japanese: 沈黙のまなざし)	February 3, 2007
A girl named Nene contacts Hell Girl to send her mother, Honami, to Hell because she and her paternal grandmother think Honami killed her father. Ren watches over Honami, worried about her since she did nothing wrong. The truth is, Honami sent her husband to Hell eleven years ago because he was abusive. Honami then finds out that Nene is trying to send her to Hell, so she jumps off a bridge to save her daughter's soul. Ren's past as a tsukumogami is revealed in this episode.
18	"That Person's Memory"; Transliteration: "Ano Hito no Kioku" (Japanese: あのひとの記憶)	February 10, 2007
Rina comes home one day to find that her mother, who had left the family when Rina was a little girl, has returned an invalid, and her father wants her to take care of her from now on, upsetting Rina, as her mother treats her harshly. She tries to use Hell Girl to get rid of her mother, but discovers that her father has already contacted Ai. Her father reveals the truth: her mother is not her real mother. After discovering she was infertile, his wife suggested he have a child with another woman. However, she was only testing him: when he really did do that, his wife, unable to accept it, attempts suicide. Rina's father sends her to Hell after she says she cannot forgive him or accept Rina, although Rina does not blame her mother now.
19	"Hell Amidst the Steam, Lodging for Travelers"; Transliteration: "Yukemuri Jigoku, Tabi no Yado" (Japanese: 湯けむり地獄、旅の宿)	February 17, 2007
The story of how Wannyuudo came to join Ai is told as a family whose ancestors were clients of Ai's 400 years ago once again employs her services.
20	"A Maiden's Album"; Transliteration: "Otome no Arubamu" (Japanese: 乙女のアルバム)	February 24, 2007
Mari is in an abusive relationship with her friend, Juri. Juri contacted Ai because she and Mari had a close friendship that was ruined in her eyes when Mari considered having someone else as her tennis double. Juri blackmails Mari to do what she says by threatening her with Ai's straw doll. Ren becomes involved, and Mari hugs him when he comforts her. Juri is angry that Mari could be close to anyone else and runs off. Mari tells her they will always be together, but just then, Juri is hit by a car and fatally injured. Mari pulls the string on the doll herself so that they'll be together in Hell. Shortly after she's taken, Juri dies on her hospital bed.
21	"Paper Balloon Wafting"; Transliteration: "Kamifūsen Fuwari" (Japanese: 紙風船ふわり)	March 3, 2007
A young woman is trying to get back together with her ex-boyfriend for the sake of the child she's carrying. She has the straw doll in case he refuses. Hone Onna's past is shown: Hone Onna was once a young woman named Tsuyu, who was sold into prostitution to cover the debts of her lover. Tsuyu is joined by a younger prostitute named Kiyo. Kiyo feels inferior to Tsuyu and betrays her when they try to run away, resulting in Tsuyu's violent death. Tsuyu becomes Hone Onna when she is infused with the spirits of other betrayed women. In present day, the young lady sends her ex to Hell and attempts to commit suicide. Hone Onna realizes that the spirit of Kiyo, who committed suicide after her lover left her because she was pregnant, has been possessing women and forcing them to kill themselves.
22	"Longing"; Transliteration: "Dōkei" (Japanese: 憧憬)	March 10, 2007
The story is focused on Takuma again, first introduced in Episode 14. Takuma is suspected of having murdered his mother and wounded his father, but has not been arrested due to lack of evidence, since the real culprit, Kakinuma, disappeared. The townspeople ostracize him, deeming him "the devil's child". Takuma meets a young girl, Seri, whose house was torn down to make way for a train station. She intends to have her revenge against one of the people who had ordered her house's destruction, Mr. Hasue. She deliberately gets into a relationship with him, then blackmails him for being involved with a minor. She extorts money from him but his wife sends her to Hell before she is able to leave town with it.
23	"Distrust"; Transliteration: "Fushin" (Japanese: 不信)	March 17, 2007
Mr. Kimiko insults Mr. Narito's singing during choir practice. Narito becomes so enraged by this petty insult that he sends Kimiko to Hell and blames Takuma for his disappearance. The detective for the case, Seiichi Meshiai, is approached by Ms. Yoshizaki, the woman who sent her lover, Kakinuma, to Hell in Episode 14, which resulted in Takuma becoming accused. Yoshizaki tells Meshiai that Takuma had nothing to do with Kakinuma. She later dies in a car crash. Meshiai's sister, Hotaru, believes Takuma is innocent but doesn't believe in the Hell Link. Kikuri sends Hotaru to Enma Ai's realm to prove it's real. Meshiai and Narito enter Takuma's house to find Hotaru but Narito disappears in front of Meshiai—Mrs. Kimiko sent him to Hell for her husband, starting a terrible cycle of revenge.
24	"Chain Reaction"; Transliteration: "Rensa" (Japanese: 連鎖)	March 24, 2007
People are disappearing one after the other in the town of Lovely Hills as the residents send each other to Hell over the most trivial reasons. All of the disappearances are blamed on Takuma. Detective Meshiai goes to the library and reads a book written by Shibata Hajime (from Season 1) about Hell Girl. He then goes to Takuma's house and sees that Takuma doesn't have the Hell brand on his chest, confirming that the boy is innocent. Mr. Tsuyuki, one of the neighbors, attacks Meshiai when Meshiai sees the Hell brand on his chest. Hotaru explores Enma Ai's house and realm; once she realizes Hell Girl is real and Takuma is innocent, Enma Ai brings her back to the mortal world.
25	"Adrift"; Transliteration: "Hōkō" (Japanese: 彷徨)	March 31, 2007
Mr. Tsuyuki and the Hasues from Episode 22 have formed a mob with other townspeople, convinced that they must kill Takuma to keep themselves safe since they're all branded. Hotaru looks for her brother, who is missing. She flees with Takuma when the mob hunts them down. They hide in the mountain but Kikuri leads the mob to them, telling Hell Girl that she did nothing wrong. The mob tries to drown them, but Meshiai escapes and rescues them. While the three are driving away from the town, Meshiai disappears—sent to hell by Mr. Hasue. Broken by the loss of her brother, Hotaru uses Meshiai's laptop to access Hell Link and apologizes to Takuma before typing in his name.
26	"Dyeing Indigo"; Transliteration: "Aizome" (Japanese: あいぞめ)	April 7, 2007
Hotaru sends Takuma to Hell, insisting that this will all stop when Takuma dies. Ai begins to ferry a sobbing Takuma to Hell, knowing he has done nothing wrong. Reminded of her past, she turns the boat back, and reverts to her human self, gravely weakened. She now has no memory of her companions nor her time as Hell Girl. Takuma is almost killed by the townspeople until Ai intervenes. The mob ruthlessly beats her and Ai dies, saying "It's over." The Lord of Hell finally releases her parents' souls. The townspeople abandon Lovely Hills, and all charges against Takuma are dropped. Takuma's father also wakes up. At the end however, a girl is seen receiving a message from Hell Girl, saying her request has been accepted, meaning it's not over.

==== Hell Girl: Three Vessels (Mitsuganae) ====
- Opening theme: Tsukihana (月華, "Moon Flower")
  - Lyrics: Nana Kitade
  - Composition: Velvet Romica
  - Performance: Nana Kitade
- Ending theme: Ichinuke (いちぬけ, lit. "Once through")
  - Lyrics: Hitomi Mieno
  - Composition: Asami Kousei
  - Arrangement: Yasutaka Mizushima
  - Performance: Mamiko Noto
  - Release Date: December 17, 2008

No.	Title	Original release date
1	"The Girl Who Found Herself Robbed"; Transliteration: "Ubawareta Shōjo" (Japanese: 奪われた少女)	October 4, 2008
Ai makes her first appearance as a blue butterfly after her apparent death. Her companions now work as ordinary people. Ai's new companion, a young boy named Yamawaro, calls Ren back to Ai while Kikuri possesses a doll and calls Wanyūdō. Bewildered that Ai has returned, her group take on a case after a long time: a rebellious high school girl, Itsuko Hiraishi, hates her teacher Tange because he records every fault of his students in a notebook, saying he will put it in their permanent record. Ai inhabits the body of Itsuko's friend, Yuzuki Mikage. Itsuko sends Tange to Hell, only to regret her decision upon learning that he was not a cruel teacher: he never wrote anything in his notebook; he only pretended to scare students into behaving.
2	"A Bird in a Cage"; Transliteration: "Kago no Tori" (Japanese: 籠ノ鳥)	October 11, 2008
Yuzuki is troubled by the experience involving Ai, Tange, and Itsuko's recent transfer to a new school. Akira Kitayama, a middle schooler, goes to see a shopkeeper, Mitsuko, with whom he is in love. Akira later sees her husband Seiji beating Mitsuko and wrongly accusing her of seducing Akira. Yuzuki sees visions of Akira accessing the Hell Correspondence website. Akira tries to persuade Mitsuko to leave her husband, but when an angry Seiji attacks both of them, Akira sends him to Hell to save Mitsuko. The next morning however, Akira finds Mitsuko's shop abandoned, as Mitsuko has left, leaving Akira to ponder the consequence of his decision.
3	"Rotten Fruit"; Transliteration: "Kusatta Kajitsu" (Japanese: 腐った果実)	October 18, 2008
Yuzuki and her best friend Akie rescue an idol, Jun Moriyama, from a stalker, and meet a woman, Masako Momota, who asks them to pass an envelope to Jun, containing photos of Jun in provocative outfits of the time before she debuted. Masako had attended the same talent agency as Jun but Jun bullied Masako until she could take no more and left, sacrificing her dream of becoming a singer. Ai's companions wonder if Ai is possessing Yuzuki because she doesn't have a body of her own in the real world. In the present, Masako makes Jun apologize, and demands that Jun vouch for her to debut. Jun refuses, stating that Masako cannot sing. At her concert, Jun attempts to make a public apology to Masako for her bullying, but an enraged Masako sends Jun to Hell.
4	"Big Brother"; Transliteration: "Aniki" (Japanese: 兄貴)	October 25, 2008
Yukawa is constantly bullied by his classmates until one day, he is saved by a stranger named Nishida Shin who knows Kendo. Nishida begins teaching him Kendo, causing him to become more active, outgoing, happy, and cool. He is also no longer bullied. However, one day aboard a bus, a deranged man begins threatening another man for complaining of being hit by the former during a sudden stop, cutting the other man's hair off and dragging him off the bus. Yukawa's image of his hero is shattered when Nishida fails to intervene, supposedly afraid of putting Yukawa in harm's way. He sends Nishida to Hell. Feeling the world cannot change even if he himself changes, Yukawa quits Kendo and reverts to his former timid self.
5	"This Mundane World"; Transliteration: "Utsusemi" (Japanese: うつせみ)	November 1, 2008
Yuzuki accidentally bumps into first-year student, Katase Ririka, causing her to break a beaker. The two of them report the damage to teacher Mio Niiyama, who lets the two off without punishment. The next day, Ririka's grandmother shows up at school and accuses Mio of picking on Ririka and continues to verbally attack her over the phone that night. The situation intensifies as Ririka's grandmother hands out leaflets that defame Mio and says she will keep Ririka home until Mio resigns. Mio tries to get Ririka to clear her name, but Ririka deliberately slanders Mio to her grandmother, meaning Ririka was the cause of her grandmother's drastic actions. Saddened, Mio sends Ririka to Hell.
6	"My Teacher"; Transliteration: "Watashi no Sensei" (Japanese: わたしのセンセイ)	November 8, 2008
Yuuna Serizawa, a third-year student, holds a grudge against Ren, and tries sending him to Hell, but her request is obviously rejected by Ai. Serizawa is infatuated with Hone Onna and sees Ren as a rival. Hone Onna corrects her misunderstanding, offering a band-aid for her injured knee. Yuuna flaunts the same band-aid on her neck, showing off to her classmate, Kira Moroboshi, who bears a similar obsessive affection for Hone Onna. At school, when Moroboshi finds her shoes thrown into a dirty bucket, Serizawa blatantly lies that she did it under Hone Onna's instructions. Enraged, Moroboshi sends Serizawa to Hell. Later, she ironically announces that she is no longer after Hone Onna, but Wanyūdō.
7	"Liar"; Transliteration: "Usotsuki" (Japanese: うそつき)	November 15, 2008
A new boy named Inuo Atsushi has transferred to Yuzuki's school. He claims that he moved from Tokyo because his mom is ill, but in truth, his dad left his mother and, ashamed, the two left Tokyo. Due to the stress of lying and taking care of his ungrateful mother, Inuo frequently visits the Hell Correspondence website, never typing in a name. However, after he reveals the secret to his classmate Washizu and is beaten by his mother for doing so, he finally types in a name. Out of good faith, Washizu spreads news about Inuo's real situation and tries to motivate him to seek help. However, it is revealed that Inuo actually typed in Washizu's name, rather than his abusive mother, for continually meddling with his family business. When Washizu brings Inuo to a bar to show him his mother cheating with another man, Inuo sends Washizu to Hell. Afterward, he becomes insane.
8	"Neighbour"; Transliteration: "Tonari" (Japanese: 隣)	November 22, 2008
Yuzuki returns a lost dog named Momo to her owner Mioi Hatsumi. Hatsumi's older neighbor Shintani shows off her new expensive bracelet but is insulted once she notices the same bracelet is worn by Momo as a collar. Shintani tries to get the apartment management to evict Momo. When this fails, she poisons the dog. Finding out that Shintani poisoned Momo, Hatsumi accesses the Hell website and confronts Shintani on the roof, unable to understand her hatred. Hatsumi ends up nearly falling off the roof. Trying to save herself, she accidentally pulls the string of her straw doll, sending Shintani to Hell, before falling. However, she survives.
9	"Stray Inari Spirit"; Transliteration: "Hagure Inari" (Japanese: はぐれ稲荷)	November 29, 2008
Inao Kaede, a quiet student, claims to be a fortune-teller through a fox spirit she claims resides within her. As she makes a streak of strangely correct predictions (later revealed to be just lucky coincidences), more students begin to give her requests. A shallow student, Nishino, requests that Inao kill a college student she claims is stalking her. Inao reluctantly accepts but no matter what she tries, the 'stalker' lives. Threatened to be exposed as a fake, she resorts to sending him to Hell, only to find out that Nishino lied to her and she'd damned the guy and herself for no reason. Nishino just wanted him dead because she found him gross. The guy had been innocent.
10	"The Goldfish in the Mirror"; Transliteration: "Kagami no Naka no Kingyo" (Japanese: 鏡の中の金魚)	December 6, 2008
A boy named Ichimura Kazuya is a marathon runner. He has a part-time job as a paperboy to support his mother, who loves to buy expensive kimonos. His parents constantly argue, with his father never giving his mother any attention, so his mother uses the money she believes her husband secretly gives her (it is actually Kazuya's money) to buy kimono to hopefully catch his father's eye. Kazuya thinks that it is the salesman Saito's fault that his family is in this state, as Saito flatters his mother excessively so she can buy more kimono from him. He sends Saito to Hell, only to find another salesperson replacing him and pampering his mother with flattery.
11	"Blotted Paper"; Transliteration: "Nijinda pēji" (Japanese: 滲んだ頁)	December 13, 2008
Kamisaka Rokurou is a novelist whose mystery book has received publicity because of real copycat murders resembling its plot, committed by a student. Kamisaka is interviewed by a reporter, Asaba Sumi, but the editor-in-chief changes her manuscript to lies so the magazine will sell more. Asaba apologizes to Kamisaka. The first victim's older sister, Michio Yui, Kamisaka and Asaba meet and decide to each send one person to Hell so they can get rid of three people at once. Michio chooses the murderer Chouchi, Asaba chooses her editor, and Kamisaka chooses his friend. Afterward, Kamisaka is unexpectedly sent to Hell by the murderer's mother, who blames him for her son's crimes.
12	"The Midsummer Chart"; Transliteration: "Manatsu no gurafu" (Japanese: 真夏のグラフ)	December 20, 2008
Nomura Nobuo works part-time at a food stand beside the pool. Every time someone agitates him, he draws them and puts their face up on the model on his calendar chart. The person who reaches the top of the model first will be sent to hell. In the meantime, his manga debuts in a monthly manga book, so he decides not to send anyone to hell since he is in a good mood. It is only when he sees his crush Sasayama Kokoro trying to commit suicide because her boyfriend Ryuu, cheated on her that he decides to send Ryuu to hell. However, Nobuo is sent to hell by Kokoro, who believes that he will spread rumors about what she told him.
13	"Six Coin Lanterns"; Transliteration: "Rokumondōrō" (Japanese: 六文燈籠)	December 28, 2008
A woman named Azusa Mayama is angry that investigator Norihisa, the father of Yuzuki's best friend Akie, halted investigation on her father's accident because it involved the son of a prestigious family. At the lantern festival, Yuzuki sees her reflection at the gate to Hell but Tsugumi Shibata, now a grown woman, warns her that she may not return if she crosses. Yuzuki realizes Akie is in trouble and contacts Norihisa. To get revenge, Azusa sends a man in to rape Akie but Norihisa arrives in time. Ai separates from Yuzuki, receiving back her real body as a festival gift. Yuzuki believes that she is finally free of Hell Girl, but Akie later disappears right in front of her when Azusa sends Akie to Hell. Yuzuki's eyes flicker red as she screams.
14	"The Street Corner of Bitterness"; Transliteration: "Urami no machikado" (Japanese: 怨みの街角)	January 10, 2009
Convenience store worker Tsuzuki helps student Kashiwagi Hidemi after she misses the last train home. Someone posts a picture of them together online, sparking rumors about Kashiwagi's character. Kashiwagi wants to send the person who uploaded the picture to Hell, but Yuzuki tries to persuade her not to. Tsuzuki is arrested for assault and Kashiwagi believes it will worsen her reputation if everyone sees his arrest in the papers. Tsuzuki breaks out of jail and Kashiwagi tells him to stop, but he doesn't recognize her right away. Saddened, she sends him to Hell. Yuzuki later sees a completely changed Kashiwagi, with dyed hair, excessive make up and jewelry (supposedly/estimated, expensive), and piercings. She becomes overwhelmed as she now senses many people around her about to contact Hell Girl.
15	"The Rabbit and the Turtle"; Transliteration: "Usagi to kame" (Japanese: 兎と亀)	January 17, 2009
Shinohara Usagi is a schoolgirl who is always being helped because she is too slow at everything. One day, her classmate Endo asks her to date him. However, Endo is forced to cheat on her by her jealous older brother Michito, and he leaves her, ashamed. Usagi reveals she has accessed the Hell Correspondence, intending to send her brother to hell. Shocked, he reveals that he has done the same. The two have a heartfelt talk about their sufferings. It is implied that Usagi is actually in love with her brother. They drop their straw dolls into the river. However, Usagi realizes Michito will never return her romantic affections so when he leaves, she retrieves the doll from the river and sends her brother to hell.
16	"The Trap of Temptation"; Transliteration: "Yūwaku no wana" (Japanese: 誘惑の罠)	January 24, 2009
Yuzuki senses a man about to pull the string on one of Ai's straw dolls. As she rushes to stop him, Ai tells her that her attempts are futile. She shows Yuzuki the man's future. Instead of socializing with coworkers after work, Naowa has always instead played with a young girl named Kaya because he likes children. He has sent his fellow worker, Nakajima, to hell because of Nakajima's disturbing behavior and inappropriate interest toward Kaya. Nakajima's girlfriend, Yuki, joins their company to investigate. She forms a romantic relationship with Naowa, keeping silent about who she is. One night, Naowa finally reveals he is unworthy of her because he sent Nakajima to Hell. Yuki then reveals her true identity and sends Naowa to hell. Despite seeing this future, Yuzuki still has hope.
17	"Inside the Straw"; Transliteration: "Wara no naka" (Japanese: 藁の中)	January 31, 2009
Upon receiving a request from an elderly woman, Yamawaro begs to be the straw doll. Yuzuki goes to the mansion, asking to speak to the elderly woman but a much younger woman answers the door, leaving Yuzuki confused. Yamawaro explains that in the past, he witnessed the young couple lose their child, Hikaru. After many years, he appeared before the now elderly wife, and the wife believed her son had returned. However the husband, knowing Yamawaro is not human, used him for his experiments to achieve eternal life. When the man feeds the resulting potion to his wife, she regains her youth. However, the wife discovers Yamawaro is being used unethically, and urges him to flee. Now, unable to forgive her husband, she sends him to Hell and commits suicide by exploding the mansion.
18	"Special Radio"; Transliteration: "Supesharuredeio" (Japanese: スペシャルレディオ)	February 7, 2009
Yuzuki listens to a popular late-night radio show. Most of the letters read on the show are from a frequent sender called "Chi-chan." Chi-chan, whose real name is Chiriko, has fallen in love with the DJ host Joutarou and his sweet-talk. She becomes friends with Kaname, another well-known mail sender on the show. Wanting to thank Joutarou, the two go down to the radio station and meet Yume, the scriptwriter. Kaname says that she wants to be a radio writer too and Yume lets her have a script of the broadcast, shocking Chi-chan and making her realize that Joutarou's sweet words were all scripted, crushing her fantasy him. Hating Kaname for crushing this fantasy, she sends her to Hell. Afterward, she returns to her fantasy, refusing to accept that Joutarou's words are scripted.
19	"Snow, Moon and Cherry Blossoms"; Transliteration: "Setsugekka" (Japanese: 雪月花)	February 14, 2009
Kaori Nakiri is the next heiress to the Nakiri school of flower arrangement but despises this predetermined future. Yuzuki recognizes Ai's companions working at the funeral despite being her school's staff. As Yuzuki can see through her companions' magic disguise, Ai realizes Yuzuki will 'awaken' soon. Yukina, the result of the father's affair with another woman, demands that Kaori give her the Nakiri school. Tsukio, Kaori's childhood friend and love, discovers Yukina planning to poison Kaori so as to inherit the land, and drinks the poison in her place. Kaori learns of this and discovers family secrets, including that Tsukio is her brother. Broken, she accepts her role as the family head and sends Yukina to hell. Ai reveals to Yuzuki that she is fated to become the next Hell Girl.
20	"The Hell Professor vs. Hell Girl"; Transliteration: "Jigoku Hakase tai Jigoku Shōjo" (Japanese: 地獄博士 対 地獄少女)	February 21, 2009
An old man named Mizuragi Shōgo types Tsugumi's name into the Hell Correspondence. Each sensing the request, Yuzuki, Ai, and Tsugumi go to his mansion. Shogo explains that he gained interest in Hell after his mother used Ai's services to send his father to Hell. After years of research, he yearned to meet Ai and so had an artificial grudge against Tsugumi planted in his mind through hypnosis in order to feel enough hatred to meet her. The others all protest, as Tsugumi has done no wrong, but luckily, just before Shogo can pull the string to send her to Hell, he is instead sent to Hell by his assistant due to how Shogo took in many orphaned children only to treat them cruelly and try to send them to Hell for his research.
21	"Right in Front Behind You"; Transliteration: "Ushiro no shōmen" (Japanese: うしろの正面)	February 28, 2009
Yuzuki believes she can escape her fate of becoming the next Hell Girl as Tsugumi had. She meets a young boy named Kaito, who is being abused by his stepmother Nanami. Nanami used to treat Kaito with love; however, ever since she became pregnant with a girl she names Mao, Nanami begins to fawn over her and unreasonably punish Kaito. Kaito only desires to return to those earlier days of happiness when Nanami was much kinder. Yuzuki is shocked to realize that Kaito's father is aware of the domestic violence against his son, but refuses to acknowledge it. Believing his son is in the way of their family's happiness, he almost kills Kaito; however, he comes to his senses when Kaito sends Mao to Hell, and Nanami also returns to her old, kind self.
22	"Flower and Moon"; Transliteration: "Hana to tsuki" (Japanese: 華と月)	March 7, 2009
Yuzuki asks Tsugumi for advice on avoiding her fate, but Tsugumi does nothing, believing only Yuzuki can save herself. Sumika is the reserved twin of the famous model and actress Yuika. Yuika is quite cruel to Sumika. Only a birthmark on Sumika's side distinguishes the two. After Yuika injures her arm, she orders Sumika to take her place in a photo shoot. Sumika thrives in the role and enters a relationship with her sister's boyfriend Masato. Yuika's arm heals and the sisters argue over who should continue the role of celebrity. Masato breaks up with one of the sisters (unspecified who), and she sends her twin to Hell. At an event, the place where Sumika's birthmark should be is hidden by her arm, leaving the true identity of the doomed sibling vague, though it could be Yuika.
23	"Twilight Hills"; Transliteration: "Higure zaka" (Japanese: 日暮れ坂)	March 14, 2009
Fumio Mizuhara is bullied by Tomohide Matsuda because Fumio is from a rich family while Tomohide is poor. Tomohide overhears that Fumio is going to the high school that Tomohide wanted to attend. He feels unfortunate, as he has to enter work instead of attending high school to support his mother and sister. The mark of Hell is seen on Tomohide's chest and it is suggested that he sent his abusive father to Hell. When Tomohide physically assaults Fumio, Fumio sends him to Hell out of desperation. Ai appears to Yuzuki, who senses people about to send someone to Hell again. Yuzuki wants Ai to leave her alone but when Ai reveals her hidden desire to send Ai to Hell, Yuzuki flees, unable to face the possibility that she too has been consumed by hatred.
24	"Mayfly"; Transliteration: "Kagerō" (Japanese: 蜉蝣)	March 21, 2009
Yuzuki realizes that suddenly, nobody in her school or town knows who she is. Only Tsugumi still recognizes her. Tsugumi reveals that she was never fated to become Hell Girl like Yuzuki had thought. She has given up hope of stopping the cycle of hatred like her father, Hajime. She tells Yuzuki she must accept that this system exists, and concludes that Yuzuki is not a person of this world after realizing that up until now, her life had been an illusion. Yuzuki refuses to believe this and flees. She finds her apartment in a decayed state, with a corpse of a girl on the floor. Ai Enma and her companions appear, revealing that she had actually died a long time ago.
25	"Yuzuki"; Transliteration: "Yuzuki" (Japanese: ゆずき)	March 28, 2009
Ai shows Yuzuki her childhood. As a little girl, Yuzuki lived happily with her parents, until her father, a bus driver, died in a bus crash due to faulty brakes. The town accused the Mikage family of murder. Yuzuki's mother fell ill and the doctor refused to see her due to the stigmatization. With her mother close to death and Yuzuki starving, her mother planned to kill her so Yuzuki wouldn't suffer. However, she died in her sleep, and Yuzuki buried her mother, her eyes turning red. She died embracing the teddy bear her father gave her. The older Yuzuki now realises the corpse is hers. Angry that the world abandoned her, she accepts her fate as Hell Girl. Akie returns as Yuzuki's aid. A request with Azusa's name comes in—Yuzuki's first summoning as Hell Girl.
26	"The Path Left by a Soul"; Transliteration: "Tamashii no kiseki" (Japanese: 魂の軌跡)	April 4, 2009
Akie's father Takasugi wants to send Azusa to Hell because she sent his daughter Akie to Hell. Yuzuki pushes him to do so but Takasugi backs out. Angered, Yuzuki decides to send Azusa to Hell herself, breaking the rules. The Lord of Hell is about to send Yuzuki to Hell as punishment, but Ai and her companions save her. Ai shows her the truth: Takasugi saw Azusa taking care of her paralyzed father, who would have no one to help him if Azusa was sent to Hell. Yuzuki breaks down. The Lord of Hell says that as punishment, Ai will have to be Hell Girl for eternity. Ai accepts and reveals her sad past to Yuzuki through a kiss, saying that she sees herself in Yuzuki, whose soul is finally freed. During the credits, Azusa stabs Tsujinobashi's son at the airport before suddenly disappearing. Takasugi's servant Haruko sent Azusa to Hell for Akie.

==== Hell Girl: The Fourth Twilight (Yoi no Togi) ====
- Opening theme: Noise (ノイズ)
  - Performance: Mio Yamazaki
- Ending theme: Irogami (いろがみ, lit. "Colored Paper")
  - Performance: Mamiko Noto

No.	Title	Original release date
1	"Can't Be Seen, Can't Be Heard"; Transliteration: "Mienai Kikoenai" (Japanese: 見えない聞こえない)	July 14, 2017
Mayama Shizuka is relentlessly bullied by her classmates in her class' group chat. She befriends a loner from her class, Yukawa Asano. Asano creates a group chat for them and a loner from the next class, Yokota. Shizuka discovers that the perpetrator of the bullying was in fact Asano. Asano confesses that she started it because Shizuka's pushover manner annoyed her. Angry and believing Asano acted as both herself and Yokota in the chat to fool her, Shizuka sends Asano to Hell. Afterward, she gets a message from Yokota, realizing Yokota is in fact a real person. Amidst this, Ai sees a mysterious young girl, who says that what Ai does is wrong.
2	"There's Only You"; Transliteration: "Anata Shika Inai" (Japanese: あなたしかいない)	July 21, 2017
Haru & Nanako are a comedy duo. In public, Nanako is the leader and Haru the goofball, but in reality, Haru is the dominant leader while Nanako her naive follower. As they become successful, Haru begins to get annoyed at Nanako's dependence and physically strikes her at one point. Eventually, she suggests they split, as their assigned roles have become burdensome to her. Heartbroken, Nanako knows Haru has given up in her life, and reveals the straw doll from Ai; Haru smiles, realizing Nanako understands her. Nanako sends Haru to Hell, promising to join her soon. Meanwhile, Ai asks for the mysterious girl's name but the girl does not remember her identity.
3	"Someday, Somebody Will..."; Transliteration: "Itsuka, Dareka ga..." (Japanese: いつか誰かが…)	July 28, 2017
The Nagatas are a dysfunctional family of disturbed individuals. Both parents are neglectful and selfish, while the oldest daughter Asuka is a bully. Only the two younger children, a boy Akira and a girl Arina, are decent. However, Akira cannot go through with Ai's contract, afraid to go to Hell. The children's older cousin, Yoshinori, proves to be the worst by far, as he is a violent psychopath who is implied to be involved with his cousin Asuka and tries to molest his youngest cousin Arina as soon as he moves with them. After Yoshinori rapes Arina, Akira is finally pushed to the edge. He meets with Mikami, Asuka's bully victim, and together, they send Asuka and Yoshinori to Hell. Afterward, Akira and Mikami become a serial killer duo, murdering people who victimize others. Akira states he is doing so to save people like his sister Arina.
4	"Bury Me Deep"; Transliteration: "Watashi wo Fukaku Umete" (Japanese: わたしを深く埋めて)	August 4, 2017
Sakura Kubota lives in a nursing home that seems idyllic on the surface; however, the caretakers are abusive to the residents. Tsugumi Shibata is now working there. She still has visions of Ai, and can see the mysterious young girl. Sakura wants to send Yanohara, the director of the facility, to Hell, for pretending she doesn't see what's going on. Wanyuudou gets to know Sakura better until she loses her memory of him, her condition deteriorating. Yanohara learns that Sakura documents the abuse in a journal, and beats her, though she is unable to find it: Sakura has buried the journal under a tree. Suffering, Sakura finally remembers Wanyuudou, and sends Yanohara to Hell.
5	"I Can Hear the Song of the Wind"; Transliteration: "Kaze no Uta ga Kikoeru" (Japanese: 風の歌が聞こえる)	August 11, 2017
The mysterious young girl finally remembers her name: Michiru. At a funeral for three young boys, Satoshi Kazama and his family try to attend but are screamed at to leave. Satoshi's father had been driving the sons of three other families. The other sons bully Satoshi, and ride without their seatbelts, which causes the car gets into an accident, resulting in the three boys die, while only Satoshi and his parents survive. Michiru's past is shown: Eisaku, the son of the landlord, and his friends try to drown Michiru. All of them fall into the lake and Michiru is the only one who survives. In the present, Michiru protests to Ai about the fact that the mother of one of the dead boys wants to send Satoshi, who is an innocent kid, to Hell. In the past, Michiru's family is persecuted for the three boys' deaths, the townspeople believing Michiru drowned them. Michiru is locked in a storeroom by the landlord, where she is starved and dehydrated for ten days. When her parents find her, the townspeople trap the family and set the storeroom on fire, killing them. The mother that wished to send Satoshi to Hell does not go through with the contract. Ai shows Michiru that she had not remembered everything. As she burned, Michiru's grudge became a curse that set her murderers and the entire town ablaze, committing an unforgivable sin. Ai tells her she must atone as Hell Girl.
6	"Twill"; Transliteration: "Ayaori" (Japanese: あやおり)	August 18, 2017
Michiru refuses her fate to be Hell Girl, and tries to disappear. However, her spirit goes to where she first met Yamawaro, and Ai's companions are waiting there. Accusing Ai of bringing her there, she is informed that it was actually the Lord of Hell who arranged everything. Michiru says that she's never seen him before, and tries to run away again, to which Ai's companions comment that she won't be able to run away forever, as there's only one way to exit. Meanwhile, the client in question is Yui Aihara, who seems to be living a good life with her boyfriend, Tetsuya Yoshioka, who has the Hell mark on his chest, indicating that he's sent someone to Hell before. She keeps visiting the Hell Correspondence and writing "Soon", but never submits a name. Tetsuya proposes to Yui, but she isn't completely happy, as seen by the fact that her father is in the hospital after being attacked by some drunk men when he was working delivering food. It is revealed that Yui purposefully got close to Tetsuya (because she recognized him from the trial) to get more information about what happened. Tetsuya tells her what happened that day, and that while he and four other men were drunk, two of them attacked Yui's father. He tried to stop them, and they paid him no heed, and the leader was Kazuomi Kogure, the current president of the company they both work at, and the man who confessed was just an acquaintance of Kazuomi, who was paid to take the fall by Kazuomi's father. While Yui tries to access the Hell Correspondence, Tetsuya takes the phone away from her because he doesn't want her to go to Hell too, and explains to her that he sent the other man involved in the beating of her father, Suzumura, to Hell, because Suzumura raped his sister, who hung herself and explained everything to Tetsuya in a note. Because of that, he sent Suzumura to Hell, and as he doesn't want Yui to have to go to Hell like he will one day. He tells her he will go to the police the next day so that Kazuomi can face legal punishment. Yui ends up going to Hell Correspondence anyway, and instead of Ai, it is Michiru who shows up as Hell Girl, and Yamawaro becomes the straw doll for her. At the very end, Michiru seems to be at peace with the fact that she is now Hell Girl, and when Satoshi (from the previous episode) tries to put his own name in the Hell Correspondence, she tells him to be strong at they'll meet in Heaven. Ai and her companions reflect over what has happened, with Hone-Onna and Ren joking that Yamawaro has "dumped" Kikuri for Michiru.
7	"Reminiscence: The Tarnished Mound"; Transliteration: "Kaikoroku: Yogoreta Maundo" (Japanese: 回顧録: 汚れたマウンド)	August 25, 2017
High school baseball player Daisuke Iwashita's friend and teammate Shinichi Muroi is being bullied by their team's ace pitcher, Mamoru Hanagasa. After Shinichi dies from injuries inflicted by Mamoru, Daisuke is framed for the murder and the town turns against him. In desperation, Daisuke accesses the Hell Link. He gives Mamoru a chance to confess but when Mamoru laughs him off, he sends Mamoru to Hell. Shinichi's death avenged, Daisuke moves to another town to start over, knowing his soul belongs to Hell after he dies. (Identical to Season 1 Episode 3)
8	"Reminiscence: Early Afternoon Window"; Transliteration: "Kaikoroku: Hirusagari no Mado" (Japanese: 回顧録: 昼下がりの窓)	September 1, 2017
Keiko Yasuda witnesses her neighbor, Namiko Todaka, committing adultery while walking past Todaka's house one afternoon. Knowing this, Namiko constantly harasses Keiko so that the latter would keep what she saw to herself. Namiko also encourages her daughter, Yuria, to bully Haruka, Keiko's daughter, at school. Haruka seeks revenge against Namiko after watching her mother constantly suffer and after having suffered under Yuria's bullying as well. (Identical to Season 1 Episode 6)
9	"Reminiscence: Spilled Bits"; Transliteration: "Kaikoroku: Koboreta Kakeratachi" (Japanese: 回顧録: 零れたカケラ達)	September 8, 2017
Akane Sawai becomes a hikikomori due to depression; she only interacts with her textmate, whom she met online. Her concerned teacher, Yoshiki Fukasawa, constantly visits her to try to convince her to return to school. Akane gets irritated by this and decides to send Fukasawa to Hell but later finds out her textmate is Fukasawa. They are both depressed and tired of life. Looking for an end, Fukasawa convinces Akane to send him to Hell. In Hell, when Fukasawa learns Akane will also go to Hell when she dies, he feels regret but hears Akane, who is strangely at peace with the idea of going there, tell him to wait for her. (Identical to Season 1 Episode 12)
10	"Reminiscence: Black Rut"; Transliteration: "Kaikoroku: Kuro no Wadachi" (Japanese: 回顧録: 黒の轍)	September 15, 2017
A new road needs to be built to stop the traffic accidents in the area but is blocked by a house, occupied by an old man who refuses to move. After a young boy died at the road, his older brother, truck driver Michiro Ito, wants vengeance from the old man. He picks up one of Ai's companions, Wanyuudou, who is there to assess the situation, as Ito had summoned Hell Girl to send the old man to Hell. His request is annulled when the old man already dies. Ito doesn't believe it and goes to ram his truck into the man's house. He nearly gets into the same accident as his brother—Wanyuudou, reminded of his past, saves him. Hone Onna hands Ito the old man's will: he has left his land to Ito's family due to guilt over Ito's brother's death. During this episode, Wanyuudou's past is explained. (Identical to Season 2 Episode 12)
11	"Reminiscence: A Bird in a Cage"; Transliteration: "Kaikoroku: Kago no Tori" (Japanese: 回顧録: 籠ノ鳥)	September 22, 2017
Yuzuki continues to be troubled by the experience involving Ai, Tange, and Itsuko's recent transfer to a new school. On her way home, Yuzuki passes by Akira Kitayama, a middle schooler, who is rushing to an electronic appliance store in order to see the shopkeeper, a middle-aged woman named Mitsuko, with whom he is in love unbeknown to her. Their conversation is cut short when her husband appears in the doorway, furious. Akira later sees him beating Mitsuko and wrongly accusing her of romantic involvement with Akira. That night and the next, Yuzuki receives a vision of Akira accessing the Hell Correspondence website twice, a second time due to not having known the husband's first name, Seiji. He later consults Yuzuki about Seiji's abusive actions towards Mitsuko. Yuzuki suggests that he tell Mitsuko to cut her connections with Seiji. The next day, Akira tries persuade Mitsuko to leave her husband, and he prevents her from answering the phone. An angry Seiji appears and attacks both of them. Akira sends him to hell. Mitsuko tells Akira to come to the store the next morning; however, Akira finds the shop abandoned. He finds under the phone a photo of one of the couple's happy memories together. The phone rings. (Identical to Season 3 Episode 2)
12	"Reminiscence: Stray Inari Spirit"; Transliteration: "Kaikoroku: Hagure Inari" (Japanese: 回顧録: はぐれ稲荷)	September 29, 2017
A low-profile girl named Inao Kaede claims to be a fortune-teller, telling fortunes by contacting Gon, a spirit by playing Spirit of the Coin, a fox spirit that she claims resides within her. As she begins to build her reputation with a continuous streak of correct predictions, more students begin to ask her to perform tasks, for example cursing the school counselor. Inao reluctantly accepted these requests due to fear of losing the never before gained attention. At the sign of her continued success, a female student named Nishino apologizes to Inao for previously making fun of her fortune telling and requests she kill a college student who she claims is stalking her every day. Eventually Inao reluctantly accepts the request. No matter what she tries over the next few days, the 'stalker' still lives. Threatened to be exposed as a fake, she finally resorts to using the Hell Correspondence website. She pulls the string and sends him to Hell, only to find out the next day that Nishino lied to her, and only wanted him dead because she thought he was disgusting. (Identical to Season 3 Episode 9)

=== Live action ===
==== Hell Girl ====
No.	Title	Original release date
1	"Cracked Time"; Transliteration: "Hibiwareta Jikan" (Japanese: ひび割れた時間)	November 4, 2006
Yu Miyazuki is relentlessly bullied by Rina Endou after being accepted into a university. Yu Miyazuki decides to use the "Hell Correspondence" website and types in Rina Endou's name, but decides not to submit it. The next day, Yu Miyazuki is forced by Rina Endou and her gang to shoplift, where she is almost caught, and again she types her name but does not submit it. As punishment for failing to shoplift, Rina Endou forces Yu Miyazuki onto an older male and takes a picture of them. Yu Miyazuki runs away and tries to kill herself running in front of a truck but is saved by Ai Enma, who gives her a doll. Yu Miyazuki's university application is denied after Rina Endou shows off the pictures and tells her teachers that Yu Miyazuki was the shoplifter. Yu Miyazuki then sends Rina Endou to Hell when she refuses to admit to what she did and breaks her father's watch, and finds out that Rina Endou bullied Yu Miyazuki because she got into the university and not her. Despite this, Yu Miyazuki decides to try for the university again.
2	"The Boy in the Box"; Transliteration: "Hako no Naka no Shōnen" (Japanese: 箱の中の少年)	November 11, 2006
Daichi Nizushima is a young boy who has locked himself in his bedroom. After his father's death, Makoto Shinoda, a manager for the company his father worked at, tells Daichi Nizushima's sister, Ayaka Nizushima, that he believes it is Daichi Nizushima's fault because he does not come out of his room. Daichi Nizushima decides to access the "Hell Correspondence" website and types in Makoto Shinoda's name before being given the straw doll. Daichi Nizushima leaves his room and gives Ayaka Nizushima evidence that Makoto Shinoda might have contributed to their father's death, but Ayaka Nizushima is chased down and falls down a flight of stairs. Daichi Nizushima looks at his father's blog and realizes that he committed suicide because he was given too much work to finish and is computer illiterate, and was harassed by Makoto Shinoda for this. After finding out about Ayaka Nizushima's injury, Daichi Nizushima pulls the string and sends Makoto Shinoda to Hell. The next day, Daichi Nizushima tears down the cardboard on his window and decides it is finally time to see the outside world.
3	"A Baby's Dream"; Transliteration: "Midorigo no Yume" (Japanese: 嬰児の夢)	November 18, 2006
A young mother-to-be named Shoko has already had two abortions, but still wants to have children with her lover, Seichi Toriumi, who works as her manager. He says that he plans to divorce his wife, Mari, but said that his wife must not know about Shoko's pregnancy. Shoko types Mari's name into Hell Correspondence, but decides against it and aborts the baby. A few days later, Shoko sees Seichi at the store with a pregnant Mari and their daughter, despite the fact that Seichi said that he has not touched his wife in years. Devastated, Shoko attempts to call Seichi but speaks with his wife about this; Mari does not believe her. As Shoko showers, she feels pain in her womb and is told by her doctor to give up on ever having children now. Knowing her relationship was a lie, Shoko contacts the "Hell Correspondence" website and sends Seichi's name. When she is malaka not given an immediate response, she attempts to commit suicide. Ai brings her to her world where she is saved, and gives her the straw doll. Shoko pulls the string and sends her lover to Hell. Later, Shoko prays for her baby and Enma Ai's assistants say that they can never meet.
4	"Dusk"; Transliteration: "Ōma no Migiri" (Japanese: 逢魔の砌)	November 25, 2006
Shibata Tsugumi wakes up from a nightmare and is later tucked in by her father, Shibata Hajime. Nakashima Kenta accesses the "Hell Correspondence" website and types Katsuragi Yoshitaka after having a flashback about a car accident. Next morning, Shibata Hajime meets with Asou Mari, who he's blackmailing. He later meets up with his editor, Inagaki, who has him investigate a car accident where a student died. Shibata Hajime sees Katsuragi Yoshitaka, the owner of the car, asking for donations then advises Asou Mari, who was in the car during the accident, to sever ties with Katsuragi Yoshitaka but she roughly shoves him out of her car. She disappears seconds later. As Shibata Hajime discusses what he'd witnessed with a friend, they are interrupted by Shibata Tsugumi and they walk home together. Shibata Tsugumi has a vision of Nakashima Kenta accepting a straw doll from Enma Ai and describes the doll. Shibata Hajime later accesses the "Hell Correspondence" website but thinks it's a hoax. The next day, Shibata Hajime sees Nakashima Kenta about to pull the string and stopped him. They discuss the accident and the "Hell Correspondence" website and Shibata Hajime goes to call Inagaki. He tells him to drop the investigation and Nakashima Kenta sends Katsuragi Yoshitaka to Hell after confronting him. Shibata Hajime sees Katsuragi Yoshitaka disappear.
5	"The Epitaph of Lies"; Transliteration: "Itsuwari no Bohimei" (Japanese: 偽りの墓碑銘)	December 2, 2006
Shibata Tsugumi has a vision of a young woman with a straw doll running from a man with a knife. Enma Ai and Wanyuudo are by a grave in the forest as the doll disappears and a hand shoots up from the grave. A trapped young woman named Misato Honda accesses the site just before a man comes into the room. In the morning, Shibata Tsugumi has another vision of Enma Ai giving the trapped woman a doll; she sees a church in Hachiouji. Inagaki and Shibata Hajime briefly talk before they are told to watch the news about the forest grave. Shibata Tsugumi calls her father about her latest vision but says that he was busy. Shibata Tsugumi angrily ends the call and goes to Hachiouji. Shibata Hajime went to the forest grave and discuss the murder with the inspector before recalling Shibata Tsugumi's first vision and calls her. Shibata Tsugumi, meanwhile, finds a room full of blood before being discovered by the killer Satoshi Abe. She is thrown into the room with Misato Honda and Satoshi Abe, obsessed with having sisters, comes in, forces them to eat peaches and knocks the doll off a high shelf. Misato Honda reaches for the doll. Shibata Tsugumi bites Satoshi Abe and he returns with a knife as Shibata Hajime finds the house. The men fight for the knife and Misato Honda pulls the string as Satoshi Abe prepares to stab Shibata Tsugumi. Shibata Tsugumi feels Enma Ai's presence before Satoshi Abe disappears. The police later rescue the three.
6	"The Red Thread of Promise"; Transliteration: "Yakusoku no Akai Ito" (Japanese: 約束の赤い糸)	December 9, 2006
A young schoolgirl, Sachi Sanada, is seen entering the name "Mako" on the "Hell Correspondence" website and submitting it. Her phone immediately rings, and it is Mako, saying that she knows that Sachi Sanada has cursed her. Mako is a girl who lives at an abandoned warehouse, who saved Sachi Sanada as a young child by killing her tutor who was sexually abusing her by pushing him down a flight of stairs. Mako made "Red Thread" bracelets to promise they would be friends forever, but Mako proves to be more mean then loyal. When Mako destroys Sachi Sanada's bedroom, accuses her crush, Minegi, of rape and almost kills him by pushing him down a long flight of steps, Sachi Sanada pulls the string on the straw doll. It is then revealed that Mako and Sachi Sanada are the same person, with Mako being another personality that Sachi Sanada created due to her abuse and started treating Sachi Sanada cruelly because she was afraid that Minegi's presence in Sachi Sanada's life would make her disappear. Mako's half is sent to Hell while Sachi Sanada remains in the mortal world, to struggle through life alone.
7	"A Promising Temptation"; Transliteration: "Amai Yūwaku" (Japanese: 甘い誘惑)	December 16, 2006
Shibata Tsugumi senses Enma Ai during the wedding reception of Shibata Hajime's co-worker, Miharu Koyama, and it is announced that the bride's father is also engaged. When Miharu Koyama comes back from her honeymoon, she discovers that her father was conned by his fiancee, Kiriko Matsui. Miharu Koyama's parents-in-law also want the marriage nullified due to her father. She confronts Kiriko Matsui that night but she drives off after insulting her father. Miharu Koyama receives a straw doll and Shibata Tsugumi has a vision of it. Miharu Koyama tells Shibata Hajime about Kiriko Matsui and he takes the doll to keep her from condemning herself. He throws it away and Shibata Hajime and Shibata Tsugumi have another fight as they have different opinions about "Hell Girl." Miharu Koyama returns home, finds out that they could lose the house and gets into a fight with her father. That night, Enma Ai returns the doll to her and learns from her ex-husband that her father is begging him to get back together with her. Miharu Koyama later tells Shibata Hajime and Shibata Tsugumi that she didn't pull the string and that everything was turning out fine. Her father, however, sees Kiriko Matsui with another man and she pretends not to know him; causing him to jump off a building. After the memorial service, Miharu Koyama accesses the "Hell Correspondence" website once more.
8	"Miracle of Christmas Eve"; Transliteration: "Seiya no Kiseki" (Japanese: 聖夜の奇跡)	December 23, 2006
Near Christmas, Shibata Tsugumi has a vision of Enma Ai walking down the street and going into a bookstore. Shibata Hajime goes to the same store and finds a 50-year-old book with a story called "Descend into Hell." As he reads the story, he sees similarities to "Hell Girl" and finds the publisher of the book and gets the address of the writer, Ryusei Kitagawa. Shibata Hajime goes to meet the writer but Ryusei Kitagawa refuses to talk. He recalls a conversation with the publisher about a serial rape-murder case from 50 years ago, where Ryusei Kitagawa's wife Fumiko was a victim; it was the same as the story. He meets with his inspector friend and he said that the suspect Ryunosuke Muroi disappeared in front of the police sent to arrest him. He returns to speak to Ryusei Kitagawa but the older man has a heart attack. After recovering, Ryusei Kitagawa was, at first, uncooperative but later told him his story and shows him what he's been working on for the past 50 years, paintings of Enma Ai. The largest painting starts crying as Ryusei Kitagawa dies and is brought to Hell by Enma Ai, whom he greeted like an old friend, and she gave him a small smile. Shibata Hajime walks to his friend's restaurant, where he was supposed to spend Christmas with him and Shibata Tsugumi, and finds that they waited for him.
9	"Compensation for Lying"; Transliteration: "Nise no Daishō" (Japanese: 偽の代償)	January 6, 2007
Kanejo Natsuko and her friends meet at a restaurant and discuss the reason why she hasn't been going back to school. On the way home, Kanejo Natsuko encounters her teacher, Shinji Onda, but Kanejo Natsuko runs away. In her room, she accesses the "Hell Correspondence" website to get rid of her stalker, Shinji Onda. After a confrontation with Kanejo Natsuko, Shinji Onda speak with Shibata Hajime, who's working on the sexual harassment case on campus. Shinji Onda says that he was set up by Kanejo Natsuko and he lost his job and his family. The article was published and Natsuko feels the public backlash. As she was about to pull the string, Shinji Onda visits and says he will take the matter to court. Inside the house, he was once again set up by Kanejo Natsuko and is arrested. Shinji Onda's son, Takuto Onda, starts to suspect Kanejo Natsuko and follows her around. He reveals that he contacted "Hell Girl" to send her to Hell if she didn't tell the truth. They fight over the doll and Kanejo Natsuko's own doll falls out of her bag. They pull the string at the same time. It is revealed during Kanejo Natsuko's punishment that her doll was a fake. Shinji Onda is freed and Shibata Hajime discovers the mark on Takuto Onda, who regrets nothing.
10	"Memories of Sadness"; Transliteration: "Kanashimi no Kioku" (Japanese: 悲しみの記憶)	January 13, 2007
Kyoko Kazama threatens the hospital staff with a straw doll but is steadily losing her memories. Toshihime Honda, a nurse and a doctor, who did not help the daughter after cardiac arrest, plan to do something about the doll as Kyoko Kazama may have overheard Toshihime Honda's tactless disregard for her daughter's life. Toshihime Honda helps around the house to look for the doll and steals money as well. Enma Ai speaks with Wanyuudo about their client as the mother barges into the room and mistakes Enma Ai for her daughter. The father comes home from work and Kyoko Kazama tells him about her day only for him to get angry. She goes through the notebook she writes everything in and sees a reference to the "Hell Correspondence" website. She accesses the site but it doesn't appear. Kyoko Kazama asks Enma Ai to pretend to be her daughter when she realizes that she is dead. Toshihime Honda finds the doll in the daughter's room and Kyoko Kazama confronts her. Toshihime Honda steals the notebook and the doll after taunting her. Enma Ai takes back the doll and returns it to Kyoko Kazama after giving her back her memories. In grief and anger, she pulls the string. Kyoko Kazama loses all her memories soon after.
11	"Darkness of the Known World, Part. 1"; Transliteration: "Utushiyo no Yami" (Japanese: 現し世の闇 前編)	January 20, 2007
Shibata Tsugumi remembers her mother, who disappeared 5 years ago, while Enma Ai is in a room with a picture of the Shibata's family with Shibata Hajime crossed out. Shibata Hajime, because of the inspector's visit, investigates Wakatsuki Junichiro and the Natsume Group. Shibata Tsugumi has a vision of the Group beating him up for snooping around. As Wakatsuki Junichiro is about to shoot Shibata Hajime, someone sent him to Hell and Enma Ai has Ren impersonate Wakatsuki Junichiro to save Shibata Hajime. To make up for worrying Shibata Tsugumi, Shibata Hajime plans to take her to the beach but later learns that she's been kidnapped and her bag is left in front of Tetsu's restaurant. He contacts the police who tell him that the Natsume Group aren't involved and asks if his missing wife, Ayumi, might be the kidnapper. Shibata Hajime storms off and meets Enma Ai, who shows him the room. Shibata Hajime realizes that Ayumi's disappearance and Shibata Tsugumi's kidnapping are connected. That night, he receives a video of Shibata Tsugumi that says she will be killed tomorrow at sunset. He accesses the "Hell Correspondence" website and stares at the screen.
12	"Darkness of the Known World, Part. 2"; Transliteration: "Utushiyo no Yami" (Japanese: 現し世の闇 後編)	January 27, 2007
Shibata Hajime is brought to Enma Ai's world where she shows him the day Ayumi disappeared. Enma Ai hands him a doll but reminds him that even if the kidnapper is sent to Hell, Shibata Tsugumi is still missing and he hesitates. The inspector then tells him that Shibata Tsugumi might have been kidnapped because of an article concerning Sawazaki someone wrote using Shibata Hajime's name 6 years ago. He also tells him that Inagaki had a debt with the Natsume Group. Shibata Hajime runs into the office and punches Inagaki, who reveals that he wrote the article. Inagaki then tells him that Sawazaki's wife was Nishi, Tetsu's older sister. Testu calls Shibata Hajime and tells him why he kidnapped Shibata Tsugumi. Shibata Hajime meets Enma Ai in front of Testu's restaurant and shows him that Testu was the one who sent Ayumi to Hell. Enma Ai and her assistants confront Shibata Hajime and offer him a doll again. He takes it, is transported to Testu's hideout and sees Shibata Tsugumi not moving. Enma Ai appears before the two men and shows Tetsu Inagaki's deal with Wakatsuki and Shibata Hajime's confrontation about the article. Shibata Hajime takes out the doll and returns it to Enma Ai after seeing the pain Tetsu is in. However, Tetsu takes the doll and sends himself to Hell. Shibata Tsugumi, who's alive, and Shibata Hajime, who's cursed, go home. Meanwhile, the inspector says that the Natsume Group is dissolved and loosens his tie and reveals the mark. Enma Ai continues to send people to Hell.
