= Kanae Oki =

Japanese voice actress (born 1984)

- 沖 佳苗
- Born: July 20, 1984 (age 42); Kochi, Japan
- Occupation: Voice actress
- Years active: 1996-present

Kanae Oki (Japanese: 沖 佳苗, Hepburn: Oki Kanae; born July 20, 1984) is a Japanese voice actress. She has had several starring roles in anime shows such as Love Momozono/Cure Peach in Fresh Pretty Cure!, Aki Yamamoto in Yes! PreCure 5, Hazuki Makino in Loups=Garous, Akie Takasugi in Hell Girl: Three Vessels, Minamo Aoi in Real Drive. She also voiced Jacqueline du Pré in Soul Eater.

== Filmography ==
=== Anime ===
List of voice performances in anime
Year	Title	Role	Notes	Source
2006	Futari wa Pretty Cure Splash Star	Various characters		
2006	Digimon Savers	Reporter		
2006	Air Gear	Schoolgirl		
2006	Katekyo Hitman Reborn!'	Various characters		
2006	Hataraki Man	Bookshop employee		
2007	Saint October	Kazu, Tin		
2007	Yes! PreCure 5	Aki Yamamoto		
2008	Kamen Rider Kiva	Octopus Fangire オクトパスファンガイア	Ep. 2	
2008	Yes! PreCure 5 GoGo!	Miyu		
2008	Soul Eater	Jacqueline O. Lantern Dupré		
2008	Real Drive	Minamo Aoi		
2008	Library War	Various characters		
2008	Slayers Revolution	Girl		
2008	Casshern Sins	Various characters		
2008	Hell Girl: Three Vessels	Akie Takasugi		
2009	Maria-sama ga Miteru	Student	season 4	
2009	White Album	Assistant		
2009	Genji Monogatari Sennenki	Dog 犬君		
2009	Fresh Pretty Cure!	Love Momozono / Cure Peach		
2009	Mainichi Kaasan	Cousin older sister いとこ姉		
2009	Gokujō!! Mecha Mote Iinchō	Mamoru Uemura 上村真衣		
2009	Sweet Blue Flowers	Kaori Ueno		
2009	Soreike! Anpanman	Tekkanokomakichan 鉄火のコマキちゃん		
2009	Anyamaru Tantei Kiruminzuu	Female college student		
2009	Kimi ni Todoke	Shino		
2010	Durarara!!	Kasuka Heiwajima (young)		
2010	Tensou Sentai Goseiger	AntiYuumajuu Pikarime of the Shakokidogu 遮光器土偶のピカリ眼	Ep. 28	
2010	The Legend of the Legendary Heroes	Girl's voice		
2010	Pokémon	Narissa		
2010–12	Digimon Fusion	Yu Amano		
2011	Sengoku Otome: Momoiro Paradox	Motochika Chōsokabe		
2012	Beyblade: Shogun Steel	Ren Kurenai		
2012	La storia della Arcana Famiglia	Liberta (young)		
2012	Love, Chunibyo & Other Delusions	Kimera, student		
2012	Medaka Box Abnormal	Hirado Royal 平戸ロイヤル		
2014	Noragami	Passerby		
2014	Super Sonico the Animation	Arco, manager アーコ / 店長		
2014	Love, Chunibyo & Other Delusions! Love	Kimera, student		
2014	The Irregular at Magic High School	Akane Kasuga		
2014	Soul Eater Not!	Jacqueline O Lantern Dupre		
2014	Gonna be the Twin-Tail!!	Female announcer		
2014	Cardfight!! Vanguard G	Child		
2015	Prison School	Girl, teacher		
2015	Peanuts Snoopy short anime PEANUTS スヌーピー -ショートアニメ-	Shroeder		
2016	Assassination Classroom	Child	season 2	
2016	Pandora in the Crimson Shell: Ghost Urn	China チャイナ		
2016	Seisen Cerberus	Amo, Maritta アモ / マリッタ		
2016	Kabaneri of the Iron Fortress	Kajika		
2016	Time Travel Girl	Elizabeth		
2016	All Out!!	Risa Yasaka		
2017	ACCA: 13-Territory Inspection Dept.	Passer パッサー		
2018	Hug! PreCure	Love Momozono / Cure Peach	Ep. 36-37	
	Soreike! Anpanman	Komaki with iron fire 鉄火のコマキちゃん		

=== Films ===
List of voice performances in film
Year	Title	Role	Notes	Source
2009	Pretty Cure All Stars DX: Everyone's Friends☆the Collection of Miracles!	Love Momozono / Cure Peach		
2009	Fresh Pretty Cure! The Kingdom of Toys has Lots of Secrets!?	Love Momozono / Cure Peach		
2010	Pretty Cure All Stars DX2: Light of Hope - Protect the Rainbow Jewel!	Love Momozono / Cure Peach		
2010	Loups=Garous	Hazuki Makino		
2011	Pretty Cure All Stars DX3: Deliver the Future! The Rainbow-Colored Flower That Connects the World	Love Momozono / Cure Peach		
2012	Pretty Cure All Stars New Stage: Friends of the Future	Love Momozono / Cure Peach		
2014	Pretty Cure All Stars New Stage 3: Eternal Friends	Love Momozono / Cure Peach		
2015	Pretty Cure All Stars: Spring Carnival♪	Love Momozono / Cure Peach		
2016	Pretty Cure All Stars: Singing with Everyone♪ Miraculous Magic!	Love Momozono / Cure Peach		
2018	HUGtto! Pretty Cure - Futari wa Prety Cure: All-Stars Memories	Love Momozono / Cure Peach		
2023	Pretty Cure All-Stars F	Love Momozono / Cure Peach		

=== Video games ===
List of voice performances in video games
Year	Title	Role	Notes	Source
2006	Digimon Savers An Mission	Manami Nitta 新田真奈美	PS1/PS2	
2009	Wand of Fortune ja:ワンド オブ フォーチュン	Ami · Sarovarra アミィ・サロヴァーラ	PS1/PS2	
2009	Fresh Pretty Cure! Playing Collection	Love Momozono / Cure Peach	DS	
2010	Wand of Fortune ~ Prologue to the future ~	Ami · Sarovarra アミィ・サロヴァーラ	PS1/PS2	
2010	Another Century's Episode: R	Spring One スプリング・ワン	PS3	
2010	God Eater Burst	Players' voice プレイヤーズボイス	PSP	
2012	Kamikoi ja:神さまと恋ゴコロ	Hisashi Ishii 等々力慧	PSP, also 2014	
2012	Tenebrae from the Darkness 闇からのいざない TENEBRAE I	Ryoko Kamiya 神谷涼子	PSP	
2014	Dream C Club Gogo	Karia 花里愛	PS3	
2015	Sweet Clown ~Gozen Sanji no Okashi na Doukeshi~; SWEET CLOWN ～午前三時のオカシな道化師～	Neige ネージュ		
2016	Wand of Fortune R	Ami · Sarovarra アミィ・サロヴァーラ		
2016	Raidako - Azure chapter - 雷子 -紺碧の章-	Kanou 風杏		
2016	SA7 - Silent Ability Seven	Sakurai 櫻井創		
2016	Dynamic Chord feat. Liar-S V edition	Amemiya Geno 雨宮詩央		

=== Dubbing ===
List of voice performances in overseas productions
Series	Role	Dub for	Notes	Source
Power Rangers Dino Force Brave	Yun Dohee/Brave Pink Dino	Lee Yu-jin		

- Zoo - Chloe Tousignant (Nora Arnezeder)

=== Tokusatsu ===
List of voice performances in tokusatsu
Year	Title	Role	Notes	Source
2005	Mahou Sentai Magiranger	Student	(Actor) ep 15	
2005	Kamen Rider Hibiki	Office Lady	(Actor) ep. 36	
2008	Kamen Rider Kiva	Octopus Fangire	Ep. 2	
2010	Tensou Sentai Goseiger	TV announcer, Pikarime of the Shakōkidogū	Ep. 5 (Actor), 28 (Voice)	
2012	Tokumei Sentai Go-Busters	Kentateloid (Tateloid (Kenloid voiced by Daisuke Kishio))	Ep. 43	
2015	Shuriken Sentai Ninninger	Poison Arrow Ninja Suzumebachi	Ep. 33	
