= List of Hell Girl characters =

The Japanese anime television series Hell Girl, produced by Aniplex and Studio Deen, features a variety of fictional characters that appear regularly among the incidental humans that serve as the subject of each episode. The story focuses on the existence of a supernatural system that allows people to take revenge by having other people sent to Hell via the services of the mysterious titular character and her assistants who implement this system. Some of the humans are able to observe deeper into Hell Correspondence.

== Supernaturals ==
=== Ai Enma ===
Ai Enma (閻魔 あい, Enma Ai)
Voiced by: Mamiko Noto (Japanese); Brina Palencia (English)
Portrayed by: Sayuri Iwata (TV show); Tina Tamashiro (movie)
The main protagonist of the series as well as an anti-heroine . With long, straight black layered hair in a hime-cut, ruby-red eyes and pale skin, she is a spiritual entity with a tragic past, who lives in a place frozen in time as it basks in eternal sunset, along with her grandmother. There are 3 dolls visible near the computer, which are her companions. With an old computer inside their house, Ai is able to receive the names of the clients who have used the website, and delivers their revenge. She normally wears a black school girl uniform, but always wears a black kimono with floral designs when delivering the vengeance of a client. Whenever a contract is fulfilled, after the targeted person suffers the hellish hallucinations which exploit their flaws and crimes, she appears to the condemned and recites the following rite, before rowing them to eternal damnation:
闇に惑いし哀れな影よ (やみにまどいしあわれなかげよ, Yami ni madoishi awarena kage yo; "Oh pitiful shadow lost in the darkness)
...人を傷付け貶めて (... ひとをきずつけおとしめて, ... Hito o kizutsuke otoshimete; bringing torment and pain to others)
罪に溺れし業の魂 (つみにおぼれしごうのたま, Tsumi ni oboreshi gō no tama; Oh damned soul wallowing in your sins)
いっぺん... 死んで見る？ (いっぺん しん で みる？, Ippen shinde miru?; How would you like to see what death is like?")
Ai began her career as the Hell Girl by her own act of vengeance on the villagers who sentenced her to a sacrificial death as part of their village's tradition. Her eyes, once a deep brown, turned red arguably at the point where Sentarou (her childhood friend and cousin who gave in under the villagers' pressure to bury her alive) gave the first shovel of soil onto her face. She broke out of her grave after a while, and took revenge on the entire village with her wrath, burning it to the ground. While doing so, a song was sung as the village burnt down. The song was called Sakura Uta. Her task of fulfilling other people's vengeance and ferrying people to Hell is her punishment, a task which she had performed for 400 years after that incident. A Spider, which is later revealed to be the God of Hell, gave her new life again and made a pact with her; in exchange for her immortal form, she cannot enter Hell and must remain on the shores of Hell, acting as the deliverer of people's hatred and vengeance. In order to serve these tasks, the God of Hell demanded that Ai forget her own hatred, numbing herself to the sufferings of others and becoming a mere observer of any happenings. If she hadn't accepted this punishment, the souls of her beloved ones would have to wander in Hell forever. Having no other choice, Ai agreed with the God of Hell and became the Hell Girl.
Although this task is presented as atonement, it is unknown whether she will ever be freed of it. Wanyūdō noted she still had feelings, though, although she did not express them strongly, and it was later revealed that Ai had been ordered to close her heart by the Spider. But the experiences she has with the Shibatas made Ai express anger towards them. When enraged, Ai demonstrates the ability to hurl great blasts of energy, as well as the power to create elaborate illusions and teleport. She also has the ability to show someone the future of a grudge, as she showed Yuzuki in Episode 16 of Mitsuganae. Though, this ability may be limited to some degree, as Ai was unable to predict her confrontation with the Hell Boy, Gilles de L'Enfer.
In the second season, Ai becomes more expressive and shows more emotions, being more willing to interact with her "clients" and victims. She even puts up a "V for Victory" sign in front of her target by way of mocking him as he is dragged to his doom. She had also been seen reading from a fashion magazine while her compatriots watch over their client, and had shown concern towards a mother who willingly ended her life so that her daughter doesn't have to send her to Hell. As she witnesses Takuma Kurebayashi's disheartening persecution, Ai recollects her emotions pertaining to her own wrongful persecution and she defies her 'employer', the God of Hell, and becomes restored to human life, and killed shortly thereafter, when saving Takuma from his tormentors. After Ai's self-sacrifice, her body dissolves into sakura petals and drifts into the sky.
In the beginning of the third season, Ai transports another girl, Yuzuki, to a strange illusion and a vision, where Ai possessed her. Eventually, her body is later released during The Six-script Lantern ceremony in her town in which the gate to Hell is temporarily open allowing Ai to be released from her body. Ai eventually reveals to Yuzuki that she is destined to become her successor. Ai disappears without a word after Yuzuki becomes Hell Girl. Eventually she returns to take the role of Hell Girl once again in order to spare Yuzuki from being sent to Hell.

=== Wanyūdō ===
Wanyūdō (輪入道)
Voiced by: Takayuki Sugō (Japanese); R Bruce Elliott (English)
Portrayed by: Hisahiro Ogura (TV show); Akaji Maro (movie)
Wanyūdō is the first of Ai's three companions. He generally appears as an old man whose eyes remain shut, wearing a traditional yukata with a long-sleeved haori, a fedora, and a red scarf around his neck. When needed by Ai, he takes the form of the black straw doll that Ai hands to her clients in the series. He also frequently takes the form of Ai's coach with burning wheels when she goes to the human world to claim a soul. The coach bears the same black flame-crest that appears on the chest of those people who contract with the Hell Girl. Despite appearing quite mild-mannered, frail and weak with age at most times, Wanyūdō possesses considerable skills in martial arts and is capable of hurling fireballs and performing feats of inhuman strength. Wanyūdō's name is derived from the yōkai of the same name and means "A wheel entering the road". In episode 12 of Futakomori, it is revealed that he was the wheel of a princess' entourage carriage which slipped on the edge of a cliff causing the carriage to fall off the cliff. The coach caught fire and all aboard were killed. As a result, he became a tsukumogami terrorizing people in the form of a flaming wheel with his own enlarged, infuriated face as a hubcap, until he met Ai and she invited him to join her as her first companion. Wanyūdō revealed to Ai his ability to shapeshift. Wanyūdō lives out his life in peace as a human after Ai dies at the end of the second season, but is soon recruited by Kikuri to become Ai's assistant again. At the end of the third season he comes to the aid of the newest Hell Girl, Yuzuki, but returns as Ai's assistant after she becomes Hell Girl again.

=== Ren Ichimoku ===
Ren Ichimoku (一目 連, Ichimoku Ren)
Voiced by: Masaya Matsukaze (Japanese); Todd Haberkorn (English)
Portrayed by: Kazuki Kato (TV show); Raiku (Movie)
Ren is Ai's second companion, and usually takes the form of an attractive young man in a green cardigan and a black shirt. His hair covers the left side of his face and that part of his face is usually unseen. He has the ability to see the inside of a building through projecting the eye on the walls and ceilings. The large eye can also be used as a weapon through projecting intense flashes of light. When required, Ren becomes a blue straw doll. Ren's name means "one glance company". He is sometimes referred to as "Moku" or "Ishimoto Ren". His powers in human form is a reference to Daidarabotchi, a type of mythological giant that is enshrouded in shadow. It is later revealed that Ren is a tsukumogami, a type of spirit that originates from an artifact which has gained sentience after a long period of existence. In Ren's case, he was once a katana, forced to be aware and watch whatever was done with him. He was given his current form(s) by Ai, who collected him after he was abandoned on a large rock after a battle, during which his most recent owner was slain. Ai thinks that he is looking for something and asks him to accompany her. He agrees, saying that the rock he was abandoned on was getting pretty boring. Since that time, Ren has apparently grown quite fond of his human form, displaying considerable vanity from time to time. Ai claims she invited him to join her because there is something that Ren is looking for, a fact perhaps manifested in Ren's occasional puzzlement and inability to understand the things humans do. Alternatively, some of Ren's comments indicate that what he was looking for was companionship, something to fill the emptiness of his existence as a sword used for endless killing. Ren has apparently developed feelings for his colleagues, seeing them as family. Ren lives his life in peace as a human between the events of the second and third seasons. This proves to be short lived after he is recruited by Kikuri to become Ai's assistant again. Ren serves as a science teacher at Yuzuki's school several times while investigating clients that attend the school. At the end of the third season when Yuzuki becomes Hell Girl, he and Hone investigate why Tsugumi is moving out of town. They suspect it was because of Hajime and because Tsugumi was unable to save Yuzuki. Ren becomes Ai's assistant once again after she replaces Yuzuki as Hell Girl.

=== Hone Onna ===
Hone Onna (骨女; Bone Woman)
Voiced by: Takako Honda (Japanese); Jennifer Seman (English)
Portrayed by: Aya Sugimoto (TV show); Manami Hashimoto (movie)
Hone Onna is Ai's third companion, and she often takes the form of a woman in a kimono with its obi tied in front. She dislikes being called "old lady". She becomes the red straw doll when necessary by tossing her red obi jime over her shoulder. Hone Onna and Ren investigate the people who make a contract and the ones they have a grudge against. She usually infiltrates human society in casual clothing to investigate cases, on these occasions she tends to use the pseudonym "Sone Anna". She has used throwing knives as weapons in the first season of the show, and has shown considerable skill with these weapons. Hone Onna also seems to have some skill as a contortionist, which allows her to squeeze into very small places. The name Hone Onna comes from the yōkai of the same name, literally meaning "bone woman", which reflects her ability to expose the bones in her body to scare the victims of the revenge Ai delivers. It is revealed that she had been a yūjo (遊女; ゆうじょ) (prostitute) named Tsuyu who was betrayed by a man whom she had fallen in love with after he sold her to a brothel to be able to pay off his own debts. Tsuyu was betrayed again when she attempted to arrange the escape of a fellow yūjo named Kiyo with a man who had come to truly love Tsuyu. Tsuyu and the man were later murdered by a yakuza, and that same yakuza cast Tsuyu into a river afterward. Spirits rising from human bones thrown into the river before merged with Tsuyu's restless spirit, transforming Tsuyu into the yōkai Hone Onna, in which form she later met Ai. Hone lives out her life as a human after Ai dies at the end of the second season. This proves to be short lived as Kikuri comes to recruit her several years later to become Ai's assistant again. After Yuzuki becomes Hell Girl, she and Ren investigate why Tsugumi is moving out of town. The two suspect it is because of Hajime and because Tsugumi was unable to save Yuzuki. Hone becomes Ai's assistant again when she replaces Yuzuki as Hell Girl.

=== Ai's Grandmother ===
Ai's Grandmother (あいの祖母, Ai no Sobo)
Voiced by: Eriko Matsushima (Japanese); Juli Erickson (English)
She is never actually seen in the series, other than as a shadowy silhouette behind a paper screen that is always spinning thread in her room. She occasionally notifies Ai when a new client beeps on the computer and advises her, occasionally commenting on the cases she takes up. She doesn't talk to anyone except Ai, although in an episode in season one, she made the exception of talking to Shibata Hajime. A single human eyewitness in Futakomori who had observed Ai's grandmother ran in terror, implying that her appearance may be other than human. During the final episode of Futakomori she stops spinning threads for the first time and thanks Ai's three assistants for everything they have done. Ai's Grandmother doesn't appear in the third season until episode 14. That is due to the fact that neither of Ai's companions reside in the realm of Eternal Twilight anymore, and until that episode, instead of the usual ritualistic bathing and the grandma preparing Ai's nagajuban, Ai simply took over Yuzuki's body and appeared already dressed.

=== The Spider ===
The Spider (人面蜘蛛, Jinmen Gumo)
Voiced by: Hidekatsu Shibata (Japanese); John Swasey (English)
Commonly known for the phrase "So saith the magical spider" said by Ren after the phrase "Your grievance shall be avenged" said by the spider. An oddly-coloured spider with three eyes upon its abdomen, which appears in the sunset world where Ai and her assistants reside between assignments. It speaks with the voice of a man and is apparently Ai's superior, having been the one to pronounce sentence on her after she killed the people of her village. It appears to be holding the souls of Ai's loved ones (her parents) as hostage. If Ai does not do the task she has been given, The Spider has threatened that her parents would wander in darkness for eternity. The Spider demonstrates an ability to pilot the ferryboat to Hell and tries to restrain Ai, having decided to take her to Hell after her feelings of rage reawakened and she violently attacked the Shibatas. Ai turned out to be too strong for it to hold her without her consent. The Spider is neither liked nor trusted by Ai's assistants, with whom it in turn does not speak. In the last episode of Futakomori, Wanyūdō identifies The Spider as the God of Hell. It can be inferred that The God of Hell deliberately exposed Ai to a situation reminiscent of her own death in order to test whether she would obey its will or act on her impulse to interfere with Takuma's plight. The God of Hell returns in season 3 to punish the newest Hell Girl, Yuzuki, after she breaks the rules and tries to send a grudge of her own to Hell. Ai then returns to save Yuzuki from being sent to Hell by The God of Hell, and she offers to replace Yuzuki as Hell Girl. The God of Hell accepts and restores Ai's position as Hell Girl.

=== Kikuri ===
Kikuri (きくり)
Voiced by: Kanako Sakai
An enigmatic girl introduced in Futakomori. Some people said she is similar to Nemesis (mythology) in Greek as goddess of vengeance. Little is known about her except the fact she is not human. She can wander freely between the mortal plane and Ai's house in the sunset world, sometimes interfering with her and her companions' job; in one instance, she brought a human into the sunset world out of mischief. In stark contrast to Ai, Kikuri has completely purple eyes and her personality is far more childish than Ai's. She has stated that she likes Ai, and some of her actions and use of powers seem to be causing the greatest amount of suffering and fear possible. She seems to take delight in acts of low-level destructiveness, such as chopping off flowers or destroying anything that Ai cares for. She has shown incredible skills with her loincloth, using it to catch or hit objects with considerable accuracy and skill. Despite the fact that she wreaks havoc freely, she has only taken orders from Ai alone. This is seen when Kikuri touches Ai's grandmother's spinning wheels despite the woman's protests, ceasing only when Ai tells her to. In the last episode of the second season, it is revealed that Kikuri is a host for the will of The God of Hell, which can take over her body as it pleases. Hence, it becomes questionable how many of her malicious acts were of her own will and which were instigated by her master. Some of her acts could have been to ensure that Ai's clients would pull the string and send their tormentor to Hell. Nevertheless, she is still compassionate, showing a brief bout of grief immediately after Ai's death. After Ai's death and the release of her beloved ones to wander as lost souls, Kikuri rides on the boat and says "It's over... that was Ai's answer... Well done". As she says those words, she pokes a cherry the color of Ai's eyes in her former childish way. In the third season, Kikuri possesses a wind-up doll that often needs to be rewound by Yamawaro. She also expresses a desire to become Hell Girl several times. She is possessed by The God of Hell again at the end of the third season, but reverts to Kikuri after Ai becomes Hell Girl again. She is apparently unaware of the fact that she is a host of The God of Hell, as she merely expresses a sensation of feeling sick before being possessed.

=== Yamawaro ===
Yamawaro (山童)
Voiced by: Hekiru Shiina
A hellish creature commanded by the new Hell Girl in season 3, who takes on the look of a young boy, though he can also become a yellow straw doll. In human form, he calls himself by the name of Huang (黄). Often quiet and having a gentle demeanor, not much is known about him yet. He follows Kikuri on their assignments in the real world, referring to her as princess. His name is derived from the same name given to a legendary mountain-dwelling creature in Kyūshū from Gazu Hyakki Yakō, an illustrated book on Japanese folklore demons. In episode 6 of Mitsuganae it is hinted that Yamawaro has the power to manipulate objects. In Episode 17 of "Mitsuganae", it is revealed that his name basis holds some truth.

He was a ghostly boy who roamed a mountain but whenever he was seen by humans, he looked like a walking pile of mushrooms. It seems in his time before joining Hell Girl, he looked upon a family by the name of Ashiya. Their son Hikaru had gone missing many years ago. The father of the household was a scientist trying to obtain eternal life. Yamawaro stepped in as their son. Ms. Ashiya accepted him with no worry. Mr. Ashiya, knowing that Yamawaro was obviously not human, used Yamawaro for his "Caterpillar fungus" experiments which still manifests in him till this day. He stated it was "to extend his wife's life". After learning of this, Ms. Ashiya sent Yamawaro away, hoping to spare him from the parasitic experiments at the cost of her own life. She contacted Hell Correspondence to gain revenge on her husband calling it "Hikaru's vengeance". Despite Yamawaro's begging, she pulled the string. Yamawaro watched as the Ashiya mansion swirled away into a cloud of dust. Ms. Ashiya along with it, clutching what seems to be a young boy. This was a key experience to Yamawaro. After Yuzuki becomes Hell Girl, he and Kikuri simply walk away. He is not seen again until The God of Hell possesses Kikuri. After this happens, he returns and helps save Yuzuki from the grasp of The God of Hell by using a powerful supernatural blast. He comes to the aid of Ai again at the end of the third season.

In the fourth season, Yamawaro shows interest to Michiru's existence. Knowing the fate of Michiru to be Ai's successor, Yamawaro decided to be Michiru's assistant and aid her in her tasks. Formerly, he is Ai's fourth companion; now, Yamawaro is the first companion for Michiru.

=== Michiru ===
Michiru (ミチル)
Voiced by: Misaki Watada

Michiru is a mysterious young girl who suddenly appear before Ai and her companions in season 4. She does not seem to recall who she is and where she came from, aside from being a supernatural. Michiru questions the morale of Ai's job as the Hell Girl, and also the ugly truth of human nature. She had a short teal colored hair, jade-green eyes; with a beauty mark below her right eye, and on her neck. Her attire is a long-sleeved green dress, with white leggings that covers her legs.

In Episode 5 of 'Yoi no Togi', Michiru slowly remembers everything about her. Michiru, also known as Sagae Michiru (寒河江ミチル) was the daughter of a man from an electric company in a small town. The son of the landlord (who was influenced by his parents' jealousy), forced her to follow him and his two lackeys to a pond in the jungle. The three boys tried to drown her, but failed as Michiru managed to free herself. However, during the struggle, the ground beneath them collapsed, causing them to all fall in, and Michiru was the only one to survive. After the death of the children, the townsfolk soon turned hostile to her and her family, blaming Michiru for their death; they started to ostracize the Sagaes, to the point that when Michiru went to buy tofu, she was turned away.

Michiru was then deceived by an adult villager to the landlord's grounds, where she was locked away in a storeroom for ten days; which worsen the condition of her mother's health. In spite of being malnourished, she had managed to place a wind chime outside a window through great effort, which enables her parents to find her. However, the villagers found out that they have been reunited; a villager attacked Michiru's father with a crowbar, causing severe injury on his head which kills him instantly. Led by the landlord, the villagers splashed gasoline inside the storeroom, setting them on fire to annihilate Michiru and her parents. Before dying, Michiru's rage had culminated into a powerful grudge that had set fire to the entire village and all the inhabitants. Upon witnessing what she have done, Enma Ai reveals that she has committed an unforgivable sin, one that she must atone for; as the next Hell Girl.

Michiru who was bewildered, refused to accept the role, constantly escaping her encounter with Ai and her companions. Despite her efforts, Michiru always ends up in front of a house that had a wind chime in front of the balcony. The Hell's Crew revealed that it was the work of the Hell's Spider, trying to tempt her into accepting the role. Along the investigation of a client, Michiru slowly got interested and attached with the case; she eventually accepted the Spider's offer and become the successor of Ai, taking the role as the newest Hell Girl. After accepting the role to be the next Hell Girl, Michiru wear a green floral pattern kimono, decorated with multiple large (black and red) roses. Similar to her predecessor, Michiru is able to generate tormenting illusions which will reflect the past sins of her victims. Before delivering them to damnation, Michiru recites her speech;

天に背きし憐れな影よ (てん に そむきし あわれな かげ よ, Ten ni somukishi awarena kage yo,; "Pitiful shadow who turned his back from heaven)
人の痛みに瞼を閉ざし (ひと の いたみ に まぶた を とざし, hito no itami ni mabuta o tozashi,; you closed your eyes to human sufferings,)
過ちを犯せし咎の魂 (あやまち を おかせし とが の たまし, ayamachi o okaseshi toga no tamashī.; committing sins which harms the innocent.)
いっぺん... 死んで見る？ (いっぺん しん で みる？, Ippen shinde miru?; Would you like to see what death is?")

After the completion of her first task, Michiru had a brief conversation with Ai, saying that her first client will not be able to go to Heaven; much to Ai's confusion. Seeing her response, Michiru stated that Ai does not understand how, or what Heaven is. She once again met with the previous episode's victim, Kazama. Instead of taking his request to take him to Hell, Michiru advises him to not make his parents worry, and smile. She ends their meeting by saying "Let's meet in heaven".

== Humans ==
=== Hajime Shibata ===
Hajime Shibata (柴田 一, Shibata Hajime)
Voiced by: Yūji Ueda (Japanese); John Burgmeier (English)
Portrayed by: Kazuhiko Nishimura
A former journalist who earns money by blackmailing celebrities with evidence of their scandals. He began to investigate rumors about the Hell Correspondence website merely out of curiosity, but becomes more heavily involved once he realizes that it is more than just a rumor and people are actually being dragged into the pits of Hell. His daughter Tsugumi seems to have a mysterious connection with Ai Enma, which allows her to see anything significant that Ai sees. Using this ability, Hajime and Tsugumi track down Ai's clients in an attempt to stop them from damning one another. His motivation for doing this is that he believes revenge to be wrong and that it only causes more pain. Later on in the first season, Hajime and Tsugumi are shown Ai's past, which reveals both of them to be descendants of Sentarou, a former friend of, and cousin to Ai who had betrayed her. This motivates Ai to tempt Tsugumi in to sending Hajime to Hell. Much to Hajime's relief, Tsugumi refuses the grudge.
In Futakomori, Hajime is shown to be Ai's biographer. A Detective in Futakomori, named Detective Meshiai, attempts to track him down for questioning, but ultimately fails in locating him; revealing Hajime to have disappeared mysteriously between the events of the first and second season.
In Mitsuganae, Tsugumi does not have contact with Hajime. She explains that after a while of trying to save people, Hajime had become exhausted and had finally given up in trying to stop people from sending one another to Hell. Sometime after that, he had written Ai's biography and disappeared without a trace. Ai's assistants appear to be unaware of what happened to Hajime, revealing Hajime was not sent to Hell by Hell Correspondence. What has happened to him remains unknown.

=== Tsugumi Shibata ===
Tsugumi Shibata (柴田 つぐみ, Shibata Tsugumi)
Voiced by: Nana Mizuki (Japanese); Luci Christian (English)
Portrayed by: Saaya Irie
Hajime's daughter who often refers to him by name (Hajime-chan in the original dub), rather than "father" or "dad". She sees Ai one day while waiting to cross a train track and has a mysterious connection with her ever since. At first, she reports everything she sees through Ai to Hajime, but as the series progresses, she becomes more reluctant to do so as she begins to disagree with her father on whether they should try to stop Ai or not. However, after an innocent nurse is sent to Hell by a drug addict, she begins to realize revenge is wrong. At the end of season one, Ai shows Tsugumi visions of how her father and mother argued just before her mother's death, which lead her mother into leaving the house and dying, in an attempt to blame Hajime for her mother's death so she would send him to Hell. Tsugumi however, refuses.
She is briefly shown in the second season as a source of information for an investigator. She tells Detective Meshiai that Hajime had written Ai's biography for someone, maybe him. She tells him to trust her father and runs away to confront Kikuri, revealing that she has a similar relationship with Kikuri in Futakomori that she had with Ai in the first season.
She is a nurse at academy school in the third season. During The Six-script Lantern ceremony she advises Yuzuki not to go in the Gates of Hell, and then disappears in the fog mysteriously when Yuzuki looks away. She appears to have uncanny knowledge of the supernatural, having known that Yuzuki wouldn't be able to come back if she entered the Gate of Hell. This knowledge may be due to her spiritual connection with Ai and Kikuri. Later on in Mitsuganae, Tsugumi, along with Ai and Yuzuki, are simultaneously lured into a mansion. Upon entering the mansion, Ai and Tsugumi greet each other, showing that they have known each other for quite some time. The mansion that they entered is owned by a man named Mizuragi Shogo, who is holding a pact against Tsugumi. Just as Shogo begins pulling the red string off the straw doll, he is sent to Hell by one of his assistants who held a pact against him; thus sparing Tsugumi from being sent to Hell. Upon leaving Mizuragi Shogo's mansion, she is confronted by Yuzuki, who questions how she avoided becoming Hell Girl, as she was fated to be. Tsugumi responds with saying she believes it is fundamentally impossible to avoid fate, hinting that she had become Hell Girl at one time. Tsugumi expresses how lonely she is several times, confirming that she has no longer contact with her father Hajime. When Yuzuki asks about Hajime, Tsugumi tells her that like her father, she too had become exhausted in trying to stop people from sending their tormentors to Hell, and had given up just as Hajime did. Later on episode 24, Yuzuki's existence begins to erased as Tsugumi only knows her. Tsugumi tries to confront Yuzuki should just accept that what is happening to her. Yuzuki is not the person in the world anymore. Tsugumi notices that all this time Yuzuki's life was an illusion. Towards the end of the third season, she leaves her apartment and moves out of town. She is confronted by Ren and Hone, who suspect Tsugumi is moving out of town because she was unable to save Yuzuki.

In Season 4, she appears in Episode 4, "Bury Me Deep", as an attending staff at Lovely House, a retirement home for the elderly. She states that this is her first job, which calls to question when in the Hell Girl Timeline Yoi no Togi takes place.

=== Ayumi Shibata ===
Ayumi Shibata (柴田 あゆみ, Shibata Ayumi)
Voiced by: Hitomi Nabatame (Japanese); Colleen Clinkenbeard (English)
Hajime's late wife. Hajime devoted more time to his work than to his family, but with the intent to make his wife happy through earning large amounts of money to improve their lifestyle. In her loneliness, Ayumi had an affair with a politician that Hajime happened to be spying on. Because of that incident, he cast her out of the house and forbade her from ever seeing Tsugumi. A few moments later, Ayumi dies in a car accident. Tsugumi keeps her mother's earrings as a memento. Hajime still loves Ayumi very much, and regrets not forgiving her because he believes she would not have died if he had. On the other hand, Ai tried using her death to tempt Tsugumi to send her own father to Hell.

=== Sentaro Shibata ===
Sentaro Shibata (柴田 仙太郎, Shibata Sentarō)
Voiced by: Toshiyuki Toyonaga (Japanese); Jason Liebrecht (English)
A descendant of Hajime and Tsugumi, and Ai's cousin. About 400 years before the main story, he was a member of Ai's village, who treated her with care when she was being ostracized by the rest of the villagers. When Ai was selected for the Seven Sending sacrifice, her parents asked Sentaro to save Ai from being sacrificed, so he helped her escape and hide from the remaining villagers -- ergo pretending she was dead. However, six years after the initial sacrifice, both he and Ai were found out; As such, Ai's family was executed -- with her being alive long enough to get buried alive. As her last sight was an unwilling Sentaro helping the villagers bury the grave, Ai sought to curse everyone. After some time, she rose from the grave and burnt the entire village down while singing her and Sentaro's childhood song. Sentaro was possibly the only survivor, as he went on to build the Shichidouji temple and start his sweets business, which carries on to the present storyline.

=== Takuma Kurebayashi ===
Takuma Kurebayashi (紅林 拓真, Kurebayashi Takuma)
Voiced by: Ayumi Fujimura
Introduced in Futakomori's 14th episode, The Peaceful Lakeshore, Takuma is a quiet boy who lives in Lovely Hills. He is misunderstood and often bullied by his fellow townsfolk who believe he's the "Devil's Child", much like Ai was in her village. When he first made his appearance, his mother was killed by a friend of his father, who was also seriously injured in the incident. As the murderer sets to kill Takuma, the former was sent to Hell, but the police arrive moments later, and the townsfolk end up thinking that Takuma is the murderer. It is unclear if he possesses as much spiritual powers as Ai, but he does have the ability of foresight and he has been observed by Ai for some time throughout the story. Throughout the overarching plot of Futakomori, Takuma's portrayal of The Devil's Child hinges upon the fact that the townspeople send one another to Hell, and frames Takuma for each incident. At the height of such insanity, the townsfolk vow to kill Takuma and anyone associated with him. Ai saves him from the townsfolk but ends up being killed by them for her efforts and role as Hell Girl. At the end of the season, it is revealed that his father has recovered almost completely and that his friend, Hotaru Meshiai, will soon wake up from her cold induced coma, as Takuma hopes.

=== Yuzuki Mikage ===
Yuzuki Mikage (御景ゆずき, Mikage Yuzuki)
Voiced by: Satomi Satō
First appearing in season 3, Yuzuki is a 9th grader schoolgirl who currently studies at Saigawara 4th Junior High School. Although a normal everyday girl, she actually has deep relations to the Hell Correspondence website. While Yuzuki is in the bathtub one night, Ai appears before her, suddenly kissing her. After that event, Ai possesses her and uses her as a human vessel to carry out her duties as Hell Girl. When a person forms a contract with the Hell Correspondence, Yuzuki will become Ai to send the victim to Hell. Much like Tsugumi in the first season, she is able to see visions of those who have called upon Hell Girl; although many of the people are acquaintances of her. About halfway through the series, Ai releases herself from Yuzuki during The Six-script Lantern ceremony in her town in which the gate to hell is temporarily open. After Akie is sent to Hell, Yuzuki's eyes were seen to flash red for a moment, foreshadowing future events. After Akie is sent to Hell, she tries to keep Ai's clients from sending their tormentor to Hell. Despite the fact that the cycle of hatred is human nature and a part of life, she never stops trying to end it. Even after being shown visions by Ai proving that there's no way to stop revenge, she continues to try. Later, Ai reveals that she is destined to become the next Hell Girl. Later on, Yuzuki's existence begins to fade away. She becomes unable to contact her mother and finds her herself not being able to find personal possessions of her own, such as a student ID card that disappears into thin air. Furthermore, she finds that Tsugumi and the members of the Hell Correspondence are the only ones who can recognize her. Later, Tsugumi tells Yuzuki that she should just accept what is happening to her, just as she had done when disappeared from the world long ago. All this time Yuzuki's life was an illusion. Yuzuki cannot accept this and desperately runs back home to her apartment, which is shown to be in terrible decaying condition. Upon entering her apartment room, she discovers the skeleton of a child hugging a stuffed animal. Ai appears with the Hell Correspondence, and confirms that this skeleton is indeed Yuzuki. Yuzuki did not believe the skeleton to be her, until Ai showed her that she had died as a young child a short while after her Mother died. After Ai shows Yuzuki her past, she accepts the fact that it is destiny for her to become the Hell Girl. She puts on a kimono and her eyes turn red. Her first request is by Akie's Dad, who is begrudging Azusa, the girl who had sent Akie to Hell. However, Mr. Takasugi finds himself unable to pull the string. Yuzuki becomes angry and decides to take revenge upon Azusa herself, using her newly acquired powers. This revenge proves to be short lived after The Spider appears to stop Yuzuki, discharge her as Hell Girl, and send her to Hell as punishment for acting on feelings. Yuzuki is saved from being sent to Hell by Ai. Ai later proposes to replace Yuzuki as Hell Girl, and is accepted as her replacement.

=== Akie Takasugi ===
Akie Takasugi (高杉 秋恵, Takasugi Akie)
Voiced by: Kanae Oki
Yuzuki's best friend since childhood, also a 9th grader schoolgirl at Saigawara 4th Junior High School. Unlike Yuzuki, Akie possesses an outgoing and broad-minded personality. Her father is the commander of Saigawara Metropolitan Police. Akie employs a private teacher, Azusa, to help her with her studies. After Akie becomes emotionally intimate with Azusa, Azusa brings Akie home to show Akie her father, who had become paralyzed and bedridden due to a traffic accident, that was ordered to not be investigated further by Akie's father. Akie gets mad and moves out from her father, but then Azusa reveals her true intention, to bully Akie with rape and use the Hell Correspondence to send Akie to Hell to torment her father. Azusa finally chooses to send Akie after the Six-script Lantern ceremony. In the later episodes, Akie turns back from the Hell and to come to the aid of the new Hell Girl, Yuzuki. In the final episode of the third season, it is revealed that Akie was indeed in Hell and did not turn back and come to Yuzuki's aid. The Akie that supposedly turned back from Hell to aid Yuzuki was an illusion created by The Spider to tempt Yuzuki into trying to send Azusa to Hell.

=== Koukichi ===
Koukichi (耕吉, Kōkichi)
Voiced by: Akeno Watanabe (Japanese), Orion Pitts (English)

=== Gilles ===
Gilles de L'Enfer (ジル・ドゥ・ロンフェール, Jiru Du Ronfēru)
Voiced by: Jun Fukuyama (Japanese), Greg Ayres (English)
A television psychic, who calls himself the Hell Boy (地獄少年, Jigoku Shōnen). As a child he possessed powers that frightened even his own parents to the point where they killed their own son. His powers gave him the ability to escape Hell. After he escaped Hell he sought revenge against his parents and sent them to Hell. He made his first appearance in season 1, challenging Ai to a duel. He gained the upper hand in the duel, overpowering both Ai and her three companions. Before he was able to defeat Ai and send her to Hell, he himself was sent to Hell by a man named Hiroshi 'Esper' Watanabe, who was holding a pact against him. While being ferried to Hell, he promised he would escape Hell once again. He is referenced at the end of episode 10 of Mitsuganae by a small group of school joggers as they cross the finish line. Gilles makes a brief cameo appearance in episode 21 of Mitsuganae, appearing as an egg shaped character stitched on a hat, which is owned by a young boy named Kaito. The character is wearing the exact same attire that Gilles wore in season one. The facial expression on the Hell Boy character symbol appears to change throughout the episode, showing that Gilles may have been supernaturally altering the symbol on the hat. The symbol grins during tense moments and the eyebrows become bold during moments involving the straw doll, implying that Gilles feels pleasure from pain and suffering caused by the Hell Correspondence. He may have also been manipulating Kaito's actions, as Kaito sends an unborn child to Hell after the hat is thrown out. Gilles also makes a cameo in chapter 26 of the manga.
