= Hell Girl =

Japanese anime television series and its franchise

- Eighth Japanese DVD cover, featuring (from left to right) Ai Enma, Wanyudo, Hone Onna and Ren Ichimoku

地獄少女 (Jigoku Shōjo)
- Genre: Dark fantasy; Supernatural thriller
- Created by: Hell Girl Project; Hiroshi Watanabe
- Anime television series
- Directed by: Takahiro Omori
- Produced by: Ai Abe; Norihiro Hayashida
- Written by: Kenichi Kanemaki
- Music by: Yasuharu Takanashi; Hiromi Mizutani
- Studio: Studio Deen
- Licensed by: AUS: Madman Entertainment; BI: Revelation Films; NA: Funimation (expired)
- Original network: Kids Station, Animax, MBS, Tokyo MX
- English network: SEA: Animax Asia; SG: Okto; US: IFC; ZA: Animax South Africa
- Original run: October 4, 2005 – April 4, 2006
- Episodes: 26
Further information
Manga
Written by	Miyuki Etō
Published by	Kodansha
English publisher	NA: Del Rey Manga
Magazine	Nakayoshi
Original run	November 2005 – September 2008
Volumes	9
Anime television series
Hell Girl: Two Mirrors
Directed by	Takahiro Omori
Produced by	Ai Abe; Norihiro Hayashida
Written by	Kenichi Kanemaki
Music by	Yasuharu Takanashi; Hiromi Mizutani
Studio	Studio Deen
Licensed by	NA: Sentai Filmworks (expired)
Original network	Animax, MBS, Tokyo MX, Kids Station
English network	SEA: Animax Asia
Original run	October 7, 2006 – April 6, 2007
Episodes	26
Television drama
Directed by	Makoto Naganuma; Hideaki Takahashi; Yoshikazu Kaneko
Produced by	Hideaki Takahashi; Sadayoshi Satō; Yoshikazu Kaneko
Written by	Akemi Moriyama; Tomoko Yamakawa; Noboru Moai; Kumiko Satō
Music by	Tomoki Hasegawa
Studio	Izumi TV Production
Original network	Nippon TV
Original run	November 4, 2006 – January 27, 2007
Episodes	12
Video game
Jigoku Shoujo Akekazura / Mioyosuga
Developer	Compile Heart
Platform	Nintendo DS, PlayStation 2
Released	September 27, 2007 (DS), September 19, 2009 (PS2)
Anime television series
Hell Girl: Three Vessels
Directed by	Hiroshi Watanabe
Produced by	Ai Abe; Ai Matsuki
Written by	Kenichi Kanemaki
Music by	Yasuharu Takanashi; Hiromi Mizutani; Kenji Fujisawa
Studio	Studio Deen
Licensed by	NA: Sentai Filmworks (expired)
Original network	Animax, MBS, Tokyo MX
English network	SEA: Animax Asia
Original run	October 4, 2008 – April 4, 2009
Episodes	26
Manga
New Hell Girl
Written by	Miyuki Etō
Published by	Kodansha
Magazine	Nakayoshi
Original run	March 19, 2009 – November 6, 2009
Volumes	3
Manga
Hell Girl R
Written by	Miyuki Etō
Published by	Kodansha
Magazine	Nakayoshi
Original run	March 19, 2010 – July 15, 2013
Volumes	11
Manga
Hell Girl: Ai Enma Selection, Super Scary Story
Written by	Miyuki Etō
Published by	Kodansha
Magazine	Nakayoshi
Original run	July 20, 2007 – April 27, 2012
Volumes	13
Anime television series
Hell Girl: The Fourth Twilight
Directed by	Takahiro Omori
Produced by	Kazunori Adachi; Takanori Yamayoshi; Yoshiyuki Shioya
Written by	Kenichi Kanemaki
Music by	Yasuharu Takanashi
Studio	Studio Deen
Licensed by	NA: Aniplex of America
Original network	Tokyo MX, GTV, GYT, MBS, BS11
English network	SEA: Animax Asia
Original run	July 14, 2017 – September 29, 2017
Episodes	12
Live-action film
Hell Girl (2019)
- icon

Hell Girl (Japanese: 地獄少女, Hepburn: Jigoku Shōjo), also known as Jigoku Shōjo: Girl from Hell, is a Japanese anime series conceptualized by Hiroshi Watanabe and produced by SKY Perfect Well Think, Tokyo MX, Wakasa Seikatsu, Fujishoji, Aniplex and Studio Deen. It is directed by Watanabe and Takahiro Omori, with Kenichi Kanemaki handling series composition, Mariko Oka designing the characters and Yasuharu Takanashi, Hiromi Mizutani and Kenji Fujisawa composing the music. The series focuses on the existence of a supernatural system that allows people to take revenge by having other people sent to Hell via the services of the mysterious title character and her assistants who implement this system. Revenge, injustice, hatred, and the nature of human emotions are common themes throughout the series.

It was broadcast across Japan on numerous television stations, including Kids Station, Animax, Tokyo MX, MBS and others, between October 2005 and April 2006. A second season, titled Hell Girl: Two Mirrors, was broadcast from October 2006 to April 2007. A third season, titled Hell Girl: Three Vessels, was broadcast from October 2008 to April 2009. A fourth season, Hell Girl: The Fourth Twilight, was broadcast from July to September 2017.

== Plot ==
Each episode typically follows the format of a self-contained short story where a person has been suffering torment from an acquaintance to the point that he or she accesses the Hell Correspondence website and submits a request to get rid of the person. Ai Enma, the Hell Girl, appears, and presents a doll with a red string on its neck that can send the named antagonist to Hell. When the string is pulled, Ai and her companions then torment the antagonist, offering a last chance to repent (which is usually refused), and ferry them to Hell. The price of the contract is that the person making the request will also have to go to Hell after his or her life is over.

Starting with the eighth episode, Hajime Shibata, a former journalist who has resorted to taking scandal photos to blackmail people, begins investigating the rumors surrounding the Hell Correspondence website, and discovers that people are literally being dragged to Hell. His daughter, Tsugumi, is somehow able to see Enma. As the series progresses, they become conflicted on whether they should intervene to save the people involved. In the second season, a mysterious young girl from Hell, named Kikuri, is introduced. Kikuri is able to travel freely between Earth and the Twilight realm where Enma resides. Later, the plot centers around Takuma Kurebayashi, a boy who is blamed by his townsfolk for causing disappearances around the town that are, in reality, caused by the townsfolk using the "Hell Correspondence" website. In the third season, Kikuri returns to recruit Enma's assistants along with a yōkai named Yamawaro, who accepts an old offer from Enma to become her fourth assistant. The story follows Enma's mysterious possession of a young schoolgirl, Yuzuki Mikage. In the fourth season, the story introduces a new character named Michiru, whom Ai helps realize her fate as a successor to the Hell Girl title.

=== Hell Correspondence ===
The medium through which a client contacts Ai Enma has changed over the centuries, however nowadays a website is used. Initially clients would write the names of whom they hated on an ema, which later changed to sending a letter to the address appearing in a three-column newspaper advertisement only visible to those with enough hatred. Once the Internet became available, people could access the "Hell Correspondence" website, otherwise known as the "Hotline to Hell". Soon after, the site was adapted into a mobile version that could be accessed from cell phones.

Each medium can only be used at midnight by one who harbors a desire for revenge against their object of hatred. Should someone submit the name of someone against whom they bear a grudge or immense hatred, and their request is accepted, Ai Enma will take them to a realm of perpetual twilight where she offers them a straw doll, which is one of her companions, with a red string wound around its neck and describe to the client the details of their contract. Should the client pull the string tied around the doll's neck, Ai Enma will ferry the target of the revenge straightaway to Hell. However, once the client's life has ended, they will also go to Hell, and a black crest-shaped mark appears on the client's chest to serve as a permanent reminder of their decision to send someone to Hell. However, this mark is no guarantee that the person themselves will not be sent to Hell by another client.

== Media ==
=== Anime ===
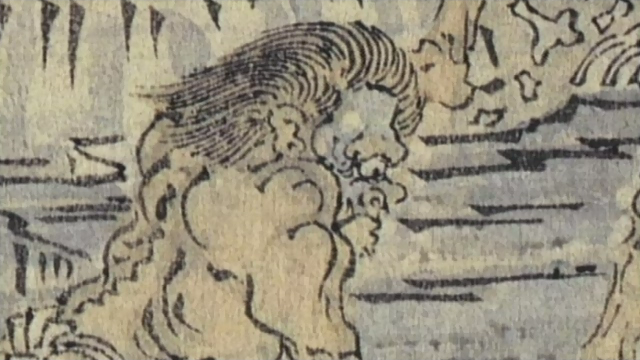
Part of a painting by Kawanabe Kyōsai, featured in the opening theme of Hell Girl

The Hell Girl anime series is produced by Aniplex and Studio Deen. The series was created by Hiroshi Watanabe and directed by Takahiro Omori, with scripts by Kenichi Kanemaki. The first season spanned 26 episodes and premiered across Japan on Kids Station between October 4, 2005, and April 4, 2006. The second season, Hell Girl: Two Mirrors (地獄少女 二籠, Jigoku Shōjo Futakomori), also spanned 26 episodes and aired from October 7, 2006, to April 6, 2007, across Japan on Animax. The third season, Hell Girl: Three Vessels (地獄少女 三鼎, Jigoku Shōjo Mitsuganae), spanning 26 episodes aired from October 4, 2008, to April 4, 2009, on Animax, MBS and Tokyo MX. A fourth season, Hell Girl: The Fourth Twilight (地獄少女 宵伽, Jigoku Shōjo: Yoi no Togi), spanning 12 episodes, of which the later 6 are rebroadcasts of episodes from previous seasons, aired from July 14 to September 29, 2017, on MBS and Tokyo MX, with the main cast reprising their roles.

The first season was also licensed for North American distribution by Funimation. The U.S. cable/satellite channel IFC announced in September 2007 that it acquired Hell Girl from FUNimation, which then premiered on July 9, 2008. Section23 Films announced that Sentai Filmworks has licensed the second season, with the first DVD set shipping on May 25, 2010, and the second set on July 27. On June 24, 2010, Section23 Films announced that Sentai has also the third season of Hell Girl, under the subtitle Three Vessels. The first set was released on September 28, 2010, followed by the second set released on November 30, 2010. Funimation later dropped the series from internet streaming and home media distribution after reaching the end of the license term in early 2013. The fourth season is licensed by Aniplex of America and was streamed on Amazon Prime Video and Crunchyroll.

=== Music ===
A total of six soundtracks were released by Sony Music Entertainment. Two original soundtrack albums were released for Hell Girl. The first album contains twenty-four tracks and was released on January 25, 2006. The second album contains twenty-six tracks and was released on April 19, 2006. Two original soundtrack albums were released for Jigoku Shōjo Futakomori. The first album contains twenty-three tracks and was released on January 24, 2007. The second album contains twenty-three tracks and was released on March 21, 2007. Two original soundtrack albums were released for Jigoku Shōjo: Mitsuganae. The first album contained twenty-eight tracks and was released on December 17, 2008. The second album contained twenty-seven tracks and was released on March 4, 2009.

=== Manga ===
A manga adaptation has featured art by Miyuki Etō (永遠 幸, Etō Miyuki). It has been serialized in Kodansha's Nakayoshi shōjo manga magazine since October 2005. The manga was published into three different titles. The first shares the same name of the anime and a total of three volumes were released from January 25, 2006, to October 6, 2008. The manga was originally licensed by Del Rey Manga, and the first volume was released January 2008. The last three volumes have been released as an omnibus in October 2010.

The second manga, titled Shin Jigoku Shōjo (新・地獄少女, New Hell Girl), released a total of three volumes from March 19, 2009, to November 6, 2009. The third, titled Jigoku Shōjo R (地獄少女R, Hell Girl R), released a total of eleven volumes from March 19, 2010, to July 15, 2013. A single manga volume, titled Jigoku Shōjo Enma Ai Serekushon Geki Kowa Sutourii (地獄少女 閻魔あいセレクション 激こわストーリー, Hell Girl: Enma Ai Selection, Super Scary Story) was released on April 30, 2014.

=== Live-action ===
==== Television ====
Hell Girl was adapted into a single live-action television drama series that premiered on Nippon Television from November 4, 2006, spanning 12 half-hour episodes. The series was directed by Makoto Naganuma. The theme song for the series is "Dream Catcher". The live action adaptation features Sayuri Iwata as Enma Ai, Kazuki Kato as Ichimoku Ren, Aya Sugimoto as Onna Hone, Saaya Irie as Shibata Tsugumi, and Kazuhiko Nishimura as Shibata Hajime.

==== Film ====
A live-action film adaptation, directed by Kōji Shiraishi and distributed by GAGA Pictures and Constantin Film was released on November 15, 2019.

=== Video games ===
Hell Girl has been adapted into a video game for the Nintendo DS entitled Jigoku Shōjo Akekazura (地獄少女 朱蘰), which was developed by Compile Heart and released in Japan on September 27, 2007. Compile Heart made a PlayStation 2 version entitled Jigoku Shōjo Mioyosuga (地獄少女 澪縁) released on September 17, 2009. A puzzle game has also been released on the Konami Net DX service for i-mode-compatible mobile phones.

== Russia ban ==
In June 2022, it was reported that Saint Petersburg banned Hell Girl in Russia that claimed for "materials aimed at creating motivation among minors to destructive illegal behavior, including the use of violence against others".
