= List of Tropical-Rouge! Pretty Cure episodes =

- Season 18
- Cover of the first home media release of the series, featuring (clockwise from top) Cure Papaya, Cure Flamingo, Laura, Kururun, Cure Summer, and Cure Coral
- No. of episodes: 46

Release
- Original network: ANN (ABC TV, TV Asahi)
- Original release: February 28, 2021 – January 30, 2022

Series chronology
- ← Previous; Healin' Good PreCure Next → Delicious Party PreCure

Tropical-Rouge! PreCure is the eighteenth television anime series in Izumi Todo's Pretty Cure franchise, produced by ABC Television and animated by Toei Animation. The series aired in Japan from February 28, 2021, to January 30, 2022, succeeding Healin' Good PreCure in its initial time slot, and was succeeded by Delicious Party PreCure. The opening theme is "Viva! Spark! Tropical-Rouge! Pretty Cure" (Viva！Spark！トロピカル～ジュ！プリキュア) by Machico while the first ending theme is "Tropical I・N・G" (トロピカ I・N・G) by Chihaya Yoshitake. Starting from episode 17, "Aiming to Go My Way!!" (あこがれ Go My Way!!) by Chihaya Yoshitake and Rie Kitagawa is used as the second ending theme.

== Episode list ==
| No. | Title | Directed by | Written by | Original release date |
|---|---|---|---|---|
| 1 | "Tropica-Shine! Fully Motivated! Cure Summer!"; Transliteration: "Toropikare! Yaru Ki Zenkai! Kyua Samā!" (Japanese: トロピカれ！ やる気全開！キュアサマー！) | Yutaka Tsuchida | Masahiro Yokotani | February 28, 2021 |
An energetic girl named Manatsu Natsuumi moves to Aozora City from Minamino Island to live with her mother, who works at the city's aquarium. Meanwhile, in the kingdom of Grand Ocean, a mermaid named Laura is tasked with finding humans who can open her assigned compacts to fight back against the Witch of Delays. Following the Mermaid Queen's orders, Laura heads off to Aozora City. Meanwhile, Manatsu arrives at the city, reunites with her mother and goes sightseeing. While taking a break, Laura and Manatsu encounter each other, with Laura explaining her mission while secretly intending to complete it for her own agenda. Later, a hermit crab general of the Witch named Chongire arrives and creates a monster called a Yaraneeda to steal Motivation Power from a group of runners. Manatsu notices a strange energy field in an area of the city and witnesses the Yaraneeda. When Laura is captured, Manatsu resolves to immediately do the most important thing. As a result, Laura's assigned compact opens and grants her the power to become one of the legendary warriors, Pretty Cure, foretold in Grand Ocean's legends. With this new power, Manatsu becomes Cure Summer, defeats the Yaraneeda, and rescues Laura, who salvages and returns the stolen Motivation Power. Afterwards, Laura and Manatsu befriend each other. while the Witch of Delays is notified of the Pretty Cure's appearance but decides to address the issue later.
| 2 | "Manatsu and Laura! What Is More Important?"; Transliteration: "Manatsu to Rōra! Dotchi no Daiji ga Ichiban Daiji?" (Japanese: まなつとローラ！ どっちのダイジが一番大事？) | Yūzō Sasaki | Masahiro Yokotani | March 7, 2021 |
While Laura intends to find more humans who can open her three remaining pacts, Manatsu prepares for her first day at Aozora Middle School. In her class, she recognizes a girl who she saw as she explored the city. The two become friends and discuss the school clubs they intend to join. Manatsu learns that her new friend, Sango Suzumura, desires to join the Cosmetics Club and runs a cosmetic shop alongside her mother, Miyuki Suzumura. However, Laura and Manatsu begin fighting among themselves, with Laura going in Manatsu's bathtub and the school's swimming pool to gain her friend's attention. As a result, the two leave each other after a quarrel. Laura heads off to the city, where she encounters Chongire making a Yaraneeda to attack the city. Meanwhile, Manatsu begins to regret lashing out at Laura and rushes over to help her upon being alerted of the Yaraneeda's rampage. Manatsu transforms to fight and defeat the Yaraneeda, with Laura returning the stolen Motivation Power. Afterwards, Laura and Manatsu reconcile, though the latter misses out on the school's club orientation.
| 3 | "Believe In Yourself! Totes Adorbs! Cure Coral!"; Transliteration: "Jibun o Shinjite! Kyūto Ippai! Kyua Kōraru!" (Japanese: 自分を信じて！ キュートいっぱい！キュアコーラル！) | Tsuyoshi Tobita | Masahiro Yokotani | March 14, 2021 |
Manatsu heads out on a weekend trip around Aozora City with some of her classmates, including Sango. The group meets at the city's shopping mall, where Manatsu is fascinated by the merchandise sold and Sango gives her purchased ice cream to a younger girl. The group then heads off to the aquarium, where Sango is separated from them while trying to return a lost wallet. Sango then tries to search for her friends, only to cross paths with Laura. The next day, Sango confides in Manatsu that she does not like standing out among others due to an incident back in kindergarten. Upon hearing her out, Laura encourages Sango to believe in her "cute". Later that day, Chongire summons a Yaraneeda to attack a park, forcing Manatsu to head off to transform and fight it. However, the Yaraneeda overpowers Cure Summer and Laura, and Sango, who followed Manatsu to the battle, finally gains the courage to believe in her own choices. As a result, the second Tropical Pact opens, granting her the power to transform into Cure Coral and help Laura and Cure Summer defeat the Yaraneeda and reclaim the stolen Motivation Power. After the battle, Manatsu and Sango become closer friends and resolve to do their best, even as Pretty Cures.
| 4 | "Cure Papaya Pops Out! This Is My Tale!"; Transliteration: "Hajikeru Kyua Papaia! Kore ga Watashi no Monogatari!" (Japanese: はじけるキュアパパイア！ これが私の物語！) | Kōji Kawasaki | Masahiro Yokotani | March 21, 2021 |
Manatsu and Sango discuss on what clubs to join, during which Laura suggests making one themselves. As the two do research for their own club at the school's library, they encounter a stoic bespectacled girl named Minori Ichinose, who does not believe in the existence of mermaids despite liking mermaid stories. Deciding to find out more about that girl, Sango and Manatsu discover that she is a top student in school. However, when they try to compliment her on a story she wrote, Minori, believing otherwise, turns down their praises due to a past traumatic experience back when she was in the school's literature club. The next day, Minori meets Sango and Manatsu at an exhibition at the city's museum and encounters Laura for the first time. Despite the others' encouragement, Minori timidly tries to back off. At that moment, a sea slug-like general of the Witch of Delays, Numeri, summons a Yaraneeda to terrorize the museum's courtyard. Manatsu and Sango transform to fight the Yaraneeda, only for it to overwhelm them. With Laura's encouragement, Minori finally resolves to believe in herself. As a result, the third Tropical Pact grants Minori the power to become Cure Papaya, and she defeats the Yaraneeda with assistance from her friends. Afterwards, Minori, having broken her limits, befriends the trio.
| 5 | "Here Comes Senpai! Burn! Cure Flamingo!"; Transliteration: "Senpai Sanjō! Moero! Kyua Furamingo!" (Japanese: 先輩参上！ 燃えろ！キュアフラミンゴ！) | Takao Iwai | Konomi Shugo | March 28, 2021 |
Manatsu meets a third-year student named Asuka Takizawa, and she and her friends decide to try recruiting her to become the fourth Pretty Cure because of her physical strength. However, Asuka is not interested, much to their chagrin. Meanwhile, Sango and Manatsu struggle to get their club started since there are very few clubrooms left. Asuka arrives to help them, though she does not intend to join their club. Later that day, Minori, Manatsu, Asuka, and Sango clean up a packed room to use for their club, during which Laura compliments Asuka and points out the latter's strengths. As such, Asuka, despite not truly believing in teamwork, begins to warm up to the others. Suddenly, Numeri appears and summons a Yaraneeda from a totem pole in the garbage. Manatsu, Sango, and Minori transform to fight the Yaraneeda, but it overpowers them and Laura. Asuka, alerted by the Yaraneeda's rampage, intervenes and resolves to protect her friends. As a result, the fourth and final Tropical Pact grants Asuka the power to become Cure Flamingo. All four Cures and Laura work together to defeat the Yaraneeda, with Cure Flamingo finishing the Yaraneeda off. Afterwards, Asuka decides to believe in teamwork again, befriends the group, and joins their club.
| 6 | "Commencement! The Name: Tropical Club!"; Transliteration: "Ima Hajimaru! Sono Na wa, Toropikaru Bu!" (Japanese: 今はじまる！ その名は、トロピカる部！) | Junji Shimizu | Masahiro Yokotani | April 4, 2021 |
While the Witch of Delays and Butler discuss their plans and the Pretty Cure's interference, Manatsu and her friends discuss their club activities. Manatsu decides to try everything and approaches the president of Aozora Middle School's student council, Yuriko Shiratori, to initiate her club. However, she is rejected, and so they and Laura try out many ideas for their club, but are not satisfied with them. As they worry about the imminent club application deadline, they encounter a quartet of alumni students from their school looking for a penguin ornament. Remembering that they cleared out said ornament while cleaning their clubroom, they head off to search for it and learn a shop had taken it in. However, the penguin reacts with a dark orb it was housing and turns into a Yaraneeda. In response, they transform to fight and defeat the Yaraneeda. Afterwards, they return the penguin ornament to the alumni group and finally get their club application approved, with Manatsu having officially decided on their club activity.
| 7 | "Here It Comes! Kururun The Sea Fairy"; Transliteration: "Yatte Kuru! Umi no Yōsei Kururun!" (Japanese: やってくる！ 海の妖精くるるん！) | Hideki Hiroshima | Isao Murayama | April 11, 2021 |
While jogging at the beach, Manatsu and her friends spot a seal, which Laura recognizes as the Mermaid Queen's pet Kururun. They examine the seal, with Laura misinterpreting its desires and Minori deducing that the seal was hungry. Minori also guesses that Kururun headed to the city from Grand Ocean to make a delivery for Laura, but was swept away by an ocean current. As such, they and Laura search for Kururun's package, with Minori finding it hanging on a tree branch because someone else found it and placed it there. Just then, a prawn general of the Witch, Elda, appears to intercept Kururun's delivery and summons a Yaraneeda. They transform to fight the Yaraneeda, during which Laura discovers that the Queen sent her treats. Despite Elda's taunts, Cure Papaya stands her ground and finishes the Yaraneeda off, forcing Elda to retreat. Afterwards, the girls, Kururun, and Laura bond over the treats, with Laura correctly deducing that Kururun is staying with her and the others.
| 8 | "Our First Club Activity! Tropica-Shining Lunch Boxes!"; Transliteration: "Hajimete no Bukatsu! Obentō de Toropikatchae!" (Japanese: 初めての部活！ お弁当でトロピカっちゃえ！) | Fumio Itō | Mio Inoue | April 18, 2021 |
The group sits together for bento lunches, during which Manatsu samples her friends' ingredients. Asuka then mentions how her family helps one another with the chores, inspiring Manatsu to make a bento meal inspired by Kururun. As such, Asuka leads them in making the meal, with Laura assisting them with cooking. Elsewhere, Chongire summons a Yareneeda to terrorize a mobile food stall and its surrounding area. They are alerted to the attack and transform to fight the Yaraneeda, but are hungry from not eating lunch and are overwhelmed. As such, Asuka leads the others to freeze the Yaraneeda and eat their meal before returning to defeat it. Afterwards, they enjoy their bentos together and Manatsu prepares dinner for herself and her mother.
| 9 | "Make-Up is Magic? Get Tropical With A Movie!"; Transliteration: "Meiku wa Mahō? Eiga de Toropikaru!" (Japanese: メイクは魔法？ 映画でトロピカる！) | Hiroyuki Kakudō | Hiroyuki Yoshino | April 25, 2021 |
The Tropical Club makes preparations for Aozora Middle School when it is selected to be a film shooting location. Manatsu and her friends meet an actress named Yuna, who is insecure about her role and will have her makeup covered by Sango's mother. As such, they train Yuna for her role while Sango is tasked with dressing up as a mascot for Miyuki's beauty parlor. Later, Manatsu's friends recount how Manatsu influenced them and Yuna takes over Sango's task once she wears out. However, Numeri arrives and summons a Yareneeda on the day of the filming, forcing Manatsu and her friends to transform to fight it. Cure Coral buys the other Cures time to grab mirrors as part of Cure Papaya's plan to blind the Yaraneeda, allowing Cure Coral to defeat it and Laura to salvage the Motivation Power. Afterwards, the group and several students get involved in the film while the Witch's forces are briefed on their latest plans.
| 10 | "Stack Up On Motivation! Pretty Cure! Mix Tropical!!"; Transliteration: "Yaru Ki Kasanete! Purikyua! Mikkusu Toropikaru!!" (Japanese: やる気重ねて！プリキュア！ミックストロピカル！！) | Takao Iwai | Yoshimi Narita | May 2, 2021 |
Manatsu's friends postpone their club activities to study, with Manatsu revealing she is not good at it. Manatsu tries studying on her own, but finds herself struggling to do so. As such, her friends teach her how to study properly. At that moment, Chongire arrives and summons a stronger Yaraneeda variant called a Zenzen Yaraneeda to attack the school's yard. They transform to fight the Yaraneeda, but it overpowers Manatsu and saps her Motivation Power. Laura's Mermaid Aqua Pot is also knocked away, forcing her to leave to search for it while Asuka, Minori and Sango unsuccessfully try to awaken Manatsu. When the Zenzen Yaraneeda returns, they transform to fight it again, only to be overpowered. However, Manatsu stands up to Chongire for her friends, and is energized and motivated once more. Laura also returns, having found the Pot, and gives the four Cures a new power, allowing them to execute Mix Tropical and defeat the Yaraneeda. Afterwards, Manatsu reconciles with her friends and resolves to study harder with them, despite revealing she failed all of her school tests.
| 11 | "Get Excited! Sand Art by the Beach!"; Transliteration: "Moriagare! Umibe no Sando Āto!" (Japanese: もりあがれ！ 海辺のサンドアート！) | Ippo Takatoya | Konomi Shugo | May 9, 2021 |
Manatsu and her friends discuss activities they can participate with the other school clubs, with Minori suggesting sand art at the beach. As such, they hold a sand art contest involving several people in their school and participate in it as well. Over the course of the contest, Manatsu and her friends bond over making their own sand art. However, a heavy downpour occurs on the second day of the contest. Taking an idea from Laura as she looks through her photographs, Manatsu uses a parachute to protect the sand art from the rain. At that moment, Numeri summons a Zenzen Yaraneeda to attack the beach, forcing them to transform to fight it. Despite its power, the Cures and Laura manage to counter and defeat it. Afterwards, everyone admires their sand artwork, including Manatsu and her friends even though they did not win. Later on, Laura confides in Manatsu that she feels lonely not being able to join in their club activities. In response, Manatsu promises to find a club activity she can be part of.
| 12 | "Confiscated! The Aqua Pot Is Not Allowed!?"; Transliteration: "Bosshū! Akua Potto wa Kōsoku Ihan!?" (Japanese: 没収！アクアポットは校則違反！？) | Takayuki Murakami | Isao Murayama | May 16, 2021 |
Manatsu and her friends are discussing their next club activity when the head of the school's disciplinary committee, Masami Kakuta, searches the room because of rumors of mermaid sightings in the school. Upon learning of the search, Asuka confronts the disciplinary committee over the matter, and they mention a rule allowing them to confiscate suspicious items to maintain order in the school. The next day, rumors of a mermaid around and in school run rampant while Yuriko turns down Asuka's complaints and Masami almost spots Laura. Masami approaches the Tropical Club and confiscates the Aqua Pot. Later on, Elda summons a Zenzen Yaraneeda to attack a playground, and despite the other girls' worries, Laura encourages them to fight it without her. They transform to fight the Yaraneeda, but struggle against it. Meanwhile, Laura sneaks around school while evading Masami and manages to reclaim the Pot. She then returns to the Cures to salvage the Zenzen Yaraneeda's stolen Motivation Power, allowing the four Cures to finish it off. Afterwards, the disciplinary committee confronts the Tropical Club about the Aqua Pot, but Asuka and Minori assert its importance to the club citing another rule and revealing that their teacher approved of it before the committee leaves with Masami.
| 13 | "A Slapstick School Broadcast! Echo, A Mermaid's Song!"; Transliteration: "Dotabata Kōnai Hōsō! Hibike, Ningyo no Uta!" (Japanese: ドタバタ校内放送！ 響け、人魚の歌！) | Tatsuma Minamikawa | Yoshimi Narita | May 23, 2021 |
When the school's public announcement mentions rumors of a mermaid, Manatsu and her friends discuss folklore concerning mermaids, with Laura stating their singing talents. Later on, they meet members of the broadcasting club and offer to help him. On the day of the broadcast, one of the hosts is unable to join the others, forcing Manatsu and her friends to host the broadcast instead. They end up struggling to carry on the show, but Laura salvages the situation by pretending to be an interviewee. Meanwhile, Chongire summons a Zenzen Yaraneeda to attack a supermarket, forcing them to leave Laura to finish the job while they head off to transform and fight it. They struggle to fight the Yaraneeda until Laura finishes the broadcast and hurries to assist them in defeating the Yaraneeda. The next day, the broadcasting club receives requests of wanting to hear Laura sing again, much to the girls' joy.
| 14 | "Leave It To Us! Tropical Teachers At Preschool!"; Transliteration: "Omakase! Hoikuen de Toropika Sensei!" (Japanese: おまかせ！ 保育園でトロピカ先生！) | Yuriko Kado | Mio Inoue | May 30, 2021 |
The Tropical Club is told of a teaching experience at a preschool, which they are interested in. At the preschool, Manatsu and her friends play and learn together with its pupils, during which Sango and Laura come across an introvert boy, Wataru and a girl, Ruri, both of whom are interested in bugs. At that moment, Elda summons a Zenzen Yaraneeda to attack the preschool, forcing them to evacuate the students and transform to fight the Yaraneeda. Despite their best efforts, the Yaraneeda tries to attack Ruri and Wataru as they try to protect the chrysalis until Cure Coral intervenes. Laura encourages Wataru and Ruri to cheer for the four Cures, who execute a plan to incapacitate the Zenzen Yaraneeda before finishing it off. Afterwards, Laura tells the pair to keep the Pretty Cures' existence a secret before leaving with her friends, though she is still intent on becoming queen one day.
| 15 | "Minori is Laura and Laura is Minori!?"; Transliteration: "Minori ga Rōra de, Rōra ga Minori!?" (Japanese: みのりがローラで、ローラがみのり！？) | Tsuyoshi Tobita | Konomi Shugo | June 6, 2021 |
As the Tropical Club make preparations to cheer on the school's softball team, Minori and Laura accidentally get sucked into the Aqua Pot. When the two emerge, they discover that they have swapped bodies, though their friends only notice the change when they head out to greet them. Meanwhile, Minori and Laura discover each others' experiences as a mermaid and a human respectively. When their friends discover their switch, everyone discusses the situation, with Minori bringing Laura home with her for the night. Back at home, Minori and Laura admit to each other that they enjoyed being in each others' bodies, but Laura worries over permanently being stuck in Minori's body. The next day, Chongire summons a Zenzen Yaraneeda to attack a cafe. Manatsu, Sango, and Asuka arrive at the scene and transform to fight the Yaraneeda, with Laura joining them. Laura, still in Minori's body, tries and fails to transform, but Minori desires to do so despite being in Laura's body, reversing the body swap. Minori transforms and brings Laura to the battle, and they join their comrades in defeating the Yaraneeda. Afterwards, Minori and Laura admit they like being themselves, with Minori finding herself being bolder. However, Laura misses her experience in Minori's body and wishes to become human.
| 16 | "The Witch's Trap! Laura Has Been Captured!"; Transliteration: "Majo no Wana! Torawareta Rōra!" (Japanese: 魔女の罠！ 囚われたローラ！) | Takao Iwai | Masahiro Yokotani | June 13, 2021 |
As Manatsu and her friends go on a mountain hike, the Witch and Butler discuss the current situation and Laura, owing to the lack of Motivation Power being gathered because of her ability to reclaim it. Meanwhile, the Tropical Club discuss more activities they can participate in over the summer vacation, and end up discovering Laura is absent. As such, they all search for her, with Minori finding Laura at the school's library reading The Little Mermaid. Later that day, Manatsu encourages Laura and tries to hide her identity as a mermaid from her home-coming mother. That night, Laura decides to try discovering more of the human world. The next day, Manatsu and her friends try on nail polish when a Zenzen Yaraneeda attacks the city's port. Everyone rushes off to fight the Yaraneeda, but it and Chongire capture Laura. Shocked by the defeat, they discuss their situation when aquarium director Mafune Hirabayashi encourages them. Later at the beach, they transform and follow a trail of pictures left behind by Laura, who is taken to the Witch as she offers her a chance to become a human.
| 17 | "A Mermaid's Miracle! Transform Into Cure La Mer!"; Transliteration: "Ningyo no Kiseki! Henshin! Kyua Ramēru!" (Japanese: 人魚の奇跡！ 変身！キュアラメール！) | Ippo Takatoya | Masahiro Yokotani | June 20, 2021 |
Picking up from the last episode, while Cure Summer and the other Cures search for Laura, the Witch warns Laura to not interfere with her efforts before sending her generals to steal more Motivation Power. As such, the Cures are forced to surface to fight two Zenzen Yaraneedas summoned by Chongire and Numeri. Meanwhile, Laura locates Kururun and tasks her with stealing the basement key to escape, but is caught by the Witch and Butler while trying to reclaim the Mermaid Aqua Pot. While Laura evades the Witch, she is bested by Butler, forcing Kururun to save her. The Mermaid Queen congratulates Laura for finding the Pretty Cure, but Laura wants to help her friends and is given a rocky object to aid her. Laura hurries back to Manatsu and her friends to protect them, with her resolve causing her to get her own Heart Kuru Ring. As well, the stony object cracks and becomes the Mermaid Aqua Pact, allowing her to transform into Cure La Mer. With this new power, she revives her comrades, salvages the stolen Motivation Power, and leads the others in finishing off the enemies. Afterwards, Laura joyfully discovers she has become a human and moves into Manatsu's house.
| 18 | "I'll Walk! I'll Swim! Laura's First Day of School!"; Transliteration: "Aruku yo! Oyogu yo! Rōra no Hatsu Tōkō!" (Japanese: 歩くよ！泳ぐよ！ ローラの初登校！) | Fumio Itō | Isao Murayama | June 27, 2021 |
Laura begins her first day in Aozora Middle School, where she finds herself enjoying some areas while struggling with other areas. Later on, Laura vents her frustration over struggling in some school subjects when Eiko Mizushima, the president of the Swim Club, invites her to her club, which Laura happily accepts. As Laura prepares to swim, Numeri, having been chosen by Butler to attack, summons a Zenzen Yaraneeda to attack the school's swimming pool, forcing Manatsu and her friends to transform to fight it. Laura arrives later and witnesses her friends being overpowered. Despite Numeri's taunts, she transforms to save her friends, salvage the stolen Motivation Power, and lead her comrades in finishing the Yaraneeda off. Afterwards, Laura is unable to swim, but Manatsu encourages her, telling her that the next day of school will be fun as well. As such, Laura decides to join the Tropical Club.
| 19 | "Frightened Manatsu! The Seven Mysteries Of The School!"; Transliteration: "Manatsu Panikku! Gakkō no Nana Fushigi!" (Japanese: まなつパニック！ 学校の七不思議！) | Saihō Noro | Hiroyuki Yoshino | July 4, 2021 |
Manatsu and her friends discuss their school's newspaper requesting articles, with Minori bringing up ghost stories to put in and everyone decides to investigate ghost stories. As such, they head to an abandoned mansion on a mountain behind their school, where Minori explains more about the building and a doll located in it. When everyone tries to escape from an imminent accident, Manatsu ends up stuck in the mansion. She talks with the doll, who asks her to bring her food everyday. Manatsu does as told until she learns of the doll's origins and remembers the mansion's demolition date. As Manatsu's friends try to search for her, Numeri and Chongire head out to search for Elda, who crash-landed into the mansion earlier that week. Chongire summons a Zenzen Yaraneeda to intercept Laura and her friends, who all transform to fight it. Manatsu is alerted by the commotion and heads out, resolving to protect the mansion. She transforms and helps her comrades defeat the Yaraneeda while Numeri rescues Elda. Afterwards, the Tropical Club gets their article on the mansion's doll published as Elda brings the doll back to the Witch's lair.
| 20 | "Detective Minorin! The Missing Melon Bread Case!"; Transliteration: "Mei Tantei Minorin! Kieta Meron Pan Jiken!" (Japanese: 名探偵みのりん！ 消えたメロンパン事件！) | Tatsuma Minamikawa | Yoshimi Narita | July 11, 2021 |
Manatsu returns to the clubroom after finding her lost wallet and discovers that the premium tropical melon bread she won in a lucky draw has gone missing. As such, she decides to investigate who took the bread. During the investigation, Kururun is seemingly found innocent of the crime, but Laura is accused of the theft. Asumi, Sango, and Minori also state their last known activities and locations but everyone struggles to solve the case as discord grows between them. Meanwhile, Chongire, having been selected to steal Motivation Power, summons a Zenzen Yaraneeda to attack the city. Manatsu is alerted of the attack and resolves to set aside the incident to stop the villains, leading everyone in transforming and fighting the Yaraneeda. Amidst the battle, La Mer learns she was the one who ate Manatsu's snack; she tearfully takes the blame and apologizes. Cure Summer reassures her, but the others apologize to her for the grief they caused with their accusations; she forgives them all, reaffirming their friendship. They work together to defeat the Yaraneeda, salvaging its Motivation Power before finishing it off. Afterward, Kururun explains their actions, and everyone bonds over tropical melon bread bought from another neighborhood.
| 21 | "Summer Vacation! The Tropical Club's Training Camp Plan!"; Transliteration: "Natsuyasumi! Toropikaru Bu no Gasshuku Keikaku!" (Japanese: 夏休み！ トロピカる部の合宿計画！) | Takao Iwai | Mio Inoue | July 18, 2021 |
Manatsu and her friends decide to go on a camping trip to Minamino Island over their school's summer break. The girls gather at Manatsu's house, where they discuss activities over the course of the camp, with Manatsu mentioning a cave said to hide treasure and her mother, Aoi, suggesting they can relax at the beach. Following her mother's idea, Manatsu decides to show her friends the island's secret beach. The next day, Manatsu and her friends assemble to head off to their destination, but Chongire makes a Zenzen Yaraneeda out of Manatsu's suitcase to attack the city, forcing them to transform to fight it. All five Cures work together to avoid the Yaraneeda's attacks and incapacitate it before La Mer salvages its Motivation Power and finishes it off. Afterwards, they arrive in time for the ferry and head over to Minamino Island, while Butler reads about the island's treasure cave.
| 22 | "A Secret Adventure! Find The Mermaid's Treasure!"; Transliteration: "Himitsu no Daibōken! Ningyo no Takara o Sagase!" (Japanese: ヒミツの大冒険！ 人魚の宝を探せ！) | Takayuki Murakami | Masahiro Yokotani | August 1, 2021 |
While the Tropical Club continue their camp, the Witch creates a new orb to summon a new kind of Yaraneeda. The group heads to Manatsu's secret beach before heading to a senior named Tomi, who recalls seeing a forest mermaid that allegedly hid the treasure in the island's cave. With that, they head off to the cave to find the treasure, but run into Numeri and are separated from Laura. The remaining members of the group venture deeper into the cave and encounter Numeri again, who summons a Zettai Yaraneeda. The four transform to fight the Yaraneeda while Laura finds an object she deduces as the treasure in another part of the cave, which is the Perfume Shiny Brace. She later transforms and joins them in the battle, when she discovers that the item has transformed into the Perfume Shiny Ring, allowing her to perform Ocean Bubble Shower and defeat the Yaraneeda. After the battle, everyone retreats as the caves flood, with Tomi witnessing Laura and believing her to be the mermaid she saw. Later that night, they discuss their situation while Butler reveals to Numeri and Elda more about a cup hidden in the island's caves.
| 23 | "Minamino Festival! Laura, Tell Us Your Wish!"; Transliteration: "Minamino Matsuri! Oshiete, Rōra no Negaigoto!" (Japanese: 南乃祭り！ 教えて、ローラの願いごと！) | Yui Komatsu | Konomi Shugo | August 8, 2021 |
As the Tropical Club enters their last day of camp, they try out many island activities while Manatsu prepares everyone for Minamino Island's festival. Meanwhile, Elda is tasked with retrieving a cup filled with Motivation Power from the caves. As such, she reluctantly heads off to accomplish the task after being promised vacation as a reward. On the evening of the festival, the group participates in writing their wishes on a stone and throwing it into the sea. However, Laura refuses to tell her friends her wish. As she returns to the Witch's lair, Elda notices Laura's stone and turns it into a Zettai Yaraneeda, forcing them to transform to fight it. Amidst the chaos, La Mer recognizes the Yaraneeda as her wish and, refusing to let the others find out about her wish, fights the Yaraneeda before salvaging its Motivation Power and finishing it off. Afterwards, Laura discovers her friends found out about her wish while the Witch receives the cup Elda brought back. The next day, Manatsu helps Laura as she successfully does flutter kicks.
| 24 | "Hot Blooded Battle! Tropical Club VS Student Council"; Transliteration: "Nekketsu Batoru! Toropikaru Bu Tai Seitokai" (Japanese: 熱血バトル！ トロピカる部VS生徒会) | Tsuyoshi Tobita | Isao Murayama | August 15, 2021 |
The Tropical Club attempts to hang a banner, only for it to fly into Yuriko Shiratori's interview. Angered by the incident, Yuriko decides to suspend the Tropical Club when the six girls receive an invitation to a gameshow. As such, both parties decide to settle the club suspension as they compete in the show. On the day of the show, the Tropical Club, the school's student council, and other teams participate in games, but then Numeri arrives and summons a Zettai Yaraneeda to interrupt the games. Asuka and her friends transform to fight the Yaraneeda, salvage its Motivation Power, and defeat it. Following the battle, everyone learns the Tropical Club won the game, backed by a slow-motion camera capturing Asuka's victory in the gameshow's final round.
| 25 | "The Great Sakuragawa-sensei Power Up Strategy!"; Transliteration: "Sakuragawa-Sensei Pawā Appu Dai Sakusen!" (Japanese: 桜川先生パワーアップ大作戦！) | Ippo Takatoya | Mio Inoue | August 22, 2021 |
Homeroom teacher Saki Sakuragawa informs Manatsu's class of next week's class observation day. Later, Manatsu and her friends discuss with her about the observation, with Saki revealing her ageing father will also participate in it, with Minori deducing he wants her to run his family orchard. However, Saki is torn between her familial duties and her desire to teach. Later that day, Saki's father arrives at school for a tour but runs into issues along the way. The next day, Saki tries to impress the parents gathered to see her teaching, but runs into accidents in the process. Amidst the observation, a reluctant Elda, accompanied by Numeri, summons a Zettai Yaraneeda to attack the school. They transform to fight the Yaraneeda before La Mer salvages its Motivation Power and finishes it off. Afterwards, Saki tells her father about her teaching passion, with him allowing her to pursue it since he has received help from others in maintaining his orchard.
| 26 | "Clear Skies! The Night☆of Sparkling Meteor Showers!"; Transliteration: "Harewatare! Kirakira☆Ryūseigun no Yoru!" (Japanese: 晴れわたれ！ キラキラ☆流星群の夜！) | Tomio Yamauchi | Konomi Shugo | August 29, 2021 |
The group meets Shiori Nakagawa, who is trying to start an astronomy club and knows of a meteor shower that occurs every 50 years. Having gained interest in watching the meteor shower, the Tropical Club and Saki plan and advertise a night where anyone in school who is interested can watch the meteor shower. Amidst the duties, Minori mentions the weather forecast stating the night would be cloudy, which would obstruct the view. On the night of the meteor shower, Asuka's father leads some men in a ritual to bring clear skies when Numeri, who was tasked with stealing Motivation Power, summons a Zettai Yaraneeda to steal Motivation Power from the watchers. They transform to protect the ritual and fight the Yaraneeda before La Mer salvages its Motivation Power and finishes it off. Afterwards, the crowd watches the meteor shower, with the ritual successfully being performed.
| 27 | "Disappearing Motivation? The Strange Aquarium Tour!"; Transliteration: "Yaru Ki ga Kieru? Suizokukan Fushigi Tsuā!" (Japanese: やる気が消える？ 水族館ふしぎツアー！) | Takao Iwai | Mio Inoue | September 5, 2021 |
Manatsu and her friends plan a trip to the city's aquarium to see a new dolphin attraction. On the day of the trip, the dolphin attraction's wait time is too long, forcing them to look at other aquatic displays to pass the time. Despite the plan to wait for the crowds to thin, the dolphin attraction is still too long. Meanwhile, Manatsu and the others notice that the people visiting the aquarium have become lethargic. Deciding to investigate the matter, they book a night tour to allow Laura to scout for suspicious activity. Laura encounters Numeri and chases her into the dolphin attraction when Manatsu and the others arrive. Numeri calls out a Zettai Yaraneeda to steal more Motivation Power and attack the girls, who transform to fight the Yaraneeda, only to be overpowered. With help from the dolphins, the Cures are able to salvage the Yaraneeda's Motivation Power and defeat it. The next day, Manatsu and her friends finally visit the dolphin attraction while Laura explores the aquarium.
| 28 | "Cultural Festival! Everyone Together, Let's Put Make-Up On Aozora!"; Transliteration: "Bunkasai! Chikara Awasete, Aozora Meiku!" (Japanese: 文化祭！ 力あわせて、あおぞらメイク！) | Yuriko Kado | Hiroyuki Yoshino | September 12, 2021 |
Amidst anticipation for Aozora School's Cultural Festival, the Tropical Club decides to hold a makeup class, when Laura notices Minori distancing herself from the others. On the day of the festival, as everyone is setting up, Laura investigates Minori and asks some of her old friends about her. While the club mans their booth and help others out with theirs, Chongire heads to the festival to steal Motivation Power from the visitors, but ends up accidentally getting involved in a squid stall before he can strike. As Minori is interviewed over her booth, a Zettai Yaraneeda is summoned. They transform to fight it, but are overpowered. Papaya regains her resolve when the Yaraneeda knocks down the books she borrowed from the library and fights it, allowing her comrades to salvage its Motivation Power and defeat it. As the day ends, Minori relates her past in the school's literature club to her friends and how she left when a senior criticized her story, before recounting on how her new friends changed her life. Meanwhile, Chongire and his colleagues discuss the Witch's situation.
| 29 | "Reviving A Legend! The Pretty Cure's Power-Up Makeover!"; Transliteration: "Yomigaeru Densetsu! Purikyua Omekashi Appu!" (Japanese: 甦る伝説！ プリキュアおめかしアップ！) | Yūta Tanaka | Masahiro Yokotani | September 19, 2021 |
As the agitated Witch makes a red orb which Butler uses on a body of water, Manatsu and Laura dream of a legendary Pretty Cure. As they begin their day, they are suddenly confronted by four Yaraneedas wrecking havoc around the city. They all transform to fight the Yaraneedas, but struggle against their sheer numbers. Amidst the chaos, Manatsu rescues Kururun from a Yaraneeda, but is defeated, drained of her Motivation Power, and engulfed by the Yaraneeda. Kururun hurries to the other four Cures to warn them of Manatsu' plight while Manatsu tries to break free. In response, the other Cures race to rescue Manatsu and encourage her, allowing Manatsu to regain her Motivation Power, transforming and leading the others in fighting the horde of Yaraneeda. La Mer finds the true Yaraneeda, a Chou Zettai Yaraneeda, and salvages its Motivation Power but is unable to defeat it. As the Chou Zettai Yaraneeda prepares to strike, the Cures are visited by the Pretty Cure from Manatsu and Laura's dream, who gives them more power. Using the Tropical Heart Dresser, the Cures execute Land Beat Dynamic to defeat the Yaraneeda. Afterwards, they resolve to defend the city from the Witch and her forces.
| 30 | "General Election! Laura Is The Student Council President!?"; Transliteration: "Dai Senkyo! Rōra ga Seito Kaichō!?" (Japanese: 大選挙！ ローラが生徒会長！？) | Tatsuma Minamikawa | Isao Murayama | September 26, 2021 |
An election for a new president of the school council is held at the school, due to the previous president, Yuriko, retiring. This excites Laura, and she declares she wants to become the new school council president. As she signs up to become a candidate, she becomes competitive with Masami, who also signs up. Meanwhile, Butler and the rest of the group discuss the team obtaining the Land Heart Kuru Ring. While Laura and the girls start a campaign, everyone supports Rika Ichijo instead, making Laura jealous. Later, she, along with Manastu and Sango, learm from Ms. Sakuragawa that Asuka and Yuriko were formerly in the tennis club at the school as partners, but eventually left. Meanwhile, Chongire summons a Chou Zettai Yaraneeda, so they transform to fight the Yaraneeda without Laura, as she is in the election process. However, she notices the Yaraneeda, forcing her to leave and transform to help the Cures defeat the Yaraneeda. Laura later learns that Rika won due to her being forfeited for leaving.
| 31 | "Trouble On The Train! Asuka's School Field Trip!"; Transliteration: "Toraburu Ressha! Asuka no Shūgakuryokō!" (Japanese: トラブル列車！ あすかの修学旅行！) | Takao Iwai | Isao Murayama | October 3, 2021 |
Asuka is on a graduation train trip with her peers when she discovers Laura and Kururun had snuck into her bag. Amidst the trip, Laura and Asuka discover that Numeri had also snuck aboard the train to steal the passengers' Motivation Power and trick her into being left behind during a stopover. Asuka reveals to Laura that she and Yuriko had a falling out when the former violently confronted opponents sabotaging Yuriko's tennis racquet back in the Tennis Club. Just then, Numeri returns with a Chou Zettai Yaraneeda to attack the train and Yuriko and Asuka help evacuate the students to safety. Asuka's friends then assemble to transform, salvage the stolen Motivation Power, and defeat the Yaraneeda. Amidst the battle, Yuriko recognizes Cure Flamingo, having been rescued earlier. Afterwards, Manatsu and company give Asuka her pillow, which Laura dropped while sneaking into the train, while Yuriko starts to wonder about Asuka.
| 32 | "Stride Down The Runway! Sango's Fashion Show!"; Transliteration: "Kakero Ranwei! Sango no Fasshon Shō!" (Japanese: 駆けろランウェイ！ さんごのファッションショー！) | Tsuyoshi Tobita | Konomi Shugo | October 10, 2021 |
A fashion modeller approaches Sango and her mother for help in a fashion show. Sango and her friends discuss it and discover Sango's passion for the show. Sango undergoes practice for the event, but becomes nervous when going down the runway. As the show starts, Numeri summons a Chou Zettai Yaraneeda to attack the fashion show. Manatsu and the other three Cures transform to fight it while Sango helps the other participants with inflating balloons, during which she discovers everyone's motivation and love of cute things. With her morale restored, Sango heads off to help her allies salvage the Yaraneeda's Motivation Power before finishing it off. Afterwards, Sango goes down the runway without a hitch, to everyone's enjoyment.
| 33 | "Viva! Tropica-Shine In 10 Stories!"; Transliteration: "Biba! Juppondate de Toropikare!" (Japanese: Viva！ 10本立てDEトロピカれ！) | Ippo Takatoya | Masahiro Yokotani | October 17, 2021 |
Tropica-shine. Tropical Samurai: Manatsu and Asuka attempt to duel with their katanas, but struggle to put on their lipsticks with them. Tropica-shine. Palace of the Dragon King: Manatsu and company discuss about helping a turtle when Minori brings up the tale of Urashima Taro and Laura brings up another tale. The group then discovers several creatures in distress. Tropica-shine. A Reward From the Turtle: Manatsu and her friends help out the creatures, who in return settle at Manatsu's house out of gratitude, only for her room to be packed with them. Tropica-shine. The Frightening Mansion of Delays: Chongire, Numeri, Elda and Butler try to fulfil their duties, but get distracted while the Witch is too lazy to do anything. Tropica-shine for the Dugong: When the aquarium's Dugong is sick, Sango gets Laura to play the Dugong, only for the resulting creature to scare off the audience. Tropica-shining Switcheroo: Sango and Asuka accidentally swap bodies while trying to stop the Aqua Pot from hitting the ground. Things get worse when Chongire's Chou Zettai Yaraneeda falls on top of the girls, Kururun, and Chongire, causing everyone to swap bodies. Tropica-shine, Yaraneeda!: Asuka attempts to destroy Chongire's Chou Zettai Yaraneeda orb, only to swat it into the Earth, causing the planet to turn into a Chou Zettai Yaraneeda. Tropica-shine. A New Pretty Cure: Kururun dreams of becoming a Cure. Tropica-shine! The Legendary Heartcatch!: Manatsu and her friends admire the Heartcatch Pretty Cure team, which turns out to be Tsubomi's dream. Tsubomi then discusses with her friends about the Tropical-Rouge team. Tropica-shine! A New Move!: Manatsu and her friends discuss the name of their new finisher. They agree to use all of their suggestions, but discover that the attack's name is too long, with the Yaraneeda leaving partway through the attack. Tropica-shine. The Terrifying Haunted Bubble Picture: Manatsu and her friends discover "haunted" bubble pictures Laura took, but discover the not-so-scary truth behind them.
| 34 | "Dreams Are Infinite! What Do You Want To Be When You Grow Up?"; Transliteration: "Yume wa Mugendai! Otona ni Nattara Nani ni Naru?" (Japanese: 夢は無限大！ 大人になったら何になる？) | Hideki Hiroshima | Masahiro Yokotani | October 24, 2021 |
When Butler gives Elda an ultimatum to steal motivation, the latter runs away. Meanwhile, Manatsu is indecisive about what she wants to do when she grows up. As such, everyone visits Manatsu's house, where Manatsu's parents explain they had many aspirations but resolved to do the most important thing. The next day, Elda is encouraged by Chongire to steal Motivation Power, and she summons a Chou Zettai Yaraneeda to target some children. Manatsu and her friends transform to fight the Yaraneeda, while Elda confronts Cure Summer on her belief to do the most important thing when she grows up. With this in mind, Summer leads the team in salvaging the Yaraneeda's Motivation Power and defeating it. Afterwards, Elda returns home empty-handed, but Numeri hands over a jar of Motivation Power to give Butler. As for the Cures, they decide to work towards their future aspirations.
| 35 | "Exciting Halloween! Don't Lose, Manatsu!"; Transliteration: "Wakuwaku Harowin! Makeru na, Manatsu!" (Japanese: わくわくハロウィン！ 負けるな、まなつ！) | Yui Komatsu | Konomi Shugo | October 31, 2021 |
As the school prepares for their Halloween festival, Manatsu and Laura take interest in the costume competition. But then, a stray Yaraneeda attacks the festivities, and Manatsu and her three friends transform to fight it. However, despite managing to salvage the stolen Motivation Power, neither Manatsu nor Laura can properly return it to the victims. As Manatsu blames herself for not listening to anyone's opinions, Chongire summons a Chou Zettai Yaraneeda to attack more partygoers. After a pep talk from Laura, Manatsu resolves to protect everyone's Halloween and leads her friends in transforming to fight the Yaraneeda. However, it traps them until Summer tricks it into freeing them, allowing everyone to salvage its Motivation Power and defeat it. Afterwards, Laura wins the Halloween costume competition.
| 36 | "We're Here! The Land of Mermaids • Grand Ocean!"; Transliteration: "Kita yo! Ningyo no Kuni Guran Ōshan!" (Japanese: 来たよ！ 人魚の国・グランオーシャン！) | Noriyo Sasaki | Hiroyuki Yoshino | November 14, 2021 |
Laura and her friends receive an invitation from Grand Ocean to visit. Upon arriving there, are welcomed by the Mermaid Queen, who congratulates them for their progress as Pretty Cures and reveals the existence of the Marine Kuru Ring. She tasks them with finding it, and while doing so Kururun stumbles upon a dark room. When the Mermaid Queen attempts to take back the Tropical Pacts, Kururun exposes Elda, Chongire and Numeri, who reveal they captured the queen and used a memory machine to lure the Cures into a trap and have them get the Marine Ring for them. The group transforms to fight the generals, who respond by making a Chou Zettai Yaraneeda out of an octopus. The Cures try to fight the Yaraneeda, only to be overpowered. When they declare their resolve to protect Grand Ocean, the Marine Ring appears, but Butler steals it and orders the Yaraneeda to flood the kingdom.
| 37 | "A Mermaid's Memories! Reclaim The Ocean Ring!"; Transliteration: "Ningyo no Kioku! Umi no Ringu o Torimodose!" (Japanese: 人魚の記憶！ 海のリングを取り戻せ！) | Takayuki Murakami | Masahiro Yokotani | November 21, 2021 |
Picking off from the last episode, the Cures examine the damage done to Grand Ocean and stumble across a room housing seashells containing memories of mermaids who encountered humans, while Butler seals away the Marine Ring. They then meet the real Mermaid Queen, Melusine Muses Mnemosyne, who explains that the Witch intends to use the Fool's Casket to gain immortality and make everyone lazy. She also notes that Laura has recovered her memory of her first meeting with Manatsu when she was younger, clarifying that mermaids who meet humans must have their memories erased via a machine. Butler's Chou Zettai Yaraneeda suddenly strikes again, forcing the group to transform and fight it. Their resolve to save the world causes the Marine Ring to reappear with help from the legendary Pretty Cure, allowing Laura to salvage the stolen Motivation Power and defeat the Yaraneeda with their new attack, Marine Beat Dynamic. Afterwards, Laura and Manatsu bond once again while Melusine and the legendary Pretty Cure recall and discuss the past. Meanwhile, the Witch tries to recall her history.
| 38 | "Get the Win! Asuka's Friendship Smash!"; Transliteration: "Kimero! Asuka no Yūjō Sumasshu!" (Japanese: 決めろ！ あすかの友情スマッシュ！) | Kimiharu Mutō | Isao Murayama | November 28, 2021 |
While practicing tennis, Asuka recalls her father approaching her for her incomplete future academic course survey, while Yuriko Shiratori resigns as president of the student council. While planning for a graduation ceremony, Asuka and her friends go to Phoenix Academy to see the clubs there, during which they witness Yuriko in the midst of a sport referral. Yuriko challenges Asuka to a match, and they play against each other, during which Asuka recounts her time with the Tropical Club and resolves to believe in her friends. Just then, Chongire attacks with a Chou Zettai Yaraneeda, forcing the group to transform and fight it. Yuriko recounts the time she recognized Asuka as Cure Flamingo when their train was attacked. The two reconcile and promise to each other to play again, before Asuka leaves to help her friends defeat the Yaraneeda. Afterwards, Asuka and Yuriko promise to see each other at Phoenix Academy, with Asuka having filled her survey.
| 39 | "Find It! Sango's Sparkling Stage!"; Transliteration: "Mitsukete! Sango no Kirameku Sutēji!" (Japanese: みつけて！ さんごのきらめく舞台(すてーじ)！) | Takao Iwai | Hiroyuki Yoshino | December 5, 2021 |
Sango stumbles across a fashion model audition on television and applies for it. Manatsu hears of her entry, but Sango admits that she is uncertain of what she wants to do despite wanting to follow her likes. As she progresses through the audition's rounds, she ends up helping others progress through the audition and makes it to the final round. But then, Numeri summons a Chou Zettai Yaraneeda, forcing Manatsu and her friends to leave to confront it, only to be overpowered. Sango suddenly joins her friends to fight the Yaraneeda, much to their surprise. Resolving to continue helping others, Cure Coral leads her comrades to defeat the Yaraneeda. Afterwards, despite dropping out of the audition, she decides she wants to do her best as a Pretty Cure alongside her club members.
| 40 | "Spin the Tale! Minori's New Story!"; Transliteration: "Tsumuge! Minori no Arata na Sutōrī!" (Japanese: 紡げ！ みのりの新たな物語(すとーりー)！) | Tatsuma Minamikawa | Yoshimi Narita | December 12, 2021 |
The Tropical Club makes plans for a play for the graduation ceremony, but Minori is hesitant about adapting her first story, despite suggestions from her friends. Deciding to try to edit her story based on her past experiences, she sets off to work, only to struggle with it. The next day, she heads off with her friends to find the legendary papaya, but end up searching all over town for papayas and at a fruit plantation. Minori falls into despair, but encouraged by her friends about sticking together and savoring the most important things. Just then, Elda attacks with a Chou Zettai Yaraneeda, forcing the group to transform to fight it, only to be overpowered. Minori recounts her time with her friends and resolves to continue standing by them. She then leads the others in defeating the monster, salvaging its Motivation Power, and finishing it off. Afterwards, she declares that her friends and writing are her greatest treasure.
| 41 | "Meeting Time! Gather Around, Tropical Club~!"; Transliteration: "Kaigi da yo! Toropikaru Bu, Shūgō～!" (Japanese: 会議だよ！ トロピカる部、集合～！) | Hideki Hiroshima | Masahiro Yokotani | December 19, 2021 |
The Tropical Club initiate making ideas for their play's plot, from how Manatsu met Laura and became a Pretty Cure, to chronicling how the others joined Manatsu and Laura on their adventures around the city and saving it. Meanwhile, Chongire, Elda, and Numeri recount the Pretty Cures' achievements and the situation with them and the Witch.
| 42 | "Attack! The Strongest Yaraneeda!"; Transliteration: "Shūgeki! Saikyō no Yaranēda!" (Japanese: 襲撃！最強のヤラネーダ！) | Tsuyoshi Tobita | Masahiro Yokotani | December 26, 2021 |
Preparations for the "Tropical Graduation Festival" are underway throughout the school, and the Tropical Club is putting the finishing touches on their play. But then Manatsu is swallowed by one of the strongest Yaraneeda she has faced so far.
| 43 | "Invade! The Witch's Mansion In The Ocean!"; Transliteration: "Mogurikome! Shinkai no Majo Yashiki!" (Japanese: 潜り込め！ 深海の魔女やしき！) | Takao Iwai | Masahiro Yokotani | January 9, 2022 |
Laura and the others head to the Witch's mansion in pursuit of Manatsu, who has been swallowed by a Yaraneeda. On the way, Laura learns the secret of the Legendary Pretty Cure from the Mermaid Queen. Meanwhile, Manatsu infiltrates the Witch of Delays' mansion...
| 44 | "What's Most Important To The Witch"; Transliteration: "Majo no Ichiban Daiji na Koto" (Japanese: 魔女の一番大事なこと) | Noriyo Sasaki | Masahiro Yokotani | January 16, 2022 |
The Witch of Delays has been trying to fill up the Fool's Casket, but she has forgotten what she was trying to delay. Meanwhile, Manatsu and the others learn from Laura about "the legendary Pretty Cure and the Witch's past".
| 45 | "Battle of Motivation! Shine! Tropical Paradise!"; Transliteration: "Yaru Ki Dai Kessen! Kagayake! Toropikaru Paradaisu!" (Japanese: やる気大決戦！ 輝け！トロピカルパラダイス！) | Hideki Hiroshima | Masahiro Yokotani | January 23, 2022 |
With the former villains' help, the Cures fight the Butler Yaraneeda to recover the world's Motivation Power. He seems an unstoppable enemy, but the girls vow to do what's most important right now...!
| 46 | "Tropica-Shine! Our Now!""; Transliteration: "Toropikare! Watashitachi no Ima!" (Japanese: トロピカれ！わたしたちの今！) | Yutaka Tsuchida | Masahiro Yokotani | January 30, 2022 |
Laura, who has officially been nominated as the next queen, is forced to choose between returning to Grand Ocean or staying in the human world. And then, the "Tropica Festival" begins, where the curtain finally rises on the Tropical Club's play...
