= List of Delicious Party Pretty Cure episodes =

- Season 19
- No. of episodes: 45

Release
- Original network: ANN (ABC TV, TV Asahi)
- Original release: February 6, 2022 – January 29, 2023

Series chronology
- ← Previous; Tropical-Rouge! Pretty Cure Next → Soaring Sky! Pretty Cure

Delicious Party Pretty Cure is the nineteenth television anime series in Izumi Todo's Pretty Cure franchise, produced by ABC Television and animated by Toei Animation. The series aired in Japan from February 6, 2022, to January 29, 2023, succeeding Tropical-Rouge! Pretty Cure in its time slot and succeeded by Soaring Sky! Pretty Cure. The opening theme is "Cheers! Delicious Party Pretty Cure" (Cheers！デリシャスパーティプリキュア) by Machico while the first ending theme is "Delicious Happy Days" by Chihaya Yoshitake. Starting from episode 21, "Delicious Heart" (ココロデリシャス) by Rico Sasaki is used as the second ending.

== Episode list ==
| No. | Title | Directed by | Written by | Animation Director(s) | Art | Original release date |
|---|---|---|---|---|---|---|
| 1 | "Food Brings Smiles! Transform! Cure Precious!"; Transliteration: "Gohan wa Egao♡Henshin! Kyua Pureshasu" (Japanese: ごはんは笑顔♡変身！キュアプレシャス) | Toshinori Fukasawa | Sawako Hirabayashi | Akira Inagami | Rie Iida | February 6, 2022 |
Yui Nagomi is a middle school student living in Oishiina Town who loves to eat. One day, she meets Rosemary and a fox fairy named Kome-Kome, who are from CooKingdom and seek to recover the Recipe Book from the evil Bundoru Gang. When Gentlu, a member of the Bundoru Gang, attacks the town, Yui gains the power to transform into Cure Precious and decides to fight against them.
| 2 | "Goodbye, Yui......! Mari-chan's Decision"; Transliteration: "Sayōnara, Yui...! Mari-chan no Ketsui" (Japanese: さようなら、ゆい。。。！マリちゃんの決意) | Tatsuma Minamikawa | Sawako Hirabayashi | Nobuhito Akada & Kenji Miuma | Daigoro Yamaguchi & Rika Uehara | February 13, 2022 |
After losing his powers as a result of his Delicious Stone being broken, Rosemary decides to keep Yui from fighting for her safety, despite her wanting to help him.
| 3 | "Kome-Kome's Errand! Lost Baby Commotion!"; Transliteration: "Kome-Kome no Otsukai! Maigo de Ōsōdō!!" (Japanese: コメコメのおつかい！まいごで大騒動！！) | Directed by : Kimiharu Mutō; Storyboarded by : Yukio Kaizawa | Sawako Hirabayashi | Yūko Ebara | Nagisa Nishida | February 20, 2022 |
Kome-Kome decides to go on an errand by herself to impress Yui, and while in town she meets Kokone Fuwa. Meanwhile, Yui, Rosemary, and Pam-Pam look for Kome-Kome, and when they find her and bring her home, she transforms into a human baby.
| 4 | "Growing Desire... Birth of Cure Spicy!"; Transliteration: "Fukuramu, Kono Omoi... Kyua Supaishī Tanjō!" (Japanese: ふくらむ、この想い。。。キュアスパイシー誕生！) | Yui Komatsu | Sawako Hirabayashi | Mikio Fujiwara | Lee Beom-seon | February 27, 2022 |
Yui begins her first day of school and is put in the same class as Kokone Fuwa, who rarely socializes with other students. When Gentlu attacks using three Recipepes to summon a stronger Ubauzo, Kokone ends up following Rosemary into the Delicious Field and witnesses Yui battling the Ubauzo. After Kokone gains the power to transform into Cure Spicy, she works with Yui to defeat the monster.
| 5 | "I Want to Get Close to Them...! Kokone's First Friends!"; Transliteration: "Nakayoku Naritai no ni...! Kokone, Hajimete no Otomodachi!" (Japanese: なかよくなりたいのに。。。！ここね、初めてのおともだち！) | Directed by : Takao Iwai; Storyboarded by : Hajime Katoki | Kaori Kaneko | Francis Caneda, Joey Calangian & Hiroshi Numata | Natsuko Tosugi | March 6, 2022 |
Yui decides to help Kokone overcome her shyness by inviting her and Rosemary over to make lunch with her.
| 6 | "School! Monster! Big Panic!? Target: Fried Prawn!"; Transliteration: "Gakkō! Kaibutsu! Dai Panikku!? Nerawareta Ebifurai!" (Japanese: 学校！怪物！大パニック！？ねらわれたエビフライ！) | Directed by : Hideki Hiroshima; Storyboarded by : Toshiaki Komura | Junpei Yamaoka | Mitsuru Aoyama | Arisa Taira | April 17, 2022 (Note: This episode was originally scheduled to air on March 13, 2022, but the series' schedule was delayed until April 17, 2022, shortly after Toei Animation revealed their internal servers had been hacked by an unauthorized third party.) |
Pam-Pam follows Kokone to school out of concern for her, but becomes the source of rumors stating a monster is lurking in the home economics classroom.
| 7 | "Hot Passion! Shine: Cure Yum-Yum!!"; Transliteration: "Tsuyobi no Jōnetsu! Kirameite Kyua Yamuyamu!!" (Japanese: 強火の情熱！きらめいてキュアヤムヤム！！) | Directed by : Yutaka Tsuchida & Hana Shinohara; Storyboarded by : Yukio Kaizawa | Sawako Hirabayashi | Yukio Kaizawa & Ken Ueno | Miki Imai | April 24, 2022 |
While visiting Panda Hut with her friends, Yui meets a girl named Ran Hanamichi, who wants to meet the Recipepes and starts a discount promo campaign at her family's restaurant. When Gentlu attacks, Ran gains the power to transform into Cure Yum-Yum and defeat the Ubauzo.
| 8 | "Chururin Retires!? Off To Oishiina Town!"; Transliteration: "Chururin Sotsugyō!? Odekake! Oishiina Taun" (Japanese: ちゅるりん卒業！？おでかけ！おいしーなタウン) | Directed by : Michihiro Satō & Takao Iwai; Storyboarded by : Yasushi Shibue | Chiaki Nagai | Sato Michihiro & Iwai Takao | Lee Beom-seon | May 1, 2022 |
Ran learns that the Bundoru Gang has been using her posts on CureSta to track the location of Recipepes. During a tour in Oishiina Town, she reveals she will stop using CureSta. In the end, Gentlu is discovered to be Amane Kasai, the student council's president, who is under the Bundoru Gang's control.
| 9 | "Disagreement Between The Two Girls? Combination of Kokone and Ran!"; Transliteration: "Kamiawanai Futari? Kokone to Ran no Awase Miso!" (Japanese: かみ合わないふたり？ここねとらんの合わせ味噌！) | Ryuta Kawahara | Kaori Kaneko | Mika Hironaka & Kenji Miuma | Natsuko Tosugi | May 8, 2022 |
While Kokone and Ran struggle to get along due to their different preferences in food, Yui plans to host a takoyaki party to help them make up.
| 10 | "Don't Cry, Recipepe... Birth! Heart Juicy Mixer"; Transliteration: "Nakanaide Reshipippi... Tanjō! Hāto Jūshī Mikisā" (Japanese: 泣かないでレシピッピ...誕生！ハートジューシーミキサー) | Directed by : Tsuyoshi Tobita; Storyboarded by : Koji Ogawa | Sawako Hirabayashi | Nishiki Itaoka, Akira Inagami & Yukiko Ueda | Arisa Taira | May 15, 2022 |
After Gentlu gains the ability to summon a stronger Ubauzo, the Cures struggle to defeat it until they gain a new power.
| 11 | "Gentlu's Trap! Big Trouble With Yui And Ran's Test!?"; Transliteration: "Jentorū no Wana! Yui to Ran, Tesuto de Dai Pinchi!?" (Japanese: ジェントルーの罠！ゆいとらん、テストで大ピンチ！？) | Directed by : Kimiharu Mutou; Storyboarded by : Tatsuya Ishiguro | Junpei Yamaoka | Yuko Ebara & Rino Murayama | Miki Azuma | May 22, 2022 |
Amane assigns Yui and Ran extra assignments after they fail an exam, and they are unable to fight when Gentlu attacks. They soon discover Gentlu's true identity before she is taken away.
| 12 | "A Teaspoon Of Hope! Gentlu's Heart"; Transliteration: "Kosaji Ippai no Kibō! Jentorū no Hontō no Kokoro" (Japanese: 小さじ一杯の希望！ジェントルーの本当の心) | Directed by : Kana Shinohara; Storyboarded by : Teruo Satou | Sawako Hirabayashi | Mikio Fujiwara | Lee Beom-seon | May 29, 2022 |
After learning of Gentlu's true identity as Amane, the Cures go to fight her in hopes of saving her, but the Bundoru Gang has strengthened their control over her. Despite this, the Cures eventually succeed and free Amane from her brainwashing.
| 13 | "Protect Their Stolen Memories! Takumi's Secret"; Transliteration: "Ubawareta Omoide wo Mamore! Akasareru Takumi no Himitsu" (Japanese: うばわれた思い出を守れ！明かされる拓海のヒミツ) | Junji Shimizu | Kaori Kaneko | Hiroshi Numata & Caneda Francis | Natsuko Tosugi | June 5, 2022 |
Yui's childhood friend Takumi Shinada is suspicious of Rosemary, believing he is connected to the Ubauzo attacks. When Narcistoru, a new general from the Bundoru Gang, attacks and reveals his ability to steal memories associated with food, Takumi decides to aid the Cures as Black Pepper using the Delicious Stone's power.
| 14 | "First Love's Taste? Affections And Takumi's Answer"; Transliteration: "Hatsukoi tte Don'na Aji? Koisuru Kimochi to Takumi no Kotae" (Japanese: 初恋ってどんな味？恋するキモチと拓海のこたえ) | Directed by : Takao Iwai; Storyboarded by : Toshiaki Komura | Chiaki Nagai | Yuka Takemori & Nobuhito Akada | Yuki Nakabayashi | June 12, 2022 |
A girl named Honma Tomoe confesses her love to Takumi, and as the Cures try to support her, Narcistoru attacks.
| 15 | "Heart Pounding! Kokone's First Picnic"; Transliteration: "Dokidoki! Kokone, Hajimete no Pikunikku!" (Japanese: ドキドキ！ここね、初めてのピクニック！) | Directed by : Kimiharu Mutou & Ryuuta Yamamoto; Storyboarded by : Michihiro Sato | Mutsumi Ito | Ken'ichi Hara, Noh Gil-bo & Yūko Ebara | Yuko Doi & Miki Azuma | June 19, 2022 |
Students of Shinsen Middle School go on a picnic, and Kokone's driver Todoroki attempts to help her overcome her shyness.
| 16 | "Ran-Ran Is Weird!? Meat Stew And A Lie"; Transliteration: "Ran Ran tte Hen...!? Nikujaga to Uso" (Japanese: らんらんって変。。。！？肉じゃがとウソ) | Directed by : Hideki Hiroshima; Storyboarded by : Yukio Kaizawa | Junpei Yamaoka | Mitsuru Aoyama | Beom Seon Lee | June 26, 2022 |
Ran's classmate Takagi Shinpei calls her "weird" over her love of food, which upsets her. Despite this, she wants to learn the reason for his behavior.
| 17 | "The Fourth Pretty Cure!? Amane's Choice"; Transliteration: "Yonin Me no Purikyua!? Amane no Sentaku" (Japanese: 4人目のプリキュア！？あまねの選択) | Directed by : Sasaki Noriyo; Storyboarded by : Takayuki Murakami | Kaori Kaneko | Ken Ueno, Kawaguchi Hiroaki, Naoki Takahashi, Katsuji Matsumoto, Jie Qiong Chen & Dong Yuan | Natsuko Tosugi | July 3, 2022 |
Amane returns to school after recovering at home from her time as Gentlu, but declares she will step down as president of the student council. Meanwhile, a mysterious object is born in CooKingdom, and the Cures try to convince Amane to join the team.
| 18 | "I Want To Become A Parfait! Shine! Cure Finale!"; Transliteration: "Watashi, Pafe ni Naritai! Kagayake! Kyua Fināre!" (Japanese: わたし、パフェになりたい！輝け！キュアフィナーレ！) | Directed by : Tsuyoshi Tobita; Storyboarded by : Koji Ogawa | Sawako Hirabayashi | Nishiki Itaoka | Yuki Nakabayashi | July 10, 2022 |
Amane is told she has the potential to become a Pretty Cure, but refuses because of her past as Gentlu. However, when Narcistoru attacks and the Cures are struggling, she awakens to her power and becomes Cure Finale.
| 19 | "Decorating With Everyone! A Gift For The Brothers"; Transliteration: "Min'na de Dekorēshon! Onīsan e no Okurimono" (Japanese: みんなでデコレーション！お兄さんへの贈りもの) | Directed by : Koshi Shigeo; Storyboarded by : Furuta Takeshi | Chiaki Nagai | Yuki Kitajima, Mutsuki Nagahama, Mami Furutoku & Shou Menglong | Yuko Doi & Miki Azuma | July 17, 2022 |
The group helps to make a birthday cake for Amane's brothers, Yuan and Mitsuki.
| 20 | "Table Manners With Amane! An Experience At A Restaurant"; Transliteration: "Amane no Manā Ressun! Akogare no Resutoran" (Japanese: あまねのマナーレッスン！憧れのレストラン) | Directed by : Takao Iwai; Storyboarded by : Tatsuma Minamikawa | Mutsumi Ito | Akira Inagami & Yukiko Ueda | Lee Beom-seon | July 24, 2022 |
Kokone invites her friends out to a restaurant owned by her parents, where Amane educates Yui and Ran about table manners.
| 21 | "Save The Taste...! Ran's Japanese Sweets Mission"; Transliteration: "Kono Aji wo Mamoritai...! Ran no Wagashi Daisakusen" (Japanese: この味を守りたい。。。！らんの和菓子大作戦) | Directed by : Ryuta Kawahara; Storyboarded by : Satoshi Nishimura | Junpei Yamaoka | Mikio Fujiwara | Natsuko Tosugi | July 31, 2022 |
Ran learns that the town's Japanese sweets shop is on the verge of closure. Wanting the store to stay open, she asks the owner if she could host an advertisement in an effort to save the shop.
| 22 | "Black-Pep Is Retiring!? Search For The Legendary Crepe"; Transliteration: "BuraPe Intai!? Densetsu no Kurēpu wo Sagase" (Japanese: ブラペ引退！？伝説のクレープを探せ) | Directed by : Hideki Hiroshima; Storyboarded by : Teruo Sato | Kaori Kaneko | Kenji Miuma, Joey Calangian & Reggie Manabatt | Zhou Jixin | August 7, 2022 |
Takumi starts to think he is interfering with the Cures' efforts in battle, and considers retiring as Black Pepper. However, after the owner of a fruit and vegetable shop tells him about the "legendary crepe", he decides to recreate its taste.
| 23 | "Is Kokone Selfish? Unforgettable Doughnut Holes"; Transliteration: "Kokone no Wagamama? Omoide no Bōru Dōnatsu" (Japanese: ここねのわがまま？思い出のボールドーナツ) | Directed by : Toshiaki Komura; Storyboarded by : Kimiharu Mutou | Mutsumi Ito | Ken'ichi Hara, Noh Gil-bo & Rino Murayama | Yuko Doi & Miki Azuma | August 14, 2022 |
After her parents cancel their business trip, Kokone struggles to interact with her parents due to an incident as a child.
| 24 | "Who Cares About Kome-Kome! A Hectic Pizza Party"; Transliteration: "KomeKome Nante Shiranai! Haran no Piza Pāti" (Japanese: コメコメなんて知らない！波乱のピザパーティ) | Kazuki Yokouchi | Junpei Yamaoka | Hiroshi Numata, Nobuhito Akada & Yuka Takemori | Lee Beom-seon | August 21, 2022 |
While Yui and Ran are studying, Pam-Pam and Kome-Kome lose a game and have an argument.
| 25 | "A New Phantom Thief!? The NikoNiko Camp-Ground!"; Transliteration: "Aratana Kaitō!? Nikoniko Kyanpu de Gowasu!" (Japanese: 新たな怪盗！？にこにこキャンプでごわす！) | Directed by : Takao Iwai; Storyboarded by : Koji Ogawa | Mutsumi Ito | Naoki Takahashi, Katsuji Matsumoto, Chen Jieqiong, Jiu Qin, Chen Lusui, Zhang Fumin | Natsuko Tosugi | August 28, 2022 |
Yui and her friends visit a campground, where they hear a rumor about something roaming the area. This turns out to be a new general of the Bundoru Gang named Spiritoru.
| 26 | "Kokone's Promise! Challenging King Green Pepper"; Transliteration: "Kokone no Yakusoku! Pīman Daiō e no Chōsen" (Japanese: ここねのやくそく！ピーマン大王への挑戦) | Yutaka Tsuchida | Kaori Kaneko | Ken Ueno | Zhou Jixin | September 4, 2022 |
Kokone and Kome-Kome set up a challenge to eat green peppers and overcome their fear of them.
| 27 | "Kome-Kome's Big Change!? Ran's Happiness Plan"; Transliteration: "Kome-Kome Daihenge!? Ran no Happī Keikaku" (Japanese: コメコメ大変化！？らんのハッピー計画) | Directed by : Hideki Hiroshima; Storyboarded by : Junji Shimizu | Mutsumi Ito | Mitsuru Aoyama | Yuko Doi & Miki Azuma | September 11, 2022 |
Ran decides to make candies shaped like soap bubbles. But after Kome-Kome meets her younger siblings Rin and Run, she decides she wants to be more human.
| 28 | "Kome-Kome's Power For Everyone...! Party Candle Tact!"; Transliteration: "Kome-Kome no Chikara wo Min'na ni...! Pāti Kyandoru Takuto!" (Japanese: コメコメの力をみんなに...！パーティキャンドルタクト！) | Directed by : Tsuyoshi Tobita; Storyboarded by : Noriyo Sasaki | Sawako Hirabayashi | Nishiki Itaoka | Lee Beom-seon | September 18, 2022 |
As the Cures struggle to fight an Ubauzo harnessing the power of the Special Delicious Stone, Pam-Pam realizes Kome-Kome may have a hidden power within her.
| 29 | "A Delicious Paradise! Let's Go! CooKingdom!"; Transliteration: "Oishī Paradaisu! Rettsu Gō! Kukkingudamu!" (Japanese: おいしいパラダイス！レッツゴー！クッキングダム！) | Ryuta Kawahara | Junpei Yamaoka | Akira Inagami & Yukiko Ueda | Natsuko Tosugi | September 25, 2022 |
Yui and her friends visit CooKingdom with Narcistoru, where they meet an apprentice to the Cook Fighters named Cerfeuil.
| 30 | "Festival, Here We Go! Mari-chan's Fried Noodles"; Transliteration: "Omatsuri Wasshoi! Yakisoba Mari-chan" (Japanese: おまつりわっしょい！やきそばマリちゃん) | Directed by : Yasumi Mikamoto; Storyboarded by : Toshiaki Komura | Yuki Tanihata | Yuki Kitajima | Zhou Jixin | October 2, 2022 |
After Rosemary spends all his currency on food, he and the girls set up a fried noodle stand at the festival and aim to win a competition.
| 31 | "A Holiday In Oishiina Town: Princess Yui!?"; Transliteration: "Oishīna Taun no Kyūjitsu Purinsesu Yui!?" (Japanese: おいしーなタウンの休日プリンセスゆい！？) | Yuriko Kado | Sawako Hirabayashi | Mikio Fujiwara | Yuko Doi & Miki Azuma | October 9, 2022 |
Princess Maira, who comes from the island of Isuki visits Oishiina Town, and Yui realizes they look alike. Yui suggests that she and Maira switch places so she can enjoy Oishiina Town, but then Maira's older cousin Sanza kidnaps Yui.
| 32 | "Slurp It! Noodle Fest: Find The Lost Udon!"; Transliteration: "Susure! Churu Fesu Maigo no Udon wo Sagase!" (Japanese: すすれ！ちゅるフェスまいごのうどんを探せ！) | Directed by : Takao Iwai; Storyboarded by : Takayuki Murakami | Chiaki Nagai | Joey Calangian & Reggie Manabatt | Lee Beom-seon | October 16, 2022 |
A noodle festival is being held in Oishiina Town, but then the Udon Recipepe goes missing.
| 33 | "Pure And Proper! Amane And A Halloween Party"; Transliteration: "Kiyoku Tadashiku! Amane To Harowin Pāti" (Japanese: 清く正しく！あまねとハロウィンパーティ) | Junji Shimizu | Chiaki Nagai | Hiroshi Numata, Nobuhito Akada & Kenji Miuma | Natsuko Tosugi | October 23, 2022 |
While Rosemary and the girls plan a Halloween party, he brings up Narcistoru, causing Amane to have a nightmare. As a result, she breaks up with the Parfait Recipepe and loses the ability to transform into Cure Finale.
| 34 | "Stubborn Grandpa! Oden After Baseball"; Transliteration: "Ojīchan wa Ganko! Oden wa Yakyū no Ato de" (Japanese: おじいちゃんはガンコ！おでんは野球のあとで) | Directed by : Kimiharu Mutou; Storyboarded by : Ryuta Kawahara | Kaori Kaneko | Ken'ichi Hara, Noh Gil-bo & Rino Murayama | Yuri Takaki | October 30, 2022 |
Matasaburo, a chef who once worked in Oishiina Town, visits the Nagomi Diner. However, his grandson, Kosuke, struggles to get along with him due to his dream of being a baseball player.
| 35 | "Farewell to Kokone?! Feelings to Share Now"; Transliteration: "Kokone to Owakare!? Ima, Wakeaitai Omoi" (Japanese: ここねとお別れ！？いま、分け合いたい想い) | Yutaka Tsuchida | Mutsumi Ito | Ken Ueno | Yuko Doi & Miki Azuma | November 13, 2022 |
Kokone's parents receive a job offer from Isuki Island, but Kokone is afraid of leaving her friends.
| 36 | "Ran's Debut!? Shining Gourmet Emotion!"; Transliteration: "Ran ga Debyū!? Kirameku Gurume Emōshon!" (Japanese: らんがデビュー！？きらめくグルメ・エモーション!) | Kazuki Yokouchi | Junpei Yamaoka | Mitsuru Aoyama | Lee Beom-seon | November 20, 2022 |
Reporters interview Panda Hut, and Gal Sone and gourmet influencer Tatemotte appear on the show as reporters.
| 37 | "Suspicious Figure... Amane's Finale At The School Cultural Festival!"; Transliteration: "Hisomu Ayashī Kage... Amane no Bunka Matsuri Fināre!" (Japanese: ひそむ怪しい影...あまねの文化祭フィナーレ！) | Directed by : Hideki Hiroshima; Storyboarded by : Shouji Nishida | Kaori Kaneko | Naoki Takahashi, Katsuji Matsumoto, Chen Jieqiong, Qiu Jin & Chen Qiang | Natsuko Tosugi | November 27, 2022 |
Amane prepares to hold her last cultural festival as student council president, but then thinks she sees Narcistoru.
| 38 | "Meet Grandma!? Rice Balls And The Future's Baton"; Transliteration: "Obāchan ni Aeru!? Omusubi to Mirai e no Baton" (Japanese: おばあちゃんに会える！？おむすびと未来へのバトン) | Directed by : Yui Komatsu; Storyboarded by : Ryuta Kawahara & Masao Suzuki | Sawako Hirabayashi | Akira Inagami & Yukiko Ueda | Yuri Takaki | December 4, 2022 |
The Cures travel back in time 20 years using Kome-Kome's power to learn the truth about Ginger.
| 39 | "No Need To Cook!? How To Draw Smiles With Food"; Transliteration: "Oryouri Nante Shinakute Ii!? Oishii Egao no Tsukurikata" (Japanese: お料理なんてしなくていい!? おいしい笑顔の作り方) | Directed by : Takao Iwai; Storyboarded by : Toshiaki Komura | Sawako Hirabayashi | Mikio Fujiwara | Yuko Doi & Miki Azuma | December 11, 2022 |
Yui tries to help Wakana, a member of the soccer club, make lunches.
| 40 | "What I Can Do... Black Pepper And Takumi's Decision"; Transliteration: "Ore ni Dekiru Koto... Burakku Peppā to Takumi no Ketsudan" (Japanese: 俺に出来ること...ブラックペッパーと拓海の決断) | Ryuta Kawahara | Kaori Kaneko | Yuka Takemori & Mika Hironaka | Lee Beom-seon | December 18, 2022 |
Rosemary learns that Monpei is Cinnamon, and Monpei asks Takumi to return his Delicious Stone. However, Takumi is unwilling to since he wants to support the Cures as Black Pepper.
| 41 | "Merry Christmas! Something Fennel Holds Dear"; Transliteration: "Merī Kurisumasu! Fen'neru no Taisetsu na Mono" (Japanese: メリークリスマス！フェンネルの大切なもの) | Junji Shimizu | Mutsumi Ito | Nobuto Akada, Joey Calangian & Reggie Manabatt | Natsuko Tosugi | December 25, 2022 |
Yui goes out with her father Hikaru to celebrate Christmas while Fennel visits Oishiina Town.
| 42 | "Godatz's Scheme. Precious vs. Black Pepper"; Transliteration: "Gōdattsu no Takurami: Pureshasu vs. Burakku Peppā" (Japanese: ゴーダッツのたくらみ プレシャス vs. ブラックペッパー) | Directed by : Kana Shinohara; Storyboarded by : Iwao Teraoka, Yuriko Kado & Kana Shinohara | Junpei Yamaoka | Hitomi Matsuura | Yuri Takaki | January 8, 2023 |
Fennel has revealed himself as Godatz, and the Cures struggle to fight against him.
| 43 | "Activating The Recipe-Bon! A Crisis In Oishiina Town"; Transliteration: "Reshipi Bon Hatsudō! Oishīna Taun no Kiki" (Japanese: レシピボン発動！おいしーなタウンの危機) | Kazuki Yokouchi | Sawako Hirabayashi | Kenji Miuma & Hiroshi Numata | Zhou Jixin | January 15, 2023 |
As Yui blames herself for causing Kome-Kome and Takumi to be hurt, Godatz activates the Recipe-Bon to eliminate all food.
| 44 | "Sharin' Energy! With Many Thanks"; Transliteration: "Shearin Enajī! Arigatō o Kasanete" (Japanese: シェアリンエナジー！ありがとうを重ねて) | Directed by : Toshinori Fukasawa; Storyboarded by : Toshinori Fukasawa & Emi Tezuka | Sawako Hirabayashi | Nishiki Itaoka, Mikio Fujiwara & Kyoko Yufu | Lee Beom-seon | January 22, 2023 |
Yui travels to the Bundoru Gang's headquarters for the final battle with Godatz.
| 45 | "Delicious Smile~! Gather 'Round, Everyone! Bon Appétit!!"; Transliteration: "Derishasumairu! Min'na Atsumare! Itadakimasu!!" (Japanese: デリシャスマイル～！みんなあつまれ！いただきます！！) | Takayuki Murakami | Mutsumi Ito | Ken Ueno & Kyoko Yufu | Natsuko Tosugi | January 29, 2023 |
After the final battle, the Recipepes are freed and Oishiina Town holds a festival to celebrate.
