= List of Soaring Sky! Pretty Cure episodes =

- Season 20
- No. of episodes: 50

Release
- Original network: ANN (ABC TV, TV Asahi)
- Original release: February 5, 2023 – January 28, 2024

Series chronology
- ← Previous; Delicious Party Pretty Cure Next → Wonderful Pretty Cure!

Soaring Sky! Pretty Cure is the twentieth television anime series in Izumi Todo's Pretty Cure franchise, produced by Toei Animation. The series began airing in Japan on February 5, 2023, succeeding Delicious Party Pretty Cure in its time slot and succeeded by Wonderful Pretty Cure!. Ami Ishii performs the series' opening theme "Soaring Sky! Pretty Cure: Hero Girls" (Japanese: ひろがるスカイ！プリキュア ～Hero Girls～, Hepburn: Hirogaru Sukai! Purikyua: Hero Girls) and the ending theme "Hirogarhythm" (ヒロガリズム, Hirogarizumu) along with Chihaya Yoshitake; Yoshitake also performs the second ending theme, "Dear Shine Sky". Erika Fukasawa composes the music for the series.

== Episodes ==
No.	Title	Directed by	Written by	Animation Director(s)	Art	Original release date
1	"I'm A Hero Girl!? Cure Sky To The Rescue!!"; Transliteration: "Watashi ga Hīrō Gāru!? Kyua Sukai Sanjō!!" (Japanese: わたしがヒーローガール！？キュアスカイ参上！！)	Koji Ogawa	Ryunosuke Kingetsu	Keisuke Katayama	Aya Kadoguchi	February 5, 2023
Sora Harewataru, a resident of Skyland who aspires to be a hero, arrives on its mainland as the birthday of its princess, Ellee, is being celebrated. When Kabaton, a general of the Underg Empire, attempts to kidnap her, Sora intervenes and follows Kabaton as he enters another dimension. Meanwhile, a girl named Mashiro Nijigaoka finds a notebook with Skyland script and witnesses Sora fall from the sky. Sora learns that she is in an unfamiliar city and that Kabaton has followed her there. A battle ensues, but Sora falters until she discovers her powers when Kabaton destroys her notebook. A pen appears before her and she becomes Cure Sky with Ellee's power, allowing her to defeat the Ranborg that Kabaton summoned from an excavator. When Mashiro asks if Sora is a hero, she does not have an answer despite wanting to be a hero when she arrived in Skyland.
2	"A Hero In The House!?"; Transliteration: "Hīrō ga Ouchi ni Yattekita!?" (Japanese: ヒーローがおうちにやってきた！？)	Noriyo Sasaki	Ryunosuke Kingetsu	Katsumi Tamegai and Risa Miyatani	Yuko Doi	February 12, 2023
Sora and Mashiro become the center of attention following the fight with the Ranborg, and Mashiro decides they should hide at her grandmother's house. However, Yoyo is not surprised upon seeing Sora and Ellee, and lets them stay at her house. The next day, Yoyo asks Mashiro to go shopping, and she and Sora go to Sorashido Mall. Sora gets herself a new outfit and reveals some of her past: she decided to become a hero after an incident that occurred when she was young, when someone saved her after she wandered into a forbidden forest. Suddenly, Kabaton appears and demands to know where Elle is. He summons a Ranborg from a vending machine, but Sora defeats it; afterwards, Mashiro takes her to the Pretty Holic store to buy her a new notebook.
3	"Hic-Hic Homesick! Don't Cry, Ellee!"; Transliteration: "Shikushiku Hōmushikku! Nakanaide, Eru-Chan!" (Japanese: シクシクホームシック！泣かないでエルちゃん！)	Directed by : Takao Iwai; Storyboarded by : Toshiaki Komura	Konomi Shugo	Mitsuru Aoyama	Yuri Takagi	February 19, 2023
Mashiro is talking to her parents via video call when Ellee starts crying, and she and Sora deduce she is homesick after unsuccessfully trying to cheer her up. Yoyo asks them to get her a Sky Jewel, as its energy is needed to power the Mirror Pad and contact Skyland, and also reveals that she is from Skyland. They eventually find the Sky Jewel on the hill behind the Nijigaoka mansion, but they attract Kabaton's attention and he summons a Ranborg from a bamboo tree to attack them, which Sora defeats after escorting Mashiro and Ellee to safety. At home, Yoyo contacts Skyland and everyone learns that Ellee is the princess.
4	"I'm A Hero Girl Too! Cure Prism's Arrival!"; Transliteration: "Watashi mo Hīrō Gāru! Kyua Purizumu Tōjō!!" (Japanese: わたしもヒーローガール！キュアプリズム登場！！)	Tsuyoshi Tobita	Ryunosuke Kingetsu	Seiji Masuda	Zhuxing Xu	February 26, 2023
Mashiro's friend Ageha Hijiri visits the Nijigaoka house and meets Sora. The Cures tell each other about their past, with Ageha being Mashiro's childhood friend whose family moved to another town because of her mother's new job. She explains that she returned to Sorashido City to enroll in Sorashido Welfare and Nursery Vocational School and study to become a nursery school teacher. Mashiro begins to panic as she has no plans for the future. Suddenly, she sees a piglet walking into a trap and deduces that it is a trap Kabaton set up, but Sora falls for it. Kabaton steals Sora's Mirage Pen and summons another Ranborg from a mushroom to capture her, which Ageha witnesses. The girls hide in the school building as another, smaller Ranborg chases them. They end up on the roof, where Mashiro's desire to save Sora causes another Mirage Pen to appear and allows her to transform into Cure Prism. She manages to free Sora and they defeat the Ranborgs.
5	"Hand In Hand! Our New Attack!"; Transliteration: "Te to Te o Tsunaide! Watashi-tachi no Atarashī Waza!" (Japanese: 手と手をつないで！私たちの新しい技！)	Yutaka Tsuchida	Ryunosuke Kingetsu	Akira Inagami	Natsuko Tosugi	March 5, 2023
Ever since Mashiro became a Pretty Cure, Sora has experienced a nightmare involving them and seeing Mashiro suffer. Yoyo reveals to them the legend of the Pretty Cure who saved Skyland long ago, and Mashiro decides to train. Feeling anxious and wanting to protect Mashiro, Sora asks her not to transform anymore. However, having eaten a lot of oden to build energy, Kabaton summons a stronger Ranborg from a train to attack the townspeople. Sora initially decides to fight alone, but Mashiro transforms to help her. During the battle, Sky explains that she is worried about Prism, prompting her to find another word to describe their relationship, which turns out to be "friends". After sensing their strong feelings, Ellee gives them new Sky Tones, allowing them to defeat the Ranborg with their new attack, Updraft Shining.
6	"Tell Me! Sora's True Feelings"; Transliteration: "Tsutaete! Sora no Hontō no Kimochi" (Japanese: 伝えて！ソラの本当の気持ち)	Directed by : Hideaki Hiroshima; Storyboarded by : Junji Shimizu	Konomi Shugo	Hiroshi Numata, Joey Calangian, and Reggie Manabat	Yuko Doi	March 12, 2023
As Mashiro goes to school at Sorashido Academy, Sora accompanies her but is not allowed in because outsiders are not allowed to attend school. She returns home to take care of the house for Yoyo, and upon finishing her tasks waits for Mashiro to return. She confides in Yoyo that she thinks she is a burden to others because she relies on them, but Yoyo encourages her by saying that she is hardworking and asks her to go shopping. Along the way, Ageha meets up with Sora again and learns she is lonely without Mashiro. With her encouragement, Sora gains the courage to tell Mashiro her true feelings. Despite taking several detours along the way to help others, she eventually arrives at Sorashido Academy and confesses to Mashiro that she is lonely and wants to be with her. Kabaton summons a Ranborg from a construction helmet, but the Cures defeat it with Updraft Shining. As Kabaton retreats, Sora asks Mashiro to spend more time with her, and at home Yoyo enrolls Sora into Sorashido Academy.
7	"Heart-pounding! The Transfer Student Is A Hero Girl"; Transliteration: "Doki-doki! Tenkōsei wa Hīrō Gāru" (Japanese: ドキドキ！転校生はヒーローガール)	Yuriko Kado	Kan'ichi Katō	Yuka Takemori and Nobuhito Akada	Yuri Takagi	March 19, 2023
Sora begins attending Sorashido Academy, with Yoyo claiming she is an overseas transfer student to hide her origins. After accidentally telling Mashiro's friends she is from Skyland, she decides to avoid standing out so people do not ask questions. Despite worrying that she cannot befriend others, with Mashiro's encouragement, she opens up to her friends, who are eager to learn from her. Mashiro then takes Sora to view the cherry blossom tree and tells her that she had a similar experience when she first enrolled in Sorashido Academy, as she was nervous and shy but eventually opened up to others. She tells Sora to be herself, and with her advice, Sora can redo her greeting, telling her classmates that she tried to fit in, but wants them to know her true self as someone who aspires to be a hero. Suddenly, they hear from students of another transfer student: a punk with a mohawk who eats a lot. Sora and Mashiro conclude he is Kabaton and go to confront him as he summons a Ranborg from the school's cherry blossom tree, but they defeat it with Updraft Shining. Afterwards, Mashiro's friends offer to walk home with Sora and Mashiro.
8	"The Flightless Bird and The Strange Boy"; Transliteration: "Tobenai Tori To, Fushigi na Shōnen" (Japanese: 飛べない鳥と、ふしぎな少年)	Directed by : Takao Iwai; Storyboarded by : Masayoshi Nishida	Ryunosuke Kingetsu	Ken Ueno	Zhuxing Xu	March 26, 2023
At Yoyo's house, a bird named Tsubasa changes to human form to help Ellee when she falls, but hides from Sora when she enters the room. Sora believes that someone was in her room with Ellee, and at night, Tsubasa encounters Sora in her room. The next day, he introduces himself to the group and reveals that he is from Skyland's Puni Bird Tribe: a tribe of bird-like fairies who traded the ability to fly for the ability to become humans. He sought to find a way to fly despite this, but one day he fell through a tunnel during a storm and landed in Sorashido City, where Yoyo took him in and allowed him to study aerodynamics. The next day, as Tsubasa and Sora are taking care of Ellee, Kabaton arrives with a Ranborg he summoned from a UFO toy. Sora and Mashiro transform to fight it as Tsubasa looks after Ellee, but he decides to take action and transforms into his bird form to fly after the Ranborg.
9	"Wings Of Courage, Fly Cure Wing!!"; Transliteration: "Yūki no Tsubasa, Tobe Kyua Uingu!!" (Japanese: 勇気の翼、飛べキュアウィング！！)	Kana Shinohara	Ryunosuke Kingetsu	Hitomi Matsura	Natsuko Tosugi	April 2, 2023
As the UFO Ranborg rampages in the city, Tsubasa decides to reach the Cures on foot, as he is unable to fly down. When the Ranborg captures Ellee, he infiltrates the UFO to rescue her. While evading Kabaton, Tsubasa attempts to sacrifice himself to let Ellee escape, but Ellee refuses to let him do so; she grants him a Sky Mirage, which he uses to transform into Cure Wing, allowing him to rescue Ellee and defeat the Ranborg with Wing Attack.
10	"Yum! What's The Taste of Home!?"; Transliteration: "Mumumu! Omoide no Ryōri tte Don'na Aji!?" (Japanese: むむむ！思い出の料理ってどんな味！？)	Directed by : Akira Toba; Storyboarded by : Toshiaki Komura	Kanichi Kato	Shigeki Iwasaki, Chris Ogawa, Kazuhiro Itakura, Eri Ishikawa, Hirokazu Hisayuki, and Nobutaka Oota	Yuko Doi	April 9, 2023
Following Tsubasa becoming a Cure, the Cures host a welcome party at Yoyo's house, where Tsubasa attempts to recreate "yakitai", a dish from Skyland.
11	"Awkward Pair!? Tsubasa and Ageha"; Transliteration: "Kimazui Futari！？Tsubasa to Ageha" (Japanese: 気まずい二人！？ツバサとあげは)	Noriyo Sasaki	Konomi Shugo	Mitsuru Aoyama	Yuri Takagi	April 16, 2023
Ageha takes the Cures on a trip to the mountains, where she and Tsubasa struggle to get along.
12	"Tough! Cure Sky VS Kabaton"; Transliteration: "TUEEE! Kyua Sukai Tai Kabaton" (Japanese: ツエェェェ！キュアスカイ対カバトン)	Directed by : Kenichi Domon; Storyboarded by : Shinji Itadaki	Kanichi Kato	Katsumi Tamegai and Mika Hironaka	Xu Zhuxing	April 23, 2023
Following a challenge from Kabaton, Sora trains for a final showdown with him.
13	"Deliver It! First Gift"; Transliteration: "Todokete! Hajimete no Okurimono" (Japanese: 届けて！はじめてのおくりもの)	Kenta Kushitani	Ryunosuke Kingetsu & Junpei Yamaoka	Nobutaka Ota, Shigeki Iwasaki, Ueie Ayai, Kazuhiro Itakura, Saori Hosoda, Chris Ogawa, Yuha Komura, and Hanako Mitsubachi	Natsuko Tosugi	April 30, 2023
While going to buy Ellee a new pair of shoes, Sora and Mashiro meet an old woman looking for a pair of shoes as a gift for her granddaughter.
14	"To Skyland! Reunited With The Person She Admires"; Transliteration: "Sukairando e! Akogare no Anohito to no Saikai" (Japanese: スカイランドへ！憧れのあの人との再会)	Directed by : Tsuyoshi Tobita; Storyboarded by : Teruo Satō	Ryunosuke Kingetsu	Risa Miyadani, Natsumi Sakai, and Yukiko Ueda	Shota Suzuki	May 7, 2023
After Yoyo finishes the portal to Skyland, the Cures head there and Sora reunites with Captain Shalala, who takes her in as an apprentice of the Azure Guards. However, Beryberie, a member of the Guards, doubts her abilities.
15	"A Mega Ranborg Explosion? Protect Skyland!"; Transliteration: "Chōkyodai Ranbōgu Dai Bakuhatsu!? Mamore Sukairando!" (Japanese: 超巨大ランボーグ大爆発！？守れスカイランド！)	Directed by : Hideki Hiroshima; Storyboarded by : Shinji Itadaki	Ryunosuke Kingetsu	Nobuhito Akada, Keisuke Katayama, and Hiroshi Numata	Yuri Takagi and Junko Shimada	May 14, 2023
The Cures fight to protect Skyland from Battamonda's army of Ranborgs.
16	"The Elleetaro Squad Defeats the Ogre"; Transliteration: "Erutarou Ichiza no Oni Taiji" (Japanese: えるたろう一座のおに退治)	Directed by : Takao Iwai; Storyboarded by : Toshiaki Komura	Mutsumi Ito	Yuka Takemori, Joey Calangian, and Reggie Manabat	Yuko Doi	May 21, 2023
Following Battamonda's attack on Skyland, the Cures return to Sorashido City and learn from Yoyo that they can cure the King and Queen by collecting the Kira Kira Energy of purified Ranborgs. However, Ellee is distraught over her parents being cursed, so Ageha puts on a puppet show to cheer her up.
17	"The Great Baton Pass! Mashiro's Intense Relay"; Transliteration: "Watase Saikō no Baton! Mashiro Honki no Rirē" (Japanese: わたせ最高のバトン！ましろ本気のリレー)	Morio Hatano	Mio Inoue	Seiji Masuda	Natsugo Tosugi	May 28, 2023
A sports festival is occurring at Sorashido Academy, and Sora is chosen to be captain of the team representing Mashiro's class.
18	"Exciting! The Best Nursery School Teacher, Cure Butterfly!!"; Transliteration: "Ageage! Saikyō no Hoikushi, Kyua Batafurai!!" (Japanese: アゲアゲ！最強の保育士 キュアバタフライ！！)	Kanichi Kato	Yutaka Tsuchida	Ken Ueno	Yuko Doi	June 4, 2023
At a nursery school, Ageha teaches the students about her friendship with the Pretty Cures. However, one of the children, Takeru, is not impressed and runs away, and Ageha decides to befriend him. When Battamonda attacks, her resolve allows her to become Cure Butterfly and defeat the Ranborg.
19	"Ageha and Tsubasa, Get Colorful Excited!"; Transliteration: "Ageha to Tsubasa, Karafuru ni Ageteko!" (Japanese: あげはとツバサ、カラフルにアゲてこ！)	Directed by : Mio Inoue; Storyboarded by : Yuriko Kado	Yuriko Kado	Hitomi Matsuura	Yuri Takagi and Junko Shimada	June 11, 2023
Ageha begins living at Mashiro's house and helping the Cures around the house, but Tsubasa worries that she is overworking herself.
20	"The First Step Towards Mashiro's Dream"; Transliteration: "Mashiro no Yume Saisho no Ippo" (Japanese: ましろの夢 最初の一歩)	Mutsumi Ito	Junji Shimizu	Mitsuru Aoyama	Xu Zhuxing	June 18, 2023
Natsumi, an art student and Ageha's co-worker, suggests that Mashiro enter a picture book contest, which she accepts because she wants to do so as a career.
21	"Soar! Wings of Knowledge"; Transliteration: "Hirogare! Chishiki no Tsubasa" (Japanese: ひろがれ! 知識の翼)	Directed by : Mio Inoue; Storyboarded by : Chiaki Kon	Takao Iwai	Mika Hironaka, Joey Calangian, and Reggie Manabat	Natsuko Tosugi	June 25, 2023
Yoyo invites the Cures on a trip to the highlands, where her vegetable garden is located.
22	"Battamonder's Final Strategy!"; Transliteration: "Battamondā Saigo no Hisaku!" (Japanese: バッタモンダー最後の秘策！)	Directed by : Ryunosuke Kingetsu; Storyboarded by : Noriyo Sasaki	Hideki Hiroshima	Katsumi Tamegai and Kenji Miuma	Shōta Suzuki	July 2, 2023
Following Battamonda's attack on Skyland and Shalala's disappearance, many people saw a woman who appeared to be her. However, in reality this was an illusion Battamonda created, with him having turned the real Shalala into a Ranborg after finding her in the forest. After learning this, Sora loses her will to fight and her ability to transform into a Cure.
23	"Broken Dreams and Renewed Strength!"; Transliteration: "Kudaketa Yume to, Yomigaeru Chikara" (Japanese: 砕けた夢と、よみがえる力)	Directed by : Ryunosuke Kingetsu; Storyboarded by : Koji Ogawa	Tsuyoshi Tobita	Akira Inagami	Yuri Takagi and Junko Shimada	July 9, 2023
Sora reunites with her family as the Ranborg appears in Sorashido City and the Cures battle it without her. With encouragement from her family, Sora regains her motivation and powers and assists the Cures in defeating the Ranborg. Afterwards, Shalala is saved and Skyland's King and Queen are freed from the curse.
24	"Sparkling Morning Star☆ Ellee's Secret"; Transliteration: "Kagayaku Ichiban Boshi☆ Eru-chan no Himitsu" (Japanese: 輝く一番星☆エルちゃんの秘密)	Directed by : Mutsumi Ito; Storyboarded by : Kana Shinohara	Kana Shinohara	Yukiko Ueda and Risa Miyadani	Xu Zhuxing	July 16, 2023
Following the battle with the Ranborg, a celebration is held in Skyland and Ellee's origins are revealed.
25	"Exciting! The Princess Goes To The Zoo!"; Transliteration: "Wakuwaku! Purinsesu, Dōbutsuen ni Iku!" (Japanese: ワクワク！ プリンセス、動物園に行く！)	Mio Inoue	Kenichi Domon	Seiji Masuda and Hiroshi Numata	Natsuko Tosugi	July 23, 2023
The Cures take Ellee to Sorashido Nature Park to see animals, where Minoton, a general of the Underg Empire, attacks.
26	"Take Off! Memories Connected By Airplanes"; Transliteration: "Teiku Ofu! Hikōki de Tsunagaru Omoi" (Japanese: テイクオフ！ 飛行機でつながる想い)	Kanichi Katō	Toshiaki Komura	Nobuhito Akada and Yuka Takemori	Yuri Takaki and Junko Shimada	July 30, 2023
Mashiro's parents are returning home from overseas to visit Sorashido City, so the Cures go to the airport to pick them up. While exploring the airport, they meet a girl named Shōko who has never spent time with her mother. After Shōko realizes that she has been separated from her father, the Cures help her reunite with him before her family leaves for their flight.
27	"A Wild Lesson In The Mirror Pad!?"; Transliteration: "Mirā Paddo de Wakuwaku Ressun!?" (Japanese: ミラーパッドでワクワクレッスン！？)	Directed by : Mutsumi Ito; Storyboarded by : Masayoshi Nishida	Takao Iwai	Akira Takahashi, Kaori Endo, Ayai Ueie, Yuuha Komura, Yumiko Kinoshita, Rui Yang, Chen Tingting, Wang Yuechun	Yuri Takaki and Junko Shimada	August 6, 2023
After Tsubasa finds Ellee playing with the Mirror Pad, he and the rest of the Cures are sucked inside and encounter a pig-like fairy named Pinkton, who offers them cards to train them. As the Cures choose a card, Pinkton sneezes, which switches their cards and gives them lessons opposite to their interests.
28	"Ageha's Exciting Fashion Show"; Transliteration: "Ageha no Ageage Fasshon Shō" (Japanese: あげはのアゲアゲファッションショー)	Directed by : Yoshimi Narita; Storyboarded by : Teruo Satō	Hideki Hiroshima	Ken Ueno	Xu Zhuning	August 13, 2023
Ageha reunites with her older sisters, models Maria and Kaguya Saotome, whom she has not lived with since their parents' divorce. With a fashion show coming to town, their manager, Kako, asks Ellee to perform in the show.
29	"Sora And The Missing Stuffed Animal"; Transliteration: "Sora to, Wasurerareta Nuigurumi" (Japanese: ソラと、忘れられたぬいぐるみ)	Konomi Shugo	Saiho Noro	Mitsuru Aoyama	Natsuko Tosugi	August 20, 2023
After Sora takes shelter from the rain in an abandoned house, a stuffed animal named Marron suddenly comes to life and follows her home. Despite being surprised by this, Sora decides to help it reunite with its owner.
30	"Soaring Sea! Beach Paradise!"; Transliteration: "Hirogaru Umi! Bīchi Paradaisu!" (Japanese: ひろがる海！ビーチパラダイス！)	Sasaki Noriyo	Isao Murayama	Mika Hironaka and Makoto Ozawa	Shouta Suzuki	August 27, 2023
The Cures go to the beach during summer vacation, where they teach Sora how to swim.
31	"A New Threat! Rescue Ellee!"; Transliteration: "Aratana kyōi! Eru-Chan o Torimodose!" (Japanese: 新たな脅威！ エルちゃんを取り戻せ！)	Takayuki Murakami	Ryunosuke Kingetsu	Hitomi Matsuura	Yuri Takaki and Junko Shimada	September 3, 2023
After taking pictures with Ellee at the Sorashido Photo Studio, the Cures prepare to return home when they realize she is missing, only to find that a new general named Skearhead has kidnapped her. The Cures fight him and are overpowered, but Ellee awakens her powers and transforms into Cure Majesty for the first time, allowing her to help the Cures defeat Skearhead. Afterwards, the Cures reunite with Ellee, who comforts Mashiro for her failure to protect her.
32	"Big Transformation! Cure Majesty!!"; Transliteration: "Dai Henshin! Kyua Majesuti!!" (Japanese: 大変身！キュアマジェスティ！！)	Kazuki Yokouchi	Kanichi Katō	Katsumi Tamegai and Kenji Miuma	Xu Zhuxing	September 10, 2023
Following the battle with Skearhead, Ellee tells the Cures that she is Cure Majesty, but is unable to transform again. Meanwhile, Skearhead returns and sends Minoton to attack the Cures.
Movie	"Pretty Cure All Stars F"; Transliteration: "Eiga Purikyua Ōru Sutāzu F" (Japanese: 映画プリキュアオールスターズ F)	Yuta Tanaka	Jin Tanaka	Nishiki Itaoka	Ryuuta Hayashi	September 15, 2023
A film featuring Cures from Soaring Sky! Pretty Cure.
33	"The Ultimate Power! Majestic Chroniclon"; Transliteration: "Kyūkyoku no Chikara! Majesuti Kurunikurun" (Japanese: 究極のちから! マジェスティクルニクルン)	Morio Hatano	Ryunosuke Kingetsu	Akira Inagami and Keisuke Katayama	Natsuko Tosugi	September 17, 2023
Yoyo informs the Cures of an ancient ruin that has appeared in Skyland, which they go to investigate. There, they find an item called the Majestic Chroniclon.
34	"Mon-Mon! Mashiro And His Return"; Transliteration: "Mon-Mon! Mashiro to Kaette Kita Aitsu" (Japanese: もんもん！ましろと帰ってきたアイツ)	Yutaka Tsuchida	Yoshimi Narita	Nobuhito Akada, Joey Calangian, and Reggie Manabat	Yuko Doi	September 24, 2023
After losing to the Cures, Battamonda visits Sorashido City again, disguising himself as art student "Monda". He approaches Mashiro, who has lost her confidence, and attempts to crush her dreams, only to end up inspiring her.
35	"Sora Saves The Day! Ace And Hero"; Transliteration: "Suketto Sora! Ēsu to Hīrō" (Japanese: 助っ人ソラ! エースとヒーロー)	Directed by : Mio Inoue; Storyboarded by : Masao Suzuki	Tsuyoshi Tobita	Yukiko Ueda and Risa Miyadani	Junko Shimada and Yuki Nakabayashi	October 1, 2023
At the request of Kaname Ogi, the baseball club's catcher, Sora is asked to be the coach of the girls' baseball team after their captain Tamaki Shinomiya withdraws due to needing surgery for an elbow injury. While Tamaki recovers, Sora must help them win a tournament.
36	"Ageha Fails At Being The Best Nursery School Teacher!?"; Transliteration: "Ageha, Saikyō no Hoikushi Shikkaku!?" (Japanese: あげは、 最強の保育士失格!?)	Directed by : Mutsumi Ito; Storyboarded by : Chiaki Kon	Takao Iwai	Hiroshi Numata and Yuka Takemori	Xu Zhuxing	October 8, 2023
Takeru, the nursery school student whom Ageha befriended, is moving away, causing her to be distressed and refuse to play with other students.
37	"Two Friends and The Tree of Memories!"; Transliteration: "Futari wa Nakayoshi Omoide no Ki!" (Japanese: ふたりは仲良し思い出の木！)	Kanichi Katō	Takumi Shibata	Seiji Masuda	Natsuko Tosugi	October 15, 2023
After the Cures look at photos from when Mashiro and Ageha first met, they try to find the tree from a picture of them together.
38	"Save The Sky! The Secret Of The Floating Island"; Transliteration: "Ōzora o Sukue! Ukishima no Himitsu" (Japanese: 大空を救え！浮き島のひみつ)	Isao Murayama	Kana Shinohara	Mitsuru Aoyama	Shōta Suzuki	October 22, 2023
After the Bright Jewel that illuminates Skyland's night sky goes dark, the Cures go to investigate.
39	"Great Witch Yoyo and the Halloween Party!"; Transliteration: "Dai Majo Yoyo to Harowin Pātī!" (Japanese: 大魔女ヨヨとハロウィンパーティー！)	Saiho Noro	Mio Inoue	Mika Hironaka and Makoto Ozawa	Junko Shimada and Yuki Nakabayashi	October 29, 2023
While the Cures decorate Mashiro's house to welcome children on Halloween, Battamonda disguises himself as Cure Pumpkin, claiming to be a member of the Pretty Cures.
40	"Good Friends! Ellee's Wedding"; Transliteration: "Nakayochi! Eru-Chan Kekkonshiki" (Japanese: なかよち! エルちゃん結婚式)	Directed by : Mutsumi Ito; Storyboarded by : Toshiaki Komura	Takao Iwai	Ken Ueno	Xu Zhuxing	November 12, 2023
After seeing a wedding on TV, Ellee puts on a pretend wedding with Tsubasa as her husband.
41	"Mashiro and Monda's Autumn Story"; Transliteration: "Mashiro to Monda no Aki Monogatari" (Japanese: ましろと紋田の秋物語)	Directed by : Yoshimi Narita; Storyboarded by : Chiaki Kon	Hideki Hiroshima	Hitomi Matsuura	Natsuko Tosugi	November 19, 2023
Mashiro is preparing to enter a picture book storytelling contest. While thinking of ideas at Sorashido Park, Monda approaches her again, but she notices that he is acting differently than before.
42	"Overcome Self-Doubt, Naive Hero!"; Transliteration: "Mayoi o Koete Mijuku na Hīrō!" (Japanese: 迷いをこえて 未熟なヒーロー！)	Directed by : Isao Murayama; Storyboarded by : Masaya Nomoto	Masao Suzuki	Keisuke Katayama and Kenji Miuma	Yuko Doi	November 26, 2023
Shalala comes to Sorashido City to report the results of Tsubasa's research into Kira Kira Energy. While spending time with her, Sora confides in her about her struggles.
43	"Prism Shine! Light Up Your Heart!"; Transliteration: "Purizumu Shain! Kokoro o Terashite!" (Japanese: プリズムシャイン！心を照らして！)	Directed by : Mio Inoue; Storyboarded by : Ryuta Kawahara	Takao Iwai	Yuka Takemori, Joey Calangian & Reggie Manabat	Yuki Nakabayashi	December 3, 2023
While working on her new picture book at Sorashido Park, Mashiro meets Monda again and shows him her work, only for him to get angry at her due to their differing opinions. After he reveals his true identity as Battamonda to her, Skearhead appears before him and offers him a final chance to defeat the Cures by using Underg Energy, although it will cost him his soul in the process. When he attacks the Cures, Mashiro can purify him with her new technique, Prism Shine.
44	"A Grown-Up Princess and the Legendary Pretty Cure"; Transliteration: "Ōkina Purinsesu to Densetsu no Purikyua" (Japanese: 大きなプリンセスと伝説のプリキュア)	Ryunosuke Kingetsu	Yutaka Tsuchida	Nobuhito Akada & Akita Inagami	Zhuxing Xu	December 10, 2023
The Cures go to investigate a mysterious tunnel that has appeared in Skyland, where Empress Undergu, ruler of the Undergu Empire, appears and overwhelms them with her power. Suddenly, the Majestic Chroniclon activates and sends Sora, Mashiro, and Ellee back in time 300 years, where they meet Princess Elleelain, the previous ruler of Skyland. When Empress Undergu and Emperor Undergu attack, Elleelain awakens her power and transforms into Cure Noble to protect Skyland's people.
45	"The Gentle Young Lady Of The Underg Empire"; Transliteration: "Andāgu Teikoku no Yasashī Shōjo" (Japanese: アンダーグ帝国の優しい少女)	Ryunosuke Kingetsu	Kazuki Yokouchi	Hiroshi Numata & Seiji Masuda	Natsuko Tosugi	December 17, 2023
Elleelain and Empress Undergu meet and attempt to establish peace between Skyland and the Underg Empire, but Skearhead and Emperor Undergu oppose them, believing that strength is everything. However, when Empress Undergu is injured as Emperor Undergu and Elleelain are fighting, he is convinced to help build peace.
46	"The Heroes Christmas"; Transliteration: "Hīrō-tachi no Kurisumasu" (Japanese: ヒーローたちのクリスマス)	Mutsumi Ito	Kana Shinohara	Risa Miyadani & Yukiko Ueda	Yuko Doi	December 24, 2023
As the Cures prepare for their battle against the Underg Empire, Skyland celebrates a Christmas event called Strichmas, and they plan a party to cheer everyone up.
47	"Goodbye, Morning Star! The Princess Awakens"; Transliteration: "Sayonara Ichiban Boshi! Purinsesu no Mezame!" (Japanese: さよなら一番星！プリンセスのめざめ！)	Ryuunosuke Kingetsu	Takayuki Murakami	Mitsuru Aoyama	Yuki Nakabayashi	January 7, 2024
Ellee encounters the Morning Star, which is revealed to be Princess Elleelain and gives her the power to age up into a teenager without having to transform into a Pretty Cure. She also meets Tsubasa and Ageha for the first time and discusses her last encounter with Empress Underg, revealing that she created the Majestic Chroniclon before becoming the Morning Star and watching over Skyland. Afterwards, she gives Ellee the last of her power before fading away, entrusting her to become Skyland's next princess. Later, as Skearhead attacks Skyland, the Cures fend him off as Empress Underg can save herself.
48	"Protect It, Heroes! Everyone's City!"; Transliteration: "Mamore Hīrō! Min'na no Machi!" (Japanese: 守れヒーロー！みんなの街！)	Directed by : Ryuunosuke Kingetsu; Storyboarded by : Morio Hatano	Hideki Hiroshima	Mika Hironaka, Makoto Ozawa, Joey Calangian & Reggie Manabat	Zhuxing Xu	January 14, 2024
The Cures fight to protect Skyland from Empress Undergu. Just as they are about to convince her to stop fighting, Skearhead returns and impales her before retreating to the Underg Empire.
49	"Cure Sky And The Strongest Power"; Transliteration: "Kyua Sukai to Saikyō no Chikara" (Japanese: キュアスカイと最強の力)	Ryuunosuke Kingetsu	Koji Ogawa	Nishiki Itaoka	Natsuko Tosugi	January 21, 2024
Skearhead uses Empress Undergu as bait to lure the Cures into the Underg Empire, where he reveals his true form as Darkhead and that he was responsible for murdering Emperor Undergu and manipulating Empress Undergu and her memories. As they face the final battle against him, he takes Mashiro hostage in an attempt to convince Sora to use the power of Underg Energy to save her. While Sora refuses, he forcibly possesses her, transforming her into Dark Sky. While he uses her to attack the Cures, Mashiro can purify her and heal Empress Undergu. As the Cures convince Empress Undergu to be their ally, Skearhead returns, now as a giant snake named Daijarg, and they prepare to fight him.
50	"Soaring To Infinity! Our World!"; Transliteration: "Mugen ni Hirogaru! Watashitachi no Sekai!" (Japanese: 無限にひろがる！わたしたちの世界！)	Directed by : Ryuunosuke Kingetsu; Storyboarded by : Kazuki Yokouchi & Takumi Shibata	Aiyu Oogaki	Atsushi Saitō	Ryuuta Hayashi	January 28, 2024
After rescuing Empress Undergu, the Cures face the final battle against Skearhead, who emerges from the Sea of Underg Energy having transformed into a giant snake named Daijarg and attacks Earth.
