= Delicious Party Pretty Cure =

Japanese anime television series

- Delicious Party♡Pretty Cure
- Promotional poster

デリシャスパーティ♡プリキュア (Derishasu Pāti♡Purikyua)
- Created by: Izumi Todo
- Anime television series
- Directed by: Toshinori Fukazawa
- Produced by: Fumi Yazaki; Kanako Tada; Kaori Yasumi
- Written by: Sawako Hirabayashi
- Music by: Shiho Terada
- Studio: Toei Animation
- Licensed by: Crunchyroll
- Original network: ANN (ABC TV, TV Asahi)
- Original run: February 6, 2022 – January 29, 2023
- Episodes: 45
- Manga
- Written by: Izumi Todo
- Illustrated by: Futago Kamikita
- Published by: Kodansha
- Magazine: Nakayoshi
- Original run: March 2022 – February 2023
- Volumes: 2
- Anime film

Delicious Party♡Pretty Cure the Movie: Dreaming♡Children's Lunch!
- Directed by: Akifumi Zako
- Written by: Jin Tanaka
- Studio: Toei Animation
- Released: September 23, 2022
- Runtime: 70 minutes
- Anime film

My Precious Lunch
- Directed by: Junichi Yamamoto
- Studio: Toei Animation
- Released: September 23, 2022
- Runtime: 6 minutes

Delicious Party Pretty Cure (Japanese: デリシャスパーティ♡プリキュア, Hepburn: Derishasu Pāti♡Purikyua; stylized as Delicious Party♡Precure) is a Japanese anime television series produced by Toei Animation serving as the nineteenth installment in the Pretty Cure franchise. Directed by Toshinori Fukazawa and written by Sawako Hirabayashi, it premiered on ANN on February 6, 2022, succeeding Tropical-Rouge! PreCure's time slot, and aired until January 29, 2023. The series' main themes are cuisine, cooking, gratitude, and sharing, and it is the second series to use food as its main motif after Kirakira PreCure a la Mode. It was succeeded by Soaring Sky! PreCure on February 5, 2023. A film, Delicious Party Pretty Cure: Dreaming Children's Lunch!, was released in cinemas in Japan on September 23, 2022, and on Blu-ray and DVD on January 25, 2023.

== Story ==
The Recipe-Bon (レシピボン, Reshipibon), the treasure of CooKingdom (クッキングダム, Kukkingudamu), which is responsible for making cuisines in the world, is stolen by the Bundoru Gang (ブンドル団, Bundoru Dan), a group of phantom thieves who seek to monopolize cooking for themselves by capturing the Recipepes (レシピッピ, Reshipippi), small fairies that represent dishes. To search for it, Rosemary and three Energy Fairies are sent to Earth and arrive in the food-loving Oishiina Town (おいしーなタウン, Oishīna Taun), where they meet Yui Nagomi and her friends Kokone Fuwa and Ran Hanamichi. Later joined by Amane Kasai, who was formerly Gentlu, a general of the Bundoru Gang, they become Pretty Cure to recover the Recipe-Bon from the Bundoru Gang and stop them from capturing the Recipepes.

== Characters ==
=== Pretty Cures ===
Yui Nagomi (和実ゆい, Nagomi Yui) / Cure Precious (キュアプレシャス, Kyua Pureshasu)
Voiced by: Hana Hishikawa
A 13-year-old girl and a second-year middle school student at Shinsen Middle School who loves food, especially fresh vegetables. Her family owns a diner and she is an only child who cherishes the saying "Meals bring smiling faces", the motto of her late grandmother Yone. Although she is energetic and has high stamina, she gets hungry quickly. Her catchphrases are "Delicious smile~!" (デリシャスマイル～！, Derishasumairu ~!) and "I'm hungry~!" (はらペコった～！, Hara peko tta ~!). With the power of her fairy partner Kome-Kome, she can transform into Cure Precious, whose theme color is pink and represents rice, specifically onigiri. She introduces herself by saying "Brimming with energy, from piping hot rice! Cure Precious!" (あつあつごはんで、みなぎるパワー！キュアプレシャス！, Atsuatsu Gohan de, Minagiru Pawā! Kyua Pureshasu!).
Kokone Fuwa (芙羽ここね, Fuwa Kokone) / Cure Spicy (キュアスパイシー, Kyua Supaishī)
Voiced by: Risa Shimizu
A 14-year-old girl and a second-year middle school student at Shinsen Middle School who is fashionable and loves makeup and cute things, as well as curry bread and heart-shaped bread. Her family owns a fine dining restaurant and she is an only child. Others see her as someone who is out of their league because she does not talk much and prefers to be alone. With the power of her fairy partner Pam-Pam, she can transform into Cure Spicy, whose theme color is blue and represents sandwiches. She introduces herself by saying "With a dainty sandwich, spice for your heart! Cure Spicy!" (ふわふわサンドで心にスパイス！キュアスパイシー！, Fuwafuwa Sando de Kokoro ni Supaisu! Kyua Supaishī!).
Ran Hanamichi (華満らん, Hanamichi Ran) / Cure Yum-Yum (キュアヤムヤム, Kyua Yamuyamu)
Voiced by: Yuka Iguchi
A 13/14-year-old girl and a second-year middle school student at Shinsen Middle School who loves food and posts about it on the social media platform "CureSta". She has a younger sister and brother and her family owns a ramen shop. With the power of her fairy partner Mem-Mem, she can transform into Cure Yum-Yum, whose theme color is yellow and her secondary colour is orange and represents ramen. She introduces herself by saying "Sparkling noodle emotion! Cure Yum-Yum!" (きらめくヌードル・エモーション！キュアヤムヤム！, Kirameku nūdoru・emōshon! Kyua Yamuyamu!).
Amane Kasai (菓彩 あまね, Kasai Amane) / Cure Finale (キュアフィナーレ, Kyua Fināre)
Voiced by: Ai Kayano
A 15-year-old girl and third-year middle school student at Shinsen Middle School, who is the president of its student council and has a strong sense of justice. Her family owns the fruits and cafe parlor "Fruit Parlor KASAI". She was brainwashed into becoming Gentlu (ジェントルー, Jentorū), a member of the Bundoru Gang, until the Cures free her from Godatz's control; the reason why the Bundoru Gang made her a member in the first place is because of her vast knowledge of the town. Although she initially refuses to become a Cure due to guilt over her actions as Gentlu, her resolve to make everyone smile grants her the Heart Fruits Pendant, which she uses to transform into Cure Finale, whose theme colors are gold and purple and represents parfaits. She introduces herself by saying "Sweetness in full bloom, gently and gorgeously! Cure Finale!" (ジェントルにゴージャスに、咲き誇るスウィートネス！キュアフィナーレ！, Jentoru ni Gōjasu ni, Sakihokoru Sūītonesu! Kyua Fināre!).

==== Energy Fairies ====
Kome-Kome II (コメコメ2世, Komekome Nisei)
Voiced by: Natsumi Takamori
The fox-like Energy Fairy of Rice, who gains the ability to transform into a human girl. She was born from the powers of her ancestor, Kome-Kome I.
Pam-Pam (パムパム, Pamupamu)
Voiced by: Natsumi Hioka
The dog-like Energy Fairy of Bread.
Mem-Mem (メンメン, Menmen)
Voiced by: Tomoe Hanba
The dragon-like Energy Fairy of Noodles.

=== CooKingdom ===
Rosemary (ローズマリー, Rōzumarī)
Voiced by: Tomoaki Maeno
A resident of CooKingdom who was sent to Earth in search of the Recipe-Bon. He has high beauty standards and knows cosmetology. In the past, he was one of Ginger's apprentices and received half of his Special Delicious Stone, with Fennel receiving the other half. Fennel's jealousy that he and Cinnamon were chosen over him as his apprentices drove him to become Godatz.
CooKing (クッキング, Kūkingu)
Voiced by: Takuma Suzuki
The king of CooKingdom.
CooQueen (クックイーン, Kukkuīn)
Voiced by: Emi Shinohara
The queen of CooKingdom.
Chervil (セルフィーユ, Serufīyu)
Voiced by: Minami Tsuda
An apprentice of the Cook Fighters.
Ginger (ジンジャー, Jinjā)
Voiced by: Yoshito Yasuhara
Rosemary's master, who was the leader of the Cook Fighters and a mentor to Rosemary, Cinnamon, and Fennel.
Kome-Kome I (コメコメ1世, Komekome Ichisei) / Connectal Mochimochitto Fukkurara Glycogen Komex I (コネクトル・モチモチット・フックララ・グリコーゲン・コメックス1世, Konekutoru Mochimochitto Fukkurara Gurikōgen Komekkusu Ichisei)
Voiced by: Natsumi Takamori
Kome-Kome II's ancestor, who was known for his extraordinary powers. Twenty years ago, he traveled to Oishiina Town with Ginger and the Energy Fairies. After learning from Yui and the Cures, who traveled back in time, that food and the memories associated with it would be in danger, he sacrificed himself to use his energy to protect Oishiina Town, giving birth to the current Kome-Kome.

==== Cook Fighters ====
Takumi Shinada (品田拓海, Shinada Takumi) / Black Pepper (ブラックペッパー, Burakku Peppā)
Voiced by: Yuma Uchida
Yui's childhood friend and a third-year middle school student at Shinsen Middle School, whose family runs a guest house. He inherited a Delicious Stone from his father Monpei, which allows him to transform into his alter-ego, Black Pepper.

=== Bundoru Gang ===
The series' main antagonists, the Bundoru Gang (ブンドル団, Bundoru Dan) are a group of phantom thieves who were responsible for stealing the Recipe-Bon from CooKingdom and seek to monopolize dishes for themselves by capturing the Recipepes. Gentlu was originally a member of the gang before Godatz's control over her was broken by the Cures.

==== Leaders ====
Godatz (ゴーダッツ, Gōdattsu)
Voiced by: Satoshi Mikami, Rie Kawamura (young)
The main antagonist of the series and the leader of the Bundoru Gang, who seeks to collect the Recipepes and own all types of cuisines. He is later revealed to be Fennel (フェンネル, Fen'neru), the captain of CooKingdom's imperial guard and one of Ginger's apprentices. After Ginger chose Cinnamon as his apprentice over him, his jealousy led him to become Godatz. While he transforms into a monstrous form using the two Delicious Stones to fight the Cures, he is defeated and returns to normal after losing the Stones, later being arrested for his crimes.

==== Generals ====
Secretoru (セクレトルー, Sekuretorū)
Voiced by: Sayaka Kinoshita
The second-in-command of the Bundoru Gang, who is later betrayed by Godatz.
Narcistoru (ナルシストルー, Narushisutorū)
Voiced by: Shūhei Sakaguchi
The self-proclaimed genius of the Bundoru Gang, who invents gadgets to strengthen the Ubauzo. He is later revealed to have been a resident of CooKingdom who became an outcast due to his inability to enjoy food and decided to join the Bundoru Gang. After being defeated and arrested, he later escapes from prison when Secretoru tries to attack him, but allows the Cures to send him back.
Spiritoru (スピリットルー, Supirittorū)
Voiced by: Mitsuaki Kanuka
A robot created by Narcistoru and powered by a Delicious Stone who was originally programmed with Narcistoru's tastes and was kind and cheerful. Narcistoru removes his Delicious Stone and deactivates him after his failures, but Secretoru restores him with a Special Delicious Stone and reprograms him to be serious and task-oriented. He is later reprogrammed and becomes good after realizing the value of sharing food with others.

==== Underlings ====
Mini Spiritoru (ミニスピリットルー, Mini Supirittorū)
Voiced by: Mitsuaki Kanuka
Small robots who resemble Spiritoru.

==== Monsters ====
Ubauzo (ウバウゾー, Ubauzō)
Voiced by: Soshiro Hori
The series' main monsters, whose name is derived from the phrase "to steal" (奪う, ubau). They are created by the Bundoru Gang's generals using stolen Recipepes and the Bundoru Gang's container. Upon being purified by the Cures, they say "I'm stuffed~" (オナカイッパ～イ, Onakaippai) and the stolen Recipepes are freed from the container. There are several types of upgraded Ubauzo: Gentlu's Ubauzo, which are created using an upgraded container by having her lend her power by saying ""Let me give you my power!" (何時に, 我が力を授けよう, Nanji ni, waga o sazukeyou), the Motto Ubauzo (もっとウバウゾー, Motto Ubauzō), which Narcistoru creates by fusing one or two objects, Spiritoru's Ubauzo, which are created by a cooking object and a non-cooking object, and the Gossori Ubauzo (ゴッソリウバウゾー, Gossori Ubauzō), which Secretoru creates.

=== Cures' family members ===
Akiho Nagomi (和実 あきほ, Nagomi Akiho)
Voiced by: Chie Nakamura (Episodes 1–34), Ayumi Tsunematsu (Episode 39 onwards)
Yui's mother and the owner of Nagomi Diner.
Hikaru Nagomi (和実 ひかる, Nagomi Hikaru)
Voiced by: Hidenobu Kiuchi
Yui's father, whose original name before he married Akiho was Hikaru Shioda (潮田 ひかる, Shioda Hikaru). He works as a fisherman with Monpei around the world and overseas, mainly in America.
Yone Nagomi (和実 よね, Nagomi Yone)
Voiced by: Yoshiko Miyazaki
Yui's late grandmother, who introduced the symbol of the Maneki-neko to Oishiina Town and is remembered for her proverbs and wisdom and physical strength. She is later revealed to be the series' narrator.
Hatsuko Fuwa (芙羽 はつこ, Fuwa Hatsuko)
Voiced by: Toa Yukinari
Kokone's mother.
Shousei Fuwa (芙羽 しょうせい, Fuwa Shōsei)
Voiced by: Taisuke Nakano
Kokone's father.
Kokone's Aunt (ここねの伯母, Kokone no Oba)
Voiced by: Tomoe Hanba
Kokone's aunt & Hatsuko's older sister.
Koshinosuke Hanamichi (華満 こしのすけ, Hanamichi Koshinosuke)
Voiced by: Atsushi Ono
Ran's father.
Tsurune Hanamichi (華満 つるね, Hanamichi Tsurune)
Voiced by: Ai Kobayashi
Ran's mother.
Rin Hanamichi (華満 りん, Hanamichi Rin)
Voiced by: Rie Kawamura
Ran's younger sister.
Run Hanamichi (華満 るん, Hanamichi Run)
Voiced by: Akane Yamaguchi
Ran's younger brother.
Shuichi Kasai (菓彩 しゅういち, Kasai Shūichi)
Voiced by: Keisuke Fujii
Amane's father.
Botan Kasai (菓彩 ぼたん, Kasai Botan)
Voiced by: Naomi Shindō
Amane's mother, who owns Nanpu Dessert Shop.
Yuan Kasai (菓彩 ゆあん, Kasai Yuan) & Mitsuki Kasai (菓彩 みつき, Kasai Mitsuki)
Voiced by: Toshiya Miyata
Amane's older twin brothers.

=== Shinsen Middle School ===
Wakana Tamaki (玉木 わかな, Tamaki Wakana)
Voiced by: Ikumi Hasegawa
Yui's classmate and a member of the soccer club.
Iroha Endo (遠藤 いろは, Endo Iroha), Risa Takada (高田 りさ, Takada Risa) & Ena Nagase (長瀬 えな, Nagase Ena)
Voiced by: Takako Tanaka (Iroha), Rie Kawamura (Risa) & Miyuri Shimabukuro (Ena)
Kokone's friends.
Shinpei Takagi (高木 晋平, Takagi Shinpei)
Voiced by: Noriaki Kanze
A student at Shinsen Middle School who tells lies to impress his classmates. In reality, he has been struggling since his older brother left to study, having looked after him when he was younger because their parents were busy running the family business.
Moe Yamakura (山倉 もえ, Yamakura Moe)
Voiced by: Ikumi Hasegawa
The vice president of Shinsen Middle School's student council.

=== Others ===
An Shinada (品田 あん, Shinada An)
Voiced by: Saori Ōnishi
Takumi's mother, who works at Nagomi Diner and is the owner of Fuku-An.
Monpei Shinada (品田 門平, Shinada Monpei)
Voiced by: Tetsuhiro Ikeda
Takumi's father, who works as a fisherman with Hikaru around the world. He is originally from CooKingdom, where he was known as Cinnamon (シナモン, Shinamon) and was one of Ginger's apprentices. After Fennel framed him for stealing the Recipe-Bon, he fled CooKingdom and arrived in Oishiina Town, where he met An and decided to stay and marry her. Takumi later inherited his Delicious Stone.
Todoroki (轟)
Voiced by: Shōto Kashii
Kokone's butler.
Saki Matsuyama (松山 美枝, Matsuyama Saki)
Voiced by: Roko Takizawa
An elderly lady who runs a traditional Japanese sweet shop.
Yosuke Minato (湊 陽佑, Minato Yosuke) & Asae Sakurai (櫻井 麻恵, Sakurai Asae)
Voiced by: Makoto Yasumura (Yosuke) & Rie Kawamura (Asae)
Takumi's childhood friends and acquaintances.
Takao Fujino (藤野 タカオ, Fujino Takao) & Miyako Fujino (藤野 みやこ, Fujino Miyako)
Voiced by: Ikuto Kanemasa (Takao) & Takako Tanaka (Miyako)
A married couple who run a yakisoba restaurant.
Kumamon (くまモン)
Voiced by: Himself
A guest of the "Churu Fest", an event in Oishiina Town which hosts noodles from around the world. He met Ran's father during one of his trips.
Maira Isuki (マイラ・イースキ, Maira Īsuki)
Voiced by: Azumi Waki
The princess of the distant island of Isuki, who resembles Yui. Years ago, she met Monpei, who gave her a lucky cat.
Genma Itak (ゲンマ・イースキ, Genma Ītaku)
Voiced by: Atsuki Tani
Maira's butler.
Sanza Isuki (サンザー・イースキ, Sanzā Īsuki)
Voiced by: Yuki Yonai
Maira's older cousin, who tries to oust her from the throne after deeming her incapable of being queen.
Matasaburo Asai (浅井又三郎, Asai Matasaburo)
Voiced by: Jiro Saito
An old man who occasionally returns to Oishiina Town to visit.
Kosuke Asai (浅井宏輔, Asai Kōsuke)
Voiced by: Yuki Urushiyama
Matasaburo's grandson, who dreams of becoming a professional baseball player.
Gal Sone (ギャル曽根, Gyaru Sone)
Voiced by: Herself
A Japanese competitive eater.
Hanna Tatemoto (館本飯菜, Tatemoto Hanna) / Tatemotte (たてもってぃ)
Voiced by: Emiri Katō
A gourmet influencer.
Mashiba Tamaki (玉木 ましば, Tamaki Mashiba)
Voiced by: Kōichi Sōma
Wakana's father, who has a passion for sports.
Sora Harewataru (ソラ・ハレワタール, Sora Harewatāru) / Cure Sky (キュアスカイ, Kyua Sukai)
Voiced by: Akira Sekine
The protagonist of Soaring Sky! Pretty Cure.

=== Movie Characters ===
Cait Sith (ケットシー, Ketto Shī)
Voiced by: Natsuki Hanae
The director of Dreamia and the main antagonist of Delicious Party Pretty Cure the Movie: Dreaming Children's Lunch!
Dreamia Robots (ドリーミアロボット, Dorīmia Robotto)
Voiced by: Shinji Mizuta and Kenshirō Kawanishi
The robots of Dreamia.

== Development ==
On November 4, 2021, Toei trademarked the name for the new series to be released for the 2022 season. On November 25, 2021, the series title was officially unveiled on Toei's official website. The website was later updated on January 9, 2022, with new information and a reveal of the main characters of the series. Regarding the main theme of the series, ABC Animation Producer Kanako Tada said that "Food and cooking is irreplaceable in life, and at the same time, it has many important elements that give color to everyday life. Through this work, the motto Yui Nagomi cherishes: 'Meals bring smiling faces' will surely be an important word for everyone." Toei Animation producer Yasumi Kaori also said that "Warm feelings will surely make you smile. The happiness and joy of 'sharing' smiles also opens up new smiles... With that in mind, I chose 'gratitude' and 'sharing' as the main theme, and 'food' as the center of the story."

The series also marks the debut role for Hana Hishikawa, who started her voice acting career back in 2020.

On March 11, 2022, Toei Animation announced that the series would go on hiatus, due to its production being affected by a third-party hack that tampered with the studio's files. It was later announced on March 13, 2022, that the show would be on hiatus for four weeks. On April 3, 2022, it was announced that the show would be on hiatus for at least another week. On April 6, it was announced that the show would resume airing beginning on April 17.

== Media ==
=== Anime ===
Delicious Party Pretty Cure officially aired on all ANN stations in Japan from February 6, 2022, to January 29, 2023, replacing Tropical-Rouge! Pretty Cure in its initial timeslot. Machico performed the series' opening theme "Cheers! Delicious Party♡Pretty Cure" (Cheers!デリシャスパーティ♡プリキュア, Cheers! Derishasu Pāti♡Purikyua) while Chihaya Yoshitake performed the first ending theme "Delicious Happy Days" and Rico Sasaki performed the second ending theme "Delicious Heart" (ココロデリシャス, Kokoro Derishasu). Shiho Terada (Garo) returns to compose the music for the third time. Crunchyroll streamed the series with original Japanese audio and English subtitles on the same day it premiered in Japan.

=== Films ===
A movie based on the anime, Delicious Party♡Pretty Cure the Movie: Dreaming♡Children's Lunch! (映画デリシャスパーティ♡プリキュア 夢みる♡お子さまランチ!, Eiga Derishasu Pāti♡Purikyua Yumemiru♡Okosama Rachi!), including animated short titled My Precious Lunch (わたしだけのお子さまランチ, Watashi dake no okosama ranchi), was released in Japanese movie theaters on September 23, 2022.

Pretty Cure All Stars F (映画 プリキュアオールスターズ F, Eiga Purikyua Ōrusutāzu F), was released in Japanese movie theaters on September 15, 2023.

=== Manga ===
A manga adaption series began serialization in Kodansha's Nakayoshi magazine from February 3 (March 2022 issue) to December 28, 2022 (February 2023 issue) and illustrated by Futago Kamikita.

=== Music ===
==== Opening ====
Song	Artist	Episodes
"Cheers! Delicious Party♡Pretty Cure" (Cheers!デリシャスパーティ♡プリキュア)	Machico	1 - 45

==== Endings ====
Song	Artist	Episodes
"DELICIOUS HAPPY DAYS♪"	Chihaya Yoshitake	1 - 20
"Delicious Heart" (ココロデリシャス)	Rico Sasaki	22 - 45
"Welcome, Children To♡Dreamia" (ようこそ、お子さま♡ドリーミア)	Moeha Nochimoto	27 - 30

==== Insert Song ====
Song	Artist	Episodes
"Bonds♡Specialty" (キズナ♡スペシャリティ)	Hana Hishikawa (Cure Precious), Risa Shimizu (Cure Spicy), Yuka Iguchi (Cure Yum-Yum), Ai Kayano (Cure Finale)	44

Preceded by Tropical-Rouge! Pretty Cure	Delicious Party Pretty Cure; 2022-2023	Succeeded by Soaring Sky! Pretty Cure
