= Chihaya Yoshitake =

Japanese singer and voice actress

Chihaya Yoshitake 吉武 千颯
- Born: 28 March 1999 (age 27); Hiroshima Prefecture, Japan
- Genres: J-pop
- Occupations: Singer, voice actress
- Instrument: Singing
- Years active: 2018–present

Chihaya Yoshitake (吉武 千颯, Yoshitake Chihaya; born 28 March 1999) is a Japanese singer and voice actress affiliated with Apollo Bay. She is best known for singing the ending themes for Star Twinkle PreCure, the sixteenth installment in Toei Animation's Pretty Cure franchise.

== Biography ==
Chihaya Yoshitake was born on 28 March 1999 in Hiroshima Prefecture. In 2017, She was the winner of the 2017 Anisong Stars Jury Special Award. In October 2018, she was selected as one of eight members of the "Voitama Project", and in 2019 started her activities in web content. In 2019, she sang both ending songs of Star Twinkle PreCure, Papepipu Romantic and Oshiete! Twinkle. The former charted at #20 in the Oricon Singles Charts twelve days after its release, while the latter charted at #23 twelve days after its release. She also sang Seiza no Chikara for the series' movie. In 2024, she sung the theme song for Wonderful PreCure!, Wonderful Pretty Cure! evolution!!.

== Filmography ==
=== Television animation ===
2021

- Love Live! Superstar!!, Yūna Hijirisawa

2022

- Healer Girl, Sonia Yanagi
- Lucifer and the Biscuit Hammer, Subaru Hoshikawa

2025

- Onmyō Kaiten Re:verse, Shino

=== Video games ===
2020

- Sakura Kakumei: Hanasaku Otome-tachi, Tenka Keburai

=== Anime films ===
2023

- Idol Bu Show, Ichika

== Discography ==
Title	Year	Details	Peak chart positions		Sales
Title	Year	Details	JPN	JPN Hot	Sales
Papepipu Romantic (B-side)	2019	Released: 6 March 2019; Label: Marvelous; Formats: CD	20	—	—
Oshiete...! Twinkle (A-side)	2019	Released: 7 August 2019; Label: Marvelous; Formats: CD	23	—	—
Seiza no Chikara (B-side)	2019	Released: 16 October 2019; Label: Marvelous; Formats: CD	41	—	—
"—" denotes releases that did not chart or were not released in that region.
