= List of anime franchises by episode count =

This is a list of anime series by franchise series total episode count for series with a minimum of 200 total episodes in the franchise, including television series episodes and specials, OVAs, and films. The series in the list combine all episodes in a franchise series within the original work or original text regardless of series subtitle. For example, the Doraemon (1979) anime series was split into the Doraemon (2005) anime series due to a change in the voice cast in 2005. However, when the 1979 and 2005 anime are combined, Doraemon surpasses the Sazae-san anime series for the most episodes of all time.

== Series ==
The series are listed with the highest count at the top.

No.	Title	Started Broadcasting	Finished Broadcasting	Runtime (TV)	Episode(s)(TV) (Note: Main anime series)	Other(s) (Note: OVAs, television specials, films, recap re-releases, shorts and related spin-offs)	Total count
1	Doraemon	2 Apr 1979	Ongoing	20-26 minutes	3,003	67	3,070 (Note: Includes 26 TV episodes from the 1973 series, 1787 from the 1979 series, and 1160 from the 2005 series, as well as 30 special episodes, 40 feature films, 2 special films, 14 short films, 4 Dorami-chan films, 2 Dorami-chan and Doraemons films, and 5 The Doraemons films.)
2	Sazae-san	5 Oct 1969	Ongoing	20-26 minutes	2,853		2,853+ (Note: Includes 7181 TV episodes and 11 specials (as of 2013).)
3	Nintama Rantarō	10 Apr 1993	Ongoing	10 minutes	2,199	3	2,202 (Note: There are 22 "series" which are part of the overall Nintama Rantarō series, 2 specials and 1 film (as of 20 September 2020). This page lists all the episode titles.)
4	Ojarumaru	5 Oct 1998	Ongoing	10 minutes	1,827	4	1,831 (Note: There are 1827 TV episodes and 4 films (as of 20 September 2020).)
5	Oyako Club	3 Oct 1994	30 Mar 2013	5 minutes	1,818		1,818
6	Anpanman	3 Oct 1988	Ongoing	20-26 minutes	1,587	113	1,700 (Note: There are 1587 TV episodes, 18 TV specials, 30 films in the main series, 25 additional related films, 29 Christmas Specials and 11 OVAs (as of 20 September 2020).)
7	Pokémon	1 Apr 1997	Ongoing	20–26 minutes	1,385	203	1,591 (Note: 23 feature films; Pokémon Chronicles has 16 episodes in Japanese version; 27 Pikachu shorts (but 6 of them are part of Pikachu Winter Vacation); 3 Pikachu Winter Vacation's episode; 3 television special episode (Mewtwo Returns, Pokémon: The Mastermind of Mirage Pokémon & The Legend of Thunder); Pokémon Origins has 4 episodes; Pokémon Generations has 18 episodes; Pokémon: Twilight Wings has 8 episodes; Pokémon Evolutions has 8 episodes; Pokétoon has 22 episodes; Pokémon Concierge has 8 episodes; Pokémon: Hisuian Snow has 3 episodes; Pokémon: Paldean Winds has 4 episodes; 4 episodes of "Prologue to films"; Planetarium specials has 7 episodes; Pokémon Ranger: Guardian Signs has 2 episodes; Pokémon Mystery Dungeon has 3 episodes; The Adventures of Snorlax & Cubone has 4 episodes; Hoopa's Surprise Ring Adventures has 6 episodes; The Two Professors has 3 episodes; Cube-Shaped Pokémon on Cubie Island?! has 5 episodes; Pokémon: Path to the Peak has 4 episodes; Discover Pokémon Together has 3 episodes; There are 15 special episodes from main anime series; 5 other ONAs: A Ripple in Time, Bidoof's Big Stand, Journey of Shared Dreams, Detective Pikachu & the Mystery of the Missing Flan & Chasing the Moon; 3 other shorts: Homecoming, Bubble Beam Berry Blast &Turning the Tera Tide; 1 other special episode: Pichu Bros. in Party Panic)
8	Chibi Maruko-chan	7 Jan 1990	Ongoing	20-26 minutes	1,493	64	1,557 (Note: There are 142 TV episodes from the 1990 series with 3 specials, 1351 from the 1995 series with 24 specials, 33 episodes of television drama and 4 films. (as of 20 September 2020).)
9	Manga Nippon Mukashi Banashi	7 Jan 1975	2 Jan 1995	20-26 minutes	1,494		1,494 (Note: 24 TV episodes from the 1975 series, 1470 TV episodes from the 1976 series)
10	Hoka Hoka Kazoku	1 Oct 1976	31 Mar 1982	5 minutes	1,428		1,428
11	Shimajirō	13 Dec 1993	Ongoing	8-26 minutes	1,403	8	1,411 (Note: There are 726 TV episodes in the 1993 series, 629 episodes in the 2008 series (which includes Explore!, Hesoka, and Wow), and 3 films (as of 20 September 2020).)
12	Crayon Shin-chan	13 Apr 1992	Ongoing	20-26 minutes	1,212	171	1,383 (Note: Including Super Shiro, there are 1,212 episodes, 31 films, 88 specials, and 52 ONAs (as of 18 March 2023).)
13	Case Closed	8 Jan 1996	Ongoing	20-26 minutes	1,203	52	1,255 (Note: there are 1,203 episodes, 26 films, 8 specials, 12 OVAs and 6 magic files.)
14	Yu-Gi-Oh!	4 Apr 1998	Ongoing	20-26 minutes	1,227	7	1,234 (Note: 1,227 episodes, 3 specials and 4 films (as of 9 February 2025).)
15	One Piece	20 Oct 1999	Ongoing	20-26 minutes	1,180	39	1,219 (Note: 1,180 episodes, 14 films, 4 short films, 18 specials, and 3 OVAs.)
16	Gundam	7 Apr 1979	Ongoing	20-26 minutes	899	232	1,131 (Note: 899 episodes, 25 films, 7 short films, 19 specials, 91 OVAs, and 90 ONAs (as of 8 January 2023).)
17	Pretty Cure	1 Feb 2004	Ongoing	20-26 minutes	1,057	61	1,117 (Note: 1057 episodes, 34 films, 3 short films, and 12 episodes of both Power of Hope: PreCure Full Bloom and Witchy Pretty Cure!! Mirai Days (as of 10 November 2025).)
18	Naruto	3 Oct 2002	Ongoing	20-26 minutes	1,064	23	1,087 (Note: Including Rock Lee & His Ninja Pals and Boruto: Naruto Next Generations, there are 1,064 episodes, 11 films, and 12 OVAs (as of 26 March 2023).)
19	Duel Masters	21 Oct 2002	Ongoing	20-26 minutes	922	4	926 (Note: Including the American exclusive Sacred Lands, there are 922 episodes and 4 films (as of 26 March 2023).)
20	Dragon Ball	26 Feb 1986	Ongoing	20-26 minutes	811	79	890 (Note: 811 episodes, 22 films, 5 specials, 4 OVAs, and 48 ONAs (as of 13 April 2023).)
21	Beyblade	8 Jan 2001	Ongoing	20-26 minutes	720	158	878 (Note: TV episodes: Beyblade (season 1) has 51 episodes; Beyblade V-Force has 51 episodes; Beyblade G-Revolution has 52 episodes; Beyblade: Metal Fusion (season 1) has 51 episodes; Beyblade: Metal Masters has 51 episodes; Beyblade: Metal Fury has 52 episodes; Beyblade: Shogun Steel has 45 episodes; BeyWheelz has 13 episodes; BeyWarriors: BeyRaiderz has 13 episodes; BeyWarriors: Cyborg has 28 episodes; Beyblade Burst (season 1) has 51 episodes; Beyblade Burst Evolution has 51 episodes; Beyblade Burst Turbo has 51 episodes; Beyblade Burst QuadStrike has 26 episodes; Beyblade X has 134 episodes; ONAs: Beyblade Burst Rise has 52 episodes; Beyblade Burst Surge has 52 episodes; Beyblade Burst QuadDrive has 52 episodes; There are 2 films.)
22	Kotowaza House	4 Apr 1987	28 Sep 1994	5 minutes	773		773
23	Ninja Hattori-kun	28 Sep 1981	16 Feb 2015	10 minutes	746	5	751 (Note: There are 694 TV episodes in the 1981 series, 52 in the 2012 series, and 5 films (as of 28 July 2013).)
24	Obake no Q-tarō	29 Aug 1965	29 Mar 1987	15 minutes	741	3	744 (Note: There are 96 TV episodes in the 1965 series, 135 in the 1971 series, 510 in the 1985 series, and 3 films.)
25	Hanakappa	29 March 2010	Ongoing	10 minutes	699	1	700 (Note: 699 episodes and 1 movie.)
26	Manga Hajime Monogatari Series	6 May 1978	30 Mar 2001	20-26 minutes	657	2	659 (Note: 657 episodes and 2 specials.)
27	Cardfight!! Vanguard	8 Jan 2011	Ongoing	20-26 minutes	617	13	630 (Note: Including Bermuda Triangle: Colorful Pastrale and the Mini Vanguard shorts, there are 617 episodes, 1 film, and 12 ONAs (as of 1 April 2023).)
28	Instant History	1 May 1961	4 Jul 1964	5 minutes	624		624 (Note: There are 312 TV episodes in the 1961 series and 312 in the 1962 series.)
29	Perman	2 Apr 1967	6 Mar 2004	12 minutes	591	8	599 (Note: There are 65 TV episodes in the 1967 series, 526 in the 1983 series, 3 specials, and 5 films.)
30	Pretty Rhythm	2 Apr 2011	Ongoing	20-26 minutes	587	9	596 (Note: Including spin-offs, there are 587 episodes and 9 films (as of 9 October 2022).)
31	GeGeGe no Kitarō	3 Jan 1968	Ongoing	20-26 minutes	547	11	558 (Note: 547 episodes, 6 films, 4 short films, and 1 special (as of 29 March 2020).)
32	Time Bokan	4 Oct 1975	24 Mar 2018	20-26 minutes	550	3	553 (Note: 550 episodes, 1 film, and 2 OVAs.)
33	Digimon	6 Mar 1999	Ongoing	20-26 minutes	518	22	540 (Note: 518 episodes, 10 films, 11 short films, and 1 special (as of 26 March 2023).)
34	Gatchaman	1 Oct 1972	24 Feb 2018	20-26 minutes	476	5	481 (Note: Including Battle of the Planets, G-Force: Guardians of Space, and Eagle Riders, there are 476 episodes, 2 films, and 3 OVAs.)
35	Yo-kai Watch	8 Jan 2014	31 March 2023	20-26 minutes	460	8	468 (Note: 460 episodes and 8 films (as of 31 March 2023).)
36	Bakugan	5 Apr 2007	Ongoing	20-26 minutes	432	13	445 (Note: 432 episodes and 13 ONAs (as of 1 March 2023).)
37	Transformers	1 Apr 1986	1 Oct 2015	20-26 minutes	418	16	434 (Note: Focusing solely on anime media produced in Japan, there have been 418 episodes, 2 films, and 14 OVAs.)
38	Brave series	3 Feb 1990	27 Jun 2005	20-26 minutes	420	10	430 (Note: See Brave series overview)
39	Aikatsu!	8 Oct 2012	Ongoing	20-26 minutes	404	12	416 (Note: 404 episodes, 6 films, and 6 ONAs (as of 20 January 2023).)
40	Battle Spirits	7 Sep 2008	Ongoing	20-26 minutes	401	12	413 (Note: 401 episodes and 12 ONAs (as of 31 March 2022).)
41	Bleach	5 Oct 2004	Ongoing	20-26 minutes	406	4	410 (Note: 387 episodes and 4 films.)
42	Bonobono	13 Nov 1993	Ongoing	5 minutes	406	1	407 (Note: 406 episodes and 1 film (as of 13 May 2023).)
43	Hamtaro	15 Sep 1999	26 Mar 2008	20-26 minutes	394	9	403 (Note: 394 episodes, 4 films, and 5 OVAs.)
44	KochiKame: Tokyo Beat Cops	23 Nov 1985	18 Sep 2016	20-26 minutes	373	30	403 (Note: 373 episodes, 27 specials, and 3 films.)
45	Sgt. Frog	3 Apr 2004	6 Sep 2014	20-26 minutes	381	5	386 (Note: 381 episodes and 5 films.)
46	Gintama	4 Apr 2006	20 Jan 2021	20-26 minutes	367	11	378 (Note: 367 episodes, 3 films, 2 The Semi-Final special episodes, 4 Jump Festa special episodes and 2 Love Incense arc OVAs.)
47	Lupin the Third	24 Oct 1971	Ongoing	20-26 minutes	315	61	376 (Note: 315 episodes, 10 films, 29 specials, 15 OVAs, and 7 ONAs (as of 27 January 2023).)
48	B-Daman	7 Feb 1998	29 Sep 2013	20-26 minutes	375		375
49	Charady no Joke na Mainichi	1 Apr 2009	30 Mar 2010	3 minutes			365
50	The Idolmaster	3 Apr 2007	Ongoing	20-26 minutes	165	199	364 (Note: 165 episodes, 1 film, 11 OVAs, and 187 ONAs (as of 13 April 2021).)
51	Tetsujin 28-go	20 Oct 1963	26 Mar 2016	20-26 minutes	360	1	361 (Note: 360 episodes and 1 film.)
52	Jewelpet	5 Apr 2009	Ongoing	20-26 minutes	351	5	356 (Note: 351 episodes, 1 film, and 4 ONAs (as of 14 May 2022).)
53	Inazuma Eleven	5 Oct 2008	27 Sep 2019	20-26 minutes	343		343 (Note: There are 127 episodes in original series, 47 in Go saga, 51 in Go Chrono Stone saga, 43 in Go Galaxy saga, 26 in Ares no Tenbin saga and 49 in Orion no Kokuin saga)
54	Dr. Slump	8 Apr 1981	3 Mar 2007	20-26 minutes	317	24	341 (Note: There are 243 TV episodes in the 1981 series, 74 in the 1997 series, 10 films, 13 specials, and 1 OVA.)
55	Puzzle & Dragons	4 Jul 2016	Ongoing	20-26 minutes	341		341 (Note: 89 episodes in Puzzle & Dragons X and 252 episodes in its follow-up Puzzle & Dragons (as of 23 April 2023).)
56	Fairy Tail	12 Oct 2009	29 Sep 2019	20-26 minutes	328	11	339 (Note: There are 328 TV episodes, 9 OVAs, and 2 films.)
57	Captain Tsubasa	13 Oct 1983	Ongoing	20-26 minutes	318	18	336 (Note: 318 episodes, 5 films, and 13 OVAs (as of 30 June 2024).)
58	Atashin'chi	19 Apr 2002	19 Sep 2009	20-26 minutes	330	1	331 (Note: There are 330 TV episodes and 1 film.)
59	Kiteretsu Daihyakka	27 Mar 1988	9 Jun 1996	20-26 minutes	331		331
60	Astro Boy	1 Jan 1963	Ongoing	20-26 minutes	323	3	326 (Note: Including Atom: The Beginning and Pluto, there are 323 episodes, 1 film, and 2 short films (as of 26 October 2023).)
61	Saint Seiya	11 Oct 1986	Ongoing	20-26 minutes	211	109	320 (Note: 211 episodes, 5 films, 57 OVAs, and 47 ONAs (as of 9 October 2022).)
62	Bikkuriman	11 Oct 1987	Ongoing	20-26 minutes	317	2	319 (Note: 317 episodes and 2 films (as of 21 December 2023).)
63	Kinnikuman	3 Apr 1983	Ongoing	20-26 minutes	307	11	318 (Note: 307 episodes, 10 films, and 1 special (as of 22 September 2024).)
64	Captain Harlock	14 Mar 1978	7 Sep 2013	20-26 minutes	281	31	312 (Note: Including Cosmo Warrior Zero, Galaxy Express 999, and Queen Emeraldas media, there are 281 episodes, 5 films, 2 specials, and 24 OVAs.)
65	Folktales from Japan	1 Apr 2012	25 Mar 2018	20-26 minutes	308		308
66	Hyppo and Thomas	1 Jan 1971	30 Sep 1972	5 minutes			300
67	Ikkyū-san	15 Oct 1975	30 Apr 2014	20-26 minutes	296	4	300 (Note: 296 episodes, 3 films, and 1 special.)
68	Miracle! Mimika	3 Apr 2006	27 Mar 2009	10 minutes			300
69	Chi's Sweet Home	31 Mar 2008	19 July 2024	3 minutes	296	1	297 (Note: There are 104 in Chi's Sweet Home, 104 in Chi's Sweet Home: Chi's New Address, 76 in Chi's Sweet Adventure, 12 episodes of Chi's Sweet Summer Vacation, and 1 episode of Chi Meets Cocchi Archived 4 November 2020 at the Wayback Machine.)
70	Tamagotchi!	12 Oct 2009	29 Sep 2015	20-26 minutes	297		297 (Note: There are 143 TV episodes in first series, and 49 in second series, 29 in third series, and 50 in fourth series and 26 in the final series.)
71	Mazinger	3 Dec 1972	28 Oct 2017	20-26 minutes	271	21	292 (Note: 271 episodes, 10 films, and 11 OVAs.)
72	Mega Man	7 Jun 1993	29 Mar 2008	20-26 minutes	285	5	290 (Note: 285 episodes, 1 film, and 4 OVAs.)
73	Dotanba no Manners	3 Oct 1984	9 Apr 1987	5 minutes			283
74	Star of the Giants	30 Mar 1968	15 Jan 2003	20-26 minutes	257	18	275 (Note: 257 episodes, 5 films, and 13 OVAs.)
75	Zoids	4 Sep 1999	12 Mar 2021	20-26 minutes	269	6	275 (Note: 269 episodes and 6 ONAs.)
76	Fist of the North Star	11 Oct 1984	17 Dec 2018	20-26 minutes	264	9	273 (Note: Including spin-offs, there are 264 episodes, 4 films, and 5 OVAs.)
77	The Prince of Tennis	10 Oct 2001	Ongoing	20-26 minutes	204	69	273 (Note: 204 episodes, 4 films, 63 OVAs, and 2 ONAs (as of 29 September 2022).)
78	Future Card Buddyfight	4 Jan 2014	27 Apr 2019	20-26 minutes	272		272
79	Gan to Gon	5 Apr 1974	13 Aug 1975	5 minutes			260
80	Hoshi no Ko Poron	1 Apr 1974	21 Mar 1975	5 minutes			260
81	A Penguin's Troubles	5 Apr 2008	30 Mar 2013	10 minutes			254
82	Hello Kitty	22 Jul 1989	15 Jan 2020	9 minutes	105	148	253 (Note: 105 episodes, 3 films, 1 special, 141 OVAs, and 3 ONAs.)
83	Macross	3 Oct 1982	Ongoing	20-26 minutes	221	32	253 (Note: Including Robotech, there are 221 episodes, 9 films, and 23 OVAs (as of 8 October 2021).)
84	Ojamajo Doremi	7 Feb 1999	3 Dec 2021	20-26 minutes	214	39	253 (Note: There are 51 total TV episodes from the original 1999 series, 49 episodes in the 2000 (Sharp) series, 50 episodes in the 2001 (Motto!) series, 51 episodes in the 2002 (Dokkaan!) series, 13 total OVA (Naisho) episodes, 3 films, 5 OVA specials ((Sharp) Hana-chan, (Motto) Momo-chan Snack Cooking, Traffic Safety and Bicycle Safety, (Dokkaan!) Hana-chan), 26 Ojamajo Doremi: Owarai Gekijō ONA specials and 5 Ojamajo Doremi: Honobono Gekijō OVA specials.)
85	Osomatsu-kun	5 Feb 1966	Ongoing	20-26 minutes	221	26	247 (Note: 221 episodes, 4 films, 2 specials, 1 OVA, and 19 ONAs (as of 8 July 2022).)
86	Sailor Moon	7 Mar 1992	Ongoing	20-26 minutes	213	33	246 (Note: 213 episodes, 7 films, and 26 ONAs (as of 11 February 2021).)
87	Inuyasha	16 Oct 2000	Ongoing	20-26 minutes	241	4	245 (Note: Including Yashahime: Princess Half-Demon, there are 241 episodes and 4 films (as of 26 March 2022).)
88	Hunter × Hunter	26 Jul 1998	24 Sep 2014	20-26 minutes	210	33	243 (Note: Hunter x Hunter 62, Hunter x Hunter (2011) 148, Hunter x Hunter OVA 8, Hunter x Hunter: Greed Island 8, Hunter x Hunter: Greed Island Final 14, Hunter x Hunter Pilot 1, Hunter x Hunter: Phantom Rouge – Movie 1, Hunter x Hunter: The Last Mission – Movie 1.)
89	Itazura Tenshi Chippo-chan	30 Mar 1970	31 Dec 1970	5 minutes			240
90	Tenchi Muyo!	25 Sep 1992	Ongoing	20-26 minutes	190	50	240 (Note: Including the Magical Girl Pretty Sammy spin-offs, there are 190 episodes, 3 films, and 47 OVAs (as of 28 May 2021).)
91	Kaiketsu Zorori	28 Nov 1989	Ongoing	20-26 minutes	224	13	237 (Note: 224 episodes, 10 films, and 3 OVAs (as of 9 December 2022).)
92	Urusei Yatsura	14 Oct 1981	Ongoing	20-26 minutes	218	18	236 (Note: 218 episodes, 6 films, 1 special, and 11 OVAs (as of 24 March 2023).)
93	Fate	7 Jan 2006	Ongoing	20-26 minutes	189	42	231 (Note: 189 episodes, 10 films, 2 short films, 9 specials, 8 OVAs, and 13 ONAs (as of 2 July 2023).)
94	Megami Tensei	25 Mar 1987	26 Jun 2019	20-26 minutes	216	15	231 (Note: As listed under Megami Tensei media, there are 216 episodes, 5 films, 3 specials, and 7 OVAs.)
95	Space Battleship Yamato	6 Oct 1974	Ongoing	20-26 minutes	154	71	225 (Note: Including Star Blazers, there are 154 episodes, 10 films, 1 special, and 60 OVAs (as of 4 February 2022).)
96	Tensai Bakabon	25 Sep 1971	25 Sep 2018	20-26 minutes	225		225 (Note: Tensai Bakabon (40), Ganso Tensai Bakabon (103), Heisei Tensai Bakabon (46), Rerere no Tensai Bakabon (24), Shinya! Tensai Bakabon (12).)
97	Moomins	5 Oct 1969	8 Aug 1992	20-26 minutes	221	1	222 (Note: 221 episodes and 1 film.)
98	My Hero Academia	3 Apr 2016	Ongoing	20-26 minutes	196	23	219 (Note: 170 episodes, 2 OVAs, 4 ONAs, 6 TV specials, 4 movies, 5 movie specials, and 2 short films in My Hero Academia (TV series); 26 episodes in My Hero Academia: Vigilantes (as of 18th June, 2026).)
99	Hikarian	2 Apr 1997	31 Mar 2002	20-26 minutes	211		211 (Note: There are 211 episodes total in various series.)
100	Onegai My Melody	3 Apr 2005	11 Aug 2012	20-26 minutes	208	1	209 (Note: 208 episodes and 1 film.)
101	Yami Shibai	15 July 2013	Ongoing	4 minutes	208		208
102	Di Gi Charat	29 Nov 1999	Ongoing	12 minutes	184	24	208 (Note: 184 episodes, 1 film, 15 specials, and 8 OVAs (as of 3 January 2023).)
103	Major	13 Nov 2004	7 Nov 2020	20-26 minutes	204	4	208 (Note: 204 episodes, 1 film, and 3 OVAs.)
104	JoJo's Bizarre Adventure	19 Nov 1993	Ongoing	20-26 minutes	190	18	204 (Note: 190 episodes, 1 film, and 13 OVAs (as of 1 December 2022).)
105	Katekyō Hitman Reborn!	7 Oct 2006	25 Sep 2010	20-26 minutes	203	1	204 (Note: There are 203 total TV episodes and 1 OVA.)
106	Himitsu no Akko-chan	6 Jan 1969	28 Feb 1999	20-26 minutes	199	2	201 (Note: 199 episodes and 2 films.)
107	Sally the Witch	5 Dec 1966	1 Feb 1995	20-26 minutes	197	4	201 (Note: 197 episodes, 1 film, 2 specials, and 1 OVA.)
108	The Kindaichi Case Files	7 Apr 1997	26 Mar 2016	20-26 minutes	200		200
109	Holly the Ghost	28 Jan 1991	12 Apr 1993	10 minutes			200
110	Parasol Henbee	2 Oct 1989	12 Jan 1991	10 minutes			200

== See also ==
- Category:Lists of anime episodes
- List of manga series by volume count
- List of television programs by episode count
