= List of Ojamajo Doremi episodes =

The first series of Ojamajo Doremi was originally aired on TV Asahi from February 7, 1999, to January 30, 2000, and ran 51 episodes. It replaced the time slot for Yume no Crayon Oukoku and a new episode aired weekly. The series focuses on a young girl named Doremi Harukaze, who becomes a witch apprentice (witchling in the 4Kids dub). She is joined by her friends Hazuki Fujiwara and Aiko Senoo to complete nine witch exams in order to accomplish their goal.

A direct sequel, Ojamajo Doremi #, was created near the end of the show's run and aired right after Ojamajo Doremi's conclusion. It ran from February 6, 2000, to January 28, 2001, with 49 episodes. The same year, during summer, a short 30 minute film titled Ojamajo Doremi # The Movie was released along with Digimon Hurricane Touchdown!! / Supreme Evolution!! The Golden Digimentals for the 2000 Summer Toei Anime Fair. The Digimon movie was split into two parts and Ojamajo Doremi # The Movie was released between the two parts.

After Ojamajo Doremi # ended in 2001, another direct sequel, titled Mōtto! Ojamajo Doremi aired from February 4, 2001, to January 27, 2002, with 50 episodes. In the summer, another short 30 minute film was released in theaters, titled Kaeru Seki no Himitsu. It was released between Digimon Tamers: Battle of Adventurers and Kinnikuman.

Following Mōtto! Ojamajo Doremi, the fourth and final series, Ojamajo Doremi Dokkān!, aired on TV Asahi from February 3, 2002, to January 26, 2003, and ran 51 episodes.

Ojamajo Doremi took a brief hiatus to early 2004, when Toei Animation announced news of making Ojamajo Doremi Na-i-sho. It, a 13-episode sidestory to Mōtto! Ojamajo Doremi, was originally scheduled to be released as an OVA beginning September 24, 2004, but was made available on Sky PerfectTV!! PPV from June 26, 2004, to December 11, 2004.

In the United States, Ojamajo Doremi was aired on 4Kids TV under the name Magical DoReMi beginning with a preview episode on August 13, 2005, The series was regularly aired beginning September 10, 2005; 26 episodes by March 11, 2006. The show was then in reruns until August 19, 2006. The show resumed its run on November 13, 2007, exclusively on the network's web site and released its finale episode on May 2, 2008. Episode 30 was never dubbed in English.

Reruns of the English dub aired on The CW4Kids Saturday morning block from April 24 to July 17, 2010

The English dub streaming on Toei Animation's YouTube channel as part of the "Summer Weekend Splash" live event from June 28 to September 21, 2025

== Series overview ==
Season	Title	Episodes	Originally released		Direction
Season	Title	Episodes	First released	Last released	Direction
1	Ojamajo Doremi	51	February 7, 1999	January 30, 2000	Junichi Sato; Takuya Igarashi
2	Ojamajo Doremi Sharp	49	February 6, 2000	January 28, 2001	Shigeyasu Yamauchi; Takuya Igarashi
3	Mōtto! Ojamajo Doremi	50	February 4, 2001	January 27, 2002	Takuya Igarashi
4	Ojamajo Doremi Dokkān!	51	February 3, 2002	January 26, 2003	Takuya Igarashi

== Episodes ==
=== Series 1: Ojamajo Doremi ===
No.	Japanese translated title/English title	Original release date	English air date
1	"I'm Doremi! I'm a Witch Apprentice" ("Now I Am a Witchling"); Transliteration: "Watashi Doremi! Majo Minarai ni Naru" (Japanese: 私どれみ! 魔女見習いになる)	February 7, 1999	September 10, 2005
2	"I, Become Hazuki-chan!" ("Being Dorie, Being Reanne"); Transliteration: "Watashi, Hazuki-chan ni Naru!" (Japanese: 私、はづきちゃんになる!)	February 14, 1999	September 17, 2005
3	"The Transfer Student from Naniwa! Aiko Debuts" ("The Spit Curl Girl"); Transliteration: "Tenkōsei wa Naniwa-ko! Aiko Tōjō" (Japanese: 転校生はナニワっこ! あいこ登場)	February 21, 1999	September 24, 2005
4	"It's Not Scary If We're All Witches" ("Dustin' the Old Rusty Broom"); Transliteration: "Minna Majo Nara Kowakunai" (Japanese: みんな魔女なら怖くない)	February 28, 1999	August 13, 2005
5	"Grand Opening! House Of Magic" ("Witch Conya of the Lunaverse"); Transliteration: "Shinsō Kaiten! Mahōdō" (Japanese: 新装開店! MAHO堂)	March 7, 1999	October 8, 2005
6	"A Liar's First Friendship" ("Believing Belinda"); Transliteration: "Usotsuki wa Yūjō no Hajimari" (Japanese: ウソつきは友情の始まり)	March 14, 1999	October 15, 2005
7	"Aim For Level 9! Witch Exam" ("Caitlyn's Day Out"); Transliteration: "Mezase Kyu-kyū! Majo Shiken" (Japanese: めざせ9級! 魔女試験)	March 21, 1999	October 22, 2005
8	"Go to the Witch World!!" ("Finally a Fairy!"); Transliteration: "Majo no Sekai he Go!!" (Japanese: 魔女の世界へGO!!)	March 28, 1999	October 29, 2005
9	"Where Did You Go!? Fairy Dodo" ("A Runaway Fairy"); Transliteration: "Doko Ittano!? Yōsei Dodo" (Japanese: どこ行ったの!? 妖精ドド)	April 4, 1999	November 5, 2005
10	"Pinch! The Teacher Found Out!!" ("Trouble in Store"); Transliteration: "Pinchi! Sensei ni Barechatta!!" (Japanese: ピンチ! 先生にバレちゃった!!)	April 11, 1999	November 12, 2005
11	"Early Riser Girl Marina and a Bouquet from the Heart" ("You Don't Bring Me Flowers"); Transliteration: "Hayaoki Shōjo Marina to Kokoro no Hanataba" (Japanese: 早起き少女まりなと心の花たば)	April 11, 1999	November 19, 2005
12	"A Wish For A Precious Shirt" ("He Ain't Pelé, He's My Brother"); Transliteration: "Taisetsu na Shatsu no Negaigoto" (Japanese: 大切なシャツの願い事)	April 25, 1999	November 26, 2005
13	"Everyone Fails!? The Level 8 Exam" ("Parsley and Rosemary"); Transliteration: "Minna Fugōkaku!? Yattsu-kyū Shiken" (Japanese: みんな不合格!? 8級試験)	May 2, 1999	December 3, 2005
14	"Laugh and Forgive Me!?" ("A Tall Order"); Transliteration: "Waratte Yurushite!?" (Japanese: 笑って許して!?)	May 9, 1999	December 10, 2005
15	"Majorika Goes to Kindergarten" ("Patina Goes to Kindergarten"); Transliteration: "Majorika Yōchien ni Iku" (Japanese: マジョリカ幼稚園に行く)	May 16, 1999	February 4, 2006
16	"Fishing for Love" ("Gone Fishin'"); Transliteration: "Koi wo Tsuriageyou" (Japanese: 恋を釣り上げよう)	May 23, 1999	February 4, 2006
17	"Yada is a Delinquent!?" ("Sketches of Pain"); Transliteration: "Yada-kun wa Furyō Shōgakusei?" (Japanese: 矢田くんは不良小学生!?)	May 30, 1999	February 11, 2006
18	"Don't Use That! The Forbidden Magic" ("The Flora Test"); Transliteration: "Tsukuccha Dame! Kinjirareta Mahō" (Japanese: 使っちゃダメ! 禁じられた魔法)	June 6, 1999	February 11, 2006
19	"Hazuki is Kidnapped!" ("Uncle Mick and his Sidekick"); Transliteration: "Hazuki-chan Yūkai Sareru!" (Japanese: はづきちゃん誘拐される!)	June 13, 1999	February 18, 2006
20	"The Rival Makes Her Appearance! The House of Magic is in a Pinch!!" ("Get on the Bus"); Transliteration: "Raibaru Tōjō! Mahōdō Dai Pīnchi!!" (Japanese: ライバル登場! MAHO堂大ピ〜ンチ!!)	June 20, 1999	February 18, 2006
21	"Majo Ruka's Goods are Filled with Danger" ("The Mystery Wind"); Transliteration: "Majoruka Guzzu wa Kiken ga Ippai" (Japanese: マジョルカグッズは危険がいっぱい)	June 27, 1999	February 25, 2006
22	"The Road to the Level 6 Witch is Long!?" ("We Need a Wandawhirl"); Transliteration: "Roku-kyū Majo he no Michi wa Tōi!?" (Japanese: 6級魔女への道は遠い!?)	July 4, 1999	February 25, 2006
23	"Big Turnaround!? Ojamajo's Training" ("Mirabelle's Blues"); Transliteration: "Daigyakuten!? Ojamajo no Shiren" (Japanese: 大逆転!? おジャ魔女の試練)	July 11, 1999	March 4, 2006
24	"Majoruka Versus Level 6 Ojamajos!" ("Down in the Dumps"); Transliteration: "Majoruka Tai Roku-kyū Ojamajo!" (Japanese: マジョルカ対6級おジャ魔女!)	July 18, 1999	March 4, 2006
25	"Ojamajo Pop Appears!" ("The New Witch on the Block"); Transliteration: "Ojamajo Poppu Tōjō!?" (Japanese: おジャ魔女ぽっぷ登場!?)	July 25, 1999	March 11, 2006
26	"We are the, Pureleine!" ("That Darn Evil Cat"); Transliteration: "Watashi-tachi, Pyuarēnu!" (Japanese: わたしたち、ピュアレーヌ!)	August 1, 1999	March 11, 2006
27	"Oyajide Arrives!?" ("You Ought Not to Be in Pictures"); Transliteration: "Oyajīde ga Yattekita!?" (Japanese: オヤジーデがやってきた!?)	August 8, 1999	November 20, 2007
28	"Love is a Windy Ride Over a Plateau" ("Love Serving Love"); Transliteration: "Koi wa Kōgen no Kaze ni Notte" (Japanese: 恋は高原の風に乗って)	August 15, 1999	November 27, 2007
29	"The Tap Disappeared at the Festival!" ("To Catch A Thief"); Transliteration: "Natsu Matsuri ni Tappu ga Kieta!" (Japanese: 夏祭りにタップが消えた!)	August 22, 1999	November 13, 2007
30	"I Want to Meet the Ghost!"; Transliteration: "Yūrei ni Aitai!" (Japanese: ユウレイに会いたい!)	August 29, 1999	Unaired
31	"Presents from Mongolia" ("Careful What You Witch For"); Transliteration: "Monguru Kara no Okurimono" (Japanese: モンゴルからのおくりもの)	September 5, 1999	December 4, 2007
32	"Defeat Tamaki! The Class President Election" ("Scooter For President"); Transliteration: "Datō Tamaki! Gakkyūīn Senkyō" (Japanese: 打倒玉木! 学級委員選挙)	September 12, 1999	December 11, 2007
33	"Panic at the Sports Festival" ("Born to Run"); Transliteration: "Undōkai wa Panikku ga Ippai!" (Japanese: 運動会はパニックがいっぱい!)	September 19, 1999	December 18, 2007
34	"I Want to See My Mother!" ("Mo' Mirabelle's Blues"); Transliteration: "Okā-chan ni Aitai!" (Japanese: お母ちゃんに逢いたい!)	September 26, 1999	December 21, 2007
35	"The Transfer Student is a Witch Apprentice!?" ("The Lyin' Witch and her Wardrobe"); Transliteration: "Tenkōsei wa Majo Minarai!?" (Japanese: 転校生は魔女見習い!?)	October 3, 1999	January 2, 2008
36	"The Level 4 Exam is Do-do-do-do-do!" ("Obstacle Schmob-stacle"); Transliteration: "Yon-kyū Shiken wa Do-do-do-do-dō!" (Japanese: 四級試験はドドドドドー!)	October 10, 1999	January 8, 2008
37	"So Many Magical Frogs!" ("The Lost Greenlings"); Transliteration: "Majo Gaeru ga Ippai!" (Japanese: 魔女ガエルがいっぱい!)	October 17, 1999	January 15, 2008
38	"Ryota and the Monster of the Night" ("Of Monsters and Witchlings"); Transliteration: "Ryōta to Mayonaka no Kaijū" (Japanese: りょうたと真夜中のかいじゅう)	October 24, 1999	January 22, 2008
39	"Doremi's Boyfriend is a Middle School Student!" ("Skater Love"); Transliteration: "Doremi no Kare wa Chūgakusei!" (Japanese: どれみの彼は中学生!)	October 31, 1999	May 2, 2008
40	"Doremi Wins Easily? The Level 3 Exam" ("The 3-Door Test"); Transliteration: "Doremi Rakushō? San-kyū Shiken" (Japanese: どれみ楽勝? 3級試験)	November 14, 1999	February 5, 2008
41	"Father and Son: The Move Towards Victory!" ("There's no Business like Shogi Business"); Transliteration: "Chichi to Ko: Shōri no Itte!" (Japanese: 父と子·勝利への一手!)	November 21, 1999	February 12, 2008
42	"The Ojamajo's Fight for Justice!?" ("Morph than a Feeling"); Transliteration: "Ojamajo Seigi no Tatakai!?" (Japanese: おジャ魔女·正義の戦い!?)	November 28, 1999	February 19, 2008
43	"Tearful Memories of Papa and the Fireworks" ("Parental Guidance"); Transliteration: "Papa to Hanabi to Namida no Omoide" (Japanese: パパと花火と涙の思い出)	December 5, 1999	February 26, 2008
44	"I Want to Be a Female Pro Wrestler!" ("Candi is Dandy"); Transliteration: "Joshi Puro Resurā ni Naritai!" (Japanese: 女子プロレスラーになりたい!)	December 12, 1999	March 4, 2008
45	"Help Santa!" ("Saving Santa"); Transliteration: "Santa-san wo Sukue!" (Japanese: サンタさんを救え!)	December 19, 1999	March 11, 2008
46	"The Witches' Talent Show" ("Just Like Magic"); Transliteration: "Majo no Kakushi Geidaikai!" (Japanese: 魔女のかくし芸大会!)	December 26, 1999	March 18, 2008
47	"Father's Arranged Marriage Meeting" ("The Date Crasher"); Transliteration: "Otō-chan no Omiai" (Japanese: お父ちゃんのお見合い)	January 2, 2000	March 25, 2008
48	"Onpu's E-Mail was a Love Letter?" ("Geek Love"); Transliteration: "Onpu no Mēru wa Rabu Retā?" (Japanese: おんぷのメールはラブレター?)	January 9, 2000	April 1, 2008
49	"I Want to Meet Papa! The Dream Placed on the Overnight Express" ("Train a Comin'"); Transliteration: "Papa ni Aeru! Yume wo Noseta Shindai Tokkyū" (Japanese: パパに会える! 夢を乗せた寝台特急)	January 16, 2000	April 8, 2008
50	"The Last Witch Apprentice Exam" ("The Final Test"); Transliteration: "Saigo no Minarai Majo Shiken" (Japanese: 最後の見習い魔女試験)	January 23, 2000	April 15, 2008
51	"Farewell Mahodo" ("The Hardest Test of All"); Transliteration: "Sayōnara Mahōdō" (Japanese: さようならMAHO堂)	January 30, 2000	April 22, 2008

=== Series 2: Ojamajo Doremi Sharp (Ojamajo Doremi #) ===
No. overall	No. in season	Title	Original release date
52	1	"Doremi Becomes a Mom!?"; Transliteration: "Doremi Mama ni Naru!?" (Japanese: どれみママになる!?)	February 6, 2000
53	2	"Raising a Baby is a Lot of Trouble!"; Transliteration: "Akachan Sodate wa mō Taihen!" (Japanese: 赤ちゃん育ては、もうたいへん!)	February 13, 2000
54	3	"Don't Fall Asleep! Pop's Witch Apprentice Exam"; Transliteration: "Nemuccha Dame! Poppu no Minarai Shiken" (Japanese: 眠っちゃダメ!ぽっぷの見習い試験)	February 20, 2000
55	4	"Doremi Fails as a Mom!?"; Transliteration: "Doremi wa Mama Shikkaku!?" (Japanese: どれみはママ失格!?)	February 27, 2000
56	5	"So Long, Oyajide"; Transliteration: "Sayonara Oyajīde" (Japanese: さよならオヤジーデ)	March 5, 2000
57	6	"Stubbornness and the Daisy in Flower Language"; Transliteration: "Ijippari to Deijī no Hanakotoba" (Japanese: 意地っぱりとデイジーの花ことば)	March 12, 2000
58	7	"Hana's Health Examination"; Transliteration: "Hana-chan no Kenkōshinda" (Japanese: ハナちゃんの健康診断)	March 19, 2000
59	8	"Through Time, in Search of Onpu's Mother's Secret!"; Transliteration: "Jikan wo Koete, Onpu Mama no Himitsu wo Sagase!" (Japanese: 時間を超えて、おんぷママの秘密を探せ!)	March 26, 2000
60	9	"Search for the Herb! The House of Magic's Bus Trip"; Transliteration: "Hābu wo Sagase! Mahodō Basu no Tabi" (Japanese: ハーブを探せ!MAHO堂バスの旅)	April 2, 2000
61	10	"High School Student Aiko is "The Running Girl"!?"; Transliteration: "Kōkōsei Aiko wa "Hashiru Shōjo"!?" (Japanese: 高校生あいこは「走る少女」!?)	April 9, 2000
62	11	"Hazuki Learns How to Dance!?"; Transliteration: "Hazuki-chan Odori wo Narau!?" (Japanese: はづきちゃん踊りを習う!?)	April 16, 2000
63	12	"The Health Examination's Yellow Cards!"; Transliteration: "Kenkōshinda de Ierō Kādo!" (Japanese: 健康診断でイエローカード!)	April 23, 2000
64	13	"Doremi, Becomes a Bride?"; Transliteration: "Doremi, Oyome-san ni Naru?" (Japanese: どれみ、お嫁さんになる?)	April 30, 2000
65	14	"Pop's First Love? The Admiration of Mr. Junichi!"; Transliteration: "Poppu no Hatsukoi? Akogare no Junichi-sensei!" (Japanese: ぽっぷの初恋?あこがれの順一先生!)	May 7, 2000
66	15	"Mother's Day and Mother's Portrait"; Transliteration: "Haha no Hi to Okāsan no Nigaoe" (Japanese: 母の日とお母さんのにがお絵)	May 14, 2000
67	16	"First Time Crawling!? Big Panic at the Harukaze Residence!"; Transliteration: "Hajimete no Haihai!? Harukaze-ke, Dai Panikku!" (Japanese: はじめてのハイハイ!? 春風家、大パニック!)	May 21, 2000
68	17	"Hana's Crawling Exam"; Transliteration: "Hana-chan no Haihai Kenshin" (Japanese: ハナちゃんのハイハイ健診)	May 24, 2000
69	18	"Dodo Runs Away!"; Transliteration: "Dodo ga Ie de Shichatta!" (Japanese: ドドが家出しちゃった!)	June 4, 2000
70	19	"Doremi and Hazuki's Big Fight"; Transliteration: "Doremi to Hazuki no Ōgenka" (Japanese: どれみとはづきの大げんか)	June 11, 2000
71	20	"I Can Meet Mom! Aiko's Tearful Reunion"; Transliteration: "Okāchan ni Aeru! Aiko Namida no Saikai" (Japanese: お母ちゃんに会える! あいこ涙の再会)	June 25, 2000
72	21	"Misanthropist Majodon and the Promise of the Herb"; Transliteration: "Ningen-girai no Majodon to Yakusoku no Hābu" (Japanese: 人間嫌いのマジョドンとやくそくのハーブ)	July 2, 2000
73	22	"The Wizard's Trap: Oyajide Returns"; Transliteration: "Mahōtsukai no Wana: Kaettekita Oyajīde" (Japanese: 魔法使いのワナ 帰ってきたオヤジーデ!)	July 9, 2000
74	23	"Using New Powers to Rescue Hana!"; Transliteration: "Aratana Ryoku de Hana-chan o Torimodose!" (Japanese: 新たな力でハナちゃんをとりもどせ!)	July 17, 2000
75	24	"Fried Bread Power is Scary!"; Transliteration: "Agepan Pawā Osorubeshi!" (Japanese: あげパンパワーおそるべし!)	July 24, 2000
76	25	"The Mysterious Pretty Boy: Akatsuki-kun Appears!"; Transliteration: "Nazo no Bishōnen: Akatsuki-kun Tōjō!" (Japanese: 謎の美少年·暁くん登場!)	July 30, 2000
77	26	"Kanae's Diet Plan"; Transliteration: "Kanae-chan no Daietto Sakusen" (Japanese: かなえちゃんのダイエット作戦)	August 6, 2000
78	27	"The Northern Country Herb and the Important Memory"; Transliteration: "Kitaguni no Hābu to Taisetsu na Omoide" (Japanese: 北国のハーブと大切な思い出)	August 13, 2000
79	28	"The Targeted Physical Examination"; Transliteration: "Nerawareta Kenkōshindan" (Japanese: ねらわれた健康診断)	August 20, 2000
80	29	"Everyone Disappears During the Test of Courage!?"; Transliteration: "Kimodameshi de Minna ga Kieta!?" (Japanese: きもだめしでみんなが消えた!?)	August 27, 2000
81	30	"Miss Seki's Got A Boyfriend!?"; Transliteration: "Seki-sensei ni Koibito ga Dekita!?" (Japanese: 関先生に恋人ができた!?)	September 3, 2000
82	31	"FLAT4 Arrives From The Wizard World!"; Transliteration: "Mahōtsukai no Kuni kara FLAT4 Sanjou!" (Japanese: 魔法使いの国からFLAT4参上!)	September 10, 2000
83	32	"Fly Away! Dodo and the Others' Big Transformation"; Transliteration: "Tondekepyū! Dodo-tachi no Dai Henshin" (Japanese: とんでけピュー!ドドたちの大変身)	September 17, 2000
84	33	"Say Cheese on the Class Trip!"; Transliteration: "Ensoku wa Minna de Hai Chīzu!" (Japanese: 遠足はみんなでハイチーズ!)	October 1, 2000
85	34	"Takoyaki is the Taste of Making Up"; Transliteration: "Takoyaki wa Nakanaori no Aji" (Japanese: たこ焼きは仲なおりの味)	October 8, 2000
86	35	"Aim for the Top in the Sports Festival!"; Transliteration: "Undōkai de Teppen wo Mezase!" (Japanese: 運動会でてっぺんをめざせ!)	October 15, 2000
87	36	"Aiko's Rival! Sports Showdown!"; Transliteration: "Aiko ga Raibaru! Supōtsu Shōbu!!" (Japanese: あいこがライバル!スポーツ勝負!!)	October 22, 2000
88	37	"Hana and Pop Both Take Exams!"; Transliteration: "Hana-chan mo Poppu mo Shiken Jyuu!" (Japanese: ハナちゃんもぽっぷも試験中!)	October 29, 2000
89	38	"Hazuki is a Great Director!"; Transliteration: "Hazuki-chan wa Meikantoku!" (Japanese: はづきちゃんは名監督!)	November 12, 2000
90	39	"A Selfish Child and The Angry Monster"; Transliteration: "Waga Mamakko to Okotta Kaishū" (Japanese: わがままっ子と怒ったかいじゅう)	November 19, 2000
91	40	"The Piano Comes to the Harukaze House!"; Transliteration: "Harukaze-ke ni Piano ga Yattekuru!" (Japanese: 春風家にピアノがやってくる!)	November 26, 2000
92	41	"Onpu is Overtaken! The Road to Becoming an Idol!"; Transliteration: "Onpu ni Oitsuke! Aidoru e no Michi!" (Japanese: おんぷに追いつけ!アイドルへの道!)	December 3, 2000
93	42	"The Witch Who Does Not Cast Magic"; Transliteration: "Mahō wo Tsukawanai Majo" (Japanese: 魔法をつかわない魔女)	December 10, 2000
94	43	"Hana is Our Classmate!?"; Transliteration: "Hana-chan wa Kurasumeito!?" (Japanese: ハナちゃんはクラスメイト!?)	December 17, 2000
95	44	"White Christmas of Happiness"; Transliteration: "Shiawase no Howaito Kurisumasu" (Japanese: 幸せのホワイト·クリスマス)	December 24, 2000
96	45	"Ojamajo Era Drama: The Girl Harboring Ambition!"; Transliteration: "Ojamajo Jidaigeki: Shōjo yo Taishi wo Idake!" (Japanese: おジャ魔女時代劇·少女よ大志をいだけ!)	December 31, 2000
97	46	"The Final Physical Examination: Hana's Mom Will Protect Her!"; Transliteration: "Saigo no Kenkōshindan: Hana-chan wa Mama ga Mamoru!" (Japanese: 最後の健診·ハナちゃんはママが守る!)	January 7, 2001
98	47	"Give Back Hana! The Great Magic Battle"; Transliteration: "Hana-chan wo Kaeshite! Mahō Dai Kessen" (Japanese: ハナちゃんを返して!魔法大決戦)	January 14, 2001
99	48	"Hana's Dying!?"; Transliteration: "Hana-chan ga Shinjau!?" (Japanese: ハナちゃんが死んじゃう!?)	January 21, 2001
100	49	"Good Bye, Hana"; Transliteration: "Sayonara Hana-chan" (Japanese: さよならハナちゃん)	January 28, 2001

=== Series 3: Mo~tto! Ojamajo Doremi ===
==== Main episodes ====
No. overall	No. in season	Title	Original release date
101	1	"Doremi's Stormy New School Year"; Transliteration: "Doremi, Arashi no Shingakki!" (Japanese: どれみ、嵐の新学期!)	February 4, 2001
102	2	"Momoko Cries!? Secret of the Earring"; Transliteration: "Momoko ga Naita!? Pierce no Himitsu" (Japanese: ももこが泣いた!?ピアスの秘密)	February 11, 2001
103	3	"I Hate You! But I Would Like to Become Friends"; Transliteration: "Dai Kirai! Demo Tomodachi ni Naritai!" (Japanese: 大キライ!でも友だちになりたい!)	February 18, 2001
104	4	"Welcome to the Sweet House!"; Transliteration: "Youkoso, Sweet House He!" (Japanese: ようこそ、スウィートハウスへ!)	February 25, 2001
105	5	"The SOS Trio Break Up!?"; Transliteration: "SOS Trio ga Kaisan!?" (Japanese: SOSトリオが解散!?)	March 4, 2001
106	6	"Challenge! The First Patissier Exam"; Transliteration: "Chousen! Hajimete no Patissier Shiken" (Japanese: 挑戦!初めてのパティシエ服)	March 11, 2001
107	7	"Welcome Home! Hana"; Transliteration: "Okaeri! Hana-chan" (Japanese: おかえり!ハナちゃん)	March 18, 2001
108	8	"What Is A Close Friend?"; Transliteration: "Shinyu-tte, Nani?" (Japanese: 親友って、なーに?)	March 25, 2001
109	9	"Hazuki and Masaru's Treasure"; Transliteration: "Hazuki to Masaru no Takaramono" (Japanese: はづきとまさるのたからもの)	April 1, 2001
110	10	"We Don't Want to Become Adults!"; Transliteration: "Otona ni Nante Naritakunai!" (Japanese: おとなになんてなりたくない!)	April 8, 2001
111	11	"The Teacher Doesn't Stop!!"; Transliteration: "Sensei ga Tomaranai!" (Japanese: 先生が止まらない!!)	April 15, 2001
112	12	"Kotake vs. Demon Coach Igarashi"; Transliteration: "Kotake VS Oni Coach Igarashi" (Japanese: 小竹VS鬼コーチ五十嵐)	April 22, 2001
113	13	"The Dream Boat That You Want!"; Transliteration: "Yume no Fune ni Noritai!" (Japanese: 夢の船にのりたい!)	April 29, 2001
114	14	"A Messed Up Happy Birthday"; Transliteration: "Harann no Happy Birthday" (Japanese: 波乱のハッピーバースデー)	May 6, 2001
115	15	"Do You Love Pretty Mothers Or Not?"; Transliteration: "Kirei na Okaasan wa Suki? Kirai?" (Japanese: きれいなお母さんはスキ?キライ?)	May 13, 2001
116	16	"Isn't It Enough to be Tasty!?"; Transliteration: "Oishii Dakeja, Dame!?" (Japanese: おいしいだけじゃ、ダメ!?)	May 20, 2001
117	17	"Fatal Rivals! Harukaze and Tamaki"; Transliteration: "Innen no Rival! Harukaze to Tamaki" (Japanese: 因縁のライバル!!春風と玉木)	May 27, 2001
118	18	"Glued To!! A Child Idol's Day"; Transliteration: "Micchaku! Chaidoru no Ichinichi" (Japanese: 密着!!チャイドルの一日)	June 3, 2001
119	19	"Similar Parent and Child, Always Quarreling"; Transliteration: "Kenka Bakkari Nitamono Oyako" (Japanese: ケンカばっかり似たもの親子)	June 10, 2001
120	20	"The Classmate I Met For the First Time"; Transliteration: "Hajimete Au Classmate" (Japanese: はじめて会うクラスメイト)	June 24, 2001
121	21	"Out Of Magic Powder!!"; Transliteration: "Mahou no Moto ga Naku Nachau!!" (Japanese: まほうのもとがなくなっちゃう!!)	July 1, 2001
122	22	"Pop is a Big Sister??"; Transliteration: "Poppu ga Oneechan??" (Japanese: ぽっぷがお姉ちゃん??)	July 8, 2001
123	23	"Clam of the Shore"; Transliteration: "Nagisa no Hamaguri" (Japanese: なぎさのハマグリ)	July 15, 2001
124	24	"Rock 'N' Roll in the Music Club!?"; Transliteration: "Ongaku Club de Rock 'N' Roll!?" (Japanese: 音楽クラブでロックンロール!?)	July 22, 2001
125	25	"A Lonely Summer Vacation"; Transliteration: "Hitoribocchi no Natsuyasumi" (Japanese: ひとりぼっちの夏休み)	July 29, 2001
126	26	"Let Fly Your Feelings! Aiko, to Osaka!"; Transliteration: "Omoi yo Todoke! Aiko Osaka-e" (Japanese: 想いよとどけ!あいこ大阪へ)	August 5, 2001
127	27	"Going Through a Nasty Exam!"; Transliteration: "Ijiwaru shiken wo Kiri Nukero!" (Japanese: いじわる試験を切りぬけろ!)	August 12, 2001
128	28	"Witch Kindergarten, In the Nick of Time!"; Transliteration: "Majo Youchien, Kikiippatsu!" (Japanese: 魔女幼稚園、危機いっぱつ!)	August 19, 2001
129	29	"Terror! The Curse of the Water Well Ghost"; Transliteration: "Kyoufu! Ido Yuurei no Noroi" (Japanese: 恐怖!井戸ユウレイの呪い)	August 26, 2001
130	30	"Please Give Us the Illusionary Recipe!"; Transliteration: "Maboroshi no Recipe wo Kudasai!" (Japanese: まぼろしのレシピをください!)	September 2, 2001
131	31	"I'll Fix It! Vegetable Distaste"; Transliteration: "Naoshite Misemasu! Yasai Girai" (Japanese: なおしてみせます!野菜ギライ)	September 9, 2001
132	32	"Momoko's Mother Training"; Transliteration: "Momoko no Mama Shugyou" (Japanese: ももこのママ修行)	September 16, 2001
133	33	"Unrivaled!? Ojamajo's Assistance In Battle"; Transliteration: "Tenka Muteki!? Ojamajo na Sukedachi" (Japanese: 天下無敵!?おジャ魔女な助太刀)	September 23, 2001
134	34	"Revive! The Legendary Sweet"; Transliteration: "Yomigaere! Densetsu no Okashi" (Japanese: よみがえれ!伝説のお菓子)	September 30, 2001
135	35	"Tamaki, Taking On The Rule!?"; Transliteration: "Tamaki, Tenka-o Toru!?" (Japanese: 玉木、天下をとる!?)	October 7, 2001
136	36	"Hazuki's Delicious Idea"; Transliteration: "Hazuki no Oishii Idea" (Japanese: はづきのおいしいアイデア)	October 14, 2001
137	37	"Fairies Want To Rest Too!!"; Transliteration: "Yousei Datte Yasumitai!!" (Japanese: 妖精だって休みたい!!)	October 21, 2001
138	38	"I Want To Go To School!"; Transliteration: "Gakkou ni Ikitai!" (Japanese: 学校に行きたい!)	October 28, 2001
139	39	"School Arts Festival! Who's the Lead Part?"; Transliteration: "Gakugeikai! Shuyaku wa Daare?" (Japanese: 学芸会!主役はだーれ?)	November 11, 2001
140	40	"Hana, Digging for Potatoes!"; Transliteration: "Hana-chan, Imo wo Horu!" (Japanese: ハナちゃん、イモを掘る!)	November 18, 2001
141	41	"Revitalization of the Witch-Frogs' Village"; Transliteration: "Majo-gaeru no Mura Okoshi" (Japanese: 魔女ガエルの村おこし)	November 25, 2001
142	42	"Heart-Pounding! The Twins' Mysterious Magic"; Transliteration: "Dokidoki! Futago no Fushigi na Mahou" (Japanese: ドキドキ!ふたごの不思議なまほう)	December 2, 2001
143	43	"The Ojamajo Cross the Sea"; Transliteration: "Ojamajo wa Umi wo Koete" (Japanese: おジャ魔女は海を越えて)	December 9, 2001
144	44	"Ai-chan Goes Home!?"; Transliteration: "Ai-chan ga Kaecchau!?" (Japanese: あいちゃんが帰っちゃう!?)	December 16, 2001
145	45	"Merry Christmas, Everyone!"; Transliteration: "Minna de! Merry Christmas" (Japanese: みんなで!メリークリスマス)	December 23, 2001
146	46	"The Nonsensical Magical New Year's Party"; Transliteration: "Hachamecha Mahou Bounenkai" (Japanese: ハチャメチャ魔法忘年会)	December 30, 2001
147	47	"Hana's Great Adventure"; Transliteration: "Hana-chan no Dai Bouken" (Japanese: ハナちゃんの大冒険)	January 6, 2002
148	48	"Zero Clues! The Final Exam"; Transliteration: "Tegakari Zero! Saigo no Shiken" (Japanese: 手がかりゼロ!最後の試験)	January 13, 2002
149	49	"Open Your Eyes! Manipulated Momoko"; Transliteration: "Me wo Samashite! Ayatsurareta Momoko" (Japanese: 目をさまして!あやつられたももこ)	January 20, 2002
150	50	"Good Bye, Witch Apprentices"; Transliteration: "Sayonara Majo Minarai" (Japanese: さよなら魔女見習)	January 27, 2002

==== Sidestory: Ojamajo Doremi Na-i-sho ====
No.	Title	Original release date
1	"A Screwed Up Bicycle Trip: The Boys' Secret"; Transliteration: "Haran no Cycling ~Otokonoko no Naisho~" (Japanese: 波乱のサイクリング 〜男の子のないしょ〜)	June 26, 2004
2	"MAHO-DOU in New York: Momoko's Secret"; Transliteration: "New York no MAHO-Dou ~Momoko no Naisho~" (Japanese: N.YのMAHO堂 〜ももこのないしょ〜)	July 10, 2004
3	"The Value of Swimming!: Aiko's Secret"; Transliteration: "Oyoide Nanbo! ~Aiko no Naisho~" (Japanese: 泳いでナンボ!〜あいこのないしょ〜)	July 24, 2004
4	"Non-standard: Onpu's Secret"; Transliteration: "NonSutandādo ~Onpu no Naisho~" (Japanese: ノンスタンダード〜おんぷのないしょ〜)	August 7, 2004
5	"Someone Who Knows the Sorrow: Pop and Hana's Secret~"; Transliteration: "Namida wo Shiru Hito ~Poppu to Hana no Naisho~" (Japanese: 涙を知るひと〜ぽっぷとハナのないしょ〜)	August 21, 2004
6	"Memories in Confeito: Baaya's Secret"; Transliteration: "Konpeitou no Omoide ~Baaya no Naisho~" (Japanese: 金平糖の思い出〜ばあやのないしょ〜)	September 4, 2004
7	"I Love Taiyaki!: Father and Son's Secret"; Transliteration: "Taiyaki Daisuki! ~Oyako no Naisho~" (Japanese: タイヤキダイスキ!〜親子のないしょ〜)	September 18, 2004
8	"Flute Incident!: An Honor Student's Secret"; Transliteration: "Recorder Jiken! ~Yuutousei no Naisho~" (Japanese: リコーダー事件!〜優等生のないしょ〜)	October 2, 2004
9	"Excellent Baseball Team: The Witches' Secret"; Transliteration: "Bacchiguu Yakyuubu ~Majo-tachi no Naisho~" (Japanese: バッチグー野球部〜魔女たちのないしょ〜)	October 16, 2004
10	"Marriage Promise: Childhood Friend's Secret"; Transliteration: "Kekkon no Yakusoku ~Osana Najimi no Naisho~" (Japanese: 結婚の約束〜幼なじみのないしょ〜)	October 30, 2004
11	"Valentine's Day: Hazuki's Secret"; Transliteration: "Valentine Day ~Hazuki no Naisho~" (Japanese: バレンタインディ〜はづきのないしょ〜)	November 13, 2004
12	"The Seventh Witch Apprentice: Non-chan's Secret"; Transliteration: "Shichi-nin Me no Majo Minarai ~Non-chan no Naisho~" (Japanese: 7人目の魔女見習い〜のんちゃんのないしょ〜)	November 27, 2004
13	"The Doll that Traveled Through Time: Doremi's Secret"; Transliteration: "Toki o Kakeru Ohina-sama ~Doremi no Naisho~" (Japanese: 時をかけるお雛様〜どれみのないしょ〜)	December 11, 2004

=== Series 4: Ojamajo Doremi Dokkān! ===
No. overall	No. in season	Title	Original release date
151	1	"Doremi's Surprise! A New Ojamajo"; Transliteration: "Doremi Bikkuri! Atarashi no Ojamajo" (Japanese: どれみびっくり!新しいおジャ魔女)	February 3, 2002
152	2	"Hana Becomes a Sixth Grade Student!"; Transliteration: "Hana-chan Roku Nensei ni Naru!" (Japanese: ハナちゃん6年生になる!)	February 10, 2002
153	3	"Hana Will Not Give Up!"; Transliteration: "Hana-chan ni wa Makerarenai!" (Japanese: ハナちゃんには負けられない!)	February 17, 2002
154	4	"Maho-Dou Goes Bankrupt!?"; Transliteration: "Maho-Dou ga Tsuburechau!?" (Japanese: MAHO堂がつぶれちゃう!?)	February 24, 2002
155	5	"Onpu's Unpainted Face"; Transliteration: "Sugao no Onpu" (Japanese: 素顔のおんぷ)	March 3, 2002
156	6	"The Class Library's Combination is Missing!?"; Transliteration: "Gakkyuu Bunko no Mei Konbi!?" (Japanese: 学級文庫の迷コンビ!?)	March 10, 2002
157	7	"Open! Door of the Heart"; Transliteration: "Hiraite! Kokoro no Tobira" (Japanese: 開いて!心のとびら)	March 17, 2002
158	8	"Found Out!? Hana's Secret"; Transliteration: "Barechatta!? Hana-chan no Himitsu" (Japanese: ばれちゃった!?ハナちゃんのひみつ)	March 24, 2002
159	9	"Hazuki's Shining Star"; Transliteration: "Hazuki no Kira-kira Boshi" (Japanese: はづきのキラキラ星)	March 31, 2002
160	10	"Field Trip!! Being a Leader is Hard"; Transliteration: "Shuugakuryokou!! Hanchou ha Tsurai yo" (Japanese: 修学旅行!!班長はツラいよ)	April 7, 2002
161	11	"Nara! A Fated Meeting"; Transliteration: "Nara! Unmei no Saikai" (Japanese: 奈良!運命の再会)	April 14, 2002
162	12	"Kyoto! Never-Ending Night"; Transliteration: "Kyoto! Owaranai Yoru" (Japanese: 京都!終わらない夜)	April 21, 2002
163	13	"Mutsumi's Retirement Announcement!"; Transliteration: "Mutsumi no Intai Sengen!" (Japanese: むつみの引退宣言!)	April 28, 2002
164	14	"Laziness is the Greatest Enemy! Level 7 Exam"; Transliteration: "Yudantaiteki! Nana Kyuu Shiken" (Japanese: 油断大敵!7級試験)	May 5, 2002
165	15	"Mother's Obstinacy"; Transliteration: "Okaasan no Wakarazuya" (Japanese: お母さんのわからずや)	May 12, 2002
166	16	"How to Make a Rainbow That Doesn't Disappear"; Transliteration: "Kienai Niji no Tsukurikata" (Japanese: 消えない虹の作り方)	May 19, 2002
167	17	"Protect the Secret Base!"; Transliteration: "Himitsu Kichi wo Mamore!" (Japanese: 秘密基地を守れ!)	May 26, 2002
168	18	"Sweetheart's Whereabouts are Woof, Woof, Woof"; Transliteration: "Koi no Yukue wa Wanwanwan" (Japanese: 恋の行方はワンワンワン)	June 2, 2002
169	19	"Father Cannot Be Honest!?"; Transliteration: "Otousan wa Sunao ni Narenai!?" (Japanese: お父さんは素直になれない!?)	June 9, 2002
170	20	"The Search for Momoko's Dream"; Transliteration: "Momoko no Yume Sagashi" (Japanese: ももこの夢探し)	June 16, 2002
171	21	"I Love You! Oyajide"; Transliteration: "Daisuki! Oyajiide" (Japanese: 大好き!オヤジーデ)	June 23, 2002
172	22	"Don't Go, Kimitaka!!"; Transliteration: "Kimitaka Ikanaide!!" (Japanese: きみたか行かないで!!)	June 30, 2002
173	23	"Tanabata Somehow Stopped!"; Transliteration: "Tanabata Nante Yaameta!" (Japanese: 七夕なんてやーめた!)	July 7, 2002
174	24	"With Love and Justice! We Are Majo Ranger!"; Transliteration: "Ai yo Seigi yo! Watashitachi Majo Ranger!" (Japanese: 愛よ正義よ!私たちマジョレンジャー!)	July 14, 2002
175	25	"Will You Smile? The Mysterious Glass"; Transliteration: "Egao wo Kureru? Nazo no Glass" (Japanese: 笑顔をくれる?謎のグラス)	July 21, 2002
176	26	"Camp and Curry are Hot, Hot, Hot!?"; Transliteration: "Camp to Curry de Acchicchi!?" (Japanese: キャンプとカレーでアッチッチ!?)	July 28, 2002
177	27	"White Elephant, Nice to Meet You!"; Transliteration: "Shiroi Zou-san, Hajimemashite!" (Japanese: 白いゾウさん、はじめまして!)	August 4, 2002
178	28	"We Can't Compete Against Grandmas!?"; Transliteration: "Obaachan Zuni wa Kanawanai!?" (Japanese: おばあちゃんズにはかなわない!?)	August 11, 2002
179	29	"Don't Let Go! Hand in Hand"; Transliteration: "Hanasanaide! Tsunaide Te to Te" (Japanese: はなさないで!つないだ手と手)	August 18, 2002
180	30	"Suspicious Shadow!? The Chest of the Witch World"; Transliteration: "Ayashii Kage!? Majo-kai no Mune Sawagi" (Japanese: あやしい影!?魔女界の胸さわぎ)	August 25, 2002
181	31	"Pao is a Bothersome Elephant!?"; Transliteration: "Pao-chan wa Ojama Zou!?" (Japanese: パオちゃんはおジャ魔ゾウ!?)	September 1, 2002
182	32	"Even a Good Child Worries"; Transliteration: "Iiko Datte Nounderu" (Japanese: いい子だって悩んでる)	September 8, 2002
183	33	"Lost Onpu"; Transliteration: "Mayoeru Onpu" (Japanese: 迷えるおんぷ)	September 15, 2002
184	34	"Baba and Forever"; Transliteration: "Baba to Itsumademo" (Japanese: ババといつまでも)	September 22, 2002
185	35	"Level 4 exam is Lo, Lo, Lo, Lo?"; Transliteration: "Yon Kyuu Shiken wa no Rorororo?" (Japanese: 4級試験はのろろろろ〜?)	September 29, 2002
186	36	"The Bicycle That Goes Anywhere"; Transliteration: "Jidensha de Doko made mo" (Japanese: 自転車でどこまでも)	October 6, 2002
187	37	"Disarray!? Sleeping Wizards"; Transliteration: "Zenmetsu!? Nemureru Mahoutsukai-tachi" (Japanese: 全滅!?眠れる魔法使いたち)	October 13, 2002
188	38	"Finally a Second Marriage!? Aiko's Decision"; Transliteration: "Tsui ni Saikon!? Aiko no Ketsui" (Japanese: ついに再婚!?あいこの決意)	October 20, 2002
189	39	"Wholeheartedly! A Happy White Rose"; Transliteration: "Kokoro wo Komete! Sachise no Shiroi Bara" (Japanese: 心をこめて!幸せの白いバラ)	October 27, 2002
190	40	"Doremi and the Witch That Stopped Being a Witch"; Transliteration: "Doremi to Majo wo Yameta Majo" (Japanese: どれみと魔女をやめた魔女)	November 10, 2002
191	41	"Pop Becomes a Witch Early On!?"; Transliteration: "Poppu ga Saki ni Majo ni Naru!?" (Japanese: ぽっぷが先に魔女になる!?)	November 17, 2002
192	42	"I Have to Decide!? Hazuki's Road"; Transliteration: "Jibun de Kimeru!? Hazuki no Michi" (Japanese: 自分で決める!?はづきの道)	November 24, 2002
193	43	"Level 1 Exam! Tamaki's Desperate Situation!!"; Transliteration: "Ichi Kyuu Shiken! Tamaki Zettai Zetsumei!!" (Japanese: 1級試験!玉木絶対絶命!!)	December 1, 2002
194	44	"Hurry, Urgent! Final Clue!"; Transliteration: "Isoganakya! Saigo no Tegakari" (Japanese: 急がなきゃ!最後の手がかり)	December 8, 2002
195	45	"Brambles of Sorrow, Disappear!"; Transliteration: "Kanashimi no Ibara yo, Kiete!" (Japanese: 悲しみのイバラよ、消えて!)	December 15, 2002
196	46	"Farewell, Curse of the Witch-Frogs!"; Transliteration: "Saraba, Majo-Gaeru no Noroi" (Japanese: さらば、魔女ガエルの呪い)	December 22, 2002
197	47	"Even If You Go Far Away"; Transliteration: "Tatoe Tooku Hanaretemo" (Japanese: たとえ遠くはなれても)	December 29, 2002
198	48	"Aiko's Number One Happy Day"; Transliteration: "Aiko no Ichiban Shiawase na Hi" (Japanese: あいこのいちばん幸せな日)	January 5, 2003
199	49	"Forever Forever, Friends"; Transliteration: "Zutto Zutto, Friends" (Japanese: ずっとずっと、フレンズ)	January 12, 2003
200	50	"Goodbye, Ojamajo"; Transliteration: "Sayonara, Ojamajo" (Japanese: さよなら、おジャ魔女)	January 19, 2003
201	51	"Thank You! Until We Meet Again"; Transliteration: "Arigatou! Mata Au Hi made" (Japanese: ありがとう!また会う日まで)	January 26, 2003

== Movies ==
#	Title	Original air date
Movie–1	"Ojamajo Doremi Sharp The Movie"; Transliteration: "Eiga Ojamajo Doremi Shāpu" (Japanese: 映画 おジャ魔女どれみ#)	July 8, 2000
While taking her next (fifth) witch apprentice test, Pop realizes that Hana followed her into the Witch World. She follows the baby into the Queen's garden, which has many heart-petaled flowers. She decides to take one special one that stands out, which happens to be a Witch Queen Heart, capable of granting any wish. When she returns, she finds her sister and friends frantically searching for Hana. However, when trying to tell them about her successful test, Doremi completely ignores it and lectures her for taking Hana without permission. Angry with this, Pop runs away and tearfully wishes that her sister would turn into a rat, which is granted by the flower. However, this is a bad wish, and the flower changes color, gets up, and leaves. When she tells Hazuki, Aiko, and Onpu about this and finds out that her sister has been accidentally kicked out, the three head out to look for the plant before it plants itself, generates more seeds, and grants the wishes of everyone else, while Pop goes to look for her sister. After a wild chase, Doremi finds herself heading to her sister's steak bait but the two end up falling into the sewer in miniature size. There, the two make up for the past argument but are quickly surrounded by sewer rats. With the help of Hana's magic, they manage to get out just in time. Meanwhile, the other three were busily looking for the magical plant, which had been granting other's wishes. They manage to stop time and pluck it before it plants itself to spread its seeds. Majo Rika tells them that the plant must be burned, but Pop disagrees, saying it is her fault. They try Magical Stage to return it to normal, but if fails to work. It only returns to normal when they tearfully ask it to. The plant is then returned to its rightful place in the garden.
Movie–2	"Mōtto! Ojamajo Doremi: Secret of the Frog Stone"; Transliteration: "Mōtto! Ojamajo Doremi: Kaeru Ishi no Himitsu" (Japanese: も〜っと!おジャ魔女どれみ カエル石のひみつ)	July 14, 2001
Doremi, her friends, and her family are visiting Doremi's Grandparents. Aiko fears Doremi's grandfather due to an accident when she was young. The group learn of the legend of the Frog Stone and a story of a couple. The witch apprentices, minus Pop, go in search of the stone. They lose their powers, end up getting lost in the forest they're in, and talk to Aiko about what happened between her and her grandfather. The group encounter what appear to be ghosts, but were actually Doremi's father and grandfather wearing masks as part of a tradition. When they return to the cabin, Aiko's fears have receded.
Movie–3	"Looking for Magical Doremi"; Transliteration: "Majo Minarai o Sagashite" (Japanese: 魔女見習いをさがして)	November 13, 2020
