= Tsugumi Shinohara =

Japanese actor

- 篠原 愛実
- Born: March 10, 1993 (age 33); Tokyo, Japan
- Occupations: Actress; model
- Years active: 2001–2012
- Agent: Production Ogi (2005-2012)

Tsugumi Shinohara (篠原 愛実, Shinohara Tsugumi; born March 10, 1993) is a former Japanese actress and model. From June 2007 to April 2009, she was an exclusive model for the magazine Pichi Lemon.

== Career ==
On December 3, 2012, Shinohara posted on her blog that she was retiring from entertainment on December 31, 2012. After retiring, in 2014, Shinohara revealed that she is employed at Pony Canyon in the advertising department.

== Filmography ==
=== Television ===
Year	Title	Role	Network	Notes	Ref(s)
2002	Ninpu Sentai Hurricaneger		TV Asahi	Minor role	
2004	Tensai TV-kun Max	Herself	NHK	Regular from 2004 to 2006	
2009	Shōkōjo Seira	Hinako Kawahara	TBS	Supporting role	—
2011	Misaki Number 1	Tsugumi Nozaki	NTV	Minor role	
2011	Umareru	Yuki Koyama	TBS	Supporting role	
2011	Motto Atsuizo! Nekogaya!!	Mitsuko Warejūin	BS Asahi	Lead role	
2011	Switch Girl!!	Meika Kizaki	Fuji TV 2	Supporting role	—
2012	Kuro no Onna Kyōshi	Fūka Midorikawa	TBS	Supporting role	
2012	Switch Girl!! 2	Meika Kizaki	Fuji TV 2	Supporting role	—

=== Film ===
Year	Title	Role	Notes	Ref(s)
2008	Aoi Tori	Sae Takagi	Supporting role	
2012	Real Onigokko 4	Mina	Supporting role	

=== Theater ===
Year	Title	Role	Notes	Ref(s)
2001	Ojamajo Kids	Hana	Lead role	

=== Solo DVDs ===
List of solo DVDs, with selected chart positions, sales figures and certifications
Title	Year	Details	Peak chart positions	Sales
Title	Year	Details	JPN	Sales
Tsugumi (つぐみ)	2011	Released: September 22, 2011; Label: Internet Frontier; Formats: DVD	—	—
"—" denotes releases that did not chart or were not released in that region.
