= Hello! Spank =

Japanese manga series

- Promotional image from Ohayō! Spank featuring the main character

おはよう!スパンク (Ohayō! Supanku)
- Genre: Comedy
- Manga
- Written by: Shun'ichi Yukimuro
- Illustrated by: Shizue Takanashi
- Published by: Kodansha
- Magazine: Nakayoshi
- Original run: February 1979 – March 1982
- Volumes: 7
- Anime television series
- Directed by: Shigetsugu Yoshida
- Produced by: Sadahiko Murasawa (ABC); Hiroshi Ogino (Asatsu); Shizuhiko Sengoku (Tokyo Movie)
- Music by: Kouji Makaino; Tetsuo Ueno
- Studio: Tokyo Movie Shinsha
- Original network: ANN (ABC, TV Asahi)
- Original run: March 7, 1981 – May 29, 1982
- Episodes: 66
- Anime film
- Directed by: Shigetsugu Yoshida
- Music by: Kouji Makaino; Tetsuo Ueno
- Studio: Tokyo Movie Shinsha
- Released: March 13, 1982
- Runtime: 95 minutes

Hello! Spank (おはよう!スパンク, Ohayō! Supanku; lit. Good morning! Spank) is a Japanese shōjo manga written by Shun'ichi Yukimuro and illustrated by Shizue Takanashi. The series has been adapted as an anime television series, broadcast in Japan from 1981 to 1982 for 66 episodes, and a theatrical movie released in 1982. In 1981, it received the Kodansha Manga Award for the shōjo category.

== Plot ==
Spank (voiced by Noriko Tsukase), the main character and regular protagonist, is a dog whose owner went missing on the high seas. While awaiting his return Spank strays at the beach every day. One day he meets Aiko Morimura (voiced by Mari Okamoto), a junior high school student, whose father also went missing on a yacht tour ten years ago. Her mother, a designer of hats, left for Paris, leaving Aiko in the care of her uncle, Mr. Fujinami.

Abandoned, Aiko believes that her father is still alive and awaits his return (but actually, he's already dead). She has recently lost her pet dog, Papi, a good-bye present from her mother, in a car accident, leaving her totally devastated. In the course of the anime, Spank begins to lighten up her gloomy mood as he is a clumsy, merry, big-hearted dog. Whereas, Spank finds his love in the pet cat of Aiko's classmate. However, later, he finds in love with a blue dog named Fan Fan. At the end of the anime, despite Spank ruining everything, all will be forgiven cheerfully and all will really fall in love, and everyone reconcile with Spank for various mistakes.

== Characters ==
=== Regular ===
- Spank (スパンク, Supanku) A little white dog with black/brown ears.
- Torakichi (トラ吉) A cat that is a rival but occasional friend of Spank.
- Aiko Morimura (森村 愛子, Morumura Aiko) A 14-year-old girl. She is Spank's reluctant master.

=== Main ===
- Shinako Yoshimura (芳村 科子, Yoshimura Shinako) Aiko and Ryo's friend.
- Ryoichi Shinoda (篠田 亮一, Shinoda Ryōichi) Aiko and Shinako's friend. He enjoys art like his friend Shinako.
- Seiya Tsukahara (塚原 誠也, Tsukahara Seiya) Baron's master.
- Serino Mihara (美原 せりの, Mihara Serino) A snobby rich girl. She is the same age as Aiko and her pet is a female cat named Cat.
- Oyama - Torakichi's master.
- Cat - A female cat that is a snob like her master Serino. Torakichi and Spank have a crush on her.
- Fan Fan - A cute little dog. Spank has a crush on her.
- Baron - A dog friend of Torakichi and Spank.
