= Shizue Takanashi =

Japanese manga artist

- Area: manga artist
- Notable works: Ohayō! Spank; Ojamajo Doremi
- Awards: Kodansha Manga Award

Shizue Takanashi (たかなししずえ, Takanashi Shizue) is a Japanese manga artist known for illustrating the manga series of the girls' anime Ojamajo Doremi. In 1981, she won the Kodansha Manga Award for shōjo for Ohayō! Spank.
