= Ojamajo Doremi season 1 =

Ojamajo Doremi
- Season 1
- No. of episodes: 51

Release
- Original network: TV Asahi
- Original release: February 7, 1999 – January 30, 2000

Series chronology
- Next → Ojamajo Doremi Sharp

Ojamajo Doremi was originally broadcast on TV Asahi from February 7, 1999, to January 30, 2000, with a total of 51 episodes. The show was directed by Junichi Sato and Takuya Igarashi, while the animation was produced by Toei Animation. It replaced the time slot of Yume no Crayon Oukoku when that show ended. After Ojamajo Doremi ended, it was followed up by a direct sequel, Ojamajo Doremi Sharp.

The opening theme song for Ojamajo Doremi is "Ojamajo Carnival!!" (おジャ魔女カニバール!!, Ojamajo Kanibaru!!) by MAHO-Do, which won the 1999 Kobe AM Award. The ending theme song is "Surely Tomorrow Will" (きっと明日は, Kitto Ashita wa), performed by Saeko Shu. When 4Kids Entertainment adapted the show, the opening theme was replaced with a new R&B song titled "Just Like Magic", while the ending credits sequence plays an instrumental version.

In 2003, 4Kids Entertainment began working on a licensing contract with Toei Animation with plans of increasing the female television demographic for their Saturday morning block, but the deal was not sealed until 2004. Although initially planned for debut in November 2005, the show appeared in the United States on 4Kids TV with a preview episode on August 13, 2005. Episodes began regularly airing on September 10, 2005; they aired 26 episodes by March 11, 2006. After that, the show was in reruns until August 19, 2006. Magical DoReMi continued its run on November 13, 2007, exclusively on the network's web site and released its last episode on May 2, 2008. The first 26 episodes were grouped into one season, while the remaining episodes were grouped as "season 2" on 4Kids TV's website.

Reruns aired on The CW network from April 24, 2010 (part of The CW4Kids programming block) to July 17, 2010

The English version by 4Kids Entertainment was adapted for Western audiences, and carried a TV-Y rating. Additionally, episode 30 from the original Japanese version of the show was skipped, having never been dubbed and released in English.

The English dub streaming on Toei Animation YouTube channel as part of the "Summer Weekend Splash" live event from June 28 to September 20, 2025

== Episode list ==
No.	Japanese translated title/English title	Original release date	English air date
1	"I'm Doremi! I'm a Witch Apprentice" ("Now I Am a Witchling"); Transliteration: "Watashi Doremi! Majo Minarai ni Naru" (Japanese: 私どれみ! 魔女見習いになる)	February 7, 1999	September 10, 2005
Doremi Harukaze/Dorie Goodwyn comes across a magic shop and calls out the owner, Majo Rika/Patina, for being a witch, turning the latter into a witch frog. Now, she must become a witch apprentice herself to return Majo Rika to her normal self.
2	"I, Become Hazuki-chan!" ("Being Dorie, Being Reanne"); Transliteration: "Watashi, Hazuki-chan ni Naru!" (Japanese: 私、はづきちゃんになる!)	February 14, 1999	September 17, 2005
Doremi and her best friend Hazuki Fujiwara/Reanne Griffith want to swap lives for a day, as they both feel that the other is luckier. However, this leads to a few consequences.
3	"The Transfer Student from Naniwa! Aiko Debuts" ("The Spit Curl Girl"); Transliteration: "Tenkōsei wa Naniwa-ko! Aiko Tōjō" (Japanese: 転校生はナニワっこ! あいこ登場)	February 21, 1999	September 24, 2005
A new girl named Aiko Senoo/Mirabelle Haywood from Osaka/Buttercorn Ridge transfers to Doremi's class and unintentionally upsets Doremi and Hazuki at first. Once Doremi gets to know her, she befriends her and tries to find ways to cheer her up on Parents' Day at school.
4	"It's Not Scary If We're All Witches" ("Dustin' the Old Rusty Broom"); Transliteration: "Minna Majo Nara Kowakunai" (Japanese: みんな魔女なら怖くない)	February 28, 1999	August 13, 2005
Hazuki and Aiko find out Doremi's secret of being a witch apprentice after the stunt she pulls on Parents' Day, so they must also become witch apprentices to protect Doremi. The three girls redecorate the magic shop with a more cheerful design after Doremi accidentally destroys the shop. Note: This episode aired as a series preview one month before the actual premiere of Magical DoReMi on 4Kids TV.
5	"Grand Opening! House Of Magic" ("Witch Conya of the Lunaverse"); Transliteration: "Shinsō Kaiten! Mahōdō" (Japanese: 新装開店! MAHO堂)	March 7, 1999	October 8, 2005
After fixing up the magic shop and dubbing it House of Magic (Mahōdō)/The DoReMi Magic Shop, the girls await their first customers and are visited by a singing witch wholesaler Dela/Witch Conya.
6	"A Liar's First Friendship" ("Believing Belinda"); Transliteration: "Usotsuki wa Yūjō no Hajimari" (Japanese: ウソつきは友情の始まり)	March 14, 1999	October 15, 2005
Nobuko Yokokawa/Belinda Higgins is a liar in the girls' class, but nevertheless amuses everyone with her imaginative stories. When Aiko believes in her and realizes she lied, she becomes very hurt.
7	"Aim For Level 9! Witch Exam" ("Caitlyn's Day Out"); Transliteration: "Mezase Kyu-kyū! Majo Shiken" (Japanese: めざせ9級! 魔女試験)	March 21, 1999	October 22, 2005
The three girls prepare to take their first witch exam, but Doremi must spend the day supervising her younger sister Pop/Caitlyn Goodwyn. Pop wants to go to her grandparents' house by train by herself. When it comes to exam time, Hazuki and Aiko earn fairies for passing the exam. Doremi fails the exam, so she doesn't get a fairy.
8	"Go to the Witch World!!" ("Finally a Fairy!"); Transliteration: "Majo no Sekai he Go!!" (Japanese: 魔女の世界へGO!!)	March 28, 1999	October 29, 2005
After failing to pass the level 9 exam, Doremi is given another chance. Her goal is to find medicine for Motamota. Luckily, Doremi passes and gets her fairy, but she does it with the help of Aiko and Hazuki, who come to see her out of worry.
9	"Where Did You Go!? Fairy Dodo" ("A Runaway Fairy"); Transliteration: "Doko Ittano!? Yōsei Dodo" (Japanese: どこ行ったの!? 妖精ドド)	April 4, 1999	November 5, 2005
Doremi's fairy Dodo runs off after being scolded, so the girls use their new magic spell, Magical Stage, to try to find her.
10	"Pinch! The Teacher Found Out!!" ("Trouble in Store"); Transliteration: "Pinchi! Sensei ni Barechatta!!" (Japanese: ピンチ! 先生にバレちゃった!!)	April 11, 1999	November 12, 2005
Miss Seki/Miss Cooper and the vice principal drop by the magic shop after photos of the girls working there arise.
11	"Early Riser Girl Marina and a Bouquet from the Heart" ("You Don't Bring Me Flowers"); Transliteration: "Hayaoki Shōjo Marina to Kokoro no Hanataba" (Japanese: 早起き少女まりなと心の花たば)	April 11, 1999	November 19, 2005
After being insulted by Takao Kimura/ David, Marina Koizumi/ Amanda refuses to take care of the school's flowers. Hazuki is determined to help Marina realize Kimura is remorseful.
12	"A Wish For A Precious Shirt" ("He Ain't Pelé, He's My Brother"); Transliteration: "Taisetsu na Shatsu no Negaigoto" (Japanese: 大切なシャツの願い事)	April 25, 1999	November 26, 2005
A young boy named Misaki Shibayama/Evan trades in his favorite shirt to get a charm to help his older brother Daichi/Charlie play in a soccer game.
13	"Everyone Fails!? The Level 8 Exam" ("Parsley and Rosemary"); Transliteration: "Minna Fugōkaku!? Yattsu-kyū Shiken" (Japanese: みんな不合格!? 8級試験)	May 2, 1999	December 3, 2005
The girls take the Level 8 Exam in which they have three hours to clear three obstacles unknowingly chosen beforehand.
14	"Laugh and Forgive Me!?" ("A Tall Order"); Transliteration: "Waratte Yurushite!?" (Japanese: 笑って許して!?)	May 9, 1999	December 10, 2005
Naomi Okuyama/Gia is insulted by the SOS Trio for showing her feminine side and refuses to forgive them until they make her laugh.
15	"Majorika Goes to Kindergarten" ("Patina Goes to Kindergarten"); Transliteration: "Majorika Yōchien ni Iku" (Japanese: マジョリカ幼稚園に行く)	May 16, 1999	February 4, 2006
Majo Rika gets purchased by Pop. Pop treats Majorika like a plush toy and she takes her to school one day.
16	"Fishing for Love" ("Gone Fishin'"); Transliteration: "Koi wo Tsuriageyou" (Japanese: 恋を釣り上げよう)	May 23, 1999	February 4, 2006
Doremi's father takes her and her friends on a fishing trip with a young boy who shares his passion.
17	"Yada is a Delinquent!?" ("Sketches of Pain"); Transliteration: "Yada-kun wa Furyō Shōgakusei?" (Japanese: 矢田くんは不良小学生!?)	May 30, 1999	February 11, 2006
Masaru Yada/Justin gets arrested, and no one else besides Hazuki and Miss Seki believes that he did nothing wrong. With Miss Seki's job on the line, Doremi, Hazuki, and Aiko use their magic to find out if the rumors behind Yada are true.
18	"Don't Use That! The Forbidden Magic" ("The Flora Test"); Transliteration: "Tsukuccha Dame! Kinjirareta Mahō" (Japanese: 使っちゃダメ! 禁じられた魔法)	June 6, 1999	February 11, 2006
After a fluke grants them immediate success on the Level 7 Exam, the girls find out that Nanako Okada/Autumn refuses to take care of the school's rabbits and use their new powers to find out why. They learn that Nanako once lost her puppy and is afraid to have another pet because she thinks the same thing might happen.
19	"Hazuki is Kidnapped!" ("Uncle Mick and his Sidekick"); Transliteration: "Hazuki-chan Yūkai Sareru!" (Japanese: はづきちゃん誘拐される!)	June 13, 1999	February 18, 2006
On the last day without magic for breaking the laws of the Witch World, Hazuki is kidnapped by two conmen and only Doremi and Aiko can rescue her. Note: For the English dub, the plot was adapted so that Reanne spends the day with her uncle and his friend, Dorie and Mirabelle are mistaken that she has been kidnapped.
20	"The Rival Makes Her Appearance! The House of Magic is in a Pinch!!" ("Get on the Bus"); Transliteration: "Raibaru Tōjō! Mahōdō Dai Pīnchi!!" (Japanese: ライバル登場! MAHO堂大ピ〜ンチ!!)	June 20, 1999	February 18, 2006
Majo Rika loses her shop to Dela in a card game, and her arch-rival Majoruka/Petunia takes over.
21	"Majo Ruka's Goods are Filled with Danger" ("The Mystery Wind"); Transliteration: "Majoruka Guzzu wa Kiken ga Ippai" (Japanese: マジョルカグッズは危険がいっぱい)	June 27, 1999	February 25, 2006
After noticing that the people around them are becoming ill due to Majo Ruka's charms, Aiko, Doremi, and Hazuki use their magic to break the spell.
22	"The Road to the Level 6 Witch is Long!?" ("We Need a Wandawhirl"); Transliteration: "Roku-kyū Majo he no Michi wa Tōi!?" (Japanese: 6級魔女への道は遠い!?)	July 4, 1999	February 25, 2006
With the shop under enemy control, the girls must find a way to get in to take their Level 6 Exam and earn their Kururu Porons/Wandawhirls.
23	"Big Turnaround!? Ojamajo's Training" ("Mirabelle's Blues"); Transliteration: "Daigyakuten!? Ojamajo no Shiren" (Japanese: 大逆転!? おジャ魔女の試練)	July 11, 1999	March 4, 2006
After her father gives Aiko a new harmonica and decides to throw away the old, cherished one, she runs off to Hazuki's house. There, they find an extra magic bead, which they use to gain entrance to their exam.
24	"Majoruka Versus Level 6 Ojamajos!" ("Down in the Dumps"); Transliteration: "Majoruka Tai Roku-kyū Ojamajo!" (Japanese: マジョルカ対6級おジャ魔女!)	July 18, 1999	March 4, 2006
The girls get a hold of Majo Ruka's crystal ball and are challenged to a magical duel for control of the shop.
25	"Ojamajo Pop Appears!" ("The New Witch on the Block"); Transliteration: "Ojamajo Poppu Tōjō!?" (Japanese: おジャ魔女ぽっぷ登場!?)	July 25, 1999	March 11, 2006
Pop is appointed as a witch apprentice after witnessing her sister and friends perform magic. She uses magic to create ghosts at her kindergarten sleepover, and Doremi, Hazuki, and Aiko help clean up her mess.
26	"We are the, Pureleine!" ("That Darn Evil Cat"); Transliteration: "Watashi-tachi, Pyuarēnu!" (Japanese: わたしたち、ピュアレーヌ!)	August 1, 1999	March 11, 2006
When returning the injured Kanae Ida/Haley to her father's steak shop, Doremi and the others discover the pall of bad luck covering the place and set out to uncover the mystery. They are appointed as Pureleine by the Queen to capture Bad Cards, as they have hearts pure enough to be able to do so.
27	"Oyajide Arrives!?" ("You Ought Not to Be in Pictures"); Transliteration: "Oyajīde ga Yattekita!?" (Japanese: オヤジーデがやってきた!?)	August 8, 1999	November 20, 2007
The girls receive the Pureleine Personal Computer from the Queen to capture the Bad Cards that exist in the Human World. Upon start-up, they are introduced to Oyajide/Feradasio, the captive wizard who let loose the cards.
28	"Love is a Windy Ride Over a Plateau" ("Love Serving Love"); Transliteration: "Koi wa Kōgen no Kaze ni Notte" (Japanese: 恋は高原の風に乗って)	August 15, 1999	November 27, 2007
Doremi comes across a cute tennis player named Yutaka Kashiwag at Hazuki's summer house and falls head over heels for him, but her snobby classmate Reika Tamaki/Josie also has an eye on him.
29	"The Tap Disappeared at the Festival!" ("To Catch A Thief"); Transliteration: "Natsu Matsuri ni Tappu ga Kieta!" (Japanese: 夏祭りにタップが消えた!)	August 22, 1999	November 13, 2007
Doremi accidentally loses her tap at the Summer Festival.
30	"I Want to Meet the Ghost!"; Transliteration: "Yūrei ni Aitai!" (Japanese: ユウレイに会いたい!)	August 29, 1999	Unaired
Doremi, Hazuki, Aiko, and their classmates head to Nobuaki Yamauchi's temple to share ghost stories and test their courage.
31	"Presents from Mongolia" ("Careful What You Witch For"); Transliteration: "Monguru Kara no Okurimono" (Japanese: モンゴルからのおくりもの)	September 5, 1999	December 4, 2007
Upon returning to school from summer vacation, the girls become interested in their classmate Shino Hanada's trip to Mongolia. At the same time, they are due to take the Level 5 Exam.
32	"Defeat Tamaki! The Class President Election" ("Scooter For President"); Transliteration: "Datō Tamaki! Gakkyūīn Senkyō" (Japanese: 打倒玉木! 学級委員選挙)	September 12, 1999	December 11, 2007
Masaharu Miyamoto/Scooter, with the support of Doremi and her friends, challenges Tamaki's bid for class president.
33	"Panic at the Sports Festival" ("Born to Run"); Transliteration: "Undōkai wa Panikku ga Ippai!" (Japanese: 運動会はパニックがいっぱい!)	September 19, 1999	December 18, 2007
It's the day of the school's Sports Festival, but trouble begins to plague the events.
34	"I Want to See My Mother!" ("Mo' Mirabelle's Blues"); Transliteration: "Okā-chan ni Aitai!" (Japanese: お母ちゃんに逢いたい!)	September 26, 1999	December 21, 2007
Aiko's mother comes to visit, but she is unable to face her daughter. Upon finding out, Aiko heads to her mother's house in Hannan City/Dover City to meet her.
35	"The Transfer Student is a Witch Apprentice!?" ("The Lyin' Witch and her Wardrobe"); Transliteration: "Tenkōsei wa Majo Minarai!?" (Japanese: 転校生は魔女見習い!?)	October 3, 1999	January 2, 2008
The famous pop star and child actress Onpu Segawa/Ellie Craft becomes the new student in class. After a local audition, the girls find out that she is a witch apprentice under Majoruka.
36	"The Level 4 Exam is Do-do-do-do-do!" ("Obstacle Schmob-stacle"); Transliteration: "Yon-kyū Shiken wa Do-do-do-do-dō!" (Japanese: 四級試験はドドドドドー!)	October 10, 1999	January 8, 2008
For the Level 4 Exam, the witch apprentices must race the Witch World's fastest hare and tortoise through an obstacle course.
37	"So Many Magical Frogs!" ("The Lost Greenlings"); Transliteration: "Majo Gaeru ga Ippai!" (Japanese: 魔女ガエルがいっぱい!)	October 17, 1999	January 15, 2008
An intense storm in the Witch World blows a group of magic frogs into the Human World, and the girls must return them before anyone finds out.
38	"Ryota and the Monster of the Night" ("Of Monsters and Witchlings"); Transliteration: "Ryōta to Mayonaka no Kaijū" (Japanese: りょうたと真夜中のかいじゅう)	October 24, 1999	January 22, 2008
Ryota Hayashi/Peter is obsessed with monsters, specifically Gazamadon, and everyone scolds him for it. He becomes so upset, he puts all his monster goods away.
39	"Doremi's Boyfriend is a Middle School Student!" ("Skater Love"); Transliteration: "Doremi no Kare wa Chūgakusei!" (Japanese: どれみの彼は中学生!)	October 31, 1999	May 2, 2008
When Maki Higuchi's brother in middle school, Shuzou Higuchi, sees Onpu in her witch apprentice outfit, she uses her magic to make him fall in love with someone else, which turns out to be Doremi.
40	"Doremi Wins Easily? The Level 3 Exam" ("The 3-Door Test"); Transliteration: "Doremi Rakushō? San-kyū Shiken" (Japanese: どれみ楽勝? 3級試験)	November 14, 1999	February 5, 2008
The girls go to take the Level 3 Exam, hoping to pass so they can be granted each a seedling that eventually sprouts into a tree and yields an endless supply of magic spheres. Surprisingly, the exam is one they will have to take separately. They each must pass through a door into their own world to encounter a series of events that will test their own individual strengths and are only allowed to use magic twice. The girls also must also complete the exam in one hour or else they will fail.
41	"Father and Son: The Move Towards Victory!" ("There's no Business like Shogi Business"); Transliteration: "Chichi to Ko: Shōri no Itte!" (Japanese: 父と子·勝利への一手!)	November 21, 1999	February 12, 2008
Shota Taniyama loves the game shogi and is able to defeat the vice-principal, but his parents are against his desire to play. With the help of Miss Seki, they allow him to play in an upcoming tournament. Taniyama makes it to the final round but becomes nervous whenever he touches a certain piece. Doremi, Hazuki, and Aiko use this clue to identify the presence of a Bad Card.
42	"The Ojamajo's Fight for Justice!?" ("Morph than a Feeling"); Transliteration: "Ojamajo Seigi no Tatakai!?" (Japanese: おジャ魔女·正義の戦い!?)	November 28, 1999	February 19, 2008
Kota Amano, a boy obsessed with hero shows, is challenged to a fight by an upperclassman, who mistakenly believes he is dating Onpu.
43	"Tearful Memories of Papa and the Fireworks" ("Parental Guidance"); Transliteration: "Papa to Hanabi to Namida no Omoide" (Japanese: パパと花火と涙の思い出)	December 5, 1999	February 26, 2008
Tamaki decides to run away after thinking her father doesn't care because he never punishes her. She is accompanied by Shiori Nakayama/Susie, who has been out of school due to illness and also has problems with her father.
44	"I Want to Be a Female Pro Wrestler!" ("Candi is Dandy"); Transliteration: "Joshi Puro Resurā ni Naritai!" (Japanese: 女子プロレスラーになりたい!)	December 12, 1999	March 4, 2008
Mutsumi Kudo, the strongest fighter in class, looks up to professional wrestler Candy Itō, but becomes disappointed when she announces a possible retirement.
45	"Help Santa!" ("Saving Santa"); Transliteration: "Santa-san wo Sukue!" (Japanese: サンタさんを救え!)	December 19, 1999	March 11, 2008
An ailing Santa Claus enlists the help of Doremi and the girls to deliver presents.
46	"The Witches' Talent Show" ("Just Like Magic"); Transliteration: "Majo no Kakushi Geidaikai!" (Japanese: 魔女のかくし芸大会!)	December 26, 1999	March 18, 2008
The girls help Michiaki Watabe with his magic show when his father is unable to. For the Level 2 Exam, Doremi and friends are given the task of entertaining a group of witches at a talent show.
47	"Father's Arranged Marriage Meeting" ("The Date Crasher"); Transliteration: "Otō-chan no Omiai" (Japanese: お父ちゃんのお見合い)	January 2, 2000	March 25, 2008
Aiko's father's boss arranges a meeting with his daughter Midori for a possible marriage, but Aiko is not ready for another mother.
48	"Onpu's E-Mail was a Love Letter?" ("Geek Love"); Transliteration: "Onpu no Mēru wa Rabu Retā?" (Japanese: おんぷのメールはラブレター?)	January 9, 2000	April 1, 2008
Goji Nakata becomes one of the many victims of a prank e-mail sent by Hehe/Felina asking for a date with Onpu.
49	"I Want to Meet Papa! The Dream Placed on the Overnight Express" ("Train a Comin'"); Transliteration: "Papa ni Aeru! Yume wo Noseta Shindai Tokkyū" (Japanese: パパに会える! 夢を乗せた寝台特急)	January 16, 2000	April 8, 2008
Onpu's father, whom Onpu hasn't seen in six months, is conducting a new express train. So, she tries to get through her audition to meet him before he leaves again.
50	"The Last Witch Apprentice Exam" ("The Final Test"); Transliteration: "Saigo no Minarai Majo Shiken" (Japanese: 最後の見習い魔女試験)	January 23, 2000	April 15, 2008
The Level 1 Exam gives the girls the task of using magic to help someone and receiving thanks. However, things take a turn for the worse when their secret is discovered and spread around town.
51	"Farewell Mahodo" ("The Hardest Test of All"); Transliteration: "Sayōnara Mahōdō" (Japanese: さようならMAHO堂)	January 30, 2000	April 22, 2008
Onpu uses her magic to make everyone forget about what they discovered but is punished into a hundred-year sleep because of it. Doremi, Hazuki, and Aiko must decide if they will give up being witches to save their friend.
