= Ojamajo Doremi =

Japanese anime television series

- Cover of the first DVD video volume, featuring Doremi (pink), Aiko (blue) and Hazuki (orange)
- おジャ魔女どれみ
- Genre: Magical girl
- Created by: Izumi Todo
- Developed by: Takashi Yamada
- Directed by: Season 1: Junichi Sato; Takuya Igarashi; Sharp: Shigeyasu Yamauchi; Takuya Igarashi; Motto & Dōkkan!: Takuya Igarashi
- Music by: Keiichi Oku
- Country of origin: Japan
- Original language: Japanese
- No. of seasons: 4
- No. of episodes: 201 (Japanese); 50 (English); (list of episodes)

Production
- Production companies: ABC; Asatsu-DK; Toei Animation

Original release
- Network: ANN (ABC, TV Asahi)
- Release: February 7, 1999 – January 26, 2003

Related
- Anime film
- Directed by: Takuya Igarashi
- Written by: Takashi Yamada
- Music by: Keiichi Oku
- Studio: Toei Animation
- Released: July 8, 2000
- Runtime: 30 minutes
- Manga
- Written by: Izumi Todo
- Illustrated by: Shizue Takanashi
- Published by: Kodansha
- Magazine: Nakayoshi
- Original run: October 2000 – December 2000
- Volumes: 3
- Anime film

Mōtto! Ojamajo Doremi: Secret of the Frog Stone
- Directed by: Shigeyasu Yamauchi
- Written by: Midori Kiriyama (Note: Pen name of series writer Takashi Yamada.)
- Music by: Keiichi Oku
- Studio: Toei Animation
- Released: July 14, 2001
- Runtime: 30 minutes
- Manga

Mōtto! Ojamajo Doremi
- Written by: Izumi Todo
- Illustrated by: Shizue Takanashi
- Published by: Kodansha
- Magazine: Nakayoshi
- Published: December 2001
- Original video animation

Ojamajo Doremi Na-i-sho
- Written by: Takashi Yamada
- Music by: Keiichi Oku
- Studio: Toei Animation
- Released: June 26, 2004 – December 11, 2004
- Episodes: 13
- Original net animation

Ojamajo Doremi: Owarai Gekijō
- Music by: Keiichi Oku
- Studio: Toei Animation
- Released: March 23, 2019 – March 21, 2020
- Episodes: 26
- Original net animation

Ojamajo Doremi Nyon
- Music by: Keiichi Oku
- Studio: Toei Animation
- Released: March 28, 2026 – present
- Light novel
- Written by: Midori Kiriyama; Yumi Kageyama (20's)
- Illustrated by: Yoshihiko Umakoshi
- Published by: Kodansha
- Imprint: Kodansha Ranobe Bunko
- Original run: December 2, 2011 – October 2, 2019
- Volumes: 10
- Anime film
- Looking for Magical Doremi (2020)

Ojamajo Doremi (おジャ魔女どれみ; lit. "Bothersome Witch Doremi"), known as Magical DoReMi in English, is a Japanese fantasy magical girl anime television series produced by Toei Animation. It focuses on a group of elementary school girls, led by Doremi Harukaze, who become witch apprentices. The series aired in Japan on ABC, TV Asahi, and other ANN affiliates between February 1999 and January 2003, spanning four seasons and 201 episodes, and was followed by an original video animation series released between June and December 2004. An English-language version of the first season, produced by 4Kids Entertainment, aired in North America in 2005.

Ojamajo Doremi has inspired two companion films, manga adaptations, video games, and a light novel sequel series. A 20th anniversary film titled Looking for Magical Doremi was released on November 13, 2020.

== Plot ==
=== Ojamajo Doremi ===
Doremi Harukaze, a third-grade elementary schoolgirl living in the fictional Japanese town of Misora, comes across a magic shop known as the Maho-dou (MAHO堂; lit. "House of Magic") and accidentally discovers that its owner, Majo Rika, is a witch. Due to a curse placed on any witch whose identity is exposed by a human, Majo Rika is transformed into a witch frog. Wanting to return to her original form, Majo Rika makes Doremi her witch apprentice, giving her the ability to cast magic. Determined to become a fully-fledged witch capable of turning Majo Rika back into a human, Doremi has to pass nine different witch tests while also keeping her identity a secret from other humans. Doremi is soon joined by her two best friends, Hazuki Fujiwara and Aiko Senoo, and later by her younger sister, Pop Harukaze, who all become witch apprentices.

Midway through the series, Doremi and the others come across a rival witch apprentice, Onpu Segawa, who has been using forbidden magic to influence people's memories. After passing the final witch test, their identities are revealed to their families and friends. Onpu wipes the memories of those that attempt to expose them to prevent their identities from being revealed. She uses forbidden magic too many times, losing control of it. In order to save Onpu from an eternal sleep, the girls give up their magical powers to awaken her.

=== Ojamajo Doremi Sharp ===
Entering fourth grade, Doremi and the others sneak into the Witch World to visit Majo Rika. They witness the birth of a magical baby who is named Hana and will be the candidate for the next queen. As witch law dictates that whoever witnesses a magical baby's birth must take care of it for a year, Doremi and the others are once again made witch apprentices, tasked with raising Hana. While also taking care of the Maho-Do, which has now become a gardening store, the girls must ensure Hana's growth and help her pass several health examinations held by the Witch World's head nurse, Majo Heart.

Meanwhile, a wizard named Oyajide attempts to kidnap Hana to help aid the Wizard World, later enlisting the help of four young wizards known as the Flat4, who tried to get close to Doremi and the others to kidnap Hana but liked them later. The witch apprentices help mend relations between the Witch World and Wizard World. However, Hana's powerful magic catches the attention of the former Witch Queen's predecessor, who slept in the cursed forest for a long time. She curses Hana to make her ill, and only the Love Supreme Flower that grows in the cursed forest can heal her. In the end, Doremi and the others succeed in picking the flower but are cursed to fall into an eternal slumber.

=== Mōtto! Ojamajo Doremi ===
The Queen of the Witch World makes Doremi and the others into witch apprentices again and tasks them to pass six pâtissier exams to become fully-fledged witches. With the Maho-do remodeled into a bakery, the witches are joined by Momoko Asuka, a returnee from the United States who initially lost experience with the Japanese culture.

Midway through the series, Hana is afflicted by a curse from the past queen again, causing her to have a dislike for vegetables which are necessary for her magical growth, prompting Doremi and the girls to get another chance to take care of Hana and help her get over her pickiness. After curing Hana's pickiness and passing the patissière exams, the girls appeal to the past queen, Majo Tourbillon, who had detested humans ever since she lost her human husband and grandchildren. They make her favorite dessert in her memory, the cake her husband made when he proposed to her. She reverts the curse placed upon the Love Supreme Forest, where her true form is found sleeping, protected by magical vines.

The OVA series, Ojamajo Doremi Na-i-sho!, takes place during this time frame.

=== Ojamajo Doremi Dokkān! ===
Hana, who wants to be human, uses all of her magic to physically age into a sixth grader. This results in the Maho-Do being transformed into a crafts shop and Hana's magical crystals shattering, requiring Doremi and the others to supply her with the energy needed to become a witch's apprentice. Meanwhile, the Queen discovers Majo Tourbillon's power will eventually cause both worlds to be put to sleep. As such, the Queen tasks the girls, who are assisted by Majo Tourbillon's fairy, Baba, to recreate various handmade gifts that Majo Tourbillon's six grandchildren had made and received from her in order to remind her of the happy times and break the vines imprisoning her. These vines soon start sprouting black flowers that cause people and magical beings alike to be affected with laziness, with the girls enlisting the help of Hana and a white elephant named Pao to put a stop to it.

After resolving Majo Tourbillon's misunderstanding with her grandchildren, she lifts the witch frog curse. She reminds Doremi and the others that if they become full witches, they will live longer than ordinary humans. The Ojamajos decide not to become witches and learn that they can do anything even without using magic, and they combine their respective crystal fragments into a new crystal ball for Hana. The series ends with their elementary school graduation and Majo Rika, having been reverted to a witch, returning Hana to the Witch World. Although they each go their separate ways, their friendship remains the same, and they continue to move towards their dreams.

== Characters ==
An image depicting the series' main characters. From left to right: Momoko Asuka, Aiko Senoo, Doremi Harukaze, Hana, Hazuki Fujiwara, and Onpu Segawa.

Doremi Harukaze (春風どれみ, Harukaze Doremi; Dorie Goodwyn in the English version)
Voiced by: Chiemi Chiba (Japanese); Amy Palant (English)
Portrayed by: Kasumi Suzuki (Ojamajo Kids)
Doremi is the main protagonist of the series. She is a lively and kind-hearted girl, who always cares about the people around her, but she can be selfish. Yet she also longs for love, and can come across as a little confused at times. She has an interest in witches and magic. At first, she hoped to use magic to give herself the courage to confess to the person she liked, but eventually she learned that this can be achieved even without magic. She often proclaims herself to be "the unluckiest girl in the whole world" when things do not go her way. Her favorite food is steak, but in the series she has almost failed to eat it. Her favorite instrument is the piano, but because of the shadow of her childhood performance failure, she also has complicated feelings about the piano.
Doremi's spell is "Pirika Pirilala Popolina Peperuto", while her spell in Magical Stage is "Pirika Pirilala, carefree" (ピリカピリララのびやかに, Pirika Pirirara Nobiyakani).
Her theme color is pink.

Hazuki Fujiwara (藤原はづき, Fujiwara Hazuki; Reanne Griffith in the English version)
Voiced by: Tomoko Akiya (Japanese); Rebecca Soler (English)
Portrayed by: Miya Tanaka (Ojamajo Kids)
Hazuki is a passive, gentle, and smart, but shy girl. She is from a rich family and Doremi's friend since childhood. She dared not express her thoughts to her parents because she was afraid of their sadness, even though she had her own opinion. Finally, she overcame this problem. She likes lame jokes and is very afraid of ghosts. Her talents are playing the violin and composing. At the end of Dokkan, she begins attending Karen Girls High School to realize her violin dream.
Hazuki's spell is "Paipai Ponpoi Puwapuwa Puu", while her spell in Magical Stage is "Paipai Ponpoi, flexible" (パイパイポンポイしなやかに, Paipai Ponpoi Shinayakani).
Her theme color is orange.

Aiko Senoo (妹尾あいこ, Senō Aiko; Mirabelle Haywood in the English version)
Voiced by: Yuki Matsuoka (Japanese); Kether Donohue (English)
Portrayed by Chiharu Watanabe (Ojamajo Kids)
Aiko is a transfer student from Osaka. She is a tomboyish girl with an outgoing personality, reliable, and good at sports. Her parents are divorced, so she lives with her father. She loves both her parents very much and wishes for them to get back together. Finally, with the efforts of her and the others, her parents regrouped after reflecting on and solving their problems. Her favorite instrument is a harmonica because it was bought for her by her parents before they divorced. Her favorite food is Takoyaki (chocolate chip cookies in the English version).
Aiko's spell is "Pameruku Raruku Laliloli Poppun", while her spell in Magical Stage is "Pameruku Raruku, loud" (パメルクラルクたからかに, Pameruku Raruku Takarakani).
Her theme color is blue.

Pop Harukaze (春風ぽっぷ, Harukaze Poppu; Caitlyn Goodwyn in the English version)
Voiced by: Sawa Ishige (Japanese); Liza Jacqueline (English)
Pop is Doremi's younger sister. She attends Sonatine Kindergarten for the first half of the series and then moves on to Misora First Elementary School. Pop accidentally discovers Doremi's magical powers in the first season and as such becomes a witch apprentice as well. She acts mature for her age and is more responsible than her older sister.
Pop's spell is "Pipito Purito Puritan Peperuto", while her spell in Magical Stage is "Pipito Purito, cheerful" (ピピットプリットほがらかに, Pipitto Puritto Hokarakani).
Her theme color is red.

Onpu Segawa (瀬川おんぷ, Segawa Onpu; Ellie Craft in the English version)
Voiced by: Rumi Shishido (Japanese); Anne Marie Nestor (English)
Portrayed by: Makoto Takeda (Ojamajo Kids)
Onpu is a famous Japanese child idol who became a witch apprentice of Majoruka, a rival of Majorika. She is a little bit headstrong, has a closed heart, and used to abuse forbidden magic to change the minds of others because she has an amulet to protect her from being backlashed. Eventually, however, she becomes kind-hearted and selfless by spending time with Doremi and the others, then joining them. She is eager to do well in everything, especially by her acting job. She lives with her mother, who used to be an idol herself before an accident sent her into trauma. Her favorite instrument is a flute, and favorite food is Crêpe.
Onpu's spell is "Pururun Purun Famifami Faa", while her spell in Magical Stage is "Pururun Purun, elegant" (プルルンプルンすずやかに, Pururun Purun Suzuyakani).
In Japanese, her name Onpu means "musical note".
Her theme color is purple.

Momoko Asuka (飛鳥ももこ, Asuka Momoko)
Voiced by: Nami Miyahara
Portrayed by: Chisato Maeda (Ojamajo Kids)
Momoko is a Japanese-American transfer student from New York City and was the apprentice of the late Majo Monroe. At the beginning of Motto, she only speaks English and is unfamiliar with Japanese culture, but she can use a translator intercom with her pâtissière uniform, with which she can fluently understand and speak Japanese. She becomes friends with Doremi and the others, who teach her how to speak Japanese. She is shy at first, but getting to know Doremi makes her straight-forward. She is proficient in baking, and her dream is to open a pastry shop. Her favorite instrument is a guitar.
Momoko's spell is "Perutan Petton Pararira Pon", while her spell in Magical Stage is "Perutan Petton, refreshing" (ペルタンペットンさわやかに, Perutan Petton Sawayakani).
Her theme color is yellow.

Hana (ハナちゃん, Hana-chan)
Voiced by: Ikue Otani
Portrayed by: Tsugumi Shinohara (Ojamajo Kids)
Hana is a baby witch born from a large light blue rose in the Witch Queen's Garden that produces a new baby every 100 years and the successor to the throne. Hana is given to Doremi and the others to be cared for after she stumbles across her. In Sharp, Doremi, Hazuki, Aiko, and Onpu serve as Hana's mothers (especially Doremi). Then in Motto, Momoko joined them also as Hana's mother. Although she is just a baby, she has powerful magic. In Dokkān, Hana transforms herself into an 11-year-old girl so she could attend school with her mothers and takes on the name of Hana Makihatayama (巻機山花, Makihatayama Hana). Because of this incident, her crystal ball broke into pieces, which the source of magic used by a witch, so she also became a witch apprentice in this period.
Hana's spell is "Pororin Pyuarin Hanahana Pii", while in the light novel series her spell in Magical Stage is "Pororin Pyuarin, smile" (ポロリンピュアリンにこやかに, Pororin Pyuarin Nikoyakani).
Her theme color is white.

== Media ==
=== Anime ===
Ojamajo Doremi is produced by Toei Animation and ABC. In Japan, the show aired on each of the ANN TV stations (Asahi Broadcasting Corporation (ABC, Japan), TV Asahi, Nagoya TV (Metele), and others) and Broadcasting System of San-in Inc. The show replaced the time slot for Yume no Crayon Oukoku after its end and lasted from February 7, 1999, to January 30, 2000, with a new episode airing every week. The series soon followed with direct sequels, Ojamajo Doremi # (おジャ魔女どれみ しゃーぷっ, Ojamajo Doremi Shāpu), Mōtto! Ojamajo Doremi (も〜っと! おジャ魔女どれみ), and Ojamajo Doremi Dokkān! (おジャ魔女どれみドッカ〜ン!) until January 26, 2003. Each series lasted from 49 to 51 episodes. On June 26 to December 11, 2004, a thirteen-episode original video animation series, Ojamajo Doremi Na-i-sho (おジャ魔女どれみナ・イ・ショ) was produced which takes place during the third season.

No.	Title	Run	Episodes	Note
1	Ojamajo Doremi	1999–2000	51	TV anime
2	Ojamajo Doremi #	2000–2001	49	TV anime
3	Mōtto! Ojamajo Doremi	2001–2002	50	TV anime
4	Ojamajo Doremi Dokkān!	2002–2003	51	TV anime
5	Ojamajo Doremi Na-i-sho	2004	13	OVA
6	Ojamajo Doremi: Owarai Gekijō	2019–2020	26	ONA
7	Ojamajo Doremi: Honobono Gekijō	2020	5	OVA
Total		1999–2020	245	–

A 26-episode short ONA series, titled Ojamajo Doremi: Comedy Theater (おジャ魔女どれみ お笑い劇場, Ojamajo Doremi: Owarai Gekijō), began streaming on Toei Animation's YouTube channel from March 23, 2019. In this series Doremi and her friends as high school students. A five-episode spin-off adaptation of the picture book Ojamajo Doremi Story Picture Book: The Best Present (おジャ魔女どれみ おはなしえほん さいこうの おくりもの), called Ojamajo Doremi: Heartwarming Theater (おジャ魔女どれみ ほのぼの劇場, Ojamajo Doremi: Honobono Gekijō) was exclusively produced as a reward for the Ojamajo Doremi 20th Anniversary Thanks Festival crowdfunding campaign in 2020.

Toei Animation commissioned an English dub of the pilot episode from Ocean Productions to shop for potential licensors. 4Kids Entertainment licensed the first season in North America under the title Magical DoReMi, which aired on 4Kids TV for the 2005–2006 broadcasting season. Magical DoReMi was adapted for US audiences and episode 30 is skipped in the English dub.

On November 13, 2007, the remaining episodes of the dub would be added onto the 4Kids website

Reruns of the series aired on The CW4Kids programming block from April 24 to July 17, 2010

The dub began streaming on Toei's YouTube channel as part of the Summer Weekend Splash block from June 28 to September 21, 2025

=== Manga ===
From 2000 to early 2003, the monthly shōjo manga magazine Nakayoshi ran a manga adaptation of Ojamajo Doremi illustrated by Shizue Takanashi. The manga saw several changes from the original story, such as the introduction of Bow, a new character original to the manga. The chapters were compiled into tankōbon volumes by Kodansha. Four volumes were released in total — the first three were under the title Ojamajo Doremi, covering the events of the original series and Ojamajo Doremi #. The last volume was adapted from the Mōtto! Ojamajo Doremi story arc and was titled eponymously to it.

=== Films ===
==== Ojamajo Doremi #: The Movie ====
Ojamajo Doremi #: The Movie (映画おジャ魔女どれみ#, Eiga Ojamajo Doremi Shāpu) was the first theatrical release for the series and was directed by Takuya Igarashi. Roughly twenty-seven minutes long, it was released on July 8, 2000 (along with Digimon Hurricane Touchdown!! / Supreme Evolution!! The Golden Digimentals), for the 2000 Summer Toei Anime Fair. The Digimon movie was split into two parts and Ojamajo Doremi #: The Movie was screened in between.

In the movie, Pop has just passed one of her witch exams, but gets into a heated argument with Doremi because Hana followed her into the Witch World. Initially unbeknownst to everyone, the flower Pop brought home from the Witch World is really the Witch Queen Heart, the Queen's favorite flower, which grants any wish it hears regardless of any possible dangers until it begins to bear seeds. One of the wishes it had granted involves turning Doremi into a mouse, unknowingly made by Pop over her anger towards Doremi. While Pop goes to search for her sister, the other girls track down the runaway flower before it starts to reproduce.

==== The Secret of the Frog Stone ====
Mōtto! Ojamajo Doremi: The Secret of the Frog Stone (も～っと!おジャ魔女どれみ: カエル石のひみつ, Mōtto! Ojamajo Doremi: Kaeru Ishi no Himitsu) was the series' second theatrical release. It was directed by Shigeyasu Yamauchi and hit theaters on July 14, 2001, screened between Digimon Tamers: Battle of Adventurers and Kinnikuman: Second Generations.

During Doremi and her friends' summer vacation, they visit her grandparents in the fictional mountains of Fukuyama, where they hear of a mysterious legend of Mayuri and Zenjuro, two star-crossed lovers that died in the Edo period. During the next morning, when they investigate the forest, the girls get lost and face the Curse of the Full Moon, which makes them unable to use magic. Meanwhile, due to a traumatizing memory, Aiko develops a fear of Doremi's grandfather.

==== Looking for Magical Doremi ====
Looking for Magical Doremi (魔女見習いをさがして, Majo Minarai o Sagashite) is a 2020 anime film released for the franchise's 20th anniversary. The film focuses on three adults, Sora Nagase, Mire Yoshigaki, and Reika Kawatani, who watched Ojamajo Doremi when they were children. Staff members who worked on the original anime series will be returning to the project, including Junichi Sato and Haruka Kamatani as directors, Takashi Yamada (under his pen name Midori Kuriyama) as screenwriter, and Yoshihiko Umakoshi as the character designer. The voice actresses from the original series will reprise their roles. Three new characters were revealed on October 29, 2019, at the Tokyo International Film Festival, as well as returning staff members art designer Kenichi Tajiri and color artist Kunio Tsujita. The film was originally scheduled to be released in theaters on May 15, 2020, but it was postponed due to the COVID-19 pandemic. It was released nationwide on November 13, 2020.

=== Music ===
Throughout the run of the series, multiple singles, albums, and compilations were distributed. The original series' CDs were released under Bandai Music Entertainment, while music from Ojamajo Doremi # was distributed by King Records. From Mōtto! Ojamajo Doremi onwards, the CDs were distributed by Marvelous Entertainment.

=== Light novel ===
On September 5, 2011, Kodansha Limited announced the coming of the light novel Ojamajo Doremi 16, featuring the original work of Izumi Todo, story written by Takashi Yamada (under his pen name Midori Kuriyama), and illustrations by Yoshihiko Umakoshi. It was published in three volumes by Kodansha between December 2, 2011, and November 30, 2012. The story takes place several years after the events of the anime series, with the main characters now in high school. It was followed by a second series, Ojamajo Doremi 17, released in three volumes between July 2, 2013, and February 28, 2014, and a third, Ojamajo Doremi 18, released in two volumes between September 2, 2014, and June 2, 2015. The final volume, Ojamajo Doremi 19, was released on December 9, 2015. Drama CDs were included with the first Ojamajo Doremi 17 novel, the third Ojamajo Doremi 17 novel, and Ojamajo Doremi 19. Toei producer Hiromi Seki has expressed interest in producing an anime adaptation of the series, but stated it would depend on sales. Following the announcement of the new movie, a new light novel volume, Ojamajo Doremi 20’s, was announced for release in summer 2019, but it was delayed to October 2, 2019. Yumi Kageyama replaced Takashi Yamada as author for this installment.

No.	Title	Japanese release date	Japanese ISBN
1	Ojamajo Doremi 16 おジャ魔女どれみ16	December 2, 2011	978-4-06-3752069
2	Ojamajo Doremi 16: Naive おジャ魔女どれみ16 Naive	May 2, 2012	978-4-06-375235-9
3	Ojamajo Doremi 16: Turning Point おジャ魔女どれみ16 TURNING POINT	November 30, 2012	978-4-06-375273-1
4	Ojamajo Doremi 17 おジャ魔女どれみ17	July 2, 2013	978-4-06-375287-8
5	Ojamajo Doremi 17 2nd: Kizashi おジャ魔女どれみ17 2nd 〜KIZASHI〜	October 2, 2013	978-4-06-375327-1
6	Ojamajo Doremi 17 3rd: Come On! おジャ魔女どれみ17 3rd 〜COME ON!〜	February 28, 2014	978-4-06-375347-9
7	Ojamajo Doremi 18 おジャ魔女どれみ18	September 2, 2014	978-4-06-375371-4
8	Ojamajo Doremi 18 2nd: Spring has... おジャ魔女どれみ18 2nd Spring has...	June 2, 2015	978-4-06-3814255
9	Ojamajo Doremi 19 おジャ魔女どれみ19	December 2, 2015	978-4-06-3587791
10	Ojamajo Doremi 20’s おジャ魔女どれみ20’s	October 2, 2019	978-4-06-5162347

=== Stage plays ===
During the run of Ojamajo Doremi Dokkān!, Toei hosted live events with dance performances by select actresses who portrayed the girls, titled "Ojamajo Kids". The cast consisted of Kasumi Suzuki as Doremi, Tsugumi Shinohara as Hana, Miiya Tanaka as Hazuki, Chiharu Watanabe as Aiko, Makoto Takeda as Onpu, and Chisato Maeda as Momoko.

A stage play adaptation of Ojamajo Doremi Dokkān! was produced by Nelke Planning and starred the Japanese girl group ≠Me, with the characters double-cast and split between two groups: Cologne Team and Jewelry Team. The stage play ran in theaters from May 15 to May 22, 2022.

=== Video games ===
The franchise received few video games, most of them are educational games for children.

==== Sega Pico series ====
Three games has been released for the Sega Pico, containing several minigames for children:

- Ojamajo Doremi Sharp (circa 2000)
- Mo-tto! Ojamajo Doremi (circa 2001)
- Ojamajo Doremi Dokkan! (circa 2002)

==== PlayStation games ====
Four games has been released for the Sony PlayStation, three of them part of the KidsStation educational line-up:

- Ojamajo Doremi Sharp Maho-dou Dance Carnival! (September 21, 2000), a musical game similar to Dance Dance Revolution mechanics.
- Mo-tto! Ojamajo Doremi: Maho-dou Smile Party (July 26, 2001), composed with minigames and activities.
- Ojamajo Doremi Dokkan: Maho-dou Eigo Festival (March 20, 2002), the third KidsStation line-up release for this series. It is a software for teaching English.
- Ojamajo Doremi Dokkan: Nijiiro Paradise (November 28, 2002), a party video game based on board and dice.

==== Other platforms ====
- Ojamajo Adventure: Naisho no Mahou (November 19, 2004), a visual novel for PC, featuring the exclusive character Majorythm.
- Puyo Puyo!! Quest brought the Ojamajo Doremi 20th Anniversary collaboration event, featuring Doremi, Hazuki, Aiko, Onpu, and Momoko in their Ojamajo outfits from the first season and with their original voice actors as playable characters, and the recurring characters Amitie, Spica, Sonia, Tilura, and Kirin, also playable, and available in Ojamajo outfits, along with Majorika and other non-playable characters themed around the franchise. The event ran from November 15 to 25, 2019, and the characters obtained are permanently available.
- Magical DoReMi: Puzzle Carnival, an as-a-service free-to-play match-three puzzle game (a Bejeweled clone) for mobile devices, developed by Taiwanese developer HappyTuk, starred by "Player's avatar", a girl without a predefined name, whom the player can customize, including giving her a name. It featured a progression-based story mode that recounted select events from the first season of the anime series. New outfits and other customizations could be obtained by progressing through the game, as well as by upgrading the magic shop. It was released on June 27, 2023, and, due to the lack of popularity, on May 14, 2025 has been announced its closing. closing its servers on June 18, 2025 and the official website on July 4, 2025, along with its removal from the Google Play and App Store stores, making it completely unplayable.

== Merchandise ==
Bandai produced a toy line for Ojamajo Doremi. Maki Takahashi served as the toy line's supervisor, and a character was named after her in the show as an homage. In 2000, Bandai originally planned to market Ojamajo Doremi in North America through a partnership with Mattel, but the toy line was dropped. After 4Kids Entertainment picked up the series for North American distribution, they signed a marketing deal with Bandai America in August 2005 to distribute a toy line beginning in Q2 2006.

Beginning 2015, Premium Bandai produced limited edition goods and a make-up line for the franchise's 15th anniversary, targeted towards women. In the following years, Ojamajo Doremi has also collaborated with other fashion and character brands including SuperGroupies, The Ichi, Liz Lisa, Favorite, The Kiss, Ichiban Kuji, Sanrio, and Earth Music & Ecology.

== Reception ==
Bandai reported Ojamajo Doremi merchandise grossed a total of ¥5 billion by 2000. By the time the third season was broadcast, the viewership rating was 13.7% and 90% of the target demographic were watching the show. During Ojamajo Doremi’s first television season in Japan, the merchandise grossed over $100 million.

== Legacy ==
The mobile puzzle game Puyopuyo!! Quest presented a Ojamajo Doremi collaboration event between November 15 and 25, 2019. As part of the event, Doremi, Hazuki, Aiko, Onpu, and Momoko with the first season outfit were made available as playable characters – with the original voice cast reprising their roles from the series. Majorika – as well as the recurring characters Amitie, Spica, Sonia, Tilura and Kirin with the Ojamajo outfit, also were made playable. A bonus of Doremi in her regular clothing was also made available to accounts who logged in to the game for the first time.

In October 2020, Ojamajo Doremi partnered with the Bushiroad mobile game BanG Dream! Girls Band Party! to promote Looking for Magical Doremi. As part of the collaboration, the BanG Dream! band Hello, Happy World! received in-game costumes based on the main characters of Ojamajo Doremi and performed a cover version of the first season's opening theme.
