= Ojamajo Doremi Dokkān! =

- No. of episodes: 51

Release
- Original network: TV Asahi
- Original release: February 3, 2002 – January 26, 2003

Series chronology
- ← Previous; Mōtto! Ojamajo Doremi Next → Ojamajo Doremi Na-i-sho

Ojamajo Doremi Dokkān! (おジャ魔女どれみドッカ～ン！, Ojamajo Doremi Dokkān!) is the fourth and final season of Ojamajo Doremi. The series was directed by Takuya Igarashi and produced by Toei Animation. It was broadcast on TV Asahi from February 3, 2002, to January 26, 2003, and lasted 51 episodes. The series deals with the sudden growth of Hana, who has aged herself voluntarily and is given permission to become a witch apprentice. At the same time, the former witch queen's curse has gone into full bloom, but the curse can be stopped if Doremi and the girls can remind her of her fondest memories, which involve the tedious task of recreating the gifts she made and received from her grandchildren.

Aside from using soundtracks from the previous series, the opening theme song for Ojamajo Doremi Dokkān! is "Dance! Ojamajo" (DANCE! おジャ魔女) by Maho-Dou. The first ending theme song was titled "Watashi no Tsubasa" (わたしのつばさ; My Wings), performed by Masami Nakatsukasa. The second ending theme song was "Ojamajo Ondo de Happy-py!!" (おジャ魔女音頭でハッピッピ!!, Ojamajo Ondo de Happippi!!) by Maho-Dou and was only featured in the episodes that were airing throughout summer. By episode 31, the ending song switched back to "Watashi no Tsubasa" for the remainder of the show. The final episode features a special all-cast version of "Watashi no Tsubasa" and was performed by the voice cast.

This season ranked #15 on the 26th annual readers' poll in the June 2004 issue of Animage.

== Episode list ==
No. overall	No. in season	Title	Original release date
151	1	"Doremi's Surprise! A New Ojamajo"; Transliteration: "Doremi Bikkuri! Atarashi no Ojamajo" (Japanese: どれみびっくり!新しいおジャ魔女)	February 3, 2002
152	2	"Hana Becomes a Sixth Grade Student!"; Transliteration: "Hana-chan Roku Nensei ni Naru!" (Japanese: ハナちゃん6年生になる!)	February 10, 2002
153	3	"Hana Will Not Give Up!"; Transliteration: "Hana-chan ni wa Makerarenai!" (Japanese: ハナちゃんには負けられない!)	February 17, 2002
154	4	"Maho-Dou Goes Bankrupt!?"; Transliteration: "Maho-Dou ga Tsuburechau!?" (Japanese: MAHO堂がつぶれちゃう!?)	February 24, 2002
155	5	"Onpu's Unpainted Face"; Transliteration: "Sugao no Onpu" (Japanese: 素顔のおんぷ)	March 3, 2002
156	6	"The Class Library's Combination is Missing!?"; Transliteration: "Gakkyuu Bunko no Mei Konbi!?" (Japanese: 学級文庫の迷コンビ!?)	March 10, 2002
157	7	"Open! Door of the Heart"; Transliteration: "Hiraite! Kokoro no Tobira" (Japanese: 開いて!心のとびら)	March 17, 2002
158	8	"Found Out!? Hana's Secret"; Transliteration: "Barechatta!? Hana-chan no Himitsu" (Japanese: ばれちゃった!?ハナちゃんのひみつ)	March 24, 2002
159	9	"Hazuki's Shining Star"; Transliteration: "Hazuki no Kira-kira Boshi" (Japanese: はづきのキラキラ星)	March 31, 2002
160	10	"Field Trip!! Being a Leader is Hard"; Transliteration: "Shuugakuryokou!! Hanchou ha Tsurai yo" (Japanese: 修学旅行!!班長はツラいよ)	April 7, 2002
161	11	"Nara! A Fated Meeting"; Transliteration: "Nara! Unmei no Saikai" (Japanese: 奈良!運命の再会)	April 14, 2002
162	12	"Kyoto! Never-Ending Night"; Transliteration: "Kyoto! Owaranai Yoru" (Japanese: 京都!終わらない夜)	April 21, 2002
163	13	"Mutsumi's Retirement Announcement!"; Transliteration: "Mutsumi no Intai Sengen!" (Japanese: むつみの引退宣言!)	April 28, 2002
164	14	"Laziness is the Greatest Enemy! Level 7 Exam"; Transliteration: "Yudantaiteki! Nana Kyuu Shiken" (Japanese: 油断大敵!7級試験)	May 5, 2002
165	15	"Mother's Obstinacy"; Transliteration: "Okaasan no Wakarazuya" (Japanese: お母さんのわからずや)	May 12, 2002
166	16	"How to Make a Rainbow That Doesn't Disappear"; Transliteration: "Kienai Niji no Tsukurikata" (Japanese: 消えない虹の作り方)	May 19, 2002
167	17	"Protect the Secret Base!"; Transliteration: "Himitsu Kichi wo Mamore!" (Japanese: 秘密基地を守れ!)	May 26, 2002
168	18	"Sweetheart's Whereabouts are Woof, Woof, Woof"; Transliteration: "Koi no Yukue wa Wanwanwan" (Japanese: 恋の行方はワンワンワン)	June 2, 2002
169	19	"Father Cannot Be Honest!?"; Transliteration: "Otousan wa Sunao ni Narenai!?" (Japanese: お父さんは素直になれない!?)	June 9, 2002
170	20	"The Search for Momoko's Dream"; Transliteration: "Momoko no Yume Sagashi" (Japanese: ももこの夢探し)	June 16, 2002
171	21	"I Love You! Oyajide"; Transliteration: "Daisuki! Oyajiide" (Japanese: 大好き!オヤジーデ)	June 23, 2002
172	22	"Don't Go, Kimitaka!!"; Transliteration: "Kimitaka Ikanaide!!" (Japanese: きみたか行かないで!!)	June 30, 2002
173	23	"Tanabata Somehow Stopped!"; Transliteration: "Tanabata Nante Yaameta!" (Japanese: 七夕なんてやーめた!)	July 7, 2002
174	24	"With Love and Justice! We Are Majo Ranger!"; Transliteration: "Ai yo Seigi yo! Watashitachi Majo Ranger!" (Japanese: 愛よ正義よ!私たちマジョレンジャー!)	July 14, 2002
175	25	"Will You Smile? The Mysterious Glass"; Transliteration: "Egao wo Kureru? Nazo no Glass" (Japanese: 笑顔をくれる?謎のグラス)	July 21, 2002
176	26	"Camp and Curry are Hot, Hot, Hot!?"; Transliteration: "Camp to Curry de Acchicchi!?" (Japanese: キャンプとカレーでアッチッチ!?)	July 28, 2002
177	27	"White Elephant, Nice to Meet You!"; Transliteration: "Shiroi Zou-san, Hajimemashite!" (Japanese: 白いゾウさん、はじめまして!)	August 4, 2002
178	28	"We Can't Compete Against Grandmas!?"; Transliteration: "Obaachan Zuni wa Kanawanai!?" (Japanese: おばあちゃんズにはかなわない!?)	August 11, 2002
179	29	"Don't Let Go! Hand in Hand"; Transliteration: "Hanasanaide! Tsunaide Te to Te" (Japanese: はなさないで!つないだ手と手)	August 18, 2002
180	30	"Suspicious Shadow!? The Chest of the Witch World"; Transliteration: "Ayashii Kage!? Majo-kai no Mune Sawagi" (Japanese: あやしい影!?魔女界の胸さわぎ)	August 25, 2002
181	31	"Pao is a Bothersome Elephant!?"; Transliteration: "Pao-chan wa Ojama Zou!?" (Japanese: パオちゃんはおジャ魔ゾウ!?)	September 1, 2002
182	32	"Even a Good Child Worries"; Transliteration: "Iiko Datte Nounderu" (Japanese: いい子だって悩んでる)	September 8, 2002
183	33	"Lost Onpu"; Transliteration: "Mayoeru Onpu" (Japanese: 迷えるおんぷ)	September 15, 2002
184	34	"Baba and Forever"; Transliteration: "Baba to Itsumademo" (Japanese: ババといつまでも)	September 22, 2002
185	35	"Level 4 exam is Lo, Lo, Lo, Lo?"; Transliteration: "Yon Kyuu Shiken wa no Rorororo?" (Japanese: 4級試験はのろろろろ〜?)	September 29, 2002
186	36	"The Bicycle That Goes Anywhere"; Transliteration: "Jidensha de Doko made mo" (Japanese: 自転車でどこまでも)	October 6, 2002
187	37	"Disarray!? Sleeping Wizards"; Transliteration: "Zenmetsu!? Nemureru Mahoutsukai-tachi" (Japanese: 全滅!?眠れる魔法使いたち)	October 13, 2002
188	38	"Finally a Second Marriage!? Aiko's Decision"; Transliteration: "Tsui ni Saikon!? Aiko no Ketsui" (Japanese: ついに再婚!?あいこの決意)	October 20, 2002
189	39	"Wholeheartedly! A Happy White Rose"; Transliteration: "Kokoro wo Komete! Sachise no Shiroi Bara" (Japanese: 心をこめて!幸せの白いバラ)	October 27, 2002
190	40	"Doremi and the Witch That Stopped Being a Witch"; Transliteration: "Doremi to Majo wo Yameta Majo" (Japanese: どれみと魔女をやめた魔女)	November 10, 2002
191	41	"Pop Becomes a Witch Early On!?"; Transliteration: "Poppu ga Saki ni Majo ni Naru!?" (Japanese: ぽっぷが先に魔女になる!?)	November 17, 2002
192	42	"I Have to Decide!? Hazuki's Road"; Transliteration: "Jibun de Kimeru!? Hazuki no Michi" (Japanese: 自分で決める!?はづきの道)	November 24, 2002
193	43	"Level 1 Exam! Tamaki's Desperate Situation!!"; Transliteration: "Ichi Kyuu Shiken! Tamaki Zettai Zetsumei!!" (Japanese: 1級試験!玉木絶対絶命!!)	December 1, 2002
194	44	"Hurry, Urgent! Final Clue!"; Transliteration: "Isoganakya! Saigo no Tegakari" (Japanese: 急がなきゃ!最後の手がかり)	December 8, 2002
195	45	"Brambles of Sorrow, Disappear!"; Transliteration: "Kanashimi no Ibara yo, Kiete!" (Japanese: 悲しみのイバラよ、消えて!)	December 15, 2002
196	46	"Farewell, Curse of the Witch-Frogs!"; Transliteration: "Saraba, Majo-Gaeru no Noroi" (Japanese: さらば、魔女ガエルの呪い)	December 22, 2002
197	47	"Even If You Go Far Away"; Transliteration: "Tatoe Tooku Hanaretemo" (Japanese: たとえ遠くはなれても)	December 29, 2002
198	48	"Aiko's Number One Happy Day"; Transliteration: "Aiko no Ichiban Shiawase na Hi" (Japanese: あいこのいちばん幸せな日)	January 5, 2003
199	49	"Forever Forever, Friends"; Transliteration: "Zutto Zutto, Friends" (Japanese: ずっとずっと、フレンズ)	January 12, 2003
200	50	"Goodbye, Ojamajo"; Transliteration: "Sayonara, Ojamajo" (Japanese: さよなら、おジャ魔女)	January 19, 2003
201	51	"Thank You! Until We Meet Again"; Transliteration: "Arigatou! Mata Au Hi made" (Japanese: ありがとう!また会う日まで)	January 26, 2003
