= Mōtto! Ojamajo Doremi =

- No. of episodes: 50

Release
- Original network: TV Asahi
- Original release: February 4, 2001 – January 27, 2002

Season chronology
- ← Previous; Ojamajo Doremi Sharp Next → Ojamajo Doremi Dokkān!

Mōtto! Ojamajo Doremi (も～っと! おジャ魔女どれみ) is the third season of Ojamajo Doremi. The series was directed by Takuya Igarashi and produced by Toei Animation. It is a direct sequel to the previous series, Ojamajo Doremi Sharp and was broadcast on TV Asahi from February 4, 2001, to January 27, 2002, and lasted 50 episodes. In this series, Doremi and the girls are given the task to earn their witch apprenticeship back by making pastries for the Witch Senate. They are joined by a new witch apprentice, Momoko Asuka, who teaches them how to make the sweets, as they, in return, help her adjust to Japan after her move from New York.

Throughout the run of this series, two traffic safety videos were released as well as a 30-minute theatrical film directed by Shigeyasu Yamauchi, titled Motto! Ojamajo Doremi: The Secret of the Frog Stone (も～っと!おジャ魔女どれみ: カエル石のひみつ, Mōtto! Ojamajo Doremi: Kaeru Ishi no Himitsu).

The opening theme song for Motto! Ojamajo Doremi was "Ojamajo de BAN" (おジャ魔女でBAN, Ojamajo de Ban) by MAHO-Do. The ending theme song was "Treasure" (たからもの, Takaramono), performed by Yui Komuro.

Toei Animation's English website lists the TV series name as Magical Doremi 3 and the movie name as Magical DoReMi 3: The Secret of the Frog Stone.

== Episode list ==
No. overall	No. in season	Title	Original release date
101	1	"Doremi's Stormy New School Year"; Transliteration: "Doremi, Arashi no Shingakki!" (Japanese: どれみ、嵐の新学期!)	February 4, 2001
102	2	"Momoko Cries!? Secret of the Earring"; Transliteration: "Momoko ga Naita!? Pierce no Himitsu" (Japanese: ももこが泣いた!?ピアスの秘密)	February 11, 2001
103	3	"I Hate You! But I Would Like to Become Friends"; Transliteration: "Dai Kirai! Demo Tomodachi ni Naritai!" (Japanese: 大キライ!でも友だちになりたい!)	February 18, 2001
104	4	"Welcome to the Sweet House!"; Transliteration: "Youkoso, Sweet House He!" (Japanese: ようこそ、スウィートハウスへ!)	February 25, 2001
105	5	"The SOS Trio Break Up!?"; Transliteration: "SOS Trio ga Kaisan!?" (Japanese: SOSトリオが解散!?)	March 4, 2001
106	6	"Challenge! The First Patissier Exam"; Transliteration: "Chousen! Hajimete no Patissier Shiken" (Japanese: 挑戦!初めてのパティシエ服)	March 11, 2001
107	7	"Welcome Home! Hana"; Transliteration: "Okaeri! Hana-chan" (Japanese: おかえり!ハナちゃん)	March 18, 2001
108	8	"What Is A Close Friend?"; Transliteration: "Shinyu-tte, Nani?" (Japanese: 親友って、なーに?)	March 25, 2001
109	9	"Hazuki and Masaru's Treasure"; Transliteration: "Hazuki to Masaru no Takaramono" (Japanese: はづきとまさるのたからもの)	April 1, 2001
110	10	"We Don't Want to Become Adults!"; Transliteration: "Otona ni Nante Naritakunai!" (Japanese: おとなになんてなりたくない!)	April 8, 2001
111	11	"The Teacher Doesn't Stop!!"; Transliteration: "Sensei ga Tomaranai!" (Japanese: 先生が止まらない!!)	April 15, 2001
112	12	"Kotake vs. Demon Coach Igarashi"; Transliteration: "Kotake VS Oni Coach Igarashi" (Japanese: 小竹VS鬼コーチ五十嵐)	April 22, 2001
113	13	"The Dream Boat That You Want!"; Transliteration: "Yume no Fune ni Noritai!" (Japanese: 夢の船にのりたい!)	April 29, 2001
114	14	"A Messed Up Happy Birthday"; Transliteration: "Harann no Happy Birthday" (Japanese: 波乱のハッピーバースデー)	May 6, 2001
115	15	"Do You Love Pretty Mothers Or Not?"; Transliteration: "Kirei na Okaasan wa Suki? Kirai?" (Japanese: きれいなお母さんはスキ?キライ?)	May 13, 2001
116	16	"Isn't It Enough to be Tasty!?"; Transliteration: "Oishii Dakeja, Dame!?" (Japanese: おいしいだけじゃ、ダメ!?)	May 20, 2001
117	17	"Fatal Rivals! Harukaze and Tamaki"; Transliteration: "Innen no Rival! Harukaze to Tamaki" (Japanese: 因縁のライバル!!春風と玉木)	May 27, 2001
118	18	"Glued To!! A Child Idol's Day"; Transliteration: "Micchaku! Chaidoru no Ichinichi" (Japanese: 密着!!チャイドルの一日)	June 3, 2001
119	19	"Similar Parent and Child, Always Quarreling"; Transliteration: "Kenka Bakkari Nitamono Oyako" (Japanese: ケンカばっかり似たもの親子)	June 10, 2001
120	20	"The Classmate I Met For the First Time"; Transliteration: "Hajimete Au Classmate" (Japanese: はじめて会うクラスメイト)	June 24, 2001
121	21	"Out Of Magic Powder!!"; Transliteration: "Mahou no Moto ga Naku Nachau!!" (Japanese: まほうのもとがなくなっちゃう!!)	July 1, 2001
122	22	"Pop is a Big Sister??"; Transliteration: "Poppu ga Oneechan??" (Japanese: ぽっぷがお姉ちゃん??)	July 8, 2001
123	23	"Clam of the Shore"; Transliteration: "Nagisa no Hamaguri" (Japanese: なぎさのハマグリ)	July 15, 2001
124	24	"Rock 'N' Roll in the Music Club!?"; Transliteration: "Ongaku Club de Rock 'N' Roll!?" (Japanese: 音楽クラブでロックンロール!?)	July 22, 2001
125	25	"A Lonely Summer Vacation"; Transliteration: "Hitoribocchi no Natsuyasumi" (Japanese: ひとりぼっちの夏休み)	July 29, 2001
126	26	"Let Fly Your Feelings! Aiko, to Osaka!"; Transliteration: "Omoi yo Todoke! Aiko Osaka-e" (Japanese: 想いよとどけ!あいこ大阪へ)	August 5, 2001
127	27	"Going Through a Nasty Exam!"; Transliteration: "Ijiwaru shiken wo Kiri Nukero!" (Japanese: いじわる試験を切りぬけろ!)	August 12, 2001
128	28	"Witch Kindergarten, In the Nick of Time!"; Transliteration: "Majo Youchien, Kikiippatsu!" (Japanese: 魔女幼稚園、危機いっぱつ!)	August 19, 2001
129	29	"Terror! The Curse of the Water Well Ghost"; Transliteration: "Kyoufu! Ido Yuurei no Noroi" (Japanese: 恐怖!井戸ユウレイの呪い)	August 26, 2001
130	30	"Please Give Us the Illusionary Recipe!"; Transliteration: "Maboroshi no Recipe wo Kudasai!" (Japanese: まぼろしのレシピをください!)	September 2, 2001
131	31	"I'll Fix It! Vegetable Distaste"; Transliteration: "Naoshite Misemasu! Yasai Girai" (Japanese: なおしてみせます!野菜ギライ)	September 9, 2001
132	32	"Momoko's Mother Training"; Transliteration: "Momoko no Mama Shugyou" (Japanese: ももこのママ修行)	September 16, 2001
133	33	"Unrivaled!? Ojamajo's Assistance In Battle"; Transliteration: "Tenka Muteki!? Ojamajo na Sukedachi" (Japanese: 天下無敵!?おジャ魔女な助太刀)	September 23, 2001
134	34	"Revive! The Legendary Sweet"; Transliteration: "Yomigaere! Densetsu no Okashi" (Japanese: よみがえれ!伝説のお菓子)	September 30, 2001
135	35	"Tamaki, Taking On The Rule!?"; Transliteration: "Tamaki, Tenka-o Toru!?" (Japanese: 玉木、天下をとる!?)	October 7, 2001
136	36	"Hazuki's Delicious Idea"; Transliteration: "Hazuki no Oishii Idea" (Japanese: はづきのおいしいアイデア)	October 14, 2001
137	37	"Fairies Want To Rest Too!!"; Transliteration: "Yousei Datte Yasumitai!!" (Japanese: 妖精だって休みたい!!)	October 21, 2001
138	38	"I Want To Go To School!"; Transliteration: "Gakkou ni Ikitai!" (Japanese: 学校に行きたい!)	October 28, 2001
139	39	"School Arts Festival! Who's the Lead Part?"; Transliteration: "Gakugeikai! Shuyaku wa Daare?" (Japanese: 学芸会!主役はだーれ?)	November 11, 2001
140	40	"Hana, Digging for Potatoes!"; Transliteration: "Hana-chan, Imo wo Horu!" (Japanese: ハナちゃん、イモを掘る!)	November 18, 2001
141	41	"Revitalization of the Witch-Frogs' Village"; Transliteration: "Majo-gaeru no Mura Okoshi" (Japanese: 魔女ガエルの村おこし)	November 25, 2001
142	42	"Heart-Pounding! The Twins' Mysterious Magic"; Transliteration: "Dokidoki! Futago no Fushigi na Mahou" (Japanese: ドキドキ!ふたごの不思議なまほう)	December 2, 2001
143	43	"The Ojamajo Cross the Sea"; Transliteration: "Ojamajo wa Umi wo Koete" (Japanese: おジャ魔女は海を越えて)	December 9, 2001
144	44	"Ai-chan Goes Home!?"; Transliteration: "Ai-chan ga Kaecchau!?" (Japanese: あいちゃんが帰っちゃう!?)	December 16, 2001
145	45	"Merry Christmas, Everyone!"; Transliteration: "Minna de! Merry Christmas" (Japanese: みんなで!メリークリスマス)	December 23, 2001
146	46	"The Nonsensical Magical New Year's Party"; Transliteration: "Hachamecha Mahou Bounenkai" (Japanese: ハチャメチャ魔法忘年会)	December 30, 2001
147	47	"Hana's Great Adventure"; Transliteration: "Hana-chan no Dai Bouken" (Japanese: ハナちゃんの大冒険)	January 6, 2002
148	48	"Zero Clues! The Final Exam"; Transliteration: "Tegakari Zero! Saigo no Shiken" (Japanese: 手がかりゼロ!最後の試験)	January 13, 2002
149	49	"Open Your Eyes! Manipulated Momoko"; Transliteration: "Me wo Samashite! Ayatsurareta Momoko" (Japanese: 目をさまして!あやつられたももこ)	January 20, 2002
150	50	"Good Bye, Witch Apprentices"; Transliteration: "Sayonara Majo Minarai" (Japanese: さよなら魔女見習)	January 27, 2002
