= Ojamajo Doremi discography =

This is a list of the dozens of Ojamajo Doremi CD releases in Japan.

== Ojamajo Doremi ==
=== Ojamajo Carnival!! ===
Ojamajo Carnival!! was the first single released for Ojamajo Doremi by MAHO-Dou (MAHO堂), a group made especially for Ojamajo Doremi. It was produced by Bandai Music Entertainment and released on 5 March 1999. During the first season, it consisted of Chiemi Chiba, Tomoko Akiya, and Yuki Matsuoka, voices of Doremi Harukaze, Hazuki Fujiwara, and Aiko Senoo, respectively. The single contains the full versions of both the opening and ending songs, along with karaoke versions. The single won the AM Kobe Award in 1999 for Best Theme Song.

Staff

- Artists: MAHO-Dou [1]; Saeko Shuu [2]
- Composers: Takeshi Ike [1,3]; Banchō Mehara (芽原万超) [2,4]
- Arrangers: Masahiro Kawasaki [2,4]; Masayuki Sakamoto [1,3]
- Lyricist: Sachiko Oomori (大森祥子)

Tracks

Ojamajo Carnival
No.	Title	Lyrics	Music	Length
1.	"Ojamajo Carnival!!" (おジャ魔女カーニバル！！)	Shoko Omori	MAHO-Dou	3:36
2.	"Kitto Ashita wa (Certainly Tomorrow)" (きっと明日は)	Shoko Omori	Saeko Shuu	3:33
3.	"'Ojamajo Carnival!! (Original Karaoke)" (おジャ魔女カーニバル！！（オリジナルカラオケ）)			3:36
4.	"Kitto Ashita wa (Original Karaoke)" (きっと明日は（オリジナルカラオケ）)			3:33

=== Ojamajo CD Club Vol. 1: Ojamajo Vocal Collection ===
This CD was produced by Bandai Music Entertainment and released on 21 April 1999. It includes vocalized songs from the show with small talk segments featuring the main characters excitedly talking about the CD.

Staff

- Artists: Mayumi Gojou [3,8,11]; MAHO-Dou [2,7,13]; Yuki Matsuura [4]; Chihiro Sakurai (Dela) [5]; Za Shibatagorō [10]; Naoko Matsudaira (松平直子) [9]
- Composers: Takeshi Ike [2]; Miki Matsubara [3,5,8]; Yuki Matsuura [4]; Masayuki Sakamoto [11]; Choku Asada (浅田直) [7,10,13]; Shin Abe (阿部真) [9]; Banchu Mehara (芽原万超) [14]
- Arrangers: Masahiro Kawasaki [14]; Yuki Matsuura [4]; MT-Drive [8,10]; Masayuki Sakamoto [2,3,7,11,13], Tatsuni Yano [5]; Kazuo Nobuta [9]
- Lyricists: Minako Aoyagi [10]; Miki Matsubara [8]; Yuki Matsuura [4]; Sachiko Oomori (大森祥子) [2,7,9,14]; Misuke Yunoki (柚木美祐) [3,5,11,13]

Cast

- Hazuki Fujiwara (Tomoko Akiya 秋谷智子)
- Doremi Harukaze (Chiemi Chiba 千葉千恵巳)
- Aiko Senoo (Yuki Matsuoka 松岡由貴)

Tracks

1. Ojamajo Talk Sono 1 (おジャ魔女トーク その1 Ojamajo Talk Part 1)
2. Ojamajo Carnival!! (おジャ魔女カーニバル！！)
3. Pirikapiri♥Lucky! (ピリカピリ♥ラッキー!)
4. Dokidoki no Mahou (ドキドキの魔法 Heart-Beating Magic)
5. Dela's Song (デラ's Song)
6. Ojamajo Talk Sono 2 (おジャ魔女トーク その2 Ojamajo Talk Part 2)
7. Nichiyoubi wa Mahou no Ko (日曜日は魔法のコ Sunday is Magic's Child)
8. Mahō de Choi^{2} (魔法でチョイ^{2} Effortless Magic)
9. Kotori no Kimochi (小鳥の気持ち The Small Bird's Feelings)
10. Gokigen Yoroshiku!! (ゴキゲンよろしく！！ Nice to Meet You!!)
11. Juubyou Kazoete (10秒かぞえて Count 10 Seconds)
12. Ojamajo Talk Sono 3 (おジャ魔女トーク その3 Ojamajo Talk Part 3)
13. Onnanoko wa Benkyoujuu! (女の子は勉強中！ The Girl is Studying!)
14. Kitto Ashita wa (きっと明日は Certainly Tomorrow)

=== Ojamajo CD Club Vol. 2: Ojamajo BGM Collection ===
This CD was originally produced by Bandai Music Entertainment and released on 21 July 1999. It was produced by Sony Music Japan and distributed again by wint on 6 July 2005 as a limited press edition, with only 5,000 copies for sale. The CD contains a selection of background music used for the show, all composed and arranged by Keiichi Oku.

Staff

- Artists: MAHO-Dou [1]; Saeko Shuu [17]
- Composers: Takeshi Ike [1]; Keiichi Oku [2-16]; Banchou Mehara (芽原万超) [17]
- Arrangers: Masahiro Kawasaki [17]; Keiichi Oku [2-16]; Masayuki Sakamoto [1]
- Lyricist: Sachiko Oomori (大森祥子) [1,17]

Tracks

1. Opening 「Ojamajo Carnival!!」 (TV Size) (オープニング「おジャ魔女カーニバル！！」（TVサイズ）)
2. Kyou mo Genki ni Ittemiyo! (今日も元気にいってみよ！ Let's Be Cheerful Again Today!)
3. Pretty Witch Doremi-chi (プリチー・ウィッチ・どれみっち)
4. Ojama ni Daikatsuyaku! (おジャ魔に大活躍！ Ojama Stellar Performance!)
5. Pretty Witch Hazuki-chi (プリチー・ウィッチ・はづきっち)
6. Suteki na MAHO-Dou (ステキなMAHO堂 Wonderful MAHO-Dou)
7. Pretty Witch Aiko-chi (プリチー・ウィッチ・あいこっち)
8. Sannen Nikumi no Nakamatachi (3年2組の仲間たち Friends of Class 3–2)
9. Ayashii Yokan (あやしい予感 Strange Premonition)
10. Wakuwaku Kokishi Dokidoki Daiboken (ワクワク好奇心 ドキドキ大冒険 Excited Curiosity, Heart-Racing Adventure)
11. Sasai na Kuchigenka (ささいな口ゲンカ Trivial Argument)
12. Yumemiru Onnanoko (夢みる女の子 Dreaming Girl)
13. Sekai Ichi Fuko na Bishōjo? (世界いち不幸な美少女？ The World's Unluckiest Beautiful Girl?)
14. Shinpi no Majokai (神秘の魔女界 Mysterious Witch World)
15. Chikara wo Awasete! (力をあわせて！ Gather Our Powers!)
16. Happy Lucky Minna ni To~doke! (ハッピー ラッキー みんなにと～どけ I Wish Happiness and Lucky to Everyone)
17. Ending 「Kitto Ashita wa」 (TV Size) (エンディング「きっと明日は」（TVサイズ）) Ending "Certainly Tomorrow" (TV Size))

=== Ojamajo CD Club Vol. 3: Ojamajo Happy-py Drama Theater! ===
This drama CD was produced by Bandai Music Entertainment and released on 21 August 1999. It showcases the main characters at a sleepover and their magical adventure that night.

Staff:

- Script: Takashi Yamada
- Music: Keiichi Oku
- Production: Takuya Igarashi

Cast:

- Doremi Harukaze (Chiemi Chiba)
- Hazuki Fujiwara (Tomoko Akiya)
- Aiko Senoo (Yuki Matsuoka)
- Majorika (Nao Nagasawa)
- Lala (Megumi Takamura)
- Pop Harukaze (Sawa Ishige)
- Keisuke Harukaze (Yūta Mochizuki)
- Haruka Harukaze (Yuka Shino)
- Akira Fujiwara (Kenji Nomura)
- Reiko Fujiwara (Yui Maeda)
- Dodo (Yuka Tokumitsu)
- Rere (Jun Mizuki)
- Mimi / Baaya (Yuko Saitou)
- Dela (Chihiro Sakurai)
- Mota (Yuuko Kawasaki)
- Motamota (YOKO)
- Seki-sensei (Nanaho Katsuragi)
- Yuki-sensei (Yuka Imai)
- Tetsuya Kotake (Kumiko Yokote)
- Yuuji Sagawa (Reiko Fujita)
- Yutaka Oota (Noriko Fujita)
- Toyokazu Sugiyama (Reiko Kiuchi)
- Masaru Yada (Nami Miyahara)
- Marina Koizumi (Oma Ichimura)
- Reika Tamaki (Ai Nagano)
- Naomi Okuyama (Miwa Matsumoto)
- Nobuko Yokokawa (Kyoko Dounowaki)
- Kanae Iida (Ayaka Kakutani (角谷綾香))
- Kaori Shimakura (Shihomi Mizowaki)

Tracks

1. Prologue (プロローグ)
2. Opening Theme 「Ojamajo Carnival!!」 (TV Size) (オープニングテーマ「おジャ魔女カーニバル！！」（TVサイズ）)
3. Fujiwara-ke ~Oshokuji ni Suru? Ofuro ni Suru?~ (藤原家～お食事にする？お風呂にする？～ Fujiwara House ~Eat a Meal? Take a Bath?~)
4. Doremi no Kangofu Hen (どれみの看護婦篇 Doremi's Nurse Story)
5. Hazuki no Heya ~Intermission~ (はづきの部屋～インターミッション～ Hazuki's Room ~Intermission~)
6. Hazuki no Joshi Pro Wrestler Hen (はづきのプロレスラー篇 Hazuki's Female Pro Wrestler Story)
7. Hazuki no Heya ~Intermission~ (はづきの部屋～インターミッション～ Hazuki's Room ~Intermission~)
8. Ojamajo Sanpun no Cooking!! (おジャ魔女三分のクッキング！！ Ojamajo Three-Minute Cooking!!)
9. Aiko no Keiji Hen (あいこの刑事篇 Aiko's Detective Story)
10. Epilogue ~ Ending Theme 「Kitto Ashita wa」 (TV Size) (エピローグ～エンディングテーマ きっと明日は「きっと明日は」（TVサイズ） Ending "Certainly Tomorrow" (TV Size))

=== Ojamajo CD Club Vol. 4: Ojamajo Solo Vocal Collection - Doremi Harukaze ===
This CD, containing Doremi Harukaze's image songs, was produced by Bandai Music Entertainment and released on 21 October 1999.

Staff

- Artist/Cast: Doremi Harukaze (Chiemi Chiba)
- Composers: Takeshi Ike [7]; Keiichi Oku [2-5]
- Arrangers: Keiichi Oku [2-5]; Masayuki Sakamoto [7]
- Lyricist: Sachiko Oomori (大森祥子)

Tracks

1. Opening Narration (オープニングナレーション)
2. Otome wa Kyu ni Tomarenai (乙女は急に止まれない Maiden, Don't Stop Abruptly)
3. Kitto Chanto Onnanoko (きっとちゃんと女の子 Certainly a Perfect Girl)
4. Otome wa Kyu ni Tomarenai (Original Karaoke) (乙女は急に止まれない（オリギナルカラオケ） Maiden, Don't Stop Abruptly (Original Karaoke))
5. Kitto Chanto Onnanoko (Original Karaoke) きっとちゃんと女の子（オリギナルカラオケ） Certainly a Perfect Girl (Original Karaoke))
6. Ending Narration (エンディングナレーション)
7. Ojamajo Carnival!! (Original Karaoke) (おジャ魔女カーニバル！！（オリジナルカラオケ）)

=== Ojamajo CD Club Vol. 5: Ojamajo Solo Vocal Collection - Hazuki Fujiwara ===
This CD, containing Hazuki Fujiwara's image songs, was produced by Bandai Music Entertainment and released on 21 October 1999.

Staff

- Artist/Cast: Hazuki Fujiwara (Tomoko Akiya)
- Composers: Keiichi Oku [2-5]; Banchou Mehara (芽原万超) [7]
- Arrangers: Masahiro Kawasaki [7]; Keiichi Oku [2-5]
- Lyricist: Sachiko Oomori (大森祥子) [2,3]

Tracks

1. Opening Narration (オープニングナレーション)
2. Tsukiyo no Mahou (月夜の魔法 Moonlit Night Magic)
3. Ashita no Watashi (明日の私 Tomorrow's Me)
4. Tsukiyo no Mahou (Original Karaoke) (月夜の魔法（オリギナルカラオケ） Moonlit Night Magic (Original Karaoke))
5. Ashita no Watashi (Original Karaoke) 明日の私（オリギナルカラオケ） Tomorrow's Me (Original Karaoke))
6. Ending Narration (エンディングナレーション)
7. Kitto Ashita wa (Original Karaoke) (おジャ魔女カーニバル！！（オリジナルカラオケ） Certainly Tomorrow (Original Karaoke))

=== Ojamajo CD Club Vol. 6: Ojamajo Solo Vocal Collection - Aiko Senoo ===
This CD, containing Aiko Senoo's image songs, was produced by Bandai Music Entertainment and released on 21 October 1999.

Staff

- Artist/Cast: Aiko Senoo (Yuki Matsuoka)
- Composers: Miki Matsubara [7]; Keiichi Oku [2-5]
- Arrangers: MT-DRIVE [7]; Keiichi Oku [2-5]
- Lyricist: Sachiko Oomori (大森祥子) [2,3]

Tracks

1. Opening Narration (オープニングナレーション)
2. Aiko ni Omakase! (あいこにおまかせ！ Leave It to Aiko!)
3. Paatto Ikou!! (パーっといこう！！ Let's Go All Out!!)
4. Aiko ni Omakase! (Original Karaoke) (あいこにおまかせ！（オリジナルカラオケ） Leave It to Aiko! (Original Karaoke))
5. Paatto Ikou!! (Original Karaoke) (パーっといこう！！（オリジナルカラオケ） Let's Go All Out!! (Original Karaoke))
6. Ending Narration (エンディングナレーション)
7. Mahō de Choi^{2} (Original Karaoke) (魔法でチョイ^{2}（オリジナルカラオケ） Effortless Magic (Original Karaoke))

=== Ojamajo CD Club Vol. 7: MAHO-Dou's Ojamajo Christmas Carnival ===
This CD, featuring Christmas songs as sung by MAHO-Dou, was produced by Bandai Music Entertainment and released on 21 November 1999.

Staff

- Artist: MAHO-Dou
- Composers: Gene Autry [5]; John Frederick Coots [3]; Henry Gillespie [3]; Franz Zaber Gruber [6]; Oakley Haldeman [5]; Takeshi Ike [1]; Johnny Marks [4]; James S. Pierpont [2]
- Arranger: Masayuki Sakamoto
- Lyricists: Gene Autry [5]; John Frederick Coots [3]; Henry Gillespie [3]; Oakley Haldeman [5]; Johnny Marks [4]; Josef Mohr [6]; James S. Pierpont [2]; Sachiko Oomori (大森祥子) [1]
- Translators: Kanbe Takao [3]; Kou Yuuki [6]; Takashi Otowa (音羽たかし) [2]; Nobuo Shinden (新田宣夫) [4]; Rokurou Akashi (明石六朗) [5]

Tracks

1. Ojamajo Carnival!! (おジャ魔女カーニバル！！)
2. Jingle Bell (ジングル・ベル Jingle Bells)
3. Santa ga Machi ni Yattekuru (サンタが街にやってくる Santa Claus is Coming to Town)
4. Akahana no Tonakai (赤鼻のトナカイ Rudolph the Red-Nosed Reindeer)
5. Santa Claus ga Yattekuru (サンタクロースがやってくる Here Comes Santa Claus)
6. Kiyoshi Kono Yoru (Sanbika 109-ban) (きよしこの夜（賛美歌109番） Silent Night (Hymn #109))

=== Ojamajo Doremi Memorial CD Box ===
This four-disc collection was produced by Marvelous Entertainment, Inc., and released on 21 December 2003. It contains all of the above tracks and also includes some extra background music (labeled as M-**), composed and arranged by Keiichi Oku.

DISC 1

1. Ojamajo Talk Sono 1 (おジャ魔女トーク その1 Ojamajo Talk Part 1)
2. Ojamajo Carnival!! (おジャ魔女カーニバル！！)
3. Pirikapiri♥Lucky! (ピリカピリ♥ラッキー!)
4. Dokidoki no Mahou (ドキドキの魔法 Heart-Beating Magic)
5. Dela's Song (デラ's Song)
6. Ojamajo Talk Sono 2 (おジャ魔女トーク その2 Ojamajo Talk Part 2)
7. Nichiyoubi wa Mahou no Ko (日曜日は魔法のコ Sunday is Magic's Child)
8. Mahō de Choi^{2} (魔法でチョイ^{2} Effortless Magic)
9. Kotori no Kimochi (小鳥の気持ち The Small Bird's Feelings)
10. Gokigen Yoroshiku!! (ゴキゲンよろしく！！ Nice to Meet You!!)
11. Juubyou Kazoete (10秒かぞえて Count 10 Seconds)
12. Ojamajo Talk Sono 3 (おジャ魔女トーク その3 Ojamajo Talk Part 3)
13. Onnanoko wa Benkyoujuu! (女の子は勉強中！ The Girl is Studying!)
14. Kitto Ashita wa (きっと明日は Certainly Tomorrow)
15. M-10
16. M-17A
17. M-23
18. M-24
19. M-25A
20. M-26
21. M-28
22. M-30
23. M-31
24. M-36B
25. M-37
26. M-40
27. M-45

DISC 2

1. Opening 「Ojamajo Carnival!!」 (TV Size) (オープニング「おジャ魔女カーニバル！！」（TVサイズ）)
2. Kyou mo Genki ni Ittemiyo! (今日も元気にいってみよ！ Let's Be Cheerful Again Today!)
3. Pretty Witchy Doremi-chi (プリチー・ウィッチー・どれみッチー)
4. Ojama ni Daikatsuyaku! (おジャ魔に大活躍！ Ojama Stellar Performance!)
5. Pretty Witchy Hazuki-chi (プリチー・ウィッチー・はづきッチー)
6. Suteki na MAHO-Dou (ステキなMAHO堂 Wonderful MAHO-Dou)
7. Pretty Witchy Aiko-chi (プリチー・ウィッチー・あいこッチー)
8. Sannen Nikumi no Nakamatachi (3年2組の仲間たち Friends of Class 3–2)
9. Ayashii Yokan (あやしい予感 Strange Premonition)
10. Wakuwaku Kokishi Dokidoki Daiboken (ワクワク好奇心 ドキドキ大冒険 Excited Curiosity, Heart-Racing Adventure)
11. Sasai na Kuchigenka (ささいな口ゲンカ Trivial Argument)
12. Yumemiru Onnanoko (夢みる女の子 Dreaming Girl)
13. Sekai Ichi Fuko na Bishōjo? (世界いち不幸な美少女？ The World's Unluckiest Beautiful Girl?)
14. Shinpi no Majokai (神秘の魔女界 Mysterious Witch World)
15. Chikara wo Awasete! (力をあわせて！ Gather Our Powers!)
16. Happy Lucky Minna ni To~doke! (ハッピー ラッキー みんなにと～どけ！ I Wish Happiness and Luck To Everyone!)
17. Ending 「Kitto Ashita wa」 (TV Size) (エンディング「きっと明日は」（TVサイズ）) Ending "Certainly Tomorrow" (TV Size))

DISC 3

1. Prologue (プロローグ)
2. Opening Theme 「Ojamajo Carnival!!」 (TV Size) (オープニングテーマ おジャ魔女カーニバル!!（TVサイズ）)
3. Fujiwara-ke ~Oshokuji ni Suru? Ofuro ni Suru?~ (藤原家～お食事にする？お風呂にする？～ Fujiwara House ~Eat a Meal? Take a Bath?~)
4. Doremi no Kangofu Hen (どれみの看護婦篇 Doremi's Nurse Story)
5. Hazuki no Heya ~Intermission~ (はづきの部屋～インターミッション～ Hazuki's Room ~Intermission~)
6. Hazuki no Joshi Pro Wrestler Hen (はづきの女子プロレスラー篇 Hazuki's Female Pro Wrestler Story)
7. Hazuki no Heya ~Intermission~ (はづきの部屋～インターミッション～ Hazuki's Room ~Intermission~)
8. Ojamajo Sanpun no Cooking!! (おジャ魔女三分のクッキング！！ Ojamajo Three-Minute Cooking!!)
9. Aiko no Keiji Hen (あいこの刑事篇 Aiko's Detective Story)
10. Epilogue - Ending Theme 「Kitto Ashita wa」 (TV Size) (エピローグ - エンディングテーマ きっと明日は（TVサイズ） Epilogue - Ending Theme "Certainly Tomorrow" (TV Size))
11. M-46B
12. M-48
13. M-49A
14. M-51
15. M-55A
16. M-61A
17. M-70
18. M-74
19. M-75A
20. M-76A
21. M-78A

DISC 4

1. Opening Narration (Doremi Hen) (オープニングナレーション（どれみ篇） Opening Narration (Doremi Volume))
2. Otome wa Kyu ni Tomarenai (乙女は急に止まれない Maiden, Don't Stop Abruptly)
3. Kitto Chanto Onnanoko (きっとちゃんと女の子 Certainly a Perfect Girl)
4. Otome wa Kyu ni Tomarenai (Original Karaoke) (乙女は急に止まれない（オリギナルカラオケ） Maiden, Don't Stop Abruptly (Original Karaoke))
5. Kitto Chanto Onnanoko (Original Karaoke) きっとちゃんと女の子（オリギナルカラオケ） Certainly a Perfect Girl (Original Karaoke))
6. Ending Narration (エンディングナレーション)
7. Ojamajo Carnival!! (Original Karaoke) (おジャ魔女カーニバル！！（オリジナルカラオケ）)
8. Opening Narration (Hazuki Hen) (オープニングナレーション（はづき篇） Opening Narration (Hazuki Volume))
9. Tsukiyo no Mahou (月夜の魔法 Moonlit Night Magic)
10. Ashita no Watashi (明日の私 My Tomorrow)
11. Tsukiyo no Mahou (Original Karaoke) (月夜の魔法（オリギナルカラオケ） Moonlit Night Magic (Original Karaoke))
12. Ashita no Watashi (Original Karaoke) 明日の私（オリギナルカラオケ） My Tomorrow (Original Karaoke))
13. Ending Narration (エンディングナレーション)
14. Kitto Ashita wa (Original Karaoke) (おジャ魔女カーニバル！！（オリジナルカラオケ）Certainly Tomorrow (Original Karaoke))
15. Opening Narration (Aiko Hen) (オープニングナレーション（あいこ篇） Opening Narration (Aiko Volume))
16. Aiko ni Omakase! (あいこにおまかせ！ Leave It to Aiko!)
17. Paatto Ikou!! (パーっといこう！！ Let's Go All Out!!)
18. Aiko ni Omakase! (Original Karaoke) (あいこにおまかせ！（オリギナルカラオケ） Leave It to Aiko! (Original Karaoke))
19. Paatto Ikou!! (Original Karaoke) (パーっといこう！！（オリギナルカラオケ） Let's Go All Out!! (Original Karaoke))
20. Ending Narration (エンディングナレーション)
21. Mahō de Choi^{2} (Original Karaoke) (魔法でチョイ^{2}（オリギナルカラオケ） Effortless Magic (Original Karaoke))
22. Jingle Bell (ジングル・ベル Jingle Bells)
23. Santa ga Machi ni Yattekuru (サンタが街にやってくる Santa Claus is Coming to Town)
24. Akahana no Tonakai (赤鼻のトナカイ Rudolph the Red-Nosed Reindeer)
25. Santa Claus ga Yattekuru (サンタクロースがやってくる Here Comes Santa Claus)
26. Kiyoshi Kono Yoru (Sanbika 109-ban) (きよしこの夜（賛美歌109番） Silent Night (Hymn #109))

== Ojamajo Doremi # ==
=== Ojamajo wa Koko ni Iru ===
This single was produced by King Records and released on 24 March 2000. It contains the full versions of the opening and ending theme songs of the Ojamajo Doremi # series, along with karaoke versions. Beginning with this season, Rumi Shishido, voice actress of Onpu Segawa, joins the group MAHO-Dou.

Staff

- Artist: MAHO-Dou
- Composers: Keiichi Oku [1,3]; Kana Sugiyama [2,4]
- Arrangers: Megumi Maruo [2,4]; Keiichi Oku [1,3]
- Lyricists: Shouta Namikawa (並河祥太) [1]; Kana Sugiyama [2]

Tracks

1. Ojamajo wa Koko ni Iru (おジャ魔女はココにいる The Ojamajo Are Here)
2. Koe wo Kikasete (声をきかせて Let Me Hear Your Voice)
3. Ojamajo wa Koko ni Iru (Original Karaoke) (声をきかせて（オリジナルカラオケ） The Ojamajo Are Here (Original Karaoke)
4. Koe wo Kikasete (Original Karaoke) (声をきかせて（オリジナルカラオケ） Let Me Hear Your Voice (Original Karaoke))

=== MAHO-Dou CD Collection Part 1: Soundtrack Volume 1 ===
This CD was produced by King Records and released on 21 June 2000. It contains the music used during the first half of the series. Although labeled as "Volume 1," there was never a Volume 2 released.

Staff

- Artist: MAHO-Dou [2,9,17]
- Composers: Takashi Mori (堀 隆) [2]; Keiichi Oku [1,3-8,10-16]; Kana Sugiyama [17]; Eri Takeda [9]
- Arrangers: Megumi Maruo [17]; Takashi Mori (堀 隆) [2]; Keiichi Oku [1,3-8,10-16]; Toshiyuki Oomori (大森俊之) [9]
- Lyricists: Shiho Aiyoshi (相吉志保) [9] Shouta Namikawa (並河祥太) [2]; Kana Sugiyama [17]

Tracks

1. Doremi # (Sharp) ga Hajimaru Yo! (どれみ♯(しゃーぷっ)がはじまるよ！ Doremi # Begins!)
2. Ojamajo wa Koko ni Iru (TV Size) (おジャ魔女はココにいる（TVサイズ） The Ojamajo Are Here (TV Size))
3. Sate Kyou no Ohanashi wa? (さて 今日のおはなしは？ Well, What's Today's Story?)
4. Hana-chan no Mahou (ハナちゃんの魔法 Hana-chan's Magic)
5. Hana-chan wa Majo wo Akachan (ハナちゃんは魔女の赤ちゃん Hana-chan the Baby Witch)
6. Majo Isha Majoheart (魔女医者マジョハート Witch Doctor Majoheart)
7. Kumikyoku Alexander T. Oyajiide (組曲 アレキサンドル・T・オヤジーデ Musical Selection of Alexander T. Oyajiide)
8. Pretty Witchy Onpu-cchi (プリティー・ウィッチー・おんぷっちー Pretty Witchy Onpu-cchi)
9. Lupinus no Komoriuta (ルピナスの子守唄 Lullaby of the Lupines)
10. Oshirase Dayo! (お知らせだよ！ Notification!)
11. Lifewood wa Fushigi na Ki (ライフウッドは不思議な樹 Lifewood Is a Mysterious Tree)
12. Mou Dame Atashi Kujikesou? (もうダメ あたし くじけそう？ Am I Giving Up?)
13. Ojamajo no Debandayo! (おジャ魔女の出番だよ！ The Ojamajo's Turn!)
14. Majokai no Joousama (魔女界の女王さま Queen of the Witch World)
15. Soudayo! Zettai Daijoubu♪ (そうだよ！ ゼッタイ大丈夫♪ That's Right! Absolutely Okay♪)
16. Dokidoki Wakuwaku Kurukuru Ma~ware! (ドキドキワクワクくるくるま～われ！ Heart-Beating, Excited, Turning Around)
17. Koe wo Kikasete (TV Size) (声をきかせて（TVサイズ） Let Me Hear Your Voice (TV Size))

=== Poppu na Yuuki ===
This single was produced by King Records and released on 5 July 2000. It contains the original and karaoke versions of the theme song for the movie Pop and the Queen's Cursed Rose, as well as the ending theme for the radio show mami's RADIkaru Communication. It is the ninth single of Manami Komori.

Staff

- Artist: Manami Komori
- Composers: Fuminori Ikema [2,4]; Keiichi Oku [1,3]
- Arrangers: Fuminori Ikema [2,4]; Keiichi Oku [1,3]
- Lyricist: Manami Komori

Tracks

1. Poppu na Yuuki (ぽっぷな勇気 Pop-like Courage)
2. Himawari (ひまわり Sunflower)
3. Poppu na Yuuki (Off Vocal Version) (ぽっぷな勇気（OFF VOCAL VERSION） Pop-like Courage (Off Vocal Version))
4. Himawari (Off Vocal Version) (ひまわり（OFF VOCAL VERSION） Sunflower (Off Vocal Version))

=== MAHO-Dou CD Collection Part 2: Screen Theme and Secret Story ===
This CD was produced by King Records and released on 3 August 2000. The first half consists of audio drama tracks, while the second half contains the soundtrack to the movie Pop and the Queen's Cursed Rose.

Staff

- Artists: Manami Komori [9]; MAHO-Dou [2,7]
- Composers: Takashi Mori (堀 隆) [2]; Keiichi Oku [9-18]; Kana Sugiyama [7]
- Arrangers: Megumi Maruo [7]; Takashi Mori (堀 隆) [2]; Keiichi Oku [9-18]
- Lyricists: Manami Komori [9,18]; Shouta Namikawa (並河祥太) [2]; Kana Sugiyama [7]
- Scriptwriters: En Kuriyama (栗山縁) [3]; Yoshimi Narita [4] Akatsuki Yamatoya [5,8]

Cast

- Doremi Harukaze (Chiemi Chiba)
- Hazuki Fujiwara (Tomoko Akiya)
- Aiko Senoo (Yuki Matsuoka)
- Onpu Segawa (Rumi Shishido)
- Pop Harukaze / Fafa (Sawa Ishige)
- Hana-chan (Ikue Ootani)
- Majorika (Nao Nagasawa)
- Lala (Megumi Takamura)
- Dodo (Yuka Tokumitsu)
- Rere (Jun Mizuki)
- Mimi / Baaya (Yuko Saito)

Tracks

1. Prologue (プロローグ Prologue)
2. Ojamajo wa Koko ni Iru (おジャ魔女はココにいる The Ojamajo Are Here)
3. Aiko Hen ~ Aisuke Onii-chan no Yubiningyou (あいこ編～愛介お兄ちゃんの指人形 Aiko's Story ~ Older Brother Aisuke's Finger Puppet)
4. Hazuki Hen ~ Piano wo Oshiete (はづき編～ピアノを教えて Hazuki's Story ~ Teach Piano)
5. Onpu Hen ~ Samishikunaiyo (おんぷ編～さみしくないよ Onpu's Story ~ Not Lonely)
6. Epilogue (エピローグ Epilogue)
7. Koe wo Kikasete (声をきかせて Let Me Hear Your Voice)
8. Ojamajo Cooking Returns (おジャ魔女クッキング・リターンズ Ojamajo Cooking Returns)
9. Poppu na Yuuki (ぽっぷな勇気 Pop-like Courage)
10. Joou-sama no Himitsu no Hanazono (女王様のひみつの花園 The Queen's Secret Flower Garden)
11. Doremi to Poppu no Kenka (どれみとぽっぷのケンカ Doremi and Pop's Fight)
12. Setsunai Kimochi (切ない気もち Heart-Broken Feelings)
13. Witch Queen Heart (ウィッチー・クィーン・ハート Witch Queen Heart)
14. Minna Ganbare! (みんながんばれ！ Everyone, Go For It!)
15. Kiken na Ohana ~ Nigero Ya Nigero (危険なお花～逃げろや逃げろ Dangerous Flower ~ Run Away)
16. Doremi to Poppu no Nakanaori (どれみとぽっぷの仲なおり Doremi and Pop's Reconciliation)
17. Minna no Imouto ~ Ouchi ke Kaerou (みんなの妹～お家へ帰ろう Everyone's Little Sister ~ Let's Return Home)
18. Poppu na Yuuki (Mero Kara) (ぽっぷな勇気（メロカラ） Pop-like Courage (Melody Karaoke))

=== MAHO-Dou CD Collection Solo: Doremi Harukaze ===
This CD, containing Doremi's image song, her rendition of "Lupinasu no Komoriuta," and a short drama, was produced by King Records and released on 4 October 2000.

Staff

- Artist: Doremi Harukaze (Chiemi Chiba)
- Composers: Moto Fukuda (福田 元) [1,4]; Eri Takeda [2,5]
- Arrangers: Masaaki Iizuka [1,4]; Megumi Maruo [1,4]; Toshiyuki Oomori [2,5]
- Lyricists: Shiho Aiyoshi (相吉志保) [2]; Chiemi Chiba [1]
- Director: Takuya Igarashi [3]
- Scriptwriter: Yoshimi Narita [3]

Cast

- Doremi Harukaze (Chiemi Chiba)
- Hazuki Fujiwara (Tomoko Akiya)
- Aiko Senoo (Yuki Matsuoka)
- Onpu Segawa (Rumi Shishido)
- Pop Harukaze (Sawa Ishige)
- Hana-chan (Ikue Ootani)
- Majorika (Nao Nagasawa)
- Lala (Megumi Takamura)

Tracks

1. Ice Cream Child (アイスクリームチャイルド Ice Cream Child)
2. Lupinasu no Komoriuta (ルピナスの子守唄 Lullaby of the Lupines)
3. Mini-Drama 「Doremi no Nagga~i Ichinichi」 (ミニドラマ 「どれみのなっが～い一日」 Doremi's Lo~ng Day)
4. Ice Cream Child (Original Karaoke) (アイスクリームチャイルド（オリジナルカラオケ） Ice Cream Child (Original Karaoke))
5. Lupinasu no Komoriuta (Original Karaoke) (ルピナスの子守唄（オリジナルカラオケ） Lullaby of the Lupines (Original Karaoke))

=== MAHO-Dou CD Collection Solo: Hazuki Fujiwara ===
This CD, containing Hazuki's image song, her rendition of "Lupinasu no Komoriuta," and a short drama, was produced by King Records and released on 4 October 2000.

Staff

- Artist: Hazuki Fujiwara (Tomoko Akiya)
- Composers: Kana Sugiyama [1,4]; Eri Takeda [2,5]
- Arrangers: Megumi Maruo [1,4]; Toshiyuki Oomori [2,5]
- Lyricists: Shiho Aiyoshi (相吉志保) [2]; Kana Sugiyama [1]
- Director: Takuya Igarashi [3]
- Scriptwriter: Yoshimi Narita [3]

Cast

- Doremi Harukaze (Chiemi Chiba)
- Hazuki Fujiwara (Tomoko Akiya)
- Aiko Senoo (Yuki Matsuoka)
- Onpu Segawa (Rumi Shishido)
- Pop Harukaze (Sawa Ishige)
- Hana-chan (Ikue Ootani)
- Majorika (Nao Nagasawa)
- Lala (Megumi Takamura)
- Masaru Yada (Nami Miyahara)

Tracks

1. Mimi wo Sumashite (耳をすまして Listen)
2. Lupinasu no Komoriuta (ルピナスの子守唄 Lullaby of the Lupines)
3. Mini-Drama 「Hazuki no Nagai Nagai Ichinichi」 (ミニドラマ 「はづきの長い長い一日」 Hazuki's Long, Long Day)
4. Mimi wo Sumashite (Original Karaoke) (耳をすまして（オリジナルカラオケ） Listen (Original Karaoke))
5. Lupinasu no Komoriuta (Original Karaoke) (ルピナスの子守唄（オリジナルカラオケ） Lullaby of the Lupines (Original Karaoke))

=== MAHO-Dou CD Collection Solo: Aiko Senoo ===
This CD, containing Aiko's image song, her rendition of "Lupinasu no Komoriuta," and a short drama, was produced by King Records and released on 2 November 2000.

Staff

- Artist: Aiko Senoo (Yuki Matsuoka)
- Composers: Moto Fukuda (福田 元) [1,4]; Eri Takeda [2,5]
- Arrangers: Masaaki Iizuka [1,4]; Toshiyuki Oomori [2,5]
- Lyricists: Shiho Aiyoshi (相吉志保) [2]; Keiko Mokuhon (木本慶子) [1]
- Director: Takuya Igarashi [3]
- Scriptwriter: Yoshimi Narita [3]

Cast

- Doremi Harukaze (Chiemi Chiba)
- Hazuki Fujiwara (Tomoko Akiya)
- Aiko Senoo (Yuki Matsuoka)
- Onpu Segawa (Rumi Shishido)
- Pop Harukaze (Sawa Ishige)
- Hana-chan (Ikue Ootani)
- Majorika (Nao Nagasawa)
- Masaru Yada (Nami Miyahara)

Tracks

1. Aruki da Sou yo (歩きだそうよ Yeah, I'm on a Walk)
2. Lupinasu no Komoriuta (ルピナスの子守唄 Lullaby of the Lupines)
3. Mini-Drama 「Aiko no Meccha Naga~i Ichinichi」 (ミニドラマ 「あいこのめっちゃ長～い一日」 Aiko's Super Lo~ng Day)
4. Aruki da Sou yo (Original Karaoke) (歩きだそうよ（オリジナルカラオケ） Yeah, I'm on a Walk (Original Karaoke))
5. Lupinasu no Komoriuta (Original Karaoke) (ルピナスの子守唄（オリジナルカラオケ） Lullaby of the Lupines (Original Karaoke))

=== MAHO-Dou CD Collection Solo: Onpu Segawa ===
This CD, containing Onpu's image song, her rendition of "Lupinasu no Komoriuta," and a short drama, was produced by King Records and released on 2 November 2000.

Staff

- Artist: Onpu Segawa (Rumi Shishido)
- Composers: Hidetoshi Satou (佐藤英敏) [1,4]; Eri Takeda [2,5]
- Arrangers: Shou Gotou (五島 翔) [1,4]; Toshiyuki Oomori [2,5]
- Lyricists: Shiho Aiyoshi (相吉志保) [2]; Keiko Mokuhon (木本慶子) [1]
- Director: Takuya Igarashi [3]
- Scriptwriter: Yoshimi Narita [3]

Cast

- Doremi Harukaze (Chiemi Chiba)
- Hazuki Fujiwara (Tomoko Akiya)
- Aiko Senoo (Yuki Matsuoka)
- Onpu Segawa (Rumi Shishido)
- Pop Harukaze (Sawa Ishige)
- Hana-chan (Ikue Ootani)
- Majorika (Nao Nagasawa)
- Lala (Megumi Takamura)
- Masaru Yada (Nami Miyahara)
- Miho Segawa (Mari Adachi)

Tracks

1. half point
2. Lupinasu no Komoriuta (ルピナスの子守唄 Lullaby of the Lupines)
3. Mini-Drama 「Onpu no Tottemo Naga~i Ichinichi」 (ミニドラマ 「おんぷのとっても長い一日」 Onpu's Very Lo~ng Day)
4. half point (Original Karaoke)
5. Lupinasu no Komoriuta (Original Karaoke) (ルピナスの子守唄（オリジナルカラオケ） Lullaby of the Lupines (Original Karaoke))

=== MAHO-Dou CD Collection Part 3: Song Festival ===
This CD, containing vocalized songs and BGM from the second half of the series, was produced by King Records and released on 24 January 2001.

Staff

- Artists: Hazuki Fujiwara (Tomoko Akiya) [5]; Doremi Harukaze (Chiemi Chiba) [3]; Pop Harukaze (Sawa Ishige) [4]; MAHO-Dou [1,2,8-10]; Aiko Senoo (Yuki Matsuoka); Onpu Segawa (Rumi Shishido)
- Composers: Moto Fukuda (福田 元) [3,6]; Yuriko Kaida [4]; Takashi Mori (堀 隆) [1]; Keiichi Oku [11-20]; Toshiyuki Oomori [2,9]; Hidetoshi Satou (佐藤英敏) [7]; Kana Sugiyama [5,10]; Eri Takeda [8,21]
- Arrangers: Shou Gotou (五島 翔) [7]; Masaaki Iizuka [3,6]; Hiroshi Imaizumi [4]; Megumi Maruo [3,5,10]; Takashi Mori (堀 隆) [1]; Keiichi Oku [11-20]; Toshiyuki Oomori [2,8,9,21];
- Lyricists: Shiho Aiyoshi (相吉志保) [8]; Chiemi Chiba [3]; Keiko Mokuhon (木本慶子) [6,7]; Shouta Namikawa (並河祥太) [1,2]; Kana Sugiyama [5,10]; Eri Takeda [9]; 森林檎 [4]

Tracks

1. Ojamajo wa Koko ni Iru (おジャ魔女はココにいる The Ojamajo Are Here)
2. Tomodachi no Uta (ともだちの唄 Friends' Song)
3. Ice Cream Child (アイスクリームチャイルド Ice Cream Child)
4. Hop, Step, Pop (ホップ・ステップ・ポップ Hop, Step, Pop)
5. Mimi wo Sumashite (耳をすまして Listen)
6. Aruki da Sou yo (歩きだそうよ Yeah, I'm on a Walk)
7. half point
8. Lupinasu no Komoriuta (ルピナスの子守唄 Lullaby of the Lupines)
9. Sora Made Jumping (空までJumping Jumping As Far As the Sky)
10. Koe wo Kikasete (声をきかせて Let Me Hear Your Voice)
11. Bokutachi Elite Mahoutsukai (僕たちはエリート魔法つかい We Are Elite Wizards)
12. F wa Fujio no "F" (Fはフジオの"F" "F" Is For Fujio)
13. Onpu-chan no Theme - Solo Version (おんぷちゃんのテーマ・ソロバージョン Onpu-chan's Theme - Solo Version)
14. Mahoutsukai no Warudakumi (魔法つかいのわるだくみ The Wizards' Conspiracy)
15. L wa Leon no "L" (Lはレオンの"L" "L" Is For Leon)
16. MAHO-Dou wa Kyou mo Oosawagi (MAHO堂は今日も大騒ぎ MAHO-Dou Is in an Uproar Today)
17. A wa Akatsuki no "A" (Aは暁の"A" "A" Is For Akatsuki)
18. Ojamajo Power Up! (Wreath Poron & Poppu no Shin Poron) (おジャ魔女パワーアップ！（リースポロン＆ぽっぷの新ポロン） Ojamajo Power Up! (Wreath Poron & Pop's New Poron))
19. Hana-chan no Pinch (ハナちゃんのピンチ！ Hana-chan's Pinch)
20. T wa Tooru no "T" (Tはトオルの"T" "T" Is For Tooru)
21. Lupinasu no Komoriuta - Piano Version (ルピナスの子守唄・ピアノソロバージョン Lullaby of the Lupines - Piano Version)

=== Ojamajo Doremi # Memorial CD Box ===
This four-disc collection was produced by King Record Co., Ltd., and released on 27 November 2003. It contains all of the above tracks and some extra ones. Disc 4 also contains music from the Mo~tto! Ojamajo Doremi movie Secret of the Frog Stone.

DISC 1

1. Doremi # (Sharp) ga Hajimaru Yo! (どれみ♯(しゃーぷっ)がはじまるよ！ Doremi # Begins!)
2. Sate Kyou no Ohanashi wa? (さて 今日のおはなしは？ Well, What's Today's Story?)
3. Hana-chan no Mahou (ハナちゃんの魔法 Hana-chan's Magic)
4. Hana-chan wa Majo wo Akachan (ハナちゃんは魔女の赤ちゃん Hana-chan the Baby Witch)
5. Majo Isha Majoheart (魔女医者マジョハート Witch Doctor Majoheart)
6. Kumikyoku Alexander T. Oyajiide (組曲 アレキサンドル・T・オヤジーデ Musical Selection of Alexander T. Oyajiide)
7. Pretty Witchy Onpu-cchi (プリティー・ウィッチー・おんぷっちー)
8. Lifewood wa Fushigi na Ki (ライフウッドは不思議な樹 Lifewood Is a Mysterious Tree)
9. Mou Dame Atashi Kujikesou? (もうダメ あたし くじけそう？ Am I Giving Up?)
10. Ojamajo no Debandayo! (おジャ魔女の出番だよ！ The Ojamajo's Turn!)
11. Majokai no Joousama (魔女界の女王さま Queen of the Witch World)
12. Oshirase Dayo! (お知らせだよ！ Notification!)
13. Bokutachi Elite Mahoutsukai (僕たちはエリート魔法つかい We Are Elite Wizards)
14. F wa Fujio no "F" (Fはフジオの"F" "F" Is For Fujio)
15. L wa Leon no "L" (Lはレオンの"L" "L" Is For Leon)
16. A wa Akatsuki no "A" (Aは暁の"A" "A" Is For Akatsuki)
17. T wa Tooru no "T" (Tはトオルの"T" "T" Is For Tooru)
18. Onpu-chan no Theme - Solo Version (おんぷちゃんのテーマ・ソロバージョン Onpu-chan's Theme - Solo Version)
19. Mahoutsukai no Warudakumi (魔法つかいのわるだくみ The Wizards' Conspiracy)
20. Hana-chan no Pinch! (ハナちゃんのピンチ！ Hana-chan's Pinch!)
21. Ojamajo Power Up! (Wreath Poron & Poppu no Shin Poron) (おジャ魔女パワーアップ！（リースポロン＆ぽっぷの新ポロン） Ojamajo Power Up! (Wreath Poron & Pop's New Poron))
22. MAHO-Dou wa Kyou mo Oosawagi (MAHO堂は今日も大騒ぎ MAHO-Dou Is in an Uproar Today)
23. Soudayo! Zettai Daijoubu♪ (そうだよ！ ゼッタイ大丈夫♪ That's Right! Absolutely Okay♪)
24. Dokidoki Wakuwaku Kurukuru Ma~ware! (ドキドキワクワクくるくるま～われ！ Heart-Beating, Excited, Turning Around!)
25. Ice Cream Child (Karaoke) (アイスクリームチャイルド（カラオケ） Ice Cream Child (Karaoke))
26. Mimi wo Sumashite (Karaoke) (耳をすまして（カラオケ） Listen (Karaoke))
27. Aruki da Sou yo (Karaoke) (歩きだそうよ（カラオケ） Yeah, I'm on a Walk (Karaoke))
28. half point (Karaoke) (half point （カラオケ）)

DISC 2

1. Ojamajo wa Koko ni Iru (おジャ魔女はココにいる The Ojamajo Are Here)
2. Sora Made Jumping (空までJumping Jumping As Far As the Sky)
3. Lupinasu no Komoriuta (ルピナスの子守唄 Lullaby of the Lupines)
4. Ice Cream Child (アイスクリームチャイルド Ice Cream Child)
5. Mimi wo Sumashite (耳をすまして Listen Carefully)
6. Aruki da Sou yo (歩きだそうよ Yeah, I'm on a Walk)
7. half point
8. Hop, Step, Pop (ホップ・ステップ・ポップ Hop, Step, Pop)
9. Tomodachi no Uta (ともだちの唄 Friends' Song)
10. Koe wo Kikasete (声をきかせて Let Me Hear Your Voice)
11. Lupinasu no Komoriuta (Doremi) (ルピナスの子守唄（どれみ） Lullaby of the Lupines (Doremi))
12. Lupinasu no Komoriuta (Hazuki) (ルピナスの子守唄（はづき） Lullaby of the Lupines (Hazuki))
13. Lupinasu no Komoriuta (Aiko) (ルピナスの子守唄（あいこ） Lullaby of the Lupines (Aiko))
14. Lupinasu no Komoriuta (Onpu) (ルピナスの子守唄（おんぷ） Lullaby of the Lupines (Onpu))
15. Ojamajo wa Koko ni Iru (TV Size) (おジャ魔女はココにいる（TVサイズ） The Ojamajo Are Here (TV Size))
16. Koe wo Kikasete (TV Size) (声をきかせて（TVサイズ） Let Me Hear Your Voice (TV Size))
17. Sora Made Jumping (Karaoke) (空までJumping(カラオケ) Jumping As Far As the Sky (Karaoke))
18. Tomodachi no Uta (Karaoke) (ともだちの唄(カラオケ) Friends' Song (Karaoke))
19. Lupinasu no Komoriuta (Karaoke) (ルピナスの子守唄(カラオケ) Lullaby of the Lupines (Karaoke))
20. Ojamajo wa Koko ni Iru (Karaoke) (おジャ魔女はココにいる(カラオケ) The Ojamajo Are Here (Karaoke))
21. Koe wo Kikasete (Karaoke) (声をきかせて(カラオケ) Let Me Hear Your Voice (Karaoke))

DISC 3

1. Prologue (プロローグ Prologue)
2. Ojamajo wa Koko ni Iru (おジャ魔女はココにいる The Ojamajo Are Here)
3. Drama 1 - Aiko Hen 「Aisuke Onii-chan no Yubiningyou」 (ドラマ1 あいこ編 「愛介お兄ちゃんの指人形」 Drama 1 - Aiko's Story "Older Brother Aisuke's Hand Puppet")
4. Drama 2 - Hazuki Hen 「Piano wo Oshiete」 (ドラマ2 はづき編 「ピアノを教えて」 Drama 2 - Hazuki's Story "Teach Piano")
5. Drama 3 - Onpu Hen 「Samishikunaiyo」 (ドラマ3 おんぷ編 「さみしくないよ」 Drama 3 - Onpu's Story "Not Lonely")
6. Epilogue (エピローグ Epilogue)
7. Koe wo Kikasete (声をきかせて Let Me Hear Your Voice)
8. Drama 4 - Ojamajo Cooking Returns (ドラマ4 おジャ魔女クッキング・リターンズ Drama 4 - Ojamajo Cooking Returns)
9. Mini-Drama 「Doremi no Nagga~i Ichinichi」 (ミニドラマ 「どれみのなっが～い一日」 Doremi's Lo~ng Day)
10. Mini-Drama 「Hazuki no Nagai Nagai Ichinichi」 (ミニドラマ 「はづきの長い長い一日」 Hazuki's Long, Long Day)
11. Mini-Drama 「Onpu no Tottemo Naga~i Ichinichi」 (ミニドラマ 「おんぷのとっても長い一日」 Onpu's Very Lo~ng Day)
12. Mini-Drama 「Aiko no Meccha Naga~i Ichinichi」 (ミニドラマ 「あいこのめっちゃ長～い一日」 Aiko's Super Lo~ng Day)

DISC 4

1. Poppu na Yuuki (ぽっぷな勇気 Pop-like Courage)
2. Joōu-sama no Himitsu no Hanazono (女王様のひみつの花園 The Queen's Secret Flower Garden)
3. Doremi to Poppu no Kenka (どれみとぽっぷのケンカ Doremi and Pop's Fight)
4. Setsunai Kimochi (切ない気もち Heart-Broken Feelings)
5. Witch Queen Heart (ウィッチー・クィーン・ハート Witch Queen Heart)
6. Minna Ganbare! (みんながんばれ！ Everyone, Go For It!)
7. Kiken na Ohana ~ Nigero Ya Nigero (危険なお花～逃げろや逃げろ Dangerous Flower ~ Run Away)
8. Doremi to Poppu no Nakanaori (どれみとぽっぷの仲なおり Doremi and Pop's Reconciliation)
9. Minna no Imouto ~ Ouchi ke Kaerou (みんなの妹～お家へ帰ろう Everyone's Little Sister ~ Let's Return Home)
10. Poppu na Yuuki (Mero Kara) (ぽっぷな勇気（メロカラ） Pop-like Courage (Melody Karaoke))
11. Lupinasu no Komoriuta - Piano Version (ルピナスの子守唄・ピアノソロバージョン Lullaby of the Lupines - Piano Version)
12. Natsu no Mahou (夏のまほう Summer Magic)
13. Kaeru ga Hitotsu Nakya (カエルが一つなきゃ If a Frog Cries Once)
14. Mayuri no Ai no Theme (Gekijou You BGM) (「魔百合の愛のテーマ」(劇場用BGM) Mayuri's Love Theme (BGM for Theater))
15. Kaeru ga Hitotsu Nakya (Gekijou BGM) (カエルが一つなきゃ(劇場 Version) If a Frog Cries Once (Theater Version))
16. Natsu no Mahou (Original Karaoke) (夏のまほう(オリジナルカラオケ) Summer Magic (Original Karaoke))
17. Kaeru ga Hitotsu Nakya (Original Karaoke) (カエルが一つなきゃ(オリジナルカラオケ) If a Frog Cries Once (Original Karaoke))
18. Lupinasu no Komoriuta (Another Version) (ルピナスの子守唄(Another Version) Lullaby of the Lupines (Another Version))
19. Hop, Step, Pop (Merokara) (ホップ・ステップ・ポップ(メロカラ) Hop, Step, Pop (Melody Karaoke))
20. Sora Made Jumping (Merokara) (空までJumping(メロカラ) Jumping As Far As the Sky (Melody Karaoke))
21. Tomodachi no Uta (Merokara) (ともだちの唄(メロカラ) Friends' Song (Melody Karaoke))
22. Koe wo Kikasete (Merokara) (声をきかせて(メロカラ) Let Me Hear Your Voice (Melody Karaoke))

== Mo~tto! Ojamajo Doremi! ==
=== Ojamajo de BAN^{2} ===
This single contains the full versions of the opening and ending theme songs of the Mo~tto! Ojamajo Doremi series, along with karaoke versions. It was produced by Marvelous Entertainment, Inc., and released by Vap, Inc., on 21 February 2001. Beginning with this series, Nami Miyahara, voice actress of Momoko Asuka, joined the group MAHO-Dou.

Staff

- Artists: Yui Komuro [2]; MAHO-Dou [1]
- Composers: Maki Kayahara (茅原万起) [2,4]; Yasuo Kosugi [1,3]
- Arranger: Ayumi Yasui
- Lyricists: Maki Kayahara (茅原万起) [2,4]; Reo Satonozuka [1,3]

Tracks

1. Ojamajo de BAN^{2} (おジャ魔女でBAN^{2} Ojamajo BAN BAN)
2. Takaramono (たからもの Treasures)
3. Ojamajo de BAN^{2} (Original Karaoke) (おジャ魔女でBAN^{2}（オリジナルカラオケ） Ojamajo BAN BAN (Original Karaoke))
4. Takaramono (Original Karaoke) (たからもの（オリジナルカラオケ） Treasures (Original Karaoke)

=== Ojamajo BAN^{2} CD Club Part 1: Ojamajo New BGM Collection ===
This CD, featuring the background music of the series, was produced by Marvelous Entertainment, Inc., and released by Vap, Inc., on 23 March 2001.

Staff

- Artists: Yui Komuro [16]; MAHO-Dou [2]
- Composers: Maki Kayahara (茅原万起) [9,16]; Yasuo Kosugi [2,10]; Keiichi Oku [1,3-8,11-15]
- Arrangers: Keiichi Oku [1,3-8,11-15]; Ayumi Yasui [2,9,10,16]
- Lyricists: Maki Kayahara (茅原万起) [9,16]; Reo Satonozuka [2,10]

Tracks

1. Opening (オープニング)
2. Ojamajo de BAN^{2} (TV Size) (おジャ魔女でBAN^{2}（TVサイズ） Ojamajo BAN BAN (TV Size))
3. Shiawase Kibun wo Meshiagare (幸せ気分を召し上がれ Eating a Lucky Feeling)
4. America Gaeri no Majo Minarai (アメリカ帰りの魔女見習い The American Witch Apprentice)
5. Ukiuki♪ Mahou Time (ウキウキ♪魔法タイム Cheerful♪ Magic Time)
6. Atsumare! Ojamajo Ko (集まれ！おジャ魔女娘 Gather Around! Ojamajo Children)
7. Aratanaru Shiren 「Genrouin no Theme」~「Ojamajo de BAN^{2}」Arrange-kyoku~「Magical Stage」 (新たなる試練「元老院のテーマ」～「おジャ魔女でBAN2」アレンジ曲～「マジカルステージ」 New Trials "Senate Theme" ~ "Ojamajo BAN BAN" Arrangement ~ "Magical Stage")
8. Mo~tto! Suteki na Ashita ni 「Takaramono」Arrange-kyoku ~「Ojamajo de BAN^{2}」Arrange-kyoku (も～っと！素敵な明日に「たからもの」アレンジ曲～「おジャ魔女でBAN2」アレンジ曲 More! Wonderful Tomorrow "Treasures" Arrangement ~ "Ojamajo BAN BAN" Arrangement)
9. Takaramono (Instrumental Version) (「たからもの」(インストゥルメンタル・ヴァージョン) Treasures (Instrumental Version))
10. Ojamajo de BAN^{2} (Instrumental Version) (「おジャ魔女でBAN2」(インストゥルメンタル・ヴァージョン) Ojamajo BAN BAN (Instrumental Version))
11. Ogenki Shirushi wa Sanjuumaru! (お元気印は三重丸！ Very Good Marks of Energy!)
12. Zukkoke Otoboke Unlucky (ズッコケおとぼけアンラッキー Cut Loose, Foolish, Unlucky)
13. Ojamajo Daifunsen (おジャ魔女大奮戦 Ojamajo Big Fight)
14. Majokai Eno Tobira (魔女界への扉 Door to the Witch World)
15. Kokoro to Kokoro no Harukaze Mayou (心と心の春風もよう Heart to Heart in the Spring Wind)
16. Takaramono (TV Size) （たからもの（TVサイズ） Treasures (TV Size)

=== Ojamajo BAN^{2} CD Club Part 2: Mo~tto! Ojamajo Swe~et Song Collection ===
This CD, containing new and old vocal songs and background music, was produced by Marvelous Entertainment, Inc, and released by Vap, Inc., on 23 May 2001.

Staff

- Artists: Mayumi Gojou [2,5,11]; Nozomi Inoue [15]; Yui Komuro [16]; MAHO-Dou [1,7,14]; Naoko Matsudaida (松平直子) [8,10]; Yuki Matsuura [9,12]; Nao Nagasawa (Majorika) [3]; Chihiro Sakurai (Dela) [4]
- Composers: Shin Abe (阿部真) [8]; Takeshi Ike [3]; Nozomi Inoue [15]; Maki Kayahara (茅原万起) [16]; Yasuo Kosugi [1,14]; Miki Matsubara [2,4,5,10,11]; Yuki Matsuura [9,12]; Keiichi Oku [6,7,13]
- Arrangers: Yuki Matsuura [9]; MT-DRIVE [2]; Kazuo Nobuta [8,10]; Keiichi Oku [6,7,13]; Masayuki Sakamoto [3,5,12]; Tatsumi Yano [4]; Ayumi Yasui [1,11,14-16]
- Lyricists: Nozomi Inoue [15]; Yumi Kageyama (影山由美) [7 (original draft)]; Maki Kayahara (茅原万起) [16]; Miki Matsubara [2,5,11]; Yuki Matsuura [9,12]; Sachiko Ōmori (大森祥子) [8,10]; Reo Satonozuka [1,14]; Misuke Yunoki (柚木美祐) [3,4,7]

Tracks

1. Ojamajo de BAN^{2} (おジャ魔女でBAN^{2} Ojamajo BAN BAN)
2. Mahō de Choi^{2} (魔法でチョイ^{2} Effortless Magic)
3. Majorika Bravo! (マジョリカ・ブラボー！)
4. Dela's Song (デラ's Song)
5. Ganbarimasu~!! (ガンバリマス～ッ！！ Try Your Best!!)
6. BGM(1)「Megezu ni Fight!」M67.M58.M39 (BGM(1)「めげずにファイト！」M67.M58.M39 BGM(1) "Fight Without Giving Up!" M67.M58.M39)
7. Swe~et Song ABC (すい～とそんぐABC)
8. Kotori no Kimochi (小鳥の気持ち The Small Bird's Feelings)
9. Dokidoki no Mahou (ドキドキの魔法 Heart-Beating Magic)
10. Kyou Kara Tomodachi (今日から友達 Friend Starting Today)
11. Miracle☆Power (ミラクル☆パワー)
12. caramel (caramel-キャラメル-)
13. BGM(2)「Tsunoru Omoi」M42.M60.M47 (BGM(2)「つのる想い」M42.M60.M47 BGM(2) "Feelings Growing Stronger" M42.M60.M47)
14. Honjama Ojamajo Daishuugou!! (ほんじゃまおジャ魔女大集合！！ Then, Great Ojamajo Gathering!!)
15. Owaranai Monogatari (終わらない物語 Never-Ending Story)
16. Takaramono (たからもの Treasures)

=== Ojamajo BAN^{2} CD Club Part 3: Ojamajo Musical Vocal Collection ===
This CD, containing revocalized versions of old and new songs and their karaoke counterparts, was produced by Marvelous Entertainment, Inc., and released by Vap, Inc., on 21 June 2001. The +1 and +2 versions refer to the addition of Rumi Shishido and Nami Miyahara to the staff. The MAHO-Dou version uses the group instead of Mayumi Gojō, the original artist.

Staff

- Artists: MAHO-Dou [1-3,5,11]; Yūta Mochizuki (King of the Music World) [6]; Hiroki Takahashi (Fright) [4]; Naozumi Takahashi (Tachyon) [4]
- Composers: Takashi Hori (堀 隆) [3]; Takeshi Ike [1,7]; Yasuo Kosuge [11]; Miki Matsubara [2,8] Keiichi Oku [4,6,9,10]; Eri Takeda [5]
- Arrangers: Takashi Hori (堀 隆) [3]; Sachiko Oomori (大森祥子) [5]; Masayuki Sakamoto [1,2,4,6-10]; Ayumi Yasui [11]
- Lyricists: Shiho Aiyoshi (相吉志保) [5]; Shouta Namikawa (並河祥太) [3]; Sachiko Oomori (大森祥子) [1,7]; Reo Satanozuka [4,6,9-11]; Misuke Yunoki (柚木美祐) [2,8]

Tracks

1. Ojamajo Carnival!! (+2 Version) (おジャ魔女カーニバル！！（+2 Version）)
2. Pirikapiri♥Lucky! (MAHO-Dou Version) (ピリカピリ♥ラッキー!（MAHO堂 Version）)
3. Ojamajo wa Koko ni Iru (+1 Version) (おジャ魔女はココにいる（+1 Version） The Ojamajo Are Here (+1 Version))
4. Omae ni Rock You! (おまえに Rock You！ We Rock You!)
5. Lupinus no Komoriuta (+1 Version) (ルピナスの子守唄（+1 Version） Lullaby of the Lupines (+1 Version))
6. Daichi ni Sasageru Uta (大地に捧げる歌 Song Dedicated To the Earth)
7. Ojamajo Carnival!! (+2 Version) (Original Karaoke) (おジャ魔女カーニバル！！（+2 Version）（オリジナルカラオケ）)
8. Pirikapiri♥Lucky! (MAHO-Dou Version) (Original Karaoke) (ピリカピリ♥ラッキー!（MAHO堂 Version）（オリジナルカラオケ）)
9. Omae ni Rock You! (Original Karaoke) (おまえに Rock You！（オリジナルカラオケ） We Rock You!)
10. Daichi ni Sasageru Uta (Original Karaoke) (大地に捧げる歌（オリジナルカラオケ） Song Dedicated To the Earth (Original Karaoke))
11. Ojamajo de BAN^{2} (おジャ魔女でBAN^{2} Ojamajo BAN BAN)

=== Natsu no Mahou ===
This single, containing the full versions of the ending and exclusive insert song of the Mo~tto! Ojamajo Doremi movie "Secret of the Frog Stone," was produced by Marvelous Entertainment, Inc., and released by Vap, Inc, on 4 July 2001.

Staff

- Artists: MAHO-Dou, Mayumi Gojou [2]
- Composer: Takeshi Ike
- Arranger: Kazuo Nobuta
- Lyricists: Midori Kuriyama [2,4]; Misuke Yunoki (柚木美祐) [1,3]

Tracks

1. ED Theme「Natsu no Mahō」 (EDテーマ「夏のまほう」 ED Theme "Summer Magic")
2. Sonyuka「Kaeru ga Hitotsu Nakya」 (挿入歌「カエルが一つなきゃ」 BGM "If a Frog Cries Once")
3. ED Theme「Natsu no Mahō」(Original Karaoke) (EDテーマ「夏のまほう」（オリジナルカラオケ） ED Theme "Summer Magic" (Original Karaoke))
4. Sonyuka「Kaeru ga Hitotsu Nakya」(Original Karaoke) (挿入歌「カエルが一つなきゃ」（オリジナルカラオケ） BGM "If a Frog Cries Once" (Original Karaoke))

=== Ojamajo BAN^{2} CD Club Part 4: Ojamajo Pajama Music Talk!! ===
This CD features vocalized songs and extra background music, along with tracks of the main characters talking about their past adventures and summer vacation. It was produced by Marvelous Entertainment, Inc., and distributed by Vap, Inc., on 22 August 2001.

Staff

- Artists: Funky Y.K. [19]; Mayumi Gojou [9]; MAHO-Dou [2,4-6,21]; Saeko Shuu [15]
- Composers: Choku Asada (浅田直) [4]; Takeshi Ike [5,6,9,21]; Yasuo Kosuge [2,19]; Banchou Mehara (芽原万超) [15]; Keiichi Oku [1,8,11-14,17]
- Arrangers: Masahiro Kawasaki (川崎真弘) [15]; MANTA [19]; Kazuo Nobuta [9,21]; Keiichi Oku [1,8,11-14,17]; Masayuki Sakamoto [4-6]; Ayumi Yasui [2]
- Lyricists: Yasuo Kosuge [19]; Midori Kuriyama [9]; Sachiko Oomori (大森祥子) [4,6,15]; Reo Satonozoka [2]; Misuke Yunoki (柚木美祐) [5,21]

Cast [2,7,10,16,18,20]

- Momoko Asuka (Nami Miyahara)
- Hazuki Fujiwara (Tomoko Akiya)
- Doremi Harukaze (Chiemi Chiba)
- Onpu Segawa (Rumi Shishido)
- Aiko Senoo (Yuki Matsuoka)

Tracks

1. Opening (Long Version) (オープニング（Long Version）)
2. Ojamajo de BAN^{2} (おジャ魔女でBAN^{2} Ojamajo BAN BAN)
3. Ojamajo Talk Sono 1 (おジャ魔女トーク その1 Ojamajo Talk Part 1)
4. Nichiyoubi wa Mahou no Ko (日曜日は魔法のコ Sunday is Magic's Child)
5. Onnanoko wa Benkyoujuu! (女の子は勉強中！ The Girl is Studying!)
6. Ojamajo Carnival!! (おジャ魔女カーニバル！！)
7. Ojamajo Talk Sono 2 (おジャ魔女トーク その2 Ojamajo Talk Part 2)
8. Mayuri no Ai no Theme (Gekijou You BGM) (「魔百合の愛のテーマ」（劇場用BGM） Mayuri's Love Theme (BGM for Theater))
9. Kaeru ga Hitotsu Nakya (Gekijou Version) (カエルが一つなきゃ（劇場 Version） If a Frog Cries Once (Theater Version))
10. Ojamajo Talk Sono 3 (おジャ魔女トーク その3 Ojamajo Talk Part 3)
11. Tooi Omoide (TV BGM) (遠い想い出 （TV BGM） Distant Memories (TV BGM))
12. Happy na Nakama-tachi (TV BGM) (ハッピーな仲間たち（TV BGM） Happy Friends (TV BGM))
13. Hogaraka Cooking (TV BGM) (ほがらかクッキング（TV BGM） Cheerful Cooking (TV BGM))
14. Tondemo! Spectacle!! (とんでも！スペクタクル！！（TV BGM） Unbelievable! Spectacle!! (TV BGM))
15. Kitto Ashita wa (きっと明日は Certainly Tomorrow)
16. Ojamajo Talk Sono 4 (おジャ魔女トーク その4 Ojamajo Talk Part 4)
17. Erika no Piano Solo (えりかのピアノソロ Erika's Piano Solo)
18. Ojamajo Talk Sono 5 (おジャ魔女トーク その5 Ojamajo Talk Part 5)
19. Namida no Broken♥Heart (涙のブロークン♥ハート Tears of a Broken♥Heart)
20. Ojamajo Talk Sono 6 (おジャ魔女トーク その6 Ojamajo Talk Part 6)
21. Natsu no Mahō (夏のまほう Summer Magic)

=== Ojamajo BAN^{2} CD Club Part 5: Character Mini Album Series 1 - Doremi Harukaze ===
This CD contains Doremi's image songs, her version of "Sweet Song ABC," and a seven-minute drama with Doremi attempting to prescribe her magical problem-solving cookies to her classmates. It was produced by Marvelous Entertainment, Inc., and distributed by Vap, Inc., on 22 August 2001.

Staff

- Artist: Doremi Harukaze (Chiemi Chiba)
- Composers: HULK [1,5]; Keiichi Oku [3,4,6,7]
- Arrangers: HULK [1,5]; Keiichi Oku [3,4,6,7]
- Lyricists: Yumi Kageyama (影山由美) [6,7 (original draft)]; Sachiko Oomori (大森祥子) [1,3-5]; Misuke Yunoki [6,7]
- Director: Takuya Igarashi [2]
- Scriptwriter: Akatsuki Yamatoya [2]

Cast

- Doremi Harukaze (Chiemi Chiba)
- Momoko Asuka / Masaru Yada (Nami Miyahara)
- Takeshi Hasebe (Mayumi Yamaguchi)
- Reika Tamaki (Ai Nagano)
- Masato Rinno (Junko Takeuchi)
- Seki-sensei (Nanaho Katsuragi)

Tracks

1. 「Su」 no Tsuku Koibito (「ス」のつく恋人 "Su"'s Sweetheart)
2. Doremi no Gakkyū Nisshi 「Doremi no Shohousen」 (どれみの学級日誌「どれみの処方箋」 Doremi's Daily Class Records "Doremi's Prescription")
3. Kitto Chanto Onnanoko (きっとちゃんと女の子 Certainly a Perfect Girl)
4. Otome wa Kyu ni Tomarenai (乙女は急に止まれない Maiden, Don't Stop Abruptly)
5. 「Su」 no Tsuku Koibito (Original Karaoke) (「ス」のつく恋人（オリギナルカラオケ） "Su"'s Sweetheart (Original Karaoke))
6. Doremi no Sweet Song ABC (どれみのすいーとそんぐABC Doremi's Sweet Song ABC)
7. Sweet Song ABC (Original Karaoke) (すいーとそんぐABC（オリギナルカラオケ）)

=== Ojamajo BAN^{2} CD Club Part 6: Character Mini Album Series 2 - Onpu Segawa ===
This CD contains Onpu's image songs, her version of "Sweet Song ABC," and a seven-minute drama where Class 5-2 searches for Minto's lost Onpu CD. It was produced by Marvelous Entertainment, Inc., and distributed by Vap, Inc., on 21 September 2001.

Staff

- Artist: Onpu Segawa (Rumi Shishido)
- Composers: Choku Asada (浅田直) [1,4]; Keiichi Oku [6]; 石原理酉 [3,5]
- Arrangers: Tadashi Jouden (上田禎) [3,5]; Keiichi Oku [6]; Tomoyuki Taiboku (大木知之) [3,5]; Ayumi Yasui [1,4]
- Lyricists: Minako Aoyaki [1,4]; Yumi Kageyama (影山由美) [6 (original draft)]; Misuke Yunoki [3,5,6]; 石原理酉 [3,5]
- Director: Takuya Igarashi [2]
- Scriptwriter: Yumi Kageyama [2]

Cast

- Onpu Segawa (Rumi Shishido)
- Doremi Harukaze (Chiemi Chiba)
- Hazuki Fujiwara (Tomoko Akiya)
- Aiko Senoo (Yuki Matsuoka)
- Momoko Asuka (Nami Miyahara)
- Minto Wada (Yukiko Hanioka)
- Goji Nakata (Michio Miyashita)
- Masaharu Miyamoto (Haruna Katou)
- Yuji Sagawa (Reiko Fujita)
- Yutaka Oota (Noriko Fujita)
- Jun Sato (Naozumi Takahashi)
- Nishizawa-sensei (Yuka Tokumitsu)

Tracks

1. WE CAN DO!
2. Onpu no Gakkyuu Nisshi 「Hannin wa Dare!?」 (おんぷの学級日誌「犯人は誰！？」 Onpu's Daily Class Records "Who Is the Criminal!?")
3. Polar Star (北極星 ぽーらすたー)
4. WE CAN DO! (Original Karaoke)
5. Polar Star (Original Karaoke) (北極星 ぽーらすたー（オリジナルカラオケ）)
6. Onpu no Sweet Song ABC (おんぷのすいーとそんぐABC Onpu's Sweet Song ABC)

=== Ojamajo BAN^{2} CD Club Part 7: Character Mini Album Series 3 - Momoko Asuka ===
This CD contains Momoko's image songs, her version of "Sweet Song ABC," and a seven-minute drama where she asks Pop about the meaning of bajitōfū. It was produced by Marvelous Entertainment, Inc., and distributed by Vap, Inc., on 24 October 2001.

Staff

- Artist: Momoko Asuka (Nami Miyahara)
- Composers: MANTA [1,4,7]; Yasuo Kosuge [3,5]; Keiichi Oku [6];
- Arrangers: MANTA [1,3-5,7]; Keiichi Oku [6]
- Lyricists: Yumi Kageyama (影山由美) [6 (original draft)]; Sachiko Oomori (大森祥子) [1,4]; Reo Satonotsuka [3,5]; Akatsuki Yamatowa [7]; Misuke Yunoki [6]
- Director: Takuya Igarashi [2]
- Scriptwriter: Akatsuki Yamatoya [2]

Cast

- Momoko Asuka (Nami Miyahara)
- Doremi Harukaze (Chiemi Chiba)
- Hazuki Fujiwara (Tomoko Akiya)
- Pop Harukaze (Sawa Ishige)
- Seki-sensei (Nanaho Katsuragi)

Tracks

1. ARIGATO (Thank You)
2. Momoko no Gakkyuu Nisshi 「Momoko no Nihon Bunka Kenkyūjō」 (ももこの学級日誌「ももこの日本文化研究所」 Momoko's Daily Class Records "Momoko's Institute of Japanese Culture")
3. Nippon Daisuki! (ニッポン 大好き！ I Love Japan!)
4. ARIGATO (Original Karaoke) (Thank You (Original Karaoke))
5. Nippon Daisuki! (Original Karaoke) (ニッポン 大好き！（オリジナルカラオケ） I Love Japan! (Original Karaoke))
6. Momoko no Sweet Song ABC (ももこのすいーとそんぐABC Momoko's Sweet Song ABC)
7. Sekai wa Love and Peace (世界はラブアンドピース World Love and Peace)

=== Ojamajo BAN^{2} CD Club Part 8: Character Mini Album Series 4 - Aiko Senoo ===
This CD contains Aiko's image songs, her version of "Sweet Song ABC," and a seven-minute drama where she listens to Nobuko's newest work. It was produced by Marvelous Entertainment, Inc., and distributed by Vap, Inc., on 21 November 2001.

Staff

- Artist: Aiko Senoo (Yuki Matsuoka)
- Composers: Keiichi Oku [1,4,6,7]; Susumu Ueda [3,5]
- Arrangers: Keiichi Oku [1,4,6,7]; Susumu Ueda [3,5]
- Lyricists: Yumi Kageyama (影山由美) [6 (original draft)]; Sachiko Oomori (大森祥子) [1,3-5]; Misuke Yunoki [6]
- Director: Takuya Igarashi [2]
- Scriptwriter: Akatsuki Yamatoya [2]

Cast

- Aiko Senoo (Yuki Matsuoka)
- Doremi Harukaze (Chiemi Chiba)
- Hazuki Fujiwara (Tomoko Akiya)
- Onpu Segawa (Rumi Shishido)
- Nobuko Yokokawa (Kyoko Dounowaki)
- Nishizawa-sensei (Yuka Tokumitsu)

Tracks

1. Aiko ni Omakase! (あいこにおまかせ！ Leave It to Aiko!)
2. Aiko no Gakkyuu Nisshi 「Aiko no Onii Coach」 (あいこの学級日誌「あいこの鬼コーチ」 Aiko's Daily Class Records "Aiko's Demon Coach")
3. Yūgure Buranko (夕暮れブランコ Twilight Swing)
4. Paatto Ikou!! (パーっといこう！！ Let's Go All Out!!)
5. Yūgure Buranko (Original Karaoke) (夕暮れブランコ（オリジナルカラオケ） Twilight Swing (Original Karaoke))
6. Aiko no Sweet Song ABC (あいこのすいーとそんぐABC Aiko's Sweet Song ABC)
7. (BGM) Aiko no Theme & Variation (（BGM） あいこのテーマ＆バリエーション (BGM) Aiko's Theme and Variation)

=== Ojamajo BAN^{2} CD Club Part 9: Character Mini Album Series 5 - Hazuki Fujiwara ===
This CD contains Hazuki's image songs, her version of "Sweet Song ABC," and a seven-minute drama about her fear of ghosts during the class' scary story contest. It was produced by Marvelous Entertainment, Inc., and distributed by Vap, Inc., on 21 December 2001.

Staff

- Artist: Hazuki Fujiwara (Tomoko Akiya)
- Composers: Yuki Matsuura [1,4]; Keiichi Oku [2,3,6,7]
- Arrangers: Yuki Matsuura [1,4]; Keiichi Oku [2,3,6,7]
- Lyricists: Yumi Kageyama (影山由美) [6 (original draft)]; Sachiko Oomori (大森祥子) [1,3-5]; Misuke Yunoki [6]
- Director: Takuya Igarashi [2]
- Scriptwriter: Yoshimi Narita [2]

Cast

- Hazuki Fujiwara (Tomoko Akiya)
- Aiko Senoo (Yuki Matsuoka)
- Onpu Segawa (Rumi Shishido)
- Kanae Iida (Haruna Katou)
- Nobuaki Yamauchi (Yoji Ietomi)
- Yuji Sagawa (Reiko Fujita)
- Yutaka Oota (Noriko Fujita)
- Jun Sato (Naozumi Takahashi)
- Nishizawa-sensei (Yuka Tokumitsu)

Tracks

1. Naisho no Housoku (内緒の法則 Secret Principles)
2. Hazuki no Gakkyuu Nisshi 「Hontou ni Atta Kowai Hanashi」 (はづきの学級日誌「本当にあった怖い話」 Hazuki's Daily Class Records "Meeting for Really Scary True Stories")
3. Tsukiyo no Mahou (月夜の魔法 Moonlit Night Magic)
4. Ashita no Watashi (明日の私 Tomorrow's Me)
5. Naisho no Housoku (Original Karaoke) (内緒の法則（オリジナルカラオケ） Secret Principles (Original Karaoke))
6. Hazuki no Sweet Song ABC (はづきのすいーとそんぐABC Hazuki's Sweet Song ABC)
7. (BGM) Hazuki no Theme & Variation (（BGM） はづきのテーマ＆バリエーション (BGM) Hazuki's Theme and Variation)

=== Ojamajo BAN^{2} CD Club Part 10: MAHO-Dou's Ojamajo BAN^{2} Christmas Party!! ===
This CD contains the main cast singing familiar Christmas tunes, along with several tracks of the main characters discussing the upcoming holidays. It was produced by Marvelous Entertainment, Inc., and distributed by Vap, Inc., on 21 November 2001.

Staff

- Artist: MAHO-Dou
- Composers: Gene Autry [6]; Irving Berlin [8]; Tommie Conner [9]; John Frederick Coots [12]; Philip Doddridge [3]; Henry Gillespie [12]; Franz Zaber Gruber [14]; Oakley Haldeman [6]; Yasuo Kosugi [2,16,17,19]; Johnny Marks [13]; Keiichi Oku [11,18]; James S. Pierpont [5]
- Arranger: Keiichi Oku [11,18]; Masayuki Sakamoto [5,6,12-14]; Ayumi Yasui [2,3,8,9,16,17,19]
- Lyricists: Gene Autry [6]; Irving Berlin [8]; Tommie Conner [9]; John Frederick Coots [12]; Philip Doddridge [3]; Henry Gillespie [12]; Oakley Haldeman [6]; Johnny Marks [13]; Josef Mohr [14]; Sachiko Oomori (大森祥子) [2,17]; James S. Pierpont [5]; Reo Satanozuka [16,19]; Misuke Yunoki (柚木美祐) [11,18]
- Translators: Rokurou Akashi (明石六朗) [6]; Takashi Otowa (音羽たかし) [5]; Kenji Sazanami [9]; Kanbe Takao [12]; Kou Yuuki [14]; Unknown [3]

Cast

- Momoko Asuka (Nami Miyahara)
- Hazuki Fujiwara (Tomoko Akiya)
- Doremi Harukaze (Chiemi Chiba)
- Onpu Segawa (Rumi Shishido)
- Aiko Senoo (Yuki Matsuoka)

Tracks

1. Talk 1 (Opening) (トーク(1)<オープニング>)
2. Ojamajo Happy Christmas (おジャ魔女 ハッピークリスマス)
3. Morobito Kozorite (Sanbika 112-ban) (諸人こぞりて(讃美歌112番) Joy to the World (Hymn #112))
4. Talk 2 (トーク2)
5. Jingle Bell (ジングル・ベル Jingle Bells)
6. Santa Claus ga Yattekuru (サンタクロースがやってくる Here Comes Santa Claus)
7. Talk 3 (トーク3)
8. White Christmas (ホワイト・クリスマス)
9. Mama ga Santa ni Kiss wo Shita (ママがサンタにキスをした I Saw Mama Kissing Santa)
10. Talk 4 (トーク4)
11. Oh! Yasai Samba (Oh!ヤサイ・サンバ Oh! Vegetable Samba)
12. Santa ga Machi ni Yattekuru (サンタが街にやってくる Santa Claus is Coming to Town)
13. Aka Hana no Tonakai (赤鼻のトナカイ Rudolph the Red-nosed Reindeer)
14. Kiyoshi Kono Yoru (Sanbika 109-ban) (聖しこの夜(讃美歌109番 Silent Night (Hymn #109))
15. Talk 5 (トーク5)
16. Ojamajo de BAN^{2} [Christmas Remix Version] (おジャ魔女でBAN2 [クリスマス・リミックスヴァージョン] Ojamajo BAN BAN [Christmas Remix Version])
17. Ojamajo Happy Christmas (Original Karaoke) (おジャ魔女 ハッピークリスマス [オリジナル・カラオケ])
18. Oh! Yasai Samba (Original Karaoke) (Oh!ヤサイ・サンバ [オリジナル・カラオケ] Oh! Vegetable Samba (Original Karaoke))
19. Ojamajo de BAN^{2} [Christmas Remix Version] (Original Karaoke) (おジャ魔女でBAN2 [クリスマス・リミックスヴァージョン] [オリジナル・カラオケ] Ojamajo BAN BAN [Christmas Remix Version] (Original Karaoke))

=== Ojamajo BAN^{2} CD Club Part 11: Ojamajo BAN^{2} Curtain Call ===
This CD contains the BGM from the second half of the series, including various insert songs. It was produced by Marvelous Entertainment, Inc., and distributed by Vap, Inc., on 23 January 2002.

Staff

- Artist: MAHO-Dou [1], Mayumi Gouju [5,11], Za Shibatagorō [8], Yui Komuro [14]
- Composers: Yasuo Kosugi [1], Keiichi Oku [2,3,4,6,7,9,10,12,13], Masayuki Sakamoto [5], Choku Asada [8], Miki Matsubara [11], Maki Kayahara [14]
- Arranger: Ayumi Yasui [1,14], Keiichi Oku [2,3,4,6,7,9,10,12,13], Masayuki Sakamoto [5,11], MT-DRIVE [8]
- Lyricists: Reo Satonozuka [1], Misuke Yunoki (柚木美祐) [5,11], Minako Aoyaki [8], Yui Komuro [14]

Tracks

1. Ojamajo de BAN^{2} (TV Size) (おジャ魔女でBAN^{2}（TVサイズ） Ojamajo BAN BAN (TV Size))
2. Fushigi no Hajimari (不思議のはじまり A Mysterious Beginning)
3. Nigiyaka MAHO-Dou (にぎやかMAHO堂 The Bustling Maho-Dou)
4. Kakemeguru Tsuioku (かけめぐる追憶 Recollections Running About)
5. 10-byou Kazoete (10秒数えて Count 10 Seconds)
6. Atsumare, Koseiha! (集まれ、個性派！ Gather Around, Characters!)
7. Furueru Kokoro (ふるえる心 Shaking Heart)
8. Gokigen Yoroshiku!! (ゴキゲンよろしく！！ Nice to Meet You!!)
9. Haruka Kanata no Juunin (はるか彼方の住人 Distant Resident)
10. Ojamajo Suspense (おジャ魔女サスペンス)
11. Pirikapiri♥Lucky! (ピリカピリ♥ラッキー！)
12. Namida wo Koraete (涙をこらえて Hold Back Your Tears)
13. Kyou ni Sayonara (今日にサヨウナラ Goodbye to Today)
14. Takaramono (TV Size) (たからもの（TVサイズ） Treasures (TV Size))

=== Mo~tto! Ojamajo Doremi Memorial CD Box ===
This four-disc compilation consists of all vocal, image, background, and audio drama tracks of the series. It was produced and distributed by Marvelous Entertainment, Inc., on 25 September 2003. It was re-released in a new set on 22 October 2004.

DISC 1

1. Opening (オープニング)
2. Shiawase Kibun wo Meshiagare (幸せ気分を召し上がれ Eating a Lucky Feeling)
3. America Gaeri no Majo Minarai (アメリカ帰りの魔女見習い The American Witch Apprentice)
4. Ukiuki♪ Mahou Time (ウキウキ♪魔法タイム Cheerful♪ Magic Time)
5. Atsumare! Ojamajo Ko (集まれ！おジャ魔女娘 Meeting! Ojamajo Children)
6. Aratanaru Shiren 「Genrouin no Theme」~「Ojamajo de BAN^{2}」Arrange-kyoku~「Magical Stage」 (新たなる試練「元老院のテーマ」～「おジャ魔女でBAN2」アレンジ曲～「マジカルステージ」 New Trials "Senate Theme" ~ "Ojamajo BAN BAN" Arrangement ~ "Magical Stage")
7. Mo~tto! Suteki na Ashita ni 「Takaramono」Arrange-kyoku ~「Ojamajo de BAN^{2}」Arrange-kyoku (も～っと！素敵な明日に「たからもの」アレンジ曲～「おジャ魔女でBAN2」アレンジ曲 More! Wonderful Tomorrow "Treasures" Arrangement ~ "Ojamajo BAN BAN" Arrangement)
8. Ogenki Shirushi wa Sanjumaru! (お元気印は三重丸！ Very Good Marks of Energy!)
9. Kokoro to Kokoro no Harukaze Mayou (心と心の春風もよう Heart to Heart in the Spring Wind)
10. Ganbarimasu~!! (Original Karaoke) (ガンバリマス～ッ！！(オリジナルカラオケ) Try Your Best!! (Original Karaoke))
11. Kyou Kara Tomodachi (Original Karaoke) (今日から友達(オリジナルカラオケ) Friend Starting Today (Original Karaoke))
12. Miracle☆Power (Original Karaoke) (ミラクル☆パワー(オリジナルカラオケ))
13. caramel (Original Karaoke) (caramel-キャラメル-(オリジナルカラオケ))
14. Honjama Ojamajo Daishuugou!! (Original Karaoke) (ほんじゃまおジャ魔女大集合！！(オリジナルカラオケ) Then, Great Ojamajo Gathering!! (Original Karaoke))
15. Owaranai Monogatari (Original Karaoke) (終わらない物語(オリジナルカラオケ) Never-Ending Story (Original Karaoke))
16. Swe~et Song ABC (Original Karaoke) (すい～とそんぐABC(オリジナルカラオケ))

DISC 2

1. Ojamajo de BAN^{2} (おジャ魔女でBAN^{2} Ojamajo BAN BAN)
2. Ganbarimasu~!! (ガンバリマス～ッ！！ Try Your Best!!)
3. Swe~et Song ABC (すい～とそんぐABC)
4. Kyou Kara Tomodachi (今日から友達 Friend Starting Today)
5. Miracle☆Power (ミラクル☆パワー)
6. caramel (caramel-キャラメル-)
7. Honjama Ojamajo Daishuugou!! (ほんじゃまおジャ魔女大集合！！ Then, Great Ojamajo Gathering!!)
8. Owaranai Monogatari (終わらない物語 Never-Ending Story)
9. Takaramono (たからもの Treasures)
10. Ojamajo Carnival!! (+2 Version) (おジャ魔女カーニバル！！(+2 Version))
11. Pirikapiri♥Lucky! (MAHO-Dou Version) (ピリカピリ♥ラッキー!(MAHO堂 Version))
12. Ojamajo wa Koko ni Iru (+1 Version) (おジャ魔女はココにいる(+1 Version) The Ojamajo Are Here (+1 Version))
13. Lupinus no Komoriuta (+1 Version) (ルピナスの子守唄(+1 Version) Lullaby of the Lupines (+1 Version))
14. Doremi no Sweet Song ABC (どれみのすいーとそんぐABC Doremi's Sweet Song ABC)
15. Onpu no Sweet Song ABC (おんぷのすいーとそんぐABC Onpu's Sweet Song ABC)
16. Momoko no Sweet Song ABC (ももこのすいーとそんぐABC Momoko's Sweet Song ABC)
17. Aiko no Sweet Song ABC (あいこのすいーとそんぐABC Aiko's Sweet Song ABC)
18. Hazuki no Sweet Song ABC (はづきのすいーとそんぐABC Hazuki's Sweet Song ABC)

DISC 3

1. Opening (Long Version) (オープニング(Long Version))
2. Ojamajo Talk Sono 1 (おジャ魔女トーク その1 Ojamajo Talk Part 1)
3. Happy na Nakama-tachi (TV BGM) (ハッピーな仲間たち(TV BGM) Happy Friends (TV BGM))
4. Ojamajo Talk Sono 2 (おジャ魔女トーク その2 Ojamajo Talk Part 2)
5. Tooi Omoide (TV BGM) (遠い想い出 (TV BGM) Distant Memories (TV BGM))
6. Ojamajo Talk Sono 3 (おジャ魔女トーク その3 Ojamajo Talk Part 3)
7. Hogaraka Cooking (TV BGM) (ほがらかクッキング(TV BGM) Cheerful Cooking (TV BGM))
8. Ojamajo Talk Sono 4 (おジャ魔女トーク その4 Ojamajo Talk Part 4)
9. Erika no Piano Solo (えりかのピアノソロ Erika's Piano Solo)
10. Ojamajo Talk Sono 5 (おジャ魔女トーク その5 Ojamajo Talk Part 5)
11. Tondemo! Spectacle!! (とんでも！スペクタクル！！(TV BGM) Unbelievable! Spectacle!! (TV BGM))
12. Ojamajo Talk Sono 6 (おジャ魔女トーク その6 Ojamajo Talk Part 6)
13. Doremi no Gakkyuu Nisshi 「Doremi no Shohousen」 (どれみの学級日誌「どれみの処方箋」 Doremi's Daily Class Records "Doremi's Prescription")
14. Onpu no Gakkyuu Nisshi 「Hannin wa Dare!?」 (おんぷの学級日誌「犯人は誰！？」 Onpu's Daily Class Records "Who Is the Criminal!?")
15. Momoko no Gakkyuu Nisshi 「Momoko no Nihon Bunka Kenkyūjō」 (ももこの学級日誌「ももこの日本文化研究所」 Momoko's Daily Class Records "Momoko's Institute of Japanese Culture")
16. Aiko no Gakkyuu Nisshi 「Aiko no Onii Coach」 (あいこの学級日誌「あいこの鬼コーチ」 Aiko's Daily Class Records "Aiko's Demon Coach")
17. Hazuki no Gakkyuu Nisshi 「Hontou ni Atta Kowai Hanashi」 (はづきの学級日誌「本当にあった怖い話」 Hazuki's Daily Class Records "Meeting for Really Scary True Stories")

DISC 4

1. 「Su」 no Tsuku Koibito (「ス」のつく恋人 "Su"'s Sweetheart)
2. WE CAN DO!
3. Polar Star (北極星 ぽーらすたー)
4. ARIGATO (Thank You)
5. Nippon Daisuki! (ニッポン 大好き！ I Love Japan!)
6. Sekai wa Love and Peace (世界はラブアンドピース World Love and Peace)
7. Yūgure Buranko (夕暮れブランコ Twilight Swing)
8. Naisho no Housoku (内緒の法則 Secret Principles)
9. Talk 1 (Opening) (トーク(1)<オープニング>)
10. Ojamajo Happy Christmas (おジャ魔女 ハッピークリスマス)
11. Morobito Kozorite (Sanbika 112-ban) (諸人こぞりて(讃美歌112番) Joy to the World (Hymn #112))
12. Talk 2 (トーク2)
13. Jingle Bell (ジングル・ベル Jingle Bells)
14. Santa Claus ga Yattekuru (サンタクロースがやってくる Here Comes Santa Claus)
15. Talk 3 (トーク3)
16. White Christmas (ホワイト・クリスマス)
17. Mama ga Santa ni Kiss wo Shita (ママがサンタにキスをした I Saw Mama Kissing Santa)
18. Talk 4 (トーク4)
19. Oh! Yasai Samba (Oh!ヤサイ・サンバ Oh! Vegetable Samba)
20. Talk 5 (トーク5)
21. Ojamajo de BAN^{2} [Christmas Remix Version] (おジャ魔女でBAN2 [クリスマス・リミックスヴァージョン] Ojamajo BAN BAN [Christmas Remix Version])
22. Takaramono (Instrumental Version) (「たからもの」(インストゥルメンタル・ヴァージョン) Treasures (Instrumental Version))
23. Ojamajo de BAN^{2} (Instrumental Version) (「おジャ魔女でBAN2」(インストゥルメンタル・ヴァージョン) Ojamajo BAN BAN (Instrumental Version))
24. Takaramono (TV Size) (たからもの(TVサイズ) Treasures (TV Size))
25. Ojamajo de BAN^{2} (TV Size) (おジャ魔女でBAN^{2}(TVサイズ) Ojamajo BAN BAN (TV Size))

== Ojamajo Doremi DOKKA~N! ==
=== Dance! Ojamajo ===
This CD contains the full version of the opening and ending themes of the series, along with karaoke versions. It was produced by Marvelous Entertainment, Inc., and distributed by Vap, Inc., on 21 February 2002. Ikue Ootani, voice actress of Hana Makihatayama, joins MAHO-Dou, beginning with this CD.

Staff

- Artists: MAHO-Dou [1]; Masami Nakatsukasa [2]
- Composers: Yasuo Kosuge [1,3]; Yasuno Satou (佐藤恭野) [2,4]
- Arrangers: Kazuo Nobuta [2,4]; Norimasa Sanchuu [1,3]
- Lyricists: Sakura Hikawa [2,4]; Chiyoko Mori [1,3]

Tracks

1. DANCE! Ojamajo (DANCE! おジャ魔女)
2. Watashi no Tsubasa (わたしのつばさ My Wings)
3. DANCE! Ojamajo (Original Karaoke) (DANCE! おジャ魔女（オリジナルカラオケ）)
4. Watashi no Tsubasa (Original Karaoke) (わたしのつばさ（オリジナルカラオケ） My Wings (Original Karaoke))

=== Ojamajo DOKKA~N! CD Club Volume 1: Character Mini Album Special - Hana Makihatayama (Hana-chan) ===
This CD contains Hana's image songs and talk segments. It was produced by Marvelous Entertainment, Inc., and distributed by Vap, Inc., on 24 April 2002.

Staff

- Artist: Hana-chan (Ikue Ootani)
- Composers: Rie Hamada [4,6,9,10]; Kousuke Kanai (金井江右) [2,8]
- Arrangers: Kousuke Kanai (金井江右) [2,8]; Jouji Nakahata (中畑丈治) [4,6,9,10]
- Lyricists: Nozomi Inoue [2,4,8,9]; Chiyoko Mori [6,10]

Cast [1,3,5,7]

- Doremi Harukaze (Chiemi Chiba)
- Hana-chan (Ikue Ootani)
- Hazuki Fujiwara (Tomoko Akiya)
- Aiko Senoo (Yuki Matsuoka)
- Onpu Segawa (Rumi Shishido)
- Momoko Asuka (Nami Miyahara)
- Pop Harukaze (Sawa Ishige)

Tracks

1. Opening - Hana-chan no Goaisatsu (オープニング・ハナちゃんのごあいさつ Opening - Hana-chan's Greeting)
2. Watashi wa Ojamajo Hana-chan!! (わたしはおジャ魔女ハナちゃん！！ I Am Ojamajo Hana-chan!!)
3. Talk 1 - Hana-chan no Toaru Ichinichi (Yoru-hen) (トーク(1)ハナちゃんのとある一日（夜編） Talk 1 - A Particular Day of Hana-chan (Evening Part))
4. Daisuki na Ehon to Mama no Uta (だいすきな絵本とママのうた I Love the Picture Book and Mama's Song)
5. Talk 2 - Hana-chan no Toaru Ichinichi (Asa-hen) (トーク(2)ハナちゃんのとある一日（朝編） Talk 2 - A Particular Day of Hana-chan (Morning Part))
6. Damon ne! Hana-chan (だもんね！ハナちゃん)
7. Ending - Oshimai! (エンディング・おしまい！ Ending - The End!)
8. Watashi wa Ojamajo Hana-chan!! (Original Karaoke) (わたしはおジャ魔女ハナちゃん！！（オリジナルカラオケ） I Am Ojamajo Hana-chan!! (Original Karaoke))
9. Daisuki na Ehon to Mama no Uta (Original Karaoke) (だいすきな絵本とママのうた（オリジナルカラオケ） I Love the Picture Book and Mama's Song (Original Karaoke))
10. Damon ne! Hana-chan (Original Karaoke) (だもんね！ハナちゃん（オリジナルカラオケ）)

=== Ojamajo Ondo de Happy-py!! ===
This CD contains the full version of the second ending theme of the series, along with a new song. It was produced by Marvelous Entertainment, Inc., and distributed by Vap, Inc., on 12 June 2002.

Staff

- Artist: MAHO-Dou
- Composers: Yasuo Kosuge [1,3]; Keiichi Oku [2,4]
- Arrangers: Keiichi Oku [2,4]; Susumu Ueda [1,3]
- Lyricists: Sachiko Oomori (大森祥子) [2,4]; Anzu Takeyori [1,3]

Tracks

1. Ojamajo Ondo de Happy-py!! (おジャ魔女音頭でハッピッピ！！ Happy-py Ojamajo Work Song!!)
2. MAHO de Cha-cha-cha (MAHOでチャチャチャ MAHO Cha-cha-cha)
3. Ojamajo Ondo de Happy-py!! (Original Karaoke) (おジャ魔女音頭でハッピッピ！！（オリジナルカラオケ） Happy-py Ojamajo Work Song!! (Original Karaoke))
4. MAHO de Cha-cha-cha (Original Karaoke) (MAHOでチャチャチャ（オリジナルカラオケ） MAHO Cha-cha-cha (Original Karaoke))

=== Ojamajo DOKKA~N! CD Club Volume 2: Ojamajo DOKKA~N! Song Library!! ===
This CD contains theme and insert vocal songs from the series. It was produced by Marvelous Entertainment, Inc., and distributed by Vap, Inc., on 21 June 2002.

Staff

- Artists: Mayumi Gojou [3,10]; Candy Itou (Miwa Matsumoto) [8]; MAHO-Dou [1,2,4,7,9]; Yuki Matsuura [5]; Masami Nakatsukasa [6,11,12]
- Composers: Jiki Asada (浅田直) [10] Yasuo Kosuge [1,2,4,8,11,14,15]; Saburou Makino [9,13]; Yuki Matsuura [5]; Keiichi Oku [7]; Michihiko Oota [6]; Yasuno Satou [12]; Yoshihide Tsuge [3]
- Arrangers: HULK [4,11,15]; Seiichi Kakehashi (掛橋誠一) [3]; Saburou Makino [9,13]; Yuki Matsuura [5]; Kazuo Nobuta [12]; Keiichi Oku [7]; Norimasa Sanchuu [1]; Susumu Ueda [2]; Ayumi Yasui [6,8,10,14]
- Lyricists: Sakura Hikawa [12]; Nagae Kuwabara [4,9,13,15]; Yuki Matsuura [5]; Chiyoko Mori [1]; Sachiko Oomori (大森祥子) [7,10]; Anzu Takeyori [2]; Hiroshi Yamada [6]; Akatsuki Yamatoya [8,14]; Misuke Yunoki [3,11]

Tracks

1. DANCE! Ojamajo (DANCE! おジャ魔女)
2. Ojamajo Ondo de Happy-py!! (おジャ魔女音頭でハッピッピ！！ Happy-py Ojamajo Work Song!!)
3. Ojamajo is No. 1! (おジャ魔女 is No. 1!)
4. DOKKA~N! Party Time!! (ドッカ～ン！パーティータイム！！)
5. Egao no Mirai he... (笑顔の未来へ... Toward a Smiling Future...)
6. Katamusubi (かたむすび Half-knot)
7. MAHO de Cha-cha-cha (MAHOでチャチャチャ MAHO Cha-cha-cha)
8. Fukazume Fighter ~ Candy Itou no Theme (深爪ファイター～キャンディ伊藤のテーマ Extremely Short-Nailed Fighter ~ Candy Itou's Theme)
9. Soreyuke! Majoranger (それゆけ！マジョレンジャー Let's Go! Majoranger)
10. Kiai Ippatsu Kimechae Otome! (気合い一発キメちゃえ乙女！ One Spirit to Win the Maiden!)
11. Zutto Friend (ずっとFriend Always a Friend)
12. Watashi no Tsubasa (わたしのつばさ My Wings)
13. Soreyuke! Majoranger (Original Karaoke) (それゆけ！マジョレンジャー（オリジナルカラオケ） Let's Go! Majoranger (Original Karaoke))
14. Fukazume Fighter ~ Candy Itou no Theme (Original Karaoke) (深爪ファイター～キャンディ伊藤のテーマ（オリジナルカラオケ） Extremely Short-Nailed Fighter ~ Candy Itou's Theme (Original Karaoke))
15. DOKKA~N! Party Time!! (Original Karaoke) (ドッカ～ン！パーティータイム！！（オリジナルカラオケ）)

=== Ojamajo DOKKA~N! CD Club Volume 3: Ojamajo Musical Collection DOKKA~N! ~Ojamajo Close Call! Save the World of Music!~ ===
This CD also contains vocal songs, along with some previous character image songs. It was produced by Marvelous Entertainment, Inc., and distributed by Vap, Inc., on 24 July 2002.

- NOTE: "Pirikapiri♥Lucky! (MAHO-Dou Version)" is the original MAHO-Dou Version from "Ojamajo BAN^{2} CD Club Part 3: Ojamajo Musical Vocal Collection." Hence, Hana is excluded. Also, "MAHO de Cha-cha-cha (-2 Version)" does not include Momoko and Hana as singers, and "Watashi no Tsubasa (Actor Song Version)" uses all the voice actors.

Staff

- Artists: Momoko Asuka (Nami Miyahara) [7]; Enka (Masami Kikuchi) [4,12]; Hana-chan (Ikue Ootani) [5]; MAHO-Dou [1,3,6,9,11]; Onpu Segawa (Rumi Shishido) [8]; Tachyon (Hiroki Takahashi) [2]; Fright (Naozumi Takahashi) [2]
- Composers: Jiki Asada (浅田 直) [8]; Kousuke Kanai (金井江右) [5]; Yasuo Kosuge [1,9,11]; MANTA [7]; Miki Matsubara [3]; Keiichi Oku [2,6]; Yasuno Satou (佐藤恭野) [10]; Susumu Ueda [4,12,13]
- Arrangers: Kousuke Kanai (金井江右) [5]; MANTA [7]; Kazuo Nobuta [10]; Keiichi Oku [6]; Masayuki Sakamoto [2,3]; Norimasa Sanchuu [1,11]; Susumu Ueda [4,9,12,13]; Ayumi Yasui [8]
- Lyricists: Minako Aoyagi [8]; Sakura Hikawa [10]; Nozomi Inoue [5]; Chiyoko Mori [1,4,11-13]; Sachiko Oomori (大森祥子) [6]; Reo Satonozuka [2]; Anzu Takeyori [9]; Akatsuki Yamatoya [7]; Misuke Yunoki [3]
- Director: Issei Nishida
- Scriptwriter: Akatsuki Yamatoya, Issei Nishida

Cast

- Doremi Harukaze (Chiemi Chiba)
- Hazuki Fujiwara (Tomoko Akiya)
- Aiko Senoo (Yuki Matsuoka)
- Onpu Segawa (Rumi Shishido)
- Momoko Asuka (Nami Miyahara)
- Hana-chan (Ikue Ootani)
- Oyajiide (Nobuaki Kanemitsu)
- Fright (Hiroki Takahashi)
- Tachyon (Naozumi Takahashi)
- Majo Tango (Masako Katsuki)
- Karaoke (Asako Dodo)
- Enka (Masami Kikuchi)

Tracks

1. DANCE! Ojamajo (DANCE! おジャ魔女)
2. Omae ni Rock You! (おまえに！Rock You We Rock You!)
3. Pirikapiri♥Lucky! (MAHO-Dou Version) (ピリカピリ♥ラッキー!（MAHO堂 Version）)
4. Anata Oikake Jinsei Minato (Karaoke Echo Version) (あなた追いかけ人生港（カラオケエコー・バージョン） Harbor of Life Where I Came Chasing You (Karaoke Echo Version))
5. Watashi wa Ojamajo Hana-chan!! (わたしはおジャ魔女ハナちゃん！！ I Am Ojamajo Hana-chan!!)
6. MAHO de Cha-cha-cha (-2 Version) (MAHOでチャチャチャ（-2バージョン） MAHO Cha-cha-cha (-2 Version))
7. Sekai wa Love and Peace (世界はラブアンドピース World Love and Peace）
8. WE CAN DO
9. Ojamajo Ondo de Happy-py!! (おジャ魔女音頭でハッピッピ！！ Happy-py Ojamajo Work Song!!)
10. Watashi no Tsubasa (Shutsuensha Kashou Version) (わたしのつばさ（出演者歌唱バージョン） My Wings (Actors Singing Version))
11. <Curtain Call> DANCE! Ojamajo (TV Size) (<カーテンコール> DANCE! おジャ魔女（TVサイズ）)
12. Anata Oikake Jinsei Minato (Full Version) (あなた追いかけ人生港（フルバージョン） Harbor of Life Where I Came Chasing You (Full Version))
13. Anata Oikake Jinsei Minato (Original Karaoke) (あなた追いかけ人生港（オリジナルカラオケ） Harbor of Life Where I Came Chasing You (Original Karaoke))

=== Ojamajo DOKKA~N! CD Club Volume 4: Ojamajo DOKKA~N! BGM Collection Plus Alpha ===
This CD contains background music used in the second half of the series and new arrangements of old songs. It was produced by Marvelous Entertainment, Inc., and distributed by Vap, Inc., on 21 August 2002.

Staff

- Artists: MAHO-Dou [2,6]; Masami Nakatsukasa [12]
- Composers: Jiki Asada (浅田 直) [19]; Nozomi Inoue [18]; Yasuo Kosuge [2,6,13,15,17,20]; Yuki Matsuura [16]; Keiichi Oku [1,3-5,7,8,10,11]; Yasuno Satō (佐藤恭野) [12,14,21]; Eri Takeda [9]
- Arrangers: HULK [20]; Kazuo Nobuta [12,14,21]; Keiichi Oku [1,3-5,7,8,10,11]; Sachiko Oomori (大森俊之) [9]; Masayuki Sakamoto [16]; Norimasa Sanchuu [2,13,15]; Susumu Ueda [6]; Ayumi Yasui [17-19]
- Lyricists: Shiho Aiyoshi (相吉志保) [9]; Sakura Hikawa [12,14,21]; Nozomi Inoue [18]; Yuki Matsuura [16]; Chiyoko Mori [2,13,15]; Sachiko Oomori (大森祥子) [19]; Reo Satonozuka [17]; Anzu Takeyori [6]; Misuke Yunoki [20]

Tracks

1. Avant Title (アバンタイトル)
2. DANCE! Ojamajo (TV Size) (DANCE! おジャ魔女（TVサイズ）)
3. Oshare ZAKKA wa MAHO-Dou♪ (おしゃれZAKKAはMAHO堂♪ Stylish GOODS at the MAHO-Dou♪)
4. Nemureru Mori no Senzen-dai no Joou-sama (眠れる森の先々代の女王様 The Sleeping Queen Before Last)
5. Kokoro Yureru, Fuan (心揺れる、不安 Shaking Heart, Anxiety)
6. Ojamajo Ondo de Happy-py!! (TV Size) (おジャ魔女音頭でハッピッピ！！（TVサイズ） Happy-py Ojamajo Work Song!! (TV Size))
7. Ojamajo DOKKA~N! to, Seizoroi! (おジャ魔女ドッカ～ン！と、勢ぞろい！ Full Array of Ojamajo DOKKA~N!)
8. Dance de Pao-chan (だんすdeパオちゃん Pao-chan Dance)
9. Lupinus no Komoriuta (Accordion Version) (ルピナスの子守唄（アコーディオンVersion） Lullaby of the Lupines (Accordion Version))
10. Kandou Climax (感動くらいまっくす Climactic Sensation)
11. Jikaiyokoku ("DANCE! Ojamajo" Arenji-kyoku) (次回予告（「DANCE! おジャ魔女」アレンジ曲） Preview ("DANCE! Ojamajo" Arrangement))
12. Watashi no Tsubasa (TV Size) (わたしのつばさ（TVサイズ） My Wings (TV Size))
13. DANCE! Ojamajo (Accordion Version) (DANCE! おジャ魔女（アコーディオンVersion）)
14. Watashi no Tsubasa (Accordion Version) (わたしのつばさ（アコーディオンVersion） My Wings (Accordion Version))
15. DANCE! Ojamajo (Instrumental Version) (DANCE! おジャ魔女（インストゥルメンタルVersion）)
16. caramel (Original Karaoke) (caramel-キャラメル-（オリジナルカラオケ）)
17. Honjama Ojamajo Daishuugou!! (Original Karaoke) (ほんじゃまおジャ魔女大集合！！（オリジナルカラオケ） Then, Great Ojamajo Gathering!! (Original Karaoke))
18. Owaranai Monogatari (Original Karaoke) (終わらない物語（オリジナルカラオケ） Never-Ending Story (Original Karaoke))
19. Kiai Ippatsu Kimechae Otome! (Original Karaoke) (気合い一発キメちゃえ乙女！（オリジナルカラオケ） One Spirit to Win the Maiden! (Original Karaoke))
20. Zutto Friend (Original Karaoke) (ずっとFriend（オリジナルカラオケ） Always a Friend (Original Karaoke))
21. Watashi no Tsubasa (Instrumental Version) (わたしのつばさ（インストゥルメンタルVersion） My Wings (Instrumental Version))

=== Ojamajo DOKKA~N! CD Club Volume 5: Character Vocal Collection (Class 6-1) ===
This CD contains image songs and their karaoke counterparts for select members of Class 6–1. In between tracks, the main characters discuss the singers. It was produced by Marvelous Entertainment, Inc., and distributed by Vap, Inc., on 21 October 2002.

Staff

- Artists: Kyoko Dounowaki & Oma Ichimura [4]; Nanaho Katsuragi [14]; Chizuru Matsuyuki (茉雪千鶴) [9]; Fuuko Misaki [7]; Ai Nagano & Shihomi Mizowaki [2]; Junko Takeuchi [12]; Naozumi Takahashi [5]; Kumiko Yokote [11]
- Composers: HULK [2,15]; Kousuke Kanai (金井江右) [4,14,16,20]; Yasuo Kosugi [5,7,9,17]; Ayumi Yasui [11,12,18,19]
- Arrangers: HULK [2,15]; MANTA [5]; Susumu Ueda [4,7,14,16,17,20]; Ayumi Yasui [9,11,12,18,19]
- Lyricists: Yumi Kageyama (影山由美) [2,15]; Yasou Kosugi [5]; Midori Kuriyama [7,11,12,14,17-20]; Akatsuki Yamatoya [4,9,16]

Cast [1,3,6,8,10,13]

- Doremi Harukaze (Chiemi Chiba)
- Hazuki Fujiwara (Tomoko Akiya)
- Aiko Senoo (Yuki Matsuoka)
- Onpu Segawa (Rumi Shishido)
- Momoko Asuka (Nami Miyahara)
- Hana-chan (Ikue Ootani)
- Majorika (Nao Nagasawa)

Tracks

1. Ojamajo Talk 1 (おジャ魔女トーク1)
2. Super Ojou-sama! (Reika Tamaki & Kaori Shimakura) (スーパーお嬢様！（玉木麗香＆島倉かおり） Super Mistress!)
3. Ojamajo Talk 2 (おジャ魔女トーク2)
4. Katsuji•Manga•Kokuhaku? (Nobuko Yokokawa & Miho Maruyama) (カツジ・マンガ・コクハク？（横川信子＆丸山みほ） (Printing•Manga•Confession?)
5. Namida no Broken♥Heart (Takurou Hagiwara) (涙のブロークン♥ハート（萩原たくろう） Tears of a Broken♥Heart)
6. Ojamajo Talk 3 (おジャ魔女トーク3)
7. Niji wo Tsukamitai (Kayoko Nagato) (虹をつかみたい（長門かよこ） I Want to Grab the Rainbow)
8. Ojamajo Talk 4 (おジャ魔女トーク4)
9. Fukazume Fighter ~ Candy Itou no Theme (Mutsumi Kudou) (深爪ファイター～キャンディ伊藤のテーマ（工藤むつみ） Extremely Short-Nailed Fighter ~ Candy Itou's Theme)
10. Ojamajo Talk 5 (おジャ魔女トーク5)
11. Ano Ko wo Tsurete World Cup (Tetsuya Kotake) (あの娘を連れてワールドカップ（小竹哲也） Bring That Girl Along to the World Cup)
12. Ago Yori Ai wo Komete (Masato Rinno) (アゴより愛をこめて（林野まさと） Love From Ago)
13. Ojamajo Talk 6 (おジャ魔女トーク6)
14. Midnight Rider (Seki-sensei) (Midnight Rider（関先生）)
15. Super Ojou-sama! (Original Karaoke) (スーパーお嬢様！（オリジナルカラオケ） Super Mistress! (Original Karaoke))
16. Katsuji•Manga•Kokuhaku? (Original Karaoke) (カツジ・マンガ・コクハク？（オリジナルカラオケ） (Printing•Manga•Confession? (Original Karaoke))
17. Niji wo Tsukamitai (Original Karaoke) (虹をつかみたい（オリジナルカラオケ） I Want to Touch the Rainbow (Original Karaoke))
18. Ano Ko wo Tsurete World Cup (Original Karaoke) (あの娘を連れてワールドカップ（オリジナルカラオケ） Bring That Girl Along to the World Cup (Original Karaoke))
19. Ago Yori Ai wo Komete (Original Karaoke) (アゴより愛をこめて（オリジナルカラオケ） Love From Ago (Original Karaoke))
20. Midnight Rider (Original Karaoke) (Midnight Rider（オリジナルカラオケ）)

=== Ojamajo DOKKA~N! CD Club Volume 6: Character Vocal Collection (Class 6-2) ===
This CD contains image songs and their karaoke counterparts for select members of Class 6–2. In between tracks, the main characters discuss the singers. It was produced by Marvelous Entertainment, Inc., and distributed by Vap, Inc., on 21 November 2002.

Staff

- Artists: Noriko Fujita [4]; Reiko Fujita [4]; Oma Ichimura [6]; Youji Ietomi [10]; Reiko Kiuchi [4]; Mamiko Noto [2]; Tomo Saeki [4]; Naozumi Takahashi [4]; Yuka Tokumitsu [12]; Takayo Yumi [8]
- Composers: HULK [10,17]; Nozomi Inoue [2,8,13,16]; Kousuke Kanai (金井江右) [12,18]; Yasuo Kosugi [4,14,19]; Susumu Ueda [6,15]
- Arrangers: HULK [2,8,10,13,16,17]; MANTA [19]; Susumu Ueda [6,15]; Ayumi Yasui [4,12,14,18]
- Lyricists: Yumi Kageyama (影山由美) [8,12,16,18]; Yasuo Kosugi [19]; Yoshimi Narita [2,4,13,14]; Akatsuki Yamatoya [6,10,15,17]

Cast [1,3,5,7,9,11]

- Doremi Harukaze (Chiemi Chiba)
- Hazuki Fujiwara (Tomoko Akiya)
- Aiko Senoo (Yuki Matsuoka)
- Onpu Segawa (Rumi Shishido)
- Momoko Asuka (Nami Miyahara)
- Hana-chan (Ikue Ootani)
- Majorika (Nao Nagasawa)

Tracks

1. Ojamajo Talk 1 (おジャ魔女トーク1)
2. Soft Cream wo Tabenagara (Sachiko Ijuuin) (ソフトクリームを食べながら（伊集院さちこ） Eating with Soft Cream)
3. Ojamajo Talk 2 (おジャ魔女トーク2)
4. Owarai no Michi (SOS Trio vs. Toyoken) (お笑いの道（SOSトリオVSトヨケン） The Way of the Comedy)
5. Ojamajo Talk 3 (おジャ魔女トーク3)
6. Flower Bed (Marina Koizumi) (フラワーベッド（小泉まりな）)
7. Ojamajo Talk 4 (おジャ魔女トーク4)
8. Wasurenai... (Shiori Nakayama) (忘れない...（中山しおり） Don't Forget...)
9. Ojamajo Talk 5 (おジャ魔女トーク5)
10. Butsu Batsu Nice Guy (Nobuaki Yamauchi) (ブツバツナイスガイ（山内信秋）)
11. Ojamajo Talk 6 (おジャ魔女トーク6)
12. Tte Yuuka, Yukka Nano (Nishizawa-sensei) (ってゆーか、優香なの（西沢先生） Or Perhaps I Should Say, Yuuka)
13. Soft Cream wo Tabenagara (Original Karaoke) (ソフトクリームを食べながら（オリジナルカラオケ） Eating with Soft Cream (Original Karaoke))
14. Owarai no Michi (Original Karaoke) (お笑いの道（オリジナルカラオケ） The Way of the Comedy (Original Karaoke))
15. Flower Bed (Original Karaoke) (フラワーベッド（オリジナルカラオケ）)
16. Wasurenai... (Original Karaoke) (忘れない...（オリジナルカラオケ） Don't Forget... (Original Karaoke))
17. Butsu Batsu Nice Guy (Original Karaoke) (ブツバツナイスガイ（オリジナルカラオケ）)
18. Tte Yuuka, Yukka Nano (Original Karaoke) (ってゆーか、優香なの（オリジナルカラオケ） Or Perhaps I Should Say, Yuuka (Original Karaoke))
19. Namida no Broken♥Heart (Original Karaoke) (涙のブロークン♥ハート（オリジナルカラオケ） Tears of a Broken♥Heart (Original Karaoke))

=== Ojamajo DOKKA~N! CD Club Volume 7: Ojamajo DOKKA~N! Drama Theater - MAHO-Dou's Witch World Happy-py Tour!! ===
This drama CD depicts a trip to the Witch World by the Ojamajos. It was produced by Marvelous Entertainment, Inc., and distributed by Vap, Inc., on 21 December 2002.

Staff

- Script: Takashi Yamada
- Music: Keiichi Oku
- Artists: MAHO-Dou [2]; Masami Nakatsukasa [10]

Cast

- Doremi Harukaze (Chiemi Chiba)
- Hazuki Fujiwara (Tomoko Akiya)
- Aiko Senoo (Yuki Matsuoka)
- Onpu Segawa / Roro (Rumi Shishido)
- Momoko Asuka (Nami Miyahara)
- Hana-chan (Ikue Ootani)
- Pao (Mika Kanai)
- Majo Rika (Nao Nagasawa)
- Lala (Megumi Takamura)
- Pop Harukaze / Fafa (Sawa Ishige)
- Dodo / Nishizawa-sensei / Majo Doron (Yuka Tokumitsu)
- Oyajiide (Nobuaki Kanemitsu)
- Mota (Yuuko Kawasaki)
- Motamota (YOKO)
- Majo Heart (Fumie Houjou)
- Hachitarou (Youji Ietomi)
- Surumeko (Kanako Tobimatsu)
- Majo Pon / Teki (Takayo Yumi)
- Majo Pii / Atarimeko (Yukiko Hanioka)
- Majo Rin / Tekipaki (Reiko Kiuchi)
- Queen of the Witch World (Yuka Imai, credited as "?")

Tracks

1. Prologue ~ MAHO-Dou (プロローグ～MAHO堂)
2. DANCE! Ojamajo (TV Size) (DANCE！おジャ魔女（TVサイズ）)
3. Iza Majokai he Shuppaatsu! (いざ魔法界へしゅっぱーつ！ Now, Let's Depart To the Witch World!)
4. Oyajiide no Quiz Corner Sono 1 (オヤジーデのクイズコーナー その1 Oyajiide's Quiz Corner Part 1)
5. Youkoso! Majo Youchien Hen (ようこそ！魔女幼稚園篇 Welcome! Witch Kindergarten Chapter)
6. Majogaeru no Mura he (Intermission) (魔女ガエルの村へ（インターミッション） Village of the Witch Frogs (Intermission))
7. Oyajiide no Quiz Corner Sono 2 (オヤジーデのクイズコーナー その2 Oyajiide's Quiz Corner Part 2)
8. Youkoso! Majokai Hawaiian Center Hen (ようこそ！魔女界ハワイアンセンター篇 Welcome! Witch World Hawaiian Center Chapter)
9. Epilogue (エピローグ)
10. Watashi no Tsubasa (TV Size) (わたしのつばさ（TVサイズ） My Wings (TV Size))
11. Omake Corner - Ojamajo Sanpun Cooking!? (おまけコーナー・おジャ魔女3分クッキング！？ Bonus Corner - Ojamajo Three-Minute Cooking!?)

=== Ojamajo DOKKA~N! CD Club Volume 8: FRIENDS - MAHO-Dou Solo Vocal Album ===
This CD contains songs image songs bidding farewell and looking toward the future. It was produced by Marvelous Entertainment, Inc., and distributed by Vap, Inc., on 22 January 2003.

Staff

- Artists: Momoko Asuka (Nami Miyahara) [6]; Hazuki Fujiwara (Tomoko Akiya) [3]; Doremi Harukaze (Chiemi Chiba) [2]; Hana Makihatayama (Ikue Ootani) [7]; Onpu Segawa (Rumi Shishido) [5]; Aiko Senoo (Yuki Matsuoka) [4]
- Composers: Maki Kayahara (茅原万起) [1]; HULK [2]; Nozomi Inoue [3]; Yasuo Kosugi (小杉保夫) [4]; Takahiro Matsumoto (松本タカヒロ) [5]; Michihiko Oota (太田美知彦) [6]; Kousuke Kanai (金井江右) [7]; Keiichi Oku [8]
- Arrangers: HULK [2]; Kazuo Nobuta (信田かずお) [3]; Ayumi Yasui (安井歩) [4]; Takahiro Matsumoto (松本タカヒロ) [5]; Norimasa Sanchuu (山中紀昌) [6]; Kousuke Kanai (金井江右) [7]
- Lyricists: Chiemi Chiba [2]; Nozomi Inoue [3]; Chiyoko Mori [4]; Yuki Matsuoka [4]; Miyu Yuzuki [5]; Rumi Shishido [5]; Nami Miyahara [6]; Sachiko Oomori [7]
- Chorus Arrangement: ASAKO [4]

Tracks

1. Opening ~ Kitto Ashita wa (Accordion Version) (Opening ～きっと明日は（アコーディオンヴァージョン） Opening ~ Certainly Tomorrow (Accordion Version))
2. Merry-Go-Round (メリーゴーランド)
3. OK!
4. Ao no Kanata he (青のかなたへ The Other Side of Blue)
5. Cherry Bomb!
6. Rainbow
7. Thank You, Mommies (サンキューマミーズ)
8. Ending ~ Friends (Instrumental)
9. Merry-Go-Round (Original Karaoke) (メリーゴーランド（オリジナルカラオケ）)
10. OK! (Original Karaoke)
11. Ao no Kanata he (Original Karaoke) (青のかなたへ（オリジナルカラオケ） The Other Side of Blue (Original Karaoke))
12. Cherry Bomb! (Original Karaoke)
13. Rainbow (Original Karaoke)
14. Thank You, Mommies (Original Karaoke) (サンキューマミーズ（オリジナルカラオケ）)

=== Ojamajo DOKKA~N! Memorial CD Box ===
This four-disc compilation of the show's music was produced by Marvelous Entertainment, Inc., and distributed by Vap, Inc., on 22 October 2003. It was re-released in a new set on 26 January 2005.

DISC 1

1. Avant Title (アバンタイトル)
2. Oshare ZAKKA wa MAHO-Dou♪ (おしゃれZAKKAはMAHO堂♪ Stylish GOODS at the MAHO-Dou♪)
3. Nemureru Mori no Senzen Shiro no Joou-sama (眠れる森の先々代の女王様 The Sleeping Queen Before Last)
4. Kokoro Yureru, Fuan (心揺れる、不安 Shaking Heart, Anxiety)
5. Ojamajo DOKKA~N! to, Seizoroi! (おジャ魔女ドッカ～ン！と、勢ぞろい！ Full Array of Ojamajo DOKKA~N!)
6. Dance de Pao-chan (だんすdeパオちゃん Pao-chan Dance)
7. Kandou Climax (感動くらいまっくす Climactic Sensation)
8. Lupinus no Komoriuta (Accordion Version) (ルピナスの子守唄（アコーディオンVersion） Lullaby of the Lupines (Accordion Version))
9. DANCE! Ojamajo (Accordion Version) (DANCE! おジャ魔女（アコーディオンVersion）)
10. Watashi no Tsubasa (Accordion Version) (わたしのつばさ（アコーディオンVersion） My Wings (Accordion Version))
11. Kitto Ashita wa (Accordion Version) (きっと明日は（アコーディオンヴァージョン） Certainly Tomorrow (Accordion Version))
12. Ojamajo Ondo de Happy-py!! (Original Karaoke) (おジャ魔女音頭でハッピッピ！！（オリジナルカラオケ） Happy-py Ojamajo Work Song!! (Original Karaoke))
13. MAHO de Cha-cha-cha (Original Karaoke) (MAHOでチャチャチャ（オリジナルカラオケ）MAHO Cha-cha-cha (Original Karaoke))
14. DOKKA~N! Party Time!! (Original Karaoke) (ドッカ～ン！パーティータイム！！（オリジナルカラオケ）)
15. Fukazume Fighter ~ Candy Itou no Theme (Original Karaoke) (深爪ファイター～キャンディ伊藤のテーマ（オリジナルカラオケ） Extremely Short-Nailed Fighter ~ Candy Itou's Theme (Original Karaoke))
16. Soreyuke! Majoranger (Original Karaoke) (それゆけ！マジョレンジャー（オリジナルカラオケ） Let's Go! Majoranger (Original Karaoke))
17. Kiai Ippatsu Kimechae Otome! (Original Karaoke) (気合い一発キメちゃえ乙女！（オリジナルカラオケ） One Spirit to Win the Maiden! (Original Karaoke))
18. Zutto Friend (Original Karaoke) (ずっとFriend（オリジナルカラオケ） Always a Friend (Original Karaoke))
19. Anata Oikake Jinsei Minato (Original Karaoke) (あなた追いかけ人生港（オリジナルカラオケ） Harbor of Life Where I Came Chasing You (Original Karaoke))
20. Watashi wa Ojamajo Hana-chan!! (Original Karaoke) (わたしはおジャ魔女ハナちゃん！！（オリジナルカラオケ） I Am Ojamajo Hana-chan!! (Original Karaoke))
21. Daisuki na Ehon to Mama no Uta (Original Karaoke) (だいすきな絵本とママのうた（オリジナルカラオケ） I Love the Picture Book and Mama's Song (Original Karaoke))
22. Damon ne! Hana-chan (Original Karaoke) (だもんね！ハナちゃん（オリジナルカラオケ）)
23. DANCE! Ojamajo (Original Karaoke) (DANCE! おジャ魔女（オリジナルカラオケ）)
24. Watashi no Tsubasa (Original Karaoke) (わたしのつばさ（オリジナルカラオケ） My Wings (Original Karaoke))

DISC 2

1. DANCE! Ojamajo (DANCE! おジャ魔女)
2. Ojamajo Ondo de Happy-py!! (おジャ魔女音頭でハッピッピ！！ Happy-py Ojamajo Work Song!!)
3. Ojamajo is No. 1! (おジャ魔女 is No. 1!)
4. DOKKA~N! Party Time!! (ドッカ～ン！パーティータイム！！)
5. Egao no Mirai he... (笑顔の未来へ... Toward a Smiling Future...)
6. Katamusubi (かたむすび Half-knot)
7. MAHO de Cha-cha-cha (MAHOでチャチャチャ MAHO Cha-cha-cha)
8. Fukazume Fighter ~ Candy Itou no Theme (深爪ファイター～キャンディ伊藤のテーマ Extremely Short-Nailed Fighter ~ Candy Itou's Theme)
9. Soreyuke! Majoranger (それゆけ！マジョレンジャー Let's Go! Majoranger)
10. Kiai Ippatsu Kimechae Otome! (気合い一発キメちゃえ乙女！ One Spirit to Win the Maiden!)
11. Zutto Friend (ずっとFriend Always a Friend)
12. Watashi no Tsubasa (わたしのつばさ My Wings)
13. Anata Oikake Jinsei Minato (Full Version) (あなた追いかけ人生港（フルバージョン） Harbor of Life Where I Came Chasing You (Full Version))
14. Merry-Go-Round (メリーゴーランド)
15. OK!
16. Ao no Kanata he (青のかなたへ The Other Side of Blue)
17. Cherry Bomb!
18. Rainbow
19. Thank You, Mommies (サンキューマミーズ)

DISC 3

1. Prologue ~ MAHO-Dou (プロローグ～MAHO堂)
2. Iza Majokai he Shuppaatsu! (いざ魔法界へしゅっぱーつ！ Now, Let's Depart To the Witch World!)
3. Oyajiide no Quiz Corner Sono 1 (オヤジーデのクイズコーナー その1 Oyajiide's Quiz Corner Part 1)
4. Youkoso! Majo Youchien Hen (ようこそ！魔女幼稚園篇 Welcome! Witch Kindergarten Chapter)
5. Majogaeru no Mura he (Intermission) (魔女ガエルの村へ（インターミッション） Village of the Witch Frogs (Intermission))
6. Oyajiide no Quiz Corner Sono 2 (オヤジーデのクイズコーナー その2 Oyajiide's Quiz Corner Part 2)
7. Youkoso! Majokai Hawaiian Center Hen (ようこそ！魔女界ハワイアンセンター篇 Welcome! Witch World Hawaiian Center Chapter)
8. Epilogue (エピローグ)
9. Omake Corner - Ojamajo Sanpun Cooking!? (おまけコーナー・おジャ魔女3分クッキング！？ Bonus Corner - Ojamajo Three-Minute Cooking!?)
10. Opening - Hana-chan no Goaisatsu (オープニング・ハナちゃんのごあいさつ Opening - Hana-chan's Greeting)
11. Talk 1 - Hana-chan no Toaru Ichinichi (Yoru-hen) (トーク(1)ハナちゃんのとある一日（夜編） Talk 1 - A Particular Day of Hana-chan (Evening Part))
12. Talk 2 - Hana-chan no Toaru Ichinichi (Asa-hen) (トーク(2)ハナちゃんのとある一日（朝編） Talk 2 - A Particular Day of Hana-chan (Morning Part))
13. Super Ojou-sama! (Reika Tamaki & Kaori Shimakura) (スーパーお嬢様！（玉木麗香＆島倉かおり） Super Mistress!)
14. Katsuji•Manga•Kokuhaku? (Nobuko Yokokawa & Miho Maruyama) (カツジ・マンガ・コクハク？（横川信子＆丸山みほ） (Printing•Manga•Confession?)
15. Namida no Broken♥Heart (Takurou Hagiwara) (涙のブロークン♥ハート（萩原たくろう） Tears of a Broken♥Heart)
16. Niji wo Tsukamitai (Kayoko Nagato) (虹をつかみたい（長門かよこ） I Want to Grab the Rainbow)
17. Ano Ko wo Tsurete World Cup (Tetsuya Kotake) (あの娘を連れてワールドカップ（小竹哲也） Bring That Girl Along to the World Cup)
18. Ago Yori Ai wo Komete (Masato Rinno) (アゴより愛をこめて（林野まさと） Love From Ago)
19. Midnight Rider (Seki-sensei) (Midnight Rider（関先生）)

DISC 4

1. Watashi wa Ojamajo Hana-chan!! (わたしはおジャ魔女ハナちゃん！！ I Am Ojamajo Hana-chan!!)
2. Daisuki na Ehon to Mama no Uta (だいすきな絵本とママのうた I Love the Picture Book and Mama's Song)
3. Damon ne! Hana-chan (だもんね！ハナちゃん)
4. Soft Cream wo Tabenagara (Sachiko Ijuuin) (ソフトクリームを食べながら（伊集院さちこ） Eat with Soft Cream)
5. Owarai no Michi (SOS Trio vs. Toyoken) (お笑いの道（SOSトリオVSトヨケン） The Way of the Comedy)
6. Flower Bed (Marina Koizumi) (フラワーベッド（小泉まりな）)
7. Wasurenai... (Shiori Nakayama) (忘れない...（中山しおり） Don't Forget...)
8. Butsu Batsu Nice Guy (Nobuaki Yamauchi) (ブツバツナイスガイ（山内信秋）)
9. Tte Yuuka, Yukka Nano (Nishizawa-sensei) (ってゆーか、優香なの（西沢先生） Or Perhaps I Should Say, Yuuka)
10. DANCE! Ojamajo (Musical Collection Version) (DANCE! おジャ魔女（ミュージカルコレクションヴァージョン）)
11. Omae ni Rock You! (おまえに！Rock You We Rock You!)
12. Pirikapiri♥Lucky! (MAHO-Dou Version) (ピリカピリ♥ラッキー!（MAHO堂 Version）)
13. Anata Oikake Jinsei Minato (Karaoke Echo Version) (あなた追いかけ人生港（カラオケエコー・バージョン） Harbor of Life Where I Came Chasing You (Karaoke Echo Version))
14. Watashi wa Ojamajo Hana-chan!! (わたしはおジャ魔女ハナちゃん！！ I Am Ojamajo Hana-chan!!)
15. MAHO de Cha-cha-cha (-2 Version) (MAHOでチャチャチャ（-2バージョン） MAHO Cha-cha-cha (-2 Version))
16. Sekai wa Love and Peace (世界はラブアンドピース World Love and Peace）
17. WE CAN DO!
18. Ojamajo Ondo de Happy-py!! (おジャ魔女音頭でハッピッピ！！ Happy-py Ojamajo Work Song!!)
19. Watashi no Tsubasa (Shutsuensha Kashou Version) (わたしのつばさ（出演者歌唱バージョン） My Wings (Actors Singing Version))
20. <Curtain Call> DANCE! Ojamajo (TV Size) (<カーテンコール> DANCE! おジャ魔女（TVサイズ）)
21. DANCE! Ojamajo (Instrumental Version) (DANCE! おジャ魔女（インストゥルメンタルVersion）)
22. Ending ~ Friends (Instrumental)
23. Watashi no Tsubasa (TV Size) (わたしのつばさ（TVサイズ） My Wings (TV Size))

== Ojamajo Doremi Na-i-sho ==
=== Na-i-sho Yo! Ojamajo ===
This single was produced by Marvelous Entertainment, Inc. and distributed by Geneon Entertainment, Inc., and was released on 24 September 2004. It contains the full versions of the opening and ending theme songs of the Ojamajo Doremi Na-i-sho series, along with karaoke versions. A limited-edition version including a DVD of the opening and ending animations was also released.

Staff

- Artists: MAHO-dou
- Composers: Takayuki Yoshiyama [1], Masatoshi Sakashita [2]
- Arranger: Morifumi Kawamoto
- Lyricist: Miyu Yuzuki

Tracks

1. Na-i-sho Yo! Ojamajo (ナ・イ・ショYO!おジャ魔女 Se-cr-et Yo! Ojamajo)
2. Suteki Mugendai (ステキ∞ Wonderful Infinity)
3. Na-i-sho Yo! Ojamajo (Original Karaoke) (ナ・イ・ショYO!おジャ魔女 (オリジナルカラオケ) Se-cr-et Yo! Ojamajo (Original Karaoke))
4. Suteki Mugendai (Original Karaoke) (ステキ∞ (オリジナルカラオケ) Wonderful Infinity (Original Karaoke))
