= Sawa Ishige =

Japanese voice actress (born 1979)

- 石毛 佐和
- Born: February 7, 1979 (age 47); Chiba Prefecture, Japan
- Occupation: Voice actress
- Years active: 1998-present

Sawa Ishige (石毛 佐和, Ishige Sawa; born February 7, 1979 in Chiba) is a Japanese voice actress.

== Filmography ==
=== Anime ===
1999

- Pop Harukaze in Ojamajo Doremi (Magical Doremi)
- Takako Takakura in Magic User's Club

2000

- Paiway Underberg in Vandread
- Chiyo in InuYasha
- Satoko Takanashi in Gate Keepers

2001

- Norma in Little Snow Fairy Sugar

2002

- Sinobu Amou in The King of Fighters EX2: Howling Blood
- Izumi Orimoto (Zoe Orimoto) in Digimon Frontier

2003

- Sho-gun in Stratos 4

2005

- Haruna Saotome in Negima
- Loco in MÄR
- Tomoko Egawa in Gokujou Seitokai
- Yuuna Kashiwagi and Yuuma Kashiwagi in Pani Poni Dash!
- Minami Shibuya in Hell Girl
- Meryl Tyler in SoltyRei

2006

- Yumiko in Gunbuster (DVD appendix part)

2008

- Benika Jūzawa in Kure-nai
- Kosuzu Sakurazaki / Tanpopo in Sumeba Miyako no Cosmos-Sou
- Ikue Ogawa in High School Girls
- Madoka in Otomedius
- Gelato in Hamtaro
- Mari in Dream C Club

2017

- Haruna Saotome in UQ Holder!

=== Drama CD ===
2003

- Izumi Orimoto (Zoe Orimoto) in Digimon Frontier Original Story: Things That Want To Be Told

2019

- Izumi Orimoto (Zoe Orimoto) in Digimon Frontier 2019: A Train Named Hope

=== Videogames ===
2021

- Tinkermon, Kazemon, Zephyrmon & JetSilphymon in Digimon New Century
