= Chiemi Chiba =

Japanese actress (born 1975)

- 千葉 千恵巳
- Born: February 25, 1975 (age 51); Kawaguchi, Saitama, Japan
- Occupations: Actress; voice actress
- Years active: 1989–present
- Agent: Umikaze
- Children: 1

Chiemi Chiba (千葉 千恵巳, Chiba Chiemi; born February 25, 1975) is a Japanese actress, voice actress, and singer. She was born in Kawaguchi, Saitama, and made her professional singing debut on April 7, 1993, as a member of the J-Pop group Aurora Gonin Musume. She is best known for her roles from the anime series as Yuzuriha Nekoi in Tsubasa Chronicle, Hinako in Sister Princess, Doremi Harukaze in Ojamajo Doremi, Nanaka Kirisato in Nanaka 6/17, Wanya in UFO Baby and Kyoko Kirisaki in Black Cat. She announced on February 25, 2013, that she had gotten married and had a child.

== Filmography ==
=== Television animation ===
1998

- Verda Tanko He Mo-su – Micah
- Chosoku Spinner – Rian Yumemiya

1999

- Space Pirate Mito – Konabi
- Hoshin Engi – Kibi
- Aoi & Mutsuki: A Pair of Queens – Konabi
- Ojamajo Doremi – Doremi Harukaze
- Zoids – Merrian

2000

- Mon Colle Knights – Adventurers Pocket
- Pilot Candidate – Saki Mimori
- Daa! Daa! Daa! – Wannya
- Ojamajo Doremi Sharp – Doremi Harukaze
- Gate Keepers – Saemi Ukiya
- Tottoko Hamtarō Dechu – Ponytail-chan

2001

- Mo~tto! Ojamajo Doremi – Doremi Harukaze
- Mobile Angel: Angelic Layer – Arisu Fujisaki
- Sister Princess – Hinako

2002

- Ojamajo Doremi Dokka~n! – Doremi Harukaze
- Mirmo de Pon! – Akumi
- The Twelve Kingdoms – Kei-Kei
- Asobotto Senki Goku – Marie
- Sister Princess: Re Pure – Hinako
- Galaxy Angel A – Hariu Framboise

2003

- Nanaka 6/17 – Nanaka Kirisato
- Kaleido Star – Lucy
- Zatch Bell! – Natsuko
- Di Gi Charat Nyo! – Housekeeper
- Dokkoida?! – Hinako
- Requiem from the Darkness – Orikudon
- Rockman EXE Axess – AquaMan

2004

- Legendz: Yomigaeru Ryuuou Densetsu – Anna
- Duel Masters Charge – Imelda
- Sweet Valerian – Lycorine
- Pocket Monsters – Erica
- Rockman EXE Stream – AquaMan

2005

- Ah! My Goddess (Ex)
- Black Cat – Kyoko Kirisaki
- MÄR – Emokis
- Odenkun – Tamago-chan
- Happy Seven – Tamon Kitayama
- Tsubasa Chronicle – Yuzuriha Nekoi
- Rockman EXE Beast – AquaMan
- Mushi-Shi – Akoya

2006

- Hime-sama Goyojin – Karen
- Rockman EXE Beast+ – AquaMan

2007

- Hatarakids My Ham Gumi – Sylvie

2008

- Noramimi – Mai
- Duel Masters Cross – Imelda
- Monochrome Factor – Sarasa Nishikiori
- Kyōran Kazoku Nikki – DojiDevil
- Hakushaku to Yōsei – Merrow Girl
- To Love-Ru – Magical Kyoko (ep. 10,20), Mio Sawada

2009

- Marie & Gali – Marika
- Gokujō!! Mecha Mote Iinchō – Temo Temo

2010

- Marie & Gali ver. 2.0 – Marika
- Motto To Love-Ru – Mio Sawada, Magical Kyoko
- Star Driver – Benio Shinada / Scarlet Kiss

2012

- To Love-Ru Darkness – Mio Sawada, Magical Kyoko

2013

- Rozen Maiden – Zurückspulen (Kirakishou/Schnee Kristall)
- Walkure Romanze – Fiona Beckford

2015

- To Love-Ru Darkness 2nd – Mio Sawada

2016

- Tiger Mask W – Ruriko Yamashina

2017

- Kirakira PreCure a la Mode – Bibury

=== OVA ===
1998

- Getter Robo: Armageddon – Operator

2004

- Ojamajo Doremi Naisho – Doremi Harukaze

2005

- Majokko Tsukune-chan – Kokoro

=== Theatrical animation ===
2000

- Ojamajo Doremi #: The Movie – Doremi Harukaze

2001

- Mōtto! Ojamajo Doremi: The Secret of the Frog Stone – Doremi Harukaze

2013

- Star Driver the Movie – Benio Shinada

2020

- Looking for Ojamajo Doremi – Doremi Harukaze

=== Video games ===
1994

- Sotsugyō Shashin/Biki – Ayumi Tachibana

2001

- True Love Story 3 – Madoka Onodera
- Kaenseibo – Kyoko Kiyono
- Doki Pretty League Lovely Star – Aika Takagamine

2006

- Black Cat ~Angel Clockwork~ – Kyoko Kirisaki

2008

- To LoveRu: Waku Waku! Rinkangakkou-Hen – Mio Sawada, Magical Kyoko

2011

- Star Driver: Kagayaki no Takuto - Ginga Bishounen Densetsu – Benio Shinada

2019

- Puyo Puyo Quest - Doremi Harukaze
- Yuki Aoyagi in Cosplay Senshi Cutie Knight
- Kenka Gurentai
- Marusō Kaizō Jidōsha Kyōshūjo 1 & 2

== Photobooks ==
- "Mizen" (1994, Bunkasha)

== Dubbing ==
- Barney & Friends - Baby Bop
- Sofia the First - Princess Vivian
- The Pout-Pout Fish - Pip
