= Tomoko Akiya =

Japanese voice actress

- 秋谷 智子
- Born: May 14, 1976 (age 50); Chiba Prefecture, Japan
- Occupation: Voice actress
- Years active: 1999–present
- Notable credits: Ojamajo Doremi as Hazuki Fujiwara; Zatch Bell! as Suzume Mizuno

Tomoko Akiya (秋谷 智子, Akiya Tomoko; born May 14, 1976 in Chiba Prefecture) is a Japanese voice actress and former model. Her best-known role is voicing Hazuki Fujiwara in the Ojamajo Doremi series, and Suzume Mizuno in Zatch Bell!.

== Career ==
Prior to voice acting, Akiya had been a model.

== Filmography ==
=== Anime ===
- Ojamajo Doremi – Hazuki Fujiwara
- Zatch Bell! – Suzume Mizuno
- Penguin Musume Heart – Riff
- Demashita! Powerpuff Girls Z – Miss Keane
- Casshern Sins – Sophita
- Dream Eater Merry – Yui Kounagi

=== Video games ===
- Zatch Bell! series – Suzume Mizuno
- Ojamajo Doremi series, Puyo Puyo Quest - Hazuki Fujiwara
