= Nanae Katō =

Japanese voice actress

- 加藤 奈々絵
- Occupation: Voice actress
- Years active: 1998–present
- Notable credit(s): Princess Tutu as Ahiru / Princess Tutu; Croket! as Croket

Nanae Katō (加藤 奈々絵, Katō Nanae) is a Japanese voice actress. Her best-known roles are as title characters in Croket!, Noramimi, and as well the lead role of Ahiru Arima from Princess Tutu.

== Filmography ==
- Fancy Lala (1998), Boy (ep 19), Classmate (ep 7), Old Woman (ep 18), Student (ep 1), Student (2) (ep 10)
- Eat-Man '98 (1998), Alex
- Magic User's Club (1999), Madoka Masuko
- EX-Driver (2000)
- Inuyasha (2000), Child (Ep 162)
- Shiawase Sou no Okojo-san (2001), Yuuta Kudoo
- Magical Play (2001), Mustard
- Magical Play 3D (2001), Mustard
- UFO Ultramaiden Valkyrie (2002), Maid D
- Shrine of the Morning Mist (2002), Chika Yurikasa
- Princess Tutu (2002), Ahiru/Princess Tutu
- Pokémon Advance (2002), Pacchiru (ep 57)
- Croquette! (2003), Croquette
- Godannar (2003), Hayashi
- The Galaxy Railways (2003), Sarai (ep 9)
- Peacemaker (2003), Hana
- Rockman.EXE Stream (2004), Hazuki Yui
- Agatha Christie's Great Detectives Poirot and Marple (2004), Annie
- Kujibiki Unbalance (2004), Kenji Suzuki
- Transformers: Cybertron (2005), Skids
- Shakugan no Shana (2005), Domino
- Animal Yokocho (2005), Macchi
- Bakegyamon (2006), Mikiharu Kawaguchi, Theme Song Performance (ED2)
- Fushigiboshi no Futago Hime Gyu! (2006), March
- Kamichama Karin (2007), Shii-chan/Nike
- Shakugan no Shana Second (2007), Domino
- Tamagotchi! (2007), Kuromametchi
- Shugo Chara! (2007), Miki
- Inazuma Eleven (2008), Kakeru Megane
- Noramimi (2008), Noramimi
- Shugo Chara!! Doki— (2008), Miki
- Hayate the Combat Butler!! (2009), Lost Children B
- Yuri's World (2017), Bird

== Trivia ==
- Princess Tutu creator Ikuko Itoh had chosen Katō as the voice of Ahiru long before animation production had begun on the series.
