= World Trigger season 2 =

Season of television series

World Trigger
- Season 2
- Cover art for the first home media volume of the season, featuring the Galopoula Expedition Force
- No. of episodes: 12

Release
- Original network: TV Asahi
- Original release: January 10 – April 4, 2021

Season chronology
- ← Previous; Season 1 Next → Season 3

World Trigger is a Japanese anime television series based on Daisuke Ashihara's manga series of the same name. During Jump Festa '20, it was announced that the series would receive a second season, with the cast reprising their roles. Toei Animation returned to produce the anime. Morio Hatano replaced Kouji Ogawa as series director, while the rest of the staff are reprised their roles. The second season aired on TV Asahi's NUMAnimation programming block from January 10 to April 4, 2021. The opening theme song is "Force" performed by Tomorrow X Together, while the ending theme song is "Mirai Eigō" (未来永劫, lit. 'Future Eternity') performed by "Kami wa Saikoro o Furanai" (神はサイコロを振らない).

On October 8, 2021, it was announced the English dub of season 2 would released in 2022. On September 28, 2022, Toei Animation announced via Twitter that the English dub of both seasons two and three would begin streaming on October 4, 2022.

== Episodes ==
No. overall	No. in season	Title (Note: English translated titles are taken from Crunchyroll.)	Directed by (Note: Production staff information is taken from the ending credits of each episode.)	Written by	Animation directed by	Original release date
74	1	"The Attack"; Transliteration: "Shūrai" (Japanese: 襲来)	Directed by : Miho Hirayama; Storyboarded by : Morio Hatano	Hiroyuki Yoshino	Yūya Takahashi & Tsutomu Ōno	January 10, 2021
75	2	"Collision"; Transliteration: "Gekitotsu" (Japanese: 激突)	Gō Koga	Hiroyuki Yoshino	Akihiro Ōta	January 17, 2021
76	3	"Battle"; Transliteration: "Kessen" (Japanese: 決戦)	Akihiro Nakamura	Hiroyuki Yoshino	Tsutomu Ōno, Toshiaki Satō, Yumenosuke Tokuda, Minoru Okabe & Yōichi Ōnishi	January 24, 2021
77	4	"Destiny"; Transliteration: "Unmei" (Japanese: 運命)	Masatoshi Chioka	Ryunosuke Kingetsu	Hideaki Maniwa	January 31, 2021
78	5	"New Technique"; Transliteration: "Shin Waza" (Japanese: 新技)	Yoshifumi Sueda	Hiroshi Ōnogi	Kaori Yoshikawa, Kei Hyōdō, Miho Uetsuhara, Mitsuteru Kubo, Hiroshi Maejima, Hisae Ikezu & Tsutomu Ōno	February 7, 2021
79	6	"Strong Will"; Transliteration: "Iji" (Japanese: 意地)	Maya Asakura	Hiroshi Ōnogi	Eisaku Inoue	February 21, 2021 (Note: This episode did not air on the scheduled date, February 14, 2021, as TV Asahi had broadcast special programming regarding the 2021 Fukushima earthquake. The episode was still released in time on AbemaTV and aired on TV Asahi on February 21. The date on the table reflects TV Asahi's broadcast date.)
80	7	"Showdown"; Transliteration: "Shōbu" (Japanese: 勝負)	Directed by : Miho Hirayama; Storyboarded by : Morio Hatano	Hiroyuki Yoshino	Masayuki Satō, Ikuko Ito, Tsutomu Ōno & Hiroyuki Honda	February 28, 2021
81	8	"Negotiation"; Transliteration: "Kōshō" (Japanese: 交渉)	Kōji Kawasaki	Ryunosuke Kingetsu	Risa Aihara	March 7, 2021
82	9	"Captain"; Transliteration: "Taichō" (Japanese: 隊長)	Directed by : Wataru Matsumi; Storyboarded by : Wataru Matsumi & Koichi Ohata	Hiroshi Ōnogi	Yōichi Ōnishi, Ikuko Ito, Tsutomu Ōno, Toshiaki Satō & Minoru Okabe	March 14, 2021
83	10	"The Upper Ranks"; Transliteration: "Jōi" (Japanese: 上位)	Akihiro Nakamura	Hiroyuki Yoshino	Yōichi Ōnishi, Hiroyuki Honda, Toshiaki Satō, Yumenosuke Tokuda & Minoru Okabe	March 21, 2021
84	11	"The Strong Ones"; Transliteration: "Kyōsha" (Japanese: 強者)	Gō Koga	Ryunosuke Kingetsu	Akihiro Ōta	March 28, 2021
85	12	"New Face"; Transliteration: "Shinjin" (Japanese: 新人)	Kōji Ogawa	Hiroshi Ōnogi	Hiroyuki Honda, Toshiaki Satō, Yumenosuke Tokuda & Minoru Okabe	April 4, 2021
