= List of World Trigger episodes =

World Trigger is a Japanese anime television series based on the manga series of the same name by Daisuke Ashihara. In May 2014, the anime series adaptation was announced to start airing in October of the same year. The series was produced by Toei Animation and broadcast on TV Asahi from October 5, 2014, to April 3, 2016. The first season was directed by Mitsuru Hongo, with series composition written by Hiroyuki Yoshino. Toshihisa Kaiya and Hitomi Tsuruta respectively served as character designer and animation director, with music composed by Kenji Kawai. The series was originally slated to run for 50 episodes, but ended up receiving 73.

In summer 2015, the World Trigger Summer Festival 2015 event announced World Trigger: Isekai Kara no Tōbōsha, a brand new series with an original story not presented in the World Trigger manga, and with new characters and concepts. This "new series" actually ended up being the "Fugitive Arc" of the anime, which ran from Episodes 49 to 63. On March 7, 2016, it was confirmed that the World Trigger anime would end, after it was announced that TV Asahi would be replacing the time slot airing it with sports programming.

In North America, Toei announced in July 2015 that they would be producing an English dub with Ocean Productions. The series began airing in the United States on Primo TV on January 16, 2017. The English dub became available on Crunchyroll on February 11, 2020.

During Jump Festa '20, it was announced that the series would receive a second season, with the cast reprising their roles. Toei Animation returned to produce the season. Morio Hatano served as the season's director, while the rest of the staff reprised their roles. The second season aired on TV Asahi's NUMAnimation programming block from January 10 to April 4, 2021. In October 2021, it was announced the English dub of the second season would be released in 2022.

During Jump Festa 2021, it was announced that the series would receive a third season, with the second season airing for one cours (season) in Fall 2021. The third season having aired from October 10, 2021, to January 23, 2022. In December 2021, two additional episodes for the third season were ordered for broadcast in January 2022.

== Series overview ==
Season	Episodes	Originally released	
Season	Episodes	First released	Last released
1	73	October 5, 2014	April 3, 2016
2	12	January 10, 2021	April 4, 2021
3	14	October 10, 2021	January 23, 2022

== Episodes ==
=== Season 1 (2014–16) ===
No. overall	No. in season	Title	Directed by	Written by	Animation directed by	Original release date
1	1	"Visitor from the Other World"; Transliteration: "I Sekai kara no Raihōsha" (Japanese: 異世界からの来訪者)	Mitsuru Hongo	Hiroyuki Yoshino	Yūji Hakamada	October 5, 2014
2	2	"Neighbor and Trion Soldier"; Transliteration: "Neibā to Torion-hei" (Japanese: 近界民(ネイバー)とトリオン兵)	Directed by : Shigeru Ueda; Storyboarded by : Ken Koyama	Hiroyuki Yoshino	Kazuyuki Kobayashi & Chūichi Iguchi	October 12, 2014
3	3	"Osamu Mikumo's Ability"; Transliteration: "Mikumo Osamu no Jitsuryoku" (Japanese: 三雲修の実力)	Directed by : Kazuya Karasawa; Storyboarded by : Kōhei Kureta	Hiroyuki Yoshino	Yasuhiro Namatame	October 19, 2014
4	4	"Ai Kitora, A-Rank No.5 Agent"; Transliteration: "Ē-kyū Faibu-i・Arashiyama-tai no Kitora Ai" (Japanese: A級5位・嵐山隊の木虎藍)	Yoshiki Kawasaki	Yuuichi Nomura	Eisaku Inoue	November 2, 2014
5	5	"Power Elite, Yūichi Jin"; Transliteration: "Jitsuryoku-ha Erīto・Jin Yūichi" (Japanese: 実力派エリート・迅悠一)	Mitsuru Hongo	Natsuko Takahashi	Toshihisa Kaiya	November 9, 2014
6	6	"Chika Amatori's Side Effect"; Transliteration: "Amatori Chika no Saido Efekuto" (Japanese: 雨取千佳のサイドエフェクト)	Kimitoshi Chioka	Masahiro Yokotani	Masahiro Naoi	November 16, 2014
7	7	"Miwa Squad's Assault"; Transliteration: "Miwa-tai no Kyōshū" (Japanese: 三輪隊の強襲)	Directed by : Kazuya Karasawa; Storyboarded by : Junji Shimizu	Hiroyuki Yoshino	Noboru Koizumi	November 23, 2014
8	8	"Black Trigger"; Transliteration: "Burakku Torigā" (Japanese: ブラックトリガー)	Directed by : Akihiro Nakamura; Storyboarded by : Takeshi Mori	Yuuichi Nomura	Gen Sato	November 30, 2014
9	9	"The Organization Known as Border"; Transliteration: "Bōdā to Iu Soshiki" (Japanese: ボーダーという組織)	Jun Kamiya	Natsuko Takahashi	Yūki Kawashima	December 7, 2014
10	10	"Tamakoma Branch"; Transliteration: "Tamakoma Shibu" (Japanese: 玉狛支部)	Directed by : Shigeru Ueda; Storyboarded by : Takeshi Mori	Masahiro Yokotani	Hitomi Tsuruta	December 14, 2014
11	11	"Each One's Determination"; Transliteration: "Sorezore no Ketsui" (Japanese: それぞれの決意)	Ken Koyama	Hiroyuki Yoshino	Yūji Hakamada	December 21, 2014
12	12	"A-Rank Agents of Tamakoma"; Transliteration: "Tamakoma no Ē-kyū Taiin" (Japanese: 玉狛のA級隊員)	Yoshiki Kawasaki	Natsuko Takahashi	Yasuhiro Namatame	December 28, 2014
13	13	"Border's Top Teams"; Transliteration: "Bōdā Toppu Chīmu" (Japanese: ボーダートップチーム)	Mitsuru Hongo	Hiroyuki Yoshino	Toshihisa Kaiya	January 11, 2015
14	14	"No. 1 Attacker, Kei Tachikawa"; Transliteration: "Nanbā Wan Atakkā・Tachikawa Kei" (Japanese: NO.1アタッカー・太刀川慶)	Akihiro Nakamura	Hiroyuki Yoshino	Eisaku Inoue	January 18, 2015
15	15	"Black Trigger, Fūjin"; Transliteration: "Burakku Torigā・Fūjin" (Japanese: ブラックトリガー・風刃(ふうじん))	Kazuya Karasawa	Natsuko Takahashi	Noboru Koizumi	January 25, 2015
16	16	"The Future Moves Forward"; Transliteration: "Ugokidasu Mirai" (Japanese: 動き出す未来)	Yutaka Tsuchida	Masahiro Yokotani	Masahiro Naoi	February 8, 2015
17	17	"Border Official Enlistment"; Transliteration: "Bōdā Seishikinyuutai" (Japanese: ボーダー正式入隊)	Jun Kamiya	Yuuichi Nomura	Yūki Kawashima & Kiichi Takaoka	February 15, 2015
18	18	"Osamu Mikumo vs. Sōya Kazama"; Transliteration: "Mikumo Osamu bāsasu Kazama Sōya" (Japanese: 三雲修VS風間蒼也)	Directed by : Shigeru Ueda; Storyboarded by : Takeshi Mori	Masahiro Yokotani	Yūji Hakamada	February 22, 2015
19	19	"Rank War! Shun Midorikawa's Plot"; Transliteration: "Ranku-sen! Midorikawa Shun no Sakuryaku" (Japanese: ランク戦!緑川駿の策略)	Hiroyuki Kakudō	Hiroyuki Yoshino	Yasuhiro Namatame	March 1, 2015
20	20	"Clash! Yūma vs. Midorikawa"; Transliteration: "Gekitotsu! Yūma bāsasu Midorikawa" (Japanese: 激突！遊真VS緑川)	Ken Koyama	Natsuko Takahashi	Masahiro Naoi	March 8, 2015
21	21	"Neighbors' World"; Transliteration: "Neibā no Sekai" (Japanese: 近界民(ネイバー)の世界)	Yoshiki Kawasaki	Masahiro Yokotani	Setsuko Nobuzane & Hideki Araki	March 15, 2015
22	22	"The Large-Scale Invasion Begins"; Transliteration: "Daikibo Shinkō Kaishi" (Japanese: 大規模侵攻開始)	Directed by : Akihiro Nakamura; Storyboarded by : Takeshi Mori	Hiroyuki Yoshino	Francis Kaneda & Joey Calangian	March 22, 2015
23	23	"The Holy Land, Aftokrator"; Transliteration: "Kami no Kuni Afutokuratoru" (Japanese: 神の国アフトクラトル)	Kimitoshi Chioka	Yuuichi Nomura	Noboru Koizumi	March 29, 2015
24	24	"Meeden's Baby Birds"; Transliteration: "Mīden no Hinadori" (Japanese: 玄界(ミデン)の雛鳥)	Yutaka Tsuchida	Natsuko Takahashi	Eisaku Inoue	April 5, 2015
25	25	"The Most Powerful Squad in Border"; Transliteration: "Bōdā Saikyō no Butai" (Japanese: ボーダー最強の部隊)	Jun Kamiya	Hiroyuki Yoshino	Kiichi Takaoka, Tōru Yoshida & Sayumi Yokoyama	April 12, 2015
26	26	"A Fierce Fight! Enedora vs. Kazama Squad"; Transliteration: "Gekitō! Enedora bāsasu Kazama-tai" (Japanese: 激闘！エネドラVS風間隊)	Hiroyuki Kakudō	Hiroyuki Yoshino	Yūji Hakamada	April 19, 2015
27	27	"Border on the Counterattack"; Transliteration: "Hangeki no Bōdā" (Japanese: 反撃のボーダー)	Directed by : Shigeru Ueda; Storyboarded by : Mitsuru Hongo	Yuuichi Nomura	Yasuhiro Namatame & Eisaku Inoue	April 26, 2015
28	28	"The Organon User"; Transliteration: "Oruganon no Tsukaite" (Japanese: 星の杖(オルガノン)の使い手)	Directed by : Mana Uchiyama; Storyboarded by : Takeshi Mori	Natsuko Takahashi	Masahiro Naoi	May 3, 2015
29	29	"Crossroads of Fate"; Transliteration: "Unmei no Bunkiten" (Japanese: 運命の分岐点)	Ken Koyama	Hiroyuki Yoshino	Yōichi Ōnishi	May 10, 2015
30	30	"The Enemy Captain, Hyrein"; Transliteration: "Tekishō Hairein" (Japanese: 敵将ハイレイン)	Yoshiki Kawasaki	Masahiro Yokotani	Setsuko Nobuzane, Eikichi Takahashi & Noel Añonuevo	May 17, 2015
31	31	"Osamu Mikumo's Determination"; Transliteration: "Mikumo Osamu no Kakugo" (Japanese: 三雲修の覚悟)	Directed by : Yutaka Tsuchida; Storyboarded by : Hiroyuki Kakudō	Yuuichi Nomura	Noboru Koizumi	May 24, 2015
32	32	"Implacable Enedora"; Transliteration: "Shūnen no Enedora" (Japanese: 執念のエネドラ)	Directed by : Akihiro Nakamura; Storyboarded by : Takeshi Mori	Yuuichi Nomura	Yūji Hakamada	May 31, 2015
33	33	"Terror of Hyrein"; Transliteration: "Hairein no Kyōfu" (Japanese: ハイレインの恐怖)	Jun Kamiya	Hiroyuki Yoshino	Kiichi Takaoka	June 7, 2015
34	34	"A Fierce Showdown! The Fight of the Best"; Transliteration: "Gekitō Kecchaku! Saikyō no Tatakai" (Japanese: 激闘決着！最強の戦い)	Directed by : Kazuya Karasawa; Storyboarded by : Takeshi Mori	Natsuko Takahashi	Eisaku Inoue	June 14, 2015
35	35	"The End of the Battle"; Transliteration: "Tatakai no Hate ni" (Japanese: 戦いの果てに)	Directed by : Yoshiki Kawasaki; Storyboarded by : Kimitoshi Chioka & Yoshiki Kawasaki	Masahiro Yokotani	Yasuhiro Namatame, Megumi Yamashita, Naoki Murakami & Nobuhiro Masuda	June 21, 2015
36	36	"The Have-Not"; Transliteration: "Motazaru-mono" (Japanese: 持たざる者)	Mitsuru Hongo	Yuuichi Nomura	Masahiro Naoi	June 28, 2015
37	37	"Hero and Partner"; Transliteration: "Hīrō to Aibō" (Japanese: ヒーローと相棒)	Shigeru Ueda	Hiroyuki Yoshino	Yōichi Ōnishi	July 5, 2015
38	38	"B-Rank Wars Begin"; Transliteration: "Bī-kyū Rankusen Kaimaku" (Japanese: B級ランク戦開幕)	Kōnosuke Uda	Natsuko Takahashi	Noboru Koizumi	July 19, 2015
39	39	"Suwa Squad and Arafune Squad"; Transliteration: "Suwa-tai to Arafune-tai" (Japanese: 諏訪隊と荒船隊)	Yutaka Tsuchida	Masahiro Yokotani	Setsuko Nobuzane & Eikichi Takahashi	July 26, 2015
40	40	"Start-Up! Mikumo Squad"; Transliteration: "Shidō! Mikumo-tai" (Japanese: 始動！三雲隊)	Jun Kamiya	Yuuichi Nomura	Kiichi Takaoka	August 2, 2015
41	41	"An Impertinent Rookie"; Transliteration: "Namaikina Rūkī" (Japanese: 生意気な新人(ルーキー))	Directed by : Mana Uchiyama; Storyboarded by : Takeshi Mori	Hiroyuki Yoshino	Yūji Hakamada	August 9, 2015
42	42	"Kō Murakami of Suzunari First"; Transliteration: "Suzunari Daiichi no Murakami Kō" (Japanese: 鈴鳴第一の村上鋼)	Ken Koyama	Natsuko Takahashi	Yasuhiro Namatame, Nobuhiro Masuda & Megumi Yamashita	August 16, 2015
43	43	"Nasu Squad's Choice"; Transliteration: "Nasu-tai no Sentaku" (Japanese: 那須隊の選択)	Directed by : Shigeru Ueda; Storyboarded by : Takeshi Mori	Yuuichi Nomura	Masahiro Naoi	August 23, 2015
44	44	"Battle in the Foul Weather"; Transliteration: "Akutenkō no Sentō" (Japanese: 悪天候の戦闘)	Kazuya Karasawa	Masahiro Yokotani	Eisaku Inoue	August 30, 2015
45	45	"The Thing That Decides the Battle"; Transliteration: "Shōbu o Kimeru Mono" (Japanese: 勝負を決めるもの)	Akihiro Nakamura	Yuuichi Nomura	Yōichi Ōnishi	September 6, 2015
46	46	"The Ace's Willpower"; Transliteration: "Ēsu no Iji" (Japanese: エースの意地)	Mitsuru Hongo	Natsuko Takahashi	Noboru Koizumi	September 20, 2015
47	47	"The Captain's Pride"; Transliteration: "Taichō no Puraido" (Japanese: 隊長のプライド)	Directed by : Takuma Suzuki; Storyboarded by : Takeshi Mori	Masahiro Yokotani	Kiichi Takaoka	September 27, 2015
48	48	"And Towards Tomorrow"; Transliteration: "Soshite Ashita e" (Japanese: そして明日へ)	Yoshiki Kawasaki	Yuuichi Nomura	Setsuko Nobuzane & Nobuhiro Masuda	October 4, 2015
49	49	"Fugitives from Another World"; Transliteration: "Isekai kara no Tōbōsha" (Japanese: 異世界からの逃亡者)	Kouji Ogawa	Hiroyuki Yoshino	Yūji Hakamada	October 11, 2015
50	50	"Invisible Assailants"; Transliteration: "Sugata Naki Shūgeki-sha" (Japanese: 姿なき襲撃者)	Directed by : Mana Uchiyama; Storyboarded by : Takeshi Mori	Masahiro Yokotani	Masahiro Naoi	October 18, 2015
51	51	"Xeno's Trion Soldiers"; Transliteration: "Zeno no Torion Hei" (Japanese: ゼノのトリオン兵)	Ken Koyama	Natsuko Takahashi	Yasuhiro Namatame	October 25, 2015
52	52	"The Sunset of Meeden"; Transliteration: "Mīden no Yūhi" (Japanese: 玄界(ミデン)の夕陽)	Kazuya Karasawa	Yuuichi Nomura	Eisaku Inoue	November 1, 2015
53	53	"The One that Shall Be Saved"; Transliteration: "Mamorubeki-mono" (Japanese: 守るべきもの)	Directed by : Shigeru Ueda; Storyboarded by : Takashi Sokabe	Hiroyuki Yoshino	Yōichi Ōnishi	November 8, 2015
54	54	"Giev's Thrust"; Transliteration: "Gīvu no Kōsei" (Japanese: ギーヴの攻勢)	Akihiro Nakamura	Hiroshi Ōnogi	Noboru Koizumi	November 15, 2015
55	55	"Dead or Alive"; Transliteration: "Deddo・oa・Araibu" (Japanese: デッド・オア・アライブ)	Directed by : Takuma Suzuki; Storyboarded by : Yasuhiro Geshi	Hiroshi Ōnogi	Shigenori Taniguchi & Shinichiro Minami	November 22, 2015
56	56	"Mystery of Lilith"; Transliteration: "Ririsu no Nazo" (Japanese: リリスの謎)	Kenichi Takeshita	Toshimitsu Takeuchi	Setsuko Nobuzane & Nobuhiro Masuda	November 29, 2015
57	57	"Xeno and Lilith"; Transliteration: "Zeno to Ririsu" (Japanese: ゼノとリリス)	Directed by : Mana Uchiyama; Storyboarded by : Takeshi Mori	Masahiro Yokotani	Masahiro Naoi	December 6, 2015
58	58	"Captured Osamu"; Transliteration: "Toraware no Osamu" (Japanese: 囚われの修)	Directed by : Shigeru Ueda; Storyboarded by : Isao Torada	Yuuichi Nomura	Yūji Hakamada	December 13, 2015
59	59	"Two Black Triggers"; Transliteration: "Futatsu no Burakku Torigā" (Japanese: 二つのブラックトリガー)	Yoshiki Kawasaki	Hiroyuki Yoshino	Toshihisa Kaiya & Hiroko Kasuga	December 20, 2015
60	60	"Yōtarō's Adventure"; Transliteration: "Yōtarō no Bōken" (Japanese: 陽太郎の冒険)	Ken Koyama	Hiroshi Ōnogi	Yasuhiro Namatame	December 27, 2015
61	61	"Truth and Lies"; Transliteration: "Shinjitsu to Uso" (Japanese: 真実と嘘)	Kazuya Karasawa	Toshimitsu Takeuchi	Yōichi Ōnishi	January 10, 2016
62	62	"Giev and Charon"; Transliteration: "Gīvu to Karon" (Japanese: ギーヴとカロン)	Directed by : Akihiro Nakamura; Storyboarded by : Gō Koga	Masahiro Yokotani	Eisaku Inoue	January 17, 2016
63	63	"A Reversed Future"; Transliteration: "Hanten Suru Mirai" (Japanese: 反転する未来)	Kouji Ogawa	Yuuichi Nomura	Noboru Koizumi	January 24, 2016
64	64	"The Prisoner from Aftokrator"; Transliteration: "Afutokuratoru no Horyo" (Japanese: アフトクラトルの捕虜)	Directed by : Takuma Suzuki; Storyboarded by : Yasuhiro Geshi	Hiroyuki Yoshino	Shigenori Taniguchi & Shinichiro Minami	January 31, 2016
65	65	"No. 1 Shooter, Masataka Ninomiya"; Transliteration: "Nanbā Wan Shūtā Ninomiya Masataka" (Japanese: No.1シューター二宮匡貴)	Directed by : Mana Uchiyama; Storyboarded by : Takashi Sokabe	Hiroshi Ōnogi	Masahiro Naoi	February 7, 2016
66	66	"Sharpened Fangs"; Transliteration: "Togisumasa Reta Kiba" (Japanese: 研ぎ澄まされた牙)	Kenichi Takeshita	Toshimitsu Takeuchi	Setsuko Nobuzane & Yuka Takemori	February 14, 2016
67	67	"The Battle of the Top B-Rank Teams"; Transliteration: "Bī-kyū Jōi-sen" (Japanese: B級上位戦)	Jiro Makino	Masahiro Yokotani	Yūji Hakamada	February 21, 2016
68	68	"The Targeted Tamakoma"; Transliteration: "Nerawareru Tamakoma" (Japanese: 狙われる玉狛)	Yoshiki Kawasaki	Hiroshi Ōnogi	Toshihisa Kaiya & Kiichi Takaoka	February 28, 2016
69	69	"Battle Royal"; Transliteration: "Batoru Roiyaru" (Japanese: バトルロイヤル)	Kazuya Karasawa	Yuuichi Nomura	Yōichi Ōnishi	March 6, 2016
70	70	"A Captain's Duty"; Transliteration: "Taichō no Tsutome" (Japanese: 隊長の務め)	Ken Koyama	Toshimitsu Takeuchi	Yasuhiro Namatame	March 13, 2016
71	71	"A New Threat"; Transliteration: "Aratanaru Kyōi" (Japanese: 新たなる脅威)	Directed by : Shigeru Ueda; Storyboarded by : Takashi Sokabe	Hiroshi Ōnogi	Masahiro Naoi	March 20, 2016
72	72	"An Evolving Mikumo Squad"; Transliteration: "Shinka Suru Mikumo-tai" (Japanese: 進化する三雲隊)	Directed by : Takuma Suzuki; Storyboarded by : Yasuhiro Geshi	Yuuichi Nomura	Shigenori Taniguchi & Shinichiro Minami	March 27, 2016
73	73	"To the Future"; Transliteration: "Mirai e" (Japanese: 未来へ)	Kouji Ogawa	Hiroyuki Yoshino	Noboru Koizumi	April 3, 2016

=== Season 2 (2021) ===
No. overall	No. in season	Title (Note: English translated titles are taken from Crunchyroll.)	Directed by (Note: Production staff information is taken from the ending credits of each episode.)	Written by	Animation directed by	Original release date
74	1	"The Attack"; Transliteration: "Shūrai" (Japanese: 襲来)	Directed by : Miho Hirayama; Storyboarded by : Morio Hatano	Hiroyuki Yoshino	Yūya Takahashi & Tsutomu Ōno	January 10, 2021
75	2	"Collision"; Transliteration: "Gekitotsu" (Japanese: 激突)	Gō Koga	Hiroyuki Yoshino	Akihiro Ōta	January 17, 2021
76	3	"Battle"; Transliteration: "Kessen" (Japanese: 決戦)	Akihiro Nakamura	Hiroyuki Yoshino	Tsutomu Ōno, Toshiaki Satō, Yumenosuke Tokuda, Minoru Okabe & Yōichi Ōnishi	January 24, 2021
77	4	"Destiny"; Transliteration: "Unmei" (Japanese: 運命)	Masatoshi Chioka	Ryunosuke Kingetsu	Hideaki Maniwa	January 31, 2021
78	5	"New Technique"; Transliteration: "Shin Waza" (Japanese: 新技)	Yoshifumi Sueda	Hiroshi Ōnogi	Kaori Yoshikawa, Kei Hyōdō, Miho Uetsuhara, Mitsuteru Kubo, Hiroshi Maejima, Hisae Ikezu & Tsutomu Ōno	February 7, 2021
79	6	"Strong Will"; Transliteration: "Iji" (Japanese: 意地)	Maya Asakura	Hiroshi Ōnogi	Eisaku Inoue	February 21, 2021 (Note: This episode did not air on the scheduled date, February 14, 2021, as TV Asahi had broadcast special programming regarding the 2021 Fukushima earthquake. The episode was still released in time on AbemaTV and aired on TV Asahi on February 21. The date on the table reflects TV Asahi's broadcast date.)
80	7	"Showdown"; Transliteration: "Shōbu" (Japanese: 勝負)	Directed by : Miho Hirayama; Storyboarded by : Morio Hatano	Hiroyuki Yoshino	Masayuki Satō, Ikuko Ito, Tsutomu Ōno & Hiroyuki Honda	February 28, 2021
81	8	"Negotiation"; Transliteration: "Kōshō" (Japanese: 交渉)	Kōji Kawasaki	Ryunosuke Kingetsu	Risa Aihara	March 7, 2021
82	9	"Captain"; Transliteration: "Taichō" (Japanese: 隊長)	Directed by : Wataru Matsumi; Storyboarded by : Wataru Matsumi & Koichi Ohata	Hiroshi Ōnogi	Yōichi Ōnishi, Ikuko Ito, Tsutomu Ōno, Toshiaki Satō & Minoru Okabe	March 14, 2021
83	10	"The Upper Ranks"; Transliteration: "Jōi" (Japanese: 上位)	Akihiro Nakamura	Hiroyuki Yoshino	Yōichi Ōnishi, Hiroyuki Honda, Toshiaki Satō, Yumenosuke Tokuda & Minoru Okabe	March 21, 2021
84	11	"The Strong Ones"; Transliteration: "Kyōsha" (Japanese: 強者)	Gō Koga	Ryunosuke Kingetsu	Akihiro Ōta	March 28, 2021
85	12	"New Face"; Transliteration: "Shinjin" (Japanese: 新人)	Kōji Ogawa	Hiroshi Ōnogi	Hiroyuki Honda, Toshiaki Satō, Yumenosuke Tokuda & Minoru Okabe	April 4, 2021

=== Season 3 (2021–22) ===
No. overall	No. in season	Title	Directed by	Written by	Animation directed by	Original release date
86	1	"New Start"; Transliteration: "Shinsei" (Japanese: 新生)	Directed by : Miho Hirayama; Storyboarded by : Morio Hatano & Kōji Ogawa	Mizuki Yamada	Tomoaki Kado, Chihiro Saitō, Yūki Tamori, Masakazu Saitō & Keishi Sakai	October 10, 2021
87	2	"Choice"; Transliteration: "Sentaku" (Japanese: 選択)	Maya Asakura	Hiroyuki Yoshino	Ikuko Ito, Tsutomu Ōno & Hiromi Sakamoto	October 17, 2021
88	3	"Strategy"; Transliteration: "Sakusen" (Japanese: 作戦)	Kōji Kawasaki	Hiroshi Ōnogi	Yōichi Ōnishi & Yumenosuke Tokuda	October 24, 2021
89	4	"Secret Plan"; Transliteration: "Hisaku" (Japanese: 秘策)	Kōji Ogawa	Ryunosuke Kingetsu	Yūya Takahashi, Sachi Suzuki & Akira Takeuchi	October 31, 2021
90	5	"Unrivaled"; Transliteration: "Musō" (Japanese: 無双)	Wataru Matsumi	Hiroyuki Yoshino	Hiroyuki Honda, Tsutomu Ōno & Setsuko Nobuzane	November 7, 2021
91	6	"Decision"; Transliteration: "Handan" (Japanese: 判断)	Directed by : Kokoro Kondō; Storyboarded by : Gō Koga	Hiroshi Ōnogi	Tomoaki Kado, Chihiro Saitō, Yūki Tamori, Masakazu Saitō, Keishi Sakai, Ryōtarō Akao, Junko Matsushita & Haruka Oikawa	November 14, 2021
92	7	"Premonition"; Transliteration: "Yokan" (Japanese: 予感)	Directed by : Ayaka Nakata; Storyboarded by : Ayako Hiraike	Ryunosuke Kingetsu	Sara Sakoe, Kei Hyōdō, Miho Sekimoto, Hiroshi Maejima, Keiko Kitayama & Kaori Yoshikawa	November 21, 2021
93	8	"Will"; Transliteration: "Ishi" (Japanese: 意志)	Directed by : Miho Hirayama; Storyboarded by : Miho Hirayama & Morio Hatano	Mizuki Yamada	Ikuko Ito, Yūya Takahashi, Sachi Suzuki, Takurō Sakurai, Fuyumi Toriyama, Setsuko Nobuzane, Tsutomu Ōno & Naoko Masui	November 28, 2021
94	9	"Formidable Opponent"; Transliteration: "Nanteki" (Japanese: 難敵)	Directed by : Wataru Matsumi; Storyboarded by : Yoshifumi Sueda & Wataru Matsumi	Hiroshi Ōnogi	Yōichi Ōnishi, Akira Takeuchi, Yousuke Toyama, Minoru Okabe, Hiroshi Maejima & Yūya Takahashi	December 5, 2021
95	10	"Change of Plans"; Transliteration: "Betsu An" (Japanese: 別案)	Ayako Hiraike	Ryunosuke Kingetsu	Chihiro Saitō, Yūki Tamori, Masakazu Saitō, Keishi Sakai, Ryōtarō Akao, Junko Matsushita, Haruka Oikawa, Hiroyuki Honda & Tamaki Ishii	December 12, 2021
96	11	"Final Round"; Transliteration: "Saishūsen" (Japanese: 最終戦)	Maya Asakura	Ryunosuke Kingetsu	Hiroyuki Koizumi, Setsuko Hakamada, Hiroyuki Honda, Ikuko Ito, Tsutomu Ōno, Hiroshi Maejima & Eisaku Inoue	December 19, 2021
97	12	"Melee"; Transliteration: "Ransen" (Japanese: 乱戦)	Kōji Ogawa	Hiroyuki Yoshino	Yūya Takahashi, Yōichi Ōnishi & Akira Takeuchi	December 26, 2021
98	13	"One-on-One"; Transliteration: "Ichi Tai Ichi" (Japanese: 1対1)	Gō Koga	Hiroyuki Yoshino	Akihiro Ōta	January 9, 2022
99	14	"Resolution"; Transliteration: "Kakugo" (Japanese: 覚悟)	Directed by : Morio Hatano, Miho Hirayama & Kokoro Kondō; Storyboarded by : Morio Hatano	Hiroyuki Yoshino	Toshihisa Kaiya, Yūya Takahashi, Ikuko Ito, Toshiaki Satō, Akihiro Ōta, Hiroyuki Honda, Sachi Suzuki, Hideaki Maniwa & Takumi Yamamoto	January 23, 2022 (Note: This episode was scheduled to air on January 16, 2022, but was delayed as TV Asahi had broadcast special programming regarding the 2022 Hunga Tonga–Hunga Ha'apai eruption and tsunami.)
