= Magic User's Club =

Magical girl anime television series

- Promotional picture for the anime showing the main characters.

魔法使いTai! (Mahō Tsukai Tai!)
- Genre: Magical girl, Magical boy
- Created by: Triangle Staff, Junichi Sato
- Original video animation
- Directed by: Junichi Sato
- Produced by: Masato Terada (1-5); Kazuhiko Ikeguchi (6); Hiroaki Inoue; Shōjirō Abe
- Written by: Akinori Endō; Junichi Sato; Chiaki J. Konaka
- Music by: Michiru Ōshima
- Studio: Triangle Staff
- Licensed by: NA: Right Stuf Inc.
- Released: May 25, 1996 – October 25, 1997
- Episodes: 6
- Manga
- Written by: Junichi Sato
- Illustrated by: Tami Ōta
- Published by: Kadokawa Shoten
- Magazine: Asuka Fantasy DX
- Original run: 1996 – 1998
- Volumes: 4
- Light novel
- Written by: Junichi Sato; Chiaki J. Konaka
- Published by: Fujimi Shobo
- Imprint: Fujimi Fantasia Bunko
- Original run: 1996 – 1998
- Volumes: 4
- Manga
- Written by: Junichi Sato
- Illustrated by: Satomi Akai
- Published by: Fujimi Shobo
- Magazine: Dragon Junior
- Original run: 1999 – 2000
- Volumes: 3
- Anime television series
- Directed by: Junichi Sato
- Produced by: Kazuhiko Ikeguchi
- Written by: Chiaki J. Konaka
- Music by: Michiru Ōshima
- Studio: Madhouse; Triangle Staff
- Licensed by: NA: Right Stuf Inc.
- Original network: WOWOW
- English network: IN: Animax; SEA: Animax Asia
- Original run: July 7, 1999 – October 6, 1999
- Episodes: 13

Magic User's Club (魔法使いTai!, Mahō Tsukai Tai!) is a magical girl/boy anime created by Triangle Staff and Junichi Sato. It was first released as a six-part OVA in 1996 and then a 13-episode TV series in 1999, which was broadcast by WOWOW, and then by the anime television network Animax across its respective networks worldwide, including Southeast Asia, South Asia and other regions. Produced by Bandai Visual, the series is directed by Sato, with Chiaki J. Konaka handling series composition for the TV show, Ikuko Itoh designing the characters and Michiru Ōshima composing the music. There were also two manga series made, a shōjo manga version by Tami Ōta and shōnen manga version by Satomi Akai.

The anime was originally licensed in North America by Media Blasters. The license is currently held by Right Stuf Inc. Funimation is streaming the series on their website in partnership with Nozomi.

== Premise ==
=== OVA series ===
An enormous cylindrical alien spaceship, which people call "the Bell" (釣り鐘, tsurigane), descends upon Earth one day. Multinational military forces attack it, but the Bell's defenses easily vaporize all human weaponry. The story takes place one year afterwards. The Bell, which seems to have no living crew, has begun sending out robotic probes to explore and analyze human civilization and all of the aspects of it. For most of the series, the Bell hovers quietly above the ocean, several miles from Tokyo. It had soon become apparent that the Bell's defenses only destroy whatever attacks it first. As such, most people have now adapted to the Bell's presence on Earth and are once again going about with their everyday lives, just making sure to stay out of the way of the Bell's probes when they pass by. A lot of people, however, due to a message sent by the Bell, believe the Bell may eventually attack and conquer Earth, and are working to figure out a way to stop it.

Kitanohashi High School has a small group of students called "The Magic Users Club". Most people think the five club members only learn how to do regular parlor tricks, but only its members know that they learn how to do real magic. The president of the club, Takeo Takakura, started it when he found a box containing a grimoire in a cave by the ocean. Using the knowledge from the book, he was able to teach the other club members to perform magic. Takeo himself believes that the Bell will eventually attack Earth, and decides to combat the alien "menace" using this magic, despite inadvertently revealing the secret of the Magic Users Club's performing of real magic to a pair of journalists, who also want to stop the Bell, when they witness the club's first foray against it. These two become the only people on the outside to know about the club's secret.

A young girl named Sae Sawanoguchi goes to Kitanohashi High School and belongs to the Magic Users Club, where she learns how to use magic that will soon become trade. The town that she lives in has never exactly been attacked, being in place in the city for a year to date. She has yet to discover the true strength of her magical ability, and because of her unintentional clumsiness, none of her friends realize it either. What would be really helpful to Sae would be that if something were to happen that would let her fine tune her talent, and the club's mission to stop the Bell may be her chance to do that.

=== TV series ===
The Bell has been defeated, its "crew" having retreated into space, but is now a massive cherry tree above the city. The Magic Club must meet once again to solve the problem of the spaceship-turned giant tree, which is blocking off sunlight for the city. A mysterious figure descends from the tree and watches over the members of the club as they continue to deal with magic in their daily lives.

== Characters ==
=== Magic Club ===
Sae.

Sae Sawanoguchi (沢野口 沙絵, Sawanoguchi Sae)

- Voiced by: Hiroko Konishi (Japanese); Misty Daniels (English)

A second-year student at Kitanohashi High School and a new member of the Magic Club, Sae is eager to learn magic, but often has setbacks due to her clumsy nature. She looks up to Takakura as a great mentor. Although she actually has feelings for him beyond that, she is too shy to express them. Of the five members, Sae has the greatest amount of power to utilize, but lacks the training and concentration to fully tap into this potential.
Sae displays a clear ineptitude to flying on a broomstick in the OVA series, but her skills progress and by the TV series, she can fly on different pole-sized items without any problems, even without using her wand.
According to character designer Ikuko Itoh, her own mother was an influence for the character of Sae, who has a similar klutzy nature.

Nanaka.

Nanaka Nakatomi (中富 七香, Nakatomi Nanaka)

- Voiced by: Mayumi Iizuka (Japanese); Lisa Ortiz (English)

A second year and a friend of Sae since childhood. She just wants to be a normal high school girl and gets frustrated with Sae's obsession with the Magic Club, although she is proficient in magic herself. Nanaka has a crush on Aburatsubo but is afraid to admit her feelings because she knows they won't be returned. She describes her family as "all over the place", and though often embarrassed and aggravated by their antics, she loves them dearly.

Akane.

Akane Aikawa (愛川 茜, Aikawa Akane)

- Voiced by: Junko Iwao (Japanese), Nicole Tieri and Stacey Williams (English)

A first year and another new member of the Magic Club. Akane is a spoiled rich girl who often misses going to club meetings in order to go on dates with boyfriends. Using magic comes easily to her. Such is her innate skill that she is able to produce makeshift wands out of ordinary objects, though they are rather primitive and weak compared to her regular wand. The same can't be said for her flying. Akane often uses magic for selfish reasons against what Takakura has taught, which causes Sae to lecture her in several instances. Anything affected solely by her magic "spins" before the spell's true effect come to pass, something which she has no control over.
In the TV series, Akane works as a model and appears in clothing advertisements throughout the city. Her mother is a famous actress.

Takeo Takakura (高倉 武男, Takakura Takeo)

- Voiced by: Masaya Onosaka (Japanese); Jamie McGonnigal (English)

President of the Magic Club and third-year student at Kitanohashi High School. Takakura often has a tendency to show off in front of the girls and has perverted daydreams at inopportune times. He loves Sae, but will not admit his feelings because he is nervous and self-conscious of his position as Sae's mentor and upperclassman.
Hiding from his childhood nemesis, Miyama, Takeo found a magical textbook called the Grimoire, along with the magic wand he later replicated.

Ayanojyo Aburatsubo (油壷 綾之丞, Aburatsubo Ayanojō)

- Voiced by: Takehito Koyasu (Japanese); Kevin T. Collins (English)

A third year and the vice president of the Magic Club. Aburatsubo is homosexual, but only shows affection toward Takakura; he never shows signs of being interested in any other boy. Takakura is uncomfortable with Aburatsubo's flirting, but doesn't think much of it; though Aburatsubo continuously flirts with Takakura, he understands that Takakura will never return his feelings. He has a variety of talents and is involved in many other clubs besides the Magic Club, such as the tennis team and drama club.
The television series establishes that he doesn't have a very good standing towards his mother, who constantly babies him, though he does love her.

=== Other Magicians ===
Jeff (ジェフくん, Jefu-kun)

- Voiced by: Satoru Nakano (Japanese); Michelle Medlin (English)

Jeff is both the name of a mysterious silhouetted magician Sae met when she was a child and a stuffed teddy bear that he gave her. When Sae gets in tough situations, Jeff-kun the teddy bear aids Sae's magic powers. She meets the real Jeff again (only as a silhouette) when the rest of the club are trapped inside the Bell and he gives her the confidence to rescue them. Appears in the OVA, and at the end of the TV series.

Jurika Jinno (仁乃 樹里加, Jinno Jurika)

- Voiced by: Nami Miyahara (Japanese); Michelle Newman (English)

Jurika is a magician that seems interested in the members of the Magic Club and the use of magic, for reasons that are not clear at first. Jurika is highly androgynous, officially male as a student but having a very feminine look for the most part. He has the ability to read and translate the Grimoire that Takeo uses to teach the other Club members, going so far as to identify the Club's copy as "an older version that has mistakes in it".
Jurika is actually a magical construct given life and personality by Sae's fondest wishes and ideals about magic. As a being of pure magic, he has the ability to manipulate his appearance, exist in multiple times and places, read minds, interact in the dreams of others and other numerous abilities. Since he is a byproduct of Sae's mind, he is aware of the personalities and relationships between the Magic User's Club members and utilizes this knowledge to manipulate them into using more magic. At the end of the TV series, he is absorbed back into Sae. Appears only in the TV series.

Miki Mizusawa (水沢 美樹, Mizusawa Miki)

- Voiced by: Miho Yamada (Japanese); Carrie Keranen (English)

Nicknamed "Miki-senpai" (ミッキー先輩, Mikkī-senpai) by Sae. Miki is a friend and former mentor of Sae who lives in England. She was in the Magic User's Club for an unknown amount of time before leaving to England. Sae writes her constantly in the TV series, telling her what has been going on. Miki's father is a "grandmaster" sorcerer/magician based in England and she presumably has trained under him. She has enough magic training to fly without using a broom and can summon a magical serpent to aid her. Appears only in the TV series.

=== Journalists ===
Mitsuru Minowa (箕輪 充, Minowa Mitsuru)

- Voiced by: Akio Ōtsuka (Japanese); Mike Pollock (English)

Minowa is a journalist bent on learning the truth behind the Bell. He investigates the Magic Club to find out if they have any connection with the Bell.

Yoshito Yoshimoto (吉本 吉人, Yoshimoto Yoshito)

- Voiced by: Tomohiro Nishimura (Japanese); Michael Sinterniklaas (English)

Yoshimoto is a photographer and constant sidekick of Minowa, though he doesn't take the Bell issue as seriously as his boss.

=== Manga Club ===
Mizuha Miyama (深山 瑞葉, Miyama Mizuha)

- Voiced by: Rei Sakuma (Japanese); Suzanne Gilad (English)

Miyama is the bossy President of the Manga Club, which is right next door to the Magic Club. She uses her enormous breasts to intimidate Takakura, and she's been teasing him since childhood. Miyama is constantly trying to dissolve the Magic Club and keeps taking back the space that was loaned to the club.
In the OVA series, Miyama's experience from being examined by the Bell (due to a spell cast on her by Akane) goes completely to her head and makes her declare herself as the planet Earth's "representative".
She secretly harbors feelings for Takakura, despite her incessant tormenting of him. When a truth spell was cast on her, she confessed her true feelings about him, as well as the fact that she didn't actually enjoy tormenting him as a child. Also, in the TV series, she devotes a manga project with allegories to Takakura.

Katsuhito Kubo (久保 克人, Kubo Katsuhito)

- Voiced by: Akira Shirai

Kubo only appears in the OVA series and is a faculty member who is club supervisor of the Magic Club and the Manga Club. He doesn't try to resolve any issues between the students, saying "Education is love". Kubo has a habit of giving his business card to everyone he talks to.

Rinpun (リンプン, Rinpun) & Kojin (コージン, Kōjin)

- Voiced by: Kazuya Ichijou (Japanese (OVA)), Yasuhiro Takato (Japanese (TV)), Michelle Newman (English)

They are two boys who are Miyama's constant lackeys. Rinpun & Kojin do all kinds of menial tasks for Miyama and are sometimes called to spy on others for her.

=== Family ===
Saki Sawanoguchi (沢野口 早紀, Sawanoguchi Saki)

- Voice by: Atsuko Tanaka (Japanese (OVA)), Kazusa Murai (Japanese (TV)), Shannon Conley (English)

Sae's older sister who looks after her in Tokyo. Saki has problems with a boyfriend in the TV series, though they reconcile near the end. It's never defined whether or not she has any knowledge of the goings on in the Magic User's Club.

Sawako Sawanoguchi (沢野口 佐和子, Sawanoguchi Sawako)

- Voiced by: Kumiko Takizawa (Japanese); Suzanne Gilad (English)

She is Sae's mother, a woman with an energetic personality. Sae's parents own a ranch in Hokkaidō.

Sakae Sawanoguchi (沢野口 栄, Sawanoguchi Sakae)

- Voiced by: Kouji Kurose

He is Sae's father, seemingly a man of few words. Sae's hairstyle was inherited from him.

Naoki Nakatomi (中富 直紀, Nakatomi Naoki)

- Voiced by: Kouki Miyata (Japanese); Michelle Newman (English)

He is Nanaka's younger brother, who is bratty and tends to annoy her.

Naoko Nakatomi (中富 菜緒子, Nakatomi Naoko)

- Voiced by: Urara Takano (Japanese); Camille Diamond (English)

She is Nanaka's mother, who runs a health food store. She also grows her own vegetables. Nanaka is frustrated when she doesn't seem to care about attending parent-teacher meetings, and when she acts in an embarrassing fashion when she does.

Azusa Amano (天野 梓, Amano Azusa)

- Voiced by: Gara Takashima (Japanese); Lisa Zlotnick (English)

She is Akane's mother, who is a famous actress. Though somewhat critical of her daughter's acting, the two seem to genuinely enjoy each other's company.

Takako Takakura (高倉 貴子, Takakura Takako)

- Voiced by: Sawa Ishige (Japanese); Amy Fitts (English)

She is Takeo's younger sister. Takako seems annoyed by her brother's eccentricities and makes sure he does regular exercise routines.

Akiko Aburatsubo (油壺 亜希子, Aburatsubo Akiko)

- Voiced by: You Inoue (Japanese); Deborah S. Craig (English)

She is Aburatsubo's mother, who treats Aburatsubo very childishly and affectionately. Aburatsubo can't stand her.

=== Aburatsubo Safety Committee ===
Michiko Mikote (御小手 ミチコ, Mikote Michiko)

- Voiced by: Umi Tenjin (Japanese); Amy Fitts (English)

She is the President of the "Aburatsubo Safety Committee", a group of girls who are obsessively devoted to Aburatsubo in the TV series. Michiko is the most confrontational and jealous of the girls, and she arrogantly insists that only she may call Aburatsubo "Aya-sama" ("His Ayaness" in the English dub).

Madoka Masuko (増子 まどか, Masuko Madoka)

- Voiced by: Nanae Katou (Japanese); Camille Diamond (English)

Madoka is another member of the committee who is highly obsessed with Aburatsubo. She has the habit of breaking the rule against calling Aburatsubo "Aya-sama" and gets physically assaulted by Michiko when she does so.

Hikaru Hirasaka (平坂 光, Hirasaka Hikaru)

- Voiced by: Momoyo Kodama (Japanese); Elizabeth Wood (English)

Hikaru is another member of the committee who has long bangs. She sometimes goes on small tasks for Michiko, like checking in the men's bathroom whenever Aburatsubo can't be found. She often dodges Michiko's back swings when she assaults Madoka.

== Episodes ==
=== OVA ===
The OVA series had six episodes released from 1996 to 1997. The series was produced by Triangle Staff for Bandai Visual. The incidental music was composed by Michiru Ōshima. The opening theme song, "Pushing the Limit, Follow You" (背伸びをして Follow You, Senobi o Shite Follow You), was performed by Mahōtsukai Tai (the three main female voice actors), composed and arranged by Toshiro Yabuki, and had lyrics by Miho Matsuba. The ending theme, "See You Tomorrow" (またあした, Mata Ashita), was performed by Masami, composed by Masami (as "Masami Okui") and Yabuki, arranged by Itaru Watanabe, and had lyrics by Matsuba.

| No. | Title | Directed by | Written by | Original release date |
|---|---|---|---|---|
| 1 | "I'll Follow You"; Transliteration: "Tsurigane to Takakura-senpai to Soratobu Mahō" (Japanese: ツリガネと高倉先輩と空とぶ魔法) | Yoshihiro Ueda | Akinori Endō; Junichi Sato | 27 May 1996 |
| 2 | "We Leave a Magic Club"; Transliteration: "Kyodai Bēgoma to Mizuha-sama to Shippai Mahō" (Japanese: 巨大ベーゴマと瑞葉先輩としっぱい魔法) | Atsuko Kase | Chiaki J. Konaka | 25 July 1996 |
| 3 | "Magic Is So Easy, Isn't It?"; Transliteration: "Taketonbo to Akane-chan to Ikenai Mahō" (Japanese: タケトンボと茜ちゃんといけない魔法) | Yoshihiro Ueda | Chiaki J. Konaka | 25 October 1996 |
| 4 | "I Wish You... Wh... What?"; Transliteration: "Umi to Dōkutsu to Majikku Pāti" (Japanese: 海と洞窟とマジックパーティ) | Atsuko Kase | Chiaki J. Konaka | 25 February 1997 |
| 5 | "I See We Are the Same"; Transliteration: "Nanaka to Aburatsubo-senpai to Kokuhaku Mahō?" (Japanese: 七香と油壷センパイと告白魔法?) | Kazuhisa Takenouchi | Chiaki J. Konaka | 25 July 1997 |
| 6 | "Well, Believe Yourself"; Transliteration: "Sae to Jefu-kun to Ōmahō" (Japanese: 沙絵とジェフくんと大魔法) | Junichi Sato | Chiaki J. Konaka | 25 October 1997 |

=== TV ===
The animated television series had thirteen episodes and aired on WOWOW from 7 July until 6 October 1997. It was produced by Madhouse in cooperation with Triangle Staff. The incidental music was composed by Michiru Ōshima. The opening theme song was "I Wanna Do More", which was composed, arranged, written, and performed by Amii Ozaki. The ending theme was "Should I Do?", also composed, arranged, written, and performed by Ozaki.

| No. | Title | Directed by | Written by | Original release date |
|---|---|---|---|---|
| 1 | "Sae, the Magic Club, and the Cherry Blossom Tree"; Transliteration: "Sae to, Mahō Kurabu to, Sakura no Ki" (Japanese: 沙絵と、魔法クラブと、桜の木) | Junichi Sato; Shogo Koumoto | Chiaki J. Konaka | 7 July 1999 |
| 2 | "Nanaka, a Cake, and the Dangerous Evening"; Transliteration: "Nanaka to, Kēki to, Kiken na Yoru" (Japanese: 七香と、ケーキと、危険な夜) | Kiyoko Sayama | Michiko Yokote | 14 July 1999 |
| 3 | "Aburatsubo, Morning Face, and the Parent Teacher Meetings"; Transliteration: "Aburatsubo-senpai to, Asagao to, Oyako Mendan" (Japanese: 油壺先輩と、朝顔と、親子面談) | Ryūtarō Nakamura | Michiko Yokote | 21 July 1999 |
| 4 | "Sae, The Bathroom, and the Door"; Transliteration: "Sae to, Furoba to, Tobira no Mukō" (Japanese: 沙絵と、風呂場と、扉の向こう) | Kazuhisa Takenouchi; Jōhei Matsuura | Sadayuki Murai | 28 July 1999 |
| 5 | "Akane, the Hiccups, and a Strange Relationship"; Transliteration: "Akane-chan to, Shakkuri to, Ayashii Kankei" (Japanese: 茜ちゃんと、しゃっくりと、アヤシイ関係) | Shogo Koumoto | Sadayuki Murai | 4 August 1999 |
| 6 | "Takakura, Origami, and the Secret Date"; Transliteration: "Takakura-senpai to, Yakko to, Himitsu no Dēto" (Japanese: 高倉先輩と、やっこと、秘密のデート) | Yasuhiro Geshi | Michiko Yokote | 18 August 1999 |
| 7 | "Sae, a Tomato, and the Dance of the Paint Brush"; Transliteration: "Sae to, Tomato to, Efude no Dansu" (Japanese: 沙絵と、トマトと、絵筆のダンス) | Kiyoko Sayama | Chiaki J. Konaka | 25 August 1999 |
| 8 | "Alice, Railroad Tracks, and the Cracker"; Transliteration: "Arisu to, Fumikiri to, Sōsu Senbei" (Japanese: アリスと、踏切と、ソースせんべい) | Yoshitaka Fujimoto | Sadayuki Murai | 1 September 1999 |
| 9 | "Kimonos, Short Shorts, and the Age of Joy"; Transliteration: "Furisode to, Tanpan to, Hana no Jidai" (Japanese: 振り袖と、短パンと、華の時代) | Shogo Koumoto | Michiko Yokote | 8 September 1999 |
| 10 | "Snow, the Colt, and a First Kiss"; Transliteration: "Yuki to, Kouma to, Fāsuto Kissu" (Japanese: 雪と、子馬と、ファースト・キッス) | Jōhei Matsuura | Chiaki J. Konaka | 15 September 1999 |
| 11 | "Akane, the Mirror, and the End of the Year Sale"; Transliteration: "Akane-chan to, Kagami to, Saimatsu Bāgen" (Japanese: 茜ちゃんと、鏡と、歳末バーゲン) | Tadao Ōkubo | Sadayuki Murai | 22 September 1999 |
| 12 | "The Kite, the Whirlwind, and Micky"; Transliteration: "Tako to, Inazuma to, Mikkī-senpai" (Japanese: タコと、稲妻と、ミッキー先輩) | Shogo Koumoto | Michiko Yokote | 29 September 1999 |
| 13 | "Sae's Magic, Sae's Feelings, Forever"; Transliteration: "Sae no Mahō, Sae no Kimochi, Itsumade mo Zutto" (Japanese: 沙絵の魔法、沙絵の気持ち、いつまでもずっと) | Junichi Sato; Nanako Shimazaki | Chiaki J. Konaka | 6 October 1999 |
