= World Trigger season 3 =

Season of television series

World Trigger
- Season 3
- Cover art for the first home media volume of the season, featuring Tamakoma Second
- No. of episodes: 14

Release
- Original network: TV Asahi
- Original release: October 10, 2021 – January 23, 2022

Season chronology
- ← Previous; Season 2

World Trigger is a Japanese anime television series based on Daisuke Ashihara's manga series of the same name. During Jump Festa '21, it was announced that the series would receive a third season. The third season aired on TV Asahi's NUMAnimation programming block from October 10, 2021, to January 23, 2022. On December 23, 2021, two additional episodes were announced for January 2022. The opening theme song is "Time Factor" (タイムファクター) performed by Kami wa Saikoro o Furanai (神はサイコロを振らない), while the ending theme song is "Ungai Dōkei" (雲外憧憬, lit. 'Yearning to Be Above the Clouds') performed by Fantastic Youth.

On September 28, 2022, Toei Animation announced via Twitter that the English dub of both seasons two and three would begin streaming on October 4, 2022.

== Episodes ==
No. overall	No. in season	Title (Note: English translated titles are taken from Crunchyroll.)	Directed by (Note: Production staff information is taken from the ending credits of each episode.)	Written by	Animation directed by	Original release date
86	1	"New Start"; Transliteration: "Shinsei" (Japanese: 新生)	Directed by : Miho Hirayama; Storyboarded by : Morio Hatano & Kōji Ogawa	Mizuki Yamada	Tomoaki Kado, Chihiro Saitō, Yūki Tamori, Masakazu Saitō & Keishi Sakai	October 10, 2021
87	2	"Choice"; Transliteration: "Sentaku" (Japanese: 選択)	Maya Asakura	Hiroyuki Yoshino	Ikuko Ito, Tsutomu Ōno & Hiromi Sakamoto	October 17, 2021
88	3	"Strategy"; Transliteration: "Sakusen" (Japanese: 作戦)	Kōji Kawasaki	Hiroshi Ōnogi	Yōichi Ōnishi & Yumenosuke Tokuda	October 24, 2021
89	4	"Secret Plan"; Transliteration: "Hisaku" (Japanese: 秘策)	Kōji Ogawa	Ryunosuke Kingetsu	Yūya Takahashi, Sachi Suzuki & Akira Takeuchi	October 31, 2021
90	5	"Unrivaled"; Transliteration: "Musō" (Japanese: 無双)	Wataru Matsumi	Hiroyuki Yoshino	Hiroyuki Honda, Tsutomu Ōno & Setsuko Nobuzane	November 7, 2021
91	6	"Decision"; Transliteration: "Handan" (Japanese: 判断)	Directed by : Kokoro Kondō; Storyboarded by : Gō Koga	Hiroshi Ōnogi	Tomoaki Kado, Chihiro Saitō, Yūki Tamori, Masakazu Saitō, Keishi Sakai, Ryōtarō Akao, Junko Matsushita & Haruka Oikawa	November 14, 2021
92	7	"Premonition"; Transliteration: "Yokan" (Japanese: 予感)	Directed by : Ayaka Nakata; Storyboarded by : Ayako Hiraike	Ryunosuke Kingetsu	Sara Sakoe, Kei Hyōdō, Miho Sekimoto, Hiroshi Maejima, Keiko Kitayama & Kaori Yoshikawa	November 21, 2021
93	8	"Will"; Transliteration: "Ishi" (Japanese: 意志)	Directed by : Miho Hirayama; Storyboarded by : Miho Hirayama & Morio Hatano	Mizuki Yamada	Ikuko Ito, Yūya Takahashi, Sachi Suzuki, Takurō Sakurai, Fuyumi Toriyama, Setsuko Nobuzane, Tsutomu Ōno & Naoko Masui	November 28, 2021
94	9	"Formidable Opponent"; Transliteration: "Nanteki" (Japanese: 難敵)	Directed by : Wataru Matsumi; Storyboarded by : Yoshifumi Sueda & Wataru Matsumi	Hiroshi Ōnogi	Yōichi Ōnishi, Akira Takeuchi, Yousuke Toyama, Minoru Okabe, Hiroshi Maejima & Yūya Takahashi	December 5, 2021
95	10	"Change of Plans"; Transliteration: "Betsu An" (Japanese: 別案)	Ayako Hiraike	Ryunosuke Kingetsu	Chihiro Saitō, Yūki Tamori, Masakazu Saitō, Keishi Sakai, Ryōtarō Akao, Junko Matsushita, Haruka Oikawa, Hiroyuki Honda & Tamaki Ishii	December 12, 2021
96	11	"Final Round"; Transliteration: "Saishūsen" (Japanese: 最終戦)	Maya Asakura	Ryunosuke Kingetsu	Hiroyuki Koizumi, Setsuko Hakamada, Hiroyuki Honda, Ikuko Ito, Tsutomu Ōno, Hiroshi Maejima & Eisaku Inoue	December 19, 2021
97	12	"Melee"; Transliteration: "Ransen" (Japanese: 乱戦)	Kōji Ogawa	Hiroyuki Yoshino	Yūya Takahashi, Yōichi Ōnishi & Akira Takeuchi	December 26, 2021
98	13	"One-on-One"; Transliteration: "Ichi Tai Ichi" (Japanese: 1対1)	Gō Koga	Hiroyuki Yoshino	Akihiro Ōta	January 9, 2022
99	14	"Resolution"; Transliteration: "Kakugo" (Japanese: 覚悟)	Directed by : Morio Hatano, Miho Hirayama & Kokoro Kondō; Storyboarded by : Morio Hatano	Hiroyuki Yoshino	Toshihisa Kaiya, Yūya Takahashi, Ikuko Ito, Toshiaki Satō, Akihiro Ōta, Hiroyuki Honda, Sachi Suzuki, Hideaki Maniwa & Takumi Yamamoto	January 23, 2022 (Note: This episode was scheduled to air on January 16, 2022, but was delayed as TV Asahi had broadcast special programming regarding the 2022 Hunga Tonga–Hunga Ha'apai eruption and tsunami.)
