= World Trigger season 1 =

Season of television series

World Trigger
- Season 1
- Cover art for the first home media volume of the season, featuring Yūma Kuga (left) and Osamu Mikumo (right)
- No. of episodes: 73

Release
- Original network: TV Asahi
- Original release: October 5, 2014 – April 3, 2016

Season chronology
- Next → Season 2

World Trigger is a Japanese anime television series based on Daisuke Ashihara's manga series of the same name. The series was produced by Toei Animation and broadcast on TV Asahi from October 5, 2014, to April 3, 2016. The series is directed by Mitsuru Hongo with series composition by Hiroyuki Yoshino. Toshihisa Kaiya and Hitomi Tsuruta are the character designers and animation directors, and the music is composed by Kenji Kawai. The season was originally slated to run for 50 episodes, but ended up having a total of 73.

In Q3 2015, the World Trigger Summer Festival 2015 event announced World Trigger: Isekai Kara no Tōbōsha, a brand new series with an original story not presented in the World Trigger manga, and with new characters and concepts. This "new series" actually ended up being the "Fugitive Arc" of the existing anime series, which ran from episodes 49 to 63. On March 7, 2016, it was confirmed that the World Trigger anime series would end, after it was announced that TV Asahi would be replacing the time slot airing it with sports programming. The first opening theme song is "Girigiri" (ギリギリ; lit. 'Borderline') performed by Sonar Pocket. The second opening theme song is "Ashita no Hikari" (アシタノヒカリ; lit. 'Light of Tomorrow') performed by AAA. The third opening theme song is "Dream Trigger" (ドリームトリガー) performed by Pile.

In North America, Toei announced in July 2015 that they would be producing an English dub with Ocean Productions. The series began airing in the United States on Primo TV on January 16, 2017. The English dub became available on Crunchyroll on February 11, 2020.

== Episodes ==
No. overall	No. in season	Title	Directed by	Written by	Animation directed by	Original release date
1	1	"Visitor from the Other World"; Transliteration: "I Sekai kara no Raihōsha" (Japanese: 異世界からの来訪者)	Mitsuru Hongo	Hiroyuki Yoshino	Yūji Hakamada	October 5, 2014
In Mikado City's junior high school, a transferee named Yūma Kuga, who was late on his first day in the class, meets his classmate Osamu Mikumo. Kuga gets in trouble with the bullies in their class and is invited to an abandoned lot inside the Forbidden Zone, with Mikumo accompanying him. As the bullies are about to retaliate Kuga, a portal opens in the area, and a being from the other side, called "Neighbor", emerges. Mikumo then reveals himself to be an agent of Border, an organization that protects the city from Neighbors, and he saves the bullies from the attack using a Trigger weapon but gets pinned down by the Neighbor. Kuga then activates his Trigger and saves Mikumo, revealing that he is also a Neighbor.
2	2	"Neighbor and Trion Soldier"; Transliteration: "Neibā to Torion-hei" (Japanese: 近界民(ネイバー)とトリオン兵)	Directed by : Shigeru Ueda; Storyboarded by : Ken Koyama	Hiroyuki Yoshino	Kazuyuki Kobayashi & Chūichi Iguchi	October 12, 2014
A Border squad led by Shūji Miwa arrives at the scene where they find the bullies and the defeated Neighbor. They wonder who defeated it as they are the first unit to arrive. Meanwhile, Kuga explains to Mikumo that the Neighbor was a Trion Soldier created by humans living beyond the portal. Mikumo decides to look out for Kuga, who naively waves a bundle of money in the crowd. It attracts the attention of thugs wanting to get a hand of his money, but Kuga outwits them.
3	3	"Osamu Mikumo's Ability"; Transliteration: "Mikumo Osamu no Jitsuryoku" (Japanese: 三雲修の実力)	Directed by : Kazuya Karasawa; Storyboarded by : Kōhei Kureta	Hiroyuki Yoshino	Yasuhiro Namatame	October 19, 2014
A portal opens at the school and combat-type Trion Soldiers, called Marmod, emerge. Despite Kuga noting his limited abilities, Mikumo decides to protect the school. He is pinned down by Marmods, but Kuga rescues him using Mikumo's Trigger, which reveals to be for training only. After the battle, Kuga's Trion Soldier and chaperone named Replica introduces himself to Mikumo and explains how Kuga manages to use his training Trigger to become powerful enough to defeat the Neighbors. Kuga decides to give the credit to Mikumo as they come out of the rubble. A Border squad led by Jun Arashiyama arrives at the scene late, with him commending Mikumo for saving the school, but another agent, Ai Kitora, demands Mikumo to be punished for using his Trigger outside his rank.
4	4	"Ai Kitora, A-Rank No.5 Agent"; Transliteration: "Ē-kyū Faibu-i・Arashiyama-tai no Kitora Ai" (Japanese: A級5位・嵐山隊の木虎藍)	Yoshiki Kawasaki	Yuuichi Nomura	Eisaku Inoue	November 2, 2014
Kitora pushes Mikumo to be punished for using his in-training Trigger outside his current C-rank status, but Kuga berates her. Later, she waits for Mikumo to escort him to the Border headquarters. As Kitora reveals to him and Kuga about the irregular opening of portals around the city, a bomber-type Trion Soldier, called Ilgar, emerges from a portal. She intercepts Ilgar, while Mikumo decides to help evacuate the area.
5	5	"Power Elite, Yūichi Jin"; Transliteration: "Jitsuryoku-ha Erīto・Jin Yūichi" (Japanese: 実力派エリート・迅悠一)	Mitsuru Hongo	Natsuko Takahashi	Toshihisa Kaiya	November 9, 2014
Kitora keeps fighting the Ilgar while Mikumo continues to evacuate the city both get help from Kuga discreetly. The Ilgar is defeated without casualties. Kitora thinks it is Mikumo that helped. Meanwhile Jin delt with other portals that opened. Mikumo and Kitora finally get to headquarters. The higher ups talk about Mikumo's transgression and he gets promoted to rank B so it won't be an issue. He's then drafted by Jin who was at the meeting to help with the increase in neighbors appearing outside the restricted zone. He's also placed under surveillance as they suspect he has been in contact with a neighbor.
6	6	"Chika Amatori's Side Effect"; Transliteration: "Amatori Chika no Saido Efekuto" (Japanese: 雨取千佳のサイドエフェクト)	Kimitoshi Chioka	Masahiro Yokotani	Masahiro Naoi	November 16, 2014
Jin meets Mikumo after detering the A team from tracking them while on mission. The 2 meet Kuga at the site of the first Neighbor that Kuga took down. Jin uses his ability to tell the future and knows Kuga is a very powerful Neighbor. Kuga had just found out what the issue with the gates popping up outside the restricted area. It was spie trion soldiers in the millions so Jin sent the word out to everyone so all squads even lvl c could help since they don't attack.
7	7	"Miwa Squad's Assault"; Transliteration: "Miwa-tai no Kyōshū" (Japanese: 三輪隊の強襲)	Directed by : Kazuya Karasawa; Storyboarded by : Junji Shimizu	Hiroyuki Yoshino	Noboru Koizumi	November 23, 2014
Kuga meets Chika while they both wait for someone. While waiting Chika tries to teach Kuga how to ride a bicycle. Chika runs when a neighbor appears. Kuga saves Chika and Mikumo defeats the Neighbor without help for the first time. Turns out both were waiting for Mikumo. Mikumo wanted to know why Neighbors were after Chika. Chika has a large amount of trion. Kuga gets discovered by the A team that was following Mikumo and attack him trying to kill him.
8	8	"Black Trigger"; Transliteration: "Burakku Torigā" (Japanese: ブラックトリガー)	Directed by : Akihiro Nakamura; Storyboarded by : Takeshi Mori	Yuuichi Nomura	Gen Sato	November 30, 2014
The fight between Kuga and the A team continues. They managed to snipe of one of his arms but he manages to incapacitate 2 of 4 of the team... Jin gives a warning to the sniper that had a shot and told him not to mess with him you don't want him angry. The fight ended there and they all return to head quarters while Kuga and Chika wait together. You see Jin and Mikumo telling the council that the Neighbor has a black Trigger. They want to send Jin to Kill him except his district director.
9	9	"The Organization Known as Border"; Transliteration: "Bōdā to Iu Soshiki" (Japanese: ボーダーという組織)	Jun Kamiya	Natsuko Takahashi	Yūki Kawashima	December 7, 2014
Chika and Kuga are seen sharing their back story. Chika found out there's a possibility that her brother and her friend that were Snatched by neighbors could still be alive. Jin is ordered to get the trigger by his director but he doesn't ask him to kill Kuga. There's also another one on the council not opposed to negotiating with Kuga but they are surprised when they hear his name. They knew his father, he was one of the founders of border. So instead they send Jin and Mikumo to find out if he really is Yugo Kuga's son
10	10	"Tamakoma Branch"; Transliteration: "Tamakoma Shibu" (Japanese: 玉狛支部)	Directed by : Shigeru Ueda; Storyboarded by : Takeshi Mori	Masahiro Yokotani	Hitomi Tsuruta	December 14, 2014
Yuma's background is revealed more and he is invited to join the Border Agency's Tamakoma Branch. He eventually agrees on the condition that Osamu and Chika join with him and Osamu is Captain.
11	11	"Each One's Determination"; Transliteration: "Sorezore no Ketsui" (Japanese: それぞれの決意)	Ken Koyama	Hiroyuki Yoshino	Yūji Hakamada	December 21, 2014
Yuma revealed why he came to this world. Chika's determined to join Border so she can go to the other world to find her friend and her brother.
12	12	"A-Rank Agents of Tamakoma"; Transliteration: "Tamakoma no Ē-kyū Taiin" (Japanese: 玉狛のA級隊員)	Yoshiki Kawasaki	Natsuko Takahashi	Yasuhiro Namatame	December 28, 2014
Osamu, Chika and Yuma meet Takoma's A team and their trainers. They also set their sight on joining the expedition force but first they will need to win the rank wars and for that be rank A or B agents.
13	13	"Border's Top Teams"; Transliteration: "Bōdā Toppu Chīmu" (Japanese: ボーダートップチーム)	Mitsuru Hongo	Hiroyuki Yoshino	Toshihisa Kaiya	January 11, 2015
Yuichi and Yuma train together. Meanwhile at HQ some of the other faction leader are beginning to fear the power gathering at Tamakoma Branch and make plans to steal Yuma's black Trigger.
14	14	"No. 1 Attacker, Kei Tachikawa"; Transliteration: "Nanbā Wan Atakkā・Tachikawa Kei" (Japanese: NO.1アタッカー・太刀川慶)	Akihiro Nakamura	Hiroyuki Yoshino	Eisaku Inoue	January 18, 2015
The Battle between Jin and the top A rank squads starts. Jin help from the Arashiyama squad another A rank squad. Jin activates his black Trigger Fujin.
15	15	"Black Trigger, Fūjin"; Transliteration: "Burakku Torigā・Fūjin" (Japanese: ブラックトリガー・風刃(ふうじん))	Kazuya Karasawa	Natsuko Takahashi	Noboru Koizumi	January 25, 2015
The battle between jin and his allies against the HQ A squads rages on. Fujin potential is revealed. Meanwhile training is still going on for Osamu's squad.
16	16	"The Future Moves Forward"; Transliteration: "Ugokidasu Mirai" (Japanese: 動き出す未来)	Yutaka Tsuchida	Masahiro Yokotani	Masahiro Naoi	February 8, 2015
Jin and the Arashiyama Unit repel the enemy. Headquarters gets nervous from the news but the arrival of Jin upsets everything with an unusual solution.
17	17	"Border Official Enlistment"; Transliteration: "Bōdā Seishikinyuutai" (Japanese: ボーダー正式入隊)	Jun Kamiya	Yuuichi Nomura	Yūki Kawashima & Kiichi Takaoka	February 15, 2015
Yuma and Chika are officially initiated into the border agency and are explained how to get point to get higher rank. Yuma is noticed by the best score he gets and Chika by her unusual level of trion. Kazama challenges Osamu to a battle.
18	18	"Osamu Mikumo vs. Sōya Kazama"; Transliteration: "Mikumo Osamu bāsasu Kazama Sōya" (Japanese: 三雲修VS風間蒼也)	Directed by : Shigeru Ueda; Storyboarded by : Takeshi Mori	Masahiro Yokotani	Yūji Hakamada	February 22, 2015
Kazama defeats Osamu repeatedly except for the last battle which ends in a tie. They also learn that Jin gave up Fujin so that Yuma could join without causing a war between Branches.
19	19	"Rank War! Shun Midorikawa's Plot"; Transliteration: "Ranku-sen! Midorikawa Shun no Sakuryaku" (Japanese: ランク戦!緑川駿の策略)	Hiroyuki Kakudō	Hiroyuki Yoshino	Yasuhiro Namatame	March 1, 2015
Osamu doesn't know how to deal with his reputation of the guy who tied with Kazama and is challenged by a fellow agent to a rank war. Osamu looses badly and Yuma challenges the agent seeing through the boys scheme.
20	20	"Clash! Yūma vs. Midorikawa"; Transliteration: "Gekitotsu! Yūma bāsasu Midorikawa" (Japanese: 激突！遊真VS緑川)	Ken Koyama	Natsuko Takahashi	Masahiro Naoi	March 8, 2015
Yuma and Shun Midorikawa's fight begins. Yuma quietly rages over how Shun humiliated Osamu by defeating that badly. Yuma decides to teach Shun a lesson in overconfidence. Meanwhile headquarters discusses a potential invasion from a country from the other world. They decide to ask for Yuma's help.
21	21	"Neighbors' World"; Transliteration: "Neibā no Sekai" (Japanese: 近界民(ネイバー)の世界)	Yoshiki Kawasaki	Masahiro Yokotani	Setsuko Nobuzane & Hideki Araki	March 15, 2015
after being summoned by the top brass Yuma and Osamu are tasked with helping them in the upcoming invasion. Yuma reveals replica and Replica gives them information about the neighborhood and which potential countries could attack. The brass comes up with a strategy based on this information.
22	22	"The Large-Scale Invasion Begins"; Transliteration: "Daikibo Shinkō Kaishi" (Japanese: 大規模侵攻開始)	Directed by : Akihiro Nakamura; Storyboarded by : Takeshi Mori	Hiroyuki Yoshino	Francis Kaneda & Joey Calangian	March 22, 2015
the Neighbor's invasion begins. The Battle seem in Border's favor until a new Trion soldier (Rabbit) emerges from the other defeated trion soldiers. Its purpose is to kidnap Trigger user.
23	23	"The Holy Land, Aftokrator"; Transliteration: "Kami no Kuni Afutokuratoru" (Japanese: 神の国アフトクラトル)	Kimitoshi Chioka	Yuuichi Nomura	Noboru Koizumi	March 29, 2015
24	24	"Meeden's Baby Birds"; Transliteration: "Mīden no Hinadori" (Japanese: 玄界(ミデン)の雛鳥)	Yutaka Tsuchida	Natsuko Takahashi	Eisaku Inoue	April 5, 2015
25	25	"The Most Powerful Squad in Border"; Transliteration: "Bōdā Saikyō no Butai" (Japanese: ボーダー最強の部隊)	Jun Kamiya	Hiroyuki Yoshino	Kiichi Takaoka, Tōru Yoshida & Sayumi Yokoyama	April 12, 2015
26	26	"A Fierce Fight! Enedora vs. Kazama Squad"; Transliteration: "Gekitō! Enedora bāsasu Kazama-tai" (Japanese: 激闘！エネドラVS風間隊)	Hiroyuki Kakudō	Hiroyuki Yoshino	Yūji Hakamada	April 19, 2015
27	27	"Border on the Counterattack"; Transliteration: "Hangeki no Bōdā" (Japanese: 反撃のボーダー)	Directed by : Shigeru Ueda; Storyboarded by : Mitsuru Hongo	Yuuichi Nomura	Yasuhiro Namatame & Eisaku Inoue	April 26, 2015
28	28	"The Organon User"; Transliteration: "Oruganon no Tsukaite" (Japanese: 星の杖(オルガノン)の使い手)	Directed by : Mana Uchiyama; Storyboarded by : Takeshi Mori	Natsuko Takahashi	Masahiro Naoi	May 3, 2015
29	29	"Crossroads of Fate"; Transliteration: "Unmei no Bunkiten" (Japanese: 運命の分岐点)	Ken Koyama	Hiroyuki Yoshino	Yōichi Ōnishi	May 10, 2015
30	30	"The Enemy Captain, Hyrein"; Transliteration: "Tekishō Hairein" (Japanese: 敵将ハイレイン)	Yoshiki Kawasaki	Masahiro Yokotani	Setsuko Nobuzane, Eikichi Takahashi & Noel Añonuevo	May 17, 2015
31	31	"Osamu Mikumo's Determination"; Transliteration: "Mikumo Osamu no Kakugo" (Japanese: 三雲修の覚悟)	Directed by : Yutaka Tsuchida; Storyboarded by : Hiroyuki Kakudō	Yuuichi Nomura	Noboru Koizumi	May 24, 2015
32	32	"Implacable Enedora"; Transliteration: "Shūnen no Enedora" (Japanese: 執念のエネドラ)	Directed by : Akihiro Nakamura; Storyboarded by : Takeshi Mori	Yuuichi Nomura	Yūji Hakamada	May 31, 2015
33	33	"Terror of Hyrein"; Transliteration: "Hairein no Kyōfu" (Japanese: ハイレインの恐怖)	Jun Kamiya	Hiroyuki Yoshino	Kiichi Takaoka	June 7, 2015
34	34	"A Fierce Showdown! The Fight of the Best"; Transliteration: "Gekitō Kecchaku! Saikyō no Tatakai" (Japanese: 激闘決着！最強の戦い)	Directed by : Kazuya Karasawa; Storyboarded by : Takeshi Mori	Natsuko Takahashi	Eisaku Inoue	June 14, 2015
35	35	"The End of the Battle"; Transliteration: "Tatakai no Hate ni" (Japanese: 戦いの果てに)	Directed by : Yoshiki Kawasaki; Storyboarded by : Kimitoshi Chioka & Yoshiki Kawasaki	Masahiro Yokotani	Yasuhiro Namatame, Megumi Yamashita, Naoki Murakami & Nobuhiro Masuda	June 21, 2015
36	36	"The Have-Not"; Transliteration: "Motazaru-mono" (Japanese: 持たざる者)	Mitsuru Hongo	Yuuichi Nomura	Masahiro Naoi	June 28, 2015
37	37	"Hero and Partner"; Transliteration: "Hīrō to Aibō" (Japanese: ヒーローと相棒)	Shigeru Ueda	Hiroyuki Yoshino	Yōichi Ōnishi	July 5, 2015
38	38	"B-Rank Wars Begin"; Transliteration: "Bī-kyū Rankusen Kaimaku" (Japanese: B級ランク戦開幕)	Kōnosuke Uda	Natsuko Takahashi	Noboru Koizumi	July 19, 2015
39	39	"Suwa Squad and Arafune Squad"; Transliteration: "Suwa-tai to Arafune-tai" (Japanese: 諏訪隊と荒船隊)	Yutaka Tsuchida	Masahiro Yokotani	Setsuko Nobuzane & Eikichi Takahashi	July 26, 2015
40	40	"Start-Up! Mikumo Squad"; Transliteration: "Shidō! Mikumo-tai" (Japanese: 始動！三雲隊)	Jun Kamiya	Yuuichi Nomura	Kiichi Takaoka	August 2, 2015
41	41	"An Impertinent Rookie"; Transliteration: "Namaikina Rūkī" (Japanese: 生意気な新人(ルーキー))	Directed by : Mana Uchiyama; Storyboarded by : Takeshi Mori	Hiroyuki Yoshino	Yūji Hakamada	August 9, 2015
42	42	"Kō Murakami of Suzunari First"; Transliteration: "Suzunari Daiichi no Murakami Kō" (Japanese: 鈴鳴第一の村上鋼)	Ken Koyama	Natsuko Takahashi	Yasuhiro Namatame, Nobuhiro Masuda & Megumi Yamashita	August 16, 2015
43	43	"Nasu Squad's Choice"; Transliteration: "Nasu-tai no Sentaku" (Japanese: 那須隊の選択)	Directed by : Shigeru Ueda; Storyboarded by : Takeshi Mori	Yuuichi Nomura	Masahiro Naoi	August 23, 2015
44	44	"Battle in the Foul Weather"; Transliteration: "Akutenkō no Sentō" (Japanese: 悪天候の戦闘)	Kazuya Karasawa	Masahiro Yokotani	Eisaku Inoue	August 30, 2015
45	45	"The Thing That Decides the Battle"; Transliteration: "Shōbu o Kimeru Mono" (Japanese: 勝負を決めるもの)	Akihiro Nakamura	Yuuichi Nomura	Yōichi Ōnishi	September 6, 2015
46	46	"The Ace's Willpower"; Transliteration: "Ēsu no Iji" (Japanese: エースの意地)	Mitsuru Hongo	Natsuko Takahashi	Noboru Koizumi	September 20, 2015
47	47	"The Captain's Pride"; Transliteration: "Taichō no Puraido" (Japanese: 隊長のプライド)	Directed by : Takuma Suzuki; Storyboarded by : Takeshi Mori	Masahiro Yokotani	Kiichi Takaoka	September 27, 2015
48	48	"And Towards Tomorrow"; Transliteration: "Soshite Ashita e" (Japanese: そして明日へ)	Yoshiki Kawasaki	Yuuichi Nomura	Setsuko Nobuzane & Nobuhiro Masuda	October 4, 2015
49	49	"Fugitives from Another World"; Transliteration: "Isekai kara no Tōbōsha" (Japanese: 異世界からの逃亡者)	Kouji Ogawa	Hiroyuki Yoshino	Yūji Hakamada	October 11, 2015
50	50	"Invisible Assailants"; Transliteration: "Sugata Naki Shūgeki-sha" (Japanese: 姿なき襲撃者)	Directed by : Mana Uchiyama; Storyboarded by : Takeshi Mori	Masahiro Yokotani	Masahiro Naoi	October 18, 2015
51	51	"Xeno's Trion Soldiers"; Transliteration: "Zeno no Torion Hei" (Japanese: ゼノのトリオン兵)	Ken Koyama	Natsuko Takahashi	Yasuhiro Namatame	October 25, 2015
52	52	"The Sunset of Meeden"; Transliteration: "Mīden no Yūhi" (Japanese: 玄界(ミデン)の夕陽)	Kazuya Karasawa	Yuuichi Nomura	Eisaku Inoue	November 1, 2015
53	53	"The One that Shall Be Saved"; Transliteration: "Mamorubeki-mono" (Japanese: 守るべきもの)	Directed by : Shigeru Ueda; Storyboarded by : Takashi Sokabe	Hiroyuki Yoshino	Yōichi Ōnishi	November 8, 2015
54	54	"Giev's Thrust"; Transliteration: "Gīvu no Kōsei" (Japanese: ギーヴの攻勢)	Akihiro Nakamura	Hiroshi Ōnogi	Noboru Koizumi	November 15, 2015
55	55	"Dead or Alive"; Transliteration: "Deddo・oa・Araibu" (Japanese: デッド・オア・アライブ)	Directed by : Takuma Suzuki; Storyboarded by : Yasuhiro Geshi	Hiroshi Ōnogi	Shigenori Taniguchi & Shinichiro Minami	November 22, 2015
56	56	"Mystery of Lilith"; Transliteration: "Ririsu no Nazo" (Japanese: リリスの謎)	Kenichi Takeshita	Toshimitsu Takeuchi	Setsuko Nobuzane & Nobuhiro Masuda	November 29, 2015
57	57	"Xeno and Lilith"; Transliteration: "Zeno to Ririsu" (Japanese: ゼノとリリス)	Directed by : Mana Uchiyama; Storyboarded by : Takeshi Mori	Masahiro Yokotani	Masahiro Naoi	December 6, 2015
58	58	"Captured Osamu"; Transliteration: "Toraware no Osamu" (Japanese: 囚われの修)	Directed by : Shigeru Ueda; Storyboarded by : Isao Torada	Yuuichi Nomura	Yūji Hakamada	December 13, 2015
59	59	"Two Black Triggers"; Transliteration: "Futatsu no Burakku Torigā" (Japanese: 二つのブラックトリガー)	Yoshiki Kawasaki	Hiroyuki Yoshino	Toshihisa Kaiya & Hiroko Kasuga	December 20, 2015
60	60	"Yōtarō's Adventure"; Transliteration: "Yōtarō no Bōken" (Japanese: 陽太郎の冒険)	Ken Koyama	Hiroshi Ōnogi	Yasuhiro Namatame	December 27, 2015
61	61	"Truth and Lies"; Transliteration: "Shinjitsu to Uso" (Japanese: 真実と嘘)	Kazuya Karasawa	Toshimitsu Takeuchi	Yōichi Ōnishi	January 10, 2016
62	62	"Giev and Charon"; Transliteration: "Gīvu to Karon" (Japanese: ギーヴとカロン)	Directed by : Akihiro Nakamura; Storyboarded by : Gō Koga	Masahiro Yokotani	Eisaku Inoue	January 17, 2016
63	63	"A Reversed Future"; Transliteration: "Hanten Suru Mirai" (Japanese: 反転する未来)	Kouji Ogawa	Yuuichi Nomura	Noboru Koizumi	January 24, 2016
64	64	"The Prisoner from Aftokrator"; Transliteration: "Afutokuratoru no Horyo" (Japanese: アフトクラトルの捕虜)	Directed by : Takuma Suzuki; Storyboarded by : Yasuhiro Geshi	Hiroyuki Yoshino	Shigenori Taniguchi & Shinichiro Minami	January 31, 2016
65	65	"No. 1 Shooter, Masataka Ninomiya"; Transliteration: "Nanbā Wan Shūtā Ninomiya Masataka" (Japanese: No.1シューター二宮匡貴)	Directed by : Mana Uchiyama; Storyboarded by : Takashi Sokabe	Hiroshi Ōnogi	Masahiro Naoi	February 7, 2016
66	66	"Sharpened Fangs"; Transliteration: "Togisumasa Reta Kiba" (Japanese: 研ぎ澄まされた牙)	Kenichi Takeshita	Toshimitsu Takeuchi	Setsuko Nobuzane & Yuka Takemori	February 14, 2016
67	67	"The Battle of the Top B-Rank Teams"; Transliteration: "Bī-kyū Jōi-sen" (Japanese: B級上位戦)	Jiro Makino	Masahiro Yokotani	Yūji Hakamada	February 21, 2016
68	68	"The Targeted Tamakoma"; Transliteration: "Nerawareru Tamakoma" (Japanese: 狙われる玉狛)	Yoshiki Kawasaki	Hiroshi Ōnogi	Toshihisa Kaiya & Kiichi Takaoka	February 28, 2016
69	69	"Battle Royal"; Transliteration: "Batoru Roiyaru" (Japanese: バトルロイヤル)	Kazuya Karasawa	Yuuichi Nomura	Yōichi Ōnishi	March 6, 2016
70	70	"A Captain's Duty"; Transliteration: "Taichō no Tsutome" (Japanese: 隊長の務め)	Ken Koyama	Toshimitsu Takeuchi	Yasuhiro Namatame	March 13, 2016
71	71	"A New Threat"; Transliteration: "Aratanaru Kyōi" (Japanese: 新たなる脅威)	Directed by : Shigeru Ueda; Storyboarded by : Takashi Sokabe	Hiroshi Ōnogi	Masahiro Naoi	March 20, 2016
72	72	"An Evolving Mikumo Squad"; Transliteration: "Shinka Suru Mikumo-tai" (Japanese: 進化する三雲隊)	Directed by : Takuma Suzuki; Storyboarded by : Yasuhiro Geshi	Yuuichi Nomura	Shigenori Taniguchi & Shinichiro Minami	March 27, 2016
73	73	"To the Future"; Transliteration: "Mirai e" (Japanese: 未来へ)	Kouji Ogawa	Hiroyuki Yoshino	Noboru Koizumi	April 3, 2016
