= Okojo-san =

Japanese manga series

- Promotional image for Okojo-san, featuring characters Haruka and Okojo

オコジョさん
- Genre: Comedy
- Manga
- Written by: Ayumi Uno
- Published by: Hakusensha
- Magazine: LaLa
- Original run: 1996 – 2005
- Volumes: 8
- Anime television series

Okojo's Happy Apartment
- Directed by: Yusuke Yamamoto
- Produced by: Tomoko Gushima, Hidenori Itahashi, Tomoki Ueda
- Written by: Satoru Nishizono
- Music by: Masamichi Amano
- Studio: Radix Ace Entertainment
- Original network: TV Tokyo
- Original run: October 2, 2001 – September 24, 2002
- Episodes: 51
- icon

Okojo-san (オコジョさん) is a Japanese manga series written and illustrated by Ayumi Uno and serialized in LaLa. The chapters were collected into eight tankōbon volumes by Hakusensha and released from 1996 to 2005. The series is about an ermine living as a pet in a small apartment complex.

Okojo-san was adapted into a 51-episode anime series titled Okojo's Happy Apartment (しあわせソウのオコジョさん, Shiawase Sou no Okojo-san) by the Japanese animation studio Radix Ace Entertainment, and aired on TV Tokyo from October 2, 2001, to September 24, 2002.

== Synopsis ==
A white ermine, Okojo-san lives at an exotic pet store run by a greedy manager until one day he escapes. In the chaos following, he ends up unconscious in a garbage can, where college student Haruka Tsuchiya finds him. Mistaking him for a ferret, Tsuchiya takes Okojo home with him. At the Shiawase apartment complex, Okojo meets other pets, including the gerbil Chorori, and the various eccentric human tenants. With his friends, Okojo struggles to adapt to life with humans, vacuum cleaners, and all the other things that come with human society. The comedy is largely reliant on absurdity and Okojo's tendency towards melodrama.

== Characters ==
=== Animals ===
- Okojo / Kojopii (Okojo-san, オコジョさん) - A white ermine with a leaf on top of his head, Okojo-san is very confident, aggressive, and proud, viewing all humans as either servants or rivals. In spite of his professed disdain for them, Okojo finds himself becoming very attached to his extended family of humans and animals. He takes himself very seriously, and as such has a quick temper and is prone to melodrama. When Okojo must be taken to the local veterinarian, Yuuta gives Okojo the name "Kojopii," but the other animals continue to call him "Okojo-san." Saeki Shun, who initially thought Okojo was a mouse, calls him "Chuuchun."
- Chorori (ちょろり) - A pet Mongolian gerbil who lives in Shiawase Apartments, Chorori is very timid and polite, and sees Okojo-san as his superior. His owner, an unpopular manga artist, is very cruel to Chorori at times, but Chorori loves her nonetheless.
- Kojoru (コジョルー) - A female ermine
- Tatchin (タッチン) - A male ferret
- Pyonki and Pyanki (ピョンキー and ピャンキー) - Two hedgehogs

=== Humans ===
- Haruka Tsuchiya (Tsuchiya Haruka) - A college student living in the Siawase apartment finds Okojo in a garbage can and cares for it. He also knows the neighbors pretty well, like Yuuta, an elementary student who lives next door and visits okojo. He apparently doesn't speak that much and only says a couple of words per episode. He attends Sumidagawa University with Saeki.
- Yuuta Kudou - Yuuta is an elementary student and is one of the neighbors of Haruka. He visits Haruka. Haruka planned to give Yuuta Okojo but decided to keep him when Yuuta told him his mother didn't allow him to have pets. Yuuta loves to play with Okojo.
- Mayumi - Mayumi is a shy student that has a crush on Haruka Tsuchiya. She dreams about him but is too shy to ask him out. Her best friend is Izumi, who wants to help her to win Haruka's heart.
- Doctor Akihi Tsukahara - A sensitive veterinarian at a pet clinic with his nurse, Miyako. He fell in love with Okojo and he bought his own okojo-plushie. He loves to visit Kojopii every time he can.
- Miyako - Nurse of Doctor Tsukahara. She does all that she can to help him, although she is annoyed when he ignores her in favor of dreaming about meeting Okojo.
- Manga Artist - The owner of Chorori, she is a manga artist. She does very cruel and unusual torture to Chorori. An example would be when she was about to feed Chorori to the crawfish but then Okojo bit her and fights her. She fears a call from her publisher. She's much nicer when the publisher accepts her manga.
- Ruru and Ruka Tadakoro - Two twin pre-schoolers who love to creep out other living things. For example, when Okojo and Chorori stumble into their room they start playing a game called "The Strange Game" where they would sing strange in perfect harmony. This creeped out Chorori and intimidated Okojo.
- Shun Saeki - A college student who lives in the apartment building. He shares an apartment with his younger sister Tomoko. He's always seen with his eyes closed and smiling, even when he's hurt. He frightens Okojo and Chorori because he talks to himself, plays cruelly with Okojo, and never seems to get angry at Okojo for scratching him. He plays with Okojo by calling him an eel, using Okojo as a scarf, and he mind-tricks Okojo to imitate him when he says the word "Chuuchun". He attends Sumidagawa University with Haruka. He lives with his sister, Tomoko. Saeki wanted Okojo to be his pet, but when he lost to Haruka, he decided to buy his own pet - a ferret named Tatchin.
- Tomoko Saeki (佐伯トモコ) - Has the same personality as her brother. She played with Okojo using him as a scarf. She is jolly and everything makes her laugh.

== Voice cast ==
- Okojo-san - Miyuki Sawashiro
- Haruka Tsuchiya - Yutaka Koizumi
- Yuuta Kudou - Nanae Katō
- Chorori - Vanilla Yamazaki
- Akihi Tsukahara - Hiroki Takahashi
- Shun Saeki - Hideaki Harada
- Tomoko Saeki - Asuka Nakamura
- Mayumi Morishita - Sumi Mutoh
- Narrator - Haruhi Nanao

== Episodes ==
Episodes
1# Okojo-san has arrived!/ Okojo-san goes to the hospital (オコジョさんが来た!/オコジョさん、病院へ行く)
2# Kojopy's Siawase Apartment Exploration/ Saeki laughs. (コジョピーのしあわせ荘探検/笑うサエキ)
3# Okojo's grave/The enemy is a cleaning machine (オコジョの墓/敵は掃除機)
4# Kojopii goes to paradise/Kojopii's campus life (コジョピー、パラダイスへ/コジョピーのキャンパス生活)
5# Kojopii's secret/Kojopii vs Tatchin (コジョピーの秘密/コジョピーVSタッチン)
6# Tatchin's tears/Kojopii's nightmare (タッチンの涙/コジョピーの悪夢)
7# Kojopii's makeover!/Kojopii in love (コジョピー大変身!/恋するコジョピー)
8# The fantastic hiking/Cosmos-hata's Tsukahara (すてきなハイキング/コスモス畑のツカハラ)
9# Life with Kojopii/There is paradise in Kotatsu (コジョピーのいる生活/コタツの中はパラダイス)
10# Yuki, Yuuta and Karaage/Leader Okojo! Appearance Chapter (雪とゆうたとカラアゲと/オコジョ番長!登場編)
11# Choruri and Nezumi-dono/I like Kojopii (ちょろりとネズミどの/好きすきコジョピー)

== Songs ==
=== Opening themes ===
- Ano ko no Happy Face (A Child's Happy Face) - Shiawase Sisters (eps 1-25)
- Kojopii no Uta (Kojopii's Song) - Shiawase Okojo-gumi (eps 26–51)

=== End themes ===
- Nemuku Naru Made - Hideaki Takatori (eps 1-25)
- Poka Poka Kojoru - Mika Sakenobe (eps 26–51)
