= Somali and the Forest Spirit =

Japanese manga and anime series

- Cover of Somali and the Forest Spirit volume 1 by Tokuma Shoten

ソマリと森の神様 (Somari to Mori no Kamisama)
- Genre: Fantasy
- Manga
- Written by: Yako Gureishi
- Published by: Tokuma Shoten
- English publisher: NA: Titan Comics
- Imprint: Zenon Comics
- Magazine: Web Comic Zenyon
- Original run: April 2015 – October 2019
- Volumes: 6
- Anime television series
- Directed by: Kenji Yasuda
- Produced by: Manami Kabashima; Takuma Sugi; Sachiko Inamoto; Keiichi Oomura; Masako Iwamoto; Liu Junwen
- Written by: Mariko Mochizuki
- Music by: Ryou Yoshimata
- Studio: Satelight; Hornets (1–2, 4–12)
- Licensed by: Crunchyroll (streaming); NA: Sentai Filmworks (home video)
- Original network: Tokyo MX, BS NTV
- Original run: January 9, 2020 – March 26, 2020
- Episodes: 12
- icon

Somali and the Forest Spirit (Japanese: ソマリと森の神様, Hepburn: Somari to Mori no Kamisama) is a Japanese fantasy manga series by Yako Gureishi. It was serialized online from April 2015 to October 2019 via Tokuma Shoten's online manga magazine Web Comic Zenyon. It was collected in six tankōbon volumes. An anime television series adaptation produced by Satelight and Hornets ran from January 9 to March 26, 2020. Crunchyroll co-produced and streamed the series.

After a long hiatus, the manga officially ended on December 22, 2020, due to the author Yako Gureishi's health problems.

== Plot ==
The world is ruled by spirits, goblins, and all manner of strange creatures. Human beings are persecuted, to the very point of extinction. One day, a golem and a lone human girl meet. This is a record of the pair, one a member of a ruined race, the other a watchman of the forest. It tells of their travels together and of the bond between father and daughter, but the golem can only live for another year or so, he must find other humans in order to get her with her own race before he dies.

== Characters ==
Somali (ソマリ)
Voiced by: Inori Minase (Japanese); Corina Boettger (English)
A young human girl who is found by Golem in his forest. She has endless curiosity, which usually gets her in trouble. She wears a hood on her head with minotaur horns to hide her human features since humans are a delicacy in the monster world.
Golem (ゴーレム)
Voiced by: Daisuke Ono (Japanese); Kyle Hebert (English)
An ancient automaton protector of the forest who stumbles upon Somali while patrolling the woods. He exhibits no emotions, but instinctively protects Somali from any potential threat. He acts like Somali's father and she calls him "Dad".
Shizuno (シズノ)
Voiced by: Hiroki Nanami (Japanese); Lucien Dodge (English)
A dwarf oni and an herbalist. He uses herbs to create medicine and lives in a cabin in the woods. He took care of Somali when she injured her knee while playing.
Yabashira (ヤバシラ)
Voiced by: Tatsuhisa Suzuki (Japanese); Kyle McCarley (English)
Shizuno's assistant who lives with Shizuno in the forest cabin. He is also an oni and the caretaker of Shizuno's abode.
Kikila (キキーラ, Kikīra)
Voiced by: Yū Kobayashi (Japanese); Alex Cazares (English)
A young woolly shurigara boy. He is reluctant to work at his father's diner when his mother gets injured. He befriends Somali, though is wary of her love of cuddling furry animals.
Kokilila (コキリラ, Kokirira)
Voiced by: Tomokazu Seki
A woolly shurigara and Kikila's father. He owns a slightly rundown diner in Anthole City and hires Golem as a waiter when his wife Giina injures her back while working.
Muthrica (ムスリカ, Musurika)
Voiced by: Show Hayami
The guardian of Anthole City's sacred cavern and Kikila's teacher. He saves both Somali and Kikila from a beast when they go delving into the underground area without permission.
Uzoi (ウゾイ)
Voiced by: Saori Hayami (Japanese); Cristina Vee (English)
A harpy and Haitora's travel companion. She loves Haitora and is willing to do anything to cure his condition, going so far as to kill another human to do it.
Haitora (ハイトラ)
Voiced by: Yūki Ono
A human disguised as a falcohol and Uzoi's travel companion. Ailing with a medical condition that's painfully turning him into a harpy after he and his family's ate Uzoi's mother,, he attempts to stop Uzoi from hurting others for his benefit.
Hazel (ヘイゼル, Heizeru)
Voiced by: Ai Kayano
A witch who works at the Witches' Crest Library and Praline's younger sister. She aids Golem and Somali as they research the whereabouts and knowledge of humans.
Praline (プラリネ, Purarine)
Voiced by: Ayahi Takagaki (Japanese); Colleen O'Shaughnessey (English)
A witch at the Witches' Crest Library and Hazel's older sister, she lives in an underground bunker beneath the library and occasionally steals books to read for herself.
Rosa-obasan (ローザおばさん)
Voiced by: Rie Shibata
The multi-armed lizard-like innkeeper of the inn used by the group in Bygone City. While she is initially helpful and sweet, when she finds out Somali is human, she betrays the group and gossips about it to others.

== Media ==
=== Manga ===
No.	Original release date	Original ISBN	English release date	English ISBN
1	November 20, 2015	978-4-19-980313-0	December 17, 2024	978-1-78774-362-5
2	June 20, 2016	978-4-19-980351-2	April 1, 2025	978-1-78774-363-2
3	March 18, 2017	978-4-19-980400-7	August 19, 2025	978-1-78774-364-9
4	December 20, 2017	978-4-19-980465-6	December 23, 2025	978-1-78774-365-6
5	August 20, 2018	978-4-19-980510-3	June 9, 2026	978-1-78774-366-3
6	April 20, 2019	978-4-19-980560-8	—	—

=== Anime ===
An anime television series adaptation was announced on March 22, 2019. The series was originally scheduled to premiere in October 2019, but the premiere date was pushed back to January 2020. The series was co-animated by Satelight and Hornets, with Kenji Yasuda directing the series and Ikuko Itoh designing the characters. Mariko Mochizuki handled the series composition, while Ryo Yoshimata composed the series' music. It aired from January 9 to March 26, 2020, on AbemaTV, Tokyo MX, and BS-NTV and ran for 12 episodes. Naotarō Moriyama performed the series' opening theme song "Arigatō wa Kocchi no Kotoba," while Inori Minase performed the series' ending theme song "Kokoro Somali." Crunchyroll debuted the first episode on January 2, 2020, a week before its Japan airing. On May 18, 2021, it was announced that Sentai Filmworks picked up the home video rights.

No.	Title (Note: All English titles are taken from Crunchyroll.)	Original release date
1	"Journeying Parent and Child"; Transliteration: "Tabisuru Oyako" (Japanese: 旅する親子)	January 9, 2020 (Note: Crunchyroll advance premiered this episode on January 2, 2020 prior to its airing on Japanese television.)
Golem, an ancient wandering forest protector, finds a young human girl named Somali bounded in chains while making his rounds through the woods. He takes her under his care and allows himself to be called her father. The pair travel from city to city, learning the history of their civilization. They find out a war between monsters and humanity caused the near extinction of the human race, and while some of the survivors escaped to seclude themselves from society, many others ended up as either slaves or food. While shopping in a town, Somali ends up wandering away from Golem and chases a cat, eventually getting cornered in an alley. The cat, who reveals himself to be a monster, nearly figures out Somali is human based on her smell, but is shoo'd away by Golem. The pair leave for their next destination and Golem scolds Somali for wandering off, but realizes small children act on pure curiosity. He offers her his hand to hold to ensure she remains close to him.
2	"Edible Herbs and the Oni's Dwelling"; Transliteration: "Kusabira to Oni no Sumika" (Japanese: くさびらと鬼の住処)	January 16, 2020
While eating breakfast beside a flowing creek, Somali trips and falls while chasing some horned rabbits (aka Jackalopes), injuring her knee in the process. Suddenly, a dwarf oni named Shizuno appears and offers to help bandage Somali's injury and brings the pair to his home. There, they meet Yabashira, another oni and Shizuno's assistant. After feeding Somali, Golem asks Shizuno to teach him the ways of medical herbology, to which Shizuno accepts in exchange for a small piece Golem's armor to study to further his medical research. While Shizuno teaches Golem different medical combinations, Somali has Yabashira give her chores to make up for Golem giving up a piece of himself for her benefit. When Shizuno begins to regret asking for a shard of Golem, he reassures the dwarf oni that his anguish is similar to Somali's when she hurt herself, which he never wants to witness ever again. That night, as Somali sleeps, Golem reveals to the onis that he is travelling with Somali to find her parents, but he only has a little over a year left until he shuts down permanently. The next morning, the pair thank their oni hosts and take their leave back into the forest.
3	"The Sea at the Bottom of the Cave"; Transliteration: "Horaana no Soko no Umi" (Japanese: ほら穴の底の海)	January 23, 2020
After days of walking and their supplies starting to run low, Somali and Golem arrive in the desert canyon village of Anthole City. However, their remaining wares don't sell for enough money to restock their supplies, so Golem decides to take up a waitering job at a diner to earn some extra cash. The diner, run by a family of deer-like shurigaras, appears to be nearly abandoned due to the lack of patrons, so Golem fills in for the family's injured mother while Somali befriends their young child named Kikila. During his shift, Golem hears of humans residing on the far side of the neighboring desert, but is still unable to buy the necessary equipment. With his continuous work schedule, Golem spends less and less time with Somali, causing her to feel lonely. Though initially hesitant, Golem allows Somali to run an errand with Kikila across town. Together, Somali and Kikila talk about her journey with Golem, but she's scared that as soon as it's over, Golem will leave her. To appease her worry, Kikila takes Somali to a sacred cave beneath the town to grant a wish. The duo wander around the mysterious cavern and find the field of glowing flowers to grant their wish, but awaken a mushroom-like monster in the process. As it goes in for the attack, the monster is chased off by a scruffy wolf-like beast who turns his attention toward Somali.
4	"The Wishing Flower and the Promise Request"; Transliteration: "Kanaeru Hana to Negau Yakusoku" (Japanese: 叶える花と願う約束)	January 30, 2020
The wolf-man, named Muthrica, reveals himself to be the guardian of the underground chamber and Kikila's teacher. When they observe Somali's flower, it quickly begins to lose its glow and die due to not receiving enough nutrients from the mystical tsuchiami trees. After convincing Muthrica, the trio explore deeper into the grotto to find a flower to grant Somali's wish. They arrive at the core of the cavern and discover the giant tsuchiami tree surrounded by many flowers. As Somali picks one, they are interrupted by a massive lizard monster who blesses Somali's wish and her strong spirit. The trio make it back to the diner late, but Golem scolds Somali for straying off from the errands, causing her to run to her room. After explaining their ordeal, Muthrica encourages Golem to hear out Somali's side of the story, but before he has a chance to, Somali suddenly becomes feverishly sick and refuses to eat. Golem rushes out and buys medicine, realizing the trauma Somali is feeling may in part be his fault due to neglecting her. As Solami rests, Kokilila, Kikila's father, advises Golem that parenting has its troubles and that it's always a learning process. The next morning, Golem and Somali make up and promise to stay together forever, but Golem has to keep working since he paid his earnings on Somali's medicine. As he opens the diner, Golem is approached by Muthrica, who indicates he knows the truth about the automaton's dwindling lifespan and that his promise to stay with Somali won't be kept.
5	"The Wandering Birds"; Transliteration: "Yurai no Tori" (Japanese: 揺蕩いの鳥)	February 6, 2020
A few days later, Somali and Golem depart into the desert toward their next destination and arrive in Winecup Village. There, they meet Uzoi, a harpy, and Haitora, an ailing falcohol, who are also a pair of travelers. Upon hearing their reason for traveling, the feathered duo offer to travel with Golem and Somali, who graciously accept. Unbeknownst to them, however, Uzoi figures out Somali is human, and Haitora is also revealed to be a disguised human who is slowly and violently morphing into a harpy. Looking for a way to cure Haitora's condition, Uzoi schemes to use Somali in some way. The group begins their trek through the desert, stumbling into sandstorms and desert beasts, until they arrive at a luminescent cave to spend the night. When Somali and Uzoi go in search of water, Haitora reveals to Golem that he is human and that they must stop Uzoi, who suddenly pins down Somali and claims that her blood will save Haitora.
6	"Dying Flowers Look Up at the Birds"; Transliteration: "Ikinone Haru Hana wa Tori wo Aogu" (Japanese: 息の根はる花は鳥を仰ぐ)	February 13, 2020
As they search for Somali, Haitora tells Golem that he and Uzoi were informed my a strange soothsayer that his tainted blood would be cured by finding "new, clean blood", so Uzoi intends to take Somali's. Elsewhere, Somali manages to escape from Uzoi's grasp, but falls into an underground pond, forcing Uzoi to save her and subsequently apologize and reveal the reason for her actions. Golem and Haitora arrive and Somali forgives Uzoi since she saved her from drowning. That night as Uzoi and Somali sleep, Haitora reveals to Golem that he had a family in a small farm town, but it was attacked by monsters during the war. Running out of food during their escape, he encountered a harpy, which turned out to be Uzoi's mother, and instantly killed her and brought her to his family hideout to eat. Doing so violently turned his family into harpies and killed them, though he was spared and left slightly deformed. Later on, a young Uzoi approached him and became attached to him. In the present, Uzio is revealed to be awake and heard Haitora's story. The next day, while continuing their desert voyage, Uzoi and Somali are swept away during a massive sand twister. The pair are soon located, but are being chased by a monster. Haitora leads it away, intending to give his life for Uzoi's as payment for his past, but is saved by her instead. She then forgives him for living a lie and tells him to live for her sake.
7	"The Footsteps That Stalk the Witches"; Transliteration: "Majo Ni Sugaru Ashidori" (Japanese: 魔女に縋る足取り)	February 20, 2020
Golem begins to feel guilty regarding his soon-to-be broken promise to stay with Somali after seeing Haitora promise to live with Uzoi. He reveals to Haitora about his upcoming demise, and hears about a village west of the desert where any sort of information can be found. The next day, the group reaches the end of the desert, so Haitora and Uzoi split off on their journey while Golem and Somali head for the rumored village. After some adventurous traveling, they arrive at a magical village run by friendly witches. They find the library to conduct their research on humans, and with the aid of sister witches Hazel and Praline, find a book regarding humans called The Chronicles of Haraiso, though Somali is suddenly attacked by book-eating monsters called Pescafish. After dealing with them, a massive Pescafish appears and targets the Chronicles. She tries to escape with it, but the attempt is in vain as it is destroyed by the monster, who subsequently turns its attention to Somali herself. Golem intervenes and stops the beast, but loses much of his armored shell. Somali tearfully apologizes for Golem being injured and for losing the book, but he reassures her that her safety is priority. The witches check to see if someone had previously read the Chronicles, discovering that the sole person who did was Isolde Nebsolv, the head librarian of the library over 300 years prior.
8	"Meetings and Bonds Prayed For"; Transliteration: "Inori Kataru Deai to Kizuna" (Japanese: 祈り語る出会いと絆)	February 27, 2020
After considering the failing health of the head librarian, Praline decides to give Golem a map of the library to find their way. However, they are caught by security monsters and branded as intruders. Golem grabs Somali and they manage to escape, arriving in the heart of the library where the aging head librarian resides. Isolde reveals that she wrote The Chronicles of Haraiso due to her ancestor's experiences with humans as a young girl. She explains that as a child, Feodora Nebsolv crash landed due to a storm in a village of humans who were governed by a golem called Haraiso. Feodora quickly grew accustomed to the culture of the village, but her feelings instantly changed when the villagers mob together to kill a peaceful neighboring monster. She is forced to reveal her inhuman nature to save a villager, and is consequently branded as a "Grotesque", the human term for monster, forcing her to leave. Isolde finishes the story and tells of humans residing "at the end of the world". She also reveals that she knows Somali is human, but is proud to have met one who loves their world before she suddenly passes away.
9	"Memories of Minor Days"; Transliteration: "Chīsana Hibi no Omoide" (Japanese: 小さな日々の思い出)	March 5, 2020
En route to their next destination, Golem and Somali take shelter from rain in a large treehouse. The abode is seasonally vacant, but still houses cooking ingredients, so Somali asks Golem to make something for her. After sifting through recipes, Golem makes a souffle which Somali finds delicious. Before she can finish it, or warn Golem of a sudden loose tooth, Shizuno and Yabashira suddenly appear at their door asking for shelter. The next day, the two onis join the group and travel to snowy Bygone City, a savage town, in search of a famous dentist. They find the dentist, a mouse-looking man named Sowak, and he tells Shizuno about the ways of dentistry, but Somali becomes fearful due to her new dental problem. She flees into a trio of ruffians, causing an alley brawl between them and Golem with the two onis. During the scuffle, Solami's tooth comes free, but upon their return to the dentist, he informs her that it was a baby tooth and would be replaced. In need of a place to stay, the group is approached by an innkeeper who offers his place as thanks for getting rid of the gang from before, and also in exchange for being the town bodyguards. As Somali sleeps in her new bed, Shizuno confirms with Golem that Somali is human, and finds out that the automaton traded his forest guardianship to protect her instead.
10	"The Infant Child and the Green Boulder"; Transliteration: "Osanago to Midori no Toride" (Japanese: 幼子と緑の砦)	March 12, 2020
Golem recalls to Shizuno how he met Somali in his forest. While on patrol, he passed by a toppled cart full of dead humans that had been attacked. A forest animal led him away from the wreckage to where he discovered a girl bound in chains beneath a tree, where she suddenly called him "dad". Against his will, the girl began follow him, day and night, rain or shine. Over time, Golem began to grow attached to her, even saving her from drowning when she jumped into a pond to retrieve his recently lost armored shell. Golem decided to leave the forest with the girl to find humans, and subsequently names her "Somali" based on the animal that initially led him to her. In the present, Golem finishes his story and reveals to Shizuno his crippling physical body due to his end nearing. The next day, the group is tasked to bodyguard the town, so Golem and Yabashira head out to work while Shizuno cares for Somali. Over the next few days, Somali thinks of a present to give to Golem while he works, eventually deciding to knit something. One day, an innkeeper named Rosa arrives with food and supplies for the group, and helps Somali with her present. She teaches Somali to make a knitted bracelet for Golem, and hugs the young girl with joy when she starts to get the hang of it. However, that night in town, Rosa encounters the trio gang from before and informs them that she figured out Somali is human.
11	"Those Who Protect and Those Who Threaten"; Transliteration: "Mamoru Mono to Kiba Muku Mono" (Japanese: 護る者と牙剥く者)	March 19, 2020
As they wrap up their daily duties for the final time, Golem and Yabashira shop for supplies for their trip while Somali finishes her bracelet. That night, Somali presents Golem with her gift, and is happily surprised when he gifts her a similar bracelet he found in town. They all play in the snow before suddenly Golem sees a hunting party in the distance in search for humans. Yabashira finally learns of Somali's humanity and agrees to distract the party while Golem, Shizuno, and the girl flee into a nearby mine. They find their path blocked by a broken bridge when they are approached by another hunting party, forcing Golem to carry the other two and jump down into the cavern below. They make their way toward the exit when Rosa appears and, under the guise of helping them escape, suddenly locks them in a cage. Rosa tells them how her childhood village was persecuted by a nearby human settlement, forcing her to take revenge on all humans. The hunters approach for the kill, but as Golem attempts to fight, he instantly collapses in a heap and loses an arm, having used up too much life energy. As Somali is taken, Golem suddenly transforms into a monstrous hulking beast, startling everyone.
12	"Bonded Father and Child"; Transliteration: "Kokoro Tsunagiau Oyako" (Japanese: 心繋ぎ合う親子)	March 26, 2020
Golem targets the hunting party and attacks them, prompting them to run away in fear. As Golem chases them down, Somali blocks Golem's path of destruction, causing him to come to his senses and shut down. He awakens a few days later in a forest meadow and apologizes to everyone for his actions, adding that his injuries to himself will not heal like the other's will. That night, he and Shizuno go for a walk where he tells the oni that his physical capabilities are crippled and his allotted time may be shortened, though the oni still believes something can be done to help. The next day, the group arrives in a town celebrating an annual festival. While the others watch a carnival show, Golem sneaks away, feeling that his time to depart has come. When Somali realizes this, she sprints off to find him, locating him in a nearby forest. As she approaches, Golem reveals to her that she is better off without him, using his recent explosion of rage as an example of why he should be alone. Somali pleas with him to stay, eventually causing the automaton to realize he truly has emotions. With a renewed promise and bond, the father and daughter proclaim their promise to stay together forever.
