= Dogtato =

Japanese anime television series

- Jagainu-kun

じゃがいぬくん (Dogtato-kun)
- Anime television series
- Directed by: Yutaka Kagawa
- Studio: Studio Egg
- Original network: Mainichi Broadcasting and TBS
- Original run: 4 April 2004 – 18 July 2004
- Episodes: 25

Dogtato-kun (じゃがいぬくん, Jagainu-kun) is a popular anime in Japan. Dogtato is one of the half-animal, half-vegetable inhabitants of "Veggie-town". There are 25 episodes of Dogtato, as well as one promotional episode. The word Jagainu-kun comes from the Japanese word for potato (jagaimo) and dog (inu).

== Characters ==
Dogtato-kun is the main character, friendly and helpful to all the other characters. When happy, his tail sprouts a flower.

Hedgetato-chan is Dogtato-kun's girlfriend. She is a pink hedgehog/sweet potato who sprouts many flowers when she is happy.

Eggplooch-kun is a purple dog/eggplant with shiny skin which squeaks when rubbed. Eggplooch travels by spinning rapidly.

Croconion-kun is a long, thin crocodile/spring onion with a maniacal laugh who tends to pop up in odd places, such as underneath Dogtato (episode 2), or is often seen standing upright on a hilltop, talking to no one in particular. His shadow appears to have a mind of its own, and an equally maniacal laugh.

Boartato-kun is a round, dark brown wild boar/potato with an unfortunate habit of always moving at full speed, not stopping till he hits something or gets stuck. Because of this, he often leaves a trail of destruction throughout Veggie-town.

Lettuphant-chan is a round, green elephant/lettuce with a high opinion of herself and a crush on Dogtato. She invariably rejects the advances of Cabbopotamus, who is very fond of her.

Cabbopotamus-kun is a large hippopotamus/cabbage who has huge crush on Lettuphant, who runs away from him, considering him too huge and unrefined for her.

Cherrodent-kun is a small pink mouse/cherry, who loves to hang out (literally) with his twin sister, also named Cherrodent. His sister gets extremely upset when he gets lost in episode 4.

Peachmingo-chan is flamingo/peach who considers herself highly beauteous, and loves beautiful things (such as Lotus Eater's tail flower), but abhors dirt, hence is unable to speak to Lotus Eater.

Beanbirds are an innumerably large group of baby bird/beans who are usually seen walking in a line, accompanied by Cucumbird. They appear to have the magical ability to make others happy.

Cucumbird-san is a stork-like bird/cucumber who acts as a caretaker to the Beanbirds, picking up the ones that fall and supervising them on their walks.

Black Beanbirds appear in episode 12, as an evil counterpart to the real Beanbirds, spreading gloom wherever they go.

Caterpillar is a tiny green caterpillar who resides in Veggie-town despite not being a vegetable. He is the first character to be seen in the series, and appears from time to time.

== Plot ==
There is no fixed plot running through the series, as most episodes are isolated, except for episodes 07–08 and 20–21, which are linked. In one episode, they venture around, and soon, they find themselves in "Straight" land, and in another, they chase after a falling star, demonstrating Dogtato's playful style of storytelling.

== Video game ==
In 2000, Japanese game developer Pack-In-Video developed a video game based on the original manga series for the Game Boy Color. The game features musical compositions by George Tokoro.
