= Princess Tutu =

Japanese anime television series

- Key visual for the series

プリンセスチュチュ (Purinsesu Chuchu)
- Genre: Magical girl
- Created by: Ikuko Itoh
- Anime television series
- Directed by: Junichi Sato (chief); Shogo Koumoto
- Produced by: Atsushi Moriyama; Tomoko Kawasaki; Masafumi Fukui; Taiji Suinou; Yoshiaki Matsumoto; Shironori Kawasaki
- Written by: Michiko Yokote
- Music by: Kaoru Wada
- Studio: Hal Film Maker
- Licensed by: AUS: Madman Entertainment (expired); NA: ADV Films (former); AEsir Holdings (former); Sentai Filmworks (expired)
- Original network: NHK, Kids Station
- English network: NA: Anime Network; SEA: Animax Asia
- Original run: August 16, 2002 – May 23, 2003
- Episodes: 26
- Manga
- Written by: Ikuko Itoh
- Illustrated by: Mizuo Shinonome
- Published by: Akita Shoten
- English publisher: NA: ADV Manga
- Magazine: Champion Red
- Original run: August 19, 2002 – May 19, 2003
- Volumes: 2
- icon

Princess Tutu (Japanese: プリンセスチュチュ, Hepburn: Purinsesu Chuchu) is a Japanese anime television series created by Ikuko Itoh and directed by Junichi Sato and Shogo Koumoto. Inspired by ballet and fairy tales, particularly The Ugly Duckling and Swan Lake, its story follows a duck who is transformed into the mythical ballerina Princess Tutu in order to save the shattered heart of a storybook prince come to life.

The series aired from August 2002 to May 2003, with 26 episodes across two seasons, and was also adapted into a two-volume manga series. Both the manga and anime series were licensed for distribution in North America by ADV Films in 2004, then by AEsir Holdings; Sentai Filmworks distributed the Blu-ray release of the anime series, as the latter two are parts of Section23 Films.

== Plot ==
There was once a writer named Drosselmeyer, who had the power to make his stories come to life. However, he died before he could finish his final tale, The Prince and the Raven, leaving its titular characters locked in an eternal battle. After many years, the Raven managed to escape into the real world, and the Prince, Siegfried, pursued him. To seal away the Raven's evil, he shattered his heart with his sword, causing him to lose his memories and emotions.

Drosselmeyer, having used his power to write himself as part of the tale to preserve his consciousness, laments that the story has come to a standstill and wants it to become a never-ending tragedy. He finds a way to restart the flow of the story in the form of a duck who has fallen in love with Mytho, the empty remainder of Siegfried. He gives her a magical pendant that can transform her, first into a human girl, then into the ballerina Princess Tutu, another character in the story. As Tutu, Duck is tasked with finding the scattered shards of Mytho's heart and returning them to him.

However, not everyone wants Mytho to get his heart back. Rue, the Raven's daughter reborn as a human, has also fallen in love with him, and fears that he may not return her feelings if he has a heart. Her desire to prevent him from regaining his emotions awakens her ability to transform into Princess Kraehe, Tutu's evil counterpart. Fakir, a boy who found and cared for Mytho after he escaped the story, also tries to stop Tutu, fearing that the story progressing means the Raven will return and Mytho will have to risk his life fighting it again.

As well, Duck learns that part of Princess Tutu's story is that she can never confess her love to Mytho, or else she will turn into a speck of light and vanish. However, after it becomes clear that Mytho wants his heart to be restored, she persists despite Fakir and Kraehe's interference.

Eventually, Fakir accepts Mytho's choice and decides to help Tutu, even discovering her true identity as a duck and befriending her. As he learns he is a descendant of Drosselmeyer and inherited his power to make what he writes a reality, Rue learns she is not the Raven's daughter, but a human child he kidnapped to serve him.

After most of Mytho's heart is returned to him, the seal imprisoning the Raven begins to break. Finally able to feel love again, Mytho realizes he loves Rue as the Raven kidnaps her. Duck discovers that her pendant is the final shard, meaning she must give up her ability to become human to return it. She eventually finds the courage to do so, and becomes a duck again.

Mytho and the Raven battle once more, but Mytho is outmatched and considers shattering his heart to seal it away again. Duck begins dancing to show him he must not give up. As she does, Fakir writes a story about how she never stops, no matter how many times the Raven's minions attack her. Together, they create hope, which gives Mytho the strength he needs to rescue Rue and defeat the Raven. Mytho asks Rue to be his princess and they return to his kingdom inside the story. Duck and Fakir remain together, although the narrator implies that Fakir is writing a new story. With nothing left to do, Drosselmeyer departs in search of another story.

== Media ==
=== Anime ===
Princess Tutu was conceptualized by Ikuko Itoh, who also designed the characters, and directed by Junichi Sato and Shogo Koumoto, with Michiko Yokote handling series composition and Kaoru Wada composing the music. It was produced by Hal Film Maker and TUTU, a production committee consisting of King Records, IMAGICA Imageworks, Dentsu, Marvelous Entertainment and Memory-Tech. The series originally aired in two seasons, from August 16, 2002, to May 23, 2003. The first season, "Kapitel des Eies" ("Chapter of the Egg"), consisted of 13 half-hour episodes. The second season, "Kapitel des Junges" ("Chapter of the Fledgling") in R2 DVDs, and "Kapitel des Kükens" ("Chapter of the Chick") in R1 DVDs, was aired as 24 quarter-hour episodes and one half-hour episode; to conform to the format of the time slot, each episode was halved. These were brought back together in the DVD release as 13 complete episodes.

==== North American release ====
In 2004, ADV Films announced that they had licensed the anime series for distribution in North America. ADV Films produced English adaptations for all episodes and, beginning in 2005, the series was periodically released as single DVD "volumes" that each contained several episodes. In 2007, the series was released as a complete DVD collection of all 26 episodes. In 2011, AEsir Holdings announced the licensing of the series and the release of a complete DVD collection of all 26 episodes distributed by Section23 Films.

In 2018, as AEsir Holdings and Sentai Filmworks are parts of Section23 Films, the latter released a complete Blu-ray collection of all 26 episodes on December 11, 2018. Steelbook release was made on December 21, 2021. Anime Network formerly offered all 26 episodes of the series, English dubbed only, from their internet streaming site for North America. After the service was shut down, the series was moved to Hidive. The English dub previously streamed on Hulu and Amazon Prime Video.

=== Manga ===
A manga adaptation of the anime series was published in Japan by Akita Shoten in the manga magazine Champion Red from August 19, 2002, to May 19, 2003. The manga was written by Mizuo Shinonome and series creator Ikuko Itoh and illustrated by Shinonome. Two tankōbon volumes of the manga were published in 2003. It was translated to English and published in North America by ADV Manga in 2004 and 2005.

==== Volumes ====
No.	Original release date	Original ISBN	English release date	English ISBN
1	March 13, 2003	978-4-2532-3040-7	November 30, 2004	978-1-4139-0193-1
When a spellbound pendant transforms Ahiru into Princess Tutu, she thinks she can finally dance her way into her beloved Mytho's heart, but there's one problem. Mytho doesn't have his heart! Princess Tutu will have to twirl her way through a dark and lonely world as she searches for the missing pieces of her true love's broken heart and wounded spirit.
2	July 17, 2003	978-4-2532-3041-4	January 25, 2005	978-1-4139-0235-8
Ahiru is now the beautiful and graceful Princess Tutu, but a happy ending for this fairy tale is still out of reach! She may have returned the pieces of Mytho's broken heart, but the jealous Princess Kraehe is determined to thwart her. Yet an even more intimidating enemy awaits Princess Tutu, and nothing but fate will decide who wins the prince's heart...

The English version of the manga uses the untranslated Japanese name "Ahiru" rather than the translated "Duck" used in the English version of the anime.

== Reception ==
English-language reviews of Princess Tutu, both before the official localization and after, have generally been very positive. Reviewers have stated that although Princess Tutu is a magical girl series, it is more of a "fairy tale set to ballet with a few magical girl elements mixed in," and its use of dance to solve conflicts, in lieu of violence, carries "surprisingly effective emotional appeal."

- The first DVD volume included episodes 1 through 5. Theron Martin reviewed this volume for Anime News Network and awarded grades from "C+" (art) to "A" (music).
- The second DVD volume included episodes 6 through 9. Zac Bertschy reviewed this volume for Anime News Network and awarded grades from "B+" (story) to "A" (most everything else).
- The fourth DVD volume included episodes 14 through 18. Theron Martin reviewed this volume and awarded grades from "B" (animation) to "A+" (music).
- The sixth DVD volume included episodes 23 through 26. Theron Martin reviewed this volume and awarded grades from "B+" (animation & art) to "A+" (music).
- The 2011 Complete Collection (DVD) release was reviewed by Chris Beveridge and given an overall grade of A−.
