= Ikuko Itoh =

Japanese animator (born 1961)

- 伊藤 郁子
- Born: August 25, 1961 (age 64); Ibaraki Prefecture, Japan
- Occupations: Animator, Character Designer, Animation Director, Illustrator
- Years active: 1980–present
- Notable work: Sailor Moon (S & SuperS); Princess Tutu

Ikuko Itoh (Japanese: 伊藤 郁子, Hepburn: Itō Ikuko; born August 25, 1961) is a Japanese animator, character designer, illustrator and animation director best known for her work on Sailor Moon and as the creator of Princess Tutu.

== Career ==
Ikuko Itoh graduated at Tokyo Designer Gakuin College, (Note: The school is now named "Tokyo Net Wave") and started working as key animator and animation director for various series and movies in 1980s.

From 1992 to 1994, she was recognized from her work as an animation director for various episodes of Sailor Moon (Sailor Moon and Sailor Moon R). After R had ended, Itoh took over Kazuko Tadano's role as a character designer from Sailor Moon S in 1994 till the end of Sailor Moon SuperS in 1995.

After Sailor Moon, she character designed for Fushigi Mahou Fun Fun Pharmacy and Magic User's Club in late 1990s.

In 2002, she created and character designed Princess Tutu, a ballet fairy tale anime that is inspired from The Ugly Duckling and Swan Lake.

From 2006 and onwards, Itoh provided character designs for Living for the Day After Tomorrow, The Disappearance of Nagato Yuki-chan, and Somali and the Forest Spirit.

== Works ==
=== Anime ===
Year	Title	Credit	Note
1983	Spoon Obasan	Key Animation	
1987	Bikkuriman	Animation Director	
1990	Magical Taruruto-kun	Animation Director (eps. 2, 8, 54, 74)	
1992	Sailor Moon	Animation Director (eps. 5, 18, 24, 31, 37, 45), Key Animation (eps. 5, 18, 24, 45)	
1993	Sailor Moon R	Animation Director (OP2; eps. 9, 12), Key Animation (eps. 9, 15, 22, 40)	
1994	Sailor Moon S	Character Design, Chief Animator, Animation Director (eps. 94, 104, 111, 124–125), Key Animation (eps. 111)	
1995	Sailor Moon SuperS	Character Design, Animation Director (eps. 139, 152, 159, 166)	
1996	Magic User's Club	Character Design, Chief Animation Director	OVA
1998	Fushigi Mahou Fun Fun Pharmacy	Character Design, Animation Director (eps. 1, 4, 9, 15, 21, 27, 33, 39, 43, 48), Key Animation	
1999	Magic User's Club	Character Design, Chief Animation Director	TV anime
2002	Princess Tutu	Original Creator, Character Design, Chief Animation Director, Animation Director (OP; eps. 21)	
2004	Jagainu-kun	Character Design, Chief Animation Director	
2006	Living for the Day After Tomorrow	Character Design, Chief Animation Director (eps. 1, 3, 5, 7, 9, 11), Animation Director (OP, ED; eps. 1, 3), Key Animation (eps. 1)	
2012-2013	AKB0048	Sub-character design, Chief Animation Director, Key Animation (eps. 1)	
2015	The Disappearance of Nagato Yuki-chan	Character Design, Chief Animation Director, Key Animation (eps. 13)	
2020	Somali and the Forest Spirit	Character Design, Chief Animation Director (eps. 1–8, 12), Animation Director (OP)	

=== Anime film ===
Year	Title	Credit	Note
1991	Magical Taruruto-kun	Assistant Animation Director, Key Animation	
1993	Sailor Moon R: The Movie	Key Animation	
2002	One Piece: Chopper's Kingdom on the Island of Strange Animals	Key Animation	
2013	Toriko the Movie: Secret Recipe of Gourmet Food	Key Animation	
2016	Pop in Q	Animation Director	
2016	Tamayura ~Sotsugyō Shashin~ -Part 4-	Animation Director	Film series
2018	Macross Delta the Movie: Passionate Walküre	Animation Director	
