= Junichi Sato =

Japanese anime director (born 1960)

- 佐藤 順一
- Born: March 11, 1960 (age 66); Aichi Prefecture, Japan
- Other names: Hadame Kiichi (甚目 喜一); Tenjō Hajime (天上 はじめ); Misoto Hajime (ミソト ハジメ); Hoshino Ranchū (星野 らんちゅう); Hikawa Sakura (ひかわ さくら)
- Education: Nihon University
- Occupation: Anime director
- Years active: 1981–present
- Employers: Toei Animation (1981–1998); Hal Film Maker (2000–2011); TYO Animations (2011–2016); Twin Engine (2017–present)
- Notable work: Maple Town; Sailor Moon (season 1); Yume no Crayon Ōkoku; Ojamajo Doremi; Princess Tutu; Kaleido Star; Sgt. Frog; ARIA; Hug! Pretty Cure
- Spouse: Yasuno Sato

Junichi Sato (佐藤 順一, Satō Jun'ichi; born March 11, 1960) is a Japanese anime director. After working for Toei Dōga (currently Toei Animation) and then TYO Animations (formerly Hal Film Maker), he joined Twin Engine in 2017.

Sato has been active since the 1980s and is a hit maker who, as series director of children's TV animation during his time at Toei Dōga, brought out the first series of long-running popular titles such as Sailor Moon and Ojamajo Doremi. After leaving Toei, he has continued to demonstrate his skills by working on popular series such as Sgt. Frog and Pretty Cure.

He won the Mainichi Film Award for Best Animation Film in 1996 and 2020 for his films.

== Early life ==
Sato was born in Nagoya and moved to Ama, when he entered junior high school, where he stayed until he moved to Tokyo for university.

== Career ==
Sato passed Toei Dōga's trainee recruitment exam while still a student in the animation course of the film department of Nihon University College of Art, and dropped out of university to join the company in 1981. Shortly before this, he had received an honorable mention for a manga he submitted to Shogakukan's call for new manga artists, and was discussing his subsequent work with the editorial department. After working as a production assistant, he passed the director's selection test around 1983.

In 1986, he was selected as the youngest series director in Toei Dōga's history for Maple Town Stories. After a minor misunderstanding, he got into trouble with the producer and was demoted to episode director of the sequel, New Maple Town Stories.

He was to have directed Studio Ghibli's 1989 film Kiki's Delivery Service, produced by Hayao Miyazaki, but left the project before it started. Negotiations between Toei and Ghibli were difficult, and Sato himself was the point of contact for the trainees in labor-management negotiations between Toei and the trainees, so it was difficult for him to announce that he would quit Toei. Ghibli's Toshio Suzuki told him he could come to Ghibli in the form of a secondment, but in the final stages Toei Dōga came to the conclusion that they would not second someone who had been brought up in-house, and he was forced to give up directing the film. Next in line to direct the film was Sunao Katabuchi, who had been involved with Hayao Miyazaki's films since his student days, but the main sponsor balked at this, and Miyazaki ended up directing the film.

Sato acted as series director on Sailor Moon since 1992. He participated in the work from the planning stage and provided input on character settings and changes from the original manga.

Sato directed the film Junkers Come Here (1995). The film was made outside Toei, but the head of the production department had changed from the time of Kiki's Delivery Service, so he was able to direct the film while still working for Toei.

Sato joined Neon Genesis Evangelion (1995) in return for asking Hideaki Anno, a Sailor Moon fan, to do key animation and storyboards for it.

Sato was asked by junior colleague Kunihiko Ikuhara to storyboard his first post-independent work, Revolutionary Girl Utena, he drew it under his real name despite it being a non-Toei film, as a pseudonym would not be celebratory.

Sato directed his first original work, Magic User's Club, after Triangle Staff offered him the chance to make an OVA. Because the previous head of the production department had returned, he could not be paid for his work outside the company via Toei. Moreover, out of consideration for Toei, he was nominally the general manager, even though his actual job was a director.

Sato worked with Takuya Igarashi as series director on Ojamajo Doremi. He was involved from the very beginning of the project, (Note: At Toei, the director was usually selected after the outline of the work had been decided by producer, writer, plus TV station producer and a toy manufacturer's representative, but for Ojamajo Doremi, Sato was invited from the very beginning.) when it was only decided to do a magical girl story. So he was able to be involved from the stage of deciding what kind of story it would be. He requested a double-headed system with two directors, as he was too busy to concentrate on Ojamajo Doremi and thought that if it was an original production, it would be better to have as many brains, especially young ones, to come up with ideas as possible.

He left Toei in 1998. When he approached the production department to produce a TV series of Magic User's Club, they asked him to do it after he had resigned and was no longer officially affiliated with Toei, so he replied 'Okay'. He then worked as a freelancer for about a year until the show ended, and then also stepped down from his position as series director of Ojamajo Doremi.

He started working for Hal Film Maker in 2000.

Sato directed Sgt. Frog in response to Sunrise's offer to make the original manga less manic and sexy and more family-friendly.

He has worked on Aria series since 2005.

The film A Whisker Away (co-directed with Tomotaka Shibayama), whose release had been postponed due to the COVID-19 pandemic, was cancelled for theatrical release and distributed worldwide on Netflix on June 18, 2020. The film Looking for Magical Doremi (co-directed with Halka Kamatani) was released in theaters on November 13.

== Style ==
Sato has directed and supervised a wide range of works for children and adults, many of which have become long-term series. He is also active in the production of original works and is actively involved from the planning stage.

During his experience at Toei, he learned a lot about how to make commercial-based animations and the know-how of children's productions. Generally in Japan, not much marketing is done in the production of animation, but in the toy business for children, it is done thoroughly. As a series director, he went to toy manufacturers with producers to discuss and decide on the design and content of the animation, including with people from the manufacturers' planning department.

On the other hand, Sato has carefully depicted the struggles children face and their family problems. He has always taken his own approach to what he cares about regarding children, as in his film Junkers Come Here, about a schoolgirl struggling with her parents' divorce.

He is a master of animation storytelling, and in robot anime (Note: In robot anime, he works mainly under the pseudonym 'Kiichi Hadame'.) he is more often asked to storyboard the everyday scenes that are the key to the drama than the battle scenes.

He is skilled at training and mentoring newcomers, and once the popularity of the series stabilised, he often steps down as director and passes the baton to his successor. During his time at Toei Dōga, many talents studied directing under him, including Kunihiko Ikuhara, Kōnosuke Uda, Takuya Igarashi and Mamoru Hosoda. He recognised Kunihiko Ikuhara's potential from a young age, and promoted him to anime magazines and other publications.

Sato considers himself more suited to TV series than films.

Although tacitly permitted, Toei Dōga basically did not allow its staff to work for other studios, so Sato used a pseudonym like the rest of the staff when participating without going through the company.

== Works ==
=== TV series ===
- Queen Millennia (1981) (production assistant)
- Patalliro! (1982) (production assistant)
- Bemubemu Hunter Kotengu Tenmaru (1983) (storyboard, episode director)
- Tongari Bōshi no Memoru ("Wee Wendy" in the U.S.) (1984) (storyboard, episode director, assistant director)
- Mobile Suit Zeta Gundam (1985) (storyboard (Note: Under the pseudonym Hadame Kiichi.))
- Hai Step Jun (1985) (assistant series director, storyboard, episode director)
- Maple Town Stories (1986) (series director)
- New Maple Town Stories: Palm Town Chapter (1986) (episode director)
- Bikkuriman (1987-1989) (episode director)
- Akuma-kun (1989) (series director, storyboard, episode director)
- The New Adventures of Kimba The White Lion (1989-1990) (storyboard (Note: Under the pseudonym Tenjō Hajime.))
- Mooretsu Atarō (1990) (series director)
- Chibi Maruko-chan (First series) (1990) (storyboard)
- Goldfish Warning! (1991) (series director (Note: Under the pseudonym Hoshino Ranchū.))
- Sailor Moon (1992-1993) (series director)
- Sailor Moon R (1993-1994) (series director, (Note: He directed up to episode 59, and Kunihiko Ikuhara took over from then on.) episode director)
- Sailor Moon S (1994-1995) (episode director)
- Macross 7 (1994-1995) (assistant head writer (Note: Under the pseudonym Misoto Hajime.))
- Sailor Moon SuperS (1995-1996) (episode director)
- World Fairy Tale Series (1995) (episode director)
- Neon Genesis Evangelion (1995-1996) (storyboard)
- GeGeGe no Kitarō (1996 TV series) (1996-1997) (storyboard, episode director)
- Sailor Moon Sailor Stars (1996-1997) (episode director)
- The Vision of Escaflowne (1996) (storyboard)
- Saber Marionette J (1996-1997) (storyboard)
- Revolutionary Girl Utena (1997) (storyboard)
- Yume no Crayon Oukoku (1997–1999) (series director)
- Cowboy Bebop (1998–1999) (storyboard)
- Saber Marionette J to X (1998–1999) (storyboard)
- Kare Kano (1998) (storyboard)
- Ojamajo Doremi (season 1) (1999–2000) (series director (Note: Co-directed with Takuya Igarashi.))
- Magic User's Club (1999) (original creator, director, sound director (Note: Uncredited.))
- Ojamajo Doremi Sharp (2000–2001) (storyboard)
- UFO Baby (2000–2002) (storyboard)
- Strange Dawn (2000) (planner, original creator, general director, sound director)
- Gate Keepers (2000) (general director)
- Sakura Wars (2000) (general director)
- Mōtto! Ojamajo Doremi (2001–2002) (storyboard)
- Prétear (2001) (original creator, general director)
- Ojamajo Doremi Dokkān! (2002–2003) (ED theme song lyrics (Note: Under the pseudonym Hikawa Sakura.)))
- Seven of Seven (2002) (storyboard)
- Princess Tutu (2002–2003) (general director, storyboard, episode director)
- The Big O (2003) (storyboard)
- Kaleido Star (First Season) (2003) (original creator, director)
- Kaleido Star: New Wings (2003–2004) (original creator, director (Note: Co-directed with Yoshimasa Hiraike.))
- Sgt. Frog (2004–2011) (general director, (Note: After the third season in 2006, he became a supervisor.) storyboard, Insert song lyrics)
- Fushigiboshi no Futagohime (2005) (general director, storyboard)
- Aria the Animation (2005) (director, head writer, scriptwriter, storyboard, sound director)
- Fushigiboshi no Futagohime Gyu! (2006) (general director, storyboard)
- Aria the Natural (2006) (director, head writer, scriptwriter, storyboard, sound director)
- Romeo × Juliet (2007) (Sound Supervisor, storyboard)
- Sketchbook ~full color'S~ (2007) (supervisor, storyboard)
- Night Wizard! (2007) (storyboard)
- Aria the Origination (2008) (director, head writer, storyboard, sound director)
- Hakaba Kitarō (2008) (storyboard)
- Shugo Chara!! Doki (2008) (supervisor)
- Vampire Knight (2008) (storyboard)
- Skip Beat! (2008) (storyboard)
- Umi Monogatari ~Anata ga Ite Kureta Koto~ (Sea Story: That You Were There For Me) (2009) (director, storyboard, sound director)
- Kiddy Girl-and (2009–2010) (storyboard, sound director)
- Mayoi Neko Overrun! (2010) (director, storyboard)
- Croisée in a Foreign Labyrinth (2011) (head writer, scriptwriter, storyboard, sound director, insert song lyrics)
- Phi Brain: Puzzle of God (2011) (director, storyboard)
- Tamayura: Hitotose (2011) (original creator, director, head writer, scriptwriter, storyboard, sound director)
- Phi Brain: Puzzle of God (2nd series) (2012) (head writer, storyboard)
- Tamayura: More Aggressive (2013) (original creator, director, head writer, scriptwriter, storyboard, sound director)
- Star Blazers: Space Battleship Yamato 2199 (2013) (storyboard)
- Phi Brain: Puzzle of God (3rd series) (2013) (head writer)
- M3 the dark metal (2014) (original creator, director, storyboard)
- Amanchu! (2016) (general director, storyboard, sound director)
- Amanchu! Advance (2018) (general director, storyboard, sound director)
- Hugtto! PreCure (2018–2019) (series director)
- Tropical-Rouge! Pretty Cure (2021) (storyboard)
- Waccha PriMagi! (2021–2022) (general director, storyboard)

=== Anime films ===
- Sleeping Beauty (1983) (director)
- Tongari Bōshi no Memoru (1985) (director)
- Bikkuriman (1987) (director)
- Akuma-kun the Movie (1989) (director)
- Akuma-kun Yōkoso Akuma Land e!! (1990) (director)
- Goldfish Warning! the Movie (1992) (director)
- Osawaga! Super Baby! (1994) (director)
- Junkers Come Here (1995) (director)
- GeGeGe no Kitarō Obake Naitā (1997) (director)
- The End of Evangelion (1997) (storyboard)
- Slayers Premium (2001) (director, screenplay,)
- Keroro Gunso the Super Movie (2006) (general director)
- Keroro Gunso the Super Movie 2: The Deep Sea Princess (2007) (general director)
- Keroro Gunso the Super Movie 3: Keroro vs. Keroro Great Sky Duel (2008) (general director)
- Keroro Gunso the Super Movie 4: Gekishin Dragon Warriors (2009) (general director)
- Evangelion: 2.0 (2008) (storyboard)
- Keroro Gunso the Super Movie 3: Keroro vs. Keroro Great Sky Duel (2008) (general director)
- Short Peace episode4: A Farewell to Weapons (2013) (story advisor)
- Penguin Highway (2014) (creative advisor)
- A Whisker Away (2020, Netflix) (director, (Note: Co-directed with Tomotaka Shibayama.) storyboard, episode director, sound director)
- Penguin Highway (2022, Netflix) (creative advisor)
- Looking for Magical Doremi (2020) (Director, (Note: Co-directed with Haruka Kamatani.) storyboard)
- Aria the Crepusculo (2021) (general director, scriptwriter)
- Aria the Benedizione (2021) (general director, scriptwriter)

=== Original video animation ===
- Mobile Suit Gundam 0080: War in the Pocket (1989) (storyboard)
- TOKUMA Anime Video Ehon Hana Ichimonme Episode 3 (1990) (director)
- TOKUMA Anime Video Ehon Hana Ichimonme Episode 6 (1990) (director, scriptwriter)
- Kimama ni Idol (1990) (director, Scriptwriter)
- Little Twins (1992) (storyboard, episode director)
- Magic User's Club (1996) (original creator, storyboard, executive producer)
- Jigoku-dō Reikai Tsūshin (1996) (general director, episode director)
- Sorcerer Hunters (1997) (storyboard))
- Gate Keepers21 (2002) (storyboard, episode director)
- Kaleido Star: New Wings -Extra Stage- (2004) (original creator, director)
- Ojamajo Doremi Na-i-sho (2004) (supervisor, storyboard.)
- Kaleido Star: Legend of phoenix 〜Layla Hamilton Monogatari〜 (2005) (original creator, director, sound director)
- Kaleido Star: Good da yo! Goood!! (2006) (original creator, supervisor, sound director)
- Aria the OVA: Arietta (2007) (director, scriptwriter, storyboard, sound director)
- Tamayura (2010) (original creator, director, head writer, scriptwriter, storyboard, sound director)
- One Off (2012) (original creator, director)
- Zetsumetsu Kigu Shōjo Amazing Twins (2014) (original creator, director)
- Tamayura: Sotsugyō Shashin (2015) (original creator, director, head writer, sound director)

=== Web animation ===
- Gate Keepers21 (2009) (supervisor, sound director)
- Pure Dragon (2011) (director)
- Akuma-kun (2023, Netflix) (general director)

== Awards and honours ==
- The 50th Mainichi Film Award for Best Animation Film (Junkers Come Here)
- The 75th Mainichi Film Award for Best Animation Film (Looking for Magical Doremi) (Note: He received the award jointly with Haruka Kamatani.)
- The 24th Japan Media Arts Festival Animation Division Excellence Award (A Whisker Away) (Note: He received the award jointly with Tomotaka Shibayama.)
