= Yudo: The Way of the Bath =

2022 Japanese comedy film

Yudo: The Way of the Bath (湯道) is a 2022 Japanese comedy film directed by Masayuki Suzuki and written by Kundō Koyama.

== Plot ==
Two brothers own their Showa era bath house, Shirō (Tōma Ikuta) and Gorō (Gaku Hamada). However Shiro decides he wants to sell it, creating a rift between the two.

The story revolves around Marukin, a sentō in a town run by Goro (Gaku Hamada), who is aided in this effort by the enthusiastic Izumi (Kanna Hashimoto).

The bath's customers are a small group of everyday locals, with their own quirks.

Things start to challenge Goro when his older brother Shiro (Toma Ikuta) returns to the town. Shiro has failed in Tokyo, in his chosen profession of architect. As co owner of the bath house, after the death of his father recently, Shiro plans to knock the building down and build apartments on it.

Goro fights his plan, while the locals also get involved to try to save the Onsen. However, Goro knows the bath is losing money and something must be done...

== Cast ==
- Toma Ikuta as Big Toshi
- Gaku Hamada as Gamera
- Kanna Hashimoto as Akia
- Fumiyo Kohinata as Manzo
- Yoshimi Tendo
- Chris Hart as Ken
- Keiko Toda
- Susumu Terajima
- Atsugiri Jason
- Kazuyuki Asano
- Takashi Sasano
- Kazuko Yoshiyuki
- Eiji Wentz
- Nao Asahi
- Zen Kajihara
- Yōsuke Ōmizu
- Keiko Horiuchi
- Kanna Mori
- Tomoko Fujita
- Meru Nukumi
- Kōtarō Yoshida (special appearance)
- Masataka Kubota (special appearance)
- Mari Natsuki
- Takuzō Kadono
- Akira Emoto

== Production ==
The film was shot in Osaka, Japan in 2022. Directed by: Masayuki Suzuki, run time of 123 minutes

== Reception ==
SAF Movie Reviews rated it 80 of 100. They described it as a feel good slice of life movie about Japanese bathing culture but criticized some low level comedy bits.

Bavner Donaldo, an Indonesian film critic writing for Cinejour, rated the film 3.9 out of 5 starts, describing it as a delightful and heartwarming comedy that explores Japanese bathhouse culture with warmth and humor.
