= Looking for Magical Doremi =

2020 Japanese film by Toei Animation

- Theatrical release poster
- Kanji: 魔女見習いをさがして
- Revised Hepburn: Majo Minarai o Sagashite
- Directed by: Haruka Kamatani; Junichi Sato
- Screenplay by: Midori Kuriyama (Note: Pen name of series head writer Takashi Yamada.)
- Produced by: Hiromi Seki
- Starring: Aoi Morikawa; Rena Matsui; Kanako Momota
- Cinematography: Tomokazu Shiratori
- Edited by: Shigeru Nishiyama
- Music by: Keiichi Oku
- Production company: Toei Animation
- Distributed by: Toei Company, Ltd.
- Release dates: November 3, 2020 (Tokyo); November 13, 2020
- Running time: 91 minutes
- Country: Japan
- Language: Japanese
- Box office: ¥245,957,520

Looking for Magical Doremi (魔女見習いをさがして, Majo Minarai o Sagashite; lit. "Looking for Witch Apprentices") is a 2020 Japanese drama and coming-of-age animated film produced by Toei Animation for the 20th anniversary of the magical girl anime series Ojamajo Doremi (known internationally as Magical Doremi), which aired from 1999 to 2005. The film is directed by Haruka Kamatani and Junichi Sato. The events of the film are set in modern-day Japan and star Aoi Morikawa, Rena Matsui, and Kanako Momota in the roles of three women of different backgrounds who grew up watching Ojamajo Doremi. The film was first screened at the 33rd Tokyo International Film Festival on November 3 before being released to the general public on November 13, 2020.

Planning for the film began in September 2016, with the project formally announced in March 2019. Aiming for an adult female audience outside of Ojamajo Doremi fans, Toei Animation focused on the various common struggles Japanese women face in their daily lives, with each main character representing a particular generation. Upon release, Looking for Magical Doremi was praised for its themes of rediscovering the joys of life in adulthood through childhood. The film won Best Animation Film Award at the 75th Mainichi Film Awards.

== Plot ==
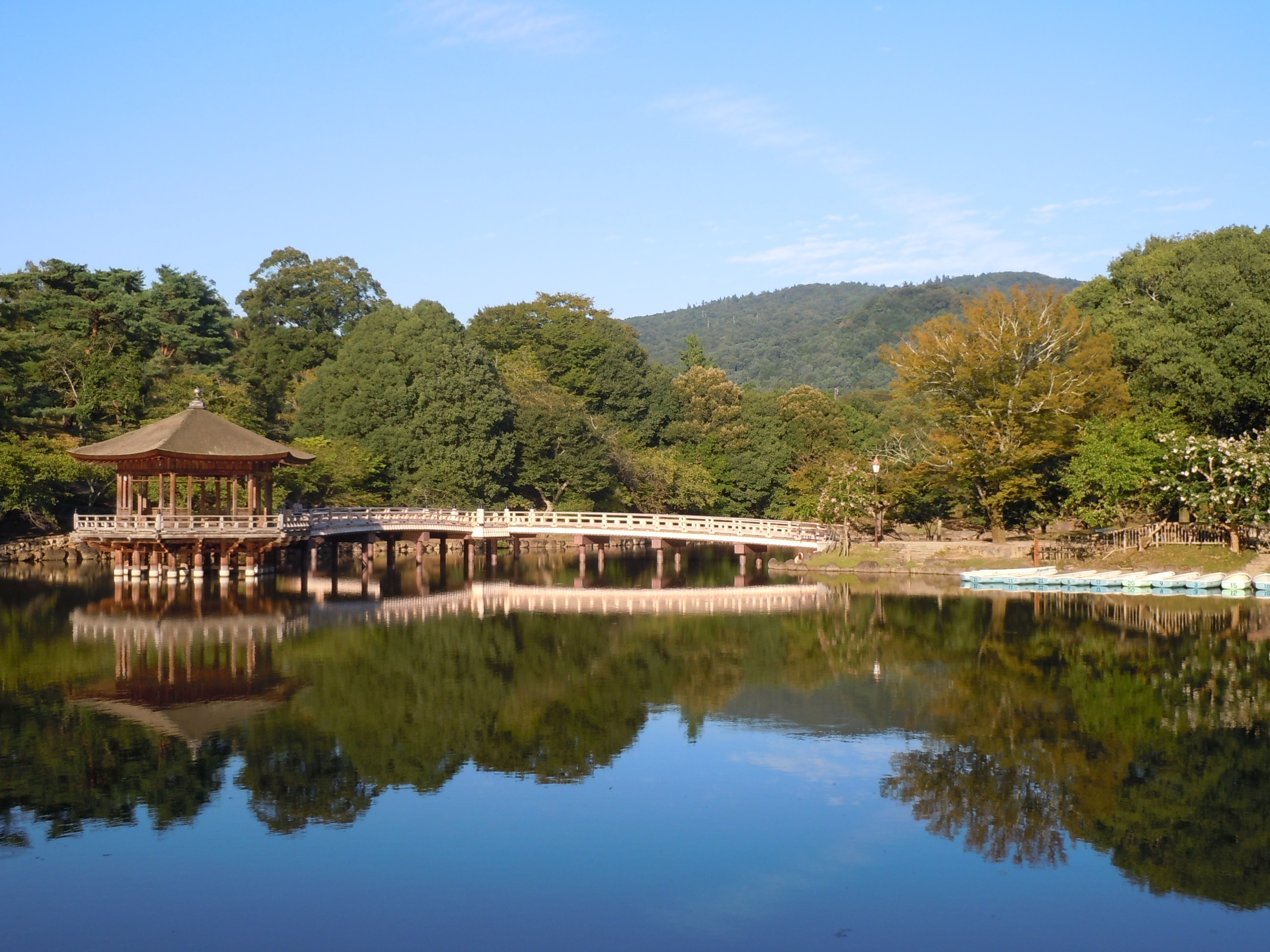
Nara Park is one of the locations that Sore, Mire, Reika, and Omiya visit in the final third of Looking for Magical Doremi, as the location was featured in episode 11 of Ojamajo Doremi Dokkān!

The film is centered on three women who grew up watching Ojamajo Doremi in their childhood: Sora Nagase, a 22-year-old college student whose parents are pressuring her to become a teacher; Mire Yoshizuki, a 27-year-old career-oriented office worker returning from overseas; and Reika Kawatani, a 20-year-old freeter. Sora is concerned about Yūji Makita, a student with a learning disability at the school she interns at; despite having her dream job, Mire feels disrespected by her managers; and Reika's boyfriend, Seiya Kubo, keeps stealing her savings for college. One day, Sora becomes curious when she hears rumors about a Western-style building located in Kamakura that served as the basis for the Mahodo, a magic shop featured in Ojamajo Doremi. When she visits, she meets Mire and Reika, who explore the building with her. That evening, the women bond over having watched Ojamajo Doremi when they were younger and the magic bead toys from the show. The women return home, but keep in contact.

As their daily lives become stressful, Sora invites Mire and Reika to visit Aichi Prefecture for Golden Week. There, the women go sightseeing in Hida-Takayama, the location where the film Ojamajo Doremi: The Secret of the Frog Stone takes place. At night, while discussing concerns from their daily lives, Reika confides in them that her father left after her parents divorced when she was in high school, with her mother dying two years later. On the third day of their trip, Mire suggests Reika make a wish on her magic bead to reunite with her father. The three are led to a hospital trying to retrieve her bead after she drops it. There, Reika sees her father with a new family while he pretends he does not know her. Mire chides Reika for not being assertive, but this causes Reika to become angry and return to Onomichi alone. That night, Mire stays at Sora's house and reflects on her actions after watching episode 19 of Ojamajo Doremi Sharp, where Doremi and Hazuki get into a fight. She then personally goes to Onomichi to apologize and manages to find Reika's apartment through the okonomiyaki shop that she works at. Upon finding Reika, Mire saves her from Seiya when he extorts her for money, with Reika finally breaking up with him. The two restore their friendship as Reika reveals that her magic bead was given to her by her father. Mire invites her to move in to help her pursue her studies.

Tired of being treated poorly at her job, Mire decides to quit and later learns that her co-worker, Hayato Yabe, has feelings for her. Meanwhile, Yūji is enrolled into a special education school, and Sora helps him successfully, gaining motivation to study for her teaching exams. By summer, the three women go to Nara and Kyoto, where two episodes of Ojamajo Doremi Dokkān! take place. While on the train, the women befriend Ryuichi Omiya, a college student. After noticing he has a keyholder of Onpu, they discover he is also a fan of Ojamajo Doremi and he comes along their trip as their guide. Sora falls in love with Omiya and confesses to him during their final day in Kyoto, but he rejects her. Despite this, at night, the three women realize the importance of moving forward, which they have understood since reconnecting with Ojamajo Doremi. Together, the three make a wish upon their magic beads as if to cast Magical Stage, concluding that they have magic in themselves.

Three months after their trip, Sora, Mire, and Reika rent the building in Kamakura to open it under the name Café MAHODO as the culmination of all their dreams combined. They see a silhouette running in the halls in the process, and after giving chase, they find Doremi, Hazuki, Aiko, Onpu, Momoko, and Pop.

== Cast ==
- Aoi Morikawa as Sora Nagase (長瀬ソラ), a 22-year-old college student from Aichi Prefecture in her fourth year who watched the original broadcast of Ojamajo Doremi Dokkān! as a child.
- Rena Matsui as Mire Yoshizuki (吉月ミレ), a 27-year-old career-oriented office worker from Tokyo who grew up overseas and first watched Ojamajo Doremi on DVD.
- Kanako Momota as Reika Kawatani (川谷レイカ), a 20-year-old freeter from Hiroshima who watched re-runs of Ojamajo Doremi; while she was in high school, her father left her family after her parents' divorce and her mother died two years later.
- Shohei Miura as Ryuichi Omiya (大宮竜一), a fourth-year college student who meets the three women during their road trip and is a fan of Ojamajo Doremi, particularly Onpu. Miura described Omiya as a "pure" boy with a "slightly clumsy" side.
- Akira Ishida as Hayato Yabe (矢部隼人), Mire's co-worker who is a year her junior and in love with her. He has worked with her for two years. Ishida described Yabe as a "cute" and "puppyish" character who chases after Mire and portrayed him as someone who is "doing his best to live in the real world" while trying to protect her.
- Kenta Hamano as Seiya Kubo (久保聖也), Reika's freeloading boyfriend who dreams of being a professional musician and steals Reika's college funds to play pachinko. Hamano was surprised upon learning about Seiya's character, but he described him as not being a bad person initially and has a charm that makes it difficult for Reika to push him away.
- Chiemi Chiba as Doremi Harukaze (春風どれみ), a character from Ojamajo Doremi; Chiba also makes a cameo as one of the sisters in the park
- Tomoko Akiya as Hazuki Fujiwara (藤原はづき), a character from Ojamajo Doremi; Akiya also makes a cameo as one of the sisters in Hida-Takayama
- Yuki Matsuoka as Aiko Seno (妹尾あいこ), a character from Ojamajo Doremi; Matsuoka also makes a cameo as one of the sisters in Hida-Takayama
- Rumi Shishido as Onpu Segawa (瀬川おんぷ), a character from Ojamajo Doremi; Shishido also makes a cameo as one of Reika's customers
- Nami Miyahara as Momoko Asuka (飛鳥ももこ), a character from Ojamajo Doremi; Miyahara also makes a cameo as a boy in Hida-Takayama
- Sawa Ishige as Pop Harukaze (春風ぽっぷ), a character from Ojamajo Doremi; Ishige also makes a cameo as one of the sisters in the park
- Hyosei as Yūji Makita (牧田祐司), a student at a special education school where Sora interns at; Hyosei provided the voice to Tetsuya Kotake in Ojamajo Doremi
- Nobuaki Kanemitsu as Miyao (宮尾課長, Miyao-kachō), the section manager of Mire's department; Kanemitsu provided the voice to Oyajide in Ojamajo Doremi
- Mayumi Shintani as the owner of the okonomiyaki shop
- Jun'ichi Sugawara as Tetsuji Tamaki (玉木哲司), Reika's father; Sugawara provided the voice to Kotaro's grandfather in Ojamajo Doremi
- Yuka Tokumitsu as Tamaki's wife; Tokumitsu provided the voice to Dodo in Ojamajo Doremi
- Haruka Shiraishi as Tamaki's daughter
- Atsugiri Jason as Ezekiel (エゼキエル), Mire's business partner.
- K Dub Shine as a representative, Mire's business partner.

Chiemi Chiba, Tomoko Akiya, Yuki Matsuoka, Rumi Shishido, Nami Miyahara, and Sawa Ishige reprise their roles and also cameo in several minor roles throughout the film. Other voice actors who had recurring roles in Ojamajo Doremi, including Hyosei, Ai Nagano, Megumi Takamura, Nobuaki Kanemitsu, Yuka Tokumitsu, Kenji Nomura, Nanaho Katsuragi, Kyousei Tsukui, Chihiro Sakurai, Kinoko Yamada, and Yūta Mochizuki also make voice cameos.

== Production ==
=== Development ===
The film project was first announced at AnimeJapan 2019 on March 23, 2019, to celebrate the franchise's 20th anniversary. On October 29, 2019, the production team revealed at the 32nd Tokyo International Film Festival that the film would be titled Looking for Magical Doremi and its story details, as well as announcing that staff members who worked on Ojamajo Doremi would be returning for the project, including director Junichi Sato, scriptwriter Takashi Yamada (credited under the pseudonym Midori Kuriyama), character designer Yoshihiko Umakoshi, and producer Hiromi Seki. Pretty Cure writer Haruka Kamatani was also announced as a co-director of the film.

Sato and Seki began planning for the film project around September 2016. Sato was initially going to have the film centered on Doremi and the other main characters of the original anime as adults, with a "miracle" happening through a time paradox. After pitching the idea to Umakoshi, Umakoshi suggested focusing on a wider age appeal; he voiced concerns that since Doremi and her classmates were the same age, this would alienate viewers who would not relate to the characters due to not being in the same age range. Similarly, Yamada, who also wrote the Ojamajo Doremi 16 light novel series, elaborated that an earlier idea for the film would be about a 20-year-old Doremi trying to dig up a time capsule she and her friends buried during their elementary school graduation ceremony, only to find that it is missing, starting a search of what happened on the day it disappeared. He stated that while the story would have appealed to fans of Ojamajo Doremi, it would not have appealed to a general audience. Seki then researched concerns that from women in their 20s would have about their daily lives in order to find common ground. After agreeing to focus on a general audience instead of only Ojamajo Doremi fans, the staff created Sora, Mire, and Reika as the main characters with varying ages to show their generational differences. Approximately 100 women and men participated in the survey and the results were given to Yamada.

Yamada stated that Sora, Mire, and Reika were not based on anyone, and that each character borrowed traits from the main characters of Ojamajo Doremi: Sora wore glasses like Hazuki and had Doremi's "teacher" personality; Mire had Onpu's outspoken personality and was also a returnee like Momoko; and Reika had Aiko's responsible personality, Hana's face, and a tendency to fall in love with terrible men like Doremi. In comparison to Ojamajo Doremi's child-friendly setting, Looking for Magical Doremi contained eight scenes where the characters are drinking alcohol at a bar instead of coffee at a café. Seki noted that the setting felt natural as the characters were adults, especially Mire, who is often stressed with her job. Seki also came up with the idea that Mire's apartment is messy.

For Ojamajo Doremi, instead of using "light and cute" backgrounds that were expected for children's television shows, Sato opted to use "heavier tones" of color to create a more "mature taste" that would "bring more depth to the world." Looking for Magical Doremi kept the same art scheme of not being too dark or too light. The art team also tried to keep balance between "picturesque" backgrounds and realism, but because Looking for Magical Doremi is set in the real world and in a separate setting from Ojamajo Doremi, the film leaned more on realism. In addition, Sato revealed that the dandelion motif present in Ojamajo Doremi and Looking for Magical Doremi was a nod to Yume no Crayon Oukoku, which Sato, Kuriyama, and Seki had worked on prior to Ojamajo Doremi, as the show had ended with a piece of fluff flying in the sky.

Voice work for the film concluded in September 2020. The original six voice actresses of Ojamajo Doremi attended the final day of recording to record their lines for the final scene after Morikawa, Matsui, and Momota recorded their lines. During that time, Nami Miyahara coached Rena Matsui with her English lines, as her character, Mire, was described to be from overseas. On October 1, 2020, a promotional event was held at Marunouchi Toei announcing that production of the film had concluded.

=== Casting ===
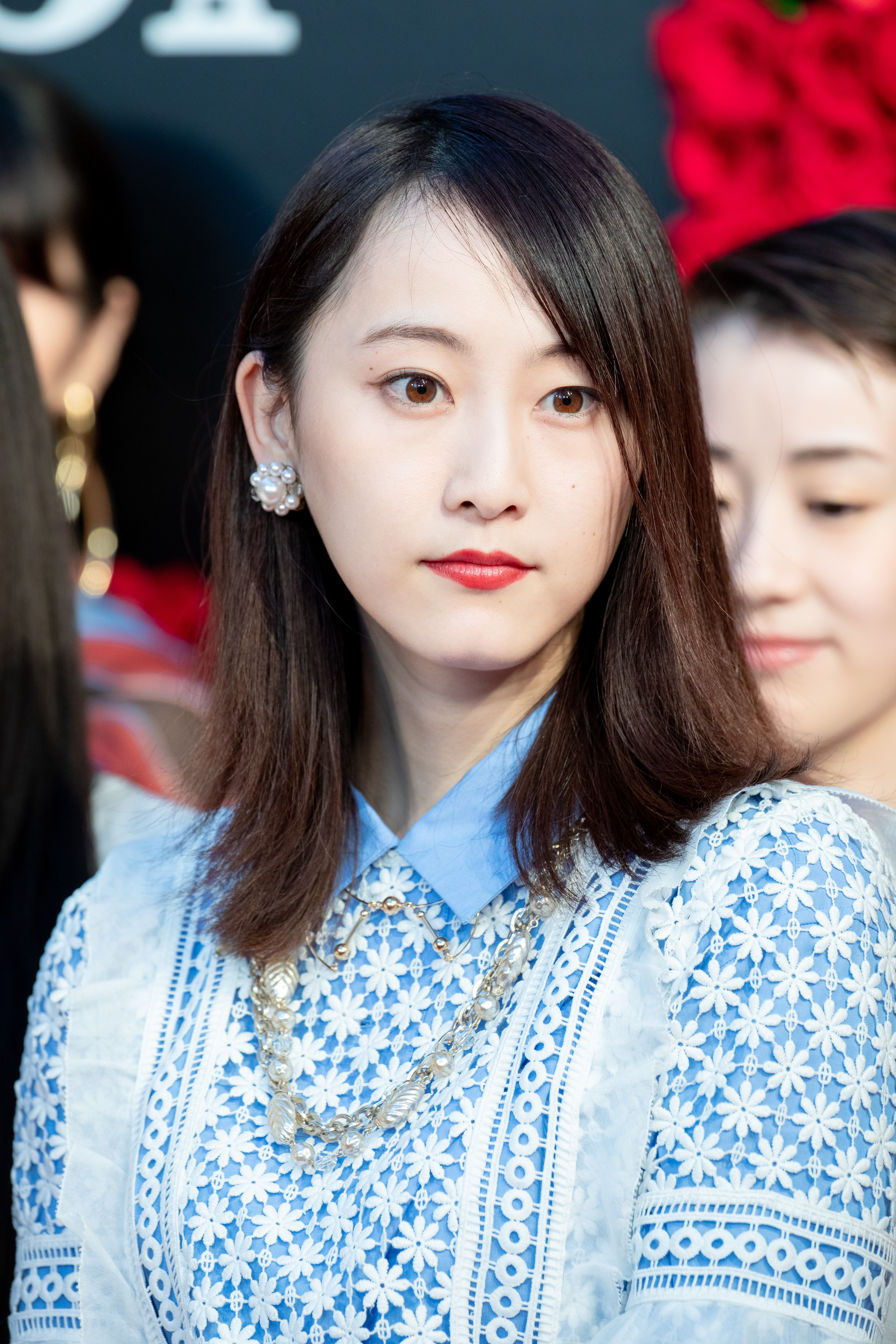
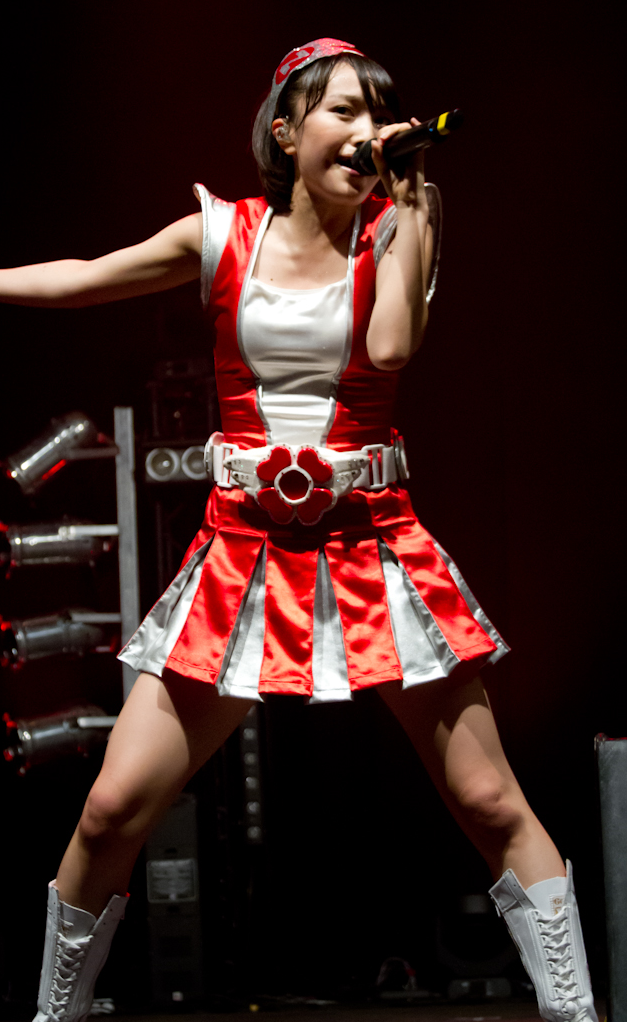
Rena Matsui (left, 2018) and Kanako Momota (right, 2012) starred in the film as Mire Yoshizuki and Reika Kawatani, respectively

In February 2020, Toei announced that the starring cast consisted of Aoi Morikawa as Sora Nagase, Rena Matsui as Mire Yoshizuki, and Momoiro Clover Z member Kanako Momota as Reika Kawatani. Additional cast members were announced in March 2020, consisting of Shohei Miura as Ryuichi Omiya, Akira Ishida as Hayato Yabe, and Kenta Hamano as Seiya Kubo, who play three male characters involved with the main characters' lives.

For the starring cast, the production staff decided to choose actors and actresses who had grown up watching Ojamajo Doremi. Morikawa caught the attention of the staff after posting about the film project's announcement on social media. Hiromi Seki had personally sent a letter to Morikawa after seeing her acting in the live-action television drama adaptation of Kakafukaka and envisioned Sora to be like the character she portrayed. Likewise, Miura, who had also watched Ojamajo Doremi when he was young, mentioned the film's announcement on social media and his radio show, after which he later heard he had received an offer. He stated that, like his character Ryuichi Omiya, Onpu was his favorite character from the series, which Seki confirmed was coincidental.

As Morikawa had no voice acting experience prior, Sato and Kamatani provided her with examples and techniques on how to convey emotions through her voice. Likewise, Matsui visited one of Akira Ishida's recording sessions to observe how to voice act. Momota, on the other hand, had voice acting experience but stated that she still faced difficulties, as it was the first time she had recorded lines in a group setting.

In addition to the film cast, Chiemi Chiba, Tomoko Akiya, Yuki Matsuoka, Rumi Shishido, Nami Miyahara, and Sawa Ishige reprise their roles as Doremi Harukaze, Hazuki Fujiwara, Aiko Seno, Onpu Segawa, Momoko Asuka, and Pop Harukaze from the Ojamajo Doremi anime series. The voice actresses also cameo in several minor roles throughout the film. Other voice actors who had recurring roles in Ojamajo Doremi, including Hyosei, Ai Nagano, Megumi Takamura, Nobuaki Kanemitsu, Yuka Tokumitsu, Kenji Nomura, Nanaho Katsuragi, Kyousei Tsukui, Chihiro Sakurai, Kinoko Yamada, and Yūta Mochizuki also make cameos. Media personality Atsugiri Jason and rapper K Dub Shine make a cameo as Mire's business partners.

=== Music ===
Looking for Magical Doremi: Music Collection

Soundtrack album by Various artists
- Released: December 23, 2020
- Label: Nippon Columbia
- Producer: Keiichi Oku

The original soundtrack was produced by Keiichi Oku and was released on December 23, 2020, under the name Looking for Magical Doremi: Music Collection (映画『魔女見習いをさがして』ミュージック・コレクション). It charted at #86 on the Oricon Weekly Albums Chart on its first week of release. The film's opening theme song is "Ojamajo Carnival!! (Majo Minarai o Sagashite Version)" by MAHODO (Chiemi Chiba, Tomoko Akiya, Yuki Matsuoka, Rumi Shishido and Nami Miyahara), featuring a new arrangement. Seki had requested Keiichi Oku to re-arrange "Ojamajo Carnival!!" with a new melody that would be fitting for a drama. The ending theme is a cover of "Owaranai Monogatari (Majo Minarai o Sagashite ver.)" by Rumi Shishido performing as Onpu Segawa. All tracks are arranged by Keiichi Oku.

No.	Title	Lyrics	Music	Length
1.	"Prologue (Mirai ga Mienai San-nin)" (プロローグ-未来が見えない三人 (lit. "Prologue: The Future the Three Can't See"))	—	Keiichi Oku	3:52
2.	"Ojamajo Carnival!!" (Majo Minarai o Sagashite ver. / Movie Size おジャ魔女カーニバル!! (魔女見習いをさがして Version))	Shōko Ōmori	Takeshi Ike	1:38
3.	"MAHODO Nite (Dorobō)!?" (MAHO堂にて～どろぼう!? (lit. "There's a Thief in the MAHODO?!"))	—	Keiichi Oku	1:10
4.	"San-nin no Deai" (三人の出会い (lit. "The Three Meet"))	—	Keiichi Oku	2:36
5.	"Mahōdama ga Tsunagu Mono" (魔法玉がつなぐもの (lit. "The Thing that Connects to the Magic Beads"))	—	Keiichi Oku	1:16
6.	"Mire, Okori no Tēma Sono 1" (ミレ 怒りのテーマ・その1 (lit. "Mire, Theme of Anger Part 1"))	—	Keiichi Oku	0:40
7.	"Seiya no Gitā (Intro)" (聖也のギター(イントロ) (lit. "Seiya's Guitar (Intro)"))	—	Keiichi Oku	0:30
8.	"Iza, Takayama e!" (いざ高山へ! (lit. "Now, Onwards to Takayama!"))	—	Keiichi Oku	2:40
9.	"I Love Hida Beef (Damasareteru!?)" (アイラブ飛騨ビーフ□～だまされてる!? (lit. "I Love Hida Beef (Are We Being Fooled?!)"))	—	Keiichi Oku	0:48
10.	"Shirakawa-gō (Tanoshii Hitotoki)" (白川郷-楽しいひととき (lit. "A Short Fun Time at Shirakawa Village"))	—	Keiichi Oku	1:01
11.	"Jishin o Nakushita Sora" (自信をなくしたソラ (lit. "Sora Lost Her Confidence"))	—	Keiichi Oku	1:11
12.	"Reika no Setsunai Kioku" (レイカの切ない記憶 (lit. "Reika's Sad Memories"))	—	Keiichi Oku	1:00
13.	"Takayama Kankō (Mazu wa Doko ni Ikun Deshita kke?)" (高山観光-まずはどこに行くんでしたっけ? (lit. "Sightseeing in Takayama (Where Did We Go First?)"))	—	Keiichi Oku	1:24
14.	"Korogaru Mahōdama" (転がる魔法玉 (lit. "The Magic Beads Roll"))	—	Keiichi Oku	1:24
15.	"Reika no Tsurai Omoi" (レイカの辛い思い (lit. "Reika's Painful Thoughts"))	—	Keiichi Oku	1:40
16.	"Hansei Suru Mire" (反省するミレ (lit. "Mire Reflects"))	—	Keiichi Oku	1:21
17.	"Onomichi (Ima Sugu ni Ayamaritai)" (尾道-いますぐに謝りたい (lit. "Onomichi (I Want to Apologize Right Now)"))	—	Keiichi Oku	2:38
18.	"Otōsan no Omoide" (お父さんとの思い出 (lit. "Memories of Dad"))	—	Keiichi Oku	1:32
19.	"Mire, Okori no Tēma Sono 2" (ミレ 怒りのテーマ・その2 (lit. "Mire, Theme of Anger Part 2"))	—	Keiichi Oku	2:12
20.	"Mire, Okori no Tēma Sono 3" (ミレ 怒りのテーマ・その3 (lit. "Mire, Theme of Anger Part 3"))	—	Keiichi Oku	0:52
21.	"Restaurant BGM" (レストランBGM)	—	Keiichi Oku	1:21
22.	"Yabe no Shittai" (矢部の失態 (lit. "Yabe's Mistake"))	—	Keiichi Oku	0:51
23.	"Sora-sensei to Makita-kun, Hikari ga Sashite" (ソラ先生と牧田くん。光がさして (lit. "Ms. Sora and Makita (The Light is Shining)"))	—	Keiichi Oku	2:48
24.	"Let's Go Shūgaku Ryokō!!" (レッツゴー修学旅行!! (lit. "Let's Go, School Trip!!"))	—	Keiichi Oku	1:19
25.	"Nara Kankō (Yo-nin no Tanoshii Hitotoki)" (奈良観光-四人の楽しいひととき (lit. "Sightseeing in Nara (A Short Fun Time with the Four)"))	—	Keiichi Oku	1:40
26.	"Shizuka na Fuan" (静かな不安 (lit. "A Quiet Concern"))	—	Keiichi Oku	1:00
27.	"Sannenzaka (Saka no Tochū de)" (三年坂-坂の途中で (lit. "Sannenzaka (In the Middle of the Slope)"))	—	Keiichi Oku	1:30
28.	"Togetsukyō (Sora to Ōmiya no Sunao na Kimochi)" (渡月橋-ソラと大宮の素直なきもち (lit. "Togetsukyō (Sora and Omiya's True Feelings)"))	—	Keiichi Oku	3:04
29.	"Yopparai" (よっぱらい (lit. "Drunk"))	—	Keiichi Oku	1:03
30.	"Yasashii Yoru" (やさしい夜 (lit. "Gentle Night"))	—	Keiichi Oku	1:40
31.	"Yume to Sorezore no Mahō" (夢とそれぞれの魔法 (lit. "Dreams and Each and Every Magic"))	—	Keiichi Oku	3:43
32.	"Soko ni Aru Mahō" (そこにある魔法 (lit. "There's Magic Over There"))	—	Keiichi Oku	1:18
33.	"Ojamajo Carnival!!" (+Kodomo-tachi Version / Movie Size おジャ魔女カーニバル!! (+子供たち Version) (lit. "Ojamajo Carnival!!" (+Kids Version)))	Shōko Ōmori	Takeshi Ike	1:19
34.	"Owaranai Monogatari" (Majo Minarai o Sagashite Version / Movie Size 終わらない物語 (魔女見習いをさがして Version) (lit. "Endless Story" (Looking for Magical Doremi Version)))	Nozomi Inoue	Nozomi Inoue	3:39
35.	"Ojamajo Carnival!!" (Majo Minarai o Sagashite Version おジャ魔女カーニバル!! (魔女見習いをさがして Version) (lit. "Ojamajo Carnival!!" (Looking for Magical Doremi Version)))	Shōko Ōmori	Takeshi Ike	3:48
36.	"Ojamajo Carnival!!" (+Kodomo-tachi Version おジャ魔女カーニバル!! (+子供たち Version) (lit. "Ojamajo Carnival!!" (+Kids Version)))	Shōko Ōmori	Takeshi Ike	3:39
37.	"Owaranai Monogatari" (Majo Minarai o Sagashite Version 終わらない物語 (魔女見習いをさがしてVersion) (lit. "Endless Story" (Looking for Magical Doremi Version)))	Nozomi Inoue	Nozomi Inoue	3:59
38.	"Owaranai Monogatari" (Majo Minarai o Sagashite Onpu Only Version / Bonus Track 終わらない物語 (魔女見習いをさがして・おんぷOnly Version) (lit. "Endless Story" (Looking for Magical Doremi, Onpu Only Version)))	Nozomi Inoue	Nozomi Inoue	3:58
Total length:				1:31:21

== Release and marketing ==
Looking for Magical Doremi was originally scheduled for release on May 15, 2020, but in March 2020, it was postponed due to the COVID-19 pandemic to Q4 2020. It was then screened at the 33rd Tokyo International Film Festival on November 3, 2020, later releasing nationwide in Japan on November 13, 2020. Looking for Magical Doremi opened at #4 and grossed a cumulative total of ¥74,061,680 on its opening weekend. By its fourth weekend, it grossed a cumulative total of ¥245,957,520.

To promote the film, Looking for Magical Doremi collaborated with various fashion and character brands, such as The Kiss, Ichiban Kuji, Sanrio, and Earth Music & Ecology. Advance tickets for the film were sold with Kit Kats with promotional packaging beginning on September 18, 2020. In accordance with the film's themes, Looking for Magical Doremi was also used to promote the Database on Promotion of Women's Participation and Advancement in the Workplace, a government job database aimed at Japanese women. The theatrical film poster for Looking for Magical Doremi also appeared in episode 16 of Healin' Good Pretty Cure, another magical girl series by Toei Animation.

The film was screened in the United Kingdom as part of Scotland Loves Anime Festival in 2021.

== Reception ==
Richard Eisenbeis from Anime News Network reviewed the film favorably, stating that the film presents a relatable message and doesn't rely on background knowledge of Ojamajo Doremi. Writing for Cinema Today, Hibiki Kurei gave the film 4 out of 5 stars, describing the film as a depiction of "otaku friendship" aimed at adults and praising it for touching upon the harshness of daily life. Kei Onodera from Real Sound praised the film for its strong character development and analysis on the loss of childhood ideals after reaching adulthood, commenting that the inclusion of Haruka Kamatani was a positive choice in developing a film appealing to women younger than the original audience of Ojamajo Doremi. Natalie's editorial department listed reviews from celebrities including Rio Uchida, Yudai Chiba, Emi Oomatsu, Kemio, manga artist Tsuzui, and Meru Nukumi, who all expressed nostalgia for Ojamajo Doremi and stated that, like the main characters of the film, they were able to remember the importance of the "magic" in their lives. Looking for Magical Doremi won the Best Animation Film Award at the 75th Mainichi Film Awards. When the film was broadcast on NHK on December 31, 2021, it earned a 0.7% rating.
