= Mainichi Film Award for Best Animation Film =

Annual Japanese film awards

Animation Film Award
- Country: Japan
- First award: 1989

The Animation Film Award (アニメーション映画賞) is an award given to the best animated feature film at the Mainichi Film Awards. The award was established to reward large scale cinematic animation, enabling the Ōfuji Noburō Award to focus on shorter pieces. This award was first presented in 1989 for Kiki's Delivery Service (魔女の宅急便, Majo no Takkyūbin) by Hayao Miyazaki.

== Winners ==
No.	Year	Title	Studio	Director
1	1989	Kiki's Delivery Service	Studio Ghibli	Hayao Miyazaki
2	1990	Hashire! Shiroi Ōkami	Group TAC	Tsuneo Maeda
3	1991	Roujin Z	A.P.P.P.	Hiroyuki Kitakubo
4	1992	Porco Rosso	Studio Ghibli	Hayao Miyazaki
5	1993	Patlabor 2: The Movie	Production I.G	Mamoru Oshii
6	1994	Pom Poko	Studio Ghibli	Isao Takahata
7	1995	Junkers Come Here	Triangle Staff	Junichi Sato
8	1996	Black Jack	Tezuka Productions	Satoshi Kuwabara
9	1997	Princess Mononoke	Studio Ghibli	Hayao Miyazaki
10	1998	Doraemon: Nobita's Great Adventure in the South Seas	Shin-Ei Animation	Tsutomu Shibayama
11	1999	Jin-Roh: The Wolf Brigade	Production I.G	Hiroyuki Okiura
12	2000	Doraemon: A Grandmother's Recollections	Shin-Ei Animation	Ayumu Watanabe
13	2001	Spirited Away	Studio Ghibli	Hayao Miyazaki
14	2002	Crayon Shin-chan: The Storm Called: The Battle of the Warring States	Shin-Ei Animation	Keiichi Hara
15	2003	Tokyo Godfathers	Madhouse	Satoshi Kon
16	2004	The Place Promised in Our Early Days	CoMix Wave Films	Makoto Shinkai
17	2005	Fullmetal Alchemist the Movie: Conqueror of Shamballa	Bones	Seiji Mizushima
18	2006	The Girl Who Leapt Through Time	Madhouse	Mamoru Hosoda
19	2007	Summer Days with Coo	Shin-Ei Animation	Keiichi Hara
20	2008	The Sky Crawlers	Production I.G	Mamoru Oshii
21	2009	Summer Wars	Madhouse	Mamoru Hosoda
22	2010	Colorful	Ascension	Keiichi Hara
23	2011	Hotarubi no Mori e	Brain's Base	Takahiro Omori
24	2012	Wolf Children	Studio Chizu, Madhouse	Mamoru Hosoda
25	2013	The Tale of the Princess Kaguya	Studio Ghibli	Isao Takahata
26	2014	Giovanni's Island	Production I.G	Mizuho Nishikubo
27	2015	Miss Hokusai	Production I.G	Keiichi Hara
28	2016	Your Name	CoMix Wave Films	Makoto Shinkai
29	2017	Complex × Complex	Panpokopina	Miyuki Fukuda
30	2018	Okko's Inn	DLE, Madhouse	Kitaro Kosaka
31	2019	Children of the Sea	Studio 4°C	Ayumu Watanabe
32	2020	Looking for Magical Doremi	Toei Animation	Haruka Kamatani, Junichi Sato
33	2021	The House of the Lost on the Cape	David Production	Shin'ya Kawatsura
32	2022	Takano Intersection	(Independent production)	Mizuki Ito
33	2023	Maboroshi	MAPPA	Mari Okada

== See also ==
- List of animation awards
