= Space Pirate Mito =

Television series

- Space Pirate Mito DVD cover

宇宙海賊ミトの大冒険 (Uchū Kaizoku Mito no Daibōken)
- Anime television series
- Directed by: Takashi Watanabe
- Produced by: Yoshiyuki Itou; Ken Matsumoto
- Written by: Fumihiko Shimo (Note: Series Composition (シリーズ構成)); Hidefumi Kimura (Note: Story Concept (ストーリーコンセプト))
- Music by: Masumi Itō
- Studio: Triangle Staff
- Licensed by: NA: Media Blasters (expired) Nozomi Entertainment (current)
- Original network: TV Tokyo
- Original run: 4 January 1999 – 29 March 1999
- Episodes: 13
- Anime television series

A Pair of Queens
- Directed by: Takashi Watanabe
- Produced by: Yoshiyuki Itou; Nobuhiro Oosawa
- Written by: Fumihiko Shimo; Hidefumi Kimura
- Music by: Masumi Itō
- Studio: Triangle Staff
- Licensed by: NA: Media Blasters (expired) Nozomi Entertainment (current)
- Original network: TV Tokyo
- Original run: 5 July 1999 – 5 October 1999
- Episodes: 13

Space Pirate Mito (宇宙海賊ミトの大冒険 Uchū Kaizoku Mito no Daibōken), also known as Stellar Buster Mito in Japanese, is an anime series from 1999. It was produced in two seasons at 13 episodes each. Directed by Takashi Watanabe, the series was animated by Triangle Staff. Furthermore, there was a theatrical production of the series, during the year 2000.

The first series of the farcical sci-fi title mainly revolves around the small space pirate Mito and her fights with and flights from the galactic police force, as well as her relationship with her half-human Earthling son Aoi, initially largely ignorant of his mother's spacefaring life. The first series ends with Aoi, having become a girl due to a biological quirk of Mito's species, crowned queen of the galaxy as a result of Mito's campaigns, and the second (titled Mito's Great Adventure: The Two Queens (宇宙海賊ミトの大冒険 2人の女王様 Mito no Daibōken: Futari no Joō-sama)) focuses on her and the pirates, now court soldiers, facing the challenges that come with her new office. Both series have been released on DVD in the United States.

== Characters ==
Mito Mitsukuni (ミト / 光国美都 Mitsukuni Mito)

Voiced by: Tomoko Kawakami (Japanese); Lisa Ortiz (English)

Mito is the main protagonist of the series. She is an intergalactic pirate alien that comes to Earth to raise her half-human son. Although she is technically a full-grown adult of her species, she appears to be a young human girl, and so must use a special exosuit to disguise herself as a grown human woman.

Aoi Mitsukuni (光国葵 Mitsukuni Aoi)

Voiced by: Soichiro Hoshi (teen), Yuko Sasamoto (child) (Japanese); Brian Morey (eps. 1-10), Sam Riegel (eps. 11-13) (English)

Aoi is Mito's 15-year-old son. His life takes an unexpected turn when he discovers his mothers secret. Unlike his mother who is more bold, he is much more reserved. By the end of the first season, because of a certain quirk of his mothers species, he becomes a woman.

Mutsuki Nenga (年賀睦月 Nenga Mutsuki)

Voiced by: Tomoko Ishimura (Japanese); Veronica Taylor (English)

A young female member of the Galactic patrol and Masatsuki's older sister. She is fully busy trying to get hold of the space pirate Mito and her minions. Her mission is complicated by often forgetting to take her medicine against fungus that grows on her scalp.

Masatsuki Nenga (年賀正月 Nenga Masatsuki)

Voiced by: Yumiko Kobayashi (Japanese); Michelle Newman (English)

He is the younger brother of Mutsuki and participates in her interplanetary hunt for criminals. Masatsuki is constantly overestimating his ability to capture the Mito and her pirates. He seeks to capture them to regain the honor of his and Mutsuki's father, who was also part of the galactic patrol.

Ranban

Voiced by: Rumi Kasahara (Japanese); Lisa Ortiz (English)

The main antagonist of the first season and the ruler of the galactic empire. He resembles Darth Vader.

== Mito Kōmon references ==
A couple of "internal" jokes poke fun at the famous Japanese TV series Mito Kōmon. In episode two Mito, introduces Sabu and Shin with their complete names, Sukesaburō and Kakunoshin. These also happen to be the names of Mitsukuni's two devote followers (abbreviated as Suke-san – 助さん – and Kaku-san – 格さん – in the TV-series).

== Media ==
=== Japan ===
- 日本語タイトル: 宇宙海賊ミトの大冒険 1/ アニメ (Stellar Buster Mito), Bandai Visual. 1999-04-25–1999-11-25 (laserdisc, seven issues with 1–2 episodes per LD-box).
- 日本語タイトル: 宇宙海賊ミトの大冒険 2人の女王様 1/ アニメ (Stellar Buster Mito, Futari no joōsama), Bandai Visual 1999-12-18–2000-07-25 (laserdisc / DVD, seven issues with 1–2 episodes per LD/DVD-box).
- 日本語タイトル: EMOTION the Best 宇宙海賊ミトの大冒険 DVD-BOX [廉価版]/ アニメ (DVD), Bandai Visual 2010-07-23 (reissue of the whole first season in a box).
- 日本語タイトル: EMOTION the Best 宇宙海賊ミトの大冒険 2人の女王様 DVD-BOX [廉価版]/ アニメ, Bandai Visual 2010-07-23 (DVD, reissue with the whole second season in a box).
- 日本語タイトル: 宇宙海賊ミトよ永遠に/ 川上とも子、保志総一郎、他 <歌>aya、伊藤真澄、他 (Stellar Buster Mito yo Towa ni), Lantis 2000-09-06 (CD).
- 日本語タイトル: ステラバスター 宇宙海賊ミトの大冒険 オリジナル・サウンドトラック/ サウンドトラック (Stellar Buster Mito Original Soundtrack), Lantis 2000-10-25 (CD).
- 日本語タイトル: CDシネマ 宇宙海賊ミトの大冒険 「ざ・む〜び〜?」/ ドラマCD (CD Cinema Stellar Buster Mito), Tri-m 2000-10-25 (CD).
- 日本語タイトル: 宇宙海賊ミトの大冒険 2人の女王様/ サウンドトラック(aya、伊藤真澄、柊、美鈴) (Stellar Buster Mito 2 Queens), Tri-m 2001-01-24 (CD).

=== United States ===
- Space Pirate Mito – Call Me Mom! (DVD 1), Media Blasters 2002-10-29.
- Space Pirate Mito – Courting Disaster (DVD 2), Media Blasters 2003-03-25.
- Space Pirate Mito – Ranban Dearest (DVD 3), Media Blasters 2003-05-27.
- Space Pirate Mito – Like Mother, Like Son (DVD 4), Media Blasters 2003-07-29.
- Space Pirate Mito – First Season Collection (DVD), Media Blasters 2003-10-28.
- Aoi & Mutsuki: A Pair of Queens (DVD), Media Blasters 2007-07-31.
- Space Pirate Mito – Complete Anthology Best Buy Exclusive 6 Disc Release (DVD), Media Blasters 2008-11-11.
- Space Pirate Mito – Complete Collection (DVD), Lucky Penny 2014-11-04
