= Junkers Come Here =

- DVD cover
- Directed by: Junichi Sato
- Production companies: Bandai Visual, Triangle Staff
- Release date: July 20, 1995
- Running time: 100 minutes
- Country: Japan
- Language: Japanese

Junkers Come Here (ユンカース・カム・ヒア, Yunkāsu Kamu Hia) is a series of novels about Junkers (pronounced Yoon-kers), a Miniature Schnauzer, language-speaking dog, written by Japanese musician Naoto Kine as a member of TM Network since 1990. It was later adapted into an animated film.

== Media ==
=== Anime ===
An anime movie about a girl, Hiromi Nozawa, directed by Junichi Sato of Sailor Moon fame and shown in small segments on Japanese TV before being released theatrically. The original author, Kine also performed the film's opening song and acted in the film as Shintaro, Hiromi's father. The late Kazuo Komatsubara also worked on the film as a character designer and animation director. It won Best Animation Film at the 1995 Mainichi Film Awards.

Hiromi appears on the outside to be a mature, resilient girl, but on the inside she feels like she's falling apart. She hardly sees her parents at all, as they are always busy with work. Then she learns that her parents are considering a divorce and she may have to make the heartrending choice of deciding which parent to live with. On top of that, Hiromi's tutor, Keisuke (on whom Hiromi has a crush), is getting married, and Hiromi fears that she soon will be completely alone. She finds herself comforted by Junkers, an unusual dog with the ability to speak and grant her three wishes.

==== Cast ====
Japanese voice actor

- Mei Oshitani as Hiromi Nozawa
- Shinnosuke Furumoto as Junkers
- Daisuke Sugata as Atsushi
- Hiroko Takahashi as School Crossing Warden
- Kappei Yamaguchi as Passenger
- Katsunari Mineno as Keisuke Kimura Keisuke Kimura (木村圭介)
- Keiko Nakajima as Fumie Morita Fumie Morita (森田文江)
- Mayumi Iizuka as Kazuko
- Misako Konno as Suzuko Nozawa Suzuko Nozawa (野沢鈴子)
- Mitsuaki Madono as Waiter
- Momoko Ishi as Chie Harada
- Naoto Kine as Shintaro Nozawa Shintaro Nozawa (野沢新太郎)
- Sakiko Tamagawa as Yoko Inoue Yoko Inoue (井上洋子)
- Toshihiko Nakajima as Photographer
- Yuki Sato as Baby
- Yuta Yamazaki as Hiroshi
- Yuya Tejima as Takashi

English dubbing actor

- Brittney Wilson as Hiromi Nozawa
- Sanders Whiting as Junkers
- Brad Swaile as Keisuke Kimura
- Chantal Strand as Kazuko
- Danny McKinnon as Takashi
- Ellen Kennedy as Fumie Morita
- Farell Spence as School Crossing Warden
- Jordan Kilik as Atsushi
- Lisa Ann Beley as Suzuko Nozawa
- Moneca Stori as Yoko Inoue
- Reece Thompson as Hiroshi
- Sean Campbell as Shintaro Nozawa
- Sylvia Zaradic as Chie Hirada
- Trevor Devall as Photographer

==== Music ====
Opening Theme
Real You, Another You, by Naoto Kine
Ending Theme
Winter Comes Around, by Akiko Hioki
