= One Off (miniseries) =

Japanese animated miniseries

わんおふ -one off- (Wan Ofu)
- Genre: Slice of life
- Anime
- Directed by: Junichi Sato
- Written by: Masahi Suzuki
- Studio: TYO Animations
- Released: August 5, 2012 – October 7, 2012

One Off (わんおふ -one off-, Wan Ofu) is an animated series directed by Junichi Sato and produced by TYO Animations in collaboration with Honda. The four-episode series was aired on AT-X on August 5 and October 7, 2012. It was released in two volumes on DVD and Blu-ray on November 28 and December 21, 2012. The opening theme is "That Promised Place" (約束の場所, Yakusoku no Basho) whilst the ending theme is "Memories" (メモリーズ, Memorīzu), both performed by Round Table featuring Nino.

== Story ==
The story follows a young girl named Haruno Shiozaki and her friends who enjoy motorcycles and one day meet a curious motorcyclist named Cynthia.

== Characters ==
Haruno Shiozaki (汐崎 春乃, Shiozaki Haruno)
Voiced by: Saori Goto
The main character, a young girl who lives at the Niwa Café and motorcycle repair shop. She enjoys riding her Honda Giorno and has a habit of daydreaming. Having a rather pessimistic look on things, believing the impossible is impossible, she starts to change once she meets Cynthia.
Sayo Kaburagi (鏑木 小夜, Kaburagi Sayo)
Voiced by: Saori Hayami
Haruno's friend who rides a Honda Little Cub
Anri Bessho (別所 杏里, Bessho Anri)
Voiced by: Sayuri Yahagi
Haruno's friend who rides a Honda Benly. She likes to compose songs with her pet dog Maro and get Haruno to sing to them.
Rie Maezono (前園 利絵, Maezono Rie)
Voiced by: Eri Kitamura
Haruno's underclassman who simply rides a bicycle as she is not yet old enough for a moped license. She desires to drive a Honda Zoomer once she's old enough. She is quite fond of Cynthia.
Cynthia B. Rogers (シンシア・B・ロジャース, Shinshia Bī Rojāsu)
Voiced by: Yu Kobayashi
A lively motorcyclist from Australia who begins working at the Niwa Café. She has ridden across many countries on her Honda CBR250R.
Kageyama (影山)
Voiced by: Megumi Ogata
Another female motorcyclist who is friends with Cynthia.

== Episode list ==
No.	Title	Release dates
1+2	"A Breeze on the Café Terrace"; Transliteration: "Kaze no Kafe Terasu" (Japanese: 風のカフェテラス)	August 5, 2012 (TV); November 28, 2012 (BD/DVD)
1+2	"Haruno's Overture"; Transliteration: "Haruno Ōbāchua" (Japanese: はるのオーバーチュア)	August 5, 2012 (TV); November 28, 2012 (BD/DVD)
Haruno Shiozaki is a girl who lives at a mountainside café and likes to ride on mopeds with her friends. The café soon hires a new waitress in the form of a lively Australian motorcyclist named Cynthia B. Rogers. As Haruno had always been a bit close minded about what she can and can't do, she becomes somewhat jealous of Cynthia's free way of life. As Cynthia starts to influence her friends, Haruno remains defiant about her own limitations. Having been told by Haruno's friends about how she used to be more optimistic, Cynthia decides to take Haruno on a nighttime ride to the beach, where she reminds her to strive and push her limits. As they finally reach the beach, Cynthia assures Haruno that it is okay to rely on others.
3+4	"Poko-a-Poko"; Transliteration: "Poko a Poko" (Japanese: ぽこ・あ・ぽこ)	October 7, 2012 (TV); December 21, 2012 (BD/DVD)
3+4	"And the Start of Our Memories"; Transliteration: "Soshite Hajimaru Memorīzu" (Japanese: そして始まるメモリーズ)	October 7, 2012 (TV); December 21, 2012 (BD/DVD)
As the café sets up a stargazing event, Cynthia warms up to the idea of Haruno performing in a concert, but Haruno lacks confidence, even after suggesting it to her friends. After Haruno converses a little with one of the stargazers, who turns out to be one of Cynthia's friends, Kageyama, Haruno's friends decide they should try out having a mini concert at the café, naming their unit 'Poko a Poko'. Later, Haruno learns that Cynthia will be soon be leaving for Australia. As Haruno mopes, Kageyama gives her a little encouragement. Haruno and the others then practice hard for their concert and give Cynthia a farewell performance. As Cynthia prepares to take her leave, Haruno makes a promise that she will some day come to see her.
