= Shinkai Densetsu Meremanoid =

Japanese anime television series by Kitty Films

深海伝説マーメノイド (Shinkai Densetsu Meremanoid)
- Genre: Fantasy
- Anime television series
- Directed by: Shigeru Morikawa
- Written by: Kenji Terada; Yasushi Hirano; Nobuaki Kishima
- Music by: Tatsuya Murayama; Saku Yoshizawa; Tosh Masuda; Soichiro Nakamura
- Studio: Triangle Staff
- Original network: TV Asahi
- Original run: October 9, 1997 – April 2, 1998
- Episodes: 24
- Video game

Meremanoid
- Developer: Shout! Designworks
- Publisher: Xing
- Genre: Role playing game
- Platform: PlayStation
- Released: August 5, 1999

Shinkai Densetsu Meremanoid (深海伝説MEREMANOID, lit. Legend of the Deep Sea Meremanoid; a.k.a. Meremanoid) is an original Japanese anime television series that was produced by Kitty Films and was animated by Triangle Staff and aired from October 9, 1997 to April 2, 1998 on TV Asahi. The series later spawned a PlayStation video game, released on August 5, 1999 by Xing Entertainment. The game is a fantasy role-playing game where the player takes the role of a mermaid named Arden trying to find the secrets of her race as well facing antagonists Destroyer. The game uses a turn-based fighting system with special moves and attacks. The blocky graphics were typical for a PlayStation title of the era.
