= Colorful (manga) =

Japanese manga series

- First tankōbon volume cover
- Genre: Sex comedy
- Manga
- Written by: Torajirō Kishi
- Published by: Shueisha
- Magazine: Weekly Young Jump
- Original run: 1997 – 2000
- Volumes: 7
- Anime television series
- Directed by: Ryutaro Nakamura
- Written by: Kazuharu Sato
- Music by: Moka
- Studio: Triangle Staff
- Licensed by: NA: AEsir Holdings
- Original network: TBS
- English network: NA: Anime Network; US: G4 (Anime Unleashed)
- Original run: September 6, 1999 – September 30, 1999
- Episodes: 16
- icon

Colorful is a Japanese manga series written and illustrated by Torajirō Kishi. It was serialized in Shueisha's seinen manga magazine Weekly Young Jump from 1997 to 2000, with its chapters collected in seven tankōbon volumes. The manga was adapted into a 16-episode anime television series by Triangle Staff in 1999. The episodes are composed of vignettes typically involving men and teenage boys attempting to catch a glimpse of women's panties and/or look down their blouses. The episodes are fast-paced and short, about seven minutes each. In North America, the anime series was licensed by ADV Films.

== Characters ==
Hirokawa (広川) and Itani (猪谷)
Voiced by: Nobutoshi Hayashi (Japanese); David Matranga (English) (Hirokawa)
Voiced by: Yasuhiko Kawazu (Japanese); Tommy Drake (English) (Itani)
Two freshmen at the University of Tokyo. They are perverts in their own way. Hirokawa and Itani are seen enjoying the wind blowing girls' skirts up and seeing their attractive English teacher showing them how to pronounce their L's and R's. Hirokawa shares an apartment with three people.
Aki Yamamoto (山本, Yamamoto Aki)
Voiced by: Sayaka Ohara (Japanese); Hilary Haag (English)
An athletic star. The show features clips of Yamamoto's face in between vignettes, either winking or with her name being printed all over the screen with "Yamamoto!" being said by multiple people in different ways.
Steve (スティーブ, Sutību)
Voiced by: Yūichi Nagashima (Japanese); Greg Stanley (English)
An American exchange student majoring in photography and cinematography at the University of Tokyo. He uses his cameras for voyeuristic panty shots.
Kariya (刈谷)
Voiced by: Daiki Nakamura
A man with circular sun-glasses who usually steals things from unsuspecting people.
Shimoi Chino
Voiced by: Nina Kumagaya (Japanese); Shelley Calene-Black (English)
Reporter for the TV show Psychic Spot (Channel 2 Night Beat in the dubbed version) whose main goal is to sit beside Barbara Walters on The View.

== Media ==
=== Manga ===
Written and illustrated by Torajirō Kishi, Colorful was serialized in Shueisha's seinen manga magazine Weekly Young Jump from 1997 to 2000. Shueisha collected its chapters in seven tankōbon volumes, released from February 20, 1998, to December 15, 2000.

=== Anime ===
Colorful was adapted into a 16-episode anime television series by Triangle Staff, broadcast on TBS's Wonderful programming block from September 6–30, 1999. The opening theme is "Boku no Taion wa 37.5 C." (僕の体温は37.5°C; "My temperature is 37.5 degrees"), performed by Yūko Miyamura.

In North America, the series was licensed in English by ADV Films. They released the 16-episode in DVD on March 18, 2003. It was later broadcast in the United States on G4's Anime Unleashed anime block in 2005 . The series was launched in Australia and New Zealand by Madman Entertainment on July 12, 2005.
