= Atsugiri Jason =

American comedian (born 1986)

- 厚切りジェイソン
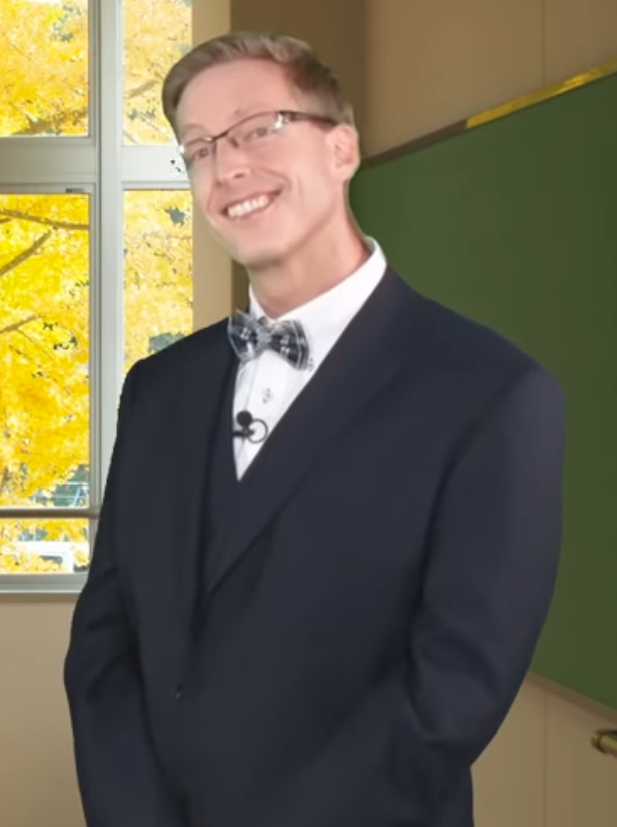
- Danielson in 2021
- Born: Jason David Danielson; April 9, 1986 (age 40); Michigan, United States
- Education: University of Illinois at Urbana–Champaign
- Occupation: Comedian
- Years active: 2014–present
- Agent: Watanabe Entertainment
- Children: 3
- Website: www.watanabepro.co.jp/mypage/40000169/

Jason David Danielson (born April 9, 1986), known professionally as Atsugiri Jason (厚切りジェイソン, Atsugiri Jeison; lit. 'Thick-sliced Jason'), is an American comedian based in Japan and associated with Watanabe Entertainment. Danielson's comedic narrative is based on his confusion with kanji, ending with the punchline, "Why Japanese people?!"

== Early and personal life ==
Danielson was born in Michigan, United States. He attended the University of Illinois at Urbana–Champaign as an engineering major and traveled to Japan for a one-year internship in 2005 to develop English speech recognition software. He earned a bachelor's degree and master's degree in computer science. In 2011, Danielson returned to Japan and formed the Japanese branch of an IT company he worked for in Chicago. Along with his career in entertainment, Danielson continues to work full-time at the IT company.

In 2007, Danielson married a Japanese woman, who he met when he first went to Japan in 2005, with their wedding ceremony held in the United States. They have three daughters: Lisa (リサ), who was born in 2011 or 2012 (age 14–15); Ailee (アイリ), who was born in 2014 (age 11–12); and Michelle (ミシェル), who was born on January 1, 2017 (age 9).

== Career ==
While in Japan in 2005, Danielson became interested in Japanese comedy after watching The God of Entertainment. Two years after he returned to Japan, he attended a show held by the Japanese comedy duo Xabungle, where he became acquainted with Ayumu Kato and was introduced to his agency, Watanabe Entertainment. He then trained at the agency's program, Watanabe Comedy School. Danielson's comedy routines based on his confusion with kanji, which he writes on a board behind him and ends with him yelling, "Why Japanese people?!" in English. He initially considered focusing on political criticism like American comedians but did not feel that it would be accepted by a Japanese audience. Danielson's stage name, Atsugiri, meaning 'thick-sliced' in Japanese, originated from Atsugi, where he was living at the time, and because his chest is thick.

After only four months of training, in October 2014, he made his first television appearance on R-1 Grand Prix 2015, where he attracted media attention for being the first non-Japanese finalist competing in the history of the show. Shortly after the show ended, Danielson appeared in a web-exclusive video featured as part of the advertising campaign of Nissin Foods' yakisoba UFO.

On November 8, 2015, Danielson released his first book, Nihon no Mina-san ni Otsutaeshitai 48 no Why. In February 2016, Danielson was announced as a host of the educational program Why? Programming, which was broadcast on NHK from March 21 to 25, 2016. On December 14, 2016, Danielson released his second book, Jason Shiki Eigo Training: Oboenai Eiei Tango 400. For the book's promotional event, he led an English class for 200 people, during which he stated that he was retiring his "Why Japanese people?!" catch phrase.

== Filmography ==
=== Film ===
| Year | Title | Role | Notes | Ref(s) |
|---|---|---|---|---|
| 2020 | Looking for Magical Doremi | Ezekiel | Voice | |
| 2023 | Yudo: The Way of the Bath | Adrian | | |

=== Television ===
| Year | Title | Role | Network | Notes | Ref(s) |
|---|---|---|---|---|---|
| 2014 | R-1 Grand Prix 2015 | Himself | Fuji TV | Finalist | |
| 2015 | Death Note (2015 Drama) | Jason Walterson | NTV (Japan) | Guest | |
| 2016 | Why!? Programming | Himself | NHK | Host | |
| 2018 | "Bushimeshi!: The Samurai Cook 2" | Anthony Abbott | NHK | | |
| 2017 | Eigo de Asobo with Orton | Professor Jason | NHK | | |
| 2020 | Ii ne! Hikaru Genji-kun | Phillip | NHK | Episode 4 | |
| 2022 | Japan's Top Inventions | Himself | NHK | Season 1 | |

== Publications ==
| Year | Title | Publisher | ISBN |
|---|---|---|---|
| 2015 | Nihon no Mina-san ni Otsutaeshitai 48 no Why (日本のみなさんにお伝えしたい48のWhy) | Pia | ISBN 978-4-8356-2850-9 |
| 2016 | Jason Shiki Eigo Training: Oboenai Eiei Tango 400 (ジェイソン式英語トレーニング 覚えない英英単語400) | Shufu to Seikatsu-sha | ISBN 978-4-3911-4953-1 |
