= Masayuki Suzuki (disambiguation) =

Masayuki Suzuki may refer to:

== Musicians ==
- Masayuki Suzuki, singer
- Masayuki Suzuki (drummer)

== Film and TV ==
- Masayuki Suzuki (director), stage director of Beautiful Life (Japanese TV series)
- Masayuki Suzuki (actor) from The Space Sheriff Spirits
- Masayuki Suzuki (film director) for Hero (2015 Japanese film)
- Great Gidayū, stage name of Masayuki Suzuki
