= Yume no Crayon Oukoku =

Television anime

- Promotional image from the anime series, displaying Princess Silver and her friends
- 夢のクレヨン王国
- Based on: Crayon Kingdom by Reizo Fukunaga
- Developed by: Takashi Yamada
- Directed by: Junichi Sato
- Music by: Takanori Arisawa
- No. of episodes: 70

Production
- Producers: Tetsu Kotake (ABC); Shinji Kabuyanagi (ABC); Takashi Horiuchi (Asatsu/Asatsu-DK); Hiromi Seki; Seiichi Hiruta
- Production companies: ABC; Asatsu-DK (Note: Previously credited as Asatsu until episode 65); Toei Animation

Original release
- Network: ANN (ABC, TV Asahi)
- Release: September 7, 1997 – January 31, 1999

Related
- Manga
- Written by: Michiru Kataoka
- Published by: Kodansha
- Magazine: Nakayoshi
- Original run: August 1997 – August 1998
- Volumes: 3

Yume no Crayon Oukoku (夢のクレヨン王国, Yume no Kureyon Ōkoku; lit. The Crayon Kingdom of Dreams) is a Japanese seventy-episode anime television series created by Toei Animation and broadcast from 1997 to 1999. It was based on the novel series by Reizo Fukunaga, and was adapted into a manga by Michiru Kataoka and serialized in Nakayoshi from August 1997 to August 1998. It has been dubbed into French, Italian, Russian, Korean and Chinese.

== Plot ==
The civilians of the Crayon Kingdom had always viewed their Princess Silver as a twelve-year-old girl with a beautiful smile. However, unknown to them, the princess has twelve bad habits. This causes much distress to the Chameleon Prime Minister and the Crayon ministers, for it would be embarrassing if this gets out.

One day, a party is held to celebrate Silver's twelfth birthday. The princess is so busy trying to find a suitable dance partner that she forgets to hide her bad habits. The boy she thinks suitable to dance with refuses to dance and, after a short quarrel, he changes Silver's parents, the King and Queen, into stone.

Along with a pig named Stonston and a rooster named Araessa, Silver learns that only the Grim Reaper is capable of casting a spell like that, and she assumes that the boy was actually him in disguise. So begins their quest to find the boy Reaper. They do not realize that the boy and the Grim Reaper are two different people entirely. The Grim Reaper is trying to kill Silver, whose ancestor trapped him in a mirror for several thousand years. The boy is trying to save her, and her parents, whom he transformed into stone to prevent them from being killed.

They finally realize this when the boy saves them from the Grim Reaper. He says he is Prince Cloud, and that he will help them destroy the Grim Reaper and Silver develops a crush on him. However, he constantly annoys her. They eventually find out that in order to destroy the Grim Reaper, Princess Silver must get rid of her 12 bad habits.

They eventually succeed, by reassembling the broken pieces of a mirror and deciphering the hidden code. They finally realize that they have to "tickle the Grim Reaper under the left arm" to destroy him and send him back into the mirror. They then cut off a lock of his hair and sprinkle it over The King and Queen, which brings them back to life.

However, Silver's new maid Punya, a cat, gets tricked into liberating two mischievous angels. Princess Silver and her friends set off on yet another journey to bring them back. Prince Cloud does reappear to help them, but not often. Once this has been done, Silver, Cloud, Punya, Araessa, and Stonston set off on a journey around the kingdom.

== Episodes ==
No.	Title	Original release date
1	"The Princess sets out on her Journey"; Transliteration: "oujo tabitatsu" (Japanese: 王女旅立つ)	September 7, 1997
2	"September's Journey I"; Transliteration: "kugatsu no tabi I" (Japanese: 9月の旅I)	September 14, 1997
3	"September's Journey II"; Transliteration: "kugatsu no tabi II" (Japanese: 9月の旅II)	September 21, 1997
4	"September's Journey III"; Transliteration: "kugatsu no tabi III" (Japanese: 9月の旅III)	September 28, 1997
5	"October's Journey I"; Transliteration: "juugatsu no tabi I" (Japanese: 10月の旅I)	October 5, 1997
6	"October's Journey II"; Transliteration: "juugatsu no tabi II" (Japanese: 10月の旅II)	October 12, 1997
7	"October's Journey III"; Transliteration: "juugatsu no tabi III" (Japanese: 10月の旅III)	October 19, 1997
8	"October's Journey IV"; Transliteration: "juugatsu no tabi IV" (Japanese: 10月の旅IV)	October 26, 1997
9	"November's Journey I"; Transliteration: "juuichigatsu no tabi I" (Japanese: 11月の旅I)	November 16, 1997
10	"November's Journey II"; Transliteration: "juuichigatsu no tabi II" (Japanese: 11月の旅II)	November 23, 1997
11	"November's Journey III"; Transliteration: "juuichigatsu no tabi III" (Japanese: 11月の旅III)	November 30, 1997
12	"November's Journey IV"; Transliteration: "juuichigatsu no tabi IV" (Japanese: 11月の旅IV)	December 7, 1997
13	"December's Journey I"; Transliteration: "juuningatsu no tabi I" (Japanese: 12月の旅I)	December 14, 1997
14	"December's Journey II"; Transliteration: "juuningatsu no tabi II" (Japanese: 12月の旅II)	December 21, 1997
15	"December's Journey III"; Transliteration: "juuningatsu no tabi III" (Japanese: 12月の旅III)	December 28, 1997
16	"N-Paka's Journey"; Transliteration: "n-paka no tabi" (Japanese: ン・パカの旅)	January 4, 1998
17	"January's Journey I"; Transliteration: "ichigatsu no tabi I" (Japanese: 1月の旅I)	January 11, 1998
18	"January's Journey II"; Transliteration: "ichigatsu no tabi II" (Japanese: 1月の旅II)	January 18, 1998
19	"January's Journey III"; Transliteration: "ichigatsu no tabi III" (Japanese: 1月の旅III)	January 25, 1998
20	"February's Journey I"; Transliteration: "ningatsu no tabi I" (Japanese: 2月の旅I)	February 1, 1998
21	"February's Journey II"; Transliteration: "ningatsu no tabi II" (Japanese: 2月の旅II)	February 8, 1998
22	"February's Journey III"; Transliteration: "ningatsu no tabi III" (Japanese: 2月の旅III)	February 15, 1998
23	"February's Journey IV"; Transliteration: "ningatsu no tabi IV" (Japanese: 2月の旅IV)	February 22, 1998
24	"March's Journey I"; Transliteration: "sangatsu no tabi I" (Japanese: 3月の旅I)	March 1, 1998
25	"March's Journey II"; Transliteration: "sangatsu no tabi II" (Japanese: 3月の旅II)	March 8, 1998
26	"March's Journey III"; Transliteration: "sangatsu no tabi III" (Japanese: 3月の旅III)	March 15, 1998
27	"March's Journey IV"; Transliteration: "sangatsu no tabi IV" (Japanese: 3月の旅IV)	March 22, 1998
28	"March's Journey V"; Transliteration: "sangatsu no tabi V" (Japanese: 3月の旅V)	March 29, 1998
29	"April's Journey I"; Transliteration: "yongatsu no tabi I" (Japanese: 4月の旅I)	April 5, 1998
30	"April's Journey II"; Transliteration: "yongatsu no tabi II" (Japanese: 4月の旅II)	April 12, 1998
31	"April's Journey III"; Transliteration: "yongatsu no tabi III" (Japanese: 4月の旅III)	April 19, 1998
32	"April's Journey IV"; Transliteration: "yongatsu no tabi IV" (Japanese: 4月の旅IV)	April 26, 1998
33	"May's Journey I"; Transliteration: "gogatsu no tabi I" (Japanese: 5月の旅I)	May 3, 1998
34	"May's Journey II"; Transliteration: "gogatsu no tabi II" (Japanese: 5月の旅II)	May 10, 1998
35	"May's Journey III"; Transliteration: "gogatsu no tabi III" (Japanese: 5月の旅III)	May 17, 1998
36	"May's Journey IV"; Transliteration: "gogatsu no tabi IV" (Japanese: 5月の旅IV)	May 24, 1998
37	"May's Journey V"; Transliteration: "gogatsu no tabi V" (Japanese: 5月の旅V)	May 31, 1998
38	"June's Journey I"; Transliteration: "rokugatsu no tabi I" (Japanese: 6月の旅I)	June 7, 1998
39	"June's Journey II"; Transliteration: "rokugatsu no tabi II" (Japanese: 6月の旅II)	June 14, 1998
40	"June's Journey III"; Transliteration: "rokugatsu no tabi III" (Japanese: 6月の旅III)	June 28, 1998
41	"June's Journey IV"; Transliteration: "rokugatsu no tabi IV" (Japanese: 6月の旅IV)	July 5, 1998
42	"July's Journey I"; Transliteration: "shichigatsu no tabi I" (Japanese: 7月の旅I)	July 12, 1998
43	"July's Journey II"; Transliteration: "shichigatsu no tabi II" (Japanese: 7月の旅II)	July 19, 1998
44	"July's Journey III"; Transliteration: "shichigatsu no tabi III" (Japanese: 7月の旅III)	July 26, 1998
45	"July's Journey IV"; Transliteration: "shichigatsu no tabi IV" (Japanese: 7月の旅IV)	August 2, 1998
46	"August's Journey I"; Transliteration: "bachigatsu no tabi I" (Japanese: 8月の旅I)	August 9, 1998
47	"August's Journey II"; Transliteration: "bachigatsu no tabi II" (Japanese: 8月の旅II)	August 16, 1998
48	"August's Journey III"; Transliteration: "bachigatsu no tabi III" (Japanese: 8月の旅III)	August 23, 1998
49	"August's Journey IV"; Transliteration: "bachigatsu no tabi IV" (Japanese: 8月の旅IV)	August 30, 1998
50	"Seems like a Princess"; Transliteration: "oujo rashiku" (Japanese: 王女らしく)	September 6, 1998
51	"The 13th Month's Journey I"; Transliteration: "juusangatsu no tabi I" (Japanese: 13月の旅I)	September 13, 1998
52	"The 13th Month's Journey II"; Transliteration: "juusangatsu no tabi II" (Japanese: 13月の旅II)	September 20, 1998
53	"The 13th Month's Journey III"; Transliteration: "juusangatsu no tabi III" (Japanese: 13月の旅III)	September 27, 1998
54	"The 14th Month's Journey I"; Transliteration: "juuyongatsu no tabi I" (Japanese: 14月の旅I)	October 4, 1998
55	"The 14th Month's Journey II"; Transliteration: "juuyongatsu no tabi II" (Japanese: 14月の旅II)	October 11, 1998
56	"The 14th Month's Journey III"; Transliteration: "juuyongatsu no tabi III" (Japanese: 14月の旅III)	October 18, 1998
57	"The 14th Month's Journey IV"; Transliteration: "juuyongatsu no tabi IV" (Japanese: 14月の旅IV)	October 25, 1998
58	"The 15th Month's Journey I"; Transliteration: "juugogatsu no tabi I" (Japanese: 15月の旅I)	November 8, 1998
59	"The 15th Month's Journey II"; Transliteration: "juugogatsu no tabi II" (Japanese: 15月の旅II)	November 15, 1998
60	"The 15th Month's Journey III"; Transliteration: "juugogatsu no tabi III" (Japanese: 15月の旅III)	November 22, 1998
61	"The 15th Month's Journey IV"; Transliteration: "juugogatsu no tabi IV" (Japanese: 15月の旅IV)	November 29, 1998
62	"The 16th Month's Journey I"; Transliteration: "juurokugatsu no tabi I" (Japanese: 16月の旅I)	December 6, 1998
63	"The 16th Month's Journey II"; Transliteration: "juurokugatsu no tabi II" (Japanese: 16月の旅II)	December 13, 1998
64	"The 16th Month's Journey III"; Transliteration: "juurokugatsu no tabi III" (Japanese: 16月の旅III)	December 20, 1998
65	"The 16th Month's Journey IV"; Transliteration: "juurokugatsu no tabi IV" (Japanese: 16月の旅IV)	December 27, 1998
66	"The 17th Month's Journey I"; Transliteration: "juushichigatsu no tabi I" (Japanese: 17月の旅I)	January 3, 1999
67	"The 17th Month's Journey II"; Transliteration: "juushichigatsu no tabi II" (Japanese: 17月の旅II)	January 10, 1999
68	"The 17th Month's Journey III"; Transliteration: "juushichigatsu no tabi III" (Japanese: 17月の旅III)	January 17, 1999
69	"The 17th Month's Journey IV"; Transliteration: "juushichigatsu no tabi IV" (Japanese: 17月の旅IV)	January 24, 1999
70	"Thank You"; Transliteration: "arigato" (Japanese: ありがと〜)	January 31, 1999

== Manga ==
There are total of three manga volumes from January 1998 to the end of 1998. Below is the name of the manga and ISBN.

1. 「夢のクレヨン王国（1）」 1998年1月、ISBN 4-06-178880-9
2. 「夢のクレヨン王国（2）」 1998年6月、ISBN 4-06-178889-2
3. 「夢のクレヨン王国（3）」 1998年12月、ISBN 4-06-178905-8
