= List of Skip Beat! episodes =

Skip Beat! is an anime series adapted from the manga series of the same name written by Yoshiki Nakamura. Produced by Hal Film Maker, and directed by Kiyoko Sayama, the series would span one season. The first season, comprising twenty five episodes, premiered on TV Tokyo in Japan on October 5, 2008, and ended at March 29, 2009. The story follows Kyoko Mogami who, after coming to Tokyo with her childhood friend and up-and-coming idol Sho Fuwa, discovers that he was merely using her as a maid. She declares that she will exact revenge by entering showbiz and become more famous than he was.

Four pieces of theme music were used: two opening themes and two ending themes. The first opening theme is "Dream Star" performed by the generous, and the first closing theme is "Namida" performed by the hip-hop group 2BACKKA. The second opening theme starting from episode 20 is "Renaissance", also performed by the generous, and the second ending theme is "Eien" performed by Yusaku Kiyama.

== Episode list ==
No.	Episode title	Original release date
STAGE.01	"And the Box Was Opened"; Transliteration: "Soshite Hako wa Akerareta" (Japanese: そして箱は開けられた)	October 5, 2008
Kyoko followed her first love and childhood friend Fuwa Shotarou to Tokyo. This is so she could help him reach his dream of becoming an idol. She cleans, cooks, works three jobs and does nothing for herself, though she gets nothing in return, because she loves him so much. She remains devotedly by his side until one day she goes unannounced to his agency with a delivery and overhears him talking about her. Sho reveals to his manager that he only took her with him as a maid, and that he doesn't care for her at all. Upon hearing this, Kyoko flies into a violent rage of food-throwing and tear-shedding. She is apprehended by security personnel but accepts a mocking Sho's challenge to join showbiz in order to take revenge.
STAGE.02	"Feast of Horror"; Transliteration: "Senritsu no Utage" (Japanese: 戦慄の)	October 12, 2008
Kyoko, now living at the Darumaya, a restaurant she works in, starts looking for an entrance into show business. She chooses L.M.E., Sho's agency's main competitor. Sawara, who manages talent at the company, kicks her out after hearing that she had no interest whatsoever in show business and thinks she is just another crazy fan trying to get closer to their top star, Ren Tsuruga. Kyoko pesters him for several days and nights until he finally gives in. Kyoko is then allowed to participate in an audition to get into the company. Soon after, she bumps into the famous actor Ren Tsuruga, L.M.E's most popular actor. After Tsuraga hears that Kyoko's main motive is revenge, he tells her it's useless to join L.M.E. Kyoko does not take this well. Ren momentarily shows a part of his real self in his anger, but immediately turns back to his smiling face. Kyoko angrily decides that Ren is the 2nd person she hates most after Sho. At the audition a notable character is entry number 46, who shocked all of the judges by memorizing a book in a short amount of time during the first stage of the audition. For her talent, Kyoko surprises everyone by coming on to the stage with a daikon, a white radish, and a knife.
STAGE.03	"The Emotion She Lacks"; Transliteration: "Kaketeru Kimochi" (Japanese: 欠けてる気持ち)	October 19, 2008
Kyoko's performance was to cut the daikon into a rose, using a knife lent by her boss at Darumaya. Her performance amazes the judges including the president, Lory, since the skill is famous and difficult to master. Though the daikon turns out to be a peony, lettuce, rather than a rose, Kyoko easily passes. As she continues to the next audition, entry number 46, known as Kotonami Kanae later on, approaches her. She taunts her, warning Kyoko that the test they were about to take was the true beginning of the audition. The test required participants to react to a phone call and participants started to act out happiness. Entry number 46 actually even manages to shed tears. When it came to Kyoko, however, she reacted with what the judges describe as a 'strong murderous aura', as the voice of the phone reminded her of how Sho dumped her. The phone is thrown angrily onto the ground, causing it to break, and the president seems about to cry at the sight. Later, Sawara reveals that she didn't pass that level because she was missing the important emotion of love. Kyoko returns to Darumaya, thinking about the path she was going to take, and her childhood. She decides to give up on competing with Sho, but her boss at Darumaya expresses strong dissent at this. The president of L.M.E. also mentions Kyoko to Sawara, and the plans he could have for her if she were the next talent.
STAGE.04	"The Labyrinth of Reunion"; Transliteration: "Saikai no Rabirinsu" (Japanese: 再会の迷宮)	October 26, 2008
Kyoko is working at a gas station, thinking about what Ren and her boss said to her. During her break, an advertisement of Sho appears on the television screen, causing her to have a violent breakdown, misinterpreted by her co-worker as a strong fan reaction. When Sho comes to pump gas at the station, her co-worker points her out when Kyoko had intended to escape. Their eyes meet, but Sho does not recognize her, which upsets Kyoko greatly. On the way back, Sho thinks that the unknown girl resembles Kyoko's ability to flatter him, but dismisses her as another fan with short dyed hair. Kyoko goes home that day thinking about her constant dead-ends to show business, but her boss at Darumya encourages her, and Kyoko tries to get herself into L.M.E. again. She accidentally bumps into Kamio, a famous actress, resulting in Kyoko carrying her luggage. Later, while carrying Kamio's bags, Ren offers his help and starts explaining about the new section that would be created in L.M.E., the 'Love-Me' section. This section is a group of people who have star potential but lack the X-factor, love. In the end, when Ren announces that Kyoko would be the first trainee, Kyoko is dumbfounded and drops Kamio's bags. Kamio gets angry with her, especially after seeing that Ren was helping her with the bags. In the end, Kyoko gets a penalty stamp, and Kyoko is absolutely furious with Ren for tricking her, stating that "He must hate me".
STAGE.05	"The Danger Zone"; Transliteration: "Kiken Chitai" (Japanese: 危険地帯)	November 2, 2008
Kyoko speaks with the President who asks if she believes she can love others. She says no, but insists that even though she can't feel love now, she wants to be able to gain back that important "human trait" that she lost. He agrees to let her in and gives her stamps and a notebook, saying if she does a good job she will get points, which will get her closer to her debut. Kyoko leaves the president pondering why she lost the ability to love, and finds a pink jumpsuit with the 'Love-Me' logo on the front and back, which was her new working attire. The manager of the singing section comes and tells Sawara and Kyoko that he had heard about the 'Love-Me' section and has her first job. All the contestants eliminated in the recent audition vented their anger by spitting out their chewing gum on the ground, so Kyoko must clean it. Due to her anger, she cleans up the gum and waxes the entire area. She just finishes when L.M.E. workers come and slip on the floor because it is too waxy. Sawara gives her 10 points saying she needs to try harder. She sits on the stairs sulking when someone knees her in the head. It turns out to be Ruriko, a L.M.E. idol who decides she has a job for Kyoko. Ruriko hires Kyoko to protect her while they are driving in the car up to an acting job. The car breaks down and Kyoko and Ruriko must walk. After five minutes Ruriko states that she can't walk anymore so Kyoko starts to carry her up the mountain. Kyoko then falls and sprains her ankle and Ruriko walks the last few feet on her own. She gets to the shooting location, but forgets to get someone to help Kyoko. Kyoko is left lying there in the middle of the road, not being able to move when Ren, finds her. He presses on Kyoko's sprained ankle and finds that it was badly injured. He scoops her up and walks to the set.
STAGE.06	"Invitation to the Ball"; Transliteration: "Butōkai e no Shōtaijō" (Japanese: 舞踏会への招待状)	November 9, 2008
After the shock of being picked up, Kyoko tries to struggle but then has no choice due to her injured ankle. Ren places her on the house because she kept on complaining, and his manager helped bandage Kyoko's ankle and asked if Ren always treated her this way. While answering, she felt an evil presence, which turns out to be Ruriko who had just witnessed Ren carrying Kyoko "like a princess" and was extremely jealous. Ruriko throws tantrums and after being infuriated by the coolness of Ren towards her and the lack of approval by the director for her portrayal of a "lady", she declares that she quits, saying that if he wanted a hard working amateur, he might as well pick Kyoko, who would do anything for points. Instead of being pleaded to stay like by all her previous directors, this one took up her 'suggestion' after Kyoko, enraged by Ruriko's attitude, agrees to the idea. Kyoko quickly proves herself a perfect lady after her training in Sho's family business, and impresses everyone on set. However the next scene requires her to kneel for the tea ceremony, which will inflict more pain on her injured ankle.
STAGE.07	"Princess Revolution"; Transliteration: "Purinsesu Kakumei" (Japanese: プリンセス革命)	November 16, 2008
Kyoko films with Ren and becomes startled and angry with the way he easily manipulates their acting. Ruriko is unhappy with the praise Kyoko's acting generates. Despite the injury to her ankle, and helped by her smooth movements during the tea ceremony, Kyoko is performing well. However, during filming, Kyoko faints from the strain. This causes Ruriko to reflect on her own attitude towards her work. Kyoko receives full points from Ruriko as thanks for showing a strong work ethic. Ren states later that the director had no intention of allowing Kyoko to act, but rather used her to improve Ruriko's attitude. As a sort of compensation, he arranges for Kyoko to have a photoshoot. After the shoot, the director speaks with Kyoko, thanking her. Kyoko, still oblivious to her true role during the competition with Ruriko, tells him that she is glad Ruriko got the part as her own acting with Ren was not satisfactory. Ren and Yashiro pass by and the director asks them to take her back to her room. Yashiro makes a comment that upsets Kyoko to the point where she sinks to the floor in a state of depression. Thinking her faltering is injury related, Ren helps her stand. The next day, Kyoko explains to Ren that her state had been the result of thinking about Sho, and Ren docks her ten points.
STAGE.08	"Sink or Swim Together"; Transliteration: "Ichirentakushou" (Japanese: 一蓮托生)	November 23, 2008
Kotonami Kanae (Moko), from Kyoko's audition into L.M.E., is discovered by Kyoko at L.M.E. headquarters. Even as she denies being eliminated from the audition, one of the judges from the audition appears and reveals she has become a member of the 'Love-Me' section. Kyoko became overjoyed and quickly binds Moko with her 'demons', in order to prevent her from running away. Meanwhile, the President asks for Kyoko's help with his granddaughter Maria, as her latest prank caused injuries. Maria's actions seems to stem from a current play he's staging.
STAGE.09	"The Miraculous Language of Angels"; Transliteration: "Tenshi no Kotodama" (Japanese: 天使の言霊)	November 30, 2008
Kyoko takes on the challenge given by the hot-shots in the training class. She uses a similar dialogue as the script but in a malevolent emotion, and later switches lines with the other actress. Maria recollected about her mother's death and how everyone tried to convince that it was not her fault. She had grown tired of hearing all of these, and started to distrust adults. After witnessing Kyoko and the other actress' argument, Maria takes the latter's place and thus realizes that what the other adults said was true. In the end, Kyoko and Moko still have to pay the fees due to Maria interrupting halfway.
STAGE.10	"The Blue in her Palm"; Transliteration: "Te no Hira no BLUE" (Japanese: てのひらのブルー)	December 7, 2008
Kyoko reminds Maria about her father's letter and Maria asks Kyoko for her opinion on what to talk about with her father. Maria realizes that Kyoko's father and mother had left her. Kyoko is told by the president that she needs her mother's permission to debut. Kyoko sits on the stairs mumbling to her blue corn stone that she is going to be okay. She then accidentally dropped the precious stone and quickly ran down to get it. The stone was picked up by Ren, who realized he knew Kyoko when he was young since he was the one who gave the stone to Kyoko when she was upset. Getting to play Bo the chicken mascot at a new talk show, Kyoko gets a chance to exact some revenge when the guest is none other than Sho.
STAGE.11	"The True Face of the Storm"; Transliteration: "Arashi no Sugao" (Japanese: 嵐の素顔)	December 14, 2008
Kyoko exposes another rumor about Sho's past life. Then, as Bo, she challenges Sho to a badminton match and almost reveals her identity to him. When she gets lost in the building, she meets up with Ren. A series of whack-up moments between Ren and Bo uncover some of Ren's real personality and his true feelings towards Kyoko. As Ren goes back to memorize his script, Kyoko begins pondering if she would become friends with him.
STAGE.12	"Her Open Wound"; Transliteration: "Hiraita Kizuguchi" (Japanese: 開いた傷口)	December 21, 2008
The episode starts after Kyoko's job has finished. She sees Ren and remembers what she did at her previous meeting with him (Kyoko gave him a bad gesture). She also recalls the side of Ren she experienced when dressed up as Bo, and blushes. She doesn't notice Ren staring at her from far away, and when, unexpectedly, Ren gives her a very radiant gentlemanly smile, she tries to run. Because of Ren's long legs he catches up to her by just walking gracefully. Kyoko panics and heads for the girls' bathroom, which is the only place Ren won't find her, but arriving at the door she sees that Ren has caught up to her and asks why she didn't greet him. Kyoko cries and apologises which makes Ren laugh, the manager sees it and is surprised. Later on, Ren gives Kyoko a ride back home and even gives her advice for the next day's audition for a commercial. At the audition, she runs into Moko. Moko is having problems. Her childhood nemesis Erika Koenji has shown up at the same audition. Ever since Moko got the lead in a school play, Erika has been obsessed with crushing Moko's dream of becoming an actress. Moko, still running away from her, decides not to compete in the second round. Angry with Moko's lack of guts and faith in her own talent, Kyoko decides to slap some sense into her, and gets her to finally stand up to Erika. While they argue and work out their differences, a mysterious man listens nearby, and appears interested in their conversation.
STAGE.13	"The Battle Girls"; Transliteration: "Batoru Gāru" (Japanese: バトルガール)	December 28, 2008
The mysterious man is revealed to be the director of the commercial, and is apparently moved by their discussion. When Erika attempts to have her associates by her way through the audition, the director makes the connection to the girl the two others were talking about and Erika, and refuses the bribery. Unable to buy her way in, Erika insists Kyoko and Moko not to have any discussions about the audition (being from the same company, they would have better rapport than others who just met) when the director decided that the next stage, along with the actual commercial, will have two girls in it. However, they manage to pass the first test with just one line within the 60-second time frame and without any practice, unlike all other pairings, who had 20 minutes of preparation. In the second test, Kyoko's idea for the act is stolen by Erika (who manage to pull it off first, as she overheard Kyoko deciding). Kyoko stands horrified, wondering whether they would be able to pass the audition, while both Moko and the director realize that Erika stole Kyoko's idea, and they ponder separately what will happen.
STAGE.14	"The Secret Stamp Album"; Transliteration: "Himitsu no Sutanpu Chou" (Japanese: 秘密のスタンプ帳)	January 11, 2009
Due to Kyoko's quick thinking for the impromptu but amazing act, Kyoko and Moko were chosen by the company. Erika was so angry at Moko-san for beaten her twice, plotting to using violence so that she will get the part of Moko in the commercial. While Kyoko and Moko were strolling around town together, she found out that Moko didn't have any true friends before and told Moko-san that she will be Moko-san's first true friend. Kyoko accidentally confesses her feelings (friendship) towards Moko and is embarrassed pushing Moko away and interrupting Erika's plan to destroy Moko, Moko tells her that if she wants to be acknowledged as her rival, she should step out of her comfort zone and get her hands dirty. Kyoko was so happy because it was the same things that Kyoko told her before. When Kyoko was sleeping soundly on the bus, Moko secretly stamped a full 100% in the stamp album for Kyoko.
STAGE.15	"Together in the Minefield"; Transliteration: "Jiraigen to Issho" (Japanese: 地雷原と一緒)	January 18, 2009
Ren is talking on his phone with Matsushima, the head of L.M.E.'s acting division, who informs him that his regular manager is out with a cold and that Kyoko will be filling in. Due to the tensions between them, Ren is cold toward her and tells her she won't be able do much as his manager. The first day goes poorly for Kyoko, who can't seem to do anything right, and she feels useless because Ren has been picking up the slack every time she messes up. While driving with Ren that evening, thinking about how much he must hate her, Kyoko's stomach starts to growl. Ren notices, so they stop at a cheap family restaurant to eat dinner. While there, some high-school girls spot Ren and loudly joke about Kyoko's work uniform, saying that a girl around her age should be in high school. Kyoko becomes angry because she dropped out of school. After dinner, as Ren drives Kyoko home, he asks her why she didn't go to high school. Kyoko explains everything to Ren including her plan to get revenge on Sho by surpassing him in show business. Ren reveals that her motivation disgusts him, and Kyoko finally realizes that this is why Ren has been cold towards her. While trying to explain herself, Kyoko receives a phone call from the president of L.M.E., who has apparently been trying to reach her all day. He asks her if she would like to attend a local performance-arts oriented high school. Kyoko happily accepts and the president tells her she will have to pass an entrance exam. The next day, while Ren is shooting scenes, Kyoko notices him frequently coughing and clearing his throat. When Ren takes a break, Kyoko tells him she thinks he is coming down with a cold and that he should take medicine to help him. Ren isn't convinced, saying he never catches a cold, and ignores her. By the following morning, Ren has developed a sore throat and a high fever. Kyoko chides him for his stubbornness and Ren apologizes for being too proud. On set, Ren must do a scene in which he is drenched with rain. Kyoko, fearing it would worsen his fever, tells him not to shoot the scene until he recovers, but Ren says he will keep acting no matter how ill he may feel, only stopping if he passes out. Because his inexperienced co-star has trouble saying her lines, Ren is forced to shoot the rain scene multiple times. Back in the dressing room, Ren passes out, awkwardly trapping Kyoko beneath him.
STAGE.16	"Dislike X Dislike"; Transliteration: "Kirai X Kirai" (Japanese: 嫌い×嫌い)	January 25, 2009
Kyoko continues to take care of Ren. In this episode, his positive thoughts and reactions are shown as she takes care of him. When she is at his apartment nursing him through his fever, Ren thanks Kyoko in a 'kind' manner. Kyoko keeps thinking about Ren's thanking and is unable to focus on reviewing for the entrance exam. Later at the set, when Ren has difficulty memorizing his lines, Kyoko recites the lines of his partner to help him. Ren realizes how far Kyoko has come in learning how to act. He compliments her progress and her response is that learning to act is fun. He questions her response, believing that she's studying acting to get revenge on Sho Fuwa. Kyoko corrects him, saying that she's doing it to discover a new Kyoko Mogami. That night she stays over at Ren's apartment again because he's not yet fully recovered. When he discovers her slumped over her textbooks, fast asleep, he wakes her and urges her to use the guest bedroom. She protests, saying she still has to review for the entrance exam. He observes that she's acting as if she has to get a perfect score and she realizes she's fallen back on her habit of always trying to get 100% in order to please her mother, but now can relax. The next morning, when Ren and Kyoko are running late due to heavy traffic, she "borrows" a bike and says that she will take them on time. He admires her tenacity and thinks to himself that he will grant her full marks as his manager.
STAGE.17	"The Date of Destiny"; Transliteration: "Unmei no DATE" (Japanese: 運命のDATE)	February 1, 2009
Kyoko begins her first day as a high school student. She's excited to be a "normal high school girl," but later finds out that her high school rather abnormal since she's in the entertainment class where the students are celebrities. On her way to her working place, Kyoko overhears two female passersby talking about the Kyurara commercial and saying that the "short-haired one" (Kyoko) was "average" and "not cut out to be a celebrity," which reminds Kyoko of Sho. While upset about the passersby's comments, Kyoko receives a call from Ren, who is on the balcony above her. Apparently, Ren especially came to thank Kyoko for being his substitute manager; he also comments that Kyoko looks good in her school uniform. Ren gives Kyoko a 100-point stamp, but then deducts 10 points after Kyoko says she was only fulfilling her duties as a substitute manager. Kyoko gets angry when the points are deducted, but Ren brushes it off by saying that he grabbed the wrong stamp and covers it up with his fake, gentlemanly smile, but she realizes he's lying. Back at L.M.E., Kyoko receives a job offer from Queen Record to work on Sho's promo. Initially, Kyoko angrily declines. After Moko-san told her that she used an actor as a stepping stone to boost her career, Kyoko decides to use this opportunity to use Sho as a "stepping stone" like he used her; she goes back to Sawara-san and accepts the job offer. Yashiro is surprised when Ren says that Kyoko doesn't know he is going to be doing an out-of-Tokyo shoot. Yashiro thought that Ren and Kyoko had gotten closer since he noticed that Ren now looks at Kyoko more kindly; however, Ren said he didn't notice any difference. When Ren gets on the plane, he thinks to himself that he's relieved that Kyoko didn't study acting just to get revenge on Sho. He also wishes that Kyoko wouldn't see Sho until she forgets about him. Meanwhile, Kyoko is at Queen Record waiting in a room. Thinking that it's Sho's fault that she's kept waiting, Kyoko gets up and starts heading towards the door to investigate. The door opens and there stands Sho! To prevent Sho from finding out her true identity, Kyoko acts cute to lower his suspicions. The producer, Haruki Asami, meets up with them in the hallway and the three of them go to the correct waiting room where Mimori rushes over to Sho. Asami introduces Mimori to Kyoko and starts explaining about the promo. Kyoko enthusiastically volunteers to be the angel who kills the devil (Sho) while Mimori is thrilled to be the other angel who falls in love with the devil. After that, the four of them proceeds to lunch. Seeing the way Mimori behaves around Sho reminds Kyoko of her old self. Mimori personally made Sho a bento, but didn't know that Sho doesn't like sweet omelet. Knowing so, to prevent Sho from throwing away the omelet in front of Mimori, Kyoko instinctively flicks a pack of salt over to Sho, which raises Sho's suspicions about Kyoko's true identity again.
STAGE.18	"Sin like an Angel"; Transliteration: "Tsumi wa Tenshi no Youni" (Japanese: 罪は天使のように)	February 8, 2009
After Kyoko flicks a packet of salt to Sho, who intended to throw away a sweet egg roll because he dislikes sweet stuff, she begins to stress out and regret her actions as she believed she may have revealed her true identity to him. Sho begins to suspect 'Kyoko' is in fact the 'Kyoko Mogami' that he had known since childhood. He recalls an incident sometime ago involving Kyoko staring at a cosmetic item in a store that she liked and had given a name for. He uses this cosmetic that he has picked up and successfully reveals Kyoko's identity by luring her to recall the name that she had once given to this item (a name that only the two of them know). Having revealed her identity, Sho decides not to fire Kyoko from the filming because of his egotistic personality and his desire to see how far Kyoko can 'surprise him'. Kyoko replies that Sho will soon regret that he didn't fire her from the set. After her reappearance onto the set having put on her costumes and completed her make-up, Sho is shocked and speechless at the dramatic change in Kyoko's appearance. Meanwhile, at a different location, Yashiro is still pondering on Ren's suspicious actions of subtracting 10 points from Kyoko's stamp album. Yashiro describes Ren as always keen and sharp-minded, which makes Ren's excuse that he 'accidentally' gave an incorrect stamp ironic. Yashiro deduces that it was because Ren had felt jealous after he heard Kyoko's reason for her hard efforts as Ren's replacement manager, saying that it was to fulfill her responsibilities as a 'Love-Me' member, rather than wholeheartedly wanting the best for Ren. However, Ren denies this argument by saying that the deduction in points was only because he felt Kyoko did not fully understand her responsibilities as a 'Love-Me' member, which had nothing to do with his personal feelings towards Kyoko. Back at the studio as the filming begins, Sho observes Kyoko's personality and acting skills, and thinks to himself that she is no longer the 'Kyoko Mogami' that he once knew, but has now regarded her as a rival or even a potential threat to his career. Meanwhile, Mimori is jealous of Kyoko's previous relationship with Sho and is making her work with Kyoko difficult because of her hatred. But her feelings towards Kyoko soon disappear after the filming started, because of Kyoko's captivating acting skills that draws others into the situation and make them respond appropriately. Asami notices Sho's staring at Kyoko and warns him not to become captivated by Kyoko's acting skills just as Mimori has become, and Sho thinks to himself that Kyoko intends to 'eat him alive' with her skills. When it was finally time for Kyoko to begin shooting her scenes with Sho (angel killing the devil scene), Kyoko finds it hard to restrain her anger and desires to kill Sho for real, that she overdoes her part and retakes a few times. This leads to the progression of the filming being slowed down and while being given a break to recollect herself, Sho mocks Kyoko's 'incompetent' acting skills and her inability to 'surprise' him further other than her change in appearance.
STAGE.19	"The Last Ritual"; Transliteration: "Saigo no Gishiki" (Japanese: 最期の儀式)	February 15, 2009
The episode begins with Kyoko moping over not being able to 'kill Sho like an angel'. She then calls Moko and gets an idea on how to act properly. She imagines that she will be killing Moko's lover for hurting her. Kyoko calls Ren afterwards and he isn't there so she leaves a voice message but realizes she doesn't want him to know she's acting in Sho's PV, so fails to mention her problem. Meanwhile, Mimori is busy rewatching a part of the promo where Sho kisses her hair. Sho sees Kyoko walking towards him and looks at her. Kyoko's face looks deep in frustration and anger and Sho reaches out to her but Kyoko walks away. They start to shoot the killing scene again and Kyoko acts with angelic grace, and cries leaving Sho shocked and forgetting to do his part, since he never knew what to do when Kyoko cried. They film again and one of the workers state that Kyoko and Sho look like a couple this way. Kyoko teases Sho because of his mistake but even after quarreling, they acted perfectly. After all that, Mimori knocks on Sho's door and comes in. Sho says in a sloppy tone, and Mimori starts crying because she thinks that Sho keeps thinking about Kyoko. Sho hugs her and she's in a hot gaze so her manager carries her away. Kyoko passes by and states how she didn't know Sho had the power to stop a girl's tears when in their childhood, when she cried, Sho was just standing there watching her. Kyoko didn't want to trouble him and finds a special place to cry alone. That's where she met Corn, the mysterious boy (who was Ren). Kyoko's phone rings and it was from Ren. She starts talking and instead of saying that she had a problem she said that a wonderful event happened today at work. Sho then grabs the phone and ends the conversation by saying it was wonderful because she had made herself more famous by appearing in his promo. Switching to Ren's scene, he thinks to himself that the person who was speaking at the end was Sho Fuwa.
STAGE.20	"Invitation to the Moon"; Transliteration: "Tsuki no Sasoi" (Japanese: 月の誘い)	February 22, 2009
Kyoko's been scouted for an upcoming drama. However, upon learning she'd be working with Ren, she was quite nervous but excited as she would be able to see Ren up close and personal in his "serious" acting mode. Meanwhile, Ren's troubled as the president points out his acting on love is too fake and may be revealed in his upcoming project, as well as Yashiro's badgering of his relationship with Kyoko.
STAGE.21	"The One Who Deserves to Be"; Transliteration: "Shikaku o Motsu Mono" (Japanese: 資格を持つ者)	March 1, 2009
Kyoko landed a role in Dark Moon, the re-make of Tsukigomori, a drama that was popular 20 years ago, and the actors and the director in the current drama wish to surpass Tsukigomori. Ren is also in the drama as Katsuki (with Kyoko as Mio, though she only accepted the role when Ren declared his being in the drama; she had not wanted to take on the role initially because she wouldn't be a "refined, rich lady"). Kyoko runs into trouble (Ms. Iizuka, who played Mio in Tsukigomori and plays Mio's mother in Dark Moon). She is questioned of her role. However, Kyoko is unable to answer one of the questions and Ms. Iizuka wants to fire her.
STAGE.22	"The Day the World Shattered"; Transliteration: "Sekai ga Kowareta Nichi" (Japanese: 世界が壊れた日)	March 8, 2009
Kyoko was given some time to think about her character, Mio, thanks to Ren. Ren also gives Kyoko a hint of why Mio would hate Mizuki but she still has a hard time understanding the cruel rich lady that she's playing. While talking with Ren's manager and thinking about the role, she finally discovers her Mio and runs off. (Yashiro tells Kyoko that Ren is in love with her, but Kyoko did not hear as she was busy thinking about the role). When Yashiro tells everyone that she's gone, Ms. Iizuka thinks that Kyoko run away from work and demands that Director Ogata fire Kyoko, but Ren persists in believing in her and persuades the director to wait. When Kyoko comes back she arrived with her own short hair colored black. When Ren calls her, she seems to be reading the Dark Moon script and ignores him. When he tries touching her face, she stops his hand with the script pushing it away while showing a look of intense hatred in her eyes. The director and Ren conclude that it's not Kyoko sitting before them but Mio. Initially the director thinks that he can't use this kind of Mio, since the original character was a shy, introverted girl, while Kyoko's Mio is prideful; but Ren convinces him to try out this new Mio. And so they ask Ms. Iizuka (who played Mio in Tsukigomori – 20 years ago, but playing Mio's mother in Dark Moon) to test Mio, to see how Kyoko would present her character. While they test Kyoko's Mio the director discovers that her Mio, while being unlike the original Mio, is much more intense and more credible. Instead of finding faults in this Mio, the director catches himself finding faults in the original Mio. The director finally decides he needs to make a whole new world for the Kyoko's Mio and she passes the test.
STAGE.23	"And the Trigger was Pulled"; Transliteration: "Hikareta Hikigane" (Japanese: ひかれた引き金)	March 15, 2009
Kyoko's Mio, now progressed, is widely accepted by the entire cast, including Ms. Iizuka. Problems develop, however, when Ren's acting is not up to its usual standard (as predicted by the president in 'Invitation to the Moon') and has to perform numerous takes. It is later discovered that one reason for the difficulties lies in Kyoko's Mio being somewhat intimidating, though Ren vows to make his version of Katsuki outshine the original and become the equal of Kyoko's character.
STAGE.24	"The Permissible Encounter"; Transliteration: "Sono Kontakuto wa Yurusareru" (Japanese: そのコンタクトは許される)	March 22, 2009
Ren loses the ability to act as Katsuki. Because of this, he had an emotional meltdown. The director asked him to take some time off and find his "Katsuki" that can surpass the original. Meanwhile, Sho is acting surprisingly calm about seeing Kyoko's and Ren's names on Dark Moon's promo poster. But actually, thanks to his imagination, he becomes angry, with jealousy, perhaps? Putting herself in Ren's shoes, Kyoko realizes that he needs help. She decides to use Bo to help him after running into him in the same spot as his last minor meltdown. They talk, and Kyoko finds out about Ren's lack of a love life. She finds out that his love life problem is what's bothering him, and keeping him from playing a good Katsuki. In the end, (although she seems to be confusing his love life with the characters, and doesn't seem to realize he has really fallen with someone) Kyoko makes Ren see that he is starting to fall in love for the first time. However, Kyoko does not realize that the girl he is falling in love with is her.
STAGE.25	"And Then the Door Opens"; Transliteration: "Soshite Tobira wa Akareru" (Japanese: そして扉は開かれる)	March 29, 2009
Ren is flashing back to his conversation with Bo. He's confused about his feelings with Kyoko. His shoot for Dark Moon is coming up and, as always, he's not eating properly. Kyoko is asked to go to his house and feed him and she does. While there, it's uncomfortably silent so they turn on the TV. The show is about a couple with a 19-year difference and the man is her teacher. A similar situation which sets them both on edge. Later, he drives her home and when she says something, he hides his feelings and realizes it later. Kyoko wishes on her blue Corn stone and wishes for Ren's strength. The next day, they both go to the set and she talks about how far she's come.
