= Triangle Staff =

Japanese animation studio

Triangle Staff Corp.
- Native name: 有限会社トライアングルスタッフ
- Romanized name: Yūgen-gaisha Toraianguru Sutaffu
- Type: Yūgen gaisha
- Industry: Japanese animation
- Founded: January 1987; 39 years ago
- Founder: Yoshimi Asari
- Defunct: December 2002; 23 years ago
- Successor: Palm Studio; A.C.G.T
- Headquarters: Suginami, Tokyo, Japan
- Website: Archived site

Triangle Staff Corp. (Japanese: 有限会社トライアングルスタッフ, Hepburn: Yūgen-gaisha Toraianguru Sutaffu) was a Japanese animation studio established in 1987 from former Madhouse staff, producing series such as Macross Plus, Serial Experiments Lain, and NieA_7. The studio ceased operations in 2000, when they were set to do the animation production on WXIII: Patlabor the Movie 3.

== History ==
Triangle Staff was established in 1987 from Yoshimi Asari in Ogikubo, Tokyo. The company initially produced OVA, and later began producing anime television series in collaboration with TV Tokyo.

In 1998, the company released Serial Experiments Lain receiving the Excellent Award from the animation division of the Japan Media Arts Festival.

In March 1999, Katsumi Yamaguchi, an animator from the company, established his own animation studio, Palm Studio. Later in December 2000, animators Shojiro Abe and Takeshi Baba established A.C.G.T, a subsidiary of OB Planning Co., Ltd.

Triangle Staff ceased all operations in December 2000, though the exact reason and time of it shutting down remain unknown. After the discontinuation, the name of the company was still shown on the copyright trademark and the staff list embedded in the studios' productions.

The company was still producing WXIII: Patlabor the Movie 3 at the time it went defunct. Production was later taken over by Madhouse and was released in theaters on March 30, 2002 (though Triangle Staff's involvement would be acknowledged in the film's end credits).

== Works ==
=== Television series ===
- Chibi Neko Tomu no Daibouken: Chikyuu wo Sukue! Nakama-tachi (1992, special)
- Hareluya II Boy (1997)
- Shinkai Densetsu Meremanoid (1997–1998)
- Serial Experiments Lain (1998)
- St. Luminous Mission High School (1998)
- Magic User's Club (1999, co-animated with Madhouse)
- Space Pirate Mito (1999)
- Mito's Great Adventure: The Two Queens (1999)
- Colorful (1999)
- NieA_7 (2000)

=== Original video animations ===
- Kaze to Ki no Uta: Sanctus (November 6, 1987)
- CB Chara Nagai Go World (February 21 – June 27, 1991)
- Iron Virgin Jun (July 21, 1992)
- Junkers Come Here: Memories of You (1994)
- Macross Plus (August 25, 1994 – June 25, 1995)
- Mighty Space Miners (1994–1995)
- Hyper Doll (September 25 – November 25, 1995)
- Legend of Crystania: The Chaos Ring (November 21, 1996 – April 3, 1997)
- Magic User's Club (May 25, 1996 – October 25, 1997)
- Shamanic Princess (June 25, 1996 – June 25, 1998)
- Psychic Force (1998)
- Harlock Saga (1999; #5–6, co-animated with Studio Cab and Bee Media)
- Weiß Kreuz Verbrechen & Strafe (November 25, 1999 - February 23, 2000)

=== Films ===
- Catnapped! (July 12, 1995)
- Junkers Come Here (July 20, 1995)
- Kazu & Yasu Hero Tanjō (July 22, 1995)
- Legend of Crystania: The Motion Picture (July 29, 1995)
- Macross Plus: Movie Edition (August 27, 1995)
- Chocchan's Story (March 20, 1996)
- Soriton no Akuma (1997)
- Ultra Nyan: Hoshizora Kara Maiorita Fushigi Neko (1997)
- A Chinese Ghost Story: The Tsui Hark Animation (1997)
- Ultra Nyan 2: Happy Daisakusen (1998)
