= List of Hug! Pretty Cure episodes =

- Season 15
- Last Japanese DVD Disc volume released by Marvelous AQL, featuring (clockwise from the top) Cure Yell, Cure Amour, Cure Etoile, Cure Ange, Cure Macherie, and (centre) Hugtan.
- No. of episodes: 49

Release
- Original network: ANN (ABC)
- Original release: February 4, 2018 – January 27, 2019

Series chronology
- ← Previous; Kirakira PreCure a la Mode Next → Star☆Twinkle PreCure

Hug! PreCure is the fifteenth television anime series in Izumi Todo's Pretty Cure franchise, produced by Asahi Broadcasting Corporation and Toei Animation. The series began airing in Japan on February 4, 2018, succeeding Kirakira PreCure a la Mode in its initial time-slot and was succeeded by Star Twinkle PreCure.

The opening theme is "We Can!! Hugtto! PreCure" (We Can!! HUGっと! プリキュア, We Can!! Hagutto! Purikyua) by Kanako Miyamoto. The first ending theme is "With a Hug! Future✩Dreamer" (HUGっと! 未来☆ドリーマー, Hugtto! Mirai✩Dorīma) performed by Rie Hikisaka, Rina Honnizumi, and Yui Ogura, while the second ending theme is "With a Hug! Yell For You" (HUGっと! Yell for You, Hugtto! Yell for You) performed by Hikisaka, Honnizumi, Ogura, Nao Tamura, and Yukari Tamura.

== Episode list ==
No.	Title	Original release date
1	"Hooray Hooray, Everyone! The PreCure of Spirit, Cure Yell is Born!"; Transliteration: "Furefure Minna! Genki no Purikyua, Kyua Ēru Tanjō!" (Japanese: フレフレみんな！元気のプリキュア、キュアエール誕生！)	February 4, 2018
On the first day at her new school, things don't go too well for Hana Nono as she cuts her bangs short and ends up late for school. Just then, time briefly stops and she hears a baby's voice. She follows it to the rooftop, where she meets two other students, Saaya Yakushiji and Homare Kagayaki. Later that night, a baby named Hugtan and a hamster named Hariham Harry suddenly fall from the sky into Hana's house before disappearing just as mysteriously. The next day, Charalit, a dark employee of the evil Criasu Corporation, uses the negative energy of the students to summon a monster known as an Oshimaida. Noticing Hugtan is in danger, Hana rushes to her aid and gains the power of the Pretty Cure, using the Mirai Crystal and PreHeart to transform into Cure Yell and defeat the Oshimaida.
2	"Everyone's Angel! Hooray Hooray! Cure Ange!"; Transliteration: "Minna no Tenshi! Furefure! Kyua Anju!" (Japanese: みんなの天使！フレフレ！キュアアンジュ！)	February 11, 2018
While keeping her identity as a Pretty Cure a secret from her classmates, Hana hears from Harry about how the Cryase Corporation is aiming to steal the Mirai Crystals and rob the world of its future. After Hana helps her work on the school newspaper, Saaya comes over to Harry's newly established hideout to help Hana look after Hug-tan, revealing she had experienced the same time stop as she did. Just as Hana and Saaya start to become friends, Charalit summons another Oshimaida, prompting Hana to reveal her identity as a Precure to Saaya. With Hana struggling to fight on her own, Saaya's courage grants her her own Mirai Crystal, allowing her to transform into Cure Ange and help Hana defeat the Oshimaida.
3	"Happy? Cranky? Hug-tan's Outing!"; Transliteration: "Gokigen? Naname? Odekake Hagu-tan!" (Japanese: ごきげん？ナナメ？おでかけはぐたん！)	February 18, 2018
When Hug-tan starts acting cranky, Harry gives the girls the Mirai Pad, which points them towards something that will settle her down. Arriving at a petting zoo, Hana and Saaya come across Homare before they are joined by Hana's mother Sumire, who takes them to a tower and helps lull Hug-tan to sleep. When asked about the whereabouts of Hug-tan's mother, Harry explains how only he and Hug-tan managed to use the White Mirai Crystal to escape from their world before it was frozen in time by the enemy. Just then, Charalit summons yet another Oshimaida to attack the tower, prompting Hana and Saaya into action. Although the Oshimaida inflates to massive size, Hana manages to power through and defeat it. Afterwards, as Hana's family offer to help Harry with looking after Hug-tan, Homare feels a sense of longing after seeing the Precure in battle.
4	"Shine! The Great PreCure Scouting Plan Operation!"; Transliteration: "Kagayake! Purikyua Sukauto Daisakusen!" (Japanese: 輝け！プリキュアスカウト大作戦！)	February 25, 2018
While thinking about scouting Homare as the third PreCure, Hana comes across her taking care of a stray dog, which she rescued while experiencing a time stop herself. Noticing some kids getting bullied over the use of a basketball field, Homare challenges the bullies to a match, but freezes up before making a throw, after which Hana wins the game by luck. Afterwards, the girls learn that Homare was once a famous ice skater who injured her leg following a failed jump, the mental scars of which have remained with her even though her leg had since healed. Just then, Charalit targets Homare's teacher to summon another Oshimaida, leading Hana and Saaya to reveal their identities and transform. As the Cures fight against the Oshimaida, Homare's feelings of wanting to fly again brings birth to her own Mirai Crystal, but her trauma over her failed jump leads her to hesitate, resulting in her Mirai Crystal disappearing before she can catch it. Noticing the Oshimaida react to the teacher's regret over not being able to help Homare, Hana manages to defeat it and return him to normal, but Homare still remains downhearted.
5	"Dance in the Sky! Hooray Hooray! Cure Etoile!"; Transliteration: "Sora o Mae! Furefure! Kyua Etowāru!" (Japanese: 宙を舞え！フレフレ！キュアエトワール！)	March 4, 2018
Homare is asked to help Harry set up his new shop, Beauty Harry, helping it to have a successful launch. Still concerned about Homare, Hana and Saaya assure her that there are things she can do that they can't. Just then, Charalit kidnaps Homare and traps her on the side of a building, using her negative energy over being unable to clear the gap over to the next building to summon another Oshimaida. Despite her fear, Homare regains her determination, finally obtaining her Mirai Crystal and the ability to transform into Cure Etoile. Combining their strengths, the three Cures manage to defeat the Oshimaida before becoming good friends.
6	"Smiles in Full Bloom! Our First Job!"; Transliteration: "Egao, Mankai! Hajimete no Oshigoto!" (Japanese: 笑顔、満開！はじめてのおしごと！)	March 11, 2018
To celebrate getting the team together, Hana takes everyone to a home center owned by her father Shintarou. Learning that the florist Mari is short-handed due to her part-time staff being off with colds, Hana and the others decide to help out, using the Mirai Pad to change into florists. As Hana becomes racked by a sense of deja vu upon seeing Saaya carry flowers, Hug-tan is picked up by a young customer, prompting the girls to search around the store for her until Shintarou manages to catch her. Just then, another employee of the Cryase Corporation, Papple, targets Mari to summon a Plant Oshimaida, but the Cures quickly manage to defeat it. As Sumire offers to help the girls experience all kinds of jobs, she recognises Saaya as a child actress who starred in an old vegetable commercial.
7	"Saaya is Lost? What is it You Really Want To Do?"; Transliteration: "Saaya no Mayoi? Hontō ni Yaritai Kototte Nani?" (Japanese: さあやの迷い？本当にやりたいことって何？)	March 18, 2018
Saaya feels anxious over taking part in an audition against another actress who was in the same commercial, especially when it is revealed her mother, Reira, is a famous actress. Noticing Saaya becoming nervous during her audition, Hana and Homare disguise themselves as air attendants stumbling into the wrong audition to ease Saaya's nerves. Just then, the third member of Cryase, Ruru, summons another Oshimaida, using the data she had gathered from the Cures' previous battles to predict their moves. However, Saaya's desire not to give up gives form to another Mirai Crystal, and she manages to turn her usual defensive abilities into an offensive one, allowing the Cures to defeat the Oshimaida. As Saaya ends up failing her audition, but is nonetheless grateful for having taking part and figuring out her feelings, a strange boy approaches Homare.
8	"Homare Withdraws!? The Skating Prince's Fast Approach!"; Transliteration: "Homare Dattai!? Sukēto Ōji ga Kyūsekkin!" (Japanese: ほまれ脱退！？スケート王子が急接近！)	March 25, 2018
Henri Wakamiya, a top skater and Homare's childhood friend, comes to ask Homare to return with him to Moscow, feeling that staying in Japan is preventing her from returning to form. As Henri remains assertive, he stands at odds with Hana, claiming that he is the only who can save her. Looking to disprove that, Homare shows Henri how much she has managed to improve thanks to Hana and Saaya's support. As Papple uses the negative energy of people stuck in traffic to summon another Oshimaida, Homare gains a new Mirai Crystal and manages to defeat it. Henri, who has deduced Homare's identity, decides to respect Homare's wishes and transfers into her school. Meanwhile, Hana comes across a peculiar man carrying a book with him.
9	"Go Over the Hill! Let's La Hiking!"; Transliteration: "Oka o Koe Yukō yo! Rettsu Ra Haikingu!" (Japanese: 丘をこえ行こうよ！レッツ・ラ・ハイキング！)	April 1, 2018
While taking part in a hiking trip, the girls come across Emiru Aisaki, the classmate of Hana's sister Kotori, who is very cautious about the dangers of hiking to the point of bewildering her classmates. When a monkey runs off with Hana's tambourine, she and Emiru become separated from their group and wind up at the bottom of a pit. As Emiru laments causing trouble for everyone, Hana praises her for always striving to help everyone, and the two become friends. After reuniting with each other, the Cures fight against a Kappa Oshimaida created by Papple.
10	"No Way! Being a Waitress is Hard Work!"; Transliteration: "Arienai! Ueitoresu-san wa Ōisogashi!" (Japanese: ありえな～い！ウエイトレスさんは大忙し！)	April 8, 2018
Using the Mirai Pad to help out at a food fair, Saaya and Homare become waitresses while Hana alone gets stuck in a different outfit helping out at a takoyaki stand. As the other two excel at their jobs, Hana becomes downhearted, feeling that she isn't able to do anything worthwhile. While trying to help draw customers to the takoyaki stand, Hana's reaction to trying one of the takoyaki draws laughs from the crowd, leading her to feel she messed up and run off in tears. When Papple attacks with another Oshimaida, Hana finds herself unable to transform, forcing Saaya and Homare to fight without her. Just as things look desperate, Hug-tan uses her own asu power to protect Hana and defeat the Oshimaida, falling into a deep sleep as a result of exhausting herself.
11	"The PreCure I Want To Become! Resonate! Melody Sword!"; Transliteration: "Watashi ga Naritai Purikyua! Hibike! Merodi Sōdo!" (Japanese: 私がなりたいプリキュア！響け！メロディソード！)	April 15, 2018
With Hug-tan ending up with a fever as a result of exhausting her asu power, Hana blames herself, feeling she doesn't deserve to be a Precure as she doesn't have anything special she can do. After Sumire gives her some comfort, Hana is approached by Saaya and Homare, who assure Hana that it is her special qualities that helped them. Following a hint from the Mirai Pad to go to the Nobinobi Tower, Hana has Hug-tan hear her heartbeat, allowing her to recover. Just as Hana runs into the man from before, the tower is attacked by Charalit, who has been transformed into an Oshimaida himself. Once again able to transform into a Precure, Hana gains her second Mirai Crystal which transforms into a magical sword. However, Hana chooses not to attack, sensing that the real Charalit is still inside the Oshimaida, becoming consumed by his insecurities. Sympathising with Charalit's pain, Hana transforms the sword into the Melody Swords, allowing the Cures to purify Charalit, after which Hug-tan calls Hana "Mama".
12	"Heart-pounding! A Pajama Party With Everyone!"; Transliteration: "Dokidoki! Minna de Pajama Pātī!" (Japanese: ドキドキ！みんなでパジャマパーティー！)	April 22, 2018
The girls hold a pajama party at Harry's store, during which they discover Hug-tan has grown some teeth. After the girls watch some scary movies, Harry explains that he and Hug-tan both came from the future. Just then, Papple summons a Vending Machine Oshimaida, but the Cures use their Melody Swords to defeat it. Afterwards, the girls spend the remainder of their pajama party chatting all night. The next day, Ruru alters Sumire's memories in order to infiltrate Hana's home as a family friend from abroad.
13	"The Transfer Student is Fresh & Mysterious!"; Transliteration: "Tenkōsei wa Furesshu & Misuteriasu!" (Japanese: 転校生はフレッシュ＆ミステリアス！)	April 29, 2018
To aid in her mission of observing Hana, Ruru transfers into her class under the name Ruru Amour, excelling in both studies and sports. Hana's family tries to hold Ruru a surprise welcoming party, but she seems disinterested, claiming there is no logical merit to it. Later, Hana goes searching for Ruru amidst an Oshimaida attack, unaware that she is the one who summoned it. When Ruru questions Hana over why she feels the need to look for her, she is taken aback when she tells her she wants to be her family.
14	"Hug You! A Whole Bunch of Baby Smiles!"; Transliteration: "Hagyu~! Aka-chan Sumairu Meippai!" (Japanese: はぎゅ～！赤ちゃんスマイルめいっぱい！)	May 6, 2018
Ruru joins the others as they spend the day looking after babies at a daycare. As Ruru quickly scans a textbook to learn how to look after the babies, Saaya starts becoming competitive with her over their affections. Later, Ruru summons an Oshimaida in order to split the Cures' attention between fighting it and protecting the frightened children. However, Ruru then has a change of heart, stepping in to protect the children while the Cures defeat the Oshimaida.
15	"Odd Duo...? Emiru and Ruru's Certain Day"; Transliteration: "Meikonbi...? Emiru to Rūrū no Toaru Ichinichi" (Japanese: 迷コンビ。。。？えみるとルールーのとある一日)	May 13, 2018
Sent on an errand to buy some eggs for the Nono family, Ruru comes across Emiru, who has made her own PreCure persona to try and help others. Taking a liking to Ruru, Emiru invites her to her house to play her guitar for her. When Emiru's brother Masato claims that the guitar isn't fitting for a girl, Ruru gets upset and stands up for Emiru. As Papple sends in another Oshimaida to attack, Emiru rushes in to save a child from danger, earning praise from the real Cures.
16	"Everyone's Charisma!? Master Homare is Strict"; Transliteration: "Minna no Karisuma!? Homare Shishō wa Tsurai yo" (Japanese: みんなのカリスマ！？ほまれ師匠はつらいよ)	May 20, 2018
Homare's classmate Aki asks her to teach her how to skate, much to the ire of her friend Junna. As Homare remains conflicted over what to do, Ruru steals her PreHeart under orders from Papple, who targets Aki and Junna to summon an Oshimaida. As Hana and Saaya struggle to fight the Oshimaida on her own, Ruru makes the decision to return Homare's PreHeart so she can aid them. Noticing Homare's efforts to save them, Aki and Junna make up with each other, weakening the Oshimaida and allowing the Cures to defeat it. As punishment for her actions, Ruru is hit by a beam that shuts her down and is taken away by Papple.
17	"The Noise of Sadness... Goodbye, Ruru"; Transliteration: "Kanashimi no Noizu... Sayonara, Rūrū" (Japanese: 哀しみのノイズ。。。さよなら、ルールー)	May 27, 2018
In addition to deleting the memories that Ruru had made with everyone, Criasu member Listle reprograms her with a battle protocol. Meanwhile, Harry explains that Ruru is an android sent to spy on them, but the girls remain determined to save her. Following her reprogramming, Ruru equips a battle suit and confronts the Cures, using their battle data to predict their moves. As Ruru tries to obtain more data from the Cures, she starts to regain the memories that she herself prevented from being deleted. With help from Hana, Ruru gains a human heart and turns against the Criasu Corporation. As Ruru finally rejoins the others, Emiru discovers the Cures' secret identity.
18	"An Odd Pair! The Melody of the Heart!"; Transliteration: "Dekoboko Konbi! Kokoro no Merodi!" (Japanese: でこぼこコンビ！心のメロディ！)	June 3, 2018
Ruru undoes the memory manipulation on Hana's family, but finds she is accepted all the same. The next day, Emiru confronts the girls about their secret identities, asking to observe their daily lives to see what makes them so special. As Ruru starts to worry that she lacks a heart like others, she experiences a sudden system error, leading the others to tell Emiru that she is an android. As Emiru worries about how to help Ruru, Papple attacks with a Oshimaida with the ability to change forms. As Emiru helps Ruru stand up to Papple, the Cures manage to defeat the Oshimaida, after which Emiru and Ruru bond over music.
19	"Exciting! The Aspired Runway Debut!?"; Transliteration: "Wakuwaku! Akogare no Ranwei Debyū!?" (Japanese: ワクワク！憧れのランウェイデビュー！？)	June 10, 2018
Having observed how well Ruru and Emiru match each other, Henri invites them to take part in a hero-themed fashion show with him. As the girls help designer Rita Yoshimi prepare for the festival, Masato tries to force Emiru to come home, claiming only boys can be heroes, but Henri stands against him while wearing a dress, revealing that he wears what he wants to wear. As new Criasu employee Gelos targets Masato to summon another Oshimaida, Henri notices Masato's frustration and encourages him to love himself, allowing the Cures to defeat the Oshimaida. With the fashion show a great success, both Ruru and Emiru aspire to become PreCures, only to discover there is only one PreHeart available.
20	"Cure Macherie and Cure Amour! Hooray Hooray! The PreCures of Love!"; Transliteration: "Kyua Masheri to Kyua Amūru! Furefure! Ai no Purikyua!" (Japanese: キュアマシェリとキュアアムール！フレフレ！愛のプリキュア！)	June 17, 2018
With only one PreHeart left, Ruru and Emiru are left conflicted over the fact only one of them may get to become a PreCure. As Hana gets a cold trying to wish for a miracle, Homare and Saaya tell Emiru and Ruru about the miracles they've experienced, while Masato decides to give Emiru his support in becoming a musician by giving them concert tickets. As Emiru and Ruru attend the concert together, Papple attacks with an Oshimaida. As Emiru and Ruru both receive Mirai Crystals, their desire to both become PreCures together transforms the remaining PreHeart into two, allowing them to both transform into Cure Macherie and Cure Amour respectively and defeat the Oshimaida.
21	"Big Rampage? The PreCure Emiru Wants To Become!"; Transliteration: "Daibōsō? Emiru ga Naritai Purikyua!" (Japanese: 大暴走？えみるがなりたいプリキュア！)	June 24, 2018
While excited about being a PreCure, Emiru feels downhearted over not a failed attempt at patrolling the town while Ruru becomes worried about her after Emiru lashes out at each other. After some encouragement from Homare and Harry, Emiru comes to understand the happiness that came from becoming a PreCure alongside Ruru and sorts things out with her. After Emiru's guitar gets destroyed during a battle with an Oshimaida, Hugtan, hearing her plea for an item akin to the Melody Sword, opens a portal that summons two PreCures from another world: Cure Black and Cure White.
22	"Our Song of Love! Deliver it! Twin Love Guitar!"; Transliteration: "Futari no Ai no Uta! Todoke! Tsuin Rabu Gitā!" (Japanese: ふたりの愛の歌！届け！ツインラブギター！)	July 1, 2018
Cure Black and Cure White, whose real names are Nagisa Misumi and Honoka Yukishiro respectively, assure Emiru and Ruru that it's okay to butt heads with each other sometimes. Letting out their true feelings and making up with each other, Ruru makes new guitars for her and Emiru while she makes matching bracelets. Meanwhile, Papple, feeling despair over seeing Gelos with her boyfriend, transforms herself into an Oshimaida. As Nagisa and Honoka assist the other Cures in fighting Papple, Ruru and Emiru venture inside the Oshimaida to remind Papple that she still has love. Gaining a new power, the Twin Love Guitars, the two Cures manage to purify her Oshimaida, after which Hugtan sends Nagisa and Honoka back to their world.
23	"The Worst Pinch! President Cry Appears!"; Transliteration: "Saidai no Pinchi! Purejidento Kurai Arawaru!" (Japanese: 最大のピンチ！プレジデント・クライあらわる！)	July 8, 2018
As Hana tries to figure out her own goal, she once again comes across the mysterious man, who explains his desire for an ideal world. Just then, Criasu employee Daigan attacks with an Oshimaida, only for another employee, Dr. Traum, to show up and eliminate him, transforming the Oshimaida into a more powerful Mou-Oshimaida. It is then revealed that the man Hana met is CriasuCorp's president, George Cry, who steals all of the Mirai Crystals and uses them to stop time. As Cry attempts to kidnap Hugtan as well, Hana manages to break free and save her, restoring time and allowing everyone to defeat the Mou-Oshimaida. As the Criasu team add another evil employee named Bishin to their forces, Harry keeps a secret from everyone that he is in possession of a white Mirai Crystal.
24	"An Energetic Splash! The Fascinating Night Pool!"; Transliteration: "Genki Supurasshu! Miwaku no Naito Pūru!" (Japanese: 元気スプラッシュ！魅惑のナイトプール！)	July 15, 2018
Shocked to find the town's local night pool event is lacking sense compared to what she pictured, Hana and the others help out to make the pool more stylish by the time it opens. As the girls enjoy the event, Hana tries to hide from everyone how shaken she is over her encounter with Cry. Just as Gelos attacks with a Mou-Oshimaida and Hana's fear starts to arise again, the negative energy is blasted away by Emiru and Ruru's music, giving Hana the encouragement to fight alongside the Cures and defeat it. Afterwards, Charalit, Papple, and Daigan, who are now reformed, approach Emiru and Ruru about joining their talent agency.
25	"Summer Festival, Fireworks, and Harry's Secret"; Transliteration: "Natsumatsuri to Hanabi to Harī no Himitsu" (Japanese: 夏祭りと花火とハリーのヒミツ)	July 22, 2018
As the gang spend time at a summer festival, Homare, who has been developing feelings for Harry, learns a bit about his past while also sharing some of her own. Just then, they are approached by Bishin, who reveals that Harry was a former employee of Criasu Corp and breaks the necklace he was wearing, transforming him into a ferocious beast. As Harry goes out of control, Homare, firm in her belief in him, manages to reach his heart and return him to normal.
26	"Related to a Famous Actress! Saaya and Her Mother"; Transliteration: "Dai Joyū ni Mitchaku! Saaya to Okāsan" (Japanese: 大女優に密着！さあやとおかあさん)	July 29, 2018
Noticing Saaya is worried about whether she should pursue the same acting career as her mother, Reira, the gang go a TV studio to ask her directly. While not feeling confident after talking to Reira, Saaya meets the staff members who supported Reira as she worked hard to be both an actor and a good mother, learning how she still tries her best and reminding herself of why she always supported her. After defeating a Mou-Oshimaida sent by Gelos, Saaya manages to make it her dream to one day work alongside Reira.
27	"Teacher's Daddy Training! Hello, Baby!"; Transliteration: "Sensei no Papa Shugyō! Konnichiwa, Aka-chan!" (Japanese: 先生のパパ修行！こんにちは、あかちゃん！)	August 12, 2018
Hana's teacher Uchifuji, whose wife Yuka is due to have a baby, begins working at Hugman in order to learn how to be a good father from Shintarou. While initially struggling to get Hug-tan to stop crying, Uchifuji gets some useful advice from Shintarou and Charalit. Later, as Yuka goes into labor, everyone manages to get her and Uchifuji to the hospital and deliver a healthy baby. When Dr. Traum attacks with a Mou-Oshimaida, Saaya, who had gained an appreciation for a mid-wife's work, gets the other Cures to defeat it quietly.
28	"Catch That Girl's Heart♡ Hooray Hooray! Mogumogu!"; Transliteration: "Ano Ko no Hāto o Kyatchi♡ Furefure! Mogumogu!" (Japanese: あのコのハートをキャッチ♡フレフレ！もぐもぐ！)	August 19, 2018
Homare's pet dog, Mogumogu, falls in love with a cat named Lily who appears in a commercial. Wanting Mogumogu to meet Lily, the gang train him to take part in an audition to star in a commercial with her. Meanwhile, Ruru laments that a love between different species will never work, feeling sympathy as an android, but Emiru assures her that it doesn't affect her feelings for her. On the day of the auditions, as Mogumogu works hard through each event, Bishin has a Mou-Oshimaida possess a robot intended for the final round. Noticing a girl in trouble, Mogumogu overcomes his fear of monsters to protect her, giving Ruru and Emiru a chance to beat the Mou-Oshimaida. Although the audition is cancelled, Mogumogu gets to meet Lily, who is owned by the girl he rescued.
29	"Settle it Right Here! The Recipe to Grandma's Fighting Spirit!"; Transliteration: "Koko de Kimeru yo! Obā-chan no Kiai no Reshipi!" (Japanese: ここで決めるよ！おばあちゃんの気合のレシピ！)	August 26, 2018
Hana takes everyone to meet her grandmother, Tanpopo, who runs a traditional sweets shop. However, Tanpopo, agitated by complaints about her sweets declining in quality, ends up injuring her back. Hearing about a type of manjuu that Tanpopo used to make before her husband died, Hana and the others find his old recipe book and make some to cheer her up. When Gelos attacks with a Mou-Oshimaida, Tanpopo regains her strength to protect her shop, allowing the Cures to defeat it, after which she resumes selling the manjuu with some extra help.
30	"Go Go Around the World! Everyone's Summer Vacation!"; Transliteration: "Sekai Isshū e Go Go! Minna no Natsuyasumi!" (Japanese: 世界一周へＧＯＧＯ！みんなの夏休み！)	September 2, 2018
The gang decide to end their summer vacation with a tour around the world, visiting several foreign countries before finishing with a stay a Japanese hot spring inn. However, Dr. Traum, who had coincidentally been staying at the inn, attacks with a Mou-Oshimaida. Just as the Mou-Oshimaida attempts to destroy the inn, it is stopped by a real tengu, allowing the Cures to defeat it.
31	"Time, Advance! Birth of the Memorial Cure Clock!"; Transliteration: "Toki yo, Susume! Memoriaru Kyua Kurokku Tanjō!" (Japanese: 時よ、すすめ！メモリアルキュアクロック誕生！)	September 9, 2018
Hana starts acting strangely after she is visited by Eri, an acquaintance from her previous school. Running into Saaya and Homare, Eri explains that Hana became bullied at her old school because she stood up for her, leading her to transfer schools. Receiving encouragement from the other girls, Hana helps Eri and her schoolmates with their cheergirl presentation and makes up with her. Just then, Gelos' servants use a time-stopping device they had stolen from her, only for it to go out of control and merge them together into an Oshimaida. Responding to the Cures' determination to protect everyone's memories and futures, the Mirai Pad evolves into the Memorial Cure Clock, giving the Cures the power to purify the servants.
32	"Is This Magic? Homare is a Mermaid Princess!"; Transliteration: "Korette Mahō? Homare wa Ningyo no Purinsesu!" (Japanese: これって魔法？ほまれは人魚のプリンセス！)	September 16, 2018
Trapped inside Bishin's newest Mou-Oshimaida, Homare finds herself inside the story of The Little Mermaid formed from their hearts, where she is a mermaid who encounters a prince resembling Harry, who appears to have forgotten about her. As Homare uses a potion to turn herself into a human to see Harry, slowly realising her feelings for him, Bishin reveals that Harry allegedly already had a sweetheart, hoping to have Homare dissolve into seafoam. However, Homare is encouraged by the other Cures and breaks free of the world, deciding to keep her feelings, and what she learned, a secret.
33	"Be Careful! Cryase Corporation's Recruitment Activities!?"; Transliteration: "Yōchūi! Kuraiasu-sha no Saiyō Katsudō!?" (Japanese: 要注意！クライアス社の採用活動！？)	September 23, 2018
Emiru feels downhearted when a TV personality criticizes Twin Love's music as half-hearted. Meanwhile, Henri, who is practising for a performance, is approached by Cryase employee Listle, who wishes to scout him for Cryase Corp. When Emiru learns of this, Henri reveals he is scared of growing up due to the changes in his body, to which Emiru encourages Henri to love himself, reminding herself of the support the Ruru gives her. The next day, a TV producer who was scorned by Henri for his shady practises attempts to sabotage his performance by cutting the music, but Emiru and Ruru provide their own music, allowing him to complete his performance. Listle then attacks with a Mou-Oshimaida in order to try and recruit Henri, but he turns down his scouting offer, instead choosing to believe in the future. However, Henri is secretly hindered by a worsening foot injury, still making him a target for Cryase Corp.
34	"Detective Kotori! I'll Investigate My Big Sister!"; Transliteration: "Meitantei Kotori! Onee-chan o Chōsaseyo!" (Japanese: 名探偵ことり！お姉ちゃんを調査せよ！)	September 30, 2018
Curious about whether the monsters that the PreCure fight are because of Hana's clumsiness, Kotori ends up tagging alongside a couple of Hana's classmates, who are members of a Cure Yell Fan Club, as they look around town for Cure Yell. When a Mou-Oshimaida summoned by Gelos attacks, Hana comes to Kotori's rescue, reminding her of when Hana helped her when she was little. Gelos attempts to fuel the Mou-Oshimaida with her darkness, but Kotori and the fanboys manage to negate it with their Asu Power, allowing the Cures to win.
35	"The Light of Life! Saaya is a Doctor?"; Transliteration: "Inochi no Kagayaki! Saaya wa Oisha-san?" (Japanese: 命の輝き！さあやはお医者さん？)	October 7, 2018
To help further her acting, Saaya requests to work at a maternity ward with everyone. While there, Saaya meets a girl named Aya, whose mother is scheduled to give birth via a Caesarean section operation. As Saaya wonders how she can help Aya and her mother, she comforts Aya as she worries over whether her mother will stop being her mother when her brother is born, helping her to give her mother some encouragement before the operation. Dr. Traum attacks with a Mou-Oshimaida, but Saaya manages to defeat it, allowing Aya's brother to be safely delivered.
36	"Hooray Hooray! Legendary PreCure Assembled!!"; Transliteration: "Furefure! Densetsu no Purikyua Daishūgō!!" (Japanese: フレフレ！伝説のプリキュア大集合！！)	October 14, 2018
The Pretty Cures from both Witchy PreCure! and Kirakira PreCure a la Mode are attacked by Dr. Traum, whose new time-manipulating mech reverts them back to their younger selves. After the Hugtto PreCure force Traum to retreat, they learn that both Strawberry Hill and the Magic World have been frozen in time. Splitting into groups to find other Cures to help them, the girls manage to meet up with Love Momozono and Nozomi Yumehara before Traum arrives and uses time-powered Oshimaidas to stop time across the world.
37	"To the Future! PreCure All For You!"; Transliteration: "Mirai e! Purikyua Ōru Fō Yū!" (Japanese: 未来へ！プリキュア・オール・フォー・ユー！)	October 21, 2018
The Cures destroy the time-reversing mechanism on Traum's mech, only for him to use toge-power to transform it into a more powerful form. Just as Nagisa, Honoka, and Shiny Luminous, arrive to support the Cures, Traum goes out of control and traps them in a dark void. However, Hana's willpower and the support of all the fairies help to save them while also bringing together all of the other PreCure teams. With their combined strength, the Cures defeat Traum and restore time to the world.
38	"Charged with Happiness! Happy Halloween!"; Transliteration: "Shiawase Chāji! Happī Harowin!" (Japanese: 幸せチャージ！ハッピーハロウィン！)	October 28, 2018
As the town prepares for Halloween, the Cuers explain to Ruru and Harry what Halloween is all about, as the holiday doesn't exist in their time. Meanwhile, Listle approaches Daigan about rejoining Criasu, leading him to summon a Mou-Oshimaida on the day of the festival. Not wishing for the festival to be ruined, the Cures turn their battle against the enemy into a special show for everyone, bringing Daigan back to his senses.
39	"For Tomorrow...! Tomorrow with Everyone!"; Transliteration: "Ashita no Tame ni...! Minna de Tumorō!" (Japanese: 明日のために。。。！みんなでトゥモロー！)	November 11, 2018
The Cures suddenly find themselves in Harry's hometown in the future, where they are confronted by Listle. As Listle shows them a future stopped in time, a flashback reveals that Harry, Listle, and Bishin worked for Criasu in the hopes of curing a sickness that afflicted their friends, but were betrayed. Fuelled by hope for the future, Hugtan's Mirai Crystal changes into the Mother Heart Crystal, giving the Cures the power of a being known as Mother to beat back Listle. It is at this point that Hana sees a vision of a girl asking her to save the future. Just as everyone returns home, Dr. Traum shows up, claiming to be Ruru's father as he is the one who created her.
40	"Ruru's Father!? Amour is..." Transliteration: "Rūrū no Papa!? Amūru, Sore wa..." (Japanese: ルールーのパパ！？アムール、それは。。。)	November 18, 2018
Following Traum's explanation of Criasu's goals, Harry reveals that Hugtan is actually Precure from the future named Cure Tomorrow, who had expended Mother's power escaping into the past with him. Once Ruru feels conflicted over Traum trying to act like a father, Hana encourages her to ask why he named her Ruru Amour. Traum reveals that he had intended for Ruru to be a replacement for his lost daughter, but soon realized she was her own person. When Gelos attacks with a Mou Oshimaida, Traum steps in to protect Ruru, allowing the Cures to defeat it. Just as Ruru makes up with Traum, Emiru becomes distraught with the realisation that Ruru has to return to the future with Hug-tan and Harry.
41	"Emiru's Dream, Shout It From Your Soul!"; Transliteration: "Emiru no Yume, Souru ga Shauto suru no desu!" (Japanese: えみるの夢、ソウルがシャウトするのです！)	November 25, 2018
Emiru starts behaving oddly as she tries to suppress her feelings over Ruru. Things get worse when Emiru suddenly loses her voice, leading to both her and Ruru losing their Mirai Crystals. Emiru's grandfather, spurred on by Bishin, tries to stop Emiru from pursuing her singing career, but Masato stands up for her, encouraging to let out her true feelings. When this leads to Bishin summoning a Mou-Oshimaida from the grandfather's negative energy, Emiru manages to express her true feelings of wanting to be with Ruru, who promises to wait for her in the future. Regaining their Mirai Crystals as a result, the pair manage to defeat the Mou-Oshimaida, after which everyone else becomes open with their feelings of sadness as well. Meanwhile, Henri's ankle injury worsens, making his offer from Criasu more tempting.
42	"Yell's Switch-Off! This is My Support!!"; Transliteration: "Ēru no Kōkan! Kore ga Watashi no Ōen da!!" (Japanese: エールの交換！これが私の応援だ！！)	December 2, 2018
Homare notices Henri's injury, but Henri remains determined to persevere until the end of the junior tournament. However, Henri gets involved in a traffic accident, damaging his leg and leaving him unable to perform. As Henri falls into despair, Listle, whose mind has been wiped by Cry, manipulates him into giving into darkness and taking command of a Mou-Oshimaida. Receiving cheers from Hana and the others, Henri temporarily transforms into a PreCure named Cure Infini and helps the other Cures defeat the Mou-Oshimaida.
43	"The Shining Star's Loving Heart. Homare's Start."; Transliteration: "Kagayaku Hoshi no Koigokoro. Homare no Sutāto." (Japanese: 輝く星の恋心。ほまれのスタート。)	December 9, 2018
Conflicted by her feelings for Harry and his inevitable departure, Homare tries to distance herself from Harry to concentrate on the tournament. Meanwhile, Hana is again confronted by Cry, once again leaving her bewildered. Encouraged by her friends and family, Homare decides to work up the courage to confess to Harry, who tells her that he can't return her feelings. Saddened but relieved to get everything off her chest, Homare is able to give the best performance of her life and wins the gold. Bishin then attacks with a Mou Oshimaida, but he is quickly defeated by Homare's newfound hope for the future.
44	"On a Journey to My Finalized Dream! Saaya's Great Adventure!"; Transliteration: "Yume to Ketsudan no Tabi e! Saaya no Daibōken!" (Japanese: 夢と決断の旅へ！さあやの大冒険！)	December 16, 2018
Just as Saaya prepares to shoot a movie with Reira, Listle, whose heart has been taken by Cry, uses a device to trap everyone inside the world of the movie. As Saaya's internal struggles start to affect her acting, she gets some advice from Dr. Maki over how she chose to pursue a different dream from what she started. Receiving confidence, Saaya reveals that she intends to quit acting to pursue a career in medicine instead. Preying on Reira's sadness over this, Listle transforms her into a Mou-Oshimaida and has her kidnap Hugtan. Venturing inside the monster, Saaya manages to express her true feelings to Reira and rescue her. Afterwards, Hugtan ends up summoning Santa Claus out of nowhere.
45	"A Hug with Everyone! Merry Christmas☆"; Transliteration: "Minna de Hagutto! Merī Kurisumasu☆" (Japanese: みんなでＨＵＧっと！メリークリスマス☆)	December 23, 2018
The gang discover that Santa and his reindeer have caught a cold that is preventing them from delivering Christmas presents, inspiring Traum to provide the group with a mechanical reindeer to remedy the situation while also deepening his bond with Ruru. While Hana, Emiru, and Traum help Santa complete his deliveries, Ruru gets advice from Hana's family on how to cook. The next day, Gelos, fearing that her youthful beauty will disappear, uses Traum's time-stopping device to transform herself into a Mou-Oshimaida in an attempt to freeze time. Luckily, Gelos ceases her attack former servants show up to remind her what really matters as she allows the Cures to purify her. After Santa returns home, the gang hold a Christmas party where Ruru gives Traum some food as a symbol of family.
46	"Cry Appears Again! The Ideal Flower That Blooms Eternally"; Transliteration: "Kurai, Futatabi! Eien ni Saku Risō no Hana" (Japanese: クライ、ふたたび！永遠に咲く理想のはな)	January 6, 2019
On New Year's Day, Hana encounters Cry again, who claims that time stopping in the future was the result of people becoming consumed by the darkness in their hearts. The next day, Cry initiates his ultimate plan, placing his headquarters in town, stopping time, and summoning multiple Mou-Oshimaida. The Cures defeat the Mou-Oshimaida, but Cry transforms the headquarters into a monster and captures Hug-tan before sending Listle and Bishin to fight the Cures.
47	"The Final Battle! Take Back Everyone's Tomorrow!"; Transliteration: "Saishū Kessen! Minna no Ashita o Torimodosu!" (Japanese: 最終決戦！みんなの明日を取り戻す！)	January 13, 2019
Listle summons an army of Mou-Oshimadas to fight the Cures, but they are aided by Papple, Charalit, Dangan, and Traum. This encourages Harry to accept his inner monster and reach Listle, who in turn manages to reach Bishin's heart. The Cures then go on to confront Cry, who imprisons Hana in a cage and tortures the others in an attempt to break her spirit. Urging Hana not to give up, the Cures use all their strength to free Hana, who is left alone to face Cry.
48	"I Can Do Anything! I Can Be Anything! Hooray Hooray, Me!"; Transliteration: "Nandemo Dekiru! Nandemo Nareru! Furefure Watashi!" (Japanese: なんでもできる！なんでもなれる！フレフレわたし！)	January 20, 2019
Despite overwhelming odds, Hana remains firm in her support of having hope for the future, allowing her to rescue Hug-tan, revive the other Cures, and resume everyone's stopped time. Cry unleashes all of his power to transform himself into a demon, but everyone's cheers transforms them all into Pretty Cures, whose combined power manages to defeat it. Rushing inside the crumbling Criasu headquarters, they share some final words with Cry before he disappears.
49	"Embrace Your Shining Future"; Transliteration: "Kagayaku Mirai o Dakishimete" (Japanese: 輝く未来を抱きしめて)	January 27, 2019
As the girls spend their last together, a time machine Traum is working on suddenly becomes a Mou-Oshimaida, which the Cures defeat with the help of another Pretty Cure named Cure Star. Afterwards, the girls bid a tearful farewell to Harry, Hugtan, Ruru, and the others as they return to the future, promising to see each other again. Later, in 2030, Emiru finally meets Ruru as she is first booted up, while Hana, who is now the president of her own company, gives birth to a beautiful baby girl, Hagumi.

== See also ==
- Hug! Pretty Cure Futari wa Pretty Cure: All Stars Memories - An animated film based on the series.
- Pretty Cure Super Stars! - The second Pretty Cure Stars crossover film, which stars the Hugtto! PreCure.
