= Yōko Honna =

Japanese actress (born 1979)

- 本名 陽子
- Born: January 7, 1979 (age 47); Sōka, Saitama Prefecture, Japan
- Occupations: Actress; voice actress; singer
- Years active: 1986–present
- Agents: 81 Produce (former); Re-Max (current)
- Notable work: Pretty Cure series as Nagisa Misumi; Cluster Edge as Lina; Oh My Goddess! as Ere; Mobile Suit Gundam 00 as Sumeragi Lee Noriega; xxxHOLiC as Rin; Highschool of the Dead as Kyoko Hayashi
- Height: 161 cm (5 ft 3 in)
- Children: 2
- Musical career
- Genres: J-Pop; Anison
- Instrument: Vocals
- Years active: 1995–present
- Labels: Studio Ghibli Records (1995–1996); Geneon Universal (2007–)

Yōko Honna (本名 陽子, Honna Yōko; born January 7, 1979) is a Japanese actress, voice actress and singer from Sōka, Saitama Prefecture, Japan. She works at Re-Max, although she formerly worked at 81 Produce.

She is best known as the voice of Nagisa Misumi from the original Pretty Cure series, as well as Shizuku Tsukishima from Whisper of the Heart.

She married someone outside of the industry in 2014 and gave birth to a daughter in June 2015. In 2017, she announced her pregnancy with a second child, as well as sharing her experience of miscarriage sometime prior.

== Filmography ==
=== Anime ===
- Futari wa Pretty Cure (2004), Nagisa Misumi/Cure Black
- Agatha Christie no Meitantei Poirot to Marple (2004), Jane Grey – episodes 36-39
- Rockman.EXE Stream (2004), Maid D – episode 37
- Futari wa Pretty Cure Max Heart (2005), Nagisa Misumi/Cure Black
- Emma: A Victorian Romance (2005), Sarah
- Glass Mask (2005), Mina Sawatari, Troupe leader – episode 31
- Tide-Line Blue (2005), Chenresi
- To Heart 2 (2005), Freshman A – episode 3
- Cluster Edge (2005), Lina
- Oh My Goddess! (2005), Ere
- Ray (2006), Misato
- .hack//Roots (2006), Asta
- xxxHOLiC (2006), Rin – episode 2
- Koi suru Tenshi Angelique: Kokoro no Mezameru Toki (2006), Ange
- Koi suru Tenshi Angelique: Kagayaki no Ashita (2007), Ange
- Emma: A Victorian Romance Second Act (2007), Annie
- Mobile Suit Gundam 00 (2007), Sumeragi Lee Noriega
- Noramimi (2008), Merry – episode 11
- Mobile Suit Gundam 00 Second Season (2008), Sumeragi Lee Noriega
- Hanamaru Kindergarten (2010), Sakura
- Highschool of the Dead (2010), Kyoko Hayashi
- Karneval (2013), Eva
- Happiness Charge PreCure (2014), Nagisa Misumi/Cure Black (ep 1)
- Space Patrol Luluco (2016), Lalaco Godspeed
- Listeners (2020), Wendy
- The Idaten Deities Know Only Peace (2021), Brandy

=== Original video animation ===
- Gunbuster 2 (2004), Nyan Nok Cham
- Sakura Taisen: New York NY. (2007), Yoshino Anri

=== Film ===
- Only Yesterday (1991), Taeko Okajima (5th grade)
- Whisper of the Heart (1995), Shizuku Tsukishima, Theme Song Performance
- The Cat Returns (2002), Chika
- Futari wa Pretty Cure Max Heart (2005), Nagisa Misumi/Cure Black
- Futari wa Precure Max Heart 2: Yukizora no Tomodachi (2005), Nagisa Misumi/Cure Black
- Pretty Cure All Stars film series (2009-2016), Nagisa Misumi/Cure Black
- Mobile Suit Gundam 00 The Movie: A wakening of the Trailblazer (2010), Sumeragi Lee Noriega
- Hugtto! PreCure Futari wa Pretty Cure: All Stars Memories (2018), Nagisa Misumi/Cure Black
- My Hero Academia The Movie: World Heroes' Mission (2021), Claire Voyance
- Pretty Cure All Stars F (2023), Nagisa Misumi/Cure Black

=== Drama CD ===
- Karneval (2010), Eva

=== Video games ===
- Panzer Dragoon Orta (2002), Orta
- Fushigi Yūgi: Suzaku Ibun (2008), Soi
- Tatsunoko vs. Capcom: Cross Generation of Heroes (2008, Wii), Saki Omokane
- 2nd Super Robot Wars Z (2011–2012), Sumeragi Lee Noriega
- Super Robot Wars UX (2013), Sumeragi Lee Noriega
- Persona 4: Dancing All Night (2015), Tomoe Sayama
- Milihime Taisen (2015), Reverberi, Cazzago

Tales of symphonia: Knights of Ratatosk, Aqua

=== Drama ===
- Shin Ōedo Sōsamō (1984) – episode 25
- MegaBeast Investigator Juspion (1985) – episode 13
- The Unfettered Shogun II (1986) – episode 170
- You Who Wears the Bride's Costume (1986)
- Hidden Relationship (1986)
- Kamen Rider Black (1987), Yuki – episode 32
- Wakadaisho Tenka Exemption! (1987), Chie – episode 1
- Zenigata Heiji (1987), Ochiyo – episode 17
- I'm Going to Yoshi! (1987), Momoko
- Animal Street Dream Land (1987) – episodes 17 and 25
- Fuun Edo Castle Raging General Tokugawa Iemitsu (1987), Aya

1988 Kamen Rider BLACK RX (Episode 9) --Chinese Koizumi Nanbu Nose Magari (NHK / Short Drama Series Furusato) --Satoko Trade (Toshiba Sunday Theater 1630th) 1989 Dennou Keisatsu Cybercop (Episode 26) --Yukari Choshichiro Edo Diary 2nd Series Episode 44 "Girl's Cry" (NTV Union Motion Picture) --Shizuka Fujiki Mistress's street! (TBS / Saturday drama special) Enthusiastic era special A man who calls a storm (NTV, Wednesday Grand Romance) 1990 Don't touch the thief! (Episode 3) --Kiyo Mita Special Rescue Police Winspector (Episode 17) --Miki Takaoka Naked General Wandering Episode 44 "The Bride of Qing and Bengara" (Kansai TV) --Machiko Goto (Student of Fukiya Elementary School) [42] 1991 Abare Hasshu Gojo Journey 2nd Series Episode 3 "568 Namida Journey" (TV Tokyo Union Motion Picture) Choshichiro Edo Diary 3rd Series Episode 11 "Scratch" (NTV Union Motion Picture) --Ochika Special Rescue Order Solbrain (Episode 2) --Yuka Mizusawa Representative Director Detective (Episode 38) --Kozue 1993 Hagure Detective Junjou School PART6 (Episode 15) "Frightened Photographs, A Woman Standing in a Classroom at Night"—Asuka Wada 2006 Police Department Investigation Division 1 Section 9 season1 (Episode 8) --Maki

=== Dubbing ===
==== Live-action ====
- Always Shine, Beth (Caitlin FitzGerald))
- The Amazing Spider-Man, Gwen Stacy (Emma Stone)
- The Amazing Spider-Man 2, Gwen Stacy (Emma Stone)
- Battleship, Samantha Shane (Brooklyn Decker)
- The Cabin in the Woods, Dana Polk (Kristen Connolly)
- The Counselor, Laura (Penélope Cruz)
- A Dangerous Man, Tia (Marlaina Mah)
- The Dark Crystal (Blu-Ray edition), Kira (Lisa Maxwell)
- Dark Shadows, Victoria Winters (Bella Heathcote)
- Dear John, Savannah Lynn Curtis (Amanda Seyfried)
- Desperate Housewives, Julie Mayer (Andrea Bowen)
- Genius, Françoise Gilot (Clémence Poésy)
- The Gifted, the Frost Sisters (Skyler Samuels)
- Girls of the Sun, Bahar (Golshifteh Farahani)
- The Handmaid's Tale, June Osborne (Elisabeth Moss)
- The House with a Clock in Its Walls, Mrs. Barnavelt (Lorenza Izzo)
- IF, Pop
- Into the Wild, Carine McCandless (Jena Malone)
- The Invisible Man, Cecilia Kass (Elisabeth Moss)
- The Kitchen, Claire Walsh (Elisabeth Moss)
- My New Sassy Girl, Sassy (Victoria Song)
- Pitch Perfect (film series), Aubrey Posen (Anna Camp)
- Pretty Little Liars, Alison DiLaurentis (Sasha Pieterse)
- The Sapphires, Julie (Jessica Mauboy)
- Season of the Witch, Anna (Claire Foy)
- Shinjuku Incident, Lily (Fan Bingbing)
- The Sisterhood of the Traveling Pants, Bailey Graffman (Jenna Boyd)
- The Stand, Frannie Goldsmith (Odessa Young)
- Suits, Katrina Bennett (Amanda Schull)
- Take Me Home Tonight, Tori Frederking (Teresa Palmer)
- Yellowjackets, Shauna (Melanie Lynskey)

==== Animation ====
- Atomic Betty, Atomic Betty
- Love, Death & Robots, Juliet Burton
- Wonder Park, June's mother

== Discography ==
=== Singles ===
No.	Release date	Title	Identification number	Chart position	Album
1	June 25, 1995	Country Road (カントリー・ロード Kantori Roodo)	TKDA-70642	22	friends~Friends~
2	June 5, 1996	Future Door (未来のドア Mirai no Doa)	TKDA-70871		friends~Friends~

=== Albums ===
No.	Release date	Title	Identification number	Chart position
1	July 22, 1996	friends~Friends~ (friends〜フレンズ〜 friends~Furenzu~)	TKCA-70947	

=== Mini albums ===
No.	Release date	Title	Identification number	Chart position
1	August 27, 2008	true self	GNCA-7118	
2	June 24, 2009	Fiore	GBCA-7131	
