= Nagisa Misumi =

- Pretty Cure character
- From left-to-right: Cure Black (Max Heart), Nagisa Misumi and Cure Black (original)
- First appearance: Pretty Cure (episode 1; 2004)
- Created by: Toei Animation
- Designed by: Akira Inagami
- Voiced by: Yoko Honna

In-universe information
- Aliases: Cure Black; Natalie Blackstone (English dub)
- Species: Human
- Gender: Female
- Occupation: Middle school student Pretty Cure
- Relatives: Takashi Misumi (father); Rie Misumi (mother); Ryouta Misumi (younger brother)
- Nationality: Japanese

Nagisa Misumi (Japanese: 美墨 なぎさ, Hepburn: Misumi Nagisa) is the protagonist of the 2004 anime series Pretty Cure and its 2005 sequel, Pretty Cure Max Heart. She is a lacrosse player and second-year student at Verone Academy. At the beginning of the series, she becomes the caretaker of the fairy Mepple, who is from the Garden of Light, and gains the power to transform into Cure Black (キュアブラック, Kyua Burakku).

Nagisa is the first Cure in the Pretty Cure franchise, and as such, is one of the most recognizable characters in the series. Her popularity with audiences led to protagonists in future Pretty Cure series being directly based on her, including Saki Hyuuga/Cure Bloom of PreCure Splash Star and Hibiki Houjou/Cure Melody of Suite PreCure.

== Profile ==
Nagisa is a 14/15-year-old teenage girl with fair skin, dark ginger hair, and hazel eyes. She usually wears Verone Academy's female school uniform, which consists of a red blazer worn over a dark red shirt with a white undershirt, a blue striped bow, and a teal plaid skirt, along with black socks and brown loafers. Her casual outfit consists of a black and white raglan shirt under a pink short-sleeved jacket and a red miniskirt with a pouch in which she carries her Card Commune, along with pink knee-length socks and black and white sneakers. Her birthday is October 10.

Nagisa is hot-headed and passionate about sports, as she plays lacrosse, and food, but does not care for studying. This personality is contrasted with her Pretty Cure partner, Honoka Yukishiro, who is more reserved and studious. Her catchphrase is "Unbelievable!" (ありえな～い！, Arienai!)

Nagisa's Card Commune, in addition to housing her fairy mascot Mepple, grants her powers as a Pretty Cure. As Cure Black, she wears a black top with white ruffles and a white bow on the front, a pink belt, black shorts with a black overskirt, black arm warmers with white trimming and pink heart charms on the fists, and brown shoes with black leg warmers. In Max Heart, the outfit gained extra ruffles and a longer top, due to complaints from parents about her top exposing her midriff. Cure Black's main powers are super strength, and alongside Cure White, lightning powers, which are used in their dual attack Marble Screw.

== English dub ==
In the English dub of Pretty Cure, Nagisa's name is changed to Natalie Blackstone, and she is voiced by Rocio Barahona. Her catchphrase is changed to "Give me a break!".

== Other appearances ==
Cure Black made cameos in HappinessCharge PreCure! and Soaring Sky! PreCure to celebrate the franchise's 10th and 20th anniversary.

In HUG! Pretty Cure, Nagisa, alongside Honoka, is summoned by Hugtan. Later on, she battles Doctor Traum along with all the other Cures in the franchise up to that point.

== Appearances ==
- Pretty Cure (2004–2005) - Main protagonist
- Pretty Cure Max Heart (2005–2006) - Main protagonist
- Happiness Charge PreCure! (2014–2015) - Guest appearance
- HUG! Pretty Cure (2018–2019) - Guest appearance
- Soaring Sky! PreCure (2023–2024) - Guest appearance
- Wonderful Precure! (2024) - Guest appearance

== Reception ==
In a 2019 survey conducted by the NHK, Cure Black was ranked first place through 613,524 votes.

In a 2023 poll of which Pretty Cure was most popular with viewers, Cure Black ranked seventh place with 393 votes out of 15,941 votes.
