= List of Kirakira Pretty Cure a la Mode episodes =

Kirakira Pretty Cure

- Season 14
- Last Japanese DVD Disc volume released by Marvelous AQL, featuring the main Cures and Mascots
- No. of episodes: 49

Release
- Original network: ANN (ABC)
- Original release: February 5, 2017 – January 28, 2018

Series chronology
- ← Previous; Witchy PreCure! Next → Hug! PreCure

Kirakira Pretty Cure a la Mode is the fourteenth anime television series in Izumi Todo's Pretty Cure franchise, produced by Asahi Broadcasting Corporation and Toei Animation. The series follows Ichika Usami and her friends, who become Pretty Cures to protect the Kirakiraru residing in sweets from the evil Kirakiraru Thieves and other villains. The series aired on all ANN networks in Japan between February 5, 2017, and January 28, 2018, succeeding Witchy Pretty Cure! in its timeslot and was succeeded by Hug! Pretty Cure. The opening theme is "SHINE!! Kirakira ☆ PreCure a la Mode" (SHINE!!キラキラ☆プリキュアアラモード, SHINE!! Kirakira ☆ Purikyua Ara Mōdo) by Yuri Komagata, while the ending theme for the first 22 episodes is "Let's La Cooking☆Showtime" (レッツ・ラ・クッキン☆ショータイム, Rettsu Ra Kukkin ☆ Shōtaimu) by Kanako Miyamoto. From episode 23 onward, the ending theme is "Shubidubi☆Sweets Time" (シュビドゥビ☆スイーツタイム, Shubidubi ☆ Suītsu Taimu) by Miyamoto. Crunchyroll began streaming the series internationally in August 2020.

== Episode list ==
No.	Title (Note: All English titles are taken from Crunchyroll.)	Original release date
1	"Full of Love! Cure Whip, Ready to Serve!"; Transliteration: "Daisuki Tappuri! Kyua Hoippu Dekiagari!" (Japanese: 大好きたっぷり！キュアホイップできあがり！)	February 5, 2017
As Ichika Usami returns home to prepare a cake for her mother, a strange cream-filled explosion occurs nearby, and she and four other girls see visions of sweets. While struggling to cook, Ichika encounters a fairy named Pekorin, who tells her of the Kirakiraru residing in sweets and helps her bake a cake. However, Ichika becomes saddened when she learns her mother can't make it home and loses the motivation to finish her cake. Suddenly, an evil fairy named Gummy appears and starts stealing the Kirakiraru from inside the cakes to make himself stronger, causing the cakes to turn black. Pekorin is determined to protect the cake that Ichika put her feelings into and helps Ichika to realize her cake isn't pointless. As Ichika finishes decorating it, the cake transforms into a Sweets Pact and the Rabbit Shortcake Animal Sweet, giving her the power to transform into the Pretty Cure, Cure Whip. Using her new rabbit-like abilities, Ichika manages to defeat Gummy and reclaim the Kirakiraru he stole, but then hears a strange voice coming from a shop-shaped bag.
2	"The Little Genius, Cure Custard!"; Transliteration: "Chīsa na Tensai Kyua Kasutādo!" (Japanese: 小さな天才キュアカスタード！)	February 12, 2017
The bag transforms into a full-sized bakery with a kitchen and Ichika meets a fairy spirit known as the Elder. Upon hearing that the Pretty Cure were legendary patissiers, Ichika is excited at the chance to be one. The next day, she encounters her shy classmate, Himari Arisugawa, and invites her to the bakery to make pudding. Irritated by Ichika's repeated failures, Himari ends up bringing out her true nature as a sweets expert and lectures Ichika about pudding. Having previously lost friends over her excessive knowledge, Himari becomes fearful that Ichika will leave her. However, she is surprised that Ichika is interested in learning about pudding, and together they make a pudding dish. Just then, Pulupulu, a member of the Kirakiraru Thieves, starts stealing Kirakiraru from puddings and targets Himari's squirrel pudding. As Ichika transforms to fight Pulupulu but struggles against his pudding body, Himari's desire to protect her new friend grants her the power to transform into Cure Custard, and she uses her speed to help Ichika defeat Pulupulu.
3	"Roar, Lion! Cure Gelato!"; Transliteration: "Sakebe Raion! Kyua Jerāto!" (Japanese: 叫べライオン！キュアジェラート！)	February 19, 2017
Aoi Tategami, the lead vocalist of the band Wild Azur, becomes eager to enter a Battle of the Bands contest and impress one of her favorite musicians, Ayane Misaki. As she struggles to write lyrics for a new song, Ichika tries to cheer her up with some ice cream, but learns that the ice-cream truck had been robbed by one of the Kirakiraru Thieves, Hotto. Taking inspiration from the clouds in the sky, Ichika works with Himari to make a Lion ice cream for Aoi on the day of the contest, reminding her of why she started singing in the first place. As Aoi's performance is about to begin, Hotto appears, prompting Ichika and Himari into action. Her determination to protect her stage and her ice cream allows Aoi to transform into Cure Gelato, who uses her ice powers and lion's roar to defeat Hotto. Despite the audience having fled out of fear, Aoi manages to bring them back with her song, impressing Ayane with lyrics from her heart.
4	"Three Girls United! Let's La Mix-it-Up!"; Transliteration: "Sannin Sorotte Rettsu Ra Maze Maze!" (Japanese: 3人そろってレッツ・ラ・まぜまぜ！)	February 26, 2017
Wanting to do something for ballet star Mariko Himukai, Ichika, Himari, and Aoi try to make cream puffs for her recital but struggles to do so. After asking Mariko for advice on what to do when met with repeated failures, Ichika is told to focus on the feelings of love that inspired them. After all three girls end up thinking about each other, they return to the kitchen and manage to create a successful batch of cream puffs, becoming closer friends as a result. The next morning, another member of the Kirakiraru Thieves, Choucrea, targets the girls' cream puffs, but the Cures manage to defeat him by combining their feelings. After giving Mariko the Swan Cream Puff they made, the girls pass by a beautiful high school girl.
5	"That Capricious Young Lady is Cure Macaron!"; Transliteration: "Kimagure Onee-sama wa Kyua Makaron!" (Japanese: きまぐれお姉さまはキュアマカロン！)	March 5, 2017
Ichika meets the girl from before, Yukari Kotozume, who is known for being beautiful and talented. After spending some time together, she invites Yukari, who doesn't seem to be enjoying herself, to make macarons with everyone. Despite Yukari's natural talent, they discover that the taste isn't right, prompting Yukari to work hard to replicate it, finally enjoying herself in the process. After Ichika turns one of Yukari's failures into a Cat Macaron, another member of the Kirakiraru Thieves, Maquillon, arrives to steal it. Finding enjoyment from being with Ichika, Yukari gains the power to transform into Cure Macaron and defeat Maquillon. As she becomes determined to one day make perfect macarons, Ichika falls for the handsome Akira Kenjo, who has recently moved into the neighborhood.
6	"Is This Love!? The Glorious Cure Chocolat!"; Transliteration: "Korette Rabu!? Kareinaru Kyua Shokora!" (Japanese: これってラブ！？華麗なるキュアショコラ！)	March 12, 2017
As Ichika finds herself falling in love with Akira, the others encourage her to escort Akira to a chocolate shop. As Akira explains that the chocolate is for their sickly sister, Miku, another member of the Kirakiraru Thieves, Bitard, appears and steals the chocolate, along with the Kirakiraru of the town's chocolate. Ichika decides to use the chocolate Akira had bought her to make Dog Chocolates for Miku. As the Cures protect this batch from Bitard, Akira's determination to protect the chocolates Ichika made for Miku awakens the power to transform into Cure Chocolat. After Bitard is defeated and the chocolates are delivered to Miku, Ichika is shocked to discover that Akira is actually a girl.
7	"Pekorin Makes Donuts peko~!" Transliteration: "Pekorin, Dōnatsu Tsukuru peko~!" (Japanese: ペコリン、ドーナツ作るペコ～！)	March 19, 2017
The Elder tells the girls about how Pekorin used to bake alongside her friends atop the Strawberry Mountain until Gummy and his gang attacked, causing an explosion that separated Pekorin from her friends and left the Elder in a ghost-like state. Pekorin is upset at these memories, so Ichika decides to cheer her up by making doughnuts with her. Upon taking their completed doughnuts to the top of Strawberry Mountain, where the Elder's bakery once was, Ichika is shown visions of the fun times Pekorin spent baking with her friends. Just then, they are attacked by another of the Gummy Gang, Fueru, who has the power to divide himself, but is defeated through the Cures' combined efforts. Inspired by the visions she saw, Ichika decides to convert the bakery into a shop where everyone can enjoy sweets together, naming it the Kirakira Patisserie.
8	"The KiraPâti's Opening... Isn't Happening!"; Transliteration: "KiraPati Ōpun... Dekimasen!" (Japanese: キラパティオープン...できません！)	March 26, 2017
As Ichika and the others prepare the Kirakira Patisserie for its opening, the Elder shows them the Kirakiraru Pot, allowing them to make objects out of Kirakiraru to decorate the shop. Despite this, the girls still struggle with their individual tasks. Just then, a girl named Emiru Kodama comes to the shop, looking to buy sweets for her friends that have different tastes. As the other girls work together to prepare the shop, Ichika gets the idea to make an animal sweets cake for Emiru. However, another member of the Kirakiraru Thieves, Spongen, appears and steals the cake's Kirakiraru, but the Cures are able to defeat him and restore the cake to normal. Afterwards, Ichika officially opens the Kirakira Patisserie, where Emiru brings all of her friends.
9	"The KiraPâti Will Make Your Love Come True!"; Transliteration: "KiraPati ga Anata no Koi, Kanae masu!" (Japanese: キラパティがあなたの恋、叶えます！)	April 2, 2017
As the Patisserie tries out various locations to attract customers, they come across a man named Daisuke Tatsumi, who wants to confess his love to his childhood friend, Midori Nakamura. Wanting to help Daisuke out, Ichika and the others make cookies to give him some encouragement. However, another member of the Kirakiraru Thieves, Cookacookie, appear to steal the cookies, but the Cures are able to defeat him. Despite the cookies being damaged in the process, Daisuke works up the courage to confess to Midori, with the girls helping to set the mood.
10	"Yukari vs. Akira! A Tempestuous Errand!"; Transliteration: "Yukari tai Akira! Arashi o Yobu Otsukai!" (Japanese: ゆかりVSあきら！嵐を呼ぶおつかい！)	April 9, 2017
Wanting to take part in the local Sweets Festival, Ichika sends Yukari and Akira to buy fruit to make a fruit tart. As Yukari and Akira struggle to find fruit, Yukari helps a young girl pick out a mature brooch, while Akira helps an old lady find an emerald that came off her wedding ring. Just then, Yukari and Akira are dragged away by their respective fan clubs, who believe the patisserie is an unfitting place for them. Meanwhile, another member of the Kirakiraru Thieves, Tarton, attacks Ichika and the others as they are making the tart base. Ignoring the advice of their peers to stay away from each other, Yukari and Akira aid their fellow Cures in defeating Tarton before finally buying the fruit needed to complete Ichika's tart. As the completed Hedgehog Tart manages to win over the girls' respective fan clubs, a masked figure sets his sights on the Sweets Festival.
11	"Showdown! Pretty Cure vs. the Gummy Gang!"; Transliteration: "Kessen! Purikyua tai Gamī Shūdan!" (Japanese: 決戦！プリキュアVSガミー集団！)	April 16, 2017
The Sweets Festival begins, with the Kirakira Patisserie's Hedgehog Tart proving to be a big hit with customers, but Ichika is embarrassed when her father Genichiro shows up. Just then, Gummy and his gang attack the festival, and a masked boy fuses them into a single powerful enemy that overpowers the Cures. When Gummy attacks Genichiro, who had bought a strawberry shortcake for Ichika and her friends, the Kirakiraru in everyone's hearts combine into the Pretty Cure's new weapon, the Candy Rods, allowing them to defeat Gummy's group and break the belts that were controlling them.
12	"The Enemy is... The Popular Exchange Student!?"; Transliteration: "Teki wa... Motemote Tenkōsei!?" (Japanese: 敵は...モテモテ転校生！？)	April 23, 2017
A boy named Rio Kuroki transfers into Ichika's class, taking interest in her, and quickly becomes popular with the other students. Later that day, Gummy and the others appear at the patisserie and explain how they became evil because of the belts given to them by the masked boy, apologizing to the girls and learning the joy of eating sweets instead of stealing Kirakiraru. The next day, Ichika invites Rio and her friend Risa to the patisserie as she makes Sheep Cupcakes, receiving some useful advice from Rio despite him claiming to dislike sweets. However, Rio is revealed to be the masked boy known as Julio and steals the Kirakiraru from Risa's heart after she eats the cupcakes, using it to create a dark sword. As Julio's hatred of sweets increases the power of his attacks, Ichika uses the whipping technique she learned from Rio to block his attacks, allowing the Cures to revert the black Kirakiraru in his weapon to normal.
13	"Can't Do It! Himari's Unexpected Debut!"; Transliteration: "Murimuri! Himari, Masaka no Debyū!" (Japanese: ムリムリ！ひまり、まさかのデビュー！)	April 30, 2017
Ichika, Aoi, and Himari are chosen to help create videos to promote the shopping district, but Himari struggles because of her shyness. As the videos fail to garner views, Rio suggests to Himari that they use the Pretty Cure to promote the videos, increasing her worries. As Ichika moves the shoot to the patisserie for a change of pace, Himari, recalling what sparked her interest in the science behind food, works up the courage to tell a mother and daughter why churros have their unique shape. Just then, Julio appears and steals their Kirakiraru, using it to create a dark bow and arrow. Wanting to protect the feelings from wanting to learn more about sweets, Himari uses a new technique to stop Julio's arrows, allowing the Cures to destroy the weapon and return the Kirakiraru to its owners. Thanks to Himari's newly gained confidence, the PR videos are successful.
14	"Rich Girl Rock 'n' Roll!"; Transliteration: "Ojō-sama Rokkunrōru!" (Japanese: お嬢さまロックンロール！)	May 7, 2017
Aoi is suddenly dragged away from her band performance by a butler named Mizushima. Upon going to Aoi's house to investigate, the girls learn that she is the daughter of a rich family, who want her to quit and the patisserie to become a refined lady. Wanting to help Aoi, Ichika and the others sneak into the household's dinner party to hand out Dolphin Jelly to the guests and give Aoi the chance to put on a performance and tell Mizushima her feelings. As Mizushima remains reluctant to share his true feelings, Julio appears and uses the guests' Kirakiraru to create a dark spear. After discovering that her song had reached Mizushima's heart, Aoi uses the strength of his Kirakiraru to overpower Julio and destroy his weapon. Afterwards, Aoi manages to convince Mizushima to let her continue with both the band and the patisserie.
15	"For the Sake of Love! The Angry Cure Chocolat!"; Transliteration: "Ai Yueni! Ikari no Kyua Shokora!" (Japanese: 愛ゆえに！怒りのキュアショコラ！)	May 14, 2017
Akira's little sister, Miku, visits the patisserie to help out there, but struggles to do so. While shopping with Ichika, Miku explains she wants to do something for Akira in return for the chocolates she gives her. Working with the others, Miku makes Akira a poodle-shaped chocolate cake to show her she wants to protect her smile. Just then, Julio steals Miku's Kirakiraru to create a dark trident. As Akira is overwhelmed by anger, she gains power from the feelings she received from Miku's cake and turns the battle in her favor to defeat Julio.
16	"A Dangerously Sudden Approach! Yukari and Rio!"; Transliteration: "Kiken na Kyūsekkin! Yukari to Rio!" (Japanese: キケンな急接近！ゆかりとリオ！)	May 21, 2017
Wanting to know how Rio is knowledgeable about others, Yukari invites him and the girls to her family's teahouse to practice tea ceremonies with her grandmother. After watching Rio copy her tea making techniques perfectly, Yukari tells Rio about the struggles of being an older sister. Inspired by Yukari's tea service, Ichika decides to turn the patisserie into an aquarium-themed teahouse serving White Whale Strawberry Daifuku, helping Yukari to realize she enjoys tea ceremonies. Later that day, Yukari discovers Julio has targeted her fangirls to lure her into a battle. As Julio attempts to weaken Yukari's spirit by teasing her about her sister, Yukari reveals that she lied to trick Julio into revealing his true identity. After destroying his weapon, Yukari notices something amiss about Rio's behavior when he made tea, while Julio sets his sights on Ichika.
17	"The Final Experiment! Cure Whip Can't Transform!"; Transliteration: "Saigo no Jikken! Henshin Dekinai Kyua Hoippu!" (Japanese: 最後の実験！変身できないキュアホイップ！)	May 28, 2017
Realizing that Yukari will expose his identity, Rio approaches Ichika, who wants to make cookies for her mother. Angered by Ichika's unconditional love for her mother, Rio steals Ichika's Kirakiraru and turns it into a Dark Candy Rod, leaving her devoid of love and unable to transform. As the other Cures fight Julio and he uses their own moves against them, Pekorin decides to help Ichika make cookies and remember the love of sweets she received from her mother. Upon receiving large amounts of Kirakiraru from completing her cookies, Ichika regains her ability to transform and fights against Julio, finally overpowering him. As Julio runs off, stating his hatred for sweets, another girl watches from above.
18	"The Source of the Rumors is the Powerful Bibly!"; Transliteration: "Uwasa no Nushi wa Kyōteki Biburī!" (Japanese: ウワサの主は強敵ビブリー！)	June 4, 2017
The girls discover that someone is spreading rumors about the Kirakira Patisserie, causing it to lose customers. This is revealed to be the work of Julio's ally, Bibly, who is using her doll Iru to spread rumors claiming bad things will happen if you visit the patisserie. Ichika is depressed about the absence of customers, which worsens after she hears about a successful patissier prodigy named Ciel Kirahoshi. The next day, she is surprised to see the girls promoting the patisserie despite the rumors, and is inspired to make Giraffe Mille Crépes and hold a grand reopening. As the taste of sweets manages to overcome the rumors, Bibly has Iru steal the nearby Kirakiraru to bring back to her master, Noir. However, the Cures manage to stop Iru before he can escape and recover the Kirakiraru. As Bibly retreats and business for the Kirakira Patisserie returns to normal, Ciel arrives in Japan.
19	"The Pâtissier Prodigy! Ciel Kirahoshi!"; Transliteration: "Tensai Patishie! Kirahoshi Shieru!" (Japanese: 天才パティシエ！キラ星シエル！)	June 11, 2017
Ciel opens a pop-up restaurant in Ichika's hometown, which quickly becomes popular. Ichika requests to become Ciel's apprentice, and she tasks her with creating a dish that represents who she is. While her dish fails to meet Ciel's standards, Ichika appreciates the effort Ciel puts into her sweets to make others happy. Bibly and Iru once again attempt to steal the Kirakiraru from Ciel's sweets, but Ichika and the Cures manage to stop them, and Ciel is delighted to learn that the Pretty Cure exist.
20	"Admiration Mix-It-Up! Ichika and Ciel!"; Transliteration: "Akogare Maze Maze! Ichika to Shieru!" (Japanese: 憧れまぜまぜ！いちかとシエル！)	June 25, 2017
Ichika, Himari, and Aoi are tasked with accompanying Ciel for a day-long interview, with Ichika determined to become Ciel's apprentice. While searching for ingredients at the Strawberry Mountain, Ichika notices that Ciel seems familiar with the area and is aware of the legendary patissiéres. Upon arriving at a bee hive factory, the taste of honey gets everyone in the mood for making pancakes, leading to a cook-off between Ichika and Ciel. However, they are interrupted by Bibly and Iru, who steal the Kirakiraru from Ciel's pancakes and capture Ciel, but the Cures are able to defeat them. Afterwards, Ciel is curious why Ichika's seemingly ordinary bear pancakes contain so much Kirakiraru.
21	"Say What?! Ciel's Identity Revealed!"; Transliteration: "Nandesuto~!? Akasareru Shieru no Shōtai!" (Japanese: なんですと～！？明かされるシエルの正体！)	July 2, 2017
While becoming curious about Ciel after she mentions Kirakiraru, Ichika sees some strange ghostly figures, prompting the Elder to send out a signal at Strawberry Mountain. Gummy and his reformed allies help the fairies that had been scattered as a result of the Kirararu Thieves' attack to return home. As Ichika and the others hold a cooking party to welcome everyone back, Ciel appears and reveals herself to be a fairy named Kirarin. Just then, Bibly attacks and attempts to steal the Kirakiraru, using her own dark Kirakiraru to power Iru up, but is defeated. However, they are then approached by Julio, who has received dark power from Noir.
22	"Stop It, Julio! The Kirakiraru of Hatred!"; Transliteration: "Yamete Jurio! Nikushimi no Kirakiraru!" (Japanese: やめてジュリオ！憎しみのキラキラル！)	July 9, 2017
Julio uses the dark Kirakiraru within him to power up his Dark Rod and repel the Cures' attacks. Ciel recognises him as her twin brother, Pikario, who launches an attack that causes the girls to fall into a cave filled with Kirakiraru. Ciel explains how she studied in France with Pikario, until one day he declared he hated sweets and disappeared. As Julio resumes his attack, he expresses resentment towards Ciel for having more talent as a patissier and a Pretty Cure and not recognizing his feelings, which led Noir to turn him to evil. Sensing that the real Julio is somewhere amidst the darkness, Ichika has the other Cures power her up so she can withstand Julio's attacks and understand his true feelings, and is able to return him to normal as Pikario. As Ciel laments being unable to her brother, the other fairies discover a mysterious shrine in the cave.
23	"Fly! The Rainbow Pegasus, Cure Parfait!"; Transliteration: "Tobe! Niji-iro Pegasasu, Kyua Parufe!" (Japanese: 翔べ！虹色ペガサス、キュアパルフェ！)	July 16, 2017
As the girls question Pikario about Noir's ambitions, Ciel falls into depression over not recognizing Pikario's feelings. Her guilt increases when Pikario reveals everything he tries to make is drained of Kirakiraru. Noir appears to tempt Ciel towards darkness, trapping her, Ichika, and Pikario in a barrier formed from the self-loathing in her heart. When the other Cures try to save them, Noir fuses Bibly and Iru together to hold them off. Upon reaching a kitchen inside Ciel's heart, Ichika encourages Pikario to make her waffles, which regain their Kirakiraru from his feelings towards her and restore her happiness. Having rediscovered her passion for making sweets, Ciel begins making sweets from both the Cures' Kirakiraru and Pikario's waffles. Noir attacks Ciel, but Pikario guards Ciel and encourages her to complete the Pegasus Parfait Animal Sweet. Upon doing so, Ciel is able to transform into Cure Parfait and defeat Bibly. However, Pikario is severely wounded and taken to the ancient shrine to heal.
24	"The Transfer Student is the Fairy Kirarin!?"; Transliteration: "Tenkōsei wa Yōsei Kirarin!?" (Japanese: 転校生は妖精キラリン！？)	July 23, 2017
As Pikario is healing at the shrine, it bestows mysterious crystals to each of the Cures. Wanting to learn more about Ichika and the others, Ciel transfers into Ichika's class, but trouble soon occurs when her hunger causes her to revert to her fairy form (Kirarin) in front of her classmates. Ichika and the others help Kirarin escape by putting her into a box and bring her back to her human form. Meanwhile, another of Noir's servants, Grave, appears to steal the town's Kirakiraru, summoning monsters named "Nendos" to attack the Cures. Cure Parfait manages to defeat the monster with the Cures' help, but becomes hungry and reverts to her fairy form shortly after. She later joins the girls as an official member of the Kirakira Patisserie.
25	"A Whirlwind Marriage?! Princess Yukari!"; Transliteration: "Dengeki Kekkon!? Purinsesu Yukari!" (Japanese: 電撃結婚！？プリンセスゆかり！)	July 30, 2017
Nata, a prince from the Duchy of Confeito, arrives and asks for Yukari's hand in marriage, wanting to take her back to his country. He believes that Akira is Yukari's boyfriend, but he is unaware that Akira is a girl. He has her partake in several challenges to decide who is best suited to be Yukari's prince. As Yukari seems to react harshly to Akira's uncertainty, Ciel tells Akira to be more direct with her feelings towards Yukari and encourages both of them to make chocolate macarons for a sweets-making contest. While going to deliver them, Yukari reveals that she acts coldly to hide her own weaknesses. Just then, another servant of Noir named Elysio attacks Nata and knocks away Yukari's Sweets Pact, and Akira fights him alone. Despite struggling against Elysio's attacks, Akira's feelings of love towards Yukari help her to break free, and the other Cures arrive to help defeat Elysio's plant monster. Afterwards, Yukari turns down Nata's offer and decides to stay with Akira and the others.
26	"Summer! The Beach! The KiraPâti Girls Get Stranded!"; Transliteration: "Natsu da! Umi da! KiraPati Hyōryūki!" (Japanese: 夏だ！海だ！キラパティ漂流記！)	August 6, 2017
The girls take a trip to the beach, where Ichika uses Kirakiraru to set the patisserie afloat a large inflatable ring. As a result, they get pulled out by the waves and land on an uninhabited island, and both Ciel and Pekorin become hungry. As the girls search for ingredients to make sweets and help the two fairies, Kirarin comes across Bibly, who was also stranded. After the girls find a cave of icicles and make penguin shaved ice, Kirarin transforms back to Ciel and gives some to Bibly out of concern for her. Angered by loneliness, Bibly uses the shaved ice's Kirakiraru to power up Iru and attack Ciel, but he indiscriminately attacks her. Ciel risks herself to protect Bibly, assuring her that she doesn't have to be alone, before purifying Iru. As Bibly uses the shaved ice's kirakiraru to escape the island, Ciel, determined to one day be friends with Bibly, discovers that the crystal she received from the shrine has become her Crystal Animal.
27	"The Hot Live Battle! Aoi vs. Misaki!"; Transliteration: "Atsu~i Raibu Batoru! Aoi tai Misaki!" (Japanese: アツ～いライブバトル！あおいVSミサキ！)	August 13, 2017
Aoi's band Wild Azure is accepted into the Blue Rock Festival, which Misaki's band Ganache is also participating in. Aoi gets to meet Misaki herself, but she seems disappointed that meeting her was her dream, Aoi also discovers both of their bands are performing at the same time, causing Wild Azur's audience to dwindle. Despite trying to keep up appearances in front of her friends, Aoi is overwhelmed by frustration and runs off in tears. Elysio manipulates her inner darkness and her feelings of envy and has her attack the festival. Before Aoi can destroy the stage, Ichika calls out to her, helping her to remember her love of music and realize her wish to reach a larger audience. This causes the crystal she received from the shrine to become her Crystal Animal. The Cures are able to defeat Elysio, and the next day, Aoi gives Misaki a Whale Chewy Gummy representing her toughness and vows to one day face her again.
28	"Rise! Himari's Big Sweets Experiment!"; Transliteration: "Fukurame! Himari no Suītsu Dai Jikken!" (Japanese: ふくらめ！ひまりのスイーツ大実験！)	August 20, 2017
Yuu Tachibana, a sweets scientist and the author of Himari's favorite book, asks her to be his assistant in a live experiment to bake a giant sponge cake. Despite her initial nerves, Himari manages to provide useful input when preparing the cake batter, but it collapses under its large weight. Himari blames herself, but Tachibana praises her efforts and assures her that her feelings helped make the experiment a success. Just then, Glaive steals the cake and audience's Kirakiraru to power up his Nendos. Finding the confidence to believe in herself, Himari gives the Cures science advice to help them combine their attacks and take down Glaive's Nendos. Afterwards, Himari reuses the sponge cake from the experiment to make Chick Cake Pops for everyone, and discovers that her crystal has become her Crystal Animal.
29	"Emergency! Cure Macaron, Stained in Darkness!"; Transliteration: "Dai Pinchi! Yami ni Somatta Kyua Makaron!" (Japanese: 大ピンチ！闇に染まったキュアマカロン！)	August 27, 2017
Yukari feels troubled by loneliness when around Akira and wonders why she is able to stay positive. After Yukari's grandmother gives the patisserie some matcha tea to make sweets with, the girls encourage Yukari to make macarons with it. On her way home, Yukari is attacked by Elysio and lured her into a mirror world formed from her inner heart. There, Yukari is confronted by a manifestation of her younger self, who represent the loneliness that she tried to hide. Despite this darkness, she admits that she finds light in the joy her friends have given her, allowing her to break free from the mirror world. As her crystal becomes her Crystal Animal to reflect her newfound discovery, she helps the Cures defeat Elysio.
30	"The Targeted School Festival! Chocolat in Wonderland!"; Transliteration: "Nerawareta Gakuensai! Shokora in Wandārando!" (Japanese: 狙われた学園祭！ショコラ・イン・ワンダーランド！)	September 3, 2017
At Yukari and Akira's high school, Akira is put in charge of an Alice in Wonderland themed school festival and leaves Miku in the care of Ichika and the others. As Miku has fun exploring the festival and decorating cookies, Akira is concerned over her condition but has to focus on helping everyone as committee president. Just then, Elysio attacks the festival and traps Akira inside a barrier, forcing her to choose between protecting Miku or saving the attendees from having their Kirakiraru drained. Akira uses her own Kirakiraru to save both Miku and the attendees, and her resolve causes her crystal to become her Crystal Animal. Everyone's Kirakiraru allows Akira to break the barrier and help the Cures defeat his monsters.
31	"Hold Back the Tears! The Reason for Ichika's Smile!"; Transliteration: "Namida wa Gaman! Ichika Egao no Wake!" (Japanese: 涙はガマン！いちか笑顔の理由！)	September 10, 2017
Ichika's mother, Satomi, finally returns from her overseas work and Ichika is encouraged to spend time with her. Upon learning that she is leaving the next day, Ichika tries to make strawberry shortcake for her. However, her attempts end up in failure since her conflicted emotions cause the cakes to lack Kirakiraru. Sensing that Ichika had been forcing herself to smile despite her loneliness, Satomi encourages her to let out the tears she had been holding back. After finding her true smile, Ichika finishes her cake and sees Satomi off before helping the other Cures fight Glaive, during which her crystal becomes her Crystal Animal. Meanwhile, Noir fills Bibly with more darkness and gives her a final chance to defeat the Cures.
32	"Kirakira Sparkle, Six Unique Traits! Kirakiraru Creamer!"; Transliteration: "Kiratto Kagayake Muttsu no Kosei! Kirakiraru Kurīmā!" (Japanese: キラッと輝け6つの個性！キラキラルクリーマー！)	September 17, 2017
The girls take their Crystal Animals to the underground shrine to seek answers, but Bibly attacks them. As they struggle to fight against the darkness consuming her, they are suddenly transported back in time one hundred years to the Showa era, when Strawberry Mountain was stained in darkness. They meet the legendary Pretty Cure, Lumière, and help her make sweets for the townsfolk. Meanwhile, Bibly, who was also sent back in time, discovers that Noir had tricked her and caused her to become isolated. Noticing the power radiating from the Crystal Animals, Lumière gives the girls her creamer before sending them back to their own time. As the girls try to befriend Bibly, Iru takes control of her and transforms into a huge monster. After hearing Bibly's cry for help, the girls combine their awakened crystals with Lumière's creamer to form the Kirakiraru Creamers, allowing them to kill Iru and save Bibly.
33	"Sweets are Dangerous!? The Animal of Darkness Reawakens!"; Transliteration: "Suītsu ga Kiken!? Fukkatsu, Yami no Animaru!" (Japanese: スイーツがキケン！？復活、闇のアニマル！)	September 24, 2017
Bibly begins working at the Kirakira Patisserie to pay off the cupcakes she eats. Suddenly, Diable, Noir's henchman from a hundred years ago, appears before them, but leaves shortly afterwards to get Kirakiraru and restore his form. The girls fear that the town will once again fall under Noir's darkness and that the very sweets they make could cause people to suffer. The Crystal Animals then run off, sending the girls on a wild goose chase that helps them realize the importance of sweets. When Diable returns and uses the darkness to attack, the Cures are able to defeat him with help from the Crystal Animals.
34	"A Little Grudge Match! Cat Yukari vs. Fairy Kirarin!"; Transliteration: "Chīsana Dai Kettō! Neko Yukari tai Yōsei Kirarin!" (Japanese: 小さな大決闘！ねこゆかりVS妖精キラリン！)	October 1, 2017
Yukari swaps places with her Crystal Animal after it collides with her. Now able to understand cat language, Yukari learns that the neighboring cats are fighting with the fairies over Strawberry Mountain's lake. After noticing a dark energy that is causing the cats and fairies to fight with each other, Yukari fights Ciel in her fairy form, Kirarin, who is unaware of Yukari's true identity, over who should have leave the mountain. Feeling that she should serve as a bad guy so everyone else can get along, Yukari jumps off a cliff, but is saved by Kirarin and the other cats and fairies. After discovering that Diable is the one behind the fighting, Yukari manages to return to her original body and help the Cures defeat his remnants.
35	"Complementary Tastes! Himari and Aoi!"; Transliteration: "Dekoboko Pittari! Himari to Aoi!" (Japanese: デコボコぴったり！ひまりとあおい！)	October 8, 2017
Aoi invites Himari to attend a fancy corporate event at her mansion, which the Kirakira Patisserie is also participating in. However, Himari starts to feel out of place when the other guests mock her for being a normal schoolgirl. After she drops her recipe book, Aoi helps her find it, but then Diable appears to spread darkness, causing an accident that ruins a new product announcement. Aoi tries to take the blame for the accident, but Himari works up the courage to stand up for her. Diable attacks and attempts to capture Himari, but Aoi assures her of the strength of their friendship, buying enough time for the others to save her and help defeat Diable. Afterwards, Himari and Aoi clear things up with the other guests and realize their friendship excels because of their differences.
36	"Ichika and Akira! The Great Ichigozaka Games!"; Transliteration: "Ichika to Akira! Ichigozaka Daiundōkai!" (Japanese: いちかとあきら！いちご坂大運動会！)	October 15, 2017
Akira is asked to represent Ichika's neighborhood in the Ichigozaka Sports Festival, where the town's districts compete against each other. As the festival gets underway, Akira succeeds in multiple events, but Ichika notices that something is amiss with Akira and that her Dog Crystal Animal is feeling unwell, deducing that Akira had caught a cold from Miku. She convinces Akira to take things easy while she takes her place in the festival, with the other girls providing support. But then Diable, now in a more complete form, spreads darkness around the festival, prompting Akira to join the other Cures in battle. Diable hampers the Cures with his darkness, but Ichika, who admired how hard Akira worked even while sick, helps the others defeat him. Afterwards, Glaive kills Diable and takes his power for himself while Akira looks after Ichika, who has caught a cold herself.
37	"Salut! Ciel's Going Back to France!?"; Transliteration: "Saryū! Shieru, Furansu e Sarū!?" (Japanese: サリュー！シエル、フランスへ去るぅー！？)	October 22, 2017
During Halloween, Madame Solène, a patissiere who Ciel worked under in France, is curious why Ciel chooses to stay in Ichigozaka, urging her to return to Paris to participate in a sweets contest. As Ichika and the others worry they're holding Ciel back from her dream, Bibly encourages Ciel to focus on what she wants to do. Ciel states her desire to stay with the Kirakira Patissiere so she can continue discovering new things. After defeating Elysio's pumpkin monster, Ciel works with Ichika to create a Hamster Pumpkin Pudding, prompting Solène to accept Ciel's decision and encourage her to enter the contest alongside the others at the Kirakira Patisserie.
38	"Pekorin's a Person, Peko!"; Transliteration: "Pekorin Ningen ni Natchatta peko~!" (Japanese: ペコリン人間になっちゃったペコ～！)	October 29, 2017
After having a dream about Lumière, Pekorin wakes up to find she has gained a human form. Wanting to prove herself, Pekorin decides to go shopping for ingredients by herself, with the others watching her. Despite losing her purse midway, Pekorin manages to complete the errand without help. The next day, as Pekorin makes doughnuts for everyone, Glaive attacks with his car, which has been infused with Diable's energy. Wanting to protect everyone, Pekorin gives up her human form to provide the Cures with the Kirakiraru needed to defeat Glaive. Meanwhile, Pikario begins to move again.
39	"Aw, No! Pretty Cure's Enemy is Ichigozaka!?"; Transliteration: "Shonna~! Purikyua no Teki wa Ichigozaka!?" (Japanese: しょんな～！プリキュアの敵はいちご坂！？)	November 12, 2017
The Cures and Gummy's group are invited to an assembly of fairies from around the world to learn how to make sweets. Just then, Glaive uses his Diable Custom car to turn Ichigozaka's citizens into Nendo minions. As the Cures find themselves unable to fight against their friends and neighbors and cannot stand up to Glaive's power, Pikario awakens from his slumber and comes to their aid.
40	"Let's la Costume-Change! Sweets Castle, Ready to Serve!"; Transliteration: "Rettsu Ra Okigae! Suītsu Kyassuru Dekiagari!" (Japanese: レッツ・ラ・おきがえ！スイーツキャッスルできあがり！)	November 19, 2017
Believing that the dark Kirakiraru plaguing the town can be negated with Kirakiraru made from sweets, Pikario and Bibly hold off Glaive while the Cures make sweets. However, Glaive catches onto their plan and steals the sweets' Kirakiraru, and also destroys Pikario's wand. While everything is seemingly lost, the neighborhood animals, who had been protected by the fragments of Pikario's wand containing Lumière's power, bring the fairies ingredients for sweets, allowing them to create Kirakiraru to cleanse the town of darkness and free the brainwashed citizens. Glaive merges himself with the Diable Custom to become a huge monster, but the Cures use everyone's Kirakiraru to create the Sweets Castle and defeat him with its power, after which Elysio seals him and Diable's soul into cards.
41	"Dreams Are Kira-Pika Inifinite!"; Transliteration: "Yume wa Kira☆Pika Mugendai!" (Japanese: 夢はキラ☆ピカ無限大！)	November 26, 2017
As Ciel is overjoyed to have Pikario (as Rio) in her life again, the neighborhood chefs suddenly accuse Rio of stealing Kirakiraru from their sweets and turn against Ciel when she defends him. While the others believe Rio's innocence and sense something is amiss, Rio feels weighed down by his past sins and runs off. As Ciel becomes conflicted over giving up her dream as a patissiere to stay with Rio, Ichika proposes that she try making waffles again. Later that night, Akira and Yukari manage to defeat the imposter while the others face Elysio as he powers himself up with Diable's card. Meanwhile, Ciel manages to find the real Pikario and convince to pursue his true dream of making sweets before returning to help the Cures defeat Elysio. With his innocence proven, Rio begins working with Ciel at her shop.
42	"Sing It Out, Wow! Aoi's Last Song!"; Transliteration: "Utae Uō! Aoi Rasuto Songu!" (Japanese: 歌えWOW！あおいラストソング！)	December 3, 2017
As it is announced that Wild Azur will face off against Misaki, the band's leader Sonobe suddenly announces that he is quitting the band to focus on studies, leaving Aoi distraught and uncertain about her dream's future. Hoping to cheer Aoi up, the girls hold a pajama party at the patisserie and help her realize that even if Wild Azur disbands, her love of music and her dream will live on. With renewed motivation, Aoi writes a final song for Wild Azur to perform at their battle against Misaki. But on the day of the battle, Elysio crashes the concert and uses a magician's outfit to capture Aoi's bandmates and the Cures before trapping Aoi in a glass cage without her voice, hoping to crush her dream. However, even without a voice, Aoi manages to sing a song that resonates with everyone's hearts, and breaks herself and her friends free. After Elysio is defeated, Aoi and Wild Azur perform their final song together, and her parents choose Mizushima as their new heir to allow her to pursue her dream.
43	"The Secret Ingredient is Courage! Himari's Recipe For the Future!"; Transliteration: "Kakushi Aji wa Yūki desu! Himari no Mirai Reshipi!" (Japanese: かくし味は勇気です！ひまりの未来レシピ！)	December 10, 2017
Feeling she has become more confident, Himari decides to enter an audition to become an assistant on a television cooking show. On the day of the audition, she panics after inadvertently on a rant in front of the judges and fears she hasn't been able to change herself. The girls try to encourage Himari to be herself, but she remains self-deprecating. Just then, Elysio spreads Diable's darkness across the TV studio and burns Himari's sweets notebook, aiming to send her further into despair by reminding her of the loneliness caused by her sweets obsession. However, Himari manages to recall all the joy she has experienced since she first made pudding with Ichika, overcoming Elysio's darkness and realizing there are some parts of herself that don't need to be changed. Following the battle, Himari ends up taking the audition again as Cure Custard and manages to handle herself more confidently.
44	"Feelings Hidden in the Snow! Shout Out Your Love, Akira!"; Transliteration: "Yuki ni Himeta Omoi! Ai o Sakebe, Akira!" (Japanese: 雪に秘めた想い！愛をさけべ、あきら！)	December 17, 2017
As Miku objects to Akira wanting to become a researcher for her sake, Elysio targets and kidnaps her as she blames herself for holding Akira back because of her illness. As Akira and the others learn that Miku has disappeared from the hospital, Elysio lures Akira into his dimension and uses Miku's self-loathing to create a giant snowman monster. As Akira become trapped inside the snowman, Elysio tries to manipulate Akira over the loneliness she felt over being unable to play with Miku. However, Akira uses her love to break free from the darkness and declares she wants to become a researcher to help children. After escaping Noir's dimension, Akira fulfils her promise to Miku by making white chocolate snow dogs with her.
45	"Farewell, Yukari! The Thrilling Sweets Christmas!"; Transliteration: "Sayonara Yukari! Tokimeki ☆ Suītsu Kurisumasu!" (Japanese: さよならゆかり！トキメキ☆スイーツクリスマス！)	December 24, 2017
Yukari proposes that the patisserie holds a Christmas party and asks Ciel to teach her how to make the perfect macaron. The party is a huge success, but then Yukari announces that she plans to move abroad to the Duchy of Confeito to study sweets. Elysio attacks again, but Yukari and the other Cures manage to defeat him, after which everyone lets out their tears over Yukari's impending departure.
46	"The Big Battle With Noir! A Birthday Without Smiles!"; Transliteration: "Nowāru Daikessen! Egao no Kieta Bāsudē!" (Japanese: ノワール大決戦！笑顔の消えたバースデー！)	January 7, 2018
As everyone prepares to celebrate Ichika's birthday, Noir fuses himself with Elysio. While everyone else discusses their dreams for the future, Ichika's parents encourage her to aim for a dream based on her own love of sweets. On the day of Ichika's birthday, as she celebrates with her friends and family, and just as she is about to blow out her fourteen candles on her very own special Rabbit’s Heart Cake, Noir, now in Elysio's form, appears and spreads his darkness across the town. As Lumière shows up to defend the Cures, Noir reveals what happened between them 100 years ago. He was unable to make sweets himself and demanded that Lumière make sweets only for him: when she refused, he stained the town in darkness. Believing there is still a smile in Noir's heart, Ichika and the others use Lumière's power to overpower Noir's darkness. However, Elysio regains his form and kills both Noir and Lumière and seals them in cards, using their power to reshape the world into one where neither love nor hate exists. As a result, the Cures' Kirakiru is stolen and Pekorin and Chourou remain in the KiraPati box.
47	"Return the Love! Cure Pekorin, Ready to Serve!"; Transliteration: "Daisuki o Torimodose! Kyua Pekorin Dekiagari!" (Japanese: 大好きをとりもどせ！キュアペコリンできあがり！)	January 14, 2018
After being put inside the KiraPati box by Ichika's memories as Cure Whip before Elysio's power took effect, Pekorin and the Elder are the only ones left unaffected, as everyone else has had their emotions and memories taken away. Furthermore, Noir revives Glaive to act as an enforcer and take people's Kirakiraru away when they show emotion. Pekorin tries making doughnuts to help bring back people's memories, but Glaive captures her and takes her to his factory. As Glaive attempts to dispose of the doughnuts, the Kirakiraru inside them bursts forth, drawing Ichika and the others towards the factory. Risking her own life to protect the doughnuts, Pekorin regains her human form and obtains the power to transform into Cure Pekorin. Using this power, Pekorin helps the girls regain their memories and powers in time for the final battle against Elysio.
48	"The Final Battle! The Whole World, Let's la Mix-It-Up!"; Transliteration: "Saigo no Tatakai! Sekai Marugoto Rettsu Ra Maze Maze!" (Japanese: さいごの戦い！世界まるごとレッツ・ラ・まぜまぜ！)	January 21, 2018
Elysio fuses himself with Noir and Lumière's power to battle the Cures, claiming to be an empty shell with no heart. As the Cures use their love to fight against Elysio's emptiness, their feelings help the other manipulated citizens regain their individual loves and cheer them on, allowing them to overpower Elysio's attack. Remaining defiant over creating a peaceful world with no conflict, Elysio sucks the Cures and the world inside his body, intending to die with them. As the Cures watch their loved ones disappear, everyone lends them their Kirakiraru, leading them to where Elysio has locked himself away. They find that Elysio does have a heart of his own, born from the cupcake Lumière once made Noir, and use his Kirakiraru along with everyone's to restore the world to normal. Elysio relinquishes Noir and Lumière's power before leaving, looking forward to how the world will turn out, and Ichika finally gets to celebrate her birthday.
49	"Go Where Love Takes You! Whip, Step, Jump!"; Transliteration: "Daisuki no Saki e! Hoippu Suteppu Jānpu!" (Japanese: 大好きの先へ！ホイップ・ステップ・ジャーンプ！)	January 28, 2018
One year after the final battle with Elysio, the Kirakira Patisserie prepares for its final day of business before everyone goes their separate ways. As Yukari returns from overseas for the occasion, she leads a girl named Hana Nono to the shop, where they make sweets for her baby companion, Hugtan. It is then that Ichika reveals she wants to travel around the world and make sweets for everyone to fulfil her promise to Elysio, but is conflicted about leaving the patisserie behind. As Hana leaves the store, the Kirakiraru from her sweets causes the Elder's body, which had been separated from his spirit, to rise from underground and attack the town. As the Cures struggle against it, Pekorin and the fairies step in to fight and protect the town in Ichika's stead. Assisted by another Pretty Cure named Cure Yell, Pekorin manages to calm down the Elder's body and reunite it with his spirit. Some time later, as everyone pursues their own dreams, Ichika continues to take the Kirakira Patisserie around the world to bring smiles and sweets to those she meets.

== See also ==
- KiraKira PreCure à la Mode: Crisply! The Memory of Mille-feuille! – An animated film based on the series.
- Pretty Cure Dream Stars! – The first Pretty Cure Stars crossover film, which features the Kirakira Pretty Cure a la Mode team.
