= Pretty Cure (2004 TV series) =

Japanese anime television series

- Cover of the first DVD volume of Pretty Cure by Marvelous Entertainment, with Cure Black/Nagisa (left) and Cure White/Honoka (right)

ふたりはプリキュア (Futari wa Purikyua)
- Genre: Magical girl
- Created by: Izumi Todo
- Anime television series
- Directed by: Daisuke Nishio
- Produced by: Moegi Nishizawa; Rika Tsuruzaki; Shigehaki Dohi; Takashi Washio; Tomoko Takahashi
- Written by: Ryo Kawasaki
- Music by: Naoki Satō
- Studio: Toei Animation
- Licensed by: NA: Toei Animation Inc.; SG: Odex
- Original network: ANN (ABC, TV Asahi)
- English network: CA: YTV; SG: Kids Central; UK: Pop
- Original run: February 1, 2004 – January 30, 2005
- Episodes: 49
- Manga
- Written by: Izumi Todo
- Illustrated by: Futago Kamikita
- Published by: Kodansha
- Magazine: Nakayoshi
- Original run: March 2004 – March 2005
- Volumes: 4
- Anime television series

Pretty Cure Max Heart
- Directed by: Daisuke Nishio
- Produced by: Shigehaki Dohi; Takashi Washio; Tomoko Takahashi
- Written by: Ryo Kawasaki
- Music by: Naoki Sato
- Studio: Toei Animation
- Licensed by: NA: Toei Animation Inc.; SG: Odex
- Original network: ANN (ABC, TV Asahi)
- English network: SG: Kids Central
- Original run: February 6, 2005 – January 29, 2006
- Episodes: 47
- Manga
- Written by: Izumi Todo
- Illustrated by: Futago Kamikita
- Published by: Kodansha
- Magazine: Nakayoshi
- Original run: March 2005 – March 2006
- Video games
- Futari wa Pretty Cure: Arienai! Yume no Sono wa Daimeikyu (2004); Futari wa Pretty Cure: Max Heart – Maji? Maji!? Fight de IN Janai (2005); Futari wa PreCure Max Heart – Danzen! DS de PreCure – Chikara o Awasete Dai Battle (2005)
- Anime films
- Pretty Cure Max Heart the Movie (2005); Pretty Cure Max Heart 2: Yukizora no Tomodachi (2005)

Pretty Cure (ふたりはプリキュア, Futari wa Purikyua; lit. 'We Are Pretty Cure'), also sometimes stylized as PreCure, is a Japanese anime television series produced by Toei Animation and the first installment in the Pretty Cure metaseries created by Izumi Todo. It aired on ANN, with 96 episodes across two seasons.

The first season, directed by Daisuke Nishio, aired from February 1, 2004, to January 30, 2005, in the same timeslot as Toei's previous series, Ashita no Nadja. It received an English-dubbed version, which aired in Canada from March 2009 to July 2010. In the season, two middle school students gain the power to transform into the "protectors of light", Pretty Cure, and are tasked with collecting the Prism Stones to restore the Garden of Light while fighting against the forces of the Dark Zone, who caused its destruction. A second season, Pretty Cure Max Heart (ふたりはプリキュア Max Heart, Futari wa Purikyua Makkusu Hāto), aired in Japan from February 6, 2005, to January 29, 2006. It introduces another member of the group, Shiny Luminous, and follows the Cures' efforts in collecting the twelve Heartiels to revive the Queen, whose life has taken the form of Hikari Kujou/Shiny Luminous. Two Max Heart movies were released on April 16 and December 10, 2005, respectively. It was succeeded by PreCure Splash Star in its timeslot. The series' main motif is yin and yang.

== Plot ==
Pretty Cure follows two girls, Nagisa Misumi and Honoka Yukishiro, who one day encounter Mipple and Mepple, who are from the Garden of Light. They give them the power to transform into the emissaries of light, Cure Black and Cure White, to fight against the forces of the Dark Zone: a dimension of evil that attacked the Garden of Light and now plans to invade the Garden of Rainbows, Earth. The Cures search for the Prism Stones to restore the Garden of Light, placing them in the Prism Hopish, a device protected by the Guardian, Wisdom. Once the Prism Stones are recovered, their power transports them to the Garden of Light and repairs most of the damage done by the Dark Zone. Later on, Pollun, the Prince of the Garden of Light, grants them the power of the Rainbow Bracelets to defeat the Dark King. After the Dark King's defeat, three new villains, known as the Seeds of Darkness, are born from him and seek the power of the Prism Stones for themselves.

In Max Heart, Nagisa and Honoka meet the mysterious Hikari Kujou, who is revealed to be the "life" of the Queen. Following her battle with the Dark King, the Queen was separated into three parts: the twelve Heartiels, which represent her will, the Queen Chairect, which represents her heart, and Hikari Kujou, who represents her life. Meanwhile, the remnants of the Dark Zone are protecting a mysterious boy, who is believed to be the "life" of the Dark King. Together with Hikari, who gains the power to transform into Shiny Luminous, the Cures once again fight against the Dark Zone in order to retrieve the Heartiels and restore the Queen.

== Characters ==
Where appropriate, names on the left are from the original Japanese version, whilst names on the right without Japanese text are from both the Canadian and Singaporean English dubs. Character descriptions pertain to the Japanese version of the show.

=== Pretty Cures ===
Nagisa Misumi (美墨 なぎさ, Misumi Nagisa; Natalie Blackstone in the English dub) / Cure Black (キュアブラック, Kyua Burakku)
Voiced by: Yōko Honna (Japanese); Rocio Barahona (English)
One of the two main protagonists. A 14/15-year-old girl and student in her second and later third year of Verone Academy's Sakura Class, who is the ace of its lacrosse team. She is strong-willed but lazy, as she dislikes doing homework, and is also a food lover, her favorite dish being the takoyaki from Akane's food stand. Although generally brave, she often becomes flustered around Shogo, whom she has a crush on. She is known for her catchphrase "Unbelievable!" (ありえな～い!, Ariena~i). As Cure Black, she specializes in physical combat. She introduces herself as "Emissary of light, Cure Black!" (光の使者、キュアブラック!, Hikari no shisha, Kyua Burakku!) Her theme color is black and her secondary colour is pink.
Honoka Yukishiro (雪城 ほのか, Yukishiro Honoka; Hannah Whitehouse in the English dub) / Cure White (キュアホワイト, Kyua Howaito)
Voiced by: Yukana (Japanese); Michelle Molineux (English)
One of the two main protagonists. A 14/15-year-old girl who is Nagisa's classmate and friend at Verone Academy and lives with her grandmother Sanae and her dog Chuutaro since her parents are working overseas. She is known as "The Queen of Knowledge" for her intelligence, and the members of Verone Academy's science club, of which she is a member, look up to her. Although she has few friends, they are close to her, and she has come to appreciate Nagisa's friendship. She introduces herself as "Emissary of light, Cure White!" (光の使者、キュアホワイト！, Hikari no shisha, Kyua Howaito!) Her theme color is white and her secondary colour is blue.

==== Additional members ====
Hikari Kujou (九条 ひかり, Kūjō Hikari) / Shiny Luminous (シャイニールミナス, Shainī Ruminasu)
Voiced by: Rie Tanaka
A shy blonde-haired girl who appears in Max Heart. She is physically 13 years old and is the "life" of the Queen in human form after the Queen was split apart following her encounter with the Dark King. Going under the guise of Akane's cousin and working at her takoyaki stand, Hikari enrolls in Verone Academy as a freshman and befriends Nagisa and Honoka. At the end of Max Heart, although it was believed that she would have to sacrifice her existence for the Queen to be revived, she is reborn as a human separate from her. She gains power from Pollun to transform into Shiny Luminous, and later gains more power from Lulun. Despite her lack of fighting skills or strength, her abilities can hinder opponents and enhance Black and White's attacks. She introduces herself as "Shining life, Shiny Luminous! The light's heart and the light's will, for the sake of uniting all as one!" (輝く生命、シャイニールミナス！光の心と光の意志、総てをひとつにするために！, Kagayaku inochi, Shainī Ruminasu! Hikari no kokoro to hikari no ishi, subete o hitotsu ni suru tame ni!) Her theme color is pink and her secondary colour is yellow.

=== Garden of Light ===
The Garden of Light (光の園, Hikari no Sono) is a realm ruled by the Queen and protected by the power of the Prism Stones, which the Dark Zone seeks for themselves. Prior to the events of Pretty Cure, they attacked the Garden of Light and stole five of the seven Prism Stones, with Mepple and Mipple being given the Red and Blue Stones, respectively, before being sent to Earth to find those who could become Pretty Cure and fight against the Dark Zone.

Mepple (メップル, Meppuru)
Voiced by: Tomokazu Seki (Japanese); Roger Rhodes (English)
The chosen protector of Mipple, the Princess of Hope, who gives Nagisa the power to transform into Cure Black and lives with her. He is selfish, as he often argues with Nagisa, is possessive of Mipple, and becomes jealous when Pollun does not pay attention to him. He ends his sentences with "mepo". Mepple can only stay in his true form for a short time before growing tired, so on Earth he takes on an energy-saving form that resembles a cell phone.
Mipple (ミップル, Mippuru)
Voiced by: Akiko Yajima (Japanese); Angie Beers (English)
The Princess of Hope of the Garden of Light, who gives Honoka the power to transform into Cure White and lives with her; like her, she is generally more reserved. Although Mepple is implied to have feelings for her, Mipple sticking up for Pollun causes problems between them. She ends her sentences with "mipo". Like Mepple, she usually stays in a cell phone-like form to conserve energy.
Pollun (ポルン, Porun)
Voiced by: Haruna Ikezawa (Japanese); Onalea Gilbertson (English)
The Prince of the Garden of Light, who is sent to Earth once the Cures have retrieved the Prism Stones, with the Queen giving a cryptic statement about his powers aiding them. Later, before Wisdom is captured, he places the power of the Prism Stones into Pollun, giving him the power to remain in his regular form while on Earth. He also gains the ability to communicate with the Garden of Light through a form called the Pretty Commune, and grants the Cures the power of light and the Rainbow Bracelets. He is energetic and tends to be selfish and childish. He lives mainly with Nagisa in Pretty Cure and Hikari in Pretty Cure Max Heart.
Lulun (ルルン, Rurun)
Voiced by: Asuka Tanii
Appearing in Max Heart. She is Pollun's younger sister and is known as the Princess of Light who connects the future. She can give the power of the Heartiel Brooch to Luminous.
Queen (クイーン, Kuīn)
Voiced by: Kaya Matsutani (Japanese); Elizabeth Ludwig (English)
The ruler of the Garden of Light, who aids the Cures when she can. During Max Heart, she is split into Hikari, the twelve Heartiels, and the Queen Chairect. Like the Dark King, she is animated using CGI.
Wisdom (ウィズダム, Wizudamu)
Voiced by: Taiki Matsuno (Japanese); Glenn Howard (English)
The guardian of the Prism Stones, who is often referred to as The Guardian (番人, Bannin).
Elder (長老, Chōrō)
Voiced by: Hiroshi Naka (Japanese); Jonathan Love (English)
A wise sage and resident of the Garden of Light. Despite his wisdom, he often forgets Nagisa and Honoka's names and refers to them as the Pretty Cura.
Heartiels (ハーティエル, Hātieru)
Twelve fairies who are the embodiments of the Queen's will. The Cures must recover them in order to restore the Queen, placing them in the Queen Chairect, an item representing the Queen's heart. When they want one of the Heartiels to help them, Seekun turns the knob around to let one of them out of the Chairect.
Seekun (シークン, Shīkun; Seek)
Voiced by: Ai Nagano
The first of the Heartiels to be discovered, who represents the Queen's sense of adventure and discovery, and as such is naive about the world and asks many questions. When the Cures need the help of another Heartiel, Seekun is responsible for calling them out of the Queen Chairect. She is the last Heartiel to enter the Chairect, with her symbol in the Chairect being a telescope. She seems to prefer Nagisa, as she enjoys spending time with her over Honoka.
Passion (パション, Pashon; Passion)
Voiced by: Kokoro Kikuchi
He is accompanied by a white dove. His symbol in the Chairect is a torch.
Harmonin (ハーモニン, Hāmonin; Harmony)
Voiced by: Eri Sendai
She first appears in episode 9, but meets the Cures in episode 10. She is often seen with a treasure box, which is also her symbol in the Chairect.
Pyuran (ピュアン, Pyuan; Purity)
Voiced by: Rika Komatsu
Her symbol in the Chairect is the snowflake.
Inteligen (インテリジェン, Interijen; Intelligence)
Voiced by: Mayuko Kobayashi
A Heartiel entrusted with the Book of Wisdom, which she uses to help the Cures find a way to oppose Baldez's power. At first, she does not like Nagisa, but comes to like her after seeing her pure heart. Her symbol in the Chairect is the book.
Wishun (ウィシュン, Wishun; Wish)
Voiced by: Yukiko Hanioka
Her symbol in the Chairect is the mirror.
Hopun (ホープン, Hōpun; Hope)
Voiced by: Yusuke Numata
His symbol in the Chairect is the key.
Braven (ブレイブン, Bureibun; Bravery)
Voiced by: Mari Adachi
First seen at the end of episode 31. Her symbol in the Chairect is the crown.
Prosen (プロスン, Purosun; Prosperity)
Voiced by: Masato Amada
His symbol in the Chairect is the pear.
Happinen (ハピネン, Hapinen; Happiness)
Voiced by: Sawa Ishige
Her symbol in the Chairect is the bell.
Lovelun (ラブラン, Raburan; Love)
Voiced by: Oma Ichimura
Her symbol in the Chairect is the ring.
Eternalun (エターナルン, Etānarun; Eternal)
Voiced by: Fumie Mizusawa
His symbol in the Chairect is the pocket watch.

=== Dark Zone ===
The villains of Pretty Cure. They come from the Dark Zone (ドツクゾーン, Dotsukuzōn), a realm of darkness ruled by the Dark King.

Dark King (ジャアクキング, Jāku Kingu)
Voiced by: Kenichi Ono (Japanese); Tom Edwards (English)
The imprisoned ruler of the Dark Zone, who seeks to acquire the Prism Stones to gain immortality and prevent the "power to consume all things" from eventually destroying his body—he believes that it is the fate of all things to be consumed by darkness. Like the Queen, he is animated using CGI.
Zakenna (ザケンナー, Zakennā)
Voiced by: Hitoshi Bifu (ep 1-22), Satoshi Taki (ep 15, ep 28 onwards) (Japanese); Tom Edwards (English)
Monsters summoned by the servants of the Dark Zone, who combine them with objects or living things. Upon being defeated by a purifying move, they burst into several small star-shaped monsters called Gomennah (ゴメンナー, Gomennā; derived from the word for 'sorry'), who scurry off apologizing.

==== Dark Five ====
The Dark King's first wave of servants, who each possess a Prism Stone.

Pisard (ピーサード, Pīsādo; Pijard in the English dub)
Voiced by: Hiroki Takahashi (Japanese); David Belke (English)
The guardian of the Green Prism Stone. He resembles a Kabuki actor in "keshō" ("make up") due to having long hair and a painted face. His human disguise is Ryuuichi Kazama (風間竜一, Kazama Ryūichi; Richard Komodo in the English dub).
Gekidrago (ゲキドラーゴ, Gekidorāgo)
Voiced by: Kōji Ishii (Japanese); Kevin Gilese (English)
The guardian of the Blue Prism Stone and the strongest of the Dark Five, who relies on brawn over brains and has the highest fortitude of the group, as he can withstand being hit by the Marble Screw.
Poisony (ポイズニー, Poizunī; Pandora in the English dub)
Voiced by: Sakiko Uran (Japanese); Onalea Gilbertson (English)
The guardian of the Orange Prism Stone, who often takes on a human disguise to gain the Cures trust before attacking. In her true form, she resembles a vampire, as she has pale skin and fangs.
Kiriya (キリヤ, Kiriya; Kirea in the English dub)
Voiced by: Reiko Kiuchi (Japanese); Scott Roberts (English)
The youngest of the Dark Five and Poisony's younger brother, who is the guardian of the Yellow Prism Stone. He comes to Earth to spy on Nagisa and Honoka, infiltrating Verone Academy under the guise of the freshman Kiriya Irisawa (入澤 キリヤ, Irisawa Kiriya). Despite this, he ends up befriending them and develops a fondness and love for Honoka because of her showing kindness to him. Later on, his feelings for Honoka and his attempts to understand human emotions cause him to be unable to fight the Cures. This causes him to be sent back to the Dark Zone, but not before willingly giving up his Prism Stone to the Cures. After the Dark King is destroyed, he returns as a normal human.
Ilkubo (イルクーボ, Irukūbo)
Voiced by: Issei Futamata (Japanese); Jonathan Love (English)
The leader of the Dark Five and their most powerful member, as well as the Dark King's right-hand man and the guardian of the Purple Prism Stone. Despite his strength and being able to withstand the Marble Screw and other attacks, his fortitude is not as high as Gekidrago. He later appears on Earth, but does not start fighting the Cures until after Kiriya is sent back to the Dark Zone. He is defeated, but later returns and takes on a more monstrous and powerful form to fight the Cures in the Dark Zone.

==== Three Seeds of Darkness ====
A villainous trio who appear after the Dark Five and the Dark King are defeated, being born from the Dark King and initially normal humans until they awaken their powers and transform into their true selves. They are accompanied by a macaw and the Butler Zakenna.

Belzei Gertrude (ベルゼイ・ガートルード, Beruzei Gātorūdo; Beruzei in the English dub)
Voiced by: Tomomichi Nishimura (Japanese); Paul Hudson (English)
The leader of the Seeds of Darkness, whose human alias is Genbu Yuuki (結城玄武, Yūki Genbu; Dr. Encastle in the English dub). He is a plotter and a sadist who blends in by impersonating others. Due to his ego, it is always someone in a high position, such as a head doctor or principal.
Regine (レギーネ, Regīne; Regina in the English dub)
Voiced by: Rika Fukami (Japanese); Carol-Anne Day (English)
The only female of the trio, whose human alias is Shoko Koyama (小山翔子, Koyama Shōko; Sheila in the English dub). When in human form, she has a tendency to mumble things, then suddenly scream. She is more confident in her dark form than her human form.
Juna (ジュナ, Jūna)
Voiced by: Yasunori Matsumoto (Japanese); Brendan Hunter (English)
The strongest member of the trio, whose human alias is Ryuichiro Kakuzawa (角澤竜一郎, Kazukawa Ryūichirō; Edgedale in the English dub)
Zakenna Butlers (執事ザケンナー, Shitsuji Zakennā)
Voiced by: Rika Komatsu & Satoshi Taki (Japanese); Dean Galloway & Jonathan Love (English)
Zakenna who are capable of human speech and look after the mansion that the Three Seeds and the Four Guardians reside in. While they often bicker, they are unwaveringly loyal to them.

==== Four Guardians ====
What remains of the Dark Zone, serving as the protectors of the "life" of the Dark King as they seek to revive him.

Baldez (バルデス, Barudesu)
Voiced by: Kenichi Ono
The strongest member of the Four Guardians and their leader, who is capable of withstanding Marble Screw, Luminous Heartiel Action and Extreme Luminario. It is later revealed that his true form is the spirit of the Dark King, who was revived and disguised himself as one of the Guardians.
Circulas (サーキュラス, Sākyurasu)
Voiced by: Hitoshi Bifu
The apparent second-in-command of the Four Guardians, who serves as their "leader" in Baldez's absence. He often argues with Uraganos.
Uraganos (ウラガノス, Uraganosu)
Voiced by: Wataru Takagi
One of the Guardians, who is reckless and tends to accidentally destroy things due to his size and strength.
Viblis (ビブリス, Biburisu)
Voiced by: Ai Kobayashi
The only female of the Guardians, who is more serious and intimidating than the others. She often scolds Uraganos and Circulas when they argue, and is also the type to never apologize, even when she is wrong.
The boy in the mansion (館の少年, Yakata no Shōnen)
Voiced by: Haruhi Nanao
A mysterious boy who is the 'life' of the Dark King, who is content with living in the mansion but seeks to experience life outside of it. He is seemingly connected to Hikari, as various incidents occur when they meet. At the end of Max Heart, he is reborn as Hikari's younger brother, Hikaru Kujo (九条 ひかる, Kūjō Hikaru).

=== Cures' families ===
Takashi Misumi / Terry Blackstone (美墨 岳, Misumi Takashi)
Voiced by: Takehito Koyasu (Japanese); Jonathan Love, Rodger Rhodes (Episode 34) (English)
Nagisa and Ryouta's father and Rie's husband.
Rie Misumi / Glenda Blackstone (美墨 理恵, Misumi Rie)
Voiced by: Mayumi Sho (Japanese); Onalea Gilbertson (English)
Takashi's wife and Nagisa and Ryouta's mother. Although her and Nagisa's relationship tends to be estranged at times, she deeply cares for her family. She is also seemingly the only one who can break up Nagisa and Ryouta's arguments.
Ryouta Misumi / Ryan Blackstone (美墨 亮太, Misumi Ryota)
Voiced by: Naozumi Takahashi (Japanese); Leah Dubbin-Steckel (English)
Nagisa's younger brother, whom he often pulls pranks on. Like the relationship between Nagisa and Mepple, he and Nagisa often bicker but still care for each other.
Sanae Yukishiro / Susan Whitehouse (雪城 さなえ, Yukishiro Sanae)
Voiced by: Masako Nozawa, Yuki Matsuoka (young) (Japanese); Michelle Armeneau, Onalea Gilbertson (young) (English)
Honoka's grandmother, who takes care of her while her parents work overseas in France. She seems to know a lot about the Pretty Cure, as she found Mipple when she was younger, though keeps this secret from Honoka and Nagisa.
Taro Yukishiro / Ken Whitehouse (雪城 太郎, Yukishiro Taro)
Voiced by: Takeru Miyashita (Japanese); Jonathan Love (English)
Honoka's father and Aya's husband.
Aya Yukishiro / Luca Whitehouse (雪城 文, Yukishiro Aya)
Voiced by: Miki Ito (Japanese); April McGregor (English)
Honoka's mother and Taro's wife.
Chuutaro (忠太郎, Chūtarō)
Voiced by: Ryōtarō Okiayu (Japanese); Roger Rhodes (English)
Honoka's dog.

=== Verone Academy ===
Yoshimi Takenouchi / Yvette Woodgrove (竹野内 よし美, Takenouchi Yoshimi)
Voiced by: Ai Nagano (Japanese); Cheryl McMaster (English)
The teacher of Nagisa and Honoka's class, who is romantic and quiet.
Principal (校長先生, Kōchō)
Voiced by: Kōzō Shioya (Japanese); Rodger Rhodes (English)
Verone Academy's principal, who is kind but clumsy.
Kometsuki / Mr. Weaver (米槻, Kometsuki)
Voiced by: Tomohiro Nishimura (Japanese); Steve Olson (English)
Verone Academy's vice principal.
Miyashita / Mr. McMasters (宮下先生, Miyashita-sensei)
Voiced by: Nobuaki Kanemitsu (Japanese); Glenn Howard (English)
Verone Academy's math teacher.

=== Classmates ===
Shougo Fujimura / Shawn Ferguson (藤村 省吾, Fujimura Shōgo)
Voiced by: Daisuke Kishio (Japanese); Will Wood (English)
Honoka's childhood friend, who Nagisa has a crush on. He is nicknamed FujiP (Fergie in the English dub) by his friends, and is a player of his soccer team.
Rina Takashimizu (高清水 莉奈, Takashimizu Rina)
Voiced by: Yuka Tokumitsu (Japanese); Emily Bachynski (English)
One of Nagisa's friends and a member of Verone Academy's lacrosse team.
Shiho Kubota / Shawna Knowles (久保田 志穂, Kubota Shiho)
Voiced by: Eri Sendai (Japanese); Nikkita Bradette (English)
One of Nagisa's friends and a member of Verone Academy's lacrosse team.
Yuriko / Lilian (ユリコ, Yuriko)
Voiced by: Kozue Kamada (Japanese); Katie Rowan, Lori Bachynski (Episode 40) (English)
Honoka's friend and a member of Verone Academy's science club.
Mayu Kashiwada / Maya Kennedy (柏田 真由, Kashiwada Mayu)
Voiced by: Akeno Watanabe (Japanese); Megan Malone (English)
An artist inspired by Mario Piccasseci, an artist who made the painting Stardust Banquet.
Yumiko Nakagawa / Nickie (中川 弓子, Nakagawa Yumiko)
Voiced by: Hitomi Nabatame (Japanese); Cheryl McMaster (English)
The captain of Verone Academy's lacrosse team.
Yuka Odajima / Emma (オダジマユカ, Odajima Yuka)
Voiced by: Mayumi Iizuka (Japanese); Laura Rushfeldt (English)
A member of Verone Academy's lacrosse team.
Natsuko Koshino / Summer (越野 夏子, Koshino Natsuko) and Kyoko Mori / Chrissy (森 京子, Mori Kyōko)
Voiced by: Ami Koshimizu (Natsuko) and Kaori Nazuka (Kyoko) (Japanese); Jasmin Dobranski (Summer) and Morgan Partridge (Chrissy) (English)
Friends who idolize the Cures and cosplay as them.
Seiko Taniguchi / Sophie (谷口 聖子, Taniguchi Seiko)
Voiced by: Konami Yoshida (Japanese); Lori Bachynski (English)
Nagisa and Honoka's classmate, who likes to play the piano.
Kimata / Kossner (木俣)
Voiced by: Satoshi Katogi (Japanese); Ian McMurray (English)
A member of the Verone Junior Boys' Institute's soccer team.
Yui Morioka / Julie Woodhill (森岡 唯, Morioka Yui)
Voiced by: Masako Jo (Japanese); Shannon Casorso (English)
Fujimura's love interest.
Chiaki Yabe / Sienna (矢部 千秋, Yabe Chiaki)
Voiced by: Akiko Nakagawa (Japanese); Marcy Lannan (English)
Nagisa and Honoka's classmate, who is part of the choir and directs and plays the piano.
Kazuki Hasekura / Hamilton (支倉一樹, Hasekura Kazuki)
Voiced by: Toshinobu Iida (Japanese); Joel Crichton (English)
A member of the Verone Junior Boys' Institute's soccer team.
Nao Tabata (多幡 奈緒, Tabata Nao) and Miu Kagayama (加賀山 美羽, Kagayama Miu)
Voiced by: Kokoro Kikuchi (Nao) and Fumie Mizusawa (Miu)
Hikari's classmates.
Maki (マキ) and Megumi (メグミ)
Voiced by: Haruhi Nanao (Maki) and Yoko Nishino (Megumi)
Members of Verone Academy's lacrosse team.

=== Other characters ===
Akane Fujita / Alex (藤田 アカネ, Fujita Akane)
Voiced by: Mikako Fujita (Japanese); Annika Odegard (English)
The previous captain of Verone Academy's lacrosse team, who runs her own takoyaki stand, which Nagisa frequently visits. In Max Heart, she serves as Hikari's guardian under the assumption she is her cousin.

== Media ==
=== Anime ===
The original Pretty Cure anime aired in Japan between February 1, 2004, and January 30, 2005. The opening theme is "Danzen! Futari wa Pretty Cure" (Danzen! ふたりはプリキュア, Danzen! Futari wa Purikyua; "Definitely! Together, We Are Pretty Cure") by Mayumi Gojo whilst the ending theme is "Get You! Love Love?!" (ゲッチュウ！らぶらぶぅ？！, Getchū! Rabu Rabu?!) also by Gojo. The follow-up series, Max Heart, aired in Japan between February 6, 2005, and January 29, 2006. The opening theme is "Danzen! Futari wa Pretty Cure (Max Heart ver.)" (DANZEN！ふたりはプリキュア（ver．MaxHeart）) by Mayumi Gojo. The first ending theme, used for episodes 1-36, is "Muri Muri!? Ari Ari!! In jaa Nai?!" (ムリムリ！？ありあり！！INじゃあな～い？！; "No Wat!? Unbelievable!! Is That Okay?!") by Mayumi Gojo with Young Fresh, whilst the second ending theme, used for episodes 37-47 is "Wonder Winter Yatta" (ワンダーウィンターヤッタ, Wandā Wintā Yatta; Wonder Winter Alright) by Gojo. In March 2013, the anime was later re-aired on TV Asahi's cable channel, TeleAsa Channel 1.

=== Films ===
Two animated films based on the Max Heart series were released. The first, Futari wa Pretty Cure Max Heart the Movie (映画 ふたりはプリキュア Max Heart, Eiga Futari wa Purikyua Makkusu Haato), was released on April 16, 2005.

The second movie, Futari wa Pretty Cure Max Heart 2: Friends of the Snow-Laden Sky (映画 ふたりはプリキュア Max Heart 2 雪空のともだち, Eiga Futari wa Purikyua Makkusu Haato 2: Yukizora no Tomodachi), was released December 10, 2005.

The heroines also appear in all Pretty Cure All Stars movies, which ran between 2009 and 2016. Another crossover film, HUG! Pretty Cure Futari wa Pretty Cure: All Stars Memories, was released on October 27, 2018, celebrating the franchise's 15th anniversary.

=== Licensed media and dubs ===
On February 24, 2006, 4Kids Entertainment announced it had acquired the broadcasting and distribution rights for Pretty Cure in the United States, but would ultimately never release the show. In July 2008, Toei Animation began making episodes available through IGN's Direct2Drive service subtitled into English across Canada and the U.S., and would later stream them on Crunchyroll that same year, on Funimation in April 2009 and on Tubi in April 2017. The subtitles were produced by Nippon Golden Network, a Hawaii-based cable network that broadcasts Asian programming (mostly from Japan), which had aired the show in 2008. Toei's initial uploads featured low-quality video and audio, which were replaced on Crunchyroll with higher quality footage and updated subtitles in March 2021 when the service added the series in more regions.

An English dub produced by Voiceovers Unlimited for Odex debuted on Kids Central in Singapore between April 1, 2006, and March 3, 2007. A dub of Max Heart followed from July 21, 2007. A separate English dub of the first season was produced by Toei and Ocean Productions using their Blue Water studio in Calgary, Alberta which aired on Canada's YTV channel from March 6, 2009, to July 31, 2010. It later aired in the United Kingdom on Pop Girl starting September 6, 2010. The series was also sold to Cartoon Network in Australia and New Zealand. The dub began streaming on Toei's YouTube channel in North America, Australia, New Zealand, South Africa and Latin America as part of the "Summer Weekend Splash" live event from June 28 to September 20, 2025. It was added to Hulu in the United States on February 24, 2026.

=== Manga ===
Both the television series and their movies received manga adaptation which were illustrated by Futago Kamikita in Kodansha's Nakayoshi magazine as they aired.

=== Video games ===
Four video games based on the two series have been released in Japan by Bandai. An educational video game was released for the Sega Pico in 2004. A puzzle platformer, Futari wa Pretty Cure: Arienai! Yume no Sono wa Daimeikyu (ふたりはプリキュア ありえな～い！夢の園は大迷宮; lit. We are Pretty Cure: Unbelievable! The Garden of Dreams is a Big Mystery), was released for Game Boy Advance in 2004. A platformer, Futari wa Pretty Cure: Max Heart – Maji? Maji!? Fight de IN Janai (ふたりはプリキュア マックスハート マジ？マジ？！ファイト de INじゃない, Futari wa Pretty Cure: Max Heart – Maji? Maji!? Faito de IN Janai; We are Pretty Cure: Max Heart Seriously? Seriously!? A Fight's Okay, Right?) was released for Game Boy Advance in 2005. A side-scrolling beat 'em up game, Futari wa Precure Max Heart: Danzen! DS de Precure (Chikara o Awasete Dai Battle!!) (ふたりはプリキュアMH DANZEN！DSでプリキュア 力をあわせて大バトル！!, Futari wa Purikyua MH: Danzen! DS de Purikyua (Chikara o Awasete Dai Batoru!!); lit. We are Pretty Cure Max Heart: Danzen! Precure DS (The Big Battle for Power!!)) was also released in 2005 for the Nintendo DS.

In Puyo Puyo Quest, featuring the characters in the Hikari's Heart Festival and Skybloom Festival event.

== Reception ==
The series' popularity quickly spawned it into a full franchise with many different series. In a TV Asahi opinion poll, Pretty Cure appeared in the 45th position, above other series of the magical girl genre like Cutie Honey (technically not a "magical girl" series in the same sense; see article for details), Cardcaptor Sakura, and Magical Angel Creamy Mami.

Preceded by none	Pretty Cure (2004 TV Series) / (Max Heart); 2004-2006	Succeeded by PreCure Splash Star
