= PreCure Splash Star =

Japanese anime television series

- Cover of the second DVD boxset by MarvelousAQL, featuring Saki Hyuga in her Cure Bright form, Mai Mishou in her Cure Windy form, Moop and Foop and the Kiryu Sisters.

ふたりはプリキュア Splash Star (Futari wa Purikyua Supurasshu Sutā)
- Created by: Izumi Todo
- Anime television series
- Directed by: Toshiaki Komura
- Written by: Seiko Nagatsu (#1-13); Yoshimi Narita (#14-49)
- Music by: Naoki Satō
- Studio: Toei Animation
- Licensed by: Crunchyroll
- Original network: ANN (ABC, TV Asahi)
- Original run: February 5, 2006 – January 28, 2007
- Episodes: 49
- Manga
- Written by: Izumi Todo
- Illustrated by: Futago Kamikita
- Published by: Kodansha
- Magazine: Nakayoshi
- Original run: March 2006 – February 2007
- Video game

PreCure Splash☆Star: Panpaka Game Never Better!
- Developer: Namco Bandai Games
- Publisher: Namco Bandai Games
- Genre: Side-scrolling beat 'em up
- Platform: Nintendo DS
- Released: November 30, 2006
- Anime film

PreCure Splash☆Star the Movie: Tic-Tac Crisis Hanging by a Thin Thread!
- Directed by: Junji Shimizu
- Written by: Yoshimi Narita
- Studio: Toei Animation
- Released: December 9, 2006
- icon

PreCure Splash Star (ふたりはプリキュア Splash Star, Futari wa Purikyua Supurasshu Sutā; lit. 'We Are PreCure Splash Star'), sometimes written as Pretty Cure Splash☆Star, (Note: Toei will occasionally include a "☆" in the title, like how depicted in its logo.) is a Japanese anime television series produced by Toei Animation that aired on TV Asahi between February 5, 2006, and January 28, 2007. It is the third series in Izumi Todo's Pretty Cure metaseries, and follows a new story different from the previous two series that features the second generation of Cures. The series is directed by Toshiaki Komura, who previously directed Kinnikuman Nisei. The character designs were done by Akira Inagami, who previously worked on the character designs for the previous installments. It was succeeded by Yes! PreCure 5 and Yes! PreCure 5 Go Go!'s time slot. The series' main motif is based on Nature, with its concept deriving from the Japanese idiom "flower, bird, wind, moon" (花鳥風月, kachōfūgetsu), which symbolizes the beauty of nature and the traditional themes of natural beauty in Japanese aesthetics.

== Plot ==
Saki Hyuga and Mai Mishou met for the first time when they were both nine years old, after they followed two glowing balls that flew towards the Sky Tree, a big tree situated atop a mountain in their town. Five years later, they reunite at the Sky Tree and meet Flappy and Choppy, spirits from the Land of Fountains who reveal that they were the glowing balls they saw that day and that they were chosen to protect the Fountains hidden in their world, which they refer to as the Land of Fountains. Through Flappy and Choppy's power, Saki and Mai become Cure Bloom and Cure Egret respectively, and later on gain new forms called Cure Bright and Cure Windy from the power of the two spirits Moop and Fuup. Together, they fight against Dark Fall, who are searching for the Fountain of Sun, the last of the seven fountains that are connected to the World Tree - the source of life in all worlds. The leader of Dark Fall has set his sights on the Tree, and it is the Pretty Cure's job to protect it.

In the Splash Star movie, Sirlion, a warrior from Dark Fall, opens up a gateway to the Land of Clocks using directions from Mai. He plans to freeze time by halting the Eternal (Infinite) Clock, which will cut off everyone's future. Saki and Mai were in disagreement after Saki overslept and Mai wandered into a nearby clock store, causing them to miss the sign-up for the karaoke singing contest. After being thrown into an endless maze, Saki and Mai have to work together to solve the maze's puzzles.

== Characters ==
=== Pretty Cures ===
The Splash Star Pretty Cures are warriors chosen by the Land of Fountains to restore the Seven Holy Fountains and prevent Dark Fall from taking over the Land of Greenery. They both transform using the Mix Commune (ミックス・コミューン, Mikkusu komyūn) through the phrase "Dual Spiritual Power" (デュアル・スピリチュアル・パワー！, Duaru Supirichuaru Pawā!). Later on in the series, both Saki and Mai transform using the Splash Commune (スプラッシュ・コミューン, Supurasshu komyūn), harnessing the powers of Moop and Fuup. After transforming, the duo introduces themselves with "We are Pretty Cure!" (ふたりはプリキュア!, Futari wa Purikyua!) with Mai saying "Those who defiled the Holy Fountains!" (聖なる泉を汚す者よ!, Seinaru izumi o yogosu mono yo!) and Saki saying "We're here to stop your cruel behavior!" (アコギな真似はお止めなさい!, Akogina mane wa oyamenasai!).

Saki Hyuga (日向 咲, Hyūga Saki) / Cure Bloom (キュアブルーム, Kyua Burūmu) / Cure Bright (キュアブライト, Kyua Buraito)
Voiced by: Orie Kimoto
Saki is a 13/14-year-old girl who is cheerful and athletic. Like Nagisa, Saki is excellent at sports, being a member of the girls' softball team at Yuunagi Middle School, is not good at academics and has a huge appetite, just like Nagisa. Unlike Nagisa, Saki has a mild personality and has a habit of saying "I'm on top form!" (絶好調！, Zekkōchō!) when she is excited. Saki is bright and energetic, and remains positive even when facing the darkest situations. Although Saki appears childish at times, she is sociable and gregarious, and her cheerful and outgoing personality often cheers up others. Her family runs the Panpaka Pan bakery, which she works at; she is good at cooking and making delicious bread. She has a sister named Minori, who she shares a room with and is often annoyed by. Saki also has a crush on Mai's older brother, Kazuya.
As Cure Bloom and Cure Bright, her short auburn hair becomes bright reddish blonde and is worn with a headband. As Cure Bloom, her theme color is pink and her secondary colour is gold and she represents the earth, and as Cure Bright her theme color is yellow and her secondary colour is green and she represents the moon.
She introduces herself as "The shining golden flower, Cure Bloom!" (輝く金の花, キュアブルーム!, Kagayaku kin no hana, Kyua Burūmu!) while as Cure Bright, she introduces herself as "The full moon in the sky, Cure Bright!" (天空に満ちる月, キュアブライト!, Tenkū ni michiru tsuki, Kyua Buraito!).
Mai Mishou (美翔 舞, Mishō Mai) / Cure Egret (キュアイーグレット, Kyua Īguretto) / Cure Windy (キュアウィンディ, Kyua Windi)
Voiced by: Atsuko Enomoto
Saki's childhood friend since at the age of 9. Mai is a 13/14-year-old girl who likes art and has a gentle and calm nature. Her father is an astronomer, her mother is an archeologist, and her brother, Kazuya, aspires to be an astronaut when he grows up. She and her family live in an observatory. Mai is very observant and aware, often noticing subtle details that others would easily miss.
As Cure Egret and Cure Windy, her long dark blue hair becomes dark purple and is worn in a long ponytail. As Cure Egret, her theme color is white and her secondary colour is silver and she represents the sky, and as Cure Windy her theme color is blue and her secondary colour is pink and she represents the wind.
She introduces herself as "The sparkling silver wing, Cure Egret!" (煌めく銀の翼, キュアイーグレット!, Kirameku gin no tsubasa, Kyua Īguretto!) while as Cure Windy, she introduces herself as "The scented wind on the earth, Cure Windy!" (大地に薫る風, キュアウィンディ!, Daichi ni kaoru kaze, Kyua Windi!)

=== Land of Fountains ===
Flappy (フラッピ, Furappi)
Voiced by: Kappei Yamaguchi
The spirit of the flower, who likes to eat rice and ends his sentences with the phrase "lapi". He seemingly has a crush on Choppy, but she is either unaware of or doesn't understand his feelings for her. He functions as Saki's transformation device, allowing her to transform into Cure Bloom and Cure Bright.
Choppy (チョッピ, Choppi)
Voiced by: Miyu Matsuki
The spirit of the bird, who ends her sentences with the phrase "chopi". She functions as Mai's transformation device, allowing her to transform into Cure Egret and Cure Windy.
Moop (ムープ, Mūpu)
Voiced by: Yuriko Fuchizaki
A mysterious spirit of the moon that first appears in episode 24 and has some connection to Michiru, as the Kiryuu sisters once rescued Moop and Fuup from a falling tree at the Fountain of Sky. "Muu" comes from "Moon" (ムーン, Mūn). He ends his sentences with the phrase "mupu".
Fuup (フープ, Fūpu)
Voiced by: Akemi Okamura
A mysterious spirit of the wind that first appears in episode 24 along with Moop and has some connection to Kaoru, as the Kiryuu sisters once rescued Moop and Fuup from a falling tree at the Fountain of Sky. She ends her sentences with the phrase "pupu". Moop and Foop can use the powers of the moon and wind to power up the Pretty Cure with the Spiral Ring Set, and later serve as the power sources for Cure Bright and Cure Windy.
Princess Filia (フィーリア王女, Fīria Ōjo)
Voiced by: Taeko Kawata
The princess of the Land of Fountains, who appears each time the Pretty Cure duo restores a Fountain and leaves them a keyword about what will happen in the future before vanishing. In the last episode, Flappy reveals that Filia's true identity is the spirit of the World Tree.

=== Dark Fall ===
Throughout the whole series, Pretty Cure's enemies are the villains of Dark Fall (ダークフォール, Dāku Fōru). In episode 41, Goyan used the Fairy Carafe to bring the previously killed villains (except Michiru and Kaoru) back to life to defeat Pretty Cure.

Akudaikaan (アクダイカーン, Akudaikān)
Voiced by: Takayuki Godai
The evil ruler of Dark Fall, who seeks to take over the World Tree, and has managed to capture six of the seven Fountains that are connected to it. He has sent out minions to search for the location of the last of these fountains, the Fountain of Sun. He appears as a shadowy towering demon-like being wearing robes, with glowing red eyes that shine out of the cave in which he lives. In the series' final battle, it is revealed that Goyan created him and Dark Fall as a tool, and that Goyan is the true villain.
Goyan (ゴーヤーン, Gōyān)
Voiced by: Toshiyuki Morikawa
Akudaikaan's aide, who Ms, Shitataare calls "Gōchan". Before his battle against the girls, he appears to be polite, yet mean and vicious, and the Dark Fall minions often mock him. It is later revealed in episode 47 that he created Akudaikaan as a tool, and that his true intent is to destroy the universe and all its life. After killing Akudaikaan, he transforms into a gigantic monster and turns the Land of Greenery into a wasteland, then has a fierce battle against the girls. He almost kills Cure Bloom and Cure Egret by taking them with him, but they defeat him with the Pretty Cure Spiral Heart Splash Star.
Karehaan (カレハーン, Karehān)
Voiced by: Isshin Chiba
Karehaan is the first of Dark Fall's members to attack Earth, and is also their weakest member. He is sent to capture Flappy and Choppy in order to force them to tell where the Fountain of Sun is. When they refuse to reply, he begins to harm them until Saki and Mai step in and transform for the first time. He attacks the Pretty Cure with wood-related Uzainaa. In episode 7, the Cures defeat him and he returns to his original form of dead leaves, but he is later resurrected in episode 42 along with the other generals of Dark Fall. However, he is defeated in the same episode. His name is often mispronounced as "Curry-pan", much to his displeasure.
Moerumba (モエルンバ, Moerunba)
Voiced by: Keiichi Nanba
Moerumba is the second of Dark Fall's members to attack Earth, after Karehaan's defeat. His appearance is based on Brazilian carnival dancers. He is feminine, speaks Spanish, such as calling the Pretty Cure "Señorita" ("young lady"), and loves to dance and snap his fingers. He attacks the Pretty Cure with fire-related Uzainaa. He is defeated in episode 13 and returns to his original form of flames and glass, but is later resurrected in episode 42 along with the other generals of Dark Fall. He is then defeated once more in episode 43. Episode 41 has him flirt with Karehaan, who doesn't appreciate it.
Dorodoron (ドロドロン, Dorodoron)
Voiced by: Mitsuo Iwata
Dorodoron is the third of Dark Fall's members to attack Earth, after Moerumba's defeat. He resembles an arachnid and prefers to travel underground. He transforms earth-related objects such as rocks and cobblestone into Uzainaa. He also occasionally takes advice from Michiru and Kaoru, despite his ire against them for attacking when he is supposed to. He is defeated in episode 20 and returns to his original form of soil, but is later resurrected in episode 42 along with the other generals of Dark Fall. He is then defeated once more in episode 44.
Ms. Shitataare (ミズ·シタターレ, Mizu Shitatāre)
Voiced by: Naoko Matsui
Ms. Shitataare is the fourth of Dark Fall's members to attack Earth, after Michiru and Kaoru. She dresses in a modern adaption of a Hanfu mixed with a high-slit dress and manipulates water, which she also usually turns into Uzainaa. According to Moop and Foop, she was responsible for destroying the Fountain of Water and the Fountain of Sky. The Pretty Cure duo' receive their power-ups, the Spiral Ring Set and the Bright/Windy form, while she is the main villain. Saki calls her "Hanamizu-taare", derived from hanamizu, which means nasal mucus. She's later reveals that Michiru and Kaoru are still alive at Dark Fall, despite having seemingly died. She is seemingly ambitious and obsessed with her career as a minion of Dark Fall, and uses several tricks and disguises against the Pretty Cure. Despite this, she helped them to infiltrate Dark Fall in episode 30 since she believes she is the only one allowed to defeat them and won't let Goyan do so. In episode 32, she is defeated and returns to her original form of water, but is later resurrected in episode 42 along with the other generals of Dark Fall. She, along with Kintoleski, are defeated once more in episode 45.
Kintoleski (キントレスキー, Kintoresukī)
Voiced by: Jūrōta Kosugi
The last of Dark Fall's members to appear, after Ms. Shitataare's defeat. He is the strongest member of Dark Fall and has skin that is gold in color. He likes to exercise and work out, and so respects strong opponents, seemingly preferring his rivalry with the Pretty Cure over his mission to defeat them. He often buys bread from Saki's family bakery and occasionally provides guidance to the girls. He is defeated in episode 40 and returns to his original form of gold dust, but is later resurrected in episode 42 along with the other generals of Dark Fall. He, along with Ms. Shitataare, are defeated once more in episode 45, but not before confessing his love for her.
Michiru Kiryuu (霧生満, Kiryū Michiru) / Cure Bright (キュアブライト, Kyua Buraito)
Voiced by: Yuriko Fuchizaki
Kaoru's younger sister. A girl with short red hair and red eyes who first appears in episode 14 along with Kaoru. She is later revealed to be a member of Dark Fall tasked with guarding the Fountain of Sky alongside her older sister. Upon infiltrating the Land of Greenery as transfer students, she and Kaoru soon learn the meaning of their names, with "霧" meaning "fog" and "生" meaning "life, birth". In episode 23, she and Kaoru sacrifice themselves to save Saki and Mai from Akudaikaan and send them back to the Land of Greenery. She is later revived in episode 42 through the Fairy Carafe's power, turning into Cure Bright, and assists the Pretty Cure in defeating the Dark Fall and Goyan. Like Saki, as Cure Bright, her theme color is yellow and she represents the moon.
Kaoru Kiryuu (霧生薫, Kiryū Kaoru) / Cure Windy (キュアウィンディ, Kyua Windi)
Voiced by: Yuka Imai (ep 14-19), Voiced by: Akemi Okamura (ep 20 onwards)
Michiru's older sister. A girl with long blue hair and blue eyes who first appears in episode 14 along with Michiru. She is later revealed to be a member of Dark Fall tasked with guarding the Fountain of Sky alongside her younger sister. She and Michiru infiltrate Yuunagi Junior High School as transfer students to gather information about the Pretty Cure, but gradually befriend them. In episode 23, she and Michiru sacrifice themselves to save Saki and Mai from Akudaikaan. She is later revived in episode 42 through the Fairy Carafe's power, turning into Cure Windy, and assists the Pretty Cure in defeating Dark Fall and Goyan. Like Mai, as Cure Windy, her theme color is blue and she represents the wind.
Uzainaa (ウザイナー, Uzainā)
Voiced by: Hideo Watanabe
Uzainaa are monsters that are fused with objects, with different members of Dark Fall fusing them with objects pertaining to different elements, such as Karehaan using wood-related Uzainaa. When defeated, element spirits are released from them and thank the Pretty Cure for freeing them.

=== Cures' families ===
Daisuke Hyuga (日向 大介, Hyūga Daisuke)
Voiced by: Naomi Kusumi
Saki and Minori's father, who owns a bakery called PANPAKA.
Saori Hyuga (日向 沙織, Hyūga Saori)
Voiced by: Mika Doi
Saki and Minori's mother, who is a bread craftsman at PANPAKA.
Minori Hyuga (日向 みのり, Hyūga Minori)
Voiced by: Ayaka Saito
Saki's younger sister.
Korone (コロネ, Korone)
Voiced by: Hideo Watanabe
Saki's cat, who she adopted five years before the series.
Kouichirou Mishou (美翔 弘一郎, Mishō Kōichirō)
Voiced by: Takashi Irie
Mai's father, who is a notable astronomer.
Kanako Mishou (美翔 可南子, Mishō Kanako)
Voiced by: Yumi Kusaka
Mai's mother, who is an archaeologist.
Kazuya Mishou (美翔 和也, Mishō Kazuya)
Voiced by: Kenji Nojima
Mai's elder brother, who admires her and aspires to be an astronaut.

=== Yuunagi Middle School ===
Yuunagi Middle School (夕凪中学校, Yūnagi Chūgakkō) is a junior high school that the Cures attend.

Shinohara (篠原)
Voiced by: Hyo-sei
An English teacher who is the Cures' homeroom teacher and advisor to the softball club.
Kenta Hoshino (ホシノケンタ, Hoshino Kenta)
Voiced by: Junko Takeuchi
Saki's friend.
Hitomi Itou (伊東 仁美, Itō Hitomi)
Voiced by: Ryoko Ono
A member of the softball team alongside Saki.
Yūko Outa (太田 優子, Ōta Yūko)
Voiced by: Masako Jo
Saki and Mai's classmate.
Ayano Takeuchi (竹内 彩乃, Takeuchi Ayano)
Voiced by: Sayori Ishizuka
Mai's friend and a member of the Art Club.
Kayo Andou (安藤 加代, Andō Kayo)
Voiced by: Akiko Nakagawa
A classmate of the Cures who is a student counsellor.
Izumida (泉田, Izumida)
Voiced by: Shizuka Ito
A classmate of the Cures and the captain of the softball club Saki is in.

== Media ==
=== Anime ===
The series is produced by Toei Animation and Asahi Broadcasting Corporation, having been broadcast across Japan via ABC and other ANN stations from February 5, 2006, to January 28, 2007. The opening theme for all of the episodes is "Makasete★Splash☆Star★" (まかせて★スプラッシュ☆スター★, Makasete Supurasshu☆Sutā; "Leave it to Us Splash☆Star") by Yuka Uchiyae with Splash Stars. The ending theme used in episodes 1-30 is "'Warau ga Kachi' de GO!" (「笑うが勝ち!」でGO!, "Warau ga Kachi de Gō!; "'Laugh and Win!' GO!") by Mayumi Gojo, and the ending theme for episode 31 and onwards is "Ganbalance de Dance" (ガンバランスdeダンス, Ganbaransu de Dansu) also by Mayumi Gojo with Flappy and Choppy.

The series premiered in English for the first time on Crunchyroll on August 27, 2024, with a full subtitled release of the original series.

Marvelous AQL also released several DVDs of the series before later being compiled into two DVD-Box sets by Pony Canyon. The first boxset is released on September 19, 2012, and the second on October 17, 2012.

=== Films ===
A movie titled PreCure Splash☆Star Tick Tack Kiki Ippatsu! (ふたりはプリキュア スプラッシュ☆スター チクタク危機一髪!; lit. We Are PreCure Splash☆Star Tic-Tac Crisis Hanging by a Thin Thread!) was released on December 9, 2006.

The heroines also appear in all Pretty Cure All Stars movies, starting with Pretty Cure All Stars DX: Everyone's Friends - the Collection of Miracles! (プリキュアオールスターズDX みんなともだちっ☆奇跡の全員大集合!, PuriKyua Ōru Sutāzu Dirakkusu: Minna Tomodachi☆Kiseki no Zenin Daishūgō) (Released on March 14, 2009)

== Video game ==
A side-scrolling beat-em-up video game, Futari wa PreCure Splash Star: Panpaka game deji kojo! (ふたりはプリキュア Splash Star パンパカゲームでぜっこうちょう!) was released by Bandai for the Nintendo DS on November 30, 2006.

== Notes ==
Preceded by Pretty Cure Max Heart	PreCure Splash Star; 2006–2007	Succeeded by Yes! PreCure 5
