= Yoshimi Narita =

Japanese screenwriter (born 1973)

- 成田 良美
- Born: April 3, 1973 (age 53); Aichi Prefecture, Japan
- Occupation: Anime screenwriter
- Writing career
- Years active: 1997–present
- Notable works: Ojamajo Doremi series; Pretty Cure series; Dakaichi; Dance Dance Danseur; Shikimori's Not Just a Cutie

Japanese name
- Kanji: 成田 良美
- Hiragana: なりた よしみ
- Romanization: Narita Yoshimi

Yoshimi Narita (Japanese: 成田 良美, Hepburn: Narita Yoshimi; born April 3, 1973) is a Japanese anime screenwriter, who is mostly known for writing Ojamajo Doremi and Pretty Cure series, as well as Kokuhaku Jikkō Iinkai: Ren'ai Series, Dakaichi, Dance Dance Danseur and Shikimori's Not Just a Cutie. Narita is a member of the Writers Guild of Japan.

== Career ==
Narita debuted as an anime screenwriter in 1997, writing various episodes for Dr. Slump.

After concluding her work on the Ojamajo Doremi series in 2003, she then started writing scripts for various episodes for the Pretty Cure series since Pretty Cure in 2004, and acted as a lead writer for six of its series since then; PreCure Splash Star, Yes! PreCure 5, Yes! PreCure 5 GoGo! HappinessCharge PreCure!, Power of Hope: PreCure Full Bloom and Wonderful Pretty Cure!, as well as six movies.

Outside of the Pretty Cure series, Narita worked as a lead writer for the second season of Saint Seiya Omega, Kokuhaku Jikkō Iinkai: Ren'ai Series, Dance Dance Danseur, Shikimori's Not Just a Cutie, and Twilight Out of Focus. Narita is also a member of the Writers Guild of Japan.

== Filmography ==
=== TV Anime ===
Year	Title	Credit	Note
1997-99	Dr. Slump	Script (eps. 4, 7, 10, 13-14, 17, 20, 22, 24, 26, 29, 37, 40, 46, 49-50, 56, 60-61, 65-66, 71, 74)	
2000-01	Ojamajo Doremi Sharp	Script (eps. 14, 18, 25, 28, 33, 36, 41, 48)	
2002-03	Ojamajo Doremi Dokkān!	Script (eps. 3, 10, 16, 20-21, 26, 32, 36, 41, 46)	
2004-05	Digimon Frontier	Script (eps. 4, 16, 20, 25, 30, 36, 41, 48)	
2004-05	Pretty Cure	Script (eps. 10, 13, 17, 26, 30, 35, 40, 43, 49)	
2005-06	Pretty Cure Max Heart	Script (eps. 2, 7, 11, 16, 21, 36, 45)	
2006-07	PreCure Splash Star	Series Composition (eps. 14-49), Script (eps. 2, 5, 9, 14, 18, 23-24, 30, 34, 41-42, 49)	
2007-08	Yes! PreCure 5	Series Composition, Script (eps. 1-2, 7, 11, 16, 23-24, 31, 35, 39, 45, 49)	
2008	Kemeko Deluxe!	Series Composition, Script (eps. 3, 5-6, 11-12)	
2008-09	Yes! PreCure 5 GoGo!	Series Composition, Script (eps. 1-2, 7, 13, 18, 24, 30, 38, 43, 47-48)	
2009-10	Fresh Pretty Cure!	Script (eps. 7, 13, 19, 22, 28, 33, 39, 46)	
2010-11	HeartCatch PreCure!	Script (eps. 5, 9, 14, 23-24, 28, 32, 39, 43)	
2011-12	Suite PreCure	Script (eps. 6, 11, 15, 19, 22, 26, 30, 34, 39, 44, 46)	
2012-13	Smile PreCure!	Script (eps. 11, 13, 16, 24, 27, 29, 35-36, 39, 43, 46-47)	
2013-14	Saint Seiya Omega	Series Composition (eps. 52-97), Script (eps. 52-53, 58, 65, 68)	Season 2
2013-14	Dokidoki! PreCure	Script (eps. 8, 12, 16, 19, 24, 31)	
2014-15	HappinessCharge Pretty Cure!	Series Composition, Script (eps. 21-22)	
2015-16	Go! Princess Pretty Cure	Script (eps. 14, 16, 21, 25, 31, 33, 36, 44-45)	
2016-18	Aikatsu Stars!	Script (eps. 3, 6, 11, 14, 19, 26, 32, 37, 43, 47, 52, 60, 65, 73, 80, 92, 97-98)	
2018	Dakaichi	Series Composition, Script (eps. 1-3, 9, 11-13)	
2018-19	Aikatsu Friends!	Script (eps. 34, 44, 48)	
2018-19	Hug! PreCure	Script (eps. 15)	
2019	Aikatsu Friends! Brilliant Jewel	Script (eps. 2, 8, 15, 20)	
2019-20	Aikatsu on Parade!	Script (eps. 2, 6, 19)	
2021-22	Tropical-Rouge! Pretty Cure	Script (eps. 10, 13, 20, 40)	
2022	Dance Dance Danseur	Series Composition, Script (eps. 1-4, 10-11)	
2022	Shikimori's Not Just a Cutie	Series Composition, Script (eps. 1, 3, 12)	
2023	Power of Hope: PreCure Full Bloom	Series Composition, Script (eps. 1-2, 5, 7, 10-12)	
2023-24	Soaring Sky! Pretty Cure	Script (eps. 28, 34, 41)	
2024	Twilight Out of Focus	Series Composition, Script (eps. 1-4, 8-9, 11-12)	
2024-25	Wonderful Pretty Cure!	Series Composition, Script (eps. 1-4, 6-7, 16, 18-19, 23, 29-30, 36, 39, 45, 48-50)	
2025	Let's Go Karaoke!	Series Composition	
2025	Captivated, by You	Series Composition	
2026	The Villainess Is Adored by the Prince of the Neighbor Kingdom	Series Composition	
2026	Star Detective Precure!	Script (eps. 8, 9, 14, 17)	

=== Anime film ===
Year	Title	Credit	Note
2005	Pretty Cure Max Heart the Movie 2: Friends of the Snow-Laden Sky	Screenplay	
2006	PreCure Splash Star: Tick-Tock Crisis Hanging by a Thin-Thread!	Screenplay	
2007	Yes! PreCure 5 the Movie: Great Miraculous Adventure in the Mirror Kingdom!	Screenplay	
2008	Yes! PreCure 5 GoGo! the Movie: Happy Birthday in the Sweets Kingdom	Screenplay	
2012	Pretty Cure All Stars New Stage: Friends of the Future	Screenplay	
2013	Pretty Cure All Stars New Stage 2: Friends of the Heart	Screenplay	
2014	Pretty Cure All Stars New Stage 3: Eternal Friends	Screenplay	
2014	HappinessCharge PreCure! the Movie: The Ballerina of the Land of Dolls	Screenplay	
2016	I've Always Liked You	Screenplay	
2016	The Moment You Fall in Love	Screenplay	
2020	LIP×LIP FILM×LIVE	Screenplay	
2021	Tropical-Rouge! Pretty Cure the Movie: The Snow Princess and the Miraculous Ring!	Screenplay	
2021	Dakaichi: Spain Arc	Screenplay	
2026	Star Detective Precure! The Movie: The Mysterious Garden and a Secret Pair	Screenplay	

=== OVA (Original Video Animations) ===
Year	Title	Credit	Note
2004	Ojamajo Doremi Na-i-sho	Script (eps. 3, 5-6, 11)	
