= Pretty Cure All Stars New Stage 2: Friends of the Heart =

2013 film by Kōji Ogawa

- Kanji: 映画 プリキュアオールスターズ New Stage 2 こころのともだち
- Revised Hepburn: Eiga PuriKyua Ōru Sutāzu Nyū Sutēji Tsū: Kokoro no Tomodachi
- Directed by: Kōji Ogawa
- Screenplay by: Yoshimi Narita
- Based on: Pretty Cure by Izumi Todo
- Starring: Hitomi Nabatame; Minako Kotobuki; Mai Fuchigami; Kanako Miyamoto; Misato Fukuen; Asami Tano; Hisako Kanemoto; Marina Inoue; Chinami Nishimura; Ikue Ōtani
- Cinematography: Kenji Takahashi
- Edited by: Yoshihiro Aso
- Music by: Yasuharu Takanashi
- Production company: Toei Animation
- Distributed by: Toei Company, Ltd.
- Release date: March 16, 2013
- Running time: 71 minutes
- Country: Japan
- Language: Japanese
- Box office: US$10,125,112

Pretty Cure All Stars New Stage 2: Friends of the Heart (Japanese: 映画 プリキュアオールスターズ New Stage 2 こころのともだち, Hepburn: Eiga PuriKyua Ōru Sutāzu Nyū Sutēji Tsū: Kokoro no Tomodachi) is a 2013 Japanese animated action fantasy film based on the Pretty Cure franchise created by Izumi Todo. The film is directed by Kōji Ogawa, written by Yoshimi Narita, and produced by Toei Animation. The film was released in Japan on March 16, 2013.

Marking the fifth entry to the Pretty Cure All Stars crossover film series, as well as the second installment to the New Stage trilogy, the DokiDoki! PreCure team joins the previous Pretty Cure teams to stop a malicious shadow from attacking the Fairy Academy.

== Plot ==
In a far off school called Fairy Academy, Tart gives a lecture to fellow fairy students about the Pretty Cures. Meanwhile, a rowdy fairy named Grell and a shy fairy named En-En are called towards a forbidden tree, where a being taking the form of Grell's Shadow, who takes interest in hearing that the Cures are simply normal girls if they can't transform and convinces Grell he would be famous if he could obtain their transformation items. Shortly afterwards, the Pretty Cure teams receive invitations to come to the Fairy Academy for a party, while Smile PreCure! teams: Miyuki, Akane, Yayoi, Nao and Reika contacts DokiDoki! PreCure teams: Mana, Rikka, Alice and Makoto about the party, which Mana happily accepts the invitation.

Meanwhile, at Fairy Academy, Shadow coerces Grell into capturing the Cures' fairy partners and transformation items, leaving them defenseless against attacking shadow monsters. After majority of the Pretty Cures are defeated in this manner, Shadow turns his attention towards the Smile teams, using a Pretty Cure guidebook to counter their every move and steal their transformation items before imprisoning them in statues like the others. As En-En laments helping Shadow, Miyuki tells him not to worry and asks him to seek out help from the DokiDoki! teams before being encapsulated herself. With assumedly no more Pretty Cures in his way, Shadow reveals his true intentions to destroy the academy and imprison all of its students, much to Grell's shock. Grell and En-En manage to find the DokiDoki! teams and ask for their help in defeating Shadow.

As the Cures fight Shadow's minions, Grell and En-En, assisted by Candy and Pop, manage to find the captured fairies. With the help from the fairy students and the Miracle Lights, they help return the stolen transformation items to the other Cures, allowing them to transform again and restore light to the fairy world. With support from the fairies, the Pretty Cures team up to fight against Shadow. As a last resort, Shadow combines all of his strength to become a giant spider, but he is ultimately defeated by the combined might of the Pretty Cures, reduced to his original size in the process. Realizing the error of his ways, Grell befriends his shadow, who returns to his rightful place. As Grell and En-En become determined to become fairies of the Pretty Cures, the Cures help repair the academy before having a proper party.

== Voice cast ==
DokiDoki! PreCure cast

- Hitomi Nabatame as Mana Aida/Cure Heart
- Minako Kotobuki as Rikka Hishikawa/Cure Diamond
- Mai Fuchigami as Alice Yotsuba/Cure Rosetta
- Kanako Miyamoto as Makoto Kenzaki/Cure Sword
- Kumiko Nishihara as Sharuru
- Yuka Terasaki as Raquel
- Ayaka Ōhashi as Lance
- Yumi Uchiyama as Davi

Smile PreCure! cast

- Misato Fukuen as Miyuki Hoshizora/Cure Happy
- Asami Tano as Akane Hino/Cure Sunny
- Hisako Kanemoto as Yayoi Kise/Cure Peace
- Marina Inoue as Nao Midorikawa/Cure March
- Chinami Nishimura as Reika Aoki/Cure Beauty
- Ikue Ōtani as Candy
- Daisuke Sakaguchi as Pop

Suite PreCure cast

- Megumi Toyoguchi as Siren/Ellen Kurokawa/Cure Beat

HeartCatch PreCure! cast

- Nana Mizuki as Tsubomi Hanasaki/Cure Blossom
- Fumie Mizusawa as Erika Kurumi/Cure Marine

Fresh Pretty Cure! cast

- Yuka Komatsu as Setsuna Higashi/Cure Passion
- Taiki Matsuno as Tarte

Futari wa Pretty Cure Max Heart cast

- Yōko Honna as Nagisa Misumi/Cure Black
- Yukana as Honoka Yukishiro/Cure White
- Rie Tanaka as Hikari Kujo/Shiny Luminous
- Tomokazu Seki as Mepple
- Akiko Yajima as Mipple

Film characters

- Sakiko Tamagawa as En-En
- Rikako Aikawa as Grell
- Masami Kikuchi as Fairy Teacher
- Chika Sakamoto as Shadow
- Yukiyo Fujii as Fairy 1
- Chinatsu Akasaki as Fairy 2

== Production ==
In December 2012, it was announced that a new Pretty Cure All Stars film was in development, and will feature characters from DokiDoki! PreCure series. The key staff members from Pretty Cure All Stars New Stage: Friends of the Future returned to their respective positions for the film, with Yoshimi Narita providing the screenplay, and Mitsuru Aoyama in charge of designing the characters and animation director, while Kōji Ogawa had taken over Junji Shimizu's role as a director.

== Release ==
The film was released in theaters in Japan on March 16, 2013.

== Reception ==
=== Box office ===
The film opened at number 3 out of top 10 in the Japanese box office in its opening weekend, later dropped to number 8 during its final week.
