= Pretty Cure All Stars New Stage 3: Eternal Friends =

2014 film by Kōji Ogawa

- Kanji: 映画 プリキュアオールスターズ New Stage 3 永遠のともだち
- Revised Hepburn: Eiga Purikyua Ōru Sutāzu Nyū Sutēji Surī: Eien no Tomodachi
- Directed by: Kōji Ogawa
- Screenplay by: Yoshimi Narita
- Based on: Pretty Cure by Izumi Todo
- Starring: Megumi Nakajima; Megumi Han; Hitomi Nabatame; Minako Kotobuki; Mai Fuchigami; Kanako Miyamoto; Rie Kugimiya
- Cinematography: Ryo Iijima
- Edited by: Yoshihiro Aso
- Music by: Yasuharu Takanashi
- Production company: Toei Animation
- Distributed by: Toei Company, Ltd.
- Release date: March 15, 2014
- Running time: 70 minutes
- Country: Japan
- Language: Japanese
- Box office: US$8,545,151

Pretty Cure All Stars New Stage 3: Eternal Friends (Japanese: 映画 プリキュアオールスターズ New Stage 3 永遠のともだち, Hepburn: Eiga Purikyua Ōru Sutāzu Nyū Sutēji Surī: Eien no Tomodachi) is a 2014 Japanese animated action fantasy film based on the Pretty Cure franchise created by Izumi Todo. The film is directed by Kōji Ogawa, written by Yoshimi Narita, and produced by Toei Animation. The film was released in Japan on March 15, 2014.

Marking the sixth entry to the Pretty Cure All Stars crossover film series, as well as the final installment to the New Stage trilogy, the HappinessCharge PreCure! team joins the previous Pretty Cure teams in order to stop a dream-eating fairy.

== Plot ==
EnEn and Grell from the Fairy Academy are tasked to investigate a new Pretty Cure team called HappinessCharge PreCure! team, and contacts the DokiDoki! PreCure team: Mana, Rikka, Alice, Makoto and Aguri to arrange a meeting. However, Glassun arrives and explains that Megumi and the other children are placed in a mysterious coma. With Blue's help, the girls and Hime enter the world of dreams, where they encounter Yumeta, a dream-eating fairy that are friends of EnEn and Grell. His mother, Māmu appears and cast the girls away from the Dream World, leaving EnEn and Grell's Pretty Cure book behind. Māmu later steals the book from Yumeta and ensnares and traps the Pretty Cures into their own dreams.

Realizing that Megumi and Hime are not affected, they and the fairies infiltrate the Dream World to confront Māmu, but are later captured. Yumeta explains that his mother trapped the children in their dreams, just so that he would not be alone in the Dream World. Megumi and Hime transform and fight off Māmu's nightmares, and other Cures soon wake up from their dreams. With the power of the Miracle Lights and Blue's plead, the Cures join Lovely and Princess to the Dream World, and battles individual nightmares. With everyone's kind words, Yumeta conquers his fear and becomes a true dream-eater, and shows his mother the errors of her way. Māmu regains her senses, but are too weak to sends the nightmares away, and with EnEn and Grell's Miracle Lights, they summon Ayumi, and becomes her partner, who later transform into Cure Echo.

With the help of Echo, and Cure Honey, the Pretty Cures defeat the nightmare, allowing the children to wake up. As Yumeta promises to become a great dream-eater like his mother, EnEn and Grell writes about him, the HappinessCharge team, and Cure Echo.

== Voice cast ==
HappinessCharge PreCure! cast

- Megumi Nakajima as Megumi Aino/Cure Lovely
- Megumi Han as Hime Shirayuki/Cure Princess
- Naoko Matsui as Ribbon
- Shouma Yamamoto as Blue

DokiDoki! PreCure cast

- Hitomi Nabatame as Mana Aida/Cure Heart
- Minako Kotobuki as Rikka Hishikawa/Cure Diamond
- Mai Fuchigami as Alice Yotsuba/Cure Rosetta
- Kanako Miyamoto as Makoto Kenzaki/Cure Sword
- Rie Kugimiya as Aguri Madoka/Cure Ace
- Kumiko Nishihara as Sharuru
- Yuka Terasaki as Raquel
- Ayaka Ōhashi as Lance
- Yumi Uchiyama as Davi
- Yuka Imai as Ai

Smile PreCure! cast

- Misato Fukuen as Miyuki Hoshizora/Cure Happy
- Hisako Kanemoto as Yayoi Kise/Cure Peace
- Marina Inoue as Nao Midorikawa/Cure March

Suite PreCure cast

- Ami Koshimizu as Hibiki Hojo/Cure Melody

HeartCatch PreCure! cast

- Nana Mizuki as Tsubomi Hanasaki/Cure Blossom
- Fumie Mizusawa as Erika Kurumi/Cure Marine

Fresh Pretty Cure! cast

- Kanae Oki as Love Momozono/Cure Peach

Yes! PreCure 5 GoGo! cast

- Yūko Sanpei as Nozomi Yumehara/Cure Dream
- Junko Takeuchi as Rin Natsuki/Cure Rouge
- Mariya Ise as Urara Kasugano/Cure Lemonade
- Ai Nagano as Komachi Akimoto/Cure Mint
- Ai Maeda as Karen Minazuki/Cure Aqua
- Eri Sendai as Milk/Kurumi Mimino/Milky Rose

Futari wa Pretty Cure Splash Star cast

- Orie Kimoto as Saki Hyuga/Cure Bloom/Cure Bright
- Atsuko Enomoto as Mai Mishō/Cure Egret/Cure Windy

Futari wa Pretty Cure Max Heart cast

- Yōko Honna as Nagisa Misumi/Cure Black
- Yukana as Honoka Yukishiro/Cure White

Film characters

- Sakiko Tamagawa as EnEn
- Rikako Aikawa as Grell
- Mamiko Noto as Ayumi Sakagami/Cure Echo
- Konami Yoshida as Yumeta
- Fumi Hirano as Māmu
- Masako Nozawa as Nightmare Beasts
  - Masami Kikuchi as Nightmare Beast (final form)
- Ayame Goriki as Nami

== Production ==
In October 2013, it was announced that a new Pretty Cure All Stars film was in development, and will mark as the final installment to the New Stage trilogy. The film will feature all Pretty Cure teams, including HappinessCharge PreCure!. The key staff members from previous New Stage duology returned for the film: Kōji Ogawa is directing the film at Toei Animation, Yoshimi Narita is providing the screenplay, and Mitsuru Aoyama is designing the characters and providing the animation direction for the film. Actress Ayame Goriki was cast as one of the children, named Nami.

== Release ==
The film was released in theaters in Japan on March 15, 2014.

== Reception ==
=== Box office ===
The film debuted at number 3 out top 10 in the Japanese box office in its opening weekend, and later dropped to number 12 in its sixth weekend.
