= The Villainess Is Adored by the Prince of the Neighbor Kingdom =

Japanese light novel series and its adaptations

- First light novel volume cover

悪役令嬢は隣国の王太子に溺愛される (Akuyaku Reijō wa Ringoku no Ōtaishi ni Dekiai Sareru)
- Genre: Comedy drama; Fantasy
- Novel series
- Written by: Puni-chan
- Published by: Shōsetsuka ni Narō
- Original run: March 17, 2016 – present
- Light novel
- Written by: Puni-chan
- Illustrated by: Akeno Naruse
- Published by: Enterbrain
- Imprint: B's Log Bunko
- Original run: October 15, 2016 – June 15, 2026
- Volumes: 15
- Manga
- Written by: Puni-chan
- Illustrated by: Hoshina
- Published by: Enterbrain
- Imprint: B's Log Comics
- Magazine: B's Log Comic
- Original run: December 5, 2017 – present
- Volumes: 18
- Light novel

Akuyaku Reijō wa Oshi ga Tōto Sugite Kyō mo Shiawase
- Written by: Puni-chan
- Illustrated by: Ryu Sugahara
- Published by: Enterbrain
- Imprint: B's Log Bunko
- Original run: January 15, 2021 – March 15, 2022
- Volumes: 2
- Manga

Akuyaku Reijō wa Oshi ga Tōto Sugite Kyō mo Shiawase
- Written by: Puni-chan
- Illustrated by: Ino Mamaru
- Published by: Enterbrain
- Imprint: B's Log Comics
- Magazine: B's Log Comic
- Original run: January 5, 2021 – May 5, 2023
- Volumes: 3
- Video game
- Developer: Operahouse
- Publisher: Operahouse
- Genre: Visual novel
- Platform: Nintendo Switch, Steam
- Released: March 21, 2024
- Anime television series
- Directed by: Takayuki Hamana
- Written by: Yoshimi Narita
- Music by: Satoshi Hono; Nakano Karin
- Studio: Studio Deen
- Licensed by: Crunchyroll
- Original network: Tokyo MX, KBS Kyoto, Sun TV, BS NTV, AT-X
- Original run: January 11, 2026 – March 29, 2026
- Episodes: 12
- icon

The Villainess Is Adored by the Prince of the Neighbor Kingdom (Japanese: 悪役令嬢は隣国の王太子に溺愛される, Hepburn: Akuyaku Reijō wa Ringoku no Ōtaishi ni Dekiai Sareru) is a Japanese light novel series written by Puni-chan and illustrated by Akeno Naruse. It was originally posted as a web novel on the online publishing platform Shōsetsuka ni Narō beginning in March 2016. Enterbrain later began publishing it as a light novel under their B's Log Bunko imprint in October 2016 until June 2026, with all 15 volumes released as of June 2026. A manga adaptation illustrated by Hoshina began serialization on Enterbrain's B's Log Comic service in December 2017 and has been compiled into 18 tankōbon volumes as of October 2026. A visual novel adaptation developed and published by Operahouse was released for Nintendo Switch and Steam in March 2024. An anime television series adaptation produced by Studio Deen aired from January to March 2026.

== Plot ==
The series follows a Japanese woman who dies in an accident and is reincarnated as Tiararose Lapis Clementille, the antagonist of the otome game Lapis Lazuli Ring. Believing she is about to be exiled after falling out of favor with her fiancé Hartknights Lapis-Lazuli Lacmouth, she is saved when Aquasteed Marineforest, the prince of a neighboring country, takes her to be his fiancée.

== Characters ==
Tiararose Lapis Clementille (ティアラローズ・ラピス・クレメンティール, Tiararōzu Rapisu Kurementīru)
Voiced by: Mai Fuchigami (voice drama, drama CD, PV, anime) (Japanese); Kate Bristol (English)
The villainess of the otome game Lapis Lazuli Ring, who comes from a noble family. In her previous life, she was a Japanese girl who was a fan of otome games. After her death, she finds herself reincarnated in the world of Lapis Lazuli Ring.
Aquasteed Marineforest (アクアスティード・マリンフォレスト, Akuasutīdo Marinforesuto)
Voiced by: Yūichirō Umehara (voice drama, drama CD, PV, anime) (Japanese); Aaron Campbell (English)
The crown prince of the Kingdom of Marineforest, who is studying in the Kingdom of Lapis-Lazuli. He rescues Tiararose from her doomed engagement. Aquasteed is the main character of the sequel game that Tiararose never played, leaving his character shrouded in mystery.
Hartknights Lapis-Lazuli Lacmouth (ハルトナイツ・ラピスラズリ・ラクトムート, Harutonaitsu Rapisurazuri Rakutomūto)
Voiced by: Takuya Satō (voice drama, drama CD, PV, anime) (Japanese); Conner Allison (English)
The crown prince of the Kingdom of Lapis-Lazuli and Tiararose's fiancé. Although he was originally interested in her, he eventually became more interested in Akari instead. In the original game, this would culminate in a bad end for Tiararose.
Akari (アカリ)
Voiced by: Yumiri Hanamori (voice drama, drama CD, PV, anime) (Japanese); Kara Edwards (English)
A transfer student who was the original protagonist of Lapis Lazuli Ring. When Aquasteed came to Tiararose's rescue and proposed to her, Akari began acting out of character to protest the engagement. Akari is revealed to be like Tiararose, who lived a previous life and reincarnated into the world of Lapis Lazuli Ring.
Icilla Pearllant (イシラ・パールラント, Ishira Pāruranto)
Voiced by: Marina Yamada (anime) (Japanese); Reshel Mae (English)
The daughter of a duke in the kingdom of Marinforest, from a ducal family that oversees the oceans, and the heroine of the sequel game where Aquasteed comes from, originally intended to become his lover. She holds a strong connection with the fairies of the sea. Akari had to stop Icilla from acting on her suddenly realized feelings in the day of Tia and Aqua's wedding.
Keith (キース, Kīsu)
Voiced by: Junichi Suwabe (voice drama, drama CD, PV, anime) (Japanese); Bradley Gareth (English)
The King of the forest fairies who develops an obsessive crush on Tiararose. Though he does respect her boundaries when Tia becomes frustrated with him
Claire (クレイル, Kureiru)
Voiced by: Hikaru Midorikawa (anime) (Japanese); Mauricio Ortiz-Segura (English)
The king of the sky fairies and the one who blessed Prince Aquasteed with his magic.
Pearl (パール, Pāru)
Voiced by: Ai Furihata (anime) (Japanese); Kelly Greenshield (English)
The female king of the sea fairies. She rules over them harshly. She sees Tiararose as a rival.

== Media ==
=== Light novel ===
The series was originally posted as a web novel on the online publishing platform Shōsetsuka ni Narō beginning on March 17, 2016. Enterbrain later began publishing it as a light novel under their B's Log Bunko imprint on October 15, 2016, with 15 volumes released as of June 2025. The series ended at the 15th volume. Kadokawa released promotional videos on YouTube to promote the novels. A drama CD was released in December 2020 as part of the limited edition of the seventh volume.

A two-volume spin-off light novel series, titled Akuyaku Reijō wa Oshi ga Tōto Sugite Kyō mo Shiawase (悪役令嬢は推しが尊すぎて今日も幸せ), was published under the same imprint from January 15, 2021, to March 15, 2022.

==== Volumes ====
No.	Release date	ISBN
1	October 15, 2016	978-4-04-728257-5
2	February 15, 2017	978-4-04-734479-2
3	June 15, 2017	978-4-04-734671-0
4	October 13, 2017	978-4-04-734799-1
5	February 15, 2018	978-4-04-734800-4
6	June 15, 2018	978-4-04-735184-4
7	January 15, 2019	978-4-04-735291-9
8	October 15, 2019	978-4-04-735292-6
9	March 15, 2020	978-4-04-736043-3
10	July 15, 2020	978-4-04-736092-1
11	January 15, 2021	978-4-04-736094-5
12	July 15, 2021	978-4-04-736695-4
13	March 15, 2022	978-4-04-736695-4
14	November 15, 2023	978-4-04-737105-7
15	June 15, 2026	978-4-04-737106-4

==== Akuyaku Reijō wa Oshi ga Tōto Sugite Kyō mo Shiawase ====
No.	Release date	ISBN
1	January 15, 2021	978-4-04-736095-2
2	March 15, 2022	978-4-04-736955-9

=== Manga ===
A manga adaptation illustrated by Hoshina began serialization on Enterbrain's B's Log Comic service on December 5, 2017, and has been compiled into 18 tankōbon volumes as of October 2026.

A manga adaptation of the Akuyaku Reijō wa Oshi ga Tōto Sugite Kyō mo Shiawase spin-off series illustrated by Ino Mamaru was serialized on the same service from January 5, 2021, to May 5, 2023. Its chapters were compiled into three tankōbon volumes released from July 1, 2021, to June 1, 2023.

==== Volumes ====
No.	Release date	ISBN
1	June 15, 2018	978-4-04-735199-8
2	November 1, 2018	978-4-04-735397-8
3	April 30, 2019	978-4-04-735555-2
4	November 1, 2019	978-4-04-735760-0
5	February 29, 2020	978-4-04-736031-0
6	June 30, 2020	978-4-04-736166-9
7	December 28, 2020	978-4-04-736449-3; 978-4-04-736461-5 (SE)
8	July 1, 2021	978-4-04-736680-0
9	December 1, 2021	978-4-04-736851-4
10	June 1, 2022	978-4-04-737073-9
11	December 27, 2022	978-4-04-737326-6
12	June 30, 2023	978-4-04-737539-0
13	February 1, 2024	978-4-04-737807-0
14	August 1, 2024	978-4-04-738062-2
15	January 31, 2025	978-4-04-738286-2
16	September 1, 2025	978-4-04-738600-6
17	February 28, 2026	978-4-04-738830-7
18	October 1, 2026	978-4-04-500290-8

==== Akuyaku Reijō wa Oshi ga Tōto Sugite Kyō mo Shiawase ====
No.	Release date	ISBN
1	July 1, 2021	978-4-04-736682-4
2	April 1, 2022	978-4-04-736971-9
3	June 1, 2023	978-4-04-737252-8

=== Visual novel ===
A visual novel adaptation developed by Operahouse was released for Nintendo Switch and Steam on March 21, 2024.

=== Anime ===
An anime adaptation was announced on July 4, 2025. It was produced by Studio Deen and directed by Takayuki Hamana, with series composition by Yoshimi Narita, characters designed by Majiro, while music was composed by Satoshi Hono and Karin Nakano. It aired from January 11 to March 29, 2026, on Tokyo MX and other networks. The opening theme song is "Ai no Fanfare" (愛のファンファーレ; 'Love's Fanfare'), while the ending theme song is "Mahō no Oto" (魔法の音; lit. 'The Magical Sound'), both performed by Ayahi Takagaki and Yu Shirota. Crunchyroll is streaming the series.

==== Episodes ====
No.	Title	Directed by	Written by	Storyboarded by	Original release date
1	"A Love That Begins with the Ending"; Transliteration: "Endingu Kara Hajimaru Koi wa" (Japanese: エンディングから始まる恋は)	Mitsuki Kobayashi	Yoshimi Narita	Takayuki Hamana	January 11, 2026
Tiararose prepares to marry Prince Hartknights of Lapis-Lazuli Kingdom, but Hartknights is having an affair with their classmate. The shock causes Tiararose to regain memories of her previous life as a game-loving teenager. Tiararose realises she is in the game Lapis-Lazuli Ring, her classmate is heroine Akari while she is Tiararose, the villainess. She remembers Tiararose bullied Akari, causing Hartknights to end their engagement at their school graduation party while Akari marries Hartknights. She returns home to her maid Philine and proud parents Prime Minister Schnauss and mother Iltiana before attending the party. Hartknights publicly cancels their engagement and accuses her of bullying. However, Tiararose defends herself against every accusation; exposing Hartknights ignorance of the law, Akari's ignorance of royal etiquette and seducing another woman's fiancé. Hartknights petulantly banishes Tiararose from the kingdom but she is suddenly defended by Aquasteed, Prince of Marinforest, a character from Lapis-Lazuli Ring 2, which hadn't been released before she died. Aquasteed criticises Hartknights behaviour as disgraceful, then admits he has loved Tiararose for years and asks her to marry him. Despite being newly engaged to Hartknights, Akari grabs Aquasteed's arm, insisting Tiararose is unfit for him and asking he stay with her instead. As a major breach of royal etiquette Aquasteed has Akari arrested, humiliating Hartknights. Tiararose has no idea how the new game's plot will unfold.
2	"Prince Aqua, Do You Like Sugar?"; Transliteration: "Akua-sama wa Shugā ga o Suki?" (Japanese: アクア様はシュガーがお好き？)	Fumio Maezono	Yoshimi Narita	Hiroyuki Fukushima	January 18, 2026
Aquasteed explains to Tiararose how he fell in love with her, watching her from afar at the academy, but never approached due to her engagement to Hartknights, but in light of Hartknights actions, he seized his chance to be with the girl he loves and impulsively proposed. Aquasteed invites her on their first date and though Tiararose accepts, she is uncertain and conflicted, believing there cannot be an ending to Lapis-Lazuli 2 in which the villainess is happily married to a prince. Meanwhile, Hartknights visits Akari to truly question and verify that Tiara bullied her, but Akari feigns ignorance and is upset Aquasteed proposed to Tiararose. Hartknights realizes Akari lied to him and confesses to his father, the King, who makes him realize Tiararose was only tough on him because she cared and only ever wanted what was best for him. Hartknights is left guilt ridden, but there is no fixing a broken engagement. Tiararose frets over her date with Aquasteed, which is her first since Hartknights never took her on a date. They enjoy their picnic so much Tiararose feels closer to Aquasteed than she ever did to Hartknights. The next day she decides to marry Aquasteed, but on her way to tell him she encounters Hartknights, who apologises for everything he did. Tiararose accepts his apology, relieved that Hartknights is now on the right path again, but when he attempts to touch Tiara without her consent, Aquasteed appears and embraces her in his arms.
3	"A Proposal Sweeter Than Honey"; Transliteration: "Puropōzu wa Mitsu Yori Amaku" (Japanese: プロポーズは蜜より甘く)	Shigeru Yamazaki	Yoshimi Narita	Akiko Sano	January 25, 2026
A flashback shows how Aquasteed met and fell in love with Tiararose at the academy, culminating in his proposal to her after Hartknights ended their engagement. Now in the present, he sees Hartknights with Tiararose and pulls her away. He confirms their engagement has been recognised by Tiararose' parents, his father the King of Marinforest and Hartknight's father King Alexander, so he no longer has the right to touch her. Having been unaware of this, Hartknights is upset but apologises and leaves. Tiararose is momentarily afraid of Aquasteed but soon forgets about it. Over tea they introduce their servants Philine and Elliot. Meanwhile, Akari has been confined to her room since the party, with even Hartknights no longer visiting her. Deciding it is unfair to treat the heroine of the story this way she formulates a plan. Tiararose and Aquasteed share their first kiss in the gardens, just as a bright light covers the whole area. Tiararose recognises it as the Heroine's Holy Prayer, which only Akari can use, to repel all evil within the borders of the kingdom. As every kingdom will now want Akari for themselves, Tiararose worries Aquasteed might end their engagement and try to marry Akari instead.
4	"The Sweetest Kiss in the World"; Transliteration: "Sekai de Ichiban Amai Kisu o" (Japanese: 世界で一番甘いキスを)	Takashi Andō	Sayaka Abe	Hiroyuki Fukushima	February 1, 2026
The palace claims the light was broken magical equipment and sends Tiararose home. Aquasteed is naturally told the truth and makes preparations to see if Akari can be claimed for Marinforest. Ten days later Akari sulks Aquasteed has not visited to declare his love yet. Aquasteed finally visits Tiararose with news Akari's engagement has been settled after much negotiating. Tiararose panics at losing Aquasteed, until he reveals Akari will marry Hartknights. That night Akari manifests in Tiararose's bedroom for a frank discussion about both being players of the game. When she realises Tiararose never played the sequel she warns her there is another heroine in Marinforest, Icilla, whom Aquasteed falls in love with after growing bored of his first fiancée. Regardless, she demands Tiararose dump Aquasteed, then threatens to disfigure her face with magic when she refuses. Aquasteed appears and saves her, leaving Akari in shock that he does not care about acquiring Holy Prayer and is marrying Tiararose for love. Akari is arrested and sent to the White Tower which reduces her magic, but still convinces Hartknights she loves him. Tiararose and Aquasteed depart for Marinforest but Akari still can manifest a letter to them claiming she will try to be happy with Hartknights. Akari also includes a note in Japanese reminding Tiararose not to lose against Icilla.
5	"The Mermaid Knows Not of Love"; Transliteration: "Māmeido wa Koi o Shirazu" (Japanese: マーメイドは恋を知らず)	Sumito Sasaki	Misaki Morie	Takashi Iida	February 8, 2026
Aquasteed shows Tiararose the ocean where Tiararose learns ocean fairies dislike her. A young woman appears and is revealed to be Icilla, whom Aquasteed already knows. While preparing for her welcoming party Tiararose regrets there are no blue flowers to match Aquasteed's hair, but the forest fairies turn roses blue for her. The servants are amazed as Tiararose is the only person in Marinforest the forest fairies like. Tiararose meets Aquasteed's parents King Sotiris and Queen Lavina. Tiararose is unable to avoid an invitation to Icilla's mansion. Icilla is delighted Tiararose and Aquasteed are marrying for love, whereas she is happy to accept an arranged marriage as long as she has access to the ocean. Tiararose later witnesses Icilla and Aquasteed looking like they are about to kiss. Afraid the game is forcing them together, a jealous Tiararose hugs Aquasteed, reclaiming his attention. Her knight Torma assures her Aquasteed and Icilla are only close for work reasons, but Tiararose remains uncertain. The forest fairies suddenly abduct Tiararose to meet Fairy King of the Forest.
6	"Tiara in the Sleeping Forest"; Transliteration: "Nemure Mori no Tiara" (Japanese: 眠れる森のティアラ)	Yoshihide Ibata	Misaki Morie	Takayuki Hamana	February 15, 2026
Forest King Keith can tell Tiararose has an unusual soul. Tiararose notes fairies do as they please, making her wish she was free too. Keith returns Tiararose to her bedroom, causing a misunderstanding with Aquasteed. Aquasteed invites her to observe him working so she can learn how he runs the kingdom. Tiararose is uncomfortable with how often Aquasteed has meetings with Icilla. Aquasteed regrets he must spend so long keeping Icilla happy – her ties with the ocean fairies mean if she becomes upset the fairies will cause storms and ruin the fishing. Tiararose remembers seeing a poster advertising Lapis Lazuli 2 where Aquasteed falls in the ocean during a date event. The next morning Aquasteed announces he will be inspecting the coral reefs, worrying Tiararose. Aquasteed decides not to go when he sees it upsets her. Later, Aquasteed saves Icilla from tripping and ends up falling into a fountain, perfectly copying the poster and making Tiararose fear it is impossible to change the story. Sensing she is upset Keith kidnaps her and puts her to sleep to recover as her heart is full of emotional pain. He guesses there will soon be trouble with the ocean fairies. Aquasteed is furious when Keith visits him and declares he will be keeping Tiararose for himself.
7	"Hold Me... Tighter"; Transliteration: "Motto... Tsuyoku Dakishimete" (Japanese: もっと。。。強く抱きしめて)	Shigeru Yamazaki	Yoshimi Narita	Hitoyuki Matsui	February 22, 2026
Aquasteed reaches Keith's castle with his servant Elliot. Tiararose awakens but with Keith absent the forest fairies agree to show her the way home if she bakes sweets first. Despite doing so, Keith appears and reveals Aquasteed has already arrived. Aquasteed challenges Keith to duel. Keith reveals Aquasteed must not value Tiararose as she has much pain in her heart caused by Aquasteed. Keith accepts the duel and destroys a wall, revealing his castle is actually on the tallest mountain in Marinforest. Tiararose tries to intervene but is knocked through the hole in the wall. Aquasteed jumps after her and while falling he apologises for causing her pain and Tiararose confesses to being jealous over Icilla. Forced by necessity, Sky Fairy King stops them falling to their deaths. They reconcile and kiss, with Tiararose determined to do even more to support Aquasteed. Tiararose then scolds Aquasteed and Keith for over an hour for acting foolishly but realises she needs to help them get along for Marinforest's future. After convincing them to share the sweets she realises Aquasteed and Keith are very similar people. The fairies find it funny Tiararose can boss around a prince and a Fairy King.
8	"Blessings on the Teary Bride"; Transliteration: "Namida no Hanayome ni Shukufuku o" (Japanese: 涙の花嫁に祝福を)	Takashi Andō	Sayaka Abe	Takashi Iida	March 1, 2026
Tiararose visits her parents. Akari gives Tiararose earrings blessed with Holy Prayer. Tiararose and Aquasteed return to Marinforest for their wedding. Icilla visits Tiararose, as does Akari who teleports there to warn Icilla to stop being so familiar with Aquasteed once he is Tiararose's husband. Icilla is confused as she has never had romantic feelings for Aquasteed or thought she did not. Tiararose worries Akari is only there because she knows something happens during the wedding. At the wedding Icilla realises she loves Aquasteed and almost interrupts the ceremony, but is stopped by Akari, who knew if Icilla was allowed to interrupt the game would ensure she married Aquasteed and Tiararose left heartbroken. Aquasteed sees Icila crying, and the game almost sends him to comfort her, but Tiararose hugs him to regain his attention and they are married without incident. Icilla wishes them a happy married life and decides to somehow forget her love for Aquasteed. Keith reveals himself and publicly blesses their marriage. Tiararose is grateful the game has ended and now she can live a normal life, but Fairy King of the Ocean is unhappy.
9	"A Love Like Ripples On The Water"; Transliteration: "Koi wa Sazanami no Yō ni" (Japanese: 恋はさざ波のように)	Mitsuki Kobayashi	Misaki Morie	Mitsuki Kobayashi	March 8, 2026
After the wedding, a sinister black miasma appears on the ocean. Tiararose spends time baking, but notices cookies disappearing without explanation. Tiararose decides not to trouble Aquasteed with something so trivial, but the servants report it to him anyway, as unexplained magic close to the future queen is worrisome. A short time later, Tiararose witnesses an ocean fairy steal a cookie. The fairies, who are worried that Icilla is still upset, try to give the cookie to the Ocean King, but he rejects it because it was made by an untrustworthy human. Tiararose and Aquasteed visit Icilla to ask about the fairies. Icilla is aware that the fairies are bullying Tiararose for stealing Aquasteed from her and promises to visit the Ocean King so he can intervene. Tiararose is visited out of nowhere by Sky King Claire, who explains that Tiararose puts tiny bits of magic into everything she bakes, and the fairies, who don't actually need to eat to survive, find her magic comforting. Claire starts attending Tiararose' tea parties regularly. Icilla visits Ocean King and is shocked when Ocean King admits she hates Tiararose.
10	"Whisper That You Love Me"; Transliteration: "Ai Shite Iru to Sasayaite..." (Japanese: 愛していると囁いて...)	Shunji Yoshida	Sayaka Abe	Hiroyuki Fukushima	March 15, 2026
Ocean King angrily demands to know what Claire is doing around Tiararose, then banishes Icilla when Icilla doesn't know. Icilla visits Tiararose just as Claire visits with Keith for tea, only for Ocean King to angrily emerge from the cup. Claire reveals that Ocean King is named Pearl, who disappears after seeing Claire with Tiararose. Claire is uncertain why Pearl is angry, yet Tiararose can tell that Pearl likes Crail. Claire asks Tiararose for help selecting a gift for Pearl. Later, Pearl ambushes Tairarose and accuses her of manipulating Crail. Tiararose invites Pearl to her next tea party, promising Claire will attend, but Pearl vanishes. Tiararose advises Claire to choose a gift himself, as Pearl will prefer it that way. Pearl spies on Claire as he chooses a gift for her, but grows furious when he also buys one for Tiararose. Pearl visits Icilla and demands she steal Aquasteed from Tiararose with a love potion. Aquasteed decides to ask Claire for a meeting with Pearl to explain everything. Icilla puts the potion in Aquasteed's tea, and though she changes her mind at the last second, she is too late, and Aquasteed falls in love with her. He dismisses the broken-hearted Tiararose and decides to take Icilla to the meeting with Pearl instead.
11	"My Beautiful Lady"; Transliteration: "Uruwashi no Mairedi" (Japanese: 麗しのマイレディ)	Takayuki Hamana & Matsuo Asami	Misaki Morie	Takashi Iida	March 22, 2026
Aquasteed runs as the elixir temporarily stops working once he is away from Icilla. Flashbacks show Pearl was once engaged to a human who then left her for a human woman, causing her to distrust love. Then when she fell in love with Claire and saw him interact with Tiararose it caused a rage she couldn't control. Tiararose and Icilla follow after Aquasteed, who falls in love with Icilla again. When Tiararose cries Aquasteed stabs himself to break the elixer's effect. Everyone meets at the ocean with Icill admitting what she did and Tiararose insisting they must clear things up with Pearl. As the problem revolves around the ocean, Claire and Keith reveal it can only be solved by humans blessed by the sky and forest Kings, Aquasteed and Tiararose. The spell fails as Tiararose is not the heroine so she does not have enough magic. Wanting to compesate, she uses the cookies which contain some of her magic. The ocean is restored and the cookies even cure Aquasteed of the elixir. A new flower species blooms nearby from Tiararose' magic that produce sugar. Claire goes to confront Pearl. Tiararose decides to follow to help however she can, with Icilla volunteering to take her safely underwater.
12	"Love Is Always And Forever"; Transliteration: "Ai wa Itsumo, Itsu Made mo" (Japanese: 愛はいつも、いつまでも)	Shigeru Yamazaki	Yoshimi Narita	Takayuki Hamana	March 29, 2026
Claire scolds Pearl for involving humans in their personal business. Tiararose insists she loves only Aquasteed. Pearl reveals her human love refused to marry a fairy king but adopted her name as his own so he would not forget her. Icilla realizes it must have been one of her Pearllant family ancestors who rejected Pearl. Claire gives Pearl the gift and explains about having chosen it himself. Pearl is relieved, but Claire insists she needs to atone. Pearl is made to surrender most of her power by blessing both Aquasteed and Tiararose for the prosperity of Marinforest, granting Aquasteed a water blade and Tiararose a water barrier. Icilla is surprised Aquasteed lets her keep her role as ocean overseer. Keith visits with sugar gathered from Tiararose's new flower species, which she uses to make candy. Pearl uses the last of her power to restore the ocean, putting herself into deep hibernation. Claire throws one of the sweets into the ocean, hoping it reaches Pearl somehow. Akari later sends Tiararose a letter warning her about a secret bonus level only available if she receives Pearl's blessing. Tiararose decides not to read it, content to let the future happen without knowing what it is, confident she and Aquasteed can survive together.

== Reception ==
The series ranked seventh in the shōjo/josei category in BookLive's Digital Manga Annual Ranking for 2019. In 2024, it was reported that the series had sold over 5 million copies.
