= List of Dr. Slump episodes =

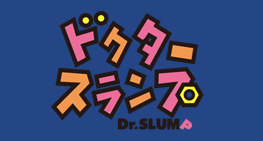
Series logo

The second anime adaptation of the Dr. Slump manga series created by Akira Toriyama aired on Fuji TV from November 26, 1997, to September 22, 1999. Produced by Toei Animation and directed by Shigeyasu Yamauchi, it lasted 74 episodes. In February 2021, American streaming service Tubi announced their acquisition of the Dr. Slump TV anime for release with English subtitles.

== Episodes ==
No.	Title	Directed by	Written by	Animation directed by	Art directed by	Original release date
1	"Arale is Born!!"; Transliteration: "Arare Tanjou!!" (Japanese: アラレ誕生!!)	Shigeyasu Yamauchi	Satoru Nishizono	Tadayoshi Yamamuro	Ryūji Yoshi'ike	November 26, 1997
1	"Let's Go to School"; Transliteration: "Gakkou e Ikou" (Japanese: 学校へ行こう)	Shigeyasu Yamauchi	Satoru Nishizono	Tadayoshi Yamamuro	Tsutomu Fujita	November 26, 1997
On a stormy night Senbei Norimaki is in the middle of creating an attractive teenage maid android to serve him but lightning hits his house causing his machines to malfunction and instead creates a strange nearsighted little girl with Super Powers which he names Arale. While Senbei went into town to get clothes, Arale runs loose in Penguin Village causing havoc and destroying buildings until Senbei gets back. Arale starts her first day of school while Senbei meets her teacher Miss Yamabuki whom he falls in love with. At school the kids find out about Arale's strength and everybody wants her to join their clubs.
2	"Time Slipper!" (Japanese: タイムスリッパー!)	Yoshihiro Ueda	Satoru Nishizono	Takeo Ide	Ryūji Yoshi'ike	December 3, 1997
2	"The Mysterious Baby"; Transliteration: "Fushigi na Aka-chan" (Japanese: ふしぎな赤ちゃん)	Yoshihiro Ueda	Satoru Nishizono	Yoichi Onishi	Tomoko Yoshida	December 3, 1997
3	"Arale's Missing Thing..."; Transliteration: "Arale ni Nai Mono..." (Japanese: アラレにないもの…)	Junji Shimizu	Atsushi Maekawa	Kenji Yokoyama	Ryūji Yoshi'ike	December 10, 1997
3	"Dekachibi Ray Gun!"; Transliteration: "Dekachibi Kousenjuu!" (Japanese: デカチビ光線銃!)	Junji Shimizu	Atsushi Maekawa	Kenji Yokoyama	Tsutomu Fujita	December 10, 1997
4	"The Real Machine"; Transliteration: "Honmono Machine" (Japanese: 本物マシーン)	Hidehiko Kadota	Yoshimi Narita	Yūji Hakamada	Ryūji Yoshi'ike	December 17, 1997
4	"Ori's Bear"; Transliteration: "Ori no Kuma-san" (Japanese: オリのクマさん)	Hidehiko Kadota	Yoshimi Narita	Yūji Hakamada	Tomoko Yoshida	December 17, 1997
5	"School Lunch Banzai!"; Transliteration: "Kyuushoku Banzai!" (Japanese: 給食バンザイ!)	Jun'ichi Fujise	Atsushi Maekawa	Masayuki Uchiyama	Ryūji Yoshi'ike	January 14, 1998
5	"Arale Flies in the Sky"; Transliteration: "Arale Sora o Tobu!!" (Japanese: アラレ空を飛ぶ!!)	Shigeyasu Yamauchi	Atsushi Maekawa	Masayuki Uchiyama	Tsutomu Fujita	January 14, 1998
6	"Great King of Fear Niko-chan"; Transliteration: "Kyoufu no Niko-chan Daiou" (Japanese: 恐怖のニコちゃん大王)	Naoyuki Itō	Satoru Nishizono	Kazuya Hisada	Ryūji Yoshi'ike	January 21, 1998
6	"Earth SOS!"; Transliteration: "Chikyuu SOS!" (Japanese: 地球SOS!)	Naoyuki Itō	Satoru Nishizono	Kazuya Hisada	Tomoko Yoshida	January 21, 1998
7	"Returning the Lost Items"; Transliteration: "Otoshimono o Todokeyou" (Japanese: 落とし物を届けよう)	Jun'ichi Fujise	Yoshimi Narita	Yoichi Onishi	Ryūji Yoshi'ike	January 28, 1998
7	"Invisible Professor"; Transliteration: "Toumei Hakase" (Japanese: 透明博士)	Shigeyasu Yamauchi	Yoshimi Narita	Yoichi Onishi	Ryūji Yoshi'ike	January 28, 1998
8	"Akane's Trick"; Transliteration: "Akane no Itazura" (Japanese: あかねのイタズラ)	Junji Shimizu	Atsushi Maekawa	Noboru Koizumi	Ryūji Yoshi'ike	February 4, 1998
8	"Arale's Mission"; Transliteration: "Otsukai Arale-chan" (Japanese: お使いアラレちゃん)	Junji Shimizu	Atsushi Maekawa	Tomohiro Takayama	Taizaburo Abe	February 4, 1998
9	"Our Hero Suppaman"; Transliteration: "Eiyuu Suppaman" (Japanese: 英雄スッパマン)	Yoshihiro Ueda	Satoru Nishizono	Takeo Ide	Tomoko Yoshida	February 11, 1998
9	"Fairy Tale Machine"; Transliteration: "Otogi Machine" (Japanese: おとぎマシーン)	Yoshihiro Ueda	Satoru Nishizono	Yoichi Onishi	Tomoko Yoshida	February 11, 1998
10	"Hip Hip Children"; Transliteration: "Teketeke Chiruldon" (Japanese: てけてけチルドレン)	Hidehiko Kadota	Yoshimi Narita	Kenji Yokoyama	Ryūji Yoshi'ike	February 18, 1998
10	"Bye-Bye Mechanko Power!!"; Transliteration: "Byebye Mechanko Power!!" (Japanese: バイバイめちゃんこパワー!!)	Hidehiko Kadota	Yoshimi Narita	Kenji Yokoyama	Ryūji Yoshi'ike	February 18, 1998
11	"Hello! Wonder Island"; Transliteration: "Harou! Wonder Island" (Japanese: ハロー! 不思議島[ワンダーアイランド])	Naoyuki Itō	Atsushi Maekawa	Yūji Hakamada	Ryūji Yoshi'ike	February 25, 1998
11	"Big King Unmo"; Transliteration: "Daimaou Unmou" (Japanese: 大魔王ウンモー)	Naoyuki Itō	Atsushi Maekawa	Yūji Hakamada	Tomoko Yoshida	February 25, 1998
12	"When Arale Got Serious"; Transliteration: "Majime ni Natta Arale" (Japanese: マジメになったアラレ)	Shigeyasu Yamauchi	Atsushi Maekawa	Kazuya Hisada	Taizaburo Abe	March 4, 1998
12	"Transform! Ponpoko Gun"; Transliteration: "Henshin! Ponpokogan" (Japanese: 変身!ポンポコガン)	Shigeyasu Yamauchi	Atsushi Maekawa	Kazuya Hisada	Ryūji Yoshi'ike	March 4, 1998
13	"The Dreadful Hoyoyo Date"; Transliteration: "Aishuu no Hoyoyo Date" (Japanese: 哀愁のほよよデート)	Yoshihiro Ueda	Yoshimi Narita	Noboru Koizumi	Tomoko Yoshida	March 11, 1998
13	"Yay Yay Wildland"; Transliteration: "Waiwai Wildland" (Japanese: わいわいワイルドランド)	Yoshihiro Ueda	Yoshimi Narita	Noboru Koizumi	Tomoko Yoshida	March 11, 1998
14	"Penguin Village SOS"; Transliteration: "Pengin-mura SOS" (Japanese: ペンギン村SOS)	Junji Shimizu	Yoshimi Narita	Masayuki Uchiyama	Taizaburo Abe	March 18, 1998
14	"Wonder Kintaman"; Transliteration: "Kaiketsu Kintaman" (Japanese: 怪傑キンタマン)	Junji Shimizu	Yoshimi Narita	Masayuki Uchiyama	Taizaburo Abe	March 18, 1998
SP1	"Robot Showdown! Emergency Dr. Mashirito Appears"; Transliteration: "Robot Taiketsu! Shukuteki Dr. Mashirito Toujou" (Japanese: ロボット対決！宿敵ドクターマシリト登場)	Shigeyasu Yamauchi	Yoshimi Narita	Tadayoshi Yamamuro	Tadanao Tsuji & Ryūji Yoshi'ike	April 1, 1998
SP1	"A Kiin Win!? Penguin Grand Prix"; Transliteration: "Keen de Yuushou!? Penguin Grand Prix" (Japanese: キーンで優勝!? ペンギン・グランプリ)	Hidehiko Kadota	Atsushi Maekawa	Yoichi Onishi	Tadanao Tsuji & Ryūji Yoshi'ike	April 1, 1998
15	"Arale and Donbe"; Transliteration: "Arale to Donbe" (Japanese: アラレとドンベ)	Hidehiko Kadota	Atsushi Maekawa	Yoichi Onishi	Tomoko Yoshida	April 15, 1998
15	"The Great Arale's Eyes Strategy"; Transliteration: "Arale Me Taisaku Ikusa" (Japanese: アラレ目大作戦)	Hidehiko Kadota	Atsushi Maekawa	Yoichi Onishi	Tomoko Yoshida	April 15, 1998
16	"A Nerve-Wracking Health Examination"; Transliteration: "Dokidoki Kenkoushindan" (Japanese: ドキドキ健康診断)	Naoyuki Itō	Tsuyoshi Tamai	Yukimaro Ohtsubo	Taizaburo Abe	April 22, 1998
16	"The Convenient Machine Ohcha-Boy"; Transliteration: "Benri Machine! Oocha-kun" (Japanese: 便利マシーン!オーチャ君)	Naoyuki Itō	Tsuyoshi Tamai	Yukimaro Ohtsubo	Taizaburo Abe	April 22, 1998
17	"A Visit to Arale's Classroom"; Transliteration: "Arale no Jugyou Sankan" (Japanese: アラレの授業参観)	Jun'ichi Fujise	Yoshimi Narita	Kenji Yokoyama	Tomoko Yoshida	April 29, 1998
17	"Pisuke's First Love"; Transliteration: "Hatsukoi Piisuke" (Japanese: はつこいピースケ)	Jun'ichi Fujise	Yoshimi Narita	Kenji Yokoyama	Tomoko Yoshida	April 29, 1998
18	"Let’s Go to Outer Space"; Transliteration: "Uchuu he Ikou" (Japanese: 宇宙へ行こう)	Yoshihiro Ueda	Atsushi Maekawa	Kazuya Hisada	Taizaburo Abe	May 6, 1998
18	"Let’s Attack an Outer Space Monster!!"; Transliteration: "Uchuu Kaijuu wo Yattsukero!!" (Japanese: 宇宙怪獣をやっつけろ!!)	Yoshihiro Ueda	Atsushi Maekawa	Kazuya Hisada	Taizaburo Abe	May 6, 1998
19	"Goodbye Gatchan! From People of Japan"; Transliteration: "Sayonara Gacchan! Uchuu kara no Tazune Hito" (Japanese: さよならガッちゃん! 宇宙からのたずね人)	Junji Shimizu	Tsuyoshi Tamai	Noboru Koizumi	Tomoko Yoshida	May 13, 1998
20	"The Tiny Devil From Hell! Chivil"; Transliteration: "Jikou no Chibikko Akuma! Chibiru-kun" (Japanese: 地獄のチビッコ悪魔！チビルくん)	Shigeyasu Yamauchi	Yoshimi Narita	Yūji Hakamada	Taizaburo Abe	May 20, 1998
21	"An Exchange Student Has Arrived"; Transliteration: "Tenkousei ga Kita!!" (Japanese: 転校生が来たッ!!)	Naoyuki Itō	Atsushi Maekawa	Yoichi Onishi	Tomoko Yoshida	May 27, 1998
21	"Two Arales!? Copy-kun"; Transliteration: "Arale ga Futari!? Copy-kun" (Japanese: アラレがふたり!?コピーくん)	Naoyuki Itō	Atsushi Maekawa	Yoichi Onishi	Tomoko Yoshida	May 27, 1998
22	"Teacher Defeated!! Arale's Exploration Party"; Transliteration: "Sensei Taoreru!! Arale no Micro Tankentai" (Japanese: 先生倒れる!! アラレのミクロ探検隊)	Hidehiko Kadota	Yoshimi Narita	Kenji Yokoyama	Taizaburo Abe	June 10, 1998
23	"I'll Show You How Bad I Can Be! Arale Joins a Biker Gang"; Transliteration: "Watashi Gure te Yaru! Arale Bousouzoku ni Naru" (Japanese: わたしグレてやる! アラレ暴走族になる)	Directed by : Jun'ichi Fujise; Storyboarded by : Kenji Yokoyama	Tsuyoshi Tamai	Tadayoshi Yamamuro	Tomoko Yoshida	June 17, 1998
24	"The Vampire Dranpire! The Great Uproar Over Love Blood Donations"; Transliteration: "Kyuuketsuki Dranpire! Ai no Kenketsu Daisoudou" (Japanese: 吸血鬼ドランパイア！愛の献血大騒動)	Yoshihiro Ueda	Yoshimi Narita	Kazuya Hisada	Kunihiro Chida	June 24, 1998
25	"The Idiot Who Kidnapped Arale!"; Transliteration: "Deta! Arale wo Yuukaishita Aho na Yatsu" (Japanese: 出た！アラレを誘かいしたアホなヤツ)	Shigeyasu Yamauchi	Atsushi Maekawa	Noboru Koizumi	Taizaburo Abe & Shouko Tsukada	July 8, 1998
26	"Is it Really True!? Senbee Gets Married"; Transliteration: "Honto ni Hontou!? Senbee-san Kekkon Suru" (Japanese: ホントに本当!? 千兵衛さん結婚する)	Junji Shimizu	Yoshimi Narita	Yoichi Onishi	Tomoko Yoshida & Shouko Tsukada	July 22, 1998
27	"Marriage! Going on a Strange Honeymoon?!"; Transliteration: "Kekkon da! Chinkon Ryokou tte Tsuoi!?" (Japanese: 結婚だ！チンコン旅行ってつおい!?)	Naoyuki Itō	Tsuyoshi Tamai	Yūji Hakamada	Taizaburo Abe & Miyuki Satō	July 29, 1998
28	"More Powerful Than Arale! Jungle Boy's Power"; Transliteration: "Arale yori Tsuoizo! Jungle Shounen no Power" (Japanese: アラレよりつおいぞ！ジャングル少年のパワー)	Hidehiko Kadota	Atsushi Maekawa	Kenji Yokoyama	Tomoko Yoshida	August 5, 1998
29	"Has Gatchan Undergone a Great Transformation, Too?! The Stealthy Helmet"; Transliteration: "Gucchan mo Taihen!? Konkon Helmet" (Japanese: ガッちゃんも大変身!? コンコンヘルメット)	Shigeyasu Yamauchi	Yoshimi Narita	Tadayoshi Yamamuro & Takeo Ide	Tomoko Yoshida & Taizaburo Abe	August 12, 1998
30	"Arale in the Nick of the Time! Doctor Mashirito’s Counterattack!!"; Transliteration: "Arale Kikiippatsu! Doctor Mashirito no Kyakushou!!" (Japanese: アラレ危機一髪！ドクターマシリトの逆襲!!)	Yoshihiro Ueda	Atsushi Maekawa	Kazuya Hisada	Tadanao Tsuji & Ryūji Yoshi'ike	August 19, 1998
31	"Ni Hao! The Tun Family Has Come"; Transliteration: "Nīhao! Zhāi San Ikka Ga Yatteki Ta" (Japanese: ニイハオ！摘さん一家がやって来た)	Junji Shimizu	Tsuyoshi Tamai	Yoichi Onishi	Tomoko Yoshida	August 26, 1998
32	"What a Surprise! Super-Senchan in Urban Island"; Transliteration: "Odoroki! Supersen-chan in Tokai Shima" (Japanese: 驚き！スーパーセンちゃんin都会島)	Naoyuki Itō	Atsushi Maekawa	Kenji Yokoyama	Taizaburo Abe & Kunihiro Chida	September 2, 1998
33	"Please God!! Don't Stop, Ms. Midori"; Transliteration: "Kamisama Onegai!! Midori-sensei Yamenaide" (Japanese: 神様お願い!! みどり先生やめないで)	Hidehiko Kadota	Atsushi Maekawa	Eisaku Inoue	Tomoko Yoshida	September 9, 1998
34	"The Strongest Rival Appears!"; Transliteration: "Saikyou Rival Toujou de gozaimaasu!" (Japanese: 最強ライバル登場でございまーす！)	Shigeyasu Yamauchi	Tsuyoshi Tamai	Noboru Koizumi	Taizaburo Abe & Miyuki Satō	October 14, 1998
35	"Ultimate Love and Justice... Arale's Big Pinch!"; Transliteration: "Kyuukyoku no Ai to Seigi... Arale Dai Pinch!" (Japanese: 究極の愛と正義…アラレ大ピンチ！)	Yoshihiro Ueda	Tsuyoshi Tamai	Yūji Hakamada	Tomoko Yoshida	October 21, 1998
36	"Starting Today I am the Soldier of Love Obocchaman!"; Transliteration: "Kyou kara Boku wa Ai no Senshi Obocchaman!" (Japanese: 今日からボクは愛の戦士オボッチャマン！)	Junji Shimizu	Atsushi Maekawa	Yoichi Onishi	Taizaburo Abe & Kunihiro Chida	October 28, 1998
37	"Arale and the New Teacher"; Transliteration: "Arale to Shinnin Kyoushi Ai no Atama Tsuki Kassen" (Japanese: アラレと新任教師・愛の頭つき合戦)	Hidehiko Kadota	Yoshimi Narita	Kazuya Hisada	Tomoko Yoshida	November 4, 1998
38	"Obochaman Gets Dumped by Arale!!"; Transliteration: "Arale to Furareta Obocchaman!!" (Japanese: アラレにフラれたオボッチャマン!!)	Naoyuki Itō	Tsuyoshi Tamai	Kenji Yokoyama	Taizaburo Abe & Shouko Tsukada	November 11, 1998
39	"Hoyoyo! I Took a Licking From Dr. Mashrito"; Transliteration: "Hoyoyo! Mashirito ni Yararechitta" (Japanese: ホヨヨ！マシリトにやられちった)	Shigeyasu Yamauchi	Atsushi Maekawa	Takeo Ide	Tomoko Yoshida	November 18, 1998
40	"Handle With Care?! an Expensive Melon Explodes Wildly"; Transliteration: "Toriatsukaichuui!? Koukyuu Melon Daibakuhatsu" (Japanese: 取り扱い注意!? 高級メロン大爆発!!)	Yoshihiro Ueda	Yoshimi Narita	Noboru Koizumi	Taizaburo Abe & Kunihiro Chida	November 25, 1998
41	"Flying Through the Sky to Search for Obochaman!"; Transliteration: "Sora wo Tonde Obocchaman wo Sagase!" (Japanese: 空を飛んでオボッチャマンを探せ！)	Junji Shimizu	Tsuyoshi Tamai	Inoue Eisaku	Tomoko Yoshida	December 2, 1998
42	"Hoyo!? Arale Meets a New Friend"; Transliteration: "Hoyo!? Arale ni Atarashii Otomodachi" (Japanese: ほよ!? アラレに新しいおともだち)	Shigeyasu Yamauchi	Atsushi Maekawa	Kazuya Hisada	Taizaburo Abe & Shouko Tsukada	December 9, 1998
43	"Arale Goes to Planet Nikochan!!"; Transliteration: "Arale-chan Niko-chan Hoshi ni Iku!!" (Japanese: アラレちゃんニコチャン星に行く!!)	Hidehiko Kadota	Tsuyoshi Tamai	Yoichi Onishi	Tomoko Yoshida	December 16, 1998
44	"Saving Planet Nikochan With an N'cha Cannon!!"; Transliteration: "Ncha Hou de Niko-chan Hosh wo Sukue!!" (Japanese: んちゃ砲でニコチャン星を救えっ!!)	Yoshihiro Ueda	Atsushi Maekawa	Yūji Hakamada	Taizaburo Abe & Kunihiro Chida	December 23, 1998
45	"Hoyo!? Arale Becomes a Mama"; Transliteration: "Hoyo!? Mama ni Natta Arale-chan" (Japanese: ほよ!? ママになったアラレちゃん)	Naoyuki Itō	Atsushi Maekawa	Kenji Yokoyama	Tomoko Yoshida	December 23, 1998
46	"Hey... Tell Us Arale's Secret"; Transliteration: "Nee... Arale no Himitsu Oshiechau" (Japanese: ねぇ…アラレの秘密おしえちゃう)	Tetsuji Nakamura	Yoshimi Narita	Tadayoshi Yamamuro	Taizaburo Abe & Miyuki Satō	January 13, 1999
47	"Exciting Arale and Barsan of the Jungle"; Transliteration: "Wakuwaku Arale to Mitsurin no Person" (Japanese: わくわくアラレと密林のバーサン)	Directed by : Jun'ichi Fujise; Storyboarded by : Junji Shimizu	Genki Yoshimura	Maki Shirayuri	Tomoko Yoshida	January 20, 1999
48	"A Warning to Arale! Cars Don’t Stop Suddenly"; Transliteration: "Arale ni Chuui! Kuruma wa Kyuu ni Tomarenai" (Japanese: アラレに注意！車は急にとまれない)	Hidehiko Kadota	Atsushi Maekawa	Kazuya Hisada	Taizaburo Abe & Shouko Tsukada	January 27, 1999
49	"It Will Be Springtime Soon: How About Falling Love… Arale"; Transliteration: "Mou sugu Haru desu ne Koi wo shimasen ka... Arale" (Japanese: もうすぐ春ですね恋をしませんか…アラレ)	Yoshihiro Ueda	Yoshimi Narita	Yoichi Onishi	Tomoko Yoshida	February 3, 1999
50	"Arale-chan Will Definitely Become a Hero!"; Transliteration: "Arale-chan Zettai Hero ni Naru!" (Japanese: アラレちゃん絶対ヒーローになる！)	Naoyuki Itō	Yoshimi Narita	Kenji Yokoyama	Taizaburo Abe & Kunihiro Chida	February 10, 1999
51	"Arale’s Party… Takes a Trip to a Hot Spring"; Transliteration: "Arale-chan Ichigyou... Onsen Ryokou ni Iku" (Japanese: アラレちゃん一行…温泉旅行に行く)	Tetsuji Nakamura	Atsushi Maekawa	Yūji Hakamada	Tomoko Yoshida	February 17, 1999
52	"Starting Today Arale is a Lovely Lady"; Transliteration: "Kyou kara Arale wa Suteki na Lady" (Japanese: 今日からアラレはすてきなレディ)	Hidehiko Kadota	Tsuyoshi Tamai	Maki Shirayuri	Taizaburo Abe & Miyuki Satō	February 24, 1999
53	"Arale-chan and the Cheerful Pirate Home"; Transliteration: "Arale-chan to Yukai na Kaizoku Ikka" (Japanese: アラレちゃんとゆかいな海賊一家)	Yoshihiro Ueda	Genki Yoshimura	Kazuya Hisada	Tomoko Yoshida	March 3, 1999
54	"Going to the Dragon King’s Palace With Arale on My Birthday"; Transliteration: "Otanjoubi wa Arale to Issho ni Ryuuguujou" (Japanese: お誕生日はアラレといっしょに竜宮城)	Yoshihiro Ueda	Atsushi Maekawa	Takeo Ide	Taizaburo Abe & Tadami Shimokawa	March 10, 1999
55	"Ridiculously Wild: Arale as a Nurse"; Transliteration: "Hachamecha Arale no Kangofu-san" (Japanese: ハチャメチャアラレの看護婦さん)	Naoyuki Itō	Atsushi Maekawa	Yoichi Onishi	Tomoko Yoshida	March 17, 1999
56	"The Super Secret: I Saw the True Form of the Great Monkey"; Transliteration: "Chō (Hi) Dai Zaru no Shōtai o Mita" (Japanese: 超（秘）大ザルの正体を見た)	Hidehiko Kadota	Yoshimi Narita	Yūji Hakamada	Tomoko Yoshida	April 14, 1999
57	"Goku and Arale's Great Pinch at School!"; Transliteration: "Gokuu-kun Arale no Gakkou de Dai Pinch!" (Japanese: 悟空君アラレの学校で大ピンチ！)	Yoshihiro Ueda	Atsushi Maekawa	Kazuya Hisada	Taizaburo Abe & Tadami Shimokawa	April 14, 1999
58	"Arale and Goku’s Super-Battle Is Beginning!"; Transliteration: "Hajimaru yo! Arale to Gokuu Super Battle" (Japanese: 始まるヨ！アラレと悟空スーパーバトル)	Tetsuji Nakamura	Tsuyoshi Tamai	Takeo Ide	Tomoko Yoshida	April 21, 1999
59	"Goku Bye-cha! The World's Strongest Guy"; Transliteration: "Gokuu Baicha! Kono Yo de Ichiban Tsuyoi Yatsu" (Japanese: 悟空バイチャ！この世で一番強いヤツ)	Yoshihiro Ueda	Atsushi Maekawa	Tadayoshi Yamamuro	Taizaburo Abe & Tadami Shimokawa	April 28, 1999
60	"Arale Witnesses!! Taro’s Death-Defying Love!?"; Transliteration: "Arale Mokugeki!! Tarou Inochi ga Ke no Koi!?" (Japanese: アラレ目撃!! タロウ命がけの恋!?)	Tetsuji Nakamura	Yoshimi Narita	Kenji Yokoyama	Taizaburo Abe & Miyuki Satō	May 12, 1999
61	"Arale Is Impressed! Penguin Village’s Bomb-Rodders!!"; Transliteration: "Arale Kangeki! Penguin Mura Bakusouzoku!!" (Japanese: アラレ感激！ペンギン村爆走族!!)	Directed by : Jun'ichi Fujise; Storyboarded by : Kenji Yokoyama	Yoshimi Narita	Eisaku Inoue	Tomoko Yoshida	May 26, 1999
62	"To Be Decided Tonight!? The New Mayor of Penguin Village!!"; Transliteration: "Konya Kettei!? Penguin Mura no Niimura Osa!!" (Japanese: 今夜決定!? ペンギン村の新村長!!)	Hidehiko Kadota	Tsuyoshi Tamai	Yūji Hakamada	Taizaburo Abe & Tadami Shimokawa	June 2, 1999
63	"Arale's Hero! Flying in the Sky Suppaman!"; Transliteration: "Arale no Hero! Sora Tobu Suppaman!" (Japanese: アラレのヒーロー！空飛ぶスッパマン)	Yoshihiro Ueda	Atsushi Maekawa	Kazuya Hisada	Tomoko Yoshida	June 9, 1999
64	"Lots of Senbeis Put Arale in a Panic!?"; Transliteration: "Senbee Darake de Arale Panic!?" (Japanese: 千兵衛だらけでアラレパニック!?)	Shigeyasu Yamauchi	Atsushi Maekawa	Yoichi Onishi	Taizaburo Abe & Tadami Shimokawa	June 16, 1999
65	"A Diamond Larger Than a Turd!!"; Transliteration: "Unchi yori de Kai Diamond!!" (Japanese: ウンチよりでかいダイヤモンド!!)	Hidehiko Kadota	Yoshimi Narita	Noboru Koizumi	Tomoko Yoshida	June 23, 1999
66	"Arale the Fugitive! Rescue Gatchan"; Transliteration: "Toubousha Arale! Gacchan wo Sukue" (Japanese: 逃亡者アラレ！ガッちゃんを救え)	Tetsuji Nakamura	Yoshimi Narita	Kenji Yokoyama	Tadami Shimokawa	July 7, 1999
67	"Has a Gorilla Become a Hanger-on at Arale’s House?"; Transliteration: "Arale n Ie ni Gorilla ga Isourou?" (Japanese: アラレん家にゴリラがいそうろう？)	Yoshihiro Ueda	Tsuyoshi Tamai	Kazuya Hisada	Tomoko Yoshida	July 14, 1999
68	"It's Summer! The Beach! It's Arale! What the?" Transliteration: "Natsu da! Umi da! Arale da! Nanda?" (Japanese: 夏だ！海だ！アラレだ！なんだ？)	Munehisa Sakai	Atsushi Maekawa	Eisaku Inoue	Iwamitsu Ito	August 11, 1999
69	"Penguin Village Rescue Squad 24 Hours!!"; Transliteration: "Penguin Mura Rescue Tai 24 Toki!!" (Japanese: ペンギン村レスキュー隊24時!!)	Shigeyasu Yamauchi	Kenichi Yamada	Yūji Hakamada	Tomoko Yoshida	August 18, 1999
70	"Midori Explodes! Senbei's Foolhardiness"; Transliteration: "Midori Bakuhatsu! Senbee no Unko Tare" (Japanese: みどり爆発！千兵衛のウンコたれ)	Jun'ichi Fujise	Atsushi Maekawa	Takeo Ide	Kunihiro Chida	August 25, 1999
71	"Midori Explodes! Senbei's Foolhardiness"; Transliteration: "Midori Bakuhatsu! Senbee no Unko Tare" (Japanese: みどり爆発！千兵衛のウンコたれ)	Hidehiko Kadota	Yoshimi Narita	Yoichi Onishi	Tomoko Yoshida	September 1, 1999
72	"Arale and the Great King of Fear... Karaoke Battle"; Transliteration: "Arale to Kyoufu no Daiou... Karaoke Kessen" (Japanese: アラレと恐怖の大王…カラオケ合戦)	Yoshihiro Ueda	Kenichi Yamada	Kenji Yokoyama	Kunihiro Chida	September 8, 1999
SP2	Transliteration: "Hoyoyo! Arale no Himitsu Dai Koukai da yo!!" (Japanese: ほよよ！アラレの秘密大公開だよ!!)	Tetsuhisa Kamiyamada	-	-	-	September 15, 1999
73	"Autumn of the Appetite! Gatchan Increases"; Transliteration: "Shokuyoku no Aki! Gacchan Fuechatta" (Japanese: 食欲の秋！ガッちゃんふえちった)	Munehisa Sakai	Yoshimi Narita	Kazuya Hisada	Tomoko Yoshida	September 22, 1999
74	"Everyone Assembles! Okay Bye-Cha!!"; Transliteration: "Minna Shuugou! See no de Baicha!!" (Japanese: みんな集合！せーのでバイチャ!!)	Shigeyasu Yamauchi	Atsushi Maekawa	Yūji Hakamada	Kunihiro Chida & Fumihiro Uchikawa	September 22, 1999
