= Pretty Cure All Stars New Stage: Friends of the Future =

2012 film by Junji Shimizu

- Kanji: 映画プリキュアオールスターズ New Stage みらいのともだち
- Revised Hepburn: Eiga PuriKyua Ōru Sutāzu Nyū Sutēji: Mirai no Tomodachi
- Directed by: Junji Shimizu
- Screenplay by: Yoshimi Narita
- Based on: Pretty Cure by Izumi Todo
- Starring: Misato Fukuen; Asami Tano; Hisako Kanemoto; Marina Inoue; Chinami Nishimura; Ikue Ōtani; Sea Kumada; Takehito Koyasu
- Cinematography: Kenji Takahashi
- Edited by: Yoshihiro Aso
- Music by: Yasuharu Takanashi
- Production company: Toei Animation
- Distributed by: Toei Company, Ltd.
- Release date: March 17, 2012
- Running time: 72 minutes
- Country: Japan
- Language: Japanese
- Box office: US$9,232,219

Pretty Cure All Stars New Stage: Friends of the Future (Japanese: 映画プリキュアオールスターズ New Stage みらいのともだち, Hepburn: Eiga PuriKyua Ōru Sutāzu Nyū Sutēji: Mirai no Tomodachi) is a 2012 Japanese animated action fantasy film based on the Pretty Cure franchise created by Izumi Todo. The film is directed by Junji Shimizu, written by Yoshimi Narita, and produced by Toei Animation. The film was released in Japan on March 17, 2012.

Marking the fourth entry to the Pretty Cure All Stars crossover film series, and the first installment to the New Stage trilogy, the Smile PreCure! team joins the previous Pretty Cure teams as they encounter Fusion once again, while befriending a girl named Ayumi.

== Plot ==
In Yokohama, Fusion reappears once again and threatens the city with calamity. Then, the Pretty Cures assemble and defeats Fusion again, scattering its parts around the city. Meanwhile, a girl named Ayumi Sakagami, who admires the Pretty Cures and witnesses the battle against Fusion, is having trouble making friends at her new school. On her way back home, Ayumi meets a small creature, and decides to name it "Fū-chan". Meanwhile, the fairies: Tarte, Chiffon, Chypre, Coffret, Potpourri, Hummy, and Candy gather for a meeting, and notices that Fusion's scattered parts are looking to recombine, so they all go and ask their respective Pretty Cure teams to search for the fragments to prevent its return.

While searching for the fragments, Miyuki encounters the Suite PreCure team: Hibiki, Kanade, Ellen, and Ako, whom all transform and fight the fragments. Meanwhile, Ayumi notices that people around here are disappearing, and Fū-chan admits he did this for Ayumi in case anyone makes Ayumi suffer. Then, the Smile PreCure! teams assemble and fights Fū-chan, but shocked as he's absorbing their attacks. As the Suite team arrives to assist them, Ayumi stops them from hurting him. The Cures reveal to her that Fū-chan is a fragment of Fusion, and Fū-chan runs away as he tries to make Ayumi's wish granted while destroying the city.

While accompanied by Smile and Suite teams, as well as HeartCatch PreCure! and Fresh Pretty Cure! teams, Ayumi is caught by Fusion's familiars, which in her heart's response to Fū-chan, she transforms into Cure Echo. Using the power of the Miracle Lights and aided by latter Pretty Cure teams: Futari wa Pretty Cure Max Heart, Futari wa Pretty Cure Splash Star, and Yes! PreCure 5 GoGo!, Echo rekindles her friendship with Fū-chan. As the remaining Fusion fragments gets ready to attack Ayumi, Fū-chan sacrifices himself to give the Smile team the powers to defeat the evil side. Afterwards, Ayumi grows more confident and starts making friends with her classmates.

== Voice cast ==
Smile PreCure! cast

- Misato Fukuen as Miyuki Hoshizora/Cure Happy
- Asami Tano as Akane Hino/Cure Sunny
- Hisako Kanemoto as Yayoi Kise/Cure Peace
- Marina Inoue as Nao Midorikawa/Cure March
- Chinami Nishimura as Reika Aoki/Cure Beauty
- Ikue Ōtani as Candy

Suite PreCure cast

- Ami Koshimizu as Hibiki Hojo/Cure Melody
- Fumiko Orikasa as Kanade Minamino/Cure Rhythm
- Megumi Toyoguchi as Siren/Ellen Kurokawa/Cure Beat
- Rumi Okubo as Ako Shirabe/Cure Muse
- Kotono Mitsuishi as Hummy

HeartCatch PreCure! cast

- Nana Mizuki as Tsubomi Hanasaki/Cure Blossom
- Fumie Mizusawa as Erika Kurumi/Cure Marine
- Houko Kuwashima as Itsuki Miyoudouin/Cure Sunshine
- Aya Hisakawa as Yuri Tsukikage/Cure Moonlight
- Taeko Kawata as Chypre
- Motoko Kumai as Coffret
- Kokoro Kikuchi as Potpurri

Fresh Pretty Cure! cast

- Kanae Oki as Love Momozono/Cure Peach
- Eri Kitamura as Miki Aono/Cure Berry
- Akiko Nakagawa as Inori Yamabuki/Cure Pine
- Yuka Komatsu as Setsuna Higashi/Cure Passion
- Taiki Matsuno as Tart
- Satomi Kōrogi as Chiffon

Film characters

- Mamiko Noto as Ayumi Sakagami/Cure Echo
- Tamao Akae as Ayumi's mother
- Takehito Koyasu as Fusion
- Sea Kumada as Fuu-chan

== Production ==
In November 2011, it was announced that new Pretty Cure All Stars was in development, featuring the villain Fusion from the very first film. Pretty Cure episode director Junji Shimizu will act as a director, and Yes! PreCure 5 GoGo! head writer Yoshimi Narita will provide the screenplay, while Mitsuru Aoyama will return from Pretty Cure All Stars DX trilogy to design the characters and provide the animation direction for the film, and music composer Yasuharu Takanashi. A Yokohama city tie-in campaign was announced in February 2012 by its city mayor, Fumiko Hayashi.

== Release ==
The film was released in theaters in Japan on March 17, 2012.

== Reception ==
=== Box office ===
The film ranked number 5 out of top 10 in the Japanese box office in its fourth weekend.
