= Aikatsu Friends! season 1 =

Aikatsu Friends!
- Season 1
- No. of episodes: 50

Release
- Original network: TV Tokyo
- Original release: April 12, 2018 – March 28, 2019

Season chronology
- ← Previous; Aikatsu Stars! season 2 Next → Aikatsu Friends! season 2

The following is a list of episodes for the first season of BN Pictures' Aikatsu Friends! television series, which will air on TV Tokyo between April 4, 2018, and March 3, 2019. From episode 1 to 25, the opening theme is "Thank You⇄Alright" (ありがと⇄大丈夫, Arigato⇄Daijōbu) by Aine and Mio from Best Friends!, while the ending theme is "Believe it" by Karen and Mirai from the same group. From episode 26 to 50, the opening theme is "What is Only There" (そこにしかないもの, Soko ni Shikanai Mono) by Aine and Mio, while the ending theme is "Pride" (プライド Puraido) by Karen and Mirai.

== Episode list ==
No.	Title	Original release date
1	"Hello Friends!"; Transliteration: "Harō Furenzu!" (Japanese: ハローフレンズ！)	April 5, 2018
During the spring break preceding her second year in junior high school, a regular division student named Aine Yūki encounters the top idol, Mio Minato. With her great talent to make friends, Aine easily befriends Mio, having just one request to her: How about performing together on the Aikatsu! stage.
2	"The Invincible Love Me Tear☆"; Transliteration: "Muteki no Rabu Mī Tia ☆" (Japanese: 無敵のラブミーティア☆)	April 12, 2018
Upon transferring to the academy's idol division, Aine happens to belong to the same 'Production' as Mio, being excited to get her very first job from her manager, Tamaki. On her place of work, the top idol unit that is ruling the Aikatsu! world, Love Me Tear's Karen Kamishiro and Mirai Asuka, appear.
3	"Vivid Inspiration"; Transliteration: "Bibitto Insupirēshon" (Japanese: ビビっとインスピレーション)	April 19, 2018
Taking dress design up as well, Mio announces the reveal of her Premium Rare Dress in a week. However, she gets the feeling that there is something missing and is not sure about approving the dress' design. Meanwhile, Aine becomes Mio's "one-day apprentice".
4	"The Aspiring My Brand"; Transliteration: "Akogare no Mai Burando" (Japanese: 憧れのマイブランド)	April 26, 2018
With the advice given to her by her production company's stylist, Chiharu, the still idol-egg Aine begins her search for a brand that fits her. Although so many brands are around, it seems neither works.
5	"Maika, Like a Butterfly!"; Transliteration: "Chō no yō ni, Maika!" (Japanese: 蝶のように 舞花！)	May 3, 2018
Wanting people to discover the brand only for her, Sugar Melody, Aine thoughtlessly enters an audition to be the MC in Love Me Tear's event. On the venue, she meets Maika Chōno, an idol who loves festivals.
6	"Hinata Emergency!?"; Transliteration: "Hinata Emājenshī!?" (Japanese: 日向エマージェンシー！？)	May 10, 2018
A senior student named Ema Hinata showed off her leadership skills even at a camp that she went to. However, Mio is not fitting in well with this environment, causing a chain on confusions.
7	"The Ongoing Road towards Mirai"; Transliteration: "Mirai e Tsudzuku Michi" (Japanese: ミライへ続く道★)	May 17, 2018
Upon being selected by Love Me Tear's Mirai for a guest role in the drama "That Idol's a Witch!", Aine is supposed to memorize her lines and practice well. However, Aine keeps making mistakes, so seeing her in such a situation, Mirai decides to take her out for some time.
8	"Mio's Grand CM Operation!"; Transliteration: "Mio no CM Daisakusen!" (Japanese: みおのCM大作戦！)	May 24, 2018
A famous world-class creator is to be chosen as a director for a commercial for macarons, with Mio going to be filming the commercial when they are faced with a surprise. However, the background music is an Ondo, and is not fit for a macaron commercial. It is up to Mio to make an impactful "Big Bang" CM when nothing goes as she had predicted.
9	"The Melody of Courage"; Transliteration: "Yūki no Merodī" (Japanese: 勇気のメロディ)	May 31, 2018
Upon asking Coco from Aikatsu Navi and learning that if she is an "amazing idol", Aine obtains a premium rare dress. In order to let herself be more well known among the fans, Aine begins to plot a fan meeting of her own.
10	"Prett Sexy Honey Cat!"; Transliteration: "Puritī ☆ Sekushī ★ Hanī Kyatto!" (Japanese: プリティー☆セクシー★ハニーキャット！)	June 7, 2018
Ema and Maika are searching for a Friends partner. From an outside perspective, the two fit each other perfectly, going against their expectations. Although their personalities and preferences are polar opposites, no matter how the two look at it, they have the best compatibility.
11	"The Dramatic Confession!"; Transliteration: "Kokuhaku wa Doramachikku!" (Japanese: 告白はドラマチック！)	June 14, 2018
Mio finally begins to take action in order to form a Friends unit with Aine. She aspires for a dramatic situation like with Love Me Tear's legendary formation story. While seeking the perfect timing to speak with Aine, for some reason, Aine seems to be intimate with Nako Ebihara, an idol from Nagoya.
12	"Tomatoes, Bring It On☆"; Transliteration: "Tomato, Dōnto Koi ☆" (Japanese: トマト、どーんとコイ☆)	June 21, 2018
Mio wants to go to school with Aine everyday, but is unable to say it. At this time, a large amount of tomatoes are delivered to the Penguin Cafe. Having been present, Mio is roped into helping out with a cafe event as the Yūki family's event is almost closed.
13	"How to Karen"; Transliteration: "How to Karen-san" (Japanese: How to カレンさん)	June 28, 2018
In order to get Pure Palette's name more well-known, Aine and Mio are to appear on the TV program "Genius Battle Selection". However, Karen Kamishiro reigns as the absolute queen of geniuses on the show. Admiring and aiming to surpass them, Mio comes to face Love Me Tear, and learns the essentials of Aikatsu! from Karen.
14	"Go Go Friends!"; Transliteration: "Gō Gō Furenzu!" (Japanese: ゴーゴーフレンズ！)	July 5, 2018
Ema is asked to design Honey Cat's Best Friends Rare Dresses. While attempting to bring together both their dress designs, as Ema and Maika's tastes are polar opposites in the first place, they cannot come up with a design that makes use of each other's personalities.
15	"AiTube☆Cinderella"; Transliteration: "AiChūbu☆Shindereru" (Japanese: アイチューブ☆シンデレラ)	July 19, 2018
After four months have passed since Aine has begun her Aikatsu!, she even uploads "tried to do" videos onto AiTube under Mio's instruction, but the number of views do not increase much. Mio, assessing the situation, seems to become aware of Aine's greatest talent.
16	"Mio, Becoming the Hero"; Transliteration: "Mio, Yūsha ni naru" (Japanese: みお、勇者になる)	July 26, 2018
Mio starts getting pumped up for she is trying to design a Best Friends Rare dress for Pure Palette. When Mio reaches a wall in designing, Aine invites Mio on a mystery tour planned by Aine herself. Walking along the lands of the forest, they reach the place known as "Hero's Bridge".
17	"The Encounter of Fate is of the Moon's Guidance"; Transliteration: "Unmei no Deai wa Tsuki no Michibiki" (Japanese: 運命の出会いは月の導き)	August 2, 2018
A young fortune-teller named Sakuya Shirayuri pays a visit to Penguin Café, and gives Aine and Mio a reading in regards to their upcoming audition. Understanding the meaning behind the reading, the two have a task to create a big bang.
18	"Even a Slight Chance"; Transliteration: "Wazu ka na Chansu Sae Mo" (Japanese: わずかなチャンスさえも)	August 9, 2018
As the school's event, the Star Harmony Cup, is about to begin, Honey Cat is having a training camp in the gym so they can pull off a Friends Appeal worthy of their dresses. The two undergo lessons while also busy with work.
19	"Let it Reach! Friends' Power"; Transliteration: "Todoke! Tomodachi kara" (Japanese: 届け！トモダチカラ)	August 16, 2018
In order for Pure Palette to win the Star Harmony Cup, Aine aims to raise her abilities. Unusually separating herself from her friends and family, Aine trains extra hard by herself. As a result, though her dancing and singing have improved, she is missing something important.
20	"Lacrosse or Friends!"; Transliteration: "Lakurosu or Furenzu!" (Japanese: ラクロスorフレンズ!)	August 23, 2018
Ema and Maika regret losing to Pure Palette. Feeling that their defeat was a result of being unable to face their fans, they plan out a fan meeting tour. However, the day of the event overlaps with Ema's lacrosse club's training camp.
21	"Spreading Harmony♪"; Transliteration: "Hirogaru Hāmonī♪" (Japanese: 広がるハーモニー♪)	August 30, 2018
Aine and the others volunteer to be visitor guides at the academy's open day. Joined by powerful visitors from all countries, they observe the ongoing events of the school. Hearing participants who say that there is no need for Friends, Aine enters a situation where her friendship power is ineffective.
22	"Premonition of the Full Moon"; Transliteration: "Mangetsu no Yokan" (Japanese: 満月の予感)	September 6, 2018
In order to protect Sakuya's reputation as a fortune-teller, her sister Kaguya fills in for her while she does her Aikatsu!
23	"Shout It at the Moment"; Transliteration: "Sakebu Shunkan" (Japanese: 叫ぶ、瞬間)	September 13, 2018
Still upset over losing to Pure Palette, Maika has yet to tell her parents she will not be competing in the Brilliant Friends Cup. As Maika struggles to hide the truth, it begins to affect her work. The designer of Dancing Mirage, Maika's favorite brand, tells her she isn't ready to become the brand's muse. Feeling lost about what to do, Ema steps in to help.
24	"Rivals are Friends!"; Transliteration: "Raibaru wa Furenzu!" (Japanese: ライバルはフレンズ！)	September 20, 2018
Pure Palette and Reflect Moon are planned to appear on a variety show with Love Me Tear. Although Sakura is nervous about her first variety show appearance and Kaguya is unable to understand something amazing about Love Me Tear, the two go to the recording.
25	"Surpass Love Me Tear!"; Transliteration: "Rabu Mī Tia o Koero!" (Japanese: ラブミーティアをこえろ！)	September 27, 2018
Mio is asked to cover for Love Me Tear on a variety show when the Friends get stuck abroad. However, Mio is initially reluctant to accept the offer as she still feels she is far from surpassing Love Me Tear. Mio prepares thoroughly for the show and things go well, but when a surprise guest appears, she needs to pull all her skills and resources to perform successfully.
26	"Friends Gathered - Autumn of Aikatsu"; Transliteration: "Furenzu Shūgō - Aikatsu no Aki" (Japanese: フレンズ集合-アイカツの秋)	October 4, 2018
As the Brilliant Friends Cup begins, Pure Palette are in high spirits as they stand before rivals from all over Japan. However, in stark contrast to these feelings, Aine and Mio are starting to develop a slight disconnect between each other.
27	"Full Moon's Radiance"; Transliteration: "Furu Mūn no Kagayaki" (Japanese: フルムーンの輝き)	October 11, 2018
Afraid of her own divination, Sakuya withdraws to her dressing room and refuses to come out. Although another divination says if tonight is a full moon, that disaster will go away with the moon being a half moon.
28	"Friends Even When We're Alone"; Transliteration: "Hitori demo Furenzu" (Japanese: ひとりでもフレンズ)	October 18, 2018
As Mio gains a fever, she takes a rest at home under the care of her mother Reiko. Looking at how Reiko works, Mio has started to realize her own faults. She is about to make a large decision for the future of Pure Palette.
29	"Aine's Halloween Panic!"; Transliteration: "Aine no Harowin Panikku!" (Japanese: あいねのハロウィンパニック！)	October 25, 2018
Aine is set to appear again as a guest in the drama "Maiden Idol is a Witch" starring Mirai. She is determined to get things right first time, but Mirai begins asking her to repeat her scenes saying Aine is not playing the part correctly. With the climax of the show a stage battle with Mirai, Aine wonders if she has what it takes to beat her senior.
30	"Dubbing Challenge, Mio"; Transliteration: "Afureko Charenji Mio" (Japanese: アフレコチャレンジ★みお)	November 1, 2018
As Mio and Kaguya try their first voice acting job in an animated film, struggles with ad-lib but is surprised how well Kaguya handles things. Mio wonders what she needs to overcome her barrier and talks to Kaguya about her motivation.
31	"The Legendary 101st Match!"; Transliteration: "Densetsu no 101-ban shōbu!" (Japanese: 伝説の101番勝負！)	November 8, 2018
With one day remaining until the deadline to enter the Best Friends Cup expires, Aine and Mio decide to re-debut after taking a break from their activities as Friends. However, the two do not want to restart with half-hearted feelings, so they take a chapter from Love Me Tear's story and attempt to complete a Legendary 101 Match battle.
32	"Heart-Pounding☆Adventure on Karen Island!"; Transliteration: "Dokidoki ☆ Bōken Karen-jima!" (Japanese: ドキドキ☆冒険カレン島！)	November 15, 2018
The last opportunity to participate in the Diamond Friends Cup, the Best Friends Cup begins, with Karen Island owned by the Kamishiro family being the stage. This year's theme is "survival", and first up is Honey Cat.
33	"Kaboom! Adventure on the Volcano Island"; Transliteration: "Dokkan! Bōken Kazan-shima" (Japanese: ドッカ～ン冒険カザン島)	November 22, 2018
The second part of the Best Friends Cup starts, with Pure Palette taking their turn to face the challenges before them.
34	"Happiness to Everyone"; Transliteration: "Minna ni Hapinesu" (Japanese: みんなにハピネス)	November 29, 2018
Aine is given the opportunity to debut a new premium rare dress for Sugar Melody. However, with only three days to complete the dress before the debut concert, she struggles to find ideas.
35	"Treasure Hunter Warning!"; Transliteration: "Torejā Hantā Chūihō!" (Japanese: トレジャーハンター注意報！)	December 6, 2018
Sakuya and Kaguya appear on TV with Aine and her friends before being given the task of producing a video tour of their home. Aine and the others offer to help and end up discovering a treasure map that leads to some treasure the twins buried when they were younger. The girls feel that going on a treasure hunt and filming it would make a much better video, but Sakuya and Kaguya are reluctant to go and find what they buried.
36	"Runway of Trouble!"; Transliteration: "Haran no Ranwei!" (Japanese: 波乱のランウェイ！)	December 13, 2018
Mio is hosting a fashion show that will introduce her new premium rare dress for her brand. However, not all things go to plan when Aine's little sister Momone shows up and wants to be in the show, as one of her guests appears to be late. Luckily, Mio has an idea to turn things around.
37	"Merry Friends Christmas"; Transliteration: "Merī Furenzu Kurisumasu" (Japanese: メリーフレンズクリスマス)	December 20, 2018
The line-up for the Diamond Friends Cup is decided with Pure Palette facing Honey Cat on the first day. With Christmas around the corner, the members of Best Friends! decide to exchange gifts, but Aine has trouble finding the right gift for Mio.
38	"I'm Coco! Aikatsu Song Battle"; Transliteration: "Koko da yo! Aikatsu Utagassen" (Japanese: ココだよ！ アイカツ歌合戦)	December 27, 2018
Love Me Tear is hosting the annual Aikatsu Song Battle with Karen captain of the White team and Mirai captain of the Red team. Members of Pure Palette, Honey Cat and Reflect Moon divide between the two teams and perform songs for the audience. However back stage there's a mystery to solve, when Coco suddenly disappears from the Aikatsu Mobile the idols decide to investigate.
39	"Opening! Diamond Friends Cup"; Transliteration: "Kaimaku! Daiyamondo Furenzu Kappu" (Japanese: 開幕！ダイヤモンドフレンズカップ)	January 10, 2019
The Diamond Friends Cup is about to start with Honey Cat facing Pure Palette. However, Pure Palette is worried they will not be able to pull off a Miracle Appeal despite practicing. Honey Cat reveals that they also have been unable to replicate their Appeal in training, so both teams work together to unlock the secret of the Miracle Appeal.
40	"Believe it"	January 17, 2019
The next round of the Diamond Friends Cup features Reflect Moon facing Love Me Tear. Despite Sakuya's divination that they will be victorious, Kaguya is still worried she will never be able to match her sister's skill as an idol. However, not only Kaguya that feels worried, Mirai notices Karen is having her own doubts.
41	"Unleash the Love Me Zone!"; Transliteration: "Rabu Mī Zōn o Tokihanate!" (Japanese: ラブミーゾーンを解き放て！)	January 24, 2019
Aine and Mio think about what more they can do before the final round of the Diamond Friends Cup against Love Me Tear. To their surprise, Mirai shows up at Aine's home and tells the girl about Karen. Karen has been holding back her abilities as an idol ever since she and Mirai became Diamond Friends because the Friends unit, the two competed against dropped out, fearing they would never be able to match Love Me Tear. Mirai wants to go all out against Pure Palette and unleash the Love Me Zone, Love Me Tear's own version of the Aikatsu Zone, but is afraid that Karen's feelings will prevent it. However, Aine comes up with an idea to hold a sleepover at her house so both Friends groups can get to know each other better, hopefully convincing Karen to open up about her feelings.
42	"The Miracle of Friends' Power"; Transliteration: "Tomodachikara no Kiseki" (Japanese: トモダチカラのキセキ)	January 31, 2019
With Love Me Tear's full power performance almost over, Pure Palette takes them to the stage. However, both Aine and Mio realize the power of the Love Me Zone and are afraid they will never be able to match it. As they promised Karen and Mirai, both girls make a pledge to their fans for support before taking a breather. However, things take a surprising turn when the girls see their fans' reactions.
43	"The Scenery of Gratitude"; Transliteration: "Arigatō no Keshiki" (Japanese: ありがとうの景色)	February 7, 2019
Aine and Mio hold a concert for the reveal of their Diamond Dresses. As part of that concert, the members of Best Friends! want to thank their fans for their support. Mio gets a surprise when her father shows up to attend the concert, and a secret about the Diamond Dresses is revealed.
44	"The Chocolate and Mint Confession"; Transliteration: "Chokotto Minto na Kokuhaku" (Japanese: チョコっとミントな告白)	February 14, 2019
On Valentine's Day, Mio is asked to do a commercial for the chocolate and mint Macarons she has been promoting, so she decides to mix it up a bit and make the commercial about it. All Mio needs to do is find the right boys to star in the commercial.
45	"The Friends are Paparazzi!?"; Transliteration: "Tomodachi wa Paparatchi!?" (Japanese: 友達はパパラッチ！？)	February 21, 2019
Tamaki warns Aine and Mio that now they are Diamonds Friends, people will be looking to get news stories on them, so the three must be their guard. Tamaki's warning soon comes to frustration when a rookie Paparazzi reporter named Habara shows up and tries to get a scoop on the Friends. For this reason, Aine finds it an opportunity to get to know Habara and provide insight into Pure Palette.
46	"The Princess from the Moon"; Transliteration: "Tsuki kara kita Purinsesu" (Japanese: 月から来たプリンセス)	February 28, 2019
Sakuya and Kaguya are getting a lot of work now they are popular idols. However, Kaguya believes that in order to maintain their popularity, they must keep up their "idols from the moon" roleplay. However, things seem to backfire when the twins have taken it too far.
47	"An Idol's Coco-mprehension★"; Transliteration: "Aidoru no Kokoroe★" (Japanese: アイドルのココろえ★)	March 7, 2019
Coco develops an interest to Aine and Mio, and begins to wonder what it's like to be an idol. Aine and her friends are surprised when Coco asked them if they would Aikatsu with her and takes them into her digital world.
48	"The Cats' Honey Work"; Transliteration: "Kyatto-tachi no Hanī na oshigoto" (Japanese: キャットたちのハニーなお仕事)	March 14, 2019
Maika and Ema want to visit their fans around the world so the two planning a world tour for Honey Cat, but they do not have the funds to go on the tour yet. As the two start a funding page to raise money and continue doing their Aikatsu!, things take an interesting turn when they find a lost cat and vow to find its owner.
49	"The Last Chapter of the Legend"; Transliteration: "Densetsu no Saishūshō" (Japanese: 伝説の最終章)	March 21, 2019
Karen and Mirai announced that they will be going their separate ways in order of each of them to pursue their own individual Aikatsu!
50	"The Future That's Only There"; Transliteration: "Soko ni Shikanai Mirai" (Japanese: そこにしかない未来)	March 28, 2019
Aine and Mio get into their first big fight as Friends. Mirai orchestrates a "Making Up Ceremony" for the pair to show them that fighting is part of being Friends, as well as for her own amusement.
