= Misato Fukuen =

Japanese actress and voice actress

- 福圓 美里
- Born: Misato Sakuragi; Tokyo, Japan
- Occupations: Actress; voice actress
- Years active: 1998–present
- Agent: StarCrew
- Notable credits: Honkai: Star Rail as Sushang; To Love Ru as Golden Darkness; Black Cat as Eve; Darker than Black as Yin; Strike Witches as Yoshika Miyafuji; Pokémon as Oshawott; Haganai as Rika Shiguma; Girls und Panzer as Anzu Kadotani; JoJo's Bizarre Adventure: Stardust Crusaders as Iggy; Sailor Moon Crystal as Chibiusa/Sailor Chibi Moon; My Hero Academia as Himiko Toga; Soul Eater as Eruka Frog; Smile Pretty Cure! as Miyuki Hoshizora/Cure Happy

Misato Fukuen (福圓 美里, Fukuen Misato) is a Japanese actress and voice actress affiliated with StarCrew. Her real name is Misato Sakuragi (桜木 美里, Sakuragi Misato). She has also performed activities as a singer under the name of MIRI.

== Filmography ==
=== TV anime ===
| Year | Title | Role | Note |
|---|---|---|---|
| 2000 | Boys Be... | Aya Kurihara | |
| 2001 | Prétear | Hajime | |
| 2003 | Battle Programmer Shirase | Amano Misao | |
| 2004 | Fafner in the Azure | Seri Tatekami | |
| 2004 | The Marshmallow Times | Sandy | |
| 2004 | Mezzo DSA | Kanako | |
| 2005 | Hell Girl | Meguro | |
| 2005 | Black Cat | Eve, Tearju Lunatique | |
| 2005 | Fushigiboshi no Futagohime | Princess Lione | |
| 2005 | Ultimate Girls | Silk Koharuno | |
| 2006 | Witchblade | Yūki Sasaki | |
| 2006 | Crash B-Daman | Konta Tsukino | |
| 2006 | Bincho-tan | Chiku-rin | |
| 2006 | Futari wa Pretty Cure Splash Star | Tomoya | |
| 2006 | Hataraki Man | Mayu Nagisa | |
| 2006 | Honey x Honey Drops | Yuzuru Hagino | |
| 2006 | Ryusei no Rockman | Hibiki Misora | |
| 2006 | Red Garden | Lise Harriette Meyer | |
| 2006 | Le Chevalier D'Eon | Belle | |
| 2007 | AIKa R-16: Virgin Mission | Eri Shinkai | |
| 2007 | Darker than Black | Yin | |
| 2007 | Devil May Cry | Patty Lowell | |
| 2007 | Hidamari Sketch | Natsume | |
| 2007 | Ōkiku Furikabutte | Chiyo Shino'oka | |
| 2007 | Shining Tears X Wind | Ryuna | |
| 2008 | Allison & Lillia | Carlo | |
| 2008 | Sands of Destruction | Annie | |
| 2008 | A Certain Magical Index | Maika Tsuchimikado | |
| 2008 | Hidamari Sketch x365 | Natsume | |
| 2008 | Rosario + Vampire | Kurumu Kurono | |
| 2008 | Rosario + Vampire Capu2 | Kurumu Kurono | |
| 2008 | Soul Eater | Eruka Frog | |
| 2008 | Strike Witches | Yoshika Miyafuji | |
| 2008 | To Love Ru | Golden Darkness | |
| 2008 | Yozakura Quartet | Hime Yarizakura | |
| 2009 | Aika Zero | Eri Shinkai | |
| 2009 | Darker Than Black: Ryūsei no Gemini | Yin | |
| 2009 | Fullmetal Alchemist: Brotherhood | Elicia Hughes | |
| 2009 | Triggerheart Exelica -Enhanced- | C'r_na | |
| 2010 | A Certain Magical Index II | Maika Tsuchimikado | |
| 2010 | A Certain Scientific Railgun | Maika Tsuchimikado | |
| 2010 | Durarara!! | Saki Mikajima | |
| 2010 | Hidamari Sketch x☆☆☆ | Natsume | |
| 2010 | Pocket Monsters: Best Wishes | Langley (Georgia); Satoshi's Mijumaru (Ash's Oshawott) Joy's Tabunne (Nurse Joy's Audino) | |
| 2010 | Sound of the Sky | Yumina | |
| 2010 | Strike Witches 2 | Yoshika Miyafuji | |
| 2010 | Motto To Love Ru | Golden Darkness (Konjiki no Yami) | |
| 2010 | Ōkiku Furikabutte | Chiyo Shinooka | |
| 2011 | Wolverine | Min | |
| 2011 | Blood-C | Nene Motoe, Nono Motoe | |
| 2011 | Boku wa Tomodachi ga Sukunai | Rika Shiguma | |
| 2011 | Kamisama Dolls | Utao Kuga | |
| 2011 | Shōwa Monogatari | Yūko Yamazaki | |
| 2012 | Accel World | Cobalt Blade | |
| 2012 | Another | Takako Sugiura | |
| 2012 | Girls und Panzer | Anzu Kadotani | |
| 2012 | Hidamari Sketch x Honeycomb | Natsume | |
| 2012 | Nazo no Kanojo X | Yōko Tsubaki | |
| 2012 | Pocket Monsters: Best Wishes! Season 2 | Langley (Georgia); Satoshi's Mijumaru (Ash's Oshawott) Joy's Tabunne (Nurse Joy's Audino) | |
| 2012 | Sankarea: Undying Love | Bābu | |
| 2012 | Smile PreCure! | Miyuki Hoshizora/Cure Happy | |
| 2012 | So, I Can't Play H! | Iria Fukumune | |
| 2012 | Tasogare Otome x Amnesia | Momoe Okonogi | |
| 2012 | Tamagotchi! | Yumemitchi | |
| 2012 | The Ambition of Oda Nobuna | Inuchiyo Maeda | |
| 2012 | To Love Ru Darkness | Golden Darkness (Konjiki no Yami); Tearju Lunatique | |
| 2013 | Boku wa Tomodachi ga Sukunai NEXT | Rika Shiguma | |
| 2013 | A Certain Scientific Railgun S | Maika Tsuchimikado | |
| 2013 | Maoyu | Female Magician | |
| 2013 | Non Non Biyori | Hikage Miyauchi | |
| 2013 | Pocket Monsters: Best Wishes! Season 2: Episode N | Satoshi's Mijumaru (Ash's Oshawott) Joy's Tabunne (Nurse Joy's Audino) | |
| 2013 | Pocket Monsters: Best Wishes! Season 2: Decolora Adventure | Satoshi's Mijumaru (Ash's Oshawott) Joy's Tabunne (Nurse Joy's Audino) | |
| 2013 | Valvrave the Liberator | Marie Nobi | |
| 2013 | Yozakura Quartet ~Hana no Uta~ | Hime Yarizakura | |
| 2014 | Dragon Collection | Puppy | |
| 2014 | M3 the dark metal | Maamu Yuzuki | |
| 2014 | The Kindaichi Case Files R | Miharu Ushio | |
| 2014 | Magimoji Rurumo | Chiro | |
| 2014 | Shinryaku!! Ika Musume | Keiko Furukawa | |
| 2015 | Durarara!!x2 | Saki Mikajima | |
| 2015 | JoJo's Bizarre Adventure: Stardust Crusaders | Iggy | |
| 2015 | Fafner in the Azure: -EXODUS- | Seri Tatekami | |
| 2015 | To Love Ru Darkness 2nd | Golden Darkness (Konjiki no Yami); Tearju Lunatique | |
| 2015 | Non Non Biyori Repeat | Hikage Miyauchi | |
| 2015 | Magical Girl Lyrical Nanoha ViVid | Corona Timil | |
| 2015 | Plastic Memories | Sōta Wakanae | |
| 2016 | Pretty Guardian Sailor Moon Crystal Season III | Chibiusa/Sailor Chibi Moon | Death Busters arc |
| 2016 | Aokana: Four Rhythm Across the Blue | Asuka Kurashina | |
| 2016 | Haruchika | Yaeko Fujima | |
| 2016 | Brave Witches | Yoshika Miyafuji | |
| 2016 | Tales of Zestiria the X | Edna | |
| 2016 | Fate/kaleid liner Prisma Illya 3rei! | Tanaka | |
| 2017 | BanG Dream! | Natsuki Umino | |
| 2017 | Tales of Zestiria the X Season 2 | Edna | |
| 2017 | 18if | Natsuki Kamikawa | |
| 2017 | Two Car | Nagisa Suzuki | |
| 2017 | My Hero Academia Season 2 | Himiko Toga | |
| 2017 | Hitorijime My Hero | Megumi Setagawa | |
| 2018 | Beatless | Asuna Kisaragi | |
| 2018 | My Hero Academia Season 3 | Himiko Toga | |
| 2018 | Lord of Vermilion: The Crimson King | Yuri Shiraki | |
| 2019 | Strike Witches 501st Unit, Taking Off! | Yoshika Miyafuji | |
| 2019 | My Hero Academia Season 4 | Himiko Toga | |
| 2019 | The Ones Within | Murasaki Ueno | |
| 2019 | Val × Love | Ur | |
| 2020 | In/Spectre | Saki Mihara | |
| 2020 | Strike Witches: Road to Berlin | Yoshika Miyafuji | |
| 2020 | The Island of Giant Insects | Matsuoka Ayumi | |
| 2021 | Non Non Biyori Nonstop | Hikage Miyauchi | |
| 2021 | Dragon Goes House-Hunting | Nell | |
| 2021 | World Witches Take Off! | Yoshika Miyafuji | |
| 2021 | My Hero Academia Season 5 | Himiko Toga | |
| 2022 | Dance Dance Danseur | Natsuki Oikawa | |
| 2022 | Luminous Witches | Yoshika Miyafuji | |
| 2022 | My Hero Academia Season 6 | Himiko Toga | |
| 2023 | Dead Mount Death Play | Koyū Azuma | |
| 2023 | Heavenly Delusion | Mimihime | |
| 2024 | Gushing over Magical Girls | Venalita | |
| 2024 | The Many Sides of Voice Actor Radio | Mirei Asaka | |
| 2024 | My Hero Academia Season 7 | Himiko Toga | |
| 2024 | Pokémon Horizons: The Series | Seille | |
| 2025 | 9-Nine: Ruler's Crown | Miyako Kujō | |
| 2026 | Champignon Witch | Sisi | |
| 2026 | A Misanthrope Teaches a Class for Demi-Humans | Machi Nezu | |
| 2026 | Daemons of the Shadow Realm | Daikyo | |
| 2026 | The Ogre's Bride | Sara Kiryūin | |

=== Original net animation ===
| Year | Title | Role | Note |
|---|---|---|---|
| 2015 | Pretty Guardian Sailor Moon Crystal Season II | Chibiusa, Black Lady | Black Moon arc |
| 2024 | The Grimm Variations | Charlotte, Gretel | |

=== Original video animation ===
- To Love Ru – Golden Darkness
- To Love Ru Darkness – Golden Darkness
- Mobile Suit Gundam: The Origin – Fraw Bow

=== Theatrical animation ===
| Year | Title | Role | Note |
|---|---|---|---|
| 2006 | Doraemon: Nobita's Dinosaur 2006 | Boy | |
| 2006 | Animal Crossing: The Movie | Rosie the Cat | |
| 2008 | Hells | Linne Amagane | |
| 2010 | Fafner in the Azure: Heaven and Earth | Seri Tatekami | |
| 2011 | Pocket Monsters Best Wishes! the Movie – Victini and the Black Hero: Zekrom | Leeku; Satoshi's Mijumaru (Ash's Oshawott) | |
| 2011 | Pocket Monsters Best Wishes! the Movie – Victini and the White Hero: Reshiram | Leeku; Satoshi's Mijumaru (Ash's Oshawott) | |
| 2011 | Shōwa Monogatari | Yūko Yamazaki | |
| 2012 | Pretty Cure All Stars New Stage: Friends of the Future | Miyuki Hoshizora/Cure Happy | |
| 2012 | Strike Witches: The Movie | Yoshika Miyafuji | |
| 2012 | Pocket Monsters Best Wishes! the Movie – Kyurem VS the Sacred Swordsman: Keldeo | Satoshi's Mijumaru (Ash's Oshawott) | |
| 2012 | Blood-C: The Last Dark | Nene Motoe, Nono Motoe | |
| 2012 | Smile PreCure! the Movie: Big Mismatch in a Picture Book! | Miyuki Hoshizora/Cure Happy | |
| 2013 | Pocket Monsters Best Wishes! the Movie – ExtremeSpeed Genesect: Mewtwo Awakens | Satoshi's Mijumaru (Ash's Oshawott) | |
| 2013 | Pretty Cure All Stars New Stage 2: Friends of the Heart | Miyuki Hoshizora/Cure Happy | |
| 2014 | Pretty Cure All Stars New Stage 3: Eternal Friends | Miyuki Hoshizora/Cure Happy | |
| 2015 | Pretty Cure All Stars: Spring Carnival | Miyuki Hoshizora/Cure Happy | |
| 2015 | Girls und Panzer der Film | Anzu Kadotani | |
| 2016 | Pretty Cure All Stars: Singing with Everyone! Miraculous Magic! | Miyuki Hoshizora/Cure Happy | |
| 2017 | Girls und Panzer das Finale: Part 1 | Anzu Kadotani | |
| 2018 | Hug! Pretty Cure Futari wa Pretty Cure: All Stars Memories | Miyuki Hoshizora/Cure Happy | |
| 2018 | Non Non Biyori Vacation | Hikage Miyauchi | |
| 2019 | My Hero Academia: Heroes Rising | Himiko Toga | |
| 2019 | Girls und Panzer das Finale: Part 2 | Anzu Kadotani, Giant Panda | |
| 2021 | Pretty Guardian Sailor Moon Eternal The Movie | Chibiusa/Super Sailor Chibi Moon | 2-Part Film, Season 4 of Sailor Moon Crystal (Dead Moon arc) |
| 2021 | Girls und Panzer das Finale: Part 3 | Anzu Kadotani | |
| 2022 | Mobile Suit Gundam: Cucuruz Doan's Island | Fraw Bow | |
| 2023 | Pretty Guardian Sailor Moon Cosmos The Movie | Chibiusa/Eternal Sailor Chibi Moon | 2-Part Film, Season 5 of Sailor Moon Crystal (Shadow Galactica arc) |
| 2023 | Pretty Cure All Stars F | Miyuki Hoshizora/Cure Happy | |
| 2023 | Girls und Panzer das Finale: Part 4 | Anzu Kadotani | |
| 2024 | Mobile Suit Gundam SEED Freedom | Redelard Tradoll | |

=== Tokusatsu ===
- Ultraman Z (2020) – Kanegon
- Kikai Sentai Zenkaiger (2021) – Secchan
- Kamen Rider Gotchard (2023) – Hopper1

=== Video games ===
- Rosario + Vampire: Tanabata's Miss Yokai Academy (2008) – Kurumu Kurono
- Street Fighter IV (2009) – Sakura Kasugano
- Star Ocean: The Last Hope (2009) – Reimi Saionji
- Rosario + Vampire Capu2: The Rhapsody of Love and Dreams (2009) – Kurumu Kurono
- Tokimeki Memorial 4 (2009) – Miyako Okura
- Super Street Fighter IV (2010) – Sakura Kasugano
- Super Street Fighter IV: Arcade Edition (2010) – Sakura Kasugano
- Super Street Fighter IV: 3D Edition (2011) – Sakura Kasugano
- Your Diary (2011) – Natsuki Fujimura
- Street Fighter X Tekken (2012) – Sakura Kasugano
- Granblue Fantasy (2014) – Carmelina
- Ultra Street Fighter IV (2014) – Sakura Kasugano
- Oreshika: Tainted Bloodlines (2014) – Kochin
- Ao no Kanata no Four Rhythm (2014) – Asuka Kurashina
- Tales of Zestiria (2015) – Edna
- Return to PopoloCrois: A Story of Seasons Fairytale (2015) – Mayuri
- Fate/Grand Order (2015) – Osakabehime
- Closers (2015) – Tina
- Sakura no Uta (2015) – Ai Natsume
- JoJo's Bizarre Adventure: Eyes of Heaven (2015) – Iggy
- Street Fighter V (2016) – Sakura Kasugano
- Azur Lane (2017) – Ibuki
- Persona Q2: New Cinema Labyrinth (2018) – Hikari
- Arknights (2019) – GreyThroat
- Guardian Tales (2020) – Phantom Thief Lucy
- Blue Archive (2021) – Iroha Natsume
- Fist of the North Star Legends ReVIVE (2021) – Sakura Kasugano
- Counter:Side (2021) – Watanabe Yuko(Lee Yoonjung)
- Honkai Impact 3rd (2021) – Li Sushang
- JoJo's Bizarre Adventure: All Star Battle R (2022) – Iggy
- Xenoblade Chronicles 3 (2022) – Miyabi
- Honkai: Star Rail (2023) – Sushang
- Pokémon Masters EX (2023) – Penny
- Metaphor: ReFantazio (2024) – Eupha
- Genshin Impact (2026) – Zibai
- Wuthering Waves (2026) – Suisui

=== Dubbing ===
==== Live-action ====
- The Dukes of Hazzard – Katie-Lynn Johnson
- Hawaii Five-0 – Kelly Donovon
- Howard the Duck - K.C.
- iCarly – Freddie Benson (episodes 1–25; replaced by Yusuke Tezuka)
- Never Said Goodbye – Xiao You (Zhou Dongyu)
- The Nutcracker in 3D – Mary
- Orphan Black – Sarah Manning
- Real – Song Yoo-hwa (Sulli)
- San Andreas – Ollie Taylor
- Stuck in the Suburbs – Kaylee Holland
- Trash – Rat (Gabriel Weinstein)

==== Animation ====
- Adventure Time – Bandit Princess
- Angelina Ballerina – Angelina Jeanette Mouseling
- Baby Looney Tunes – Baby Petunia
- Danger & Eggs – D.D. Danger
- Guess with Jess - Billie
- The Looney Tunes Show – Gossamer
- Meg and Mog – Mog
- Sonic Prime - Squad Commander Red
- Star Wars: Ewoks - Malani
