= Aikatsu Friends! season 2 =

Aikatsu Friends!
- Season 2
- No. of episodes: 26

Release
- Original network: TV Tokyo
- Original release: April 4 – September 26, 2019

Season chronology
- ← Previous; Season 1 Next → Aikatsu On Parade!

The following is a list of episodes for the second season of BN Pictures' Aikatsu Friends! television series, Aikatsu Friends! Brilliant Jewel, which aired on TV Tokyo from April 4, 2019, to September 26, 2019. The opening theme is Not Alone! (ひとりじゃない！, Hitori ja nai!) by Aine, Mio, Maika and Ema while the ending theme is "Be star" by Hibiki from Best Friends.

== Episode list ==
| No. | Season No. | Title | Original release date |
|---|---|---|---|
| 51 | 1 | "The Idol from Outer Space"; Transliteration: "Uchū Kara Kita Aidoru" (Japanese: 宇宙から来たアイドル) | April 4, 2019 |
One year after becoming Diamond Friends, Aine and Mio prepare to enter the Star Harmony Academy High School. But along with the responsibility of teaching the next generation of idols about Aikatsu, Aine and Mio begin a new journey in Aikatsu when they receive a distress call from a strange new idol named Hibiki Tenshou from space.
| 52 | 2 | "The Miraculous Gemstone"; Transliteration: "Kagayaki no Genseki" (Japanese: かがやきの原石) | April 11, 2019 |
Everyone is taken by surprise at Hibiki and her Jeweling Dress. In an effort to unlock the dress' secrets, Mio and the other girls ask Hibiki to show them Space Aikatsu.
| 53 | 3 | "Hibiki's Showtime!"; Transliteration: "Hibiki no Shōtaimu!" (Japanese: ひびきのショータイム！) | April 18, 2019 |
Hibiki wants to get to know the idols of Star Harmony Academy so her producers create a TV show for her to interview them. However Hibiki decides to make things more interesting by changing the interviews to a prank show.
| 54 | 4 | "Shining! My Color!"; Transliteration: "Kagayake! Atashi no Iro!" (Japanese: かがやけ！あたしの色！) | April 25, 2019 |
Aine is determined to keep up with Mio and earn her own jeweling dress. Having found an unrefined jewel, Aine gets the chance to make it shine when Mirai asks her if her protégé Wakaba can shadow her for the day. Unfortunately Aine lets thing go to her head and nearly loses the chance of earning her own jeweling dress.
| 55 | 5 | "Shuffle!? Friends!"; Transliteration: "Shaffuru!? Furenzu!" (Japanese: シャッフル！？フレンズ！) | May 2, 2019 |
With three jeweling dresses now in existence, the other idols begin wondering how to find their own unrefined jewels. HoneyCat and Reflect Moon both go searching for jewels and end up stumbling upon an old shrine. The shine is found to contain a magical stone which causes the idols to mix up their Friends pairs. Everything starts out great with the new pairs having new experiences, until the stone's power turns malevolent.
| 56 | 6 | "You too MyStar"; Transliteration: "Kimi datte My Star" (Japanese: 君だってMyStar) | May 9, 2019 |
Hibiki is still no closer to reforming I Believe with Alicia and is at a loss at what to do next. While confiding in Aine, Mio and Mirai, Karen suddenly appears and informs Hibiki she has spoken with Alicia. Karen reminds Hibiki that she has yet to meet Alicia in person and ask her to reform their Friends, but Hibiki is reluctant do to her fear of rejection. However Aine and Mio promise to inspire Hibiki to overcome her fear by overcoming their own fear of Love Me Tear.
| 57 | 7 | "GoGo☆Sorbett Kingdom"; Transliteration: "GoGo☆Sorubetto Ōkoku" (Japanese: GoGo☆ソルベット王国) | May 16, 2019 |
After being asked by Hibiki to accompany her to the Sorbett Kingdom, Aine and Mio begin preparations to leave Japan. This proves more problematic than normal when Aine reveals she has never left Japan before, nor does she have a passport.
| 58 | 8 | "Princess Alicia"; Transliteration: "Ōjo Arishia" (Japanese: 王女アリシア) | May 23, 2019 |
The girls finally arrive in the Sorbette Kingdom, but find they are banned from entering by the country's military on Alicia's orders. However Alicia's younger brother Charles comes to the rescue and allows them entry. Hibiki speaks with Alicia and attempts to convince her to reform I Believe but Alicia refuses. While wondering what to do next, Charles asks the idols about Aikatsu as no one in the kingdom has heard of it. Aine and Mio decide to hold a concert to introduce the people of the Sorbette Kingdom to Aikatsu.
| 59 | 9 | "The Secret Words are evol ustakiA!"; Transliteration: "Aikotoba wa kisuidatsukaia!" (Japanese: 合言葉はキスイダツカイア！) | May 30, 2019 |
After a blizzard buries Aine and Mio's snow stage, the girls get a surprise when Karen and Mirai show up to help. The idols notice some children watching them and ask if they would like to do Aikatsu, which the children agree to. However after Karen and Mirai confront Alicia, the children suddenly change their mind, not wanting to do Aikatsu anymore. So Mirai decides to play a game to cheer everyone up, no one can say Aikatsu until she says so. Instead everyone must say 'evol ustakiA'.
| 60 | 10 | "Aikatsu! Forbidden!?"; Transliteration: "Aikatsu! Kinshi-rei!?" (Japanese: アイカツ！禁止令!?) | June 6, 2019 |
Despite Alicia's resistance to Aikatsu, Aine and the others still perform their Aikatsu while staying in the Kingdom. This eventually leads to the people of Sorbette joining in. Alicia begins to question her feelings for Aikatsu when old memories begin to resurface. However this leads to the Captain of her Knights, Snowdan, to misinterpret her emotion as anguish toward Aikatsu. In order to protect Alicia's feelings, Snowdan bans Aikatsu in the Kingdom, making Hibiki determined to find a way to counter him and bring a smile back to Alicia's face.
| 61 | 11 | "Open the Door of Your Heart"; Transliteration: "Kokoro no tobira o akete" (Japanese: 心の扉をあけて) | June 13, 2019 |
Aine and Mio find out that they must return to Japan soon in order to continue their Brand Sponsorship. The two are downhearted they haven't been able to help Hibiki and Alicia yet. The citizens of the Sorbette Kingdom ask the idols to make Alicia to smile again before they leave. Hibiki believes that Alicia need only take to the stage and her love of Aikatsu will be rekindled. However, when Charles' pleas fail to sway his sister's mind, an incoming blizzard gives Mio an idea.
| 62 | 12 | "Friends Back Party"; Transliteration: "Tomodachi kaeru pāti" (Japanese: 友達かえるパーティ) | June 20, 2019 |
Honey Cat and Reflect Moon decide to hold a welcome back party for Aine and Mio. Unfortunately, Maika and Ema are unable to help with preparations due to their work schedule so Sakuya and Kaguya decide to handle it on their own. Luckily Mirai and Karen arrive home early and Mirai lends Wakaba to lend a hand. But things don't go as smoothly as the idols would like.
| 63 | 13 | "All roads lead to Aikatsu!"; Transliteration: "Subete no michi wa Aikatsu ni tsūzu!" (Japanese: すべての道はアイカツに通ず！) | June 27, 2019 |
Alicia wonders how to best get back into Aikatsu and asks Pure Palette if she can follow them round for a day. Alicia also realises she has nowhere to stay yet so Karen volunteers to have Alicia stay in her mansion. Between Pure Palette's Friend Energy and Karen's kindness Alicia begins to understand what she needs to do to move forward.
| 64 | 14 | "Honey Cat is a Galaxy☆"; Transliteration: "Hanī Kyatto wa gyarakushī☆" (Japanese: ハニーキャットはギャラクシー☆) | July 4, 2019 |
As HoneyCat's world tour comes to an end, Maika and Ema discuss what they should do next.
| 65 | 15 | "Heart-Pounding Friends Date"; Transliteration: "Dokidoki Furenzudēto" (Japanese: ドキドキ フレンズデート) | July 11, 2019 |
Aine and Mio ask Hibiki when she and Alicia will start doing Aikatsu together as I Believe. However, Hibiki reveals she hasn't had a chance to speak with Alicia since returning to Japan. Aine has an idea and tells Hibiki to ask Alicia on a Friends date.
| 66 | 16 | "Wakaba, I'll Do It All!"; Transliteration: "Wakaba, maru tto yatchau zo!" (Japanese: わかば、まるっとやっちゃうぞ！) | July 18, 2019 |
Star Harmony Academy is holding an open day event for people to come and see the school and how the idols train. Mirai offers to have Wakaba lend a hand as she feels her protege is still lacking something essential for becoming an idol. Wakaba manages to help out fine until an old friend of hers appears at the school, causing Wakaba to become distressed.
| 67 | 17 | "From Mirai, to the Future"; Transliteration: "Mirai kara, mirai e" (Japanese: ミライから、未来へ) | July 25, 2019 |
Wakaba comes to realise what she has been missing as an idol. Having seen how much she has grown, Mirai decides it's time for Wakaba to stand on her own and make her debut. But as the day she has been waiting for approaches, Wakaba seems troubled and reluctant make her debut.
| 68 | 18 | "Whoosh Whoosh! Fierce on Karen Island!"; Transliteration: "Byunbyun! Gekisō Karen-jima!" (Japanese: ビュンビュン！激走カレン島！) | August 1, 2019 |
Alicia receives some shocking news from her brother back home. The harsh winter climate of the Sorbette Kingdom is intensifying and threatening to take away the citizen's smiles again. Alicia recalls a legend from the kingdom about a festival involving the jewels that could create a miracle. Aine and Mio realise that they could recreate the festival in the legend using their Jeweling Dresses. Alicia asks everyone to help and Karen and Mirai recommend Pure Palette to produce the festival. However Tamaki is apprehensive about letting Aine and Mio go through with it since they have a lot of work to do, such as the up coming Aikatsu! Go Kart Grand Prix. Aine and Mio tell Tamaki that if they win the Grand Prix, that will prove they are more than up to the challenge of producing the festival and to allow them to do it.
| 69 | 19 | "Everyone is Seakatsu!"; Transliteration: "Min'na de Umikatsu!" (Japanese: みんなでウミカツ！) | August 8, 2019 |
The idols are given a well-deserved break from work and spend the day at the beach.
| 70 | 20 | "To the New Stage"; Transliteration: "Aratanaru Sutēji e" (Japanese: 新たなるステージへ) | August 15, 2019 |
Alicia feels reluctant to reform I Believe with Hibiki, feeling she is far behind Hibiki in her Aikatsu having spent the past five years on hiatus. As Alicia struggles to catch up, Hibiki offers to assist her.
| 71 | 21 | "Sakuya's Thoughts, Kaguya's Wishes"; Transliteration: "Sakuya no omoi, Kaguya no negai" (Japanese: さくやの思い、かぐやの願い) | August 22, 2019 |
Kaguya has been offering advice to younger students, feeling it her duty to help nurture the next generation of idols. When Kaguya see an advertisement for Karen's Idol school in New York City, she believes it as an opportunity to expand and growth in order to be a better mentor. But studying abroad means being apart from Sakuya for the first time in her life, and she wonders if Sakuya can take care of herself in her sister's absence. Things get more complicated when the twins discover that their manager Hariu appears to be romantically involved with Tamaki.
| 72 | 22 | "LOVE ME TEAR"; Transliteration: "Rabu Mī Tia" (Japanese: ラブ ミー ティア) | August 29, 2019 |
As the day of the Jeweling Festival draws closer, Aine and Mio begin to officially invite the participating idols. However when asking Karen and Mirai about their invite, they say that unfortunately their work schedules are making it difficult to fit other things in. Aine and Mio begin to wonder not just if Love Me Tear will participate in the Jeweling Festival, but will their year apart impact Karen and Mirai's abilities on stage?
| 73 | 23 | "The Night Before the Jeweling Festival"; Transliteration: "Jueringu Fesutibaru Zen'yasai" (Japanese: ジュエリングフェスティバル前夜祭) | September 5, 2019 |
Everyone arrives in the Sorbett Kingdom and prepare for the Jeweling Festival. The stage is set but what's missing is the audience. It seems that the cold weather in the Kingdom has intensified making it extremely cold, even indoors. With the citizens of Sorbett unwilling to leave their homes, the idols must figure a way of warming everyone up.
| 74 | 24 | "A Stage Beyond Time"; Transliteration: "Toki wo koeta Sutēji" (Japanese: 時を超えたステージ) | September 12, 2019 |
On the night before the Jeweling Festival, Charles comes to find Aine and Mio as he has discovered his sister and Hibiki have gone missing, as have Mirai and Karen. Aine and Mio tell him not to worry as the four idols have gone off to spend time with each other, and help each other overcome their biggest weaknesses in order to be on top form for the Jeweling Festival.
| 75 | 25 | "I'm Not Alone!"; Transliteration: "Hitori Janai!" (Japanese: ひとりじゃない！) | September 19, 2019 |
The Jeweling Festival is well underway with only Pure Palette left to perform. However the cold weather intensifies causing everyone to take shelter in doors. With the blizzard set to continue, Aine and Mio feel they have no choice but to cancel the performance. But luckily the other idols step in to help find a solution.
| 76 | 26 | "Everyone Everyone Friends!"; Transliteration: "Min'na Min'na Furenzu!" (Japanese: みんなみんな フレンズ！) | September 26, 2019 |
With the Jeweling Festival a success, everyone returns to Japan. Karen has a celebration sleepover and Wakaba notices all the souvenirs she brought back from Sorbett. HoneyCat mention they saw Hariu buying a ring leading to Reflect Moon revealing Hariu and Tamaki's relationship. However it appears Tamaki is reluctant to commit to the proposal because of her work, so the idols decide to come up with a plan to get Tamaki to accept.
