= Dance Dance Danseur =

Japanese manga series

- First tankōbon volume cover

ダンス・ダンス・ダンスール (Dansu Dansu Dansūru)
- Genre: Coming-of-age; Drama; Romance
- Manga
- Written by: George Asakura
- Published by: Shogakukan
- Magazine: Weekly Big Comic Spirits
- Original run: September 14, 2015 – present
- Volumes: 33
- Anime television series
- Directed by: Munehisa Sakai
- Produced by: Hiroshi Kamei; Akihiko Okada; Yuuta Uchiyama
- Written by: Yoshimi Narita
- Music by: Michiru
- Studio: MAPPA
- Licensed by: Crunchyroll (streaming); SEA: Medialink
- Original network: JNN (MBS, TBS)
- Original run: April 9, 2022 – June 18, 2022
- Episodes: 11
- icon

Dance Dance Danseur (Japanese: ダンス・ダンス・ダンスール, Hepburn: Dansu Dansu Dansūru) is a Japanese manga series written and illustrated by George Asakura. It has been serialized in Shogakukan's seinen manga magazine Weekly Big Comic Spirits since September 2015. An anime television series adaptation produced by MAPPA aired from April to June 2022 on the Super Animeism programming block.

== Synopsis ==
Junpei Murao used to not like ballet, but after seeing a man perform it, he suddenly finds himself fascinated by the art. His father dies in a tragic accident and Junpei gives up ballet to be "masculine". However one day, a new transfer student named Miyako Godai arrives who brings about his love for ballet once again.

== Characters ==
Junpei Murao (村尾 潤平, Murao Junpei)
Voiced by: Daiki Yamashita
A 14 year old boy who took a liking to ballet when he was younger. He cut his aspirations short after his father, a stunt performer, died. Due to being the only male in his house, he took his uncle's advise to become more "masculine" to be a pillar of support to his family and quit ballet, instead practicing Jeet Kune Do under his tutelage. Upon his encounter with Miyako, Junpei's passion for ballet is reignited and begins to rediscover himself and his meaning of masculinity after seeing Ruō dance. Although a talented dancer, Junpei struggles in learning ballet due to lacking the fundamentals of the art as he lacked continuous training and tends to prioritize his own emotions over proper technique. However, he is noted by many to have prodigious characteristics and an ideal body for ballet. Through multiple tribulations, he comes to grasp the essence of ballet while humbling himself in the process, growing more mature as a person and dancer.
Ruō Mori (森 流鶯, Mori Ruō)
Voiced by: Koki Uchiyama
A shy 14-year-old boy, he is Miyako's cousin. The son of an american idol, he was abandoned by his mother following a scandal that exposed him as the son of her mother with another man who was not her husband. Raised by her strict, ballet obsessed grandmother, Ruō grew under a physically and emotionally abusive environment with little to no contact with the outside world, learning only ballet. As a result, Ruō has weak social skills, but his dancing prowess is unparalleled. Despite his tremendous skill, Ruō's social reclusion weakens his ability to learn and express himself properly. Ruō is in love with Miyako and sees Junpei as a nuisance, but it is through their adventures, that he is able to break out of his shell and grow more as a person.
Miyako Godai (五代 都, Godai Miyako)
Voiced by: Kaede Hondo
Ruō's cousin. A 14 year old girl and the daughter of Chizuru. Miyako has learned ballet from her mother since an early age. Although skilled, Miyako's personality is deemed unsuitable by her mother to perform in large roles. Miyako discovers Junpei's ability and realizes he has skill for ballet which causes him to reignite his passion for the dance. A kind and polite girl, Miyako has conflicted feelings about Junpei and Ruō, both of whom she cares for. She worries for Ruō in particular, being aware of his circumstances.
Misaki Yasuda (安田 海咲, Yasuda Misaki)
Voiced by: Kōhei Amasaki
Yamato Takura (田倉 大和, Takura Yamato)
Voiced by: Koutaro Nishiyama
Natsuki Oikawa (生川 夏姫, Oikawa Natsuki)
Voiced by: Misato Fukuen
A sixth-grade girl, and the daughter of Ayako. Natuski is a very talented dancer whose skill is leagues above her peers, but is generally too serious and her expressions are inadequate. Proud and perfectionist, Natsuki puts tremendous effort in ballet, striving to be the best. The two have many in common in terms of how they view ballet and have been able to dance in perfect sync. Natsuki in fact feels attracted to Junpei as a dancer, as his expressive dancing matches her own views. There are hints of mutual romantic feelings between the two.
Kotobuki Himenokōji (姫乃小路 寿, Himenokōji Kotobuki)
Voiced by: Jun Inoue

== Media ==
=== Manga ===
Written and illustrated by George Asakura, Dance Dance Danseur started in Shogakukan's seinen manga magazine Weekly Big Comic Spirits on September 14, 2015. The series went on hiatus in May 2024 because Asakura had to undergo a surgery, and resumed in September of the same year. Shogakukan has collected its chapters into individual tankōbon volumes. The first volume was released on February 12, 2016. As of September 11, 2026, thirty-three volumes have been released.

==== Volumes ====
No.	Japanese release date	Japanese ISBN
1	February 12, 2016	978-4-09-187449-8
2	May 12, 2016	978-4-09-187607-2
3	September 12, 2016	978-4-09-187775-8
4	December 12, 2016	978-4-09-189331-4
5	April 12, 2017	978-4-09-189435-9
6	July 12, 2017	978-4-09-189632-2
7	October 12, 2017	978-4-09-189658-2
8	January 12, 2018	978-4-09-189777-0
9	April 12, 2018	978-4-09-189855-5
10	August 9, 2018	978-4-09-860002-1
11	November 12, 2018	978-4-09-860182-0
12	February 12, 2019	978-4-09-860216-2
13	May 10, 2019	978-4-09-860281-0
14	August 9, 2019	978-4-09-860377-0
15	December 12, 2019	978-4-09-860458-6
16	March 12, 2020	978-4-09-860561-3
17	June 11, 2020	978-4-09-860631-3
18	October 12, 2020	978-4-09-860748-8
19	January 12, 2021	978-4-09-860805-8
20	April 12, 2021	978-4-09-861076-1
21	September 10, 2021	978-4-09-861121-8
22	December 28, 2021	978-4-09-861207-9
23	March 30, 2022	978-4-09-861261-1
24	August 30, 2022	978-4-09-861395-3
25	April 12, 2023	978-4-09-861500-1
26	August 9, 2023	978-4-09-862539-0
27	December 12, 2023	978-4-09-862615-1
28	April 11, 2024	978-4-09-862688-5
29	November 12, 2024	978-4-09-863028-8
30	May 12, 2025	978-4-09-863416-3
31	November 12, 2025	978-4-09-863640-2
32	April 10, 2026	978-4-09-863871-0
33	September 11, 2026	978-4-09-864140-6

=== Anime ===
In April 2021, it was announced that Dance Dance Danseur would receive an anime television series adaptation. The series is produced by MAPPA and directed by Munehisa Sakai, with Yoshimi Narita writing the series' scripts, Hitomi Hasegawa designing the characters, and Michiru composing the music. It aired from April 9 to June 18, 2022, on the Super Animeism block on MBS, TBS and their affiliates. (Note: MBS lists the series premiere at 25:25 on April 8, 2022, which is effectively 1:25 a.m. JST on April 9.) The opening theme song is "Narihibiku Kagiri" (鳴り響く限り; lit. 'As Long As It Echoes'), performed by Yuki, while the ending theme song is "Kaze, Hana" (風、花; lit. 'Wind, Flowers'), performed by Hitorie.

Disney+ acquired exclusive streaming rights to the series under Star in Japan. Crunchyroll streamed the series outside of Asia. Medialink licensed the series in Southeast Asia and streamed it on Disney+.

==== Episodes ====
No.	Title	Directed by	Written by	Storyboarded by	Original release date
1	"There's No Way I'm Doing That Ballet Thing!"; Transliteration: "Yaru Wake nē Daro, Barē Nante!" (Japanese: やるわけねーだろ、バレエなんて！)	Hisatoshi Shimizu	Yoshimi Narita	Hisatoshi Shimizu; Munehisa Sakai (Note: Ballet Part Storyboard (バレエパート絵コンテ))	April 9, 2022 (Note: This episode was pre-screened on April 2, 2022.)
2	"I Can't Be Friends With Someone Like Him!"; Transliteration: "Kore wa...... Tomodachi ni Narenai Taipu da!" (Japanese: これはっ……友達になれないタイプだっ！)	Yūji Tokuno; Hajime Ootani (Note: Ballet Part Director (バレエパート演出))	Yoshimi Narita	Hajime Ootani	April 16, 2022 (Note: This episode aired at 1:40 a.m. JST, 15 minutes after the original air time on MBS/TBS.)
3	"What Does It Mean to Be Manly?"; Transliteration: "Otokorashiitte, Nanda?" (Japanese: 男らしいって、なんだ？)	Kōki Aoshima; Hajime Ootani	Yoshimi Narita	Kōki Aoshima; Munehisa Sakai	April 23, 2022
4	"I Can Do Ballet Now"; Transliteration: "Ore, Mō Barē Odotte Iin da, ze" (Japanese: 俺、もうバレエ踊っていいんだッ、ぜっ)	Shinji Satō; Munehisa Sakai	Yoshimi Narita	Masako Satō	April 30, 2022
5	"I Can't Die Now"; Transliteration: "Shine, nē Daro" (Japanese: 死ね、ねーだろっ)	Hajime Ootani	Misaki Morie	Hajime Ootani	May 7, 2022
6	"Why Am I Doing Ballet?"; Transliteration: "Ore, Nande Barē Yatten da?" (Japanese: 俺、なんでバレエやってんだ？)	Hiromi Nishiyama	Erika Andō	Shinji Satō	May 14, 2022
7	"Ah, I'm So Embarrassed"; Transliteration: "Hī, Mō, Hazu" (Japanese: ひぃ〜、もうっ、恥っ)	Yūji Tokuno	Misaki Morie	Yūji Tokuno; Munehisa Sakai	May 21, 2022
8	"Oh, I Wanna Do It Again!!"; Transliteration: "Ā Mokkai Yaritē!!" (Japanese: あ―もっかいやりてぇーっ！！)	Takeru Satō; Munehisa Sakai	Erika Andō	Masako Satō	May 28, 2022
9	"I Wanna Get Better, Too!"; Transliteration: "Ore Datte, Motto Umaku Naritēn da yo!" (Japanese: 俺だって、もっと上手くなりてぇんだよっ！)	Yasutomo Okamoto	Misaki Morie	Yasutomo Okamoto	June 4, 2022
10	"Miyako... You Need to Be by His Side"; Transliteration: "Miyako wa, Aitsu no Soba ni......Ite Yannakya" (Japanese: 都は、あいつの側に……いてやんなきゃ)	Hisatoshi Shimizu; Hajime Ootani	Yoshimi Narita	Kagetsu Aizawa; Hajime Ootani	June 11, 2022
11	"Oh, I Think I Love Classical Ballet"; Transliteration: "A, Ore, Kurashikku Barē, Suki ka mo" (Japanese: あ、俺、クラシックバレエ、好きかも)	Munehisa Sakai; Hajime Ootani	Yoshimi Narita	Munehisa Sakai; Hajime Ootani; Takeru Satō	June 18, 2022

== Reception ==
Dance Dance Danseur was one of the Jury Recommended Works at the 23rd Japan Media Arts Festival in 2020.
