= Miyuki Hoshizora =

- Pretty Cure character
- Miyuki Hoshizora (left) and her Cure form, Cure Happy (right).
- First appearance: Smile PreCure! (episode 1; 2012)
- Created by: Toei Animation
- Designed by: Toshie Kawamura
- Voiced by: Misato Fukuen; Laura Bailey (English dub)

In-universe information
- Aliases: Cure Happy; Emily (English dub); Glitter Lucky (English dub)
- Species: Human
- Gender: Female
- Occupation: Middle school student Pretty Cure
- Relatives: Hiroshi Hoshizora (father); Ikuyo Hoshizora (mother); Tae Hoshizora (grandmother)
- Nationality: Japanese

Miyuki Hoshizora (Japanese: 星空 みゆき, Hepburn: Hoshizora Miyuki) is the protagonist of the 2012 anime series Smile PreCure!. She is a second-year transfer -year student to Nanairogaoka Middle School who loves fairy tales. At the beginning of the series, she meets Candy, a fairy from the magical realm of Märchenland, and gains the power to transform into Cure Happy (キュアハッピー, Kyua Happi). Her last name, Hoshizora, means "starry sky", which ties into her light-based powers, while her first name, Miyuki, means "happiness".

Because of Smile PreCure!'s wide worldwide release and subsequent popularity, Miyuki is one of the most well-known Cures in the franchise. Her cheerful, outgoing, but slightly childish attitude has also been seen in the Cures that followed her, such as Haruka Haruno/Cure Flora of Go! Princess PreCure and Mirai Asahina/Cure Miracle of Witchy Pretty Cure!.

== Characterization ==
Miyuki is a fourteen-year-old girl with light skin, dark magenta hair, and magenta eyes. She is a little under five feet tall. She usually wears Nanairogaoka Middle School's female school uniform, which consists of a white blazer with puffy sleeves, a blue skirt, a pink tie, white socks with blue stripes, and black loafers. When she's not in school, her casual clothing consists of her wearing a long-sleeved pink shirt, a pink skirt, a fuchsia hooded vest, white socks, and pink sneakers.

Miyuki is characterized by her cheerful and innocent attitude, as she strives to be happy and have a positive outlook no matter what. She showcases a strong passion for fairytales and folklore. However, she is not very studious and is often late to school. Her catchphrase is "Ultra Happy!" (ウルトラハッピー !), Urutora Happī!). Despite occasionally displaying to have a sensitive and vulnerable side, Miyuki is an immensely friendly and kind young girl with a very strong sense of empathy. She often leaves a very positive influence on those around her and she gradually develops to be a bold and courageous leader of her team. Miyuki is very expressive and open about her feelings, which is a stark contrast to the type of person she was prior to the series, where she was more reserved, closed off, and isolated.

Miyuki's Smile Pact, an item she receives from Candy, grants her Pretty Cure powers. As Cure Happy, she has hot pink hair worn in long pigtails. She wears a white tiara with feather accessories, a pink dress with a magenta bow on the front and white ruffles on the sleeves, white cuffs with pink bands, magenta shorts, and white boots with pink accents and heels. As the head, Cure Happy has the most special powers amongst her team. They are based on light and sparkles, most prominently with her finisher, the Happy Shower. She also has immaculate jumping abilities and displayed some miraculous and holy powers. Cure Happy even has a vast variety of transformations.

== English dub ==
In the English dub of Smile PreCure!, which is titled Glitter Force, Miyuki is voiced by Laura Bailey. She is renamed Emily and Cure Happy is renamed Glitter Lucky, and Happy Shower is renamed to Sparkle Storm.

== Appearances ==
=== TV series ===
Miyuki debuts in ninth installment of the Pretty Cure franchise, Smile Pretty Cure!, as an optimistic but awkward girl who was nearly late for school until she bumped into a fairy named Candy. She eventually became one of the legendary warriors known as the Pretty Cure to fight against the forces of the Bad End Kingdom with the friends she makes on the way.

=== Movie ===
Miyuki appears in the season's tie-in movie, Smile Pretty Cure! The Movie: Big Mismatch in a Picture Book! (映画 スマイルプリキュア！ 絵本の中はみんなチグハグ！) where she and her friends are pulled into a magical fairytale world and interacting with its stories. The film serves as an extension of her origins in her love for folktales and her ties with a girl named Nico.

=== Light novel ===
Miyuki also appeared in a light novel that serves as a continuation of story after Smile Pretty Cure. The novel takes place 10 years after Miyuki and her friends defeated Pierrot and continue to live their lives, now as young adults. Miyuki works in a bookstore, bonding with a girl named Yoshimi.

=== Other appearances ===
Cure Happy made cameos in HappinessCharge PreCure! and Soaring Sky! Pretty Cure to celebrate the franchise's 10th and 20th anniversary. In Hug! Pretty Cure, Miyuki is summoned into the Cures' town and battles Doctor Traum along with all the other Cures in the franchise up to that point. She also appeared in a multitude of Pretty Cure All Stars movies, debuting in Pretty Cure All Stars New Stage: Friends of the Future (プリキュアオールスターズ New Stage みらいのともだち).

== Filmography ==
- Smile PreCure! (2012–2013) - Main protagonist
- HappinessCharge PreCure! (2014–2015) - Guest appearance
- Hug! Pretty Cure (2018–2019) - Guest appearance
- Soaring Sky! Pretty Cure (2023–2024) - Guest appearance

== Reception ==
Miyuki has proven to be a popular character and very well-received, being frequently praised for her ability to persevere despite the predicament. During 2012, Cure Happy ranks third in the Pretty Cure General Election 2012 poll held in Biglobe's Anime One's site. In Bibi's Popularity Ranking of the Pretty Cure, Cure Happy was ranked first. In a 2019 survey conducted by the NHK, Miyuki was ranked the twenty-first most popular Pretty Cure through 613,524 votes. In a 2020 poll held in Goo Ranking for anime heroines, Miyuki was voted in second place.
