= Hug! Pretty Cure Futari wa Pretty Cure: All Stars Memories =

2018 film by Hiroshi Miyamoto

- Theatrical release poster
- Japanese: 映画 HUGっと!プリキュア♡ふたりはプリキュア オールスターズメモリーズ
- Revised Hepburn: Eiga Hagutto! Purikyua ♡ Futari wa Purikyua Ōru Sutāzu Memorīzu
- Directed by: Hiroshi Miyamoto
- Screenplay by: Junko Kōmura
- Based on: Pretty Cure by Izumi Todo
- Produced by: Yū Kaminoki
- Starring: Rie Hikisaka; Rina Honnizumi; Yui Ogura; Nao Tamura; Yukari Tamura; Konomi Tada; Junko Noda; Yōko Honna; Yukana; Mamoru Miyano
- Cinematography: Keiko Ishizuka; Kenji Takahashi
- Music by: Yuki Hayashi
- Production company: Toei Animation
- Distributed by: Toei Company, Ltd.
- Release date: October 27, 2018
- Running time: 73 minutes
- Country: Japan
- Language: Japanese

Hug! Pretty Cure Futari wa Pretty Cure: All Stars Memories (Note: Japanese: 映画 HUGっと!プリキュア♡ふたりはプリキュア オールスターズメモリーズ, Hepburn: Eiga Hagutto! Purikyua♡Futari wa Purikyua Ōru Sutāzu Memorīzu; lit. "With a Hug! Pretty Cure♡We Are Pretty Cure the Movie: All Stars Memories") is a 2018 Japanese animated action fantasy film based on the Pretty Cure franchise created by Izumi Todo, and its first and fifteenth series, Pretty Cure and Hug! Pretty Cure. The film is directed by Hiroshi Miyamoto, written by Junko Kōmura, and produced by Toei Animation. The film was released in Japan on October 27, 2018.

All Stars Memories is the eleventh entry in the Pretty Cure All Stars crossover film series and celebrates the franchise's 15th anniversary. The Hug! Pretty Cure team joins forces with the Pretty Cure team to retrieve the Pretty Cures' stolen powers and memories from a vengeful teru teru bōzu named Miden.

The film topped Japanese box office records in its theatrical run and currently holds the Guinness World Record for "Most Magical Warriors in an Anime Film", with a total of 55 Pretty Cures across thirteen generations.

== Plot ==
The Pretty Cure Max Heart team: Cures Black, White and Shiny Luminous fights a mysterious monster who is attacking Minato Mirai 21 and defeat it using Extreme Luminario. They then rescue a reporter who had become trapped on a Ferris wheel, but then a teru teru bōzu named Miden appears before them. Later, the Hug! Pretty Cure team: Hana, Saaya, Homare, Emiru, and Ruru are having a picnic when Miden appears before them. They transform and fight him, but notice that he is using the attacks of other Pretty Cures. Miden attacks Yell with a mysterious beam, and Ange, Etoile, Macherie, and Amour shield her from the attack but are turned into babies in the process. The Max Heart team arrives to protect Yell and the kids, but Miden disappears after turning White into a baby. Nagisa explains to Hana that Miden has turned the other Pretty Cures into toddlers and stolen their memories.

After finding their baby teammates, who had run off, Miden appears before Hana and Nagisa. After Nagisa demands he give Honoka's memory back, he furiously attacks both girls, which causes Honoka to revert back to normal. They transform and fight Miden, with Hana assisting them; while cheering for Yell, the rest of the Hug! team reverts back to normal. Miden takes the towns' memories and leads the Cures to his lair.

After exploring his lair, the Cures learn that Miden was a camera called the Miden F Mark II. Its manufacturer went bankrupt, and as a result it never had any photos taken. After gaining sentience, Miden decided he wanted to have his own memories and began stealing memories from others. Yell notices his pain and loneliness, as everyone he knew had forgotten about him. After Harry and Hugtan use the Miracle Light's power to restore the rest of the Pretty Cure to normal, they help to fight off Miden's shadows while Yell heads to Miden. She comforts Miden and assures him that they'll make new memories together. The Pretty Cures, with the power of the Miracle Lights, heal him as he smiles and fades away. Later, Hana takes pictures of everyone at the picnic with a fixed Miden camera.

== Voice cast ==
Hug! Pretty Cure cast

- Rie Hikisaka as Hana Nono/Cure Yell
- Rina Honnizumi as Saaya Yakushiji/Cure Ange
- Yui Ogura as Homare Kagayaki/Cure Etoile
- Nao Tamura as Emiru Aisaki/Cure Macherie
- Yukari Tamura as Ruru Amour/Cure Amour
- Konomi Tada as Hugtan
- Junko Noda as Hariham Harry
  - Jun Fukushima as Hariham's human form

Pretty Cure Max Heart cast

- Yōko Honna as Nagisa Misumi/Cure Black
- Yukana as Honoka Yukishiro/Cure White
- Rie Tanaka as Hikari Kujo/Shiny Luminous
- Tomokazu Seki as Mepple
- Akiko Yajima as Mipple

PreCure Splash Star cast

- Orie Kimoto as Saki Hyuuga/Cure Bloom/Cure Bright
- Atsuko Enomoto as Mai Mishou/Cure Egret/Cure Windy

Yes! PreCure 5 GoGo! cast

- Yūko Sanpei as Nozomi Yumehara/Cure Dream
- Junko Takeuchi as Rin Natsuki/Cure Rouge
- Mariya Ise as Urara Kasugano/Cure Lemonade
- Ai Nagano as Komachi Akimoto/Cure Mint
- Ai Maeda as Karen Minazuki/Cure Aqua
- Eri Sendai as Milk/Kurumi Mimino/Milky Rose

Fresh Pretty Cure! cast

- Kanae Oki as Love Momozono/Cure Peach
- Eri Kitamura as Miki Aono/Cure Berry
- Akiko Nakagawa as Inori Yamabuki/Cure Pine
- Yuka Komatsu as Setsuna Higashi/Cure Passion

HeartCatch PreCure! cast

- Nana Mizuki as Tsubomi Hanasaki/Cure Blossom
- Fumie Mizusawa as Erika Kurumi/Cure Marine
- Houko Kuwashima as Itsuki Myoudouin/Cure Sunshine
- Aya Hisakawa as Yuri Tsukikage/Cure Moonlight

Suite PreCure cast

- Ami Koshimizu as Hibiki Hojo/Cure Melody
- Fumiko Orikasa as Kanade Minamino/Cure Rhythm
- Megumi Toyoguchi as Siren/Ellen Kurokawa/Cure Beat
- Rumi Okubo as Ako Shirabe/Cure Muse

Smile PreCure! cast

- Misato Fukuen as Miyuki Hoshizora/Cure Happy
- Asami Tano as Akane Hino/Cure Sunny
- Hisako Kanemoto as Yayoi Kise/Cure Peace
- Marina Inoue as Nao Midorikawa/Cure March
- Chinami Nishimura as Reika Aoki/Cure Beauty

DokiDoki! PreCure cast

- Hitomi Nabatame as Mana Aida/Cure Heart
- Minako Kotobuki as Rikka Hishikawa/Cure Diamond
- Mai Fuchigami as Alice Yotsuba/Cure Rosetta
- Kanako Miyamoto as Makoto Kenzaki/Cure Sword
- Rie Kugimiya as Aguri Madoka/Cure Ace

HappinessCharge PreCure! cast

- Megumi Nakajima as Megumi Aino/Cure Lovely
- Megumi Han as Hime Shirayuki/Cure Princess
- Rina Kitagawa as Yūko Omori/Cure Honey
- Haruka Tomatsu as Iona Hikawa/Cure Fortune

Go! Princess PreCure cast

- Yū Shimamura as Haruka Haruno/Cure Flora
- Masumi Asano as Minami Kaido/Cure Mermaid
- Hibiku Yamamura as Kirara Amanogawa/Cure Twinkle
- Miyuki Sawashiro as Towa Akagi/Cure Scarlet

Witchy PreCure! cast

- Rie Takahashi as Mirai Asahina/Cure Miracle
- Yui Horie as Riko Izayoi/Cure Magical
- Saori Hayami as Kotoha Hanami/Cure Felice
- Ayaka Saitō as Mofurun

Kirakira Pretty Cure a la Mode cast

- Karen Miyama as Ichika Usami/Cure Whip
- Haruka Fukuhara as Himari Arisugawa/Cure Custard
- Tomo Muranaka as Aoi Tategami/Cure Gelato
- Saki Fujita as Yukari Kotozume/Cure Macaron
- Nanako Mori as Akira Tenjō/Cure Chocolat
- Inori Minase as Kirarin/Ciel Kirahoshi/Cure Parfait

Film characters

- Mamoru Miyano as Miden, a white teru teru bozu-like monster that steals the Pretty Cures' memories and powers and turns them into infants. It can also create offshoots that swarm like locusts. Miyano stated he was excited to have the 55 Cures gather together in a single movie.
- Mizuki Yamamoto as herself; in the film, she is a reporter who falls in the crossroads of the battle between a monster and the Pretty Cures. Yamamoto, an anime enthusiast and a big Pretty Cure fan, said, "I was really happy when I was talking and I was really impressed when I talked to the Pretty Cure that I had longed for."
- Tasuku Kida as a mysterious monster who attacks Minato Mirai 21 in the beginning of the film.

== Production ==
In March 2018, it was announced that there a film featuring the first Pretty Cure series was in the works, with its title announced on June 17 of the same year. The 15th anniversary film of the Pretty Cure franchise, it would be a crossover between the current series Hug! Pretty Cure and the inaugural series Pretty Cure, and would mark the first time since 2016 where all the Pretty Cures appear at once.

Similar to Pretty Cure Dream Stars!, which was also directed by Hiroshi Miyamoto, the film combines cel animation and computer-generated animation. The Pretty Cure dialogue was recorded twice, and the CGI sequence started in January 2018, ahead of Hug! Pretty Cure's premiere. Production of the cel animation started in August 2018.

The Miracle Light for the movie is the Miracle Memories Light (ミラクル♡メモリーズライト, Mirakuru♡Memorīzu Raito), and the first 200,000 children received the Mirai Crystal~Cure Yell and Cure Black~ (ミライクリスタル〜キュアエール&キュアブラック〜, Mirai Kurisutaru〜Kyua Ēru & Kyua Burakku〜) as a present.

There were several tie-ins with Yokohama City. A Pretty Cure special stage dance involving the Kanto Gakuin University cheerleading dance team Fits was held at Minato Mirai Smart Festival 2018. A fifteenth anniversary exhibition was held at Yokohama Landmark Tower for eight days, and Mizuki Yamamoto, who appeared in the film as the reporter, hosted a women-only space called "PRECURE GIRLS 'NIGHT" on September 21. On October 21, the week before the film's release, a premiere screening was held at Yokohama Burg 13, and the costumes of the 55 Pretty Cure appeared at Grand Mall Park. In addition, various places in Yokohama City are included in the film, such as Minato Mirai 21 appearing in the first scene.

=== Music ===
Yuki Hayashi, who have previously composed Kirakira Pretty Cure a la Mode and Hug! Pretty Cure series, as well as Pretty Cure Dream Stars!, Kirakira Pretty Cure a la Mode the Movie: Crisply! The Memory of Mille-feuille! and Pretty Cure Super Stars! films, composed the music for the film. "DANZEN! Pretty Cure-The One and Only Twin Lights~" (DANZEN!ふたりはプリキュア〜唯一無二の光たち〜, DANZEN! Futari wa Purikyua 〜Yuiitsumuni no Hikaritachi〜) is the insert song of the film, sung by Mayumi Gojo. it is paired with "Rewind Memory" (リワインドメモリー, Riwaindo Memorī), sung by Gojo and Kanako Miyamoto. The single, released on October 24, 2018, topped at #35 in the Oricon Singles Chart on November 5, 2018. The soundtrack was released on October 24, 2018, and topped #124 in the Oricon Albums Chart on November 5, 2018.

== Reception ==
=== Box office ===
The film earned 357 million yen during the first two days of release (October 27 and 28). This made it the third Pretty Cure film in a row to rank first place. Pia gave the film a first place ranking at 92.4. Toei described it as "the biggest hit start of Spring and Autumn compared to the 24 films so far".

With a revenue of 1.15 billion yen, All Stars Memories is the highest-grossing Pretty Cure film since Pretty Cure All Stars DX2: Light of Hope - Protect the Rainbow Jewel!.

=== Accolades ===
With 55 Pretty Cures in the movie, Guinness World Records approved the movie for the world record of "Most Magical Warriors in An Anime Film" on 27 October 2018. The film also won the Best 3D in an Anime award at the 2018 CGWorld Awards and the Best Film award at the 2019 VFX Japan Awards.
