= Danzen! Futari wa Pretty Cure =

First Pretty Cure opening song

- Album cover of 2011 rerelease

Single by Mayumi Gojo
- B-side: "Get You Love Love?!" (2011 re-release) "Rewind Memory" (2018 remix)
- Released: 24 March 2004
- Genre: J-pop
- Label: Marvelous Entertainment

Mayumi Gojo singles chronology
"Danzen! Futari wa Pretty Cure" (2004)	""Danzen! Futari wa Pretty Cure (Ver. Max Heart)"" (2005)

"Danzen! Futari wa Pretty Cure" (Japanese: Danzen! ふたりはプリキュア, Hepburn: Danzen! Futari wa Purikyua; lit. "Danzen! We Are Pretty Cure") is the opening theme song of Pretty Cure, the inaugural installment of the Pretty Cure magical girl franchise. Sung by Mayumi Gojo, two remixes of the song were later released.

== Original version ==
The original version of "Danzen! Futari wa Pretty Cure", performed by Gojo, was the opening theme of Futari wa Pretty Cure; it was released as a single on 24 March 2004 by Marvelous Entertainment. Marvelous AQL re-released "Danzen! Futari wa Pretty Cure" on 11 May 2011, as a CD single that also included the show's ending "Get You! Love Love?!" (ゲッチュウ！らぶらぶぅ？！) as well as karaoke versions of both songs. That same day, the label released another version of the single that featured a DVD that contains creditless versions of the opening and both endings of the series. The re-release charted at #160 in the Oricon Singles Chart on 23 May 2011.

== Other versions ==
=== "Danzen! Futari wa Pretty Cure (Ver. Max Heart)" ===
A remix of the original song, with added instrumentals and again sung by Mayumi Gojo, was made for the series' sequel Futari wa Pretty Cure Max Heart; it was released as a single by Marvelous Entertainment on 25 February 2005 and charted at #60 in the Oricon Singles Chart on 7 March.

The single was re-released on 11 May 2011 by Marvelous AQL. The single also featured both of Max Heart's ending themes, "Muri Muri!? Ari Ari!! In jaa Na~i?!" (ムリムリ！？ありあり！！INじゃあな～い？！; "No way!? Unbeliveable!! Is that Okay?!") and "Wonder Winter Yatta" (ワンダーウィンターヤッタ, Wandā Wintā Yatta; "Wonder Winter Alright"), and karaoke versions of all three songs. Another version, also released on the same day, came with a DVD featuring creditless versions of the Max Heart opening sequence and both ending sequences. The single charted at #157 in the Oricon Singles Chart on 23 May.

=== "Danzen! Futari wa Pretty Cure~The One and Only Twin Lights~" ===
"Danzen! Futari wa Pretty Cure~The One and Only Twin Lights~" (DANZEN!ふたりはプリキュア～唯一無二の光たち～, DANZEN! Futari wa Purikyua 〜Yuiitsumuni no Hikaritachi〜) is a remixed version of the song, and the insert song for the Hugtto! PreCure Futari wa Pretty Cure: All Stars Memories fifteenth anniversary crossover film, again sung by Mayumi Gojo. The song was released as a single on 24 October 2018 by Marvelous, paired with Rewind Memory (a duet between Gojo and Kanako Miyamoto) and karaoke versions of both songs, and charted at #35 in the Oricon Singles Chart on 5 November of that year. A version containing a DVD featuring a TV-sized music video of the song was also released.

== Accolades ==
The original version of "Danzen! Futari wa Pretty Cure" won the Theme Song Award at the 9th Animation Kobe on 14 November 2004.
