= Hug! PreCure =

Japanese anime television series

- Cover of the last Blu-Ray volume, showing the five main Cures. From left to right: Cure Ange, Cure Etoile, Cure Yell, Cure Macherie and Cure Amour, with Hugtan in the center.

ＨＵＧっと！プリキュア (Hagutto! Purikyua)
- Genre: Magical girl
- Created by: Izumi Todo
- Anime television series
- Directed by: Junichi Sato; Akifumi Zako
- Produced by: Kazusa Umeda; Fumi Yazaki; Keisuke Naito
- Written by: Fumi Tsubota
- Music by: Yuki Hayashi
- Studio: Toei Animation
- Original network: ANN (ABC, TV Asahi)
- Original run: February 4, 2018 – January 27, 2019
- Episodes: 49
- Manga
- Written by: Izumi Todo
- Illustrated by: Futago Kamikita
- Published by: Kodansha
- Imprint: Wide KC
- Magazine: Nakayoshi
- Original run: February 2, 2018 – December 28, 2018
- Volumes: 2
- Anime film

Hug! Pretty Cure♡Futari wa Pretty Cure: All Stars Memories
- Directed by: Hiroshi Miyamoto
- Written by: Junko Kōmura
- Music by: Yuki Hayashi
- Studio: Toei Animation
- Released: October 27, 2018
- Runtime: 73 minutes

Hug! PreCure (ＨＵＧっと！プリキュア, Hagutto! Purikyua; lit. "With a Hug! Pretty Cure"), also known as HUGtto! PreCure, is a Japanese magical girl anime television series produced by Toei Animation. It is the fifteenth series in the Pretty Cure franchise, released to in commemoration of its 15th anniversary. It is directed by Junichi Sato, who previously worked and directed on Sailor Moon, Yume no Crayon Oukoku and Ojamajo Doremi and Akifumi Zako and written by Fumi Tsubota. The character designs were done by Toshie Kawamura, who previously worked on Yes! PreCure 5 and Smile PreCure!. It began airing on ANN on February 4, 2018, succeeding Kirakira PreCure a la Mode in its timeslot. It was then succeeded by Star Twinkle PreCure on February 3, 2019. The series' main topic is destiny and future, with dress code as the Cures' main motifs.

== Summary ==
13-year-old Hana Nono, a girl who aspires to be seen as a mature big sister figure, is beginning middle school in Hagukumi City when she encounters a strange baby named Hugtan and a hamster-like fairy named Harryham Harry, who appear from the sky. Amidst the encounter, Hana learns that they are being pursued by the Criasu Corporation, an evil conglomeration from the future who seeks the power of Hugtan's Mirai Crystal (ミライクリスタル, Mirai Kuristaru) to alter the present to suit their needs. Hana's desire to protect Hugtan causes her to gain her own Mirai Crystal and PreHeart, which transforms her into the Pretty Cure of High Spirits, Cure Yell. Together with Saaya Yakushiji and Homare Kagayaki, and later joined by Emiru Aisaki and Criasu android Ruru Amour, they form the Hug! Pretty Cure team to protect everyone's future.

== Characters ==
=== Pretty Cures ===
Hana Nono (野乃 はな, Nono Hana) / Cure Yell (キュアエール, Kyua Ēru)
Voiced by: Rie Hikisaka
The main protagonist. A 13-year-old transfer student who is willing to give anything a try, but often makes mistakes. She hopes to be seen as mature, but her energetic nature usually makes her come off as childish. As Cure Yell, she has a cheerleader motif and is known as the Pretty Cure of High Spirits, whose theme color is pink. She introduces herself by saying "Cheering on everyone! The Pretty Cure of High Spirits! Cure Yell!" (みんなを応援！元気のプリキュア！キュアエール！, Min'na wo Ōen! Genki no Purikyua! Kyua Ēru!). In the year 2030, she becomes the boss of a boutique corporation and gives birth to a daughter named Hagumi Nono, who was Hugtan's original self.
Saaya Yakushiji (薬師寺 さあや, Yakushiji Saaya) / Cure Ange (キュアアンジュ, Kyua Anju)
Voiced by: Rina Honnizumi
A 14-year-old girl who is the class representative of Hana's class who is known by her classmates for being responsible and smart. Her mother is a famous actress, and Saaya is conflicted over whether to follow her mother's footsteps or not. As Cure Ange, she has an angel and nurse motif and is known as the Pretty Cure of Wisdom, whose theme color is blue. She introduces herself by saying "Healing everyone! The Pretty Cure of Wisdom! Cure Ange!" (みんなを癒す！知恵のプリキュア！キュアアンジュ！, Min'na wo Iyasu! Chie no Purikyua! Kyua Anju!). In the year 2030, she becomes a doctor.
Homare Kagayaki (輝木 ほまれ, Kagayaki Homare) / Cure Etoile (キュアエトワール, Kyua Etowāru)
Voiced by: Yui Ogura
A 14-year-old girl in Hana's class who was once a figure skater, but quit after failing to complete a jump and injuring herself. Her injury eventually healed, but she became too scared to attempt jumping again. She has a mature personality, but also enjoys cute things. As Cure Etoile, she has a flight attendant motif and is known as the Pretty Cure of Strength, whose theme color is yellow. She introduces herself by saying "Making everyone shine! The Pretty Cure of Strength! Cure Étoile!" (みんな輝！力のプリキュア！キュアエトワール！, Min'na Kagayake! Chikara no Purikyua! Kyua Etowāru!). In the year 2030, she wins a figure skating tournament.
Emiru Aisaki (愛崎 えみる, Aisaki Emiru) / Cure Macherie (キュアマシェリ, Kyua Masheri)
Voiced by: Nao Tamura
An 11/12-year-old girl who initially displayed a strong liking to Hana. She adores the Cures and once cosplayed as one. It was also revealed that she is sometimes a troublemaker. She ends her sentences with "~nanodesu." She later discovered the Cures identities, and she also befriended Ruru. She wanted to become a Precure together with Ruru, the two managing to accomplish this when the last remaining PreHeart split to allow Emiru to transform into Cure Macherie together with Ruru as Cure Amour. As Cure Macherie, she has a Lolita motif and is known as the Pretty Cure of Love and Song, whose theme color is red. She transforms together with Cure Amour and they introduce themselves by saying "Loving everyone! The Pretty Cure of Love! Cure Macherie!" (みんな大好き！愛のプリキュア！キュアマシェリ！, Min'na Daisuki! Ai no Purikyua! Kyua Masheri!). In the year 2030, she becomes a singer and commissions Ruru's creation to reunite with her.
Ruru Amour (ルールー・アムール, Rūrū Amūru) / Cure Amour (キュアアムール, Kyua Amūru)
Voiced by: Yukari Tamura
Originally a part-time worker in the Criasu Corporation's Azababu branch office built by Dr. Traum, modeled after the scientist's daughter and designated RUR-9500, Ruru is a 13/14-year-old shy, quiet, and reserve gynoid who is initially devoted to Ristle while using flying saucers as weapons. Ruru infiltrates Hana's house while altering Sumire's memory to spy on the Cures, later stealing Homare's PreHeart on Papple's order to prevent the girl from helping her team. But Ruru returns the item to Homare after a change of heart, resulting in her being deactivated by Papple and taken away to be reprogramed and upgraded to be more combat-oriented with her memories erased. But while confronting the Cures, Ruru regained her memories and reconciled with them while quitting the Criasu Corporation. Later, after getting along with her new friends, she realized she wants to become a Precure together with Emiru, causing the last remaining PreHeart to split in two so she can transform into Cure Amour along with Emiru as Cure Macherie. As Cure Amour, she has a Lolita motif and is known as the Pretty Cure of Love and Dance, whose theme color is purple. She transforms together with Cure Macherie and they introduce themselves by saying "Loving everyone! The Pretty Cure of Love! Cure Amour!" (みんな大好き！愛のプリキュア！キュアアムール！, Min'na Daisuki! Ai no Purikyua! Kyua Amūru!). In the year 2030, Doctor Traum rebuilds her at Emiru's request, now as a young android capable of developing feelings. Despite her memories being reset and not recognizing Emiru, they rekindle their bond through guitar.
Hugtan (はぐたん, Hagu-tan) / Cure Tomorrow (キュアトゥモロー, Kyua Tumorō)
Voiced by: Konomi Tada
A mysterious baby who possesses a white Mirai Crystal. She is later revealed to be a Pretty Cure from the future named Cure Tomorrow, who was said to possess the power of Mother Heart. After her timeline was conquered by the Criasu Corporation and her teammates were captured, she used the crystal's power to escape to 2018 along with Harry, who she saved from turning into a monster, However, she turned into a baby as a result of using up her power. She is sensitive to the tomorrow-creating energy called Tomorrow Powerer and can use it to purify Oshimaida at the cost of exhausting herself into a deep sleep. While she is slowly maturing, she is said to need the power of all eight Mirai Crystals to fully restore herself. In the series' epilogue, which takes place in 2030, she is revealed to be Hana's daughter Hagumi Nono (野乃 はぐみ, Nono Hagumi). Her theme color is white.

=== Fairies ===
Hariham Harry (ハリハム・ハリー, Harihamu Harī)
Voiced by: Junko Noda (fairy form), Jun Fukushima (human form)
A hamster-like fairy who hails from the future, having been part of a clan of rodent-like fairies called the Harihari Clan from Harihari Township. After a pandemic struck the clan, he, Listol, and Bicine joined the Criasu Corporation after being told they would receive a cure, gaining human forms in the process. However, they were tricked and their village was burnt down. He later came to Cure Tomorrow's rescue, only to be turned into a monster; however, she saved him and he escaped with her to 2018, becoming her caretaker and mentor to the Pretty Cure. He speaks in Kansai dialect and can transform into a self-proclaimed "handsome" human form. He opens a salon known as "Beauty Harry" (ビューティーハリー, Byūtī Harī) that serves as the group's secret base. In episode 25, his past is revealed when Bicine confronts him and removes his necklace to force him into returning to the Criasu Corporation. However, Cure Etoile manages to save Harry and he remains adamant in fighting Criasu alongside the Cures. In the year 2030, he is seen alongside Listol, Bicine, Mogumogu, and Lily the cat. Unlike the other fairies, he does not end his sentences with a suffix.

=== Criasu Corporation ===
The Criasu Corporation (クライアス社, Kuraiasu Sha; Criasu Co., Ltd.) are the main antagonists of the series who originate from the distant future and aim to obtain the Mirai Crystals as part of George's scheme to freeze time. It is unknown when the corporation was founded, but its Azababu branch was founded in 2018. "Criasu" (クライアス, Kuraiasu) is derived from Kurai Asu (暗い明日) which can be translated as "Dark Tomorrow". The employees of the Criasu Corporation's Azababu Branch Office (あざばぶ支社, Azababu Shisha) have the power to draw out energy from people by using the Negative Wave (ネガティブウェーブ, Negatibu Uēbu), allowing them to create monsters called Oshimaida.

George Kurai (ジョージ・クライ, Jōji Kurai)
Voiced by: Junpei Morita
The president of the Criasu Corporation and the series' main antagonist. While appearing to be kind-hearted and sophisticated, he is actually a delusional and manipulative figure willing to achieve his goals at any cost. He seeks the power of the Mirai Crystals to take Earth's future away by freezing time in a moment of eternal joy, claiming that the people of his time are being consumed by the darkness in their hearts. Kurai assumes a human form to investigate the Pretty Cures in the present before revealing himself. He eventually begins his endgame by freezing time and turning his own headquarters into a giant monster to capture Hugtan. When this fails, he assumes his true form to battle Cure Yell before the people of Hakugumi help her and the Cures purify Kurai. As the Criasu Corporation's building collapses, he has a final moment with Hana before departing for an unknown location. It is later revealed that he was Hana's husband in the original timeline, but an unknown tragedy struck Hana and acted as a catalyst for his actions, causing him to develop an obsession with her current self. In the year 2030, his present counterpart is shown running to bring flowers to Hana, who will be his future wife, at the hospital.
Listol (リストル, Risutoru)
Voiced by: Shin-ichiro Miki
The secretary of the Criasu Corporation, He is a squirrel-like fairy who takes the form of a man wearing blue clothes and a dark gray cape. He is a strict person who acts for the sake of the company's goals, yet cares for his loved ones, particularly Bicine. Along with Hariham Harry and Bicine, he was tricked into working for the Criasu Corporation after being falsely promised a cure for their friends. The Cures purify him in episode 39 and episode 41 shows that Kurai has altered his memories to have no recollection of Harry. In episode 47, Kurai sends him to fight the Cures for a final time, but he is purified again. In the year 2030, he is seen alongside Harry, Bicine, Mogumogu, and Lily the cat.
Daigan (ダイガン)
Voiced by: Masanori Machida
The head of the Criasu Corporation's Azababu Branch Office. In episode 23, he tries to attack the Cures, but Dr. Traum backstabs him and he is severely injured. In episode 24, he is revealed to have been purified along with Papple, who recruits him to her talent agency. In episode 38, he briefly rejoins Criasu after becoming dissatisfied with his job, but the Cures purify him again. In the year 2030, he becomes Saaya's nursing assistant.
Papple (パップル, Pappuru)
Voiced by: Sayaka Ōhara
The beautiful and charming section chief of the Criasu Corporation's Azababu Branch Office, who wears a fur coat and holds a fan. She was originally Kurai's lover, but falls into despair after learning that he cheated on her with Gelos. In episode 22, she transforms herself into an Oshimaida to confront the Cures for the final time, but Macherie and Amour reach out to her and she is purified after being told she still has love. She has since opened her own talent agency alongside Charaleet and Daigan. In the year 2030, she encounters Homare, who is leaving for the hospital to support Hana, at the airport.
Charaleet (チャラリート, Chararīto)
Voiced by: Fukushi Ochiai
The chief clerk of the Criasu Corporation's Azababu Branch Office, a wisecracking youth who wears a sleeveless shirt. In episode 11, he is given a final chance to prove himself and forcefully turned into an Oshimaida to confront the Cures, but they defeat him with the newfound power of the Melody Swords. Following his purification, Charaleet leaves Criasu and becomes an internet celebrity, opening a talent agency alongside Papple and Daigan. In the year 2030, he is seen as a student alongside Gelos, Jinjin, and Takumi.
Gelos (ジェロス, Jerosu)
Voiced by: Yūko Kaida
The general manager of the Criasu Corporation's Azababu Branch Office, a woman who wears a red and black dress with a yellow coat. She has a delightful personality, yet hates emotions like friendship and love and fears losing her youth. She is Papple’s rival, and sometimes speaks English. In episode 34, her despair over losing Jinjin & Takumi causes her to take on a new form with a wild look and cruel personality. In episode 45, she uses the time-freezing device to absorb Prickly Powerer and becomes an Mou-Oshimaida to maintain her beauty. She confronts the Cures a final time before allowing herself to be purified. In the year 2030, she is seen as a student alongside Charaleet, Jinjin, and Takumi.
Dr. Traum (ドクター・トラウム, Dokutā Toraumu)
Voiced by: Takaya Hashi
The counselor of the Criasu Corporation's Azababu Branch Office, an elderly scientist who is Ruru Amour's creator and created her with the intent of replacing his daughter, who suffered an unknown fate. He develops inventions to use against the Cures and possesses the ability to empower Oshimaida into Mou-Oshimaida. In episodes 36 and 37, he designs a time-manipulating mecha to freeze time on Earth and turns himself into a Oshimaida to confront the Pretty Cure All Stars before being defeated. He then leaves the Criasu Corporation and makes amends with Ruru. In the year 2030, his present counterpart creates Ruru at Emiru's request.
Bicine (ビシン, Bishin)
Voiced by: Satomi Arai
The customer specialist of the Criasu Corporation's Azababu Branch Office and Hariham Harry's partner. He is a hamster-like fairy who takes on the form of a ferocious boy with white hair who wears bandages. Along with Hariham Harry and Listol, he was tricked into working for the Criasu Corporation under false pretenses and was imprisoned within the company because of his dangerous powers. But Listol eventually releases him to defeat the Pretty Cure, who Bicine considers an obstacle in winning back Harry, particularly Cure Etoile. In episode 47, he turns himself into an Mou-Oshimaida to confront the Cures, but is purified. In the year 2030, he is seen alongside Harry, Listol, Mogumogu, and Lily the cat.
Jinjin (ジンジン) and Takumi (タクミ)
Voiced by: Yoshio Kojima and Louis Yamada LIII
Gelos' personal bodyguards. In episode 31, they steal her time-freezing device, which accidentally fuses them into an Oshimaida that the Cures defeat. After being purified, Jinjin works at a food booth and Takumi works as a construction worker. They later play a role in reaching out to Gelos when she turns herself into an Mou-Oshimaida. In the year 2030, they are seen as students alongside Charaleet and Gelos.

==== Monsters ====
Oshimaida (オシマイダー, Oshimaidā)
Voiced by: Oolongta Yoshida
The monsters of the series, which the employees of the Criasu Corporation create from those overflowing with negative energy. After George Kurai’s return in episode 23, a more powerful type of Oshimaida called Mou-Oshimaida (猛オシマイダー, Mō-Oshimaidā; Wild Oshimaida) emerge.

=== Cures' families ===
Shintarou Nono (野乃 森太郎, Nono Shintarō)
Voiced by: Yasuhiro Mamiya
Hana's father, who is the manager of a home center called Hugman.
Sumire Nono (野乃 すみれ, Nono Sumire)
Voiced by: Natsuko Kuwatani
Hana's mother, who was known as Sumire Anno (庵野すみれ, Anno Sumire) before marrying Shintarou. She is a writer for Town Magazine (タウン誌, Taun-shi)
Kotori Nono (野乃 ことり, Nono Kotori)
Voiced by: Amina Sato
Hana's younger sister, who has a habit of teasing her for her upbeat and childish attitude. She is a close friend of Emiru.
Tanpopo Anno (庵野たんぽぽ, Anno Tanpopo)
Voiced by: Kikuko Inoue
Hana’s grandmother, who owns a wagashi shop called Dandelion Hall that is famous for its dorayaki.
Sousuke Anno (庵野草介, Anno Sousuke)
Voiced by: Eiji Takeuchi
Hana’s late grandfather, who was renowned for his "Manju of Hope" recipe.
Shuji Yakushiji (薬師寺 修司, Yakushiji Shūji)
Voiced by: Hiroki Tasaka
Saaya's father, who takes care of housework while his wife is busy.
Reira Yakushiji (薬師寺 れいら, Yakushiji Reira)
Voiced by: Maya Okamoto
Saaya's mother, who is a famous actress. Saaya describes her personality as "someone who is a little clumsy, but does her best" (ちょっと不器用で、でもすっごくがんばり屋, Chotto bukiyō de, demo suggoku ganbariya)
Chitose Kagayaki (輝木ちとせ, Kagayaki Chitose)
Voiced by: Tōko Aoyama
Homare’s mother, who is a crane operator. She and her husband divorced when Homare was young.
Chiyo Kagayaki (輝木ちよ, Kagayaki Chiyo)
Voiced by: Kaoru Katakai
Homare’s grandmother.
Kikuzou Kagayaki (輝木喜久蔵, Kagayaki Kikuzou)
Homare’s grandfather.
Haidon Aisaki (愛崎 俳呑, Aisaki Haidon), Miyako Aisaki (愛崎 都, Aisaki Miyako)
Voiced by: Toru Nomaguchi (Haidon) and Nobue Iketani (Miyako)
Emiru's father and mother, who later welcome Ruru and her friendship with Emiru.
Masato Aisaki (愛崎 正人, Aisaki Masato)
Voiced by: Yukari Shimotsuki
Emiru's misogynist older brother.
Baku Aisaki (愛崎獏発, Aisaki Baku)
Voiced by: Keiichi Noda
Emiru’s grandfather, who is the head of Aisaki Conglomerate.

=== L'Avenir Academy ===
Junna Tokura (十倉 じゅんな, Tokura Junna), Aki Momoi (百井 あき, Momoi Aki), Hinase Amano (阿万野 ひなせ, Amano Hinase), Fumito Chise (千瀬 ふみと, Chise Fumito)
Voiced by: Maria Naganawa (Junna), Afumi Hashi (Aki), Yoshitaka Yamaya (Hinase), Katsumi Fukuhara (Fumito)
Hana and Saaya's classmates. Hinase is the leader of the band club.
Uchifuji (内富士, Uchifuji)
Voiced by: Daisuke Namikawa
Hana and Saaya's homeroom teacher.
Umehashi (梅橋, Umehashi)
Voiced by: Masashi Tamaki
The P.E teacher at L'Avenir Academy and Homare's skating coach.

=== Others ===
Ranze Ichijou (一条 蘭世, Ichijō Ranze)
Voiced by: Aya Suzaki
A girl who is an actress and rival to Saaya.
Henri Wakamiya (若宮 アンリ, Wakamiya Anri) / Cure Infini (キュアアンフィニ, Kyua Anfini)
Voiced by: Toshiyuki Someya, Natsu Yorita (child)
Homare's childhood friend and a skater from Russia, who is a hāfu of French descent. In episode 42, he is involved in a traffic accident and breaks his left leg, making him unable to compete in an upcoming competition. As a result, he doubts his future and briefly becomes a member of the Criasu Corporation. Through a miracle with the Mirai Brace, Henri becomes Cure Infini for the first time, later joining the Cures in the final battle against George and his theme color is green. He is the first male Pretty Cure in the franchise before Cure Wing.
Mogumogu (もぐもぐ)
Voiced by: Natsumi Kawaida
Homare's adoptive dog, whom she found after saving him from getting run over by a truck.
Rita Yoshimi (吉見 リタ, Yoshimi Rita)
Voiced by: Kintalo
A genius fashion designer.
Yuka Uchifuji (内富士 ゆか, Uchifuji Yuuka)
Voiced by: Kaori Nazuka
Uchifuji’s wife.
Mother Heart (マザー・ハート, Mazā Hāto)
A mysterious being who appears to come from the White Mirai Crystal. Her power allows both Ruru and Emiru to become Cures, and is also used in the group attack Tomorrow With Everyone. Hugtan is said to have possessed her power as Cure Tomorrow, which was partly why George was after her.
Nagisa Misumi (美墨 なぎさ, Misumi Nagisa) / Cure Black (キュアブラック, Kyua Burakku)
Voiced by: Yōko Honna

The main protagonist from Futari wa Pretty Cure & Futari wa Pretty Cure Max Heart

Honoka Yukishiro (雪城 ほのか, Yukishiro Honoka) / Cure White (キュアホワイト, Kyua Howaito)
Voiced by: Yukana

A Cure from Futari wa Pretty Cure & Futari wa Pretty Cure Max Heart

Hikari Kujo (九条 ひかり, Kūjō Hikari) / Shiny Luminous (シャイニールミナス, Shainī Ruminasu)
Voiced by: Rie Tanaka

A Cure from Futari wa Pretty Cure Max Heart

Mepple (メップル, Meppuru)
Voiced by: Tomokazu Seki

Fairy from Futari wa Pretty Cure & Futari wa Pretty Cure Max Heart

Mipple (ミップル, Mippuru)
Voiced by: Akiko Yajima

Fairy from Futari wa Pretty Cure & Futari wa Pretty Cure Max Heart

Nozomi Yumehara (夢原 のぞみ, Yumehara Nozomi) / Cure Dream (キュアドリーム, Kyua Dorīmu)
Voiced by: Yūko Sanpei

A Cure from Yes! PreCure 5 & Yes! PreCure 5 GoGo!

Bunbee (ブンビー, Bunbī)
Voiced by: Wataru Takagi

A Cure Ally from Yes! PreCure 5 & Yes! PreCure 5 GoGo!

Love Momozono (桃園 ラブ, Momozono Rabu) / Cure Peach (キュアピーチ, Kyua Pīchi)
Voiced by: Kanae Oki

A Cure from Fresh Pretty Cure!

Tart (タルト, Taruto)
Voiced by: Taiki Matsuno

Fairy from Fresh Pretty Cure!

Chiffon (シフォン, Shifon)
Voiced by: Satomi Kōrogi

Fairy from Fresh Pretty Cure!

Megumi Aino (愛乃 めぐみ, Aino Megumi) / Cure Lovely (キュアラブリー, Kyua Raburī)
Voiced by: Megumi Nakajima

The main protagonist from HappinessCharge Pretty Cure!

Haruka Haruno (春野 はるか, Haruno Haruka) / Cure Flora (キュアフローラ, Kyua Furōra)
Voiced by: Yū Shimamura

The main protagonist from Go! Princess Pretty Cure

Mirai Asahina (朝日奈 みらい, Asahina Mirai) / Cure Miracle (キュアミラクル, Kyua Mirakuru)
Voiced by: Rie Takahashi

The main protagonist from Witchy Pretty Cure!

Liko Izayoi (十六夜 リコ, Izayoi Riko) / Cure Magical (キュアマジカル, Kyua Majikaru)

A Cure from Witchy Pretty Cure!

Kotoha Hanami (花海 ことは, Hanami Kotoha) / Cure Felice (キュアフェリーチェ, Kyua Ferīche)

A Cure from Witchy Pretty Cure!

Mofurun (モフルン, Mofurun)
Voiced by: Ayaka Saitō

A teddy bear Fairy from Witchy Pretty Cure!

Ichika Usami (宇佐美 いちか, Usami Ichika) / Cure Whip (キュアホイップ, Kyua Hoippu)
Voiced by: Karen Miyama

The main protagonist from Kirakira PreCure a la Mode

Himari Arisugawa (有栖川 ひまり, Arisugawa Himari) / Cure Custard (キュアカスタード, Kyua Kasutādo)
Voiced by: Haruka Fukuhara

A Cure from Kirakira PreCure a la Mode

Aoi Tategami (立神 あおい, Tategami Aoi) / Cure Gelato (キュアジェラート, Kyua Jerāto)
Voiced by: Tomo Muranaka

A Cure from Kirakira PreCure a la Mode

Yukari Kotozume (琴爪 ゆかり, Kotozume Yukari) / Cure Macaron (キュアマカロン, Kyua Makaron)
Voiced by: Saki Fujita

A Cure from Kirakira PreCure a la Mode

Akira Kenjou (剣城 あきら, Kenjō Akira) / Cure Chocolat (キュアショコラ, Kyua Shokora)
Voiced by: Nanako Mori

A Cure from Kirakira PreCure a la Mode

Ciel Kirahoshi (キラ星 シエル, Kirahoshi Shieru) / Cure Parfait (キュアパルフェ, Kyua Parufe)
Voiced by: Inori Minase
Pekorin (ペコリン)
Voiced by: Mika Kanai

A puppy-like Fairy from Kirakira PreCure a la Mode

Elder (長老, Chōrō)
Voiced by: Yū Mizushima

A wise old Fairy from Kirakira PreCure a la Mode

Hikaru Hoshina (星奈 ひかる, Hoshina Hikaru) / Cure Star (キュアスター, Kyua Sutā)
Voiced by: Eimi Naruse
The main protagonist of Star Twinkle PreCure. A second-year middle school student who loves stars and constellations. As a Pretty Cure, she transforms into Cure Star (キュアスター, Kyua Sutā).

=== Movie characters ===
Clover (クローバー, Kurōbā)
Voiced by: Kenshō Ono
A mysterious boy who met Hana when she was young, and fell under Usobakka's influence to hate her after she failed to keep her promise to him. While Hana is able to persuade Clover to come back with her, he ultimately sacrifices himself to enable the other Cures to transform and defeat Usobakka, with his spirit making peace with the demon before fading away.
Usobakka (ウソバーッカ, Usobākka) / Dark Onibi (闇の鬼火, Yami no Onibi)
Voiced by: Kazuki Kitamura
The main antagonist in PreCure Super Stars!. A deceitful and manipulative demon who influenced Clover to hate Hana for not keeping her promise to the boy. He seals all the Cures except for Hana, Ichika and Mirai into his body to be petrified. While Hana persuades Clover to help them find a way to escape, Ichika and Mirai fend Usobakka off before they and the rest of their teams escape from his body. With the power from Clover and the Miracle Lights, they are able to defeat him, with Clover's ghost making peace with him before fading away.
Miden (ミデン)
Voiced by: Mamoru Miyano
The main antagonist in Hug! Pretty Cure Futari wa Pretty Cure: All Stars Memories. A teru teru bozu who originates from a camera and steals the memories and powers of the Pretty Cure, turning them into infants. They can also make smaller versions of themselves that swarm like locusts. Despite their childish personality, they are actually lonely and depressed because they lack original memories. After Cure Yell comforts them, they are purified by the 55 Pretty Cures who transmit their feelings to it, finally freeing them from their grief. They are last seen as the same camera they originated from, which Hana uses to take photographs of the Cures.
Mizuki Yamamoto (山本 美月, Yamamoto Mizuki)
Voiced by: Herself
A reporter who appears in Hug! Pretty Cure Futari wa Pretty Cure: All Stars Memories and is caught in the crossroads of the Futari wa Cures' battle with a monster.

== Media ==
=== Anime ===
The series was first revealed through a trademark posting filed in September 2017. The series was officially announced on November 28, 2017 and began airing on All-Nippon News Network stations in Japan including ABC and TV Asahi from February 4, 2018, replacing Kirakira Pretty Cure a la Mode in its timeslot. The opening theme is called "We can!! HUG! Pretty Cure" (We can!! HUGっと! プリキュア, We can!! HUGtto! Purikyua) by Kanako Miyamoto. The first ending theme is called "HUG! Future✩Dreamer" (HUGっと! 未来☆ドリーマー, HUGtto! Mirai✩Dorīma) performed by Rie Hikisaka, Rina Honnizumi, and Yui Ogura, while the second ending theme is called "HUG! Yell For You" (HUGっと! YELL FOR YOU, HUGtto! YELL FOR YOU) performed by the aforementioned three alongside Nao Tamura, and Yukari Tamura. The background music is composed by Yuki Hayashi, who previously composed the music for Kirakira PreCure a la Mode. The first official soundtrack for the series was released on April 25, 2018, with the title PreCure Sound For You!!, and the second was released on December 26, 2018, with the title PreCure Cheerful Sound!!.

=== Manga ===
A manga adaptation illustrated by Futago Kamikita was serialized in Kodansha's Nakayoshi magazine between February 2 and December 28, 2018.

=== Films ===
The characters of the series appeared alongside characters from Kirakira PreCure a la Mode and Witchy PreCure! in the crossover film, Pretty Cure Super Stars!, which was released in Japan on March 17, 2018. In addition, a film honoring the franchise's 15th anniversary, titled Hug! Pretty Cure Futari wa Pretty Cure: All Stars Memories, was released on October 27, 2018. The film featured characters from HUG! PreCure teaming up with the original Pretty Cures from Futari wa Pretty Cure, who also appear in episodes 21, 22, 36, and 37.

Pretty Cure Miracle Universe (映画 プリキュアミラクルユニバース, Eiga Purikyua Mirakuru Yunivāsu), was released on March 16, 2019.

Pretty Cure Miracle Leap: A Strange Day With Everyone! (映画 プリキュアミラクルリープ みんなとの不思議な1日, Eiga Purikyua Mirakuru Rīpu: Min'na to no Fushigi na Ichinichi), was released on October 31, 2020.

=== Video game ===
A video game titled Nari Kids Park: HUG! PreCure, was released by Bandai Namco Entertainment for the Nintendo Switch in Japan on November 21, 2018.

== Reception ==
Fans critically praised episode 19 for its message regarding gender stereotypes, and that children can become who they want to be regardless of their gender.

The film All Stars Memories topped Japanese box office records in its first release in theaters. It earned more than US$9.18 million in total ticket sales, and currently owns the Guinness World Record for "Most Magical Warriors in an Anime Film", with a total of 55 Cures.

Rina Honnizumi won the Best New Actress Award for her portrayal of Cure Ange at the 13th Seiyu Awards.

Cosplay marathoner Mitsunobu Saita ran in the 2018 Kobe Marathon as Cure Yell.

Preceded by Kirakira PreCure a la Mode	Hug! PreCure; 2018–2019	Succeeded by Star Twinkle PreCure
