= Tomo Muranaka =

Japanese voice actress (born 1989)

- 村中 知
- Born: December 15, 1989 (age 36); Ibaraki Prefecture, Japan
- Occupation: Voice actress
- Years active: 2008–present
- Agent: Haikyō
- Height: 1.56 m (5 ft 1 1/2 in)

Tomo Muranaka (村中 知, Muranaka Tomo; born December 15, 1989) is a Japanese voice actress from Ibaraki Prefecture. She is affiliated with Haikyō.

== Filmography ==
=== Television animation ===
2010

- Robin-kun to 100-nin Otomodachi Series 2 as Phillip

2012

- From the New World as Child (eps 1-2)
- Kuromajo-san ga Toru!! as Daigorō Iwata
- La storia della Arcana Famiglia as Jolly (child)
- Say "I love you". as Female student (ep 7); Woman (ep 3)
- Sword Art Online as Gin (eps 11-12)
- The Knight in the Area as Mina Nakae
- The Pet Girl of Sakurasou as, TV: Woman (ep 4)

2013

- A Certain Scientific Railgun S as Researcher C (ep 13); Staff Member E (ep 7)
- D.C. III: Da Capo III
- Dog & Scissors as Reporter (ep 1)
- Golden Time as Underclassman Club Member 2 (ep 8)
- High School DxD New as Magician (ep 11)
- Kotoura-san as Child (ep 8); Woman (ep 11)
- Little Busters! as Tarō
- Love Live! School Idol Project as Mathematics Teacher (ep 2), Friend A (ep 4)
- Strike the Blood as Caster (ep 3); Possessed Mask (ep 10)
- Tanken Driland - 1000-nen no Mahō - as Wolf Spirit Rhean (ep 4)
- Futari wa Milky Holmes as Female Teacher (eps 3, 9)
- The Devil Is a Part-Timer! as Operator A (ep 2)
- The Eccentric Family as Nakai B

2014

- Aldnoah.Zero as Female soldier
- Argevollen as Female soldier (ep 3)
- Atelier Escha & Logy: Alchemists of the Dusk Sky as Micie Sun Mussemburg
- Celestial Method as Teacher (ep 3)
- Invaders of the Rokujyōma!? as Takahashi (ep 3)
- Is the Order a Rabbit? as Female Customer (ep 10)
- Nagi-Asu: A Lull in the Sea as Sayu's mother
- Nanana's Buried Treasure as Yumi Hino (ep 6)
- Oreca Battle as Fire Orega
- Selector Spread WIXOSS (2014) as Manager (ep 6)
- Strike the Blood as Female Attendant (ep 15)
- World Trigger as Yūma Kuga
- Your Lie in April as Judge (ep 2)

2015

- Aquarion Logos as Announcement
- Chivalry of a Failed Knight as Boy (ep 3); Stella's mother (ep 1)
- Comet Lucifer as Lilian Anatolia, Black Guardian (ep 10, 12)
- Diabolik Lovers More, Blood as Ruki (young)
- Food Wars! Shokugeki no Soma as Megumi's mother (eps 3-4, 20-22)
- Gangsta. as Emilio (young), Arthur (ep 10)
- Ghost in the Shell: Arise Alternative Architecture as Amuri (ep 4); operator A (eps 5-6)
- Gintama° as Izumi's Brother (ep 278)
- Haikyū!! Second Season as Kei Tsukishima (young)
- Heavy Object as Lady (ep 3); Trainer (ep 4)
- High School DXD BorN as Queen (ep 8)
- Lance N' Masques as Boy (ep 11)
- Lupin the Third (2015) as Reporter (ep 6)
- Maria the Virgin Witch as Clansman (ep 8)
- Mobile Suit Gundam: Iron-Blooded Orphans as Akihiro Altland (young)
- Tantei Kageki Milky Holmes TD as Officer A; Nicholas
- The Heroic Legend of Arslan as Fake Tahamine (ep 6)
- The Idolmaster Cinderella Girls as Aki Yamato (ep 5)
- The Idolmaster Cinderella Girls 2nd Season as Aki Yamato (ep 25)
- Transformers: Robots in Disguise as Russell Clay
- Your Lie in April as Nurse (ep 21)

2016

- Active Raid as Female clerk A
- BBK/BRNK as Sōya Arabashiri (child)
- The File of Young Kindaichi Returns Season 2 as Ayame Kagehira (eps 38-41)
- Future Card Buddyfight Triple D as Bal
- Gate: Jieitai Kano Chi nite, Kaku Tatakaeri Season 2 as Fen (ep 17)
- Luck & Logic as Headquarters staff A (ep 11)
- Lupin the Third (2015) as Yoshio Watson Ōbayashi (ep 21)
- Digimon Universe: Appli Monsters as Bootmon (ep 43)

2017

- Kirakira PreCure a la Mode as Aoi Tategami/Cure Gelato

2018

- FLCL Progressive as Gorō Mori
- Hugtto! PreCure as Aoi Tategami/Cure Gelato (eps 36-37)
- That Time I got Reincarnated as a Slime as Greater Spirit of Light (episode 23, OAD episodes 3 & 5)

2019

- Case Closed as Kaori Kanno (ep 936)

2020

- Magia Record, Akira Shinobu (Ep.6)
- Japan Sinks: 2020, Gō Mutō

2021

- World Trigger 2nd Season as Yūma Kuga
- World Trigger 3rd Season as Yūma Kuga

2022

- Boruto: Naruto Next Generations as Harika Aburame (ep 261)

=== Original video animation (OVA) ===
2014

- Ghost in the Shell: Arise (2014), Amuri (ep 1); Opeko A (ep 2)

=== Original net animation (ONA) ===
2014

- Sailor Moon Crystal as Housewife (ep 3)
- Scott Pilgrim Takes Off as Kim Pine

=== Theatrical animation ===
2015

- Sinbad: Sora Tobu Hime to Himitsu no Shima as Sinbad
- Go! Princess PreCure The Movie: Go! Go!! Splendid Triple Feature!!! as Kin

2017

- Kirakira PreCure a la Mode: Crispy! The Mille-feuille of Memories! as Aoi Tategami/Cure Gelato

2018

- PreCure Super Stars! as Aoi Tategami/Cure Gelato
- Hugtto! PreCure Futari wa Pretty Cure: All Stars Memories as Aoi Tategami/Cure Gelato
- Mobile Suit Gundam Narrative as Michelle Luio

2019

- PreCure Miracle Universe as Aoi Tategami/Cure Gelato

=== Video games ===
2008

- Lord of Vermilion as Baba Yaga, Shizuka Gozen

2013

- Atelier Escha & Logy: Alchemists of the Dusk Sky as Micie Sun Mussemburg
- Conception II: Children of the Seven Stars as Aquatics Captain
- The Wonderful 101 as Alice MacGregor

2014

- Robot Girls Z Online as Glossam X2; Horuzon V3

2015

- The Idolmaster Cinderella Girls as Aki Yamato

2017

- Magia Record as Akira Shinobu

2019

- One Piece: World Seeker as Roule

2021

- Resident Evil Village as Daniela Dimitrescu
- Arknights as Wild Mane

=== Drama CD ===
- Angels Candies (Evil)
- Robot Girls Z BD/DVD Vol.1 Drama CD (2014), Glossam X2

=== Dubbing ===
==== Live-action ====
- The 5th Wave as Ringer (Maika Monroe)
- Alita: Battle Angel as Koyomi K. (Lana Condor)
- The Batman as Bella Reál (Jayme Lawson)
- Big Game as Oskari (Onni Tommila)
- Birds of Prey as Dinah Lance / Black Canary (Jurnee Smollett-Bell)
- Brain Games as Marsai Martin
- Cruella as Anita "Tattletale" Darling (Kirby Howell-Baptiste)
- The Day Shall Come as Kendra Glack (Anna Kendrick)
- Decision to Leave as Yeon-su (Kim Shin-young)
- Earth to Echo as Alex Nichols (Teo Halm)
- Fifty Shades Darker as Mia Grey (Rita Ora)
- Fifty Shades Freed as Mia Gray (Rita Ora)
- The Flash as Iris West (Candice Patton)
- Joker: Folie à Deux as Harleen "Lee" Quinzel / Harley Quinn (Lady Gaga)
- The Marvels as Monica Rambeau (Teyonah Parris)
- Meg 2: The Trench as Rigas (Melissanthi Mahut)
- Obi-Wan Kenobi as Reva Sevander / Third Sister (Moses Ingram)
- Ocean's 8 as Nine Ball (Rihanna)
- The Ridiculous 6 as Smoking Fox (Julia Jones)
- SEAL Team as Lisa Davis (Toni Trucks)
- Shooter as Nadine Memphis (Cynthia Addai-Robinson)
- Smile 2 as Skye Riley (Naomi Scott)
- Vigil as Kirsten Longacre (Rose Leslie)
- Westworld as Charlotte Hale (Tessa Thompson)
- WandaVision as Monica Rambeau (Teyonah Parris)
- Zhong Kui: Snow Girl and the Dark Crystal as Zhong Ling (Yang Zishan)

==== Animation ====
- Glitch Techs as Miko Kubota
- The Powerpuff Girls as Buttercup
