= Futago Kamikita =

Twin Japanese manga artists

- Born: August 11 Ochi, Kōchi Prefecture, Japan
- Areas: Manga artist, character designer
- Notable works: Pretty Cure; Yatterman

Jitsuna Kamikita (上北実那, Kamikita Jitsuna) and Kizuna Kamikita (上北希沙, Kamikita Kizuna), born August 11 in Kōchi Prefecture, are two Japanese manga artists and character designers, twin sisters, who work together under the pseudonym of Futago Kamikita (上北ふたご, Kamikita Futago; lit. the Kamikita twins). They are best known internationally for creating the manga versions of the Pretty Cure franchise.

Their previous pen names include Futago Kamikitazawa (上北沢ふたご, Kamikitazawa Futago; lit. the Kamikitazawa twins), and Shimai Kamikita (上北姉妹, Kamikita Shimai; lit. the Kamikita sisters).

== Biography ==
The Kamikita twins started drawing at a young age, influenced by their mother, passionate about painting. Later on, they attended the University of Tokyo.

As animators and designers in Hiroshi Sasagawa's studio, in 1989 they won the Shueisha Akatsuka Award with RED HOT, published in the special winter issue of Shōnen Jump. From 2002 to 2004, they drew the paper version of Akubi Girl, and then they started adapting Pretty Cure, serialized in Nakayoshi, of which they also realized short sticker stories throughout the years. In 2006, the Kamikita twins participated in designing the monsters of Yu-Gi-Oh! GX. 2006 was also the year of Otona no naisho-banashi ~ Tobī to Eruka no dokidoki nikki ~ (大人のないしょ話～トビーとエルカのドキドキ日記～, lit. The secret story of adults ~ Toby and Eruka's diary ~). In January 2008, the joined the staff of the remake of Yatterman as character designers.

In 2011 they joined the planning of the collectible card game Cardfight!! Vanguard. In the second half of 2012, they illustrated three storybooks for children: Cinderella, Snow White and The Little Mermaid.

== Works ==
=== Manga ===
- RED HOT – short story, 1989
- Kekkō majo kamo (けっこう魔女かも, Kekkō majo kamo) – short story, 1995
- Kimagure Matatabishi Star (きまぐれマタタビシスターズ, Kimagure Matatabishi Sutāzu) – 1995–1996
- Akubi Girl (よばれてとびでて！アクビちゃん, Yobarete tobidete! Akubi-chan) – 2002–2004
- Futari wa Pretty Cure (ふたりはプリキュア, Futari ha Purikyua) – single volume, 2004–2005
- Futari wa Pretty Cure Max Heart (ふたりはプリキュア Max Heart (ー マックスハート), Futari ha Purikyua Makkusu Hāto) – 2005–2006
- Eiga Futari wa Pretty Cure Max Heart (映画 ふたりはプリキュア Max Heart (ー マックスハート), Eiga Futari ha Purikyua Makkusu Hāto) – single volume, 2005
- Eiga Futari wa Pretty Cure Max Heart 2 Yukizora no tomodachi (映画 ふたりはプリキュア Max Heart 2 (ー マックスハート2) 雪空のともだち, Eiga Futari ha Purikyua Makkusu Hāto 2 Yukizora no tomodachi) – single volume, 2005
- Futari wa Pretty Cure Splash☆Star (ふたりはプリキュア Splash☆Star (スプラッシュ☆スター), Futari ha Purikyua Splash☆Star) – 2 volumes, 2006–2007
- Eiga Futari wa Pretty Cure Splash☆Star Tick tack kiki ippatsu! (映画 ふたりはプリキュア Splash☆Star (スプラッシュ☆スター) チクタク危機一髪！, Eiga Futari ha Purikyua Supurashu☆Sutā Chiku taku kiki ippatsu!) – single volume, 2006
- Otona no naisho-banashi ~ Tobī to Eruka no dokidoki nikki ~ (大人のないしょ話～トビーとエルカのドキドキ日記～, lett. The secret story of adults ~ Toby and Eruka's diary ~) – 2006
- Yes! PreCure 5 (Yes！プリキュア5, Iesu! Purikyua 5) – 2007–2008
- Yes! PreCure 5 GoGo! (Yes！プリキュア5 GoGo！, Iesu! Purikyua 5 GoGo!) – 2008–2009
- Fresh Precure! (フレッシュプリキュア！, Furesshu Purikyua!) – 2 volumes, 2009–2010
- HeartCatch PreCure! (ハートキャッチプリキュア！, Hātokyatchi Purikyua!) – 2 volumes, 2010–2011
- Suite Precure♪ (スイートプリキュア♪, Suīto Purikyua♪) – 2 volumes, 2011–2012
- Smile Precure! (スマイルプリキュア！, Sumairu Purikyua!) – 2012–2013
- Dokidoki! PreCure (ドキドキ！プリキュア, Dokidoki! PuriKyua) – 2013–2014
- HappinessCharge PreCure! (ハピネスチャージプリキュア!, Hapinesu Chāji Purikyua) – 2014–2015
- Go! Princess PreCure (Go！プリンセスプリキュア, Gō! Purinsesu PuriKyua) – 2015–2016
- Maho Girls PreCure! (魔法つかいプリキュア！, Mahōtsukai Purikyua!) – 2016–2017
- Kirakira PreCure a la Mode (キラキラ☆プリキュアアラモード, Kirakira ☆ Purikyua Ara Mōdo) – 2017–2018
- Hugtto! PreCure (HUGっと！プリキュア, Hagutto! Purikyua) – 2018–2019
- Star Twinkle PreCure (スター☆トゥインクルプリキュア, Sutā Tuinkuru Purikyua) – 2019
- Healin' Good Pretty Cure (ヒーリングっど♡プリキュア, Hīrin Guddo Purikyua) – 2020–2021
- Tropical-Rouge! Pretty Cure (トロピカル～ジュ！プリキュア, Toropikarūju! Purikyua) – 2021–2022
- Delicious Party Pretty Cure (デリシャスパーティ♡プリキュア, Derishasu Pāti♡Purikyua) – 2022–2023
- Soaring Sky! Pretty Cure (ひろがるスカイ！プリキュア, Hirogaru Sukai! Purikyua) – 2023–2024
- Wonderful Pretty Cure! (素晴らしいプリキュア, Wanderful Purikyua) – 2024–2025
- You and Idol Pretty Cure (あなたとアイドルプリキュア, Kimi to Aidoru Purikyua) – 2025–2026

=== Illustrated books ===
- Perrault, Charles (May 30, 2012). Hashigo, Yūko (ed.). シンデレラ [Cinderella] (in Japanese). Kawade Shobō Shinsha. p. 24. 430968002X.
- Andersen, Hans Christian (September 30, 2012). Kusushi, Yūuma (ed.). にんぎょひめ [The Little Mermaid] (in Japanese). Kawade Shobō Shinsha. p. 24. MEISAKU006.
- Kusushi, Yūuma, ed. (December 30, 2012). しらゆきひめ [Snow White] (in Japanese). Kawade Shobō Shinsha. p. 24. MEISAKU009.

== Character design ==
- Time Bokan
  - Yattodetaman (1981)
  - Gyakuten! Ippatsuman (1982–1983)
  - Itadakiman (1983)
  - Time Bokan 2000: Kaitou Kiramekiman (2000)
  - Yatterman (2008)
- Yoroshiku Mechadock (1984–1985)
- Akubi Girl (2001)
- Yu-Gi-Oh! GX (2004-2008)
- Ippatsuhitchū!! Devander (2012)
