= Tanken Driland =

Japanese mobile game & its adaptations

探検ドリランド (Tanken Dorirando)
- Video game
- Genre: Fantasy
- Platform: iOS, Android
- Manga
- Published by: Shueisha
- Magazine: Jump Square
- Original run: 2012 – 2013
- Volumes: 1
- Anime television series
- Directed by: Toshinori Fukuzawa
- Written by: Miyuki Kurei; Yōichi Takahashi
- Music by: Yoshihisa Hirano
- Studio: Toei Animation
- Original network: TXN (TV Tokyo), AT-X
- Original run: 7 July 2012 – 30 March 2013
- Episodes: 37
- Anime television series

Tanken Driland: Sennen no Mahō
- Directed by: Toshinori Fukuzawa
- Written by: Atsuhiro Tomioka
- Music by: Yoshihisa Hirano
- Studio: Toei Animation
- Original network: TXN (TV Tokyo), AT-X
- Original run: 6 April 2013 – 30 March 2014
- Episodes: 51

Tanken Driland (探検ドリランド, Tanken Dorirando; lit. 'Exploration Driland') is a Japanese mobile game developed by GREE, Inc. A manga adaptation began serialization in Jump Square in 2012. An anime series by Toei Animation and TV Tokyo began airing on 7 July 2012.

== Gameplay ==
Tanken Driland is a card-battling quest-based RPG. The player assumes the role of a hunter, and acquires hero cards which are used to defeat dire monsters and collect treasures. The cards gain experience points and can be upgraded. It is also a cooperative game; players can team up to defeat stronger opponents.

== Characters ==
=== First series ===
Mikoto (ミコト)
Voiced by: Kanako Miyamoto

The main character in the story is the Princess of Elua who wishes to become a hunter innit. She is kind and doesn't leave any of her friends behind. In episode 10, it is shown that she has mysterious powers. Her weapon is a sword.

Wallens (ウォーレンス, Uōrensu)
Voiced by: Kenji Nojima

Mikoto's personal assistant, he cares greatly and protects Mikoto from any dangers. He has motion sickness.

Pollon (ポロン)
Voiced by: Motoko Kumai

Poron wants to become a hero and show his brothers and his parents how strong he is. He received a small hat from a fairy in episode 2. His weapon is a gun which at the beginning he did not know how to use. He loves to eat and always carries some food. He also loves looking for treasures.

Pan (パーン, Pān)
Voiced by: Kōki Uchiyama

A hunter who first appeared in episode 4. He first travels alone but then starts traveling with the gang. His weapon is something like a spear.

Peffu (ペフー)
Voiced by: Masami Suzuki
Bonny (ボニー, Bonī)
Voiced by: Masako Nozawa

A hunter who teaches Mikoto everything there needs to be a hunter. She also trains her. Boni has a hawk named Alder.

Cremoya (クレモア, Kuremoa)
Voiced by: Mahito Ōba

He worries about Mikoto a lot and doesn't what her to become a hunter because it is too dangerous. He somewhat knows about Mikoto's powers. At episode 7 he finally says that Mikoto can become a hunter.

Hauwy (ハーウィー, Hāuī)
Voiced by: Sayuri Hara
Alvida (アルビダ, Arubida)
Voiced by: Akemi Kanda
Clam (クラム, Kuramu)
Voiced by: Yasuhiko Kawazu
Chowder (チャウダー, Chaudā)
Voiced by: Yasuhiro Takato

=== Sennen no Mahō ===
==== Main party ====
Hagan (ハガン)
Voiced by: Mayumi Yamaguchi

The main character in the story of Sennen no Mahō, he wields a drill-shaped sword capable of drilling as well as enlarging. Accidentally swallowing the Goddess Drop, he acquired magical energy, allowing him to return the others powers temporarily.

Kibamaru, the Blazing Sword (激炎剣キバマル, Gekienken Kibamaru)
Voiced by: Motoko Kumai

Flame Mononofu Hunter.

Feylin, the Thunder Butterflower (雷蝶花フェイリン, Raichōka Feirin)
Voiced by: Yū Shimamura

Thunder Magical Hunter.

Nagare (輝水卿ナガレ, Kisuikyō Nagare)/Fahn, the Golden Masked (黄金仮面ファーン, Ōgon Kamen Fān)
Voiced by: Kenji Nojima, Yukiko Morishita (child)

A Water Spear Hunter, he is a snail lover. In episode 71, he left the team, then Claudia encouraged him to go back to the team. After that, he saved Hagan and Kibamaru by his new skill from Nasha.

Yuppi (♨っぴい)
Voiced by: Taiki Matsuno
Peho (ペホー)
Voiced by: Masami Suzuki
Mekki & Shakki (メッキ&シャッキ)
Voiced by: Tetsuya Yanagihara & Kanako Miyamoto

A minor antagonists of the 1st arc of Sennen no Mahō and narrators of the mini-corner Mekki & Shakki's Drillous World. Mekki and Shakki join the main party of 2nd arc.

Belinda, the Fall Angel Knight (堕天騎士ベリンダ, Daten Kishi Berinda)
Voiced by: Yukana

==== Hunters ====
Haruka (ハルカ)
Voiced by: Yōko Hikasa

Narrator of the story of Mikoto and Hunter of Sennen no Mahō.

Pahn (パーン, Pān)
Voiced by: Kōki Uchiyama
Ageha Shinki Machi (アゲハ神姫マチ)
Voiced by: Urara Takano

The Goddess that rules over fire, she was found and freed by Hagan and the others. She was captured by Gort after helping Hagan free Clara.

Clara, the Moon Angel (月天使クララ, Tsukitenshi Kurara)
Voiced by: Mariko Kouda

Her card was originally found by Haruka but was stolen by Zelgado. Gort engulfed in darkness twisting her personality, making her into his servant. She was freed by Hagan in episode 20 so that she hugged him when she saw him.

Sophia, the Lightning Magician (雷光魔導ソフィア, Raikō Madō Sofia)
Voiced by: Yūko Mizutani She's the goddess who ruled over thunder.
Digras (回転師ディグラス, Kaitenshi Digurasu)
Voiced by: Hideyuki Tanaka He led Kibamaru and other teammates to attack Goda.
Dias (蒼焔騎士ディアス, Sōen Kishi Diasu)
Voiced by: Kappei Yamaguchi
Favio (多節棍ファビオ, Tasetsukon Fabio)
Voiced by: Hidekatsu Shibata
Lucy (鉄壁女神リュシー, Teppeki Megami Ryushī)
Voiced by: Yumi Shimura
Rinko (愛騎士リンコ, Ai Kishi Rinko)
Voiced by: Yūka Nakatsukasa
Suzume (長刀小町スズメ, Chōto Komachi Suzume)
Voiced by: Mai Goto
Claudia (水魔導神クラウディア, Mizumadōshin Kuraudia)
Voiced by: Kikuko Inoue
Mikoto (ミコト)
Voiced by: Kanako Miyamoto
Warence & Poron (ウォーレンス&ポロン, Uōrensu to Poron)
Voiced by: Kenji Nojima & Motoko Kumai

==== Terreur ====
Zelgado (幽玄兵ゼルガド, Yūgenhei Zerugado)
Voiced by: Yasuyuki Kase

Zelgado was originally a firefighter in Retron but after his younger sister died, and the people of Retron living slovenly after her sacrifice, he left and became a Hunter. He met Gort, who told him that he will bring his sister back to life if he helps Gort become God. He wields a sword and uses the element of water.

Hilde (香烈姫ヒルデ, Kōretsuki Hirude)
Voiced by: Akemi Kanda

==== Dri Tenkai ====
Lennus (女高天帝レナス, Jōkōtentei Renasu)
Voiced by: Aya Hisakawa
Nasha (天上女神ナシャ, Tenjō Megami Nasha)
Voiced by: Ayaka Fukuhara
Aviel (鉄槌神アヴィエル, Tettsuishin Avieru)
Voiced by: Yūki Tai

One main rival of 2nd arc.

Pocket (手芸少女ポケット, Shugei Shojō Poketto)
Voiced by: Hiromi Konno
Amunze, the Scythe of Thousand Blade (千刃鎌アムンゼ, Senbagama Amunze)
Voiced by: Naomi Ōzora
Cosmos (水晶聖女コスモス, Suishō Seijo Kosumosu)
Voiced by: Yukari Gotō

==== Dri Makai ====
Desmenos (冥界王デスメノス, Meikaiō Desumenosu)
Voiced by: Katsuyuki Konishi
Helmerek (獄炎王子ヘルメレク, Gokuenōji Herumereku)
Voiced by: Tsuyoshi Aoki
Aynsie (邪精神エインシー, Jaseishin Einshī)
Voiced by: Risa Hayamizu
Seado, the Evil God Knight (邪神騎セアド, Jashinki Seado)
Voiced by: Daisuke Sakaguchi

One main rival of 2nd arc.

Adelia (魔族姫騎アデリア, Mazokukiki Aderia)
Voiced by: Ai Sasaki

==== Other ====
Helix (エリクス, Erikusu)
Voiced by: Yasuhiro Takato

==== Antagonists ====
Gort (ゴード)
Voiced by: Hidekatsu Shibata, Shinsuke Nishi (true form)

The main antagonist of 1st arc, he is the user of darkness, but after his rebirth, he acquired the power of light. Before falling into darkness, he was puppet using hunter who possessed no element. When his village fell to a plague, he gathered herbs but he was too late to save anyone. He traveled around villages trying to help them but could only witness the tragedy that occurred. He fell into despair over the twisted world.

Dr. Puller (Dr.プラー)
Voiced by: Hiro Yūki
Dior (光貴公神ディオル, Kōkikōshin Dioru)/Monster Dior (魔獣ディオル, Majū Dioru)
Voiced by: Akira Ishida

The main antagonist of 2nd arc.

== Opening ==
- First series: "Together ~Tanken Driland~! (Together ～探検ドリランド～!)" by Sakura
- Sennen no Mahō - 1st arc: "Go ahead!" by Hideyuki Takahashi
- Sennen no Mahō - 2nd arc: "Go ahead! 〜SSR〜" by Hideyuki Takahashi and Sakura with Mekki & Shakki

== Ending ==
=== First series ===
1. "DRAGON BOY" by Civilian Skunk
2. "Nagareboshi" by 96Neko
3. "BUNBUN NINE9'" by Cheeky Parade

=== Sennen no Mahō ===
1. "STEP & GO" by PASSPO☆
2. "BLESSING CARD" by VALSHE
3. "JUVENILE!!!!" by Hanae
4. "you can do it!" by Suzu
