= Yes! PreCure 5 =

Japanese anime television series

- Cover of the first DVD volume by Marvelous Entertainment. From bottom clockwise: Cure Dream, Coco, Cure Rouge, Cure Mint, Cure Aqua, Cure Lemonade, and Natts.

Yes!プリキュア5
- Genre: Magical girl
- Created by: Izumi Todo
- Anime television series
- Directed by: Toshiaki Komura
- Produced by: Kazuhiro Asō (ADK); Masayuki Kameda (ABC); Takashi Washio (Toei)
- Written by: Yoshimi Narita
- Music by: Naoki Satō
- Studio: Toei Animation
- Licensed by: Crunchyroll
- Original network: ANN (ABC, TV Asahi)
- Original run: February 4, 2007 – January 27, 2008
- Episodes: 49
- Manga
- Written by: Izumi Todo
- Illustrated by: Futago Kamikita
- Published by: Kodansha
- Magazine: Nakayoshi
- Original run: March 2007 – February 2008
- Video game
- Developer: Namco Bandai Games
- Publisher: Namco Bandai Games
- Genre: Side-scrolling beat 'em up
- Platform: Nintendo DS
- Released: November 29, 2007
- Anime film

Yes! PreCure 5 the Movie: Great Miraculous Adventure in the Mirror Kingdom!
- Studio: Toei Animation
- Released: November 10, 2007
- Anime television series

Yes! PreCure 5 GoGo!
- Directed by: Toshiaki Komura
- Written by: Yoshimi Narita
- Music by: Naoki Satō
- Studio: Toei Animation
- Original network: ANN (ABC, TV Asahi)
- Original run: February 3, 2008 – January 25, 2009
- Episodes: 48
- Manga

Yes! PreCure 5 GoGo!
- Written by: Izumi Todo
- Illustrated by: Futago Kamikita
- Published by: Kodansha
- Magazine: Nakayoshi
- Original run: March 2008 – February 2009
- Video game

Yes! PreCure 5 Go Go: Let's Go Together! Dream Festival
- Developer: Bandai
- Publisher: Bandai
- Genre: Side-scrolling beat 'em up
- Platform: Nintendo DS
- Released: October 30, 2008
- Anime film

Yes PreCure 5 GoGo! the Movie: Happy Birthday in the Land of Sweets
- Directed by: Tatsuya Nagamine
- Written by: Yoshimi Narita
- Music by: Naoki Satō
- Studio: Toei Animation
- Released: November 8, 2008
- Anime television series
- Power of Hope: PreCure Full Bloom (2023)
- icon

Yes! PreCure 5 (YES! プリキュア5) is a Japanese anime television series produced by Toei Animation and the fourth installment in Izumi Todo's Pretty Cure metaseries, featuring the third generation of Cures. The anime aired on TV Asahi between February 2007 and January 2008. After the final episode of the initial series, a second season – Yes! PreCure 5 GoGo! (YES! プリキュア5 GoGo!) – which is the franchise's fifth installment, aired between February 2008 and January 2009, succeeding PreCure Splash Star time slot, and was succeeded by Fresh Pretty Cure!. Both series were directed by Toshiaki Komura and written by Yoshimi Narita. The character designs were done by Toshie Kawamura, who would go on to work on the character designs for Smile PreCure! and Hug! PreCure. An illustration book of her works was released on February 12, 2014. A manga adaptation was serialized in Kodansha's monthly Nakayoshi magazine. The series has dreams, hopes and butterflies as its main motif, while GoGo! has roses as its additional motif. A sequel anime focusing on the characters as adults premiered in October 2023.

== Story ==
=== Yes! PreCure 5 ===
The original series aired from February 4, 2007, to January 27, 2008, in Japan. Nozomi Yumehara, a regular middle school student, finds a magical book called the Dream Collet in her school's library and meets Coco, a fairy from the Palmier Kingdom who tells her that his friend Natts is trapped within the Collet. Nozomi decides to help restore the kingdom, which has been destroyed by an organization called Nightmare, by finding the 55 Pinkies to complete the Dream Collet and grant a wish. Her kind heart and resolve to help Coco proves she has the heart to be a Pretty Cure, and after receiving a Pinky Catch from a pink butterfly, she gains the power to transform into Cure Dream. To fight against Nightmare, who also seeks the Dream Collet for their own gain, she forms a team of four other students to be Pretty Cure. Together with Cure Rouge, Cure Lemonade, Cure Mint and Cure Aqua, they form the Yes Pretty Cure 5.

=== Yes! PreCure 5 GoGo! ===
The sequel season, Yes! PreCure 5 GoGo!, aired from February 3, 2008, to January 25, 2009. The Cure Rose Garden is a realm that has been watched over by its guardian Flora, who ensures that it remains concealed from the outside world. However Eternal, an art organization known for stealing treasure and artwork from other worlds, seeks to reach the Garden and seize the Rose Pact. To do this, they invade the Palmier Kingdom and its four surrounding kingdoms. Flora senses the approaching danger and sends a letter to the Pretty Cures, tasking them with finding the four rulers that have fled from their kingdoms, as they hold the Rose Garden Keys that unlock the path to the Garden. To carry out this mission, Nozomi and the others regain their ability to transform into Pretty Cure and are also joined by Milk, who through the blue rose has gained the ability to turn into a human named Kurumi Mimino and an alter ego called Milky Rose. They also gain a new ally in Syrup, a bird-like fairy who can assume a human form and works as a mailboy alongside Mailpo.

== Characters ==
=== Pretty Cures ===
Nozomi Yumehara (夢原 のぞみ, Yumehara Nozomi) / Cure Dream (キュアドリーム, Kyua Dorīmu)
Voiced by: Yūko Sanpei
The main protagonist. A 14/15-year-old second-year student at L'École des Cinq Lumières, Nozomi is reminiscent of a typical shōjo heroine. She lacks a vision for her life and did not have a dream until she met Coco and decided her dream is to help Coco save his kingdom. Although she is clumsy, easily distracted and carefree, her cheerful and optimistic demeanor earns her others' respect. She has a habit of saying "It's decided! (けって〜い！, Kettēi!)" when she decides on something. She becomes a Pretty Cure to fulfill the promise of Coco's dream, and in turn has a special bond with him. She introduces herself as "The great power of hope, Cure Dream!" (大いなる希望の力, キュアドリーム, Ōi naru kibō no chikara, Kyua Dorīmu)". As Cure Dream, she is the Cure of Hope and has the power of starlight. Her theme color is pink.
Rin Natsuki (夏木 りん, Natsuki Rin) / Cure Rouge (キュアルージュ, Kyua Rūju)
Voiced by: Junko Takeuchi
A 14/15-year-old second-year student at L'École des Cinq Lumières. She is tomboyish and loves to play sports, but has feminine interests such as a love of boys, and is scared of ghosts. She has a very straightforward and down-to-earth personality, which sharply contrasts with her childhood friend and classmate, Nozomi. Her parents run a flower shop called Natsuki Florist (Fleurist Natsuki), which she often helps out at while taking care of her younger sister and brother. Like Nozomi, she initially lacks a vision for her future, but becomes interested in jewelry design after working at the Natts House. She introduces herself as "The red flame of passion, Cure Rouge!" (情熱の赤い炎, キュアルージュ, Jōnetsu no akai honō, Kyua Rūju). As Cure Rouge, she is the Pretty Cure of Passion and has the power of fire. Her theme color is red.
Urara Kasugano (春日野 うらら, Kasugano Urara) / Cure Lemonade (キュアレモネード, Kyua Remonēdo)
Voiced by: Mariya Ise
A 13/14-year-old first-year transfer student at L'École des Cinq Lumières. Urara is half-Japanese on maternal side and half-French on paternal side. She aspires to be an actress like her mother, who was a famous actress before she died. As a result of her experiences, she has a mature and realistic personality, which has caused her to have few friends. She has a special bond with Syrup, similar to that of Nozomi and Coco, Komachi and Natts, and Karen and Milk. She introduces herself as "The effervescent scent of bursting lemon, Cure Lemonade!" (はじけるレモンの香り、キュアレモネード, Hajikeru remon no kaori, Kyua Remonēdo!). As Cure Lemonade, she is the Pretty Cure of Effervescence and has the power of light. Her theme color is yellow.
Komachi Akimoto (秋元 こまち, Akimoto Komachi) / Cure Mint (キュアミント, Kyua Minto)
Voiced by: Ai Nagano
A 15/16-year-old third-year student at L'École des Cinq Lumières. She is a kind and shy girl who aspires to be a writer and likes to read and write. However, once she is angered enough, she will snap and release her temper. She is a volunteer at the school library along with Karen, and often spends her time there writing stories. She has a special bond with Natts, that develops into romantic feelings. Her parents own a traditional Japanese sweetshop. She becomes a Pretty Cure upon acknowledging Nozomi's thoughts. She introduces herself as "The green earth of tranquility, Cure Mint!" (安らぎの緑の大地, キュアミント, Yasuragi no midori no daichi, Kyua Minto!). As Cure Mint, she is the Pretty Cure of Tranquility and has the power of earth. Her theme color is green.
Karen Minazuki (水無月 かれん, Minazuki Karen) / Cure Aqua (キュアアクア, Kyua Akua)
Voiced by: Ai Maeda
A 15/16-year-old third-year student at L'École des Cinq Lumières who is Komachi's classmate and best friend. She comes from an affluent family and is a member of the student council at L'École des Cinq Lumières. Her parents are musicians and often go on tour, and despite missing them she hasn't asked them to come home out of fear of disturbing their work, so despite her wealth and popularity, she is often lonely. Most students look up to her and see her as cool and inspiring. In the beginning, she is reluctant to become a Cure. In episode 5, the blue butterfly appears before her, but she cannot transform. In episode 6, as the girls are struggling, Karen stands up for her friends, vowing to protect them regardless of transformation. The blue butterfly reappears and successfully lands on her wrist, allowing her to transform into Cure Aqua. Like Nozomi and Komachi with Coco and Natts respectively, she has a special bond with Milk. She introduces herself as "The blue spring of intelligence, Cure Aqua!" (知性の青い噴水,キュアアクア, Chisei no aoki izumi, Kyua Akua!). As Cure Aqua, she is the Pretty Cure of Intelligence and has the power of water. Her theme color is blue.

=== Mascots ===
Coco (ココ, Koko) / Kōji Kokoda (小々田 コージ, Kokoda Kōji)
Voiced by: Takeshi Kusao
A fairy from the Palmier Kingdom who resembles a yellow-furred tail fox. He is searching for the Dream Collet to restore his kingdom. He can transform into a human, and later becomes a teacher at Nozomi's school to watch over her. Coincidentally, part of his human name, "Kokoda", sounds like the phrase "I'm Coco" in Japanese. Coco has expressed that he has feelings for Nozomi, but is hesitant to act on them because they will have to go their separate ways when his kingdom is restored. Cure Dream kisses him in Yes! Pretty Cure 5 GoGo!: Okashi no Kuni no Happy Birthday! to free him from brainwashing. Midway through the series, it is revealed that he and Natts are princes from separate parts of the Palmier Kingdom. He is given Palmier's crown in episode 24 of GoGo!, granting the Cures the Cure Fleurets. In episode 38 of GoGo!, he and Natts combine powers to allow Cure Dream and Milky Rose to combine powers.
Natts (ナッツ, Nattsu) / Natsu (夏さん, Natsu-san)
Voiced by: Miyu Irino
A fairy from the Palmier Kingdom who resembles a brown squirrel. Like Coco, he can transform into a human and works as the clerk of a jewelry shop called Natts House. Coco describes him as a good friend, comparable to the relationship between Nozomi and Rin. He has an aloof and cold personality and has difficulty trusting anyone because of his past, and so he did not trust Coco at first. In the beginning of the series, he is sealed within the Dream Collet and rescued in episode 7 after the five Cures receive their powers. Komachi exhibits romantic feelings for Natts, and despite his stoic behavior, it is clear that he feels a special bond with her. Some episodes of the series, as well as a set of character cards, give his human name as "Natts". However, this is generally accepted as Engrish. He is given Palmier's crown in episode 31 of GoGo!, allowing Milky Rose to use the Milky Mirror. In episode 38 of GoGo!, he and Coco combine powers to allow Cure Dream and Milky Rose to combine powers.
Milk (ミルク, Miruku) / Kurumi Mimino (美々野 くるみ, Mimino Kurumi) / Milky Rose (ミルキィローズ, Mirukī Rōzu)
Voiced by: Eri Sendai
A fairy who debuts in episode 21 of the original series and resembles a white-and-pink lop rabbit who is the royal speaker and chancellor-to-be of the Palmier Kingdom. Over the course of the series, Milk and Karen develop a close friendship, beginning when Karen sacrifices herself to protect her. Milk also admires Coco very much and is jealous as Nozomi grows closer to him. She does not have a natural ability to take a human form like the princes do, but later gains it after picking up a seed of the blue rose in GoGo! and watering it until it grew. In her human form, her alias is 13-year-old Kurumi Mimino, who has long violet hair and fuchsia eyes and dresses in violet with blue flower decorations. Her name backwards has the same pronunciation as Miruku no Mimi (ミルクの耳), meaning "Milk's ears". At first, she enrolls into Nozomi's class and maintains a mysterious, calm, and cool persona to conceal her identity from the princes as well as Pretty Cures. However, her secret is eventually blown because she cannot maintain this form after battles.
After gaining human form, Milk is able to transform into the heroine Milky Rose. She introduces herself as "The blue rose is the mark of secrets, Milky Rose!" (青いバラは秘密の印、ミルキィローズ!, Aoi Bara wa Himitsu no Shirushi, Mirukī Rōzu!) In her fairy form, Her theme color is pastel pink. Her theme color is purple.
Syrup (シロップ, Shiroppu) / Shirō Amai (甘井 シロー, Amai Shirō)
Voiced by: Romi Park
A fairy who debuts in episode 1 of GoGo!. A tan feathered bird-like fairy that can assume both a human form and an aerial transport form, and works as a delivery-boy with Mailpo. He once worked for Eternal because he sought something in the Cure Rose Garden and needed a way to get there. While working for Eternal, he was asked to deliver a letter from Eternal's boss to Flora. Eventually, he quit Eternal for unknown reasons. When he was younger, he worked in the Cure Rose Garden and met Flora. Syrup has amnesia and has forgotten who he is, and wants to find the Cure Rose Garden so he can regain his memories. He develops a bond with Urara like the ones between Nozomi and Coco, Komachi and Natts, and Karen and Milk.
Mailpo (メルポ, Merupo)
Voiced by: Wasabi Mizuta
A walking pink mailbox that works with Syrup and helps him with sending and receiving letters. In the final episode of GoGo!, she is said to be the red rose that Syrup planted in the Cure Rose Garden, but that she disguises herself as a mailbox to be with Syrup.

=== Villains ===
==== Nightmare ====
Nightmare (ナイトメア, Naitomea) is an evil organization and the main villains of the first series. They seek the Dream Collet to make a wish and bring despair to the world.

Desparaia (デスパライア, Desuparaia)
Voiced by: Kazuko Sugiyama
The head of Nightmare and the main antagonist of the original series. She intends to gain eternal life to bring despair to the world, and has ordered her subordinates to obtain the Dream Collet.
Kawarino (カワリーノ, Kawarīno)
Voiced by: Hiro Yuki
Desparaia's secretary, who conveys her intentions and orders to the other members of Nightmare, who generally fear him, and reports to her on missions. As a human, he has blue hair and wears a suit. He is based on a chameleon and often uses his mimicking abilities to deceive others. His name is derived from the Japanese word kawaru, meaning change.
Bunbee (ブンビー, Bunbī)
Voiced by: Wataru Takagi
The boss of Girinma, Gamao and Arachnea. As a human, he has blonde hair and wears a suit, and can transform into a form resembling a bee. For the first part of the series, he was believed to be leading the members of Nightmare, but it is soon revealed that he takes orders from Kawarino. He joins Eternal in GoGo! after surviving a somehow fatal fall near the end of the original series, but eventually joins the Cures' side.
Girinma (ギリンマ)
Voiced by: Nobuyuki Hiyama
The first member of Nightmare to appear. As a human, he wears a hat and glasses and carries a cane, and can transform into a form resembling a praying mantis. He greatly fears his superiors, especially Bunbee.
Gamao (ガマオ)
Voiced by: Akio Suyama
A large man who, as a human, resembles a hobo and can transform into a form resembling a toad. He is lazy and often refuses to work, even if his survival as a member of Nightmare depends on it. His name is derived from the Japanese word "gama", meaning "toad".
Arachnea (アラクネア, Arakunea)
Voiced by: Yoko Soumi
The lone woman of the team, who is reminiscent of Poisony from Pretty Cure. As a human, she has short light purple hair and wears a red office dress. She can transform into a form resembling a spider. Several episodes featuring her have her fight the girls in the sewers. Her name is derived from the Greek word "arachne", meaning "spider".
Hadenya (ハデーニャ, Hadēnya)
Voiced by: Kazue Komiya
A villain who appears in the second part of the season. As a human, she wears a red jacket and blue pants, as well as jewelry. She can transform into a form resembling a chicken who wears a colorful costume reminiscent of Brazil's carnival costumes. She likes to take what she wants and often has Bunbee serve her.
Bloody (ブラッディ, Buraddi)
Voiced by: Eiji Maruyama
The last Nightmare member to appear in the first season. As a human, he wears a hat and a purple and black outfit with a cape. He can transform into a form resembling a bat, and in this form he has the power to fire sonic waves at his enemies. Despite this, he usually tries to win through persuasion and talking, only using Kowaina to help him. He also transforms rooms or places into Kowaina rather than objects.
Kowaina (コワイナー, Kowainā)
Voiced by: Chihiro Sakurai
A mask that can be placed onto inanimate objects to bring them to life and cause destruction. The villains often use them as both a method of offense and defense. Their name is derived from the Japanese adjective, kowai, which means "frightening".

==== Eternal ====
Eternal (エターナル, Etānaru) is an evil art organization that is the main villain of GoGo!. They steal art and treasure from other worlds, and are searching for the Cure Rose Garden.

Director (館長, Kanchō)
Voiced by: Shigeru Chiba
The ruler of Eternal and the main antagonist of Go!Go!. He is a tall man who wears maroon and black robes and a silver helm on his head. He was responsible for the destruction of the four kingdoms of Palmier and seeks to reach the Cure Rose Garden to gain eternal life. He had previously fallen in love with Flora, but was later banished and turned to evil out of spite.
Anacondy (アナコンディ, Anakondi)
Voiced by: Kaori Yamagata
She is a strict middle-aged woman with purple hair resembling a Gorgon: like them, she has the ability to turn people to stone. She's like an administrator among Eternal, directing its members and controlling rare objects they bring her. She also claims report papers from her members and is very strict to them. She is very dedicated to the Director and seemingly does everything for him. She was responsible for erasing Syrup's memories as he was delivering a letter from Flora to the Director. Her true form is revealed in episode 46, where she attacks the Cures and turns them to stone.
Scorp (スコルプ, Sukorupu)
Voiced by: Takehito Koyasu
Scorp is the first member of Eternal to appear in the series, who seems to be knowledgeable about Syrup and his circumstances. When fighting, he transforms into a form resembling a scorpion. Despite them not getting along well at first, he gradually befriends Bunbee. He last appeared in episode 11. Scorp is also the final boss of the game, having the ability to transform into a giant scorpion-like monster.
Nebatakos (ネバタコス, Nebatakosu)
Voiced by: Bin Shimada
Not counting Bunbee, he is the third member of Eternal. His name is derived from the Japanese word "tako", meaning "octopus", and he transforms into a form resembling one. He dislikes rules and often argues with Anacondy. He last appeared in episode 24.
Yadokhan and Isōgin (ヤドカーンとイソーギン, Yadokān to Isōgin)
Voiced by: Kenji Nomura (Yadokhan), Chō (Isōgin)
Eternal's "nightmare-duo", who are known as their best hunters. The small and fat Yadokhan mainly does the talking, although he is short of words, while the tall Isohgin repeats what Yadohkan says. The two can transform into a hermit crab/sea anemone monster. They last appeared in episode 38.
Shibiretta (シビレッタ, Shibiretta)
Voiced by: Reiko Suzuki
An old woman who wears a mushroom on her head and uses a book to manipulate fairy tales, pulling the Cures into worlds based on fairy tales to attack them using Hoshiina. Her name is derived from Hikageshibiretake, a type of mushroom found in Japan. She dislikes Anacondy, and they have mutual hatred for one another. She last appeared in episode 42.
Mucardia (ムカーディア, Mukādia)
Voiced by: Ryōtarō Okiayu
The last member of Eternal to appear in the second season, who uses his good looks to infiltrate the Pretty Cure and gather information about them. He pretends to be a magician named Kyousuke Momoi (百井京介, Momoi Kyōsuke) while disguised. His name is derived from the Japanese word "mukade", meaning centipede, and in episode 41, his true form is revealed to resemble one.
Hoshiina (ホシイナー, Hoshiinā)
Voiced by: Shinya Fukumatsu
The Hoshiina are monsters summoned by throwing a yellow ball onto objects. The name is derived from hoshii, which means "to want or desire".

=== Cure Rose Garden ===
Flora (フローラ, Furōra)
Voiced by: Yūko Minaguchi
A mysterious lady with long pink hair who guards the Cure Rose Garden and protects it from the outside world. The boss of Eternal is interested in her, having previously been in love with her. In the final episode of Go!Go!, she reveals to Syrup that she wanted him to befriend the Cures, which is why she requested he send her letter to Nozomi. She later dies, but entrusts Nozomi with the role of the Garden's protector and the Cures with a seed.

=== Four Rulers ===
The rulers of the Palmier Kingdom's four neighboring kingdoms, who hold the Rose Garden Keys and were targeted by Eternal as a result. Once a ruler is found, he or she must stay in the Rose Pact for some time to recover, after which they can go back and restore their kingdom. Each have a special power that benefits themselves and the team, and can communicate with each other using their crowns. Together, all four and their Keys open the door to the Cure Rose Garden.

King Doughnuts (ドーナツ国王, Donatsu Kokuō)
Voiced by: Yasunori Matsumoto
The first ruler. He is a small blue dragon and the ruler of the Doughnut Kingdom, which is east of Palmier. He is dignified, smart, and arrogant, and appreciates people who work hard for others. He can stun the enemy with a blue light emitting from his hands. In episode 14, he gives the Cures his calling card before returning to his kingdom.
Queen Bavarois (パパロア女王, Babaroa Joō)
Voiced by: Mari Adachi
The second ruler. She is a pink-and-red colored bird who is the Queen of the Bavarois Kingdom, which is south of Palmier. She is sociable and energetic, but her talkative nature can cause problems for others. Her power allows communication between the Pretty Cure by enabling their transformation items to act as mobile phones. In episode 25, she gives the Cures her calling card before returning to her kingdom.
Princess Crepe (クレープ王女, Kurēpu Ōjo)
Voiced by: Kumiko Nishihara
The third ruler. She is a lemon chiffon orange striped tiger who is the Queen of the Crêpe Kingdom, which is west of Palmier. She is in love with Coco and claims to be his fiancee, and hopes that her marriage to him will unify both kingdoms. Her power activates the Milky Note, a laptop. In episode 34, she gives her calling card to the Cures before returning to her kingdom, and remains friends with Coco even after he rejects her confessiom.
King Mont Blanc (モンブラン国王, Monburan Kokuō)
Voiced by: Sakiko Tamagawa
The fourth ruler. He is a green and tan turtle who is the King of the Mont Blanc Kingdom, which is to the north of Palmier. He is the oldest of the four rulers and the most intelligent, as he knows of the connection between Flora and Syrup and may know of the connection between Eternal and the Cure Rose Garden.

=== Cures' families ===
Megumi Yumehara (夢原 恵美, Yumehara Megumi)
Voiced by: Yurika Hino
Nozomi's mother who is a beautician and runs a beauty shop called Espoir (French for "hope"). She and Kazuyo are childhood friends, similar to Nozomi and Rin. Kazuyo says that she was more clumsy than Nozomi.
Tsutomu Yumehara (夢原 勉, Yumehara Tsutomu)
Voiced by: Satoshi Taki
Nozomi's friendly father who is a children's artist.
Kazuyo Natsuki (夏木 和代, Natsuki Kazuyo)
Voiced by: Mayumi Asano
Rin's mother who runs a flower shop called Fleuriste Natsuki alongside her husband. She is called "Kazu-chan" by Megumi, similar to how Nozomi calls Rin "Rin-chan".
Yū Natsuki (夏木 ゆう, Natsuki Yū) and Ai Natsuki (夏木 あい, Natsuki Ai)
Voiced by: Kumiko Watanabe (Yu) and Satsuki Yukino (Ai)
Rin's younger twin siblings who often bother her. Yū is a boy and Ai is a girl.
Maria Kasugano (春日野マリア, Kasugano Maria)
Urara's late mother and Michel's late wife. She was a stage actress, and died when Urara was young.
Michel Kasugano (春日野 ミシェル, Kasugano Misheru)
Voiced by: Jun'ichi Kanemaru
Urara's father and Maria's husband, a French man who has lived in Japan for 20 years.
Heizou Kasugano (春日野 平蔵, Kasugano Heizō)
Voiced by: Hiroshi Naka
Urara's grandfather and Maria's father.
Madoka Akimoto (秋元 まどか, Akimoto Madoka)
Voiced by: Ai Nagano
Komachi's older sister. She is a biker who likes to travel. As a college student, Madoka is often away from home.
Sakamoto (坂本)
Voiced by: Tomoaki Ikeda
He is the Minazuki family's butler and takes care of Karen when her parents are away. He is very respectful to her and calls her 'ojou-sama' ("young lady"), but also seems to be fond of her, like a father.

=== L'École des Cinq Lumières ===
L'École des Cinq Lumières (サンクルミエール学園, Sankurumiēru Gakuen) is the junior high school the Cures attend.

Kaori Konno (今野 香織, Konno Kaori)
Voiced by: Kumiko Ito
The captain of the football club and Miho's friend who appears in episode 13.
Miho Saito (斉藤 美穂, Saitō Miho), Eri Nakazawa (中沢 絵理, Nakazawa Eri), and Aki Yamamoto (山本 亜紀, Yamamoto Aki)
Voiced by: Yukiko Hanioka (Miho), Ami Michizoe (Eri), and Kanae Oki (Aki)
Three members of the football club.
Mika Masuko (増子 美香, Masuko Mika)
Voiced by: Mari Yamada
A second-year student who is the chief editor of the Cinq Lumières Tsūshin (a school paper). She tends to appropriate the paper for herself. Her name is a pun on masukomi, meaning "mass communication". Mika almost gets a "scoop" on the Pretty Cures, but is distracted by Natts' human form, and as a result focuses the next day's paper on him, reducing the article on the Cures to a small, almost unreadable size.
Yoshimi Morita (森田 よしみ, Morita Yoshimi)
Voiced by: Yuri Amano
A close friend of Urara.
Mayu Kudō (工藤 真由, Kudō Mayu) and Kanako Miyamoto (宮本 佳那子, Miyamoto Kanako)
Voiced by: Mayu Kudō and Kanako Miyamoto
Fictionalized versions of Mayu and Kanako, who appear as performers in a stage play.
Otaka (おタカさん, Otakasan)
Voiced by: Chie Koujiro
The mistress of the cafeteria where the girls gather and eat lunch. She is a cheerful middle-aged woman who sometimes gives them good advice. In truth, she is secretly the principal of the school and uses another identity to be able to receive advice from students like she did when she was an intern teacher.

== Media ==
=== Television series ===
Both series were directed by Toshiaki Komura. Yes! PreCure 5 in Japan on Asahi Broadcasting Corporation and other ANN stations between February 4, 2007, and January 27, 2008. GoGo! aired between February 3, 2008, to January 25, 2009. Both series has four pieces of theme music: two opening and two ending themes.

The opening theme for Yes! PreCure 5 is "PreCure 5, Smile Go Go!" (プリキュア5、スマイル go go!) performed by Mayu Kudo with the chorus performed by Young Fresh with Mayumi Gojo. The ending theme until Episode 32 "Kira-kira Shichatte My True Love!" (キラキラしちゃってMy True Love!; "Sparkling My True Love!") performed by Kanako Miyamoto. For the final 18 episodes, the ending theme was changed to "Ganbalance de Dance: Yumemiru Kiseki-tachi" (ガンバランス de ダンス～夢みる奇跡たち～, Ganbaransu de Dansu: Yumemiru Kiseki-tachi; lit. 'Ganbalance Dance: Dreaming Miracles'), performed by Miyamoto with the PreCure 5. This song was also used as the theme for the film adaptation Great Miraculous Adventure in the Mirror Kingdom!. An insert song in the series titled "Tobikkiri! Yūki no Door" (とびっきり!勇気の扉（ドア）, Tobikkiri! Yūki no Doa; "Extraordinary! The Door of Courage") was performed by Mariya Ise as her character Urara Kasugano and was used in episodes 20 and 29.

The opening theme for GoGo! is "PreCure 5, Full Throttle Go Go!" (プリキュア5、フル·スロットルGO GO!), performed by Kudou. The first ending theme, used for the first 29 episodes, is "Te to Te Tsunai de Heart mo Link!!" (手と手つないでハートもリンク!!, Te to Te Tsunai de Hāto mo Rinku!!; "From Hand to Hand, the Heart Also Links!!") performed by Miyamoto with Young Fresh. The second ending "Ganbalance de Dance: Kibō no Relay" (ガンバランス de ダンス～希望のリレー～, Ganbalance de Dance ~Kibō no Rirē~; "Ganbalance de Dance: Relay of Hope) was used for the remaining 19 episodes of the series, and performed by the Cure Quartet, comprising Ise, Uechiyae, Kudou, and Miyamoto. Two insert songs were also used in the series, the first being "Twintail no Mahō" (ツイン・テールの魔法, Tsuin Tēru no Mahō; lit. 'Magic of the Twintail') by Ise as Urara Kasugano in episodes 18 and 37, and the other "Ashita, Hana Saku. Egao, Saku." (明日、花咲く。笑顔、咲く。; lit. 'Tomorrow, the Flower Blooms. The Smile Blooms.') by the Cure Quartet, sung right before the ending theme played on episode 48.

A sequel anime titled Power of Hope: PreCure Full Bloom (キボウノチカラ〜オトナプリキュア'23〜, Kibō no Chikara: Otona Purikyua '23; lit. 'Power of Hope: The Grown-up Pretty Cure '23'), was announced on March 13, 2023. The series is produced by Toei Animation and Studio Deen and directed by Takayuki Hamana, with Yoshimi Narita returning for series composition, Atsuko Nakajima in charge of character designs, and Naoki Satō returning to compose the music. It premiered on October 7, 2023, on NHK Educational TV. Ikimonogakari will perform the opening theme song "Tokimeki" (ときめき; lit. 'Heart-Throbbing'). Crunchyroll began streaming the series on October 7, 2023, in North America, Central and South America, the Caribbean, Brazil, South Africa, Australia and New Zealand.

Preceded by PreCure Splash Star	Yes! PreCure 5; 2007–2009	Succeeded by Fresh PreCure!
