= Kanako Miyamoto =

Japanese voice actress

- 宮本 佳那子
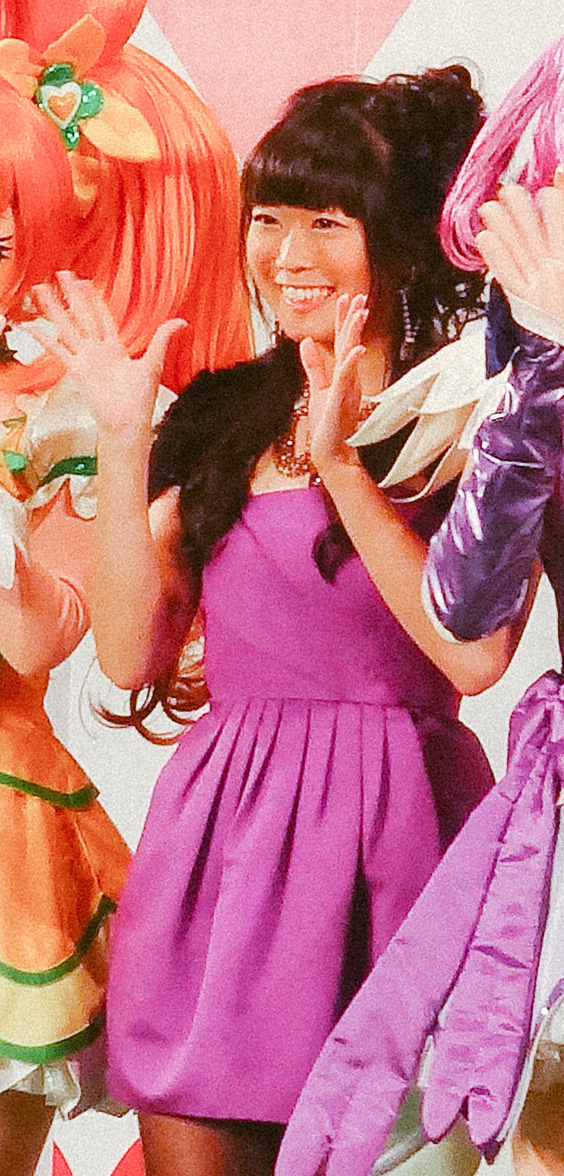
- Kanako Miyamoto at Tokyo International Film Festival in 2013
- Born: November 4, 1989 (age 36); Tsuchiura, Ibaraki Prefecture, Japan
- Occupations: Actress; voice actress; singer
- Years active: 2000–present
- Agent: Axlone
- Notable work: DokiDoki! PreCure as Cure Sword
- Height: 155 cm (5 ft 1 in)
- Spouse: Unknown (m. 2019)
- Children: 1

Kanako Miyamoto (宮本 佳那子, Miyamoto Kanako; born November 4, 1989) is a Japanese actress and singer. She is known for voicing Makoto Kenzaki/Cure Sword from DokiDoki! PreCure and as the singer of several songs in the Pretty Cure series.

== Biography ==
Kanako Miyamoto was born on November 4, 1989, in Ibaraki Prefecture.

She was a member of the Cure Rainbows who performed Arigatō ga Ippai, the ending song of Pretty Cure All Stars DX3: Deliver the Future! The Rainbow-Colored Flower That Connects the World. In 2013, she voiced Cure Sword (Makoto Kenzaki) in DokiDoki! PreCure. She reprised her role as Cure Sword in the Hugtto! PreCure Futari wa Pretty Cure: All Stars Memories crossover film.

She also performed both ending songs of Kirakira PreCure a la Mode and she and Yuri Komagata, who also sang that show's opening theme song, both make cameo appearances as a pair of people auditioning for an in-universe television show alongside Himari Arisugawa/Cure Custard in the 43rd episode, which aired on 10 December 2017. She also performed the opening song of Hug! Pretty Cure.

== Personal life ==
She has level four certification from the National Riding Club Association of Japan.

Miyamoto announced her marriage to a non-celebrity husband on February 11, 2019, and on July 16, 2020, she announced the birth of their first child.

== Filmography ==
=== Anime ===
2007

- Yes! PreCure 5, Herself

2009

- Anyamaru Tantei Kiruminzuu, Kasumi Miyabe

2010

- Cookin Idol Ai! My! My! Main!, Reira Himenokōji

2011

- Last Exile: Fam, The Silver Wing, Rene Collette
- Anyway! Anpanman, Nekomi and Napolitan Roll
- Tamayura: Hitotose, Kou Sawatari
- Ojarumaru, Tomoe, Imoko and Mitsuko
- Mai no Mahō to Katei no Hi, Mai Rikkai

2012

- Blast of Tempest, Miki
- Eureka Seven: AO, Arata Naru
- Tanken Driland, Princess Mikoto
- Toriko, Girl (ep.87), Boy (ep.88).

2013

- Aikatsu!, Noel Otoshiro (ep.53-65)
- Bakumatsu Gijinden Roman, Orin, Ikushima
- DokiDoki! PreCure, Makoto Kenzaki/Cure Sword
- Lupin III: Princess of the Breeze - Hidden City in the Sky, Rasha
- Mangirl!, Hana Sasayama
- Tamayura: More Aggressive, Kou Sawatari
- Tanken Driland: Sennen no Mahō, Princess Mikoto, Jackie
- Red Data Girl, Ayumi Watanabe
- Picchipichi Shizuku-chan, Rose

2014

- HappinessCharge PreCure!, Makoto Kenzaki/Cure Sword
- Robot Girls Z, Glossom X2

2016

- Kinder TV, Kinder-chan, Kanta, herself

2017

- Digimon Universe: Appli Monsters, Hatsumi
- Princess Principal, Rita
- Kirakira Pretty Cure a la Mode, Kanako
- Yo-kai Watch, Ufun Violet

2018

- Hanebado!, Sasashita Miki
- SSSS.GRIDMAN, Furuma

2020

- Magia Record, Black Feather (ep.6)
- Ascendance of a Bookworm, Rico

2023

- Mo Dao Zu Shi (Final Chapter), child

2025

- Ugoku! Neko Mukashibanashi, Mikeneko

2026

- Yomi no Tsugai, Mayu Nakagami

=== Film ===
2007

- Yes! PreCure 5 the Movie: Great Miraculous Adventure in the Mirror Kingdom!, Pinky

2012

- Fuse Teppō Musume no Torimonochō, Meido

2013

- Pretty Cure All Stars New Stage 2: Friends of the Heart, Makoto Kenzaki/Cure Sword
- DokiDoki! Precure the Movie: Mana's Getting Married!!? The Dress of Hope that Connects to the Future, Makoto Kenzaki/Cure Sword

2014

- Pretty Cure All Stars New Stage 3: Eternal Friends, Makoto Kenzaki/Cure Sword

2015

- Pretty Cure All Stars: Spring Carnival♪, Makoto Kenzaki/Cure Sword
- Tamayura: Sotsugyō Shashin, Kou Sawatari

2016

- Pretty Cure All Stars: Singing with Everyone♪ Miraculous Magic!, Makoto Kenzaki/Cure Sword

2018

- Hug! Pretty Cure Futari wa Pretty Cure: All Stars Memories, Makoto Kenzaki/Cure Sword

=== Video games ===
2010

- God Eater, Player's Voice

2016

- Grimms Notes, Marie Antoinette, Chaos Marie

== Discography ==
=== Albums ===
List of albums, with selected chart positions
| Title | Year | Album details | Peak chart positions | |
| Title | Year | Album details | JPN Oricon | JPN Hot |
|---|---|---|---|---|
| Kirakirashichatte My True Love! (キラキラしちゃって My True Love!) (B-side) | 2007 | Released: 7 March 2007; Label: Marvelous AQL | 37 | |
| Ganbalance de Dance: Yumemiru Kiseki-tachi (ガンバランスdeダンス～夢みる奇跡たち～) | 2007 | Released: 3 October 2007; Label: Marvelous AQL | 59 | |
| Hatara Kizzu Maihamu Gumi (はたらキッズ マイハム組) (alongside Maihamu Gumi) | 2007 | Released: 19 December 2007; Label: Nippon Columbia | — | |
| Thank you! wa I LOVE YOU (サンキュ!は I LOVE YOU) (alongside mao) | 2009 | Released: 22 April 2009; Label: Nippon Columbia | — | |
| Picchipichi♪Shizuku-chan!! (ぴっちぴち♪しずくちゃん!!) (alongside Young Fresh) | 2013 | Released: 20 February 2013; Label: Nippon Columbia | — | |
| Te to te tsunaide Heart mo Link!! (手と手つないでハートもリンク!!) (B-side) | 2008 | Released: 2 February 2008; Label: Marvelous | 24 | |
| Go ahead!～SSR～ (Go ahead!～SSR～) (as Jackie) | 2013 | Released: 20 November 2013; Label: Nippon Columbia | — | |
| Let's La Cooking Showtime (レッツ・ラ・クッキン☆ショータイム) (B-side) | 2017 | Released: 1 March 2017; Label: Marvelous | 18 | |
| Shubidubi Sweets Time (シュビドゥビ☆スイーツタイム) (A-side) | 2017 | Released: 3 July 2017; Label: Marvelous | 24 | |
| Tres Biensemble (レビアンサンブル!!) (B-side, duet with Yuri Komagata) | 2017 | Released: 25 October 2017; Label: Marvelous | 59 | |
| We can!! Hugtto! PreCure (We can!! HUGっと!プリキュア) (A-side) | 2018 | Released: 7 March 2018; Label: Marvelous | 25 | |
| Nanairo no Sekai (七色の世界) | 2018 | Released: 14 March 2018; Label: Marvelous | 65 | |
| Rewind Memory (リワインドメモリー) (alongside Mayumi Gojo) | 2018 | Released: 24 October 2018; Label: Marvelous | 35 | |
| PreCure! Kana Yell☆Miracle (プリキュア!カナYell☆ミラクル) | 2019 | Released: 13 March 2019; Label: Marvelous | 55 | |
"—" denotes releases that did not chart The information about each release is in the attached Oricon source

=== Albums ===
List of albums, with selected chart positions
| Title | Year | Album details | Peak chart positions | |
| Title | Year | Album details | JPN Oricon | JPN Hot |
|---|---|---|---|---|
| DokiDoki! PreCure Character Album: Songbird (ドキドキ!プリキュア キャラクターアルバム～SONGBIRD～) | 2013 | Released: 29 May 2013; Label: Marvelous AQL | 40 | |
| Arigatō no Uta (ありがとうのうた) | 2014 | Released: 12 February 2014; Label: Nippon Columbia | — | |
| Dear my past self (Dear my past self) | 2018 | Released: 8 August 2018; Label: Marvelous | 96 | |
"—" denotes releases that did not chart The information about each release is in the attached Oricon source
