= Mayumi Gojo =

Japanese singer from Ibaraki Prefecture (born 1972)

Mayumi Gojo 五條 真由美
- Born: February 12, 1972 (age 54)
- Origin: Ibaraki Prefecture, Japan
- Genres: J-Pop; anison
- Occupation: Singer
- Years active: 1999–present
- Labels: Marvelous Entertainment; Nippon Columbia
- Member of: Project.R
- Website: gojomayumi.com

Mayumi Gojo (五條 真由美, Gojō Mayumi; born February 12, 1972) is a Japanese singer from Ibaraki Prefecture. She formerly worked under Hyper Voice Managements. Currently she is affiliated with the Love&Light talent management agency. Gojo is known for her theme song performances for anime series such as Ojamajo Doremi, Pretty Cure, and Yumeiro Patissiere. She has performed as part of Project.R and also provides backup chorus for other artists.

== Biography ==
Gojo held a normal office job after graduating university. However she soon quit because she wanted a music-related job, and subsequently enrolled to a voice training class. She started out as a backup singer for J-pop artists. She was introduced by her voice trainer to the late Miki Matsubara, who offered her to sing an insert song for the 1999 anime series Ojamajo Doremi. It became her debut song "Mahou de Choi^{2}" and she went on to record several more songs for the series.

In 2004, she performed the opening theme for the first Pretty Cure series "Danzen! Futari wa Pretty Cure", one of her best known songs. The song was awarded the Radio Kansai Award for best theme song at the 9th Animation Kobe Awards that year.

She released her first original album Iridescent in 2005 under an independent label. It was re-released by Marvelous Entertainment in 2007 with three new additional tracks as Iridescent+. That same year she also released Mayumi Gojo Vocal Best from Futari wa PreCure, a compilation of her Pretty Cure songs.

In 2008, she joined Project.R to sing for the Super Sentai Series.

== Discography ==
=== Singles ===
- "Natsu no Mahou" (Split single with Maho-dou, released July 4, 2001)
  - "Kaeru ga Hitotsu Nakya" (Mo~tto! Ojamajo Doremi: Kaeru Ishi no Himitsu insert song, performed by Maho-dou with Mayumi Gojo)
- Usagi-chan de Cue!! theme song single (Released November 9, 2001)
  - "Mou Ichido Energy" (opening theme)
- NHK Hitori de Dekirumon! Dokodemo Cooking theme song single (Released July 21, 2004)
  - "Hanjuku Columbus" (opening theme)
- "Danzen! Futari wa Pretty Cure" (Released March 24, 2004, Re-released September 24, 2004)
  - Futari wa Pretty Cure opening theme
  - coupled with "Gecchuu! Raburabuu?!" (ending theme)
- "Danzen! Futari wa PreCure Ver.Max Heart" (Released February 25, 2005)
  - Futari wa Pretty Cure Max Heart opening theme
  - coupled with "Murimuri!? Ariari!! IN jaa na~i?!" (ending theme, performed with Young Fresh)
- "Kokoro no Chikara" (Split single with Shizuka Kudo, released May 25, 2005)
  - "Kibou no Namida: Tears for Tomorrow" (Futari wa PreCure Max Heart: The Movie insert song)
- "Wonder Winter Yattaa!!" (Released November 23, 2005)
  - Futari wa Pretty Cure Max Heart 2nd ending theme
  - coupled with "Kogarashi no Ding Dong"
- "Gag 100kaibun Aishite Kudasai" (Split single with Berryz Kobo, released November 23, 2005)
  - "Crystal" (Futari wa Pretty Cure Max Heart 2: Yukizora no Tomodachi insert song)
- "Makasete Splash Star" (Split single with Yuka Uchiyae with Splash Stars, released February 22, 2006)
  - "'Warau ga Kachi!" de GO!' (Futari wa Pretty Cure Splash Star ending theme)
- "Ganbalance de Dance" (Released October 4, 2006)
  - Futari wa PreCure Splash Star 2nd ending theme, performed with Kappei Yamaguchi and Miyu Matsuki *coupled with "Pa!tto Harebare Jan♪" (performed with Orie Kimoto, Atsuko Enomoto and Yuka Uchiyae)
- "Engine Second Rap: Turbo Custon" (Project.R single, released July 2, 2008)
  - Engine Sentai Go-onger ending theme, performed by Project.R with Engine Kids
  - coupled with "Take Off! Go-on Wings" (insert song, performed as part of Project.R with Takayoshi Tanimoto)
- Engine Oasobi CD Book (Project.R single, released July 30, 2008)
  - "Engine Third Rap: Aero-Dynamic Custom" (Engine Sentai Go-onger ending theme, performed by Project.R with Engine Kids)
- "Ganbalance de Dance: Kibou no Relay" (Cure Quartet (Mayumi Gojo, Yuka Uchiyae, Mayu Kudo and Kanako Miyamoto) single, released September 10, 2008)
  - Yes! PreCure 5 GoGo! 2nd ending theme
  - coupled with "PreCure Mode ni Switch On!"
- PreCure All Stars DX: Minna to Tomodachi Kiseki no Zenin Daishuugou! theme song single (Released March 18, 2009)
  - "Kirakira kawaii! PreCure Daishuugou♪" (opening theme, performed with Cure Deluxe (Mayumi Gojo, Yuka Uchiyae, Mayu Kudo, Kanako Miyamoto, Mizuki Moie and Momoko Hayashi))
  - "PreCure, Kiseki Deluxe" (ending theme, performed by Mayu Kudo with Cure Deluxe)
- "Justice of Light" (Released November 18, 2009)
  - The Sacred Blacksmith opening theme
  - coupled with "Nakisou ni Naru"
- Yumeiro Patissiere theme song single (Released January 20, 2010)
  - "Yume ni Yell! Patissiere♪" (opening theme)
- Yumeiro Patissiere SP Professional theme song single (Released October 27, 2010)
  - "Sweet Romance" (opening theme)
- Jewelpet Sunshine Opening and Ending Single (Released June 22, 2011)
  - "GO! GO! Sunshine" (opening theme)

=== Albums ===
- Iridescent (Released September 10, 2005)
  1. "Birth"
  2. "Wakeari"
  3. "Rokunenburi"
  4. "Sepia Blue"
  5. "Rainbow: Yorimichi ni Muchuu"
  6. "Joan"
  7. "Ao ga Me ni Shimiru"
  8. "Private Smile"
  9. "Diamonds"
  10. "Akai Hana"
- Mayumi Gojo Vocal Best from Futari wa Pretty Cure (Released June 6, 2007)
  1. "Danzen! Futari wa PreCure"
  2. "Cure Action"
  3. "PreCure Tension Bing Bing Bang Bang!"
  4. "Jounetsu! (Mugendai)"
  5. "Gecchuu! Raburabuu?!"
  6. Danzen! Futari wa PreCure (ver. Max Heart)"
  7. Murimuri!? Ariari! IN jaa na~i?!" (performed with Young Fresh)
  8. "A Wish of a Heart"
  9. "Kogarashi no Ding Dong"
  10. "Wonder Winter Yattaa!!"
  11. "Makasete Splash Star (cover ver.)" (performed with Splash Stars)
  12. "Egao no Chikara"
  13. "'Warau ga Kachi' de GO!"
  14. "Pikapika Healing"
  15. "Ganbalance de Dance" (performed with Flappy and Choppies)
  16. "Tabidachi no Asa ni (piano ver.)"
- Iridescent+(plus) (Released September 27, 2007)
  1. "Birth"
  2. "Wakeari"
  3. "Negai Tsuki"
  4. "In My Way"
  5. "Rokunenburi"
  6. "Sepia Blue"
  7. "Rainbow: Yorimichi ni Muchuu"
  8. "Joan"
  9. "Ao ga Me ni Shimiru"
  10. "Private Smile"
  11. "35°C"
  12. "Diamonds"
  13. "Akai Hana (with piano version)"
- Trilogy (Released September 28, 2011)
  1. "Danzen! Futari wa PreCure (ver. Max Heart)"
  2. "Wonder Winter Yattaa!!"
  3. "Mahou de Choi Choi"
  4. "GO! GO! Sunshine"
  5. "Yume ni Yell! Patissiere♪"
  6. "Sweet Romance"
  7. "Asairo no Mukou" (Original)
  8. "Ibara no Mori"
  9. "Elpis"
  10. "Aozora no Hate e"
  11. "Justice of Light"
  12. "Eternal Wing"
  13. "in this serenity"

=== Soundtracks ===
- Ojamajo CD Club Sono 1: Ojamajo Vocal Collection!! (Released April 21, 1999)
  - "Pirikapiri Lucky!""
  - "Mahou de Choi^{2}"
  - "Juubyou Kazoete"
- Ojamajo Ban^{2} CD Club Sono 2 Mo~tto! Ojamajo Swe~et Song Collection!! (Released May 23, 2001)
  - "Ganbarimasu!!"
  - "Miracle Power"
- Ojamajo Dokka~n! CD Club Sono 2: Ojamajo Dokka~n! Song Library!! (Released June 21, 2002)
  - "Ojamajo is No.1!"
  - "Kiai Ippatsu Kimechae Otome!"
- Futari wa Pretty Cure Vocal Album: Duel Vocal Wave!: Arittake no egao de (Released September 24, 2004)
  - "Ame nochi Appare"
  - "Cure Action"
  - "Suki nanoni... Bimyou!!"
  - "Pretty Exercise" (performed with Yoko Honna and Yukana)
- Futari wa PreCure Vocal Album 2: Vocal Rainbow Storm!!: Hikari ni naritai (Released December 22, 2004)
  - "PreCure Tension Bing Bing Bang Bang!"
  - "Jounetsu! (Mugendai)"
- Xenosaga: The Animation Original Soundtrack (Released March 23, 2005)
  - "In This Serenity" (ending theme)
- Music Album Bouken Ou Beet (Released June 22, 2005)
  - "Hero"
  - "Eternal Wing"
- Colo-chan Pack: Sanrio Character Song Series Sanrio Character no Dokidoki Kodomo Paradise (Released June 22, 2005)
  - "Reggae Paradise"
- Colo-chan Pack: Mahou Sentai Magiranger 3 (Released October 19, 2005)
  - "Eien ni..."
- Futari wa Pretty Cure Max Heart Vocal Album: Extreme Vocal Luminario!!: Onaji yume mite (Released October 21, 2005)
  - "Daisuki ga Ippai"
  - "A Wish of a Heart"
- Magical Complete Songs: Mahou Sentai Magiranger Zenkyokushuu (Released December 21, 2005)
  - "Eien ni..."
  - "Sing! Swing!! Smoky!!!" (chorus)
- Futari wa PreCure Max Heart Vocal Album II: "A" kara hajimaru aikotoba (Released December 22, 2005)
  - "Challenge Change" (performed with Yoko Honna & Yukana)
- "Saishuu Heiki Kanojo" Ongakushuu (Released January 18, 2006)
  - "Kimi no Uta" (performed under the alias MAYUMI)
- Futari wa Pretty Cure Max Heart Original Soundtrack: PreCure Sound Screw! Max!! Spark!! (Released January 25, 2006)
  - "Tabidachi no Asa ni" (insert song)
- Futari wa Pretty Cure Splash Star Vocal Album I: Yes! PreCure Smile (Released July 21, 2006)
  - "blessing" (performed with Yuka Uchiyae)
  - "Egao no Chikara"
- Futari wa PreCure Splash Star Vocal Album II: Kiseki no Shizuku (Released November 22, 2006)
  - "Nanatsu no Izumi o Dakkanseyo!!: Fifth Element no Gyakushuu" (performed by Dark Elements)
  - "Pikapika Healing"
  - "Girl's Work" (Performed with Orie Kimoto, Atsuko Enomoto and Yuka Uchiyae)
- Ura School Rumble Nigakki: Megane no Seisen! (Released December 22, 2006)
  - "Love&Peace"
- Super Sentai & Futari wa PreCure (Released March 21, 2007)
- Saishin Anime & Super Hero Song Best Collection (Released May 23, 2007)
  - "Hello! Licca-chan" (Ningyou Animation Licca-chan)
- Yes! PreCure 5 Vocal Album II: Vocal Explosion! (Released November 9, 2007)
  - "Muscat" (performed with Yuka Uchiyae)
- Yamasa 40th Anniversary Tracks (Released December 5, 2007)
  - "Space Horizon featuring Mayumi Gojo" (from M-771/BIG BONUS)
- Yes! PreCure GoGo! Vocal Album 1: My dear friend ~PreCure kara no shoutaijou~ (Released August 6, 2008)
  - "Rose in Rose"
- PreCure 5th Anniversary: Precure Vocal Box 1: Hikari no Shou (Released August 6, 2008)
  - "PreCure 5, Smile Go Go! (Mayumi Gojo ver.)" (bonus track)
- Colo-chan Pack: Engine Sentai Go-onger (Released September 3, 2008)
  - "Take Off! Go-on Wings: Break Sky-Mix" (performed as part of Project.R with Takayoshi Tanimoto)
- Engine Sentai Go-onger Sound Grand Prix 3rd Bunbun! Banban! Santoraban!! (Released September 24, 2008)
  - "Engine Formation Rap: Gekijou Bang! Custom" (performed by Project.R with Engine Kids)
- Yes! PreCure 5 GoGo! Vocal Album 2: Switch On!: Soshite, sekai wa hirogatteiku (Released December 3, 2008)
  - "Sound: itsu made mo kore kara mo"
- PreCure 5th Anniversary: PreCure Vocal Box 2: Kibou no Shou (Released December 3, 2008)
  - "Te to Te Tsunaide Heart mo Link!!" (bonus track)
- Engine Sentai Go-onger Zenkyokushuu Song Grand Prix (Released January 14, 2009)
  - "Engine Winning Run: Type Formula" (last ending theme, performed by Project.R with Engine Kids)
- Yes! PreCure 5 GoGo! Original Soundtrack 2: PreCure Sound Fleuret!! (Released January 28, 2009)
  - "Danzen! Makasete Full Throttle GoGo!" (bonus track, performed with Yuki Uchiyae and Mayu Kudo)
- Yes! PreCure 5 GoGo! Vocal Best!! (Released April 3, 2009)
  - "PreCure 5, Full Throttle GoGo! (Cure Quartet Ver.)" (performed by Cure Quartet)
- Time Rescue Original Soundtrack (Released November 11, 2009)
  - "Tokei Jikake no Yume"
- Mini Album Tensou Sentai Goseiger (Released April 28, 2010)
  - "Fight" (insert song, performed as part of Project.R)
- Narcissu: Moshimo ashita ga aru nara Portable Vocal Album (Released June 25, 2010)
  - "Elpis"
- Light Vocal Collection IV (Released January 28, 2011)
  - "Rose!Rose!Rose!" (R.U.R.U.R -petit prince- opening theme)

=== Other CDs ===
- 2005-nen Undoukai-you CD 5: Dang Dang Dance (Released March 23, 2005)
  - "Dang Dang Dance"
- Kodomo no Uta: Ippai! Fukubukuro (Released November 23, 2005)
  - "MushiKing Samba!" (Kouchuu Ouja MushiKing: Mori no tami no densetsu)
  - "Hello! Thank You!" (Pokémon☆Sunday, performed with Mori no Ki Jidou Gasshoudan)
- 2006-nen Undoukai 4: Minna Daisuki Dancing Boogie-woogie (Released March 22, 2006)
  - "Minna Daisuki Dancing Boogie-woogie"
- Family Christmas (Released November 7, 2007)
  - "Para-para Christmas Medley"
- Yuki Furu Uta 2: Koisuru Kimi no Fuyu Monogatari (Released November 30, 2007)
  - "Seinaru Yoru ni" (Performed with Michiru Kaori, Rekka Katakiri, Rina Sato, Haruka Shimotsuki and Yuki
  - "Party Sky"
  - "Yuki no Hana"
  - "Winter Coming" (Performed with Rekka Katakiri, Rina Sato, Haruka Shimotsuki and Yuki)
- Natsu Uta 2: Kimi to Kanaderu Ai no Uta (Released June 27, 2008)
  - "Pinpoint"
  - "Happiness"
  - "Love Paradise" (performed with Michiru Kaori, Rekka Katakiri, Rina Sato, Chata and Yuzuki)
- 2008 Happyoukai 2: Boku wa Piccolino (Released August 6, 2008)
  - "Para-para Christmas Medley" (Morobito Kozorite/Akahana no Tonakai/We Wish You a Merry Christmas /Jingle Bells, performed with Himawari Kids)
- Kotonoha Classic Vol.2 (Released March 4, 2009)
  - "Hi o Shirusu" (J. Strauss: Wiener Blut)
- Kotonoha Classic Vol.3 (Released March 4, 2009)
  - "Kuchibiru" (Chopin: Raindrop)
- Yuki Furu Uta 3: Fuyu no Uta Towa no Uta (Released October 20, 2010)
  - "Toge no Mori"
- Sakura no Mau Koro ni: Sotsugyou Album Daiichi Gakushou (Released February 19, 2010)
  - "Boku ga Otona ni Naru Hi"
- Minna de Utaou PreCure Party!: Halloween, Bon'odori, Otanjoukai, Taisou, Christmas (Released September 28, 2016)
  - PreCure Ontou: Smile Wink (Go! Princess PreCure, episode 27 & Maho Girls PreCure!, episode 29, insert song)
  - Happy Birthday LOVE (performed with Kanako Miyamoto)

== Appearances ==
=== Animation ===
- Mo~tto! Ojamajo Doremi: Kaeru Ishi no Himitsu as Mayuri
- Futari wa Pretty Cure Max Heart as Highland customer (episode 12)

=== Web radio ===
- Radio! Utatane Biyori (November 29, 2007 – September 24, 2009)
- Radio! Utatane Biyori Neo (October 8, 2009–present)
- Gojo Tanimoto no Animex Radio!! (April 5, 2010–present)
