= Yūko Sanpei =

Japanese actress (born 1986)

- 三瓶 由布子
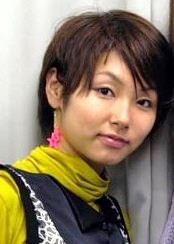
- Sanpei in 2008
- Born: February 28, 1986 (age 40); Tokyo, Japan
- Education: Tokyo Polytechnic University
- Occupations: Actress; voice actress
- Years active: 2000–present
- Agent: Axlone
- Height: 156 cm (5 ft 1 in)
- Children: 2

Yūko Sanpei (三瓶 由布子, Sanpei Yūko; born February 28, 1986) is a Japanese actress and voice actress from Tokyo, Japan. She voiced Nozomi Yumehara/Cure Dream in Yes! PreCure 5 and its sequel GoGo!. She currently voices the eponymous character in Boruto.

== Biography ==
Sanpei made her voice acting debut in the anime series UFO Baby. Initially, she was a second-year junior high school student, the same as the character. She voiced Renton Thurston in Eureka Seven became her first starring work. She was also the first main personality on the publicity radio with Kaori Nazuka.

In 2006, she played the first female role in the series Ouran High School Host Club as Shiori Ebisugawa and, in 2007, she voiced Nozomi Yumehara/Cure Dream in Yes! PreCure 5.

After leaving the theater company Wakakusa around May 2007, she went to Production Baobab on November 1 of the same year after a freelance period. In 2010, she joined the stage after a long time for the performance of Song of Joy.

On October 1, 2011, she left Production Baobab to transfer to the Axlone agency. On February 28, 2013, Sanpei announced on her blog that she was married. She also announced on the official blog that her first child was born on October 1, 2014.

In 2019, she won the Best Actress in a Leading Role at the 13th Seiyu Awards.

On July 5, she announced on her Twitter account that she had a second child.

On August 18, 2021, it was announced Sanpei tested positive for COVID-19.

== Filmography ==
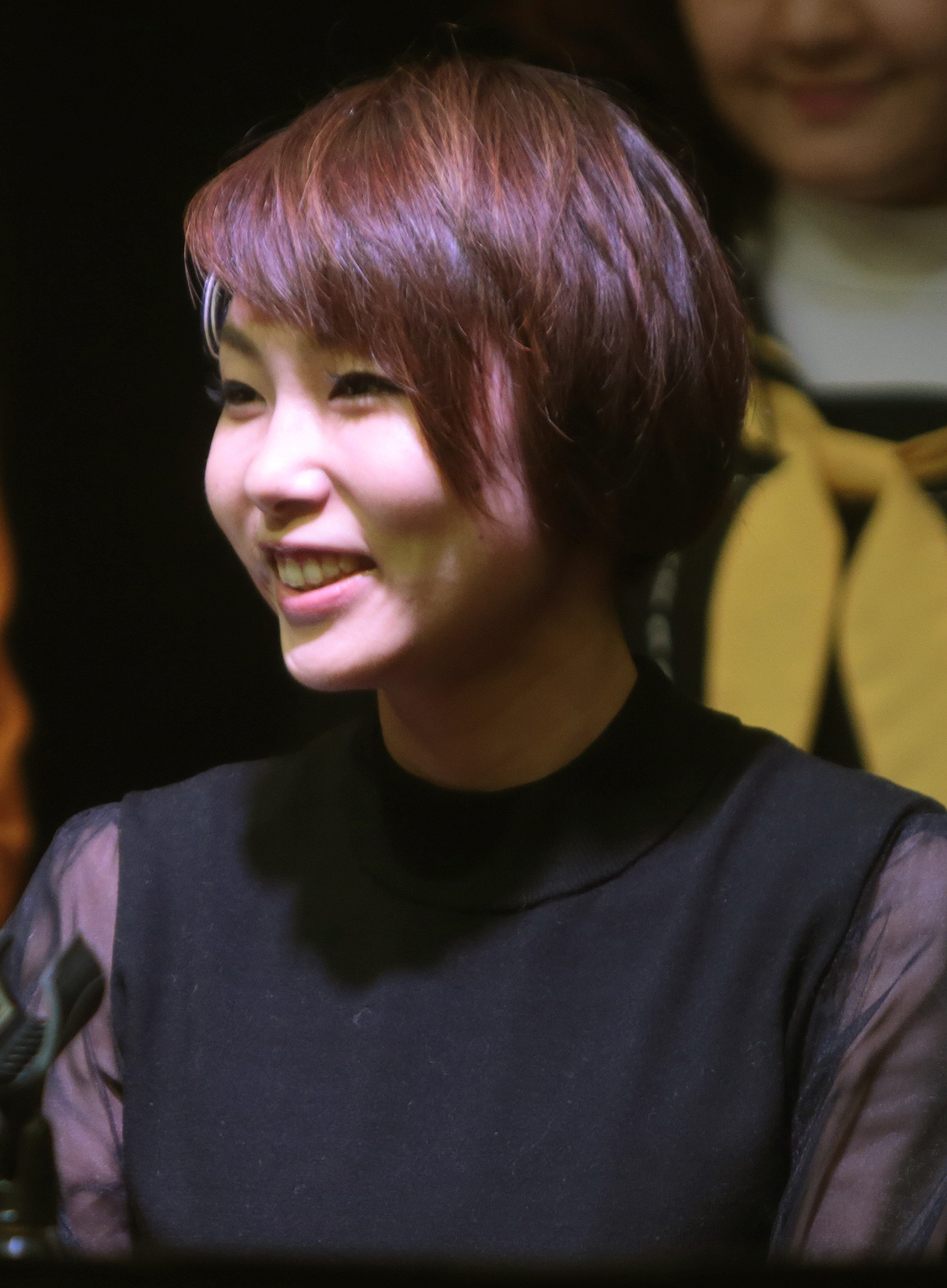
Sanpei at Taiyou Con 2017 in Mesa, Arizona

=== Anime television series ===
- UFO Baby (2000), Kanata Saionji – debut role
- Ojarumaru (2001), Hoshino (2nd voice), Rikie, Kazuko Endo
- Galaxy Angel A (2002), Cocomo Perot
- Di Gi Charat Nyo! (2003), Ponzu
- Galaxy Angel AA (2003), Cocomo Perot
- Nanaka 6/17 (2003), Nenji Nagihara (6 years old), Yūki
- DearS (2004), Takeya Ikuhara (child)
- Galaxy Angel X (2004), Cocomo Perot
- Jubei-chan 2 ~The Counter Attack of Siberian Yagyu~ (2004), Jubei Yagyu (child)
- School Rumble (2004), Shuuji Harima
- Sweet Valerian (2004), Masao-kun
- Eureka Seven (2005), Renton Thurston
- Gyagu Manga Biyori (2005), Ramen Spirit
- MÄR (2005), Choro
- Mushishi (2005), Shinra Ioroi
- Onegai My Melody (2005), Ryō Ōta
- Aria the Natural (2006), Akatsuki Izumo (child)
- D.Gray-man (2006), Jean Russell
- Gintama (2006), Seita
- Onegai My Melody: Kuru Kuru Shuffle! (2006), Ryō Ōta
- Otogi-Jushi Akazukin (2006), Souta Suzukaze – 2nd voice
- Ouran High School Host Club (2006), Shiori Ebisugawa
- School Rumble Nigakki (2006), Shuuji Harima
- Soreike! Anpanman (2006), Pink Shokupanman, Violin-kun
- Shinseiki Duel Masters Flash (2006), Kasumi
- Yume Tsukai (2006), Kentaro
- Koisuru Tenshi Angelique: Kagayaki no Ashita (2007), Matt
- Bokurano (2007), Yoko Machi
- Darker than Black (2007), Maki
- Hello Kitty Ringo no Mori to Parallel Town (2007), Henry
- Les Misérables: Shōjo Cosette (2007), Paulette, Bressole
- Myself ; Yourself (2007), Syusuke Wakatsuki (child)
- Reborn! (2007), Fūta and Lavina
- Sola (2007), Takeshi Tsujido (child)
- Shakugan no Shana II (2007), Yuri Chvojka
- Yes! PreCure 5 (2007), Nozomi Yumehara/Cure Dream
- Blassreiter (2008), Joseph Jobson (10 years old)
- Dazzle (2008), Elmer
- Hell Girl: Three Vessels (2008), Kazuya Ichimura
- Inazuma Eleven (2008), Terumi "Aphrodi" Afuro
- Kaiba (2008), Copy Warp
- Majin Tantei Nōgami Neuro (2008), Eri Hoshino
- Yes! PreCure 5 Go Go! (2008), Nozomi Yumehara/Cure Dream
- Xam'd: Lost Memories (2008), Nakiami
- Natsu no Arashi! (2009), Hajime Yasaka
- Fullmetal Alchemist: Brotherhood (2009), Selim Bradley/Pride
- Kimi ni Todoke (2009), Chizuru Yoshida
- Saki (2009), Kazue Nanpo
- Seikon no Qwaser (2010), Alexander Nikolaevich Hell
- Arakawa Under the Bridge (2010), Tetsuo
- Metal Fight Beyblade (2010), Masamune Kadoya
- Ikkitousen: Xtreme Xecutor (2010), Kansui Bun'yaku
- Mitsudomoe (2010), Shinya Satou
- Squid Girl (2010), Yūta Matsumoto
- Strike Witches 2 (2010), Nishiki Nakajima
- Tamagotchi! (2010), Melodytchi
- Seikon no Qwaser II (2011), Alexander Nikolaevich Hell
- Nekogami Yaoyorozu (2011), Gonta
- Yu-Gi-Oh! Zexal (2011), Haruto Tenjo, Obomi
- The Idolmaster (2011), Ryo Akizuki
- Cross Fight B-Daman (2011), Ryuji Sumeragi
- Aikatsu! (2012), Kakeru Ōta
- Area no Kishi (2012), Kakeru Aizawa
- Toriko (2012), Fond de Buono
- Space Brothers (2012), Young Hibito Nanba
- Danchi Tomoo (2013), Tomoo Kinoshita
- Hakkenden: Eight Dogs of the East (2013), Kenta
- D-Frag! (2014), Azuma Matsubara
- Hero Bank (2014), Kaito Gōshō
- Majin Bone (2014), Gilbert
- Pokémon: XY (2014), Sanpei
- Anti-Magic Academy: The 35th Test Platoon (2015), Isuka Suginami
- Kamisama Kiss◎ (2015), Shinjiro
- Snow White with the Red Hair (2015), Ryuu
- March Comes in Like a Lion (2016), Harunobu Nikaidō (young)
- Nyanbo! (2016), Kuro
- Rin-ne (2016), Shoma
- Snow White with the Red Hair 2nd Season (2016), Ryuu
- World Trigger (2016), Yuzuru Ema
- Inuyashiki (2017), Takeshi Inuyashiki
- Boruto: Naruto Next Generations (2017), Boruto Uzumaki
- Tsugumomo (2017), Kazuya Kagami
- Land of the Lustrous (2017), Aculeatus
- Gakuen Babysitters (2018), Taka Kamitani/Shizuka Kamitani
- Captain Tsubasa (2018), Tsubasa Ozora
- Inazuma Eleven: Ares no Tenbin (2018), Afuro "Aphrodi" Terumi
- No Guns Life (2019), Seven
- Ascendance of a Bookworm (2020), Gil
- Tsugu Tsugumomo (2020), Kazuya Kagami
- Digimon Adventure: (2020), Taichi Yagami
- Yashahime: Princess Half-Demon (2020), Jakotsumaru
- Summer Time Rendering (2022), Ryūnosuke Minakata
- Uzaki-chan Wants to Hang Out! ω (2022), Kiri Uzaki
- Legend of Mana: The Teardrop Crystal (2022), Bud
- Jujutsu Kaisen 2nd Season (2023), Ui Ui
- Tonari no Yōkai-san (2024), Ryō Sano
- Fire Force 3rd Season (2025), Faerie
- Gachiakuta (2025), Remlin Tysark
- The Daughter of the Demon Lord Is Too Kind! (2026), Mayu
- Kill Blue (2026), Juzo Ogami (young)
- The Elusive Samurai (2026), Natsu-no-yon^{Ep. 19 credits}

=== Original video animation (OVA) ===
- Alien Nine (Hiroshi Iwanami)
- Grrl Power (Akira)
- Hiyokoi (Natsuki Aizawa)
- My-Otome 0~S.ifr~ (Elliot Chandler)
- Majokko Tsukune-chan (Nabul, Mika Onigawara)

=== Original net animation (ONA) ===
- Pokémon: Twilight Wings (2020), Hop
- Dragon's Dogma (2020), Louis
- Star Wars: Visions - The Duel (2021), Village Chief

=== Film ===
- Doraemon: Nobita no Himitsu Dōgu Museum (2013) as Kurt
- Pretty Cure All Stars Movie Series (Nozomi Yumehara/Cure Dream)
- Boruto: Naruto the Movie (Boruto Uzumaki)

=== Video games ===
- JoJo's Bizarre Adventure: All Star Battle (Narancia Ghirga)
- JoJo's Bizarre Adventure: Eyes of Heaven (Narancia Ghirga)
- .hack//LINK (Tokio Kuryuu)
- Another Century's Episode 3 (Renton Thurston)
- Luminous Arc (Theo)
- Minna no Golf Portable 2 (Leo)
- Castlevania Judgment (Eric Lecarde)
- Fantasy Earth: Zero (Ella)
- Tales of Graces (young Richard)
- The Idolmaster Dearly Stars (Ryo Akizuki)
- Naruto Shippuden: Ultimate Ninja Storm 4 (Boruto Uzumaki)
- Super Robot Wars Z (Renton Thurston)
- Super Robot Wars Z: Special Disc (Renton Thurston)
- Hyperdimension Neptunia Mk2 (Kei Jinguji)
- Rune Factory 4 (Noel)
- Captain Tsubasa Zero: Miracle Shoot (Tsubasa Ozora)
- Captain Tsubasa: Rise of New Champions (Tsubasa Ozora)
- Digimon Story: Cyber Sleuth – Hacker's Memory (Yu Nogi)
- Another Eden (Philo)
- Granblue Fantasy (Furias)
- Arknights (Aak)
- Atelier Lulua: The Scion of Arland (Chimdragon)
- Azur Lane (Jamaica)
- Yoon Yonghyeon (Sdorica)
- SinoAlice (Pinocchio)
- Valkyrie Connect (Dinavia)
- Genshin Impact, Mika
- Girls' Frontline 2: Exilium (Sextans)

=== Dubbing roles ===
==== Live-action ====
- Anna and the Apocalypse (Steph North (Sarah Swire))
- Awake (Diana (Francesca Eastwood))
- Cop Car (Harrison (Hays Wellford))
- FBI: Most Wanted (Sheryll Barnes (Roxy Sternberg))
- Ratter (Nicole (Rebecca Naomi Jones))
- Red Election (Beatrice Ogilvy (Lydia Leonard))

==== Animation ====
- El Tigre: The Adventures of Manny Rivera (Manny Rivera/El Tigre)
- Fly Me to the Moon (I.Q.)
