= List of Pretty Cure (2004 TV series) episodes =

Pretty Cure
- Season 1
- No. of episodes: 49

Release
- Original network: ANN (ABC)
- Original release: February 1, 2004 – January 30, 2005

Series chronology
- Next → Pretty Cure Max Heart

Pretty Cure is the first Pretty Cure television series, airing on ANN and produced by Toei Animation. The story follows two girls, Nagisa Misumi and Honoka Yukishiro (Natalie Blackstone and Hannah Whitehouse), who fight the forces of the Dark Zone — a dimension of evil that has encroached on the Garden of Light. The first season aired in Japan between February 1, 2004, and January 30, 2005. The opening theme is "Danzen! Futari wa Pretty Cure" (Danzen! ふたりはプリキュア Danzen! Futari wa Purikyua?, "Danzen! We Are Pretty Cure") by Mayumi Gojo whilst the ending theme is "Get You! Love Love?!" (ゲッチュウ!らぶらぶぅ?! Getchū! Rabu Rabu?!?) also by Gojo. It was dubbed in English by Toei Animation Inc. and Blue Water Studios and aired in Canada on YTV between March 6, 2009, and July 31, 2010. The opening theme of the English dub is: "Together We Are Pretty Cure".

== Episode list ==
No. overall	No. in season	Title	Directed by	Written by	Animation directed by	Art directed by	Original release date	English air date
1	1	"What D' You Mean Transform?" "We Can Transform!? No Way!"; Transliteration: "Watashitachi ga Henshin!? Arienai!" (Japanese: 私たちが変身!?ありえない!)	Naoyuki Itō	Ryō Kawasaki	Katsumi Tamegai	Shinzo Yuki & Hiromitsu Shiozaki	February 1, 2004	March 6, 2009
Classmates Nagisa Misumi and Honoka Yukishiro, who have never spoken to each other, meet Mepple and Mipple from the Garden of Light, who give them the power to transform into Pretty Cure.
2	2	"Cleaning up the City" "Give Me a Break! A City Targeted by Darkness"; Transliteration: "Kanbenshite! Yami ni Nerawareta Machi" (Japanese: カンベンして! 闇に狙われた街)	Yasuo Yamayoshi	Ryō Kawasaki	Ninji Takahashi	Shinzo Yuki & Tadami Shimokawa	February 8, 2004	March 13, 2009
Nagisa and Honoka work together to figure out the cause of a citywide power outage.
3	3	"Who's the New T.A.?" "Beware of the Cute Student Teacher!"; Transliteration: "Iketeru Jisshūsei ni Ki o Tsukero!" (Japanese: イケてる実習生に気をつけろ!)	Takao Iwai	Ryō Kawasaki	Toshie Kawamura	Shinzo Yuki & Tomoko Ide	February 15, 2004	March 20, 2009
Pisard disguises himself as a student teacher in an attempt to steal the Prism Stones, hypnotizing their teacher into bringing them to the gym and threatening to harm her as they fight the Zakenna.
4	4	"Mystery at the Museum" "A Miracle!? The Art Museum Comes to Life"; Transliteration: "Mirakuru!? Ikiteiru Bijutsukan" (Japanese: ミラクル!?生きている美術館)	Akinori Yabe	Higashi Shimizu	Yasuhiro Namatame	Shinzo Yuki & Hiromitsu Shiozaki	February 22, 2004	March 27, 2009
Nagisa and Honoka's class goes on a trip to the art museum, where they learn the story of how Mipple arrived on Earth one hundred years ago. When Pisard attacks and summons a Zakenna from several paintings, they must avoid harming the people who have been transformed into statues.
5	5	"Is it Over Yet?" "Serious Trouble! A Desperate Pisard"; Transliteration: "Majiyaba! Sutemi no Pīsādo" (Japanese: マジヤバ! 捨て身のピーサード)	Takenori Kawada	Daisuke Habara	Hiroyuki Kawano	Shinzo Yuki & Tadami Shimokawa	February 29, 2004	April 3, 2009
Pisard is given a final chance to defeat the Cures, but they defeat him and recover the Green Prism Stone.
6	6	"Mountains, Ogres and Bears" "A New Darkness! The Bear in the Dangerous Forest"; Transliteration: "Arata na Yami! Kiken na Mori no Kuma-san" (Japanese: 新たな闇! 危険な森のクマさん)	Toshiaki Komura	Ryō Kawasaki	Mikine Kuwahara	Shinzo Yuki & Tomoko Ide	March 7, 2004	April 10, 2009
After Mepple accidentally loses the Prism Hopish, Nagisa and Honoka go hiking in the forest to find it. When Gekidrago, a new agent of the Dark King, attacks and turns a bear into a Zakenna, they use the new Rainbow Therapy technique to purify it without harming it.
7	7	"Lacrossed Wires" "A Bitter Lacrosse Battle! A Maiden's Heart is So Delicate!"; Transliteration: "Nettō Rakurosu! Otomegokoro wa Chōbimiyō!" (Japanese: 熱闘ラクロス!乙女心は超ビミョー!)	Yoshihiro Oka	Ryō Kawasaki	Mitsuru Aoyama	Shinzo Yuki & Shōichirō Sugiura	March 14, 2004	April 17, 2009
When Gekidrago attacks during a lacrosse tournament and turns the vice principal into a Zakenna, Nagisa must decide whether to help Honoka or her team.
8	8	"The Pretty Cure Breakup" "Pretty Cure Breaks Up! Isn't It Too Soon For That!?"; Transliteration: "Purikyua Kaisan! Bucchake Hayasugi!?" (Japanese: プリキュア解散!ぶっちゃけ早すぎ!?)	Takuya Igarashi	Higashi Shimizu	Katsumi Tamegai	Shinzo Yuki & Hiromitsu Shiozaki	March 21, 2004	April 24, 2009
Honoka's attempt to help Nagisa and Fuji-P get together backfires, causing a rift between her and Nagisa.
9	9	"Get Him Back! Operation Rescue!" "Give Him Back! The Great Mepo Mepo Operation!"; Transliteration: "Torikaese! Mepo Mepo Daisakusen!" (Japanese: 取り返せ! メポメポ大作戦)	Yasuo Yamayoshi	Daisuke Habara	Toshie Kawamura	Shinzo Yuki & Tadami Shimokawa	March 28, 2004	May 1, 2009
After Mepple falls ill and the vice-principal confiscates him after mistaking him for a cell phone, Nagisa must save him.
10	10	"Birthday Heist" "Honoka Explodes! A Wonderful Birthday"; Transliteration: "Honoka Sakuretsu! Suteki na Tanjōbi" (Japanese: ほのか炸裂! 素敵な誕生日)	Takao Iwai	Yoshimi Narita	Toshiharu Takahashi	Tomoko Yoshida	April 4, 2004	May 8, 2009
Honoka's parents come home from work for her birthday and take her to a jewelry store, where robbers take them hostage as Gekidrago attacks.
11	11	"Fish Out of Water" "Save Ryouta! Gekidrago Panic!"; Transliteration: "Ryōta o Sukue! Gekidorāgo Panikku!" (Japanese: 亮太を救え!ゲキドラーゴ・パニック)	Takenori Kawada	Higashi Shimizu	Shûichi Iijima	Shinzo Yuki & Yukie Yuki	April 11, 2004	May 15, 2009
Nagisa and Honoka go with Ryouta on a trip to the aquarium for his school project, where Gekidrago attacks, but they defeat him and recover the Blue Prism Stone.
12	12	"Darkness in Disguise" "The Evil Flower, Poisonny Appears! Who is She?"; Transliteration: "Aku no Hana, Poizunī Sanjō! tte Dare?" (Japanese: 悪の華・ポイズニー参上!って誰?)	Akinori Yabe	Ryō Kawasaki	Yasuhiro Namatame	Shinzo Yuki & Tadami Shimokawa	April 18, 2004	May 22, 2009
Poisonny, a new agent of the Dark King, attacks and disguises herself in an attempt to exploit Nagisa and Honoka's weaknesses and steal Mepple and Mipple.
13	13	"Who's the New Student?" "Beware! The Young Transfer Student"; Transliteration: "Goyōjin! Toshishita no Tenkōsei" (Japanese: ご用心! 年下の転校生)	Toshiaki Komura	Yoshimi Narita	Hiroyuki Kawano	Shōichirō Sugiura	April 25, 2004	May 29, 2009
Kiriya, Poisonny's younger brother, disguises himself as a transfer student to Verone Academy to spy on Nagisa and Honoka.
14	14	"Spot the Fakes" "Are You Kidding!? Pretty Cure Impostors Go Wild"; Transliteration: "Uso Honto!? Nise Purikyua ō Abare" (Japanese: ウソホント!?にせプリキュア大暴れ)	Takao Yoshizawa	Daisuke Habara	Mitsuru Aoyama	Shinzo Yuki & Hiromitsu Shiozaki	May 2, 2004	June 5, 2009
Nagisa and Honoka's classmates Natsuko Koshino and Kyoko Mori, who admire the Cures but are unaware of their secret identities, impersonate them. Poisonny controls them to attack the Cures, hoping to force them to hand over the Prism Stones in exchange for their safety.
15	15	"We Need A Vacation" "A Really Dangerous Family Vacation"; Transliteration: "Metcha Abunai Kazoku Ryokō" (Japanese: メッチャ危ない家族旅行)	Yoshihiro Ueda	Higashi Shimizu	Miho Azuma	Shinzo Yuki & Tomoko Ide	May 9, 2004	June 12, 2009
Nagisa and Honoka, whose families happen to be vacationing at the same spot, decide to explore the island and learn about its local legends.
16	16	"Practice Makes Perfect" "Stress Full Throttle! Being the Madonna is Tough"; Transliteration: "Sutoresu Zenkai! Madonna wa Tsurai yo" (Japanese: ストレス全開!マドンナはつらいよ)	Yasuo Yamayoshi	Yumi Kageyama	Toshie Kawamura	Shinzo Yuki & Tadami Shimokawa	May 16, 2004	June 19, 2009
After Poisonny's Zakenna possesses Yuka Odajima, the "Madonna" of Verone Academy, it creates numerous clones of her throughout the school.
17	17	"Cultivating Crushes" "Capture His Heart! Heart-Throbbing Farm Work"; Transliteration: "Hāto wo Getto! Tokimeki Nōsagyō" (Japanese: ハートをゲット! トキメキ農作業)	Takao Iwai	Yoshimi Narita	Katsumi Tamegai	Shinzo Yuki & Hiromitsu Shiozaki	May 23, 2004	June 26, 2009
Kimata invites Fujip, Kiriya, and Honoka, who in turn invites Nagisa, to help with the harvest on his grandparents' farm.
18	18	"Midterm Mission" "Heart-Throbbing! Midterm Tests are a Love Labyrinth"; Transliteration: "Dokidoki! Chūkan Tesuto wa Koi no Meikyū" (Japanese: ドキドキ!中間テストは恋の迷宮)	Takenori Kawada & Akifumi Zako	Ryō Kawasaki	Toshiharu Takahashi	Shinzo Yuki & Tomoko Ide	May 30, 2004	July 22, 2009
Poisonny attacks Nagisa and Honoka and traps them in a maze of mirrors shortly before their midterm exams.
19	19	"The Dark Zone's Secret Weapon" "Too Scary! Dusk Zone's Final Trump Card"; Transliteration: "Kowa Sugi! Dotsuku Zōn Saigo no Kirifuda" (Japanese: こわすぎ! ドックゾーン最後の切り札)	Akinori Yabe	Higashi Shimizu	Shûichi Iijima	Shinzo Yuki & Tadami Shimokawa	June 8, 2004	July 23, 2009
Ilkuubo is sent to attack the Cures and overwhelms them with the power of the Dark Zone.
20	20	"A Double Dose of Smart" "Which is the Real One? The Two Honokas"; Transliteration: "Dotchi ga Honmono? Futari no Honoka" (Japanese: どっちが本物?ふたりのほのか)	Toshiaki Komura	Daisuke Habara	Mitsuru Aoyama	Shinzo Yuki & Tomoko Ide	June 13, 2004	July 27, 2009
Poisonny is given a final chance to defeat the Cures and impersonates Honoka in an attempt to trick Nagisa into giving her Mepple. However, they defeat her and recover the Yellow Prism Stone.
21	21	"The Truth about Kirea" "A Shocking Date! The Truth about Kiriya"; Transliteration: "Shōgeki Dēto! Kiriya no Shinjitsu" (Japanese: 衝撃デート! キリヤの真実)	Yoshihiro Ueda	Ryō Kawasaki	Hiroyuki Kawano	Shinzo Yuki & Tadami Shimokawa	June 27, 2004	July 28, 2009
Desperate after losing Poisonny, Kiriya confesses to Honoka that he is from the Dark Zone. After a battle, he willingly gives her his Prism Stone, the Yellow Prism Stone, before returning to the darkness to face his punishment.
22	22	"Puppy Pandemonium" "No Way! Chuutaro Becomes a Mom?!"; Transliteration: "Ussō! Chūtarō ga Mama ni Naru!?" (Japanese: ウッソー!忠太郎がママになる!?)	Yasuo Yamayoshi	Yumi Kageyama	Miho Azuma	Shinzo Yuki & Tomoko Ide	July 4, 2004	July 29, 2009
After Chuutaro finds an abandoned puppy, Nagisa and Honoka try to find its owner, and run into Ilkuubo, who has learned where the Prism Stones are hidden and of Wisdom, who protects them.
23	23	"Summer Camp Fiasco" "Danger! The Summer Camp Nightmare!"; Transliteration: "Ayaushi! Natsu Gasshuku no Akumu" (Japanese: 危うし!夏合宿の悪夢)	Takao Iwai	Daisuke Habara	Toshie Kawamura	Shinzo Yuki & Tatsurô Iseri	July 11, 2004	July 30, 2009
Nagisa and Honoka's training camp experiences strange events, such as power outages and dying trees. They learn that Ilkuubo caused these events as he forces the Prism Hopish out of its hiding place and takes it.
24	24	"Match Point! Pretty Cure Vs. Ilkubo" "Deathmatch! Pretty Cure vs. Ilkuubo"; Transliteration: "Kessen! Purikyua tai Irukūbo" (Japanese: 決戦! プリキュアvsイルクーボ)	Takenori Kawada	Ryō Kawasaki	Katsumi Tamegai	Shinzo Yuki & Tadami Shimokawa	July 18, 2004	August 13, 2009
Ilkuubo, who has taken the Prism Hopish and the Red and Blue Prism Stones, challenges the Cures to a final battle. However, when the power of the Stones reacts to the other Stones, their power overwhelms him and they return to Mepple and Mipple, respectively. They defeat him and recover the Purple Prism Stone, after which Pollun, the prince of the Garden of Light, arrives and asks them to come to the Garden.
25	25	"Return to the Garden of Light" "Let's Go to the Field of Light, Popo! Us Too!?"; Transliteration: "Iza Hikari no Sono e, popo! Watashitachi mo!?" (Japanese: いざ光の園へポポ!私たちも!?)	Tôru Yamada	Higashi Shimizu	Toshiharu Takahashi	Shinzo Yuki & Tomoko Ide	July 25, 2004	August 20, 2009
Nagisa and Honoka travel to the Garden of Light to return the Prism Stones and summon the power of creation from them to restore the Garden of Light. However Ilkuubo attacks and sends them and Wisdom to the Dark Zone.
26	26	"Saying Goodbye is Never Easy" "Goodbye, Mepple and Mipple!? No Way!"; Transliteration: "Sayanora, Meppuru, Mippuru!? Ya da!" (Japanese: さよならメップルミップル!?やだー!)	Hirotoshi Rissen	Yoshimi Narita	Shûichi Iijima	Shinzo Yuki & Tadami Shimokawa	August 1, 2004	August 27, 2009
After being sent to the Dark Zone, Nagisa and Honoka fight the Dark King and seemingly defeat him. Afterwards, the Garden of Light is restored and they part ways with Mepple, Mipple, and Pollun. However, they later return and reunite with them.
27	27	"A New Evil Gathers" "A New Darkness Closes in! Save the Lost Porun"; Transliteration: "Arata na Yami ga Semaru! Maigo no Porun wo Sukue" (Japanese: 新たな闇が迫る!迷子のポルンを救え)	Toshiaki Komura & Akifumi Zako	Ryō Kawasaki	Hiroyuki Kawano	Shinzo Yuki & Tomoko Ide	August 8, 2004	September 12, 2009
Nagisa and Honoka learn that after the defeat of the Dark King, three seeds were created from him; these seeds, known as the Seeds of Darkness, will eventually sprout after absorbing life from Earth. Pollun gets lost after running away, as he is still unfamiliar with Earth. As they search for him, office worker Ryuichiro Kakuzawa awakens as his true self Juna, one of the Seeds of Darkness, after absorbing energy from an oncoming typhoon. He attacks Nagisa and Honoka, but they defeat him.
28	28	"Turning Up the Heat" "Regine Appears! We've Had Enough of This Already!"; Transliteration: "Regīne tōjō! tte Mō Konai de!" (Japanese: レギーネ登場!ってもう来ないで!)	Daisuke Nishio	Daisuke Habara	Masumi Hattori	Shinzo Yuki & Tadami Shimokawa	August 15, 2004	September 26, 2009
On a hot day, Shoko Koyama awakens as her true self Regine, one of the Seeds of Darkness, after absorbing energy from a nearby volcano. She attacks Nagisa and Honoka, but they defeat her. More is also revealed about how Sanae, Honoka's grandmother, and Mipple met during World War II.
29	29	"Summer Ends with a Bang" "Stormy Summer Festival! The Thunder God is Super Scary!?"; Transliteration: "Arashi no Natsumatsuri! Kaminari-sama wa Chō Kowai!?" (Japanese: 嵐の夏祭り!カミナリ様は超コワイ!?)	Akinori Yabe	Yumi Kageyama	Miho Azuma	Shinzo Yuki & Tomoko Ide	August 22, 2004	October 3, 2009
As Nagisa and Honoka go to a summer festival, hospital director Yuuki Genbu awakens as his true self Belzei Gertrude, one of the Seeds of Darkness, after absorbing energy from a storm. He attacks them, but they defeat him.
30	30	"Pretty Cure Rainbow Storm" "Explosive! Pretty Cure Rainbow Storm"; Transliteration: "Sakuretsu! Purikyua Reinbō Sutōmu" (Japanese: 炸裂!プリキュアレインボーストーム)	Naoyuki Itō	Yoshimi Narita	Toshie Kawamura	Shinzo Yuki & Tadami Shimokawa	September 5, 2004	October 10, 2009
As Pollun sneaks to school by hiding in Nagisa's bag, the Seeds of Darkness capture Wisdom and take the Prism Stones. Before he is captured, Wisdom transfers the Stones' power into Pollun. He uses this power to grant Nagisa and Honoka the Rainbow Braces. With the Braces, they use their new attack Rainbow Storm to defeat the Seeds of Darkness, but realize that they still have Wisdom and the Stones.
31	31	"Porun on the Loose" "Did He Really Run Away? Where in the World is Pollun?"; Transliteration: "Maji Iede? Porun wa Ittai Doko!?" (Japanese: マジ家出?ポルンは一体どこ～!?)	Yasuo Yamayoshi	Higashi Shimizu	Katsumi Tamegai	Shinzo Yuki & Tomoko Ide	September 12, 2004	October 17, 2009
Pollun, curious about Earth, decides to visit.
32	32	"Cheer Up Porun" "Cheer Pollun Up! Special Carnival"; Transliteration: "Porun o Hagemase! Totteoki no Kaanibaru" (Japanese: ポルンを励ませ! とっておきのカーニバル)	Takenori Kawada	Daisuke Habara	Toshiharu Takahashi	Shinzo Yuki & Tadami Shimokawa	September 19, 2004	January 9, 2010
Pollun is feeling homesick, so Nagisa and Honoka take him to the amusement park.
33	33	"Teamwork Saves The Day" "Get the Victory! Find the Path of Light With Your Heart!!"; Transliteration: "Bui Getto! Kokoro De Tsunage Hikari no Pasurain!!" (Japanese: Vゲット! 心でつなげ光のパスライン!!)	Takao Iwai	Ryō Kawasaki	Shûichi Iijima	Shinzo Yuki & Tomoko Ide	September 26, 2004	January 16, 2010
After missing a shot during lacrosse practice, Shiho decides to quit the team.
34	34	"Running On Empty" "Nagisa Breaks Away! The Blazing 'Gachinko' Relay"; Transliteration: "Nagisa Bucchigiri! Honou no Gachinko Rirē" (Japanese: なぎさぶっちぎり! 炎のガチンコリレー)	Tôru Yamada	Yumi Kageyama	Hiroyuki Kawano	Mika Kosuga	October 3, 2004	January 23, 2010
It is track and field day at Verone Academy and Nagisa is set to race against Yuka.
35	35	"You Call This A Date?" "Is This a Date? Tumultuous Happy Birthday"; Transliteration: "Korette Dēto? Dotō no Happī Bāsudē" (Japanese: これってデート?怒涛のハッピーバースデー)	Hirotoshi Rissen	Yoshimi Narita	Masumi Hattori	Shinzo Yuki & Tomoko Ide	October 10, 2004	January 30, 2010
Kazuki, the star player of Verone Academy's basketball team, asks Nagisa to go chestnut picking with him on her birthday.
36	36	"Guardian's Great Escape" "Reach For Freedom! Stone Keeper's Desperate Great Escape"; Transliteration: "Jiyuu wo Tsukame! Bannin Kesshi no Daidassou" (Japanese: 自由を掴*め!番人決死の大脱走)	Akinori Yabe	Higashi Shimizu	Miho Azuma	Shinzo Yuki & Tadami Shimokawa	October 17, 2004	February 13, 2010
Wisdom attempts to escape from the Dark Zone.
37	37	"Shaking Up Shakespeare" "First Stage Performance!! Don't Lose, Romeo and Juliet"; Transliteration: "Iza Hatsubutai!! Makeruna Romio to Jurietto" (Japanese: いざ初舞台!!負けるなロミオとジュリエット)	Yoshihiro Oka	Daisuke Habara	Toshie Kawamura	Shinzo Yuki & Tomoko Ide	October 24, 2004	February 20, 2010
The Cherry Blossom class plans to put on a performance of Romeo and Juliet, and Nagisa and Honoka are chosen to play the main roles.
38	38	"Ryan's Solo Mission" "It Takes Guts! Ryota's Great Errand Strategy"; Transliteration: "Gattsu de Gō! Ryōta no Otsukai Daisakusen" (Japanese: ガッツでGO!亮太のおつかい大作戦)	Yasuo Yamayoshi	Ryō Kawasaki	Mitsuru Aoyama	Shōichirō Sugiura	October 31, 2004	February 27, 2010
As Nagisa and Honoka prepare to go shopping, Nagisa's father forgets some documents and asks her to deliver them to him. However, Ryouta offers to deliver them instead.
39	39	"Patching It Up" "Glittering Tears! Pouring Sweat! A Chaotic Wedding"; Transliteration: "Namida Kira! Ase ga Tara! Kekkonshiki wa Ōsōdō!!" (Japanese: 涙キラ!汗がタラ!結婚式は大騒動!!)	Takenori Kawada	Yumi Kageyama	Katsumi Tamegai	Shinzo Yuki & Tadami Shimokawa	November 14, 2004	March 13, 2010
After Yoshimi, the teacher of Nagisa and Honoka's class, announces that she is getting married, the class decides to give her a wedding gift.
40	40	"Sleepover Nightmare" "Invitation to a Dream World!? One-Night Journey Into Darkness"; Transliteration: "Yume no Sekai He go Shōtai!? Ippakufutsuka Yami no Tabi" (Japanese: 夢の世界へご招待!?一泊二日闇の旅)	Takao Iwai	Yoshimi Narita	Toshiharu Takahashi	Shinzo Yuki & Tomoko Ide	November 21, 2004	March 20, 2010
When Nagisa goes to Honoka's house for a sleepover, Belzei invades their dreams and turns them into a nightmare.
41	41	"Losing Isn't an Option" "We Won't Lose! Blow the Power of Darkness Away"; Transliteration: "Makenaittebā!! Yami no Chikara o Buttobase!" (Japanese: 負けないってばー!!闇の力をぶっとばせ!)	Hirotoshi Rissen	Higashi Shimizu	Shûichi Iijima	Shinzo Yuki & Tadami Shimokawa	November 28, 2004	March 27, 2010
Verone Academy competes against Otag Junior High in the finals of the lacrosse championship.
42	42	"Together, We Are One!" "We are One! Nagisa and Honoka's Powerful Bond"; Transliteration: "Futari wa Hitotsu! Nagisa to Honoka Saikyou no Kizuna" (Japanese: 二人はひとつ!なぎさとほのか最強の絆)	Daisuke Nishio & Akifumi Zako	Daisuke Habara	Masumi Hattori	Shōichirō Sugiura	December 5, 2004	April 3, 2010
The Dark Zone captures Honoka and Nagisa must rescue her before the darkness consumes her.
43	43	"Fergie's Birthday Brouhaha" "Extremely Shaken Up! My Feelings for Fuji-P-Senpai"; Transliteration: "Gekiyure Makuri! Fujipi-senpai ni Todoke Kono Omoi" (Japanese: 激揺れまくり!藤P先輩に届けこの想い)	Akinori Yabe	Yoshimi Narita	Miho Azuma	Shinzo Yuki & Tomoko Ide	December 12, 2004	April 10, 2010
Nagisa's friend Yui, who has a crush on Fujip, asks her for advice on how to confess her love to him. This upsets Nagisa because she also has feelings for him.
44	44	"A Holiday Visitor" "I Couldn't Be Happier!? Nagisa's White Christmas"; Transliteration: "Saikō Happī!? Nagisa no White Kurisumasu" (Japanese: 最高ハッピー!?なぎさのホワイトクリスマス)	Yasuo Yamayoshi	Ryō Kawasaki	Hiroyuki Kawano	Shinzo Yuki & Tadami Shimokawa	December 19, 2004	April 17, 2010
As winter vacation approaches, Verone Academy holds a Christmas dance.
45	45	"Choir Chaos" "Sing, Sakura Class! The Choir Shows Courage"; Transliteration: "Utae Sakura Kumi! Gasshō wa Yūki wo Nosete" (Japanese: 歌えさくら組!合唱は勇気を乗せて)	Takenori Kawada	Yumi Kageyama	Mitsuru Aoyama	Shinzo Yuki & Tomoko Ide	December 26, 2004	July 31, 2010
The eighth grade ensemble is representing Verone Academy at the district championships. At the last minute, Chiaki decides to change the song they will be singing, and Nagisa and Honoka try to convince the class that this was the right decision.
46	46	"A New Year Debacle" "It's the Pits! Has the Power of the Stones Been Stolen?"; Transliteration: "Saiaku! Ishi no Chikara ga Ubawareta!?" (Japanese: サイアク～! 石の力が奪われた～!?)	Tôru Yamada	Higashi Shimizu	Toshie Kawamura	Shōichirō Sugiura	January 9, 2005	July 31, 2010
Nagisa and Honoka are excited for the new year, but then the Dark Zone attacks, heaving learned that Pollun has the power of the Prism Stones within him.
47	47	"The Dark Zone Expedition" "The Most Powerful Warrior Appears! No Way!"; Transliteration: "Saikyō Senshi Toujou! tte mō, Arienai!!" (Japanese: 最強戦士登場!っても～ありえない!!)	Takao Iwai	Yumi Kageyama	Yasuhiro Namatame	Shinzo Yuki & Tadami Shimokawa	January 16, 2005	July 31, 2010
Nagisa and Honoka follow Juna, Regine and Belzei into the Dark Zone to rescue Wisdom and recover the Prism Stones. There, the Dark Seeds use the power of creation to fuse into a monstrous form in order to rebel against the Dark King. They overwhelm Nagisa and Honoka with their power until Kiriya suddenly returns to save them.
48	48	"Evil vs. Evil" "The Greatest Final Battle! Pretty Cure's Last Day!!"; Transliteration: "Shijōsaidai no Kessen! Purikyua Saigo no Hi!!" (Japanese: 史上最大の決戦!プリキュア最後の日!!)	Yamauchi Shigeyasu & Akifumi Zako	Ryō Kawasaki	Toshiharu Takahashi	Shinzo Yuki & Tomoko Ide	January 23, 2005	July 31, 2010
As the Dark Seeds battle the Dark King, who is enraged at their betrayal, Kiriya reveals to Nagisa and Honoka that after his defeat, he was stuck in between light and darkness until he was revived. They offer him to come live with them on Earth, but he refuses, saying that as a being of darkness, he will never be able to live in the light. Although they try to fight the Dark King, they are overwhelmed after he absorbs the Dark Seeds to gain the power of creation and begins to attack Earth and the Garden of Light.
49	49	"Fight for the Future" "Believe in the Future! Believe in Tomorrow! We Won't Let You Say Goodbye!!"; Transliteration: "Mirai o Shinjite! Ashita o Shinjite! Sayonara Nante Iwasenai!!" (Japanese: 未来を信じて! 明日[あした]を信じて! さよならなんて言わせない!!)	Akinori Yabe	Yoshimi Narita	Shûichi Iijima	Tomoko Yoshida	January 30, 2005	July 31, 2010
Nagisa and Honoka fight the Dark King to prevent him from consuming the universe in darkness, and defeat him with power from Pollun. Afterwards, life returns to normal as Verone Academy's third-year students graduate and Mepple, Mipple, and Pollun go into a hibernation-like state. As well, Kiriya, who disappeared after the Dark King was killed, is implied to have been reborn as a human.
