= List of Pretty Cure Max Heart episodes =

- Season 2
- No. of episodes: 47

Release
- Original network: ANN (ABC)
- Original release: February 6, 2005 – January 29, 2006

Series chronology
- ← Previous; Pretty Cure Next → PreCure Splash Star

Pretty Cure Max Heart is the second season of Pretty Cure and the second Pretty Cure anime television series. The story continues from the first season; Nagisa Misumi and Honoka Yukishiro regain the power of Pretty Cure, and are joined by a new girl, Hikari Kujou, who can transform into Shiny Luminous. Together, they fight against the remnants of the Dark Zone and to collect the Heartiels to resurrect the Queen of Light. The season aired in Japan from February 6, 2005, to January 29, 2006, replacing the first season in its initial timeslot and was succeeded by PreCure Splash Star. The opening theme is "Danzen! Futari wa Pretty Cure (Max Heart ver.)" (DANZEN!ふたりはプリキュア (ver. MaxHeart)?) by Mayumi Gojo. The first ending theme, used for episodes 1-36, is "Muri Muri!? Ari Ari!! In jaa Na~i?!" (ムリムリ!?ありあり!!INじゃあな～い?!?, "No way!? Unbeliveable!! Is that Okay?!") by Mayumi Gojo with Young Fresh, whilst the second ending theme, used for episodes 37-47 is "Wonder Winter Yatta" (ワンダーウィンターヤッタ Wandā Wintā Yatta?, "Wonder Winter Alright") by Gojo.

== Episode list ==
No. overall	No. in season	Title	Directed by	Written by	Animation directed by	Art directed by	Original release date
50	1	"We are still Pretty Cure~! The Legend Continues through Thick and Thin!"; Transliteration: "Yappari Futari wa Purikkyua~! Densetsu wa Tsuzukuyo Dokomademo" (Japanese: やっぱりふたりはプリッキュア～! 伝説は続くよどこまでも!)	Toshiaki Komura	Ryō Kawasaki	Mitsuru Aoyama	Shinzo Yuki & Hiromitsu Shiozaki	February 6, 2005
Life goes on for Nagisa and Honoka after defeating the Dark King, with them still carrying their Card Communes, despite Mipple and Mepple being inactive, so they will be with them. Meanwhile, the Queen of the Garden of Light, who has been injured by the Dark King's attack, separates into her life, her heart, and the twelve Heartiels. On their way home, Nagisa and Honoka meet a mysterious girl by a river, but she soon disappears. When a Zakenna attacks, Mipple and Mepple reawaken and Nagisa and Honoka regain their powers as Pretty Cure with new strength. They defeat the Zakenna and Nagisa returns home to find the Elder, the Guardian and an awakened Pollun at her house. They explain what happened and introduce her to Seekun, the first of the Heartiels.
51	2	"The Freshman is a Profound Mystery!? But She is really full of Riddles"; Transliteration: "Shin'nyusei wa Makafushigi!? Hakkiri Itte Nazo Darake" (Japanese: 新入生は摩訶不思議!? はっきりいって謎だらけ!)	Yasuo Yamayoshi	Yoshimi Narita	Hiroyuki Kawano	Shōichirō Sugiura	February 13, 2005
The mysterious girl, Hikari Kujou, transfers to Nagisa and Honoka's school.
52	3	"Could this be Destiny? Pollun and Hikari's Approaching Encounter!!"; Transliteration: "Korette Unmei? Porun to Hikari Sekkin Sougou!!" (Japanese: これって運命? ポルンとひかり接近遭遇!!)	Takenori Kawada	Yumi Kageyama	Masumi Hattori	Shinzo Yuki, Tomoko Ide & Hiromitsu Shiozaki	February 20, 2005
Hikari meets Pollun and later witnesses Nagisa and Honoka transform into Pretty Cure and defeat a Zakenna.
53	4	"You are not alone! A Premonition that Two Moods Overlap"; Transliteration: "Hitorijanai! Futatsu no Kimochi ga Kasanaru Yokan" (Japanese: 独りじゃない! 二つの気持ちが重なる予感!)	Tôru Yamada	Higashi Shimizu	Miho Azuma	Tomoko Yoshida	February 27, 2005
Hikari is still thinking about the events of the previous day and who she is. She asks Nagisa and Honoka what Pretty Cure is, but runs away before they can explain. When Circulas attacks, she and Pollun are surrounded by a pillar of light.
54	5	"A Gallant Appearance! Her Name is Shiny Luminous!"; Transliteration: "Sassō Tōjō! So no Na wa Shainī Ruminasu!" (Japanese: 颯爽登場! その名はシャイニールミナス!)	Takao Iwai	Ryō Kawasaki	Toshie Kawamura	Shinzo Yuki & Hiromitsu Shiozaki	March 6, 2005
Pollun transforms into the Touch Commune, which Hikari uses to transform into Shiny Luminous and help Nagisa and Honoka fight the Zakenna. They begin to wonder if she could be the Queen.
55	6	"Be Careful! Hikari's Errand Peril is a Defeat"; Transliteration: "Kiwotsukete! Hikari no Otsukai Kiken ga Ippai" (Japanese: 気をつけて! ひかりのお使い危険がいっぱい)	Akinori Yabe	Yumi Kageyama	Yasuhiro Namatame	Takashi Kurahashi	March 13, 2005
Akane sends Hikari to go shopping with Nagisa and Honoka and although she gets lost, she manages to finish the shopping. However, Uraganos attacks them on their way home. Pation, the second Heartiel, also appears.
56	7	"Fight, Nagisa! The Prodigious Power of Housework at the Scene of a Fire"; Transliteration: "Faito da Nagisa! Kaji de Kajiba no Baka Chikara" (Japanese: ファイトだなぎさ! 家事で火事場の馬鹿力!)	Toshiaki Komura	Yoshimi Narita	Toshiharu Takahashi	Shinzo Yuki & Tomoko Ide	March 20, 2005
Nagisa's mother goes to her high school reunion and tasks Nagisa with doing the housework, which Honoka helps her with.
57	8	"Let your Worries Drive off! Link Hikari's Ties with Everyone!"; Transliteration: "Nayami Buttobi! Hikari wo Musubu Minna no Kizuna" (Japanese: 悩みぶっ飛び! ひかりを結ぶみんなの絆)	Akifumi Zako	Daisuke Habara	Mitsuru Aoyama	Shōichirō Sugiura	March 27, 2005
Nakao, Akane's co-worker, tells her to close the Tako Cafe and return to her original job, but the Cures help to convince her not to close the cafe.
58	9	"Do not Disturb! Honoka's Most Important Day"; Transliteration: "Jama Sasenai! Honoka no Ichiban Taisetsu no Hi" (Japanese: 邪魔させない! ほのかの一番大切な日)	Takenori Kawada	Higashi Shimizu	Shûichi Iijima	Shinzo Yuki	April 3, 2005
On Honoka's birthday, her parents come to visit her after being away at work and go out to eat at a French restaurant. However, the power goes out when Viblis attacks. Harmonin, the third Heartiel, also appears.
59	10	"On the verge of Panic! Don't Take this Dangerous Field Trip Practice Seriously!"; Transliteration: "Panikku Sunzen! Amakute Kiken na Kengaku Jishuu" (Japanese: パニック寸前! 甘くて危険な見学実習)	Yasuo Yamayoshi	Ryō Kawasaki	Hiroyuki Kawano	Tomoko Yoshida	April 10, 2005
Nagisa and Honoka's class goes on a field trip to a cake factory, where Viblis attacks.
60	11	"Big Pinch! Don't Hang Your Heart in this One-shot Turnaround!!"; Transliteration: "Dai Pinchi! Haato wo Tsunai de Ippatsu Gyakuten!!" (Japanese: 大ピンチ! ハートをつないで一発逆転!!)	Tôru Yamada	Yoshimi Narita	Masumi Hattori	Shōichirō Sugiura	April 17, 2005
The lacrosse team is scheduled to compete against another school in the lacrosse championship. However, after a falling out between two of their members causes the team to lose, Nagisa tries to help them work together. When Viblis attacks, Hikari is unable to fight the Zakenna until Nagisa and Honoka arrive to help her.
61	12	"Business Prosperity! Welcome the Cafe's Plateau"; Transliteration: "Shōbai Hanjō! Kōgen no Kafe e Irasshai" (Japanese: 商売繁盛! 高原のカフェへいらっしゃい)	Takao Iwai	Yumi Kageyama	Toshie Kawamura	Shinzo Yuki & Hiromitsu Shiozaki	April 24, 2005
Akane takes Nagisa, Honoka, and Hikari to a festival in the highlands as thanks for their work at Tako Cafe.
62	13	"Nagisa's Great Parent-Child Battle? Neglecting a Mother's Heart!?"; Transliteration: "Nagisa Oyako de Dai Batoru? Haha no Kokoro Koshirazu!?" (Japanese: なぎさ親子で大バトル? 母のココロ子知らず!?)	Akinori Yabe	Daisuke Habara	Miho Azuma	Takashi Kurahashi	May 1, 2005
Nagisa has an argument with her mother and tries to reconcile with her after a conversation with her father makes her realize the struggles she has gone through to raise her. The fourth Heartiel, Pyuan, also appears.
63	14	"Go For It, Fuji-P-senpai! Nagisa's Cheering Flag Of Spirit"; Transliteration: "Fujipi-senpai Ganba! Nagisa Kiai no Ouenki" (Japanese: 藤P先輩ガンバ! なぎさ気合いの応援旗)	Toshiaki Komura	Higashi Shimizu	Yasuhiro Namatame	Shinzo Yuki & Yukiko Iijima	May 8, 2005
Fujipi's soccer team has a match against another school and Nagisa, Honoka and Hikari go to cheer them on. When Circulas attacks, they leave the game to fight the Zakenna and prevent him from disrupting the game. Afterwards, Nagisa, Honoka, and Hikari return to the match, and Nagisa uses the flag she made to cheer on Fujipi. The Verone team wins the match and he thanks Nagisa for the flag.
64	15	"The Upperclassman You Admire is Your Super Close Friend!?"; Transliteration: "Akogare no Senpai wa Daishinyū!?" (Japanese: あこがれの先輩は大親友!?)	Hirotoshi Rissen, Daisuke Nishio & Takashi Otsuka	Ryō Kawasaki	Toshiharu Takahashi	Shōichirō Sugiura	May 15, 2005
Hikari goes out with her friends Nao and Miu, while Honoka studies in a library and Nagisa goes to a bakery to get bread for her mother. They meet in the same area and Nao convinces Nagisa to play basketball with a group of boys.
65	16	"Nagisa's in High Spirits! The Lucky Color is in the Yellow!"; Transliteration: "Nagisa Norinori! Rakkī Karā de zekkōchō!!" (Japanese: なぎさノリノリ! ラッキーカラーで絶好調!!)	Takenori Kawada	Yoshimi Narita	Shûichi Iijima	Takashi Kurahashi	May 22, 2005
Shiho and Rina tell Nagisa that her horoscope predicts a good week for her and that her lucky color is yellow. Nagisa does not believe them, but after a series of good events, she decides not to study for her mid-term exams and to rely on her luck instead. During the test, Uraganos attacks and Nagisa, Honoka and Hikari fight the Zakenna. Afterwards, they find another Heartiel called Intelligen, who was pleased with Honoka's hard work. When Nagisa gets her test papers, she learns that she scored poorly and realizes that she was foolish to believe in luck.
66	17	"What's This!? The Distressed Honoka's Meeting for Reading Research Papers"; Transliteration: "Dousuru!? Nayameru Honoka no Kenkyūhappyōkai" (Japanese: どうする!? 悩めるほのかの研究発表会)	Yasuo Yamayoshi	Daisuke Habara	Hiroyuki Kawano	Midori Tanaka	May 29, 2005
The science fair is coming up, and Honoka and the science club are not sure what theme to use, so they reuse the lightning theme they used last year. Honoka feels that it is not the right choice and eventually changes the theme to "Trash and Us". On the day of the science fair, Uraganos attacks with a Zakenna.
67	18	"Camping, 'Hoy! Becoming reliant on Daddy!?"; Transliteration: "Kyanpu da Hoi! Tayori ni naru no wa Otousan!?" (Japanese: キャンプだホイ! 頼りになるのはお父さん!?)	Tôru Yamada	Yumi Kageyama	Masumi Hattori	Yukiko Iijima	June 5, 2005
Nagisa and Honoka's families go on a camping trip, and Hikari joins them later. After Chuutaro runs away, the Cures chase after him, only to find Uraganos. They defeat the Zakenna and return to Nagisa's parents, but cannot go to the waterfall because Nagisa's father is worried about the rain. Intelligen gives notepads to Nagisa, Honoka and Hikari before entering the Chairect.
68	19	"Hikari is worried! Nagisa's Changing Schools--No Way!!"; Transliteration: "Hikari Komatta! Nagisa ga Tenkou Arienai!!" (Japanese: ひかり困った! なぎさが転校ありえない!!)	Takao Iwai	Higashi Shimizu	Toshie Kawamura	Shōichirō Sugiura	June 12, 2005
When Nagisa overhears her father talking about moving to Osaka, she worries about Honoka and Hikari's reaction to the news. She later learns that it was her father's boss who was moving, but Hikari thinks that Nagisa is moving and struggles to tell Honoka.
69	20	"Namida's Farewell!? Rina's Ponpoko Tale"; Transliteration: "Namida no owakare!? Rina no Ponpoko Monogatari" (Japanese: ナミダのお別れ!? 莉奈のポンポコ物語)	Akinori Yabe	Daisuke Habara	Mitsuru Aoyama	Yukiko Iijima	June 26, 2005
Nagisa, Honoka and Shiho notice that Rina has been acting strangely, and after following her, they learn that she has been taking care of a baby raccoon. Meanwhile, the boy in the mansion asks the Zakenna butlers if he can go outside. When Nagisa, Honoka and Hikari look after the raccoon, Viblis attacks with a Zakenna and the raccoon is injured, but they defeat it.
70	21	"So soon? So often!? A Forbidden Encounter"; Transliteration: "Do~naru? Do~suru!? Kinjirareta Deai" (Japanese: ど～なる?ど～する!? 禁じられた出会い)	Akifumi Zako	Yoshimi Narita	Katsumi Tamegai	Takashi Kurahashi	July 3, 2005
Circulas, Uraganos and Viblis allow the boy to leave the mansion, with the Zakenna butlers following him to protect him. Meanwhile, Hikari meets a boy named Daiki, and they go for a walk together, during which she encounters the boy from the mansion, causing reality to warp and the street to darken. The boy sees Hikari as Shiny Luminous and faints, leaving the butlers to wake him up while Viblis leaves with them and Circulas attacks Nagisa and Honoka, but they defeat the Zakenna. Later that night, Hikari and the boy wonder who they saw when they met.
71	22	"The Horror of Baldez! Pretty Cure Cornered"; Transliteration: "Kyōfu no Barudesu! Oitsumerareta Purikyua" (Japanese: 恐怖のバルデス! 追いつめられたプリキュア)	Toshiaki Komura	Higashi Shimizu	Miho Azuma	Shōichirō Sugiura	July 10, 2005
Baldez attacks the Cures, but retreats after their Marble Screw Max and Extreme Luminario are ineffective against him. Later, Seekun brings Intelligen out of the Chairect to aid them using the Book of Wisdom. She tells them that there is a shining piece of earth on Earth that is located near two suns. Honoka realizes that this was the same place where Mepple dropped the Prism Hopish, and they go to look for it.
72	23	"Rebound the Dark Powers! Hope Uncovers a New Power!!"; Transliteration: "Yami no Chikara o Hanekaese! Kibō ga Kureta Arata na Chikara!!" (Japanese: 闇の力をはね返せ! 希望がくれた新たな力!!)	Takenori Kawada	Ryō Kawasaki	Yasuhiro Namatame	Midori Tanaka	July 17, 2005
The Cures go to Lake Hyoutan with Seekun and Intelligen to search for the 'shining piece of earth surrounded by six pillars'. They find it and call upon the power to create from the Garden of Light to send it to Earth. However, Baldez attacks and interrupts the power to create, causing the shining piece of earth to disappear. The Cures transform and fight Baldez, but are overpowered. The six-pillared area begins to glow with light and they receive the "Sparkle Bracelets", which power up the Marble Screw Max and allow them to defeat Baldez. After this, Intelligen returns to the Chairect.
73	24	"Adolescent Full Throttle! Yuka-sempai and Nagisa's Top Deciding Battle!"; Transliteration: "Seijun Zenkai! Yuka-senpai to Nagisa no Chōjō Kessen!!" (Japanese: 青春全開! 友華先輩となぎさの頂上決戦!!)	Yasuo Yamayoshi	Yumi Kageyama	Toshiharu Takahashi	Yukiko Iijima	August 7, 2005
It is summer camp for Verone Academy, and Nagisa and Honoka prepare to lead their clubs, with Hikari and Yuka joining them. Later on, Nagisa asks Yuka to play lacrosse with the team. During the game, Nagisa faints and Honoka, Hikari, and Yuka take care of her. After Nagisa wakes up, Uraganos attacks, but they defeat the Zakenna using the Marble Screw Max Sparkle.
74	25	"Hikari's Summer Day, Sanae's Reminiscence"; Transliteration: "Hikari no Natsu no Hi Sanae no Omoide" (Japanese: ひかりの夏の日 さなえの思い出)	Tôru Yamada	Ryō Kawasaki	Shûichi Iijima	Shōichirō Sugiura	August 14, 2005
Nagisa, Honoka, Hikari and Honoka's grandmother go to a lake for a boat ride. Meanwhile, Viblis ponders about the disappearance of Baldez and Uraganos and decides to attack the Cures, but they defeat the Zakenna using the Marble Screw Max Sparkle.
75	26	"Nagisa Defeated! Everyone is Worried and Greatly Afraid!!"; Transliteration: "Makeru na Nagisa! Minna Nayan de Ōkiku Natta!!" (Japanese: 負けるななぎさ! みんな悩んで大きくなった!!)	Takao Iwai	Higashi Shimizu	Hiroyuki Kawano	Midori Tanaka	August 21, 2005
Nagisa and Honoka celebrate the summer festival as Nagisa confides in Honoka about her uncertainty about her future. They go to the top of a hill to watch the fireworks, where Fujipi joins her and she tells him about her problems. When Viblis attacks, the Cures defeat the Zakenna, and afterwards Nagisa learns from Fujipi that he does not know what his dreams are, but will find them one day.
76	27	"Don't finish your Homework Yet! Pears and Storms and Zakennah!!"; Transliteration: "Nokotta Shukutai Katadukero! Nashi to Arashi to Zakennā!!" (Japanese: 残った宿題片付けろ! 梨と嵐とザケンナー!!)	Akinori Yabe	Daisuke Habara	Mitsuru Aoyama	Takashi Kurahashi	August 28, 2005
After finishing her homework, Nagisa realizes that she has to do her independent research before school starts again. Akane tells Nagisa, Honoka, and Hikari that she is going to visit a pear orchard for a new addition to the menu, and Nagisa decides to accompany her while doing her research. There, they meet the couple who owns the pear orchard and start harvesting pears. Viblis attacks them, but the Cures defeat the Zakenna and they finish the harvest.
77	28	"Verone Panic! The Naughty Ghost-Hunting Princess"; Transliteration: "Verōne Panikku! Wanpaku Ōjo no Obake Taiji" (Japanese: ベローネパニック! わんぱく王女のお化け退治)	Toshiaki Komura	Ryō Kawasaki	Toshie Kawamura	Yukiko Iijima	September 4, 2005
Rumors begin to spread at school that the ghost of Ruriko is haunting the school. Nagisa and Honoka do not believe this, but after a series of events, Nagisa is frightened at the possibility that there is a real ghost. When Circulas attacks, as they are fighting him a creature named Lulun appears, who is the princess of light and "weaves the future". Afterwards, they learn that Lulun was behind the events and that Akane made up the story of Ruriko when she was in school.
78	29	"No Way...Seriously...Really? Pollun's Great Babysitter Strategy!"; Transliteration: "Usomajihonto? Porun no Komori Daisakusen!" (Japanese: ウソマジホント? ポルンの子守り大作戦!)	Takenori Kawada	Higashi Shimizu	Miho Azuma	Shōichirō Sugiura	September 11, 2005
Nagisa takes Lulun to her house, but she is upset and wants to be with Pollun. When they return her to Hikari, a boy and his sister, Arisa (アリサ; voiced by Miyuki Sawashiro) walks by. Arisa tells her brother that he left her teddy bear at the park, so he tells her to stay with Hikari while he looks for it. However, she is sad and runs away. As Hikari chases after her, Uraganos attacks and captures Luminous, but Lulun uses her power to free her. Afterwards, the boy gives Arisa her teddy bear and leaves while thanking Hikari for looking after her.
79	30	"Do your best, Lulun! Weave the Future with the Power of Light!!"; Transliteration: "Ganbare Rurun! Mirai o Tsumugu Hikari no Chikara!!" (Japanese: 頑張れルルン! 未来を紡ぐ光の力!!)	Yasuo Yamayoshi	Daisuke Habara	Yasuhiro Namatame	Shinzo Yuki	September 18, 2005
Nagisa and Honoka take Hikari and Lulun to the amusement park, and Nagisa talks about the events that happened there, including her and Honoka transforming into Pretty Cure for the first time. Lulun sees a balloon and chases after it, and while they are looking for her, Circulas attacks and captures her. During the battle, Luminous and Lulun's pendants resonate, creating the Heartiel Brooch, which increases her power and helps them defeat the Zakenna.
80	31	"Baldez Reborn! Break Through with Teamwork at the Last Second!!"; Transliteration: "Barudesu Fukkatsu! Chīmuwāku de Girigiri Toppa!!" (Japanese: バルデス復活! チームワークでギリギリ突破!!)	Akifumi Zako	Higashi Shimizu	Toshiharu Takahashi	Midori Tanaka	September 25, 2005
Verone Academy is scheduled to compete with Kakatouan in the lacrosse tournament, but performs poorly in the first half. Viblis attacks and sends Nagisa, Honoka, and Hikari to an isolated lacrosse field with Circulas and Uraganos. Afterwards, the teams are tied 3-3, and Nagisa scores to win the tournament for her team. A new Heartiel, Bravun, joins Seekun.
81	32	"Protect us from Darkness! This World's Most Important Smile!"; Transliteration: "Yami Kara Mamore! Kono Sekai de Ichiban Daiji na Egao!!" (Japanese: 闇から守れ! この世で一番大事な笑顔!!)	Tôru Yamada	Yū Yoshimura	Mitsuru Aoyama	Shōichirō Sugiura	October 2, 2005
Nagisa forgets to write an article for the newspaper, so Honoka takes her, Shiho and Rina to Mitayo, who owns an odango shop. They interview her and learn that she is going to close the shop soon. Honoka volunteers to write the article, and after reading it, Mitayo begins to wonder about the future of her shop. On the day of the newspaper distribution, Viblis attacks the group as they come to eat, but they defeat the Zakenna. Afterwards, more people visit the odango shop, and Mitayo decides to continue with her business.
82	33	"Stock up your Courage! Nagisa's Troublesome Birthday!!"; Transliteration: "Yūki wo Dashite! Nagisa Haran no Bāsudē!!" (Japanese: 勇気を出して! なぎさ波乱のバースデー!!)	Takao Iwai	Ryō Kawasaki	Shûichi Iijima	Yumi Hosaka	October 9, 2005
On Nagisa's birthday, she goes out with Honoka and Hikari to look at cosmo flowers, and she works up the courage to tell Fujipi her true feelings. However, Uraganos attacks and interrupts her, but they defeat the Zakenna. Afterwards, Nagisa tries to tell Fujipi her true feelings, but instead tells him that she will support them, and Bravun enters the Chairect.
83	34	"Friends on a Journey! Zakennah on a Field Trip!?"; Transliteration: "Tabi da Nakama da! Shūgaku Ryokō da Zakennā!?" (Japanese: 旅だ仲間だ! 修学旅行だザケンナー!?)	Akinori Yabe	Yumi Kageyama	Hiroyuki Kawano	Yukiko Iijima	October 16, 2005
On the first day of the trip, Nagisa and Honoka visit some of Kyoto's most notable sights. Nagisa wins two tickets in a lottery, giving her and Honoka the chance to see an Edo drama. Meanwhile, Hikari is worried after a series of strange events, and Wishun comes out of the Chairect to tell her that "the truth is coming"; later, she and the boy in the mansion encounter each other again. Uraganos attacks Nagisa and Honoka as they are looking at the props, but they defeat the Zakenna. Afterwards, they worry about what to do with Hikari as a Heartiel is seen sitting on a pole.
84	35	"A Seriously Dangerous Field Trip! Lovely Sliced Fish has a Dangerous Smell"; Transliteration: "Majiyaba Shūgaku Ryokō! Omoide Zukuri wa Kiken na Kaori" (Japanese: マジヤバ修学旅行! 思い出作りは危険な香り)	Takashi Otsuka	Daisuke Habara	Toshie Kawamura	Shōichirō Sugiura	October 23, 2005
On the second day of the field trip, the boy from the mansion is sightseeing in Kyoto as Shiho, Rina, and Nagisa go out in town and visit the souvenir store. Honoka and Hikari meet up with them and they travel to a mountainside area and split up. Nagisa, Honoka, and Hikari find Prosen, but Uraganos attacks and Wishun tells them that the "truth" is almost there. Hikari and the boy from the mansion encounter each other again, causing their surroundings to be covered by darkness and them to suddenly faint. Viblis takes the boy away as Uraganos attacks again, but they defeat the Zakenna. Afterwards, they begin heading home from the field trip.
85	36	"Return to the Pit! Pollun and Lulun's Great Adventure"; Transliteration: "Ōchi ni Kaeshite~! Porun to Rurun no Daibōken" (Japanese: おうちに帰して～! ポルンとルルンの大冒険)	Takenori Kawada	Yoshimi Narita	Miho Azuma	Shinzo Yuki	October 30, 2005
When Lulun runs off, Pollun follows after her and tries to take her back to the tako cafe. A girl, thinking that they are teddy bears, takes Pollun and Lulun home. Meanwhile, Hikari looks for Pollun and Lulun along with Seekun and Prosen. At the girl's house, she plays with Pollun and Lulun and her mother asks her if she wants to come with her to pick up her father, but she refuses and takes out a broken toy car belonging to her father. The girl takes Pollun and Lulun with her to the park, where Pollun tells her to have courage. As Nagisa, Honoka, and Hikari search for Pollun and Lulun in the park, Viblis attacks, but they defeat the Zakenna. The girl's parents find the girl and she tells her father about the car. He says to her that she is more important than the car and as soon as she shows him Pollun and Lulun, Nagisa, Honoka and Hikari asks for them. At first the girl is sad but she gives them away and says goodbye to them.
86	37	"Nagisa's Flying! Honoka's Dancing! Feel the Power of the Harvest on the Great Stage!"; Transliteration: "Nagisa Tobu! Honoka Maiu! Shiho Zenryoku no Ōbutai!" (Japanese: なぎさ飛ぶ!ほのか舞う! 志穂全力の大舞台!)	Yasuo Yamayoshi	Higashi Shimizu	Toshiharu Takahashi	Midori Tanaka	November 13, 2005
At the Verone Festival, Shiho directs a play in hopes of fulfilling her dream of becoming a movie director. Nagisa volunteers to be the main character, while Honoka volunteers to be the enemy. During rehearsals, Nagisa struggles with wire lifting, and Shiho is worried about her while Nagisa feels bad about being unable to do it properly. On the day of the Verone Festival, Uraganos attacks and puts everyone to sleep. While Nagisa and Honoka transform and fight Uraganos and several Zakennas that merge into a larger Zakenna, Hikari transforms into Luminous and helps them defeat the Zakenna. Afterwards, Rina is worried about their lack of rehearsal, but Nagisa's plan works and the play goes well. Afterwards, Seekun is seen with a new Heartiel, Happinen.
87	38	"Goodbye, Honoka!? Our Bonds will Intensify Forever!"; Transliteration: "Sayonara Honoka!? Kizuna wa Kataku Eien ni!" (Japanese: さよならほのか!? 絆は固く永遠に!)	Naoyuki Itō	Daisuke Habara	Yasuhiro Namatame	Shinzo Yuki	November 20, 2005
Honoka receives a postcard from her mother, which asks her if she wants to move to Paris as part of her work. Honoka feels worried and tells Nagisa and Hikari about this, and they become concerned about what life would be like without her. The next day, Nagisa visits Honoka and Circulas attacks as they are playing catch with their lacrosse sticks, but they defeat the Zakenna. Afterwards, Honoka decides not to go to Paris and tells her parents that she is happy where she is.
88	39	"Burn out! The Young Lacrosse Finalist!!"; Transliteration: "Moetsukiro! Seijun Rakurosu Kesshōsen!!" (Japanese: 燃え尽きろ! 青春ラクロス決勝戦!!)	Tôru Yamada	Ryō Kawasaki	Shûichi Iijima	Shōichirō Sugiura	November 27, 2005
It is the lacrosse championship between Verone and Otagaku and Otagaku's captain, Katsuko Nagasawa (永沢 勝子, Nagasawa Katsuko; voiced by Fumiko Orikasa), meets Nagisa and she takes her to the tako cafe with Honoka, Shiho, and Rina. They talk about their experience of playing lacrosse and why they chose it, but Nagisa does not remember why she chose it. On the day of the championship, Nagasawa informs her team about their planned formation. At the end of the match, Nagasawa is annoyed at Nagisa's team being happy, but realises that lacrosse made her happy, so she praises her teammates and tells them to do their best. As the second half starts, Uraganos, Viblis and Circulas attack and they fight them and the Zakenna. After the fight, Nagisa returns to the game and manages to score and win the match. Nagasawa congratulates her and praises her for her good play.
89	40	"Together, We are the Best! Full-Powered Rippin' Roarin' Nagisa and Ryouta!!"; Transliteration: "Futari wa Saikō! Zenkai Baribari Nagisa to Ryōta!!" (Japanese: ふたりは最高! 全開バリバリなぎさと亮太!!)	Takao Iwai	Yū Yoshimura	Mitsuru Aoyama	Shinzo Yuki	December 4, 2005
Ryouta joins a higher level badminton club, which Nagisa takes him to. There he meets Honoka and they go to the court, where he and Fuujji are paired with Takabada and his partner. Although Ryouta was annoyed by her cheering for him, Nagisa continues to support him. The match starts and Takabada beats Ryouta and Fuujji 7:0. Honoka, who can tell that he is upset, and Nagisa call for a time-out and she advises him to enjoy badminton like in his younger days. However, Pollun senses evil and Viblis takes Nagisa, Honoka and Hikari to a dark version of the badminton court. As Viblis prepares to attack Luminous, the boy in the mansion yells at her to stop, and Baldez takes her away. They then return to the badminton court and watch the match. Although Takabada and his partner win, the badminton teacher tells Ryouta and Fuujji that they can stay because he wants people who enjoy badminton.
90	41	"Deliver your Spirit! A Wandering Present of Courage!!"; Transliteration: "Kihaku de watase! Chokotto yūki no present!!" (Japanese: 気迫で渡せ! ちょこっと勇気のプレゼント!!)	Yuriko Kado	Yumi Kageyama	Toshie Kawamura	Yukiko Iijima	December 11, 2005
On Fujipi's birthday, Nagisa is determined to get him a present, but cannot decide what to get him. Later, at Honoka's suggestion, she buys a towel to give him something he will use often. On the day of his birthday, Nagisa learns that his soccer team is at the municipal fields and tries to find him. Meanwhile, Mipple senses the presence of darkness and they search for Nagisa. When they find her, Baldez attacks and summons a Zakenna, which they defeat. Although the gift is damaged, Honoka and Hikari repair it and Nagisa gives the gift to Fujipi.
91	42	"A Rink Full of Sweethearts? Slipping and Falling into Grave Danger!"; Transliteration: "Ginban no Koibitotachi? Subette Koron de Dai Pinchi!" (Japanese: 銀盤の恋人たち? 滑って転んで大ピンチ!)	Akinori Yabe	Ryō Kawasaki	Hiroyuki Kawano	Shinzo Yuki	December 18, 2005
Fujipi invites Nagisa to a day out at the amusement park and she is happy to be with him, but learns that Honoka and Kimata are coming with him. They go ice skating and Nagisa struggles until Fujipi helps her. Meanwhile, Hikari and the boy in the mansion see each other through a Christmas decoration, but Baldez destroys it. When Nagisa, Honoka, Fujipi, and Kimata go on a Ferris Wheel, Nagisa tries to ask Fujipi how he feels about her, but the darkness causes him to fall asleep. Uraganos attacks and summons a Zakenna, but they defeat it with the Marble Screw Max Sparkle. Afterwards, everyone meets up at a café and Nagisa volunteers to collect the food. She blurts out that she loves Fujipi, but after realizing that he did not hear her, she instead tells him that she wished him a merry Christmas.
92	43	"The Final Winter Vacation! It's a Special Lesson for Zakennah!?"; Transliteration: "Saigo no Fuyuyasumi! Tokubetsu Jugyō da Zakennā!?" (Japanese: 最後の冬休み! 特別授業だザケンナー!?)	Takenori Kawada	Yumi Kageyama	Miho Azuma	Yukiko Iijima	December 25, 2005
NNagisa and Honoka think about their time as leaders of their clubs when they see the new captain, Maki, who is worried that the group is falling apart and asks Nagisa for advice. Shiho and Rina tell Nagisa to come to school tomorrow, while Yuriko tells Honoka the same thing, but both do not tell them why. At the Tako Café, Akane tells Hikari to check the supplies in the fridge, but she sees the Dark Zone through the fridge just like the boy in the mansion sees the Garden of Light through his window. The next day, Nagisa and Honoka meet at school and find out that the students of the science club and the lacrosse team are having a farewell party in the science classroom. Akane and Hikari present them with a cake and some takoyaki they made, and the new captains of the lacrosse team and the science club give them flowers. Just as Yuriko takes a picture of everyone, darkness arrives and causes everyone to fall asleep. After defeating the Zakenna that Viblis summoned, they return to the party.
93	44	"The Day Hikari Disappears, The Day We Search for Tomorrow!"; Transliteration: "Hikari ga Kieta Hi, Ashita o Sagasu Hi!" (Japanese: ひかりが消えた日 明日[あした]を探す日!)	Yasuo Yamayoshi	Higashi Shimizu	Toshiharu Takahashi	Shinzo Yuki	January 8, 2006
Circulas, Viblis, Uraganos and Baldez discuss the day of the Dark King's resurrection, while in the Garden of Light, the Elder learns that the balance between the two worlds is being affected by the power of darkness. At the Tako Café, Akane goes to check on Hikari, but finds that she is missing and the darkness arrives along with Circulas, Viblis, and Uraganos, and Nagisa and Honoka struggle to fight them without Luminous. Meanwhile, Hikari finds herself in a dark place and meets the boy from the mansion, who tells her that he was not responsible for bringing her here as she thought, and that he is worried about who he is, but she comforts him. Nagisa and Honoka defeat Circulas, Viblis, and Uraganos, who flee.
94	45	"Infinite Darkness, Eternal Light"; Transliteration: "Mugen no Yami, Eien no Hikari" (Japanese: 無限の闇 永遠の光)	Akifumi Zako	Yoshimi Narita	Yasuhiro Namatame	Yukiko Iijima	January 15, 2006
After Hikari's disappearance, Nagisa and Honoka learn that others' memories of her have been erased. In the Garden of Light, the Elder explains to Wisdom that the darkness is consuming other worlds and that it could consume Earth. Hikari and the boy find themselves in the Dark Zone and, when he tries to help her to her feet, beams of light and darkness emit from their hands. Baldez attacks and tells Luminous that he is responsible for the Dark King's resurrection and that the world will be covered in darkness. They see a hole in the sky, and Pollun tells Nagisa and Honoka that Hikari is in it. Pollun and Lulun think strongly about Hikari, which takes them into the hole and breaks the balance of light and darkness. A new Heartiel, Eternalun, appears, and Mepple identifies as the final Heartiel. Nagisa asks him what to do, and he tells them that the answer is in their hearts before entering the Chairect. The boy, Circulas, Uraganos, Viblis, and Baldez arrive and Baldez thanks Luminous for giving the boy the power to resurrect the Dark King. Nagisa and Honoka transform to fight them, but are defeated, and Hikari transforms and tells the boy that she will save him. Meanwhile, the chains from the Dark King spread out and begin to destroy the city.
95	46	"Life-risking Attack! Dark Soldiers at Maximum Power!!"; Transliteration: "Sutemi no Sōkōgeki! Yami no Senshi Makkusu Pawā!!" (Japanese: 捨て身の攻撃! 闇の戦士マックスパワー!!)	Naoyuki Itō	Higashi Shimizu	Shûichi Iijima	Shōichirō Sugiura	January 22, 2006
Nagisa and Honoka fight Circulas, Viblis and Uraganos as Luminous tries to stop the boy from going to the Dark King, but Baldez stops her. A beam of light comes out of him and joins the Dark King, resurrecting him. While Nagisa and Honoka fight them, Luminous tells Seekun to enter the Chairect, but Seekun is worried about her. However, Luminous reaffirms her decision to resurrect the Queen, and Seekun enters the Chairect, and in the Garden of Light, the power to create reacts, and the Elder senses that the Queen's resurrection is happening. Luminous finds herself in a mysterious place with Lulun and the Chairect, and the Queen informs her that her love for Earth is too strong and prevents the resurrection from happening. Nagisa and Honoka defeat Circulas, Viblis and Uraganos, but Baldez arrives to confront them.
96	47	"Open the Door! The Story Begins from Here"; Transliteration: "Tobira o Akete! Koko kara Hajimeru Monogatari" (Japanese: 扉を開けて! ここから始まる物語)	Daisuke Nishio	Daisuke Habara	Toshie Kawamura	Shinzo Yuki	January 29, 2006
Baldez attacks Nagisa and Honoka as the Queen tells Luminous that her feelings for the people are preventing her from becoming Queen. They fall into darkness, but regain the power of the Sparkle Bracelets and escape. He reveals to them that he is the Dark King and, although they defeat him with the Marble Screw Max Sparkle, he transforms into a stronger form until the Queen stops him and tells them that Hikari has chosen to become the Queen, but will live on in their hearts. They combine their powers and attack the Dark King with Extreme Luminario Max, killing him and permanently ending the Dark Zone's threat to the Gardens of Light and Rainbows. Afterwards, Nagisa and Honoka part ways with Mipple and Mepple, knowing that they will likely never see them or Hikari again. At Verone Academy's graduation, they are surprised when Akane introduces them to Hikari, who has been reborn as her own person, and the boy from the mansion, who has been reborn as her younger brother, Hikaru.

== See also ==
- Futari wa Pretty Cure Max Heart the Movie and Futari wa Pretty Cure Max Heart the Movie 2: Friends of the Snow-Laden Sky - Two animated films based on the series.
