= List of Yes! PreCure 5 episodes =

- Season 4
- No. of episodes: 49

Release
- Original network: ANN (ABC)
- Original release: February 4, 2007 – January 27, 2008

Series chronology
- ← Previous; Futari wa Pretty Cure Splash Star Next → Yes! PreCure 5 GoGo!

Yes! PreCure 5 is the fourth Pretty Cure anime television series produced by Toei Animation. The story follows a group of five girls who gain the power to transform into Pretty Cure and must collect the fifty-five Pinkies to complete the Dream Collet and save the Palmier Kingdom. The series began airing in Japan from February 4, 2007, to January 27, 2008, replacing Futari wa Pretty Cure Splash★Star in its timeslot, and was replaced by its sequel series, Yes! PreCure 5 GoGo!. The series uses three pieces of theme music, one opening and two ending themes. The opening theme is "Pretty Cure 5, Smile Go Go!" (プリキュア5、スマイル go go! Purikyua Faibu, Sumairu gō gō?) performed by Mayu Kudou, with the chorus performed by Young Fresh with Mayumi+Yuka. From episodes 1-32, the ending theme is "Kirakira-shichatte My True Love!" (キラキラしちゃってMy True Love! Kirakira-shicatte Mai Turū Rabu?, "Sparkle Brilliantly My True Love!") performed by Kanako Miyamoto. From episodes 33-49, the ending theme was changed to "Ganbalance de Dance ~Yumemiri Kiseki-tachi~" (ガンバランス de ダンス～夢みる奇跡たち～ Ganbaransu de Dansu ~Yumemiru Kiseki-tachi~"?), performed by Miyamoto with the Pretty Cure, which was also used as the theme for the film Great Miraculous Adventure in the Mirror Kingdom!. An insert song, "Tobikkiri! Yūki no Door" (とびっきり!勇気の扉（ドア） Tobikkiri! Yūki no Doa?, "Extraordinary! The Door of Courage") was performed by Mariya Ise as her character Urara Kasugano and used in episodes 20 and 29.

== Episode list ==
No.	Title	Original air date
1	"The Pretty Cure of Hope is Born!"; Transliteration: "Kibō no Purikyua tanjō!" (Japanese: 希望のプリキュア誕生!)	February 4, 2007
Nozomi Yumehara chases a mysterious butterfly and meets a mysterious man named Kouji Kokoda, who is actually the fairy Coco. She follows him into the library and finds the Dream Collet on the bookshelf. When an agent of Nightmare attacks to take the Dream Collet by force, she becomes Cure Dream to protect Coco and the Dream Collet, and after the battle decides to help him save the Palmier Kingdom.
2	"Passionate Full Force, Cure Rouge!"; Transliteration: "Jōnetsu zenkai Kyua Rūju!" (Japanese: 情熱全開キュアルージュ!)	February 11, 2007
Nozomi considers recruiting Rin Natsuki as a Pretty Cure, but Rin refuses to let her best friend risk her life fighting. However, after seeing what she has to go through, Rin decides to become a Pretty Cure and gains the power to become Cure Rouge.
3	"Who is the Pretty Cure of Efferverscence?"; Transliteration: "Hajikeru Purikyua wa dare?" (Japanese: はじけるプリキュアは誰?)	February 18, 2007
Nozomi and Rin meet with Urara Kasugano, who is curious about the Pretty Cure. Nozomi decides to skip class to spend extra time with Urara, who later gains the power to become Cure Lemonade.
4	"Tranquil Cure Mint!"; Transliteration: "Yasuragi no Kyua Minto!" (Japanese: やすらぎのキュアミント!)	February 25, 2007
Coco informs Nozomi, Rin and Urara that they have to find the last two Cures. Meanwhile, Komachi Akimoto and Karen Minazuki, who suspect that the three are causing strange events at the school, try to question them. Nozomi believes that they are worthy of becoming the last two Cures, and Komachi awakens her power and gains the power to transform into Cure Mint.
5	"The Qualifications of a Pretty Cure"; Transliteration: "Purikyua no Shikaku" (Japanese: プリキュアの資格)	March 4, 2007
The Cures believe that Karen could be the last Pretty Cure, but she is reluctant to become a Cure. When the blue butterfly appears before her, it disappears and she is unable to become a Cure.
6	"Pretty Cure 5 All Together!"; Transliteration: "Purikyua Faibu Zen'in Shūgō!" (Japanese: プリキュア5全員集合!)	March 11, 2007
Karen is depressed that she was not able to become a Pretty Cure. Nozomi, who still believes in her potential, tries to recruit her again. After she decides to fight for others, the blue butterfly reappears and she gains the power to become Cure Aqua.
7	"The close friend, Nuts, appears!" Transliteration: "Shin'yū Nattsu arawaru!" (Japanese: 親友ナッツ現る!)	March 18, 2007
The Cures release Nuts from the Dream Collet and search for a place to conduct their meetings in private.
8	"Compatibility Worst, Rin and Karen"; Transliteration: "Aishō saiaku Rin to Karen" (Japanese: 相性最悪りんとかれん)	March 25, 2007
Rin and Karen's conflicting personalities make it difficult for them to get along, despite others' efforts.
9	"The Pretty Cure Being Exposed!?"; Transliteration: "Purikyua ga Barechatta!?" (Japanese: プリキュアがばれちゃった!?)	April 1, 2007
Mika Masuko, the Cures' classmate, becomes suspicious of them because they are always together and begins investigating them.
10	"Save the Starving Nuts!"; Transliteration: "Harapeko Nattsu o Sukue!" (Japanese: 腹ぺこナッツを救え!)	April 8, 2007
Nuts overworks himself, causing him to faint, and the Cures blame Coco for not taking care of him.
11	"Nozomi and Coco's Hot-Air Balloon"; Transliteration: "Nozomi to Koko no netsu-kikyū" (Japanese: のぞみとココの熱気球)	April 15, 2007
When Nozomi is unable to concentrate on her studies even with the help of Karen and Komachi, the Cures try to motivate her, but their efforts upset her. Coco takes it upon himself to show Nozomi the potential he sees in her.
12	"Protect Urara's Stage!"; Transliteration: "Urara no Sutēji o Mamore!" (Japanese: うららのステージを守れ!)	April 22, 2007
Urara is scheduled to make her debut at a children's stage play, but Nightmare's attack threatens to ruin the show's success.
13	"Rin's Club Decided!"; Transliteration: "Rin-chan no Bukatsu Kettē!" (Japanese: りんちゃんの部活決定ーっ!)	April 29, 2007
Rin has been helping several sports teams and agreed to play with them all, but after learning they are all playing on the same day, must decide which club to join.
14	"The Worries of Student Council President Karen"; Transliteration: "Nayameru Seitokaichō Karen" (Japanese: 悩める生徒会長かれん)	May 6, 2007
Karen becomes troubled after the school clubs ask her to increase their budgets. The Cures decide to help her by solving the clubs' problems.
15	"Hustling Nozomi's Assistance!"; Transliteration: "Hassuru Nozomi no Otetsudai!" (Japanese: ハッスルのぞみのお手伝い!)	May 13, 2007
Nozomi's mother is ill, and Nozomi volunteers to do her housework while she rests.
16	"Komachi Quits Being A Novelist!?"; Transliteration: "Komachi Shōsetsuka Dannen!?" (Japanese: こまち小説家断念!?)	May 20, 2007
Komachi is almost finished with her first novel. While everyone else enjoys and praises the story, Nuts' attempt at constructive criticism upsets her and makes her consider giving up writing.
17	"The Love Story of a Naive Maiden"; Transliteration: "Junjō Otome no Koi Monogatari" (Japanese: 純情乙女の恋物語)	May 27, 2007
When Rin seems to be acting strangely, the Cures decide to investigate and discover that she is in love.
18	"Assault! Karen's Private Lifestyle"; Transliteration: "Totsugeki! Karen no Shiseikatsu" (Japanese: 突撃！かれんの私生活)	June 3, 2007
Mika conducts a personal interview with Karen, but the Cures spy on them and end up compromising her image.
19	"Investigate Urara's Secret!"; Transliteration: "Urara no Himitsu o Sagure!" (Japanese: うららの秘密を探れ!)	June 10, 2007
After hearing from her father and grandfather that Urara has been acting strange, the Cures set out to find out why.
20	"Pretty Cure 5's Singing Debut!?"; Transliteration: "Purikyua Faibu Kashu Debyū!?" (Japanese: プリキュア5歌手デビュー!?)	June 24, 2007
Urara is offered the chance to debut as a singer, but when Nightmare attacks, it threatens to ruin her debut. Urara's song, "Extraordinary! The Door of Courage", is featured in this episode.
21	"The Apprentice Caretaker, Milk, Appears!"; Transliteration: "Osewayaku Minarai Miruku Tōjō!" (Japanese: お世話役見習いミルク登場!)	July 1, 2007
Nozomi encounters a mysterious creature named Milk, who causes trouble after eating her lunch. After meeting Coco and Nuts, Milk reveals that she was their caretaker back in the Palmier Kingdom.
22	"Milk's Tumultuous Runaway!"; Transliteration: "Miruku no Iede de Ōsawagi!" (Japanese: ミルクの家出で大騒ぎ!)	July 8, 2007
Milk volunteers to help run the store, but causes trouble and flees, only to be discovered by Nightmare.
23	"Big Pinch! The Nightmarish Invitation"; Transliteration: "Dai Pinchi! Akumu no Shōtaijō" (Japanese: 大ピンチ！悪夢の招待状)	July 15, 2007
When one of Nozomi and Milk's arguments goes too far and shatters a bead butterfly the Cures had dedicated themselves to making, they get into an argument and split up. Taking advantage of the situation, Nightmare captures and possesses all of the Cures except for Nozomi.
24	"The New Power of the Five Girls!"; Transliteration: "Aratanaru Gonin no Chikara!" (Japanese: 新たなる5人の力!)	July 22, 2007
Cure Dream and Coco struggle against the possessed Cures until they receive a new power from Milk.
25	"Pretty Cure's Big Boarding Home Plan!"; Transliteration: "Purikyua Gasshuku Daisakusen!" (Japanese: プリキュア合宿大作戦!)	July 29, 2007
The Cures decide to go to a resort together and shop for supplies, and Rin struggles to keep order as they try to buy things she considers unnecessary.
26	"A Full Out Romantic Resort Life!"; Transliteration: "Romansu Zenkai Rizōto Raifu!" (Japanese: ロマンス全開リゾートライフ!)	August 5, 2007
At the resort, the Cures find activities to entertain themselves, and Nuts and Komachi and Nozomi and Coco grow closer.
27	"Rin has a Date With a Handsome Ghost!?"; Transliteration: "Rin-chan Ikemen Yūrei to Dēto!?" (Japanese: りんちゃんイケメン幽霊とデート!?)	August 12, 2007
Komachi tells everyone a scary story about Count Rosett, who died from illness while waiting for his lover to return, but was unaware that she had died in an accident. Each year, on the anniversary of her death, he haunts the mansion where he once lived. When the Cures enter the mansion, Nightmare scares Rin by making it appear to be haunted. However, there is also a real ghost, as she encounters the ghost of Count Rosett, who wanted to give his lover a hairpin and mistook Rin for her. Despite her fear of ghosts, she decides to help him in hopes of helping him pass on.
28	"Komachi's Summer Festival Chronicled"; Transliteration: "Komachi no Natsu Matsuri Funtōki" (Japanese: こまちの夏祭り奮闘記)	August 19, 2007
The Cures are thinking about what to serve during the festival. Komachi comes up with an original treat to serve, but after Nightmare unexpectedly eats all their ice, she must find an alternative with help from Karen.
29	"Nozomi's Manager-For-A-Day"; Transliteration: "Nozomi no Ichinichi Manējā" (Japanese: のぞみの一日マネージャー)	August 26, 2007
Summer is coming to an end and Nozomi still has not finished her summer project. Urara offers to let Nozomi come with her to her idol work to give her ideas, and Nozomi ends up being Urara's manager for the day after her manager is too busy.
30	"Milk's Decision and Everyone's Powers!"; Transliteration: "Miruku no Ketsui to Minna no Chikara!" (Japanese: ミルクの決意とみんなの力!)	September 2, 2007
During one of their fights, Milk tells Nozomi she is not worthy to be a Pretty Cure, causing her to break away from the other Cures. Without Nozomi, they struggle to fight against a Nightmare.
31	"Nozomi and Coco's Love Letter Mystery!"; Transliteration: "Nozomi to Koko no Raburetā Jiken!" (Japanese: のぞみとココのラブレター事件!)	September 9, 2007
Nozomi becomes jealous after learning that female students have been writing love letters to Coco, which he has been replying to. After a fight with Hadenya, a new agent of Nightmare, the next day Coco gives Nozomi a letter about his feelings.
32	"Rin's Happy Wedding"; Transliteration: "Rinchan no Happī Wedingu" (Japanese: りんちゃんのハッピーウェディング)	September 16, 2007
The best friend of Komachi's sister is getting married. After seeing a bracelet that Rin designed, the bride asks Rin to design and make a crown for her, but Rin wonders if she is worthy of making something so important.
33	"Big Scoop! Pretty Cure 5 Exclusive Coverage!"; Transliteration: "Dai Sukūpu! Purikyua Faibu Dokusen Shuzai!" (Japanese: 大スクープ！プリキュア5独占取材!)	September 23, 2007
Mika is struggling with her latest newspapers. After learning that some of the articles were not properly researched, Rin is upset about what Mika wrote about the soccer captain. Mika reveals that she has been the only person in the newspaper club since the others resigned after being unable to tolerate her pushy nature.
34	"Protect Milk! Karen, the Knight on the White Horse"; Transliteration: "Miruku o Mamore! Hakuba no Kishi Karen" (Japanese: ミルクを守れ！白馬の騎士かれん)	September 30, 2007
Milk becomes sick and Karen takes care of her while the others search for a special Pinky to cure her.
35	"Nuts' Key and Komachi's Heart"; Transliteration: "Nattsu no Kagi to Komachi no Kokoro" (Japanese: ナッツの鍵とこまちの心)	October 7, 2007
Komachi revises her novel and gives it to Nuts to look over, and is overjoyed when he gives his approval. However, a line about a key in the novel seems to bother Nuts, as it reminds him of the key he carries with him: the key to the Palmier Kingdom.
36	"Aim For the Finish Line! Marathon Championship"; Transliteration: "Mezase Kansō! Marason Taikai" (Japanese: 目指せ完走！マラソン大会)	October 14, 2007
Nozomi and Rin are both competing in a school relay race. Since Nozomi is exhausted from Rin's practice and training, the Cures join the relay to encourage her, but when Nightmare attacks, it threatens to disrupt the relay.
37	"Coco's Big Healthy Plan!"; Transliteration: "Koko no Herushī Daisakusen!" (Japanese: ココのヘルシー大作戦!)	October 21, 2007
Coco's craving for creampuffs causes him to become overweight, and Milk, Nuts, and the Cures decide he must go on a diet.
38	"Pretty Cure 5's Cinderella Story"; Transliteration: "Purikyua Faibu no Shinderera Monogatari" (Japanese: プリキュア5のシンデレラ物語)	October 28, 2007
Milk writes a story based on Cinderella about the Cures, but is annoyed by them trying to read it while she writes. As she finds a quieter place to complete her story, Nightmare captures her and turns her story into a reality.
39	"Terrifying! Despariah Revealed"; Transliteration: "Kyōfu! Desuparaia Arawaru" (Japanese: 恐怖！デスパライア現る)	November 11, 2007
Since there is no school, the Cures are doing their own thing. When Nozomi reveals that she has found a Pinky, Coco struggles with his feelings for her and the fact that he will have to leave her one day. However, this peace is disrupted when Despariah appears and confronts the Cures.
40	"Investigate the Chief Director's Identity!"; Transliteration: "Rijichō no Shōtai o Sagure!" (Japanese: 理事長の正体を探れ!)	November 18, 2007
Karen is suspicious of the fact that no one has seen the school's chief director and decides to investigate.
41	"Feelings Understood, Komachi and Urara"; Transliteration: "Tsutawaru Kimochi Komachi to Urara" (Japanese: 伝わる気持ち こまちとうらら)	November 25, 2007
Urara is auditioning for a play, but has to improvise for the final scene where her character says goodbye to the boy she loves. Urara finally settles on "I cannot say goodbye," and everyone applauds the line. Komachi, on the other hand, is struggling to write a similar scene in her latest novel, and feels that the line is not quite right.
42	"Rin and Karen's Covered Promises"; Transliteration: "Rin to Karen no Hisokana Yakusoku" (Japanese: りんとかれんのひそかな約束)	December 2, 2007
The Cures are decorating the Nuts House for Christmas when Nozomi realizes that they have forgotten the flowers. She decides that Karen, who loves flowers, and Rin, whose family owns a flower shop, are perfect for the job.
43	"Komachi's Decision and Nuts' Future"; Transliteration: "Komachi no Ketsui to Nattsu no Mirai" (Japanese: こまちの決意とナッツの未来)	December 9, 2007
Komachi had decided with Urara that it would be best to end her latest novel with a quiet understanding between the romantic leads, but she begins to wonder if this is really the best ending. Unable to decide whether the girl should confess her feelings or not, she discusses her problem with the others. The others think that Komachi should ask Nuts' opinion, but she is reluctant to do so because the romantic leads are based on her and Nuts.
44	"What exactly is a Caretaker?"; Transliteration: "Osewayakutte Donna Hito?" (Japanese: お世話役ってどんな人?)	December 16, 2007
Feeling that she is inadequate as a caretaker for Coco and Nuts, Milk begins to question what an ideal caretaker is.
45	"Nozomi and Coco's Christmas Vow"; Transliteration: "Nozomi to Koko no Kurisimasu no Chikai" (Japanese: のぞみとココのクリスマスの誓い)	December 23, 2007
Christmas is approaching and there is only one Pinky left to find. Nozomi suddenly realizes that Coco, Nuts and Milk will be returning home soon, but tries to act normal. However, Coco notices that something is wrong and confronts her.
46	"Kawarino's Heartless Strategy!"; Transliteration: "Kawarīno Hijō no Sakuryaku!" (Japanese: カワリーノ非情の策略!)	January 6, 2008
On New Year's Day, the Cures visit a temple for the New Year's prayer. On their way home, Nozomi finds the last Pinky sitting on her shoulder, but then Bloody attacks. As they prepare to activate the Dream Collet, Kawarino captures Coco and disguises himself as him to trick the Cures into handing it over.
47	"Take Back the Dream Collet!"; Transliteration: "Dorīmu Koretto o Torimodose!" (Japanese: ドリームコレットを取り戻せ!)	January 13, 2008
The Cures, along with Coco and Nuts, are depressed about losing the Dream Collet, and Milk blames herself for falling for Kawarino's deception. However, Nozomi tells them that they must not give up as long as there is hope, and that they can achieve their goal even without the Dream Collet's power.
48	"Hope VS Despair, The Last Battle!"; Transliteration: "Kibō Tai Zetsubō Saigo no Taiketsu!" (Japanese: 希望VS絶望 最後の対決!)	January 20, 2008
Despariah has used the Dream Collet to attain eternal youth and life, causing the Dream Collet to lose its power. However, the Cures refuse to give up.
49	"Pretty Cure 5 of Dreams and Hope!"; Transliteration: "Yume to Kibō no Purikyua Faibu!" (Japanese: 夢と希望のプリキュア5!)	January 27, 2008
All that remains of Nightmare is Despariah, who is surprised that the Cures are still fighting her despite facing despair. Nozomi realizes that Despariah has a heart like them, and after learning that she is still filled with despair even after achieving her dream, decides to seal her away instead of killing her. With Nightmare defeated, the Cures continue to pursue their dreams as Coco, Nuts, and Milk return home to the Palmier Kingdom.

== See also ==
- Yes! PreCure 5 the Movie: Great Miraculous Adventure in the Mirror Kingdom! - An animated film based on the series.
