= List of PreCure Splash Star episodes =

- Season 3
- No. of episodes: 49

Release
- Original network: ANN (ABC)
- Original release: February 5, 2006 – January 28, 2007

Series chronology
- ← Previous; Pretty Cure Max Heart Next → Yes! PreCure 5

PreCure Splash Star, also known as Futari wa Pretty Cure Splash☆Star, is the third Pretty Cure anime television series produced by Toei Animation. The story revolves around two girls, Saki Hyuuga and Mai Mishou, who are chosen to become Pretty Cure. They fight against Dark Fall and work to restore the World Tree by restoring the Fountains connected to it, which were damaged after Dark Fall's attack. The series aired in Japan from February 5, 2006, to January 28, 2007, replacing Pretty Cure Max Heart in its initial timeslot and was succeeded by Yes! PreCure 5. The opening theme for all of the episodes is "Makasete★Splash☆Star★" (Japanese: まかせて★スプラッシュ☆スター★; "Leave it to Us★Splash☆Star★") by Yuka Uchiyae with Splash Stars. The ending theme used in episodes 1-30 is "'Warau ga Kachi' de GO!" (Japanese: 「笑うが勝ち!」でGO!; "'Laugh and Win!' GO!") by Mayumi Gojo, and the ending theme for episode 31 and onwards is "Ganbalance de Dance" (Japanese: ガンバランスdeダンス) also by Mayumi Gojo with Flappy and Choppy.

== Episode list ==
No.	Title	Directed by	Written by	Animation directed by	Art directed by	Original release date
1	"A Surprising Reunion! Who Are We, Exactly!?"; Transliteration: "Oddoroki no Saikai! Futari wa Nani Mono Nano!?" (Japanese: おっどろきの再会! ふたりは何者なの!?)	Toshiaki Komura	Haruko Nagatsu	Mitsuru Aoyama & Akira Inagami	Shinzo Yuki	February 5, 2006
Saki and Mai reunite at the Sky Tree, where they first met as children after following a mysterious light, and meet the fairies Flappy and Choppy, who reveal that they were the light they saw. When Karehaan attacks, they gain the power to transform into Pretty Cure.
2	"The Welcome Party at Panpaka is a Premonition of Storm!"; Transliteration: "Panpaka no Kangeikai wa Arashi no Yokan!" (Japanese: パンパカ歓迎会は 嵐の予感!)	Takashi Otsuka	Yoshimi Narita	Hiroyuki Kawano	Shinzo Yuki	February 12, 2006
With Mai having transferred to her class at Yuunagi Middle School, Saki invites her to the welcome party at her bakery shop to get to know her better.
3	"A Head-on Match! You're the Ace!!"; Transliteration: "Makkō Shōbu! Kimi koso Ēsu da!!" (Japanese: 真っ向勝負! 君こそエースだ!!!)	Takao Iwai	Higashi Shimizu	Miho Azuma	Shinzo Yuki	February 19, 2006
Yuunagi Middle School's Nagichuu Softball Club faces their first match, and Saki attempts to help them after they doubt they can win.
4	"Are you kidding!? The scenery of spring and the voices of cicadas" Transliteration: "Ussō!? Haru no Keshiki to Semi no Koe" (Japanese: うっそー!? 春の景色とセミの声)	Akinori Yabe	Daisuke Habara	Toshiharu Takahashi	Shinzo Yuki	February 26, 2006
Mai is scouted to enter the art contest and decides to make her drawing about the scenery of spring.
5	"What will Kenta do!? Saki and the Cute Older Brother!"; Transliteration: "Kenta dō suru!? Saki to Suteki na Oniisan!" (Japanese: 健太どうする!? 咲と素敵なお兄さん)	Yasuo Yamayoshi	Yoshimi Narita	Katsumi Tamegai	Shinzo Yuki	March 5, 2006
Saki meets Mai's older brother, Kazuya, and develops a crush on him.
6	"He's the Best After All! Cool Father!!"; Transliteration: "Yappa Saikō! Iketeru Otousan!!" (Japanese: やっぱ最高! イケてるお父さん!!)	Takenori Kawada	Daisuke Habara	Yasuhiro Namatame	Shinzo Yuki	March 12, 2006
As Saki and Mai's families decide to go on a camping trip together, Saki's parents consider moving to another town for their job.
7	"Ultra-serious! Karehaan of the Wrath!"; Transliteration: "Chō Maji! Ikari no Karehān!" (Japanese: 超マジ! 怒りのカレハーン!)	Toshiaki Komura	Haruko Nagatsu	Shûichi Iijima	Shinzo Yuki	March 19, 2006
Karehaan is given a final chance to defeat the Pretty Cures, but they defeat him and restore the Fountain of Wood.
8	"I Love You! Minori and the Two Big Sisters"; Transliteration: "Daisuki! Minori to futari no Oneechan" (Japanese: 大好き! みのりと二人のお姉ちゃん)	Takashi Otsuka	Higashi Shimizu	Mitsuru Aoyama	Tatsuro Iseri	March 26, 2006
After Minori accidentally spills juice on Mai's drawing, she, Saki and Mai are upset about the situation. Later, a new agent of Dark Fall, Moerumba, attacks, and Saki and Mai struggle to fight him because of their arguing preventing them from fighting in sync.
9	"Don't Interfere With Our Recital!"; Transliteration: "Rōdokukai o Jama Shichadame!" (Japanese: 朗読会を邪魔しちゃダメ!)	Yoshihiro Oka	Yoshimi Narita	Toshie Kawamura	Shinzo Yuki	April 2, 2006
Saki and Mai help Andou with a recital for children at the library.
10	"Super-dangerous? On the Sea is the Uproar!"; Transliteration: "Choi Yaba? Umi no Ue wa Ōsawagi!" (Japanese: ちょいヤバ? 海の上は大騒ぎ!)	Takao Iwai	Higashi Shimizu	Miho Azuma	Shōichirō Sugiura	April 9, 2006
Saki and her friends decide to do a report on Kenta's family, who work at a fishing boat shop called Hoshinoya.
11	"The Big Pinch of dizzy Flappi!"; Transliteration: "Furafura Furappi Dai Pinchi!" (Japanese: ふらふらフラッピ 大ピンチ!)	Hiroyuki Kawano	Daisuke Habara	Akifumi Zako	Shinzo Yuki	April 16, 2006
Saki and Flappy argue after he catches a cold.
12	"Choppi is Homesick, Chopi?"; Transliteration: "Choppi wa Chopi tto Hōmushikku?" (Japanese: チョッピは チョピっとホームシック?)	Akinori Yabe	Higashi Shimizu	Kaori Takamura	Shōichirō Sugiura	April 23, 2006
The Cures attempt to cheer up Choppy after she becomes homesick and misses her homeland.
13	"It's Too Hot! Moerumba Dance!"; Transliteration: "Atsusugi! Moerunba Dansu!" (Japanese: 熱すぎ! モエルンバダンス!)	Yasuo Yamayoshi	Daisuke Habara	Toshiharu Takahashi	Shinzo Yuki	April 30, 2006
Moerumba is given a final chance to defeat the Pretty Cures, but they defeat him and restore the Fountain of Fire.
14	"The Riddle Exchange Students! Michiru and Kaoru came" Transliteration: "Nazo no Tenkōsei! Michiru to Kaoru ga yattekita" (Japanese: 謎*の転校生! 満と薫がやってきた)	Takenori Kawada	Yoshimi Narita	Katsumi Tamegai	Yumi Hosaka	May 7, 2006
Michiru and Kaoru, agents of Dark Fall, transfer to Yuunagi Middle School to spy on them, but begin to befriend them. Later, a new agent of Dark Fall, Dorodoron, attacks.
15	"Softball is the Bond Between Parents and Child"; Transliteration: "Sofutobōru wa Oyako no Kizuna" (Japanese: ソフトボールは親子の絆)	Takashi Otsuka	Kenichi Yamashita	Yasuhiro Namatame	Shinzo Yuki	May 14, 2006
Dorodoron puts an Uzainaa in Saki's glove, causing her to perform poorly at softball.
16	"Dream, Hope and Kenta's Worries!"; Transliteration: "Yume to Kibō to Kenta no Nayami!" (Japanese: 夢と希望と健太の悩み!)	Takao Iwai	Daisuke Habara	Shûichi Iijima	Shinzo Yuki	May 21, 2006
Kenta begins to worry about his future and decides to pursue his dream of becoming a comedian instead of working for his family's business.
17	"The Broken Haniwa! What will Mai and Mother do?" Transliteration: "Kowareta Haniwa! Dō suru Mai to Okaasan" (Japanese: 壊れた埴輪! どうする舞とお母さん)	Yoshihiro Oka	Kenichi Yamashita	Mitsuru Aoyama	Shōichirō Sugiura	May 28, 2006
Choppy tries to reconcile with Mai after accidentally breaking a haniwa belonging to her mother.
18	"Today is Special Sale! Michiru and Kaoru Come to Help!?"; Transliteration: "Honjitsu Tokubai! Michiru to Kaoru ga Otetsudai!?" (Japanese: 本日特売! 満と薫がお手伝い!?)	Akinori Yabe	Yoshimi Narita	Toshie Kawamura	Shinzo Yuki	June 4, 2006
Since her family's shop, Panpaka-pan, is having a special sale, Saki invites Michiru and Kaoru to help her family.
19	"What is the Important thing? Saki and Mai's Wish"; Transliteration: "Taisetsu na Mono wa Nani? Saki to Mai no Negaigoto" (Japanese: 大切なものは何? 咲と舞の願い事)	Yasuo Yamayoshi	Higashi Shimizu	Hiroyuki Kawano	Tatsurō Iseri	June 11, 2006
After Saki and Mai break a promise to each other, they begin to drift apart. After two mysterious fairies transform their pencil cases, they are able to write to each other and try to reconcile.
20	"If Someone Singing in the Rain, It's Dorodoron!"; Transliteration: "Ame ni Utaeba Dorodoron!" (Japanese: 雨に唄えばドロドロン!)	Takenori Kawada	Higashi Shimizu	Kaoru Takamura	Shinzo Yuki	June 25, 2006
Dorodoron is given a final chance to defeat the Pretty Cures, but they defeat him and restore the Fountain of Earth. Unlike before, where they only saw glimpses of Princess Filia, they are now able to hear her voice.
21	"Shine in the Night Sky! Friends of Starlight"; Transliteration: "Yozora ni Kagayake! Hoshi no Hikari no Nakamatachi" (Japanese: 夜空に輝け! 星の光の仲間たち)	Akifumi Zako	Kenichi Yamashita	Toshiharu Takahashi	Shinzo Yuki	July 2, 2006
As Saki and Mai go with Kazuya for stargazing, Michiru and Kaoru attack with an Uzaina. Later, Mai begins to piece together their true identity.
22	"Super-surprise! Michiru and Kaoru's Shock Confession!!"; Transliteration: "Chō Odoroki! Michiru to Kaoru no Shōgeki Kokuhaku!!" (Japanese: 超オドロキ! 満と薫の衝撃告白!!)	Takao Iwai	Daisuke Habara	Mitsuru Aoyama	Shinzo Yuki	July 9, 2006
Michiru and Kaoru directly attack the Cures and reveal their true identities to them.
23	"Finally Showdown! Menace Akudaikaan"; Transliteration: "Tsui ni Taiketsu! Kyōi no Akudaikān" (Japanese: ついに対決! 脅威のアクダイカーン)	Tatsuya Nagamine	Yoshimi Narita	Katsumi Tamegai	Shinzo Yuki	July 16, 2006
The Cures confront Akudaikaan and Goyan, and Michiru and Kaoru sacrifice themselves to save them, seemingly dying in the process.
24	"Mupu and Fupu Make the Entry! Who?"; Transliteration: "Mūpu to Fūpu Tōjō! tte Dare?" (Japanese: ムープとフープ登場! って誰?)	Yoshihiro Oka & Toshiaki Komura	Yoshimi Narita	Mika Okuyama & Akira Inagami	Shinzo Yuki	July 23, 2006
The Cures restore the Fountain of Sky and learn from Filia that Michiru and Kaoru may be alive. Back on Earth, they learn that all memories and evidence of Michiru and Kaoru's existence have been erased and spot two mysterious fairies. When Ms. Shitataare, a new general of Dark Fall, attacks, the fairies, Moop and Fuup, give them the Spiral Rings, giving them the power to fight her.
25	"Business flourishing! Help at the house of sea" Transliteration: "Shōbai Hanjō! Umi no Ie no Otetsudai" (Japanese: 商売繁盛! 海の家のお手伝い)	Takashi Otsuka	Kenichi Yamashita	Shûichi Iijima	Shinzo Yuki	July 30, 2006
Saki and Mai help Kenta and his family with work at their shop.
26	"Keep it a secret from Saki! Exciting summer camping!" Transliteration: "Saki ni wa Naisho! Dokkidoki no Natsu Gasshuku!" (Japanese: 咲には内緒! ドッキドキの夏合宿!)	Akinori Yabe	Higashi Shimizu	Toshie Kawamura	Shinzo Yuki	August 6, 2006
Saki becomes suspicious of how her classmates and teachers are acting, but later learns that they were planning a surprise party for her birthday.
27	"I love everyone! The summer festival of memory" Transliteration: "Minna Daisuki! Omoide no Natsu Matsuri" (Japanese: みんな大好き! 思い出の夏祭り)	Takenori Kawada	Isao Murayama	Kaoru Takamura	Shinzo Yuki	August 13, 2006
Saki and Mai celebrate the summer festival and reminisce about when they first met.
28	"A Trip! Electric Train! Big Adventure!"; Transliteration: "Tabi da! Densha da! Daibōken!" (Japanese: 旅だ! 電車だ! 大冒険!)	Yasuo Yamayoshi	Daisuke Habara	Hiroyuki Kawano	Tatsurō Iseri	August 20, 2006
With summer vacation coming to an end, Saki and Mai decide to take a trip on a train.
29	"Flappi and Choppi are in a Danger"; Transliteration: "Furappi Choppi Zettai Zetsumei!" (Japanese: フラッピチョッピ 絶体絶命!)	Takao Iwai	Daisuke Habara	Miho Azuma	Shinzo Yuki	August 27, 2006
Goyan captures Flappy and Choppy in hopes of learning the location of the Fountain of Sun.
30	"The Power of Miracle! Pretty Cure's Big Transformation!"; Transliteration: "Kyōi no Chikara! Purikyua Dai Henshin!" (Japanese: 驚異の力! プリキュア大変身!!)	Toshiaki Komura	Yoshimi Narita	Toshiharu Takahashi & Akira Inagami	Shinzo Yuki	September 3, 2006
Saki and Mai head to Dark Fall's lair to rescue Flappy and Choppy and confront Goyan. The combined power of the four fairies grants them new powers and allows Flappy and Choppy to transform into the Crystal Communes, which allow them to transform into Cure Bright and Cure Windy.
31	"Is it Really Decided? Kenta's Buddy is Who!?"; Transliteration: "Maji Kimari? Kenta no Aikata wa Dare!?" (Japanese: マジ決まり? 健太の相方は誰!?)	Tatsuya Nagamine	Higashi Shimizu	Mitsuru Aoyama & Katsumi Tamegai	Shinzo Yuki	September 10, 2006
Kenta attempts to find a partner for his comedy act at the upcoming culture festival.
32	"Too Difficult! Mizu Shitataare's Homework"; Transliteration: "Muzukashisugi! Mizu Shitatāre no Shukudai" (Japanese: 難しすぎ! ミズ・シタターレの宿題)	Akifumi Zako	Kenichi Yamashita	Mika Okuyama	Shinzo Yuki	September 17, 2006
Having been given a final chance to defeat the Cures, Ms. Shitataare disguises herself as their teacher Shinohara, but they defeat her.
33	"Muscle Full Throttle Kintresky Appears!"; Transliteration: "Kinniku Zenkai Kintoresukī Arawaru!" (Japanese: 筋肉全開 キントレスキー現る!)	Akinori Yabe	Kenichi Yamashita	Shûichi Iijima	Shinzo Yuki	September 24, 2006
The Cures restore the Fountain of Water. Later, Kintoleski, a new agent of Dark Fall, attacks. The past of how Saki met and raised Korone is also revealed.
34	"Moon-viewing Meeting is the Smell of Romance"; Transliteration: "Otsukimikai wa Romansu no Kaori" (Japanese: お月見会はロマンスの香り)	Takenori Kawada	Yoshimi Narita	Toshie Kawamura	Tatsurō Iseri	October 1, 2006
Mai invites her classmates to join a moon viewing event at her house.
35	"Now's the Final Round! Fight, Nagichuu Softball Club!"; Transliteration: "Iza kesshō! Faito da Nagichū Sofuto-bu!" (Japanese: いざ決勝! ファイトだ凪中ソフト部!)	Takashi Otsuka	Isao Murayama	Kaoru Takamura	Shinzo Yuki	October 8, 2006
The Nagichuu Softball Club faces the final round of the softball match.
36	"What will Mai do? Mai's Worries and Culture Festival"; Transliteration: "Nani Tsukuru? Mai no Nayami to Bunkasai" (Japanese: 何作る? 舞の悩みと文化祭)	Yasuo Yamayoshi & Akinori Yabe	Daisuke Habara	Hiroyuki Kawano	Shinzo Yuki	October 15, 2006
Mai is assigned to design a monument for the culture festival.
37	"Everyone is comrades! Jump to tomorrow!" Transliteration: "Minna Nakama da! Ashita ni Janpu!" (Japanese: みんな仲間だ! 明日にジャンプ!)	Yoshihiro Oka	Higashi Shimizu	Miho Azuma	Shinzo Yuki	October 22, 2006
At the culture festival, Saki and Mai's class run a haunted house.
38	"Idol has Born, Hyuuga Saki! Really!?"; Transliteration: "Aidoru Tōjō Hyūga Saki! tte Maji!?" (Japanese: アイドル誕生日向咲! ってマジ!?)	Takao Iwai	Kenichi Yamashita	Toshiharu Takahashi	Shinzo Yuki	October 29, 2006
Saki is scouted by President Kizaki to become an idol.
39	"The Great Rebellion of the Rare Animals, Miminga!?"; Transliteration: "Chinjū Miminga Ōsōdō!?" (Japanese: 珍獣ミミンガ大騒動!?)	Akinori Yabe	Higashi Shimizu	Mika Okuyama	Tatsurō Iseri	November 12, 2006
Flappy and Choppy are hunted down after being mistaken for a rare Miminga.

No.	Title	Original air date
40	"You're Noisy! Kintresky and Birthday"; Transliteration: "Urusa~i! Kintoresukī to Tanjōbi" (Japanese: うるさ～い! キントレスキーと誕生日)	November 19, 2006
Kintoleski is given a final chance to defeat the Pretty Cures, but they defeat him.
41	"Princess is in danger! The stolen carafe!!" Transliteration: "Ōjo ga Abunai! Ubawareta Kyarafe!!" (Japanese: 王女が危ない! 奪われたキャラフェ!!)	November 26, 2006
The Cures restore the Fountain of Gold, but Goyan appears and steals the Fairy Carafe, using its power to revive Moerumba and Karehaan.
42	"Welcome back! Michiru and Kaoru!!"; Transliteration: "Okaerinasai! Michiru to Kaoru!!" (Japanese: お帰りなさい!満と薫!!)	December 3, 2006
Goyan uses the Fairy Carafe's power to revive the other agents of Dark Fall. Filia temporarily possesses Korone's body until they can recover the Carafe and her power. Michiru and Kaoru are later revived through the combined power of Filia, Moop, and Fuup, and return to aid the Cures and help them defeat Karehan.
43	"It's Not a Dream! One Day That Has Everyone"; Transliteration: "Yume janai! Minna no iru Ichinichi" (Japanese: 夢じゃない! みんなのいる一日)	December 10, 2006
Dark Fall begins to hunt down Michiru and Kaoru for being traitors, and they later help the Cures defeat Moerumba.
44	"These Two will Disappear? Painful Michiru and Kaoru"; Transliteration: "Futari ga Kieru? Kurushimi no Michiru to Kaoru" (Japanese: 二人が消える? 苦しみの満と薫)	December 17, 2006
Michiru and Kaoru learn that they were revived through the power of spirits and destruction, and that if one of them disappears, they may disappear as well. They later help the Cures defeat Dorodoron.
45	"Cake, Kazuya and Christmas!"; Transliteration: "Kēki to Kazuya to Kurisumasu!" (Japanese: ケーキと和也とクリスマス!)	December 24, 2006
The Cures celebrate a Christmas festival with Saki's family as well as Michiru and Kaoru, who later help them defeat Shitataare and Kintoleski.
46	"Counterattack! Akudaikaan's Menace Power!"; Transliteration: "Hangeki! Akudaikān Kyōi no Chikara!" (Japanese: 反撃! アクダイカーン脅威の力!)	January 7, 2007
Saki, Mai, Michiru, and Kaoru go to face Akudaikaan at Dark Fall.
47	"Big Reversal! The Black Curtain is Who?"; Transliteration: "Daigyakuten!? Kuromaku tte Dare no Koto?" (Japanese: 大逆転!? 黒幕って誰のこと?)	January 14, 2007
Goyan reveals that he created Akudaikaan to act for him and that he had secretly planned to become ruler himself. He transforms into a more monstrous form and prepares to attack Earth.
48	"The Last Decisive Battle! The Stolen Land of Greenery!"; Transliteration: "Saishū kessen! Ubawareta Midori no Sato!" (Japanese: 最終決戦! 奪われた緑の郷!)	January 21, 2007
As Goyan attacks and seemingly destroys Earth, the Cures, along with Michiru and Kaoru, who gain the power of Bright and Windy, face the final battle with Goyan.
49	"Reach to the Top! We're Forever Friends of the Starry Sky!"; Transliteration: "Zekkōchō Nari! Eien no Hoshizora no Nakamatachi!" (Japanese: 絶好調なり! 永遠の星空の仲間たち!)	January 28, 2007
After the Cures defeat Goyan, life returns to normal as Earth and the Land of Fountains are restored to normal.

== See also ==
- PreCure Splash Star: Tick-Tock Crisis Hanging by a Thin Thread! - An animated film based on the series.
